= 2024 IF Brommapojkarna season =

IF Brommapojkarna
2024 season
- Manager: Olof Mellberg
- Stadium: Bravida Arena
- Allsvenskan: 11th
- 2023–24 Svenska Cupen: Quarter-finals
- 2024–25 Svenska Cupen: Pre-season
- Top goalscorer: League: Nikola Vasić (7); All: Nikola Vasić (7)
Home colours

The 2024 IF Brommapojkarna season is the club's 82nd year in existence and their second consecutive season in the top flight. IF Brommapojkarna played their first match on 17 February.

== Players ==
=== First-team squad ===
As of 18 June 2024

Note: Flags indicate national team as defined under FIFA eligibility rules; some limited exceptions apply. Players may hold more than one non-FIFA nationality.

No.	Pos.	Nation	Player
1	GK	SWE	Lucas Hägg-Johansson
2	DF	NOR	Torbjørn Heggem
3	DF	SWE	Alexander Abrahamsson
4	DF	SWE	Eric Björkander
5	DF	NOR	Liiban Abadid
6	MF	SWE	Gustav Sandberg Magnusson (captain)
7	DF	DEN	Frederik Christensen
8	FW	RSA	Liam Jordan
9	FW	SWE	Nikola Vasić
10	MF	SWE	Wilmer Odefalk
11	MF	SWE	Rasmus Örqvist
13	MF	SWE	Ludvig Fritzson
14	FW	SWE	Alexander Johansson

No.	Pos.	Nation	Player
15	MF	SWE	Paya Pichkah
17	DF	DEN	Alexander Jensen
18	MF	SWE	Alfons Lohake
19	DF	MKD	Leonard Zuta
20	GK	SWE	Filip Sidklev
21	FW	SWE	Alex Timossi Andersson
22	DF	SWE	Liam Tahwildaran
23	FW	SWE	Tim Waker
24	MF	SWE	Kevin Ackermann
26	DF	ARM	André Calisir
28	MF	SWE	Mario Butros
31	GK	SWE	Otega Ekperuoh

== Transfers ==
=== In ===
Pos.	Player	Transferred from	Fee	Date	Source
MF	(Sweden) Rasmus Örqvist	(Sweden) Degerfors IF	€175,000	1 February 2024	
DF	(Denmark) Frederik Christensen	(Denmark) FC Fredericia	Undisclosed	1 February 2024	
MF	(Sweden) Paya Pichkah	(Sweden) GIF Sundsvall	Undisclosed	15 February 2024	
MF	(Syria) Daleho Irandust	(Netherlands) FC Groningen	Undisclosed	27 February 2024	
GK	(Finland) Lucas Bergström	(England) Chelsea	Loan	29 February 2024	
DF	(Denmark) Kaare Barslund	(Denmark) FC Nordsjælland	Free	11 March 2024	
FW	(Denmark) Adam Jakobsen	(Denmark) FC Fredericia	Free	16 March 2024	

=== Out ===
Pos.	Player	Transferred to	Fee	Date	Source
DF	(Iraq) Rebin Sulaka	Released		1 January 2024	
FW	(Sweden) Marijan Ćosić	Released		1 January 2024	
FW	(Sweden) Monir Jelassi	(Sweden) GIF Sundsvall	Free	1 February 2024	
DF	(Sweden) Sebastian Wändin	(Sweden) Stockholm Internazionale	Loan	2 February 2024	
DF	(Norway) Liiban Abdirahman Abadid	(Finland) AC Oulu	Loan	17 March 2024	

== Pre-season and friendlies ==
20 January 2024 Friendly	IF Brommapojkarna (Sweden)	3–0	(Sweden) Djurgården	Vällingby
	Fritzson 2'; Vasić 49'; Jensen 63'			Stadium: Grimsta IP

27 January 2024 Friendly	IF Brommapojkarna (Sweden)	0–3	(Sweden) AIK	Vällingby
14:00	Renman (yellow card) 86'		Kusi-Asare 6', 25'; Ali 60'	Stadium: Grimsta IP

3 February 2024 Friendly	IF Brommapojkarna (Sweden)	7–1	(Sweden) Täby

9 February 2024 Friendly	Örebro SK (Sweden)	1–0	(Sweden) IF Brommapojkarna	Örebro
15:00	Kroon 12'			Stadium: Behrn Arena

15 February 2024 Friendly	IF Brommapojkarna (Sweden)	Cancelled	(Sweden) IFK Norrköping
15:00

15 March 2024 Friendly	Mjällby (Sweden)	1–2	(Sweden) IF Brommapojkarna	Jönköping
14:00	Johansson 56'		Andersson 46', 65'	Stadium: Jordbrovallen

16 March 2024 Friendly	IF Brommapojkarna (Sweden)	Cancelled	(Sweden) Sandvikens IF

23 March 2024 Friendly	IF Brommapojkarna (Sweden)	1–0	(Sweden) GIF Sundsvall	Vällingby
14:00	Vasić 15'			Stadium: Grimsta IP

23 June 2024 Friendly	IF Brommapojkarna (Sweden)	3–1	(Sweden) Hammarby IF	Vällingby
13:00	Irandust 36'; Vasić 39', 59'		Teah 70'	Stadium: Grimsta IP

== Competitions ==
=== Overall record ===
Competition	First match	Last match	Starting round	Final position	Record							
Competition	First match	Last match	Starting round	Final position	Pld	W	D	L	GF	GA	GD	Win %
Allsvenskan	31 March 2024	November 2024	Matchday 1		12	3	6	3	19	21	−2	25.00
2023–24 Svenska Cupen	17 February 2024	9 March 2024	Group stage	Quarter-finals	4	2	1	1	5	2	+3	50.00
2024–25 Svenska Cupen	TBD		TBD		0	0	0	0	0	0	+0	—
Total					16	5	7	4	24	23	+1	31.25

Last updated: 1 June 2024
Source: Soccerway

=== Allsvenskan ===
==== League table ====
Pos	Team	Pld	W	D	L	GF	GA	GD	Pts	Qualification or relegation
8	BK Häcken	30	12	6	12	54	51	+3	42	Qualification for the Europa League first qualifying round (Note: BK Häcken qualified for the Europa League first qualifying round as the 2024–25 Svenska Cupen winners.)
9	IK Sirius	30	12	5	13	47	46	+1	41	
10	IF Brommapojkarna	30	8	10	12	46	53	−7	34	
11	IFK Norrköping	30	9	7	14	36	57	−21	34	
12	Halmstads BK	30	10	3	17	32	50	−18	33	

Source: svenskfotboll.se (in Swedish)
Rules for classification: 1) Points; 2) Goal difference; 3) Goals scored; 4) Head-to-head points; 5) Head-to-head goal difference; 6) Head-to-head away goals scored; 7) Play-off
(Note: Play-off is only played if need to decide champion, teams for relegation or UEFA competition and will be played on a neutral ground).

==== Results summary ====
Overall								Home						Away					
Pld	W	D	L	GF	GA	GD	Pts	W	D	L	GF	GA	GD	W	D	L	GF	GA	GD
12	3	6	3	19	21	−2	15	1	3	2	7	14	−7	2	3	1	12	7	+5

Last updated: 1 June 2024.

==== Results by round ====
Round	1	2	3	4	5	6	7	8	9	10	11	12	13
Ground	A	H	A	A	H	H	A	A	H	H	A	H	A
Result	W	D	L	W	D	L	D	D	L	W	D	D	
Position	2	4	8	3	6	10	10	9	13	10	10	11	

Updated to match(es) played on 1 June 2024. Source: Worldfootball
A = Away; H = Home; W = Win; D = Draw; L = Loss

==== Matches ====
31 March 2024 1	GAIS	0–4	IF Brommapojkarna	Gothenburg
14:00 CEST (UTC+2)			Jakobsen 11'; Fritzson 45+1'; Odefalk 69'; Norén 83' (o.g.)	Stadium: Gamla Ullevi; Attendance: 8,077; Referee: Joakim Östling

6 April 2024 2	IF Brommapojkarna	2–2	AIK	Vällingby
15:00 CEST (UTC+2)	Fritzson 31'; Vasić (penalty missed) 90+2', 90+2'		Modesto 53'; Ali 70'	Stadium: Grimsta IP; Attendance: 3,489; Referee: Kristoffer Karlsson

15 April 2024 3	Häcken	4–3	IF Brommapojkarna	Gothenburg
19:00 CEST (UTC+2)	Gustafson 3'; Layouni 35'; Inoussa 57'; Chilufya (yellow card) 65'; Lindberg 69', (yellow card) 72'		Irandust 16'; Fritzson 25'; Barslund 60'	Stadium: Bravida Arena; Attendance: 3,265; Referee: Granit Maqedonci

21 April 2024 4	Halmstads BK	0–2	IF Brommapojkarna	Halmstad
16:30 CEST (UTC+2)			Christensen 2'; Örqvist 62'	Stadium: Örjans Vall; Attendance: 5,073; Referee: Adi Aganovic

24 April 2024 5	IF Brommapojkarna	1–1	Sirius	Vällingby
19:00 CEST (UTC+2)	Vasić 51'; Björkander (yellow card) 54' (yellow-red card)		Milleskog 59'	Stadium: Grimsta IP; Referee: Richard Sundell

29 April 2024 6	IF Brommapojkarna	0–3	IFK Göteborg	Vällingby
19:00 CEST (UTC+2)	Vasić (yellow card) 32'; Calisir (yellow card) 54'		Santos 5'; Thordarson (yellow card) 56'; Skjellerup 64', (yellow card) 68'; Yalcouyé 83'	Stadium: Grimsta IP; Referee: Oscar Johnson

4 May 2024 7	Mjällby AIF	1–1	IF Brommapojkarna	Hällevik
15:00 CEST (UTC+2)	Nwankwo 19'; Jagne (yellow card) 45+2'		Örqvist (yellow card) 31'; Vasić 88'	Stadium: Strandvallen; Referee: Mohammed Al-Hakim

12 May 2024 8	IFK Värnamo	1–1	IF Brommapojkarna	Värnamo
16:30 CEST (UTC+2)	Kalu 43'		Jakobsen 90'	Stadium: Finnvedsvallen; Referee: Fredrik Klitte

16 May 2024 9	IF Brommapojkarna	0–5	Djurgården	Vällingby
19:00 CEST (UTC+2)			Gulliksen 3'; Hümmet 53', 57', 85' (pen.); Nguen 80'	Stadium: Grimsta IP; Referee: Joakim Östling

19 May 2024 10	IF Brommapojkarna	2–1	IFK Norrköping	Vällingby
14:00 CEST (UTC+2)	Vasić 4', 45+4'		Nyman 24'	Stadium: Grimsta IP; Referee: Victor Wolf

26 May 2024 11	Västerås	1–1	IF Brommapojkarna	Västerås
16:30 CEST (UTC+2)	Ali 20'		Vasić 39'	Stadium: Hitachi Energy Arena; Referee: Richard Sundell

1 June 2024 12	IF Brommapojkarna	2–2	Malmö FF	Vällingby
15:00 CEST (UTC+2)	Vasić 24'; Heggem 65'		Kiese Thelin 23'; Cornelius 90+6'	Stadium: Grimsta IP; Referee: Glenn Nyberg

6 July 2024 13	IF Elfsborg	v	IF Brommapojkarna	Borås
15:00 CEST (UTC+2)				Stadium: Borås Arena

=== Svenska Cupen ===
Pos	Team	Pld	W	D	L	GF	GA	GD	Pts	Qualification	IFB	BKH	ÖFK	LAN
1	IF Brommapojkarna	3	2	1	0	5	1	+4	7	Advance to Knockout stage			1–0	3–0
2	BK Häcken	3	1	1	1	5	4	+1	4		1–1		2–0	
3	Östersunds FK	3	1	0	2	1	3	−2	3					1–0
4	Landskrona BoIS	3	1	0	2	3	6	−3	3			3–2		

Source: SvFF
Rules for classification: 1) Points; 2) Goal difference; 3) Goals scored; 4) Head-to-head record; 5) Lowest disciplinary points; 6) Highest ranked team

==== Group stage ====
17 February 2024 1	IF Brommapojkarna	3–0	Landskrona BoIS	Vällingby
13:00 CET (UTC+1)	Fritzson (yellow card) 12'; Andersson (yellow card) 17'; Ackermann 35'; Abrahamsson (yellow card) 36'; Pichkah (yellow card) 43'; Calisir 68'; Björkander 77'		Dzabic (yellow card) 20'	Stadium: Grimsta IP; Referee: Rinon Hasani

26 February 2024 1	IF Brommapojkarna	1–0	Östersund	Vällingby
18:30 CET (UTC+1)	Björkander 26'; Vasić (yellow card) 75'; Andersson (yellow card) 86'		Bonnah (yellow card) 69'; Sinyan (yellow card) 90+1'	Stadium: Grimsta IP; Referee: Granit Maqedonci

2 March 2024 3	Häcken	1–1	IF Brommapojkarna	Gothenburg
15:15 CET (UTC+1)	Youssef 5'; Lundqvist (yellow card) 39'; Zečević (yellow card) 84'; Lindberg (yellow card) 87'		Odefalk 45+4'; Sidklev (yellow card) 88'	Stadium: Bravida Arena; Referee: Fredrik Oppong

==== Knockout stage ====
9 March 2024 Quarter-finals	IF Brommapojkarna	0–1 (a.e.t.)	Halmstads BK	Vällingby
13:00 CET (UTC+1)	Calisir (yellow card) 41'; Björkander (yellow card) 53'; Vasić (yellow card) 71'; Pichkah (yellow card) 81' (yellow-red card) 109'; Irandust (yellow card) 113'		Baffoe (yellow card) 71'; Nogueira (yellow card) 76'; Al-Ammari (yellow card) 90+4'; Granath (yellow card) 97'; Phil Ofosu-Ayeh 112'; Wallentin (yellow card) 117'	Stadium: Grimsta IP; Referee: Victor Wolf
