= 2024 AIK Fotboll season =

AIK Fotboll
2024 season
- Manager: Henning Berg (until 14 June); Henok Goitom (from 17 June to 16 July); Mikkjal Thomassen (from 17 July)
- Stadium: Friends Arena
- Allsvenskan: 3rd
- 2023–24 Svenska Cupen: Semi-finals
- 2024–25 Svenska Cupen: Group stage (progressed to 2025)
- Top goalscorer: League: Ioannis Pittas (14); All: Ioannis Pittas (17)
- Average home league attendance: 28,589
- Biggest win: AIK 6–2 IFK Norrköping
- Biggest defeat: Malmö FF 5–0 AIK
Home colours	Away colours

The 2024 season was the 133rd season in the history of AIK Fotboll. The team participated in the top flight Allsvenskan, the 2023–24 Svenska Cupen, and the early rounds of the 2024–25 Svenska Cupen.

== Players ==
=== First-team squad ===
As of 20 February 2024

Note: Flags indicate national team as defined under FIFA eligibility rules; some limited exceptions apply. Players may hold more than one non-FIFA nationality.

No.	Pos.	Nation	Player
4	DF	SWE	Sotirios Papagiannopoulos
5	DF	SWE	Alexander Milošević (Captain)
6	MF	NOR	Martin Ellingsen
7	MF	SWE	Anton Salétros
8	MF	MLI	Ismaila Coulibaly (on loan from Sheffield United)
9	FW	PLE	Omar Faraj
10	MF	KOS	Bersant Celina
11	FW	SWE	John Guidetti
12	DF	SWE	Axel Björnström
15	GK	SWE	Kristoffer Nordfeldt
16	DF	DEN	Benjamin Tiedemann Hansen
17	DF	DEN	Mads Døhr Thychosen
18	MF	SWE	Abdihakin Ali
19	MF	BIH	Dino Beširović

No.	Pos.	Nation	Player
23	GK	SRB	Budimir Janošević
24	MF	ESP	Lamine Dabo
26	DF	SWE	Rasmus Bonde
28	FW	CYP	Ioannis Pittas
29	DF	KEN	Collins Sichenje
30	GK	MLI	Ismael Diawara
32	MF	POR	Rui Modesto
33	MF	SWE	Hugo Aviander
34	MF	SWE	Erik Ring
37	DF	SWE	Ahmad Faqa
39	FW	KEN	Henry Atola
43	MF	SWE	Victor Andersson
45	MF	SWE	Taha Ayari
47	FW	SWE	Alexander Fesshaie

=== Out on loan ===
As of 30 January 2024

Note: Flags indicate national team as defined under FIFA eligibility rules; some limited exceptions apply. Players may hold more than one non-FIFA nationality.

No.	Pos.	Nation	Player
20	MF	IRL	Zack Elbouzedi (on loan at Swindon Town until 30 June 2024)

== Transfers ==
=== In ===
Pos.	Player	Transferred from	Fee	Date	Source
DF	(Denmark) Benjamin Hansen	(Norway) Molde	Free	8 January 2024	
MF	(Kosovo) Bersant Celina	(France) Dijon	Free	8 January 2024	
GK	(Mali) Ismael Diawara	(Sweden) Malmö FF	Free	8 January 2024	
DF	(Norway) Martin Ellingsen	(Norway) Molde	Free	1 February 2024	
MF	(Mali) Ismaila Coulibaly	(England) Sheffield United	Loan	2 February 2024	
MF	(Norway) Eskil Edh	(Norway) Lillestrøm	€450,000	15 March 2024	

== Pre-season and friendlies ==
19 January 2024 Friendly	Slavia Praha (Czech Republic)	2–0	(Sweden) AIK	Almancil, Portugal
17:00	Dorley 67'; Ševčík 82'			Stadium: Estádio Algarve

27 January 2024 Friendly	IF Brommapojkarna (Sweden)	0–3	(Sweden) AIK	Vällingby
14:00	Renman (yellow card) 86'		Kusi-Asare 6', 25'; Ali 60'	Stadium: Grimsta IP

3 February 2024 Friendly	TSC (Serbia)	2–0	(Sweden) AIK	Benahavís, Spain
15:00	Antonić 15'; Milosavljević 38'			Stadium: Campo La Quinta

9 February 2024 Friendly	Sarpsborg (Norway)	2–0	(Sweden) AIK	Marbella, Spain
20:00	Sandberg 6'; Meister 78'			Stadium: Banús Football Center

25 February 2024 Friendly	AIK (Sweden)	1–1	(Sweden) Karlberg	Solna
14:00	Gono 69'		Lundgren 9'	Stadium: Skytteholms IP

26 March 2024 Friendly	AIK (Sweden)	4–0	(Norway) Vålerenga	Solna
16:30	Beširović 46'; Andersson 63'; Björnström 65'; Faraj 77' (pen.)		Rijks (yellow card) 21'	Stadium: Friends Arena

== Competitions ==
=== Overall record ===
Competition	First match	Last match	Starting round	Final position	Record							
Competition	First match	Last match	Starting round	Final position	Pld	W	D	L	GF	GA	GD	Win %
Allsvenskan	1 April 2024	November 2024	Matchday 1		19	9	2	8	31	34	−3	47.37
2023–24 Svenska Cupen	18 February 2024	17 March 2024	Group stage	Semi-final	5	3	2	0	9	4	+5	60.00
2024–25 Svenska Cupen	TBD		TBD		0	0	0	0	0	0	+0	—
Total					24	12	4	8	40	38	+2	50.00

Last updated: 18 August 2024
Source: Soccerway

=== Allsvenskan ===
==== League table ====
Pos	Team	Pld	W	D	L	GF	GA	GD	Pts	Qualification or relegation
1	Malmö FF (C)	30	19	8	3	67	25	+42	65	Qualification for the Champions League first qualifying round
2	Hammarby IF	30	16	6	8	48	25	+23	54	Qualification for the Conference League second qualifying round
3	AIK	30	17	3	10	46	41	+5	54	Qualification for the Conference League second qualifying round
4	Djurgårdens IF	30	16	5	9	45	35	+10	53	
5	Mjällby AIF	30	14	8	8	44	35	+9	50	

Source: svenskfotboll.se (in Swedish)
Rules for classification: 1) Points; 2) Goal difference; 3) Goals scored; 4) Head-to-head points; 5) Head-to-head goal difference; 6) Head-to-head away goals scored; 7) Play-off
(Note: Play-off is only played if need to decide champion, teams for relegation or UEFA competition and will be played on a neutral ground).
(C) Champions

==== Results summary ====
Overall								Home						Away					
Pld	W	D	L	GF	GA	GD	Pts	W	D	L	GF	GA	GD	W	D	L	GF	GA	GD
30	17	3	10	46	41	+5	54	10	1	4	29	15	+14	7	2	6	17	26	−9

Last updated: 10 November 2024.

==== Results by round ====
Round	1	2	3	4	5	6	7	8	9	10	11	12	13	14	15	16	17	18	19	20	21	22	23	24	25	26	27	28	29	30
Ground	H	A	A	H	H	A	H	H	A	A	H	A	H	A	A	H	A	H	A	H	A	H	A	A	H	H	A	H	A	H
Result	W	D	D	W	W	L	W	L	L	L	W	L	L	W	L	L	W	W	W	W	W	D	W	W	W	L	W	W	L	W
Position	6	6	7	2	2	3	2	6	7	8	7	8	10	8	8	11	10	9	8	7	5	7	5	4	3	4	3	3	3	3

Updated to match(es) played on 10 November 2024. Source: Worldfootball
A = Away; H = Home; W = Win; D = Draw; L = Loss

==== Matches ====
The first 12 rounds were unveiled on 16 January 2024.

1 April 2024 1	AIK	1–0	Västerås	Solna
16:30 CEST (UTC+2)	Modesto 53'	Report		Stadium: Friends Arena; Attendance: 36,602; Referee: Granit Maqedonci

6 April 2024 2	IF Brommapojkarna	2–2	AIK	Vällingby
15:00 CEST (UTC+2)	Fritzson 31'; Vasić (penalty missed) 90+2', 90+2'	Report	Modesto 53'; Ali 70'	Stadium: Grimsta IP; Attendance: 3,489; Referee: Kristoffer Karlsson

13 April 2024 3	Mjällby AIF	1–1	AIK	Hällevik
15:00 CEST (UTC+2)	Thychosen 73' (o.g.)	Report	Pittas 60'	Stadium: Strandvallen; Attendance: 4,138; Referee: Victor Wolf

21 April 2024 4	AIK	2–0	Djurgården	Solna
14:00 CEST (UTC+2)	Celina 57'; Pittas 75'	Report		Stadium: Friends Arena; Attendance: 44,734; Referee: Glenn Nyberg

24 April 2024 5	AIK	2–0	IFK Värnamo	Solna
19:00 CEST (UTC+2)	Edh 19'; Hansen 44'	Report		Stadium: Friends Arena; Attendance: 18,054; Referee: Tess Olofsson

28 April 2024 6	Malmö FF	5–0	AIK	Malmö
14:00 CEST (UTC+2)	Botheim 15'; Kiese Thelin 32', 71'; Hansen 45+1' (o.g.); Nanasi 57'	Report		Stadium: Eleda Stadion; Attendance: 21,495; Referee: Joakim Östling

5 May 2024 7	AIK	6–2	IFK Norrköping	Solna
16:30 CEST (UTC+2)	Beširović 15'; Døhr Thychosen 37'; Pittas 45+1', 76'; Coulibaly 69', 85'	Report	Nyman 48'; Traustason 52'	Stadium: Friends Arena; Attendance: 24,177; Referee: Oscar Johnson

11 May 2024 8	AIK	1–3	Sirius	Solna
15:00 CEST (UTC+2)	Celina 90+6'	Report	Milleskog 25'; Salech 53', 63'	Stadium: Friends Arena; Attendance: 25,289; Referee: Adam Ladebäck

15 May 2024 9	IF Elfsborg	6–1	AIK	Borås
19:00 CEST (UTC+2)	Abdullai 6', 18'; Qasem 45+1', 60', 89' (pen.); Baidoo 51'	Report	Celina 73'	Stadium: Borås Arena; Attendance: 9,205; Referee: Granit Maqedonci

19 May 2024 10	Hammarby	2–1	AIK	Stockholm
14:00 CEST (UTC+2)	Pinas 60'; Gül 74'	Report	Pittas 79'	Stadium: Tele2 Arena; Attendance: 27,204; Referee: Kristoffer Karlsson

27 May 2024 11	AIK	5–2	IFK Göteborg	Solna
19:10 CEST (UTC+2)	Faraj 34'; Salétros 67'; Svensson 75' (o.g.); Beširović 90+4'; Pittas 90+7'	Report	Pettersson 26'; Wendt 51'	Stadium: Friends Arena; Attendance: 25,932; Referee: Victor Wolf

2 June 2024 12	Häcken	4–1	AIK	Gothenburg
16:30 CEST (UTC+2)	Lunddal Friðriksson 21'; Chilufya 42'; Layouni 50'; Rygaard 53'	Report	Pittas 57'	Stadium: Bravida Arena; Attendance: 6,216; Referee: Joakim Östling

7 July 2024 13	AIK	1–2	Kalmar FF	Solna
14:00 CEST (UTC+2)	Pittas 63'	Report	Trenskow 34'; Gojani 75'	Stadium: Friends Arena; Attendance: 23,522; Referee: Fredrik Klitte

15 July 2024 14	Halmstads BK	1–2	AIK	Halmstad
19:00 CEST (UTC+2)	Granath 83'	Report	Modesto 14'; Pittas 57'	Stadium: Örjans Vall; Attendance: 10,504; Referee: Kristoffer Karlsson

22 July 2024 15	GAIS	2–0	AIK	Gothenburg
19:00 CEST (UTC+2)	Norén 40'; Holmström 81'	Report		Stadium: Gamla Ullevi; Attendance: 11,823; Referee: Oscar Johnson

29 July 2024 16	AIK	0–1	GAIS	Solna
19:00 CEST (UTC+2)		Report	Lundgren 3'	Stadium: Strawberry Arena; Attendance: 24,069; Referee: Adam Ladebäck

3 August 2024 17	Västerås	1–2	AIK	Västerås
15:00 CEST (UTC+2)	Granath 41'	Report	Modesto 25'; Beširović 34'	Stadium: Hitachi Energy Arena; Attendance: 8,679; Referee: Mohammed Al-Hakim

11 August 2024 18	AIK	1–0	Mjällby AIF	Solna
16:00 CEST (UTC+2)	Modesto 56'	Report		Stadium: Strawberry Arena; Attendance: 20,250; Referee: Joakim Östling

18 August 2024 19	Djurgården	0–2	AIK	Stockholm
14:00 CEST (UTC+2)		Report	Celina 39'; Modesto 63'	Stadium: Tele2 Arena; Attendance: 26,225; Referee: Victor Wolf

25 August 2024 20	AIK	2–1	IF Brommapojkarna	Solna
16:30 CEST (UTC+2)	Pittas 34' (yellow card) 38'; Salétros 45+4'; Ayari (yellow card) 61'; Diawara (yellow card) 90+6'	Report	Timossi Andersson 10'; Abrahamsson (yellow card) 45+3'; Örqvist (yellow card) 82'	Stadium: Strawberry Arena; Attendance: 23,051; Referee: (Sweden) Fredrik Klitte

31 August 2024 21	IFK Värnamo	0–1	AIK	Värnamo
15:00 CEST (UTC+2)		Report	Pittas 4'; Thychosen (yellow card) 57'	Stadium: Finnvedsvallen; Attendance: 3,358; Referee: (Sweden) Granit Maqedonci

15 September 2024 22	AIK	0–0	Malmö FF	Solna
14:00 CEST (UTC+2)	Salétros (yellow card) 64'; Milošević (yellow card) 67'	Report	Kiese Thelin (yellow card) 30'; Bolin (yellow card) 37'; Ali (yellow card) 65'	Stadium: Strawberry Arena; Attendance: 27,595; Referee: (Sweden) Mohammed Al-Hakim

21 September 2024 23	Kalmar FF	0–1	AIK	Kalmar
15:00 CEST (UTC+2)	Karlsson (yellow card) 36'; Islamović (yellow card) 85'	Report	Valakari (yellow card) 19' (goal) 49'	Stadium: Guldfågeln Arena; Attendance: 6,959; Referee: (Sweden) Adam Ladebäck

25 September 2024 24	IK Sirius	0–1	AIK	Uppsala
19:00 CEST (UTC+2)	Wikman (yellow card) 8'; Walta (yellow card) 44'; Andreas Murbeck (yellow card) 90+9'	Report	Hansen 62'; Milošević (yellow card) 90+9'	Stadium: Studenternas IP; Attendance: 10,071; Referee: (Sweden) Kristoffer Karlsson

29 September 2024 25	AIK	1–0	Hammarby IF	Solna
14:00 CEST (UTC+2)	Lamine Fanne (yellow card) 29'; Guidetti 90+2'; Thychosen (yellow card) 90+8' (yellow-red card) 90+8'	Report	Strand (yellow card) 90+8' (yellow-red card) 90+8'	Stadium: Strawberry Arena; Attendance: 47,129; Referee: (Sweden) Glenn Nyberg

6 October 2024 26	AIK	0–2	BK Häcken	Solna
14:00 CEST (UTC+2)	Beširović (yellow card) 36'; Pittas (yellow card) 43'	Report	Gustafson 56' (yellow card) 57'; Youssef 73'; Srđan Hrstić (yellow card) 90+2'	Stadium: Strawberry Arena; Attendance: 24,030; Referee: (Sweden) Richard Sundell

21 October 2024 27	IFK Göteborg	1–2	AIK	Gothenburg
19:00 CEST (UTC+2)	Erlingmark (yellow card) 58'; Ohlsson (yellow card) 77' (goal) 88'	Report	Beširović 30' (yellow card) 52'; Milošević (yellow card) 88'; Hansen 90+6'	Stadium: Gamla Ullevi; Attendance: 17,165; Referee: (Sweden) Oscar Johnson

27 October 2024 28	AIK	2–1	IF Elfsborg	Solna
14:00 CET (UTC+1)	Pittas 2'; Beširović 68'; Edh (yellow card) 90+4'	Report	Ouma (yellow card) 71'; Hedlund 82' (pen.)	Stadium: Strawberry Arena; Attendance: 27,177; Referee: (Sweden) Adam Ladebäck

4 November 2024 29	IFK Norrköping	1–0	AIK	Norrköping
19:00 CET (UTC+1)	Dino Salihovic (yellow card) 20'; Pittas 26' (o.g.); Kalley (yellow card) 89'	Report	Andersson (yellow card) 45+3'; Hansen (yellow card) 85'	Stadium: PlatinumCars Arena; Attendance: 14,112; Referee: (Sweden) Glenn Nyberg

10 November 2024 30	AIK	5–1	Halmstads BK	Solna
15:15 CET (UTC+1)	Celina (yellow card) 19'; Pittas 29' 88'; Nordfeldt (yellow card) 38'; Valakari 44'; Edh 45+1'; Milošević (yellow card) 52'; Salétros 60'	Report	Agnero (yellow card) 17' (goal) 32'; Gabriel Wallentin (red card) 36'; Boman (yellow card) 38'	Stadium: Strawberry Arena; Attendance: 37,229; Referee: (Sweden) Kristoffer Karlsson

=== Svenska Cupen ===
Pos	Team	Pld	W	D	L	GF	GA	GD	Pts	Qualification	AIK	ÖSK	KFF	GEF
1	AIK	3	2	1	0	5	2	+3	7	Advance to Knockout stage		3–1		1–0
2	Örebro SK	3	2	0	1	4	4	0	6				1–0	
3	Kalmar FF	3	1	1	1	4	3	+1	4		1–1			3–1
4	Gefle IF	3	0	0	3	2	6	−4	0			1–2		

Source: SvFF
Rules for classification: 1) Points; 2) Goal difference; 3) Goals scored; 4) Head-to-head record; 5) Lowest disciplinary points; 6) Highest ranked team

==== Group stage ====
18 February 2024 1	AIK	3–1	Örebro	Johanneshov
15:15 CET (UTC+1)	Pittas 18'; Modesto 74'; Faraj 90+3' (pen.)	Report	Holmberg 18'	Stadium: Tele2 Arena; Attendance: 14,881; Referee: Adi Aganovic

24 February 2024 2	AIK	1–0	Gefle	Johanneshov
15:15 CET (UTC+1)	Salétros 83'	Report		Stadium: Tele2 Arena; Attendance: 12,174; Referee: Glenn Nyberg

3 March 2024 3	Kalmar FF	1–1	AIK	Kalmar
15:15 CET (UTC+1)	Trenskow 66'	Report	Modesto 41'	Stadium: Fredriksskans; Attendance: 3,187; Referee: Adam Ladebäck

==== Knockout stage ====
9 March 2024 Quarter-finals	Mjällby AIF	1–3	AIK	Hällevik
16:00 CET (UTC+1)	Gustavsson (yellow card) 18'; Johansson 42' (pen.)	Report	Modesto 7'; Faraj 11', (yellow card) 38'; Celina (yellow card) 22'; Pittas 59'	Stadium: Strandvallen; Attendance: 2,477; Referee: Fredrik Klitte

17 March 2024 Semi-finals	AIK	1–1 (a.e.t.) (2–3 p)	Djurgården	Stockholm
15:00 CET (UTC+1)	Thychosen (yellow card) 9'; Björnström (yellow card) 25'; Andersson 90+5'; Ayari (yellow card) 100'	Report	Dahl (yellow card) 9'; Bergvall 14'; Samuel Leach Holm (yellow card) 36'; Gulliksen (yellow card) 95'; Sabovic (yellow card) 96'	Stadium: Friends Arena; Attendance: 36,910; Referee: Mohammed Al-Hakim
	Penalties
	Pittas (penalty scored); Salétros (penalty missed); Celina (penalty scored); Ring (penalty missed); Ayari (penalty missed)		(penalty scored) Danielson; (penalty missed) Ekdal; (penalty scored) Gulliksen; (penalty scored) Hümmet
