= 2025 AIK Fotboll season =

AIK Fotboll
2025 season
- Manager: Mikkjal Thomassen
- Stadium: Strawberry Arena
- Allsvenskan: 4th
- 2024–25 Svenska Cupen: Group stage
- UEFA Conference League: Second qualifying round
- Top goalscorer: League: Johan Hove (6); All: Johan Hove (6)
- Average home league attendance: 30,024
Home colours	Away colours	Third colours

The 2025 season will be the 134th season for AIK Fotboll club. During this season the club will participate in the following competitions: Allsvenskan, Svenska Cupen, UEFA Conference League.

== First-team squad ==
Note: Flags indicate national team as defined under FIFA eligibility rules; some limited exceptions apply. Players may hold more than one non-FIFA nationality.

No.	Pos.	Nation	Player
2	DF	NOR	Eskil Edh
3	DF	SWE	Thomas Isherwood
4	DF	SWE	Sotirios Papagiannopoulos
5	MF	SWE	Kazper Karlsson
6	MF	NOR	Martin Ellingsen
7	MF	SWE	Anton Salétros (captain)
8	MF	NOR	Johan Hove
10	MF	KOS	Bersant Celina
11	FW	SWE	John Guidetti
12	DF	SWE	Charlie Pavey
14	DF	SWE	Fredrik Nissen
15	GK	SWE	Kristoffer Nordfeldt
16	DF	DEN	Benjamin Tiedemann Hansen
17	DF	DEN	Mads Døhr Thychosen
18	MF	SWE	Abdihakim Ali
19	MF	BIH	Dino Beširović
20	MF	SWE	Oscar Uddenäs (on loan from Excelsior)
20	FW	NOR	Erik Flataker

No.	Pos.	Nation	Player
21	MF	KEN	Stanley Wilson
22	DF	FIN	Jere Uronen
22	MF	SWE	Adrian Helm
24	MF	SWE	Andreas Redkin
26	DF	SWE	Elvis van der Laan
28	MF	SWE	Linus Järeteg
29	FW	IRQ	Danilo Al-Saed (on loan from Heerenveen)
29	FW	SWE	Kevin Filling
30	GK	SWE	Kalle Joelsson
32	DF	CRO	Filip Benković
33	MF	HUN	Áron Csongvai
36	MF	NGA	Zadok Yohanna
43	MF	SWE	Victor Andersson
45	FW	SWE	Taha Ayari
46	MF	SWE	Yannick Geiger
47	FW	SWE	Alexander Fesshaie
48	MF	CIV	Axel Kouame

== Club Friendlies ==
16 January 2025 Friendly	AIK (Sweden)	0–2	(Czech Republic) Viktoria Plzeň	Stockholm
15:15	Emmanuel Gono (yellow card) 25'; Isherwood (yellow card) 31'	Report	Adu 20'; Marković (yellow card) 25'; Kalvach (yellow card) 31'; Šulc 49'	Stadium: Strawberry Arena

20 January 2025 Friendly	AIK (Sweden)	1–0	(Norway) Molde	Stockholm
15:00	Emmanuel Gono 85'	Report		Stadium: Strawberry Arena

25 January 2025 Friendly	Brommapojkarna (Sweden)	3–0	(Sweden) AIK	Stockholm
13:00	Andersson 3'; Ezekiel Alladoh 6'; Lind 38'	Report		Stadium: Grimsta IP

1 February 2025 Friendly	AGF (Denmark)	1–0	(Sweden) AIK	Aarhus
14:00	Mortensen 15'	Report		Stadium: Ceres Park

7 February 2025 Friendly	AIK (Sweden)	1–0	(Denmark) Nordsjælland	Stockholm
14:00	Fesshaie 48'	Report		Stadium: Strawberry Arena

10 February 2025 Friendly	AIK (Sweden)	0–2	(Norway) KFUM Oslo	Stockholm
14:00	Stanley Wilson (yellow card) 47'; Thychosen (yellow card) 47'	Report	Nuñez 27' 44'	Stadium: Strawberry Arena

8 March 2025 Friendly	AIK (Sweden)	4–2	(Sweden) Sirius	Stockholm
13:00	Thychosen 35' 75'; Andreas Redkin 36'; Isherwood 60'	Report	Saba Mamatsashvili 83'; Walta 90'	Stadium: Strawberry Arena

22 March 2025 Friendly	Rosenborg (Norway)	2–0	(Sweden) AIK	Trondheim
11:30	Islamović 51'; Pereira 73'	Report		Stadium: Lerkendal Stadion

19 June 2025 Friendly	AIK (Sweden)	1–2	(Sweden) Sirius	Stockholm
13:00	Beširović (red card) 36'; Hove 79'	Report	Bjerkebo 14'; Heier (yellow card) 36'; August Ljungberg 64'	Stadium: Strawberry Arena

== Allsvenskan ==
=== Results summary ===
Overall								Home						Away					
Pld	W	D	L	GF	GA	GD	Pts	W	D	L	GF	GA	GD	W	D	L	GF	GA	GD
20	9	7	4	25	18	+7	34	5	4	0	14	4	+10	4	3	4	11	14	−3

Last updated: 17 August 2025.
Source: soccerway

==== Results by round ====
Round	1	2	3	4	5	6	7	8	9	10	11	12	13	14	15	16	17	18	19	20	21	22
Ground	A	H	H	A	A	H	A	H	A	H	A	A	H	A	H	A	H	A	H	A	A	H
Result	W	W	D	W	W	W	D	W	D	D	W	L	W	L	W	L	D	D	D	L		
Position	6	3	2	1	1	1	2	1	1	3	2	4	3	3	3	3	5	5	5	6		

Updated to match(es) played on 17 August 2025. Source: worldfootball
A = Away; H = Home; W = Win; D = Draw; L = Loss

=== Matches ===
31 March 2025 1	GAIS	0-1	AIK	Göteborg
19:00	Edvin Becirovic (yellow card) 23'; Hedlund (yellow card) 74'; Beckman (yellow card) 78'; Milovanovic (yellow card) 79'	Report	Isherwood (yellow card) 57'; Csongvai (yellow card) 73'; Celina 90+2' (yellow card) 90+2'	Stadium: Gamla Ullevi; Attendance: 15,046; Referee: (Sweden) Mohammed Al-Hakim

6 April 2025 2	AIK	4-3	Norrköping	Stockholm
14:00	Csongvai 59'; Guidetti 74' (yellow card) 76'; Thychosen 84'; Hove 90'	Report	Papagiannopoulos 25' (o.g.); Ceesay (yellow card) 58'; Nyman 62' 71'; Kojo Oppong (yellow card) 77'	Stadium: Strawberry Arena; Attendance: 38,525; Referee: (Sweden) Granit Maqedonci

14 April 2025 3	AIK	0-0	Malmö FF	Stockholm
19:10	Isherwood (yellow card) 24'	Report	Hakšabanović (yellow card) 82'; Sigurðsson (yellow card) 84'	Stadium: Strawberry Arena; Attendance: 28,472; Referee: (Sweden) Joakim Östling

20 April 2025 4	Östers IF	0-1	AIK	Växjö
14:00	Lukas Bergquist (yellow card) 17'; Sanyang (yellow card) 22'; Niklas Söderberg (yellow card) 45+2'; Daniel Ljung (yellow card) 78'; Kričak (yellow card) 79'	Report	Isherwood (yellow card) 40'; Salétros (yellow card) 51'; Csongvai (yellow card) 57'; Celina 80'; Beširović (yellow card) 90+4'	Stadium: Spiris Arena; Attendance: 11,685; Referee: (Sweden) Oscar Johnson

24 April 2025 5	IFK Värnamo	1-2	AIK	Värnamo
19:00	Grozdanic 80'	Report	Beširović (yellow card) 34'; Thychosen 42'; Hove 87'	Stadium: Finnvedsvallen; Attendance: 3,235; Referee: (Sweden) Adi Aganović

27 April 2025 6	AIK	2-0	Elfsborg	Stockholm
16:00	Hove 3'; Guidetti 19'; Fesshaie (yellow card) 80'; Andersson (yellow card) 85'	Report		Stadium: Strawberry Arena; Attendance: 27,079; Referee: (Sweden) Fredrik Klitte

4 May 2025 7	Djurgården	1-1	AIK	Stockholm
14:00	Gulliksen (yellow card) 21'; Danielson 26' (pen.); Sawo (yellow card) 55'; Tenho (yellow card) 70' (yellow-red card) 80'; Bergvall (yellow card) 90'	Report	Isherwood (yellow card) 23'; Papagiannopoulos (yellow card) 24'; Salétros 83'; Andersson (yellow card) 90'	Stadium: 3Arena; Attendance: 26,246; Referee: (Sweden) Glenn Nyberg

11 May 2025 8	AIK	2-1	Mjällby	Stockholm
14:00	Andersson 23'; Csongvai (yellow card) 27'; Salétros 61'; Nordfeldt (yellow card) 90+1'	Report	Stroud 10'; Norén (yellow card) 21'; Johansson (yellow card) 82'	Stadium: Strawberry Arena; Attendance: 28,448; Referee: (Sweden) Richard Sundell

14 May 2025 9	Häcken	3-3	AIK	Göteborg
19:00	Berisha (yellow card) 16'; Filip Öhman (yellow card) 53'; Leach Holm 58' 90+2'; Severin Nioule 62'; Andersen (yellow card) 85'	Report	Hansen 16' (yellow card) 26'; Salétros (yellow card) 30'; Andersson 69'; Kakoullis 72'	Stadium: Bravida Arena; Attendance: 5,884; Referee: (Sweden) Kristoffer Karlsson

18 May 2025 10	AIK	0-0	Hammarby	Stockholm
14:00	Celina (yellow card) 11'; Beširović (yellow card) 43'; Isherwood (yellow card) 90+2'	Report	Vagić (yellow card) 11'; Tounekti (yellow card) 12'; Boudah (yellow card) 90+2'	Stadium: Strawberry Arena; Attendance: 47,727; Referee: (Sweden) Mohammed Al-Hakim

22 May 2025 18	Malmö FF	0-0	AIK	Malmö
19:00		Report	Csongvai (yellow card) 58'	Stadium: Eleda Stadion; Attendance: 21,269; Referee: (Sweden) Mohammed Al-Hakim

25 May 2025 11	Brommapojkarna	0-1	AIK	Stockholm
16:30	Jakobsen (yellow card) 90+8'	Report	Benković (yellow card) 20'; Hove 44'; Beširović (yellow card) 48'; Thomassen (yellow card) 50'; Salétros (yellow card) 61' (yellow-red card) 78'; Nordfeldt (yellow card) 64'; Guidetti (yellow card) 90'	Stadium: Grimsta IP; Attendance: 4,118; Referee: (Sweden) Fredrik Klitte

1 June 2025 12	Sirius	3-1	AIK	Uppsala
16:30	Widgren 7'; Ure 34'; Voelkerling Persson (yellow card) 52'; Bjerkebo 65'; Andreas Engelmark (yellow card) 72'; Milovanov (yellow card) 89'	Report	Beširović (yellow card) 45+3'; Thychosen (yellow card) 54'; Hove 57'; Papagiannopoulos (yellow card) 89'	Stadium: Studenternas IP; Attendance: 10,135; Referee: (Sweden) Granit Maqedonci

29 June 2025 13	AIK	3-0	IFK Göteborg	Stockholm
14:00	Hove (yellow card) 11' (goal) 61'; Benković 30'; Kevin Filling 43'	Report	Jagne (yellow card) 29'; Santos (yellow card) 67'	Stadium: Strawberry Arena; Attendance: 38,172; Referee: (Sweden) Oscar Johnson

6 July 2025 14	Halmstad	2-0	AIK	Halmstad
14:00	Chrupałła 20'; Mohammed 29'	Report	Thychosen (yellow card) 90+1'	Stadium: Örjans Vall; Attendance: 9,776; Referee: (Sweden) Adi Aganović

13 July 2025 15	AIK	3-0	Degerfors	Stockholm
16:30	Kakoullis 30' 64'; Celina 90+2'	Report	Ohlsson (yellow card) 9'; Maill Lundgren (yellow card) 66'	Stadium: Strawberry Arena; Attendance: 27,229; Referee: (Sweden) Granit Maqedonci

20 July 2025 16	Mjällby	2-0	AIK	Hällevik
14:00	Hove 55' (o.g.); Gustavsson (yellow card) 58'; Malachowski Thorell (yellow card) 66'; Ludvig Tidstrand 83'	Report	Salétros (yellow card) 45+3'; Nordfeldt (yellow card) 49'; Beširović (yellow card) 55'	Stadium: Strandvallen; Attendance: 5,982; Referee: (Sweden) Fredrik Klitte

27 July 2025 17	AIK	0-0	Östers IF	Stockholm
14:00	Csongvai (yellow card) 66'	Report		Stadium: Strawberry Arena; Attendance: 23,458; Referee: (Sweden) Victor Wolf

10 August 2025 19	AIK	0-0	Djurgården	Stockholm
14:00	Beširović (yellow card) 29'; Thychosen (yellow card) 84'	Report	Gulliksen (yellow card) 76'; Anderson (yellow card) 85'	Stadium: Strawberry Arena; Attendance: 45,922; Referee: (Sweden) Adam Ladebäck

17 August 2025 20	IFK Göteborg	2-1	AIK	Göteborg
14:00	Kruse (yellow card) 34'; Heintz 37' 55'; Erlingmark (yellow card) 90+7'	Report	Csongvai (yellow card) 6' (yellow-red card) 90+6'; Isherwood 60'	Stadium: Gamla Ullevi; Attendance: 17,023; Referee: (Sweden) Mohammed Al-Hakim

24 August 2025 21	Degerfors	-	AIK	Degerfors
16:30				Stadium: Stora Valla

== Svenska Cupen ==
20 August 2025 Second Round	Hudiksvalls FF	-	AIK	Hudiksvall
18:00				Stadium: Glysisvallen

== UEFA Conference League ==
24 July 2025 Second Qualifying Round First Leg	Paide (Estonia)	0-2	(Sweden) AIK	Tallinn
18:30	Milan Delevic (yellow card) 36'	Report	Celina 7'; Csongvai 68'	Stadium: Kadriorg Stadium; Attendance: 3,286; Referee: (Finland) Joni Hyytiä

31 July 2025 Second Qualifying Round Second Leg	AIK (Sweden)	6-0 (8-0 agg.)	(Estonia) Paide	Stockholm
19:00	Baranov 16' (o.g.); Miller 24' (o.g.); Hove 45' 54'; Salétros 50' (pen.) 76'; Csongvai (yellow card) 81'	Report	Ojamaa (yellow card) 82'; Baranov (yellow card) 90'	Stadium: Strawberry Arena; Attendance: 16,374; Referee: (Iceland) Helgi Mikael Jónasson

7 August 2025 Third Qualifying Round First Leg	AIK (Sweden)	2-1	(Hungary) Győri ETO	Stockholm
19:00	Beširović 7'; Celina 21'; Papagiannopoulos (yellow card) 73'	Report	Vitális 78'	Stadium: Strawberry Arena; Attendance: 17,842; Referee: (Germany) Daniel Schlager

14 August 2025 Third Qualifying Round Second Leg	Győri ETO (Hungary)	-	(Sweden) AIK	Győr
19:00				Stadium: ETO Park
