= Zadok Yohanna =

Nigerian footballer (born 2007)

Personal information
- Full name: Zadok Abu Yohanna
- Date of birth: 29 June 2007 (age 19)
- Place of birth: Bauchi State, Nigeria
- Height: 1.81 m (5 ft 11 in)
- Position: Right winger

Team information
- Current team: Brighton & Hove Albion
- Number: 36

Youth career
- –2025: Ikon Allah FC
- 2025: AIK

Senior career*
Years	Team	Apps	(Gls)
2025–2026	AIK	13	(2)
2026–	Brighton & Hove Albion	1	(0)
- * Club domestic league appearances and goals as of 23 August 2026

Zadok Abu Yohanna (English: /ˈzʌdɒk jɒˈhʌnʌ/; born 29 June 2007) is a Nigerian professional footballer who plays as a right winger for Premier League club Brighton & Hove Albion.

Yohanna began his career at the Ikon Allah Football Academy in Nigeria before being recruited by Swedish club AIK in 2025, where he played in the first team during the 2026 season. In June 2026, Yohanna signed for Brighton & Hove Albion for €28 million, breaking the Swedish transfer fee record.

== Club career ==
=== Early career ===
Zadok Yohanna was born and raised in Bauchi, Nigeria, and belongs to the Sawaya Ethnic Group. At the age of approximately 12–13, he left his family to relocate independently to Kaduna, where he began playing for the Ikon Allah Academy.

=== AIK ===
==== 2025–2026: Development and breakthrough ====
Yohanna was signed by AIK on 29 June 2025, agreeing to a contract that runs until 31 December 2029. Yohanna began his spell at AIK playing for the club’s under-19 side, where he scored four goals in three matches in the P19 Allsvenskan. It did not take long before head coach Mikkjal Thomassen began integrating Yohanna into first-team training on a regular basis.

He made his debut for the club on 17 August 2025, coming on as a substitute in the 89th minute against IFK Göteborg at Gamla Ullevi in a match that AIK lost 2–1. Three days later, in the following match, Yohanna made his first start for AIK, playing the full game in the qualification round for the 2025–26 Svenska Cupen against Hudiksvalls FF, which AIK won convincingly 7–0.

On 9 March 2026, Yohanna scored his first two goals for AIK as the team defeated BK Häcken 4–0 at Strawberry Arena, securing qualification for the quarter-finals of the Swedish Cup. In the quarter-final against GAIS, Yohanna continued his scoring form by netting one of AIK’s goals, heading in a cross from Áron Csongvai in the second half. However, AIK lost the match 3–2 and were eliminated from the cup.

On April 5, 2026, in the first league game of the season at Strawberry Arena, Yohanna scored his first league goal Transfer speculation began to intensify. In April, reports emerged linking German clubs such as Borussia Dortmund, RB Leipzig and Bayer Leverkusen with the player. Yohanna maintained his strong form throughout the spring of 2026 and scored AIK’s only goal in a 1–1 draw against IF Elfsborg at Borås Arena on 3 May. In the following match, on 10 May, he registered an assist for Kevin Filling in a 4–2 defeat to Djurgårdens IF.

=== Brighton & Hove Albion ===
On 6 June 2026, it was announced that Yohanna would transfer to English Premier League club Brighton & Hove Albion when the transfer window opened on 15 June. He signed a five-year contract with the club.

== International career ==
In May 2026, Yohanna received his first-ever call-up to the Nigerian national team, which was set to participate in the four-nation Unity Cup tournament in London. The following day, his club, AIK, announced that it had decided not to release him for international duty, as Yohanna was in a crucial final stage of his rehabilitation from a hamstring injury.

== Style of play ==
A left-footed player, Yohanna primarily features on the right wing, though he can also operate in an attacking midfield role.

As Yohanna established himself in the AIK side during the 2026 season under head coach José Riveiro, he was deployed as a right winger in a 4–3–3 system.

== Personal life ==
Yohanna is a Christian. His given name is of Hebrew origin meaning “righteous,” from the biblical name Zadok. In Bauchi State, where Yohanna grew up, Christians comprise approximately 45% of the population.

== Career statistics ==
As of match played 27 August 2026

Appearances and goals by club, season and competition
Club	Season	League			National cup (Note: Includes Svenska Cupen)		League Cup		Europe		Total	
Club	Season	Division	Apps	Goals	Apps	Goals	Apps	Goals	Apps	Goals	Apps	Goals
AIK	2025	Allsvenskan	6	0	1	0	—		—		7	0
AIK	2026	Allsvenskan	7	2	4	3	—		—		11	5
AIK	Total		13	2	5	3	—		—		18	5
Brighton & Hove Albion	2026–27	Premier League	1	0	0	0	0	0	2 (Note: Appearances in UEFA Conference League)	0	3	0
Career total			14	2	5	3	0	0	2	0	21	5
