= Ioannis Pittas =

Cypriot footballer

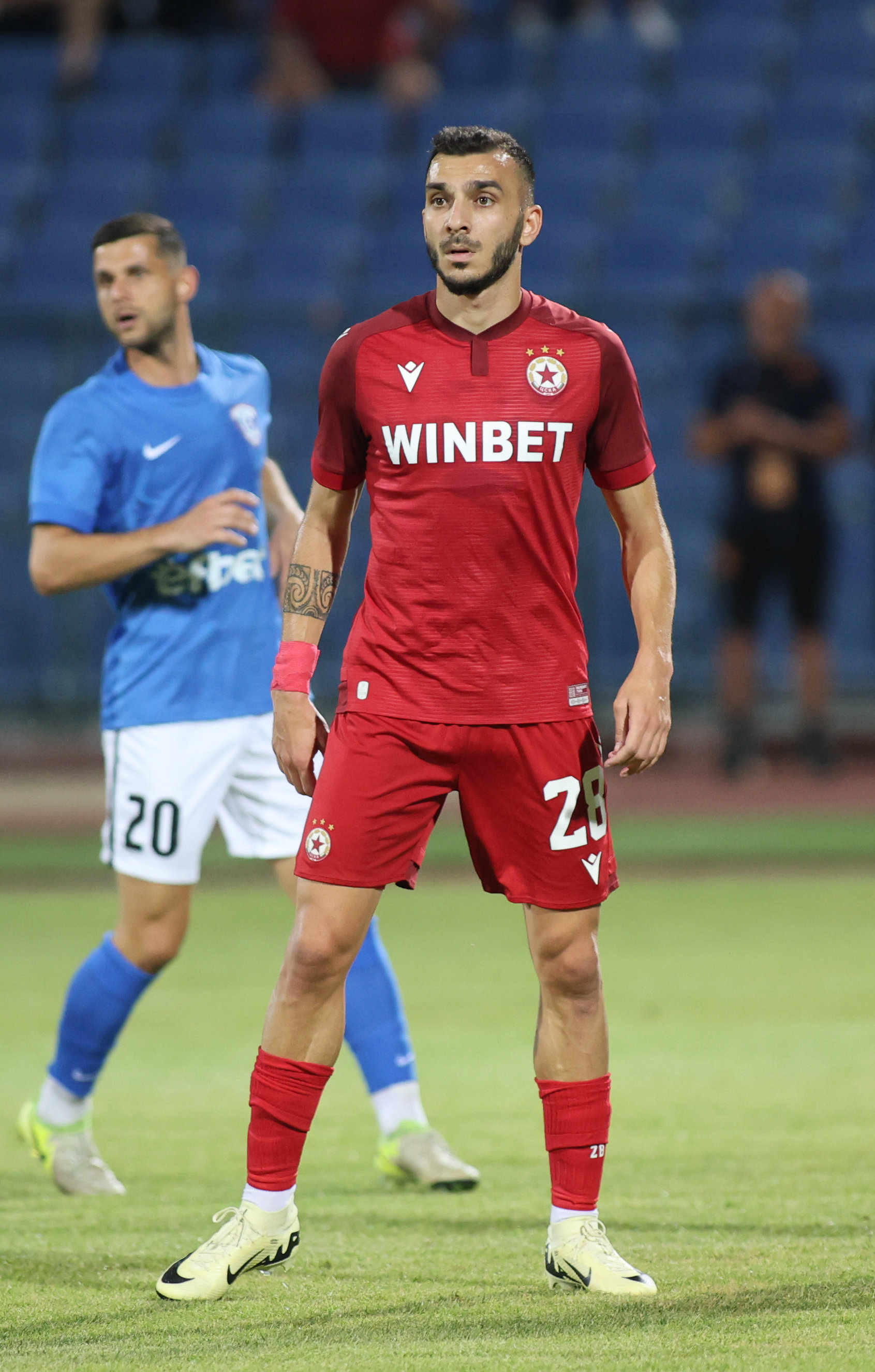

Personal information
- Full name: Ioannis Pittas
- Date of birth: 10 July 1996 (age 30)
- Place of birth: Limassol, Cyprus
- Height: 1.80 m (5 ft 11 in)
- Position: Forward

Team information
- Current team: CSKA Sofia
- Number: 28

Senior career*
Years	Team	Apps	(Gls)
2015–2023	Apollon Limassol	137	(45)
2018–2019	→ Enosis Neon Paralimni (loan)	28	(9)
2023–2025	AIK	43	(23)
2025–	CSKA Sofia	67	(22)

International career^{‡}
2015–2018	Cyprus U21	19	(2)
2019–	Cyprus	64	(12)
- * Club domestic league appearances and goals as of 18:01, 22 November 2026 (UTC) ‡ National team caps and goals as of 20:30, 15 November 2026 (UTC)

Ioannis Pittas (Greek: Ιωάννης Πίττας; born 10 July 1996) is a Cypriot professional footballer who plays as a forward for Bulgarian First League club CSKA Sofia and the Cyprus national team.

== Club career ==
=== AIK ===
On 30 June 2023, Pittas was signed by AIK, where he signed a contract until 30 November 2025. According to some information, AIK paid 800,000 euros for the player's signature.

Pittas scored his first goal for the club in his debut when the team played 1–1 away against Kalmar FF. On 24 September 2023, Pittas became a big derby hero for AIK when he scored both goals in a 2–0 win against arch-rivals Djurgårdens IF at Friends Arena. In the final round of Allsvenskan 2023, Pittas scored a hat-trick in 14 minutes against IFK Värnamo, securing AIK's stay in the league for the 2024 season. Pittas ended the season as the club's top scorer with nine goals in 13 Allsvenskan matches, despite the fact that he played fewer matches then the runner-up Rui Modesto with six goals.

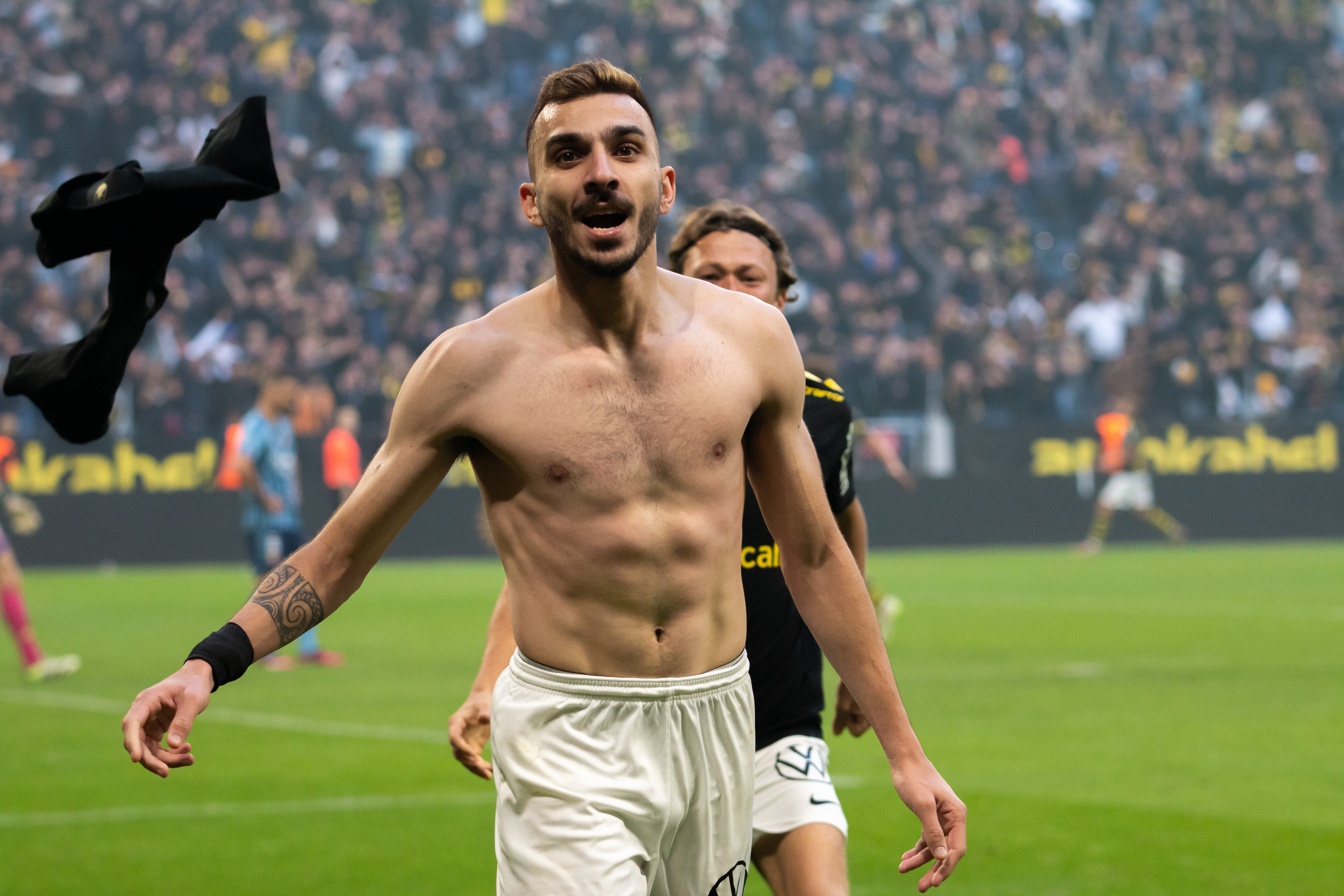
Pittas celebrates after scoring against Djurgårdens IF, September 2023

On 5 May 2024, Pittas recorded two goals and two assists in a 6–2 win over IFK Norrköping at Friends Arena.

== International career ==
He made his Cyprus national team debut on 8 June 2019 in a Euro 2020 qualifier against Scotland, as an 80th-minute substitute for Andreas Makris.

== Personal life ==
He is the son of former Apollon Limassol and Cyprus international defender Pambos Pittas.

== Career statistics ==
As of match played 22 November 2026

Appearances and goals by club, season and competition
Club	Season	League			National cup (Note: Includes Cypriot Cup, Svenska Cupen, Bulgarian Cup)		Continental		Other		Total	
Club	Season	Division	Apps	Goals	Apps	Goals	Apps	Goals	Apps	Goals	Apps	Goals
Apollon Limassol	2014–15	Cypriot First Division	0	0	0	0	—		—		0	0
Apollon Limassol	2015–16	Cypriot First Division	11	0	0	0	0	0	—		11	0
Apollon Limassol	2016–17	Cypriot First Division	7	2	4	0	1 (Note: Appearances in UEFA Europa League)	0	—		12	2
Apollon Limassol	2017–18	Cypriot First Division	6	0	2	0	4	1	—		12	1
Apollon Limassol	2018–19	Cypriot First Division	0	0	0	0	2	0	—		2	0
Apollon Limassol	2019–20	Cypriot First Division	19	2	5	1	8	1	—		32	4
Apollon Limassol	2020–21	Cypriot First Division	34	13	1	0	3	0	—		38	13
Apollon Limassol	2021–22	Cypriot First Division	25	10	3	0	2 (Note: Appearances in UEFA Europa Conference League)	0	—		30	10
Apollon Limassol	2022–23	Cypriot First Division	35	18	1	0	10 (Note: Two appearances in UEFA Champions League, two appearances and one goal in UEFA Europa League, six appearances and one goal in UEFA Europa Conference League)	2	1 (Note: Appearance in Cypriot Super Cup)	0	47	20
Apollon Limassol	Total		137	45	16	1	30	4	1	0	184	50
Enosis Neon Paralimni (loan)	2018–19	Cypriot First Division	28	9	7	4	—		—		35	13
AIK	2023	Allsvenskan	13	9	6	3	—		—		19	12
AIK	2024	Allsvenskan	30	14	6	3	—		—		36	17
AIK	Total		43	23	12	6	0	0	0	0	55	29
CSKA Sofia	2024–25	Bulgarian First League	17	7	4	3	–		1 (Note: Appearance in Bulgarian First League European play-off final)	0	22	10
CSKA Sofia	2025–26	Bulgarian First League	36	8	6	2	–		–		42	10
CSKA Sofia	2026–27	Bulgarian First League	14	7	1	1	11	3	1	0	27	11
CSKA Sofia	Total		27	22	11	6	11	3	2	0	91	31
Career total			275	99	46	17	41	8	2	0	365	123

=== International ===
As of match played 15 November 2026

Appearances and goals by national team, year and competition
National team	Year	Apps	Goals
Cyprus
Cyprus	2019	4	0
Cyprus	2020	8	0
Cyprus	2021	10	1
Cyprus	2022	8	1
Cyprus	2023	7	2
Cyprus	2024	10	4
Cyprus	2025	7	3
Cyprus	2026	10	1
Total		64	12

International goals

Scores and results list Cyprus's goal tally first.

No.	Date	Venue	Opponent	Score	Result	Competition
1	30 March 2021	GSP Stadium, Nicosia, Cyprus	Slovenia	1–0	1–0	2022 FIFA World Cup qualification
2	20 November 2022	HaMoshava Stadium, Petah Tikva, Israel	Israel	2–0	3–2	Friendly
3	17 June 2023	AEK Arena – Georgios Karapatakis, Larnaca, Cyprus	Georgia	1–1	1–2	UEFA Euro 2024 qualifying
4	19 November 2023	Alphamega Stadium, Limassol, Cyprus	Lithuania	1–0	1–0	Friendly
5	21 March 2024	AEK Arena – Georgios Karapatakis, Larnaca, Cyprus	Latvia	1–0	1–1	Friendly
6	8 June 2024	Zimbru Stadium, Chișinău, Moldova	Moldova	2–1	2–3	Friendly
7	6 September 2024	Darius and Girėnas Stadium, Kaunas, Lithuania	Lithuania	1–0	1–0	2024–25 UEFA Nations League C
8	18 November 2024	Arena Națională, Bucharest, Romania	Romania	1–2	1–4	2024–25 UEFA Nations League C
9	21 March 2025	AEK Arena – Georgios Karapatakis, Larnaca, Cyprus	San Marino	1–0	2–0	2026 FIFA World Cup qualification
10	24 March 2025	Bilino Polje, Zenica, Bosnia and Herzegovina	Bosnia and Herzegovina	1–1	1–2	2026 FIFA World Cup qualification
11	9 October 2025	AEK Arena – Georgios Karapatakis, Larnaca, Cyprus	Bosnia and Herzegovina	2–2	2–2	2026 FIFA World Cup qualification
12	15 November 2026	Alphamega Stadium, Limassol, Cyprus	Montenegro	1–1	1–4	2026–27 UEFA Nations League C

== Honours ==
Apollon Limassol

- Cypriot First Division: 2021–22
- Cypriot Cup: 2015–16, 2016–17
- Cypriot Super Cup: 2016, 2017, 2022

CSKA Sofia

- Bulgarian Cup: 2025–26
- Bulgarian Supercup: 2026

Individual

- Cypriot First Division top scorer: 2022–23
