= Ricardo Pessoa =

Portuguese former footballer (born 1982)

Personal information
- Full name: Ricardo Jorge Rodrigues Pessoa
- Date of birth: 5 February 1982 (age 44)
- Place of birth: Vendas Novas, Portugal
- Height: 1.80 m (5 ft 11 in)
- Position: Right-back

Youth career
- 1991–1994: Estrela Vendas Novas
- 1995–2001: Vitória Setúbal

Senior career*
Years	Team	Apps	(Gls)
2001–2005	Vitória Setúbal	30	(1)
2005–2018	Portimonense	377	(41)
2012–2013	→ Moreirense (loan)	23	(2)
Total		430	(44)

International career
2000–2001	Portugal U18	6	(0)
2003	Portugal U21	1	(0)
2004	Portugal B	1	(0)

Managerial career
- 2018–2022: Portimonense (assistant)
- 2022–2024: Lusitânia
- 2024–2025: Portimonense
- 2025: Lusitano Évora
- 2026: Amora
- * Club domestic league appearances and goals

Ricardo Jorge Rodrigues Pessoa (born 5 February 1982) is a Portuguese former professional footballer who played as a right-back, currently a manager.

He spent most of his 17-year career with Portimonense, but also competed in the Primeira Liga with Vitória de Setúbal and Moreirense. He made a record 359 appearances in the Segunda Liga.

== Club career ==
Born in Vendas Novas, Évora District, Pessoa started his professional career with Vitória de Setúbal, being sparingly used during his four-year spell with the Sado River club. He played 20 games as it returned to the Primeira Liga in 2004 after one year of absence, but only made ten appearances at that level over three seasons.

In the summer of 2005, Pessoa returned to the Segunda Liga and signed for Portimonense SC, being an undisputed starter from the beginnings and also eventually gaining captaincy. In the 2009–10 campaign, he scored six goals– whilst taking part in all 30 league matches – as the Algarve team returned to the top flight after 20 years.

Aged 35, Pessoa managed another promotion with his main club in 2017, contributing four goals (again mostly from penalties) from 29 appearances. On 25 May that year, he renewed his contract until 2020.

Pessoa retired at the end of the 2017–18 season, having featured sparingly as Portimonense retained their league status due to injury. During his 12-year spell in Portimão, he played 426 matches in all competitions.

== International career ==
Pessoa appeared once for Portugal at under-21 level, playing the last 14 minutes of the 2–2 friendly draw against Norway held in Guarda.

== Career statistics ==
Appearances and goals by club, season and competition
Club	Season	League			Cup		League Cup		Other		Total	
Club	Season	Division	Apps	Goals	Apps	Goals	Apps	Goals	Apps	Goals	Apps	Goals
Portimonense	2009–10	Segunda Liga	30	6	2	0	4	0	0	0	36	6
Portimonense	2010–11	Primeira Liga	29	3	2	0	1	0	0	0	32	3
Portimonense	2011–12	Segunda Liga	28	5	2	1	7	3	0	0	37	9
Portimonense	2013–14	Segunda Liga	41	8	0	0	5	3	0	0	46	11
Portimonense	2014–15	Segunda Liga	46	5	1	0	3	0	0	0	50	5
Portimonense	2015–16	Segunda Liga	46	8	2	0	4	0	0	0	52	8
Portimonense	2016–17	Segunda Liga	29	4	0	0	1	0	0	0	30	4
Portimonense	2017–18	Primeira Liga	9	0	1	0	1	1	0	0	11	1
Portimonense	Total		258	39	10	1	26	7	0	0	294	47
Moreirense (loan)	2012–13	Primeira Liga	23	2	2	0	3	0	0	0	28	2
Career total			281	41	12	1	29	7	0	0	322	49

== Honours ==
Vitória Setúbal

- Taça de Portugal: 2004–05

Portimonense

- Segunda Liga: 2016–17
