= Diogo Rodrigues (footballer, born 1999) =

Portuguese footballer (born 1999)

Personal information
- Full name: Diogo Miguel Costa Rodrigues
- Date of birth: 23 August 1999 (age 27)
- Place of birth: Vendas Novas, Portugal
- Height: 1.83 m (6 ft 0 in)
- Position: Right-back

Youth career
- 2007–2010: GDR Afeiteira
- 2010–2016: Belenenses
- 2016–2018: Sporting CP
- 2017–2018: → Sacavenense (loan)

Senior career*
Years	Team	Apps	(Gls)
2018–2019	Amora	6	(0)
2019–2022	Portimonense U23	76	(4)
2022–2023	Portimonense	1	(0)
2022–2023	→ Covilhã (loan)	21	(1)
2023–2024	UTA Arad	33	(1)
2025	Zimbru Chișinău	26	(4)
2026	Petrolul Ploiești	6	(0)
- * Club domestic league appearances and goals as of 18 May 2026

Diogo Miguel Costa Rodrigues (born 23 August 1999) is a Portuguese professional footballer who plays as a right-back.

== Career ==
=== Amora ===
After playing at junior level at CF Belenenses, Sporting CP, Diogo made his professional debut for Amora FC in the Campeonato de Portugal on 12 August 2018, in the match that the team won with a score of 4–0 against those from Redondense F.C. Of the six matches played that season, Diogo was the starter in four of them.

=== Portimonense ===
In the three seasons spent at Portimonense SC, Diogo played in only one match in the Primeira Liga, on 16 April 2022, when his team lost the away match against FC Porto, the champion of that season, with a score of 7–0. Diogo entered the field in the 80th minute replacing Henrique Jocú.

=== Covilhã ===
In the season in which he was loaned in Liga Portugal 2 to the SC Covilhã, he played in 22 matches and scored 1 goal in the away match lost at C.D. Mafra with the score of 3–2.

=== UTA Arad ===
On 26 July 2023, Diogo signed a two-year contract with the Romanian Liga 1 team, FC UTA Arad. He made his debut for his team in the match won 1–0 against Politehnica Iași on 4 August 2023. On 27 January 2024, he scored the first goal in Liga 1, in the match won at home against Sepsi OSK Sfântu Gheorghe with a score of 2–1.

=== Zimbru Chișinău ===
On 8 February 2025 he signed with Zimbru Chișinău after being a free agent since August.
