= Torbjørn Heggem =

Norwegian footballer (born 1999)

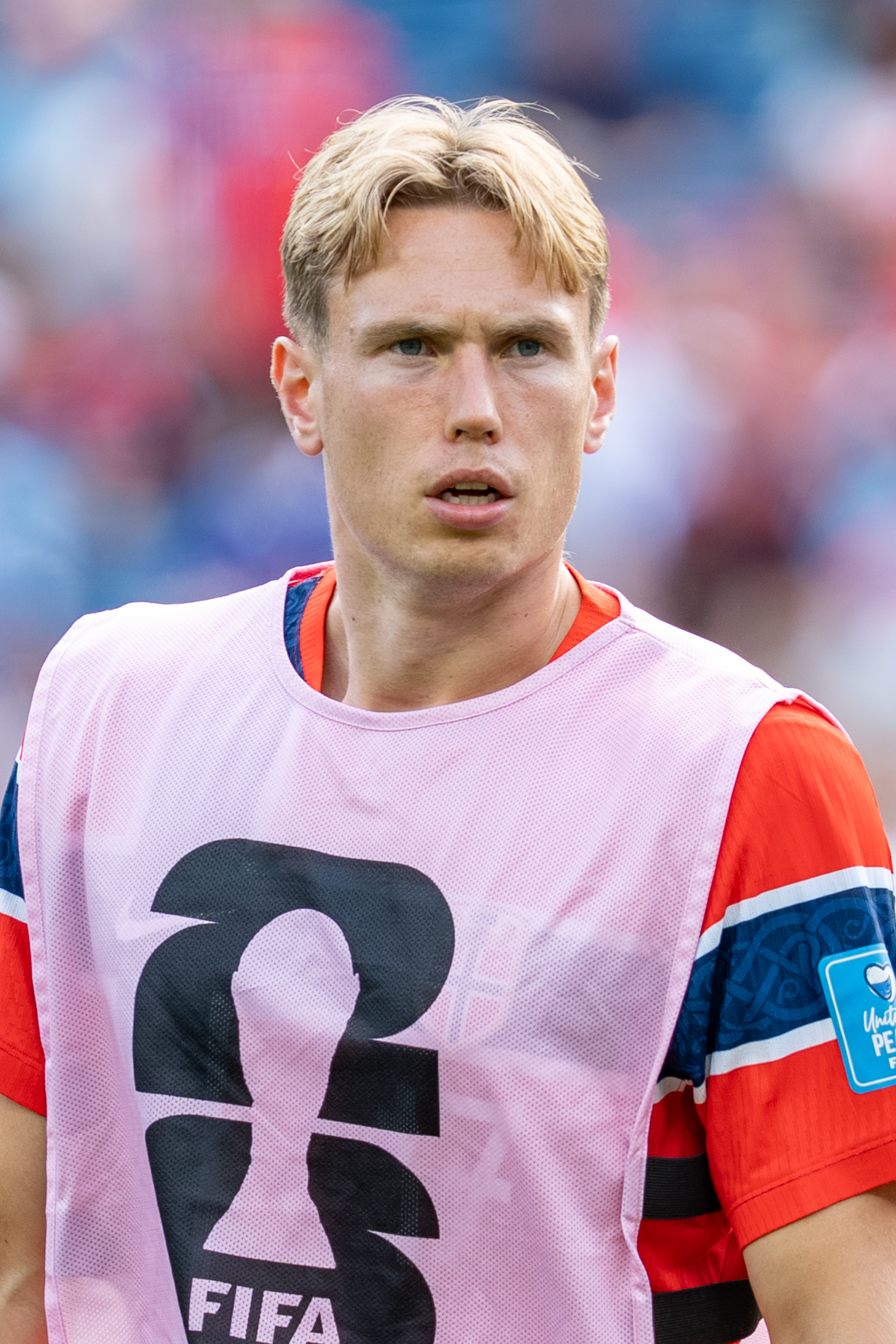
- Heggem with Norway in 2026

Personal information
- Full name: Torbjørn Lysaker Heggem
- Date of birth: 12 January 1999 (age 27)
- Place of birth: Trondheim, Norway
- Height: 1.92 m (6 ft 3 1/2 in)
- Position: Centre-back

Team information
- Current team: Bologna
- Number: 14

Youth career
- –2013: Astor
- 2014–2018: Rosenborg

Senior career*
Years	Team	Apps	(Gls)
2018–2021	Rosenborg	0	(0)
2019–2020	→ Ranheim (loan)	48	(1)
2021–2022	Sandnes Ulf	61	(1)
2023–2024	IF Brommapojkarna	40	(2)
2024–2025	West Bromwich Albion	46	(1)
2025–	Bologna	33	(0)

International career^{‡}
2024–	Norway	25	(0)
- * Club domestic league appearances and goals as of 28 October 2026 ‡ National team caps and goals as of 17 November 2026

Torbjørn Lysaker Heggem (born 12 January 1999) is a Norwegian footballer who plays as a defender for Serie A club Bologna and the Norway national team. Primarily a centre-back, Heggem can also play as a left-back.

== Club career ==
=== Early career ===
Torbjørn Lysaker Heggem joined Rosenborg in 2014 from Astor. He made his debut for Rosenborg coming on as a substitute against Lillestrøm in the 2018 Mesterfinalen. In January 2019, Heggem was sent out on loan to fellow Trondheim and Eliteserien club Ranheim. Later that year he made his debut in Eliteserien on 19 May, playing the full game which Ranheim won 3–1 away against Sarpsborg 08. In January 2021 he joined Sandnes Ulf.

On 22 December 2022, Heggem signed for Swedish side IF Brommapojkarna.

=== West Bromwich Albion ===
On 4 July 2024, Heggem signed for EFL Championship side West Bromwich Albion on a three-year contract. On 10 August 2024, he made his debut for the club in a 3–1 away win against QPR in the opening league game, and assisted Josh Maja's first goal in the first half. He scored his first goal for the club on 8 December 2024, scoring first in a 2–2 draw with Sheffield United. He won the 2024–25 West Bromwich Albion Player of the Season award for his performances during the campaign.

=== Bologna ===
On 15 August 2025, Heggem signed for Serie A club Bologna for an undisclosed fee, reported to be in the region of £10 million. He made his debut for the club on 30 August 2025, in a 1–0 win against Como.

== International career ==
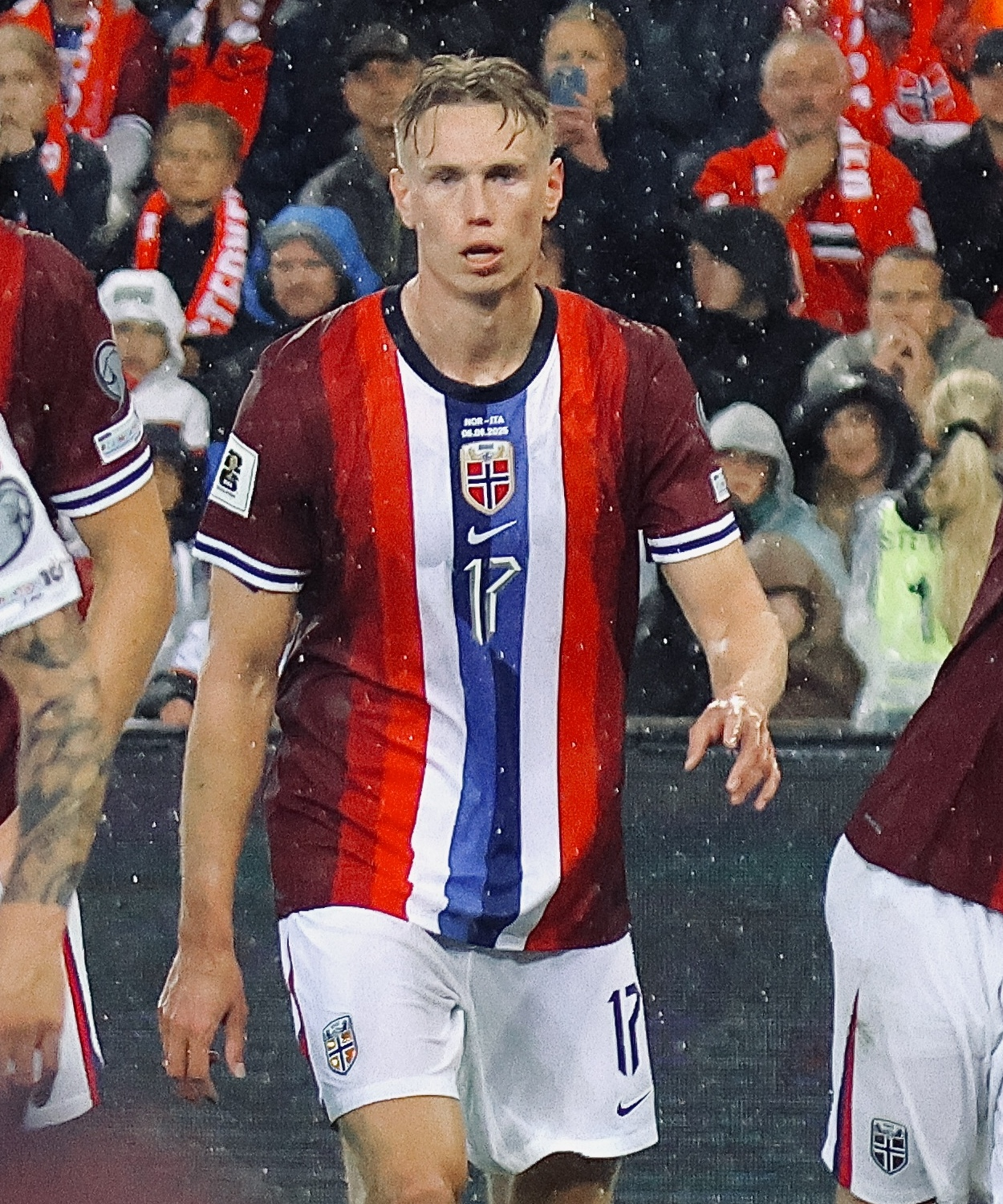
Heggem playing for Norway in 2025

Heggem received his first call-up to the Norway national team on 1 October 2024. He made his debut for the Norway national team on 13 October 2024 in a UEFA Nations League game against Austria at the Raiffeisen Arena. He substituted David Møller Wolfe in the 79th minute, as Austria won 5–1.

On 21 May 2026, Heggem was included in the 26-man squad selected by Norway national team manager Ståle Solbakken for the 2026 FIFA World Cup.

== Career statistics ==
=== Club ===
As of match played 28 October 2026

Appearances and goals by club, season and competition
Club	Season	League			National Cup (Note: Includes Norwegian Football Cup, Svenska Cupen, FA Cup, Coppa Italia)		Europe		Other		Total	
Club	Season	Division	Apps	Goals	Apps	Goals	Apps	Goals	Apps	Goals	Apps	Goals
Rosenborg	2018	Eliteserien	0	0	0	0	0	0	1 (Note: Appearance in the Mesterfinalen)	0	1	0
Ranheim (loan)	2019	Eliteserien	18	0	6	1	—		—		24	1
Ranheim (loan)	2020	1. divisjon	30	1	0	0	—		—		30	1
Ranheim (loan)	Total		48	1	6	1	—		—		54	2
Sandnes Ulf	2021	1. divisjon	30	0	3	0	—		—		33	0
Sandnes Ulf	2022	1. divisjon	31	1	1	0	—		—		32	1
Sandnes Ulf	Total		61	1	4	0	—		—		65	1
IF Brommapojkarna	2023	Allsvenskan	28	1	2	0	—		2 (Note: Appearances in the Allsvenskan play-offs)	0	32	1
IF Brommapojkarna	2024	Allsvenskan	12	1	4	0	—		—		16	1
IF Brommapojkarna	Total		40	2	6	0	—		2	0	48	2
West Bromwich Albion	2024–25	Championship	45	1	0	0	—		—		45	1
West Bromwich Albion	2025–26	Championship	1	0	—		—		—		1	0
West Bromwich Albion	Total		46	1	0	0	—		—		46	1
Bologna	2025–26	Serie A	26	0	2	0	8 (Note: Appearances in UEFA Europa League)	0	1 (Note: Appearance in Supercoppa Italiana)	0	37	0
Bologna	2026–27	Serie A	7	0	0	0	—		—		7	0
Bologna	Total		33	0	2	0	8	0	1	0	44	0
Career total			228	5	18	1	8	0	4	0	258	6

=== International ===
As of match played 17 November 2026

Appearances and goals by national team and year
National team	Year	Apps	Goals
Norway	2024	3	0
Norway	2025	8	0
Norway	2026	14	0
Total		25	0

== Honours ==
Rosenborg

- Mesterfinalen: 2018

Individual

- West Bromwich Albion Player of the Year: 2024–25
