= Omar Faraj =

Palestinian footballer (born 2002)

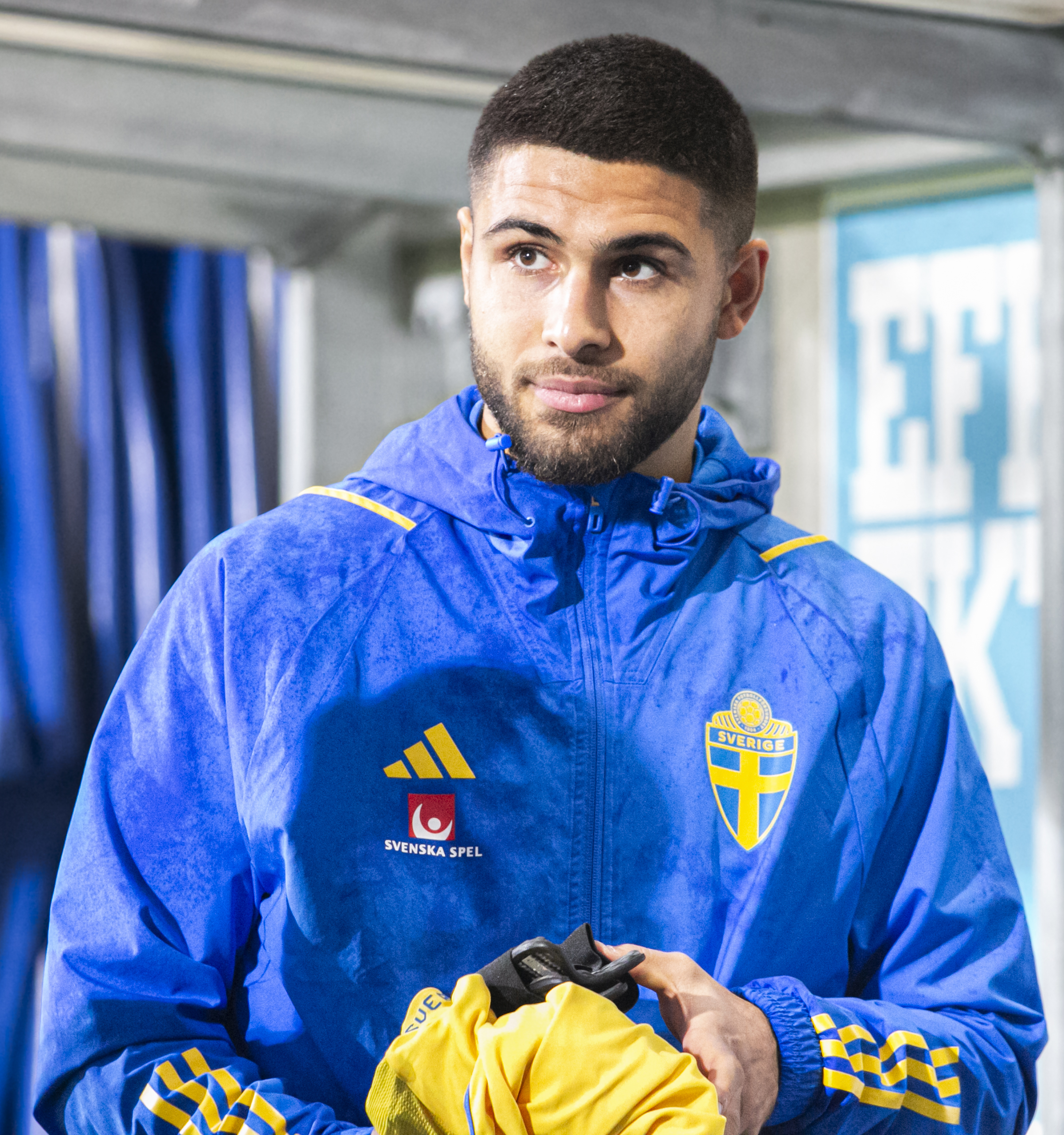
- Faraj in 2023

Personal information
- Date of birth: 9 March 2002 (age 24)
- Place of birth: Stockholm, Sweden
- Height: 1.75 m (5 ft 9 in)
- Position: Forward

Team information
- Current team: Halmstad
- Number: 9

Youth career
- –2013: Vasalund
- 2013–2016: AIK
- 2016–2019: Brommapojkarna

Senior career*
Years	Team	Apps	(Gls)
2020–2021	Brommapojkarna	36	(14)
2021–2022	Levante B	29	(7)
2022	Levante	1	(0)
2022	→ Degerfors (loan)	16	(4)
2023–2024	AIK	36	(4)
2024–2026	Zamalek	2	(0)
2025	→ Degerfors (loan)	13	(6)
2026–	Halmstad	11	(3)

International career
2022–2023	Sweden U21	5	(4)
2023	Sweden	2	(0)
2024–	Palestine	5	(0)
- * Club domestic league appearances and goals as of 9 July 2026

Omar Faraj (Arabic: عُمَر فَرَج; born 9 March 2002) is a professional footballer who plays as a forward for Allsvenskan club Halmstad. Born in Sweden, and a former Sweden international, he plays for the Palestine national team.

== Club career ==
=== Early career and Brommapojkarna ===
Faraj was born in Stockholm to Palestinian parents, and was an AIK and IF Brommapojkarna youth graduate. He made his first team debut on 14 June 2020, starting and being sent off in a 1–0 Ettan Norra away win over IK Frej.

Faraj scored his first senior goal on 28 June 2020, netting his team's second in a 3–3 home draw against Team TG FF. He finished his first senior season with five goals, and renewed his contract until 2023 on 18 March 2021.

Faraj scored a brace in a 4–1 home routing of IFK Haninge on 2 May 2021, and also netted a hat-trick in a 6–0 thrashing of Täby FK late in the month.

=== Levante ===
On 6 August 2021, Faraj moved abroad and signed a five-year contract with La Liga side Levante UD, being initially assigned to the reserves in Segunda División RFEF. He was the B-side's top goalscorer during the season with seven goals, as the team was unable to avoid relegation.

Faraj made his first team – and La Liga – debut on 20 May 2022, coming on as a late substitute for Alejandro Cantero in a 4–2 away success over Rayo Vallecano, as the Granotes were already relegated.

On 21 July 2022, Faraj was loaned to Degerfors IF back in his home country, until December.

=== AIK ===
On 26 October 2022, it was officially announced that Faraj would join his boyhood club AIK on a permanent deal in January 2023, signing a three-year contract in the process.

=== Zamalek ===
In September 2024, Faraj joined Egyptian side Zamalek by signing a contract until June 2027.

On 12 January 2025, Faraj returned to Degerfors IF on loan until 31 July 2025. The club was freshly promoted to the Swedish top tier Allsvenskan. On 30 March 2025, Faraj played against Halmstads BK, scoring all 5 goals for Degersfors IF in a 0–5 win at the Örjans Vall stadium.

== International career ==
=== Sweden ===
Faraj made his full international debut for Sweden on 9 January 2023, replacing Hugo Larsson 68 minutes into a friendly 2–0 win against Finland.

=== Palestine ===
Born to parents of Palestinian descent, Faraj was eligible to represent Palestine as he was below 23 and had less than 3 caps for Sweden, allowing him to switch national teams. On 2 June 2024, he received his first call up to the Palestine national team for the World Cup qualification games against Lebanon and Australia.

== Career statistics ==
=== Club ===
As of match played 30 March 2025

Appearances and goals by club, season and competition
Club	Season	League			National cup (Note: Includes Svenska Cupen)		Continental		Other		Total	
Club	Season	Division	Apps	Goals	Apps	Goals	Apps	Goals	Apps	Goals	Apps	Goals
Brommapojkarna	2019	Ettan	—		3	0	—		—		3	0
Brommapojkarna	2020	Ettan	23	5	2	1	—		2 (Note: Appearances in Superettan promotion play-offs)	0	27	6
Brommapojkarna	2021	Ettan	13	9	1	2	—		—		14	11
Brommapojkarna	Total		36	14	6	3	—		2	0	44	17
Levante II	2021–22	Segunda División RFEF	29	7	—		—		—		29	7
Levante	2021–22	La Liga	1	0	0	0	—		—		1	0
Degerfors (loan)	2022	Allsvenskan	16	4	0	0	—		—		16	4
AIK	2022	Allsvenskan	—		4	1	—		—		4	1
AIK	2023	Allsvenskan	24	3	6	2	—		—		30	5
AIK	2024	Allsvenskan	13	1	1	2	—		—		14	3
AIK	Total		37	4	11	5	—		—		48	9
Zamalek	2024–25	Egyptian Premier League	2	0	0	0	2 (Note: Appearances in CAF Confederation Cup)	1	1 (Note: Appearance in CAF Super Cup)	0	5	1
Degerfors (loan)	2025	Allsvenskan	10	6	3	2	—		—		13	8
Career total			131	35	20	10	2	1	3	0	156	46

=== International ===
Appearances and goals by national team and year
National team	Year	Apps	Goals
Sweden	2023	2	0
Palestine	2024	3	0
Total		5	0

== Honours ==
Zamalek

- CAF Super Cup: 2024
