= Ismael Diawara =

Malian footballer (born 1994)

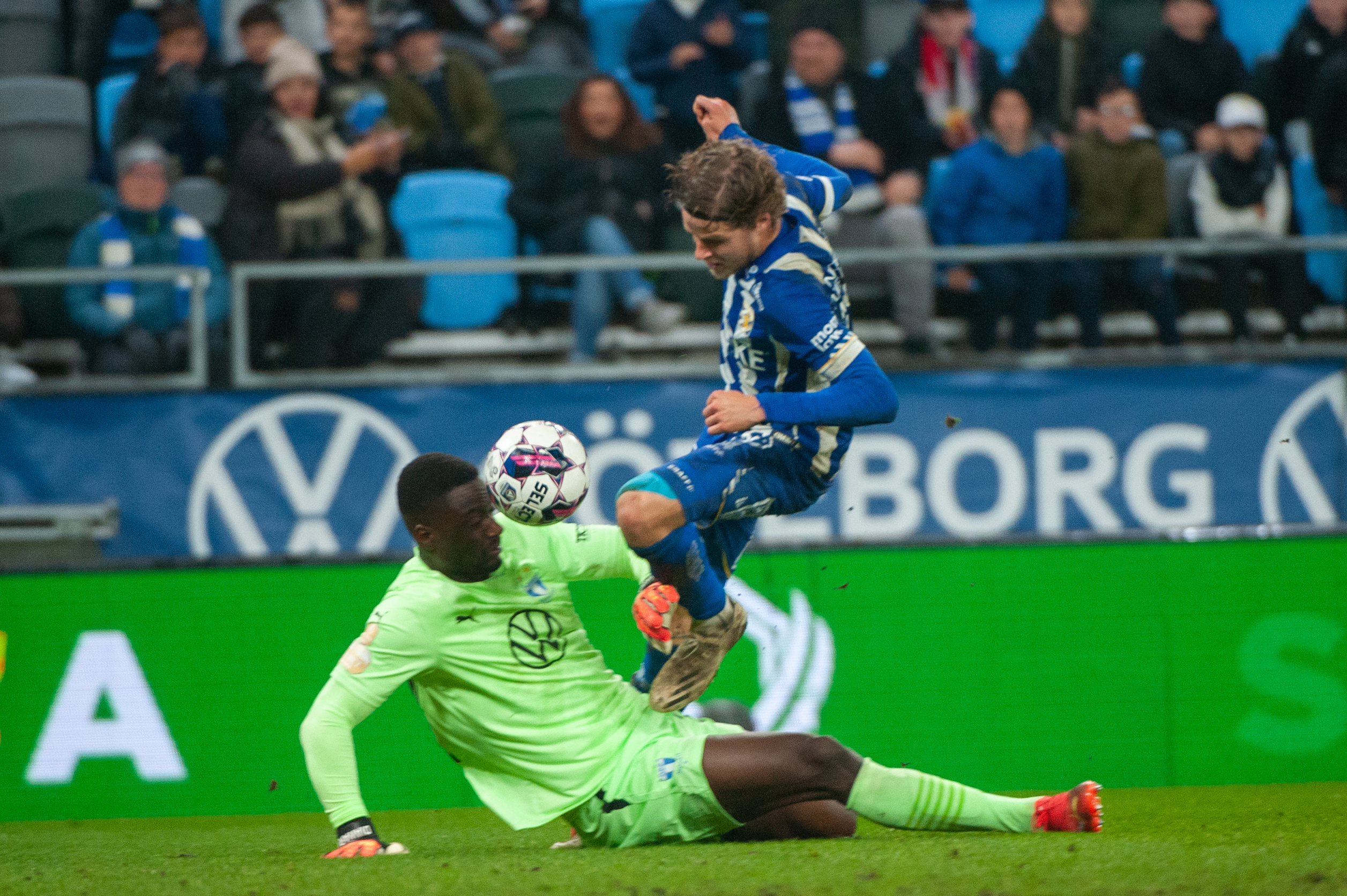
- Diawara playing for Malmö FF in 2022

Personal information
- Full name: Ismael Diarra Diawara
- Date of birth: 11 November 1994 (age 32)
- Place of birth: Örebro, Sweden
- Height: 1.94 m (6 ft 4 in)
- Position: Goalkeeper

Team information
- Current team: Sirius
- Number: 1

Youth career
- Rynninge IK

Senior career*
Years	Team	Apps	(Gls)
2011–2013	Rynninge IK	32	(0)
2014	BK Forward	25	(0)
2015	FK Gjøvik-Lyn	24	(0)
2016	Landskrona BoIS	10	(0)
2017	Motala AIF	26	(0)
2018–2021	Degerfors IF	64	(0)
2021–2023	Malmö FF	18	(0)
2023–2024	AIK	3	(0)
2025–	IK Sirius	15	(0)

International career^{‡}
2021–	Mali	10	(0)
- * Club domestic league appearances and goals as of 8 August 2025 ‡ National team caps and goals as of 22:15, 20 November 2023 (UTC)

Ismael Diarra Diawara (born 11 November 1994) is a professional footballer who plays as a goalkeeper for Allsvenskan club Sirius. Born in Sweden, he plays for the Mali national team.

== Club career ==
On 11 August 2021 Diawara joined reigning Swedish champions Malmö FF after leaving Degerfors IF to serve as backup to Johan Dahlin. He made his debut two weeks later following a Dahlin injury in the Champions League playoff return leg against Bulgarian champions Ludogorets Razgrad. After only conceding a goal on a penalty kick, Diawara and Malmö FF held on to their aggregate lead to advance to the group stage of the tournament.

Following an unsuccessful stay in AIK, he moved on to IK Sirius. Here, he instantly became the starting goalkeeper, including in a victory over AIK.

== International career ==
Born in Sweden, Diawara is Malian by descent. He was called up to represent the Mali national team for 2022 FIFA World Cup qualification matches in September 2021. He debuted with Mali in a 1–0 2022 FIFA World Cup qualification win over Uganda on 14 November 2021.

On 11 December 2025, Diawara was called up to the Mali squad for the 2025 Africa Cup of Nations.

== Career statistics ==
=== Club ===
As of match played 20 August 2025

Appearances and goals by club, season and competition
Club	Season	League			Cup		Europe		Other		Total	
Club	Season	Division	Apps	Goals	Apps	Goals	Apps	Goals	Apps	Goals	Apps	Goals
BK Forward	2014	Ettan	25	0	0	0	—		—		25	0
Gjøvik-Lyn	2015	Norwegian Second Division	24	0	3	0	—		—		3	0
Landskrona BoIS	2016	Ettan	10	0	0	0	—		—		10	0
Degerfors	2018	Superettan	2	0	1	0	—		—		3	0
Degerfors	2019	Superettan	30	0	0	0	—		—		30	0
Degerfors	2020	Superettan	21	0	0	0	—		—		21	0
Degerfors	2021	Allsvenskan	13	0	2	0	—		—		15	0
Degerfors	Total		66	0	3	0	—		—		69	0
Malmö	2021	Allsvenskan	3	0	0	0	4 (Note: Appearances in UEFA Champions League)	0	0	0	7	0
Malmö	2022	Allsvenskan	14	0	2	0	5 (Note: Appearances in UEFA Europa League)	0	0	0	21	0
Malmö	2023	Allsvenskan	1	0	3	0	—		—		4	0
Malmö	Total		18	0	5	0	9	0	0	0	32	0
AIK	2023	Allsvenskan	0	0	1	0	—		—		1	0
AIK	2024	Allsvenskan	3	0	2	0	—		—		5	0
AIK	Total		3	0	3	0	—		—		6	0
IK Sirius	2025	Allsvenskan	15	0	4	0	—		—		19	0
Career total			137	0	18	0	9	0	0	0	164	0

=== International ===
As of match played 20 November 2023

Appearances and goals by national team and year
National team	Year	Apps	Goals
Mali	2021	1	0
Mali	2022	4	0
Mali	2023	5	0
Total		10	0

== Honours ==
Malmö FF

- Allsvenskan: 2021, 2023
- Svenska Cupen: 2021–22
