= Nikola Vasić (footballer) =

Swedish footballer (born 1991)

Personal information
- Full name: Nikola Karađorđe Vasić
- Date of birth: 4 October 1991 (age 35)
- Place of birth: Sweden
- Height: 1.96 m (6 ft 5 in)
- Position: Forward

Team information
- Current team: Hammarby IF
- Number: 19

Senior career*
Years	Team	Apps	(Gls)
2011–2012	Bagarmossen Kärrtorp BK	31	(17)
2013–2015	Enskede IK	36	(6)
2016	Huddinge IF	24	(22)
2017–2020	Akropolis IF	67	(44)
2020–2022	Reggina	8	(0)
2021	→ Vasalund IF (loan)	26	(8)
2022–2025	Brommapojkarna	84	(32)
2025-	Hammarby IF	9	(3)
- * Club domestic league appearances and goals as of 10 June 2026

Nikola Karađorđe Vasić (Serbian Cyrillic: Никола Карађорђе Васић; born 4 October 1991) is a Swedish footballer who plays for GAIS.

== Career ==
Vasić started his career with Bagarmossen Kärrtorp BK in the Swedish fifth division as a midfielder, before converting to a striker and scoring 17 goals.

While playing for Huddinge IF in the fourth division, he temporarily gained nationwide fame after scoring a bicycle kick two games in a row.

In 2017, Vasić signed for Akropolis IF in the third division.

On 2 October 2020, he signed a three-year contract with Italian club Reggina. On 25 March 2021, he was loaned to Vasalund IF. The loan has been extended on 15 July 2021.

On 25 January 2022, he left the Calabrese club. On 26 January, he signed a 2-years contract for Brommapojkarna.

Vasić was the top scorer of the 2024 Allsvenskan season, netting 17 goals in 29 matches. By achieving this feat, he became the first player from Brommapojkarna to win the Allsvenskan Golden Boot.

== Honours ==
Individual

- Allsvenskan top scorer: 2024
- Allsvenskan Forward of the Year: 2024
