= Kevin Ackermann =

Swedish professional footballer

Personal information
- Full name: Kevin Robert Ackermann
- Date of birth: 24 May 2001 (age 25)
- Place of birth: Gothenburg, Sweden
- Height: 1.77 m (5 ft 10 in)
- Position: Midfielder

Team information
- Current team: IFK Göteborg
- Number: 4

Youth career
- 2006–2007: Azalea BK
- 2007–2014: IFK Göteborg
- 2014–2016: IF Angered United
- 2017: BK Häcken

Senior career*
Years	Team	Apps	(Gls)
2016	IF Angered United	17	(1)
2017–2019	BK Häcken	2	(0)
2020–2022	Örgryte IS	62	(5)
2023–2026	IF Brommapojkarna	60	(3)
2026–	IFK Göteborg	3	(0)

International career^{‡}
2016–2018	Sweden U17	20	(2)
2018	Sweden U19	2	(0)
2024	Sweden	1	(0)
- * Club domestic league appearances and goals as of 18:56, 19 September 2026 (UTC) ‡ National team caps and goals as of 23:46, 12 January 2024 (UTC)

Kevin Robert Ackermann (born 24 May 2001) is a Swedish professional footballer who plays as a midfielder for IFK Göteborg.

== Club career ==
Ackermann started playing football as a five-year-old in Azalea BK. Ackermann then went to IFK Göteborg, where he spent seven years.

On 14 August 2017, 16-year old Ackermann made his debut with the senior team in Allsvenskan in a 2–0 home against GIF Sundsvall, coming on as a 92nd-minute substitute for Chisom Egbuchulam.

In November 2018, Häcken accepted a bid for Ackermann from the Italian ACF Fiorentina. However, during the medical examination it was discovered that Ackermann had a heart defect, which stopped the transfer. He underwent an operation to fix the heart defect in Belgium on 30 April 2019. In August 2019, Ackermann returned to Häcken and was able to start training with the team again. He did not play any competition matches during the 2019 season, but in November 2019 he was selected for the first time in a year in the squad for a training match against Ljungskile SK. After the 2019 season, Ackermann and Häcken agreed to terminate his contract early.

On 3 January 2020, Ackermann was acquired by Örgryte IS, where he signed a three-year contract.

== International career ==
Ackermann made his full international debut for the Sweden national team on 12 January 2024 in a friendly game against Estonia which Sweden won 2–1.

== Career statistics ==
=== Club ===
As of 1 June 2022

Appearances and goals by club, season and competition
Club	Season	League			Svenska Cupen		Continental		Other		Total	
Club	Season	Division	Apps	Goals	Apps	Goals	Apps	Goals	Apps	Goals	Apps	Goals
IF Angered United	2016	Division 3 Nordvästra Götaland	17	1	0	0	—		—		17	1
BK Häcken	2017	Allsvenskan	1	0	1	0	0	0	—		2	0
BK Häcken	2018	Allsvenskan	1	0	0	0	0	0	—		1	0
BK Häcken	Total		2	0	1	0	0	0	0	0	3	0
Örgryte IS	2020	Superettan	24	3	2	0	—		—		26	3
Örgryte IS	2021	Superettan	11	0	3	0	—		—		14	0
Örgryte IS	2022	Superettan	9	1	0	0	—		0	0	9	1
Örgryte IS	Total		44	4	5	0	0	0	0	0	49	5
Career total			63	5	6	0	0	0	0	0	69	5
