= Thomas Isherwood =

Swedish footballer

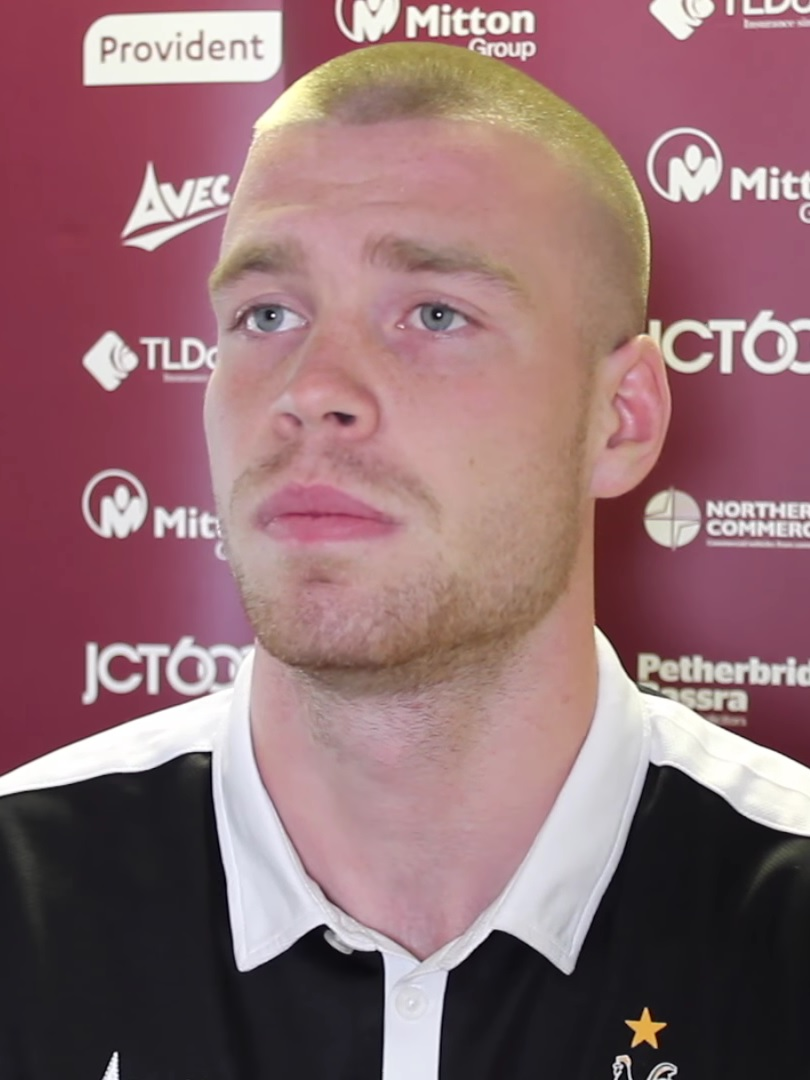
- Isherwood in 2018

Personal information
- Full name: Thomas Mattias Poppler Isherwood
- Date of birth: 28 January 1998 (age 28)
- Height: 1.95 m (6 ft 5 in)
- Position: Central defender

Team information
- Current team: Elfsborg
- Number: 4

Youth career
- Fruängens IF

Senior career*
Years	Team	Apps	(Gls)
2014	Brommapojkarna	0	(0)
2015–2017	Bayern Munich	0	(0)
2017–2018	Bayern Munich II	18	(0)
2018–2019	Bradford City	3	(0)
2019–2020	Östersund	44	(4)
2021–2024	Darmstadt 98	52	(0)
2024–2026	AIK	31	(2)
2026-	Elfsborg	12	(0)

International career^{‡}
2013–2015	Sweden U17	18	(2)
2015–2017	Sweden U19	16	(2)
2019–2020	Sweden U21	7	(0)
- * Club domestic league appearances and goals as of 8 July 2026 ‡ National team caps and goals as of 13 October 2020

Thomas Mattias Poppler Isherwood (born 28 January 1998) is a Swedish professional footballer who plays as a centre-back for Elfsborg.

Isherwood has played in Sweden, Germany and England for Brommapojkarna, Bayern Munich, Bradford City and Östersund. He is also a former Sweden youth international.

== Early and personal life ==
Isherwood's father is English and his mother is Swedish.

== Club career ==
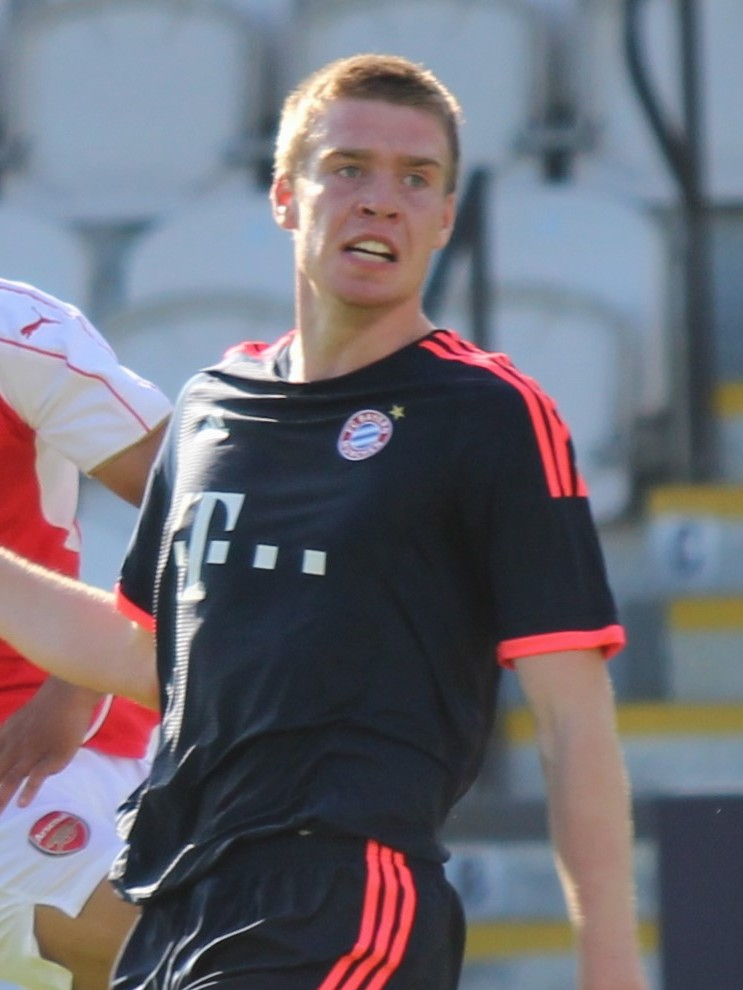
Isherwood playing for Bayern Munich U19 in October 2015

Isherwood began his youth career with Fruängens IF, and his senior career with Brommapojkarna, making one appearance in the Swedish Cup in 2014. He moved to Germany to play for Bayern Munich in July 2015, and made senior appearances in the Regionalliga with Bayern's second team.

In 2015 he was linked with English club Manchester City. In April 2018 he was linked with a transfer to Scottish club Celtic, and he also trialled with Scottish club Rangers at the end of the 2017–18 season.

In June 2018, he signed a two-year contract with English club Bradford City. He said the club's youth player development appealed to him. In January 2019 he was linked with a transfer away from the club, back to Sweden. He later left the club by mutual consent. Later that month he signed for Swedish club Östersund.

In January 2021, he signed for 2. Bundesliga side Darmstadt 98 for an undisclosed fee on a contract until 2024. On 12 May 2024, the club announced that Isherwood would be one of several players who would leave the club at the end of the 2023–24 season.

On 26 August 2024, Isherwood signed a contract with AIK until 30 June 2025. On 6 November 2025, AIK announced that Isherwood would leave the club when his contract ends on 31 December 2025.

On 6 January 2026, Isherwood signed a three-year contract with Elfsborg.

== International career ==
Isherwood represented Sweden at youth international levels from under-17 to under-21. He is also eligible to represent England.

== Career statistics ==
As of match played 18 May 2024

Appearances and goals by club, season and competition
Club	Season	League			Cup		Total	
Club	Season	Division	Apps	Goals	Apps	Goals	Apps	Goals
Bayern Munich II	2017–18	Regionalliga Bayern	18	0	—		18	0
Bradford City	2018–19	League One	3	0	0	0	3	0
Östersunds FK	2019	Allsvenskan	18	2	1	0	19	2
Östersunds FK	2020	Allsvenskan	26	2	3	0	29	2
Östersunds FK	Total		44	4	4	0	48	4
SV Darmstadt 98	2020–21	2. Bundesliga	1	0	0	0	1	0
SV Darmstadt 98	2021–22	2. Bundesliga	24	0	1	0	25	0
SV Darmstadt 98	2022–23	2. Bundesliga	15	0	1	0	16	0
SV Darmstadt 98	2023–24	Bundesliga	12	0	0	0	12	0
SV Darmstadt 98	Total		52	0	2	0	54	0
Career Total			117	4	6	0	123	4
