= Vendas Novas =

City of Vendas Novas
- Municipality
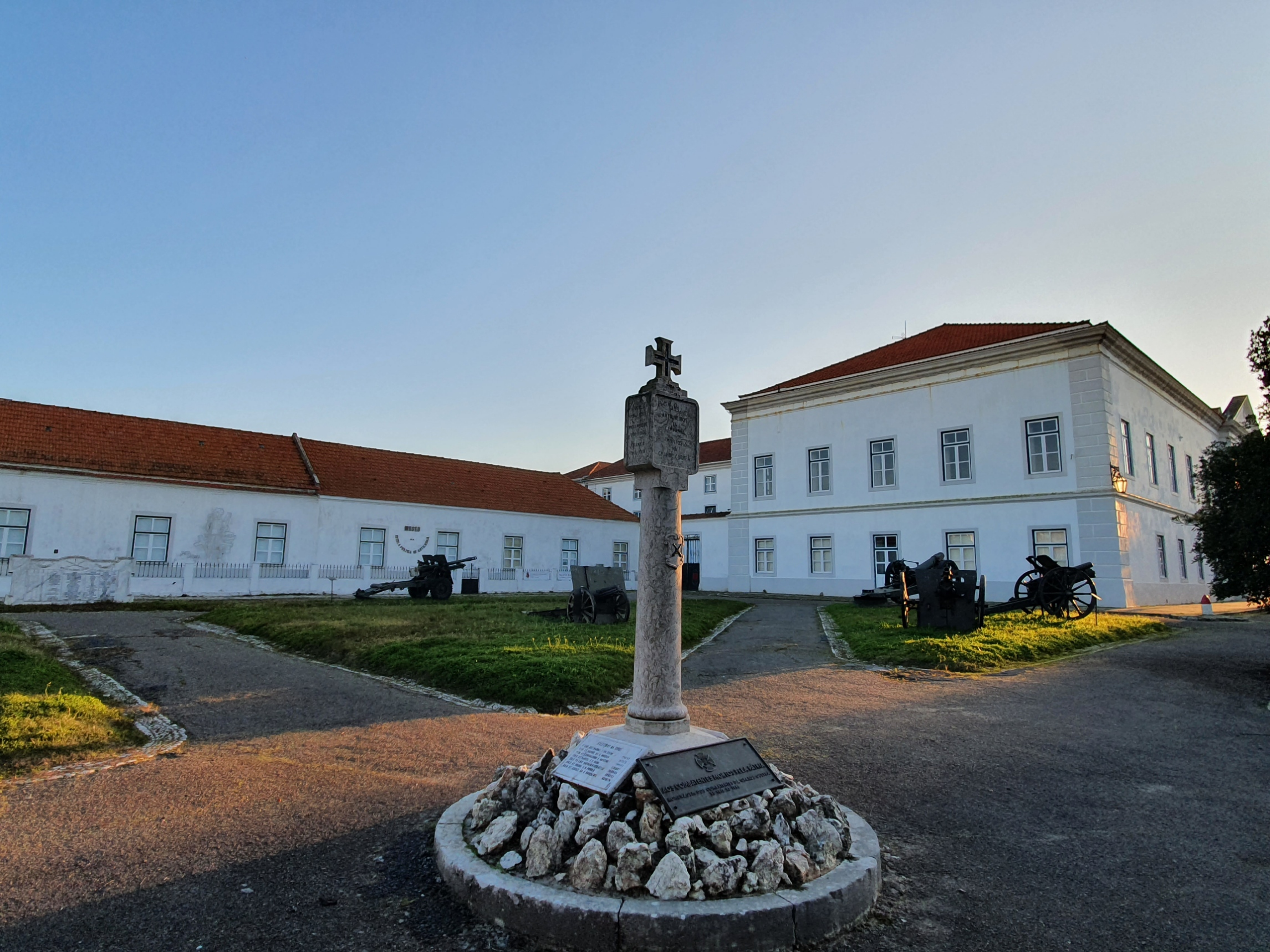

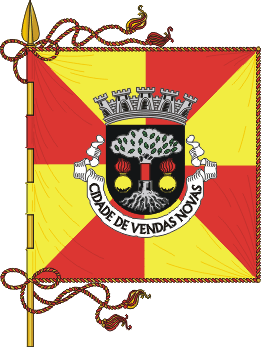
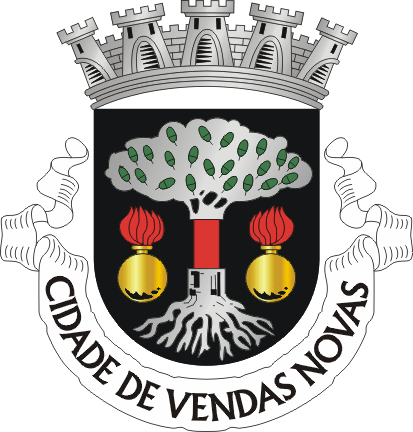
- Flag Coat of arms
- Interactive map of Vendas Novas
- Coordinates: 38°41′N 8°27′W
- Country: Portugal
- Region: Alentejo
- Intermunic. comm.: Alentejo Central
- District: Évora
- Parishes: 2

Government
  - President: Valentino Salgado Cunha (PS)

Area
  - Total: 222.39 km^{2} (85.87 sq mi)

Population (2021)
  - Total: 11,245
  - Density: 50.564/km^{2} (130.96/sq mi)
- Time zone: UTC+00:00 (WET)
  - Summer (DST): UTC+01:00 (WEST)
- Local holiday: September 7
- Website: www.cm-vn.pt

Vendas Novas (Portuguese pronunciation: [ˈvẽdɐʒ ˈnɔvɐʃ]), officially the City of Vendas Novas (Portuguese: Cidade de Vendas Novas), is a municipality in the District of Évora in Portugal. The population in 2021 was 11,245, in an area of 222.39 km^{2}. The city has 10,625 inhabitants.

The present Mayor is Valentino Salgado Cunha, elected by the Socialist Party. The municipal holiday is September 7.

== History ==
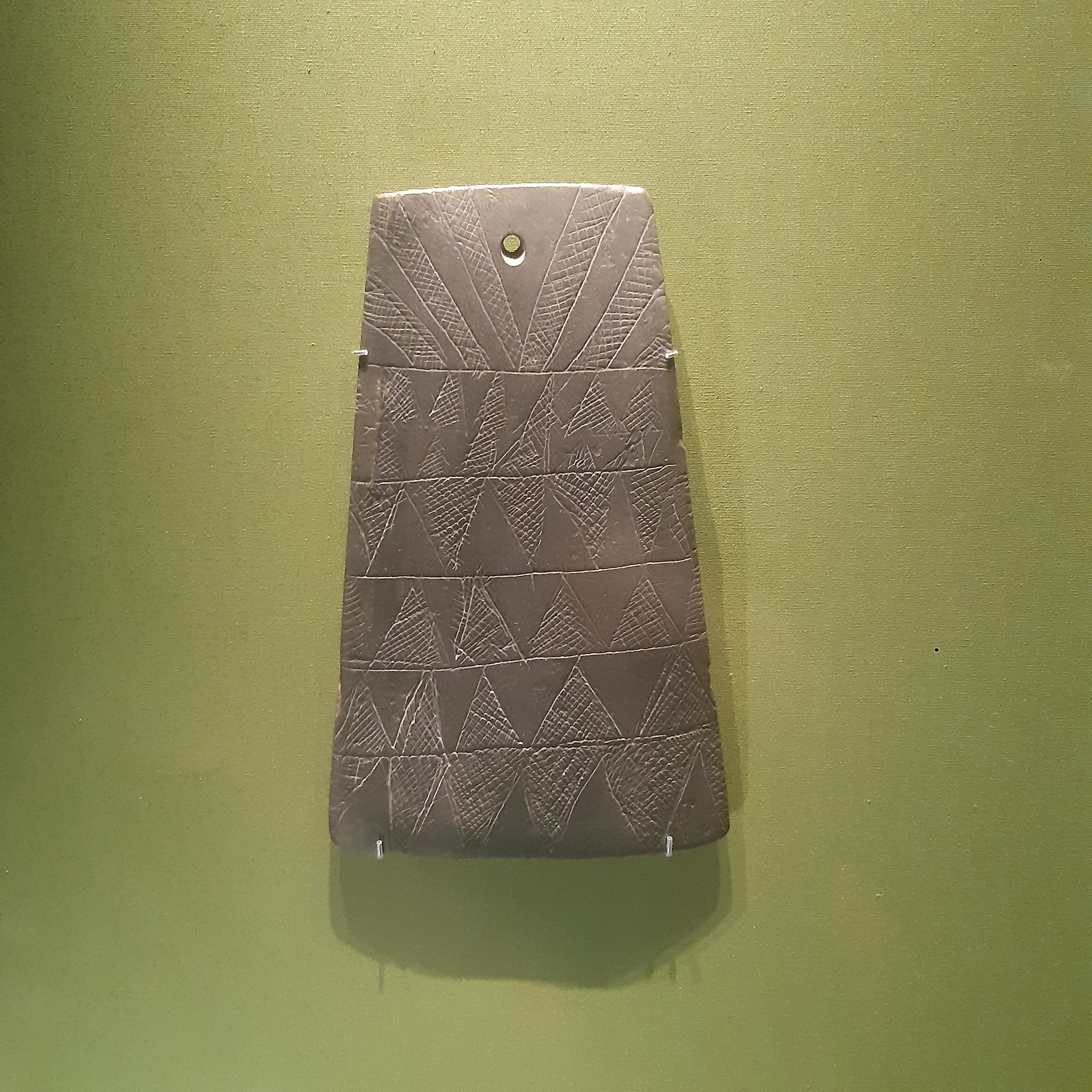
One of the Vendas Novas plaques in the British Museum

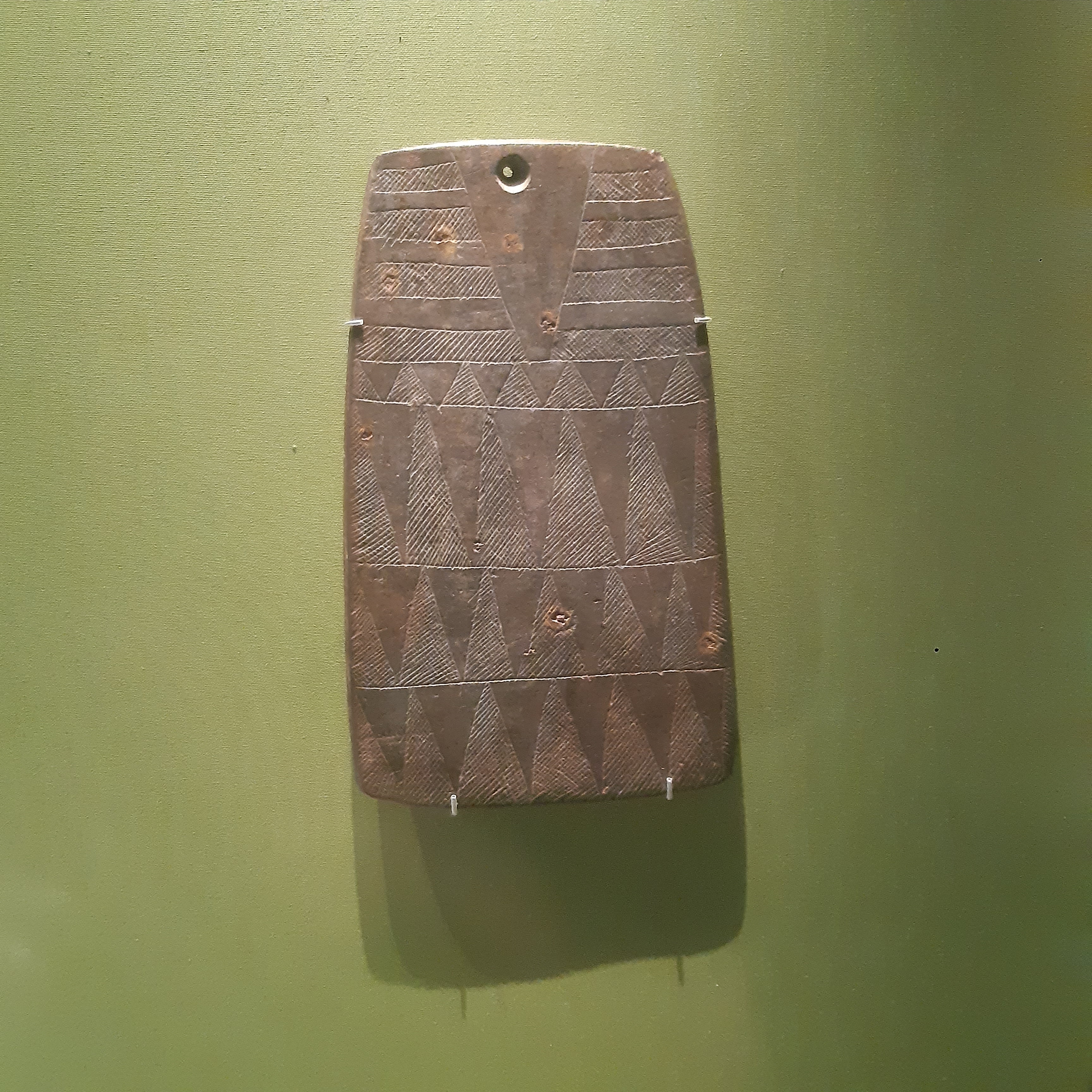
The other Vendas Novas plaque in the British Museum

A hoard of prehistoric objects, including two trapezoid-shaped plaques with geometric designs, was found underneath a hill by labourers in the mid nineteenth century during the construction of the railway line between Vendas Novas and Beja. They are since 1862 kept at the British Museum.

== Parishes ==
Administratively, the municipality is divided into 2 civil parishes (freguesias):

- Landeira
- Vendas Novas

== Notable people ==
- Pedro Madeira (born 1992 in Vendas Novas) a singer.
- Rui Modesto (born 1999) a footballer.
- Pedro Pereira (born 1998) a footballer.
- Ricardo Pessoa (born 1982) a former professional footballer with 430 club caps.
- Diogo Rodrigues (born 1999) a footballer.
