= Estrela de Vendas Novas =

Portuguese association football club

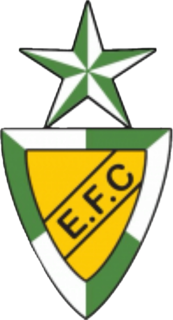
- Full name: Estrela Futebol Clube de Vendas Novas
- Founded: 1920
- Ground: Estádio Municipal Vendas Novas, Vendas Novas
- Capacity: 612
- Chairman: Valentino Salgado Cunha
- Manager: António Calção
- League: Évora Elite League

Estrela Futebol Clube de Vendas Novas commonly known as simply as Estrela de Vendas Novas is a Portuguese sports club from the city of Vendas Novas, Évora. The club was founded in 1920. It currently plays at the Estádio Municipal de Vendas Novas which holds a capacity of 612. The stadium also plays host to the club's reserve and youth team home games. The team is now competing in the Évora Elite League after finishing third in the 2021–22 campaign.

== Honours ==
- Terceira Divisão
  - Winners (2): 2005–06, 2010–11
- AF Évora Honour league
  - Winners (1): 2009–10
