= Kevin Filling =

Swedish footballer (born 2008

Personal information
- Full name: Kevin Boubacar Filling
- Date of birth: 30 November 2008 (age 17)
- Place of birth: Sweden
- Height: 1.74 m (5 ft 9 in)
- Position: Forward

Team information
- Current team: AIK Fotboll
- Number: 29

Youth career
- –2019: IK Franke
- 2020–2022: Västerås SK
- 2023–2024: AIK

Senior career*
Years	Team	Apps	(Gls)
2025–	AIK	18	(3)
2025	→ Enköpings SK FK (loan)	3	(1)

International career^{‡}
2023–2025	Sweden U17	14	(2)
2025–	Sweden U19	11	(4)
- * Club domestic league appearances and goals as of 22:16, 8 June 2026 (UTC) ‡ National team caps and goals as of 8 June 2025

Kevin Boubacar Filling (born 30 November 2008) is a Swedish professional footballer who plays as a forward for AIK Fotboll.

== Club career ==
As a youth player, Filling joined the youth academy of IK Franke. In 2019, he joined the youth academy of Västerås SK Fotboll. Ahead of the 2023 season, he joined the youth academy of AIK Fotboll and was promoted to the club's senior team in 2025. On 29 June 2025, he debuted and scored his first goal for them during a 3–0 home win over IFK Göteborg in the league.

Earlier the same year, he was sent on loan to Enköpings SK FK, where he made three league appearances and scored one goal. On 24 May 2025, he debuted for the club during a 1–3 away loss to FC Stockholm in the league. On 28 May 2025, he scored his first goal for them during a 5–1 home win over IFK Stocksund in the league.

== Personal life ==
Filling is of Senegalese descent.
