= Rasmus Örqvist =

Swedish footballer

Personal information
- Full name: Dennis Anders Rasmus Örqvist
- Date of birth: 18 October 1998 (age 28)
- Height: 1.84 m (6 ft 0 in)
- Position: Midfielder

Team information
- Current team: IF Brommapojkarna
- Number: 11

Youth career
- Våmbs IF

Senior career*
Years	Team	Apps	(Gls)
2014–2019	Skövde AIK	118	(28)
2020–2021	Norrby IF	53	(8)
2022–2023	Degerfors IF	53	(7)
2024–	IF Brommapojkarna	33	(1)
- * Club domestic league appearances and goals as of 8 July 2026

Rasmus Örqvist (born 18 October 1998) is a Swedish footballer who plays as a midfielder for IF Brommapojkarna in Allsvenskan.

He hails from Skövde Municipality, and played several years for Skövde AIK before making the move to Norrby IF. After the 2021 season, he was brought to Degerfors IF together with teammate Dijan Vukojevic.

Örqvist made his Allsvenskan debut on 4 April 2022 against Djurgården. He became remembered for scoring a 2–2 goal against Malmö in the 2022 Allsvenskan closing game, which secured Degerfors' place in the 2023 Allsvenskan, avoiding a playoff and possible relegation.
