= Rui Modesto =

Angolan footballer

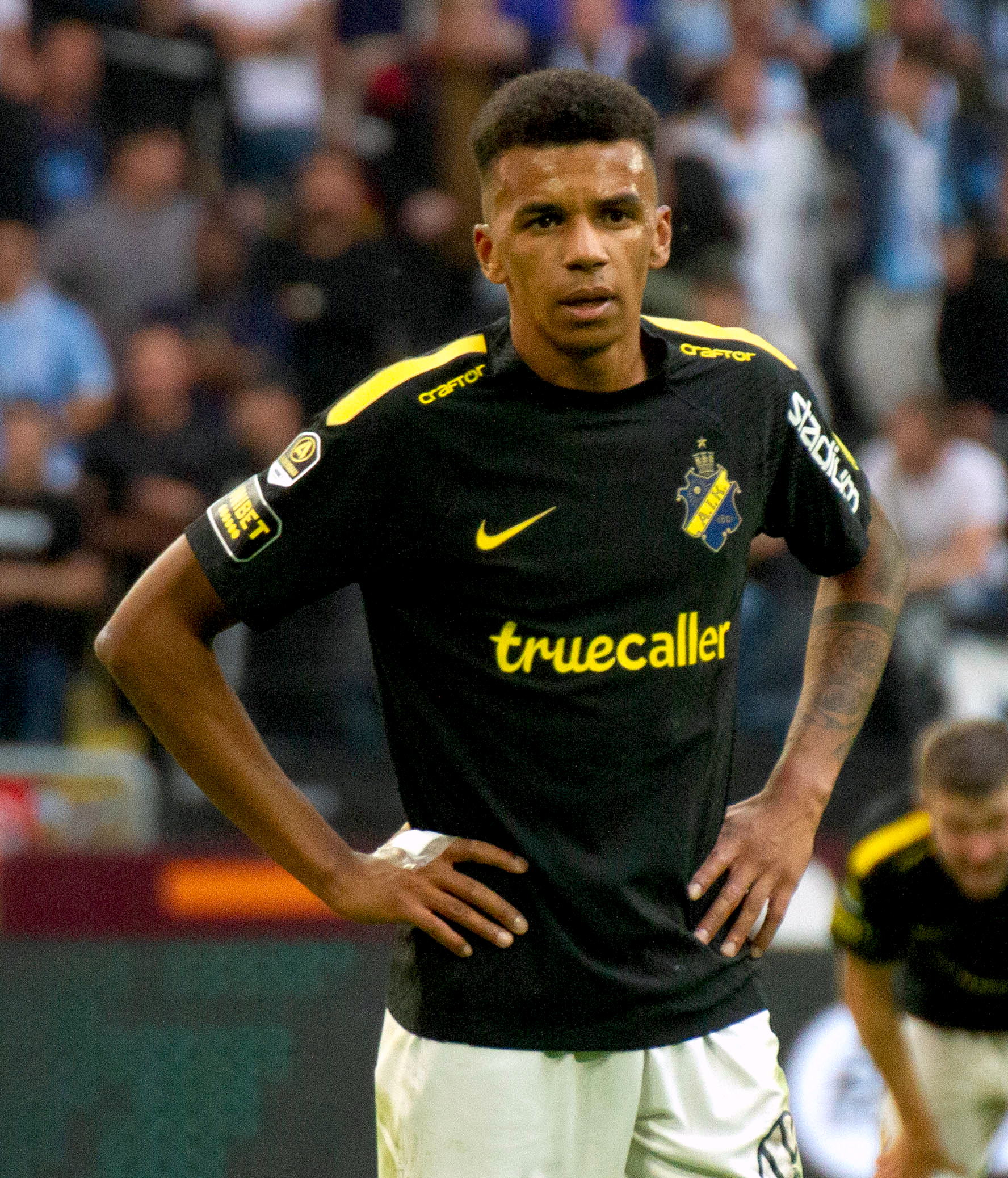
- Modesto with AIK in 2023

Personal information
- Full name: Rui Manuel Muati Modesto
- Date of birth: 7 October 1999 (age 27)
- Place of birth: Vendas Novas, Portugal
- Height: 1.83 m (6 ft 0 in)
- Positions: Winger; wing-back; full back

Team information
- Current team: Vancouver Whitecaps
- Number: 70

Youth career
- 2007–2012: Afeiteira
- 2012–2018: Estrela V.N.
- 2015–2016: → Juventude Évora (youth loan)
- 2016–2017: → Lusitano Évora (youth loan)
- 2018–2020: Vitória Setubal

Senior career*
Years	Team	Apps	(Gls)
2017–2018	Estrela V.N.	28	(0)
2020	Honka II	3	(0)
2020–2022	Honka	50	(9)
2023–2024	AIK	49	(12)
2024–2026	Udinese	23	(0)
2026	→ Palermo (loan)	8	(0)
2026–	Vancouver Whitecaps	3	(0)

International career^{‡}
2023–	Angola	7	(0)
Medal record
Men's football
Representing Angola
COSAFA Cup
Winner	2024 South Africa
- * Club domestic league appearances and goals as of 20:56, 12 October 2026 (UTC) ‡ National team caps and goals as of 20:56, 12 October 2026 (UTC)

Rui Manuel Muati Modesto (born 7 October 1999) is a professional footballer who plays as a right-back or wing-back for Major League Soccer club Vancouver Whitecaps. Born in Portugal, he represents the Angola national team. Initially a defender in his native Portugal, Modesto moved to a more attacking role after moving to Finland.

== Early career ==
Modesto was born in Vendas Novas and developed his football skills through various youth clubs in Afeiteira, Estrela Vendas Novas, Juventude Évora and Lusitano Évora.

Modesto made his senior debut with Estrela Vendas Novas first team in the 2017–18 season, playing in Portuguese third tier Campeonato de Portugal.

Between 2018 and 2020, he played with Vitória Setubal U23 in Liga Revelação youth league.

== Club career ==
=== Honka ===
On 17 September 2020, Modesto transferred to Honka in Finnish top-tier Veikkausliiga. Modesto represented Honka in the 2021–22 UEFA Europa Conference League qualifiers in four games. In the 2022 season, he scored 7 goals and provided 12 assists in the league, and was awarded for the most assists of the season.

=== AIK ===
After a two-and-a-half season stint in Finland, Modesto was acquired by Allsvenskan club AIK in preparation for the 2023 season. He signed a three-year contract with the club, for a transfer fee of €500,000.

After his first season with AIK, Modesto was named The Player of the Season by the fans of the club. He finished the season scoring 7 goals in 34 matches, in all competitions combined.

=== Udinese ===
On 30 August 2024, AIK reached an agreement with Serie A club Udinese for the immediate transfer of Modesto for €1.5 million fee. Modesto signed a four-year contract with Udinese.

==== Loan to Palermo ====
On 2 February 2026, Modesto was loaned by Palermo in Serie B, with a conditional obligation to buy.

=== Vancouver Whitecaps ===
On 1 September 2026, Vancouver Whitecaps signed Modesto from Udinese for a fee of €800k. Modesto signed a three-year contract, with a club option for the 2030–31 season.

== International career ==
In June 2023, Modesto received his first call-up to Angola national team for the 2023 Africa Cup of Nations qualification matches against Central African Republic, Madagascar and Ghana. However, he remained an unused substitute during these matches.

Modesto made his debut for the Angola national team on 12 September 2023, in a 4–0 friendly loss against Iran.

On 3 December 2025, Modesto was called up to the Angola squad for the 2025 Africa Cup of Nations.

== Career statistics ==
=== Club ===
As of match played 6 October 2026

Appearances and goals by club, season and competition
Club	Season	League			National cup (Note: Includes Suomen Cup, Svenska Cupen and Coppa Italia)		Europe		Other		Total	
Club	Season	Division	Apps	Goals	Apps	Goals	Apps	Goals	Apps	Goals	Apps	Goals
Estrela V.N.	2017–18	Campeonato de Portugal	28	0	0	0	—		—		28	0
Honka Akatemia	2020	Kakkonen	3	0	—		—		—		3	0
Honka	2020	Veikkausliiga	3	0	0	0	0	0	—		3	0
Honka	2021	Veikkausliiga	21	2	6	1	4 (Note: Appearances in UEFA Europa Conference League)	0	—		31	3
Honka	2022	Veikkausliiga	26	7	1	0	—		4 (Note: Appearances in Finnish League Cup)	1	31	8
Honka	Total		50	9	7	1	4	0	4	1	65	11
AIK	2023	Allsvenskan	29	6	5	1	—		—		34	7
AIK	2024	Allsvenskan	20	6	5	3	—		—		25	9
AIK	Total		49	12	10	4	0	0	0	0	59	16
Udinese	2024–25	Serie A	20	0	2	0	—		—		22	0
Udinese	2025–26	Serie A	3	0	0	0	—		—		3	0
Udinese	Total		23	0	2	0	0	0	0	0	25	0
Palermo (loan)	2025–26	Serie B	8	0	—		—		2 (Note: Appearances in Serie B promotion play-offs)	1	10	1
Vancouver Whitecaps	2026	Major League Soccer	3	0	0	0	—		—		3	0
Career total			164	21	19	5	4	0	6	2	193	28

=== International ===
As of match played 29 December 2025

Appearances and goals by national team and year
National team	Year	Apps	Goals
Angola	2023	2	0
Angola	2024	2	0
Angola	2025	3	0
Total		7	0

== Honours ==
FC Honka

- Finnish League Cup: 2022

Individual

- Veikkausliiga Player of the Month: July 2022
- Veikkausliiga Team of the Year: 2022
- Veikkausliiga Most Assists of the Season: 2022
