= Alexander Fesshaie =

Swedish footballer (born 2004)

Personal information
- Date of birth: 29 February 2004 (age 22)
- Place of birth: Solna, Sweden
- Position: Forward

Team information
- Current team: Helsingborgs IF
- Number: 7

Youth career
- 2008-?: Sundbybergs IK
- ?-2017: Apollon Solna FK
- 2017-2022: AIK

Senior career*
Years	Team	Apps	(Gls)
2022–2026	AIK	21	(2)
2026–	Helsingborgs IF	0	(0)

International career^{‡}
2021–2022	Sweden U19	1	(0)
- * Club domestic league appearances and goals as of 11 November 2025 ‡ National team caps and goals as of 16 April 2023

Alexander Fesshaie Beraki (ˈfɛshaje; born 29 February 2004) is a Swedish professional footballer who plays as a forward for Superettan club Helsingborgs IF.

== Club career ==
Born in Solna, Fesshaie started playing football at Sundbybergs IK and later played in Apollon Solna FK. At age 13 he joined AIK's youth team.

18 October 2022, Fesshaie signed a professional contract with AIK Fotboll until 31 December 2027.

His debut in Allsvenskan was against Halmstads BK on 2 April 2023. His first and second goals were scored in the derby game against Hammarby Fotboll on 16 April 2023.

On 30 January 2026, he signed a contract with Helsingborgs IF, and 14 days later had to go through a surgery due to a blow to the foot and pain arose.

== International career ==
In 2021 he was selected for Sweden U19 against Austria U19.
