= Alex Timossi Andersson =

Swedish football player (born 2001)

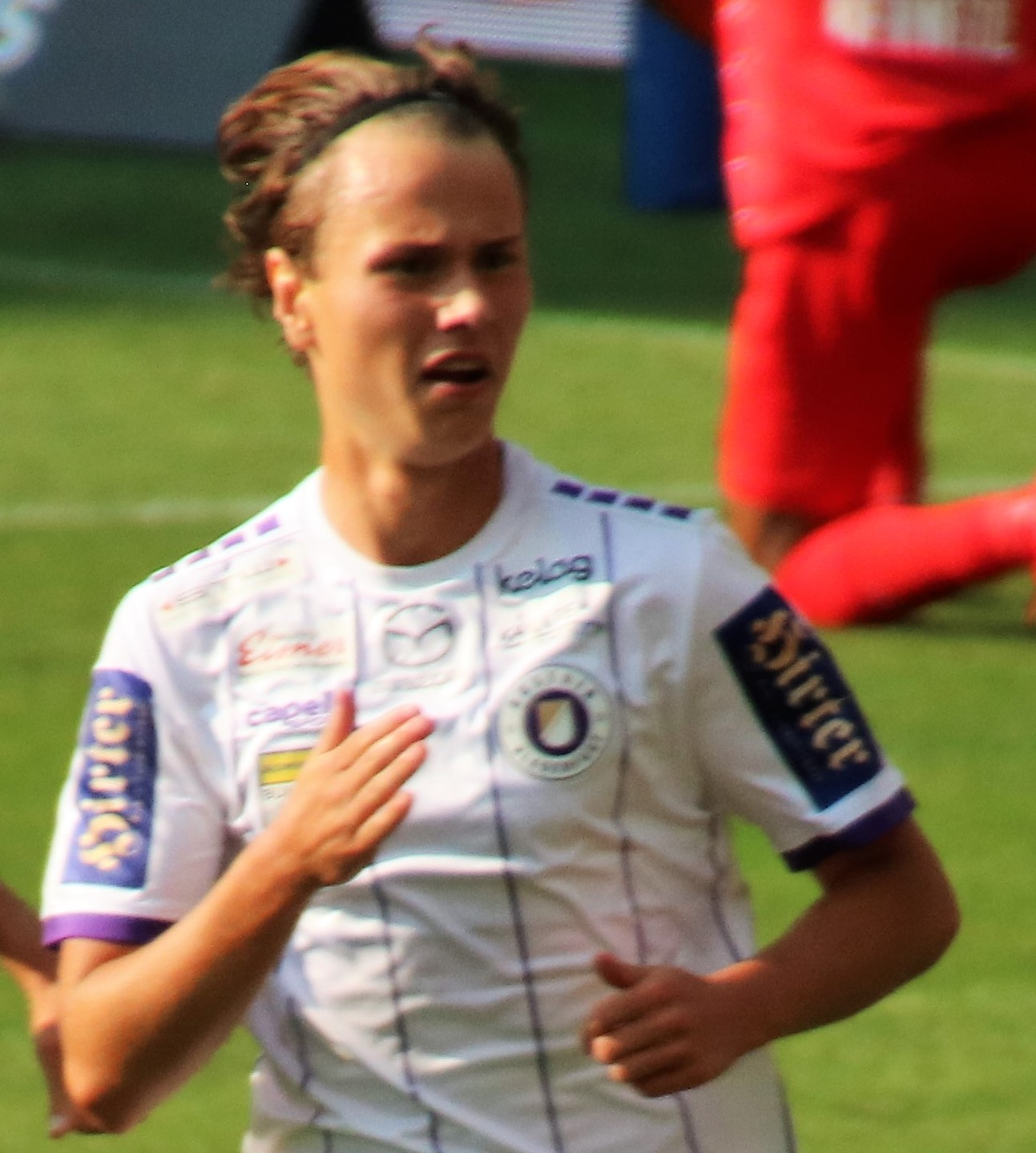
- Timossi Andersson with Austria Klagenfurt in 2021

Personal information
- Full name: Alex Emilio Timossi Andersson
- Date of birth: 19 January 2001 (age 25)
- Place of birth: Helsingborg, Sweden
- Height: 1.70 m (5 ft 7 in)
- Position: Right winger

Team information
- Current team: Śląsk Wrocław
- Number: 21

Youth career
- 2008–2012: Stattena IF
- 2012–2018: Helsingborgs IF
- 2018–2020: Bayern Munich

Senior career*
Years	Team	Apps	(Gls)
2016–2018	Helsingborgs IF	27	(2)
2016	HIF Akademi	12	(3)
2020–2022	Bayern Munich II	0	(0)
2020	→ Helsingborgs IF (loan)	28	(5)
2021–2022	→ Austria Klagenfurt (loan)	44	(9)
2022–2023	Heerenveen	12	(0)
2023–2026	IF Brommapojkarna	75	(9)
2026–	Śląsk Wrocław	0	(0)

International career
2016–2018	Sweden U17	21	(9)
2018–2019	Sweden U19	6	(0)
- * Club domestic league appearances and goals as of 12:03, 9 July 2026 (UTC)

Alex Emilio Timossi Andersson (born 19 January 2001) is a Swedish professional footballer who plays as a right winger for Ekstraklasa club Śląsk Wrocław.

== Club career ==
A youth academy graduate of Helsingborgs IF, Andersson made his senior team debut on 17 April 2017 in a 1–1 draw against Gefle. He scored his first goal on 13 May 2017 in a 2–2 draw against IK Frej.

On 27 October 2017, Bayern Munich announced that they have agreed a transfer with Helsingborgs for Andersson. He was expected to join Bayern on 1 July 2019, but eventually joined the under-19 team of Bayern in July 2018.

On 6 February 2020, Andersson returned to Helsingborgs on a short-term loan deal till 30 June. His contract was later extended till the end of the 2020 Allsvenskan season. On 8 February 2021, he joined Austria Klagenfurt on loan until the end of the season.

On 6 July 2022, Andersson joined Eredivisie club Heerenveen permanently on a four-year contract until 2026, for an undisclosed fee.

On 31 August 2023, Andersson moved back to his native Sweden to play for Allsvenskan club IF Brommapojkarna.

On 7 July 2026, Andersson joined Polish Ekstraklasa club Śląsk Wrocław on a two-year contract.

== International career ==
Andersson is a Swedish youth international. He was part of under-17 team which reached quarter-finals of 2018 UEFA European Under-17 Championship.

== Honours ==
Helsingborgs IF

- Superettan: 2018
