= Abdihakim Ali =

Swedish footballer (born 2002)

Personal information
- Date of birth: 22 January 2002 (age 24)
- Height: 1.78 m (5 ft 10 in)
- Position: Central midfielder

Team information
- Current team: AIK
- Number: 18

Youth career
- Vasalunds Stockholm IF Rinkeby
- –2021: AIK

Senior career*
| Years | Team | Apps | (Gls) |
| 2022 | Vasalund IF | 25 | (3) |
| 2023– | AIK | 39 | (2) |
- * Club domestic league appearances and goals as of 7 July 2026

Abdihakim Ali (born 22 January 2002) is a Swedish footballer who plays as a central midfielder for AIK.

== Career ==
He hails from Rinkeby. Following a period in AIK's academy, he started his senior career in Vasalund IF. After a successful season in the 2022 Division 1, he was brough back to AIK in 2023. He was a regular starter in the fall of 2023, but played less in the start of the 2024 season.

In April 2024 he experienced being injured just six seconds after entering the pitch as a substitute. It was an achilles tendon injury, and he was stretchered off. Following another injury in the spring of 2025, He finally returned from injury in the summer of 2025. He scored a comeback goal in late August against Sirius.

== Personal life ==
For several years following his football debut, he was erroneously referred to in most media as "Abdihakin Ali". On the back of his jerset he wore the name "Hakim".
