= 2025 BK Häcken season =

BK Häcken
2025 season
- Manager: Jens Gustafsson
- Stadium: Bravida Arena
- Svenska Cupen: Winners
- Average home league attendance: 4,806

The 2025 BK Häcken season was the club's 86th year in existence and their 17th consecutive season in the Swedish top flight. The club competed in the 2024–25 Svenska Cupen, the 2025–26 Svenska Cupen, the UEFA Europa League and the UEFA Conference League. They finished the 2024–25 Svenska Cupen as champions.

== Summary ==
On 27 December 2024, Jens Gustafsson was announced as the club's manager.

== First-team squad ==
As of 30 January 2025

Note: Flags indicate national team as defined under FIFA eligibility rules; some limited exceptions apply. Players may hold more than one non-FIFA nationality.

No.	Pos.	Nation	Player
1	GK	SWE	Andreas Linde
2	DF	FIN	Leo Väisänen
3	DF	SWE	Johan Hammar
4	DF	NOR	Marius Lode
5	DF	NOR	Brice Wembangomo
7	DF	DEN	Jacob Barrett Laursen
8	MF	DEN	Silas Andersen
11	FW	SWE	Julius Lindberg
14	MF	SWE	Simon Gustafson (captain)
15	MF	SWE	Samuel Leach Holm
16	MF	SWE	Pontus Dahbo
17	DF	SWE	Ben Engdahl
18	MF	DEN	Mikkel Rygaard
19	FW	SRB	Srđan Hrstić

No.	Pos.	Nation	Player
21	DF	SWE	Adam Lundkvist
22	DF	SRB	Nikola Zečević
24	FW	TUN	Amor Layouni
25	DF	SEN	Abdoulaye Faye
26	GK	SWE	Peter Abrahamsson
29	FW	SWE	Zeidane Inoussa
31	DF	SWE	Charlie Axede
32	GK	SWE	Oscar Jansson
33	FW	UGA	John Paul Dembe
34	FW	CIV	Severin Nioule
35	MF	SWE	Sigge Jansson
39	MF	SWE	Isak Brusberg

=== Out on loan ===
Note: Flags indicate national team as defined under FIFA eligibility rules; some limited exceptions apply. Players may hold more than one non-FIFA nationality.

No.	Pos.	Nation	Player
—	DF	SWE	Johannes Engvall (at Norrby IF until 30 November 2025)
—	MF	SWE	Joel Hjalmar (at Norrby IF until 30 November 2025)

No.	Pos.	Nation	Player
—	FW	SWE	Jeremy Agbonifo (at Lens until 30 June 2025)

== Transfers in ==
Pos.	Player	Transferred from	Fee	Notes	Date	Source
FW	(Finland) Adrian Svanbäck	(Sweden) Helsingborgs IF		Transfer	29 June 2025	
DF	(Sweden) Olle Samuelsson	(Sweden) Sandvikens IF		Transfer	1 July 2025	
MF	(Denmark) Sanders Ngabo	(Denmark) AC Horsens		Transfer	2 July 2025	
MF	(Denmark) Lasse Madsen	(Denmark) Silkeborg IF		Transfer	8 July 2025	
MF	(Iraq) Danilo Al-Saed	(Netherlands) SC Heerenveen		Transfer	16 July 2025	
MF	(Tanzania) Sabri Kondo	(Tanzania) Singida SC		Transfer	1 August 2025	
MF	(Ivory Coast) Christ Wawa	(Ivory Coast) RC Abidjan		Transfer	12 August 2025	
DF	(Sweden) Filip Helander	(Cyprus) AC Omonia		Loan	29 August 2025	
DF	(Sweden) Filip Helander	(Cyprus) AC Omonia		Permanent transfer	11 December 2025	

== Transfers out ==
Pos.	Player	Transferred to	Fee	Notes	Date	Source
MF	(Sweden) Joel Hjalmar	(Sweden) Norrby IF		Loan	29 January 2025	
MF	(Sweden) Jeremy Agbonifo	(France) RC Lens		Transfer	26 April 2025	
MF	(Sweden) Zeidane Inoussa	(Wales) Swansea City		Transfer	5 May 2025	
DF	(Senegal) Abdoulaye Faye	(Germany) Bayer Leverkusen		Transfer	27 June 2025	

== Friendlies ==
16 June 2025	Tromsø IL	v	BK Häcken	Sarpsborg Stadion
		Report

== Competitions ==
=== Allsvenskan ===
==== League table ====
Pos	Team	Pld	W	D	L	GF	GA	GD	Pts
8	IF Elfsborg	30	12	4	14	45	51	−6	40
9	IK Sirius	30	11	6	13	53	51	+2	39
10	BK Häcken	30	9	8	13	42	50	−8	35
11	Halmstads BK	30	10	5	15	24	50	−26	35
12	IF Brommapojkarna	30	9	4	17	40	47	−7	31

Source: svenskfotboll.se (in Swedish)
Rules for classification: 1) Points; 2) Goal difference; 3) Goals scored; 4) Head-to-head points; 5) Head-to-head goal difference; 6) Head-to-head away goals scored; 7) Play-off
(Note: Play-off is only played if need to decide champion, teams for relegation or UEFA competition and will be played on a neutral ground).

==== Matches ====
20 April 2025 Round 4	IFK Göteborg	2–3	BK Häcken	Gothenburg
16:30	Þórðarson 38'; Fenger 45' (pen.)	Report	Hrstić 23'; Layouni 45+2'; Gustafson 90+7'	Stadium: Gamla Ullevi; Attendance: 17,318; Referee: Glenn Nyberg

14 May 2025 9	Häcken	3-3	AIK	Göteborg
19:00	Berisha (yellow card) 16'; Filip Öhman (yellow card) 53'; Leach Holm 58' 90+2'; Severin Nioule 62'; Andersen (yellow card) 85'	Report	Hansen 16' (yellow card) 26'; Salétros (yellow card) 30'; Andersson 69'; Kakoullis 72'	Stadium: Bravida Arena; Attendance: 5,884; Referee: (Sweden) Kristoffer Karlsson

26 May 2025 Match 11	Djurgården	1–1	Häcken	Stockholm
19:10 CET	Priske 63'; Bergh (yellow card) 88'	Report	Gustafson 50'; Dahbo (yellow card) 67'; Andersen (yellow card) 75'; Dembe (yellow card) 89'	Stadium: 3Arena; Attendance: 16,483; Referee: (Sweden) Adi Aganovic

1 June 2025 Matchday 12	Malmö FF	3–0	BK Häcken	Malmö
14:00	Karlsson 9'; Busuladžić 33'; Kiese Thelin 85'	Report		Stadium: Stadion; Attendance: 17,341; Referee: Adam Ladebäck

27 July 2025 Match 17	Häcken	1–6	Djurgården	Gothenburg
14:00 CET	Dahbo (yellow card) 23'; Lundkvist (yellow card) 37'; Leach Holm (yellow card) 40'; Lode (red card) 50'; Layouni 66'; Gustafson (red card) 71'	Report	Tenho 10'; Nguen 18' 21'; Priske 44' 58'; Anderson (yellow card) 71'; Sawo 87'	Stadium: Bravida Arena; Attendance: 6,015; Referee: (Sweden) Richard Sundell

15 September 2025 Round 23	BK Häcken	1–2	IFK Göteborg	Gothenburg
19:10	Rygaard 40'	Report	Heintz 13', 71'	Stadium: Bravida Arena; Attendance: 6,316; Referee: Kristoffer Karlsson

2 November 2025 Matchday 29	BK Häcken	v	Malmö FF	Gothenburg
		Report		Stadium: Bravida Arena

=== 2024–25 Svenska Cupen ===
The tournament continued from the 2024 season.

==== Group stage ====
Pos	Team	Pld	W	D	L	GF	GA	GD	Pts	Qualification	BKH	ÖIF	IKS	HEL
1	BK Häcken	3	2	0	1	7	3	+4	6	Advance to Knockout stage		3–0	0–2	
2	Östers IF	3	2	0	1	4	3	+1	6					1–0
3	IK Sirius	3	2	0	1	4	4	0	6			0–3		2–1
4	Helsingborgs IF	3	0	0	3	2	7	−5	0		1–4			

Updated to match(es) played on 1 March 2025. Source: SvFF
Rules for classification: 1) Points; 2) Goal difference; 3) Goals scored; 4) Head-to-head record; 5) Lowest disciplinary points; 6) Highest ranked team

17 February 2025 Matchday 1	BK Häcken	3–0	Östers IF	Gothenburg
	Andersen 17'; Hrstić 51'; Faye 69'	Report		Stadium: Nordic Wellness Arena; Attendance: 1,846; Referee: Fikret Buqa

23 February 2025 Matchday 2	Helsingborgs IF	1–4	BK Häcken
	Silverholt 9'	Report	Hammar 30'; Inoussa 64'; Layouni 73'; Dembe 87'	Referee: Oscar Johnson

1 March 2025 Matchday 3	BK Häcken	0–2	IK Sirius	Gothenburg
		Report	Lindberg 33'; Persson 38'	Stadium: Nordic Wellness Arena; Attendance: 2,015; Referee: Joakim Sars

===== Knockout stage =====
8 March 2025 Quarter-finals	Mjällby AIF	0–1	BK Häcken	Hällevik
16:00 CET (UTC+1)		Report	Faye 90+4'	Stadium: Strandvallen; Attendance: 1,908; Referee: Victor Wolf

16 March 2025 Semi–finals	BK Häcken	3–1	IFK Norrköping	Gothenburg
13:00 CET (UTC+1)	Hrstić 24'; Lundkvist 45+1'; Holm 83'	Report	Prica 18'	Stadium: Bravida Arena; Attendance: 3,688; Referee: Joakim Östling

29 May 2025 Final	Malmö FF	0–0 (a.e.t.) (2–4 p)	BK Häcken	Malmö
15:00 CET (UTC+1)				Stadium: Eleda Stadion; Attendance: 20,189; Referee: Glenn Nyberg
	Penalties
	Hakšabanović (penalty missed); Berg (penalty scored); Busanello (penalty missed); Rosengren (penalty scored)		(penalty missed) Gustafson; (penalty scored) Leach Holm; (penalty scored) Lundkvist; (penalty scored) Berisha; (penalty scored) Andersen

=== UEFA Europa League ===
10 July 2025	Spartak Trnava (Slovakia)	0–1	(Sweden) BK Häcken	Anton Malatinský Stadium, Trnava
20:15		Report	Nioule 63'	Attendance: 10,125; Referee: Bence Csonka (Hungary)

17 July 2025	BK Häcken (Sweden)	2–2	(Slovakia) Spartak Trnava	Bravida Arena, Gothenburg
19:00	Gustafson 13' (pen.); Dembe 90+6'	Report	Procházka 65'; Moistsrapishvili 82'	Attendance: 3,636; Referee: Ívar Orri Kristjánsson (Iceland)

24 July 2025	Anderlecht (Belgium)	1–0	(Sweden) BK Häcken	Constant Vanden Stock Stadium, Brussels
20:00	Dolberg 35'	Report		Attendance: 12,291; Referee: Eldorjan Hamiti (Albania)

31 July 2025	BK Häcken (Sweden)	2–1 (a.e.t.) (4–2 p)	(Belgium) Anderlecht	Bravida Arena, Gothenburg
19:00	Svanbäck 33'; Gustafson 90+2' (pen.)	Report	Dolberg 54' (pen.)	Attendance: 4,016; Referee: Patrik Kolarić (Croatia)
	Penalties
	Gustafson (penalty scored); Layouni (penalty scored); Lundkvist (penalty scored); Berisha (penalty scored)		(penalty scored) Hazard; (penalty missed) Augustinsson; (penalty scored) Llansana; (penalty missed) Vázquez

7 August 2025	BK Häcken (Sweden)	0–2	(Norway) Brann	Bravida Arena, Gothenburg
19:00		Report	Magnússon 28', 57'	Attendance: 4,516; Referee: Georgi Kabakov (Bulgaria)

14 August 2025	Brann (Norway)	0–1	(Sweden) BK Häcken	Brann Stadion, Bergen
19:00		Report	De Roeve 38' (o.g.)	Attendance: 14,750; Referee: Nick Walsh (Scotland)

=== UEFA Conference League ===
21 August 2025	BK Häcken (Sweden)	7–2	(Romania) CFR Cluj	Bravida Arena, Gothenburg
19:00	Gustafson 2', 35'; Andersen 18'; Svanbäck 24'; Brusberg 49'; Dembe 61', 70'	Report	Korenica 38'; Cordea 50'	Attendance: 3,173; Referee: Lukas Fähndrich (Switzerland)

28 August 2025	CFR Cluj (Romania)	1–0	(Sweden) BK Häcken	Dr. Constantin Rădulescu Stadium, Cluj-Napoca
19:30 (20:30 UTC+3)	Păun 48'	Report		Attendance: 3,321; Referee: Sebastian Gishamer (Austria)

2 October 2025	Shelbourne (Republic of Ireland)	0–0	(Sweden) BK Häcken	Tallaght Stadium, Dublin (Note: Shelbourne played their home matches at Tallaght Stadium, Dublin, instead of their regular stadium, Tolka Park, Dublin, which did not meet UEFA requirements.)
21:00 (20:00 UTC+1)		Report		Attendance: 5,675; Referee: Paweł Raczkowski (Poland)

23 October 2025	BK Häcken (Sweden)	2–2	(Spain) Rayo Vallecano	Gamla Ullevi, Gothenburg (Note: BK Häcken played their home matches at Gamla Ullevi, Gothenburg, instead of their regular stadium, Bravida Arena, Gothenburg, which did not meet UEFA requirements.)
18:45	Lindberg 41'; Brusberg 55'	Report	Á. García 15'; Rațiu 90+13' (pen.)	Attendance: 6,408; Referee: Antoni Bandić (Bosnia and Herzegovina)

6 November 2025	BK Häcken (Sweden)	1–2	(France) Strasbourg	Gamla Ullevi, Gothenburg
21:00	Dembe 61'	Report	Enciso 21'; Godo 60'	Attendance: 4,082; Referee: Luca Pairetto (Italy)

27 November 2025	Zrinjski Mostar (Bosnia and Herzegovina)	2–1	(Sweden) BK Häcken	Stadion pod Bijelim Brijegom, Mostar
18:45	Ćuže 78'; Bilbija 82'	Report	Andersen 40'	Attendance: 3,100; Referee: Christian-Petru Ciochirca (Austria)

11 December 2025	BK Häcken (Sweden)	1–1	(Cyprus) AEK Larnaca	Gamla Ullevi, Gothenburg
18:45	Hammar 90+4'	Report	Helander 65' (o.g.)	Attendance: 4,412; Referee: Yigal Frid (Israel)

18 December 2025	Slovan Bratislava (Slovakia)	1–0	(Sweden) BK Häcken	Tehelné pole, Bratislava
21:00	Blackman 85'	Report		Attendance: 7,879; Referee: Florian Lata (Albania)
