= 2024 BK Häcken season =

BK Häcken
2024 season
- Manager: Paco Johansen (until 23 September); Joop Oosterveld (from 24 September)
- Stadium: Bravida Arena
- Allsvenskan: 9th
- Svenska Cupen: Group stage
- UEFA Conference League: Second qualifying round
- Top goalscorer: League: Julius Lindberg (4); All: Julius Lindberg (5)
- Biggest defeat: Malmö 4–0 Häcken
Home colours	Away colours

The 2024 BK Häcken season is the club's 85th year in existence and their 16th consecutive season in the Swedish top flight. Häcken played their first match on 17 February.

== Players ==
=== First-team squad ===
As of 31 January 2024

Note: Flags indicate national team as defined under FIFA eligibility rules; some limited exceptions apply. Players may hold more than one non-FIFA nationality.

No.	Pos.	Nation	Player
1	GK	SWE	Johan Brattberg
3	DF	SWE	Johan Hammar
5	DF	NOR	Even Hovland
7	DF	DEN	Jacob Barrett Laursen
8	MF	NGR	Ishaq Abdulrazak (on loan from Anderlecht)
9	FW	NOR	Ola Kamara
10	MF	TUN	Ali Youssef
11	MF	SWE	Julius Lindberg
12	DF	ISL	Valgeir Lunddal Friðriksson
13	DF	SWE	Simon Sandberg
14	MF	SWE	Simon Gustafson
15	DF	BIH	Kadir Hodžić
16	MF	SWE	Pontus Dahbo
17	FW	ZAM	Edward Chilufya (on loan from Midtjylland)

No.	Pos.	Nation	Player
18	MF	DEN	Mikkel Rygaard
19	FW	SRB	Srđan Hrstić
20	FW	JAM	Blair Turgott
22	MF	SWE	Tobias Sana
24	FW	TUN	Amor Layouni
26	GK	SWE	Peter Abrahamsson
27	MF	CIV	Amane Romeo
29	FW	MKD	Filip Trpchevski
30	GK	SWE	Sebastian Banozic
31	DF	SWE	Charlie Axede
32	GK	SWE	Andreas Linde
33	FW	UGA	John Paul Dembe (on loan from KCCA)
35	DF	SWE	Sigge Jansson

=== Out on loan ===
Note: Flags indicate national team as defined under FIFA eligibility rules; some limited exceptions apply. Players may hold more than one non-FIFA nationality.

No.	Pos.	Nation	Player
—	MF	SWE	Semir Bosnic (to Norrby until 30 November 2023)
—	FW	SWE	Anomnachi Chidi (to Ahlafors until 30 November 2023)

== Transfers ==
=== In ===
Pos.	Player	Transferred from	Fee	Date	Source
MF	(Sweden) Julius Lindberg	(Sweden) GAIS	Free	8 January 2024	
DF	(Sweden) Adam Lundqvist	(United States) Austin FC	Free	1 February 2024	
FW	(Uganda) John Paul Dembe	(Uganda) Kampala City	Undisclosed	1 February 2024	
GK	(Sweden) Andreas Linde	(Germany) Greuther Fürth	Undisclosed	1 February 2024	
DF	(Serbia) Nikola Zečević	(Serbia) FK Voždovac	Undisclosed	6 February 2024	

=== Out ===
Pos.	Player	Transferred to	Fee	Date	Source
DF	(Syria) Aiham Ousou	(Czech Republic) Slavia Prague	Loan return	31 December 2023	
MF	(Sweden) Momodou Sonko	(Belgium) KAA Gent	€8,000,000	29 January 2024	

== Pre-season and friendlies ==
25 January 2024 Friendly	Häcken (Sweden)	2–4	(Denmark) Midtjylland	Gothenburg
11:30	Amane 13'; Layouni 23'; Faye (yellow card) 38'	Report	Simsir 3', 41', (yellow card) 25'; Iheanacho 68'; Musa 103'	Stadium: Bravida Arena

2 February 2024 Friendly	Tromsø (Norway)	4–2	(Sweden) Häcken	Marbella, Spain
16:00				Stadium: Banús Football Center

6 February 2024 Friendly	Häcken (Sweden)	2–4	(Norway) Haugesund	Marbella, Spain
16:00				Stadium: Banús Football Center

10 February 2024 Friendly	Nordsjælland (Denmark)	3–0	(Sweden) Häcken	Farum, Denmark
13:00				Stadium: Right to Dream Park

9 March 2024 Friendly	Häcken (Sweden)	2–1	(Sweden) Hammarby IF	Gothenburg
14:00	Hrstić 5'; Lindberg 16'		Pinas 64'	Stadium: Gothia Park Academy

16 March 2024 Friendly	Häcken (Sweden)	1–3	(Sweden) IF Elfsborg	Gothenburg
13:00	Rygaard 9'	Report	Ouma 7'; Frick 72'; Söderberg 89'	Stadium: Bravida Arena

22 March 2024 Friendly	Häcken (Sweden)	5–1	(Denmark) Næstved BK	Gothenburg
12:00	Chilufya 6'; Amane 14'; Lindberg 45+1'; Layouni 62'; Abdulrazak 85'	Report	Friedrich 67'	Stadium: Bravida Arena

28 June 2024 Friendly	Kalmar FF (Sweden)	3–2	(Sweden) Häcken
16:00

30 June 2024 Friendly	Häcken (Sweden)	4–2	(Sweden) Halmstads BK	Borgholm
15:00	Lindberg 3'; Youssef 22'; Layouni 47'; Inoussa 54'		Turgott 11'; Wallentin 50'	Stadium: Ekerum Park
Note: 2 X 35 minutes.

== Competitions ==
=== Overall record ===
Competition	First match	Last match	Starting round	Final position	Record							
Competition	First match	Last match	Starting round	Final position	Pld	W	D	L	GF	GA	GD	Win %
Allsvenskan	31 March 2024	November 2024	Matchday 1		17	8	3	6	35	30	+5	47.06
Svenska Cupen	17 February 2024	2 March 2024	Group stage	Group stage	3	1	1	1	5	4	+1	33.33
UEFA Conference League	25 July 2024		Second qualifying round		3	3	0	0	18	4	+14	100.00
Total					23	12	4	7	58	38	+20	52.17

Last updated: 2 June 2024
Source: Soccerway

=== Allsvenskan ===
==== League table ====
Pos	Team	Pld	W	D	L	GF	GA	GD	Pts	Qualification or relegation
6	GAIS	30	14	6	10	36	34	+2	48	
7	IF Elfsborg	30	13	6	11	52	44	+8	45	
8	BK Häcken	30	12	6	12	54	51	+3	42	Qualification for the Europa League first qualifying round (Note: BK Häcken qualified for the Europa League first qualifying round as the 2024–25 Svenska Cupen winners.)
9	IK Sirius	30	12	5	13	47	46	+1	41	
10	IF Brommapojkarna	30	8	10	12	46	53	−7	34	

Source: svenskfotboll.se (in Swedish)
Rules for classification: 1) Points; 2) Goal difference; 3) Goals scored; 4) Head-to-head points; 5) Head-to-head goal difference; 6) Head-to-head away goals scored; 7) Play-off
(Note: Play-off is only played if need to decide champion, teams for relegation or UEFA competition and will be played on a neutral ground).

==== Results summary ====
Overall								Home						Away					
Pld	W	D	L	GF	GA	GD	Pts	W	D	L	GF	GA	GD	W	D	L	GF	GA	GD
13	6	2	5	24	22	+2	20	4	1	2	16	11	+5	2	1	3	8	11	−3

Last updated: 2 June 2024.
Source: Worldfootball

==== Results by round ====
Round	1	2	3	4	5	6	7	8	9	10	11	12	13	14	15	16	17
Ground	H	A	H	H	A	H	A	H	A	H	A	H	A	H	A	H	A
Result	L	D	W	W	W	L	W	W	L	D	L	W					L
Position	10	11	9	6	3	6	4	3									

Updated to match(es) played on 2 June 2024. Source: Worldfootball
A = Away; H = Home; W = Win; D = Draw; L = Loss

==== Matches ====
31 March 2024 1	Häcken	0–1	Mjällby	Gothenburg
16:30 CEST (UTC+2)			Gustafson 63'	Stadium: Bravida Arena; Attendance: 3,631; Referee: Oscar Johnson

8 April 2024 2	Djurgården	3–3	Häcken	Stockholm
19:10 CEST (UTC+2)	Nguen 87', 89'; Danielson 90+4' (pen.)		Chilufya 23'; Lindberg 58'; Inoussa 64'	Stadium: Tele2 Arena; Attendance: 22,485; Referee: Mohammed Al-Hakim

15 April 2024 3	Häcken	4–3	IF Brommapojkarna	Gothenburg
19:00 CEST (UTC+2)	Gustafson 3'; Layouni 35'; Inoussa 57'; Chilufya (yellow card) 65'; Lindberg 69', (yellow card) 72'		Irandust 16'; Fritzson 25'; Barslund 60'	Stadium: Bravida Arena; Attendance: 3,265; Referee: Granit Maqedonci

21 April 2024 4	Häcken	2–1	Hammarby	Gothenburg
16:30 CEST (UTC+2)	Gustafson 62'; Hovland 87'		Kurtulus 30'	Stadium: Bravida Arena; Referee: Fredrik Klitte

24 April 2024 5	IFK Göteborg	0–1	Häcken	Gothenburg
19:00 CEST (UTC+2)			Layouni 45+6'	Stadium: Gamla Ullevi; Referee: Kristoffer Karlsson

28 April 2024 6	Häcken	1–2	IFK Norrköping	Gothenburg
16:30 CEST (UTC+2)	Hrstić 63'		Prica 25'; Traustason 59'	Stadium: Bravida Arena; Referee: Mohammed Al-Hakim

4 May 2024 7	Sirius	0–3	Häcken	Uppsala
17:30 CEST (UTC+2)			Lindberg 6'; Hrstić 17'; Inoussa 27'	Stadium: Studenternas IP; Referee: Joakim Östling

12 May 2024 8	Häcken	3–1	Kalmar FF	Gothenburg
14:00 CEST (UTC+2)	Hrstić 41', 52'; Rygaard 55'		Trenskow 36'	Stadium: Bravida Arena; Referee: Granit Maqedonci

15 May 2024 9	Halmstad	3–0	Häcken	Halmstad
19:00 CEST (UTC+2)	Wallentin 22'; Mohammed 44'; Granath 46'			Stadium: Örjans Vall; Referee: Richard Sundell

20 May 2024 10	Häcken	2–2	Malmö FF	Gothenburg
19:10 CEST (UTC+2)	Lindberg 76'; Gustafson 90+3' (pen.)		Nanasi 8'; Kiese Thelin 48'	Stadium: Bravida Arena; Referee: Fredrik Klitte

25 May 2024 11	GAIS	3–0	Häcken	Gothenburg
16:00 CEST (UTC+2)	Milovanovic 4'; Cooper Love 45+2', 57'			Stadium: Gamla Ullevi; Referee: Mohammed Al-Hakim

29 May 2024 17	Mjällby AIF	2–1	Häcken	Sölvesborg
19:00 CEST (UTC+2)	Bergström 6'; Stroud 46'		Lunddal Friðriksson 48'	Stadium: Strandvallen; Referee: Kristoffer Karlsson

2 June 2024 12	Häcken	4–1	AIK	Gothenburg
16:30 CEST (UTC+2)	Lunddal Friðriksson 21'; Chilufya 42'; Layouni 50'; Rygaard 53'		Pittas 57'	Stadium: Bravida Arena; Referee: Joakim Östling

=== 2023–24 Svenska Cupen ===
==== Group stage ====
Pos	Team	Pld	W	D	L	GF	GA	GD	Pts	Qualification	IFB	BKH	ÖFK	LAN
1	IF Brommapojkarna	3	2	1	0	5	1	+4	7	Advance to Knockout stage			1–0	3–0
2	BK Häcken	3	1	1	1	5	4	+1	4		1–1		2–0	
3	Östersunds FK	3	1	0	2	1	3	−2	3					1–0
4	Landskrona BoIS	3	1	0	2	3	6	−3	3			3–2		

Source: SvFF
Rules for classification: 1) Points; 2) Goal difference; 3) Goals scored; 4) Head-to-head record; 5) Lowest disciplinary points; 6) Highest ranked team

17 February 2024 1	Häcken	2–0	Östersund	Gothenburg
13:00 CET (UTC+1)	Zečević (yellow card) 12'; Hrstić (yellow card) 32'; Youssef 52'; Abdulrazak 83'; Layouni (yellow card) 90+1'	Report	Jablinski (yellow card) 60'; N'sa (yellow card) 81'	Stadium: Bravida Arena; Referee: Joakim Östling

26 February 2024 2	Landskrona BoIS	3–2	Häcken	Landskrona
18:30 CET (UTC+1)	Dzabic 29'; Edvardsson (yellow card) 42'; Egnell 55'; Karlsson 77'		Lindberg 13', (yellow card) 57'; Sandberg 45+2'; Hrstić (yellow card) 49'; Rygaard (yellow card) 81'; Zečević (yellow card) 88'; Lundqvist (yellow card) 90+3'	Stadium: Landskrona IP; Referee: Per Melin

2 March 2024 3	Häcken	1–1	IF Brommapojkarna	Gothenburg
15:15 CET (UTC+1)	Youssef 5'; Lundqvist (yellow card) 39'; Zečević (yellow card) 84'; Lindberg (yellow card) 87'		Odefalk 45+4'; Sidklev (yellow card) 88'	Stadium: Bravida Arena; Referee: Fredrik Oppong

=== UEFA Conference League ===
==== Second qualifying round ====
25 July 2024 First leg	F91 Dudelange (Luxembourg)	2–6	Häcken	Dudelange, Luxembourg
19:00	Stumpf (yellow card) 22'; Hadji 32' (pen.) 44' (pen.); Englaro (yellow card) 34'; Zrankeon (yellow card) 71'; Decker (yellow card) 78'; Kirch (yellow card) 79'	Report	Inoussa 6'; Layouni 21', 45+1'; Rygaard (yellow card) 31'; Youssef 35', 60'; Lundqvist (yellow card) 43'; Hrstić 88'	Stadium: Stade Jos Nosbaum; Attendance: 1,136; Referee: Antoni Bandić (Bosnia and Herzegovina)

31 July 2024 Second leg	Häcken	6–1 (12–3 agg.)	(Luxembourg) F91 Dudelange	Gothenburg
19:00	Agbonifo 16', 27' (yellow card) 31'; Hrstić 45', 48'; Nioule 53'; Hammar 57'	Report	Bojić 4'; Decker (yellow card) 19' (yellow-red card) 39'	Stadium: Bravida Arena; Attendance: 2,061; Referee: Igor Stojchevski (North Macedonia)

==== Third qualifying round ====
7 August 2024 First leg	Häcken	6–1	(Estonia) Paide Linnameeskond	Gothenburg
19:00	Amane 5', 6'; Layouni 35', 90+1'; Inoussa 64'; Hrstić (yellow card) 70'; Agbonifo 89'	Report	Ceesay 32' (yellow card) 59'	Stadium: Bravida Arena; Attendance: 2,889; Referee: Daniyar Sakhi (Kazakhstan)

13 August 2024 Second leg	Paide Linnameeskond (Estonia)	1–1 (7–2 agg.)	Häcken	Tallinn, Estonia
18:30	Luts (yellow card) 31'; Saarma 33'; Medić (yellow card) 44'; D. Luts (yellow card) 55'; Piht (yellow card) 90+2'	Report	Lundqvist 7' (yellow card) 55'; Layouni (yellow card) 68'	Stadium: Lilleküla Stadium; Attendance: 1,470; Referee: Volen Chinkov (Bulgaria)

==== Play-off round ====
22 August 2024 First leg	Häcken	1–2	(Germany) Heidenheim	Gothenburg
19:00	Rygaard 36'; Layouni (yellow card) 45+1'	Report	Conteh 31' (yellow card) 34'; Kerber (yellow card) 57'; Léo Scienza 65'; Maloney (yellow card) 90+2'	Stadium: Bravida Arena; Referee: Viktor Kopiievskyi (Ukraine)

29 August 2024 Second leg	Heidenheim (Germany)	v	Häcken	Heidenheim, Germany
				Stadium: Voith-Arena; Referee: Giorgi Kruashvili (Georgia (country))
