= 2025–26 CFR Cluj season =

Romanian football club season

CFR Cluj
2025–26 season
- Owner: Ioan Varga
- Chairman: Iuliu Muresan
- Manager: Dan Petrescu (until 21 August) Andrea Mandorlini (until 21 October); Ovidiu Hoban (until 31 October); Daniel Pancu (from 1 November)
- Stadium: Dr. Constantin Rădulescu Stadium
- Liga I: 3rd
- Cupa României: Quarter-finals
- UEFA Europa League: Third qualifying round
- UEFA Conference League: Play-off round
- Supercupa României: Runners-up
- Top goalscorer: League: Andrei Cordea (13); All: Andrei Cordea (15)
Home colours	Away colours	Third colours

The 2025-26 season is the 118th season in the history of CFR Cluj, and the club's 22nd consecutive season in Liga I. In addition to the domestic league, the team will participate in the Cupa României, Supercupa României and the UEFA Europa League.

== Summary ==
=== July ===
Cluj began their season with a 2–1 loss to FCSB in the Supercupa României on 5 July. Alin Fică had equalised but FCSB scored the winner in added time. On 10 July, Cluj drew 0–0 with Paks in the first leg of the first qualifying round to the Europa League. On 13 July, Cluj won 2–1 against Unirea Slobozia after their new signing Daniel Dumbrăvanu scored the winner in added time. On 17 July, Cluj defeated Paks 3–0 in the second leg to advance to the second qualifying round. On 20 July, Cluj were held to a 1–1 draw by Rapid, despite a goal from Postolachi in the first half to take the lead. On 24 July, Cluj draw 0–0 with Lugano in the first leg of the second qualifying round in Switzerland.

== Transfers ==
=== In ===
Pos.	Player	Transferred from	Fee	Date	Source
FW	(North Macedonia) Marko Gjorgjievski	(North Macedonia) Sileks	Free	31 May 2025	
MF	(Kosovo) Drilon Islami	(Kosovo) Prishtina		2 June 2025	
MF	(Croatia) Karlo Muhar	(Saudi Arabia) Al-Orobah	Free	4 June 2025	
MF	(Croatia) Antonio Bosec	(Croatia) Slaven Belupo	Free	4 June 2025	
DF	(Moldova) Daniel Dumbrăvanu	(Italy) Lucchese		19 June 2025	
FW	(Romania) Tudor Cociș	(Romania) Sănătatea	Free	5 June 2025	
DF	(France) Kurt Zouma	(England) West Ham	Free	3 September 2025	

=== Out ===
Pos.	Player	Transferred to	Fee	Date	Source
DF	(Bosnia and Herzegovina) Daniel Graovac	(Romania) FCSB	Free agent	1 July 2025	
DF	(Bosnia and Herzegovina) Luka Juričić	(Bosnia and Herzegovina) FK Borac Banja Luka		7 July 2025	
FW	(Nigeria) Peter Michael	(Israel) Ironi Tiberias		7 July 2025	

== Friendlies ==
=== Pre-season ===
23 June 2025 Friendly	CFR Cluj	4–2	Slovan Bratislava	Austria
	Postolachi 10', 57'; Păun 44'; Gjorgjievski 90+2'	Report	Tolić 41'; Strelec 71'	Stadium: DANA Arena Windischgarsten

26 June 2025 Friendly	CFR Cluj	2–2	Grazer AK	Austria
	Sfait 12'; Deac 52'	Report	Jano 22'; Satin 50'	Stadium: DANA Arena Windischgarsten

28 June 2025 Friendly	CFR Cluj	3–0	SK Dynamo České Budějovice	Austria
	Gjorgjievski 19'; Fică 26'; Ciubăncan 55'	Report		Stadium: Lehner Arena Sierning

30 June 2025 Friendly	CFR Cluj	2–0	Debreceni VSC	Austria
	Emërllahu 17'; Kamara 64'	Report

== Competitions ==
=== Overall Record ===
Competition	First match	Last match	Starting round	Final position	Record							
Competition	First match	Last match	Starting round	Final position	Pld	W	D	L	GF	GA	GD	Win %
Liga I	13 July 2025		Matchday 1		30	15	8	7	49	40	+9	50.00
Cupa României					0	0	0	0	0	0	+0	—
UEFA Europa League	10 July 2025	14 August 2025	First qualifying round	Third qualifying round	6	2	2	2	5	4	+1	33.33
UEFA Conference League	21 August 2025	28 August 2025	Play-off round	Play-off round	2	1	0	1	3	7	−4	50.00
Supercupa României	5 July 2025		Final	Runners-up	1	0	0	1	1	2	−1	0.00
Total					39	18	10	11	58	53	+5	46.15

Last updated: 6 September 2025
Source: Soccerway

=== Liga I ===
==== Regular season ====
Pos	Team	Pld	W	D	L	GF	GA	GD	Pts	Qualification
2	Rapid București	30	16	8	6	47	30	+17	56	Advances to Play-off
3	Universitatea Cluj	30	16	6	8	48	27	+21	54	Advances to Play-off
4	CFR Cluj	30	15	8	7	49	40	+9	53	Advances to Play-off
5	Dinamo București	30	14	10	6	42	28	+14	52	Advances to Play-off
6	Argeș Pitești	30	15	5	10	37	28	+9	50	Advances to Play-off

Source: LPF (in Romanian)
Rules for classification: 1) Points; 2) Head-to-head points; 3) Head-to-head goal difference; 4) Head-to-head goals scored; 5) Goal difference; 6) Goals scored; 7) Play-off.

==== Matches ====
Match schedule

13 July 2024 1	CFR Cluj	2–1	Unirea Slobozia	Cluj-Napoca
19:30	Postolachi 15'; Dumbrăvanu 90+4'	Report	Afalna 45+1'	Stadium: Dr. Constantin Rădulescu Stadium; Attendance: 2,336; Referee: Cristian Moldoveanu

20 July 2025 2	Rapid Bucureşti	1–1	CFR Cluj	Giulești, Bucharest
19:30	Koljić 47'	Report	Postolachi 25'	Stadium: Rapid-Giulești Stadium; Attendance: 11,837; Referee: István Kovács

27 July 2025 3	CFR Cluj	0–2	FC Argeș	Cluj-Napoca
16:30		Report	Sierra 42'; Sadriu 53'	Stadium: Dr. Constantin Rădulescu Stadium; Attendance: 2,884; Referee: Adrian Cojocaru

2 August 2025 4	CFR Cluj	2–3	CSU Craiova	Cluj-Napoca
21:30	Ilie 64', 73'	Report	Nsimba 20', 55'; Rădulescu 45'	Stadium: Dr. Constantin Rădulescu Stadium; Referee: Rareș Vidican

9 August 2025 5	Csíkszereda	v	CFR Cluj

16 August 2025 6	CFR Cluj	3–3	FC Botoșani	Cluj-Napoca
	Emërllahu 19'; Cordea 42'; Korenica 79'	Report	Kovtalyuk 36'; Šuta 54'; Mailat 82'	Stadium: Dr. Constantin Rădulescu Stadium

24 August 2025 7	CFR Cluj	1–4	ASC Oțelul Galați	Galați

31 August 2025 8	CFR Cluj	2–2	FCSB	Cluj-Napoca
21:30 UTC+3	Đoković 19'; Emërllahu 45+1'	Report	Tănase 43' (pen.); Cisotti 87'	Stadium: Dr. Constantin Rădulescu Stadium; Referee: Sebastian Colțescu

13 September 2025 9	Metaloglobus București	1–1	CFR Cluj	Clinceni
21:30 UTC+3	Huiban 4' (pen.)	Report	Korenica 37' (pen.)	Stadium: Clinceni Stadium; Referee: Andrei Moroita

21 September 2025 10	Arad	1–1	CFR Cluj	Cluj-Napoca
TBD	Marcus Coco 50' (o.g.)	Report	Lorenzo Biliboc 60'	Stadium: Dr. Constantin Rădulescu Stadium; Attendance: TBD; Referee: TBD

29 September 2025 11	U Cluj	2–2	CFR Cluj	Cluj
TBD	TBD	Report	TBD	Stadium: TBD; Attendance: 14,066; Referee: Marian Barbu

5 October 2025 12	Hermannstadt	1–2	CFR Cluj	Cluj-Napoca
		Report

16 October 2025 5	Miercurea Ciuc	2–2	CFR Cluj	Miercurea Ciuc
		Report		Stadium: Stadionul Municipal Miercurea Ciuc

20 October 2025 13	Petrolul	1–0	CFR Cluj
		Report

25 October 2025 14	Farul	2–0	CFR Cluj	Cluj-Napoca
		Report

31 October 2025 15	Dinamo	2–1	CFR Cluj	Cluj-Napoca

=== Supercupa României ===
5 July 2025 Final	FCSB	2–1	CFR Cluj	Bucharest
20:00 UTC+3	Politic 49'; Radunović 90+1'	Report	Fică 65'	Stadium: Steaua Stadium; Attendance: 20,133; Referee: Marian Barbu

=== Europa League ===
==== First qualifying round ====
10 July 2025 First leg	(Hungary) Paksi FC	0–0	(Romania) CFR Cluj	Paks, Hungary
19:00		Report		Stadium: Fehérvári úti Stadion; Attendance: 3,916; Referee: Pavle Ilić

17 July 2025 Second leg	(Romania) CFR Cluj	3–0 (3–0 agg.)	(Hungary) Paksi FC	Cluj-Napoca, Romania
20:30	Fică 35'; Munteanu 85'; Muhar 90'	Report		Stadium: Dr. Constantin Rădulescu Stadium; Attendance: 6,512; Referee: Kyriakos Athanasio

==== Second qualifying round ====
24 July 2025 First leg	(Switzerland) Lugano	0–0	(Romania) CFR Cluj	Thun, Switzerland
20:30				Stadium: Stockhorn Arena; Attendance: 941; Referee: Darren England

31 July 2025 Second leg	(Romania) CFR Cluj	1–0 (a.e.t.) (1–0 agg.)	(Switzerland) Lugano	Cluj-Napoca, Romania
20:30	Sinyan 96'			Stadium: Dr. Constantin Rădulescu Stadium; Attendance: 8,564; Referee: Allard Lindhout

==== Third qualifying round ====
7 August 2025 First leg	(Romania) CFR Cluj	1–2	(Portugal) Braga	Cluj-Napoca, Romania
19:30	Sinyan 29'		Gorby 17', 60'	Stadium: Dr. Constantin Rădulescu Stadium; Attendance: 10,383; Referee: Elchin Masiyev

14 August 2025 Second leg	(Portugal) Braga	2–0 (4–1 agg.)	(Romania) CFR Cluj	Braga, Portugal
	Zalazar 19', 45+4'			Stadium: Estádio Municipal de Braga

=== Conference League ===
==== Play-off round ====
21 August 2025 First leg	(Sweden) Häcken	7–2	(Romania) CFR Cluj	Gothenburg, Sweden
	Gustafson 2', 34'; Andersen 18'; Svanbäck 24'; Brusberg 49'; Dembe 61', 70'		Korenica 38'; Cordea 50'	Stadium: Bravida Arena

28 August 2025 Second leg	CFR Cluj (Romania)	1–0 (3–7 agg.)	(Sweden) Häcken	Dr. Constantin Rădulescu Stadium, Cluj-Napoca
19:30 (20:30 UTC+3)	Păun 48'	Report		Attendance: 3,321; Referee: Sebastian Gishamer (Austria)
