= Simon Gustafson =

Swedish footballer

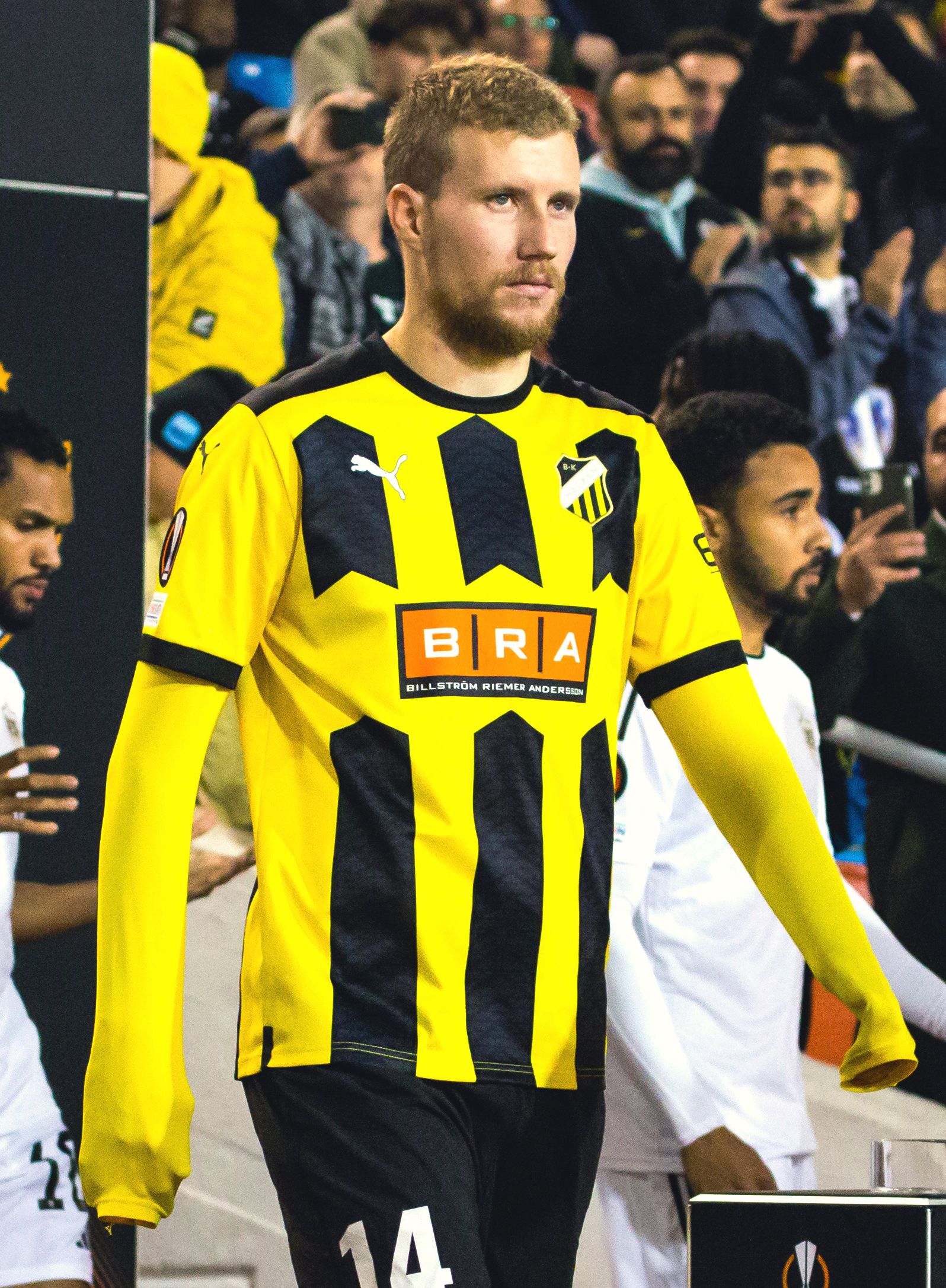
- Gustafson with BK Häcken in 2023

Personal information
- Full name: Simon Gustafson
- Date of birth: 11 January 1995 (age 31)
- Place of birth: Mölndal, Sweden
- Height: 1.85 m (6 ft 1 in)
- Position: Attacking midfielder

Team information
- Current team: Korona Kielce
- Number: 86

Youth career
- Fässbergs IF

Senior career*
Years	Team	Apps	(Gls)
2010–2012	Fässbergs IF	47	(13)
2013–2015	Häcken	68	(14)
2015–2018	Feyenoord	17	(3)
2017–2018	→ Roda JC Kerkrade (loan)	33	(10)
2018–2022	FC Utrecht	96	(19)
2022–2025	Häcken	75	(10)
2026–	Korona Kielce	17	(1)

International career
2012–2014	Sweden U19	10	(2)
2013–2015	Sweden U21	9	(3)
2015	Sweden	2	(0)
Medal record
Men's football
Representing Sweden
UEFA European Under-21 Championship
Winner	2015 Czech Republic
- * Club domestic league appearances and goals as of 12:35, 13 September 2026 (UTC)

Simon Gustafson (born 11 January 1995) is a Swedish professional footballer who plays as a midfielder for Ekstraklasa club Korona Kielce.

== Career ==
In July 2015, Gustafson joined Feyenoord on a four-year contract. Feyenoord reportedly paid a £1 million transfer fee for Gustafson, who had made two appearances for the Sweden national team. He was loaned to Roda JC for the remainder of the 2017–18 season on 14 July 2017.

On 16 July 2022, Gustafson returned to Häcken and signed a contract until the end of 2025, reuniting with his twin brother Samuel.

On 19 January 2026, Gustafson signed for Polish Ekstraklasa club Korona Kielce on a deal until June 2027.

== Personal life ==
He is the twin brother of Samuel Gustafson.

== Career statistics ==
=== Club ===
As of match played 23 May 2026

Appearances and goals by club, season and competition
Club	Season	League			National cup (Note: Includes Svenska Cupen, KNVB Cup)		Europe		Other		Total	
Club	Season	Division	Apps	Goals	Apps	Goals	Apps	Goals	Apps	Goals	Apps	Goals
Häcken	2013	Allsvenskan	26	2	2	0	4 (Note: Appearances in UEFA Europa League)	0	—		32	2
Häcken	2014	Allsvenskan	28	10	4	1	—		—		32	11
Häcken	2015	Allsvenskan	14	2	4	4	—		—		18	6
Häcken	Total		68	14	10	5	4	0	—		82	19
Feyenoord	2015–16	Eredivisie	15	3	2	0	—		—		17	3
Feyenoord	2016–17	Eredivisie	2	0	2	0	0	0	0	0	4	0
Feyenoord	Total		17	3	4	0	0	0	0	0	21	3
Roda JC Kerkrade (loan)	2017–18	Eredivisie	33	10	4	1	—		2 (Note: Appearances in Eredivisie promotion/relegation play-offs)	0	39	11
Utrecht	2018–19	Eredivisie	33	8	2	0	—		4 (Note: Appearances in Eredivisie European play-offs)	3	39	11
Utrecht	2019–20	Eredivisie	23	6	4	2	2	1	—		29	9
Utrecht	2020–21	Eredivisie	20	2	0	0	—		2	1	22	3
Utrecht	2021–22	Eredivisie	20	3	0	0	—		2	1	22	4
Utrecht	Total		96	19	6	2	2	1	8	5	112	27
Häcken	2022	Allsvenskan	14	0	4	2	—		—		18	2
Häcken	2023	Allsvenskan	11	0	0	0	3	0	—		14	0
Häcken	2024	Allsvenskan	28	6	6	0	6 (Note: Appearances in UEFA Conference League)	2	—		40	8
Häcken	2025	Allsvenskan	22	4	1	1	14 (Note: Six appearances and two goals in UEFA Europa League, eight appearances and two goals in UEFA Conference League)	2	—		37	7
Häcken	Total		75	10	11	3	23	4	—		109	17
Korona Kielce	2025–26	Ekstraklasa	14	0	—		—		—		14	0
Career total			303	56	35	11	29	5	10	5	377	77

=== International ===
Appearances and goals by national team and year
National team	Year	Apps	Goals
Sweden
Sweden	2015	2	0
Total		2	0

== Honours ==
Feyenoord

- Eredivisie: 2016–17
- KNVB Cup: 2015–16

BK Häcken

- Allsvenskan: 2022
- Svenska Cupen: 2022–23, 2024–25

Sweden U21

- UEFA European Under-21 Championship: 2015
