= Harry Hilvenius =

Swedish footballer (born 2007)

Personal information
- Full name: Harry Joachim Hilvenius
- Date of birth: 6 October 2007 (age 19)
- Height: 1.87 m (6 ft 2 in)
- Position: Centre-back

Team information
- Current team: BK Häcken
- Number: 13

Youth career
- –2022: Onsala BK
- 2023–2025: BK Häcken

Senior career*
Years	Team	Apps	(Gls)
2025–	BK Häcken	25	(1)

International career^{‡}
2023–2024	Sweden U17	12	(0)
2024–2026	Sweden U19	17	(0)
2026–	Sweden U21	1	(0)
- * Club domestic league appearances and goals as of 17 August 2026 ‡ National team caps and goals as of 17 August 2026

Harry Joachim Hilvenius (born 6 October 2007) is a Swedish footballer who plays as a centre-back for BK Häcken.

== Career ==
Hilvenius hails from Onsala and played for Onsala BK from the age of six until he joined BK Häcken's academy ahead of the 2023 season. He made his international debut for Sweden U16 in a double fixture against Estonia U16 in August and September 2023. The next year he took part in the 2024 UEFA European Under-17 Championship, but the team was knocked out in the group stage.

He made his Allsvenskan debut against Sirius in May 2025, followed by his European debut in the 2025–26 UEFA Europa League qualifying and the 2025–26 UEFA Conference League. He was officially included in the senior squad when signing a five-year contract in October 2025.

Hilvenius was praised for his performances during the spring of 2026. According to manager Jens Gustafsson, the 18-year old had made 2 mistakes in 7 matches. Hilvenius made his debut for Sweden U21 in June 2026, still only aged 18. He scored his first Allsvenskan goal in August 2026, converting a corner kick with a header, and securing one point against lowly Kalmar FF. Expressen reported transfer interest from Serie A clubs.
