= Jens Gustafsson =

Swedish footballer and manager (born 1978)

Personal information
- Full name: Jens Otto Andreas Gustafsson
- Date of birth: 15 October 1978 (age 48)
- Place of birth: Helsingborg, Sweden
- Height: 1.82 m (6 ft 0 in)
- Position: Defender

Team information
- Current team: BK Häcken (manager)

Youth career
- Helsingborgs IF

Senior career*
| Years | Team | Apps | (Gls) |
| 2001 | IK Brage | 27 | (0) |
| 2002 | Högaborgs BK | | |
| 2003–2009 | Falkenbergs FF | 193 | (4) |
| Total | | 220 | (4) |

Managerial career
- 2011–2014: Halmstads BK
- 2015: Sweden U21
- 2016–2020: IFK Norrköping
- 2021: Hajduk Split
- 2022: Sweden U21
- 2022–2024: Pogoń Szczecin
- 2024: Al-Fateh
- 2025–: BK Häcken
- * Club domestic league appearances and goals

Jens Otto Andreas Gustafsson (born 15 October 1978) is a Swedish professional football manager and former player who played as a defender. He is the current manager of BK Häcken.

== Managerial career ==
On 28 May 2021, Gustafsson was named the new manager of Croatian Prva HNL side Hajduk Split. He signed a two-year contract, with the option of extending for a further one year. Gustafsson arrived at Hajduk after holding the position as manager for four and a half years at Allsvenskan club IFK Norrköping.

Gustafsson rejoined the Swedish national under-21 team at the beginning of 2022. On 9 May 2022, it was announced his contract had been bought out by Polish club Pogoń Szczecin, and he replaced Kosta Runjaić as team manager at the start of the 2022–23 season. In charge of Pogoń in 87 official matches, Gustafsson led the club to back-to-back fourth-place finishes in the league, as well as the 2023–24 Polish Cup final. On 15 August 2024, Pogoń announced they have agreed to part ways with Gustafsson after he accepted an offer from an unnamed Saudi Pro League club.

On 22 August 2024, Gustafsson was appointed as manager of Saudi Arabian club Al-Fateh. During his tenure, Al-Fateh recorded one win in thirteen games across all competitions, before agreeing to mutually part with Gustafsson on 4 December 2024. He was announced by BK Häcken on 27 December 2024.

== Managerial statistics ==
As of 4 December 2024

Managerial record by team and tenure
| Team | From | To | Record | | | | |
| Team | From | To | G | W | D | L | Win % |
|---|---|---|---|---|---|---|---|
| Halmstads BK | 5 July 2011 | 20 November 2014 | 118 | 44 | 26 | 48 | 37.29 |
| Sweden U21 | 10 March 2015 | 31 December 2015 | 16 | 9 | 6 | 1 | 56.25 |
| IFK Norrköping | 1 June 2016 | 31 December 2020 | 170 | 94 | 39 | 37 | 55.29 |
| Hadjuk Split | 28 May 2021 | 1 November 2021 | 17 | 9 | 3 | 5 | 52.94 |
| Sweden U21 | 13 January 2022 | 9 May 2022 | 1 | 0 | 0 | 1 | 0.00 |
| Pogoń Szczecin | 13 June 2022 | 15 August 2024 | 87 | 44 | 18 | 25 | 50.57 |
| Al-Fateh | 22 August 2024 | 4 December 2024 | 13 | 1 | 2 | 10 | 7.69 |
| Total | | | 422 | 201 | 94 | 127 | 47.63 |

== Honours ==
=== Managerial ===
BK Häcken

- Svenska Cupen: 2024–25

Individual

- Ekstraklasa Coach of the Month: October 2023, February 2024
