= Samuel Leach Holm =

Swedish footballer (born 1997)

Personal information
- Full name: Samuel Ruben Leach Holm
- Date of birth: 9 October 1997 (age 29)
- Place of birth: Sweden
- Height: 1.84 m (6 ft 0 in)
- Position: Midfielder

Team information
- Current team: Fredrikstad
- Number: 6

Youth career
- IFK Österåker
- –2015: Djurgårdens IF

Senior career*
Years	Team	Apps	(Gls)
2016–2017	Åtvidabergs FF	20	(1)
2017–2019	Sollentuna FK	37	(13)
2019–2020	Västerås SK	14	(1)
2019	→ Sollentuna FK (loan)	12	(1)
2020	Dalkurd FF	13	(2)
2021–2023	IF Brommapojkarna	87	(10)
2024	Djurgårdens IF	16	(2)
2024–2026	BK Häcken	38	(5)
2026–	Fredrikstad	11	(1)

International career^{‡}
2014	Sweden U19	3	(0)
2024	Sweden	1	(0)
- * Club domestic league appearances and goals as of 23 July 2026 ‡ National team caps and goals as of 23:39, 12 January 2024 (UTC)

Samuel Ruben Leach Holm (born 9 October 1997) is a Swedish professional footballer playing for Fredrisktad in the Eliteserien.

== Club career ==
He hails from Åkersberga.

He was named Midfielder of the Year in the 2022 Superettan.

In early 2026, Holm was picked up by Norwegian Eliteserien side Fredrikstad on a three-year contract.

== International career ==
Leach Holm made his full international debut for the Sweden national team on 12 January 2024 in a friendly game against Estonia which Sweden won 2–1.

== Personal life ==
Leach Holm was born in Sweden to a Jewish family, and holds Swedish-Israeli dual citizenship.

== Career statistics ==
=== International ===
Appearances and goals by national team and year
National team	Year	Apps	Goals
Sweden	2024	1	0
Total		1	0

== Honours ==
BK Häcken

- Svenska Cupen: 2024–25

== See also ==
- List of select Jewish football players
