= Silas Andersen =

Danish footballer (born 2004)

Personal information
- Full name: Silas Sinan Erhen Thorup Andersen
- Date of birth: 13 June 2004 (age 22)
- Place of birth: Copenhagen, Denmark
- Height: 1.90 m (6 ft 3 in)
- Position: Midfielder

Team information
- Current team: Sporting CP
- Number: 4

Youth career
- –2018: Sundby BK
- 2018–2021: Copenhagen
- 2021–2023: Inter Milan

Senior career*
Years	Team	Apps	(Gls)
2023–2025	Utrecht	2	(0)
2023–2025	→ Jong Utrecht	46	(3)
2025–2026	BK Häcken	35	(3)
2026–	Sporting CP	6	(0)

International career^{‡}
2019–2020	Denmark U16	10	(1)
2020	Denmark U17	1	(0)
2021–2022	Denmark U18	10	(1)
2022–2023	Denmark U19	7	(1)
2023–2024	Denmark U20	9	(2)
2025–2026	Denmark U21	10	(2)
- * Club domestic league appearances and goals as of 9 October 2026 ‡ National team caps and goals as of 01:53, 1 November 2026 (UTC)

Silas Sinan Erhen Thorup Andersen (born 13 June 2004) is a Danish footballer who plays as a midfielder for Portuguese club Sporting CP.

== Early life ==
Andersen joined the youth academy of Italian Serie A side Inter Milan at the age of seventeen.

== Club career ==
On 30 January 2025, Andersen signed a four-year contract with BK Häcken in Sweden. In March 2026 Andersen was in talks to sign with Wolverhampton.

== International career ==
He is therefore eligible to represent Turkey and Denmark internationally.

Andersen played for the Denmark national under-19 football team, where he was regarded as one of the team's most important players.

== Style of play ==
Andersen mainly operates as a midfielder and has been described as "good running and more than decent insertion skills, he has yet to find a role and a defined tactical position".

== Personal life ==
Andersen was born in the Copenhagen, Denmark to a Turkish father and a Danish mother.

Andersen has regarded Netherlands international Frenkie de Jong, France international Paul Pogba, and Croatia international Luka Modric as his football idols.

== Career statistics ==
=== Club ===
As of match played 3 November 2026

Club	Season	League			Cup (Note: Includes KNVB Cup, Svenska Cupen, Taça de Portugal)		Continental		Other		Total	
Club	Season	Division	Apps	Goals	Apps	Goals	Apps	Goals	Apps	Goal	Apps	Goal
Jong Utrecht	2023–24	Eerste Divisie	30	1	—		—		—		30	1
Jong Utrecht	2024–25	Eerste Divisie	16	2	—		—		—		16	2
Jong Utrecht	Total		46	3	—		—		—		46	3
FC Utrecht	2023–24	Eredivisie	1	0	—		—		—		1	0
FC Utrecht	2024–25	Eredivisie	1	0	0	0	—		—		1	0
FC Utrecht	Total		2	0	0	0	—		—		2	0
BK Häcken	2025	Allsvenskan	26	2	6	1	13 (Note: Five appearances in UEFA Europa League, eight appearances and two goals in UEFA Conference League)	2	—		45	5
BK Häcken	2026	Allsvenskan	9	3	3	1	—		—		12	4
BK Häcken	Total		35	5	9	2	13	2	—		57	9
Sporting CP	2026–27	Primeira Liga	8	0	0	0	3 (Note: Appearances in UEFA Champions League)	0	1 (Note: Appearances in Taça da Liga)	0	12	0
Career total			91	8	9	2	13	2	1	0	117	12

== Honours ==
BK Häcken

- Svenska Cupen: 2024–25
