= Isak Brusberg =

Swedish footballer (born 2005)

Personal information
- Full name: Isak Oliver Brusberg
- Date of birth: 5 September 2006 (age 20)
- Place of birth: Gothenburg, Sweden
- Height: 1.88 m (6 ft 2 in)
- Position: Forward

Team information
- Current team: Raków Częstochowa
- Number: 39

Youth career
- –2022: Backatorp IF
- 2023: Häcken

Senior career*
Years	Team	Apps	(Gls)
2023–2026	Häcken	22	(4)
2026–	Raków Częstochowa	8	(0)

International career^{‡}
2023–2024	Sweden U19	8	(0)
- * Club domestic league appearances and goals as of 21:34, 28 August 2026 (UTC) ‡ National team caps and goals as of 22 August 2025

Isak Oliver Brusberg (born 5 September 2006) is a Swedish professional footballer who plays as a forward for Ekstraklasa club Raków Częstochowa.

== Club career ==
Brusberg hails from Hisings Backa and played youth football for Backatorp IF until 2023, when he joined the academy of Häcken. In the same year, he made his Allsvenskan debut. In October 2023, Brusberg officially signed a senior contract with Häcken, lasting until the end of 2026. However, he sat out 2024 due to injury and did not play a single match.

Brusberg's first start came in the 2025 Allsvenskan, as the team struggled with injuries in the squad. Brusberg scored against GAIS in a Gothenburg derby in June 2025, then against Halmstad in July.

During Häcken's 2025 spell in Europe, Brusberg scored with a chip in the first minute against Brann in the Europa League third qualifying round at home - the goal was however disallowed by VAR. With Häcken being relegated to the Conference League play-off round, Brusberg scored in a 7–2 routing of CFR Cluj.

On 21 January 2026, Brusberg joined Polish Ekstraklasa club Raków Częstochowa, signing a contract until the end of 2030.

== International career ==
Brusberg made his debut for Sweden U17 against Denmark at a U17 four-nation tournament in September 2023, and played continuously for six months, including a U18 three-nation tournament in March 2024.

== Honours ==
Häcken

- Svenska Cupen: 2024–25
