= Gabriel Wallentin =

Swedish footballer (born 1998)

Personal information
- Full name: Gabriel Carl Wallentin
- Date of birth: 3 April 2001 (age 25)
- Height: 1.89 m (6 ft 2 in)
- Position: Central defender

Team information
- Current team: Halmstads BK
- Number: 3

Youth career
- Trönninge IF
- –2020: Halmstads BK

Senior career*
Years	Team	Apps	(Gls)
2021	Halmstads BK	43	(3)
2021–2022	→ Skövde AIK (loan)	40	(0)

International career
2016	Sweden U15	4	(0)
2018	Sweden U17	3	(0)
- * Club domestic league appearances and goals as of 26 December 2024

Gabriel Wallentin (born 3 April 2001) is a Swedish footballer who plays as a central defender for Halmstads BK in Allsvenskan.

== Career ==
Wallentin started his youth career in Trönninge IF, before joining Halmstads BK at a young age. He also made his youth international debut for Sweden U15 against Finland U15.

Wallentin was loaned out to Skövde AIK in 2021, where he was regarded by Expressen as the prime young talent of the squad. After helping Skövde win promotion from the 2021 Ettan, the loan was prolonged for the 2022 season as well. Meanwhile, Halmstad were promoted from the 2022 Superettan.

Wallentin returned to Halmstad and made his Allsvenskan debut on 2 April 2023 against AIK. Halmstad surprisingly won 2–1. He scored his first Allsvenskan goal two weeks later, with Halmstad beating Djurgården 2–0 and remaining unbeaten after starting the 2023 Allsvenskan campaign against two of Sweden's biggest teams.

In his third Allsvenskan match, however, Wallentin received two yellow cards in only four minutes, and also caused a penalty kick with the latter transgression. Wallentin also received another red card against AIK in November 2024, after which he was criticized for dangerous play.

In 2024, Wallentin played more than the previous year, starting 25 of 30 games, and attributing his development to extra strength training sessions.
