= John Paul Dembe =

Ugandan footballer

Personal information
- Date of birth: 3 July 2005 (age 21)
- Place of birth: Uganda
- Height: 1.91 m (6 ft 3 in)
- Position: Forward

Team information
- Current team: SK Sigma Olomouc
- Number: 17

Youth career
- KCCA

Senior career*
Years	Team	Apps	(Gls)
2023	KCCA		
2023–2026	Häcken	26	(4)
2024	→ Oddevold (loan)	3	(0)
2026–	Sigma Olomouc	3	(0)

International career
2023–	Uganda U20	3	
- * Club domestic league appearances and goals as of 22 September 2026

John Paul Dembe (born 3 July 2005) is a Ugandan professional footballer who plays as a centre-forward for the Czech First League club SK Sigma Olomouc. He previously played for KCCA FC in Uganda and BK Häcken in Sweden. He has also represented Uganda at youth level.

== Early life ==
Dembe was born in Uganda. He developed through the youth system of KCCA FC where he established himself as a promising attacking talent.

== Club career ==
=== KCCA FC ===
Dembe came through the youth ranks of KCCA FC and joined the club's reserve team in 2022. In July 2023, he was promoted to the senior team and signed a five-year contract with the club.

John Paul Dembe in 2025

=== BK Häcken ===
In July 2023, Dembe joined Swedish club BK Häcken on a six-month loan from KCCA FC. He initially featured primarily for the club's under-19 side, scoring 10 goals in eight matches in the Swedish U19 Allsvenskan. Dembe made his senior debut for BK Häcken in the UEFA Europa League against Molde FK on 9 November 2023, coming on as a substitute late in the match. BK Häcken subsequently signed him permanently. He made his first appearance in the Allsvenskan, Sweden's top division, during the 2024 season. In February 2025, Dembe scored his first goal for BK Häcken in a 4–1 victory over Helsingborgs IF. On 6 July 2025, Dembe scored twice in a 2–0 away victory over IF Elfsborg in the Allsvenskan, recording his first league goals for the club. He finished the 2025 Allsvenskan season with four goals in 24 appearances.

=== SK Sigma Olomouc ===
In January 2026, Dembe transferred from BK Häcken to Czech club SK Sigma Olomouc, moving to the Czech top flight. BK Häcken stated that he left the club after two and a half years and had made 55 appearances and scored 12 goals for the club in all competitions. After his 1.5 million Euro transfer, Dembe suffered from injury and did not play for Olomouc during the 2025–26 season. He made his league debut for the club on 2 August 2026 in a 2–2 home draw against FK Mladá Boleslav.

== International career ==
Dembe represented Uganda at under-20 level. He was selected for Uganda's squad at the 2023 Africa U-20 Cup of Nations in Egypt. He scored in Uganda's opening match of the tournament, a 2–1 victory over the Central African Republic U20. Uganda reached the quarter-finals, where they were eliminated by Nigeria. Dembe also represented Uganda in the 2024 CECAFA U-20 Championship, where he scored four goals and helped Uganda reach the semi-finals.

== Career statistics ==
As of 31 December 2025

Club	Season	League	Apps	Goals
BK Häcken	2024	Allsvenskan	2	0
BK Häcken	2025	Allsvenskan	24	4
IK Oddevold (loan)	2024	Superettan	3	0
BK Häcken	2025	UEFA Europa League / UEFA Conference League	—	—

== Honours ==
=== KCCA FC U20 ===
- Cambiasso U20 International Tournament: 2022

=== BK Häcken ===
- Svenska Cupen: 2024–25
