= Mikkel Rygaard =

Danish footballer (born 1990)

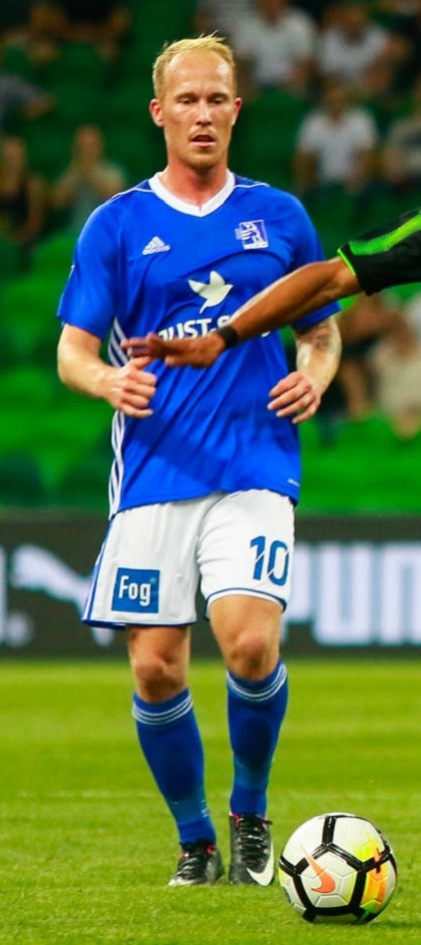
- Rygaard with Lyngby in 2017

Personal information
- Full name: Mikkel Rygaard Jensen
- Date of birth: 25 December 1990 (age 35)
- Place of birth: Nykøbing Falster, Denmark
- Height: 1.76 m (5 ft 9 in)
- Position: Attacking midfielder

Team information
- Current team: BK Häcken
- Number: 10

Youth career
- Nykøbing Falster Alliancen
- 2005–2007: Herfølge
- 2007–2008: Charlton Athletic

Senior career*
Years	Team	Apps	(Gls)
2006–2007	Herfølge	7	(0)
2007–2009	Charlton Athletic	0	(0)
2009	Herfølge	2	(0)
2009–2010	HB Køge	3	(0)
2010	B.1921	12	(13)
2010–2012	Lolland Falster Alliancen	62	(17)
2012–2016	Næstved	115	(38)
2016–2018	Lyngby	61	(10)
2018–2020	Nordsjælland	86	(12)
2021	ŁKS Łódź	29	(2)
2022–	BK Häcken	117	(26)

International career^{‡}
2008	Denmark U18	4	(0)
2009	Denmark U19	4	(0)
2009	Denmark U20	3	(0)
- * Club domestic league appearances and goals as of 8 July 2026 ‡ National team caps and goals as of 11 November 2019

Mikkel Rygaard Jensen (Danish pronunciation: [ˈʁyˌkɒˀ]; born 25 December 1990) is a Danish professional footballer who plays as an attacking midfielder for Allsvenskan club BK Häcken.

After starting his career as a talent of Herfølge and later Football League Championship club Charlton Athletic, Rygaard played multiple season in the lower divisions of Danish football. Most notable was his stint at Næstved, where he made 155 appearances and scored 38 competitive goals which earned him a "Player of the Year" Award of the Danish 2nd Divisions in 2014. In January 2016, Rygaard signed for Lyngby in the Danish 1st Division, and helped the team win promotion to the Danish Superliga the same year. His performances earned him the 2016 Danish 1st Division "Player of the Year" award. In February 2018, Rygaard joined FC Nordsjælland on a free transfer as economically troubled Lyngby failed to pay player salaries. After a short stint with Polish club ŁKS Łódź, he moved to Swedish side BK Häcken in December 2021.

Rygaard has also made international appearances for Denmark at U18, U19 and U20-level.

== Club career ==
=== Early years ===
Born in Nykøbing Falster, Rygaard began his youth career at local side Nykøbing Falster Alliancen before transferring to the academy of Herfølge BK in 2005. After progressing through the youth ranks, he was invited for a trial at Football League Championship club Charlton Athletic after they had previously signed fellow Herfølge-talent, Martin Christensen. The trial eventually resulted in a two-year contract with the English club, and Rygaard was placed in the Charlton U18 team for his first season. During his time at Charlton, Rygaard played two friendly matches for the first team under head coach Alan Pardew.

=== Return to Denmark ===
On 30 January 2009, after one and a half season in Charlton, Rygaard returned to Herfølge, despite having an offer to play for Sparta Prague. On 3 December 2009, Rygaard was notified by general manager, Per Rud, and head coach, Auri, that his contract, running to July 2010, would not be extended and that they would listen to offers from other clubs during the winter transfer window. After failing to find a new club, he left the club by mutual agreement in March 2010.

After his contract was terminated, Rygaard started playing as an amateur for non-league side B.1921 while having a job on the side. After scoring 13 goals in 12 appearances for B.1921 he was signed on a two-year deal by his first youth club, now called Lolland Falster Alliancen, who played in the Danish 2nd Divisions. Eventually, he earned a semi-professional contract at LFA, playing regularly throughout two seasons and becoming a profile on the team.

Rygaard signed with Næstved BK in the summer of 2012. He was awarded the Danish 2nd Divisions Player of the Year Award in 2014 for his performances. Rygaard played for the club for three and a half years, making 115 appearances in which he scored 38 goals.

=== Lyngby ===
Rygaard's impressive performances for Næstved in the first months after their promotion to the Danish 1st Division resulted in interest from clubs in the top table of the 1st Division, as well as from clubs in the Danish Superliga. On 26 January 2016, he joined Lyngby BK. His first year in the club was highly successful, winning the 2016 Danish 1st Division Player of the Year Award and Lyngby reaching promotion to the Superliga. In the following season, Lyngby surprisingly ended in third place of the league table, securing qualification to the first qualifying round of the next year's UEFA Europa League.

At Lyngby, he made his European debut in the first qualifying round of the 2017–18 UEFA Europa League at home against Welsh club Bangor City, starting in midfield before being substituted at halftime. After knocking out the club 4–0 on aggregate, Lyngby defeated Slovak side Slovan Bratislava in the second round, with Rygaard scoring in the return leg on a penalty – his first European goal. Lyngby were ultimately knocked out in the third qualifying round by Russian club FC Krasnodar, losing 5–2 on aggregate. During a tumultuous 2017–18 Superliga campaign, where Lyngby fought relegation and their financial situation worsened, Rygaard left the club after not receiving his salary for seven days in February.

=== Nordsjælland ===
On 12 February 2018, Rygaard joined Nordsjælland on a three-and-a-half-year contract. He made his debut for the club four days later, scoring the second goal in a 2–1 home win over OB in the Superliga.

After Nordsjælland finished in third place of the 2018–19 Danish Superliga, the club qualified for the UEFA Europa League, entering the tournament in the first qualifying round. For the second time in his career, Rygaard advanced to the third qualifying round of the tournament, this time after wins over Northern Irish club Cliftonville and Swedish side AIK. This time, Serbian club Partizan stood in the way of advancement, as Nordsjælland lost 5–2 on aggregate.

Having grown out to become a key player at the club, Rygaard finished his three-year stint with the club with 97 appearances, in which he recorded 13 goals and 19 assists.

=== ŁKS Łódź ===
Rygaard signed a three-and-a-half-year contract with Polish second-tier I liga club ŁKS Łódź on 25 December 2020; his 30th birthday. He would join the team from January 2021. He made his debut on 9 February in a 3–2 loss to Legia Warsaw in the Polish Cup. He made his league debut on 20 February in a 3–0 loss to GKS Tychy. Rygaard scored his first goal for the club on 27 March in a 2–1 away loss to Sandecja Nowy Sącz.

He cancelled his contract unilaterally on 3 November 2021, after numerous missed payments by the club.

=== BK Häcken ===
Rygaard signed a two-year contract with Allsvenskan club BK Häcken on 30 December 2021. He made his competitive debut for the club on 20 February 2022 in an emphatic 13–0 away win over Ytterhogdals IK in Svenska Cupen. He made his first Allsvenskan appearance on 2 April, the first matchday of the season, starting in a 4–2 home victory against AIK. His first goal for the club came on 9 May, opening the score in Häcken's 2–1 away win over IFK Värnamo. He established himself as a consistent performer, and by the end of the season, he had played for BK Häcken 31 times in all competitions, scoring 11 goals and providing four assists, helping them to their first ever Allsvenskan title. He was voted Allsvenskan Midfielder of the Season at the end of the season.

== International career ==
Rygaard is a former Danish youth international, making several appearances on under-18, under-19 and under-20 level.

== Honours ==
BK Häcken

- Allsvenskan: 2022
- Svenska Cupen: 2022–23, 2024–25

Individual

- Allsvenskan Midfielder of the Season: 2022
