= Pontus Dahbo =

Swedish footballer (born 2005)

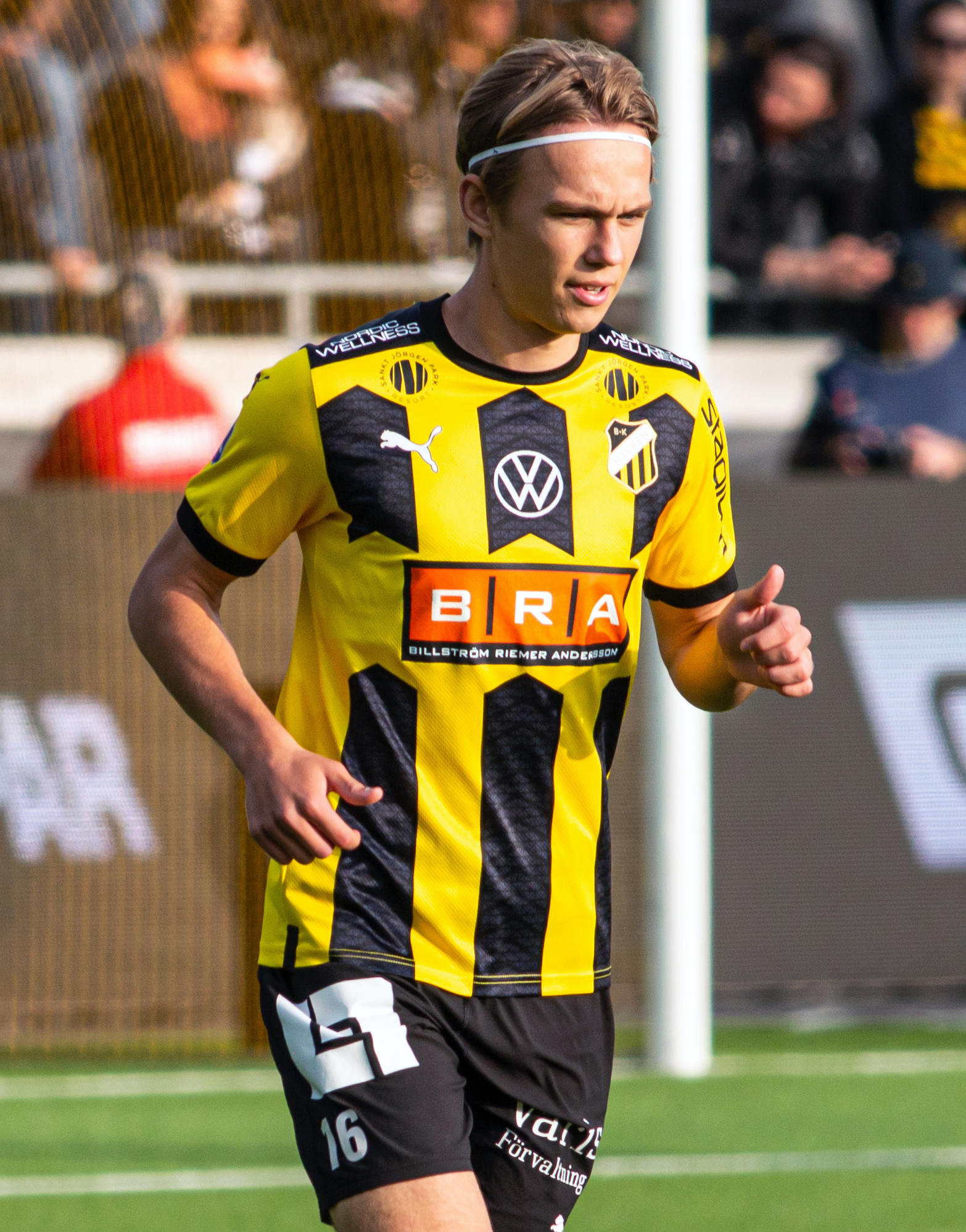

Personal information
- Full name: Pontus Bror Harry Dahbo
- Date of birth: 11 October 2005 (age 21)
- Height: 1.85 m (6 ft 1 in)
- Position: Midfielder

Team information
- Current team: Vitesse (on loan from BK Häcken)
- Number: 16

Youth career
- 2011–2019: Sävedalens IF
- 2020–2022: BK Häcken

Senior career*
Years	Team	Apps	(Gls)
2023–	BK Häcken	77	(5)
2026–	→ Vitesse (loan)	3	(0)

International career^{‡}
2021	Sweden U17	3	(0)
2022–2024	Sweden U19	14	(2)
2024–2025	Sweden U21	6	(0)
- * Club domestic league appearances and goals as of 12:39, 16 September 2026 (UTC) ‡ National team caps and goals as of 09:38, 21 June 2025 (UTC)

Pontus Bror Harry Dahbo (born 11 October 2005) is a Swedish professional footballer who plays as a midfielder for Eerste Divisie club Vitesse, on loan from Allsvenskan club BK Häcken.

== Career ==
He hails from Sävedalen and played children's football in Sävedalens IF from age 6 to 15. Dahbo then joined BK Häcken's academy. He made his youth international debut in October 2021.

Following BK Häcken's victory in the 2022 Allsvenskan, the decision was made to draft Dahbo into the senior team already in November 2022. He made his debut in the 2022-23 Svenska Cupen in February 2023, then his Allsvenskan debut on 3 April 2023 against Elfsborg – and his European debut during the 2023-24 UEFA Champions League qualifying and the 2023-24 UEFA Europa League group stage. His first Allsvenskan goal came in the Gothenburg derby against IFK Göteborg, where Dahbo helped Häcken emerge victorious. He made another breakthrough in the season's penultimate game, where he scored two goals against Malmö FF, thwarting MFF's chance to win Allsvenskan and also giving Häcken a shot at overtaking MFF and finishing runners-up.

On 14 August 2026, Dahbo joined Eerste Divisie club Vitesse on a one-year loan with an option to buy.

== Personal life ==
He is a son of Patrik Dahbo. His father managed Jonsereds IF who met Häcken in the 2023-24 Svenska Cupen. Pontus Dahbo scored two goals to eliminate Jonsered.

== Honours ==
=== BK Häcken ===
- Svenska Cupen: 2023
