= Olle Samuelsson =

Swedish footballer (born 2004)

Personal information
- Full name: Olle Julius Samuelsson
- Date of birth: 16 May 2004 (age 22)
- Height: 1.90 m (6 ft 3 in)
- Position: Centre-back

Team information
- Current team: BK Häcken
- Number: 23

Youth career
- –2023: Kalmar FF

Senior career*
Years	Team	Apps	(Gls)
2024	Oskarshamns AIK	28	(1)
2025	Sandvikens IF	13	(0)
2025–	BK Häcken	19	(0)

International career^{‡}
2025–2026	Sweden U21	5	(0)
- * Club domestic league appearances and goals as of 3 August 2026 ‡ National team caps and goals as of 17:10, 6 October 2026 (UTC)

Olle Samuelsson (born 16 May 2004) is a Swedish footballer who plays as a centre-back for BK Häcken.

== Personal life ==
He is a son of Svante Samuelsson.

== Career ==
Samuelsson played youth football in Kalmar FF. He was called up to Sweden U19 for a three-nation tournament in October, but remained on the bench against the Netherlands U17.

Not being offered a Kalmar contract as he became a senior player, he went on trial with Örebro SK and Örgryte IS, but was not given a contract on the second tier and had to move down to the third. After one season in Oskarshamns AIK, he was brought to the second tier by Sandvikens IF.

After only half a season in Superettan, he was signed by BK Häcken in 2025, strengthening their squad ahead of the 2025–26 UEFA Europa League qualifying. In the second qualifying round, Häcken eliminated RSC Anderlecht, with Samuelsson "neutralizing" Kasper Dolberg, which reportedly led to the Belgian club inquiring about Samuelsson's availability.

His Allsvenskan debut came in July. In 2025 and 2026 he was also called up to Sweden U21 and capped three times. Samuelsson was however less used by BK Häcken in 2026.
