= Sanders Ngabo =

Danish footballer (born 2004)

Personal information
- Full name: Bukuru Jack-Sanders Ngabo
- Date of birth: 4 July 2004 (age 22)
- Place of birth: Copenhagen, Denmark
- Height: 1.74 m (5 ft 9 in)
- Position: Midfielder

Team information
- Current team: Lyngby (on loan from BK Häcken)

Youth career
- Sundby
- 2020–2021: Lyngby

Senior career*
Years	Team	Apps	(Gls)
2021–2023	Lyngby	27	(1)
2024	Philadelphia Union	0	(0)
2024	→ Philadelphia Union II (loan)	17	(0)
2024–2025	Horsens	25	(8)
2025–	BK Häcken	18	(1)
2026–	→ Lyngby (loan)	0	(0)

International career
2022	Denmark U18	2	(0)
2022	Denmark U19	4	(0)
2023	Denmark U20	2	(0)
- * Club domestic league appearances and goals as of 3 September 2026

Bukuru Jack-Sanders Ngabo (born 4 July 2004) is a Danish professional footballer who plays as a central midfielder for Lyngby, on loan from Allsvenskan club BK Häcken.

== Club career ==
=== Early career ===
Ngabo is a youth product of his Copenhagen neighborhood club, Sundby BK.

=== Lyngby Boldklub ===
Ngabo moved to the youth academy of Lyngby in 2021. After working his way up the club's youth ranks, he was promoted to their senior squad in 2021. He made his professional debut in a 2–1 win over Nykøbing on 25 July 2021. In August of the same year, he signed his first professional contract with Lyngby, penning a three-year deal. In his debut season with Lyngby, he helped the club finish second in the Danish 1st Division and earn promotion into the Danish Superliga.

=== Philadelphia Union ===
On 16 November 2023, it was announced that Ngabo would join Major League Soccer side Philadelphia Union on a permanent deal on 1 January 2024, having signed a contract through the 2026 season.

=== AC Horsens ===
On 15 August 2024 Ngabo returned to Denmark when he joined 1st Division club AC Horsens on a deal until June 2028.

=== BK Häcken ===
In the beginning of July 2025 it was confirmed that Ngabo had been sold to Swedish club BK Häcken, signing a deal until the end of 2029.

=== Back to Lyngby ===
On 2 September 2026, Sanders returned to play for Lyngby Boldklub on a loan-deal.

== International career ==
Ngabo was born in Denmark and is of Burundi descent. He is a youth international for Denmark, having played for the Denmark U18s and U19s.
