= Sweden men's national under-21 football team =

National under-21 association football team representing Sweden

Sweden Under-21
- Nickname: Blågult (The Blue-Yellow)
- Association: Svenska Fotbollförbundet (SvFF)
- Confederation: UEFA (Europe)
- Head coach: Vacant
- Captain: Vacant
- Most caps: Oscar Hiljemark (37)
- Top scorer: Carlos Strandberg; Ola Toivonen (13)
First colours	Second colours

First international
- Denmark 3–2 Sweden (Esbjerg, Denmark; 22 June 1952)

Biggest win
- Sweden 10–0 Armenia (Lublin, Poland; 13 October 2020)

Biggest defeat
- Ukraine 6–0 Sweden (Kyiv, Ukraine; 31 May 2012); Sweden 0–6 Poland (Jönköping, Sweden; 14 October 2025)

UEFA U-21 Championship
- Appearances: 9 (first in 1972)
- Best result: Champions (2015)

The Sweden national under-21 football team is the football team representing Sweden in competitions for under-21 year old players and is controlled by the Swedish Football Association. Primarily, it competes to qualify for the biennial UEFA European Under-21 Championship.

Sweden made their first European Under-21 Championship appearance in 1986. In 2015, Sweden became champions for the first time. They finished second in 1992 and they also reached the semi-finals in 1990 and 2009. Oscar Hiljemark is the most capped player for the Swedish U21 team, having played 37 caps between 2011 and 2015. Ola Toivonen and Carlos Strandberg are the top goalscorers for the Swedish U21 team, having scored 13 goals each.

== Competitive record ==
Champions Runners-up Third place Fourth place Tournament held on home soil

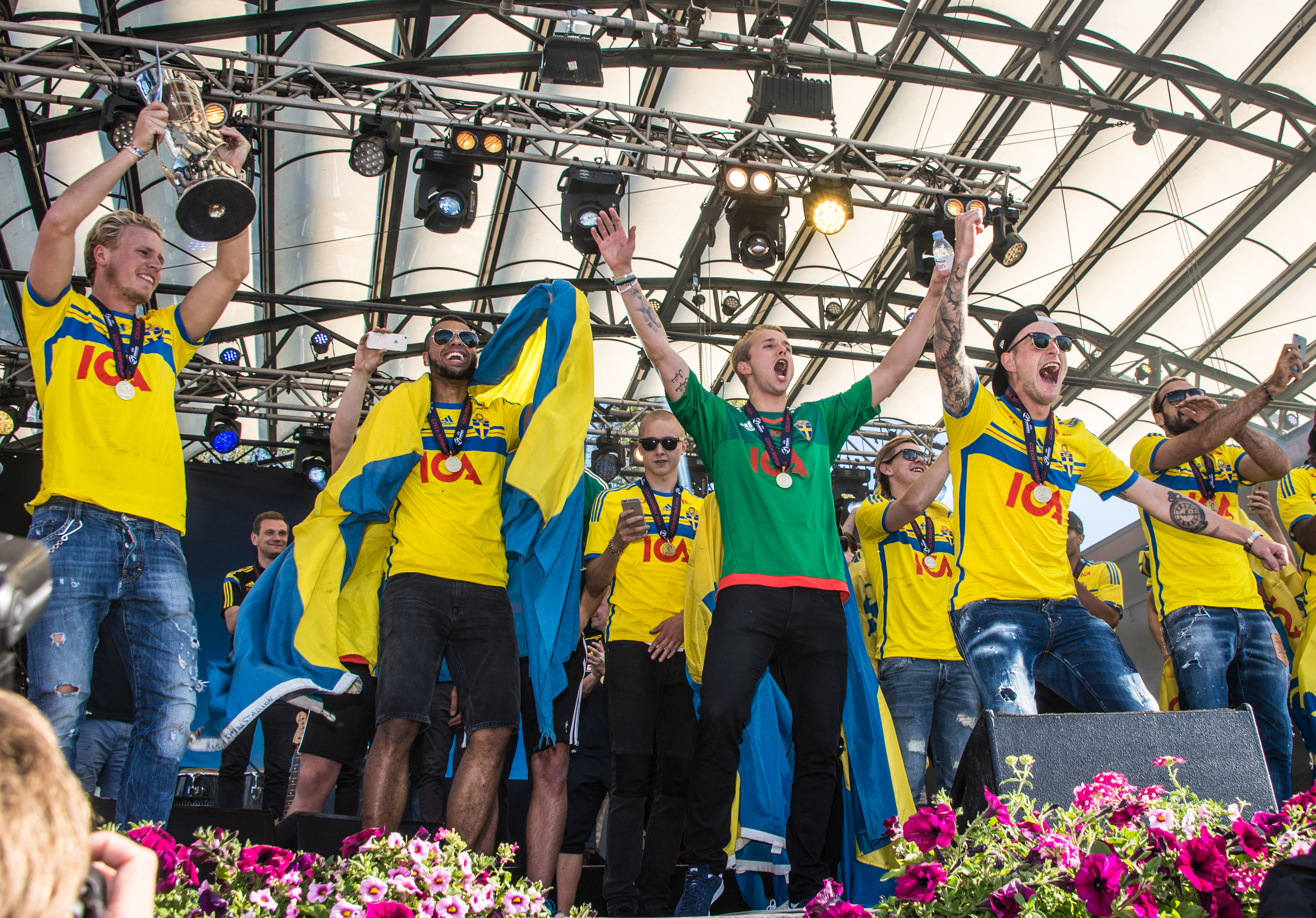
Sweden national under-21 football team celebrating in June 2015, after winning the 2015 UEFA European Under-21 Championship.

=== UEFA European U-21 Championship ===
UEFA European Under-21 Championship record									UEFA European Under-21 Championship qualification record					
Year	Round	Position	Pld	W	D	L	GF	GA	Pld	W	D	L	GF	GA
1972	Quarter-finals	6th	2	1	0	1	2	3	4	3	0	1	8	2
1974	Did not qualify								4	2	1	1	6	5
1976	Did not qualify								4	2	1	1	6	6
1978	Did not qualify								4	1	1	2	6	8
1980	Did not qualify								4	0	1	3	1	4
1982	Did not qualify								4	1	1	2	3	6
1984	Did not qualify								4	2	1	1	10	4
1986	Quarter-finals	6th	2	0	1	1	2	3	6	4	1	1	7	3
1988	Did not qualify								6	1	4	1	6	6
1990	Semi-finals	3rd	4	2	1	1	7	4	6	4	2	0	10	2
1992	Runners-up	2nd	6	3	1	2	4	4	6	4	2	0	17	3
(France) 1994	Did not qualify								10	4	4	2	21	8
(Spain) 1996	Did not qualify								8	5	1	2	15	4
(Romania) 1998	Quarter-finals	6th	3	1	0	2	3	3	10	9	0	1	30	6
(Slovakia) 2000	Did not qualify								8	2	0	6	7	15
(Switzerland) 2002	Did not qualify								12	6	4	2	22	10
(Germany) 2004	Fourth place	4th	5	3	1	1	11	7	10	5	3	2	20	14
(Portugal) 2006	Did not qualify								10	6	0	4	16	12
(Netherlands) 2007	Did not qualify								4	3	0	1	8	6
(Sweden) 2009	Semi-finals	3rd	4	2	1	1	12	7	Qualified as hosts					
(Denmark) 2011	Did not qualify								10	6	2	2	17	10
(Israel) 2013	Did not qualify								12	7	1	4	20	14
(Czech Republic) 2015	Champions	1st	5	2	2	1	7	4	10	6	1	3	24	17
(Poland) 2017	Group stage	9th	3	0	2	1	2	5	10	7	3	0	24	7
(Italy) (San Marino) 2019	Did not qualify								10	6	2	2	19	8
(Hungary) (Slovenia) 2021	Did not qualify								9	5	0	4	28	12
(Romania) (Georgia (country)) 2023	Did not qualify								10	5	3	2	22	8
(Slovakia) 2025	Did not qualify								10	5	2	3	25	10
(Albania) (Serbia) 2027	Did not qualify								10	4	1	5	12	22
Total	1 title	9/29	34	14	9	11	50	40	215	115	42	58	410	232

== Players ==
=== Current squad ===
The following 24 players were called up for the 2027 UEFA European Under-21 Championship qualification matches against Poland and North Macedonia on 30 September and 5 October 2026, respectively.

Caps and goals updated as of 5 October 2026, after the match against North Macedonia.

No.	Pos.	Player	Date of birth (age)	Caps	Goals	Club
1	GK	Viktor Andersson	30 March 2004 (age 22)	3	0	(Swedish Football Association) IFK Göteborg
12	GK	Elis Jäger	23 August 2005 (age 21)	2	0	(Swedish Football Association) Västerås SK
	GK	Leo Cavallius	20 February 2005 (age 21)	0	0	(Swedish Football Association) IF Brommapojkarna
	GK	Theo Krantz	14 June 2006 (age 20)	0	0	(Swedish Football Association) IFK Norrköping
2	DF	Oskar Cotton	18 February 2006 (age 20)	2	0	(Swedish Football Association) IK Oddevold
3	DF	Peter Amoran	22 May 2004 (age 22)	8	2	(Swedish Football Association) Västerås SK
4	DF	Olle Samuelsson	16 May 2004 (age 22)	5	0	(Swedish Football Association) BK Häcken
5	DF	Noah Tolf	13 August 2005 (age 21)	9	0	(Swedish Football Association) IFK Göteborg
13	DF	Malte Frejd Pålsson	20 February 2006 (age 20)	1	0	(Swedish Football Association) Malmö FF
14	DF	Gustav Westström	18 January 2004 (age 22)	1	0	(Swedish Football Association) Landskrona BoIS
	DF	Wilmer Olofsson	16 September 2005 (age 21)	1	0	(Swedish Football Association) AIK
6	MF	Yannick Geiger	23 June 2007 (age 19)	3	0	(Swedish Football Association) AIK
8	MF	Victor Svensson	10 June 2006 (age 20)	3	1	(Swedish Football Association) IK Sirius
10	MF	Karl Gunnarsson	1 October 2005 (age 21)	3	0	(Swedish Football Association) Västerås SK
15	MF	Adam Herdonsson	7 April 2004 (age 22)	2	0	(Danish Football Association) Horsens
17	MF	Jardell Kanga	13 December 2005 (age 20)	5	0	(Scottish Football Association) Motherwell
	MF	Noel Sernelius	24 July 2006 (age 20)	0	0	(Swedish Football Association) IFK Norrköping
7	FW	Charlie Rosenqvist	1 May 2007 (age 19)	3	0	(Swedish Football Association) Djurgårdens IF
9	FW	Leo Östman	15 March 2006 (age 20)	3	0	(Swedish Football Association) IF Elfsborg
11	FW	Alieu Njie	14 May 2005 (age 21)	8	1	(Italian Football Federation) Fiorentina
16	FW	Sixten Gustafsson	5 February 2007 (age 19)	1	0	(Swedish Football Association) AIK
18	FW	Sion Oppong	25 September 2007 (age 19)	3	0	(French Football Federation) Toulouse
19	FW	Neo Jönsson	19 January 2007 (age 19)	2	1	(Swedish Football Association) IK Sirius
20	FW	Richie Omorowa	30 March 2004 (age 22)	14	5	(Royal Dutch Football Association) Jong Utrecht

=== Recent call-ups ===
The following 16 players, born in 2006 or later, have previously been called up to the squad.

Pos.	Player	Date of birth (age)	Caps	Goals	Club	Latest call-up
GK	Nils Ramming	28 March 2007 (age 19)	0	0	(England) Rochdale	v. Finland, 4 June 2026
GK	Simon Eriksson	24 April 2006 (age 20)	0	0	(Spain) Racing Santander	v. Italy, 31 March 2026
DF	Genesis Antwi	11 May 2007 (age 19)	5	0	(France) Strasbourg	v. North Macedonia, 5 October 2026 ^{WD}
DF	John Mellberg	30 July 2006 (age 20)	2	0	(Austria) Red Bull Salzburg	v. North Macedonia, 5 October 2026 ^{WD}
DF	Bleon Kurtulus ^{KOS}	24 June 2007 (age 19)	9	0	(Sweden) Malmö FF	v. Finland, 4 June 2026
DF	Harry Hilvenius	6 October 2007 (age 19)	1	0	(Sweden) BK Häcken	v. Finland, 4 June 2026
MF	Kenan Busuladžić ^{BIH}	6 February 2007 (age 19)	1	0	(Sweden) Malmö FF	v. Finland, 4 June 2026
MF	Adrian Lahdo	26 December 2007 (age 18)	0	0	(Italy) Como	v. Finland, 4 June 2026 ^{WD}
MF	Isak Alemayehu	11 October 2006 (age 20)	1	0	(England) Queens Park Rangers	v. Croatia, 10 June 2025
MF	Zakaria Loukili	25 January 2006 (age 20)	2	0	(Sweden) Landskrona BoIS	v. Wales, 23 March 2025
MF	Lucas Bergvall	2 February 2006 (age 20)	5	1	(England) Tottenham Hotspur	v. Croatia, 11 June 2024 ^{WD}
FW	Jonah Kusi-Asare	4 July 2007 (age 19)	12	1	(England) Fulham	v. North Macedonia, 5 October 2026 ^{WD}
FW	Elias Pihlström	31 August 2006 (age 20)	3	0	(Switzerland) Lugano	v. Finland, 4 June 2026
FW	Malte Persson	2 July 2006 (age 20)	1	0	(Sweden) Halmstads BK	v. Finland, 4 June 2026
FW	David Isso	17 August 2007 (age 19)	0	0	(Sweden) IF Brommapojkarna	v. Finland, 4 June 2026 ^{WD}
FW	Isak Brusberg	5 September 2006 (age 20)	0	0	(Poland) Raków Częstochowa	v. Armenia, 18 November 2025 ^{WD}
Notes: ^{WD} = Player withdrew from the squad; ^{BIH} = Switched to Bosnia and Herzegovina national team; ^{KOS} = Switched to Kosovo national team

=== Previous squads ===
- 1998 UEFA European Under-21 Championship squad
- 2004 UEFA European Under-21 Championship squad
- 2009 UEFA European Under-21 Championship squad
- 2015 UEFA European Under-21 Championship squad
- 2017 UEFA European Under-21 Championship squad

== Players with most caps and goals ==
Updated as of 7 June 2018. Note that the matches played by Sweden Olympic football team in 1992 and 2016 are included here, as the Swedish Football Association recognizes them as Under-21 matches.

=== Top 10 most capped players ===
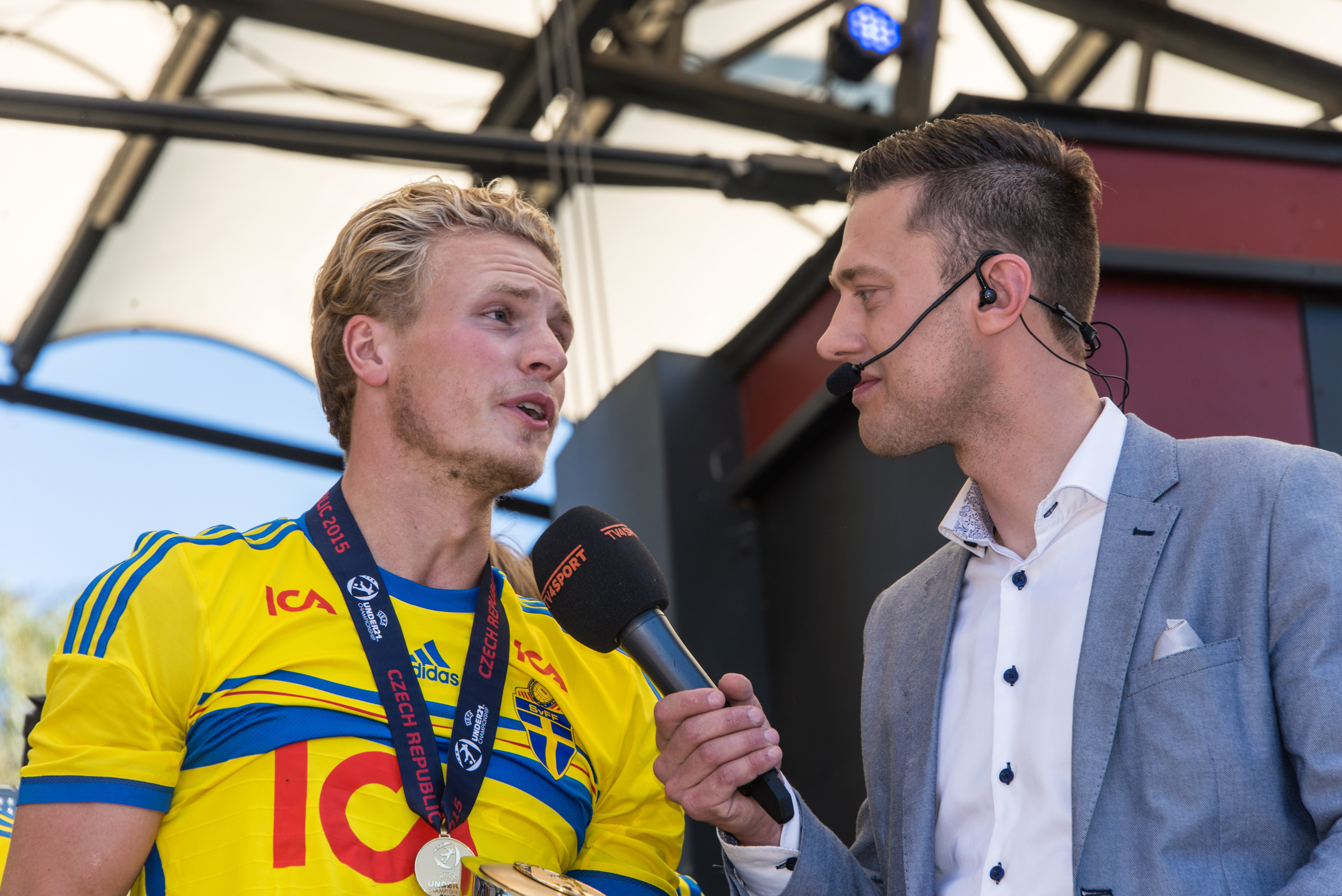
Oscar Hiljemark holds the record for most appearances made for the team, having 37 caps.

#	Player	Career	Caps	Goals
1	Oscar Hiljemark	2011–2015	37	4
2	Alexander Farnerud	2002–2006	36	12
3	Jonny Rödlund	1990–1993	35	11
4	Simon Tibbling	2012–2017	33	2
5	Magnus Johansson	1990–1993	32	0
6	Mikael Dorsin	2000–2004	31	1
6	Mattias Bjärsmyr	2005–2009	31	0
8	Johan Elmander	2000–2004	30	12
8	Tommy Jönsson	1995–1998	30	2
8	Sven Andersson	1981–1986	30	0

=== Top 10 goalscorers ===
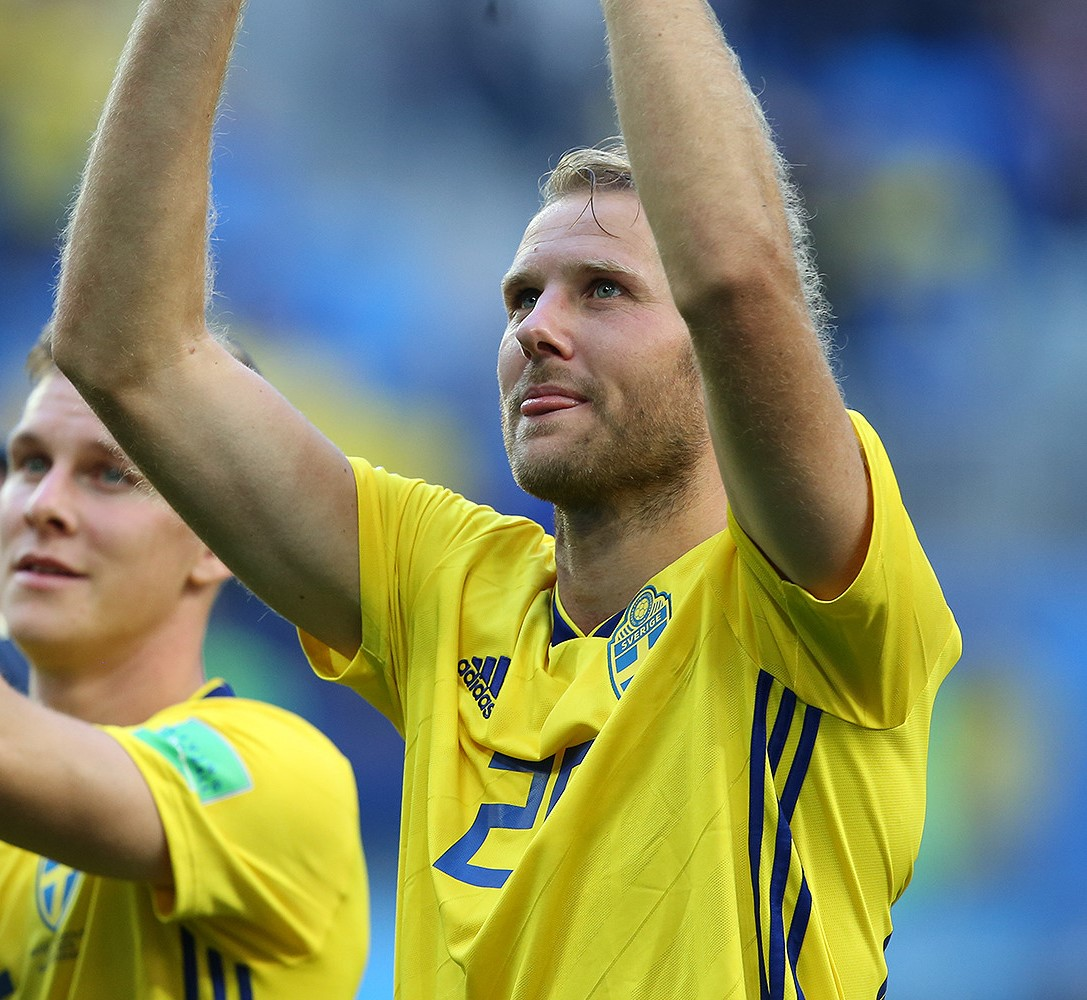
Ola Toivonen, with 13 goals is the team's joint top goalscorer with Carlos Strandberg, Toivonen being the first to reach the tally.

#	Player	Career	Goals	Caps
1	Carlos Strandberg	2015–2018	13	18
1	Ola Toivonen	2006–2009	13	28
3	Pär-Olof Ohlsson	1972–1977	12	19
3	John Guidetti	2010–2015	12	23
3	Johan Elmander	2000–2004	12	30
3	Alexander Farnerud	2002–2006	12	36
7	Mikael Ishak	2012–2016	11	27
7	Jonny Rödlund	1990–1993	11	35
9	Niklas Skoog	1994–1995	10	14
10	Tord Grip	1958–1961	9	10
10	Lasse Larsson	1982–1987	9	10

== See also ==
- Sweden men's national football team
- Sweden Olympic football team
- Sweden men's national under-19 football team
- Sweden men's national under-17 football team
- Sweden national football B team (defunct)
- UEFA European Under-21 Championship
