= Julius Lindberg (footballer) =

Swedish footballer (born 1999)

Personal information
- Full name: Jörgen Julius Lindberg
- Date of birth: 4 January 1999 (age 27)
- Place of birth: Kungälv, Sweden
- Height: 1.82 m (6 ft 0 in)
- Positions: Forward; midfielder; right back

Team information
- Current team: BK Häcken
- Number: 11

Youth career
- Ytterby IS
- 2010–2014: IFK Göteborg
- IK Kongahälla

Senior career*
Years	Team	Apps	(Gls)
2016–2017	Ytterby IS	20	(6)
2018–2019	Qviding FIF	39	(30)
2020–2023	GAIS	81	(26)
2024–	BK Häcken	61	(9)
- * Club domestic league appearances and goals as of 8 July 2026

Julius Lindberg (born 4 January 1999) is a Swedish footballer who plays as a midfielder for BK Häcken in Allsvenskan.

After residing in Thailand for one year before starting school, his family moved to Kungälv Municipality where he played youth football for Ytterby IS. He was a part of IFK Göteborg's academy from 2010 to 2014, when he transferred back to Kungälv and IK Kongahälla.

He started his senior career in Ytterby IS on the fifth and sixth tier, Division 3 and 4, before moving to Qviding FIF in Division 3. While Ytterby had been relegated to Division 5 in his last season there, Lindberg experienced two straight promotions with Qviding, managed by Robert Vilahamn. Not least, Qviding was helped by Lindberg scoring 13 goals in 14 matches in 2018, followed by 17 goals in 25 matches in 2019.

In 2020 he was picked up by GAIS. He played as both forward and midfielder. As GAIS won promotion to the 2024 Allsvenskan, Lindberg moved across the city to one of GAIS' rivals, reigning champions BK Häcken.

In one of the Gothenburg derbies, Lindberg was booed by GAIS supporters. He made his first Allsvenskan debut on 31 March 2024 and scored his first Allsvenskan goal the next week; he was later repurposed as a right back.
