= Tim Prica =

Swedish footballer (born 2002)

Personal information
- Full name: Bo Tim Rade Tiger Prica
- Date of birth: 23 April 2002 (age 24)
- Place of birth: Helsingborg, Sweden
- Height: 1.83 m (6 ft 0 in)
- Position: Forward

Team information
- Current team: IFK Norrköping
- Number: 9

Youth career
- –2012: Nardo FK
- 2012–2014: Maccabi Tel Aviv
- 2014–2018: Malmö FF

Senior career*
Years	Team	Apps	(Gls)
2019–2020	Malmö FF	5	(0)
2020–2024	AaB	53	(8)
2022–2023	→ WSG Tirol (loan)	46	(8)
2024–	IFK Norrköping	78	(13)

International career^{‡}
2017–2019	Sweden U17	22	(11)
2019–2020	Sweden U19	4	(4)
2021–2024	Sweden U21	12	(4)
- * Club domestic league appearances and goals as of 11 November 2026 ‡ National team caps and goals as of 17:30, 16 October 2024 (UTC)

Bo Tim Rade Tiger Prica (born 23 April 2002) is a Swedish professional footballer who plays as a forward for Allsvenskan side IFK Norrköping.

== Career ==
On 10 August 2020 it was confirmed, that 18-year old Prica had joined Danish Superliga club AaB on a four-year deal. He got shirt number 11.

== Personal life ==
Prica is the son of the Swedish former footballer Rade Prica. Through his father, Prica is of Serbian and Croatian descent. With his father being an expatriate footballer, Prica played youth football in multiple foreign countries before joining Malmö upon his family returning to Sweden.

== Career statistics ==
As of 19 August 2019.

Club	Season	League			Cup		Continental		Total	
Club	Season	Division	Apps	Goals	Apps	Goals	Apps	Goals	Apps	Goals
Malmö	2019	Allsvenskan	1	0	0	0	1	0	2	0
Malmö	2020	Allsvenskan	4	0	2	0	0	0	6	0
Malmö	Total		5	0	2	0	1	0	8	0
AaB	2020–21	Danish Superliga	15	1	2	0	0	0	17	1
AaB	Total		15	1	2	0	0	0	17	1
Career total			11	0	2	0	1	0	14	0
