= Srđan Hrstić =

Serbian footballer (born 2003)

Personal information
- Date of birth: 1 January 2003 (age 23)
- Place of birth: Sombor, Serbia and Montenegro
- Height: 1.92 m (6 ft 4 in)
- Position: Striker

Team information
- Current team: Rheindorf Altach
- Number: 11

Youth career
- –2020: Spartak Subotica

Senior career*
Years	Team	Apps	(Gls)
2020–2023	Spartak Subotica	50	(9)
2023–	Häcken	47	(9)
2025–2026	→ Rheindorf Altach (loan)	26	(3)
2026–	Rheindorf Altach	4	(0)

International career^{‡}
2019–2020	Serbia U17	3	(0)
2021	Serbia U19	5	(1)
2023	Serbia U21	1	(0)
- * Club domestic league appearances and goals as of 10 June 2026 ‡ National team caps and goals as of 8 December 2024

Srđan Hrstić (born 18 July 2003) is a Serbian footballer who plays as a striker for Austrian Bundesliga club Rheindorf Altach.

== Career ==
Born in Sombor, he played youth football for FK Spartak Subotica and made his senior debut for the club in June 2020. He was also capped for Serbia on youth and U21 levels. His first Serbian SuperLiga goals came in August 2021.

Hrstić was bought by Allsvenskan club BK Häcken in early August. He was a direct replacement of Bénie Traoré, meant to contribute immediately, and Häcken's most expensive player of all time. Hrstić made his debut for Häcken in the 2023–24 UEFA Europa League qualifying, where he started by playing and scoring in both fixtures against Žalgiris. The aggregate victory qualified Häcken for the 2023–24 UEFA Europa League group stage. Häcken saw considerably less success in the group stage, losing most games, with Hrstić scoring a single consolation goal against Molde.

In the latter half of the 2023 Allsvenskan, Hrstić made his league debut on 13 August against Varberg, but did not score his first goal until 29 October against Mjällby. Häcken were fighting for victory in the 2023 Allsvenskan, but a loss of form led to criticism of the club administration for selling players like Bénie Traoré. Hrstić was called "ice cold" by Göteborgs-Posten, reflecting that he did not start a single match in October.

Häcken changed manager in 2024, and hoped that the 2024 Allsvenskan would be the breakthrough season of the Serbian striker. He ended up scoring 4 league goals. Häcken also participated in the 2024–25 UEFA Conference League qualifying, routing several weaker teams in the initial phases. Hrstić scored three goals (of the team's total twelve) during the two matches against F91 Dudelange. In the summer of 2024, Häcken concluded that they would make do with their existing strikers, including Hrstić.

On 5 September 2025, Hrstić was loaned out to Austrian Bundesliga club SC Rheindorf Altach.

== Personal life ==
Adapting to a foreign country, Hrstić did not speak English or other foreign languages, but most of all missed his family. Hrstić is religious.
