= 2024–25 Svenska Cupen =

2024–2025 Svenska Cupen
Tournament details
- Country: Sweden
- Dates: 14 May 2024 – 29 May 2025
- Teams: 96

Final positions
- Champions: BK Häcken
- Runners-up: Malmö FF

Tournament statistics
- Matches played: 118
- Goals scored: 411 (3.48 per match)

The 2024–25 Svenska Cupen was the 69th season of the Svenska Cupen and the 13th season in the current format. The winners qualified for the first qualifying round of the 2025–26 UEFA Europa League.

A total of 96 clubs entered the competition, 64 teams from district sites and 32 from the Allsvenskan and the Superettan.

BK Häcken won the cup on 29 May 2025 (their fourth Svenska Cupen win), defeating defending cup holders Malmö FF 4–2 on penalties in the final after a 0–0 draw.

== Round dates ==
The schedule of the competition is as follows.

Phase	Round	Match date
Initial rounds	Round 1	14 May – 4 July 2024
Initial rounds	Round 2	20–22 August 2024
Group stage	Matchday 1	15–16 February 2025
Group stage	Matchday 2	22–23 February 2025
Group stage	Matchday 3	1–2 March 2025
Knockout stage	Quarter-final	8–9 March 2025
Knockout stage	Semi-final	15–16 March 2025
Knockout stage	Final	29 May 2025

== Round 1 ==
The draw was made on 3 April 2024. 64 clubs from the third tier or lower of the Swedish league system competed in this round.

Number of teams per tier still in competition
Allsvenskan (tier 1)	Superettan (tier 2)	Ettan (tier 3)	Division 2 (tier 4)	Division 3 (tier 5)	Division 4 (tier 6)	Division 5 (tier 7)	Total
16 / 16	16 / 16	19 / 19	29 / 29	11 / 11	4 / 4	1 / 1	96 / 96

Team 1	Score	Team 2
14 May 2024
FBK Balkan (4)	1–2 (a.e.t.)	IFK Simrishamn (4)
21 May 2024
IFK Skövde (4)	0–1	IK Tord (4)
22 May 2024
Åstorps FF (5)	0–2	Eskilsminne IF (3)
Tidaholms GoIF (5)	1–4 (a.e.t.)	Jönköpings Södra IF (3)
Enskede IK (4)	1–0	FC Arlanda (4)
29 May 2024
IK Franke (4)	0–2	Täby FK (3)
Styrsö BK (7)	0–5	FC Trollhättan (3)
IFK Haninge (4)	0–4	FC Stockholm (3)
13 June 2024
Landvetter IS (4)	0–4	Falkenbergs FF (3)
IF Lödde (4)	0–4	Ariana FC (3)
5 June 2024
Viggbyholms IK (4)	1–1 (a.e.t.) (2–4 p)	Karlbergs BK (3)
11 June 2024
Torslanda IK (3)	2–1	Onsala BK (3)
Årsunda IF (5)	2–1	Korsnäs IF (5)
12 June 2024
Timmernabbens IF (6)	1–5	IFK Berga (4)
17 June 2024
Jönköpings BK (5)	0–4	Smedby AIS (4)
19 June 2024
Dalkurd FF (4)	1–5	Sollentuna FK (3)
BK Forward (4)	0–5	FBK Karlstad (3)
20 June 2024
Huddinge IF (4)	3–2 (a.e.t.)	Nacka FC (4)
Stegeborgs IF (6)	2–4	Nyköpings BIS (4)
23 June 2024
IFK Eskilstuna (4)	1–2	IFK Stocksund (3)
25 June 2024
FC Gute (4)	2–1 (a.e.t.)	Vasalunds IF (3)
Sunnersta AIF (5)	0–2	FC Järfälla (4)
IF Haga (5)	2–2 (a.e.t.) (4–3 p)	Borens IK (5)
Herrestads AIF (4)	1–0	Vänersborgs IF (4)
IK Zenith (5)	0–3	Tvååkers IF (3)
Kristianopels GoIF (5)	1–3	IFK Hässleholm (4)
26 June 2024
Skellefteå FF (4)	1–2	Piteå IF (3)
IFK Östersund (4)	1–0	Hudiksvalls FF (4)
2 July 2024
Kubikenborgs IF (5)	3–2	Gottne IF (4)
Ängelholms FF (3)	2–0	Torns IF (3)
3 July 2024
Götaholms BK (6)	3–2	IK Gauthiod (4)
4 July 2024
Brålanda IF (6)	2–4	IF Karlstad (3)

== Round 2 ==
The draw was made on 9 July 2024.

Number of teams per tier still in competition
Allsvenskan (tier 1)	Superettan (tier 2)	Ettan (tier 3)	Division 2 (tier 4)	Division 3 (tier 5)	Division 4 (tier 6)	Division 5 (tier 7)	Total
16 / 16	16 / 16	16 / 19	12 / 29	3 / 11	1 / 4	0 / 1	64 / 96

Team 1	Score	Team 2
20 August 2024
Sollentuna FK (3)	0–2	Örebro SK (2)
FC Gute (4)	1–3	Västerås SK (1)
Tvååkers IF (3)	1–3	Trelleborgs FF (2)
FC Stockholm (3)	1–0	GIF Sundsvall (2)
Årsunda IF (5)	0–5	Skövde AIK (2)
IF Karlstad (3)	1–3	IK Sirius (1)
Jönköpings Södra IF (3)	1–2	IFK Värnamo (1)
Ängelholms FF (3)	0–4	Kalmar FF (1)
Herrestads AIF (4)	0–2	Helsingborgs IF (2)
21 August 2024
Nyköpings BIS (4)	1–4	Degerfors IF (2)
FBK Karlstad (3)	2–3	Sandvikens IF (2)
Karlbergs BK (3)	2–1 (a.e.t.)	Östersunds FK (2)
Götaholms BK (6)	1–3	Östers IF (2)
Kubikenborgs IF (5)	1–7	AIK (1)
IFK Östersund (4)	0–5	IF Brommapojkarna (1)
Piteå IF (3)	1–3	IFK Norrköping (1)
IFK Berga (4)	1–2	Örgryte IS (2)
Smedby AIS (4)	1–2	Utsiktens BK (2)
FC Trollhättan (3)	2–4	GAIS (1)
IF Haga (5)	0–2	Halmstads BK (1)
IFK Hässleholm (4)	1–5	Mjällby AIF (1)
22 August 2024
IFK Simrishamn (4)	1–3	Varbergs BoIS (2)
Huddinge IF (4)	0–1	Gefle IF (2)
Enskede IK (4)	1–2 (a.e.t.)	IK Brage (2)
Täby FK (3)	0–2	IK Oddevold (2)
Falkenbergs FF (3)	0–2	Landskrona BoIS (2)
Ariana FC (3)	0–2	IFK Göteborg (1)
29 August 2024
IFK Stocksund (3)	1–6	Hammarby IF (1)
2 October 2024
IK Tord (4)	1–2	BK Häcken (1)
10 October 2024
FC Järfälla (4)	1–6	Djurgårdens IF (1)
30 October 2024
Eskilsminne IF (3)	0–5	IF Elfsborg (1)
1 December 2024
Malmö FF (1)	5–2 (a.e.t.)	Torslanda IK (3)

== Group stage ==
The draw was made on 3 December 2024. The 32 winners from Round 2 were divided into eight groups of four teams. The 16 highest ranked winners from the previous rounds were seeded to the top two positions in each group and the 16 remaining winners were unseeded in the draw. The ranking of the 16 seeded teams was decided by league position in the 2024 season. All teams in the group stage play each other once, the highest-ranked teams from the previous rounds and teams from tier three play two home matches.

Number of teams per tier still in competition
Allsvenskan (tier 1)	Superettan (tier 2)	Ettan (tier 3)	Division 2 (tier 4)	Division 3 (tier 5)	Division 4 (tier 6)	Division 5 (tier 7)	Total
16 / 16	14 / 16	2 / 19	0 / 29	0 / 11	0 / 4	0 / 1	32 / 96

=== Qualified teams ===
Seeded

- Malmö FF (1)
- Hammarby IF (1)
- AIK (1)
- Djurgårdens IF (1)
- Mjällby AIF (1)
- GAIS (1)
- IF Elfsborg (1)
- BK Häcken (1)
- IK Sirius (1)
- IF Brommapojkarna (1)
- IFK Norrköping (1)
- Halmstads BK (1)
- IFK Göteborg (1)
- IFK Värnamo (1)
- Kalmar FF (1)
- Västerås SK (1)

Unseeded

- Degerfors IF (2)
- Östers IF (2)
- Landskrona BoIS (2)
- Helsingborgs IF (2)
- Örgryte IS (2)
- Sandvikens IF (2)
- Trelleborgs FF (2)
- IK Brage (2)
- Utsiktens BK (2)
- Varbergs BoIS (2)
- Örebro SK (2)
- IK Oddevold (2)
- Gefle IF (2)
- Skövde AIK (2)
- FC Stockholm Internazionale (3)
- Karlbergs BK (3)

=== Group 1 ===
Pos	Team	Pld	W	D	L	GF	GA	GD	Pts	Qualification	MFF	VSK	UTS	SKÖ
1	Malmö FF	3	3	0	0	10	1	+9	9	Advance to Knockout stage		3–0	5–0	
2	Västerås SK	3	2	0	1	7	4	+3	6				2–1	5–0
3	Utsiktens BK	3	1	0	2	3	8	−5	3					2–1
4	Skövde AIK	3	0	0	3	2	9	−7	0		1–2			

Source: SvFF
Rules for classification: 1) Points; 2) Goal difference; 3) Goals scored; 4) Head-to-head record; 5) Lowest disciplinary points; 6) Highest ranked team

=== Group 2 ===
Pos	Team	Pld	W	D	L	GF	GA	GD	Pts	Qualification	HAM	STI	KFF	VAR
1	Hammarby IF	3	2	1	0	6	2	+4	7	Advance to Knockout stage			2–1	1–1
2	Stockholm Internazionale	3	2	0	1	4	4	0	6		0–3		2–0	
3	Kalmar FF	3	1	0	2	4	5	−1	3					3–1
4	Varbergs BoIS	3	0	1	2	3	6	−3	1			1–2		

Source: SvFF
Rules for classification: 1) Points; 2) Goal difference; 3) Goals scored; 4) Head-to-head record; 5) Lowest disciplinary points; 6) Highest ranked team

=== Group 3 ===
Pos	Team	Pld	W	D	L	GF	GA	GD	Pts	Qualification	TRE	AIK	DEG	IFKV
1	Trelleborgs FF	3	2	1	0	7	4	+3	7	Advance to Knockout stage		1–1		
2	AIK	3	1	2	0	4	2	+2	5				1–1	2–0
3	Degerfors IF	3	1	1	1	4	4	0	4		0–1			
4	IFK Värnamo	3	0	0	3	5	9	−4	0		3–4		2–3	

Updated to match(es) played on 28 February 2025. Source: SvFF
Rules for classification: 1) Points; 2) Goal difference; 3) Goals scored; 4) Head-to-head record; 5) Lowest disciplinary points; 6) Highest ranked team

=== Group 4 ===
Pos	Team	Pld	W	D	L	GF	GA	GD	Pts	Qualification	IFKG	DIF	SIF	IKO
1	IFK Göteborg	3	3	0	0	9	3	+6	9	Advance to Knockout stage			3–0	2–0
2	Djurgårdens IF	3	1	1	1	7	6	+1	4		3–4		2–0	
3	Sandvikens IF	3	1	0	2	1	5	−4	3					1–0
4	IK Oddevold	3	0	1	2	2	5	−3	1			2–2		

Source: SvFF
Rules for classification: 1) Points; 2) Goal difference; 3) Goals scored; 4) Head-to-head record; 5) Lowest disciplinary points; 6) Highest ranked team

=== Group 5 ===
Pos	Team	Pld	W	D	L	GF	GA	GD	Pts	Qualification	MAIF	HBK	LAN	GEF
1	Mjällby AIF	3	3	0	0	12	0	+12	9	Advance to Knockout stage		3–0	4–0	
2	Halmstads BK	3	2	0	1	6	3	+3	6				2–0	4–0
3	Landskrona BoIS	3	1	0	2	3	7	−4	3					3–1
4	Gefle IF	3	0	0	3	1	12	−11	0		0–5			

Source: SvFF
Rules for classification: 1) Points; 2) Goal difference; 3) Goals scored; 4) Head-to-head record; 5) Lowest disciplinary points; 6) Highest ranked team

=== Group 6 ===
Pos	Team	Pld	W	D	L	GF	GA	GD	Pts	Qualification	IFKN	GAIS	KRB	ÖRE
1	IFK Norrköping	3	3	0	0	9	3	+6	9	Advance to Knockout stage				5–1
2	GAIS	3	2	0	1	6	4	+2	6		0–3			4–1
3	Karlbergs BK	3	1	0	2	3	5	−2	3		2–1	1–2		
4	Örebro SK	3	0	0	3	4	10	−6	0				1–2	

Source: SvFF
Rules for classification: 1) Points; 2) Goal difference; 3) Goals scored; 4) Head-to-head record; 5) Lowest disciplinary points; 6) Highest ranked team

=== Group 7 ===
Pos	Team	Pld	W	D	L	GF	GA	GD	Pts	Qualification	IFE	BP	ÖRG	BRA
1	IF Elfsborg	3	2	1	0	5	2	+3	7	Advance to Knockout stage		1–1	3–1	
2	IF Brommapojkarna	3	1	2	0	4	1	+3	5				3–0	0–0
3	Örgryte IS	3	1	0	2	4	7	−3	3					3–1
4	IK Brage	3	0	1	2	1	4	−3	1		0–1			

Updated to match(es) played on 1 March 2025. Source: SvFF
Rules for classification: 1) Points; 2) Goal difference; 3) Goals scored; 4) Head-to-head record; 5) Lowest disciplinary points; 6) Highest ranked team

=== Group 8 ===
Pos	Team	Pld	W	D	L	GF	GA	GD	Pts	Qualification	BKH	ÖIF	IKS	HEL
1	BK Häcken	3	2	0	1	7	3	+4	6	Advance to Knockout stage		3–0	0–2	
2	Östers IF	3	2	0	1	4	3	+1	6					1–0
3	IK Sirius	3	2	0	1	4	4	0	6			0–3		2–1
4	Helsingborgs IF	3	0	0	3	2	7	−5	0		1–4			

Updated to match(es) played on 1 March 2025. Source: SvFF
Rules for classification: 1) Points; 2) Goal difference; 3) Goals scored; 4) Head-to-head record; 5) Lowest disciplinary points; 6) Highest ranked team

== Knockout stage ==
The eight group winners from the group stage entered the knockout stage, beginning with the quarter-finals. The top four group winners overall were seeded in the quarter-final draw, each facing one of the bottom four group winners (unseeded in the draw) at home.

=== Qualified teams ===
Pos	Grp	Team	Pld	W	D	L	GF	GA	GD	Pts	Qualification
1	5	Mjällby AIF	3	3	0	0	12	0	+12	9	Seeded in quarter-final draw
2	1	Malmö FF	3	3	0	0	10	1	+9	9	Seeded in quarter-final draw
3	4	IFK Göteborg	3	3	0	0	9	3	+6	9	Seeded in quarter-final draw
4	6	IFK Norrköping	3	3	0	0	9	3	+6	9	Seeded in quarter-final draw
5	2	Hammarby IF	3	2	1	0	6	2	+4	7	Unseeded in quarter-final draw
6	7	IF Elfsborg	3	2	1	0	5	2	+3	7	Unseeded in quarter-final draw
7	3	Trelleborgs FF	3	2	1	0	6	4	+2	7	Unseeded in quarter-final draw
8	8	BK Häcken	3	2	0	1	7	3	+4	6	Unseeded in quarter-final draw

Rules for classification: 1) Points; 2) Goal difference; 3) Goals scored; 4) Head-to-head record; 5) Lowest disciplinary points; 6) Highest ranked team

=== Bracket ===
Quarter-finals
10 March 2025 – Malmö
Malmö FF (a.e.t.)	1
IF Elfsborg	0
9 March 2025 – Gothenburg
IFK Göteborg	4
Hammarby IF	0
8 March 2025 – Hällevik
Mjällby AIF	0
BK Häcken	1
9 March 2025 – Norrköping
IFK Norrköping (a.e.t.)	3
Trelleborgs FF	1

Semi-finals
16 March 2025 – Malmö
Malmö FF (a.e.t.)	3
IFK Göteborg	2
16 March 2025 – Gothenburg
BK Häcken	3
IFK Norrköping	1

Final
29 May 2025 – Malmö
Malmö FF	0 (2)
BK Häcken (a.e.t.)	0 (4)

=== Quarter-finals ===
8 March 2025	Mjällby AIF (1)	0–1	BK Häcken (1)	Hällevik
16:00 CET (UTC+1)		Report	Faye 90+4'	Stadium: Strandvallen; Attendance: 1,908; Referee: Victor Wolf

9 March 2025	IFK Göteborg (1)	4–0	Hammarby IF (1)	Gothenburg
13:00 CET (UTC+1)	Heintz 25'; Markovic 33', 72', 82'	Report		Stadium: Ullevi; Attendance: 26,190; Referee: Fredrik Klitte

9 March 2025	IFK Norrköping (1)	3–1 (a.e.t.)	Trelleborgs FF (2)	Norrköping
16:00 CET (UTC+1)	Prica 47'; Jørgensen 91'; Sigurgeirsson 100'	Report	Hörberg 41'	Stadium: PlatinumCars Arena; Attendance: 4,382; Referee: Glenn Nyberg

10 March 2025	Malmö FF (1)	1–0 (a.e.t.)	IF Elfsborg (1)	Malmö
18:30 CET (UTC+1)	Thelin 96' (pen.)	Report		Stadium: Eleda Stadion; Attendance: 12,872; Referee: Mohammed Al-Hakim

=== Semi-finals ===
16 March 2025	BK Häcken (1)	3–1	IFK Norrköping (1)	Gothenburg
13:00 CET (UTC+1)	Hrstić 24'; Lundkvist 45+1'; Holm 83'	Report	Prica 18'	Stadium: Bravida Arena; Attendance: 3,688; Referee: Joakim Östling

16 March 2025	Malmö FF (1)	3–2 (a.e.t.)	IFK Göteborg (1)	Malmö
16:00 CET (UTC+1)	Thelin 31', 45+2'; Berg 112'	Report	Fenger 72'; Þórðarson 87'	Stadium: Eleda Stadion; Attendance: 20,742; Referee: Kristoffer Karlsson

=== Final ===
29 May 2025	Malmö FF (1)	0–0 (a.e.t.) (2–4 p)	BK Häcken (1)	Malmö
15:00 CET (UTC+1)				Stadium: Eleda Stadion; Attendance: 20,189; Referee: Glenn Nyberg
	Penalties
	Hakšabanović (penalty missed); Berg (penalty scored); Busanello (penalty missed); Rosengren (penalty scored)		(penalty missed) Gustafson; (penalty scored) Leach Holm; (penalty scored) Lundkvist; (penalty scored) Berisha; (penalty scored) Andersen
