= BK Häcken =

Association football club in Sweden

Häcken
- Full name: Bollklubben Häcken
- Nickname: Getingarna (The Wasps)
- Founded: 2 August 1940; 86 years ago
- Ground: Nordic Wellness Arena, Gothenburg
- Capacity: 6,500
- Chairman: Anders Billström
- Head coach: Jens Gustafsson
- League: Allsvenskan
- 2025: Allsvenskan, 10th of 16
- Website: www.bkhacken.se
Home colours	Away colours

Bollklubben Häcken, more commonly known as BK Häcken or simply Häcken (Swedish pronunciation: [ˈhɛ̌kːɛn]), is a Swedish professional football club based in Gothenburg (Hisingen). It currently plays in the Allsvenskan, the top tier of Swedish football. Formed on 2 August 1940, Häcken has played 23 seasons in Allsvenskan, debuting in the league in 1983.

The club is affiliated to Gothenburg Football Association and play their home games at Nordic Wellness Arena. The club colours, reflected in their crest and kit, are yellow and black.

== History ==
=== The beginning ===
The club was started by a group of 14- to 15-year-old youngsters who wanted not just to play football for fun but also to create an organisation and participate in the national league system. Originally they played under the name BK Kick, but that name had already been taken by another club, and so when they applied to join the Gothenburg Football Association, their local FA, they renamed themselves Bollklubben Häcken, referencing the hedge (sv: häck) which grew around the field where they practised. Bollklubben Häcken was formally registered on 2 August 1940.

=== First decades ===
Following the first years the club only played sporadic matches, youth championships and a few other matches, but eventually they started to play at the senior level. As of 1943 the club started to take in the league system and success came in an instant. Between 1944 and 1947 the club won their league and climbed from west seniorclass 4 to seniorclass 1.

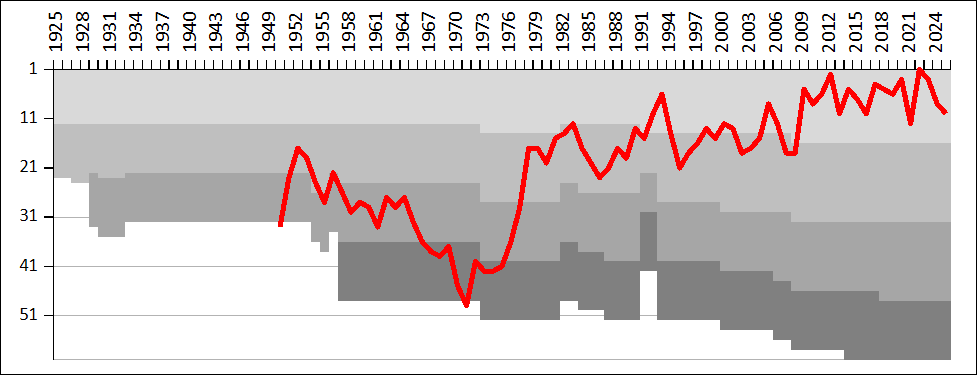
A chart showing the progress of BK Häcken through the Swedish football league system. The different shades of gray represent league divisions.

The start of the 1950s went as well as the 1940s had. The club won Division 4 in 1950 and when they won Division 3 the following year, they went from a local club to be known as a "comet team" in the national media. The club fought for a place in Allsvenskan in 1953 but saw themselves defeated by Kalmar FF, and in 1954 the club was relegated from Division 2. In 1955 the club set the record for the most spectators during a Division 3 game against IK Oddevold, when 18,229 people showed up for the game. BK Häcken played in Division 3 for the rest of the decade.

The 1960s started with the opening of the club's new clubhouse, now known as Häckensborg. Häcken spent most of the decade as a stable Division 3 team, but in 1967 they were relegated to Division 4 and it was struck by some severe economical and internal problems.

The 1970s started just as badly as the previous decade ended. The club fell out of Division 4 and held discussions with IF Warta about a merger. A discussion had been up several times earlier but had not gone as far as now, at the day of the voting the IF Warta members voted for a merging while the BK Häcken members voted against it. In 1971 the club won Division 5, the club then played in Division 4 until 1975 when they won it and in 1977 they won Division 3 with former Swedish international Agne Simonsson as manager, when the club earlier won Division 3 in 1951 they climbed directly up to Division 2, however this time they had to play a qualifier against IK Brage, Motala AIF and Degerfors. The club won and took the step up to Division 2. During 1978–79 the club played successfully in Division 2 with a 3rd place as the best position. In 1978 BK Häcken also started a ladies team.

=== Reaching Allsvenskan ===
The new decade started as strong as the last one ended, Agne Simonsen continued to bring success to the club as they won Division 2 and qualified for a position in Allsvenskan, however IF Elfsborg proved too strong with a 0–1 home defeat at Gamla Ullevi and then a 1–1 result in Borås at Ryavallen. However, during the game at Gamla Ullevi, BK Häcken sets the club record for biggest home audience with 19 205. However the club was not let down by this and came in 2nd place in 1982 and this time they qualified for the promotion play-offs against IFK Norrköping, BK Häcken is able to reach a 2–0 result home at Rambergsvallen and then achieve a 1–1 away at Idrottsparken in Norrköping and the club reached Allsvenskan for the first time in club history. The time that BK Häcken spends in Allsvenskan is however short, the club's successful manager Agne Simonsen leaves for a local competitor and Reine Almqvist takes over, the club ends up last in the league and is relegated back to Division 2 where they play for the rest of the 1980s.

BK Häcken starts the 1990s with winning Division 1 söder and faces GIF Sundsvall in the promotion play-offs, and despite an impressive 5–2 victory at home for Häcken, Sundsvall is able to come back in and win the match in Sundsvall and gets promoted to Allsvenskan. The club was also successful plying in Svenska Cupen and reaches the final, but are defeated again, this time 3–0 by Djurgårdens IF. The club is close in reaching Allsvenskan again in 1991, but a 2–2 home and 1–1 away sees them losing the position to Helsingborgs IF. 1992 is more successful as they reach Allsvenskan through a 4th place in Kvalsvenskan and this time the spell in the top league is not as short as earlier, BK Häcken ends up on in 6th place in 1993 and gets to play a second year in Allsvenskan, however the club ends up last in the league in 1994 and following some turbulence on the leadership side of the club it stays in Division 1 until 1997 as the club ended up in 2nd place and qualifies for the play-offs against Västerås SK, with a 1–1 home and with a 4–2 away BK Häcken climbs up to Allsvenskan again. The club is however relegated again in 1998 after ending up second last, but returns in 1999 after winning Division 1 Södra, this year Kim Källström also makes his debut for the club.

=== New millennium ===
The new millennium continues as the last decade did, the club is able to defend its Allsvenska position in a relegation/promotion play-off against Mjällby AIF in the end of the 2000 season after penalties, Kjell Pettersson leaves the club and Torbjörn Nilsson takes over as manager. 2001 BK Häcken plays its sixth season overall in Allsvenskan but ends second last and is relegated to Superettan, through a cooperation with Floda BoIF future Liberian national Dulee Johnson arrives at the club and in 2002 and he gets company from Jimmy Dixon and Dioh Williams. BK Häcken stays in Superettan until 2004, being close to take the step up both in 2002, failing on goal difference, and in 2003, defeated by GIF Sundsvall in the play-offs, in 2004 the clubs reaches Allsvenskan by winning Superettan. The club brings in former Swedish international Teddy Lučić and Danish international Stig Tøfting in 2005 in an attempt to reach a higher position the earlier, the club reaches 8th places. The 2006 season gets harder as Stig Tøfting and Dulee Johnson leaves the club and the club is forced to play against a qualify against IF Brommapojkarna, BK Häcken is defeated by a total of 4–1 and is relegated to Superettan.

In 2010, Häcken earned the Fair Play award for the Allsvenskan. This resulted in the team earning a spot in the 1st Qualifying Round of the 2011–12 UEFA Europa League when Sweden won third place in the UEFA Fair Play ranking.

In 2012, BK Häcken finished second in Allsvenskan, which was their best performance in the league so far. During this season, the Ghanaian striker Waris Majeed scored 23 goals, which made him the Allsvenskan top scorer of the year. In 2016, Häcken secured their first main title, as they beat Malmö FF in the final of the Svenska Cupen, and won the cup title. In 2019, Häcken secured their second main title, as they beat AFC Eskilstuna in the final of the Svenska Cupen with 3–0 at Nordic Wellness Arena.

The club won the 2022 edition of Allsvenskan, becoming Swedish champions for the first time in their history.

On 11 May 2023, BK Häcken won the Swedish Cup for the third time, by defeating Mjällby AIF, 4–1 in the final game at Strandvallen.

On 29 May 2025, BK Häcken won the Swedish Cup again, this time by defeating Malmö FF on away ground, 4–2 following penalty shootout after a 0–0 draw.

== Rivalries ==
Häcken's main rivals are the three other main Gothenburg teams IFK Göteborg, GAIS and Örgryte IS, with IFK being considered the biggest rival. A lesser rivalry also consists between Häcken and IF Elfsborg from Borås, as well as with other teams from the island of Hisingen, namely IF Warta and Hisingsbacka FC, especially between the younger aged teams.

== Honours ==
- Swedish Champions (Note: The title of "Swedish Champions" has been awarded to the winner of four different competitions over the years. Between 1896 and 1925 the title was awarded to the winner of Svenska Mästerskapet, a stand-alone cup tournament. No club were given the title between 1926 and 1930 even though the first-tier league Allsvenskan was played. In 1931 the title was reinstated and awarded to the winner of Allsvenskan. Between 1982 and 1990 a play-off in cup format was held at the end of the league season to decide the champions. After the play-off format in 1991 and 1992 the title was decided by the winner of Mästerskapsserien, an additional league after the end of Allsvenskan. Since the 1993 season the title has once again been awarded to the winner of Allsvenskan.)
  - Winners (1): 2022

=== Leagues ===
- Allsvenskan
  - Champions (1): 2022
  - Runners-up (1): 2012
- Superettan
  - Champions (1): 2004
  - Runners-up (1): 2008
- Division 1 Södra:
  - Champions (2): 1990, 1999
  - Runners-up (1): 1997
- Division 1 Västra
  - Champions (1): 1992

=== Cups ===
- Svenska Cupen
  - Winners (4): 2015–16, 2018–19, 2022–23, 2024–25
  - Runners-up (2): 1989–90, 2020–21

== European record ==
As of 6 August 2026

Competition	Played	Won	Drew	Lost	GF	GA	GD	Win%
UEFA Champions League	4	2	2	0	8	4	+4	50.00
UEFA Cup / UEFA Europa League	40	14	9	17	48	60	−12	35.00
UEFA Europa Conference League / UEFA Conference League	10	5	1	4	32	18	+14	50.00
Total	54	21	12	21	88	82	+6	38.89

Legend: GF = Goals For. GA = Goals Against. GD = Goal Difference.

Season	Competition	Round	Club	Home	Away	Aggregate
2007–08	UEFA Cup	First qualifying round	(Iceland) KR Reykjavik	1–1	1–0	2–1
2007–08	UEFA Cup	Second qualifying round	(Scotland) Dunfermline Athletic	1–0	1–1	2–1
2007–08	UEFA Cup	First round	(Russia) Spartak Moscow	1–3	0–5	1–8
2011–12	UEFA Europa League	First qualifying round	(Luxembourg) UN Käerjéng 97	5–1	1–1	6–2
2011–12	UEFA Europa League	Second qualifying round	(Finland) Honka	1–0	2–0	3–0
2011–12	UEFA Europa League	Third qualifying round	(Portugal) Nacional	2–1	0–3	2–4
2013–14	UEFA Europa League	Second qualifying round	(Czech Republic) Sparta Prague	1–0	2–2	3–2
2013–14	UEFA Europa League	Third qualifying round	(Switzerland) Thun	1–2	0–1	1–3
2016–17	UEFA Europa League	Second qualifying round	(Republic of Ireland) Cork City	1–1	0–1	1–2
2018–19	UEFA Europa League	First qualifying round	(Latvia) Liepāja	1–2	3–0	4–2
2018–19	UEFA Europa League	Second qualifying round	(Germany) RB Leipzig	1–1	0–4	1–5
2019–20	UEFA Europa League	Second qualifying round	(Netherlands) AZ	0–3	0–0	0–3
2021–22	UEFA Europa Conference League	Second qualifying round	(Scotland) Aberdeen	2–0	1–5	3–5
2023–24	UEFA Champions League	First qualifying round	(Wales) The New Saints	3–1	2–0	5–1
2023–24	UEFA Champions League	Second qualifying round	(Faroe Islands) KÍ	3–3 (a.e.t.)	0–0	3−3 (3–4 p)
2023–24	UEFA Europa League	Third qualifying round	(Lithuania) Žalgiris	5–0	3–1	8–1
2023–24	UEFA Europa League	Play-off round	(Scotland) Aberdeen	2–2	3–1	5–3
2023–24	UEFA Europa League	Group H	(Germany) Bayer Leverkusen	0–2	0–4	
2023–24	UEFA Europa League	Group H	(Azerbaijan) Qarabağ	0–1	1–2	
2023–24	UEFA Europa League	Group H	(Norway) Molde	1–3	1–5	
2024–25	UEFA Conference League	Second qualifying round	(Luxembourg) F91 Dudelange	6–1	6–2	12−3
2024–25	UEFA Conference League	Third qualifying round	(Estonia) Paide Linnameeskond	6–1	1–1	7−2
2024–25	UEFA Conference League	Play-off round	(Germany) Heidenheim	1–2	2–3	3–5
2025–26	UEFA Europa League	First qualifying round	(Slovakia) Spartak Trnava	2–2	1–0	3−2
2025–26	UEFA Europa League	Second qualifying round	(Belgium) Anderlecht	2–1 (a.e.t.)	0–1	2–2 (4–2 p)
2025–26	UEFA Europa League	Third qualifying round	(Norway) Brann	0–2	1–0	1–2
2025–26	UEFA Conference League	Play-off round	(Romania) CFR Cluj	7–2	0–1	7–3
2025–26	UEFA Conference League	League phase	(Republic of Ireland) Shelbourne	—N/a	0–0	
2025–26	UEFA Conference League	League phase	(Spain) Rayo Vallecano	2–2	—N/a	
2025–26	UEFA Conference League	League phase	(France) Strasbourg	1–2	—N/a	
2025–26	UEFA Conference League	League phase	(Bosnia and Herzegovina) Zrinjski Mostar	—N/a	1–2	
2025–26	UEFA Conference League	League phase	(Cyprus) AEK Larnaca	1–1	—N/a	
2025–26	UEFA Conference League	League phase	(Slovakia) Slovan Bratislava	—N/a	0–1	

== Players ==
=== First-team squad ===
As of 31 August 2026

Note: Flags indicate national team as defined under FIFA eligibility rules; some limited exceptions apply. Players may hold more than one non-FIFA nationality.

No.	Pos.	Nation	Player
1	GK	SWE	Andreas Linde
5	DF	NOR	Brice Wembangomo
6	MF	CIV	Abdoulaye Doumbia
8	MF	NOR	Simen Hestnes
9	FW	SWE	Gustav Lindgren
10	MF	DEN	Mikkel Rygaard (captain)
11	DF	SWE	Julius Lindberg
12	DF	SWE	Filip Öhman
13	DF	SWE	Harry Hilvenius
14	FW	NOR	Markus Haaland (on loan from Brann)
15	DF	FIN	Leo Väisänen
16	MF	SWE	Pontus Dahbo
17	DF	SWE	Ben Engdahl
18	MF	SWE	Wilson Lindberg

No.	Pos.	Nation	Player
19	MF	SWE	David Seger
20	FW	FIN	Adrian Svanbäck
21	DF	SWE	Adam Lundkvist
22	DF	SWE	Filip Helander
23	DF	SWE	Olle Samuelsson
24	FW	SWE	Bamir Sadiku
25	FW	TAN	Sabri Kondo
27	FW	CIV	Christ Wawa
29	FW	DEN	Mads Agger (on loan from Pogon Szczecin)
30	GK	SWE	Kristian Marinkovic
32	MF	SWE	Harun Ibrahim (on loan from Sharjah)
35	GK	SWE	David Andersson
99	GK	ALB	Etrit Berisha

=== Out on loan ===
Note: Flags indicate national team as defined under FIFA eligibility rules; some limited exceptions apply. Players may hold more than one non-FIFA nationality.

No.	Pos.	Nation	Player
7	MF	DEN	Sanders Ngabo (at Lyngby until 30 June 2027)
22	DF	SRB	Nikola Zečević (at Železničar Pančevo until 30 June 2027)

No.	Pos.	Nation	Player
40	MF	SWE	Malte Ljungkull (at Norrby IF until 30 November 2026)
—	DF	SWE	Johannes Engvall (at Norrby IF until 30 November 2026)

=== Retired numbers ===
2 – Johan Lind, defender (1995–2010)

== Managers ==
- (Sweden) Sven-Agne Larsson (1958–59)
- (Sweden) Agne Simonsson (1977–82)
- (Sweden) Reine Almqvist (1983, 1989–93)
- (Sweden) Jan Sjöström (1984–86)
- (Sweden) Stefan Lundin (1989–91)
- (Sweden) Kjell Pettersson (1996–00)
- (Sweden) Torbjörn Nilsson (2001)
- (Sweden) Jörgen Lennartsson (2002–04)
- (Sweden) Stefan Lundin (2005 – Sept 06)
- (Sweden) Reine Almqvist (Sept 2006–07)
- (Sweden) Sonny Karlsson (2007–09)
- (Sweden) Peter Gerhardsson (2009–16)
- (Sweden) Mikael Stahre (2017)
- (Sweden) Andreas Alm (2018–21)
- (Norway) Per-Mathias Høgmo (2021–2023)
- (Norway) Pål Arne Johansen (2024)
- (Netherlands) Joop Oosterveld (interim) (2024)
- (Sweden) Jens Gustafsson (2025-)
