= 2026 Djurgårdens IF season =

2026 Djurgårdens IF Fotboll season

Djurgårdens IF Fotboll
2026 season
- Chairman: Erik Gozzi
- Head coach: Jani Honkavaara (until 10 November); Abel Lorincz and Agon Mehmeti (interim, from 10 November)
- Stadium: 3Arena
- Allsvenskan: 3rd
- 2025–26 Svenska Cupen: Quarter-final
- 2026–27 Svenska Cupen: Second Round
- Top goalscorer: League: Kristian Lien (16); All: Kristian Lien (18)
- Highest home attendance: 27,902 v Malmö; 17 April 2026
- Lowest home attendance: 12,066 v Falkenberg; 21 February 2026
- Average home league attendance: 22,480
- Biggest win: 0–8 v IFK Skövde; 1 March 2026
- Biggest defeat: 0–2 v Falkenberg; 21 February 2026; 1–3 v AIK; 16 August 2026
Home colours	Away colours	Third colours
- All statistics correct as of 8 November 2026.

The 2026 season is Djurgårdens IF's 126th in existence, their 71st season in Allsvenskan and their 26th consecutive season in the league. In addition to the Allsvenskan, they will compete in the 2025–26 and the 2026–27 editions of the Svenska Cupen.

== Squad ==
=== Season squad ===
Squad no.	Name	Nationality	Position	Date of birth (age)	Previous club	Apps	Goals
Goalkeepers
30	Lukas Jonsson	(Sweden)	GK	21 October 1992 (age 34)	(Germany) Osnabrück	1	0
35	Jacob Rinne	(Sweden)	GK	20 June 1993 (age 33)	(Saudi Arabia) Al Fateh SC	60	0
40	Marco Biondi	(Sweden)	GK	23 February 2008 (age 18)	(Sweden) Djurgården Youth	0	0
Defenders
2	Piotr Johansson	(Sweden)	DF	28 February 1995 (age 31)	(Sweden) Kalmar FF	139	5
4	Jacob Une (C)	(Sweden)	DF	8 April 1994 (age 32)	(Sweden) IF Brommapojkarna	281	14
5	Miro Tenho	(Finland)	DF	2 April 1995 (age 31)	(Finland) HJK Helsinki	102	4
18	Adam Ståhl	(Finland)	FW	8 October 1994 (age 32)	(Sweden) Mjällby AIF	83	7
21	Mikael Marqués	(Sweden)	DF	8 September 2001 (age 25)	(Sweden) Västerås SK	22	1
24	Max Larsson	(Sweden)	DF	7 July 2003 (age 23)	(Sweden) Västerås SK	26	1
25	Daryl Tschoumy Nana	(Germany)	DF	17 January 2007 (age 19)	(Germany) VfL Bochum	1	0
36	Alieu Atlee Manneh	(Sweden)	DF	20 August 2006 (age 20)	(Sweden) Djurgården Youth	4	0
Midfielders
6	Peter Langhoff	(Denmark)	MF	2 January 2004 (age 22)	(Denmark) Lyngby	21	0
7	Christos Almyras	(Greece)	MF	18 July 2005 (age 21)	(Denmark) Asteras Tripolis	15	2
8	Patric Åslund	(Sweden)	MF	1 August 2002 (age 24)	(Sweden) Västerås	68	12
13	Daniel Stensson	(Sweden)	MF	24 March 1997 (age 29)	(Sweden) IK Sirius	58	2
19	Jeppe Okkels	(Denmark)	MF	27 July 1999 (age 27)	(England) Preston North End	38	10
20	Matias Siltanen	(Finland)	MF	29 March 2007 (age 19)	(Finland) KuPS	64	0
28	Alexander Andersson	(Sweden)	MF	25 April 2010 (age 16)	(Sweden) IF Brommapojkarna	6	1
29	Alexander Johansson	(Sweden)	MF	3 September 2009 (age 17)	(Sweden) IFK Stocksund	4	2
Forwards
9	Kristian Lien	(Norway)	FW	30 September 2001 (age 25)	(Netherlands) Groningen	32	18
10	Abdul Abdulmalik	(England)	FW	21 April 2003 (age 23)	(England) Boreham Wood	3	0
11	Oskar Fallenius	(Sweden)	FW	1 November 2001 (age 25)	(Denmark) Brøndby IF	122	12
14	Charlie Rosenqvist	(Sweden)	FW	1 May 2007 (age 19)	(Sweden) Kalmar FF	10	2
16	Bo Hegland	(Norway)	FW	18 June 2004 (age 22)	(Norway) Moss FK	36	13
26	Angelo Agbejoye	(Nigeria)	FW	7 September 2007 (age 19)	(Nigeria) Grassrunners FC	1	1
27	Sander Ringberg	(Norway)	FW	12 August 1999 (age 27)	(Norway) Sandnes Ulf	2	0
38	Hannes Hyllenbom	(Sweden)	FW	25 August 2008 (age 18)	(Sweden) Djurgården Youth	0	0
Away on loan
3	Leon Hien	(Sweden)	DF	31 July 2001 (age 25)	(Sweden) Degerfors	6	0
17	Ahmed Saeed	(Sweden)	MF	22 April 2008 (age 18)	(Sweden) Karlslund	8	0
23	Nino Žugelj	(Slovenia)	FW	23 May 2000 (age 26)	(Norway) Bodø/Glimt	24	7
25	Kalipha Jawla	(Sweden)	FW	11 April 2006 (age 20)	(Sweden) Huddinge IF	6	0
27	Melvin Vučenović Persson	(Sweden)	DF	3 January 2007 (age 19)	(Sweden) Djurgården Youth	1	0
37	Carl Selfvén	(Sweden)	MF	30 March 2007 (age 19)	(Sweden) Djurgården Youth	1	0
40	Max Croon	(Sweden)	GK	26 November 2005 (age 20)	(Sweden) Viggbyholms IK	0	0
45	Filip Manojlović	(Serbia)	GK	25 April 1996 (age 30)	(Bosnia and Herzegovina) Borac Banja Luka	27	0

Last updated: 8 November 2026.
Source: []

== Transfers ==
=== Loans in ===
Date from	Position	Nationality	Name	From	Date until	Ref.
25 March 2026	FW	(Sweden)	Joel Asoro	(France) Metz	9 August 2026	

=== Loans out ===
Date from	Position	Nationality	Name	To	Date until	Ref.
7 August 2025	DF	(Sweden)	Viktor Bergh	(Germany) Hansa Rostock	30 June 2026	
13 March 2026	GK	(Sweden)	Max Croon	(Sweden) Gefle	31 December 2026	
28 March 2026	FW	(Sweden)	Kalipha Jawla	(Sweden) Nordic United	1 July 2026	
6 May 2026	DF	(Sweden)	Melvin Vucenovic Persson	(Sweden) Vasalund IF	31 December 2026	
30 July 2026	MF	(Sweden)	Ahmed Saeed	(Sweden) FC Stockholm	27 August 2026	
31 July 2026	FW	(Sweden)	Kalipha Jawla	(Sweden) Östers IF	31 December 2026	
5 August 2026	GK	(Serbia)	Filip Manojlović	(Norway) IK Start	31 December 2026	
5 August 2026	DF	(Sweden)	Leon Hien	(Norway) Tromsø IL	31 December 2026	
7 August 2026	MF	(Sweden)	Vincent Larsson	(Sweden) Enskede IK	31 December 2026	
8 August 2026	MF	(Sweden)	Carl Selfvén	(Sweden) IFK Stocksund	31 December 2026	
27 August 2026	MF	(Sweden)	Ahmed Saeed	(Sweden) FC Arlanda	31 December 2026	
28 August 2026	FW	(Sweden)	Milian Jansson	(Sweden) Karlbergs BK	31 December 2026	
28 August 2026	FW	(Slovenia)	Nino Žugelj	(Sweden) IFK Göteborg	31 December 2026	
4 September 2026	MF	(Sweden)	Abdirahim Abdulle	(Sweden) FC Järfälla	31 December 2026	

=== Transfers in ===
Date from	Position	Nationality	Name	From	Fee	Ref.
20 January 2026	FW	(Norway)	Kristian Lien	(Netherlands) Groningen	Undisclosed	
28 January 2026	DF	(Sweden)	Max Larsson	(Sweden) Västerås	Undisclosed	
5 February 2026	MF	(Denmark)	Peter Langhoff	(Denmark) Lyngby	Undisclosed	
24 June 2026	FW	(Nigeria)	Angelo Agbejoye	(Nigeria) Grassrunners FC	Undisclosed	
2 July 2026	DF	(Germany)	Daryl Tschoumy-Nana	(Germany) VfL Bochum	Undisclosed	
18 July 2026	MF	(Sweden)	Alexander Johansson	(Sweden) IFK Stocksund	Undisclosed	
19 July 2026	MF	(Greece)	Christos Almyras	(Greece) Asteras Tripolis	Undisclosed	
27 July 2026	GK	(Sweden)	Lukas Jonsson	(Germany) VfL Osnabrück	Undisclosed	
6 August 2026	FW	(Norway)	Sander Ringberg	(Norway) Sandnes Ulf	Undisclosed	
21 August 2026	DF	(Brazil)	Lucca Gentil	(Brazil) Sfera FC	Undisclosed	
30 August 2026	FW	(England)	Abdul Abdulmalik	(England) Boreham Wood	Undisclosed	
31 August 2026	FW	(Sweden)	Charlie Rosenqvist	(Sweden) Kalmar	Undisclosed	

=== Transfers out ===
Date from	Position	Nationality	Name	To	Fee	Ref.
17 January 2026	FW	(Norway)	Tokmac Nguen	(Saudi Arabia) Al-Okhdood Club	Undisclosed	
17 January 2026	DF	(Kenya)	Frank Odhiambo	(Kenya) Gor Mahia	Undisclosed	
19 January 2026	DF	(Sweden)	Theo Bergvall	(Switzerland) FC Lausanne-Sport	Undisclosed	
20 January 2026	FW	(Denmark)	August Priske	(England) Birmingham City	Undisclosed	
24 May 2026	FW	(Sweden)	Zakaria Sawo	(Azerbaijan) Qarabağ FK	Undisclosed	
2 July 2026	MF	(Iceland)	Mikael Anderson	(Denmark) Aarhus	Undisclosed	
7 July 2026	FW	(Finland)	Santeri Haarala	(Finland) HJK Helsinki	Undisclosed	
11 July 2026	DF	(Sweden)	Viktor Bergh	(Germany) Karlsruher SC	Undisclosed	
25 August 2026	MF	(Sweden)	Hampus Finndell	(Poland) Jagiellonia Białystok	Undisclosed	

=== Released ===
Date from	Position	Nationality	Name	To	Notes	Ref.
22 January 2026	DF	(Sweden)	Marcus Danielson		End of contract	
6 May 2026	GK	(Sweden)	Malkolm Nilsson Säfqvist		Retired	

- Note: Players will join other clubs after being released or terminated from their contract. Only the following clubs are mentioned when that club signed the player in the same transfer window.

== Competitions ==
=== Overview ===
Competition	First match	Last match	Starting round	Final position	Record							
Competition	First match	Last match	Starting round	Final position	Pld	W	D	L	GF	GA	GD	Win %
Allsvenskan	6 April 2026	29 November 2026	Matchday 1	TBC	28	16	4	8	56	27	+29	57.14
2025–26 Svenska Cupen	13 August 2025	15 March 2026	Round 2	Quarter Final	4	2	0	2	10	3	+7	50.00
2026–27 Svenska Cupen	10 September 2026	TBC	Round 2	TBC	1	1	0	0	7	1	+6	100.00
Total					33	19	4	10	73	31	+42	57.58

Last updated: 8 November 2026
Source: Soccerway

=== Club friendlies ===
16 January 2026 Friendly	(Sweden) Brommapojkarna	1-1	Djurgården (Sweden)	Lidingö
11:00 CET	Hedström 51'	Report	Sliwo 35'	Stadium: Bosön; Referee: (Sweden) Tess Olofsson

24 January 2026 Friendly	(Sweden) Djurgården	2-3	Viking (Norway)	Las Palmas
20:00 CET	Anderson 41'; Ståhl 82'	Report	Hansen 18'; Haugen 45+1'; Mikaelsson 85'	Stadium: Ciudad deportiva de Barranco Seco

7 February 2026 Friendly	(Sweden) Västerås SK	0-1	Djurgården (Sweden)	Västerås
11:00 CET		Report	Åslund 29'	Stadium: Hitachi Energy Arena; Referee: (Sweden) Henrik Karlsson

14 February 2026 Friendly	(Sweden) Djurgården	2-1	Vålerenga (Norway)	Stockholm
13:00 CET	Lien 1'; Hegland 89'	Report	Haren 68'	Stadium: 3Arena; Referee: (Sweden) Erik Mattsson

21 March 2026 Friendly	(Sweden) Djurgården	2-1	Degerfors (Sweden)	Stockholm
13:30 CET	Hegland 54' 56'	Report	Fritzson 12'	Stadium: 3Arena; Referee: (Sweden) Richard Sundell

27 March 2026 Friendly	(Sweden) Djurgården	4-2	HIFK (Finland)	Lidingö
12:00 CET	Okkels 13'; Hegland 45+1' (pen.); Lien 79'; Une 86'	Report	Montano 16'; Borchers 35'	Stadium: Lidingövallen

26 June 2026 Friendly	(Sweden) Djurgården	1-1	Sirius (Sweden)	Norrtälje
15:00 CET	Sandberg 72'	Report	Hegland 17'	Stadium: Norrtälje Sportcentrum; Referee: (Sweden) Lukas Wallin

3 October 2026 Friendly	(Germany) VfL Osnabrück	0-1	Djurgården (Sweden)	Osnabrück
14:30 CET		Report	Lien 55'	Stadium: Stadion an der Bremer Brücke

=== Allsvenskan ===
==== League table ====
Pos	Team	Pld	W	D	L	GF	GA	GD	Pts	Qualification or relegation
1	Hammarby IF (X)	28	18	4	6	60	23	+37	58	Qualification for the Champions League second qualifying round
2	IK Sirius (X)	28	18	4	6	58	35	+23	58	Qualification for the Conference League second qualifying round
3	Djurgårdens IF	28	16	4	8	56	27	+29	52	Qualification for the Conference League second qualifying round
4	BK Häcken	28	13	10	5	50	33	+17	49	
5	IF Elfsborg	28	12	10	6	42	31	+11	46	

Updated to match(es) played on 8 November 2026. Source: svenskfotboll.se (in Swedish)
Rules for classification: 1) Points; 2) Goal difference; 3) Goals scored; 4) Head-to-head points; 5) Head-to-head goal difference; 6) Head-to-head away goals scored; 7) Play-off
(Note: Play-off is only played if need to decide champion, teams for relegation or UEFA competition and will be played on a neutral ground).
(X) Guaranteed at least UEFA Conference League

==== Results summary ====
Overall								Home						Away					
Pld	W	D	L	GF	GA	GD	Pts	W	D	L	GF	GA	GD	W	D	L	GF	GA	GD
28	16	4	8	56	27	+29	52	7	2	5	34	17	+17	9	2	3	22	10	+12

Source: soccerway

==== Results by round ====
Round	1	2	3	4	5	6	7	8	9	10	11	12	13	14	15	16	17	18	19	20	21	22	23	24	25	26	27	28	29	30
Ground	A	H	H	A	H	H	A	H	H	A	H	A	A	H	A	H	A	H	A	A	H	H	A	A	H	A	H	A	A	H
Result	W	W	L	L	D	W	W	L	L	W	W	D	W	W	L	L	W	W	W	W	W	L	W	W	D	D	W	L		
Position	6	2	7	8	9	4	4	6	7	8	5	4	5	4	3	3	6	4	3	2	2	3	2	2	2	3	3	3		
Points	3	6	6	6	7	10	13	13	13	16	19	20	23	26	26	26	29	32	35	38	41	41	44	47	48	49	52	52		

A = Away; H = Home; W = Win; D = Draw; L = Loss

==== Matches ====
===== April =====
6 April 2026 Match 1	GAIS	0-1	Djurgården	Gothenburg
16:30 CEST	Milovanovic (yellow card) 28'; Holmén (yellow card) 59'	Report	Siltanen (yellow card) 40'; Åslund 65'	Stadium: Gamla Ullevi; Attendance: 17,165; Referee: (Sweden) Mohammed Al-Hakim

12 April 2026 Match 2	Djurgården	3-2	Kalmar	Stockholm
14:00 CEST	Hegland 2'; Lien 7' 85' (penalty missed) 90+5; Marqués (yellow card) 36'	Report	Rosenqvist 16'; Dari 29'	Stadium: 3Arena; Attendance: 26,454; Referee: (Sweden) Richard Sundell

17 April 2026 Match 3	Djurgården	0-1	Malmö	Stockholm
19:00 CEST	Johansson (yellow card) 24'; Tenho (yellow card) 68'; Larsson (yellow card) 90+4'; Hien (yellow card) 90+18'	Report	Sjöstrand (yellow card) 45'; Lundbergh (yellow card) 56'; Hakšabanović 61'; Guðjohnsen (yellow card) 82'	Stadium: 3Arena; Attendance: 27,902; Referee: (Sweden) Fredrik Klitte

22 April 2026 Match 4	Elfsborg	2-1	Djurgården	Borås
19:00 CEST	Magnússon (yellow card) 13'; Ihler 25' (pen.) (yellow card) 30'; Rinne 88' (o.g.); Isherwood (yellow card) 89'	Report	Johansson 19'; Siltanen (yellow card) 24'; Asoro (yellow card) 29'	Stadium: Borås Arena; Attendance: 9,426; Referee: (Sweden) Granit Maqedonci

26 April 2026 Match 5	Djurgården	1-1	Hammarby	Stockholm
14:00 CEST	Lien 9'; Langhoff (yellow card) 86'	Report	Besara 64'; Persson (yellow card) 84'	Stadium: 3Arena; Attendance: 26,775; Referee: (Sweden) Glenn Nyberg

===== May =====
4 May 2026 Match 6	Djurgården	6-0	Göteborg	Stockholm
19:00 CEST	Okkels 15'; Åslund 31' 62'; Lien 34'; Finndell (yellow card) 50'; Asoro 81' 90'	Report	Eriksson (yellow card) 85'; Coimbra (yellow card) 87'	Stadium: 3Arena; Attendance: 20,415; Referee: (Sweden) Kristoffer Karlsson

10 May 2026 Match 7	AIK	2-4	Djurgården	Stockholm
14:00 CEST	Filling 22'; Beširović 64'; Wilson (yellow card) 74'; Celina (yellow card) 82'	Report	Finndell 10'; Tenho 16'; Larsson (yellow card) 30'; Marqués 45+2'; Ståhl (yellow card) 75'; Hegland 86'	Stadium: Strawberry Arena; Attendance: 46,278; Referee: (Sweden) Mohammed Al-Hakim

18 May 2026 Match 8	Djurgården	2-3	Sirius	Stockholm
19:00 CEST	Anderson 13'; Anker 51' (o.g.); Marqués (yellow card) 86'	Report	Krusnell (yellow card) 35'; Lindberg 38'; Ure 43'; Jönsson 57' (yellow card) 58'; Svensson (yellow card) 85'; Ekström (yellow card) 89'	Stadium: 3Arena; Attendance: 23,636; Referee: (Sweden) Victor Wolf

22 May 2026 Match 9	Djurgården	1-2	Brommapojkarna	Stockholm
19:00 CEST	Anderson 28'	Report	Hansen 24'; Strand 63'; Timossi (yellow card) 73'; Sever (yellow card) 90+4'	Stadium: 3Arena; Attendance: 21,836; Referee: (Sweden) Erik Mattsson

===== July =====
6 July 2026 Match 10	Häcken	2-4	Djurgården	Gothenburg
19:00 CEST	Rygaard (yellow card) 24'; Lindberg 29'; Sadiku 83'	Report	Fallenius 4'; Tenho (yellow card) 26'; Lien 41' 73'; Une (yellow card) 58'; Žugelj 86'; Marqués (red card) 90+2'	Stadium: Nordic Wellness Arena; Attendance: 5,984; Referee: (Sweden) Oscar Johnson

13 July 2026 Match 11	Djurgården	3-0	Halmstad	Stockholm
19:00 CEST	Hegland 28' 45'; Lien 57'	Report	Kaib (yellow card) 43'	Stadium: 3Arena; Attendance: 20,009; Referee: (Sweden) Adi Aganovic

20 July 2026 Match 12	Örgryte	0-0	Djurgården	Gothenburg
19:00 CEST	Hofvander (yellow card) 85'	Report	Finndell (yellow card) 2'; Une (yellow card) 83'; Ståhl (yellow card) 85'	Stadium: Gamla Ullevi; Attendance: 8,697; Referee: (Sweden) Granit Maqedonci

25 July 2026 Match 13	Degerfors	0-1	Djurgården	Degerfors
15:00 CEST	Ohlsson (yellow card) 29'	Report	Hegland 43' (yellow card) 65'	Stadium: Stora Valla; Attendance: 5,911; Referee: (Sweden) Adam Ladebäck

===== August =====
3 August 2026 Match 14	Djurgården	6-0	Västerås	Stockholm
19:00 CEST	Åslund 5'; Lien 13' 53' 55'; Ståhl 28'; Tenho 60'	Report	Ladefoged (yellow card) 34'; Keita (yellow card) 36'; Diagne (yellow card) 47'	Stadium: 3Arena; Attendance: 23,943; Referee: (Sweden) Victor Wolf

10 August 2026 Match 15	Västerås	1-0	Djurgården	Västerås
19:00 CEST	Lendambi 24'; Hellisdal (yellow card) 28'	Report	Siltanen (yellow card) 23'; Tenho (yellow card) 87'	Stadium: Hitachi Energy Arena; Attendance: 8,720; Referee: (Sweden) Mohammed Al-Hakim

16 August 2026 Match 16	Djurgården	1-3	AIK	Stockholm
14:00 CEST	Larsson (yellow card) 32'; Hegland 50'	Report	Carlstrand 10' 25' (yellow card) 90+5'; Hove 39' (yellow card) 79'; Olofsson (yellow card) 48'; Gustafsson (yellow card) 53'; Nordfeldt (yellow card) 84'	Stadium: 3Arena; Attendance: 27,274; Referee: (Sweden) Fredrik Klitte

24 August 2026 Match 17	Malmö	0-3	Djurgården	Malmö
19:00 CEST	Pålsson (yellow card) 14'; Busanello (yellow card) 58'; Busuladžić (yellow card) 78'; Rosengren (yellow card) 84'	Report	Lien 35'; Okkels 58'; Tenho (yellow card) 63'; Åslund 82'	Stadium: Eleda Stadion; Attendance: 19,322; Referee: (Sweden) Joakim Sars

31 August 2026 Match 18	Djurgården	4-0	Mjällby	Stockholm
19:00 CEST	Lien 5' 14'; Åslund 26'; Fallenius 87'	Report	Leandersson (yellow card) 87'	Stadium: 3Arena; Attendance: 17,575; Referee: (Sweden) Eric Mattsson

===== September =====
3 September 2026 Match 19	Mjällby	0-2	Djurgården	Hällevik
19:00 CEST	Gustafson (yellow card) 19'; Pettersson (yellow card) 67'	Report	Fallenius (yellow card) 43'; Lien 60'; Okkels 64'; Tenho (yellow card) 90+2'	Stadium: Strandvallen; Attendance: 4,090; Referee: (Sweden) Victor Wolf

7 September 2026 Match 20	Kalmar	0-1	Djurgården	Kalmar
19:00 CEST	Magashy (yellow card) 5'	Report	Almyras (yellow card) 40'; Hegland (yellow card) 61' (goal) 65'; Larsson (yellow card) 63'	Stadium: Guldfågeln Arena; Attendance: 5,062; Referee: (Sweden) Kristoffer Karlsson

14 September 2026 Match 21	Djurgården	2-0	GAIS	Stockholm
19:00 CEST	Stensson (yellow card) 20'; Lien 35'; Hegland 63'; Almyras (red card) 86'	Report	Collander (yellow card) 53'; Ågren (red card) 59'; Sletsjøe (yellow card) 86' (yellow-red card) 90+10'; Fagerjord (yellow card) 90+8'	Stadium: 3Arena; Attendance: 19,163; Referee: (Sweden) Adam Ladebäck

20 September 2026 Match 22	Djurgården	1-2	Elfsborg	Stockholm
14:00 CEST	Stensson (yellow card) 39'; Une 66'	Report	Wikström 44'; Olsson 76'	Stadium: 3Arena; Attendance: 22,458; Referee: (Sweden) Oscar Johnson

===== October =====
11 October 2026 Match 23	Hammarby	0-1	Djurgården	Stockholm
14:00 CEST	Eriksson (yellow card) 40'; Adjei (yellow card) 51'; Boudri (yellow card) 58'	Report	Okkels (yellow card) 38'; Hegland 45'; Lien (yellow card) 58'; Tenho (yellow card) 68'	Stadium: 3Arena; Attendance: 29,070; Referee: (Sweden) Granit Maqedonci

16 October 2026 Match 24	Brommapojkarna	0-2	Djurgården	Vällingby
19:00 CEST	Strand (yellow card) 35'; Bergvall (yellow card) 37'; Simpson (yellow card) 83'	Report	Almyras 9'; Lien 75'	Stadium: Grimsta IP; Attendance: 5,153; Referee: (Sweden) Farouk Nehdi

24 October 2026 Match 25	Djurgården	2-2	Örgryte	Stockholm
17:30 CEST	Okkels 8'; Hegland 60'; Une (yellow card) 79'	Report	Hofvander 66'; Ekblom 90+1'	Stadium: 3Arena; Attendance: 20,184; Referee: (Sweden) Richard Sundell

28 October 2026 Match 26	Göteborg	1-1	Djurgården	Gothenburg
19:00 CET	Žugelj 39'; Ackermann (yellow card) 45+6'	Report	Hegland 59'	Stadium: Gamla Ullevi; Attendance: 16,785; Referee: (Sweden) Adam Ladebäck

===== November =====
1 November 2026 Match 27	Djurgården	2-1	Degerfors	Stockholm
14:00 CET	Johansson 4'; Stensson (yellow card) 28'; Rosenqvist 39'	Report	Fritzson (yellow card) 12' (goal) 75'; Faqa (yellow card) 80'; Taranis (yellow card) 90+3'	Stadium: 3Arena; Attendance: 17,100; Referee: (Sweden) Oscar Johnson

8 November 2026 Match 28	Halmstad	2-1	Djurgården	Halmstad
14:00 CET	Faraj 22'; Illary 87'	Report	Okkels 56'; Une (yellow card) 61'; Langhoff (yellow card) 67'	Stadium: Örjans Vall; Attendance: 5,320; Referee: (Sweden) Victor Wolf

22 November 2026 Match 29	Sirius	v	Djurgården	Uppsala
14:00 CET				Stadium: Studenternas IP

29 November 2026 Match 30	Djurgården	v	Häcken	Stockholm
00:00 CET				Stadium: 3Arena

=== 2025–26 Svenska Cupen ===
==== Matches ====
===== Group stage =====
Pos	Team	Pld	W	D	L	GF	GA	GD	Pts	Qualification	DIF	BRO	FAL	IFK
1	Djurgårdens IF	3	2	0	1	10	2	+8	6	Advance to Knockout stage		2–0	0–2	
2	IF Brommapojkarna	3	2	0	1	7	3	+4	6				4–1	
3	Falkenbergs FF	3	2	0	1	6	5	+1	6					3–2
4	IFK Skövde	3	0	0	3	2	14	−12	0		0–8	0–3		

Updated to match(es) played on 8 March 2026. Source: SvFF
Rules for classification: 1) Points; 2) Goal difference; 3) Goals scored; 4) Head-to-head record; 5) Lowest disciplinary points; 6) Highest ranked team

21 February 2026 Match 1	Djurgården	0-2	Falkenberg	Stockholm
13:00 CET	Anderson (yellow card) 15'; Larsson (yellow card) 68'	Report	Sangare (yellow card) 14'; Lindberg (yellow card) 42'; Komano 59'; Andersson 86'	Stadium: 3Arena; Attendance: 12,066; Referee: (Sweden) Adam Ladebäck

1 March 2026 Match 2	IFK Skövde	0-8	Djurgården	Skövde
15:00 CET	Abraham (yellow card) 3'; Klebe (yellow card) 8'; Salihovic (yellow card) 42'; Olsson (yellow card) 55'	Report	Žugelj 6' 39' 81'; Fallenius 33' 69'; Hegland 35'; Finndell (yellow card) 42'; Anderson (penalty missed) 87 90+4'; Okkels 90'	Stadium: Södermalms IP; Attendance: 2,307; Referee: (Sweden) Fredrik Oppong

8 March 2026 Match 3	Djurgården	2-0	Brommapojkarna	Stockholm
12:00 CET	Lien 2' 29'; Johansson (yellow card) 46'	Report	Isso (yellow card) 20'; Ackermann (yellow card) 22'	Stadium: 3Arena; Attendance: 15,403; Referee: (Sweden) Mohammed Al-Hakim

===== Quarter-final =====
15 March 2026 Quarter-final	Hammarby	1-0	Djurgården	Stockholm
16:00 CET	Karlsson (yellow card) 61'; Skoglund (yellow card) 87'; Abraham 90+1'; Besara (yellow card) 90+7'	Report	Larsson (yellow card) 5'; Une (yellow card) 38'; Siltanen (yellow card) 90+6'; Anderson (yellow card) 90+7'; Jawla (yellow card) 90+10'	Stadium: 3Arena; Attendance: 26,490; Referee: (Sweden) Joakim Sars

=== 2026–27 Svenska Cupen ===
==== Qualification ====
Djurgården were drawn away at IFK Haninge in the 2nd round of the 2026-27 Svenska Cupen on 20 May 2026.

10 September 2026 Round 2	IFK Haninge	1-7	Djurgården	Stockholm
19:00 CEST	Dibba 2'; Wikström (yellow card) 28'; Jammeh (yellow card) 58'; Jajić (yellow card) 75' (yellow-red card) 88'	Report	Larsson 29' (penalty missed) 76; A Johansson 45' 85'; Alexander Andersson 76'; Almyras (yellow card) 70' (goal) 79' (pen.); Rosenqvist 86'; Agbejoye 90+1'	Stadium: Stockholms stadion Attendance: 12,632; Referee: (Sweden) Erik Enerholm

== Statistics ==
=== Appearances ===
Last updated: 8 November 2026.

No.	Pos.	Name	Allsvenskan		2025–26 Svenska Cupen		2026–27 Svenska Cupen		Total	
No.	Pos.	Name	Apps	Goals	Apps	Goals	Apps	Goals	Apps	Goals
Goalkeepers
30	GK	(Sweden) Lukas Jonsson	0	0	0	0	1	0	1	0
35	GK	(Sweden) Jacob Rinne	27	0	2	0	0	0	29	0
45	GK	(Serbia) Filip Manojlović	1	0	2	0	0	0	3	0
Defenders
2	DF	(Sweden) Piotr Johansson	22+5	2	3	0	0+1	0	25+6	2
3	DF	(Sweden) Leon Hien	1+4	0	0+1	0	0	0	1+5	0
4	DF	(Sweden) Jacob Une	22+1	1	3	0	0	0	25+1	1
5	DF	(Finland) Miro Tenho	25	2	4	0	0	0	29	2
18	DF	(Finland) Adam Ståhl	17+7	1	1	0	1	0	19+7	1
21	DF	(Sweden) Mikael Marqués	9+8	1	1+3	0	1	0	11+11	1
24	DF	(Sweden) Max Larsson	16+5	0	4	0	1	1	21+5	1
25	DF	(Germany) Daryl Tschoumy Nana	0	0	0	0	1	0	1	0
Midfielders
6	MF	(Denmark) Peter Langhoff	3+14	0	1+2	0	1	0	5+16	0
7	MF	(Greece) Christos Almyras	2+12	1	0	0	1	1	3+12	2
8	MF	(Sweden) Patric Åslund	23+4	6	1+3	0	0+1	0	24+8	6
13	MF	(Sweden) Daniel Stensson	12+7	0	0	0	0	0	12+7	0
17	MF	(Sweden) Ahmed Saeed	0+4	0	0+2	0	0	0	0+6	0
19	MF	(Denmark) Jeppe Okkels	14+13	5	1+2	1	0	0	15+15	6
20	MF	(Finland) Matias Siltanen	27+1	0	4	0	0	0	31+1	0
28	MF	(Sweden) Alexander Andersson	1+3	0	0	0	1	1	2+3	1
29	MF	(Sweden) Alexander Johansson	0+3	0	0	0	1	2	1+3	2
Forwards
9	FW	(Norway) Kristian Lien	28	16	4	2	0	0	32	18
10	FW	(England) Abdul Abdulmalik	0+2	0	0	0	0+1	0	0+3	0
11	FW	(Sweden) Oskar Fallenius	10+13	2	3+1	2	1	0	14+14	4
14	FW	(Sweden) Charlie Rosenqvist	3+6	1	0	0	0+1	1	3+7	2
16	FW	(Norway) Bo Hegland	28	11	3+1	1	0	0	31+1	12
23	FW	(Slovenia) Nino Žugelj	0+7	1	2+1	3	0	0	2+8	4
25	FW	(Sweden) Kalipha Jawla	0	0	0+1	0	0	0	0+1	0
26	FW	(Nigeria) Angelo Agbejoye	0	0	0	0	0+1	1	0+1	1
27	FW	(Norway) Sander Ringberg	0+1	0	0	0	1	0	1+1	0
Players transferred out during the season
10	MF	(Iceland) Mikael Anderson	2+2	2	2+1	1	0	0	4+3	3
14	MF	(Sweden) Hampus Finndell	14+1	1	3	0	0	0	17+1	1
22	FW	(Sweden) Joel Asoro	1+11	2	0	0	0	0	1+11	2

=== Goalscorers ===
The list is sorted by shirt number when total goals are equal.

Rnk	Pos	No.	Player	Allsvenskan	2025–26 Svenska Cupen	2026–27 Svenska Cupen	Total
1	FW	9	(Norway) Kristian Lien	16	2	0	18
2	FW	16	(Norway) Bo Hegland	11	1	0	12
3	MF	8	(Sweden) Patric Åslund	6	0	0	6
3	MF	19	(Denmark) Jeppe Okkels	5	1	0	6
5	FW	23	(Slovenia) Nino Žugelj	1	3	0	4
6	FW	10	(Iceland) Mikael Anderson	2	1	0	3
6	FW	11	(Sweden) Oskar Fallenius	1	2	0	3
8	DF	2	(Sweden) Piotr Johansson	2	0	0	2
8	DF	5	(Finland) Miro Tenho	2	0	0	2
8	MF	7	(Greece) Christos Almyras	1	0	1	2
8	FW	14	(Sweden) Charlie Rosenqvist	1	0	1	2
8	FW	22	(Sweden) Joel Asoro	2	0	0	2
8	MF	29	(Sweden) Alexander Johansson	0	0	2	2
14	DF	4	(Sweden) Jacob Une	1	0	0	1
14	FW	11	(Sweden) Oskar Fallenius	1	0	0	1
14	MF	14	(Sweden) Hampus Finndell	1	0	0	1
14	DF	18	(Finland) Adam Ståhl	1	0	0	1
14	DF	21	(Sweden) Mikael Marqués	1	0	0	1
14	DF	24	(Sweden) Max Larsson	0	0	1	1
14	FW	26	(Nigeria) Angelo Agbejoye	0	0	1	1
14	MF	28	(Sweden) Alexander Andersson	0	0	1	1
Total				55	10	7	72

==== Hat-tricks ====
Key
Score	The score is at the time of the goals.		
(H)	Djurgården were the home team.	(A)	Djurgården were the away team.

Pos.	Nat.	Player	Minutes	Score	Result	Opponent	Competition	Date
FW	(Slovenia)	Nino Žugelj	6', 39', 81'	0-1, 0-4, 0-6	0-8 (A)	IFK Skövde	Svenska Cupen	1 March 2026
FW	(Norway)	Kristian Lien	13', 53', 55'	2-0, 4-0, 5-0	6-0 (H)	Västerås SK	Allsvenskan	3 August 2026

==== Own goals ====
Player	Against	Competition	Minute	Score after own goal	Result	Date
(Sweden) Jacob Rinne	(Sweden) Elfsborg	Allsvenskan	88'	2-1	2–1 (A)	22 April 2026

=== Disciplinary ===
Updated 8 November 2026
The list is sorted by shirt number when total cards are equal.

Rnk	Pos	No.	Name	Allsvenskan			2025–26 Svenska Cupen			2026–27 Svenska Cupen			Total		
Rnk	Pos	No.	Name	Yellow card	Second yellow card	Red card	Yellow card	Second yellow card	Red card	Yellow card	Second yellow card	Red card	Yellow card	Second yellow card	Red card
1	DF	5	(Finland) Miro Tenho	6	0	0	0	0	0	0	0	0	6	0	0
1	DF	24	(Sweden) Max Larsson	4	0	0	2	0	0	0	0	0	6	0	0
3	DF	4	(Sweden) Jacob Une	4	0	0	1	0	0	0	0	0	5	0	0
4	MF	7	(Greece) Christos Almyras	1	0	1	0	0	0	1	0	0	2	0	1
4	MF	13	(Sweden) Daniel Stensson	3	0	0	0	0	0	0	0	0	3	0	0
4	MF	20	(Finland) Matias Siltanen	3	0	0	1	0	0	0	0	0	4	0	0
4	DF	21	(Sweden) Mikael Marqués	2	0	1	0	0	0	0	0	0	2	0	1
7	MF	14	(Sweden) Hampus Finndell	2	0	0	1	0	0	0	0	0	3	0	0
9	DF	2	(Sweden) Piotr Johansson	1	0	0	1	0	0	0	0	0	2	0	0
9	MF	6	(Denmark) Peter Langhoff	2	0	0	0	0	0	0	0	0	2	0	0
9	MF	10	(Iceland) Mikael Anderson	0	0	0	2	0	0	0	0	0	2	0	0
9	FW	16	(Norway) Bo Hegland	2	0	0	0	0	0	0	0	0	2	0	0
9	DF	18	(Finland) Adam Ståhl	2	0	0	0	0	0	0	0	0	2	0	0
14	DF	3	(Sweden) Leon Hien	1	0	0	0	0	0	0	0	0	1	0	0
14	FW	9	(Norway) Kristian Lien	1	0	0	0	0	0	0	0	0	1	0	0
14	FW	11	(Sweden) Oskar Fallenius	1	0	0	0	0	0	0	0	0	1	0	0
14	MF	19	(Denmark) Jeppe Okkels	1	0	0	0	0	0	0	0	0	1	0	0
14	FW	22	(Sweden) Joel Asoro	1	0	0	0	0	0	0	0	0	1	0	0
14	FW	25	(Sweden) Kalipha Jawla	0	0	0	1	0	0	0	0	0	1	0	0
Total				37	0	2	9	0	0	1	0	0	47	0	2

=== Clean sheets ===
The list is sorted by shirt number when total clean sheets are equal.

Rnk	No.	Player	Allsvenskan	2025–26 Svenska Cupen	2026–27 Svenska Cupen	Total
1	35	(Sweden) Jacob Rinne	13	0	0	13
2	45	(Serbia) Filip Manojlović	0	2	0	2
Total			13	2	0	15
