= 2025 Djurgårdens IF season =

2025 Djurgårdens IF Fotboll season

Djurgårdens IF Fotboll
2025 season
- Chairman: Erik Gozzi
- Head coach: Jani Honkavaara
- Stadium: 3Arena
- Allsvenskan: 5th
- 2024–25 Svenska Cupen: Group stage
- 2025–26 Svenska Cupen: Quarter-final
- 2024–25 UEFA Conference League: Semi-final
- Top goalscorer: League: August Priske (18); All: August Priske (19)
- Highest home attendance: 28,785 v Malmö; 29 March 2025
- Lowest home attendance: 12,301 v Öster; 24 April 2025
- Average home league attendance: 19,400
- Biggest win: 8-2 v Sirius; 29 September 2025
- Biggest defeat: 4–0 v Elfsborg; 19 May 2025
Home colours	Away colours	Third colours
- All statistics correct as of 9 November 2025.

The 2025 season was Djurgårdens IF's 125th in existence, their 70th season in Allsvenskan and their 25th consecutive season in the league. In addition to the Allsvenskan, they competed in the 2024–25 and the 2025–26 editions of the Svenska Cupen, and continued their 2024–25 UEFA Conference League campaign in the round of 16 after finishing 5th in the league phase.

== Review ==
Djurgården returned to Salobre for their winter training camp for the fourth consecutive season. Djurgården started the competitive season with the 2024–25 Svenska Cupen group stage – drawn with IFK Göteborg, Oddevold and Sandvikens IF, the team started with a 2–0 home win against Sandviken.

== Squad ==
=== Season squad ===
Squad no.	Name	Nationality	Position	Date of birth (age)	Previous club	Apps	Goals
Goalkeepers
30	Malkolm Nilsson Säfqvist	(Sweden)	GK	3 August 1993 (age 32)	(Sweden) Halmstads BK	4	0
35	Jacob Rinne	(Sweden)	GK	20 June 1993 (age 33)	(Saudi Arabia) Al Fateh SC	31	0
45	Filip Manojlović	(Serbia)	GK	25 April 1996 (age 30)	(Bosnia and Herzegovina) Borac Banja Luka	24	0
50	Bernard Eide	(Norway)	GK	24 August 2008 (age 17)	(Sweden) IF Brommapojkarna	0	0
Defenders
2	Piotr Johansson	(Sweden)	DF	28 February 1995 (age 31)	(Sweden) Kalmar FF	108	3
3	Marcus Danielson	(Sweden)	DF	8 April 1989 (age 37)	(China) Dalian Professional	202	22
4	Jacob Une (C)	(Sweden)	DF	8 April 1994 (age 32)	(Sweden) IF Brommapojkarna	255	13
5	Miro Tenho	(Finland)	DF	2 April 1995 (age 31)	(Finland) HJK Helsinki	73	2
12	Theo Bergvall	(Sweden)	DF	21 September 2004 (age 21)	(Sweden) IF Brommapojkarna	30	0
18	Adam Ståhl	(Finland)	FW	8 October 1994 (age 31)	(Sweden) Mjällby AIF	57	6
21	Mikael Marqués	(Sweden)	DF	8 September 2001 (age 24)	(Sweden) Västerås SK	0	0
27	Keita Kosugi	(Japan)	DF	18 March 2006 (age 20)	(Japan) Shonan Bellmare	62	6
33	Joshua Mambu	(Sweden)	DF	26 May 2007 (age 19)	(Sweden) Djurgården Youth	0	0
36	Alieu Atlee Manneh	(Sweden)	DF	20 August 2006 (age 19)	(Sweden) Djurgården Youth	4	0
38	Melvin Vučenović Persson	(Sweden)	DF	3 January 2007 (age 19)	(Sweden) Djurgården Youth	1	0
Midfielders
6	Rasmus Schüller	(Finland)	MF	18 June 1991 (age 35)	(Finland) HJK Helsinki	149	4
8	Albin Ekdal	(Sweden)	MF	28 July 1989 (age 36)	(Italy) Spezia	42	0
13	Daniel Stensson	(Sweden)	MF	24 March 1997 (age 29)	(Sweden) IK Sirius	39	2
14	Hampus Finndell	(Sweden)	MF	6 June 2000 (age 26)	(Norway) Viking FK	112	15
16	Bo Hegland	(Norway)	MF	18 June 2004 (age 22)	(Norway) Moss FK	4	1
19	Jeppe Okkels	(Denmark)	MF	27 July 1999 (age 26)	(England) Preston North End	8	4
20	Matias Siltanen	(Finland)	MF	29 March 2007 (age 19)	(Finland) KuPS	32	0
22	Patric Åslund	(Sweden)	MF	1 August 2002 (age 23)	(Sweden) Västerås	36	6
34	Alexander Andersson	(Sweden)	MF	25 April 2010 (age 16)	(Sweden) IF Brommapojkarna	1	0
37	Carl Selfvén	(Sweden)	MF	30 March 2007 (age 19)	(Sweden) Djurgården Youth	1	0
Forwards
9	August Priske	(Denmark)	FW	23 March 2004 (age 22)	(Denmark) Midtjylland	52	23
10	Tokmac Nguen	(Norway)	FW	20 October 1993 (age 32)	(Hungary) Ferencváros	68	20
11	Zakaria Sawo	(Sweden)	FW	11 January 2000 (age 26)	(Cyprus) Aris Limassol	18	1
15	Oskar Fallenius	(Sweden)	FW	1 November 2001 (age 24)	(Denmark) Brøndby IF	94	8
17	Mikael Anderson	(Iceland)	FW	1 July 1998 (age 28)	(Denmark) AGF	15	5
23	Nino Žugelj	(Slovenia)	FW	23 May 2000 (age 26)	(Norway) Bodø/Glimt	14	3
31	Ahmed Saeed	(Sweden)	FW	22 April 2008 (age 18)	(Sweden) Karlslund	2	0
Away on loan
19	Viktor Bergh	(Sweden)	DF	27 June 1999 (age 27)	(Sweden) IFK Värnamo	26	0
24	Frank Odhiambo	(Kenya)	DF	29 October 2002 (age 23)	(Kenya) Gor Mahia	0	0
25	Kalipha Jawla	(Sweden)	FW	11 April 2006 (age 20)	(Sweden) Huddinge IF	5	0
28	Gideon Granström	(Sweden)	MF	8 August 2005 (age 20)	(Sweden) Sickla IF	0	0
29	Santeri Haarala	(Finland)	FW	17 December 1999 (age 26)	(Finland) Ilves	37	2
40	Max Croon	(Sweden)	GK	26 November 2005 (age 20)	(Sweden) Viggbyholms IK	0	0

Last updated: 9 November 2025.
Source: []

== Transfers ==
=== Loans in ===
Date from	Position	Nationality	Name	From	Date until	Ref.

=== Loans out ===
Date from	Position	Nationality	Name	To	Date until	Ref.
19 February 2025	MF	(Sweden)	Gideon Granström	(Sweden) Östersund	End of season	
19 February 2025	DF	(Denmark)	Peter Therkildsen	(Poland) Widzew Łódź	2 June 2025	
14 March 2025	DF	(Kenya)	Frank Odhiambo	(Sweden) Karlstad	End of season	
27 March 2025	FW	(Sweden)	Kalipha Jawla	(Sweden) Östersund	9 May 2025	
16 July 2025	GK	(Sweden)	Max Croon	(Sweden) Östersund	End of season	
4 August 2025	DF	(Sweden)	Philip Rolke	(Sweden) Östersund	End of season	
7 August 2025	DF	(Sweden)	Viktor Bergh	(Germany) Hansa Rostock	30 June 2026	
15 August 2025	FW	(Sweden)	Kalipha Jawla	(Sweden) Utsiktens	End of season	
29 August 2025	FW	(Finland)	Santeri Haarala	(Sweden) Degerfors	End of season	
29 December 2025	FW	(Sweden)	Zakaria Sawo	(Cyprus) AEL Limassol	30 June 2026	

=== Transfers in ===
Date from	Position	Nationality	Name	From	Fee	Ref.
15 January 2025	MF	(Sweden)	Hampus Finndell	(Norway) Viking	Undisclosed	
23 January 2025	MF	(Finland)	Matias Siltanen	(Finland) KuPS	€1,200,000	
1 February 2025	DF	(Sweden)	Mikael Marqués	(Sweden) Västerås	Undisclosed	
5 February 2025	FW	(Slovenia)	Nino Žugelj	(Norway) Bodø/Glimt	Undisclosed	
25 March 2025	FW	(Sweden)	Zakaria Sawo	(Cyprus) Aris Limassol	Undisclosed	
26 March 2025	GK	(Serbia)	Filip Manojlović	(Bosnia and Herzegovina) Borac Banja Luka	Undisclosed	
26 June 2025	FW	(Iceland)	Mikael Anderson	(Denmark) AGF	Undisclosed	
27 June 2025	MF	(Norway)	Bo Hegland	(Norway) Moss	Undisclosed	
29 August 2025	MF	(Denmark)	Jeppe Okkels	(England) Preston North End	Undisclosed	
6 December 2025	DF	(Sweden)	Leon Hien	(Sweden) Degerfors	Undisclosed	

=== Transfers out ===
Date from	Position	Nationality	Name	To	Fee	Ref.
18 February 2025	MF	(Sweden)	Magnus Eriksson	(Sweden) Stockholm Internazionale	Undisclosed	
8 March 2025	FW	(Turkey)	Deniz Hümmet	(Japan) Gamba Osaka	Undisclosed	
2 June 2025	DF	(Denmark)	Peter Therkildsen	(Poland) Widzew Łódź	Undisclosed	
1 September 2025	MF	(Sweden)	Isak Alemayehu	(England) Queens Park Rangers	£60,000	
2 September 2025	MF	(Norway)	Tobias Gulliksen	(Austria) Rapid Wien	Undisclosed	
18 December 2025	DF	(Japan)	Keita Kosugi	(Germany) Eintracht Frankfurt	Undisclosed	

=== Released ===
Date from	Position	Nationality	Name	To	Notes	Ref.
13 January 2025	MF	(Sweden)	Besard Šabović	(United States) Austin FC	End of contract	(Note: After being released, Šabović signed for Austin FC.)
7 February 2025	MF	(Norway)	Gustav Wikheim	(Denmark) FC Nordsjælland	End of contract	(Note: After being released, Wikheim signed for FC Nordsjælland.)
28 November 2025	MF	(Sweden)	Albin Ekdal		End of contract	
28 November 2025	MF	(Finland)	Rasmus Schüller		End of contract	

- Note: Players will join other clubs after being released or terminated from their contract. Only the following clubs are mentioned when that club signed the player in the same transfer window.

== Competitions ==
=== Overview ===
Competition	First match	Last match	Starting round	Final position	Record							
Competition	First match	Last match	Starting round	Final position	Pld	W	D	L	GF	GA	GD	Win %
Allsvenskan	29 March 2025	9 November 2025	Matchday 1	5th	30	13	10	7	52	32	+20	43.33
2024–25 Svenska Cupen	10 October 2024	2 March 2025	Round 2	Group stage	3	1	1	1	7	6	+1	33.33
2025–26 Svenska Cupen	13 August 2025	15 March 2026	Round 2	Quarter-final	1	1	0	0	4	1	+3	100.00
2024–25 UEFA Conference League	25 July 2024	8 May 2025	2nd Qualifying Round	Semi-final	6	2	0	4	8	8	+0	33.33
Total					40	17	11	12	71	47	+24	42.50

Last updated: 15 March 2026
Source: Soccerway

=== Club friendlies ===
25 January 2025 Friendly	(Sweden) Västerås SK	3–3	Djurgården (Sweden)	Västerås
14:00 CET	S. Johansson 19'; Offia 22'; Granström 56' (o.g.)	Report	Kosugi 9'; Hümmet 36'; Finndell 39'	Stadium: Hitachi Energy Arena; Referee: (Sweden) Jasmin Svraka

2 February 2025 Friendly	(Sweden) Mjällby	1–2	Djurgården (Sweden)	Las Palmas
15:00 CET	Røjkjær 8'	Report	Priske 48'; Åslund 82'	Stadium: Ciudad deportiva de Barranco Seco

8 February 2025 Friendly	(Sweden) Djurgården	0–2	Ilves (Finland)	Stockholm
15:00 CET		Report	Söderbäck 48'; Jukkola 90+3'	Stadium: 3Arena; Attendance: 4,437; Referee: (Sweden) Rambod Beigi

21 March 2025 Friendly	(Sweden) Djurgården	0–1	KuPS (Finland)	Lidingö
13:00 CET	Ekdal (yellow card) 62'	Report	Antwi (yellow card) 39'; Savolainen 81'; Unknown (yellow card) 66'	Stadium: Lidingövallen; Referee: (Sweden) Richard Sundell

=== Allsvenskan ===
==== League table ====
Pos	Team	Pld	W	D	L	GF	GA	GD	Pts	Qualification or relegation
3	GAIS	30	14	10	6	45	30	+15	52	Qualification for the Conference League second qualifying round
4	IFK Göteborg	30	16	3	11	41	33	+8	51	Qualification for the Conference League second qualifying round
5	Djurgårdens IF	30	13	10	7	52	32	+20	49	
6	Malmö FF	30	13	10	7	46	33	+13	49	
7	AIK	30	13	9	8	40	33	+7	48	

Source: svenskfotboll.se (in Swedish)
Rules for classification: 1) Points; 2) Goal difference; 3) Goals scored; 4) Head-to-head points; 5) Head-to-head goal difference; 6) Head-to-head away goals scored; 7) Play-off
(Note: Play-off is only played if need to decide champion, teams for relegation or UEFA competition and will be played on a neutral ground).

==== Results summary ====
Overall								Home						Away					
Pld	W	D	L	GF	GA	GD	Pts	W	D	L	GF	GA	GD	W	D	L	GF	GA	GD
30	13	10	7	52	32	+20	49	6	7	2	30	16	+14	7	3	5	22	16	+6

Source: soccerway

==== Results by round ====
Round	1	2	3	4	5	6	7	8	9	10	11	12	13	14	15	16	17	18	19	20	21	22	23	24	25	26	27	28	29	30
Ground	H	A	A	H	H	H	A	H	A	H	A	A	H	H	A	H	A	H	A	A	H	A	H	A	H	A	A	H	H	A
Result	L	W	L	D	W	D	W	L	L	D	W	L	D	W	L	W	W	D	D	D	W	W	D	W	W	D	L	W	D	W
Position	12	9	12	12	9	11	11	6	8	11	9	9	8	8	10	9	7	8	8	8	8	8	8	7	7	6	7	7	6	5
Points	0	3	3	4	7	8	11	11	11	12	15	15	16	19	19	22	25	26	27	28	31	34	35	38	41	42	42	45	46	49

Updated to match(es) played on 9 November 2025. Source:
A = Away; H = Home; W = Win; D = Draw; L = Loss

==== Matches ====
===== March =====
29 March 2025 Match 1	Djurgården	0–1	Malmö	Stockholm
15:00 CET	Gulliksen (yellow card) 45'; Schüller (yellow card) 45+1'	Report	Kiese Thelin (yellow card) 13'; Sigurðsson (yellow card) 45'; Stryger Larsen (yellow card) 45' (goal) 45+8'; Rösler (yellow card) 45+9'; Hakšabanović (yellow card) 66'; Johnsen (yellow card) 71'	Stadium: 3Arena; Attendance: 28,785; Referee: (Sweden) Glenn Nyberg

===== April =====
5 April 2025 Match 2	Sirius	0–1	Djurgården	Uppsala
15:00 CEST	Mamatsashvili (yellow card) 45+1'	Report	Ståhl 51'; Ekdal (yellow card) 56'	Stadium: Studenternas IP; Attendance: 9,639; Referee: (Sweden) Mohammed Al-Hakim

13 April 2025 Match 3	Hammarby	2–0	Djurgården	Stockholm
14:00 CEST	Erabi 41'; M Karlsson (yellow card) 56'; Boudah 83'; Pinas (yellow card) 90+7'	Report	Sawo (yellow card) 29'; Stensson (yellow card) 87'; Haarala (yellow card) 90+6'; Priske (yellow card) 90+7'	Stadium: 3Arena; Attendance: 28,333; Referee: (Sweden) Kristoffer Karlsson

21 April 2025 Match 4	Djurgården	0–0	GAIS	Stockholm
14:00 CEST	Ekdal (yellow card) 45+1'; Priske (yellow card) 75'	Report	Milovanovic (yellow card) 28'; Lundgren (yellow card) 36'; Henriksson (yellow card) 75'	Stadium: 3Arena; Attendance: 17,978; Referee: (Sweden) Adam Ladebäck

24 April 2025 Match 5	Djurgården	1–0	Öster	Stockholm
19:00 CEST	Adolfsson 87' (o.g.)	Report	Mörfelt (yellow card) 24'	Stadium: 3Arena; Attendance: 12,301; Referee: (Sweden) Granit Maqedonci

===== May =====
4 May 2025 Match 7	Djurgården	1–1	AIK	Stockholm
14:00 CEST	Gulliksen (yellow card) 21'; Danielson 26' (pen.); Sawo (yellow card) 55'; Tenho (yellow card) 70' (yellow-red card) 80'	Report	Isherwood (yellow card) 23'; Papagiannopoulos (yellow card) 24'; Salétros 83'; Andersson (yellow card) 89'	Stadium: 3Arena; Attendance: 26,246; Referee: (Sweden) Glenn Nyberg

12 May 2025 Match 8	Göteborg	1–2	Djurgården	Gothenburg
19:10 CEST	Danielson 25' (o.g.)	Report	Nguen 5'; Finndell (yellow card) 75'; Haarala 77'; Siltanen (yellow card) 87'; Bergvall (yellow card) 90+1'; Jawla (yellow card) 90+1'	Stadium: Gamla Ullevi; Attendance: 16,872; Referee: (Sweden) Adam Ladebäck

15 May 2025 Match 9	Djurgården	1–3	Mjällby	Stockholm
19:00 CEST	Priske 15'; Gulliksen (yellow card) 59'; Une (yellow card) 89'	Report	T Pettersson 38'; Thorell (yellow card) 45+1'; Norén (yellow card) 45+3'; Stroud (yellow card) 56' (goal) 73'; Gustavsson (yellow card) 61'; A Johansson 90'	Stadium: 3Arena; Attendance: 14,585; Referee: (Sweden) Tess Olofsson

19 May 2025 Match 10	Elfsborg	4–0	Djurgården	Borås
19:10 CEST	Ihler 9' 42' 60'; Zeneli 56'	Report	Finndell (yellow card) 18'; Stensson (red card) 82'	Stadium: Borås Arena; Attendance: 10,134; Referee: (Sweden) Kristoffer Karlsson

26 May 2025 Match 11	Djurgården	1–1	Häcken	Stockholm
19:10 CEST	Priske 63'; Bergh (yellow card) 88'	Report	Gustafson 50'; Dahbo (yellow card) 67'; Andersen (yellow card) 75'; Dembe (yellow card) 89'	Stadium: 3Arena; Attendance: 16,483; Referee: (Sweden) Adi Aganovic

29 May 2025 Match 6	Brommapojkarna	0–1	Djurgården	Stockholm
18:00 CEST	Christensen (yellow card) 15'; Karlsson (yellow card) 79'; Ngouali (yellow card) 88'	Report	Gulliksen 19'; Une (yellow card) 72'; Priske (yellow card) 79'; Alemayehu (yellow card) 83'	Stadium: Grimsta IP; Attendance: 4,008; Referee: (Sweden) Richard Sundell
Note: Fixture was originally scheduled for 28 April, but postponed due to Djurgården's participation in the UEFA Conference League semi-finals.

===== June =====
1 June 2025 Match 12	Halmstad	1–0	Djurgården	Halmstad
14:00 CEST	Agnero (penalty missed) 62; Schyberg 69' (yellow card) 90+4'; Erlandsson (yellow card) 90+2'	Report	Gulliksen (yellow card) 18'; Alemayehu (yellow card) 50'; Nguen (yellow card) 90+2'	Stadium: Örjans Vall; Attendance: 6,086; Referee: (Sweden) Joakim Östling

30 June 2025 Match 13	Djurgården	1–1	Norrköping	Stockholm
19:00 CEST	Gulliksen 45+2'; Bergh (yellow card) 83'; Sawo (yellow card) 87'	Report	Nyman 59'	Stadium: 3Arena; Attendance: 20,727; Referee: (Sweden) Victor Wolf

===== July =====
6 July 2025 Match 14	Djurgården	5–1	Degerfors	Stockholm
16:30 CEST	Priske 10' 24'; Nguen 26' 53' 88' (pen.); Bergvall (yellow card) 43'; Ekdal (yellow card) 78'	Report	Rafferty 51'; Ohlsson (yellow card) 68'; Pikkarainen (yellow card) 88'; Lundgren (yellow card) 90+2'	Stadium: 3Arena; Attendance: 17,245; Referee: (Sweden) Erik Mattsson

13 July 2025 Match 15	Värnamo	1–0	Djurgården	Värnamo
16:30 CEST	Antonsson (yellow card) 61'; Adjei (yellow card) 74'; Carl Johansson (yellow card) 82'; Alsalkhadi 90+4'; Kalu (yellow card) 90+6'	Report	Manojlović (yellow card) 60'; Tenho (yellow card) 61'; Åslund (yellow card) 68'	Stadium: Finnvedsvallen; Attendance: 4,465; Referee: (Sweden) Oscar Johnson

19 July 2025 Match 16	Djurgården	1–0	Elfsborg	Stockholm
15:00 CEST	Priske 11'; Bergvall (yellow card) 22'; Une (yellow card) 50'; Manojlović (yellow card) 85'	Report	Zeneli (yellow card) 45+1'; Olsson (yellow card) 61'	Stadium: 3Arena; Attendance: 15,083; Referee: (Sweden) Joakim Östling

27 July 2025 Match 17	Häcken	1–6	Djurgården	Gothenburg
14:00 CEST	Dahbo (yellow card) 23'; Lundkvist (yellow card) 37'; Leach Holm (yellow card) 40'; Lode (red card) 50'; Layouni 66'; Gustafson (red card) 71'	Report	Tenho 10'; Nguen 18' 21'; Priske 44' 58'; Anderson (yellow card) 71'; Sawo 87'	Stadium: Bravida Arena; Attendance: 6,015; Referee: (Sweden) Richard Sundell

===== August =====
3 August 2025 Match 18	Djurgården	1–1	Halmstad	Stockholm
14:00 CEST	Erlandsson 24' (o.g.); Kosugi (yellow card) 42'; Sawo (yellow card) 89'	Report	Kaib (yellow card) 19' (yellow-red card) 82'; Granath 29'; Agnero (yellow card) 37'; Arvidsson (yellow card) 81'	Stadium: 3Arena; Attendance: 19,053; Referee: (Sweden) Mohammed Al-Hakim

10 August 2025 Match 19	AIK	0–0	Djurgården	Stockholm
14:00 CEST	Beširović (yellow card) 29'; Thychosen (yellow card) 84'	Report	Gulliksen (yellow card) 76'; Anderson (yellow card) 85'	Stadium: Strawberry Arena; Attendance: 45,922; Referee: (Sweden) Adam Ladebäck

17 August 2025 Match 20	Mjällby	1–1	Djurgården	Hällevik
16:30 CEST	Gustavsson (yellow card) 64'; Stroud (yellow card) 89'; Charles 90+5'	Report	Siltanen (yellow card) 30'; Nguen 35'; Bergvall (yellow card) 46'; Priske (yellow card) 53'; Finndell (yellow card) 68'; Kosugi (yellow card) 89'; Rinne (yellow card) 90+3'	Stadium: Strandvallen; Attendance: 5,780; Referee: (Sweden) Victor Wolf

24 August 2025 Match 21	Djurgården	1–0	Brommapojkarna	Stockholm
14:00 CEST	Priske 39'; Siltanen (yellow card) 71'	Report	Ssewankambo (yellow card) 22'; Ackermann (yellow card) 42'	Stadium: 3Arena; Attendance: 16,340; Referee: (Sweden) Kristoffer Karlsson

31 August 2025 Match 22	Norrköping	0–4	Djurgården	Norrköping
14:00 CEST	Traustason (yellow card) 15'; Baggesen (yellow card) 20'; Kalley (yellow card) 41' (yellow-red card) 44'; Brönner (yellow card) 60'	Report	Priske 27' 36'; Fallenius 66'; Finndell (yellow card) 73'; Tenho (yellow card) 84'; Žugelj 88'	Stadium: PlatinumCars Arena; Attendance: 11,632; Referee: (Sweden) Oscar Johnson

===== September =====
14 September 2025 Match 23	Djurgården	3–3	Hammarby	Stockholm
14:00 CEST	Okkels 22'; Anderson (yellow card) 24'; Karlsson 55' (o.g.); Ståhl 90+6'	Report	Karlsson 13'; Besara 16' (yellow card) 90+2'; Eriksson (yellow card) 29'; Madjed 68'; Tekie (yellow card) 81'; Hahn (yellow card) 89'	Stadium: 3Arena; Attendance: 26,694; Referee: (Sweden) Joakim Östling

20 September 2025 Match 24	Malmö	0–1	Djurgården	Malmö
15:00 CEST	Rosengren (yellow card) 12'; Stryger (yellow card) 58'	Report	Kosugi (yellow card) 58'; Schüller (yellow card) 64'; Priske 88'	Stadium: Eleda Stadion; Attendance: 18,676; Referee: (Sweden) Fredrik Klitte

29 September 2025 Match 25	Djurgården	8–2	Sirius	Stockholm
19:00 CEST	Priske 5' 19' 72'; Anderson 10' 67'; Okkels 39'; Une (yellow card) 41'; Bergvall (yellow card) 56'; Nguen 64'; Hegland 86'	Report	Krusnell (yellow card) 26'; Heier (yellow card) 27'; Bjerkebo 29'; Walta 61'; Joakim Persson (yellow card) 84'	Stadium: 3Arena; Attendance: 16,248; Referee: (Sweden) Adi Aganovic

===== October =====
4 October 2025 Match 26	Degerfors	1–1	Djurgården	Degerfors
15:00 CEST	Ndinga (yellow card) 15'; Hien (yellow card) 42'; Ohlsson (yellow card) 85'; Vukojević 89'	Report	Stensson (yellow card) 4'; Fallenius (yellow card) 11'; Ståhl (yellow card) 46'; Okkels 58'	Stadium: Stora Valla; Attendance: 3,849; Referee: (Sweden) Kristoffer Karlsson

19 October 2025 Match 27	GAIS	3–2	Djurgården	Gothenburg
14:00 CEST	Boudri (yellow card) 15' (goal) 24'; Diabate 16'; Frej 59'; de Brienne (yellow card) 74'; Holmén (yellow card) 90+1'	Report	Priske 35'; Anderson 70' (yellow card) 72'	Stadium: Gamla Ullevi; Attendance: 13,122; Referee: (Sweden) Mohammed Al-Hakim

25 October 2025 Match 28	Djurgården	6–2	Värnamo	Stockholm
15:00 CEST	Anderson 16'; Nguen 37'; Priske 50' 51'; Okkels 84'; Åslund 88'	Report	Zeljković 66'; Siltanen 81' (o.g.); Alsalkhadi (yellow card) 87'	Stadium: 3Arena; Attendance: 16,427; Referee: (Sweden) Adam Ladebäck

===== November =====
2 November 2025 Match 29	Djurgården	0–0	Göteborg	Stockholm
16:30 CET	Siltanen (yellow card) 38'; Kosugi (yellow card) 90+8'	Report	Yeboah (yellow card) 61' (yellow-red card) 66'	Stadium: 3Arena; Attendance: 26,809; Referee: (Sweden) Granit Maqedonci

9 November 2025 Match 30	Öster	1–3	Djurgården	Växjö
15:00 CET	Starke (yellow card) 38'; Aliev 45+2'; Varmanen (yellow card) 70'; Rodić (yellow card) 90+7'	Report	Ståhl 48'; Åslund 79'; Tenho (yellow card) 85'; Žugelj (yellow card) 85'; Priske 90+10'	Stadium: Visma Arena; Attendance: 9,012; Referee: (Sweden) Kristoffer Karlsson

=== 2024–25 Svenska Cupen ===
==== Matches ====
===== Group stage =====
Pos	Team	Pld	W	D	L	GF	GA	GD	Pts	Qualification	IFKG	DIF	SIF	IKO
1	IFK Göteborg	3	3	0	0	9	3	+6	9	Advance to Knockout stage			3–0	2–0
2	Djurgårdens IF	3	1	1	1	7	6	+1	4		3–4		2–0	
3	Sandvikens IF	3	1	0	2	1	5	−4	3					1–0
4	IK Oddevold	3	0	1	2	2	5	−3	1			2–2		

Source: SvFF
Rules for classification: 1) Points; 2) Goal difference; 3) Goals scored; 4) Head-to-head record; 5) Lowest disciplinary points; 6) Highest ranked team

16 February 2025 Match 1	Djurgården	2–0	Sandviken	Stockholm
16:30 CET	Åslund 1'; Stensson (yellow card) 40'; Finndell (yellow card) 41'; Hümmet 58'	Report	Simba (yellow card) 65'; Engqvist (yellow card) 85'; Kiani (yellow card) 88'	Stadium: 3Arena; Attendance: 13,127; Referee: (Sweden) Victor Wolf

23 February 2025 Match 2	Oddevold	2–2	Djurgården	Gothenburg
12:00 CET	Krezic 4'; Wiedesheim-Paul 9'; Forssell (yellow card) 43'; Engelbrektsson (yellow card) 77'	Report	Nguen 78'; Žugelj (yellow card) 90+2'; Kosugi 90+5'	Stadium: Bravida Arena; Attendance: 913; Referee: (Sweden) Fikret Buqa

2 March 2025 Match 3	Djurgården	3–4	IFK Göteborg	Stockholm
12:00 CET	Žugelj 27'; Fallenius 41'; Une (yellow card) 72'; Kosugi (yellow card) 75' (goal) 90+6'	Report	Jagne 12'; Svensson (yellow card) 33'; Fenger 45' 67'; Kruse (yellow card) 74'; Santos 86'; Carlstrand (yellow card) 90+4'	Stadium: 3Arena; Attendance: 17,731; Referee: (Sweden) Glenn Nyberg

=== 2025–26 Svenska Cupen ===
==== Qualification ====
Djurgården were drawn away at FC Järfälla in the 2nd round of the 2025-26 Svenska Cupen on 8 July 2024.

13 August 2025 Round 2	FC Järfälla	1–4	Djurgården	Stockholm
18:30 CEST	Dahir (yellow card) 20' (goal) 34'; Saweris (yellow card) 62'; Taylan (yellow card) 70'	Report	Žugelj 11'; Anderson 67' (pen.); Priske 84' (pen.); Ståhl 89'	Stadium: Stockholm Olympic Stadium; Attendance: 12,631; Referee: (Sweden) Erik Mattsson

=== 2024–25 UEFA Conference League ===
==== Round of 16 ====
Djurgården finished 5th in the league phase and qualified directly for the round of 16. The draw was made on 21 February 2025, with the matches being played on 6 and 13 March 2025. Djurgården were drawn against Pafos FC of Cyprus, with the first leg away from home.

===== Matches =====
6 March 2025 Round of 16 1st leg	Pafos FC (Cyprus)	1–0	(Sweden) Djurgården	Limassol
21:00 CET	Tanković 65'; Luckassen (yellow card) 85'; Pileas (yellow card) 90+2'	Report	Danielson (yellow card) 90+8'	Stadium: Alphamega Stadium; Attendance: 3,809; Referee: Giorgi Kruashvili (Georgia)

13 March 2025 Round of 16 2nd leg	Djurgården (Sweden)	3–0	(Cyprus) Pafos FC	Stockholm
18:45 CET	Fallenius 35'; Nguen (yellow card) 68' (goal) 86'; Stensson 69' (yellow card) 85'; Schüller (yellow card) 80'	Report	Sema (yellow card) 48'; Šunjić (yellow card) 57'; Luckassen (yellow card) 60'; Tanković (yellow card) 61'; Silva (yellow card) 82'; Pêpê (yellow card) 90+3'	Stadium: 3Arena; Attendance: 17,653; Referee: Sebastian Gishamer (Austria)

Djurgården won 3–1 on aggregate.

==== Quarter-final ====
The draw for the order of the quarter-final legs was held on 21 February 2025, 14:00 CET, after the round of 16 draw and drew Djurgården with Rapid Wien of Austria, with the first leg at home.

===== Matches =====
10 April 2025 Quarter-final 1st leg	Djurgården (Sweden)	0–1	(Austria) SK Rapid Wien	Stockholm
21:00 CEST	Finndell (yellow card) 61'	Report	Schaub (yellow card) 27'; Bolla (yellow card) 43'; Finndell 62' (o.g.); Radulović (yellow card) 90'	Stadium: 3Arena; Attendance: 23,531; Referee: Tobias Stieler (Germany)

17 April 2025 Quarter-final 2nd leg	SK Rapid Wien (Austria)	1–4 (a.e.t.)	(Sweden) Djurgården	Vienna
21:00 CEST	Sangaré (red card) 7'; Beljo (yellow card) 34'; Une 45+1' (o.g.); Seidl (yellow card) 54'; Burgstaller (yellow card) 105'; Raux-Yao (red card) 110'	Report	Nguen (yellow card) 23'; Danielson (yellow card) 38' (goal) 42' (pen.); Stensson (yellow card) 68'; Kosugi 77'; Gulliksen 93' 105'	Stadium: Allianz Stadion; Attendance: 25,600; Referee: Anthony Taylor (England)

Djurgården won 4–2 on aggregate.

==== Semi-final ====
The draw for the order of the semi-final legs was held on 21 February 2025, 14:00 CET, after the round of 16 and quarter-final draws and drew Djurgården with Chelsea of England, with the first leg away from home. The order was subsequently reversed due to Tottenham playing in London in the Europa League on the same night. The first leg was played on 1 May, with the second leg to be played on 8 May 2025.

===== Matches =====
1 May 2025 Semi-final 1st leg	Djurgården (Sweden)	1–4	(England) Chelsea	Stockholm
21:00 CEST	Alemayehu 68'; Gulliksen (yellow card) 90'	Report	Sancho 12'; Madueke 43'; Jackson 59' 65'; Caicedo (yellow card) 82'; Adarabioyo (yellow card) 90'	Stadium: 3Arena; Attendance: 26,703; Referee: Sandro Schärer (Switzerland)

8 May 2025 Semi-final 2nd leg	Chelsea (England)	1–0	(Sweden) Djurgården	London
21:00 CEST	Adarabioyo (yellow card) 17'; Dewsbury-Hall 38'	Report	Stensson (yellow card) 53'	Stadium: Stamford Bridge; Attendance: 32,464; Referee: João Pinheiro (Portugal)

Djurgården lost 1–5 on aggregate.

== Statistics ==
=== Appearances ===
Last updated: 9 November 2025.

No.	Pos.	Name	Allsvenskan		2024–25 Svenska Cupen		2025–26 Svenska Cupen		2024–25 UEFA Conference League		Total	
No.	Pos.	Name	Apps	Goals	Apps	Goals	Apps	Goals	Apps	Goals	Apps	Goals
Goalkeepers
30	GK	(Sweden) Malkolm Nilsson Säfqvist	0	0	0	0	0	0	2	0	2	0
35	GK	(Sweden) Jacob Rinne	7+1	0	3	0	0	0	4+1	0	14+2	0
45	GK	(Serbia) Filip Manojlović	23	0	0	0	1	0	0	0	24	0
Defenders
2	DF	(Sweden) Piotr Johansson	0+4	0	0	0	1	0	0	0	1+4	0
3	DF	(Sweden) Marcus Danielson	28+2	1	3	0	0	0	3+2	1	31+4	2
4	DF	(Sweden) Jacob Une	13+7	0	3	0	1	0	6	0	23+7	0
5	DF	(Finland) Miro Tenho	19+6	1	3	0	0+1	0	3+3	0	25+10	1
12	DF	(Sweden) Theo Bergvall	19+5	0	0	0	0	0	0	0	19+5	0
18	DF	(Finland) Adam Ståhl	18+6	3	3	0	0+1	1	5	0	26+7	4
19	DF	(Sweden) Viktor Bergh	3+6	0	0	0	0	0	1+2	0	4+8	0
27	DF	(Japan) Keita Kosugi	27+1	0	3	2	1	0	6	1	37+1	3
36	DF	(Sweden) Alieu Atlee Manneh	0+1	0	0	0	0	0	0+2	0	0+3	0
38	DF	(Sweden) Melvin Vučenović Persson	0	0	0	0	0	0	0+1	0	0+1	0
Midfielders
6	MF	(Finland) Rasmus Schüller	16+2	0	2	0	0	0	2	0	20+2	0
8	MF	(Sweden) Albin Ekdal	4+12	0	0+2	0	1	0	0	0	5+14	0
13	MF	(Sweden) Daniel Stensson	9+6	0	1+2	0	0	0	4+1	1	14+9	1
14	MF	(Sweden) Hampus Finndell	4+4	0	2	0	0+1	0	4+2	0	10+7	0
16	MF	(Norway) Bo Hegland	0+3	1	0	0	1	0	0	0	1+3	1
19	MF	(Denmark) Jeppe Okkels	4+4	4	0	0	0	0	0	0	4+4	4
20	MF	(Finland) Matias Siltanen	27+2	0	1+1	0	1	0	0	0	29+3	0
22	MF	(Sweden) Patric Åslund	5+12	2	2+1	1	1	0	2	0	10+13	3
34	MF	(Sweden) Alexander Andersson	0+1	0	0	0	0	0	0	0	0+1	0
37	MF	(Sweden) Carl Selfvén	0	0	0	0	0	0	0+1	0	0+1	0
Forwards
9	FW	(Denmark) August Priske	24+3	18	1+1	0	0+1	1	3+3	0	28+8	19
10	FW	(Norway) Tokmac Nguen	23+6	9	3	1	0	0	5	1	31+6	11
11	FW	(Sweden) Zakaria Sawo	5+13	1	0	0	0	0	0	0	5+13	1
15	FW	(Sweden) Oskar Fallenius	11+8	1	3	1	1	0	4	1	19+8	3
17	FW	(Iceland) Mikael Anderson	13+1	4	0	0	0+1	1	0	0	13+2	5
23	FW	(Slovenia) Nino Žugelj	0+7	1	1+2	1	1	1	3	0	5+9	3
25	FW	(Sweden) Kalipha Jawla	1+3	0	0	0	0	0	0	0	1+3	0
29	FW	(Finland) Santeri Haarala	7+5	1	0+3	0	1	0	3+2	0	11+10	1
31	FW	(Sweden) Ahmed Saeed	0+2	0	0	0	0	0	0	0	0+2	0
Players transferred out during the season
7	MF	(Norway) Tobias Gulliksen	16+2	2	1+2	0	0	0	6	2	23+4	4
11	FW	(Turkey) Deniz Hümmet	0	0	1	1	0	0	0	0	1	1
32	MF	(Sweden) Isak Alemayehu	4+6	0	0+1	0	0	0	0+4	1	4+11	1

=== Goalscorers ===
The list is sorted by shirt number when total goals are equal.

Rnk	Pos	No.	Player	Allsvenskan	2024–25 Svenska Cupen	2025–26 Svenska Cupen	2024–25 UEFA Conference League	Total
1	FW	9	(Denmark) August Priske	18	0	1	0	19
2	FW	10	(Norway) Tokmac Nguen	9	1	0	1	11
3	FW	17	(Iceland) Mikael Anderson	4	0	1	0	5
4	MF	7	(Norway) Tobias Gulliksen	2	0	0	2	4
4	DF	18	(Finland) Adam Ståhl	3	0	1	0	4
4	MF	19	(Denmark) Jeppe Okkels	4	0	0	0	4
7	FW	15	(Sweden) Oskar Fallenius	1	1	0	1	3
7	MF	22	(Sweden) Patric Åslund	2	1	0	0	3
7	FW	23	(Slovenia) Nino Žugelj	1	1	1	0	3
7	DF	27	(Japan) Keita Kosugi	0	2	0	1	3
11	DF	3	(Sweden) Marcus Danielson	1	0	0	1	2
12	DF	5	(Finland) Miro Tenho	1	0	0	0	1
12	FW	11	(Turkey) Deniz Hümmet	0	1	0	0	1
12	FW	11	(Sweden) Zakaria Sawo	1	0	0	0	1
12	MF	13	(Sweden) Daniel Stensson	0	0	0	1	1
12	MF	16	(Norway) Bo Hegland	1	0	0	0	1
12	FW	29	(Finland) Santeri Haarala	1	0	0	0	1
12	MF	32	(Sweden) Isak Alemayehu	0	0	0	1	1
Total				49	7	4	8	68

==== Hat-tricks ====
Key
Score	The score is at the time of the goals.		
(H)	Djurgården were the home team.	(A)	Djurgården were the away team.

Pos.	Nat.	Player	Minutes	Score	Result	Opponent	Competition	Date
FW	(Norway)	Tokmac Nguen	26', 53', 88'	3–0, 4–1, 5–1	5-1 (H)	Degerfors	Allsvenskan	6 July 2025
FW	(Denmark)	August Priske	5', 19', 72'	1–0, 3–0, 7–2	8-2 (H)	Sirius	Allsvenskan	29 September 2025

==== Own goals ====
Player	Against	Competition	Minute	Score after own goal	Result	Date
(Sweden) Hampus Finndell	(Austria) Rapid Wien	UEFA Conference League	62'	0–1	0–1 (H)	10 April 2025
(Sweden) Jacob Une	(Austria) Rapid Wien	UEFA Conference League	45+1'	1–1	1–4 (A)	17 April 2025
(Sweden) Marcus Danielson	(Sweden) Göteborg	Allsvenskan	25'	1–1	1–2 (A)	12 May 2025
(Finland) Matias Siltanen	(Sweden) Värnamo	Allsvenskan	81'	4–2	6–2 (H)	25 October 2025

=== Disciplinary ===
Updated 9 November 2025
The list is sorted by shirt number when total cards are equal.

Rnk	Pos	No.	Name	Allsvenskan			2024–25 Svenska Cupen			2025–26 Svenska Cupen			2024–25 UEFA Conference League			Total		
Rnk	Pos	No.	Name	Yellow card	Second yellow card	Red card	Yellow card	Second yellow card	Red card	Yellow card	Second yellow card	Red card	Yellow card	Second yellow card	Red card	Yellow card	Second yellow card	Red card
1	MF	13	(Sweden) Daniel Stensson	2	0	1	1	0	0	0	0	0	3	0	0	6	0	1
2	MF	7	(Norway) Tobias Gulliksen	5	0	0	0	0	0	0	0	0	1	0	0	6	0	0
2	MF	14	(Sweden) Hampus Finndell	4	0	0	1	0	0	0	0	0	1	0	0	6	0	0
4	DF	4	(Sweden) Jacob Une	4	0	0	1	0	0	0	0	0	0	0	0	5	0	0
4	DF	5	(Finland) Miro Tenho	3	1	0	0	0	0	0	0	0	0	0	0	3	1	0
4	DF	12	(Sweden) Theo Bergvall	5	0	0	0	0	0	0	0	0	0	0	0	5	0	0
4	DF	27	(Japan) Keita Kosugi	4	0	0	1	0	0	0	0	0	0	0	0	5	0	0
8	FW	9	(Denmark) August Priske	4	0	0	0	0	0	0	0	0	0	0	0	4	0	0
8	FW	11	(Sweden) Zakaria Sawo	4	0	0	0	0	0	0	0	0	0	0	0	4	0	0
8	FW	17	(Iceland) Mikael Anderson	4	0	0	0	0	0	0	0	0	0	0	0	4	0	0
8	MF	20	(Finland) Matias Siltanen	4	0	0	0	0	0	0	0	0	0	0	0	4	0	0
12	MF	6	(Finland) Rasmus Schüller	2	0	0	0	0	0	0	0	0	1	0	0	3	0	0
12	MF	8	(Sweden) Albin Ekdal	3	0	0	0	0	0	0	0	0	0	0	0	3	0	0
12	FW	10	(Norway) Tokmac Nguen	1	0	0	0	0	0	0	0	0	2	0	0	3	0	0
15	DF	3	(Sweden) Marcus Danielson	0	0	0	0	0	0	0	0	0	2	0	0	2	0	0
15	DF	19	(Sweden) Viktor Bergh	2	0	0	0	0	0	0	0	0	0	0	0	2	0	0
15	FW	23	(Slovenia) Nino Žugelj	1	0	0	1	0	0	0	0	0	0	0	0	2	0	0
15	MF	32	(Sweden) Isak Alemayehu	2	0	0	0	0	0	0	0	0	0	0	0	2	0	0
15	GK	45	(Serbia) Filip Manojlović	2	0	0	0	0	0	0	0	0	0	0	0	2	0	0
20	FW	15	(Sweden) Oskar Fallenius	1	0	0	0	0	0	0	0	0	0	0	0	1	0	0
20	DF	18	(Finland) Adam Ståhl	1	0	0	0	0	0	0	0	0	0	0	0	1	0	0
20	MF	22	(Sweden) Patric Åslund	1	0	0	0	0	0	0	0	0	0	0	0	1	0	0
20	FW	25	(Sweden) Kalipha Jawla	1	0	0	0	0	0	0	0	0	0	0	0	1	0	0
20	FW	29	(Finland) Santeri Haarala	1	0	0	0	0	0	0	0	0	0	0	0	1	0	0
20	GK	35	(Sweden) Jacob Rinne	1	0	0	0	0	0	0	0	0	0	0	0	1	0	0
Total				62	1	1	5	0	0	0	0	0	10	0	0	77	1	1

=== Clean sheets ===
The list is sorted by shirt number when total clean sheets are equal.

Rnk	No.	Player	Allsvenskan	2024–25 Svenska Cupen	2025–26 Svenska Cupen	2024–25 UEFA Conference League	Total
1	45	(Serbia) Filip Manojlović	8	0	0	0	8
2	35	(Sweden) Jacob Rinne	2	1	0	1	4
3	30	(Sweden) Malkolm Nilsson Säfqvist	0	0	0	1	1
Total			10	1	0	2	13
