= List of Swedish football transfers summer 2024 =

This is a list of Swedish football transfers for the 2024 summer transfer window. Only transfers featuring Allsvenskan and Superettan are listed.

== Allsvenskan ==
Note: Flags indicate national team as has been defined under FIFA eligibility rules. Players may hold more than one non-FIFA nationality.

=== Malmö ===
In:

No.	Pos.	Nation	Player
29	FW	MNE	Sead Hakšabanović (from (Scotland) Celtic, previously on loan at (England) Stoke City)

Out:

No.	Pos.	Nation	Player
—	MF	SWE	Joseph Ceesay (on loan to (Italy) Cesena, previously on loan at Norrköping)
—	MF	SWE	David Edvardsson (to (Norway) Tromsø)
—	MF	FRA	Mahamé Siby (on loan to (France) Martigues, previously on loan at (France) Bastia)
—	MF	PLE	Moustafa Zeidan (on loan to (Norway) Rosenborg)
—	FW	KOS	Patriot Sejdiu (on loan to (Netherlands) Roda JC, previously on loan at (Netherlands) NAC Breda)
—	DF	CZE	Matěj Chaluš (to (Czech Republic) Baník Ostrava, previously on loan at (Czech Republic) Slovan Liberec)
—	DF	GHA	Emmanuel Lomotey (to (Cyprus) Ethnikos Achna, previously on loan)

=== Elfsborg ===
In:

No.	Pos.	Nation	Player

Out:

No.	Pos.	Nation	Player
21	MF	SWE	André Boman (on loan to Halmstad)
—	FW	SWE	Jack Cooper Love (to (England) Burton Albion, previously on loan at GAIS)

=== Häcken ===
In:

No.	Pos.	Nation	Player
6	DF	SWE	Axel Lindahl (from Kalmar, previously on loan)

Out:

No.	Pos.	Nation	Player
8	MF	NGR	Ishaq Abdulrazak (loan return to (Belgium) Anderlecht)
13	DF	SWE	Simon Sandberg (to (Greece) Lamia)
17	FW	ZAM	Edward Chilufya (loan return to (Denmark) Midtjylland)
20	FW	JAM	Blair Turgott (to Halmstad)

=== Djurgården ===
In:

No.	Pos.	Nation	Player
18	DF	SWE	Adam Ståhl (from Mjällby)
19	DF	SWE	Viktor Bergh (from Värnamo)
22	MF	SWE	Patric Åslund (from Västerås)

Out:

No.	Pos.	Nation	Player
21	MF	SWE	Lucas Bergvall (to (England) Tottenham Hotspur)
22	FW	AZE	Musa Qurbanlı (to (Azerbaijan) Qarabağ)
26	DF	SWE	Samuel Dahl (to (Italy) Roma)
—	DF	SWE	Jesper Löfgren (to (Switzerland) Luzern, previously on loan)
—	MF	SWE	Hampus Finndell (to (Norway) Viking, previously on loan at (Germany) Eintracht Braunschweig)
—	FW	ANG	Felix Vá (to (Norway) Lillestrøm, previously on loan)

=== Värnamo ===
In:

No.	Pos.	Nation	Player
15	DF	AUT	Michael Steinwender (from (Austria) Hartberg)
21	MF	RSA	Luke Le Roux (from (Netherlands) Volendam)

Out:

No.	Pos.	Nation	Player
3	DF	SWE	Viktor Bergh (to Djurgården)
32	MF	SWE	Kenan Bilalovic (on loan to Skövde)
—	DF	BRA	Bernardo Vilar (on loan to (Kuwait) Al-Nasr, previously on loan at (Moldova) Sheriff Tiraspol)

=== Kalmar ===
In:

No.	Pos.	Nation	Player
12	DF	FRA	Ivan Inzoudine (on loan from (England) Burton Albion)
18	MF	CRO	Antonio Kujundžić (from (Croatia) Dinamo Zagreb youth)
28	FW	SWE	Max Svensson (from (Netherlands) Willem II)

Out:

No.	Pos.	Nation	Player
—	DF	SWE	Axel Lindahl (to Häcken, previously on loan)

=== Hammarby ===
In:

No.	Pos.	Nation	Player
1	GK	SUR	Warner Hahn (from (Japan) Kyoto Sanga)
4	DF	SWE	Victor Eriksson (from (United States) Minnesota United)
29	MF	LBR	Divine Teah (from (Liberia) Nimba)
—	FW	SWE	Jardell Kanga (from (Germany) Bayer Leverkusen, previously on loan at (Netherlands) De Graafschap)

Out:

No.	Pos.	Nation	Player
1	GK	SWE	Oliver Dovin (to (England) Coventry City)
4	DF	SWE	Edvin Kurtulus (to (Bulgaria) Ludogorets)
7	FW	MNE	Viktor Đukanović (on loan to (Belgium) Standard Liège)
16	MF	SWE	Marcus Rafferty (on loan to (Norway) Aalesund)
23	FW	SWE	Abdelrahman Boudah (on loan to Västerås)
24	DF	GHA	Kingsley Gyamfi (on loan to (Finland) Ekenäs IF)
—	MF	SWE	Wilgot Marshage (to Sollentuna)
—	MF	NIG	Amadou Sabo (on loan to (Finland) IFK Mariehamn, previously on loan at (Belgium) Royal Antwerp youth)
—	FW	CMR	Saidou Alioum (reloan to (Cyprus) Omonia)
—	DF	GHA	Nathaniel Adjei (to (France) Lorient, previously on loan)

=== Sirius ===
In:

No.	Pos.	Nation	Player

Out:

No.	Pos.	Nation	Player
1	GK	MKD	David Mitov Nilsson (to Norrköping)
6	MF	GER	Michael Martin (on loan to (Czech Republic) Dynamo České Budějovice)
22	MF	IRQ	André Alsanati (on loan to (Finland) AC Oulu)

=== Norrköping ===
In:

No.	Pos.	Nation	Player
23	FW	SWE	David Moberg Karlsson (from (Japan) Urawa Red Diamonds, previously on loan at (Greece) Aris Thessaloniki)
91	GK	MKD	David Mitov Nilsson (from Sirius)

Out:

No.	Pos.	Nation	Player
20	DF	NOR	Daniel Eid (to (Norway) Fredrikstad)
23	MF	SWE	Joseph Ceesay (loan return to Malmö)
30	GK	SWE	Tommi Vaiho (free agent)
—	DF	SWE	Edvin Tellgren (to Skövde, previously on loan)
—	FW	ISL	Andri Guðjohnsen (to (Denmark) Lyngby, previously on loan)

=== Mjällby ===
In:

No.	Pos.	Nation	Player

Out:

No.	Pos.	Nation	Player
11	DF	SWE	Adam Ståhl (to Djurgården)

=== AIK ===
In:

No.	Pos.	Nation	Player

Out:

No.	Pos.	Nation	Player
8	MF	MLI	Ismaila Coulibaly (loan return to (England) Sheffield United)
29	DF	KEN	Collins Sichenje (on loan to (Serbia) Vojvodina)
—	MF	IRL	Zack Elbouzedi (to (Republic of Ireland) St Patrick's Athletic, previously on loan at (England) Swindon Town)

=== Halmstad ===
In:

No.	Pos.	Nation	Player
14	FW	JAM	Blair Turgott (from Häcken)
16	MF	FIN	Niilo Mäenpää (from (Poland) Warta Poznań)
17	MF	SWE	André Boman (on loan from Elfsborg)

Out:

No.	Pos.	Nation	Player
9	FW	SWE	Viktor Granath (to Västerås)
15	DF	SWE	Gustav Friberg (on loan to Gefle)
17	DF	GHA	Phil Ofosu-Ayeh (to (Indonesia) PSS Sleman)
22	FW	SWE	Alex Hall (on loan to Skövde)
24	MF	IRQ	Amir Al-Ammari (to (Poland) Cracovia)

=== Göteborg ===
In:

No.	Pos.	Nation	Player
3	DF	SWE	August Erlingmark (from (Greece) Atromitos)
8	DF	DEN	Jonas Bager (from (Belgium) Charleroi)
12	GK	NOR	Jacob Karlstrøm (on loan from (Norway) Molde)
15	MF	DEN	David Kruse (from (France) Valenciennes)

Out:

No.	Pos.	Nation	Player
8	MF	DEN	Andreas Pyndt (loan return to (Denmark) Silkeborg)
12	GK	ISL	Adam Ingi Benediktsson (to Östersund)
15	DF	DEN	Sebastian Hausner (to (Denmark) Horsens)
30	MF	MLI	Malick Yalcouyé (to (England) Brighton & Hove Albion)

=== Brommapojkarna ===
In:

No.	Pos.	Nation	Player
2	DF	ISL	Hlynur Freyr Karlsson (from (Norway) Haugesund)
5	MF	GAB	Serge-Junior Martinsson Ngouali (from (Norway) Sarpsborg 08)
12	GK	POL	Fabian Mrozek (on loan from (England) Liverpool)

Out:

No.	Pos.	Nation	Player
2	DF	NOR	Torbjørn Heggem (to (England) West Bromwich Albion)
14	FW	SWE	Alexander Johansson (on loan to Varberg)
19	DF	MKD	Leonard Zuta (to (Croatia) Šibenik)
35	GK	FIN	Lucas Bergström (loan return to (England) Chelsea)

=== Västerås ===
In:

No.	Pos.	Nation	Player
3	DF	SWE	Gustav Granath (from (Denmark) Vejle)
5	MF	SWE	Karl Gunnarsson (from Ängelholm)
10	MF	SWE	Daniel Ask (on loan from (Denmark) AaB)
14	FW	SWE	Viktor Granath (from Halmstad)
21	DF	SWE	Victor Wernersson (from (Netherlands) NAC Breda)
22	DF	SWE	Elyas Bouzaiene (from Degerfors)
30	FW	SWE	Abdelrahman Boudah (on loan from Hammarby)

Out:

No.	Pos.	Nation	Player
3	DF	SWE	Alex Douglas (to (Poland) Lech Poznań)
9	FW	SWE	Jabir Abdihakim Ali (on loan to (Norway) Lillestrøm)
15	MF	BEL	Samuel Asoma (on loan to Trelleborg)
16	FW	SWE	Julius Johansson (on loan to Oddevold)
22	MF	SWE	Patric Åslund (to Djurgården)

=== GAIS ===
In:

No.	Pos.	Nation	Player
28	FW	SWE	Lucas Hedlund (from (Hungary) Mezőkövesd)

Out:

No.	Pos.	Nation	Player
16	FW	SWE	Jack Cooper Love (loan return to Elfsborg)
20	FW	SWE	Chisomnazu Chika Chidi (on loan to Helsingborg)

== Superettan ==
Note: Flags indicate national team as has been defined under FIFA eligibility rules. Players may hold more than one non-FIFA nationality.

=== Degerfors ===
In:

No.	Pos.	Nation	Player
12	DF	SWE	Erik Lindell (from (Denmark) AB)
20	MF	SWE	Christos Gravius (from (Greece) Athens Kallithea)

Out:

No.	Pos.	Nation	Player
3	DF	SWE	Karim Mammar (to (Algeria) MC Oran)
6	DF	SWE	Oscar Wallin (to (England) Peterborough United)
13	FW	IRQ	Pashang Abdulla (to (Iraq) Duhok SC)
16	MF	SWE	Alper Demirol (loan return to Hammarby)
20	DF	SWE	Elyas Bouzaiene (to Västerås)

=== Varberg ===
In:

No.	Pos.	Nation	Player
2	DF	SWE	Gustav Broman (from Skövde)
6	MF	SWE	Albin Winbo (from Östersund)
16	FW	SWE	Alexander Johansson (on loan from Brommapojkarna)
18	MF	SWE	Kevin Čustović (from (Slovenia) Koper)
19	FW	NED	Kevin Appiah Nyarko (from Brage)

Out:

No.	Pos.	Nation	Player
6	DF	SWE	Oliver Silverholt (on loan to Falkenberg)

=== Utsikten ===
In:

No.	Pos.	Nation	Player

Out:

No.	Pos.	Nation	Player

=== Öster ===
In:

No.	Pos.	Nation	Player
—	FW	NOR	Martin Hoel Andersen (from (Norway) Sarpsborg 08)

Out:

No.	Pos.	Nation	Player
17	DF	SWE	Adam Herdonsson (to (Denmark) Horsens)
22	MF	SWE	Oskar Gabrielsson (on loan to Oskarshamn)

=== Östersund ===
In:

No.	Pos.	Nation	Player
12	GK	ISL	Adam Ingi Benediktsson (from Göteborg)

Out:

No.	Pos.	Nation	Player
5	DF	NOR	Kevin Jablinski (to (Norway) Jerv)
29	MF	SWE	Albin Winbo (to Varberg)
30	GK	ENG	Andrew Mills (to (Northern Ireland) Glentoran)

=== Brage ===
In:

No.	Pos.	Nation	Player
33	FW	IRQ	Amar Muhsin (on loan from Helsingborg)

Out:

No.	Pos.	Nation	Player
3	DF	NOR	Eirik Asante Gayi (to (Norway) Sandnes Ulf)
9	FW	NED	Kevin Appiah Nyarko (to Varberg)

=== Landskrona ===
In:

No.	Pos.	Nation	Player

Out:

No.	Pos.	Nation	Player
9	FW	DEN	Frederik Ihler (to (Norway) Molde)
17	FW	SWE	Samuel Burakovsky (to (Norway) Bodø/Glimt)

=== Trelleborg ===
In:

No.	Pos.	Nation	Player
14	MF	BEL	Samuel Asoma (on loan from Västerås)
24	MF	SWE	Viktor Christiansson (free agent)

Out:

No.	Pos.	Nation	Player
9	FW	DEN	Nicolas Mortensen (to (Denmark) AB Tårnby)
12	MF	DEN	Zander Hyltoft (to (Denmark) Hobro)
37	MF	SWE	Karl Wendt (to (Poland) Lechia Gdańsk)

=== Gefle ===
In:

No.	Pos.	Nation	Player
12	MF	SWE	Henrik Bellman (from (Denmark) Næstved)
15	DF	SWE	Gustav Friberg (on loan from Halmstad)

Out:

No.	Pos.	Nation	Player
10	FW	SYR	Antonio Yakoub (to Nordic United)

=== Sundsvall ===
In:

No.	Pos.	Nation	Player

Out:

No.	Pos.	Nation	Player
30	MF	SWE	Dušan Jajić (free agent)

=== Örebro ===
In:

No.	Pos.	Nation	Player
70	MF	SWE	Erik Andersson (from (Denmark) Helsingør)
99	FW	IRQ	Ahmed Yasin (from (Saudi Arabia) Al-Kholood)

Out:

No.	Pos.	Nation	Player

=== Helsingborg ===
In:

No.	Pos.	Nation	Player
22	FW	SWE	Chisomnazu Chika Chidi (on loan from GAIS)

Out:

No.	Pos.	Nation	Player
5	DF	SWE	Simon Bengtsson (on loan to (Finland) AC Oulu)
8	MF	IRQ	Sumar Almadjed (free agent)
33	FW	IRQ	Amar Muhsin (on loan to Brage)

=== Skövde ===
In:

No.	Pos.	Nation	Player
5	MF	SWE	Kenan Bilalovic (on loan from Värnamo)
12	FW	SWE	Alex Hall (on loan from Halmstad)
18	DF	SWE	Edvin Tellgren (from Norrköping, previously on loan)

Out:

No.	Pos.	Nation	Player
5	DF	SWE	Gustav Broman (to Varberg)
—	FW	SWE	Jacob Shamoun (to Jönköping, previously on loan)

=== Örgryte ===
In:

No.	Pos.	Nation	Player

Out:

No.	Pos.	Nation	Player

=== Sandviken ===
In:

No.	Pos.	Nation	Player
20	FW	SWE	Oscar Sjöstrand (from Sollentuna)

Out:

No.	Pos.	Nation	Player
24	MF	SWE	Lukas Vikgren (to Umeå)

=== Oddevold ===
In:

No.	Pos.	Nation	Player
22	FW	SWE	Julius Johansson (on loan from Västerås)

Out:

No.	Pos.	Nation	Player
2	DF	HKG	Alexander Jojo (on loan to (Hong Kong) Eastern)
24	FW	UGA	John Paul Dembe (loan return to Häcken)

== See also ==
- 2024 Allsvenskan
- 2024 Superettan
