= Miro Tenho =

Finnish footballer (born 1995)

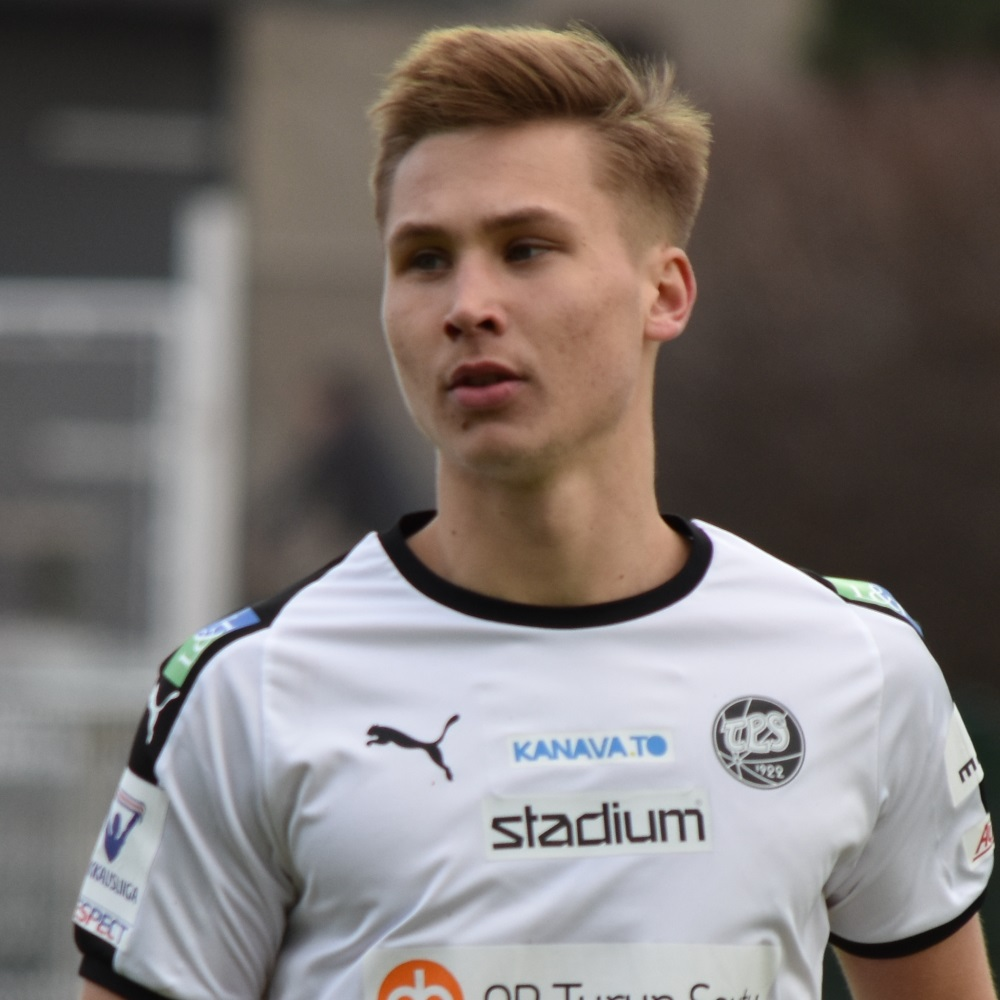
- Tenho with TPS in 2018

Personal information
- Date of birth: 2 April 1995 (age 31)
- Place of birth: Kaarina, Finland
- Height: 1.88 m (6 ft 2 in)
- Position: Centre-back

Team information
- Current team: Djurgården
- Number: 5

Youth career
- KaaNa
- KaaPo
- PiPS
- –2012: FC Kaarina
- 2013: TPS

Senior career*
Years	Team	Apps	(Gls)
2013	Åbo IFK	13	(1)
2014–2018	TPS	135	(1)
2019	Inter Turku	24	(1)
2020–2023	HJK	75	(8)
2024–	Djurgården	74	(4)

International career^{‡}
2022–	Finland	17	(0)
- * Club domestic league appearances and goals as of 11 October 2026 ‡ National team caps and goals as of 13 November 2026

Miro Tenho (born 2 April 1995) is a Finnish professional footballer who plays as a centre-back for Allsvenskan team Djurgården and the Finland national team.

== Club career ==
Born in Kaarina, Tenho played in various youth teams in Kaarina and Turku area, before starting his senior career with Åbo IFK in 2013, playing in the third-tier league Kakkonen.

=== TPS and Inter Turku ===
Next season he joined Turun Palloseura (TPS) first team for the 2014 Veikkausliiga season.

At the end of the 2018 season, TPS were once again relegated back to Ykkönen, and Tenho joined the local rival Veikkausliiga club Inter Turku on 3 January 2019, after having represented TPS for five seasons. Tenho played 31 games and scored twice for Inter Turku in all competitions combined, before leaving at the end of the year.

=== HJK Helsinki ===
HJK Helsinki confirmed on 4 November 2019, that Tenho would join the club for the 2020 season, signing a deal until the end of 2021. He extended his contract with HJK on 28 June 2021, signing a deal until the end of the 2023 season. Since the beginning of 2022, Tenho was the captain of the HJK team. Tenho represented HJK in the group stages of UEFA Europa Conference League and UEFA Europa League in three consecutive seasons between 2021 and 2023. During his time with the club, Tenho and HJK won four consecutive Finnish championship titles, one Finnish Cup and one Finnish League Cup.

=== Djurgårdens IF ===
On 20 December 2023, it was announced that Tenho had departed HJK and signed for Swedish side Djurgården on a three-year deal. On 19 February 2024, Tenho made his official debut for Djurgården in a Svenska Cupen match against Skövde AIK, scoring a goal in a 2–0 win. On 1 April 2024, Tenho made his Allsvenskan debut in the club's opening game of the season, scoring a goal in a 4–1 away win against IFK Göteborg. Tenho played six cup matches and scored one goal, as Djurgården finished 2nd in the 2023–24 Svenska Cupen, after losing the final against Malmö FF on penalties.

== International career ==
Tenho received his first call up to the Finland senior national team in November 2021 for the 2022 FIFA World Cup qualification matches against Bosnia-Herzegovina and France, as a replacement for Juhani Ojala, but remained an unused substitute.

He made his national team debut on 26 March 2022, in a 1–1 friendly draw against Iceland. Tenho made his competitive international debut on 14 June 2022, in a 3–2 away loss to Bosnia-Herzegovina in the 2022–23 UEFA Nations League B. In addition, Tenho made his third international appearance on 19 November 2023, in a 4–0 home win against Northern Ireland, in the UEFA Euro 2024 qualifying campaign.

== Career statistics ==
=== Club ===
As of 10 May 2026

Appearances and goals by club, season and competition
Club	Season	League			National Cup (Note: Includes Suomen Cup and Svenska Cupen)		League cup (Note: Includes Finnish League Cup)		Europe		Total	
Club	Season	Division	Apps	Goals	Apps	Goals	Apps	Goals	Apps	Goals	Apps	Goals
ÅIFK	2013	Kakkonen	13	1	—		—		—		13	1
TPS	2014	Veikkausliiga	31	1	1	0	2	0	—		34	1
TPS	2015	Ykkönen	24	0	3	1	—		—		27	1
TPS	2016	Ykkönen	21	0	2	0	—		—		23	0
TPS	2017	Ykkönen	26	0	5	2	—		—		31	2
TPS	2018	Veikkausliiga	33	0	5	0	—		—		38	0
TPS	Total		135	1	16	3	2	0	0	0	153	4
Inter Turku	2019	Veikkausliiga	24	1	5	1	—		2 (Note: Appearances in UEFA Europa League)	0	31	2
HJK	2020	Veikkausliiga	14	1	8	0	—		—		22	1
HJK	2021	Veikkausliiga	24	2	5	0	—		12 (Note: Appearances in UEFA Champions League, UEFA Europa League and UEFA Europa Conference League)	1	41	3
HJK	2022	Veikkausliiga	21	2	2	0	3	0	10 (Note: Appearances in UEFA Champions League and UEFA Europa League)	0	36	2
HJK	2023	Veikkausliiga	16	3	1	0	3	0	12	0	32	3
HJK	Total		75	8	16	0	6	0	34	1	133	9
Djurgården	2024	Allsvenskan	27	1	6	1	—		6 (Note: Appearance(s) in UEFA Conference League)	0	41	2
Djurgården	2025	Allsvenskan	25	1	3	0	—		6	0	34	1
Djurgården	2026	Allsvenskan	7	1	5	0	—		—		12	1
Djurgården	Total		59	3	14	1	0	0	12	0	85	4
Career total			286	13	51	5	8	0	48	1	382	20

=== International ===
As of match played 12 November 2026

National team	Year	Competitive		Friendly		Total	
National team	Year	Apps	Goals	Apps	Goals	Apps	Goals
Finland	2022	1 (Note: Appearances in the 2022–23 UEFA Nations League B.)	0	1	0	2	0
Finland	2023	1 (Note: Appearances in the UEFA Euro 2024 qualification.)	0	0	0	1	0
Finland	2024	1 (Note: Appearances in the UEFA Euro 2024 qualification.)	0	0	0	1	0
Finland	2025	7 (Note: Appearances in the 2026 FIFA World Cup qualification.)	0	1	0	8	0
Finland	2026	2 (Note: Appearances in the 2026–27 UEFA Nations League C.)	0	3 (Note: Includes one appearance in the 2026 FIFA Series.)	0	5	0
Total		11	0	5	0	17	0

== Honours ==
Djurgården

- Svenska Cupen runner-up: 2023–24

HJK Helsinki

- Veikkausliiga: 2020, 2021, 2022, 2023
- Finnish Cup: 2020
- Finnish Cup runner-up: 2021
- Finnish League Cup: 2023

Inter Turku

- Veikkausliiga runner-up: 2019

TPS

- Ykkönen: 2017
- Ykkönen runner-up: 2016

Finland

- FIFA Series: 2026

Individual

- Veikkausliiga Team of the Year: 2022
