= Keita Kosugi =

Japanese footballer (born 2006)

Keita Kosugi 小杉 啓太
Personal information
- Date of birth: 18 March 2006 (age 20)
- Place of birth: Kamakura, Japan
- Height: 1.72 m (5 ft 8 in)
- Position: Left back

Team information
- Current team: Eintracht Frankfurt
- Number: 26

Youth career
- 2012–2017: Nishikamakura SC
- 2018–2023: Shonan Bellmare

Senior career*
Years	Team	Apps	(Gls)
2024–2026	Djurgårdens IF	42	(1)
2026–	Eintracht Frankfurt	7	(0)

International career^{‡}
2023	Japan U17	10	(0)
2024	Japan U19	4	(0)
2025–	Japan U20	5	(0)
2025–	Japan U23	4	(1)
Medal record
Men's football
Representing Japan
Asian Games
Silver medal – second place	2026 Aichi–Nagoya
- * Club domestic league appearances and goals as of 1 November 2026 ‡ National team caps and goals as of 30 September 2026

Keita Kosugi (小杉 啓太, Kosugi Keita; born 18 March 2006) is a Japanese professional footballer who plays as a defender for Bundesliga club Eintracht Frankfurt.

== Early life ==
Kosugi was born on 18 March 2006 in Kamakura, Japan. As a youth player, Kosugi joined the youth academy Nishikamakura SC, of Kanagawa, Japan. Subsequently, he joined the youth academy of Japanese side Shonan Bellmare.

== Club career ==
From the youth team of Shonan Bellmare, Kosugi went on trial with Djurgården in March 2024. On 22 March 2024, a couple of days after his 18th birthday, Kosugi signed with Djurgården on a four-year contract after two weeks of trial. He made his Allsvenskan debut against Elfsborg on 12 May 2024. Kosugi received limited play time in the first half of the season, as Djurgården also had left back Samuel Dahl in the squad.

With Dahl sold to Roma, Kosugi's play time increased. From September to November, Kosugi started in eleven of the league matches. He scored his first goal for the club in a 1–1 tie against Kalmar FF on 6 October. During his first season in Djurgården, Kosugi made 14 league appearances and scored one goal. In December 2024, he scored the first goal in Djurgården's 2–1 away win over Víkingur of Iceland in the 2024–25 UEFA Conference League league phase.

Djurgården started the 2025 season with the 2024–25 Svenska Cupen group stage where Kosugi, in the second match day, scored the equaling 2–2 goal against second-tier team Oddevold in the 90+5th minute, saving one point to Djurgården.

On 18 December 2025, Kosugi signed a contract with German club Eintracht Frankfurt, effective 1 January 2026.

== International career ==
Kosugi was selected for Japan for the 2023 AFC U-17 Asian Cup in Thailand. He played all matches for the team that eventually won the cup with a 3–0 win against South Korea in the final. Kosugi was again selected for Japan for the 2023 FIFA U-17 World Cup later in the year. He played four matches for during the tournament in Indonesia. In May 2024, Kosugi was called up for the 2024 Maurice Revello Tournament with the Japan national under-20 football team.

== Personal life ==
In a 2024 interview, Kosugi stated that he saw Yuto Nagatomo as football role model.

== Career statistics ==
As of match played 1 November 2026

Appearances and goals by club, season and competition
Club	Season	League			Cup		Europe		Total	
Club	Season	Division	Apps	Goals	Apps	Goals	Apps	Goals	Apps	Goals
Djurgårdens IF	2024	Allsvenskan	14	1	0	0	10 (Note: Appearances in UEFA Europa Conference League)	1	24	2
Djurgårdens IF	2025	Allsvenskan	28	0	4	2	6	1	38	3
Djurgårdens IF	Total		42	1	4	2	16	2	62	5
Eintracht Frankfurt	2026–27	Bundesliga	7	0	2	0	—		9	0
Career total			49	1	6	2	16	2	71	5
