= Santeri Haarala =

Finnish footballer (born 1999)

- Haarala with HJK in 2026

Personal information
- Date of birth: 17 December 1999 (age 26)
- Place of birth: Tampere, Finland
- Height: 1.80 m (5 ft 11 in)
- Position: Winger

Team information
- Current team: HJK
- Number: 29

Youth career
- Ilves

Senior career*
Years	Team	Apps	(Gls)
2017–2019	Ilves	20	(0)
2018	→ HJS (loan)	7	(2)
2019	RoPS	1	(0)
2019	RoPS II	1	(0)
2020	Ilves II	5	(8)
2020	TPS	13	(4)
2021–2022	KuPS	39	(4)
2023–2024	Ilves	43	(18)
2024–2026	Djurgården	23	(2)
2025	→ Degerfors (loan)	9	(0)
2026–	HJK	16	(6)
- * Club domestic league appearances and goals as of 12 November 2026

Santeri Haarala (born 17 December 1999) is a Finnish professional footballer who plays as a winger for Veikkausliiga club HJK.

== Career ==
On 7 August 2019, Haarala left Ilves to join a fellow Veikkausliiga club Rovaniemen Palloseura (RoPS) on a contract for the rest of 2019. He suffered a groin injury and managed to play only one game with the first team before a surgery. His contract was not extended and left the club at the end of the year. Eventually, his recovery from the injury lasted almost eight months.

After a short spell with the reserve team of his former club Ilves in the third-tier Kakkonen, Haarala joined Veikkausliiga club TPS in August 2020 on a deal for the rest of the season.

During 2021–2022, Haarala played for Veikkausliiga club Kuopion Palloseura, where he won two Finnish Cup titles.

Haarala returned to his former club Ilves for the 2023 season, and helped Ilves to win the 2023 Finnish Cup title. On 29 February 2024 he signed a new three-year deal with the club.

On 22 August 2024, Haarala joined Allsvenskan club Djurgården on a three-and-a-half-year contract, for an undisclosed fee. Three days later, in his Allsvenskan debut for Djurgården, Haarala provided an assist to a winning goal, in a 1–0 away win over Sirius. He scored his first goal for the club on 19 September, in a 2–1 win over BK Häcken. On 12 May 2025, after failing to contribute to the scoresheet for months, Haarala was a main contributor for Djurgården's 2–1 away win against IFK Göteborg, providing the assist for his team's first goal and later scoring the game winner, when playing his first full 90 minutes in the 2025 Allsvenskan season.

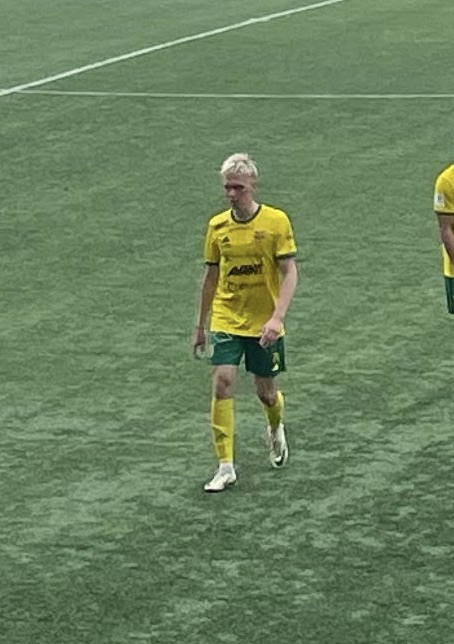
Haarala with Ilves in 2024.

In the summer 2026, Haarala moved back to Finland to play for HJK signing a long-term contract.

== International career ==
Haarala was never part of Finland youth national teams at any age level.

On 2 September 2024, he received his first call-up to the Finland senior national team by the head coach Markku Kanerva, as a replacement to Daniel Håkans, for the 2024–25 UEFA Nations League B matches against Greece and England.

== Personal life ==
Haarala meditates frequently in his everyday life.

== Career statistics ==
As of 1 May 2025

Appearances and goals by club, season and competition
Club	Season	Division	League		Cup (Note: Includes Suomen Cup and Svenska Cupen)		League cup (Note: Includes Finnish League Cup)		Europe		Total	
Club	Season	Division	Apps	Goals	Apps	Goals	Apps	Goals	Apps	Goals	Apps	Goals
Ilves II	2016	Kolmonen	2	0	–		–		–		2	0
Ilves II	2017	Kolmonen	20	7	–		–		–		20	7
Ilves II	2018	Kolmonen	0	0	–		–		–		0	0
Ilves II	2019	Kakkonen	8	2	–		–		–		8	2
Ilves II	Total		30	9	0	0	0	0	0	0	30	9
Ilves	2017	Veikkausliiga	1	0	–		–		–		1	0
Ilves	2018	Veikkausliiga	19	0	4	1	–		1 (Note: Includes UEFA Europa League)	0	24	1
Ilves	2019	Veikkausliiga	0	0	3	0	–		–		3	0
Ilves	Total		20	0	7	1	0	0	1	0	28	1
HJS (loan)	2018	Kakkonen	7	2	–		–		–		7	2
RoPS	2019	Veikkausliiga	1	0	–		–		–		1	0
RoPS II	2019	Kakkonen	1	1	–		–		–		1	1
Ilves II	2020	Kakkonen	5	8	–		–		–		5	8
TPS	2020	Veikkausliiga	15	4	–		–		–		15	4
KuPS	2021	Veikkausliiga	25	4	6	4	–		6 (Note: Includes UEFA Conference League)	0	37	8
KuPS	2022	Veikkausliiga	14	0	3	0	2	0	2	0	21	0
KuPS	Total		39	4	9	4	2	0	8	0	57	8
Ilves	2023	Veikkausliiga	26	8	6	3	4	0	–		36	11
Ilves	2024	Veikkausliiga	17	10	1	2	6	5	4	1	28	18
Ilves	Total		43	18	7	5	10	5	4	1	64	29
Djurgården	2024	Allsvenskan	11	1	0	0	–		5	0	16	1
Djurgården	2025	Allsvenskan	6	1	2	0	–		5	0	13	1
Djurgården	Total		17	2	2	0	0	0	10	0	29	2
Career total			178	48	25	10	12	5	23	1	238	63

== Honours ==
KuPS

- Veikkausliiga runner-up: 2021, 2022
- Finnish Cup: 2021, 2022

Ilves

- Finnish Cup: 2019, 2023

Individual

- Veikkausliiga Team of the Year: 2023, 2024
- Veikkausliiga Player of the Month: July 2024
