= Peter Langhoff =

Danish footballer

Personal information
- Full name: Peter Langhoff
- Date of birth: 2 January 2004 (age 22)
- Place of birth: Lundtofte, Denmark
- Height: 1.78 m (5 ft 10 in)
- Positions: Midfielder; right-back

Team information
- Current team: Djurgårdens IF
- Number: 6

Youth career
- Lundtofte BK
- Lyngby

Senior career*
| Years | Team | Apps | (Gls) |
| 2024–2026 | Lyngby | 35 | (0) |
| 2026– | Djurgårdens IF | 14 | (0) |
- * Club domestic league appearances and goals as of 16 October 2026

Peter Langhoff (born 2 January 2004) is a Danish footballer who plays as a midfielder or right-back for Allsvenskan club Djurgårdens IF.

== Club career ==
=== Lyngby ===
Langhoff is a product of Lyngby Boldklub, which he joined as a U8 player from the partner club Lundtofte Boldklub. Here he worked his way up through the youth ranks and slowly began the step up to the first team of 2023, where he was twice selected for first team matches, but without making his debut.

In the winter start-up 2024, Langhoff trained regularly with the first team and also attended a training camp.

In June 2024, Langhoff signed a two-year professional contract and was promoted to the first team squad. On August 11, 2024, in the 86th minute against FC Nordsjælland, Langhoff made his official debut when he replaced Frederik Gytkjær.

=== Djurgårdens ===
On 2 February 2026, Langhoff signed for Allsvenskan club Djurgårdens IF, joining the Swedish club on a contract running until the end of 2029.
