= Theo Bergvall =

Swedish footballer (born 2004)

Personal information
- Full name: Theo Andreas Bergvall
- Date of birth: 21 September 2004 (age 22)
- Place of birth: Stockholm, Sweden
- Height: 1.85 m (6 ft 1 in)
- Position: Right-back

Team information
- Current team: Lausanne-Sport
- Number: 6

Youth career
- 2011–2022: IF Brommapojkarna

Senior career*
Years	Team	Apps	(Gls)
2022	IF Brommapojkarna	16	(1)
2023–2025	Djurgårdens IF	28	(0)
2024	→ IF Brommapojkarna (loan)	8	(1)
2026–	Lausanne-Sport	15	(0)

International career^{‡}
2022	Sweden U19	3	(0)
2025	Sweden U21	1	(0)
- * Club domestic league appearances and goals as of 13 September 2026 ‡ National team caps and goals as of 14 October 2025

Theo Andreas Bergvall (born 21 September 2004) is a Swedish professional footballer who plays as a right-back for Swiss Super League club Lausanne-Sport.

== Career ==
Bergvall has represented the Sweden under-19 team.

After joining IF Brommapojkarna, Bergvall made his debut for the P18 national team in the 2–1 victory against Iceland on September 24, 2022. Later that fall, Bergvall was also part of the team that qualified for the 2023 UEFA Under-19 Championship.

He joined Djurgårdens IF after the 2022 season.

== Personal life ==
He has two younger brothers, Lucas and Rasmus, who are also professional footballers.

== Career statistics ==
=== Club ===
As of match played 13 September 2026

Club	Season	League			Cup		Europe		Total	
Club	Season	Division	Apps	Goals	Apps	Goals	Apps	Goals	Apps	Goals
Brommapojkarna	2022	Superettan	16	1	0	0	—		16	1
Djurgårdens	2023	Allsvenskan	2	0	0	0	—		2	0
Djurgårdens	2024	Allsvenskan	2	0	2	0	0	0	4	0
Djurgårdens	2025	Allsvenskan	24	0	0	0	0	0	24	0
Djurgårdens	Total		28	0	2	0	0	0	30	0
Brommapojkarna (loan)	2024	Allsvenskan	8	1	—		—		8	1
Lausanne-Sport	2025–26	Swiss Super League	9	0	—		1	0	10	0
Lausanne-Sport	2026–27	Swiss Super League	6	0	1	0	—		7	0
Lausanne-Sport	Total		15	0	1	0	1	0	17	0
Career total			67	2	3	0	1	0	71	2
