= Alexander Andersson (footballer, born 2010) =

Swedish footballer (born 2010)

Personal information
- Full name: Alexander Gustav Andersson
- Date of birth: 25 April 2010 (age 16)
- Place of birth: Stockholm, Sweden
- Position: Midfielder

Team information
- Current team: Djurgården
- Number: 28

Youth career
- 2014–2016: Djurgården
- 2016–2024: BP
- 2024–2026: Djurgården

Senior career*
Years	Team	Apps	(Gls)
2025–	Djurgården	5	(0)

International career^{‡}
2025–	Sweden U17	21	(5)
- * Club domestic league appearances and goals as of 16 October 2026 ‡ National team caps and goals as of 28 September 2026

Alexander Gustav Andersson (born 25 April 2010) is a Swedish professional footballer who plays as a midfielder for Djurgården.

== Career ==
As a youth player, Andersson joined the youth academy of BP. Following his stint there, he joined the youth academy of Djurgården and was promoted to the club's senior team in 2025. Swedish news website FotbollDirekt wrote in 2025 that he was "one of Sweden's most exciting players" while playing for the club.
