= Kristian Lien (footballer) =

Norwegian footballer (born 2001)

Personal information
- Full name: Kristian Strømland Lien
- Date of birth: 30 September 2001 (age 25)
- Place of birth: Flekkefjord, Norway
- Height: 1.88 m (6 ft 2 in)
- Position: Forward

Team information
- Current team: Djurgårdens IF
- Number: 9

Youth career
- –2018: Flekkefjord
- 2018–2019: Start

Senior career*
Years	Team	Apps	(Gls)
2017–2018	Flekkefjord	19	(10)
2019	Start	1	(0)
2020	→ Flekkerøy (loan)	10	(0)
2021–2022	Flekkerøy	38	(14)
2022–2023	Mjøndalen	25	(11)
2023–2026	Groningen	15	(1)
2024	→ Kristiansund (loan)	14	(2)
2025	→ HamKam (loan)	30	(11)
2026–	Djurgårdens IF	24	(17)
- * Club domestic league appearances and goals as of 16 October 2026

Kristian Strømland Lien (born 30 September 2001) is a Norwegian footballer who plays as a forward for Djurgårdens IF in Allsvenskan.

== Life and career ==
Lien was born on 30 September 2001 in Flekkefjord, Norway. He studied economics. As a youth player, Lien joined the youth academy of Norwegian side Flekkefjord FK. He started his senior career with the club. He made nineteen league appearances and scored twelve goals while playing for them. In 2018, he signed for Norwegian side Start. He was described as "impressed for the Start juniors" while playing for the club. He made one league appearance and scored zero goals while playing for them.

In 2020, he was sent on loan to Norwegian side Flekkerøy. In 2021, he signed for the club. He made forty-eight league appearances and scored fourteen goals while playing for the club. In 2022, he signed for Norwegian side Mjøndalen. By mid-July, he was the top scorer of the 2023 Norwegian First Division with ten goals.

In 2023, he signed for Dutch side Groningen. In 2024, he was sent on loan to Norwegian side Kristiansund. On 22 January 2025, Lien moved on a new loan to HamKam until the end of 2025.

== Career statistics ==
As of 24 October 2026

Appearances and goals by club, season and competition
Club	Season	League			National Cup (Note: Includes Norwegian Cup, KNVB Cup)		Total	
Club	Season	Division	Apps	Goals	Apps	Goals	Apps	Goals
Flekkefjord	2017	4. divisjon	12	7	0	0	12	7
Flekkefjord	2018	4. divisjon	7	3	0	0	7	3
Flekkefjord	Total		19	10	0	0	19	10
Start	2019	1. divisjon	1	0	0	0	0	0
Flekkerøy (loan)	2020	2. divisjon	10	0	—		10	0
Flekkerøy	2021	2. divisjon	24	2	3	0	27	2
Flekkerøy	2022	2. divisjon	14	12	2	0	16	12
Flekkerøy	Total		38	14	5	0	43	14
Mjøndalen	2022	1. divisjon	10	1	0	0	10	1
Mjøndalen	2023	1. divisjon	15	10	2	3	17	13
Mjøndalen	Total		25	11	2	3	27	14
Groningen	2023–24	Eerste Divisie	15	1	1	0	16	1
Kristiansund (loan)	2024	Eliteserien	14	2	0	0	14	2
HamKam (loan)	2025	Eliteserien	30	11	4	4	34	15
Djurgården	2026	Allsvenskan	24	17	3	2	27	19
Career total			176	66	15	9	191	75

== Honours ==
Individual

- Norwegian First Division Young Player of the Month: May 2023
