= André Boman =

Swedish footballer (born 2001)

Personal information
- Full name: André Peder Boman
- Date of birth: 15 November 2001 (age 24)
- Place of birth: Varberg, Sweden
- Position: Midfielder

Team information
- Current team: Halmstads BK
- Number: 17

Youth career
- 2018: Varbergs BoIS

Senior career*
Years	Team	Apps	(Gls)
2017	Lilla Träslövs FF	3	(0)
2019–2022	Varbergs BoIS	40	(0)
2019	→ Varbergs GIF (loan)	8	(1)
2020	→ Varbergs GIF (loan)	13	(2)
2021	→ Ullareds IK (loan)	5	(0)
2023–2024	IF Elfsborg	11	(0)
2024	→ Halmstads BK (loan)	17	(0)
2025–	Halmstads BK	27	(0)

International career^{‡}
2023	Sweden	1	(0)
- * Club domestic league appearances and goals as of 9 July 2026 ‡ National team caps and goals as of 9 January 2023

André Peder Boman (born 15 November 2001) is a Swedish professional footballer who plays as a midfielder for Allsvenskan club Halmstads BK.

== Career ==
On 7 December 2022, Boman was included in Sweden's squad for their January tour of 2023 in Portugal, with matches scheduled against Finland and Iceland. He made his full international debut for Sweden on 9 January 2023, playing for 90 minutes in a friendly 2–0 win against Finland.

== Career statistics ==
=== International ===
Appearances and goals by national team and year
National team	Year	Apps	Goals
Sweden	2023	1	0
Total		1	0
