= Matias Siltanen =

Finnish footballer (born 2007)

Personal information
- Full name: Arttu Matias Siltanen
- Date of birth: 29 March 2007 (age 19)
- Place of birth: Kuopio, Finland
- Height: 1.73 m (5 ft 8 in)
- Position: Central midfielder

Team information
- Current team: Djurgårdens IF
- Number: 20

Youth career
- –2022: KuPS

Senior career*
| Years | Team | Apps | (Gls) |
| 2022–2023 | KuPS II | 26 | (2) |
| 2023–2024 | KuPS | 27 | (1) |
| 2025– | Djurgårdens IF | 53 | (0) |

International career^{‡}
| 2021–2022 | Finland U15 | 5 | (0) |
| 2022–2023 | Finland U16 | 10 | (0) |
| 2023–2024 | Finland U17 | 14 | (4) |
| 2024–2025 | Finland U19 | 7 | (1) |
| 2025– | Finland U21 | 12 | (5) |
- * Club domestic league appearances and goals as of 16 October 2026 ‡ National team caps and goals as of 6 October 2026

Arttu Matias Siltanen (born 29 March 2007) is a Finnish professional football player who plays as a central midfielder for Allsvenskan club Djurgårdens IF.

== Early career ==
Born in Kuopio, Siltanen started to play football in a youth team of the local club Kuopion Palloseura (KuPS). He made his senior debut in 2022 at the age of 15, with the club's reserve team KuPS II playing in the third-tier league Kakkonen. After the 2022 season, Siltanen received the Boy Player of the Year award from the Eastern Finland Football Association.

On 12 January 2023, Siltanen signed his first professional contract with the club, on a two-year deal with an option for an additional year. He made his first team debut with KuPS on 11 February 2023, in a Finnish League Cup loss against Ilves. In June, he spent time with Danish club AGF on trial. After the 2023 season, Siltanen was named The Boy Player of the Year by the Football Association of Finland.

== Club career ==
=== KuPS ===
On 6 April 2024, at the age of 17, Siltanen debuted in Veikkausliiga with KuPS first team, as a starter in the opening game of the 2024 season, in a 3–1 home win against HJK Helsinki. He scored his first goal in the league on 7 July, in a 3–1 home win against IF Gnistan. On 10 July, the club exercised his option for the 2025 season. On 21 September, Siltanen and KuPS won the 2024 Finnish Cup title with a 2–1 win over Inter Turku in the final. On 19 October, Siltanen and KuPS were crowned the Veikkausliiga champions, completing the club's first-ever double.

In late 2024, Siltanen was noted by the CIES Football Observatory in the list of the most notable under-20 players in the world. Subsequently, he was named among the top 60 young talents in world football by The Guardian. He became the third Finnish player to be mentioned in the said list, after Kaan Kairinen in 2015 and Sergei Eremenko in 2016.

During his debut season with KuPS first team, a 17-year-old Siltanen played in an important role and contributed in 42 matches, scoring a goal and providing five assists in total. He was also named Veikkausliiga Rookie of the Year.

=== Djurgården ===
On 23 January 2025, after attracting interest in several clubs, Manchester City and Bournemouth among others, Siltanen decided to join Allsvenskan club Djurgårdens IF in Sweden, initially signing a three-year deal for a transfer fee of €1.2 million plus bonuses. However, he could not be registered to the squad for the club's Conference League matches as his young age delayed the transfer registration in UEFA. One month later on 23 February, he made his debut for Djurgården in a Svenska Cupen match against IK Oddevold. On 29 March, Siltanen debuted in Allsvenskan, in a season opening match against Malmö FF.

== International career ==
Siltanen was part of the Finland U16 squad that won the friendly tournament Baltic Cup in July 2023.

On 4 October 2023, he was named the captain of the Finland U17 squad in the 2024 UEFA European Under-17 Championship qualification tournament. In the tournament Finland drew with Ukraine 2–2 and with Germany 1–1, before winning Liechtenstein 3–0, placing 2nd in the group and advancing to the Elite round. Siltanen played in first two games and scored a goal against Ukraine.

Siltanen was called up to the Finland U19 team for two friendly matches against Romania in September 2024.

On 30 May 2025, Siltanen received his first call-up to the Finland national football team, for the World Cup qualifying matches against Nerherlands and Poland.

== Personal life ==
His father Marko Siltanen is a former footballer who played also for KuPS in the 1990s.

== Career statistics ==
As of 6 April 2026

Appearances and goals by club, season and competition
| Club | Season | League | | | National cup (Note: Includes Suomen Cup and Svenska Cupen) | | League cup | | Europe | | Total | |
| Club | Season | Division | Apps | Goals | Apps | Goals | Apps | Goals | Apps | Goals | Apps | Goals |
|---|---|---|---|---|---|---|---|---|---|---|---|---|
| KuPS Akatemia | 2022 | Kakkonen | 11 | 0 | — | | — | | — | | 11 | 0 |
| KuPS Akatemia | 2023 | Kakkonen | 15 | 2 | — | | — | | — | | 15 | 2 |
| KuPS Akatemia | Total | | 26 | 2 | 0 | 0 | 0 | 0 | 0 | 0 | 26 | 2 |
| KuPS | 2023 | Veikkausliiga | 0 | 0 | 0 | 0 | 1 | 0 | 0 | 0 | 1 | 0 |
| KuPS | 2024 | Veikkausliiga | 27 | 1 | 5 | 0 | 6 | 0 | 4 (Note: Includes UEFA Conference League) | 0 | 42 | 1 |
| KuPS | Total | | 27 | 1 | 5 | 0 | 7 | 0 | 4 | 0 | 43 | 1 |
| Djurgårdens IF | 2025 | Allsvenskan | 29 | 0 | 3 | 0 | – | | 0 | 0 | 32 | 0 |
| Djurgårdens IF | 2026 | Allsvenskan | 1 | 0 | 4 | 0 | – | | 0 | 0 | 5 | 0 |
| Djurgårdens IF | Total | | 30 | 0 | 7 | 0 | 0 | 0 | 0 | 0 | 37 | 0 |
| Career total | | | 83 | 3 | 12 | 0 | 7 | 0 | 4 | 0 | 106 | 3 |

== Honours ==
KuPS

- Veikkausliiga: 2024
- Finnish Cup: 2024
- Finnish League Cup runner-up: 2024

Finland U16

- Baltic Cup: 2023

Individual

- Veikkausliiga Rookie of the Year 2024
- Kakkonen Group C, Midfielder of the Year: 2023
- Finnish FA: Boy Player of the Year 2023
- Eastern Finnish FA: Boy Player of the Year 2022
