= Lukas Jonsson =

Swedish footballer (born 1992)

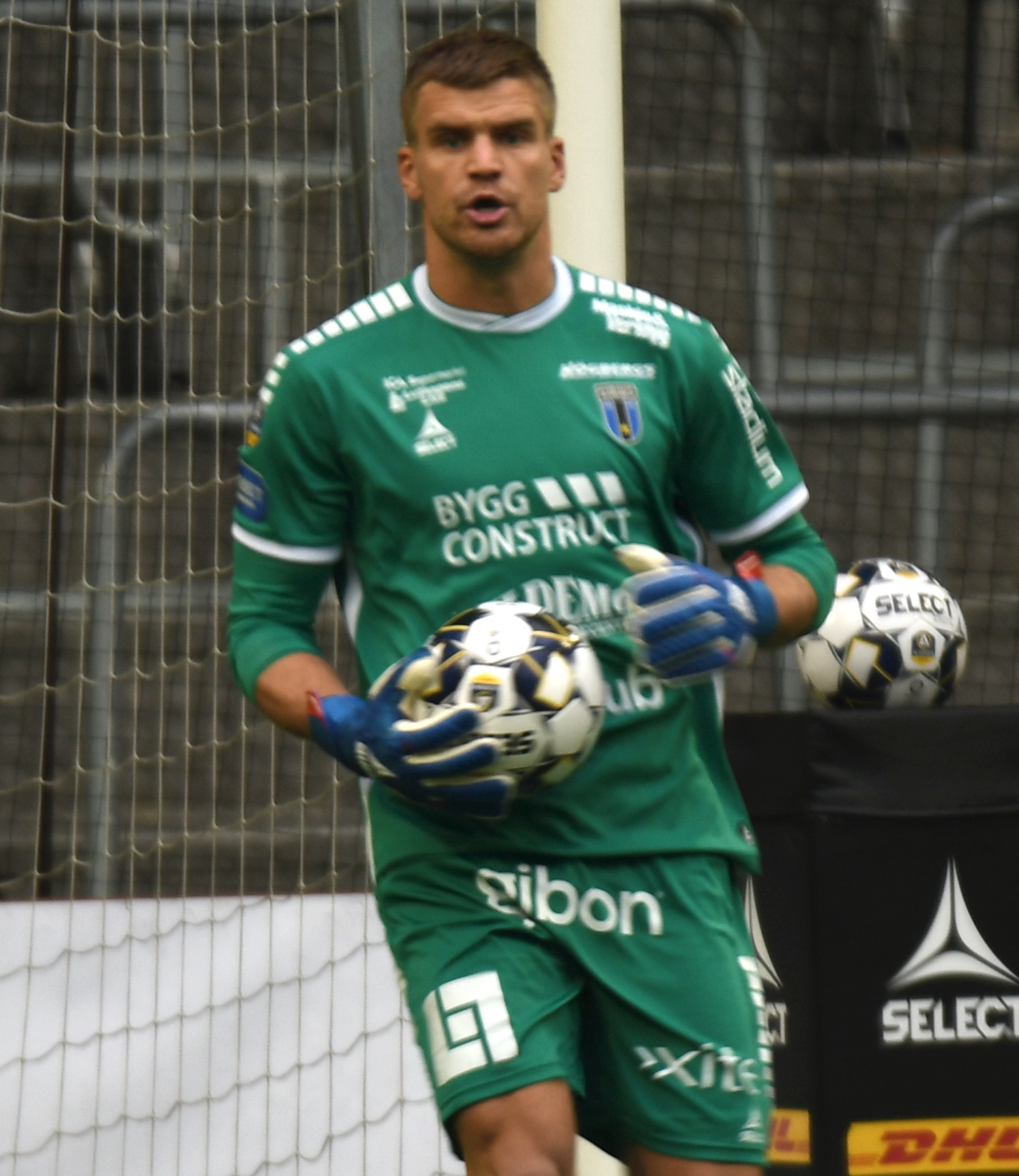
- Jonsson in 2020

Personal information
- Full name: Lukas Henrik Jonsson
- Date of birth: 21 October 1992 (age 34)
- Place of birth: Visby, Sweden
- Height: 1.91 m (6 ft 3 in)
- Position: Goalkeeper

Team information
- Current team: Djurgårdens IF
- Number: 30

Youth career
- –2008: FG 86
- 2008–2010: Norrköping
- 2011: Lindö FF

Senior career*
Years	Team	Apps	(Gls)
2012	Assyriska	21	(0)
2013–2014	Sylvia	45	(0)
2015–2021	Sirius	88	(0)
2018	→ Mjøndalen (loan)	15	(0)
2021–2023	Vendsyssel	27	(0)
2023–2024	Esbjerg fB	43	(0)
2024–2026	VfL Osnabrück	64	(0)
2026–	Djurgårdens IF	0	(0)
- * Club domestic league appearances and goals as of 28 May 2026

Lukas Jonsson (born 21 October 1992) is a Swedish professional footballer who plays as a goalkeeper for Allsvenskan club Djurgårdens IF.

== Club career ==
On 22 July 2024, Jonsson signed for German club VfL Osnabrück in the 3. Liga.

In the summer of 2026, Jonsson returned to Sweden and signed with Djurgårdens IF.

== Honours ==
Esbjerg fB

- Danish 2nd Division: 2023–24

VfL Osnabrück

- 3. Liga: 2025–26
