= Malte Frejd Pålsson =

Swedish footballer (born 2006)

Malte Frejd
Personal information
- Full name: Malte Vilhelm Frejd Pålsson
- Date of birth: 20 February 2006 (age 20)
- Place of birth: Malmö, Sweden
- Position: Centre-back

Team information
- Current team: Malmö FF
- Number: 44

Youth career
- –2021: Kvarnby IK

Senior career*
Years	Team	Apps	(Gls)
2022–2024	BK Olympic	7	(0)
2025–	Malmö FF	10	(0)

International career^{‡}
2026–	Sweden U21	1	(0)
- * Club domestic league appearances and goals as of 19 September 2026 ‡ National team caps and goals as of 17:13, 6 October 2026 (UTC)

Malte Vilhelm Frejd Pålsson (born 20 February 2006) is a Swedish professional footballer who plays as a centre-back for Allsvenskan club Malmö FF.

== Career ==
Frejd started his career as a striker at Kvarnby IK. He later joined BK Olympic, and made his senior debut in the Ettan Södra at the age of sixteen, coming on as a substitute in a 4–3 win against Qviding FIF. In 2025, he joined Malmö FF, where he began to be played more as a centre-back.

Frejd made his professional debut for the club in the final match of the 2025–26 UEFA Europa League league phase, where he played 81 minutes in a 1–2 loss against KRC Genk, with head coach Miguel Ángel Ramírez praising his performance afterwards. Following a period of injuries, on 4 July 2026, Frejd made his Allsvenskan debut in a 1–0 win against Degerfors IF, where he started alongside Andrej Đurić.

== Style of play ==
Frejd primarily plays as a centre-back, although he has also played in midfield and attack. He is left-footed and has been described as having similar attributes as former Malmö FF and Canada international defender Derek Cornelius.

== Career statistics ==
As of match played 19 September 2026

Appearances and goals by club, season and competition
Club	Season	League			Cup		Europe		Other		Total	
Club	Season	Division	Apps	Goals	Apps	Goals	Apps	Goals	Apps	Goals	Apps	Goals
BK Olympic	2022	Ettan Fotboll	1	0	—		—		—		1	0
BK Olympic	2023	Ettan Fotboll	3	0	—		—		—		3	0
BK Olympic	2024	Ettan Fotboll	3	0	—		—		—		3	0
BK Olympic	Total		7	0	—		—		—		7	0
Malmö	2026	Allsvenskan	10	0	1	0	1 (Note: Appearance in UEFA Europa League)	0	—		12	0
Career total			17	0	1	0	1	0	0	0	19	0
