= Bo Hegland =

Norwegian footballer (born 2004)

Personal information
- Full name: Bo Åsulv Hegland
- Date of birth: 18 June 2004 (age 22)
- Place of birth: Oslo, Norway
- Height: 1.85 m (6 ft 1 in)
- Position: Attacking midfielder

Team information
- Current team: Djurgården
- Number: 16

Youth career
- –2019: Frigg
- 2023: Lecce

Senior career*
Years	Team	Apps	(Gls)
2019–2022	Frigg	28	(4)
2023	Frigg	6	(1)
2023–2025	Moss	49	(13)
2025–	Djurgården	27	(10)

International career^{‡}
2025–	Norway U21	5	(1)
- * Club domestic league appearances and goals as of 16 October 2026 ‡ National team caps and goals as of 14 November 2026

Bo Åsulv Hegland (born 18 June 2004) is a Norwegian footballer who plays as an attacking midfielder for Djurgården.

== Career ==
He played youth football for Frigg and made his senior debut in the 2019 3. divisjon season, aged 15. As a child he idolized Christian Bolaños and IK Start. In 2023 Hegland spent the first sixth months in the academy of Italian club US Lecce. He made his comeback for Frigg in July 2023 and was signed by Moss FK shortly thereafter just before the summer transfer window closed.

Following 8 league goals in the 2024 1. divisjon season, which ended in playoff to the Eliteserien for Moss, Hegland averaged 0.5 goals per game across all competitions in 2025. Football pundits stated that he alone was worth buying match tickets for and that larger clubs should invest in the player. Hegland was selected for his first youth international team in 2025 with the Norway national under-21 football team. In his debut he scored once, helping Norway beat Wales 4–0.

In the summer of 2025 he was reportedly sought after by Viking and Rosenborg but ended up moving to Swedish club Djurgården. He made his first-tier debut in August 2025 against Brommapojkarna and then scored in his second outing. Due to the Allsvenskan foreign player quota Hegland ended up receiving limited playing time with the club during his first season.

In the pre-season of 2026 Hegland emerged as one of Djurgårdens penalty takers. He also scored in the 2025-26 Svenska Cupen as well as in the second match of the 2026 Allsvenskan. In April 2026 Djurgården manager Jani Honkavaara said "Bo is still a mystery to me. We're still learning how to play him.". Hegland would go on to be nominated for the leagues player of the month award in May, July and August of that season. During the summer transfer window Hegland turned down an offer from belgian club RSC Anderlecht. On 14 September 2026 he tied the record for most assists in Allsvenskan during a single season when he got his 15th assist of the year.
