= Viktor Bergh =

Swedish footballer

Personal information
- Full name: Erik Viktor Bergh
- Date of birth: 27 June 1999 (age 27)
- Height: 1.72 m (5 ft 8 in)
- Position: Left-back

Team information
- Current team: Karlsruher SC
- Number: 33

Youth career
- –2014: Forssa BK
- 2015–2016: IK Brage

Senior career*
Years	Team	Apps	(Gls)
2014	Forssa BK	4	(0)
2016–2019	IK Brage	24	(0)
2019	→ Levanger FK (loan)	24	(0)
2020–2022	Norrby IF	63	(3)
2023–2024	IFK Värnamo	42	(3)
2024–2026	Djurgårdens IF	16	(0)
2025–	→ Hansa Rostock (loan)	36	(0)
2026–	Karlsruher SC	0	(0)
- * Club domestic league appearances and goals as of 25 May 2026

Viktor Bergh (born 26 July 1999) is a Swedish footballer who plays as a left-back for 2. Bundesliga club Karlsruher SC.

== Career ==
Bergh started his youth career in Forssa BK, and played 4 games for the club in the 2014 Division 3 (fifth tier), but joined the larger Borlänge club IK Brage while still a youth player. He reached the matchday squad of Brage's senior team for the first time in September 2016, before making his senior debut in October 2016. As the team was promoted to the 2018 Superettan, Bergh made his Superettan debut that year, but in 2019 he was loaned out to Norwegian club Levanger FK.

In 2020, Bergh left Dalarna to join another Superettan club Norrby IF. Here he became a key player, starting 27 of 30 games in 2021. In the 2021 Superettan, Norrby was moments away from securing a playoff match for the Allsvenskan. Bergh scored the winning goal against Värnamo. However, Helsingborg converted a late penalty and secured the playoff berth.

In the summer of 2022, Bergh was rumoured to be approached by IK Sirius and IFK Norrköping. Bergh instead joined IFK Värnamo ahead of the 2023 season. He made his Allsvenskan debut in April 2023 against IFK Göteborg. His first Allsvenskan goal came in August 2023 against Varberg.

On 7 August 2025, Bergh was loaned by Hansa Rostock in German 3. Liga.

On 11 July 2026, Bergh signed with 2. Bundesliga club Karlsruher SC.
