= Patric Åslund =

Swedish footballer (born 2002)

Personal information
- Full name: Patric Karl Emil Åslund
- Date of birth: 1 August 2002 (age 24)
- Place of birth: Västerås, Sweden
- Position: Midfielder

Team information
- Current team: Djurgårdens IF
- Number: 22

Youth career
- –2017: Västerås IK
- 2018–2020: Västerås SK

Senior career*
Years	Team	Apps	(Gls)
2021–2024	Västerås SK	46	(5)
2021	→ IFK Eskilstuna (loan)	20	(4)
2022	→ Motala AIF (loan)	30	(10)
2024–	Djurgårdens IF	50	(10)

International career^{‡}
2024	Sweden U21	1	(0)
- * Club domestic league appearances and goals as of 16 October 2026 ‡ National team caps and goals as of 17:18, 16 October 2024 (UTC)

Patric Karl Emil Åslund (born 1 August 2002) is a Swedish professional footballer who plays as a midfielder for Djurgårdens IF.

Åslund scored ten points during Västerås SK's qualifying for Allsvenskan, and was cited as having been a major contributor to the team's success upon his signing with Djurgårdens IF.

On 8 April 2025, it was reported that Åslund had been injured during training and would likely be out the rest of the spring season.
