= 2024 Djurgårdens IF season =

Djurgarden 2024 season

Djurgårdens IF Fotboll
2024 season
- Chairman: Lars-Erik Sjöberg
- Head coach: Jani Honkavaara
- Stadium: Tele2 Arena
- Allsvenskan: 4th
- 2023–24 Svenska Cupen: Final
- 2024–25 Svenska Cupen: Group
- 2024–25 UEFA Conference League: Round of 16
- Top goalscorer: League: Deniz Hümmet (14); All: Deniz Hümmet (24)
- Highest home attendance: 27,344 v Hammarby; 2 June 2024
- Lowest home attendance: 7,559 v Skövde AIK; 19 February 2024
- Average home league attendance: 19,340
- Biggest win: 0-5 v Nordic United; 25 February 2024; 0-5 v Brommapojkarna; 16 May 2024; 1-6 v Järfälla; 10 October 2024
- Biggest defeat: 4-0 v Malmö; 1 September 2024
Home colours	Away colours	Third colours
- All statistics correct as of 19 December 2024.

The 2024 season is Djurgårdens IF's 124th in existence, their 69th season in Allsvenskan and their 24th consecutive season in the league. In addition to the Allsvenskan, they competed in the 2023–24 and the 2024–25 editions of the Svenska Cupen, and entered the 2024–25 UEFA Conference League at the 2nd Qualifying Round after finishing as runners-up in the Svenska Cupen. On 21 October, after the defeat to Hammarby, Kim Bergstrand and Thomas Lagerlöf left their positions as head coaches. A day later, it was announced that Roberth Björknesjö would take over the team until the end of the season. On 20 December, it was announced that Jani Honkavaara would be the new head coach of Djurgården.

== Squad ==
=== Season squad ===
Squad No.	Name	Nationality	Position	Date of birth (age)	Previous club	Apps	Goals
Goalkeepers
30	Malkolm Nilsson Säfqvist	(Sweden)	GK	3 August 1993 (age 33)	(Sweden) Halmstads BK	2	0
35	Jacob Rinne	(Sweden)	GK	20 June 1993 (age 33)	(Saudi Arabia) Al Fateh SC	15	0
40	Max Croon	(Sweden)	GK	26 November 2005 (age 20)	(Sweden) Viggbyholms IK	0	0
Defenders
2	Piotr Johansson	(Sweden)	DF	28 February 1995 (age 31)	(Sweden) Kalmar FF	103	3
3	Marcus Danielson	(Sweden)	DF	8 April 1989 (age 37)	(China) Dalian Professional	167	20
4	Jacob Une Larsson	(Sweden)	DF	8 April 1994 (age 32)	(Sweden) IF Brommapojkarna	225	13
5	Miro Tenho	(Finland)	DF	2 April 1995 (age 31)	(Finland) HJK Helsinki	38	1
12	Theo Bergvall	(Sweden)	DF	21 September 2004 (age 22)	(Sweden) IF Brommapojkarna	6	0
17	Peter Therkildsen	(Denmark)	DF	13 June 1998 (age 28)	(Norway) FK Haugesund	23	1
18	Adam Ståhl	(Finland)	DF	8 October 1994 (age 32)	(Sweden) Mjällby AIF	24	2
19	Viktor Bergh	(Sweden)	DF	27 June 1999 (age 27)	(Sweden) IFK Värnamo	13	0
24	Frank Odhiambo	(Kenya)	DF	29 October 2002 (age 24)	(Kenya) Gor Mahia	0	0
27	Keita Kosugi	(Japan)	DF	18 March 2006 (age 20)	(Japan) Shonan Bellmare	24	2
31	Alieu Atlee Manneh	(Sweden)	DF	20 August 2006 (age 20)	(Sweden) Djurgården Youth	1	0
32	Jack Tagesson	(Sweden)	DF	1 January 2005 (age 21)	(Sweden) Djurgården Youth	1	0
Midfielders
6	Rasmus Schüller	(Finland)	MF	18 June 1991 (age 35)	(Finland) HJK Helsinki	127	4
7	Magnus Eriksson (C)	(Sweden)	MF	8 April 1990 (age 36)	(United States) San Jose Earthquakes	211	32
8	Albin Ekdal	(Sweden)	MF	28 July 1989 (age 37)	(Italy) Spezia	23	0
9	Haris Radetinac	(Bosnia and Herzegovina)	MF	28 October 1985 (age 41)	(Sweden) Mjällby AIF	304	31
13	Daniel Stensson	(Sweden)	MF	24 March 1997 (age 29)	(Sweden) IK Sirius	16	1
14	Besard Šabović	(Sweden)	MF	5 January 1998 (age 28)	(Russia) FC Khimki	108	12
16	Tobias Gulliksen	(Norway)	MF	9 July 2003 (age 23)	(Norway) FK Bodø/Glimt	43	9
22	Patric Åslund	(Sweden)	MF	1 August 2002 (age 24)	(Sweden) Västerås	13	3
23	Gustav Wikheim	(Norway)	MF	18 March 1993 (age 33)	(Saudi Arabia) Al Fateh SC	109	19
28	Gideon Granström	(Sweden)	MF	8 August 2005 (age 21)	(Sweden) Sickla IF	0	0
33	Isak Alemayehu	(Sweden)	MF	11 October 2006 (age 20)	(Sweden) Djurgården Youth	3	0
Forwards
11	Deniz Hümmet	(Turkey)	FW	13 September 1996 (age 30)	(Sweden) Kalmar FF	48	24
15	Oskar Fallenius	(Sweden)	FW	1 November 2001 (age 25)	(Denmark) Brøndby IF	67	5
20	Tokmac Nguen	(Norway)	FW	20 October 1993 (age 33)	(Hungary) Ferencváros	31	9
25	Kalipha Jawla	(Sweden)	FW	11 April 2006 (age 20)	(Sweden) Huddinge IF	1	0
26	August Priske	(Denmark)	FW	23 March 2004 (age 22)	(Denmark) Midtjylland	16	5
29	Santeri Haarala	(Finland)	FW	17 December 1999 (age 26)	(Finland) Ilves	16	1

Last updated: 19 December 2024.
Source: []

== Transfers ==
=== Loans in ===
Date from	Position	Nationality	Name	From	Date until	Ref.

=== Loans out ===
Date from	Position	Nationality	Name	To	Date until	Ref.
18 January 2024	DF	(Sweden)	Jesper Löfgren	(Switzerland) FC Luzern	22 May 2024	
18 January 2024	MF	(Sweden)	Isak Alemayehu	(Netherlands) Feyenoord	1 July 2024	
1 February 2024	MF	(Sweden)	Hampus Finndell	(Germany) Eintracht Braunschweig	1 July 2024	
28 February 2024	MF	(Sweden)	Gideon Granström	(Sweden) FC Stockholm	1 December 2024	
28 February 2024	FW	(Sweden)	Kalipha Jawla	(Sweden) FC Stockholm	1 December 2024	
28 February 2024	DF	(Sweden)	Philip Rolke	(Sweden) FC Stockholm	26 August 2024	
13 March 2024	DF	(Kenya)	Frank Odhiambo	(Sweden) AFC Eskilstuna	1 December 2024	
26 March 2024	FW	(Angola)	Felix Vá	(Norway) Lillestrøm SK	15 May 2024	
16 May 2024	GK	(Sweden)	Max Croon	(Sweden) Sandviken	1 July 2024	
24 August 2024	DF	(Sweden)	Theo Bergvall	(Sweden) Brommapojkarna	1 December 2024	
28 February 2024	DF	(Sweden)	Philip Rolke	(Denmark) AC Horsens	1 December 2024	

=== Transfers in ===
Date from	Position	Nationality	Name	From	Fee	Ref.
30 January 2024	FW	(Turkey)	Deniz Hümmet	(Sweden) Kalmar	Undisclosed	
21 February 2024	DF	(Denmark)	Peter Therkildsen	(Norway) Haugesund	Undisclosed	
23 February 2024	MF	(Norway)	Tobias Gulliksen	(Norway) Bodø/Glimt	Undisclosed	
22 March 2024	DF	(Japan)	Keita Kosugi	(Japan) Shonan Bellmare	Undisclosed	
25 March 2024	FW	(Norway)	Tokmac Nguen	(Hungary) Ferencváros	Undisclosed	
17 June 2024	FW	(Sweden)	Patric Åslund	(Sweden) Västerås	Undisclosed	
24 July 2024	DF	(Sweden)	Viktor Bergh	(Sweden) Värnamo	Undisclosed	
24 July 2024	DF	(Finland)	Adam Ståhl	(Sweden) Mjällby	Undisclosed	
5 August 2024	FW	(Denmark)	August Priske	(Denmark) Midtjylland	Undisclosed	
12 August 2024	GK	(Sweden)	Jacob Rinne	Free agent	Free	
14 August 2024	MF	(Sweden)	Daniel Stensson	(Sweden) Sirius	Undisclosed	
21 August 2024	GK	(Sweden)	Oscar Jansson	(Sweden) Norrköping	Undisclosed	
22 August 2024	FW	(Finland)	Santeri Haarala	(Finland) Ilves	Undisclosed	

=== Transfers out ===
Date from	Position	Nationality	Name	To	Fee	Ref.
24 January 2024	DF	(Spain)	Carlos Moros Gracia	(Finland) HJK Helsinki	Undisclosed	
30 January 2024	FW	(Sweden)	Noel Milleskog	(Sweden) Sirius	Undisclosed	
16 February 2024	DF	(Tunisia)	Rami Kaib	(Sweden) Elfsborg	Undisclosed	
15 May 2024	FW	(Angola)	Felix Vá	(Norway) Lillestrøm	Undisclosed	
22 May 2024	DF	(Sweden)	Jesper Löfgren	(Switzerland) FC Luzern	Undisclosed	
14 June 2024	FW	(Azerbaijan)	Musa Qurbanlı	(Azerbaijan) Qarabağ FK	Undisclosed	
1 July 2024	MF	(Sweden)	Lucas Bergvall	(England) Tottenham Hotspur	£8.64m	
18 July 2024	MF	(Sweden)	Hampus Finndell	(Norway) Viking	Undisclosed	
28 July 2024	DF	(Sweden)	Samuel Dahl	(Italy) Roma	Undisclosed	
15 August 2024	MF	(Sweden)	Samuel Leach Holm	(Sweden) Häcken	Undisclosed	
16 August 2024	GK	(Sweden)	Jacob Widell Zetterström	(England) Derby County	Undisclosed	

=== Released ===
Date from	Position	Nationality	Name	To	Notes	Ref.
7 January 2024	DF	(Sweden)	Pierre Bengtsson		Mutual Consent	
8 January 2024	GK	(Sweden)	André Picornell		Mutual Consent	
13 January 2024	DF	(Sweden)	Axel Wallenborg		Mutual Consent	
21 December 2024	GK	(Sweden)	Oscar Jansson		Mutual Consent	

- Note: Players will join other clubs after being released or terminated from their contract. Only the following clubs are mentioned when that club signed the player in the same transfer window.

== Competitions ==
=== Overview ===
Competition	First match	Last match	Starting round	Final position	Record							
Competition	First match	Last match	Starting round	Final position	Pld	W	D	L	GF	GA	GD	Win %
Allsvenskan	1 April 2024	10 November 2024	Matchday 1	4th	30	16	5	9	45	35	+10	53.33
Svenska Cupen 2023/24	23 August 2023	1 May 2024	Round 2	Final	6	4	1	1	15	2	+13	66.67
Svenska Cupen 2024/25	10 October 2024	2 March 2025	Round 2	Group Stage	1	1	0	0	6	1	+5	100.00
UEFA Conference League 2024/25	25 July 2024	8 May 2025	2nd Qualifying Round	Semi Final	12	8	2	2	20	10	+10	66.67
Total					49	29	8	12	86	48	+38	59.18

Last updated: 8 May 2025
Source: Soccerway

=== Club Friendlies ===
20 January 2024 Friendly	(Sweden) Brommapojkarna	3–0	Djurgården (Sweden)	Stockholm
14:00 CET	Fritzson 2'; Vasić 49'; Jensen 63'	Report		Stadium: Grimsta IP; Attendance: 250; Referee: (Sweden) Victor Wolf

27 January 2024 Friendly	(Sweden) Västerås	0–0	Djurgården (Sweden)	Västerås
14:00 CET		Report		Stadium: Hitachi Energy Arena; Referee: (Sweden) Mohammed Al-Hakim

6 February 2024 Friendly	(Sweden) Mjällby	1–0	Djurgården (Sweden)	Las Palmas
17:00 CET	Bergström 47'	Report		Stadium: Ciudad deportiva de Barranco Seco

10 February 2024 Friendly	(Sweden) Djurgården	1–3	Viking FK (Norway)	Stockholm
15:00 CET	Šabović 86'	Report	Salvesen 60' 67' 90+6' (pen.)	Stadium: Tele2 Arena; Attendance: 5,106; Referee: (Sweden) Rambod Beigi

22 March 2024 Friendly	(Sweden) Örebro	0–5	Djurgården (Sweden)	Lidingö
13:00 CET		Report	Danielson 4'; Fallenius 26'; Hümmet 54'; Saeed 72'; Therkildsen 78'	Stadium: Lidingövallen; Referee: (Sweden) Tess Olofsson

28 June 2024 Friendly	(Sweden) Djurgården	2–2	Sirius (Sweden)	Enköping
18:00 CET	Leach Holm 48'; Šabović 56'	Report	Alsanati 72'; Ljungberg 90+1'	Stadium: Enavallen; Referee: (Sweden) Farouk Nehdi

22 November 2024 Friendly	(Sweden) Djurgården	0–3	Elfsborg (Sweden)	Stockholm
13:00 CEST		Report	Holten 18'; Rapp 66'; Richtnér 82'	Stadium: Kristinebergs IP; Referee: (Sweden) Farouk Nehdi

5 December 2024 Friendly	(Sweden) Djurgården	6–1	HJK Helsinki (Finland)	Stockholm
15:00 CEST	Eriksson 65' 105+5'; Haarala 67' 71'; Åslund 91'; Fallenius 98'		Erwin 50' (pen.)	Stadium: Tele2 Arena; Referee: (Sweden) Marcus Holmberg

=== Allsvenskan ===
==== League table ====
Pos	Team	Pld	W	D	L	GF	GA	GD	Pts	Qualification or relegation
2	Hammarby IF	30	16	6	8	48	25	+23	54	Qualification for the Conference League second qualifying round
3	AIK	30	17	3	10	46	41	+5	54	Qualification for the Conference League second qualifying round
4	Djurgårdens IF	30	16	5	9	45	35	+10	53	
5	Mjällby AIF	30	14	8	8	44	35	+9	50	
6	GAIS	30	14	6	10	36	34	+2	48	

Source: svenskfotboll.se (in Swedish)
Rules for classification: 1) Points; 2) Goal difference; 3) Goals scored; 4) Head-to-head points; 5) Head-to-head goal difference; 6) Head-to-head away goals scored; 7) Play-off
(Note: Play-off is only played if need to decide champion, teams for relegation or UEFA competition and will be played on a neutral ground).

==== Results summary ====
Overall								Home						Away					
Pld	W	D	L	GF	GA	GD	Pts	W	D	L	GF	GA	GD	W	D	L	GF	GA	GD
30	16	5	9	45	35	+10	53	8	3	3	20	14	+6	8	2	6	25	21	+4

Source: soccerway

==== Results by round ====
Round	1	2	3	4	5	6	7	8	9	10	11	12	13	14	15	16	17	18	19	20	21	22	23	24	25	26	27	28	29	30
Ground	A	H	H	A	H	H	A	H	A	H	A	H	A	H	A	A	H	H	A	A	H	A	A	H	A	H	A	H	A	H
Result	W	D	W	L	L	W	W	W	W	W	W	L	W	W	L	W	D	L	W	L	D	W	L	W	D	D	L	W	L	W
Position	3	5	2	4	7	4	3	2	2	2	2	2	2	2	2	2	2	2	3	2	3	2	2	2	2	3	4	4	4	4
Points	3	4	7	7	7	10	13	16	19	22	25	25	28	31	31	34	35	35	38	38	39	42	42	45	46	47	47	50	50	53

Updated to match(es) played on 10 November 2024. Source:
A = Away; H = Home; W = Win; D = Draw; L = Loss

==== Matches ====
===== April =====
1 April 2024 Match 1	Göteborg	1–4	Djurgården	Gothenburg
14:00 CEST	Þórðarson (yellow card) 17' (yellow-red card) 27'; Svensson (yellow card) 25'; Muçolli (yellow card) 25'; Abraham 84'	Report	Danielson 39' (pen.); Šabović (yellow card) 45+2'; Dahl (yellow card) 45+5'; L Bergvall 45+7'; Tenho 72'; Gulliksen 76'	Stadium: Gamla Ullevi; Attendance: 17,879; Referee: (Sweden) Glenn Nyberg

8 April 2024 Match 2	Djurgården	3–3	Häcken	Stockholm
19:10 CEST	L Bergvall (yellow card) 40'; Nguen 87' 89'; Danielson 90+4' (pen.)	Report	Rygaard (yellow card) 17'; Chilufya 23'; Lindberg 58'; Inoussa 64'; Layouni (yellow card) 71'	Stadium: Tele2 Arena; Attendance: 22,485; Referee: (Sweden) Mohammed Al-Hakim

14 April 2024 Match 3	Djurgården	2–0	Sirius	Stockholm
16:30 CEST	Leach Holm 16'; Gulliksen (yellow card) 37'; Hümmet 72'; Wikheim (yellow card) 87'	Report	Joakim Persson (yellow card) 15'; Stensson (yellow card) 83'; Sjögrell (yellow card) 86'	Stadium: Tele2 Arena; Attendance: 19,486; Referee: (Sweden) Fredrik Klitte

21 April 2024 Match 4	AIK	2–0	Djurgården	Stockholm
14:00 CEST	Celina 57'; Pittas 75'; Papagiannopoulos (yellow card) 78'	Report	Ekdal (yellow card) 51'; Šabović (yellow card) 72'; Johansson (yellow card) 82'	Stadium: Strawberry Arena; Attendance: 44,734; Referee: (Sweden) Glenn Nyberg

25 April 2024 Match 5	Djurgården	0–1	Malmö	Stockholm
19:00 CEST	Leach Holm (yellow card) 82'; Nguen (red card) 83'	Report	Rosengren (yellow card) 45+3'; Stryger Larsen (yellow card) 88'; Botheim 90+4'	Stadium: Tele2 Arena; Attendance: 23,010; Referee: (Sweden) Mohammed Al-Hakim

28 April 2024 Match 6	Djurgården	1–0	GAIS	Stockholm
16:30 CEST	Hümmet 54'; Šabović (yellow card) 90+7'	Report	Wängberg (yellow card) 52'; Henriksson (yellow card) 56'	Stadium: Tele2 Arena; Attendance: 17,579; Referee: (Sweden) Kristoffer Karlsson

===== May =====
5 May 2024 Match 7	Västerås	0–2	Djurgården	Västerås
14:00 CEST	M Larsson (yellow card) 40'; Gefvert (penalty missed) 54'	Report	Leach Holm (yellow card) 23' (goal) 31'; Danielson (yellow card) 52'; Fallenius 54'	Stadium: Hitachi Energy Arena; Attendance: 8,714; Referee: (Sweden) Fredrik Klitte

12 May 2024 Match 8	Djurgården	2–0	Elfsborg	Stockholm
16:30 CEST	Šabović 47'; Une Larsson (yellow card) 51'; Gulliksen 70'	Report		Stadium: Tele2 Arena; Attendance: 19,418; Referee: (Sweden) Victor Wolf

16 May 2024 Match 9	Brommapojkarna	0–5	Djurgården	Stockholm
19:00 CEST		Report	Gulliksen 3'; Une Larsson (yellow card) 42'; Hümmet 53' 57' 85' (pen.); Nguen 80'	Stadium: Grimsta IP; Attendance: 3,780; Referee: (Sweden) Joakim Östling

20 May 2024 Match 10	Djurgården	2–0	Halmstad	Stockholm
19:00 CEST	Wikheim 7' (yellow card) 52'; Nguen 16'	Report		Stadium: Tele2 Arena; Attendance: 16,796; Referee: (Sweden) Adam Ladebäck

25 May 2024 Match 11	Mjällby	1–3	Djurgården	Hällevik
17:30 CEST	Gustavsson (yellow card) 39'; A Johansson 48'	Report	L Bergvall 11' 23'; Hümmet 87'	Stadium: Strandvallen; Attendance: 5,005; Referee: (Sweden) Granit Maqedonci

===== June =====
2 June 2024 Match 12	Djurgården	0–3	Hammarby	Stockholm
14:00 CEST	T Bergvall (yellow card) 14'; L Bergvall (yellow card) 27'; Wikheim (yellow card) 55'	Report	Besara 15' (pen.) 28'; Vagić (yellow card) 26'; Touré 69'	Stadium: Tele2 Arena; Attendance: 27,344; Referee: (Sweden) Mohammed Al-Hakim

===== July =====
8 July 2024 Match 13	Norrköping	1–3	Djurgården	Norrköping
19:00 CEST	Prica (yellow card) 16'; Kalley (yellow card) 33'; Sigurgeirsson 63'; Lushaku (yellow card) 87'	Report	Hümmet 13'; Therkildsen (yellow card) 22'; Šabović (yellow card) 28' (goal) 68'; Gulliksen 60'; Eriksson (yellow card) 90+4'	Stadium: PlatinumCars Arena; Attendance: 12,616; Referee: (Sweden) Joakim Östling

14 July 2024 Match 14	Djurgården	1–0	Värnamo	Stockholm
14:00 CEST	Hümmet 17'; Šabović (yellow card) 42'; Ekdal (yellow card) 90+4'	Report	Junior Adjei (yellow card) 24'; Alsalkhadi (yellow card) 83'	Stadium: Tele2 Arena; Attendance: 17,788; Referee: (Sweden) Fredrik Klitte

20 July 2024 Match 15	Kalmar	2–1	Djurgården	Kalmar
15:00 CEST	Islamović 45+11' (yellow card) 84'; Ring 68'	Report	Fallenius 30'; Säfqvist (yellow card) 75'	Stadium: Guldfågeln Arena; Attendance: 9,634; Referee: (Sweden) Richard Sundell

28 July 2024 Match 16	Elfsborg	1–2	Djurgården	Borås
16:30 CEST	Zeneli 45+1'; Frick (yellow card) 57'	Report	Une Larsson (yellow card) 20'; Åslund 36'; Šabović 77' (yellow card) 77'; Fallenius (yellow card) 90+1'	Stadium: Borås Arena; Attendance: 10,157; Referee: (Sweden) Victor Wolf

===== August =====
4 August 2024 Match 17	Djurgården	1–1	Göteborg	Stockholm
14:30 CEST	Gulliksen (yellow card) 45+3'; Wikheim (yellow card) 45+3'; Ståhl 90+2'	Report	Þórðarson (yellow card) 23'; Santos 59'; Kruse (yellow card) 88'	Stadium: Tele2 Arena; Attendance: 23,418; Referee: (Sweden) Kristoffer Karlsson

18 August 2024 Match 18	Djurgården	0–2	AIK	Stockholm
14:00 CEST	Gulliksen (yellow card) 24'; Ståhl (yellow card) 66'; Bergh (yellow card) 81'; Une Larsson (yellow card) 90+6'	Report	Celina 39' (yellow card) 43'; Modesto 63'	Stadium: Tele2 Arena; Attendance: 26,225; Referee: (Sweden) Victor Wolf

25 August 2024 Match 19	Sirius	0–1	Djurgården	Uppsala
14:00 CEST		Report	Stensson (yellow card) 30'; Åslund 46'; Une Larsson (yellow card) 68'	Stadium: Studenternas IP; Attendance: 9,829; Referee: (Sweden) Granit Maqedonci

===== September =====
1 September 2024 Match 20	Malmö	4–0	Djurgården	Malmö
14:00 CEST	Bolin 9'; Christiansen 20'; Une Larsson 22' (o.g.); Busanello (yellow card) 58'; Kiese Thelin 80'; Rosengren (yellow card) 90+3'	Report	Rinne (yellow card) 32'; Schüller (yellow card) 36'	Stadium: Eleda Stadion; Attendance: 20,432; Referee: (Sweden) Fredrik Klitte

15 September 2024 Match 21	Djurgården	1–1	Mjällby	Stockholm
14:00 CEST	Radetinac (yellow card) 15'; Rinne (yellow card) 36'; Hümmet 42'; Šabović (yellow card) 79'; Gulliksen (yellow card) 90+3'	Report	Røjkjær 36' (yellow card) 36'; Jagne (yellow card) 42'; Manneh (yellow card) 76'; Stroud (yellow card) 90+3'	Stadium: Tele2 Arena; Attendance: 16,489; Referee: (Sweden) Adam Ladebäck

19 September 2024 Match 22	Häcken	1–2	Djurgården	Gothenburg
19:00 CET	Lindberg (yellow card) 29'; Leach Holm (yellow card) 63'; Youssef 89'; Gustafson (yellow card) 90+2'	Report	Šabović (yellow card) 24'; Haarala 64'; Nguen 75'	Stadium: Bravida Arena; Attendance: 4,741; Referee: (Sweden) Oscar Johnson

22 September 2024 Match 23	GAIS	3–0	Djurgården	Gothenburg
14:00 CEST	Henriksson 19'; Norén (yellow card) 42'; Lundgren 54'; Holmström 59'	Report	Kosugi (yellow card) 57'	Stadium: Gamla Ullevi; Attendance: 9,187; Referee: (Sweden) Glenn Nyberg

25 September 2024 Match 24	Djurgården	2–1	Brommapojkarna	Stockholm
19:00 CEST	Danielson (yellow card) 6'; Gulliksen 16'; Hümmet 80'; Schüller (yellow card) 90+3'; Priske (yellow card) 90+9'	Report	Jensen (yellow card) 74'; Timossi Andersson 88'	Stadium: Tele2 Arena; Attendance: 12,357; Referee: (Sweden) Adi Aganovic

29 September 2024 Match 25	Värnamo	1–1	Djurgården	Värnamo
14:00 CEST	Wenderson (yellow card) 46'; Steinwender (yellow card) 90'; Thern 90+4'	Report	Priske (yellow card) 44'; Hümmet 81'	Stadium: Finnvedsvallen; Attendance: 3,005; Referee: (Sweden) Granit Maqedonci

===== October =====
6 October 2024 Match 26	Djurgården	1–1	Kalmar	Stockholm
14:00 CEST	Kosugi 50'	Report	Osuji (yellow card) 13'; Islamović 20'; Ring (yellow card) 45+3'; Gojani (yellow card) 90+1'	Stadium: Tele2 Arena; Attendance: 15,310; Referee: (Sweden) Joakim Östling

20 October 2024 Match 27	Hammarby	2–0	Djurgården	Stockholm
14:00 CEST	Besara 12' 30'; Tekie (yellow card) 90+3'; Strand (yellow card) 90+6'	Report	Šabović (yellow card) 37'; Priske (yellow card) 53'; Radetinac (yellow card) 90+1'; Nguen (yellow card) 90+7'	Stadium: Tele2 Arena; Attendance: 27,881; Referee: (Sweden) Fredrik Klitte
Note: Match was abandoned after 75 minutes due to pyrotechnics being thrown onto the pitch, and resumed with no crowd at 2 pm on 21 October.

28 October 2024 Match 28	Djurgården	2–1	Västerås	Stockholm
19:00 CET	Nguen 30' (yellow card) 45+2'; Hümmet 48'	Report	Warneryd (yellow card) 45+1'; Jönsson (yellow card) 45+4'; Bouzaiene (yellow card) 79'	Stadium: Tele2 Arena; Attendance: 14,450; Referee: (Sweden) Victor Wolf

===== November =====
3 November 2024 Match 29	Halmstad	1–0	Djurgården	Halmstad
16:30 CET	Johansson (yellow card) 43'; Agnero 51'; Nogueira (yellow card) 72'; Granath (yellow card) 90+5'	Report	Wikheim (yellow card) 68'; Hümmet (yellow card) 81'	Stadium: Örjans Vall; Attendance: 9,007; Referee: (Sweden) Fredrik Klitte

10 November 2024 Match 30	Djurgården	3–1	Norrköping	Stockholm
15:00 CET	Šabović (yellow card) 7'; Hümmet 25' 53'; Une Larsson (yellow card) 47'; Wikheim 63'	Report	Ceesay (yellow card) 41'; Hammershøy-Mistrati 78'	Stadium: Tele2 Arena; Attendance: 17,938; Referee: (Sweden) Adam Ladebäck

=== 2023–24 Svenska Cupen ===
==== Matches ====
===== Group stage =====
Pos	Team	Pld	W	D	L	GF	GA	GD	Pts	Qualification	DIF	GOT	SKÖ	NOR
1	Djurgårdens IF	3	3	0	0	10	0	+10	9	Advance to Knockout Stage		3–0	2–0	
2	IFK Göteborg	3	2	0	1	5	6	−1	6				1–0	
3	Skövde AIK	3	1	0	2	1	3	−2	3					1–0
4	Nordic United FC	3	0	0	3	3	10	−7	0		0–5	3–4		

Updated to match(es) played on 3 March 2024. Source: Swedish Football Association
Rules for classification: 1) Points; 2) Goal difference; 3) Goals scored; 4) Head-to-head record; 5) Highest ranked team

19 February 2024 Match 1	Djurgården	2-0	Skövde AIK	Stockholm
18:30 CET	Hümmet 5'; Tenho 18' (yellow card) 74'	Report	Suljev (yellow card) 28'; Mikhail (yellow card) 48'; S Abraham (yellow card) 54'; Ovsenek (yellow card) 90'	Stadium: Tele2 Arena; Attendance: 7,559; Referee: (Sweden) Glenn Nyberg

25 February 2024 Match 2	Nordic United FC	0-5	Djurgården	Södertälje
15:15 CET	Aphrem (yellow card) 62'	Report	Schüller 4'; L Bergvall 11' 67'; Hümmet 48'; Dahl (yellow card) 57'; Leach Holm (yellow card) 58'; Säfqvist (red card) 77'; Gürsac 82' (o.g.)	Stadium: Södertälje Fotbollsarena; Attendance: 3,600; Referee: (Sweden) Adam Ladebäck

3 March 2024 Match 3	Djurgården	3-0	IFK Göteborg	Stockholm
17:30 CET	Gulliksen 76'; Hümmet 81'; Šabović 90+3'	Report	Svensson (yellow card) 7'; Yalcouyé (yellow card) 23'; Pettersson (yellow card) 44'; Carlén (yellow card) 62' (yellow-red card) 78'	Stadium: Tele2 Arena; Attendance: 16,684; Referee: (Sweden) Joakim Östling

===== Quarter-final =====
10 March 2024 Quarter-final	Djurgården	3-0	Degerfors IF	Stockholm
13:00 CET	Danielson 47'; Šabović 69'; Fallenius 84'	Report	Diaby (yellow card) 42'; Lindgren (yellow card) 43'; Mammar (yellow card) 58'; Holmén (yellow card) 77'	Stadium: Tele2 Arena; Attendance: 12,828; Referee: (Sweden) Adam Ladebäck

===== Semi-final =====
17 March 2024 Semi-final	AIK	1-1 (a.e.t.) (2–3 p)	Djurgården	Stockholm
15:00 CET	Thychosen (yellow card) 9'; Björnström (yellow card) 25'; Andersson 90+6'; Ayari (yellow card) 100'	Report	Dahl (yellow card) 9'; L Bergvall 14'; Leach Holm (yellow card) 36'; Gulliksen (yellow card) 95'	Stadium: Friends Arena; Attendance: 36,910; Referee: (Sweden) Mohammed Al-Hakim
	Penalties
	Pittas (penalty scored); Salétros (penalty missed); Celina (penalty scored); Ring (penalty missed); Ayari (penalty missed)		Danielson (penalty scored); Ekdal (penalty missed); Gulliksen (penalty scored); Hümmet (penalty scored)

===== Final =====
1 May 2024 Final	Malmö FF	1-1 (a.e.t.) (4-1 p)	Djurgården	Malmö
14:00 CET	Jansson (yellow card) 65'; Cornelius (yellow card) 67'; Ali 70'; Jørgensen (yellow card) 83'; Busanello (yellow card) 105+1'	Report	Šabović (yellow card) 9'; Gulliksen (yellow card) 49'; Hümmet 78' (yellow card) 78'; Eriksson (yellow card) 110'; Tenho (yellow card) 115'	Stadium: Eleda Stadion; Attendance: 17,264; Referee: (Sweden) Adam Ladebäck
	Penalties
	Christiansen (penalty scored); Kiese Thelin (penalty scored); Olsson (penalty scored); Berg Johnsen (penalty scored)		Danielson (penalty scored); Radetinac (penalty missed); Gulliksen (penalty missed)

=== 2024–25 Svenska Cupen ===
Djurgården were drawn away at FC Järfälla in the 2nd round of the 2024-25 Svenska Cupen on 9 July 2024.

==== Qualification ====
10 October 2024 Round 2	FC Järfälla	1–6	Djurgården	Järfälla
19:00 CET	Egziabihair 47'	Report	Gulliksen 5'; Priske 14' 63' 82' 84'; Therkildsen 25'	Stadium: Järfällavallen; Attendance: 1,406; Referee: (Sweden) Jasmin Svraka

=== 2024–25 UEFA Conference League ===
==== Qualifying ====
Djurgården entered the 2024–25 Conference League at the 2nd Qualifying Round after finishing as runners up in the 2023–24 Svenska Cupen. The draw was made on 19 June 2024, with the matches being played on 25 July 2024 and 1 August 2024. Djurgården were drawn against Progrès Niederkorn of Luxembourg, with the 1st leg at home.

The draw for the 3rd Qualifying Round was made on 22 July 2024, which drew the winners of the tie against Ilves of Finland or Austria Wien of Austria, with the first leg away from home.

The draw for the Play-off Round was made on 5 August 2024, which drew the winners of the tie against Maribor of Slovenia or Vojvodina of Serbia, with the first leg at home.

All draws were made at the UEFA headquarters in Nyon, Switzerland.

===== Matches =====
25 July 2024 2nd Qualifying Round 1st leg	Djurgården (Sweden)	3–0	(Luxembourg) Progrès Niederkorn	Stockholm
19:00 CET	Wikheim 21' (yellow card) 35'; Hümmet 27' 61'; Tenho (yellow card) 42'; Danielson (yellow card) 54'; Dahl (yellow card) 80'	Report	Natami (yellow card) 32'; Bah (yellow card) 38'; Karamoko (yellow card) 42'; Lybohy (yellow card) 63'; Duarte (yellow card) 76'; Amofa (yellow card) 90+2'	Stadium: Tele2 Arena; Attendance: 15,089; Referee: Alessandro Dudic (Switzerland)

1 August 2024 2nd Qualifying Round 2nd leg	Progrès Niederkorn (Luxembourg)	1–0	(Sweden) Djurgården	Differdange
19:00 CET	Karamoko 3' (yellow card) 10'; Jousselin (yellow card) 9'; Duarte (yellow card) 74'; Daham (yellow card) 86'	Report	Schüller (yellow card) 15'; Une Larsson (red card) 36'; Šabović (yellow card) 76'	Stadium: Stade Municipal de la Ville de Differdange; Attendance: 1,900; Referee: Goga Kikacheishvili (Georgia)

Djurgården won 3–1 on aggregate.

8 August 2024 3rd Qualifying Round 1st leg	Ilves (Finland)	1-1	(Sweden) Djurgården	Tampere
18:00 CET	Haarala (yellow card) 18'; Pikkarainen (yellow card) 47'; Riski 65'	Report	Wikheim 57'; Šabović (yellow card) 64'	Stadium: Tammelan Stadion; Attendance: 8,017; Referee: Edgars Maļcevs (Latvia)

15 August 2024 3rd Qualifying Round 2nd leg	Djurgården (Sweden)	3-1	(Finland) Ilves	Stockholm
19:00 CET	Šabović 14'; Hümmet 43'; Ståhl 52' (yellow card) 80'; Gulliksen (yellow card) 56'; Eriksson (yellow card) 85'	Report	Riski 30'; Jorginho (yellow card) 85'; Akpudje (yellow card) 90+2'	Stadium: Tele2 Arena; Attendance: 16,258; Referee: Elchin Masiyev (Azerbaijan)

Djurgården won 4–2 on aggregate.

22 August 2024 Play-off Round 1st leg	Djurgården (Sweden)	1-0	(Slovenia) Maribor	Stockholm
19:00 CET	Nguen 69'	Report	Sikošek (yellow card) 21'; Iličić (yellow card) 39'; J Repas (yellow card) 45+3'; Karič (red card) 89'	Stadium: Tele2 Arena; Attendance: 12,579; Referee: Jasper Vergoote (Belgium)

29 August 2024 Play-off Round 2nd leg	Maribor (Slovenia)	0-1	(Sweden) Djurgården	Maribor
19:15 CET	Vidmar (yellow card) 47' (yellow-red card) 59'; Repas (yellow card) 59'; Iličić (yellow card) 90'; Milec (yellow card) 90+6'	Report	Hümmet 4'; Stensson (yellow card) 90+1'; Priske (yellow card) 90+2'; Danielson (yellow card) 90+4'	Stadium: Ljudski vrt Attendance: 8,150; Referee: Manfredas Lukjančukas (Lithuania)

Djurgården won 2-0 on aggregate.

==== League phase ====
Djurgården made the league phase, and were placed in pot 2 for the draw as the 11th highest ranked team.

The league phase draw was made at the Grimaldi Forum in Monaco, on Friday 30 August, and drew Djurgården against LASK of Austria, Legia Warsaw of Poland, Vitória de Guimarães of Portugal, The New Saints of Wales, Panathinaikos of Greece and Víkingur Reykjavík of Iceland. The fixtures were announced on Saturday 31 August.

===== League table =====
Pos	Team	Pld	W	D	L	GF	GA	GD	Pts	Qualification
3	(Italian Football Federation) Fiorentina	6	4	1	1	18	7	+11	13	Advance to round of 16 (seeded)
4	(Austrian Football Association) Rapid Wien	6	4	1	1	11	5	+6	13	Advance to round of 16 (seeded)
5	(Swedish Football Association) Djurgårdens IF	6	4	1	1	11	7	+4	13 (Note: Away goals scored: Djurgårdens IF 5, Lugano 4.)	Advance to round of 16 (seeded)
6	(Swiss Football Association) Lugano	6	4	1	1	11	7	+4	13	Advance to round of 16 (seeded)
7	(Polish Football Association) Legia Warsaw	6	4	0	2	13	5	+8	12	Advance to round of 16 (seeded)

Source: UEFA
Rules for classification: League phase tiebreakers
Notes:

Round	1	2	3	4	5	6
Ground	A	H	H	A	A	H
Result	D	L	W	W	W	W
Position	16	24	16	12	11	5
Points	1	1	4	7	10	13

Updated to match(es) played on 7 November 2024. Source: UEFA
A = Away; H = Home; W = Win; D = Draw; L = Loss

===== Matches =====
3 October 2024 1	LASK (Austria)	2-2	(Sweden) Djurgården	Linz
21:00 CEST	Stojković (yellow card) 21'; Berisha 26'; Flecker 49'; Entrup (yellow card) 90+3'	Report	Priske 58'; Nguen 65' (yellow card) 75'; Gulliksen (yellow card) 90+4'	Stadium: Raiffeisen Arena; Attendance: 8,500; Referee: Bulat Sariyev (Kazakhstan)

24 October 2024 2	Djurgården (Sweden)	1-2	(Portugal) Vitória de Guimarães	Stockholm
18:45 CEST	Danielson (yellow card) 45+2'; Stensson 62'; Šabović (yellow card) 90+1'	Report	Mendes (yellow card) 13'; Borevković (yellow card) 37'; Manu 58' (yellow card) 76'; Santos 79'; Ramírez (yellow card) 81'; Samu (yellow card) 90+5'	Stadium: Tele2 Arena; Attendance: 12,666; Referee: Genc Nuza (Kosovo)

7 November 2024 3	Djurgården (Sweden)	2-1	(Greece) Panathinaikos	Stockholm
21:00 CEST	Ståhl (yellow card) 13'; Gulliksen 49'; Stensson (yellow card) 70'; Hümmet 72'; Nguen (yellow card) 80'	Report	Đuričić 17'; Ounahi (yellow card) 60'; Jedvaj (yellow card) 80'; Bakasetas (yellow card) 88'; Mladenović (yellow card) 90+6'	Stadium: Tele2 Arena; Attendance: 17,376; Referee: Igor Pajač (Croatia)

28 November 2024 4	The New Saints (Wales)	0-1	(Sweden) Djurgården	Shrewsbury
17:45 CET	Redmond (yellow card) 78'; McManus (yellow card) 90+1'	Report	Ståhl (yellow card) 39'; Gulliksen 41'; Schüller (yellow card) 73'; Une Larsson (yellow card) 85'	Stadium: The Croud Meadow; Attendance: 3,568; Referee: Philip Farrugia (Malta)

12 December 2024 5	Víkingur Reykjavík (Iceland)	1-2	(Sweden) Djurgården	Kópavogur
21:00 CET	Ingimundarson (yellow card) 34'; Þrándarson (yellow card) 57'; Sigurpálsson 72'; Hansen (yellow card) 83'	Report	Kosugi (yellow card) 27' (goal) 62'; Stensson (yellow card) 45+1'; Wikheim 65'; Tenho (yellow card) 74' (yellow-red card) 76'; Hümmet (yellow card) 83'	Stadium: Kópavogsvöllur; Attendance: 1,450; Referee: Luka Bilbija (Bosnia and Herzegovina)

19 December 2024 6	Djurgården (Sweden)	3-1	(Poland) Legia Warsaw	Stockholm
21:00 CET	Nguen 24'; Šabović (yellow card) 43'; Hümmet 45+4'; Danielson (yellow card) 45+16'; Åslund 76'; Kosugi (yellow card) 84'	Report	Gual (yellow card) 45+5'; Morishita (yellow card) 45+11'; Kapuadi (yellow card) 45+15'; Wszołek 56'; Chodyna (yellow card) 72'	Stadium: Tele2 Arena; Attendance: 23,270; Referee: David Šmajc (Slovenia)

== Statistics ==
=== Appearances ===
Last updated: 19 December 2024.

No.	Pos.	Name	Allsvenskan		Svenska Cupen 2023/24		Svenska Cupen 2024/25		UEFA Conference League 2024/25		Total	
No.	Pos.	Name	Apps	Goals	Apps	Goals	Apps	Goals	Apps	Goals	Apps	Goals
Goalkeepers
30	GK	(Sweden) Malkolm Nilsson Säfqvist	1	0	1	0	0	0	0	0	2	0
35	GK	(Sweden) Jacob Rinne	8+1	0	0	0	0	0	6	0	14+1	0
Defenders
2	DF	(Sweden) Piotr Johansson	12	0	6	0	0	0	0	0	18	0
3	DF	(Sweden) Marcus Danielson	22+1	2	6	1	1	0	11	0	40+1	3
4	DF	(Sweden) Jacob Une Larsson	16+6	0	0+1	0	1	0	8	0	25+7	0
5	DF	(Finland) Miro Tenho	24+3	1	6	1	0	0	5+1	0	35+4	2
12	DF	(Sweden) Theo Bergvall	0+2	0	0+1	0	0	0	0	0	0+3	0
17	DF	(Denmark) Peter Therkildsen	6+7	0	0+3	0	1	1	2+4	0	9+14	1
18	DF	(Finland) Adam Ståhl	12+1	1	0	0	0	0	10+1	1	22+2	2
19	DF	(Sweden) Viktor Bergh	3+4	0	0	0	1	0	1+4	0	5+8	0
27	DF	(Japan) Keita Kosugi	12+2	1	0	0	0	0	10	1	22+2	2
31	DF	(Sweden) Alieu Atlee Manneh	0	0	0+1	0	0	0	0	0	0+1	0
32	DF	(Sweden) Jack Tagesson	0	0	0	0	0+1	0	0	0	0+1	0
Midfielders
6	MF	(Finland) Rasmus Schüller	12+2	0	4	1	0	0	5+5	0	21+7	1
7	MF	(Sweden) Magnus Eriksson	2+15	0	0+4	0	1	0	2+2	0	5+21	0
8	MF	(Sweden) Albin Ekdal	5+12	0	1+4	0	0	0	0+1	0	6+17	0
9	MF	(Bosnia and Herzegovina) Haris Radetinac	4+13	0	2+4	0	1	0	0+8	0	7+25	0
13	MF	(Sweden) Daniel Stensson	5+3	0	0	0	1	0	5+2	1	11+5	1
14	MF	(Sweden) Besard Šabović	22+5	3	1+4	2	0	0	12	1	35+9	6
16	MF	(Norway) Tobias Gulliksen	22+4	5	4	1	1	1	12	2	39+4	9
22	MF	(Sweden) Patric Åslund	3+6	2	0	0	0	0	0+4	1	3+10	3
23	MF	(Norway) Gustav Wikheim	15+9	2	1	0	0	0	10+2	3	26+11	5
33	MF	(Sweden) Isak Alemayehu	0	0	0	0	0+1	0	0	0	0+1	0
Forwards
11	FW	(Turkey) Deniz Hümmet	25+5	14	6	4	0	0	11+1	6	42+6	24
15	FW	(Sweden) Oskar Fallenius	13+10	2	4+2	1	1	0	6+3	0	24+15	3
20	FW	(Norway) Tokmac Nguen	14+8	6	0	0	0	0	7+2	3	21+10	9
26	FW	(Denmark) August Priske	5+3	0	0	0	1	4	1+6	1	7+9	5
29	FW	(Finland) Santeri Haarala	8+3	1	0	0	0	0	0+5	0	8+8	1
Players transferred out during the season
10	MF	(Sweden) Samuel Leach Holm	12+4	2	6	0	0	0	1	0	19+4	2
18	FW	(Angola) Felix Vá	0	0	2	0	0	0	0	0	2	0
21	MF	(Sweden) Lucas Bergvall	11+1	3	6	3	0	0	0	0	17+1	6
22	FW	(Azerbaijan) Musa Qurbanlı	0+2	0	0+2	0	0	0	0	0	0+4	0
26	DF	(Sweden) Samuel Dahl	15	0	5+1	0	0	0	1	0	21+1	0
35	GK	(Sweden) Jacob Widell Zetterström	17	0	5	0	0	0	4	0	26	0
45	GK	(Sweden) Oscar Jansson	4+2	0	0	0	1	0	2	0	7+2	0

=== Goalscorers ===
The list is sorted by shirt number when total goals are equal.

Rnk	Pos	No.	Player	Allsvenskan	Svenska Cupen 2023/24	Svenska Cupen 2024/25	UEFA Conference League 2024/25	Total
1	FW	11	(Turkey) Deniz Hümmet	14	4	0	6	24
2	MF	16	(Norway) Tobias Gulliksen	5	1	1	2	9
2	FW	20	(Norway) Tokmac Nguen	6	0	0	3	9
4	MF	14	(Sweden) Besard Šabović	3	2	0	1	6
4	MF	21	(Sweden) Lucas Bergvall	3	3	0	0	6
6	MF	23	(Norway) Gustav Wikheim	2	0	0	3	5
6	FW	26	(Denmark) August Priske	0	0	4	1	5
8	DF	3	(Sweden) Marcus Danielson	2	1	0	0	3
8	FW	15	(Sweden) Oskar Fallenius	2	1	0	0	3
8	MF	22	(Sweden) Patric Åslund	2	0	0	1	3
11	DF	5	(Finland) Miro Tenho	1	1	0	0	2
11	MF	10	(Sweden) Samuel Leach Holm	2	0	0	0	2
11	DF	18	(Finland) Adam Ståhl	1	0	0	1	2
11	DF	27	(Japan) Keita Kosugi	1	0	0	1	2
15	MF	6	(Finland) Rasmus Schüller	0	1	0	0	1
15	MF	13	(Sweden) Daniel Stensson	0	0	0	1	1
15	DF	17	(Denmark) Peter Therkildsen	0	0	1	0	1
15	FW	29	(Finland) Santeri Haarala	1	0	0	0	1
Total				45	14	6	20	85

==== Hat-tricks ====
Key
Score	The score is at the time of the goals.		
(H)	Djurgården were the home team.	(A)	Djurgården were the away team.

Pos.	Nat.	Player	Minutes	Score	Result	Opponent	Competition	Date
FW	(Turkey)	Deniz Hümmet	53', 57', 85'	0–2, 0–3, 0–5	0–5 (A)	Brommapojkarna	Allsvenskan	16 May 2024
FW	(Denmark)	August Priske^{4}	14', 63', 82', 84'	0–2, 1–4, 1–5, 1-6	1–6 (A)	Järfälla	Svenska Cupen	10 October 2024

Notes

^{4} Player scored 4 goals

==== Own goals ====
Player	Against	Competition	Minute	Score after own goal	Result	Date
(Sweden) Jacob Une Larsson	(Sweden) Malmö FF	Allsvenskan	22'	3-0	4–0 (A)	1 September 2024

=== Disciplinary ===
Updated 19 December 2024
The list is sorted by shirt number when total cards are equal.

Rnk	Pos	No.	Name	Allsvenskan			Svenska Cupen 2023/24			Svenska Cupen 2024/25			UEFA Conference League 2024/25			Total		
Rnk	Pos	No.	Name	Yellow card	Second yellow card	Red card	Yellow card	Second yellow card	Red card	Yellow card	Second yellow card	Red card	Yellow card	Second yellow card	Red card	Yellow card	Second yellow card	Red card
1	MF	14	(Sweden) Besard Šabović	10	0	0	1	0	0	0	0	0	4	0	0	15	0	0
2	DF	4	(Sweden) Jacob Une Larsson	6	0	0	0	0	0	0	0	0	1	0	1	7	0	1
3	MF	16	(Norway) Tobias Gulliksen	4	0	0	2	0	0	0	0	0	2	0	0	8	0	0
4	DF	3	(Sweden) Marcus Danielson	2	0	0	0	0	0	0	0	0	4	0	0	6	0	0
4	FW	20	(Norway) Tokmac Nguen	2	0	1	0	0	0	0	0	0	2	0	0	4	0	1
4	MF	23	(Norway) Gustav Wikheim	5	0	0	0	0	0	0	0	0	1	0	0	6	0	0
7	DF	5	(Finland) Miro Tenho	0	0	0	2	0	0	0	0	0	1	1	0	3	1	0
8	MF	6	(Finland) Rasmus Schüller	2	0	0	0	0	0	0	0	0	2	0	0	4	0	0
8	MF	10	(Sweden) Samuel Leach Holm	2	0	0	2	0	0	0	0	0	0	0	0	4	0	0
8	MF	13	(Sweden) Daniel Stensson	1	0	0	0	0	0	0	0	0	3	0	0	4	0	0
8	DF	18	(Finland) Adam Ståhl	1	0	0	0	0	0	0	0	0	3	0	0	4	0	0
8	DF	26	(Sweden) Samuel Dahl	1	0	0	2	0	0	0	0	0	1	0	0	4	0	0
8	FW	26	(Denmark) August Priske	3	0	0	0	0	0	0	0	0	1	0	0	4	0	0
14	MF	7	(Sweden) Magnus Eriksson	1	0	0	1	0	0	0	0	0	1	0	0	3	0	0
14	FW	11	(Turkey) Deniz Hümmet	1	0	0	1	0	0	0	0	0	1	0	0	3	0	0
14	DF	27	(Japan) Keita Kosugi	1	0	0	0	0	0	0	0	0	2	0	0	3	0	0
14	GK	30	(Sweden) Malkolm Nilsson Säfqvist	1	0	0	0	0	1	0	0	0	0	0	0	1	0	1
18	MF	8	(Sweden) Albin Ekdal	2	0	0	0	0	0	0	0	0	0	0	0	2	0	0
18	MF	9	(Bosnia and Herzegovina) Haris Radetinac	2	0	0	0	0	0	0	0	0	0	0	0	2	0	0
18	MF	21	(Sweden) Lucas Bergvall	2	0	0	0	0	0	0	0	0	0	0	0	2	0	0
18	GK	35	(Sweden) Jacob Rinne	2	0	0	0	0	0	0	0	0	0	0	0	2	0	0
22	DF	2	(Sweden) Piotr Johansson	1	0	0	0	0	0	0	0	0	0	0	0	1	0	0
22	DF	12	(Sweden) Theo Bergvall	1	0	0	0	0	0	0	0	0	0	0	0	1	0	0
22	FW	15	(Sweden) Oskar Fallenius	1	0	0	0	0	0	0	0	0	0	0	0	1	0	0
22	DF	17	(Denmark) Peter Therkildsen	1	0	0	0	0	0	0	0	0	0	0	0	1	0	0
22	DF	19	(Sweden) Viktor Bergh	1	0	0	0	0	0	0	0	0	0	0	0	1	0	0
Total				55	0	1	11	0	1	0	0	0	29	1	1	95	1	3

=== Clean sheets ===
The list is sorted by shirt number when total clean sheets are equal.

Rnk	No.	Player	Allsvenskan	Svenska Cupen 2023/24	Svenska Cupen 2024/25	UEFA Conference League 2024/25	Total
1	35	(Sweden) Jacob Widell Zetterström	7	3	0	1	11
2	35	(Sweden) Jacob Rinne	1	0	0	3	4
3	9	(Bosnia and Herzegovina) Haris Radetinac	0	1	0	0	1
3	30	(Sweden) Malkolm Nilsson Säfqvist	0	1	0	0	1
Total			8	5	0	4	17
