= Samuel Dahl =

Swedish footballer

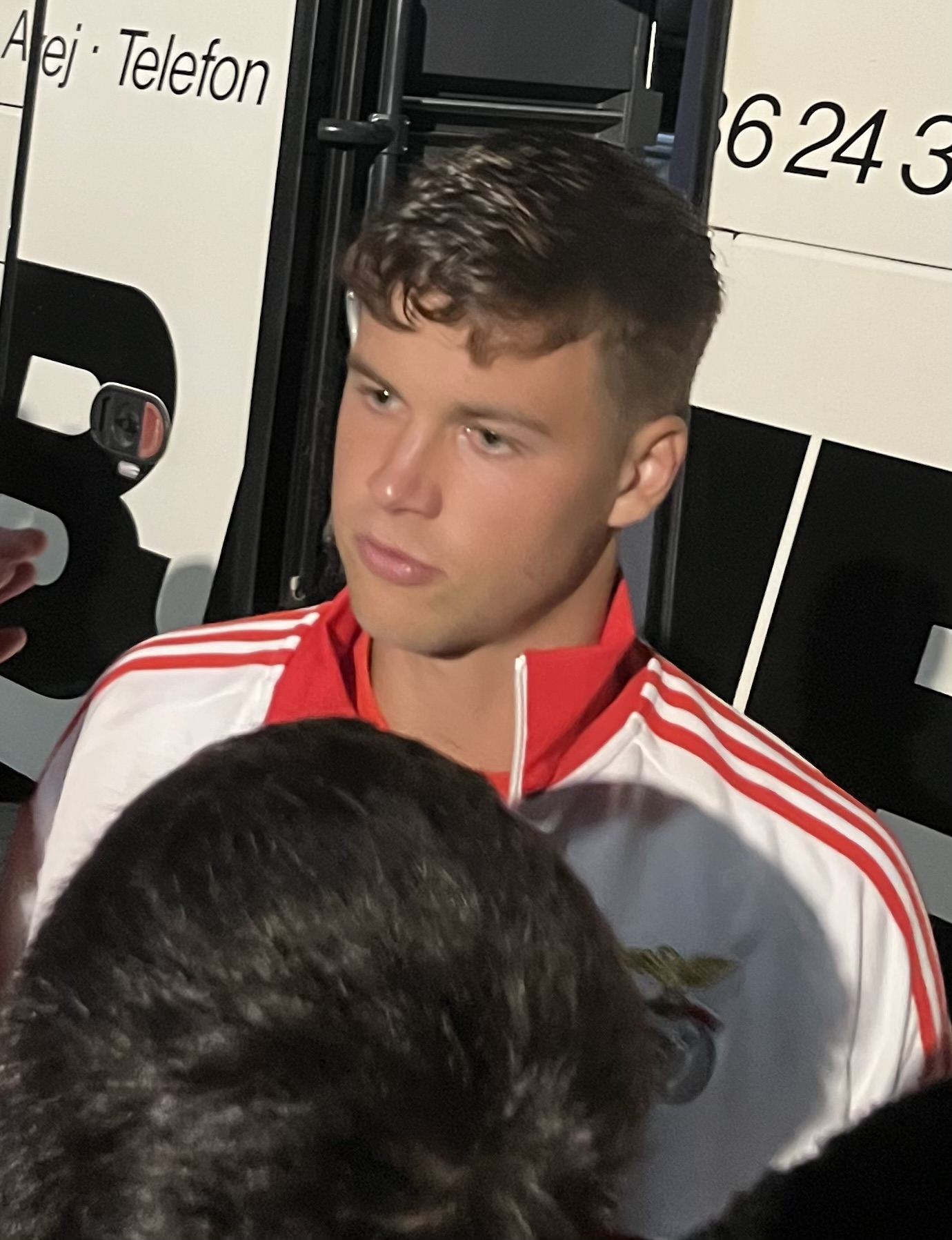
- Dahl with Benfica in 2026

Personal information
- Full name: Samuel Elias Dahl
- Date of birth: 4 March 2003 (age 23)
- Place of birth: Västerås, Sweden
- Height: 1.71 m (5 ft 7 in)
- Positions: Left-back; left winger

Team information
- Current team: Benfica
- Number: 26

Youth career
- IFK Västerås
- Västerås IK
- –2019: Västerås SK
- 2020–2021: AIK

Senior career*
| Years | Team | Apps | (Gls) |
| 2019 | Västerås SK | 1 | (0) |
| 2019 | → Västerås IK (loan) | 1 | (0) |
| 2022–2023 | Örebro SK | 42 | (0) |
| 2023–2024 | Djurgårdens IF | 28 | (0) |
| 2024–2025 | Roma | 2 | (0) |
| 2025 | → Benfica (loan) | 11 | (0) |
| 2025– | Benfica | 44 | (2) |

International career^{‡}
| 2018–2020 | Sweden U17 | 17 | (0) |
| 2021–2023 | Sweden U19 | 9 | (1) |
| 2022–2024 | Sweden U21 | 9 | (0) |
| 2024– | Sweden | 3 | (0) |
- * Club domestic league appearances and goals as of 20:24, 8 November 2026 (UTC) ‡ National team caps and goals as of 18:30, 6 October 2026 (UTC)

Samuel Elias Dahl (born 4 March 2003) is a Swedish professional footballer who plays as a left-back or left winger for Primeira Liga club Benfica and the Sweden national team.

== Club career ==
=== Early career ===
Dahl started his career at Västerås SK, before joining AIK in January 2020. In February 2022, he signed a three-year contract with Örebro SK.

=== Djurgårdens IF ===
Dahl joined Djurgårdens IF on 24 July 2023 on a reported 3 million kronor transfer from Örebro SK, and signing a 4.5-year contract that stretched through the 2027 season.

Dahl was initially not considered a clear starter, but rather a backup at the left back position for the more experienced Rami Kaib who had also joined from SC Heerenveen in the summer window. However, with Kaib struggling in his first appearances, Dahl was given the chance and immediately made an impact, laying claim on the starting spot and cementing his position in the starting 11. His high quality play was particularly impressive given his young age and lack of top-flight experience. His consistency during the remainder of the 2023 Allsvenskan season and his continued high form entering the 2024 season earned him a call up to the Sweden national team and he garnered significant interest on the international market. His play in 2024, blending excellent defensive work with great offensive vision and forming a dangerous partnership with Tobias Gulliksen on Djurgårdens IF's left flank, earned him high praise from the Djurgårdens IF fan base and he was frequently considered the best player on the pitch.

=== Roma ===
After much speculation during the 2024 summer transfer window, it was announced that Dahl had signed for Serie A club Roma on 28 July 2024, almost exactly one year after joining Djurgården, for a reported €4.3 million fee.

=== Benfica ===
On 3 February 2025, Dahl joined Primeira Liga club Benfica on loan until the end of the 2024–25 season. On 12 June 2025, Roma confirmed the permanent transfer to Benfica.

== International career ==
Dahl made his full international debut for the Sweden national team on 12 January 2024, playing for the full 90 minutes in a friendly 2–1 win against Estonia.

== Career statistics ==
=== Club ===
As of match played 8 November 2026

Appearances and goals by club, season and competition
| Club | Season | League | | | National cup (Note: Includes Svenska Cupen, Coppa Italia, Taça de Portugal) | | League cup (Note: Includes Taça da Liga) | | Europe | | Other | | Total | |
| Club | Season | Division | Apps | Goals | Apps | Goals | Apps | Goals | Apps | Goals | Apps | Goals | Apps | Goals |
|---|---|---|---|---|---|---|---|---|---|---|---|---|---|---|
| Västerås SK | 2019 | Superettan | 1 | 0 | 0 | 0 | — | | — | | — | | 1 | 0 |
| Västerås IK (loan) | 2019 | Division 3 | 1 | 0 | 0 | 0 | — | | — | | — | | 1 | 0 |
| Örebro SK | 2022 | Superettan | 27 | 0 | 2 | 0 | — | | — | | — | | 29 | 0 |
| Örebro SK | 2023 | Superettan | 15 | 0 | 3 | 0 | — | | — | | — | | 18 | 0 |
| Örebro SK | Total | | 42 | 0 | 5 | 0 | — | | — | | — | | 47 | 0 |
| Djurgårdens IF | 2023 | Allsvenskan | 13 | 0 | 0 | 0 | — | | 2 (Note: Appearances in UEFA Europa Conference League) | 0 | — | | 15 | 0 |
| Djurgårdens IF | 2024 | Allsvenskan | 15 | 0 | 6 | 0 | — | | 1 (Note: Appearance in UEFA Conference League) | 0 | — | | 22 | 0 |
| Djurgårdens IF | Total | | 28 | 0 | 6 | 0 | — | | 3 | 0 | — | | 37 | 0 |
| Roma | 2024–25 | Serie A | 2 | 0 | 1 | 0 | — | | 0 | 0 | — | | 3 | 0 |
| Benfica (loan) | 2024–25 | Primeira Liga | 11 | 0 | 4 | 0 | — | | 3 (Note: Appearances in UEFA Champions League) | 0 | 4 (Note: Appearances in FIFA Club World Cup) | 0 | 22 | 0 |
| Benfica | 2025–26 | Primeira Liga | 33 | 1 | 4 | 0 | 2 | 0 | 13 | 1 | 1 (Note: Appearance in Supertaça Cândido de Oliveira) | 0 | 53 | 2 |
| Benfica | 2026–27 | Primeira Liga | 11 | 1 | 0 | 0 | 1 | 0 | 7 (Note: Appearances in UEFA Europa League) | 0 | — | | 19 | 1 |
| Benfica | Benfica total | | 55 | 2 | 8 | 0 | 3 | 0 | 23 | 1 | 5 | 0 | 94 | 3 |
| Career total | | | 129 | 2 | 20 | 0 | 3 | 0 | 26 | 1 | 5 | 0 | 183 | 3 |

=== International ===
As of match played 5 October 2026

Appearances and goals by national team and year
| National team | Year | Apps | Goals |
|---|---|---|---|
| Sweden | 2024 | 1 | 0 |
| Sweden | 2025 | 1 | 0 |
| Sweden | 2026 | 1 | 0 |
| Total | | 3 | 0 |

== Honours ==
Benfica

- Supertaça Cândido de Oliveira: 2025
