= 2022 Superettan =

Superettan
- Season: 2022
- Champions: IF Brommapojkarna
- Promoted: IF Brommapojkarna; Halmstads BK
- Relegated: Norrby IF; Dalkurd FF
- Matches played: 240
- Goals scored: 697 (2.9 per match)
- Top goalscorer: Viktor Granath (24)
- Biggest home win: Brommapojkarna 5–0 Dalkurd (9 July 2022)
- Biggest away win: J-Södra 0–5 Halmstad (13 August 2022)
- Highest scoring: Västerås 4–4 Trelleborg (16 August 2022)
- Longest winning run: Brommapojkarna (8 matches)
- Longest unbeaten run: Brommapojkarna (12 matches)
- Longest winless run: Östersund (13 matches)
- Longest losing run: Dalkurd (6 matches)
- Highest attendance: 5,725; Öster 4–1 Brommapojkarna (4 October 2022)
- Lowest attendance: 87; Utsikten 0–2 Västerås (2 October 2022)

The 2022 Superettan was part of the 2022 Swedish football season, and the 23rd season of Superettan, Sweden's second-tier football division in its current format. A total of 16 teams contested the league.

== Teams ==
A total of 16 teams contest the league. The top three teams qualify directly for promotion to Allsvenskan, the fourth will enter a play-off for the chance of promotion. The three bottom teams are automatically relegated, while the 13th place team will compete in a play-off to determine whether they are relegated.

=== New teams ===
- Promoted from the 2021 Ettan
  - IF Brommapojkarna – Winner Ettan Norra
  - Utsiktens BK – Winner Ettan Södra
  - Dalkurd FF – Runner-up Ettan Norra — Promoted by winning play-off over GAIS
  - Skövde AIK – Runner-up Ettan Södra — Promoted by winning play-off over Akropolis IF
- Relegated from the 2021 Allsvenskan
  - Östersunds FK
  - Örebro SK
  - Halmstads BK — Relegated by losing play-off to Helsingborgs IF

=== Stadiums and locations ===
Locations of the 2022 Superettan teams

Team	Location	Stadium	Stadium capacity (Note: According to each club information page at the Swedish Football Association website for Allsvenskan.)
AFC Eskilstuna	Eskilstuna	Tunavallen	7,800
IF Brommapojkarna	Stockholm	Grimsta IP	5,000
IK Brage	Borlänge	Domnarvsvallen	6,500
Dalkurd FF	Uppsala	Nya Studenternas	10,000
Halmstads BK	Halmstad	Örjans Vall	10,873
Jönköpings Södra IF	Jönköping	Stadsparksvallen	5,500
Landskrona BoIS	Landskrona	Landskrona IP	10,500
Norrby IF	Borås	Borås Arena	17,800
Skövde AIK	Skövde	Södermalms IP	4,500
Trelleborgs FF	Trelleborg	Vångavallen	7,000
Utsiktens BK	Bravida Arena	Ruddalens IP	6,500
Västerås SK	Västerås	Iver Arena	7,000
Örebro SK	Örebro	Behrn Arena	14,400
Örgryte IS	Gothenburg	Gamla Ullevi	18,416
Östers IF	Växjö	Visma Arena	12,000
Östersunds FK	Östersund	Jämtkraft Arena	8,545

== League table ==
Pos	Team	Pld	W	D	L	GF	GA	GD	Pts	Promotion, qualification or relegation
1	IF Brommapojkarna (C, P)	30	19	5	6	64	40	+24	62	Promotion to Allsvenskan
2	Halmstads BK (P)	30	17	5	8	57	32	+25	56	Promotion to Allsvenskan
3	Östers IF (Q)	30	13	9	8	47	35	+12	48	Qualification to promotion play-offs
4	Trelleborgs FF	30	13	6	11	46	49	−3	45	
5	Skövde AIK	30	11	11	8	40	39	+1	44	
6	Landskrona BoIS	30	11	11	8	40	42	−2	44	
7	IK Brage	30	11	9	10	44	40	+4	42	
8	AFC Eskilstuna	30	12	4	14	48	46	+2	40	
9	Västerås SK	30	10	10	10	50	49	+1	40	
10	Örebro SK	30	10	7	13	33	38	−5	37	
11	Utsiktens BK	30	10	7	13	40	46	−6	37	
12	Jönköpings Södra IF	30	9	9	12	41	51	−10	36	
13	Örgryte IS (O)	30	8	11	11	45	44	+1	35	Qualification to relegation play-offs
14	Östersunds FK (O)	30	7	10	13	32	44	−12	31	Qualification to relegation play-offs
15	Norrby IF (R)	30	8	7	15	33	47	−14	31	Relegation to Ettan
16	Dalkurd FF (R)	30	8	5	17	37	55	−18	29	Relegation to Ettan

Source: svenskfotboll.se (in Swedish)
Rules for classification: 1) Points; 2) Goal difference; 3) Number of goals scored; 4) Head-to-head points; 5) Head-to-head goal difference; 6) Head-to-head away goals scored
(C) Champions; (O) Play-off winners; (P) Promoted; (Q) Qualified for the phase indicated; (R) Relegated

=== Relegation play-offs ===
The 13th-placed and 14th-placed teams of Superettan met the two runners-up from 2022 Ettan (Norra and Södra) in two-legged ties on a home-and-away basis with the teams from Superettan finishing at home.

10 November 2022
19:00

Sandvikens IF	0–2	Örgryte IS
	Report	Brorsson 36'; Lundberg 60'

Jernvallen, Sandviken
Attendance: 2,075
Referee: Adam Ladebäck
13 November 2022
16:00

Örgryte IS	2–3	Sandvikens IF
Lundberg 23'; Ahl Holmström 71'	Report	Igbarumah 47', 50'; Al-Saed 66'

Gamla Ullevi, Gothenburg
Attendance: 3,857
Referee: Joakim Östling

Örgryte IS won 4–3 on aggregate.

10 November 2022
19:00

Falkenbergs FF	1–1	Östersunds FK
Aguda 40'	Report	Brendon 5'

Falcon Alkoholfri Arena, Falkenberg
Attendance: 3,177
Referee: Oscar Johnson
13 November 2022
13:00

Östersunds FK	2–0	Falkenbergs FF
Kroon 57'; Fritzson 69'	Report

Jämtkraft Arena, Östersund
Attendance: 4,257
Referee: Victor Wolf

Östersunds FK won 3–1 on aggregate.

=== Positions by round ===
Team ╲ Round	1	2	3	4	5	6	7	8	9	10	11	12	13	14	15	16	17	18	19	20	21	22	23	24	25	26	27	28	29	30
IF Brommapojkarna	5	7	8	11	8	7	8	4	8	7	6	8	7	6	3	4	3	3	2	2	2	2	2	2	2	2	1	1	1	1
Halmstads BK	8	12	9	4	5	4	2	1	1	1	1	1	1	1	1	1	1	1	1	1	1	1	1	1	1	1	2	2	2	2
Östers IF	2	5	5	5	4	3	4	8	5	3	4	7	8	7	5	6	4	4	4	4	4	4	4	4	3	3	3	3	3	3
Trelleborgs FF	7	10	10	6	7	9	9	5	9	9	7	5	6	8	6	3	6	6	6	5	6	7	5	5	5	6	6	6	6	4
Skövde AIK	4	2	2	2	1	5	5	6	3	5	8	6	4	4	7	7	5	5	5	6	5	5	6	6	6	5	5	4	4	5
Landskrona BoIS	15	16	16	14	13	10	10	11	11	10	10	9	9	10	10	10	10	10	10	11	10	9	9	8	7	8	7	7	7	6
IK Brage	1	1	3	3	3	2	1	2	2	2	2	2	2	2	2	2	2	2	3	3	3	3	3	3	4	4	4	5	5	7
AFC Eskilstuna	3	3	1	1	2	1	3	3	7	4	5	4	5	3	4	5	7	7	7	7	7	6	7	7	9	7	8	8	8	8
Västerås SK	12	14	15	15	12	13	15	14	12	12	12	12	12	12	12	11	11	13	13	12	13	14	13	13	12	11	13	12	9	9
Örebro SK	16	9	6	8	10	8	7	9	6	8	9	10	10	9	9	9	9	9	9	9	8	10	10	9	8	9	10	10	11	10
Utsiktens BK	14	8	4	7	6	6	6	7	4	6	3	3	3	5	8	8	8	8	8	8	9	8	8	10	11	10	9	9	10	11
Jönköpings Södra IF	10	15	12	13	14	14	12	12	13	14	14	15	13	13	14	15	14	11	14	13	14	12	11	11	10	12	11	11	13	12
Örgryte IS	9	11	14	16	16	16	16	16	16	16	16	14	15	15	15	14	15	15	11	10	11	11	14	14	14	13	12	13	12	13
Östersunds FK	11	13	13	10	11	12	14	15	15	15	15	16	16	16	16	16	16	16	16	16	16	16	15	15	15	16	16	15	15	14
Norrby IF	6	4	7	9	9	11	11	10	10	11	11	11	11	11	11	12	12	12	12	14	12	13	12	12	13	14	14	14	14	15
Dalkurd FF	13	6	11	12	15	15	13	13	14	13	13	13	14	14	13	13	13	14	15	15	15	15	16	16	16	15	15	16	16	16

Promotion to Allsvenskan
Promotion play-offs
Relegation play-offs
Relegation to Ettan

Source: everysport.com

== Results by round ==
Team ╲ Round	1	2	3	4	5	6	7	8	9	10	11	12	13	14	15	16	17	18	19	20	21	22	23	24	25	26	27	28	29	30
AFC Eskilstuna	W	W	W	W	L	W	L	L	L	W	L	W	D	W	L	D	D	L	L	W	L	W	L	L	L	W	L	D	W	L
IK Brage	W	W	L	W	D	W	W	D	D	W	L	W	D	D	L	W	W	D	D	L	W	L	W	L	L	D	D	L	L	L
IF Brommapojkarna	W	L	D	L	W	W	D	W	L	W	D	L	W	D	W	D	W	W	W	W	W	W	W	W	L	L	W	W	W	W
Dalkurd FF	L	W	L	L	L	L	W	D	L	D	W	L	L	L	W	D	W	L	L	L	L	L	L	W	L	W	D	L	W	D
Halmstads BK	D	L	W	W	W	W	W	W	W	D	L	W	L	W	W	W	W	W	W	D	L	W	L	W	D	L	L	D	L	W
Jönköpings Södra IF	L	L	W	L	L	L	W	D	L	L	D	L	W	D	L	D	W	W	L	D	D	W	W	L	W	D	D	W	L	D
Landskrona BoIS	L	L	L	W	D	W	D	D	D	D	W	W	W	L	D	L	L	L	D	D	W	W	L	W	W	D	W	D	D	W
Norrby IF	W	W	L	L	D	L	D	W	L	L	W	L	W	D	L	L	L	D	D	L	W	D	W	L	D	L	L	L	W	L
Skövde AIK	W	W	D	W	W	L	L	D	W	D	L	W	W	D	L	D	W	D	L	W	D	L	L	W	D	W	D	D	L	D
Trelleborgs FF	W	L	D	W	D	L	W	W	L	D	W	W	D	L	W	W	L	D	D	W	L	L	W	W	L	L	W	L	L	W
Utsiktens BK	L	W	W	L	W	W	L	D	W	D	W	W	D	L	L	L	L	D	D	L	L	W	L	L	L	W	W	D	D	L
Västerås SK	L	D	L	D	W	L	L	D	W	D	W	L	L	W	D	D	L	L	D	D	D	D	W	L	W	W	L	W	W	W
Örebro SK	L	W	W	L	L	W	W	D	W	L	L	L	D	W	W	L	L	L	D	L	W	D	L	W	W	L	L	D	D	D
Örgryte IS	D	L	L	L	L	L	D	L	D	D	D	W	L	D	D	W	D	W	W	W	D	L	L	L	W	W	D	D	W	L
Östers IF	W	L	W	D	W	W	L	L	W	W	D	L	D	D	W	D	W	D	D	W	W	L	W	L	W	D	W	D	L	L
Östersunds FK	L	D	D	W	L	L	L	L	D	L	L	L	L	D	D	D	L	W	W	L	L	D	W	W	D	L	D	W	D	W

Source: soccerstats.com
W = Win; D = Draw; L = Lose

== Results ==
Home \ Away	ESK	BRA	BRO	DAL	HAL	JÖN	LAN	NOR	SKÖ	TRE	UTS	VÄS	ÖRE	ÖRG	ÖST	ÖFK
AFC Eskilstuna		2–3	3–1	0–0	2–0	0–2	2–0	1–2	1–2	1–0	3–1	5–2	0–1	4–3	1–2	4–1
IK Brage	1–1		3–1	0–0	1–2	1–2	1–1	2–1	0–0	1–2	1–2	0–2	3–0	4–0	0–3	1–0
IF Brommapojkarna	1–0	3–2		5–0	2–1	2–1	3–0	5–2	2–2	4–2	0–1	2–1	2–1	3–1	1–1	4–1
Dalkurd FF	3–2	1–2	0–2		0–1	5–2	0–1	2–1	3–1	2–0	4–1	1–2	0–2	1–2	0–3	1–1
Halmstads BK	2–1	1–0	2–0	3–1		3–0	2–1	1–2	3–2	1–2	4–1	1–1	0–0	2–3	2–0	2–0
Jönköpings Södra IF	2–3	1–1	1–2	0–1	0–5		2–4	2–1	0–1	2–3	5–2	2–1	1–1	2–2	2–1	1–0
Landskrona BoIS	1–1	1–1	3–3	3–1	2–1	1–1		3–2	0–1	2–1	2–0	1–0	2–1	3–2	1–3	1–1
Norrby IF	2–1	2–2	0–3	1–0	3–0	1–1	0–0		0–0	2–3	0–2	1–0	0–2	1–1	2–0	2–0
Skövde AIK	4–0	1–1	1–1	2–2	1–3	1–1	2–0	2–0		3–1	1–1	0–2	0–0	2–1	0–0	1–3
Trelleborgs FF	0–1	2–2	1–2	4–2	0–4	1–3	1–1	2–1	2–1		1–0	3–0	2–1	2–1	1–2	1–1
Utsiktens BK	2–3	1–0	3–2	3–0	2–1	0–1	2–2	1–1	1–1	0–0		0–2	1–2	0–1	1–1	3–3
Västerås SK	2–0	1–3	0–1	4–1	2–2	2–2	3–0	3–2	4–1	4–4	0–3		2–1	1–1	2–2	1–1
Örebro SK	1–0	1–3	0–2	1–3	0–2	3–1	2–2	0–0	0–1	2–2	2–0	5–2		0–1	2–1	1–0
Örgryte IS	2–2	4–0	1–1	3–3	2–2	0–0	0–1	5–1	3–0	1–2	0–2	1–1	2–0		0–1	0–1
Östers IF	3–2	1–2	4–1	2–0	1–4	2–0	0–0	2–0	2–3	0–1	3–1	1–1	1–1	2–2		2–1
Östersunds FK	0–2	1–3	2–3	1–0	0–0	1–1	3–1	1–0	2–3	2–0	0–3	2–2	2–0	0–0	1–1	

Source: svenskfotboll.se (in Swedish)
Legend: Blue = home team win; Yellow = draw; Red = away team win.

== Season statistics ==
=== Top scorers ===
As of 5 November 2022

Rank	Player	Club	Goals
1	(Sweden) Viktor Granath	Västerås SK	24
2	(Sweden) Alexander Johansson	Halmstads BK	16
3	(Sweden) Oscar Pettersson	IF Brommapojkarna	15
4	(Sweden) Jack Cooper Love	Skövde AIK	14
5	(Sweden) Amar Muhsin	AFC Eskilstuna	12
6	(Sweden) Adam Bergmark Wiberg	Östers IF	11
6	(Denmark) Nicolas Mortensen	Trelleborgs FF	11
6	(Sweden) Nikola Vasic	IF Brommapojkarna	11

=== Top assists ===
As of 5 November 2022

Rank	Player	Club	Assists
1	(Sweden) Oscar Pettersson	IF Brommapojkarna	12
2	(Sweden) Samuel Leach Holm	IF Brommapojkarna	11
3	(Montenegro) Vladimir Rodić	Östers IF	10
4	(Sweden) Simon Gefvert	Västerås SK	9
5	(Eritrea) Mohammed Saeid	Trelleborgs FF	8
6	(Iraq) André Alsanati	AFC Eskilstuna	7
6	(Sweden) Daniel Ask	Västerås SK	7
6	(Sweden) Simon Johansson	Västerås SK	7
6	(Ghana) Sadat Karim	Halmstads BK	7

=== Hat-tricks ===
Player	For	Against	Result	Date
(Sweden) Linus Olsson^{4}	Landskrona	Jönköping	2–4 (A)	10 May 2022
(Sweden) Jack Cooper Love	Skövde	Öster	2–3 (A)	2 July 2022
(Sweden) Nikola Vasic	Brommapojkarna	Norrby	5–2 (H)	24 July 2022
(Sweden) Alexander Johansson	Halmstad	Jönköping	0–5 (A)	13 August 2022
(Sweden) Viktor Granath	Västerås	Trelleborg	4–4 (H)	16 August 2022
(Sweden) Viktor Granath	Västerås	Skövde	4–1 (H)	10 September 2022
(Sweden) Edin Hamidović	Jönköping	Trelleborg	1–3 (A)	3 October 2022
(Sweden) Jesper Westermark	Öster	Brommapojkarna	4–1 (H)	4 October 2022
(Sweden) Pashang Abdulla^{4}	Dalkurd	Jönköping	5–2 (H)	30 October 2022

Notes

^{4} Player scored 4 goals
(H) – Home team
(A) – Away team

=== Discipline ===
==== Player ====
Most yellow cards: 12

- Karl Bohm (Utsikten)

Most red cards: 1

- Daniel Ask (Västerås SK)
- Niclas Bergmark (Örebro)
- Jesper Brandt (Utsikten)
- Abdelkarim Mammar Chaouche (Eskilstuna)
- Sebastian Crona (Jönköping)
- Fabio Dixon (Dalkurd)
- Erik Hedenquist (Landskrona)
- Koen Kostons (Dalkurd)
- Vladislav Kreida (Skövde)
- Jake Larsson (Örebro)
- Sigitas Olberkis (Dalkurd)
- Ivo Pękalski (Norrby)
- Nsima Peter (Utsikten)
- Jonathan Quintero (Utsikten)
- York Rafael (Eskilstuna)
- Pontus Rödin (Brage)

==== Club ====
- Most yellow cards: 36
  - Östersund
- Most red cards: 3
  - Dalkurd
  - Utsikten
