= Jimmy Thelin =

Swedish football coach (born 1978)

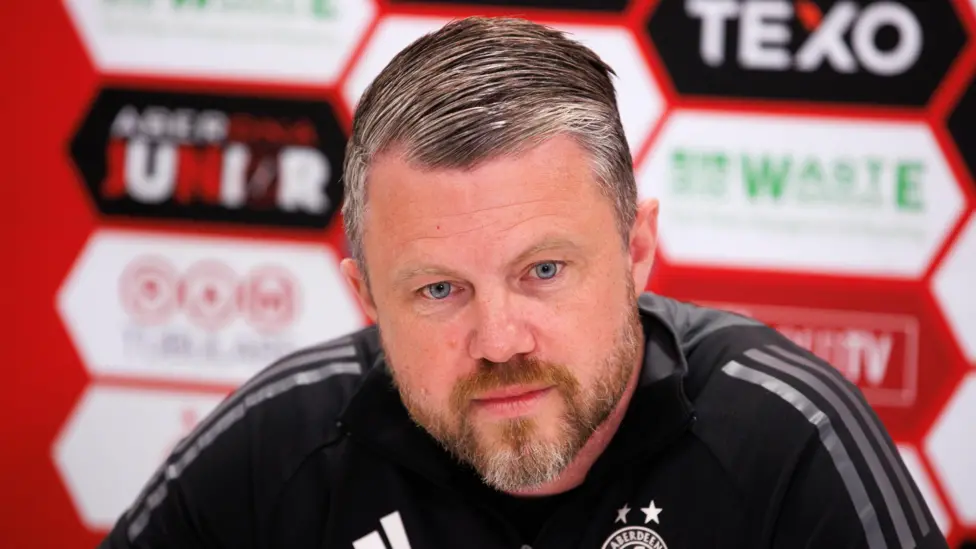
- Thelin as manager of Aberdeen

Personal information
- Full name: Bo Jimmy Thelin
- Date of birth: 14 March 1978 (age 48)
- Place of birth: Jönköping, Sweden
- Position: Centre-back

Youth career
- IF Hagapojkarna

Senior career*
Years	Team	Apps	(Gls)
1995–2003	IF Hagapojkarna	315	(81)

Managerial career
- 2005–2007: FC Ljungarum
- 2014–2017: Jönköpings Södra IF
- 2018–2024: Elfsborg
- 2024–2026: Aberdeen
- * Club domestic league appearances and goals

Bo Jimmy Thelin (born 14 March 1978) is a Swedish football coach and former player who was most recently the manager of Aberdeen.

He is the older brother of Tommy Thelin, former forward and captain of Jönköpings Södra IF.

== Playing career ==
Thelin played until 2003 as a centre-back for IF Hagapojkarna (now renamed IF Haga), one of the local minor teams of the city of Jönköping, in the fourth and in the fifth level in the league system of Swedish football.

== Managerial career ==
Thelin began his coaching career taking over as FC Ljungarum coach in 2005. This newly founded team had its first effective season in 2006, dominating the Division 6 championship with 17 wins out of 18 games total.

Thelin remained at Ljungarum until 2008, winning another championship. In 2009, he started managing the Jönköpings Södra IF Under-17 team, before coaching the Under-19 and the Under-21 teams of the same club.

At the beginning of the 2014 season, the previous J-Södra coach Mats Gren moved to the role of sporting director for IFK Göteborg, so the team found itself without a manager when 2014 Superettan had already started. The board decided to promote Jimmy Thelin as head coach of the first team, finishing the season in fourth place (the club's best finish since 1976). In the following season, he achieved an even better result, leading J-Södra back to the Allsvenskan, after 46 years.

It was announced on 16 April 2024 that Thelin had been appointed as the new manager of Scottish club Aberdeen on a three-year deal starting in June 2024. He made a total of six signings for the club in the summer transfer window. Thelin's start to his Aberdeen tenure began positively with Aberdeen winning 10 out of 11 games in the league but then Aberdeen would only go on to win 5 out of the remaining 27 games of the season, finishing 5th in the 2024–25 season. Thelin was awarded August's Scottish Premiership’s Manager of the Month. Thelin also guided Aberdeen to the 2024–25 Scottish Cup beating Celtic in the final. It was the club’s first major honour in 11 years and their first Scottish Cup triumph since the 1989–90 season.

On 4 January 2026, following a run of disappointing results and performances, Thelin was sacked by Aberdeen.

== Managerial record ==
As of match played 4 January 2026

Managerial record by team and tenure
Team	From	To	Record					Ref.
Team	From	To	G	W	D	L	Win %	Ref.
Jönköpings Södra IF	22 April 2014	31 December 2017	130	55	35	40	42.3	
IF Elfsborg	1 January 2018	1 June 2024	223	104	55	64	46.6	
Aberdeen	3 June 2024	4 January 2026	80	33	16	31	41.3	
Total			433	192	106	135	44.3	

== Honours ==
=== Manager ===
Jönköpings Södra IF

- Superettan: 2015

Elfsborg

- Allsvenskan runner-up: 2023

Aberdeen

- Scottish Cup: 2024–25

Individual

- Allsvenskan Coach of the Year: 2023
- Scottish Premiership Manager of the Month: August 2024; October 2024; April 2025
