= Jacob Rinne =

Swedish footballer (born 1993)

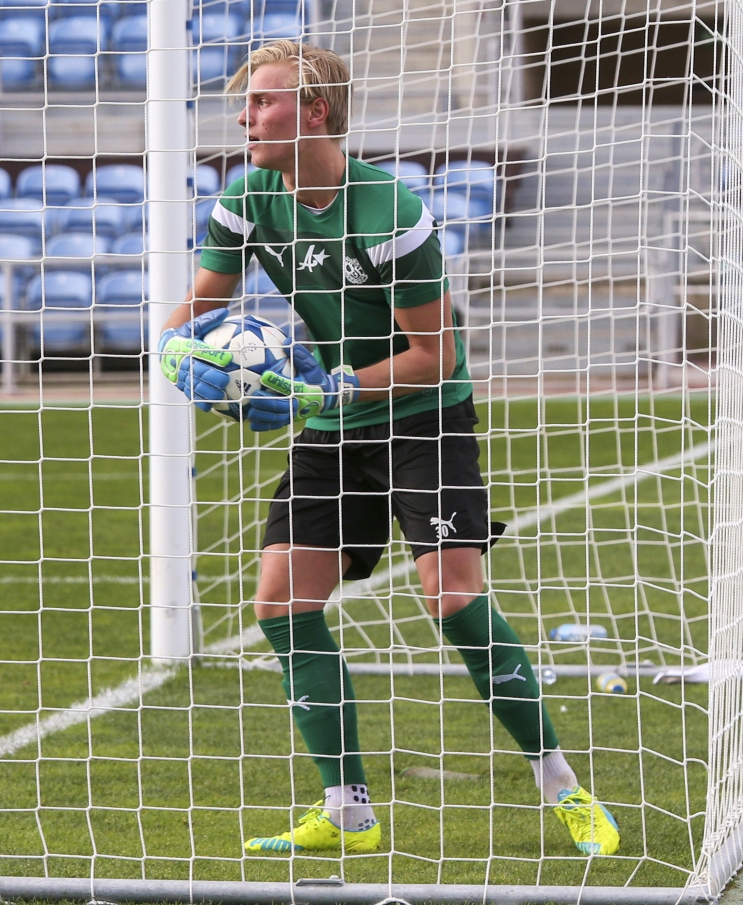
- Rinne with Örebro in 2016

Personal information
- Full name: Jacob Karl Anders Rinne
- Date of birth: 20 June 1993 (age 33)
- Place of birth: Skövde, Sweden
- Height: 1.88 m (6 ft 2 in)
- Position: Goalkeeper

Team information
- Current team: Djurgårdens IF
- Number: 35

Youth career
- –2009: Laxå IF

Senior career*
Years	Team	Apps	(Gls)
2009	Laxå IF		
2010–2013	BK Forward	75	(0)
2013–2016	Örebro SK	37	(0)
2013	→ BK Forward (loan)	2	(0)
2016–2017	Gent	13	(0)
2017–2022	AaB	162	(0)
2022–2024	Al-Fateh	60	(0)
2024–	Djurgårdens IF	39	(0)

International career^{‡}
2012	Sweden U19	1	(0)
2012–2015	Sweden U21	3	(0)
2016–2019	Sweden	3	(0)
Medal record
Men's football
Representing Sweden
UEFA European Under-21 Championship
Winner	2015 Czech Republic
- * Club domestic league appearances and goals as of 16 October 2026 ‡ National team caps and goals as of 21:24, 7 June 2022 (UTC)

Jacob Karl Anders Rinne (born 20 June 1993) is a Swedish professional footballer who plays as a goalkeeper for Allsvenskan club Djurgårdens IF.

== Club career ==
=== Early career ===
In 2010, Rinne joined Division 1 side BK Forward from sixth division side Laxå IF. In January 2013, Rinne went on a two-week trial with Premier League club Everton. On 30 May 2013, Rinne signed for Örebro SK on a three-and-a-half-year contract and was immediately loaned back to BK Forward for the rest of the 2013 season.

=== Örebro SK ===
Rinne made his professional debut for Örebro SK in the first round of the Allsvenskan on 30 March 2014, coming on as a half-time substitute for Oscar Jansson and keeping a clean sheet while playing in Örebro's 2−1 come from behind victory over Halmstads BK. Rinne once again came off the bench on 8 May, replacing the injured Jansson and preserving the clean sheet in a 0−0 draw with Falkenbergs FF. His first start for the club came three days later, conceding two goals as Örebro fell to IFK Göteborg 2−1. Rinne played in the second round of the Svenska Cupen on 20 August 2014, keeping a clean sheet as Örebro defeated Eskilstuna City FK 2−0.

=== Al-Fateh ===
On 30 June 2022, Rinne joined Saudi Arabian club Al-Fateh on a two-year deal. He left the club on 6 August 2024, making him a free agent.

== Personal life ==
Rinne is a supporter of Djurgårdens IF since childhood.

== Career statistics ==
=== International ===
Appearances and goals by national team and year
National team	Year	Apps	Goals
Sweden	2016	1	0
Sweden	2017	0	0
Sweden	2018	1	0
Sweden	2019	1	0
Total		3	0

== Honours ==
Sweden U21

- UEFA European Under-21 Championship: 2015
