= Adam Ståhl =

Swedish footballer

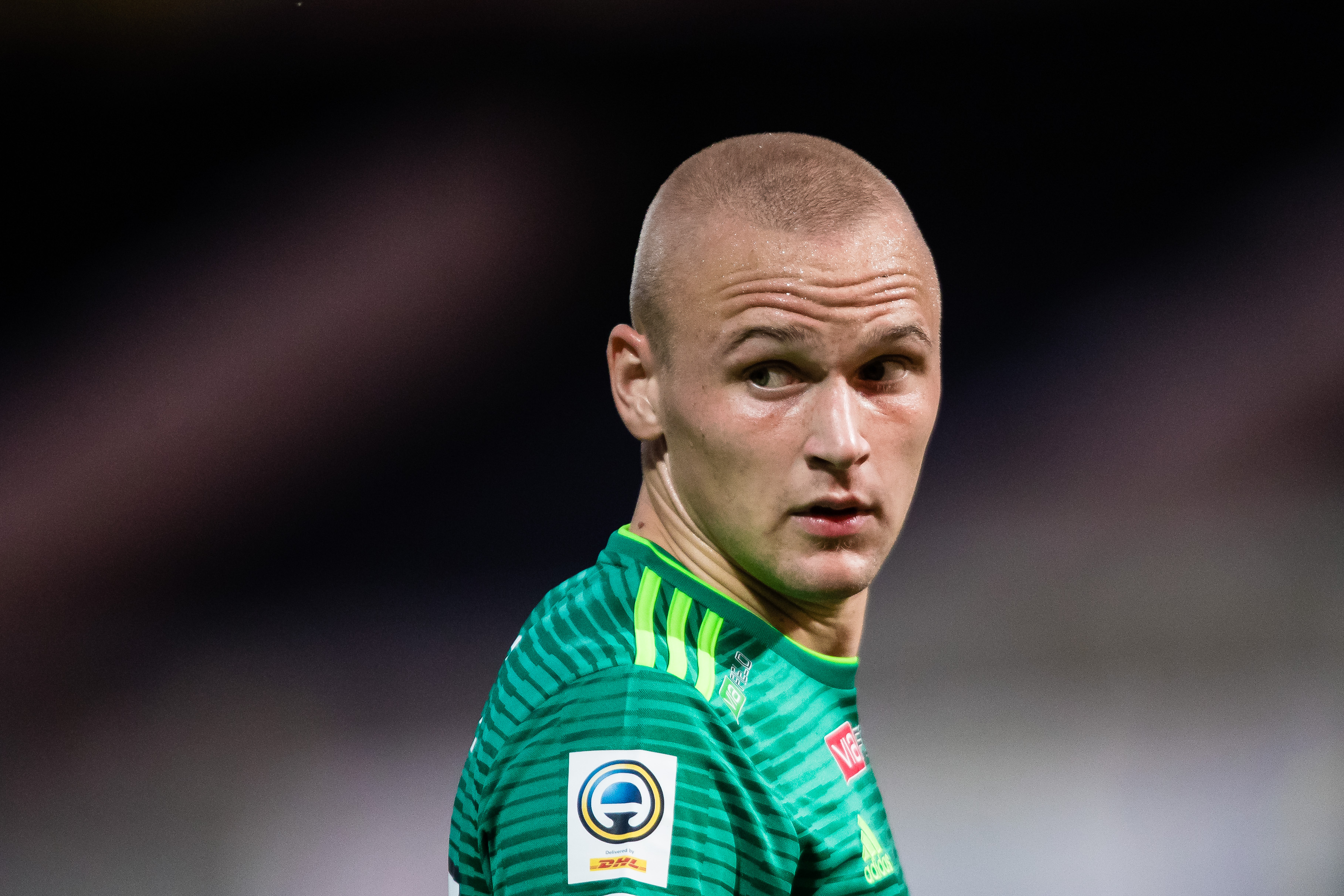
- Ståhl with Dalkurd in 2018

Personal information
- Full name: Adam Mikael Sven Ståhl
- Date of birth: 8 October 1994 (age 32)
- Place of birth: Borås, Sweden
- Height: 1.86 m (6 ft 1 in)
- Position: Defender

Team information
- Current team: Djurgårdens IF
- Number: 18

Youth career
- Brämhults IK
- –2013: IF Elfsborg
- 2013: Norrby IF

Senior career*
| Years | Team | Apps | (Gls) |
| 2014–2017 | Norrby IF | 89 | (14) |
| 2018 | Karabükspor | 8 | (0) |
| 2018 | Dalkurd FF | 11 | (0) |
| 2019–2021 | IK Sirius | 59 | (5) |
| 2022–2024 | Mjällby | 70 | (6) |
| 2024– | Djurgårdens IF | 61 | (6) |
| Total | | 298 | (31) |

International career^{‡}
| 2024– | Finland | 11 | (0) |
- * Club domestic league appearances and goals as of 8 November 2026 ‡ National team caps and goals as of 12 November 2026

Adam Mikael Sven Ståhl (born 8 October 1994) is a professional footballer who plays as a left winger for Allsvenskan club Djurgårdens IF. Born in Sweden, he represents the Finland national team.

== Professional career ==
Ståhl begun his senior footballing career with Norrby IF, and helped them get promoted into the Superettan. He made his Superettan debut for Norrby in a 1–1 tie with Trelleborgs FF on 17 April 2017.

Ståhl signed a two-and-a-half-year contract with Kardemir Karabükspor on 6 January 2018, after a successful season with Norrby IF. Ståhl made his professional debut for Kardemir Karabükspor in a 5-0 Süper Lig loss to İstanbul Başakşehir F.K. on 29 January 2018.

On 11 August 2018, after being released by Kardemir Karabükspor, Ståhl signed with Dalkurd FF in Allsvenskan, Sweden's first tier.

Ståhl signed a 3-year deal with IK Sirius Fotboll on 21 January 2019.

In January 2022 Ståhl signed a deal with Mjällby reaching into 2024.

In July 2024 Ståhl signed a deal with Djurgårdens IF reaching into 2027.

== International career ==
Ståhl was born in Sweden to a Finnish mother and a Swedish father and holds a dual Swedish-Finnish citizenship. In mid-August 2024, it was reported in Swedish and Finnish media that Ståhl had been contacted by the Finland national team head coach Markku Kanerva. Ståhl said in an interview that he had always wanted to represent Finland internationally. On 28 August, Ståhl was named in the Finland squad for the 2024–25 UEFA Nations League B matches against Greece and England in September. He made his international debut for Finland on 7 September 2024 against Greece at the Karaiskakis Stadium. He played the whole game as Greece won 3–0.

Ståhl also played the full 90 minutes against England at Wembley Stadium on 10 September 2024 in 2024–25 UEFA Nations League B.

== Personal life ==
Ståhl's maternal grandparents come from Kokkola, Finland, originally. In his youth, Ståhl and his family spent many summers in Pello, Finland, at his grandmother's house.

== Career statistics ==
As of matches played on 8 November 2026

Club statistics
| Club | Season | League | | | Cups (Note: Includes Svenska Cupen) | | Europe | | Total | |
| Club | Season | Division | Apps | Goals | Apps | Goals | Apps | Goals | Apps | Goals |
|---|---|---|---|---|---|---|---|---|---|---|
| Norrby IF | 2013 | Division 2 | 1 | 0 | 0 | 0 | — | | 1 | 0 |
| Norrby IF | 2014 | Division 1 | 24 | 3 | 2 | 0 | — | | 26 | 3 |
| Norrby IF | 2015 | Division 1 | 22 | 0 | 2 | 0 | — | | 24 | 0 |
| Norrby IF | 2016 | Division 1 | 16 | 4 | 2 | 0 | — | | 18 | 4 |
| Norrby IF | 2017 | Superettan | 26 | 7 | 1 | 0 | — | | 27 | 7 |
| Norrby IF | Total | | 89 | 14 | 7 | 2 | 0 | 0 | 96 | 16 |
| Kardemir Karabükspor | 2017–18 | Süper Lig | 8 | 0 | 0 | 0 | — | | 8 | 0 |
| Kardemir Karabükspor | Total | | 8 | 0 | 0 | 0 | 0 | 0 | 8 | 0 |
| Dalkurd FF | 2018 | Allsvenskan | 11 | 0 | 0 | 0 | — | | 11 | 0 |
| Dalkurd FF | Total | | 11 | 0 | 0 | 0 | 0 | 0 | 11 | 0 |
| IK Sirius | 2019 | Allsvenskan | 18 | 1 | 3 | 0 | — | | 21 | 1 |
| IK Sirius | 2020 | Allsvenskan | 17 | 0 | 1 | 0 | — | | 18 | 0 |
| IK Sirius | 2021 | Allsvenskan | 24 | 4 | 1 | 0 | — | | 25 | 4 |
| IK Sirius | Total | | 59 | 5 | 5 | 0 | 0 | 0 | 64 | 5 |
| Mjällby AIF | 2022 | Allsvenskan | 25 | 1 | 2 | 0 | — | | 27 | 1 |
| Mjällby AIF | 2023 | Allsvenskan | 29 | 3 | 7 | 1 | — | | 36 | 4 |
| Mjällby AIF | 2024 | Allsvenskan | 16 | 2 | 4 | 1 | — | | 20 | 3 |
| Mjällby AIF | Total | | 70 | 6 | 13 | 2 | 0 | 0 | 83 | 8 |
| Djurgårdens IF | 2024 | Allsvenskan | 13 | 1 | 0 | 0 | 10 | 1 | 23 | 2 |
| Djurgårdens IF | 2025 | Allsvenskan | 24 | 4 | 4 | 1 | 5 | 0 | 33 | 5 |
| Djurgårdens IF | 2026 | Allsvenskan | 24 | 1 | 2 | 1 | 0 | 0 | 26 | 2 |
| Djurgårdens IF | Total | | 61 | 6 | 6 | 2 | 15 | 1 | 82 | 9 |
| Career totals | | | 298 | 31 | 31 | 6 | 15 | 1 | 344 | 38 |

=== International ===
As of match played 12 November 2026

Finland
| Year | Apps | Goals |
|---|---|---|
| 2024 | 3 | 0 |
| 2025 | 4 | 0 |
| 2026 | 4 | 0 |
| Total | 11 | 0 |
