= Viktor Granath =

Swedish footballer

Personal information
- Full name: Viktor Erik Vidar Granath
- Date of birth: 3 April 1994 (age 32)
- Place of birth: Sweden
- Height: 1.94 m (6 ft 4 in)
- Position: Forward

Team information
- Current team: Sandhausen
- Number: 12

Youth career
- IF Tymer

Senior career*
Years	Team	Apps	(Gls)
2011–2012	IF Tymer	41	(9)
2013	Ulvåkers IF	17	(6)
2014	Tibro AIK	23	(5)
2015–2021	Skövde AIK	167	(67)
2022	Västerås SK	30	(24)
2023–2024	Halmstads BK	39	(6)
2024–2025	Västerås SK	17	(5)
2025–	Sandhausen	11	(1)
- * Club domestic league appearances and goals as of 24 May 2025

Viktor Granath (born 3 April 1994) is a Swedish footballer who plays as a forward for German club SV Sandhausen.

== Career ==
Granath started his career in the youth ranks of IF Tymer before making his debut for the club in 2011 in Division 5 Västergötland Norra In 2014 he moved to Division 4 team Ulvåkers IF, where he stayed for a season before moving to Tibro AIK in Division 2. His stay in Tibro became just a year before moving to Skövde AIK in 2015 and he stayed with the club until 2021, helping it get promoted from Division 2 Västra Götaland to Superettan.

Granath signed for Västerås SK in Superettan in 2022, where he would not just become the season top goalscorer but also set a new top goalscore record with 24 goals and was voted both Best player and Best forward in Superttan 2022.

His achievements with in Superettan 2022 did not go unnoticed and he was linked with various teams, he eventually signed for Halmstads BK.

On 5 July 2024, Granath moved back to Västerås SK on a contract until end of 2025.

On 21 January 2025, Granath joined German side SV Sandhausen.

== Personal life ==
Viktor has two younger brothers Gustav, with whom he played with at Västerås SK, and Villiam, who plays midfielder for Halmstads BK.

== Honours ==
Individual

- Superettan Top goalscorer: 2022
- Superettan Best forward: 2022
- Superettan Best Player: 2022
