= Malkolm Nilsson Säfqvist =

Swedish footballer

Personal information
- Full name: Malkolm Johan Henrik Nilsson Säfqvist
- Date of birth: 3 August 1993 (age 33)
- Place of birth: Stockholm, Sweden
- Height: 1.93 m (6 ft 4 in)
- Position: Goalkeeper

Youth career
- IS Örnia
- BK Astrio
- 2010–2012: Halmstads BK

Senior career*
Years	Team	Apps	(Gls)
2013–2023	Halmstads BK	161	(1)
2013	→ Lunds BK (loan)	10	(0)
2015	→ Östers IF (loan)	5	(0)
2016	→ Östers IF (loan)	12	(0)
2024–2026	Djurgårdens IF	1	(0)
- * Club domestic league appearances and goals as of 25 May 2026

Malkolm Johan Henrik Nilsson Säfqvist (born 3 August 1993) is a former Swedish footballer.

== Career ==
Malkolm Nilsson was born in Stockholm, but grew up in Halmstad. Nilsson has only played in Halmstad throughout his career. He first played for IS Örnia, before moving to BK Astrio after a couple of seasons. In 2010, he transferred to Halmstads BK and in 2013 he wrote his first senior contract with the club. He made his debut March 10, 2013, after coming on as a substitute against Syrianska FC in Svenska Cupen. Following seasons he's been out on loan in both Lunds BK and Östers IF, both clubs playing in Swedish Division 1 at the time.

Nilsson's Allsvenskan-debut came in Halmstads 2–1-win against Hammarby on October 31, the last game of the 2015 season. At that point, Halmstad were already relegated to Superettan.

== Career statistics ==
=== Club ===
As of 31 January 2023

Club	Season	League			Cup		Continental		Total	
Club	Season	Division	Apps	Goals	Apps	Goals	Apps	Goals	Apps	Goals
Halmstads BK	2013	Allsvenskan	0	0	1	0	—		1	0
Lunds BK (on loan)	2013	Division 1	10	0	0	0	—		10	0
Halmstads BK	2014	Allsvenskan	0	0	1	0	—		1	0
Halmstads BK	2015	Allsvenskan	1	0	2	0	—		3	0
Östers IF (on loan)	2015	Division 1	5	0	0	0	—		5	0
Östers IF (on loan)	2016	Division 1	0	0	—		—		0	0
Östers IF (on loan)	Total		16	0	4	0	0	0	20	0
Halmstads BK	2016	Superettan	1	0	2	0	—		3	0
Halmstads BK	2017	Allsvenskan	4	0	4	0	—		8	0
Halmstads BK	2018	Superettan	30	0	5	0	—		35	0
Halmstads BK	2019	Superettan	30	0	3	0	—		33	0
Halmstads BK	2020	Superettan	30	0	3	0	—		33	0
Halmstads BK	2021	Allsvenskan	29	0	2	0	—		31	0
Halmstads BK	2022	Superettan	30	1	0	0	—		30	1
Halmstads BK	2023	Allsvenskan	0	0	0	0	—		0	0
Halmstads BK	Total		154	1	19	0	0	0	173	1
Career total			170	1	23	0	0	0	193	1
