= Daniel Stensson =

Swedish footballer

Personal information
- Full name: Daniel Tom John Stensson
- Date of birth: 24 March 1997 (age 29)
- Height: 1.78 m (5 ft 10 in)
- Position: Midfielder

Team information
- Current team: Djurgårdens IF
- Number: 13

Youth career
- Djurgårdens IF

Senior career*
Years	Team	Apps	(Gls)
2015–2017	IF Brommapojkarna	30	(0)
2017	→ Assyriska FF	24	(2)
2018–2019	AC Mestre	4	(0)
2019	Akropolis IF	23	(2)
2020	Dalkurd FF	24	(0)
2021–2022	GIF Sundsvall	31	(2)
2022–2024	IK Sirius	57	(3)
2024–	Djurgårdens IF	39	(0)

International career
2013	Sweden U17	3	(0)
- * Club domestic league appearances and goals as of 16 October 2026

Daniel Stensson (born 24 March 1997) is a Swedish footballer who plays as a midfielder for Djurgårdens IF in Allsvenskan.

== Career ==
At the age of 16, Stensson played a four-nation U16 tournament against Finland, Estonia and Latvia. Stensson started his youth career in Djurgårdens IF, but started his senior career in IF Brommapojkarna. Following a relegation from Superettan to Division 1, and loan to fellow third-tier club Assyriska FF, he moved to Italy and Serie C club AC Mestre. The stay in Italy was short and marred by language barriers and not being "super ready to move abroad".

Stensson returned to Division 1 with Akropolis IF, then Superettan with Dalkurd FF and GIF Sundsvall. GIF Sundsvall were promoted from the 2021 Superettan, and Stensson made his Allsvenskan debut in April 2022 against IK Sirius. Shortly after, he was signed by Sirius. In 2023, Stensson became team captain. Sirius had a poor start to the season, and Stensson attracted criticism for faking an injury to draw out the playtime, but Sirius finished the season strongly and climbed several places in the table.

Stensson remained captain of Sirius until he was bought by Djurgårdens IF in August 2024. When Djurgården faced Sirius later that month, Stensson was booed by the Sirius fans.

== Personal life ==
Stensson's maternal grandfather was Italian.

== Career statistics ==
=== Club ===
As of match played 10 November 2024

Appearances and goals by club, season and competition
Club	Season	League			National cup (Note: Includes Svenska Cupen, Coppa Italia)		Continental		Other		Total	
Club	Season	Division	Apps	Goals	Apps	Goals	Apps	Goals	Apps	Goals	Apps	Goals
IF Brommapojkarna	2015	Superettan	19	0	4	0	0	0	—		23	0
IF Brommapojkarna	2016	Division 1	11	0	3	0	—		—		14	0
IF Brommapojkarna	Total		30	0	7	0	0	0	—		37	0
Assyriska FF (loan)	2017	Division 1	24	2	0	0	—		—		24	2
AC Mestre	2017-18	Serie C	4	0	0	0	—		0	0	4	0
Akropolis IF	2019	Division 1	23	2	2	0	—		—		25	2
Dalkurd FF	2020	Superettan	24	0	3	1	—		1 (Note: Appearance(s) in Superettan Promotion/Relegation play-offs)	0	28	1
GIF Sundsvall	2021	Superettan	23	0	3	1	—		—		26	1
GIF Sundsvall	2022	Allsvenskan	9	2	1	0	—		—		10	2
GIF Sundsvall	Total		32	2	4	1	—		—		36	3
IK Sirius	2022	Allsvenskan	15	1	1	0	—		—		16	1
IK Sirius	2023	Allsvenskan	27	2	3	1	—		—		30	3
IK Sirius	2024	Allsvenskan	15	0	0	0	—		—		15	0
IK Sirius	Total		57	3	4	1	—		—		61	4
Djurgårdens IF	2024	Allsvenskan	8	0	1	0	4 (Note: Appearance(s) in UEFA Europa Conference League)	1	—		13	1
Career total			202	9	21	3	4	1	1	0	228	13
