= Oskar Fallenius =

Swedish professional footballer (born 2001)

Personal information
- Full name: Lars Erik Oskar Fallenius
- Date of birth: 1 November 2001 (age 25)
- Place of birth: Nynäshamn, Sweden
- Height: 1.80 m (5 ft 11 in)
- Position: Winger

Team information
- Current team: Djurgårdens IF
- Number: 11

Youth career
- –2010: IF Brommapojkarna
- 2010–2012: Djurgårdens IF
- 2012–2019: IF Brommapojkarna

Senior career*
Years	Team	Apps	(Gls)
2019–2021	IF Brommapojkarna	46	(19)
2021–2023	Brøndby	10	(0)
2022	→ Start (loan)	12	(3)
2023–	Djurgårdens IF	86	(7)

International career^{‡}
2018–2021	Sweden U19	10	(0)
- * Club domestic league appearances and goals as of 16 October 2026 ‡ National team caps and goals as of 12:37, 22 June 2022 (UTC)

Lars Erik Oskar Fallenius (born 1 November 2001) is a Swedish professional footballer who plays as a winger for Djurgårdens IF.

== Career ==
=== Brommapojkarna ===
Raised in Nynäshamn with his father, and having a mother living in Vallentuna, Fallenius started his footballing career with IF Brommapojkarna in 2012. In the summer of 2014, Fallenius played against Juventus in the final of a European youth tournament.

On 29 November 2018, Fallenius signed his first professional contract and was promoted to the first-team squad of Brommapojkarna for the 2019 Superettan season. He made his Superettan debut on 7 April 2019 in a 4–0 win over Dalkurd FF, coming on as a substitute in the 80th minute for Albin Linnér.

=== Brøndby ===
On 4 January 2021, it was announced that Fallenius had signed with Danish Superliga club Brøndby IF on a three-and-a-half-year deal. He made his debut for the club on 4 March, coming on as a half-time substitute for Michael Lumb in a 0–0 draw against Randers.

On 23 September 2021, Fallenius scored his first goal for the club in an 8–1 win over Allerød FK in the Danish Cup third round. In the following round of the cup, he managed to score his second goal as Brøndby beat Aalborg Freja 3–0 at Aalborg Portland Park.

==== Loan to Start ====
On 31 March 2022, Fallenius was sent on loan to Norwegian First Division club Start for one season, with an option for him to return to Brøndby in the summer of 2022. He made his debut on 4 April in a 5–1 win over Åsane, impressing by scoring a brace and providing one assist to Jonatan Braut Brunes, the first cousin of star striker Erling Haaland, who scored a hat-trick. In July 2022, Fallenius got injured and was set to be out for three month. A month later, on 5 August 2022, Brøndby re-called him, so he could focus on his rehabilitation.

== Honours ==
Brøndby

- Danish Superliga: 2020–21
