= Hamadou Karamoko =

French footballer (born 1995)

Personal information
- Date of birth: 31 October 1995 (age 31)
- Place of birth: Paris, France
- Height: 1.95 m (6 ft 5 in)
- Position: Centre-back

Team information
- Current team: Fleury
- Number: 26

Youth career
- –2016: Lorient

Senior career*
Years	Team	Apps	(Gls)
2016	Lorient	3	(0)
2013–2016	Lorient B	54	(0)
2016–2018	Nantes B	35	(1)
2019	Lusitanos Saint-Maur	11	(1)
2019–2021	Red Star	48	(1)
2021–2022	Chambly	26	(0)
2022–2023	Paris 13 Atletico	13	(0)
2023–2025	Progrès Niederkorn	66	(1)
2025–	Fleury	30	(0)
- * Club domestic league appearances and goals as of 23 June 2026

Hamadou Karamoko (born 31 October 1995) is a French professional footballer who plays as a centre-back for Ligue 3 club Fleury.

== Career ==
Karamoko is a youth exponent from Lorient. He signed his first professional contract with the club in May 2015. He made his Ligue 1 debut on 26 January 2016 against Rennes playing the full match .

Following release from Lorient at the end of the 2015–16 season, Karamoko signed an 18 month contract with Nantes in January 2017.

After six months without a club, in February 2019, Karamoko joined Lusitanos Saint-Maur, of the fourth-tier Championnat National 2.

On 18 June 2019, Karamoko signed a two-year contract with Red Star.

On 16 July 2022, Karamoko joined Paris 13 Atletico.

== Personal life ==
Born in France, Karamoko is of Ivorian descent.
