= Oscar Jansson =

Swedish footballer

Personal information
- Full name: Oscar Erik Jansson
- Date of birth: 23 December 1990 (age 35)
- Place of birth: Örebro, Sweden
- Position: Goalkeeper

Team information
- Current team: BK Häcken
- Number: 32

Youth career
- Karlslunds IF
- 2007–2009: Tottenham Hotspur

Senior career*
Years	Team	Apps	(Gls)
2009–2012	Tottenham Hotspur	0	(0)
2009	→ Exeter City (loan)	11	(0)
2010	→ Northampton Town (loan)	4	(0)
2011	→ Bradford City (loan)	1	(0)
2012	→ Shamrock Rovers (loan)	16	(0)
2012	Shamrock Rovers	13	(0)
2013–2020	Örebro SK	219	(0)
2021–2024	IFK Norrköping	102	(0)
2024	Djurgårdens IF	6	(0)
2025–	BK Häcken	5	(0)

International career^{‡}
2005–2007	Sweden U17	8	(0)
2008–2010	Sweden U19	7	(0)
2009–2011	Sweden U21	2	(0)
2014	Sweden	1	(0)
- * Club domestic league appearances and goals as of 12 November 2025 ‡ National team caps and goals as of 21 January 2014

Oscar Erik Jansson (born 23 December 1990) is a Swedish professional footballer who plays as a goalkeeper for BK Häcken.

== Career ==
Jansson was born and raised in Örebro where he played for lower division locals Karlslunds IF HFK before joining Tottenham on 2 January 2007. He was spotted when playing Under-16 European qualifiers for Sweden.

At the beginning of September 2009, he joined Exeter City on a one-month loan deal. He then went on to make his debut away at Gillingham where Exeter lost 3–0. Exeter extended Jansson's loan till the end of October. Exeter again extended Jansson's loan deal into a third and final month until 1 December 2009. He returned to Tottenham Hotspur on 1 December after completing his three-month loan deal with Exeter City. In August 2010 Jansson joined Northampton Town on a short-term loan, returning to Tottenham on 7 September 2010.

On 8 August 2011, Jansson signed a one-month loan deal with Bradford City. After making one League appearance and two Cup appearances for Bradford, Jansson returned to Spurs on 7 September 2011.

Jansson guested for Shamrock Rovers in a friendly at Glentoran in February 2012, and signed until June 2012. After being released from Tottenham, Jansson signed a permanent contract for Rovers until the end of the season.

On 26 December, it was confirmed that Jansson has signed a three-year contract with Örebro SK.

In the summer of 2020 Jansson announced he would leave Örebro for a bigger challenge, and in January 2021 he signed a three-year contract with Swedish top-flight club IFK Norrköping.

In January 2013 Jansson was called up to the Sweden men's national football team for the King's Cup

== Career statistics ==
=== Club ===
As of match played 10 November 2024

Appearances and goals by club, season and competition
Club	Season	League			National cup (Note: Includes FA Cup, FAI Cup, Svenska Cupen)		League cup (Note: Includes EFL Cup, League of Ireland Cup)		Continental		Other		Total	
Club	Season	Division	Apps	Goals	Apps	Goals	Apps	Goals	Apps	Goals	Apps	Goals	Apps	Goals
Exeter City (loan)	2009-10	League One	7	0	0	0	0	0	—		0	0	7	0
Northampton Town (loan)	2010-11	League Two	4	0	0	0	2	0	—		0	0	6	0
Bradford City (loan)	2011-12	League Two	1	0	0	0	1	0	—		1 (Note: Appearance(s) in EFL Trophy)	0	3	0
Shamrock Rovers (loan)	2012	LOI Premier Division	15	0	0	0	0	0	0	0	4 (Note: Appearance(s) in Setanta Sports Cup)	0	19	0
Shamrock Rovers	2012	LOI Premier Division	16	0	2	0	1	0	2 (Note: Appearance(s) in UEFA Champions League)	0	0	0	21	0
Örebro	2013	Superettan	30	0	4	0	—		—		—		34	0
Örebro	2014	Allsvenskan	21	0	0	0	—		—		—		21	0
Örebro	2015	Allsvenskan	17	0	4	0	—		—		—		21	0
Örebro	2016	Allsvenskan	18	0	1	0	—		—		—		19	0
Örebro	2017	Allsvenskan	30	0	2	0	—		—		—		32	0
Örebro	2018	Allsvenskan	30	0	4	0	—		—		—		34	0
Örebro	2019	Allsvenskan	30	0	4	0	—		—		—		34	0
Örebro	2020	Allsvenskan	30	0	4	0	—		—		—		34	0
Örebro	Total		206	0	23	0	—		—		—		229	0
IFK Norrköping	2021	Allsvenskan	30	0	4	0	—		—		—		34	0
IFK Norrköping	2022	Allsvenskan	30	0	4	0	—		—		—		34	0
IFK Norrköping	2023	Allsvenskan	30	0	4	0	—		—		—		34	0
IFK Norrköping	2024	Allsvenskan	12	0	4	0	—		—		—		16	0
IFK Norrköping	Total		102	0	16	0	—		—		—		118	0
Djurgårdens IF	2024	Allsvenskan	6	0	1	0	—		2 (Note: Appearance(s) in UEFA Europa Conference League)	0	—		9	0
Career total			357	0	42	0	4	0	4	0	5	0	412	0

=== International ===
As of match played 21 January 2014

Appearances and goals by national team and year
National team	Year	Apps	Goals
Sweden	2014	1	0
Total		1	0

== Honours ==
- Leinster Senior Cup:
  - Shamrock Rovers – 2012
- Shamrock Rovers Young Player of the Year
  - Shamrock Rovers – 2012
