= Erick Brendon =

Brazilian footballer (born 1995)

Personal information
- Full name: Erick Brendon Pinheiro da Silva
- Date of birth: 23 May 1995 (age 31)
- Place of birth: Niterói, Rio de Janeiro, Brazil
- Height: 1.76 m (5 ft 9 in)
- Position: Midfielder

Team information
- Current team: Penang
- Number: 5

Youth career
- –2016: Botafogo

Senior career*
| Years | Team | Apps | (Gls) |
| 2016 | Botafogo | 0 | (0) |
| 2016 | → America-RJ (loan) | 15 | (0) |
| 2017 | Portuguesa-RJ | 1 | (0) |
| 2018 | Central | | |
| 2018 | Barra da Tijuca | 17 | (4) |
| 2019 | Goytacaz | | |
| 2019–2022 | Värnamo | 74 | (2) |
| 2022–2026 | Östersunds FK | 82 | (6) |
| 2026– | Penang | 9 | (0) |
- * Club domestic league appearances and goals as of 3 May 2026

Erick Brendon Pinheiro da Silva (born 23 May 1995), commonly known as Erick Brendon, is a Brazilian professional footballer who plays as a midfielder for Malaysia Super League club Penang.

== Club career ==
=== IFK Värnamo ===
On 1 July 2019, Erick Brendon joined Sweden Third Division Ettan Fotboll club IFK Värnamo from Goytacaz on permanent deals.

In November 2021, Erick Brendon successfully helped IFK Värnamo secure a promotion spot to Sweden 1st division league Allsvenskan.

=== Östersunds FK ===
On 26 July 2022, Erick Brendon joined Superettan club Östersunds FK on permanent transfer from IFK Värnamo.

On 8 November 2023, Erick Brendon signed an extension contract deal with Östersunds FK after becoming key player of the club.

=== Penang ===
On 6 January 2026, Malaysia Super League club Penang announced the signing of new Brazilian import Erick Brendon on the 2nd transfer window of Malaysia Super League. He joined Penang on permanent deal.

== Career statistics ==
=== Club ===
As of 6 January 2026.

| Club | Season | League | | | State League | | Cup | | Other | | Total | |
| Club | Season | Division | Apps | Goals | Apps | Goals | Apps | Goals | Apps | Goals | Apps | Goals |
|---|---|---|---|---|---|---|---|---|---|---|---|---|
| Botafogo | 2016 | Série A | 0 | 0 | 0 | 0 | 0 | 0 | 0 | 0 | 0 | 0 |
| America-RJ (loan) | 2016 | – | | | 15 (Note: Appearances in the Campeonato Carioca) | 0 | 0 | 0 | 0 | 0 | 15 | 0 |
| Portuguesa-RJ | 2017 | Série D | 0 | 0 | 1 | 0 | 0 | 0 | 0 | 0 | 1 | 0 |
| Barra da Tijuca | 2018 | – | | | 17 (Note: Appearances in the Campeonato Carioca Série B1) | 4 | 0 | 0 | 0 | 0 | 17 | 4 |
| Värnamo | 2019 | Ettan Fotboll | 11 | 0 | – | | 3 (Note: Appearances in the Svenska Cupen) | 0 | 0 | 0 | 14 | 0 |
| Värnamo | 2020 | Ettan Fotboll | 30 | 1 | – | | 0 | 0 | 0 | 0 | 30 | 1 |
| Värnamo | 2021 | Superettan | 26 | 1 | – | | 1 | 0 | 0 | 0 | 27 | 1 |
| Värnamo | 2022 | Allsvenskan | 0 | 0 | – | | 0 | 0 | 0 | 0 | 0 | 0 |
| Värnamo | Total | | 67 | 2 | 0 | 0 | 4 | 0 | 0 | 0 | 71 | 2 |
| Career total | | | 67 | 2 | 33 | 0 | 4 | 0 | 0 | 0 | 104 | 2 |

== Honours ==
Penang

- MFL Challenge Cup runner-up: 2026
