= Simon Gefvert =

Swedish footballer

Personal information
- Date of birth: 28 March 1997 (age 29)
- Position: Midfielder

Team information
- Current team: Västerås
- Number: 11

Youth career
- Ösmo GIF

Senior career*
Years	Team	Apps	(Gls)
2015–2018	IFK Haninge	68	(20)
2019	Karlslunds IF	29	(6)
2020	IK Sirius	6	(0)
2021–	Västerås SK	126	(5)
- * Club domestic league appearances and goals as of 8 July 2026

Simon Gefvert (born 28 March 1997) is a Swedish footballer who plays as a midfielder for Västerås.

== Club career ==
On 29 March 2021, Gefvert signed a three-season contract with Västerås.
