= 2023 Allsvenskan =

99th season of Allsvenskan

Allsvenskan
- Season: 2023
- Dates: 1 April 2023 – 12 November 2023
- Champions: Malmö FF; 26th Allsvenskan title 23rd Swedish title
- Relegated: Degerfors IF; Varbergs BoIS
- Champions League: Malmö FF
- Europa League: IF Elfsborg
- Conference League: BK Häcken; Djurgårdens IF
- Matches: 240
- Goals: 665 (2.77 per match)
- Top goalscorer: Isaac Kiese Thelin (16 goals)
- Biggest home win: IK Sirius 7–0 Varbergs BoIS (16 September 2023)
- Biggest away win: Varbergs BoIS 0–6 Malmö FF (4 May 2023)
- Highest scoring: IF Elfsborg 6–1 Halmstads BK (3 May 2023); IK Sirius 3–4 IF Elfsborg (8 May 2023); BK Häcken 6–1 Degerfors IF (13 May 2023); Hammarby IF 4–3 Djurgårdens IF (14 May 2023); Varbergs BoIS 4–3 IF Brommapojkarna (3 September 2023); IK Sirius 7–0 Varbergs BoIS (16 September 2023); IFK Norrköping 4–3 Varbergs BoIS (6 November 2023)
- Longest winning run: 8 matches IF Elfsborg and Malmö FF
- Longest unbeaten run: 15 matches IF Elfsborg
- Longest winless run: 13 matches Varbergs BoIS
- Longest losing run: 5 matches Varbergs BoIS
- Highest attendance: 41,327; AIK 2–0 Djurgårdens IF (24 September 2023)
- Lowest attendance: 627; IF Brommapojkarna 2–0 Mjällby AIF (24 April 2023)
- Average attendance: 10,017

The 2023 Allsvenskan was the 99th season of Sweden's top-level football league, Allsvenskan. A total of 16 teams participated. BK Häcken were the defending champions after winning the title in the previous season. IF Brommapojkarna and Halmstads BK were promoted after finishing first and second in the 2022 Superettan, while Varbergs BoIS staved off relegation by defeating third placed Östers IF.

Malmö FF clinched their 23rd Swedish championship title and 26th Allsvenskan title on 12 November 2023, the final game day of the regular season, by defeating the other title competitor, IF Elfsborg, 1–0 at home. This was the first time since 2009 that the title was decided in the final round, and the first time since 2009 that it was decided in the final round in a game between the top two teams. IF Brommapojkarna were forced to defend their Allsvenskan status in a relegation series and Degerfors IF and Varbergs BoIS were directly relegated to the 2024 Superettan.

The 2023 Allsvenskan season began on 1 April, and ended on 12 November 2023 (not including play-off matches).

== Teams ==
Location of teams in 2023 Allsvenskan

A total of sixteen teams are contesting the league, including fourteen sides from the previous season, and two promoted teams from the 2022 Superettan.

=== Stadiums and locations ===
Team	Location	Stadium	Turf	Stadium capacity
AIK	Solna	Friends Arena	Natural	50,000
BK Häcken	Gothenburg	Bravida Arena	Artificial	6,500
IF Brommapojkarna	Stockholm	Grimsta IP	Artificial	5,000
Degerfors IF	Degerfors	Stora Valla	Natural	7,500
Djurgårdens IF	Stockholm	Tele2 Arena	Artificial	30,000
Hammarby IF	Stockholm	Tele2 Arena	Artificial	30,000
Halmstads BK	Halmstad	Örjans Vall	Natural	10,873
IF Elfsborg	Borås	Borås Arena	Artificial	16,899
IFK Göteborg	Gothenburg	Gamla Ullevi	Natural	18,600
IFK Norrköping	Norrköping	Nya Parken (Note: Known as Platinumcars Arena for sponsorship reasons.)	Artificial	15,734
IFK Värnamo	Värnamo	Finnvedsvallen	Natural	5,000
IK Sirius	Uppsala	Studenternas IP	Artificial	10,000
Kalmar FF	Kalmar	Guldfågeln Arena	Natural	12,000
Malmö FF	Malmö	Stadion (Note: Known as Eleda Stadion for sponsorship reasons.)	Natural	22,500
Mjällby AIF	Hällevik	Strandvallen	Natural	6,750
Varbergs BoIS	Varberg	Påskbergsvallen	Natural	4,500

=== Personnel and kits ===
All teams are obligated to have the logo of the league sponsor Unibet as well as the Allsvenskan logo on the right sleeve of their shirt.

Note: Flags indicate national team as has been defined under FIFA eligibility rules. Players and Managers may hold more than one non-FIFA nationality.

Team	Head coach	Captain	Kit manufacturer	Main shirt sponsor
AIK	(Norway) Henning Berg	(Sweden) Alexander Milošević	(United States) Nike	Truecaller
BK Häcken	(Norway) Per-Mathias Høgmo	(Sweden) Samuel Gustafson	(Germany) Puma	BRA
Degerfors IF	(Sweden) Andreas Holmberg (Sweden) Tobias Solberg	(Sweden) Sebastian Ohlsson	(England) Umbro	Various
Djurgårdens IF	(Sweden) Kim Bergstrand (Sweden) Thomas Lagerlöf	(Sweden) Magnus Eriksson	(Germany) Adidas	Prioritet Finans
Halmstads BK	(Sweden) Magnus Haglund	(Sweden) Andreas Johansson	(Germany) Puma	
Hammarby IF	(Hungary) Ábel Lőrincz	(Sweden) Nahir Besara	(Sweden) Craft	Huski Chocolate
IF Brommapojkarna	(Sweden) Andreas Engelmark (Sweden) Olof Mellberg	(Sweden) Gustav Sandberg Magnusson	(United States) Nike	Bauhaus
IF Elfsborg	(Sweden) Jimmy Thelin	(Sweden) Johan Larsson	(England) Umbro	Sparbanken Sjuhärad
IFK Göteborg	(Denmark) Jens Berthel Askou	(Sweden) Marcus Berg	(Sweden) Craft	Serneke
IFK Norrköping	(Denmark) Glen Riddersholm	(Sweden) Christoffer Nyman	(Germany) Adidas	Holmen
IFK Värnamo	(Sweden) Kim Hellberg	(Sweden) Freddy Winsth	(Germany) Puma	
IK Sirius	(Sweden) Christer Mattiasson	(Sweden) Daniel Stensson	(Denmark) Select	Various
Kalmar FF	(Denmark) Henrik Jensen	(Brazil) Ricardo Friedrich	(Denmark) Select	Hjältevadshus
Malmö FF	(Sweden) Henrik Rydström	(Denmark) Anders Christiansen	(Germany) Puma	Volkswagen
Mjällby AIF	(Sweden) Anders Torstensson	(Sweden) David Löfquist	(Germany) Puma	Various
Varbergs BoIS	(Sweden) Martin Skogman	(Sweden) Stojan Lukić	(Sweden) Craft	Various

=== Managerial changes ===
Team	Outgoing manager	Manner of departure	Date of vacancy	Table	Incoming manager	Date of appointment
Malmö FF	(Norway) Åge Hareide	End of contract	6 November 2022	Pre-season	(Sweden) Henrik Rydström	17 November 2022
Mjällby AIF	(Sweden) Andreas Brännström	End of contract	8 November 2022	Pre-season	(Sweden) Anders Torstensson	14 November 2022
AIK	(Eritrea) Henok Goitom	End of interim spell	8 November 2022	Pre-season	(Sweden) Andreas Brännström	8 November 2022
IK Sirius	(Sweden) Daniel Bäckström	Signed by Sweden U21	10 November 2022	Pre-season	(Sweden) Christer Mattiasson	5 December 2022
Kalmar FF	(Sweden) Henrik Rydström	Signed by Malmö FF	17 November 2022	Pre-season	(Denmark) Henrik Jensen	28 December 2022
IF Brommapojkarna	(Sweden) Christer Mattiasson	Signed by IK Sirius	5 December 2022	Pre-season	(Sweden) Olof Mellberg (Sweden) Andreas Engelmark	5 December 2022
IFK Göteborg	(Sweden) Mikael Stahre	Sacked	8 March 2023	Pre-season	(Denmark) Jens Berthel Askou	7 June 2023
Varbergs BoIS	(Sweden) Joakim Persson	Signed by AC Horsens	28 June 2023	16th	(Sweden) Martin Skogman (interim)	29 June 2023
AIK	(Sweden) Andreas Brännström	Sacked	2 July 2023	14th	(Norway) Henning Berg	2 July 2023
Hammarby IF	(Spain) Martí Cifuentes	Signed by Queens Park Rangers	30 October 2023	6th	(Hungary) Ábel Lőrincz (interim)	31 October 2023

== Regular season ==
=== League table ===
Pos	Team	Pld	W	D	L	GF	GA	GD	Pts	Qualification or relegation
1	Malmö FF (C)	30	20	4	6	62	27	+35	64	Qualification for the Champions League second qualifying round
2	IF Elfsborg	30	20	4	6	59	26	+33	64	Qualification for the Europa League first qualifying round (Note: The 2023–24 Svenska Cupen winners qualified for the Europa League first qualifying round. Since the cup winners (Malmö FF) qualified based on league position, the Europa League spot was passed to the second-placed team, and the second Conference League second qualifying round spot was passed to the fourth-placed team.)
3	BK Häcken	30	18	3	9	69	39	+30	57	Qualification for the Conference League second qualifying round
4	Djurgårdens IF	30	15	5	10	41	36	+5	50	Qualification for the Conference League second qualifying round
5	IFK Värnamo	30	14	3	13	37	34	+3	45	
6	Kalmar FF	30	13	6	11	35	40	−5	45	
7	Hammarby IF	30	11	11	8	41	39	+2	44	
8	IK Sirius	30	12	6	12	51	44	+7	42	
9	IFK Norrköping	30	12	5	13	45	45	0	41	
10	Mjällby AIF	30	12	5	13	32	34	−2	41	
11	AIK	30	9	9	12	34	38	−4	36	
12	Halmstads BK	30	9	9	12	30	44	−14	36	
13	IFK Göteborg	30	8	10	12	33	37	−4	34	
14	IF Brommapojkarna (O)	30	10	3	17	40	53	−13	33	Qualification for the Allsvenskan play-off
15	Degerfors IF (R)	30	7	5	18	30	62	−32	26	Relegation to Superettan
16	Varbergs BoIS (R)	30	3	6	21	26	67	−41	15	Relegation to Superettan

Source: svenskfotboll.se (in Swedish)
Rules for classification: 1) Points; 2) Goal difference; 3) Goals scored; 4) Head-to-head points; 5) Head-to-head goal difference; 6) Play-off
(Note: Play-off is only played if need to decide champion, teams for relegation or UEFA competition and will be played on a neutral ground).
(C) Champions; (O) Play-off winners; (R) Relegated

=== Positions by round ===
Team ╲ Round	1	2	3	4	5	6	7	8	9	10	11	12	13	14	15	16	17	18	19	20	21	22	23	24	25	26	27	28	29	30
Malmö FF	6	2	1	1	1	1	1	1	1	2	1	1	1	2	3	3	3	2	3	3	2	2	1	1	1	2	2	2	2	1
IF Elfsborg	16	13	7	4	3	3	2	2	2	1	2	2	2	1	1	1	1	1	1	1	1	1	2	2	2	1	1	1	1	2
BK Häcken	3	1	5	2	2	2	3	3	3	3	3	3	3	3	2	2	2	3	2	2	3	3	3	3	3	3	3	3	3	3
Djurgårdens IF	1	4	8	7	6	8	6	8	7	6	7	8	5	4	4	4	4	4	4	5	4	4	4	4	4	4	4	4	4	4
IFK Värnamo	5	9	11	9	10	9	9	10	11	10	10	12	10	11	12	11	11	10	11	10	9	9	9	9	8	8	6	5	5	5
Kalmar FF	13	6	4	3	4	4	5	7	6	5	5	4	4	6	7	6	6	6	8	8	7	8	8	6	7	6	5	7	7	6
Hammarby IF	2	7	12	8	8	10	11	9	10	11	11	10	11	10	8	10	8	8	7	6	6	5	5	5	5	5	7	6	6	7
IK Sirius	9	12	10	14	15	13	14	15	15	13	12	11	12	12	11	12	13	13	12	12	14	15	14	14	11	10	9	10	9	8
IFK Norrköping	10	3	2	5	5	5	4	4	4	4	6	7	7	7	6	5	5	5	5	4	5	6	6	7	6	7	8	8	8	9
Mjällby AIF	8	5	3	6	7	7	8	6	8	9	9	9	9	8	9	8	9	7	6	7	8	7	7	8	9	9	10	9	10	10
AIK	11	16	14	13	14	14	15	13	14	15	15	15	13	14	13	13	12	12	14	15	13	14	13	12	13	11	11	11	12	11
Halmstads BK	4	10	6	10	11	12	10	11	9	8	8	6	6	5	5	7	7	9	9	11	11	10	10	11	12	13	12	12	11	12
IFK Göteborg	12	15	15	16	16	15	13	12	13	14	14	14	15	15	15	15	15	15	15	14	12	12	11	10	10	12	13	13	13	13
IF Brommapojkarna	15	14	16	15	12	6	7	5	5	7	4	5	8	9	10	9	10	11	10	9	10	11	12	13	14	14	14	14	14	14
Degerfors IF	14	8	13	12	9	11	12	14	12	12	12	13	14	13	14	14	14	14	13	13	15	13	15	15	15	15	15	15	15	15
Varbergs BoIS	7	11	9	11	13	16	16	16	16	16	16	16	16	16	16	16	16	16	16	16	16	16	16	16	16	16	16	16	16	16

Leader and Champions League second qualifying round
Conference League second qualifying round
Allsvenskan play-off
Relegation to 2024 Superettan

Source: everysport.com

=== Results by round ===
Team ╲ Round	1	2	3	4	5	6	7	8	9	10	11	12	13	14	15	16	17	18	19	20	21	22	23	24	25	26	27	28	29	30
AIK	L	L	W	L	D	D	L	D	L	L	D	L	W	L	W	D	W	D	D	L	W	L	W	W	L	W	L	D	D	W
BK Häcken	W	W	L	W	W	W	L	W	D	W	W	W	D	W	W	L	W	L	W	W	L	L	W	L	W	D	W	L	W	L
Degerfors IF	L	W	L	L	W	L	L	L	W	D	L	L	L	W	L	L	W	D	W	L	L	W	L	L	L	D	L	D	D	L
Djurgårdens IF	W	D	L	W	L	L	W	L	W	W	D	D	W	W	W	L	W	W	L	D	W	W	L	L	W	W	D	W	L	L
Halmstads BK	W	L	W	L	L	L	W	L	W	W	D	W	D	W	D	D	L	L	L	L	D	W	L	L	L	D	D	D	W	D
Hammarby IF	W	L	L	W	L	L	D	W	D	L	D	W	L	W	W	L	W	D	W	D	W	W	L	W	D	D	D	D	D	D
IF Brommapojkarna	L	L	L	W	W	W	D	W	W	L	W	L	L	L	L	W	L	L	D	W	L	L	L	D	L	L	L	L	W	W
IF Elfsborg	L	D	W	W	W	W	W	W	W	W	D	W	W	W	D	W	L	W	L	W	W	L	L	W	W	W	W	W	D	L
IFK Göteborg	L	L	L	L	D	W	D	D	D	L	L	L	D	L	D	D	W	L	W	W	W	D	W	W	D	L	L	L	D	W
IFK Norrköping	D	W	W	L	D	W	W	W	L	L	L	D	D	L	W	W	L	W	W	W	L	L	L	D	W	L	L	L	W	L
IFK Värnamo	W	L	L	W	L	L	W	L	L	W	L	L	W	L	D	W	L	W	L	W	D	W	W	L	W	W	W	W	D	L
IK Sirius	D	D	D	L	D	D	L	L	L	W	W	W	L	L	W	L	L	L	W	L	L	L	W	W	W	W	W	D	W	W
Kalmar FF	L	W	W	W	D	D	L	L	W	W	D	W	D	L	L	W	L	D	L	D	W	L	W	W	L	W	W	L	L	W
Malmö FF	W	W	W	W	W	W	W	W	D	L	W	W	W	L	L	D	W	W	L	D	W	D	W	W	W	L	W	W	L	W
Mjällby AIF	D	W	W	L	L	D	D	W	L	L	W	L	D	W	L	W	L	W	W	L	L	W	W	L	L	L	D	W	L	W
Varbergs BoIS	D	D	D	L	D	L	L	L	L	D	L	L	L	W	L	L	W	L	L	L	L	W	L	L	L	L	L	D	L	L

Source: Soccerstats.com (in English)
W = Win; D = Draw; L = Lose

=== Results ===
Home \ Away	AIK	BKH	DEG	DIF	HBK	HAM	BP	IFE	IFKG	IFKN	IFKV	IKS	KFF	MFF	MAIF	VAR
AIK		1–2	2–0	2–0	1–1	2–0	2–2	1–2	2–2	0–3	3–1	0–0	1–1	0–0	1–0	3–0
BK Häcken	2–0		6–1	4–1	3–2	3–1	4–2	3–1	4–1	4–1	3–1	3–2	1–3	4–2	3–0	2–0
Degerfors IF	2–1	1–0		2–1	3–1	2–2	2–0	1–2	1–2	0–2	0–2	0–3	1–3	1–2	1–2	1–1
Djurgårdens IF	1–0	1–0	4–1		1–0	0–0	3–1	0–4	1–0	2–2	1–2	2–4	3–1	2–0	2–0	2–0
Halmstads BK	2–1	1–0	0–0	2–0		0–0	0–2	0–1	0–0	1–3	2–2	2–1	3–0	0–1	1–1	0–5
Hammarby	4–2	2–2	3–1	4–3	2–2		2–1	1–0	1–1	2–1	0–2	2–2	3–1	1–3	0–0	2–0
IF Brommapojkarna	0–2	2–1	1–2	1–2	3–1	1–0		0–3	0–0	2–2	0–2	1–2	2–3	1–2	2–0	2–1
IF Elfsborg	3–0	0–2	2–2	1–1	6–1	2–0	5–0		1–1	3–2	2–0	1–0	0–3	3–0	2–0	2–1
IFK Göteborg	1–1	4–2	6–0	2–1	0–0	1–1	1–0	1–2		1–1	0–1	0–1	2–0	0–1	0–1	1–2
IFK Norrköping	3–1	2–2	1–0	0–2	1–2	2–0	0–2	1–2	3–0		2–1	1–1	1–0	0–1	0–2	4–3
IFK Värnamo	1–0	1–0	0–1	1–2	0–0	0–0	0–1	1–0	3–1	2–1		0–1	0–1	1–3	0–1	3–1
IK Sirius	0–1	1–4	3–2	0–0	1–2	1–2	3–2	3–4	2–0	2–0	2–0		3–0	1–3	2–3	7–0
Kalmar FF	1–1	1–0	2–1	2–1	2–0	0–0	1–3	0–4	2–0	2–1	1–3	2–2		1–0	0–2	1–0
Malmö FF	3–1	2–2	5–0	0–0	3–0	4–2	2–1	1–0	2–2	3–0	3–1	3–0	1–0		1–2	5–0
Mjällby AIF	0–0	2–1	2–0	0–1	0–2	0–3	1–2	0–1	0–1	1–2	2–3	3–0	1–1	1–0		2–2
Varbergs BoIS	1–2	0–2	1–1	0–1	1–2	0–1	4–3	0–0	1–2	1–3	0–3	1–1	0–0	0–6	0–3	

Source: Swedish Football Association (in Swedish)
Legend: Blue = home team win; Yellow = draw; Red = away team win.
For upcoming matches, an "a" indicates there is an article about the rivalry between the two participants.

== Allsvenskan play-off ==
The fourteenth-placed team (IF Brommapojkarna) faced the third-placed team from the 2023 Superettan (Utsiktens BK) in a two-legged tie for the final place in the 2024 Allsvenskan. The loser ended up in the 2024 Superettan.

24 November 2023
19:00

Utsiktens BK	0–7	IF Brommapojkarna
		Vasić 3', 28', 69'; Fritzson 11'; Timossi Andersson 44'; Johansson 84', 90'

Bravida Arena, Gothenburg
27 November 2023
19:00

IF Brommapojkarna	0–0	Utsiktens BK

Grimsta IP, Stockholm

IF Brommapojkarna won 7–0 on aggregate.

== Season statistics ==
=== Top scorers ===
As of 12 November 2023

Rank	Player	Club	Goals
1	(Sweden) Isaac Kiese Thelin	Malmö FF	16
2	(Ivory Coast) Bénie Traoré	BK Häcken	12
3	(Montenegro) Viktor Đukanović	Hammarby IF	11
3	(Sweden) Gustav Engvall	IFK Värnamo	11
3	(Sweden) Sebastian Nanasi	Malmö FF	11
3	(Denmark) Jeppe Okkels	IF Elfsborg	11
7	(Denmark) Wessam Abou Ali	IK Sirius	10
7	(Sweden) Joakim Persson	IK Sirius	10

=== Top goalkeepers ===
As of 12 November 2023
(Minimum of 10 games played)

Rank	Goalkeeper	Club	GP	GA	SV%	CS
1	(Iceland) Hákon Valdimarsson	IF Elfsborg	29	22	78	13
2	(Norway) Jonathan Rasheed	IFK Värnamo	22	N/A	77	7
3	(Sweden) Malkolm Nilsson Säfqvist	Halmstads BK	16	N/A	75	6
4	(Brazil) Ricardo Friedrich	Kalmar FF	27	N/A	74	8
5	(Sweden) Noel Törnqvist	Mjällby AIF	27	N/A	73	7
5	(Sweden) Peter Abrahamsson	BK Häcken	30	39	73	5
7	(Sweden) Oliver Dovin	Hammarby IF	29	N/A	72	9
8	(Sweden) Jacob Widell Zetterström	Djurgårdens IF	23	N/A	71	10
9	(Sweden) Johan Dahlin	Malmö FF	29	N/A	70	12
9	(Sweden) Filip Sidklev	IF Brommapojkarna	20	N/A	70	5

=== Hat-tricks ===
As of 12 November 2023

Player	For	Against	Result	Date
(Sweden) Isaac Kiese Thelin	Malmö FF	Hammarby IF	4–2	30 April 2023
(Sweden) Sebastian Nanasi	Malmö FF	Varbergs BoIS	6–0	4 May 2023
(Sweden) Joakim Persson	IK Sirius	Varbergs BoIS	7–0	16 September 2023
(Sweden) Momodou Sonko	BK Häcken	IFK Norrköping	4–1	22 October 2023
(Sweden) Joakim Persson	IK Sirius	Djurgårdens IF	4–2	4 November 2023
(Cyprus) Ioannis Pittas	AIK Fotboll	IFK Varnamo	3–1	12 November 2023

=== Discipline ===
==== Player ====
- Most yellow cards: 9
  - Adam Carlén (IFK Göteborg)
  - Jesper Ceesay (IFK Norrköping)
  - Anton Eriksson (IFK Norrköping)
  - Rasmus Schüller (Djurgårdens IF)
  - Robin Tranberg (Varbergs BoIS)
- Most red cards: 2
  - Ricardo Friedrich (Kalmar FF)
  - Anders Trondsen (IFK Göteborg)

==== Club ====
- Most yellow cards:
- Most red cards:

== Awards ==
=== Monthly awards ===
Month	Manager of the Month		Player of the Month	
Month	Manager	Club	Player	Club
April	(Sweden) Henrik Rydström	Malmö FF	(Sweden) Isaac Kiese Thelin	Malmö FF
May	(Sweden) Jimmy Thelin	IF Elfsborg	(Sweden) Jacob Ondrejka	IF Elfsborg
July	(Sweden) Jimmy Thelin	IF Elfsborg	(Denmark) Jeppe Okkels	IF Elfsborg
August	(Denmark) Jens Berthel Askou	IFK Göteborg	(Iceland) Arnór Ingvi Traustason	IFK Norrköping
September	(Denmark) Jens Berthel Askou	IFK Göteborg	(Albania) Arbnor Muçolli	IFK Göteborg
October	(Sweden) Kim Hellberg	IFK Värnamo	(Sweden) Sebastian Nanasi	Malmö FF

=== Annual awards ===
Award	Winner	Club
Player of the Year	(Sweden) Sebastian Nanasi	Malmö FF
Goalkeeper of the Year	(Iceland) Hákon Valdimarsson	IF Elfsborg
Defender of the Year	(Sweden) Gustaf Lagerbielke	IF Elfsborg
Midfielder of the Year	(Sweden) Sebastian Nanasi	Malmö FF
Forward of the Year	(Sweden) Isaac Kiese Thelin	Malmö FF
Young Player of the Year	(Sweden) Momodou Sonko	BK Häcken
Coach of the Year	(Sweden) Jimmy Thelin	IF Elfsborg

== See also ==
Competitions

- 2023 Superettan
- 2023 Division 1
- 2022–23 Svenska Cupen
- 2023–24 Svenska Cupen

Team seasons

- 2023 Djurgårdens IF season
- 2023 Hammarby Fotboll season
- 2023 Malmö FF season

== Attendances ==
AIK Fotboll drew the highest average home attendance in the 2023 edition of the Swedish top-flight football league.

#	Football club	Home games	Average attendance
1	AIK Fotboll	15	25,740
2	Hammarby IF	15	22,543
3	Malmö FF	15	20,055
4	Djurgårdens IF	15	19,331
5	IFK Göteborg	15	16,190
6	IF Elfsborg	15	9,445
7	IFK Norrköping	15	8,051
8	Halmstads BK	15	6,607
9	Kalmar FF	15	6,513
10	IK Sirius	15	6,330
11	BK Häcken	15	4,867
12	Degerfors IF	15	3,820
13	Mjällby AIF	15	3,565
14	IFK Värnamo	15	2,717
15	Varbergs BoIS	15	2,638
16	IF Brommapojkarna	15	2,002
