= 2025 Mjällby AIF season =

Mjällby AIF
2025 season
- Manager: Anders Torstensson
- Stadium: Strandvallen
- Allsvenskan: 1st
- 2024–25 Svenska Cupen: Quarter-finals
- 2025–26 Svenska Cupen: Group stage
- Top goalscorer: League: Elliot Stroud (10); All: Elliot Stroud (12)
- Average home league attendance: 5,099
- Biggest win: 5–0 v Gefle IF (Away, 23 February 2025, 2024–25 Svenska Cupen); 5–0 v IFK Värnamo (Away, 3 November 2025, Allsvenskan)
- Biggest defeat: 0–1 v BK Häcken (Home, 8 March 2025, 2024–25 Svenska Cupen); 1–2 v AIK (Away, 11 May 2025, Allsvenskan)

The 2025 season was Mjällby Allmänna Idrottsförening's 6th consecutive season in the Allsvenskan. In addition to the domestic league, the club participated in the 2024–25 Svenska Cupen and the 2025–26 Svenska Cupen.

== Squad ==
Squad at end of season

Note: Flags indicate national team as defined under FIFA eligibility rules; some limited exceptions apply. Players may hold more than one non-FIFA nationality.

No.	Pos.	Nation	Player
1	GK	SWE	Noel Törnqvist (on loan from Como)
2	DF	SWE	Ludvig Svanberg
3	DF	CMR	Christian Tchouante
4	DF	SWE	Axel Norén
5	DF	PAK	Abdullah Iqbal
6	MF	SWE	Ludwig Małachowski Thorell
7	MF	SWE	Viktor Gustafson
10	MF	DEN	Jeppe Kjær
11	DF	FIN	Timo Stavitski
14	DF	SWE	Herman Johansson
15	MF	NOR	Bork Bang-Kittilsen
16	FW	SWE	Alexander Johansson

No.	Pos.	Nation	Player
17	DF	SWE	Elliot Stroud
18	FW	SWE	Jacob Bergström
19	FW	GAM	Abdoulie Manneh
20	MF	SWE	Måns Isaksson
21	MF	SWE	Adam Petersson
22	MF	SWE	Jesper Gustavsson
24	DF	SWE	Tom Pettersson
26	DF	NGA	Uba Charles (on loan from Lillestrøm)
27	DF	SWE	Ludvig Tidstrand
33	DF	FIN	Tony Miettinen
35	GK	SWE	Alexander Lundin
39	MF	SWE	Romeo Leandersson

== Transfers ==
=== Winter ===
In:

No.	Pos.	Nation	Player
4	DF	SWE	Axel Norén (from GAIS)
6	MF	SWE	Ludwig Małachowski Thorell (from Sandviken)
9	FW	UGA	Calvin Kabuye (from Sandviken)
15	FW	NOR	Bork Bang-Kittilsen (from (Norway) Odd)
20	MF	SWE	Måns Isaksson (from Jönköping Södra)
26	DF	NGA	Uba Charles (on loan from (Norway) Lillestrøm)
33	DF	FIN	Tony Miettinen (from (Norway) Odd)

Out:

No.	Pos.	Nation	Player
3	DF	SWE	Arvid Brorsson (to (Italy) Monza)
4	DF	SWE	Rasmus Wikström (to Elfsborg)
6	MF	SWE	Imam Jagne (to Göteborg)
8	MF	SWE	Manasse Kusu (on loan to (Finland) Jaro)
15	DF	SWE	Liam Svensson (on loan to Trollhättan)
20	DF	SWE	Johan Persson Åhstedt (on loan to Hässleholm)
23	DF	SWE	Filip Åkesson Linderoth (on loan to Hässleholm)
26	MF	SWE	Kimmen Nennesson (on loan to Nosaby)
29	MF	SWE	Isac Johnsson (on loan to Kristianstad)
30	GK	SWE	Hugo Fagerberg (on loan to Ängelholm)
—	FW	SWE	Love Björnson (on loan to Lund, previously on loan at Eskilstuna)
—	FW	NGA	Yusuf Abdulazeez (on loan to Norrby, previously on loan at Varberg)
—	MF	ISL	Guðmundur Baldvin Nökkvason (to (Iceland) Stjarnan, previously on loan)

=== Summer ===
In:

No.	Pos.	Nation	Player
2	DF	SWE	Ludvig Svanberg (from Sundsvall)
3	DF	CMR	Christian Tchouante (from (United States) Ventura County)
10	MF	DEN	Jeppe Kjær (from (Norway) Bodø/Glimt)
—	MF	SWE	Teo Helge (from Norrby)

Out:

No.	Pos.	Nation	Player
9	FW	UGA	Calvin Kabuye (on loan to Varberg)
10	MF	DEN	Nicklas Røjkjær (to (Denmark) Nordsjælland)
13	DF	DEN	Jakob Kiilerich (to (Belgium) Zulte Waregem)
25	DF	KOS	Argjend Miftari (on loan to Karlstad)
—	MF	SWE	Teo Helge (on loan to Norrby)
—	MF	SWE	Filip Åkesson Linderoth (on loan to Sölvesborg, previously on loan at Hässleholm)

== Competitions ==
=== Overview ===
Competition	First match	Last match	Starting round	Final position	Record							
Competition	First match	Last match	Starting round	Final position	Pld	W	D	L	GF	GA	GD	Win %
Allsvenskan	30 March 2025	9 November 2025	Matchday 1	Winners	30	23	6	1	57	18	+39	76.67
2024–25 Svenska Cupen	16 February 2025	8 March 2025	Progressed	Quarter-finals	4	3	0	1	12	1	+11	75.00
2025–26 Svenska Cupen	20 August 2025	20 August 2025	Round 2	Progressed	1	1	0	0	2	1	+1	100.00
Total					35	27	6	2	71	20	+51	77.14

Source: Competitions

=== Allsvenskan ===
==== League table ====
Pos	Team	Pld	W	D	L	GF	GA	GD	Pts	Qualification or relegation
1	Mjällby AIF (C)	30	23	6	1	57	18	+39	75	Qualification for the Champions League second qualifying round
2	Hammarby IF	30	19	5	6	60	29	+31	62	Qualification for the Europa League second qualifying round (Note: The 2025–26 Svenska Cupen winners qualifies for the Europa League second qualifying round. Since the cup winners (Mjällby AIF) qualified based on league position, the Europa League spot was passed to the second-placed team, and the second Conference League second qualifying round spot was passed to the fourth-placed team.)
3	GAIS	30	14	10	6	45	30	+15	52	Qualification for the Conference League second qualifying round
4	IFK Göteborg	30	16	3	11	41	33	+8	51	Qualification for the Conference League second qualifying round
5	Djurgårdens IF	30	13	10	7	52	32	+20	49	

Source: svenskfotboll.se (in Swedish)
Rules for classification: 1) Points; 2) Goal difference; 3) Goals scored; 4) Head-to-head points; 5) Head-to-head goal difference; 6) Head-to-head away goals scored; 7) Play-off
(Note: Play-off is only played if need to decide champion, teams for relegation or UEFA competition and will be played on a neutral ground).
(C) Champions

==== Results summary ====
Overall								Home						Away					
Pld	W	D	L	GF	GA	GD	Pts	W	D	L	GF	GA	GD	W	D	L	GF	GA	GD
30	23	6	1	57	18	+39	75	11	4	0	25	8	+17	12	2	1	32	10	+22

Source: Worldfootball

==== Results by round ====
Round	1	2	3	4	5	6	7	8	9	10	11	12	13	14	15	16	17	18	19	20	21	22	23	24	25	26	27	28	29	30
Ground	A	H	A	H	A	H	H	A	A	H	A	H	H	A	A	H	H	A	A	H	A	H	A	H	A	H	A	H	A	H
Result	D	D	W	W	W	W	W	L	W	W	D	W	D	W	W	W	W	W	W	D	W	W	W	D	W	W	W	W	W	W
Position	9	11	6	3	3	2	1	3	2	1	3	1	2	2	1	1	1	1	1	1	1	1	1	1	1	1	1	1	1	1
Points	1	2	5	8	11	14	17	17	20	23	24	27	28	31	34	37	40	43	46	47	50	53	56	57	60	63	66	69	72	75

Source: Worldfootball
A = Away; H = Home; W = Win; D = Draw; L = Loss

==== Matches ====
30 March 2025 1	IF Elfsborg	2–2	Mjällby AIF	Borås
14:00 CEST (UTC+2)	Silverholt 60'; Magnússon (yellow card) 74'; Sigurpálsson 78'; Wikström (yellow card) 90+2'	Report	Røjkjær 20'; H. Johansson 29'	Stadium: Borås Arena; Attendance: 8,025; Referee: Kristoffer Karlsson; Assistant referees: Mikael Hallin, Daniel Gustavsson; Fourth official: Fredrik Alknäs

6 April 2025 2	Mjällby AIF	1–1	GAIS	Hällevik
16:30 CEST (UTC+2)	Gustavsson (yellow card) 34'; Małachowski (yellow card) 74'; Pettersson 90+6'	Report	Ågren (yellow card) 42'; Diabate 90'; Frej (yellow card) 90+4'	Stadium: Strandvallen; Attendance: 3,682; Referee: Joakim Sars; Assistant referees: Robin Wilde, Mirza Rovcanin; Fourth official: Per Melin

12 April 2025 3	BK Häcken	0–3	Mjällby AIF	Gothenburg
15:00 CEST (UTC+2)	Andersen (yellow card) 9'	Report	Norén 45+1'; Manneh 72'; Augustsson (yellow card) 72' (not on pitch); Røjkjær 75'; Bang-Kittilsen (yellow card) 80'; Iqbal (yellow card) 87'	Stadium: Bravida Arena; Attendance: 4,058; Referee: Richard Sundell; Assistant referees: Daniel Gustavsson, Jonas Dahl; Fourth official: Pontus Karlsson

18 April 2025 4	Mjällby AIF	3–1	Hammarby IF	Hällevik
15:00 CEST (UTC+2)	H. Johansson 7'; Norén (yellow card) 22'; Røjkjær 33'; Małachowski 45+1'; Iqbal (yellow card) 56'; Gustafson (yellow card) 90'	Report	Madjed 17'	Stadium: Strandvallen; Attendance: 5,941; Referee: Fredrik Klitte; Assistant referees: Pär Leek, Niclas Hummelgren; Fourth official: Adi Aganovic

23 April 2025 5	Halmstads BK	1–3	Mjällby AIF	Halmstad
19:00 CEST (UTC+2)	Agnero (yellow card) 8', (goal) 45'; Wallentin (yellow card) 78'	Report	Røjkjær 24'; Manneh 54'; H. Johansson 73'; Stroud (yellow card) 90+1'	Stadium: Örjans Vall; Attendance: 3,652; Referee: Glenn Nyberg; Assistant referees: Andreas Söderkvist, Sebastian Robertsson; Fourth official: Kristoffer Karlsson

27 April 2025 6	Mjällby AIF	4–1	Degerfors IF	Hällevik
14:00 CEST (UTC+2)	Manneh 2', 17', 54', (yellow card) 54'; H. Johansson (yellow card) 25', (goal) 32'; Gustafson (yellow card) 61'	Report	Morgado (yellow card) 48'; Fisic (yellow card) 65'; S. Ohlsson II 88'	Stadium: Strandvallen; Attendance: 3,241; Referee: Adi Aganovic; Assistant referees: Marcus Klitte, Jonas Dahl; Fourth official: Dino Demo

4 May 2025 7	Mjällby AIF	1–0	IFK Göteborg	Hällevik
16:30 CEST (UTC+2)	Røjkjær 30'	Report	Þórðarson (yellow card) 90'	Stadium: Strandvallen; Attendance: 5,496; Referee: Mohammed Al-Hakim; Assistant referees: Robin Wilde, Alexander Milovanovic; Fourth official: Per Melin

11 May 2025 8	AIK	2–1	Mjällby AIF	Solna
14:00 CEST (UTC+2)	V. Andersson 23'; Csongvai (yellow card) 27'; Salétros 61'; Nordfeldt (yellow card) 90+1'; Guidetti (penalty missed) 90+6'	Report	Stroud 10'; Norén (yellow card) 21'; H. Johansson (yellow card) 82'; Aksum (yellow card) 90+5' (not on pitch); Lundgårdh (yellow card) 90+5' (not on pitch)	Stadium: Nationalarenan; Attendance: 28,448; Referee: Richard Sundell; Assistant referees: Mehmet Culum, Niclas Hummelgren; Fourth official: Marcus Holmberg

15 May 2025 9	Djurgårdens IF	1–3	Mjällby AIF	Stockholm
19:00 CEST (UTC+2)	Priske 15'; Gulliksen (yellow card) 59'; Une (yellow card) 88'	Report	Pettersson 38'; Małachowski (yellow card) 45+1'; Norén (yellow card) 45+3'; Stroud (yellow card) 56', (goal) 73'; Gustavsson (yellow card) 61'; A. Johansson 90'	Stadium: 3Arena; Attendance: 14,585; Referee: Tess Olofsson; Assistant referees: Daniel Yng, Almira Spahic; Fourth official: Farouk Nehdi

19 May 2025 10	Mjällby AIF	1–0	IF Brommapojkarna	Hällevik
19:00 CEST (UTC+2)	Manneh 23'; Pettersson (yellow card) 55'; Gustavsson (yellow card) 59'	Report	Hovland (yellow card) 5'; Ackermann (yellow card) 29'	Stadium: Strandvallen; Attendance: 3,583; Referee: Granit Maqedonci; Assistant referees: Robin Wilde, Mirza Rovcanin; Fourth official: Arianit Abazi

22 May 2025 18	Hammarby IF	1–2	Mjällby AIF	Stockholm
19:00 CEST (UTC+2)	Madjed 43'	Report	Małachowski 21'; A. Johansson 65'; Torstensson (yellow card) 71' (not on pitch); Iqbal (yellow card) 89'; Gustafson (yellow card) 90+1'	Stadium: 3Arena; Attendance: 21,798; Referee: Oscar Johnson; Assistant referees: Andreas Svensson, Sebastian Robertsson; Fourth official: Victor Wolf

26 May 2025 11	IFK Norrköping	1–1	Mjällby AIF	Norrköping
19:00 CEST (UTC+2)	Brönner (yellow card) 17'; Neffati (yellow card) 41'; Peprah Oppong (yellow card) 51'; Traustason 85'	Report	Bergström (yellow card) 40'; Małachowski 43'; Charles (yellow card) 45+5'	Stadium: Nya Parken; Attendance: 5,463; Referee: Adam Ladebäck; Assistant referees: Niklas Nyberg, Daniel Yng; Fourth official: George Jansizian

1 June 2025 12	Mjällby AIF	2–0	IFK Värnamo	Hällevik
16:30 CEST (UTC+2)	Bergström (yellow card) 28'; A. Johansson 74', 90+1'	Report	Kalu (yellow card) 53'; Adjei (yellow card) 69'; Björnström (yellow card) 90+4'	Stadium: Strandvallen; Attendance: 4,302; Referee: Erik Mattsson; Assistant referees: Mehmet Culum, Daniel Gustavsson; Fourth official: Fredrik Klitte

30 June 2025 13	Mjällby AIF	1–1	Malmö FF	Hällevik
19:00 CEST (UTC+2)	Stroud (yellow card) 35', (yellow card) 73'; Małachowski (yellow card) 48'; A. Johansson (yellow card) 87'; P. Andersson (yellow card) 89' (not on pitch)	Report	Ali (yellow card) 9'; Friedrich (yellow card) 13'; Rösler (red card) 87'; Ellborg (yellow card) 90+7'	Stadium: Strandvallen; Attendance: 5,969; Referee: Joakim Sars; Assistant referees: Simon Kristensson, Niclas Hummelgren; Fourth official: Kristoffer Karlsson

5 July 2025 14	Östers IF	0–1	Mjällby AIF	Växjö
15:00 CEST (UTC+2)	Foyston (yellow card) 23' (not on pitch); Bergquist (yellow card) 68'; Adolfsson (yellow card) 78'; Söderberg (yellow card) 90+5'	Report	Stavitski (yellow card) 15'; Iqbal (yellow card) 57'; Bergström 66'; Leandersson (yellow card) 90+5'	Stadium: Spiris Arena; Attendance: 6,910; Referee: Richard Sundell; Assistant referees: Robin Wilde, Alexander Milovanovic; Fourth official: Oscar Johnson

14 July 2025 15	IK Sirius	1–2	Mjällby AIF	Uppsala
19:00 CEST (UTC+2)	Persson 80'; Westerberg (yellow card) 90' (not on pitch)	Report	Stroud 7'; Bergström 16', (yellow card) 55'	Stadium: Studenternas IP; Attendance: 6,244; Referee: Victor Wolf; Assistant referees: Daniel Gustavsson, Sebastian Robertsson; Fourth official: Odai Al Wani

20 July 2025 16	Mjällby AIF	2–0	AIK	Hällevik
14:00 CEST (UTC+2)	Stroud 55'; Gustavsson (yellow card) 58'; Małachowski (yellow card) 66'; Tidstrand 83'	Report	Salétros (yellow card) 45+3'; Nordfeldt (yellow card) 49'; Beširović (yellow card) 55'	Stadium: Strandvallen; Attendance: 5,982; Referee: Fredrik Klitte; Assistant referees: Fredrik Klyver, Pär Leek; Fourth official: Arianit Abazi

27 July 2025 17	Mjällby AIF	2–1	IK Sirius	Hällevik
16:30 CEST (UTC+2)	Gustafson 54'; Stavitski 65'	Report	Ure 7'	Stadium: Strandvallen; Attendance: 5,386; Referee: Mohammed Al-Hakim; Assistant referees: Fredrik Klyver, Sebastian Robertsson; Fourth official: Mohamed Rachid

9 August 2025 19	Malmö FF	1–3	Mjällby AIF	Malmö
15:00 CEST (UTC+2)	Stryger (yellow card) 64'; Busanello (yellow card) 64'; Busuladžić 70'	Report	Torstensson (yellow card) 3' (not on pitch); Iqbal (yellow card) 21'; H. Johansson 50'; Stroud 58'; Gustavsson (yellow card) 72'; Bergström (yellow card) 79'; Gustafson 90+3'	Stadium: Stadion; Attendance: 20,212; Referee: Kristoffer Karlsson; Assistant referees: Mahbod Beigi, Andreas Söderkvist; Fourth official: Fredrik Klitte

17 August 2025 20	Mjällby AIF	1–1	Djurgårdens IF	Hällevik
16:30 CEST (UTC+2)	Gustavsson (yellow card) 63'; Torstensson (yellow card) 85' (not on pitch); Stroud (yellow card) 89'; Aksum (yellow card) 89' (not on pitch); Charles 90+5'	Report	Siltanen (yellow card) 30'; Nguen 35'; Priske (yellow card) 53'; Finndell (yellow card) 68'; Kosugi (yellow card) 89'; Rinne (yellow card) 90+3'	Stadium: Strandvallen; Attendance: 5,780; Referee: Victor Wolf; Assistant referees: Mikael Hallin, Per Rehnlund; Fourth official: Fredrik Klitte

25 August 2025 21	GAIS	0–2	Mjällby AIF	Gothenburg
19:00 CEST (UTC+2)		Report	Norén (yellow card) 32'; Manneh 64'; H. Johansson 87'; Iqbal (yellow card) 90+1'; Aksum (yellow card) 93' (not on pitch)	Stadium: Gamla Ullevi; Attendance: 9,875; Referee: Richard Sundell; Assistant referees: Andreas Söderkvist, Anton Sjöberg; Fourth official: Joakim Sars

30 August 2025 22	Mjällby AIF	1–0	Halmstads BK	Hällevik
17:30 CEST (UTC+2)	Stroud 80'; Manneh (yellow card) 83'	Report	Yeboah (yellow card) 41'; Granath (yellow card) 49'; Kaib (yellow card) 75'; Mohammed (yellow card) 84'; Kurtulus (yellow card) 90+8'	Stadium: Strandvallen; Attendance: 5,376; Referee: Joakim Sars; Assistant referees: Robin Wilde, Simon Kristensson; Fourth official: Kristoffer Karlsson

13 September 2025 23	Degerfors IF	0–1	Mjällby AIF	Degerfors
15:00 CEST (UTC+2)	Sundgren (yellow card) 72'	Report	Pettersson (yellow card) 13'; Stavitski (yellow card) 71'; Aksum (yellow card) 89' (red card) 89' (not on pitch)	Stadium: Stora Valla; Attendance: 5,395; Referee: Glenn Nyberg; Assistant referees: Mahbod Beigi, Andreas Söderkvist; Fourth official: Fredrik Alknäs

20 September 2025 24	Mjällby AIF	1–1	Östers IF	Hällevik
17:30 CEST (UTC+2)	Norén 31'; Stroud (penalty missed) 79'	Report	Christensen (yellow card) 38', (goal) 82'	Stadium: Strandvallen; Attendance: 5,775; Referee: Mohammed Al-Hakim; Assistant referees: Niklas Nyberg, Alexander Milovanovic; Fourth official: Stjepan Dodik

28 September 2025 25	IF Brommapojkarna	0–1	Mjällby AIF	Stockholm
14:00 CEST (UTC+2)	Camara (yellow card) 45+2'; A. Isaksson (yellow card) 90+4' (not on pitch)	Report	Charles (red card) 53'; Gustavsson (yellow card) 64'; H. Johansson 74'	Stadium: Grimsta IP; Attendance: 1,696; Referee: Erik Mattsson; Assistant referees: Fredrik Klyver, Anton Sjöberg; Fourth official: Marcus Holmberg

4 October 2025 26	Mjällby AIF	2–0	IF Elfsborg	Hällevik
15:00 CEST (UTC+2)	Gustafson (yellow card) 34'; Bergström 39'; Pettersson 59'	Report	Ihler (yellow card) 90+1'; Wikström (yellow card) 90+3'	Stadium: Strandvallen; Attendance: 4,933; Referee: Oscar Johnson; Assistant referees: Mikael Hallin, Simon Kristensson; Fourth official: Adi Aganovic

20 October 2025 27	IFK Göteborg	0–2	Mjällby AIF	Gothenburg
19:10 CEST (UTC+2)	Svensson (yellow card) 35'	Report	H. Johansson (yellow card) 17'; Bergström 20'; Pettersson 57'	Stadium: Gamla Ullevi; Attendance: 16,937; Referee: Kristoffer Karlsson; Assistant referees: Fredrik Klyver, Simon Kristensson; Fourth official: Joakim Sars

26 October 2025 28	Mjällby AIF	2–1	IFK Norrköping	Hällevik
14:00 CEST (UTC+2)	Gustavsson (yellow card) 30'; Pettersson 55'; Bergström 67'	Report	Nyman 28'; Prica (yellow card) 42'; Watson (yellow card) 90+3'	Stadium: Strandvallen; Attendance: 5,629; Referee: Richard Sundell; Assistant referees: Per Rehnlund, Niclas Hummelgren; Fourth official: Mohamed Rachid

3 November 2025 29	IFK Värnamo	0–5	Mjällby AIF	Värnamo
19:00 CET (UTC+1)	Coulibaly (yellow card) 28' (yellow-red card) 49'	Report	Stroud 11', 18', 50'; Tidstrand (yellow card) 15'; Gustafson 69'; A. Johansson 82'	Stadium: Finnvedsvallen; Attendance: 1,592; Referee: Adi Aganovic; Assistant referees: Almira Spahic, Mirza Rovcanin; Fourth official: Arianit Abazi

9 November 2025 30	Mjällby AIF	1–0	BK Häcken	Hällevik
15:00 CET (UTC+1)	A. Johansson 81'	Report	Andersen (yellow card) 49'; Öhman (yellow card) 65'; Lindberg (yellow card) 79'	Stadium: Strandvallen; Attendance: 5,403; Referee: Fredrik Klitte; Assistant referees: Andreas Svensson, Robert Nyberg; Fourth official: Rinon Hasani

=== 2024–25 Svenska Cupen ===
The competition continued from the 2024 season.

==== Group stage ====
Pos	Team	Pld	W	D	L	GF	GA	GD	Pts	Qualification	MAIF	HBK	LAN	GEF
1	Mjällby AIF	3	3	0	0	12	0	+12	9	Advance to Knockout stage		3–0	4–0	
2	Halmstads BK	3	2	0	1	6	3	+3	6				2–0	4–0
3	Landskrona BoIS	3	1	0	2	3	7	−4	3					3–1
4	Gefle IF	3	0	0	3	1	12	−11	0		0–5			

Source: SvFF
Rules for classification: 1) Points; 2) Goal difference; 3) Goals scored; 4) Head-to-head record; 5) Lowest disciplinary points; 6) Highest ranked team

16 February 2025 1	Mjällby AIF	4–0	Landskrona BoIS	Hällevik
13:00 CET (UTC+1)	Gustafson (yellow card) 30'; H. Johansson 59'; Stavitski 68'; Røjkjær 75'; M. Isaksson 90'	Report	Capotondi (yellow card) 22'; Murbeck (yellow card) 34'	Stadium: Strandvallen; Referee: Adi Aganovic; Assistant referees: Mirza Rovcanin, Jesper Arnshed; Fourth official: Fidan Hasani

23 February 2025 2	Gefle IF	0–5	Mjällby AIF	Gävle
13:00 CET (UTC+1)		Report	Stroud 35'; Manneh 39'; A. Johansson 61', 84'; M. Isaksson 90+4'	Stadium: Gavlevallen; Attendance: 308; Referee: Glenn Nyberg; Assistant referees: Mahbod Beigi, Andreas Söderkvist; Fourth official: Christoffer Lindberg

2 March 2025 3	Mjällby AIF	3–0	Halmstads BK	Hällevik
13:00 CET (UTC+1)	Manneh 59'; Kiilerich 76'; Gustavsson (yellow card) 80'; Pettersson 89'	Report	Nilsson (yellow card) 10'; Agnero (yellow card) 13'; Chrupałła (yellow card) 27'	Stadium: Strandvallen; Referee: Kristoffer Karlsson; Assistant referees: Marcus Klitte, Ajdin Mlivic; Fourth official: Hassan Al-Saqr

==== Knockout phase ====
8 March 2025 Quarter-finals	Mjällby AIF	0–1	BK Häcken	Hällevik
16:00 CET (UTC+1)	Norén (yellow card) 8'; Bergström (yellow card) 54'; Pettersson (yellow card) 90+7'	Report	Hammar (yellow card) 44'; Lode (yellow card) 56'; Faye (yellow card) 58', (goal) 90+4'	Stadium: Strandvallen; Attendance: 1,908; Referee: Victor Wolf; Assistant referees: Mikael Hallin, Per Rehnlund; Fourth official: Oscar Johnson

=== 2025–26 Svenska Cupen ===
20 August 2025 Round 2	Onsala BK	1–2	Mjällby AIF	Onsala
17:30 CEST (UTC+2)	Nygaard 38'; Parker (yellow card) 45+1'	Report	Małachowski 42'; Gustavsson (yellow card) 73'; Stroud 90+3'	Stadium: Rydets IP; Attendance: 875; Referee: Magnus Lindgren; Assistant referees: Emre Akan, Isaac Armel Yamuremye

Group stage took place during the 2026 season.
