= 2026 Mjällby AIF season =

Swedish football club season

Mjällby AIF
2026 season
- Chairman: Magnus Emeus
- Head coach: Karl Marius Aksum (until 8 September 2026); Andreas Brännström (from 8 September 2026)
- All statistics correct as of 9 November 2025.

The 2026 season is Mjällby AIF's season as defending champions. In addition to the Allsvenskan, they competed in the 2025–26 and the 2026–27 editions of the Svenska Cupen, as well as the 2026–27 UEFA Champions League and the 2026–27 UEFA Conference League.

== Season summary ==
On 20 October 2025, Mjällby AIF secured its first ever Swedish Championship title. This qualified them for the 2026–27 UEFA Champions League second qualifying round.

After the title-winning season, Anders Torstensson was appointed technical director of the club.

On 14 May 2026, Mjällby AIF won the 2025-26 Svenska Cupen.

On 8 September 2026, it was announced that Karl Marius Aksum had been relieved of his duties. The same day, Andreas Brännström was announced as manager.

== First-team squad ==
As of 6 March 2026

Note: Flags indicate national team as defined under FIFA eligibility rules; some limited exceptions apply. Players may hold more than one non-FIFA nationality.

No.	Pos.	Nation	Player
1	GK	SWE	Amar Dževlan
2	DF	SWE	Ludvig Svanberg
3	DF	CMR	Christian Tchouante
4	DF	SWE	Axel Norén
5	DF	PAK	Abdullah Iqbal
6	MF	SWE	Ludwig Malachowski Thorell
7	MF	SWE	Viktor Gustafson
8	MF	SWE	Teo Helge
10	MF	DEN	Jeppe Kjær
11	FW	FIN	Timo Stavitski
13	GK	SWE	Robin Wallinder
14	MF	SWE	Villiam Granath
15	FW	NOR	Bork Bang-Kittilsen
17	MF	SWE	Elliot Stroud
18	FW	SWE	Jacob Bergström
19	FW	GAM	Abdoulie Manneh

No.	Pos.	Nation	Player
20	MF	SWE	Måns Isaksson
21	FW	NGR	Ibrahim Adewale
22	MF	SWE	Jesper Gustavsson (captain)
23	FW	FRO	Áki Samuelsen
24	DF	SWE	Tom Pettersson
25	MF	DEN	Max Nielsen
27	MF	SWE	Ludvig Tidstrand
28	DF	SWE	Tim Malmström
29	MF	SWE	Olle Lindberg
30	GK	SWE	Hugo Fagerberg
31	FW	SWE	Zebedee Kennedy
32	FW	SWE	Olle Nilsson Lööv
33	DF	FIN	Tony Miettinen
35	GK	SWE	Alexander Lundin
39	MF	SWE	Romeo Leandersson

== Transfers ==
=== Transfers in ===
Date from	Position	Nationality	Name	From	Fee	Ref.
2 November 2025	FW	(Nigeria)	Ibrahim Adewale	(Nigeria) Tripple 44	Transfer	
28 December 2025	FW	(Faroe Islands)	Áki Samuelsen	(Norway) Ranheim Fotball	Transfer	
8 January 2026	MF	(Sweden)	Villiam Granath	(Sweden) Halmstads BK	Transfer	
10 July 2026	MF	(Faroe Islands)	Martin Agnarsson	(Denmark) Aarhus Fremad	€350,000	
17 July 2026	MF	(United States)	Ian Hoffmann	(Poland) Lech Poznań	Loan until 2027	

=== Transfers out ===
Date from	Position	Nationality	Name	To	Fee	Ref.
7 February 2026	MF	(Uganda)	Calvin Kabuye	(Finland) KuPS		
7 July 2026	MF	(Sweden)	Ludwig Małachowski Thorell	(Switzerland) FC Basel	Transfer	
10 July 2026	MF	(Nigeria)	Ibrahim Adewale	(Sweden) Norrby IF	Loan	
20 July 2026	DF	(Cameroon)	Christian Tchouante	(Serbia) FK Železničar Pančevo	Loan	
18 August 2026	MF	(The Gambia)	Abdoulie Manneh	(Belgium) Cercle Brugge	Loan	

== Competitions ==
=== Allsvenskan ===
==== League table ====
Pos	Team	Pld	W	D	L	GF	GA	GD	Pts	Qualification or relegation
10	IFK Göteborg	28	10	9	9	36	46	−10	39	
11	IF Brommapojkarna	28	9	8	11	39	44	−5	35	
12	Mjällby AIF	29	6	11	12	31	44	−13	29	
13	Kalmar FF	28	7	5	16	24	42	−18	26	
14	Degerfors IF (Y)	29	5	6	18	23	48	−25	21	Qualification for the Allsvenskan play-off

Updated to match(es) played on 22 November 2026. Source: svenskfotboll.se (in Swedish)
Rules for classification: 1) Points; 2) Goal difference; 3) Goals scored; 4) Head-to-head points; 5) Head-to-head goal difference; 6) Head-to-head away goals scored; 7) Play-off
(Note: Play-off is only played if need to decide champion, teams for relegation or UEFA competition and will be played on a neutral ground).
(Y) Can at best reach Allsvenskan play-off

==== Matches ====
4 April 2026 1	Hammarby	3–0	Mjällby AIF	3Arena
	Abraham 42', 44', 48'	Report		Attendance: 30,162; Referee: Kristoffer Karlsson

11 April 2026 2	Mjällby AIF	0–2	Örgryte IS	Strandvallen
		Report	Andreasson 21'; Ugwo 26'	Attendance: 3,884; Referee: Adi Aganović

18 April 2026 3	Mjällby AIF	3–0	IF Brommapojkarna	Strandvallen
	Thorell 5'; Bergström 28'; Manneh 32'	Report		Attendance: 3,512; Referee: Adam Ladebäck

23 April 2026 4	GAIS	0–0	Mjällby AIF	Gamla Ullevi
		Report		Attendance: 8,011; Referee: Oscar Johnson

27 April 2026 5	Mjällby AIF	2–0	Halmstads BK	Strandvallen
	Bergström 56'; Granath 84'	Report		Attendance: 3,573; Referee: Richard Sundell

3 May 2026 6	Malmö FF	2–3	Mjällby AIF	Stadion, Malmö
	Ali 57'; Hakšabanović 81'	Report	Bergström 2', 70'; Stroud 49'	Attendance: 19,905; Referee: Mohammed Al Hakim

9 May 2026 7	Degerfors IF	1–4	Mjällby AIF	Stora Valla
	]: Moro 51'	Report	Kjær 4'; Pettersson 30'; Manneh 37'; Stroud 84'	Attendance: 3,636; Referee: Fredrik Klitte

17 May 2026 8	Mjällby AIF	0–1	BK Häcken	Strandvallen
	Norén (red card) 45+1'	Report	Lindberg 75'

21 May 2025 9	IF Elfsborg	1–1	Mjällby AIF	Borås Arena
	Östman 7'	Report	Kjær 49'

25 May 2025 10	IFK Göteborg	1–1	Mjällby AIF	Gamla Ullevi
	Clemmensen 51'	Report	Bergström 58' (pen.)	Attendance: 16,653; Referee: Oscar Johnson

3 July 2026 11	IK Sirius	4–4	Mjällby AIF	Studenternas IP
	Ure 14', 46', 50', 69'	Report	Gustavsson (yellow card) 49'; Samuelsen 56', 65'; Svanberg 81'; Pettersson 90+1'	Attendance: 9,349; Referee: Adam Ladebäck

11 July 2026 12	Mjällby AIF	1–2	AIK	Strandvallen
	Youssef 90+2'	Report	Andersson 74'; Helm 90'	Attendance: 5,875; Referee: Mohammed Al Hakim

17 July 2026 13	Mjällby AIF	0–0	Västerås	Strandvallen
		Report		Attendance: 5,188; Referee: Richard Sundell

25 July 2026 14	Kalmar FF	2–1	Mjällby AIF	Guldfågeln Arena
	Keita 17'; Sagoe Jr 69'	Report	Stroud 3'

8 August 2026 15	Mjällby AIF	0–1	IF Elfsborg	Strandvallen
		Report	Olsson 22'	Attendance: 5,018; Referee: Granit Maqedonci

15 August 2026 16	Mjällby AIF	4–3	IK Sirius	Strandvallen
	Lindberg 46', 87'; Bergström 54', 77'	Report	Liimatta 6', 24'; Bjerkebo 34'	Attendance: 4,478; Referee: Adam Ladebäck

31 August 2026 17	Djurgårdens IF Fotboll	4–0	Mjällby AIF	3Arena
	Lien 5', 14'; Åslund 26'; Fallenius 87'	Report		Attendance: 17,575; Referee: Erik Mattsson

3 September 2026 19	Mjällby AIF	1–3	IFK Göteborg	Strandvallen
	Lindberg 83'	Report	Žugelj 59'; Simmelhack 63'; Larsson 75', 79'	Attendance: 4,143; Referee: Joakim Sars

11 September 2026 20	BK Häcken	1–1	Mjällby AIF	Nordic Wellness Arena
	Lindberg 56'	Report	Bergström 17'	Attendance: 3,226; Referee: Oscar Johnson

16 September 2026	AIK	1–1	Mjällby AIF	Nationalarenan
	Kouame 40'	Report		Attendance: 20,151; Referee: Glenn Nyberg

20 September 2026 21	Mjällby AIF	0–3	GAIS	Strandvallen
		Report	Fagerjord 13'; Vasić 54', 59'	Attendance: 4,634; Referee: Fredrik Klitte

10 October 2026 22	Mjällby AIF	1–1	Degerfors IF	Strandvallen
	Kjær 56'	Report	Taranis 52'	Attendance: 3,374; Referee: Adam Ladebäck

18 October 2026 23	Västerås SK Fotboll	1–0	Mjällby AIF	Hitachi Energy Arena
	Axel Taonsa 20'	Report		Referee: Fredrik Klitte

25 October 2026 24	Mjällby AIF	0–2	Hammarby Fotboll	Strandvallen
		Report	Madjed 68'; Johansson Schellhas 89'	Referee: Victor Wolf

29 October 2026 25	Örgryte IS	1–2	Mjällby AIF	Gamla Ullevi
	Dyrestam 18'	Report	Bergström 5'; Miettinen 49'	Attendance: 6,274; Referee: Mohammed Al Hakim

2 November 2026 26	Mjällby AIF	0–0	Kalmar FF	Strandvallen
	Kjær (yellow card) 20'; Iqbal (yellow card) 26'; Miettinen (yellow card) 79'	Report		Attendance: 3,579; Referee: Richard Sundell

8 November 2026 27	IF Brommapojkarna	0–0	Mjällby AIF	Grimsta IP
	Berg (yellow card) 73'	Report	Leandersson (yellow card) 69'	Referee: Glenn Nyberg

22 November 2026 28	Mjällby AIF	1–1	Malmö FF	Strandvallen
	Granath 31'	Report	Lahdo 63'	Attendance: 5,329; Referee: Joakim Sars

29 November 2026 29	Halmstads BK	v	Mjällby AIF
		Report

=== Svenska Cupen ===
Pos	Team	Pld	W	D	L	GF	GA	GD	Pts	Qualification	MAIF	KFF	ÖIS	IFKV
1	Mjällby AIF	3	3	0	0	7	1	+6	9	Advance to Knockout stage		2–0		2–1
2	Kalmar FF	3	1	1	1	4	5	−1	4				2–2	
3	Örgryte IS	3	0	2	1	4	7	−3	2		0–2			
4	IFK Värnamo	3	0	1	2	4	6	−2	1			1–2	2–2	

Source: SvFF
Rules for classification: 1) Points; 2) Goal difference; 3) Goals scored; 4) Head-to-head record; 5) Lowest disciplinary points; 6) Highest ranked team

14 March 2026 Quarter-final	Mjällby AIF	4–0	Malmö FF	Hällevik
15:00 UTC+1	Stroud 17'; Bergström 27', 59'; Granath 63'	Report		Stadium: Strandvallen; Attendance: 3,978; Referee: Granit Maqedonci

22 March 2026 Semi-final	Mjällby AIF	3–0	GAIS	Hällevik
16:00 UTC+1	Pettersson 31'; Stroud 45+1'; Bergström 55'	Report		Stadium: Strandvallen; Attendance: 4,107; Referee: Victor Wolf

14 May 2026 Final	Mjällby AIF	2–1	Hammarby IF	Solna
15:30 UTC+2	Stroud 19'; Bergström 45'	Report	Abraham 22'	Stadium: Nationalarenan; Attendance: 39,903; Referee: Granit Maqedonci

=== UEFA Champions League ===
21 July 2026	Mjällby AIF (Sweden)	3–0	(Gibraltar) Lincoln Red Imps	Strandvallen, Hällevik
18:00	Samuelsen 18', 24'; Bergström 32'	Report		Attendance: 3,523; Referee: Matthew De Gabriele (Malta)

28 July 2026	Lincoln Red Imps (Gibraltar)	0–0	(Sweden) Mjällby AIF	Europa Point Stadium, Gibraltar
18:00		Report		Attendance: 774; Referee: Alexandros Tsakalidis (Greece)

4 August 2026	Mjällby AIF (Sweden)	1–2	(Slovakia) Slovan Bratislava	Strandvallen, Hällevik
18:00	Stroud 61' (pen.)	Report	Camara 78'; Kianga 90+4'	Attendance: 3,327; Referee: Nick Walsh (Scotland)

11 August 2026	Slovan Bratislava (Slovakia)	2–0	(Sweden) Mjällby AIF	Tehelné pole, Bratislava
20:15	Camara 47'; Yirajang 78'	Report		Attendance: 21,350; Referee: Michael Oliver (England)

=== UEFA Europa League ===
20 August 2026	Mjällby AIF (Sweden)	0–1	(Austria) Red Bull Salzburg	Strandvallen, Hällevik
18:00		Report	Pettersson 90+2' (o.g.)	Attendance: 3,079; Referee: Mykola Balakin (Ukraine)

27 August 2026	Red Bull Salzburg (Austria)	3–0	(Sweden) Mjällby AIF	Red Bull Arena, Salzburg
19:00	Konaté 61', 68'; Tabaković 80'	Report		Attendance: 7,654; Referee: Irfan Peljto (Bosnia and Herzegovina)

=== UEFA Conference League ===
15 October 2026	Mjällby AIF (Sweden)	2–0	(Andorra) Inter Club d'Escaldes	Olympia, Helsingborg (Note: Mjällby AIF will play their home matches at Olympia, Helsingborg, instead of their regular stadium, Strandvallen, Hällevik, which does not meet UEFA requirements.)
18:45	Bergström 54'; Norén 65'	Report		Attendance: 2,691; Referee: Menelaos Antoniou (Cyprus)

22 October 2026	Iberia 1999 (Georgia (country))	1–1	(Sweden) Mjällby AIF	Mikheil Meskhi Stadium, Tbilisi
18:45 (20:45 UTC+4)	Brune (yellow card) 10'; Dadiani (yellow card) 45', (yellow card) 60'; Jinjolava 55' (pen.); Kobuladze (yellow card) 79'; Kardava (yellow card) 90+3'	Report	Gustafson (yellow card) 45+1'; Gustavsson (yellow card) 62'; Pettersson 89'; Nielsen (yellow card) 90+1'	Referee: Lothar D'Hondt (Belgium)

5 November 2026	Mjällby AIF (Sweden)	2−0	(Bosnia and Herzegovina) Borac Banja Luka	Olympia, Helsingborg
18:45	Bergström 54'; Enggård 88'	Report		Attendance: 3,229; Referee: Gal Laibuvitz (Israel)

26 November 2026	Kairat (Kazakhstan)	v	(Sweden) Mjällby AIF	Central Stadium, Almaty
16:30 (20:30 UTC+5)		Report

10 December 2026	Mjällby AIF (Sweden)	v	(Cyprus) Pafos	Olympia, Helsingborg
21:00		Report

17 December 2026	Atalanta (Italy)	v	(Sweden) Mjällby AIF	Stadio di Bergamo, Bergamo
21:00		Report
