= Bleon Kurtulus =

Swedish footballer (born 2007)

Personal information
- Date of birth: 24 June 2007 (age 19)
- Place of birth: Halmstad, Sweden
- Height: 1.85 m (6 ft 1 in)
- Position: Centre-back

Team information
- Current team: Malmö FF
- Number: 4

Youth career
- 2016–2023: Halmstads BK

Senior career*
Years	Team	Apps	(Gls)
2024–2025	Halmstads BK	36	(1)
2026–	Malmö FF	17	(1)

International career^{‡}
2022–2024	Sweden U17	22	(0)
2024–2025	Sweden U19	6	(0)
2025–2026	Sweden U21	9	(0)
2026–	Kosovo	1	(0)
- * Club domestic league appearances and goals as of 19 September 2026 ‡ National team caps and goals as of 18 November 2026

Bleon Kurtulus (Albanian: Kurtulush, Turkish: Kurtuluş; born 24 June 2007) is a professional footballer who plays as a defender for Allsvenskan club Malmö FF. Born in Sweden, he represented that nation at youth international level before switching to represent Kosovo at senior international level.

== Club career ==
=== Halmstads BK ===
Kurtulus joined his hometown club Halmstads BK's youth academy in 2016 and progressed through its ranks over the following seven years, representing the under-19 team before joining the senior squad in 2023. His older brother, Edvin, had also developed at the club before moving to Hammarby IF.

In June 2023, aged 15, Kurtulus signed a three-year professional contract with Halmstads BK, with plans to join the first-team squad in January 2024.

Kurtulus made his professional debut on 25 April 2024, coming on as a substitute in a 2–1 home victory against Hammarby in the 2024 Allsvenskan. The match also marked the first senior competitive meeting between Kurtulus and his older brother Edvin, who was playing for Hammarby.

During the 2024 season, he made eight league appearances and also featured in the Svenska Cupen. On 15 October 2024, he was included in The Guardian's Next Generation 2024 list, featuring 60 young footballers born in 2007.

In the 2025 season, Kurtulus made 28 league appearances and scored one goal. He was nominated for Young Player of the Year at the 2025 Allsvenskans Stora Pris, alongside Ludwig Malachowski Thorell of Mjällby AIF and Noah Tolf of IFK Göteborg.

=== Malmö FF ===
On 3 February 2026, Kurtulus joined fellow Allsvenskan club Malmö FF from Halmstads BK, signing a five-year contract. He had made 36 league appearances for Halmstads BK before the transfer and was assigned shirt number 4 at Malmö. Halmstads BK also confirmed the transfer, with the club's chief executive, Jesper Westerberg, stating that the agreement included a sell-on clause for the club.

Kurtulus made his debut for Malmö FF on 8 March 2026, coming on as a 64th-minute substitute for Theodor Lundbergh in a 2–1 win over his former club Halmstads BK in the group stage of the 2025–26 Svenska Cupen at Eleda Stadion.

== International career ==
=== Sweden ===
Kurtulus represented Sweden at under-17, under-19 and under-21 levels, serving as captain of the U17 side. Between 2022 and 2024, he made 22 appearances for the Sweden U17 and was included in the squad for the 2024 UEFA European Under-17 Championship in Cyprus. He subsequently made six appearances for the U19 between 2024 and 2025 before progressing to the U21, for which he recorded nine appearances from 2025 to 2026.

During his time with the U21 side, Kurtulus featured in the European Under-21 Championship qualifying campaign, forming part of the team's defence alongside fellow Malmö FF player Nils Zätterström. His final appearance for Sweden U21 came against Finland U21 on 4 June 2026, bringing his total youth international appearances for Sweden to 37.

=== Kosovo ===
On 6 November 2026, Kurtulus received a call-up from the Kosovo senior national team for the 2026–27 UEFA Nations League matches against Israel and the Republic of Ireland. His call-up came more than four years after his older brother, Edvin, who had previously represented Kosovo at under-21 level, declined a call-up to the senior team in May 2022 and opted to represent Sweden instead. His debut with Kosovo came eleven days later in the UEFA Nations League match against the Republic of Ireland after coming on as a substitute at last minutes in place of Mërgim Vojvoda.

== Personal life ==
Kurtulus was born in Halmstad, Sweden to a family with roots in Prizren. His grandparents had emigrated from Kosovo to Turkey as muhaxhir, where they adopted the surname Kurtuluş (meaning "liberation" in Turkish) under the Turkish Surname Law. In the 1960s, his family migrated to Sweden, where Kurtulus' father was born.

Kurtulus has two brothers who are also footballers. His older brother, Edvin, is a Swedish international defender who has played for Halmstads BK, Hammarby IF and Bulgarian club Ludogorets Razgrad, while his other brother, Egon, has played for Hammarby Talang, BK Astrio and Eskilsminne IF in the Ettan.

In January 2024, Kurtulus spoke about his decision to remain at Halmstads BK, citing his family, friends and education in Halmstad as among the reasons for staying at the club. He also discussed the support he received from his older brother Edvin, who regularly offered him advice before matches, and from Halmstad defender Andreas Johansson, whom he described as a father figure in football.

== Career statistics ==
=== Club ===
As of 19 September 2026

Appearances and goals by club, season and competition
Club	Season	League			Cup		Other		Total	
Club	Season	Division	Apps	Goals	Apps	Goals	Apps	Goals	Apps	Goals
Halmstad	2024	Allsvenskan	8	0	1 (Note: Appearances in the Svenska Cupen)	0	0	0	9	0
Halmstad	2025	Allsvenskan	28	1	3	0	—		31	1
Halmstad	Total		36	1	4	0	—		40	1
Malmö FF	2026	Allsvenskan	13	1	3	1	—		16	2
Career total			49	2	7	1	0	0	56	3

=== International ===
As of match played 17 November 2026

Appearances and goals by national team and year
National team	Year	Apps	Goals
Kosovo	2026	1	0
Total		1	0
