= Abdullah Iqbal =

Pakistani footballer (born 2002)

Personal information
- Date of birth: 27 July 2002 (age 24)
- Place of birth: Copenhagen, Denmark
- Height: 1.92 m (6 ft 4 in)
- Position: Defender

Team information
- Current team: Mjällby
- Number: 5

Youth career
- 2009–2016: B.93
- 2016: Brøndby
- 2017–2021: B.93

Senior career*
Years	Team	Apps	(Gls)
2021–2024	B.93	91	(1)
2024–	Mjällby	44	(0)

International career^{‡}
2023–	Pakistan U23	2	(0)
2022–	Pakistan	24	(0)
- * Club domestic league appearances and goals as of 15:00, 3 July 2026 (UTC) ‡ National team caps and goals as of 23:00, 2 October 2026 (UTC)

Abdullah Iqbal (Urdu: عبداللہ اقبال; born 27 July 2002) is a professional footballer who plays as a centre-back for Allsvenskan club Mjällby. Born in Denmark, he captains the Pakistan national team. Iqbal has been praised for his defensive abilities and leadership, and is regarded as one of the best Pakistani centre-backs.

== Early life ==
Iqbal was born in Copenhagen, Denmark and is of Pakistani descent, with his family originating from the city of Kharian, Punjab.

== Club career ==
=== Boldklubben af 1893 ===
==== Youth career ====
Iqbal joined the youth academy of B.93 at the age of seven. He remained at the club until age fourteen before joining Brøndby IF for one year. Following his stint with the Superliga team, he returned to B.93 and eventually captained the under-19 side. Iqbal initially played as an attacking midfielder, but was unexpectedly assigned as central defender for the first time during a match with the under-19 youth team under head coach Thomas Norgaard, after the team's central defender was injured, and another player was sent off.

==== 2021–2023 ====
He was promoted to the first team in 2021 and debuted in a 2–1 victory over Brabrand IF. Iqbal was then part of the squad that nearly earned promotion to the 1st Division in 2022 before ultimately falling short. In the next season, he scored the opener in the 2–1 away victory against Esbjerg, which achieved the promotion to the 1st Division.

==== 2023–24 season ====
In the 2023–24 Danish 1st Division, Iqbal was a key player for the team, playing most games in central defence, and few as left back. In the initial league round he played 17 games out of 21 games for the club amidst his international duty. In the relegation round, he helped the club avoid the relegation. On 1 June 2024, he was named player of the year for the club, after the last match of the season against Hillerød.

=== Mjällby ===
"Abdullah is a player that we have had our eye on for a longer period and that we identified would clearly fit into our way of working on and off the pitch. He is a very strong, physical and fast centre-back with a very fine left foot. I would like to warmly welcome Abdullah to Mjällby AIF."

— Mjällby sporting director Hans Larsson.

On 8 August 2024, Swedish top-tier Allsvenskan club Mjällby signed Iqbal for an amount of €200,000 until the 2028 season. He arrived as replacement for centre-back Colin Rösler, who had departed to Malmö. His first months were interrupted by a back injury.

In the 2025 season, Iqbal became a crucial figure in Mjällby's defense, helping the team clinch its first-ever Allsvenskan title.

== International career ==
Iqbal received his first senior international call-up for a friendly against Nepal on 16 November 2022. He went on to make his debut in the eventual 0–1 defeat. In June he represented Pakistan in Mauritius Four Nation Cup and then in the 2023 SAFF Championship. In October 2023 he represented Pakistan U23 in the AFC U23 Asian Cup Qualifiers.

In June 2024, Iqbal captained the senior team for the first time in the second round of the 2026 FIFA World Cup qualification against Saudi Arabia and Tajikistan.

== Style of play ==
Iqbal is known for his composure on the ball, aerial dominance, game vision, and leadership from defence. With a height of 1.92 metres, he has been praised for his physical strength with technical assurance, often initiating attacks through accurate passing from deep positions. Coaches have described him as a modern ball-playing centre-back, comfortable stepping forward to carry possession and link play. While primarily a central defender, his vision and mobility have occasionally led to comparisons with defensive midfielders for his capacity to transition play and control tempo.

== Career statistics ==
=== Club ===
As of match played 5 November 2026

Club	Season	League			National cup		Continental		Other		Total	
Club	Season	Division	Apps	Goals	Apps	Goals	Apps	Goals	Apps	Goals	Apps	Goals
Boldklubben af 1893	2023–24	Danish 1st Division	29	0	—		—		—		29	0
Boldklubben af 1893	2024–25	Danish 1st Division	2	0	—		—		—		2	0
Boldklubben af 1893	Total		31	0	—		—		—		31	0
Mjällby	2024	Allsvenskan	3	0	2	0	—		—		5	0
Mjällby	2025	Allsvenskan	24	0	1	0	—		—		25	0
Mjällby	2026	Allsvenskan	25	0	4	0	3	0	—		32	0
Mjällby	Total		52	0	7	0	3	0	—		62	0
Career total			83	0	7	0	3	0	—		93	0

=== International ===
As of 14 November 2026

Appearances and goals by national team and year
National team	Year	Apps	Goals
Pakistan	2022	1	0
Pakistan	2023	10	0
Pakistan	2024	3	0
Pakistan	2025	5	0
Pakistan	2026	7	0
Total		25	0

== Honours ==
Mjällby

- Allsvenskan: 2025
- Svenska Cupen: 2025–26

Pakistan

- Diamond Jubilee International Football Tournament: 2026
- SAFF Championship:
  - Runners Up:2026

== See also ==
- List of Pakistan international footballers born outside Pakistan
- List of Pakistan national football team captains
