= Anders Torstenson =

Anders Torstenson may refer to:

- Anders Torstenson (politician) (1641–1686), Swedish statesman
- Anders Torstensson (football manager) (born 1966), Swedish football manager
