= Kiilerich =

Kiilerich is a Danish surname. Notable people with the surname include:

- Bente Kiilerich (born 1954), Danish-born Norwegian scholar of art history
- Karsten Kiilerich (born 1955), Danish film and television director, screenwriter, and animator
- Kasper Kiilerich (born 2005), Danish footballer
- Jakob Kiilerich (born 2000), Danish footballer
- Malte Kiilerich (born 1995), Danish footballer
- Reno Kiilerich (born 1976), Danish heavy metal drummer
- Sune Kiilerich (born 1990), Danish footballer
