= Romeo Leandersson =

Swedish association football player

Personal information
- Full name: Romeo Carl Wiking Arrhenius Leandersson
- Date of birth: 23 July 2008 (age 18)
- Place of birth: Hällevik, Sweden
- Height: 1.75 m (5 ft 9 in)
- Position: Midfielder

Team information
- Current team: Mjällby AIF
- Number: 39

Youth career
- 2013–2024: Mjällby AIF

Senior career*
Years	Team	Apps	(Gls)
2025–	Mjällby AIF	28	(0)

International career^{‡}
2025	Sweden U17	4	(0)
2025	Sweden U18	5	(0)
2026–	Sweden U19	3	(0)
- * Club domestic league appearances and goals as of 8 July 2026 ‡ National team caps and goals as of 6 April 2023

Romeo Carl Wiking Arrhenius Leandersson (born 23 July 2008) is a Swedish professional footballer who plays as a midfielder for Allsvenskan club Mjällby AIF.

== Club career ==
After progressing through boyhood club Mjällby AIF's academy, Leandersson was promoted to the senior team ahead of the 2025 season. He made his professional debut on 12 April 2025, becoming the second youngest Mjällby AIF debutant ever, second only to Olle Nilsson Lööv who made his debut in the same game. On 22 May 2025, Leandersson started his first Allsvenskan game away vs. Hammarby IF. Mjällby AIF won the game 2–1 and he was awarded Player of the Match.

== International career ==
Leandersson is a youth international for Sweden.

== Personal life ==
Leandersson is the son of former Mjällby AIF player William Leandersson.

== Honours ==
Mjällby

- Svenska Cupen: 2025–26
