= Alexander Johansson (footballer, born 1995) =

Swedish footballer (born 1995)

Personal information
- Full name: Eric Alexander Johansson
- Date of birth: 30 October 1995 (age 30)
- Height: 1.89 m (6 ft 2 in)
- Position: Forward

Team information
- Current team: Marko
- Number: 16

Youth career
- Arvidstorps IK

Senior career*
Years	Team	Apps	(Gls)
2014–2015	Vinbergs IF	34	(4)
2016	Stafsinge IF	21	(6)
2017	Ullareds IK	25	(12)
2018–2019	Tvååkers IF	56	(16)
2020–2022	Varbergs BoIS	57	(11)
2020	→ Sandnes Ulf (loan)	8	(0)
2021	→ IK Brage (loan)	11	(2)
2023–26	Mjällby AIF	78	(9)
2026–	Marko	5	(1)
- * Club domestic league appearances and goals as of 20 March 2026

Eric Alexander Johansson (born 30 October 1995) is a Swedish professional footballer who plays as a forward for Super League Greece 2 club Marko. He previously played for Mjällby AIF.

== Honours ==
Mjällby IF

- Allsvenskan: 2025
