= Christian Tchouante =

Cameroonian footballer (born 2006)

Personal information
- Full name: Christian Tchouante Tchouante
- Date of birth: 17 January 2006 (age 20)
- Position: Defender

Team information
- Current team: Železničar Pančevo (on loan from Mjällby)
- Number: 3

Youth career
- Kadji Sports Academy
- 2024: LA Galaxy

Senior career*
| Years | Team | Apps | (Gls) |
| 2024 | Ventura County FC | 9 | (0) |
| 2025–2026 | Mjällby AIF | 7 | (0) |
| 2026– | → Železničar Pančevo (loan) | 2 | (0) |
- * Club domestic league appearances and goals as of 9 August 2026

Christian Tchouante Tchouante (born 17 January 2006) is a Cameroonian professional footballer who plays for Serbian SuperLiga club Železničar Pančevo on loan from Allsvenskan club Mjällby, as a defender.

== Career ==
After playing for the Kadji Sports Academy, Tchouante signed with American team LA Galaxy. He spent the 2024 season with Galaxy's reserve team Ventura County FC.

In May 2025 he signed for Swedish club Mjällby AIF. He made his debut in August 2025.

In July 2026 he signed on loan for Serbian SuperLiga club Železničar Pančevo.

== Honours ==
Mjällby IF

- Allsvenskan: 2025
- Svenska Cupen: 2025–26
