= Lukas Bergquist =

Swedish footballer (born 2000)

Personal information
- Date of birth: 28 June 2000 (age 26)
- Place of birth: Söderhamn, Sweden
- Height: 1.80 m (5 ft 11 in)
- Position: Left-back

Team information
- Current team: AIK
- Number: 5

Youth career
- –2016: Söderhamns FF

Senior career*
Years	Team	Apps	(Gls)
2017–2018	Söderhamns FF	28	(1)
2019–2021	Hudiksvalls FF	58	(0)
2022–2023	Umeå FC	43	(1)
2023–2025	Östers IF	60	(3)
2026–	AIK	12	(0)
- * Club domestic league appearances and goals as of 24 August 2026

Lukas Bergquist (born 28 June 2000) is a Swedish footballer who plays as a left-back for AIK.

== Career ==
From Söderhamn, Bergquist started playing on the senior team for hometown club Söderhamns FF in 2017. He continued in the north with Hudiksvalls FF and Umeå FC.

After one and a half season in Umeå, Bergquist was ready for Superettan and the club Östers IF. He made his Superettan debut in October 2023 against Örebro. Bergquist won promotion with Öster from the 2024 Superettan, but faced relegation from the 2025 Allsvenskan and thereafter left the club.

Ahead of the 2026 season there were reports about a possible move abroad, to Sandefjord or Zagłębie Lubin. Instead he ended up remaining in the Allsvenskan, signing for Stockholm giants AIK. By summer, he settled into the left-back position and made his first start at home ground.
