= Viktor Gustafson =

Swedish footballer (born 1995)

Personal information
- Date of birth: 22 March 1995 (age 31)
- Place of birth: Karlshamn, Sweden
- Position: Midfielder

Team information
- Current team: Mjällby AIF
- Number: 7

Senior career*
Years	Team	Apps	(Gls)
2012–2016	Asarums IF	108	(11)
2017	FK Karlskrona	24	(2)
2018–	Mjällby AIF	183	(12)
- * Club domestic league appearances and goals as of 8 July 2026

Viktor Gustafson (born 22 March 1995) is a Swedish professional footballer who plays as a midfielder for Allsvenskan club Mjällby AIF.

== Honours ==
Mjällby IF

- Allsvenskan: 2025
- Svenska Cupen: 2025–26
