= Bork Bang-Kittilsen =

Norwegian footballer (born 2005)

Personal information
- Full name: Bork Classønn Bang-Kittilsen
- Date of birth: 22 March 2005 (age 21)
- Position: Forward

Team information
- Current team: Fredericia

Youth career
- –2018: Nanset
- 2019: Sandefjord
- 2020–2022: Odd

Senior career*
Years	Team	Apps	(Gls)
2022	Odd 3	15	(10)
2022–2023	Odd 2	10	(2)
2023–2024	Odd	32	(4)
2025–2026	Mjällby	17	(0)
2026–	Fredericia	0	(0)

International career^{‡}
2023	Norway U18	6	(2)
2024	Norway U19	11	(2)
2025–	Norway U20	9	(0)
- * Club domestic league appearances and goals as of 8 July 2026 ‡ National team caps and goals as of 13 October 2025

Bork Classønn Bang-Kittilsen (born 22 March 2005) is a Norwegian professional footballer who plays as a forward for Fredericia.

He made his Eliteserien debut as a substitute against Bodø/Glimt on 3 May 2023. In the next match, against Tromsø on 7 May, Bang-Kittilsen scored his first goal, which also became the winning goal. His contract expired as Odd were relegated from the 2024 Eliteserien. He chose to leave Norway and sign for Mjällby AIF. He made his debut in the 2024–25 Svenska Cupen and then in the first round of the 2025 Allsvenskan.

== Honours ==
Mjällby IF

- Allsvenskan: 2025
- Svenska Cupen: 2025–26
