= Ludvig Svanberg =

Swedish footballer

Personal information
- Full name: Ludvig Oliver Svanberg
- Date of birth: 25 December 2002 (age 23)
- Place of birth: Stockholm, Sweden
- Height: 1.94 m (6 ft 4 in)
- Position: Centre-back

Team information
- Current team: Mjällby AIF
- Number: 2

Youth career
- 2008–2019: Hammarby IF

Senior career*
Years	Team	Apps	(Gls)
2020–2023	Hammarby IF	0	(0)
2020	→ IK Frej (loan)	25	(0)
2021–2023	→ Hammarby TFF (res.)	49	(0)
2023	→ GIF Sundsvall (loan)	17	(0)
2024–2025	GIF Sundsvall	41	(3)
2025–	Mjällby AIF	5	(1)
- * Club domestic league appearances and goals as of 8 July 2026

Ludvig Oliver Svanberg (born 25 December 2002) is a Swedish footballer who plays as a centre-back for Allsvenskan club Mjällby.

== Early life ==
Born and raised in Stockholm, Svanberg started to play youth football with local club Hammarby IF.

== Club career ==
=== Hammarby IF ===
On 20 November 2019, Svanberg signed his first professional contract with Hammarby. In 2020, he made his debut in senior football on loan at IK Frej in Ettan, Sweden's third tier, making 25 league appearances at age 17. In both 2021 and 2022, Svanberg played for Hammarby's affiliated club Hammarby TFF, also competing in Ettan, making 44 appearances in total.

On 10 August 2022, he signed a new two-and-a-half-year contract with Hammarby, running until the end of 2024. On 25 February 2023, Svanberg made his competitive debut for the club, starting in a 3–0 away win against Norrby IF in Svenska Cupen.

=== GIF Sundsvall ===
On 6 July 2023, Svanberg was sent on loan to GIF Sundsvall in Superettan, Sweden's second tier, for the rest of the year. After making 17 league appearances for Sundsvall, he completed a permanent transfer to the club on 13 December 2023, signing a multi-year contract.

=== Mjällby AIF ===
On 11 August 2025, Svanberg signed for Mjällby in Allsvenskan from GIF Sundsvall in Superettan with immediate effect.

== International career ==
In September 2019, Svanberg was called up to the Swedish under-19's for three friendlies against Norway, Ireland and Austria, but he remained an unused substitute without making any appearances.

== Career statistics ==
=== Club ===
As of match played 9 August 2025

Club	Season	League			National Cup (Note: Includes Svenska Cupen)		Continental		Total	
Club	Season	Division	Apps	Goals	Apps	Goals	Apps	Goals	Apps	Goals
IK Frej (loan)	2020	Ettan	25	0	0	0	—		25	0
Hammarby TFF (loan)	2021	Ettan	26	0	0	0	—		26	0
Hammarby TFF (loan)	2022	Ettan	18	0	0	0	—		18	0
Hammarby TFF (loan)	2023	Ettan	5	0	0	0	—		5	0
Hammarby TFF (loan)	Total		49	0	0	0	0	0	49	0
GIF Sundsvall (loan)	2023	Superettan	17	0	0	0	—		17	0
Hammarby IF	2023	Allsvenskan	0	0	1	0	0	0	1	0
Mjällby	2025	Allsvenskan	0	0	—		0	0	0	0
Career total			91	0	1	0	0	0	92	0

== Honours ==
Mjällby IF

- Allsvenskan: 2025
- Svenska Cupen: 2025–26
