= Alexander Lundin =

Swedish footballer

Personal information
- Full name: Henric Alexander Lundin
- Date of birth: 25 October 1992 (age 34)
- Place of birth: Nättraby, Sweden
- Height: 1.87 m (6 ft 1 1/2 in)
- Position: Goalkeeper

Team information
- Current team: Mjällby AIF
- Number: 35

Youth career
- –2008: Nättraby GoIF
- 2009: Mjällby AIF

Senior career*
Years	Team	Apps	(Gls)
2010–2014	Mjällby AIF	4	(0)
2014	→ Husqvarna FF (loan)	8	(0)
2015–2016	Falkenbergs FF	13	(0)
2017	Västerås SK	16	(0)
2018–2019	Akropolis IF	25	(0)
2020–2022	Brommapojkarna	39	(0)
2023–	Mjällby AIF	9	(0)

International career
2011	Sweden U19	1	(0)
- * Club domestic league appearances and goals as of 11 November 2025

Alexander Lundin (born 25 October 1992) is a Swedish footballer who plays as a goalkeeper for Allsvenskan club Mjällby AIF.

== Club career ==
In February 2015, Lundin joined Falkenbergs FF.

On 5 March 2020, Lundin signed with Brommapojkarna.

== Honours ==
Mjällby IF

- Allsvenskan: 2025
- Svenska Cupen: 2025–26
