= Axel Norén =

Swedish footballer

Personal information
- Full name: Axel Vilhelm Lindberg Norén
- Date of birth: 4 April 1999 (age 27)
- Place of birth: Sweden
- Height: 1.84 m (6 ft 0 in)
- Position: Centre-back

Team information
- Current team: Mjällby AIF
- Number: 4

Youth career
- Sölvesborgs GoIF
- –2016: Mjällby AIF

Senior career*
Years	Team	Apps	(Gls)
2017–2018	Mjällby AIF	29	(2)
2019–2020	Gefle IF	35	(2)
2020–2021	Falkenbergs FF	35	(1)
2022–2024	GAIS	77	(7)
2025–	Mjällby AIF	37	(2)
- * Club domestic league appearances and goals as of 8 July 2026

Axel Vilhelm Lindberg Norén (born 4 April 1999) is a Swedish footballer who plays as a centre-back for Allsvenskan club Mjällby AIF and the Sweden national team.

== Club career ==
Following spells with Mjällby AIF and Gefle IF, Norén moved to Falkenbergs FF in the summer of 2020 and made his Allsvenskan debut in September. Following two straight relegations from the 2020 Allsvenskan and the 2021 Superettan, he experienced two straight promotions with GAIS, from the 2022 Ettan and the 2023 Superettan.

In the summer of 2024, he was approached by Eredivisie team Almere City.

== International career ==
In June 2025, Norén was selected for the senior Sweden squad for friendly matches against Hungary and Algeria on 6 and 10 June 2025, respectively.

== Honours ==
Mjällby IF

- Allsvenskan: 2025
- Svenska Cupen: 2025–26
