= Adam Petersson =

Swedish footballer

Personal information
- Date of birth: 25 August 2000 (age 26)
- Place of birth: Sweden
- Position: Midfielder

Team information
- Current team: Mjällby
- Number: 21

Youth career
- –2019: Mjällby

Senior career*
Years	Team	Apps	(Gls)
2019–	Mjällby	30	(0)
- * Club domestic league appearances and goals as of 11 November 2025

Adam Petersson (born 25 August 2000) is a Swedish footballer who plays as a midfielder for Mjällby in the Allsvenskan.

== Career ==
=== Mjällby ===
A graduate of the club's youth academy, Petersson made his league debut for the club on 22 June 2020, coming on as a 66th-minute substitute for David Batanero in a 2–2 draw with Göteborg.

== Honours ==
Mjällby IF

- Allsvenskan: 2025
