= Hans Larsson (footballer) =

Swedish footballer

Personal information
- Date of birth: 19 February 1962 (age 64)
- Position: Midfielder

Team information
- Current team: Mjällby AIF (director of sports)

Youth career
- Pukaviks IF

Senior career*
Years	Team	Apps	(Gls)
1979–1993	Mjällby AIF		

Managerial career
- 1993–1995: Sölvesborgs GIF
- 1996–1998: Olofströms IF
- 1999–2002: Mjällby AIF
- 2004–2005: Karlskrona AIF
- Sölvesborgs GIF
- 2015: Mjällby AIF
- 2016–: Mjällby AIF (director of sports)
- * Club domestic league appearances and goals

Hans "Hasse" Larsson (born 19 February 1962) is a Swedish footballer who played as a midfielder. He played for Mjällby AIF during several spells in Allsvenskan, and later managed the club for two spells before taking over as director of sports.

== Playing career ==
Larsson started his youth career in Pukaviks IF. Larsson then joined Mjällby AIF as a teenager in 1979, and as a squad player he helped the team win the 1979 Division 2 and thus promotion to the 1980 Allsvenskan. Mjällby faced instant relegation, and Larsson was a part of the same promotion/relegation cycle in 1982/1983 and 1984/1985. In total Larsson spent 14 years at Mjällby, retiring in 1993.

Larsson got married, had two children and settled as a farmer in Ysane. He later worked at a football gymnasium in Sölvesborg and was part-owner of House of Padel. He entered a new relationship and had twins, residing in Hällevik.

== Managing career ==
After retiring as a player, Larsson started coaching on a hobby level. He took over Sölvesborgs GIF and led them to promotion to the 1994 Division 3. Moving to Olofströms IF in 1996, they won back-to-back promotions to the 1997 Division 3 and to the 1998 Division 2.

Larsson finally reunited with Mjällby in 1999 as manager. In 2000 the team reached the playoffs for the Allsvenskan against Häcken. Mjällby lost on aggregate, and the same thing repeated itself in 2001. Larsson left in 2002.

In 2004 and 2005, Larsson was the manager of Karlskrona AIF, which was relegated from the 2004 Division 2 but subsequently won re-promotion. Ahead of the 2005 season, Larsson became a part-time player developer at IFK Karlshamn and joined the coaching staff of Sölvesborgs GIF. He managed Sölvesborg for several seasons. In 2012 he underwent acute surgery for a brain tumor.

In 2015 he briefly served as manager of Mjällby again, when the club performed badly in the 2015 Superettan, but Larsson could not avoid relegation. Playing on the third tier in 2016, the budget was tight and Larsson reluctantly took the role of director of sports. As Mjällby managed to climb back and re-entered Allsvenskan in 2020, and stayed there for several seasons, Larsson gained more and more notoriety as sporting director. He was old-fashioned, having no personal office and not even using a computer. Larsson instead relied on personal contacts in the football world as well as scouting players personally, watching up to four live matches in a day.

Larsson ranked Carlos Moros Gracia and Jacob Bergström among his best finds. His least successful signings were Enoch Kofi Adu, whose "gas had run out" when Mjällby signed him, and Sam Johnson.
