= Abdoulie Manneh =

Gambian footballer

Personal information
- Date of birth: 29 September 2004 (age 22)
- Place of birth: Tujereng, Gambia
- Height: 1.79 m (5 ft 10 in)
- Positions: Winger; forward

Team information
- Current team: Cercle Brugge (on loan from Mjällby AIF)
- Number: 20

Senior career*
Years	Team	Apps	(Gls)
2021–2024	Wallidan		
2024–	Mjällby	60	(11)
2026–	→ Cercle Brugge (loan)	0	(0)

International career^{‡}
2022–	Gambia	7	(3)
- * Club domestic league appearances and goals as of 14 August 2026 ‡ National team caps and goals as of 14 October 2025

Abdoulie Manneh (born 29 September 2004) is a Gambian footballer who plays as a winger or forward for Belgian Pro League club Cercle Brugge on loan from Swedish club Mjällby AIF.

== Career ==
In the Gambia, he played for Wallidan FC. The team won the 2022 Gambian Cup. Manneh also made his international debut for The Gambia in the back-to-back 2022 African Nations Championship qualification matches against Guinea-Bissau.

Ahead of the 2024 Allsvenskan season Manneh travelled to Sweden and went on trial with Mjällby AIF, where he soon secured a contract. His first start came against Malmö in July 2024. His first Allsvenskan goal came in a 3–0 routing of Kalmar in October 2024. The goal was described as a "dream goal", finding the upper corner of the net. He proceeded to score in the 2024-25 Svenska cupen against Gefle and Halmstad. His first hat-trick came in late April against Degerfors, scoring the first, second and fourth goal of the evening. He was noted for his goal celebration, removing his jersey and hanging it on the corner flag. By that time, he had scored 5 goals in the first 6 games of the 2025 Allsvenskan. His 6th goal was a decisive goal against Brommapojkarna, which also put Mjällby on top of the Allsvenskan table. Manneh was now sought after by several European clubs.In August 2026, Manneh joined Belgian club Cercle Brugge on a season-long loan with an option to buy.

== Career statistics ==
As of 1 July 2025:

=== Club ===
As of match played 6 February 2025

Appearances and goals by club, season and competition
Club	Season	League			National cup		Continental		Other		Total	
Club	Season	Division	Apps	Goals	Apps	Goals	Apps	Goals	Apps	Goals	Apps	Goals
Mjällby	2024	Allsvenskan	21	2	4	0	—		—		25	2
Mjällby	2025	Allsvenskan	19	6	5	2	—		—		24	8
Mjällby	Total		40	8	9	2	—		—		49	10
Career total			40	8	9	2	0	0	0	0	49	10

== Honours ==
Wallidan

- Gambian Cup: 2022

Mjällby AIF

- Allsvenskan: 2025
- Svenska Cupen: 2025–26

Individual

- GFA League First Division Young Player of the Season: 2020–21
