= Noel Törnqvist =

Swedish footballer (born 2002)

- Törnqvist with Sweden U21 in 2023

Personal information
- Full name: Noel Max Joachim Törnqvist
- Date of birth: 1 February 2002 (age 24)
- Height: 1.97 m (6 ft 6 in)
- Position: Goalkeeper

Team information
- Current team: Monza (on loan from Como)
- Number: 1

Youth career
- Snöstorp Nyhem FF
- –2017: Halmstads BK
- 2018: IS Halmia

Senior career*
Years	Team	Apps	(Gls)
2018–2019	IS Halmia	22	(0)
2020–2025	Mjällby AIF	77	(0)
2021	→ AFC Eskilstuna (loan)	9	(0)
2025–	Como	0	(0)
2025	→ Mjällby AIF (loan)	7	(0)
2026–	→ Monza (loan)	6	(0)

International career^{‡}
2019	Sweden U19	1	(0)
2022–2024	Sweden U21	6	(0)
2026–	Sweden	1	(0)
- * Club domestic league appearances and goals as of 08:36, 1 November 2026 (UTC) ‡ National team caps and goals as of 23:40, 17 November 2026 (UTC)

Noel Max Joachim Törnqvist (born 1 February 2002) is a Swedish professional footballer who plays as a goalkeeper for Serie A club Monza, on loan from Como and the Sweden national team.

== Club career ==
=== Youth ===
Törnqvist started his youth career in Snöstorp Nyhem FF as an outfield player. He went on to Halmstads BK and became a goalkeeper at age 15, opting to join the smaller city rivals IS Halmia in 2018. He trained with several foreign clubs, namely Leeds United in 2017 and Hellas Verona in 2018.

=== IS Halmia ===
Törnqvist joined IS Halmia in 2018 and played for the club in Sweden’s Division 2. Over the 2018 and 2019 seasons, he made 22 league appearance. In late 2019, it was confirmed that he would leave the club, with his transfer regarded as IS Halmia’s largest outgoing deal in two decades.

=== Mjällby ===
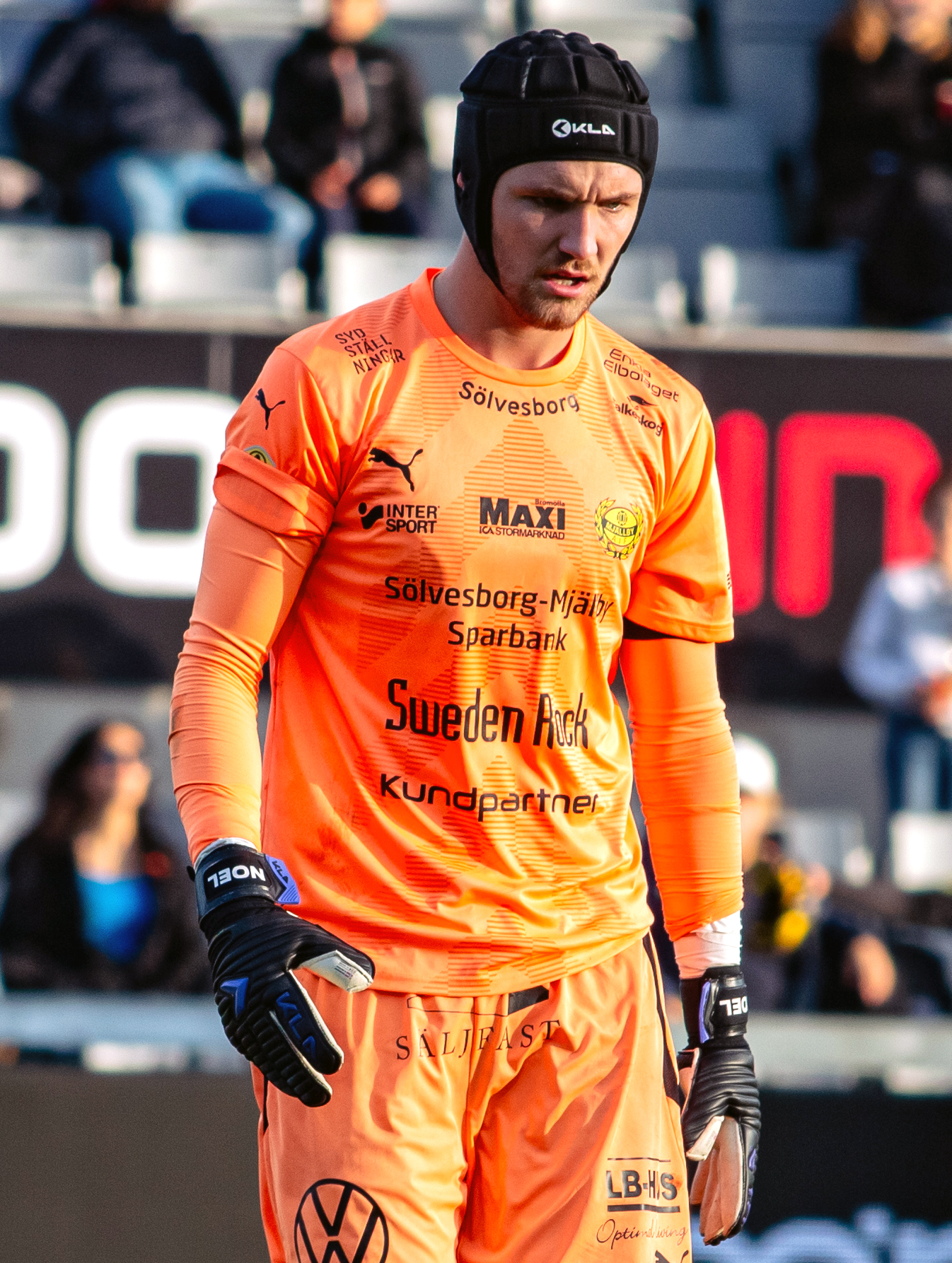
Törnqvist with Mjällby in 2023

Törnqvist completed a move to Mjällby ahead of the 2020 Allsvenskan season. He initially joined as a developing player within the senior squad and spent his first year at the club without making a league appearance.

In 2022 he played only one league match, his Allsvenskan debut, keeping a clean sheet against Djurgården. He also prolonged his Mjällby contract until 2026.

In 2023 he played the 2022–23 Svenska Cupen final which Mjällby lost. The coaches declared Törnqvist to be their first-choice goalkeeper for the season. Shortly into the 2023 season, he received praise for ascending to the level of a good Allsvenskan goalkeeper.

==== Loan to AFC Eskilstuna ====
The 2021 season saw Törnqvist loaned out to Superettan club AFC Eskilstuna. He played 10 matches for AFC, but featured infrequently. When he was omitted from the starting eleven during the closing months of the season, he called it "not fair".

=== Como ===
On 31 August 2025, Törnqvist completed a move to Serie A club Como. The agreement included a loan-back arrangement that allowed him to stay at Mjällby and finish the remainder of the Allsvenskan season before joining Como. That season, Törnqvist helped Mjällby to their first league title, and was awarded the Best Goalkeeper of the 2025 Allsvenskan.

==== Loan to Monza ====
On 31 August 2026, Törnqvist was sent on a one-year loan to Serie A club Monza.

== International career ==
Törnqvist represented Sweden in a U17 three-nation tournament, playing against the Czech Republic. In 2021 he was called up to Sweden U21 for the first time, making his debut in 2022.

== Personal life ==
Törnqvist is noted for wearing a protective helmet during matches, which he began using after sustaining a head injury during his youth career.

== Career statistics ==
=== Club ===
As of match played 8 November 2026

Appearances and goals by club, season and competition
Club	Season	League			National cup (Note: Includes Svenska Cupen, Coppa Italia)		Total	
Club	Season	Division	Apps	Goals	Apps	Goals	Apps	Goals
IS Halmia	2018	Division 2 Västra Götaland	0	0	—		0	0
IS Halmia	2019	Division 2 Västra Götaland	22	0	—		22	0
IS Halmia	Total		22	0	0	0	22	0
Mjällby	2020	Allsvenskan	0	0	1	0	1	0
Mjällby	2022	Allsvenskan	1	0	0	0	1	0
Mjällby	2023	Allsvenskan	27	0	6	0	33	0
Mjällby	2024	Allsvenskan	27	0	1	0	28	0
Mjällby	2025	Allsvenskan	22	0	3	0	25	0
Mjällby	Total		77	0	11	0	88	0
AFC Eskilstuna (loan)	2021	Allsvenskan	9	0	4	0	13	0
Como	2026–27	Serie A	0	0	—		0	0
Mjällby (loan)	2025	Allsvenskan	7	0	—		7	0
Monza (loan)	2026–27	Serie A	7	0	0	0	7	0
			122	0	15	0	137	0

=== International ===
As of match played 17 November 2026

Appearances and goals by national team and year
National team	Year	Apps	Goals
Sweden	2026	1	0
Total		1	0

== Honours ==
Mjällby IF

- Allsvenskan: 2025

Individual

- Allsvenskan Best Goalkeeper of the Season: 2025
