= Rasmus Niklasson Petrovic =

Swedish footballer (born 2003)

Personal information
- Full name: Rasmus Patrik Niklasson Petrovic
- Date of birth: 17 May 2003 (age 23)
- Position: Forward

Team information
- Current team: GAIS
- Number: 11

Youth career
- Sävedalens IF
- –2019: Bälinge IF
- 2020–2022: IK Sirius

Senior career*
Years	Team	Apps	(Gls)
2019	Bälinge IF	7	(0)
2023	Dalkurd FF	27	(4)
2024	Oskarshamns AIK	25	(8)
2025–	GAIS	38	(6)
- * Club domestic league appearances and goals as of 8 July 2026

Rasmus Niklasson Petrovic (born 17 May 2003) is a Swedish footballer who plays as a forward for GAIS in Allsvenskan.

== Career ==
He started his youth career in Sävedalens IF before moving on to Bälinge IF in another part of Sweden, outside Uppsala. In 2019 he even started his senior career in Bälinge, before moving to the academy of IK Sirius. Here he played for their U17 and U19 teams.

His first major senior club was Dalkurd FF in 2023, where he scored four goals. Having gone on to Ettan club Oskarshamns AIK in 2024, he had scored the same number of goals three months into the season. Now, interest was shown from larger Swedish clubs. In the summer of 2024 he agreed to move up two divisions, transferring to GAIS. As Oskarshamn struggled in the table, the transfer was postponed to the winter of 2025.

He scored on his GAIS debut, a 2024–25 Svenska Cupen match against Örebro.

== Personal life ==
He was formerly named Johansson, but changed his surname to Petrovic alongside the rest of his family.
