= Jesper Gustavsson =

Swedish footballer

Personal information
- Full name: Per Jesper Gustavsson
- Date of birth: 29 October 1994 (age 32)
- Height: 1.74 m (5 ft 8 1/2 in)
- Position: Midfielder

Team information
- Current team: Mjällby AIF
- Number: 22

Youth career
- –2009: Björkenäs/Pukaviks IF
- 2009–2013: Mjällby AIF

Senior career*
Years	Team	Apps	(Gls)
2013–	Mjällby AIF	289	(4)
2015	→ FK Mjølner (loan)	10	(0)
- * Club domestic league appearances and goals as of 8 July 2026

Per Jesper Gustavsson (born 29 October 1994) is a Swedish footballer who plays as a midfielder for Mjällby AIF. He made his debut in Allsvenskan for Mjällby on 19 August 2013 as an 18-year-old against Helsingborgs IF.

== Honours ==
Mjällby IF

- Allsvenskan: 2025
- Svenska Cupen: 2025–26
