= Jakob Kiilerich =

Danish footballer (born 2000)

Personal information
- Full name: Jakob Kiilerich Rask
- Date of birth: 10 May 2000 (age 26)
- Place of birth: Horsens, Denmark
- Height: 1.90 m (6 ft 3 in)
- Position: Centre-back

Team information
- Current team: Zulte Waregem
- Number: 5

Youth career
- –2019: Horsens

Senior career*
Years	Team	Apps	(Gls)
2019–2024	Kolding	113	(7)
2024	→ Mjällby (loan)	21	(2)
2025	Mjällby	17	(1)
2025–	Zulte Waregem	29	(0)
- * Club domestic league appearances and goals as of 11 May 2026

Jakob Kiilerich Rask (born 10 May 2000) is a Danish footballer who plays as a centre-back for Belgian Pro League club Zulte Waregem.

== Career ==
He was born in Horsens. Playing for the academy of AC Horsens, he was lauded as the best player for the U17 team in the first half of the 2016–17 season.

Kiilerich started his senior career in Kolding IF, making his debut in the Danish 1st Division in 2019. In March 2024 he was loaned by Swedish Allsvenskan team Mjällby AIF. In his Allsvenskan debut on 21 April, he also scored a goal, though Mjällby lost 2–1. On 29 April, he scored his second goal, this time a decisive goal in a 3–2 victory over Kalmar. However, Kiilerich was accused of handballing as the goal went in, which would be illegal. Kiilerich claimed that the ball hit his shoulder, which is legal. No video gave a clear answer.

On 30 September 2024, it was announced that Kiilerich would join Mjällby permanently in 2025.

On 3 August 2025, Kiilerich signed for Belgian Pro League club Zulte Waregem from Mjällby with immediate effect.

== Personal life ==
When joining Mjällby he took up residence in Sölvesborg, being an immediate neighbour of five Mjällby teammates.
