= Calvin Kabuye =

Ugandan footballer (born 2003)

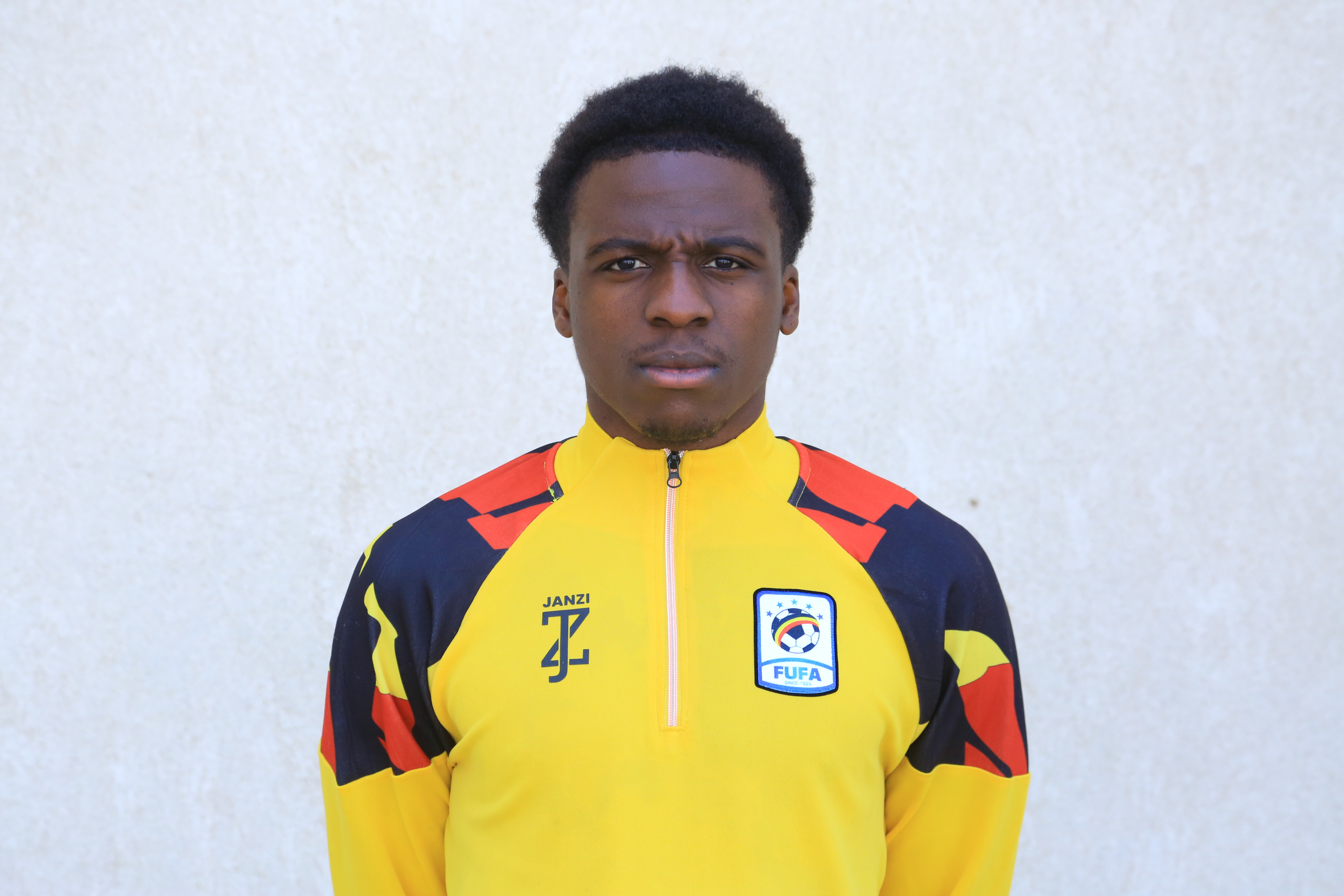

Personal information
- Full name: Hope Calvin Ddamulira Kabuye
- Date of birth: 28 March 2003 (age 23)
- Place of birth: Huddinge, Sweden
- Height: 1.83 m (6 ft 0 in)
- Position: Winger

Team information
- Current team: KuPS
- Number: 19

Youth career
- 2008–2010: IF Olympia
- 2010–2015: Sköndals IK
- 2015–2021: AIK

Senior career*
Years	Team	Apps	(Gls)
2021–2023	AIK	0	(0)
2022	→ Vasalund IF (loan)	28	(15)
2023	→ Östersunds FK (loan)	29	(4)
2023–2024	Sandvikens IF	29	(9)
2025–2026	Mjällby AIF	4	(0)
2025	→ Varbergs BoIS (loan)	16	(1)
2026–	KuPS	5	(0)

International career^{‡}
2023	Sweden U20	1	(0)
2024–	Uganda	3	(0)
- * Club domestic league appearances and goals as of 12 November 2026 ‡ National team caps and goals as of 19:09, 7 April 2025 (UTC)

Hope Calvin Ddamulira Kabuye (born 28 March 2003) is a professional football player who plays as a winger for KuPS. Born in Sweden, he plays for the Uganda national football team.

== Career ==
Kabuye began playing football at the age of 5 with the youth side of IF Olimpia before moving to Sköndals IK, and then finishing his development with the academy of AIK in 2015. After working his way up their youth sides, he started training with their senior team in 2021. On 18 March 2022, he signed a first team contract with AIK until December 2024, and that day was loaned to Vasalund IF in the Ettan on a season-long loan. He returned to AIK for the preseason in January 2023, and made his senior debut in a 3–0 Svenska Cupen win over Varbergs BoIS on 6 March 2023. On 29 March 2023, he joined Östersunds FK on a season-long loan in the Superettan. On 6 December 2023, he transferred to Sandvikens IF on a 3-year contract. On 14 December 2024, he transferred to the Allsvenskan side Mjällby AIF.

On 7 February 2026, Kabuye was announced at KuPS.

== International career ==
Born in Sweden, Kabuye is of Ugandan descent. In November 2023, he was called up to the Sweden U20 for a set of friendlies. He was called up to the Uganda national football team for a set of 2025 Africa Cup of Nations qualification matches in November 2024.
