= Ludwig Małachowski Thorell =

Swedish footballer (born 2005)

Ludwig Malachowski Thorell
Personal information
- Full name: Ludwig Simon Malachowski Thorell
- Date of birth: 25 February 2005 (age 21)
- Height: 1.75 m (5 ft 9 in)
- Position: Midfielder

Team information
- Current team: Basel
- Number: 8

Youth career
- –2022: IF Brommapojkarna

Senior career*
Years	Team	Apps	(Gls)
2022–2023	IF Brommapojkarna	1	(0)
2023	AFC Eskilstuna	7	(1)
2024	Sandvikens IF	30	(0)
2025–2026	Mjällby AIF	35	(4)
2026–	Basel	9	(0)

International career^{‡}
2021–2022	Sweden U17	14	(1)
2022–2023	Sweden U19	6	(0)
2025–2026	Sweden U21	5	(0)
- * Club domestic league appearances and goals as of 28 September 2026 ‡ National team caps and goals as of 17:45, 1 April 2026 (UTC)

Ludwig Simon Malachowski Thorell (Polish: Małachowski; born 25 February 2005) is a Swedish professional footballer who plays as a midfielder for Swiss Super League club Basel.

== Career ==
Playing for IF Brommapojkarna since childhood, Malachowski advanced through its elite boys teams, and became a Sweden youth international. When he was 16 years old, Brommapojkarna refused an offer from AS Roma to buy him. He contested the 2022 UEFA European Under-17 Championship.

He first appeared on the bench for Brommapojkarna in 2021, made his Cup debut in August 2022 and his Superettan debut in November 2022. However, he found it difficult to establish himself in the first team. Following a loan to AFC Eskilstuna in 2023, he transferred to Sandvikens IF in 2024 on a three-year contract.

Having impressed in the 2024 Superettan, Malachowski was bought by Allsvenskan club Mjällby AIF in January 2025. He scored his first Mjällby goals in the ultimate friendly match in March 2025 before the start of the 2025 Allsvenskan. His first league goal came against Hammarby, helping Mjällby win 3–1. He continued scoring goals, and Mjällby found themselves atop the Allsvenskan table after one third of the season.

On 7 July 2026, Malachowski signed a four-season contract with Basel in Switzerland.

== Personal life ==
He is born to a Swedish father and Polish mother, and is a devout Catholic.

== Honours ==
Mjällby IF

- Allsvenskan: 2025
- Svenska Cupen: 2025–26
