= Strandvallen =

Sports venue in Hällevik, Sweden

Coordinates: 56°00′43″N 14°42′59″E

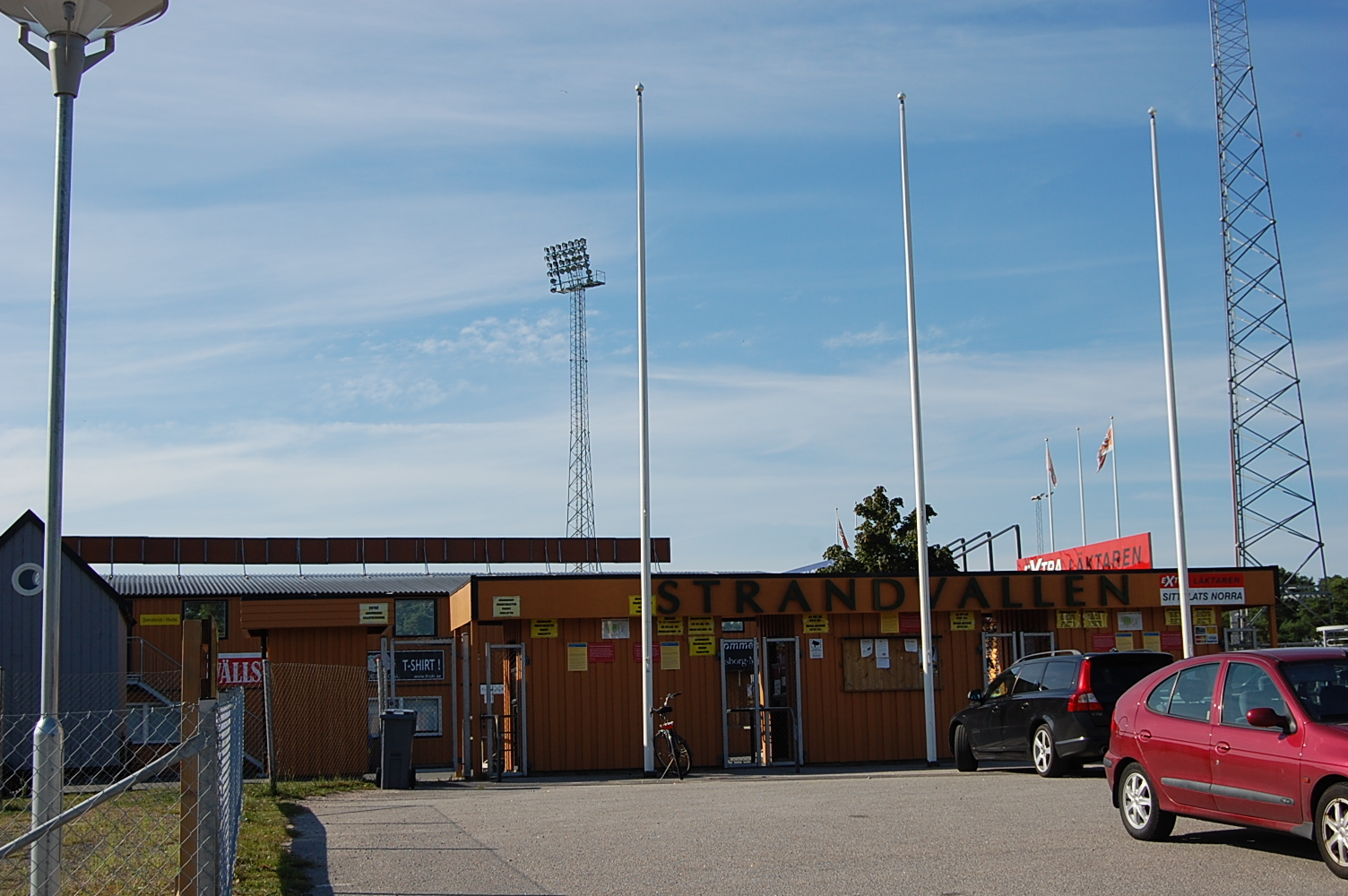
- Exterior of Strandvallen
- Interactive map of Strandvallen
- Location: Hällevik, Sweden
- Capacity: 6,000

Construction
- Opened: 1953
- Renovated: 2002
- Expanded: 2010 and 2012

Tenant
- Mjällby AIF

Strandvallen is a multi-use stadium in Hällevik, Sweden. It is currently used mostly for football matches and is the home stadium of Mjällby AIF. The stadium holds 6,000 people and was built in 1953.

== External sources ==
- Strandvallen
