= Anders Torstensson (football manager) =

Swedish footballer and manager

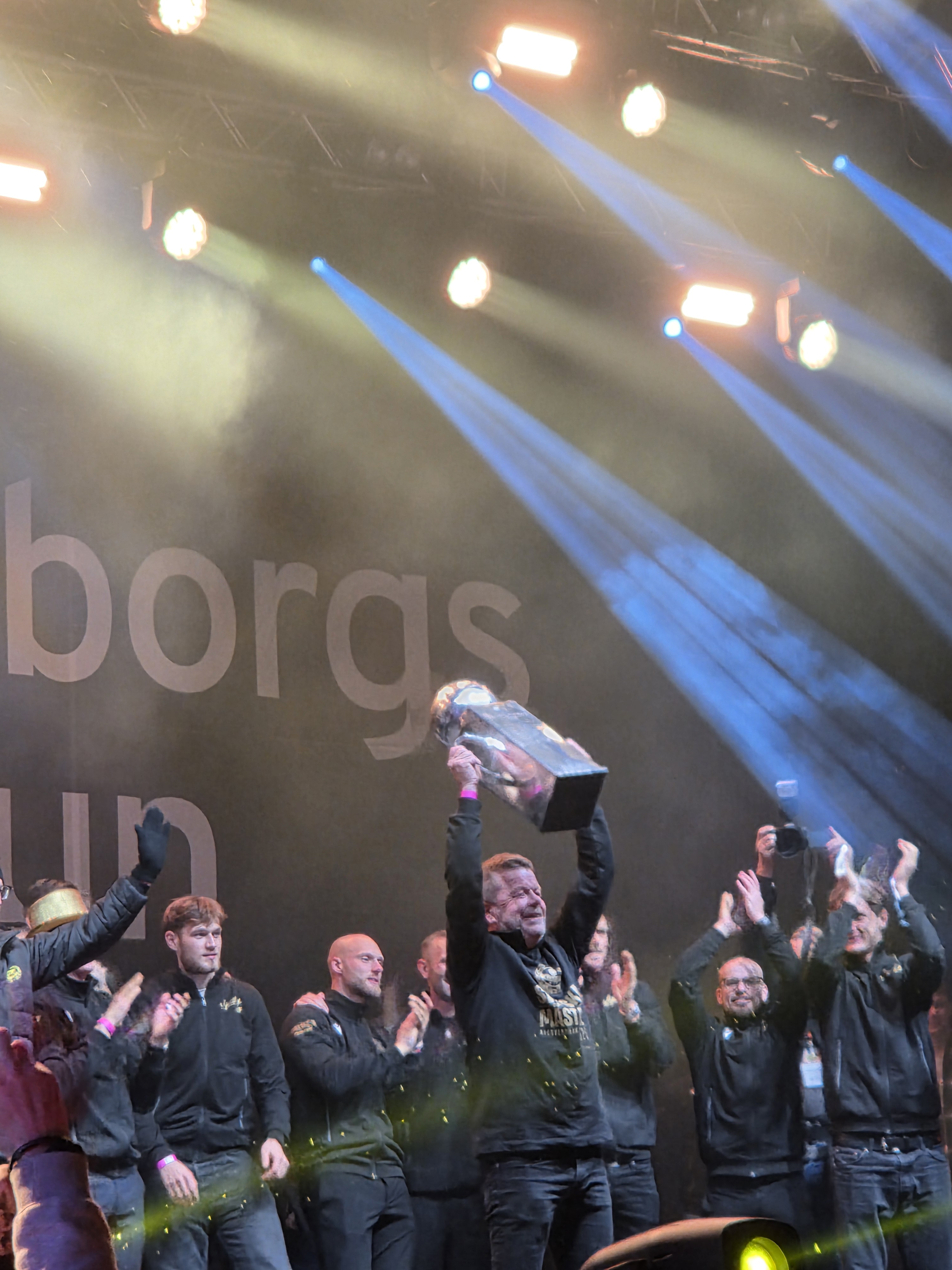
- Torstensson celebrating the Swedish championship in 2025

Personal information
- Date of birth: 19 February 1966 (age 60)
- Place of birth: Sweden

Team information
- Current team: Mjällby AIF (technical director)

Managerial career
- Years: Team
- 2013: Mjällby AIF
- 2015: Asarums IF
- 2016–2018: FK Karlskrona
- 2021: Mjällby AIF
- 2023–2025: Mjällby AIF

Anders Torstensson (born 19 February 1966) is a Swedish professional football coach. He is currently the technical director of Allsvenskan club Mjällby. When not working in football, he has been a school principal.

== Career ==
When Torstensson was appointed manager of Mjällby in 2023 for his third spell at the club, he later led the team to the 2025 Allsvenskan title and was named Coach of the Year. Following the title-winning season, he was appointed technical director of the club.

== Honours ==
FK Karlskrona

- Division 2 Södra: 2016

Mjällby

- Allsvenskan: 2025

Manager of the year

- Allsvenskan: 2025
