= Hällevik =

- Location within Blekinge Location within Sweden
- Coordinates: 56°01′N 14°42′E
- Country: Sweden
- Province: Blekinge
- County: Blekinge County
- Municipality: Sölvesborg Municipality

Area
  - Total: 0.87 km^{2} (0.34 sq mi)

Population (31 December 2023)
  - Total: 1,485
  - Density: 940/km^{2} (2,400/sq mi)
- Time zone: UTC+1 (CET)
  - Summer (DST): UTC+2 (CEST)

Hällevik is a locality situated in Sölvesborg Municipality, Blekinge County, Sweden, with 1485 inhabitants in 2023.

== 1862 Tragedy in the Baltic ==
Seven herring fishermen from Hällevik drowned on 17 October 1862. The men, including a father and son, left wives and children. Their names are listed in the Mjällby church archives: Masse Jönsson, Jöns Håkansson, Bengt Håkansson, Hans Jönsson, Sven Pehrsson, Ola Christoffersson, and Sven Christoffersson.

== Sport ==
Mjällby AIF is a Swedish football club founded in 1939. The club has become one of the most notable teams in Swedish football, despite coming from a small community. Remarkably, in 2025 they won the Allsvenskan title, the nation's top tier.
