= 2025 Allsvenskan =

Football league season in Sweden

Allsvenskan
- Season: 2025
- Dates: 29 March 2025 – 9 November 2025
- Champions: Mjällby AIF; 1st Allsvenskan title 1st Swedish title
- Relegated: IFK Norrköping; Östers IF; IFK Värnamo
- Champions League: Mjällby AIF
- Europa League: Hammarby IF
- Conference League: GAIS; IFK Göteborg
- Matches: 240
- Goals: 683 (2.85 per match)
- Top goalscorer: Ibrahim Diabate; August Priske (18 goals each)
- Biggest home win: Djurgårdens IF 8–2 IK Sirius (29 September 2025)
- Biggest away win: Halmstads BK 0–5 Degerfors IF (30 March 2025); BK Häcken 1–6 Djurgårdens IF (27 July 2025)
- Highest scoring: IF Brommapojkarna 6–4 IFK Norrköping (2 August 2025); Djurgårdens IF 8–2 IK Sirius (29 September 2025)
- Longest winning run: 6 matches Mjällby AIF
- Longest unbeaten run: 16 matches Mjällby AIF
- Longest winless run: 14 matches IFK Värnamo; Degerfors IF
- Longest losing run: 7 matches IFK Värnamo; Degerfors IF
- Highest attendance: 47,727; AIK 0–0 Hammarby IF (18 May 2025)
- Lowest attendance: 530; IF Brommapojkarna 3–2 IFK Värnamo (20 April 2025)
- Average attendance: 10,982

The 2025 Allsvenskan was the 101st season since its establishment in 1924 of Sweden's top-level football league, Allsvenskan. The season began on 29 March 2025 and ended on 9 November 2025 (not including relegation play-off matches).

Mjällby AIF secured their first championship title on 20 October by defeating IFK Göteborg 2–0 at Gamla Ullevi. This made Mjällby the 21st club to win the title. On 25 October Mjällby broke the points record previously held by AIK and Malmö FF (in 2018 and 2010 respectively) at 67 points in their following match by defeating IFK Norrköping 2–1. The record eventually landed at 75 points.

AIK drew the highest average home league attendance with 30,024, followed by Hammarby with 24,297 and DIF with 19,400.

== Teams ==
The league consisted of sixteen teams; the top fourteen sides from the previous season, and two teams promoted from the 2024 Superettan. The promoted teams were Degerfors IF (promoted after a single year absence) and Östers IF (promoted after a 11 years absence), replacing the Allsvenskan relegated teams of Kalmar FF (relegated after 21 years in top flight) and Västerås SK (relegated after a single year in top flight). Malmö FF entered the season as defending champions.

Location of teams in the 2025 Allsvenskan

Location of teams in the 2025 Allsvenskan in Stockholm Municipality
Allsvenskan clubs in Västra Götaland County

=== Stadiums and locations ===
Team	Location	Stadium	Turf	Stadium capacity
AIK	Solna	Nationalarenan (Note: Known as Strawberry Arena for sponsorship reasons.)	Natural	50,000
BK Häcken	Gothenburg	Bravida Arena	Artificial	6,316
Degerfors IF	Degerfors	Stora Valla	Natural	5,880
Djurgårdens IF	Stockholm	3Arena	Artificial	30,000
GAIS	Gothenburg	Gamla Ullevi	Natural	18,454
Halmstads BK	Halmstad	Örjans Vall	Natural	10,873
Hammarby IF	Stockholm	3Arena	Artificial	30,000
IF Brommapojkarna	Stockholm	Grimsta IP	Artificial	5,000
IF Elfsborg	Borås	Borås Arena	Artificial	16,200
IFK Göteborg	Gothenburg	Gamla Ullevi	Natural	18,454
IFK Norrköping	Norrköping	Nya Parken (Note: Known as PlatinumCars Arena for sponsorship reasons.)	Artificial	16,000
IFK Värnamo	Värnamo	Finnvedsvallen	Natural	5,000
IK Sirius	Uppsala	Studenternas IP	Artificial	10,522
Malmö FF	Malmö	Stadion (Note: Known as Eleda Stadion for sponsorship reasons.)	Natural	22,500
Mjällby AIF	Hällevik	Strandvallen	Natural	7,500
Östers IF	Växjö	Spiris Arena	Natural	12,000

=== Personnel and kits ===
All teams are obligated to have the logo of the league sponsor Unibet as well as the Allsvenskan logo on the right sleeve of their shirt.

Note: Flags indicate national team as has been defined under FIFA eligibility rules. Players and Managers may hold more than one non-FIFA nationality.

Team	Head coach	Captain	Kit manufacturer	Sponsors	
Team	Head coach	Captain	Kit manufacturer	Main	Other(s)
AIK	(Faroe Islands) Mikkjal Thomassen	(Sweden) Anton Salétros	(United States) Nike	Truecaller	List: Front: Craftor; Back: Svea Bank; Sleeves: Stadium Sverige; Shorts: Volkswagen; Socks: None
BK Häcken	(Sweden) Jens Gustafsson	(Sweden) Simon Gustafson	(Germany) Puma	BRA Bygg	List: Front: Volkswagen, Sankt Jörgen Park, Nordic Wellness; Back: Gevab Group, Brion Gruppen, Prefabsystem Syd; Sleeves: Stadium Sverige; Shorts: Varis Förvaltning, Länsförsäkringar Göteborg och Bohus, Demo Group, K-Bygg; Socks: Maxxis Tyres
Degerfors IF	(Eritrea) Henok Goitom	(Sweden) Nahom Netabay	(England) Umbro	Helmia	List: Front: Helmia; Back: Sleeves: Shorts: Socks:
Djurgårdens IF	(Finland) Jani Honkavaara	(Sweden) Jacob Une	(Germany) Adidas	Mobill Parkering	List: Front: Nordic Wellness; Back: Sundström Safety, TCL Technology; Sleeves: Stadium Sverige; Shorts: Volkswagen; Socks: None
GAIS	(Sweden) Fredrik Holmberg	(Sweden) August Wängberg	(Denmark) Select	ITS Indeship	List: Front: SKAB Gruppen, Good Advice Sverige; Back: Nordic Wellness, various; Sleeves: Stadium Sverige; Shorts: AVIX, Safe Scaff, Åke Ekstrand Byggnads, Good Advice Sverige, Folie & Papper, Bostjärnan, Länsförsäkringar Göteborg och Bohus; Socks: None
Halmstads BK	(Sweden) Johan Lindholm	(Sweden) Joel Allansson	(Italy) Macron	Getinge	List: Front: Cityfastigheter, Getinge, Sportringen, ClickitUp; Back: EAB AB, Östras Stenugnsbageriet; Sleeves: HFAB; Shorts: Volkswagen MotorHalland, Jonab Anläggnings, Villalivet, Länsförsäkringar Halland; Socks: GN Transport
Hammarby IF	(Sweden) Kim Hellberg	(Sweden) Nahir Besara	(Sweden) Craft	Projob Workwear	List: Front: Nordic Wellness, Intersport, Sesol Jönköping; Back: Sefina Pantbank; Sleeves: Berges Schakt & Transport; Shorts: Volkswagen, J&S Markservice; Socks: Clinton Mätkonsult
IF Brommapojkarna	(Sweden) Ulf Kristiansson (Sweden) Fredrik Landén	(Norway) Even Hovland	(United States) Nike	Bredbandsval.se	List: Front: Nöjd AB, Nordic Wellness; Back: None; Sleeves: Stadium Sverige; Shorts: Norteam, Bauhaus, Stora Coop; Socks: None
IF Elfsborg	(Sweden) Oscar Hiljemark	(Sweden) Johan Larsson	(England) Umbro	Sparbanken Sjuhärad	List: Front: Volkswagen Toveks Bil, Effektiv, RO-Gruppen, Input interior, Borås; Back: Pulsen Group, Rudholm Group; Sleeves: Musiklagret, Autocirc; Shorts: Infrakraft, Ellos, Skrotfrag, C Land Logistics, EAB, Cernera Fastigheter; Socks: SGA Conveyor System
IFK Göteborg	(Sweden) Stefan Billborn	(Sweden) Gustav Svensson	(Sweden) Craft	Serneke	List: Front: Serneke, Fameco, Merinfo; Back: Nordic Wellness, Mobill; Sleeves: None; Shorts: MG Motor; Socks: None
IFK Norrköping	(Sweden) Martin Falk	(Sweden) Christoffer Nyman	(Germany) Adidas	Holmen	List: Front: Volkswagen, Stadium Sverige, Söderbergs Bil; Back: Let's create Norrköping, Lantmännen Biorefineries, PlatinumCars; Sleeves: Lundberg Fastigheter; Shorts: Länsförsäkringar Östgöta, Månsson Rör, PreZero; Socks: Ocab
IFK Värnamo	(Norway) Arne Sandstø	(Sweden) Freddy Winsth	(Germany) Puma	Liljedahl Group	List: Front: Zinkteknik, Nominit, Torrbollen Home, Liljedahl Group, Troax, Bufab, Konstsmide, DS Smith, Sandahls, 3M Peltor, Nyfosa, EAB, Heco Skruv; Back: Värnamo Energi, Finnvedsbostäder, GA Industri, Ramo Group; Sleeves: Stadium Sverige; Shorts: Nivika, Ramo Group, Ravema; Socks: Four Office
IK Sirius	(Sweden) Andreas Engelmark	(Sweden) Adam Wikman	(Denmark) Select	ByggConstruct	List: Front: Toyo Tires, Sfär, Högbergs Buss, ICA Supermarket Luthagens Livs, Maskin & Verktyg; Back: Årsta Tak, Nordic Wellness, inkClub; Sleeves: Unisport; Shorts: Upplands Bilforum, Länsförsäkringar Uppsala, Elak AB, Team G El & VVS AB, Vaksala Måleri, ServeYou AB; Socks: None
Malmö FF	(Sweden) Anes Mravac	(Denmark) Anders Christiansen	(Germany) Puma	Oatly	List: Front: Oatly; Back: Tillmobil; Sleeves: Boozt; Shorts: None; Socks: None
Mjällby AIF	(Sweden) Anders Torstensson	(Sweden) Jesper Gustavsson	(Italy) Macron	Mellby Gård	List: Front: Kundpartner, Maxi ICA Stormarknad, Sölvesborg, Sydställningar, Enkla Elbolaget; Back: Järletoft Bygger; Sleeves: Falkeskog; Shorts: Säljfast, Volkswagen, Sölvesborg hjärta för bygden, SVB Industri, Mercedes-Benz Råbergs Bil, Extra Mjällby; Socks: None
Östers IF	(Sweden) Roberth Björknesjö	(Serbia) Ivan Kričak	(Sweden) Stadium	Emilshus	List: Front: Back: Sleeves: Shorts: Socks:

=== Managerial changes ===
Team	Outgoing manager	Manner of departure	Date of vacancy	Table	Incoming manager	Date of appointment
IF Brommapojkarna	(Sweden) Olof Mellberg	End of contract	26 November 2024	Pre-season	(Sweden) Ulf Kristiansson (Sweden) Fredrik Landén	3 December 2024
IF Brommapojkarna	(Sweden) Andreas Engelmark	End of contract	29 November 2024	Pre-season	(Sweden) Ulf Kristiansson (Sweden) Fredrik Landén	3 December 2024
IK Sirius	(Sweden) Christer Mattiasson	Sacked	1 December 2024	Pre-season	(Sweden) Andreas Engelmark	3 December 2024
IFK Norrköping	(Sweden) Andreas Alm	Sacked	9 December 2024	Pre-season	(Sweden) Martin Falk	21 December 2024
Djurgårdens IF	(Sweden) Roberth Björknesjö	End of interim spell	20 December 2024	Pre-season	(Finland) Jani Honkavaara	20 December 2024
BK Häcken	(Netherlands) Joop Oosterveld	End of interim spell	27 December 2024	Pre-season	(Sweden) Jens Gustafsson	27 December 2024
IFK Värnamo	(Spain) Ferran Sibila	Sacked	28 April 2025	16th	(Norway) Arne Sandstø	12 May 2025
Degerfors IF	(Sweden) William Lundin	Sacked	19 June 2025	11th	(Eritrea) Henok Goitom	9 July 2025
Östers IF	(England) Martin Foyston	Sacked	4 September 2025	14th	(Sweden) Roberth Björknesjö (interim)	4 September 2025
Malmö FF	(Sweden) Henrik Rydström	Sacked	26 September 2025	6th	(Sweden) Anes Mravac (interim)	26 September 2025

== League table ==
Pos	Team	Pld	W	D	L	GF	GA	GD	Pts	Qualification or relegation
1	Mjällby AIF (C)	30	23	6	1	57	18	+39	75	Qualification for the Champions League second qualifying round
2	Hammarby IF	30	19	5	6	60	29	+31	62	Qualification for the Europa League second qualifying round (Note: The 2025–26 Svenska Cupen winners qualifies for the Europa League second qualifying round. Since the cup winners (Mjällby AIF) qualified based on league position, the Europa League spot was passed to the second-placed team, and the second Conference League second qualifying round spot was passed to the fourth-placed team.)
3	GAIS	30	14	10	6	45	30	+15	52	Qualification for the Conference League second qualifying round
4	IFK Göteborg	30	16	3	11	41	33	+8	51	Qualification for the Conference League second qualifying round
5	Djurgårdens IF	30	13	10	7	52	32	+20	49	
6	Malmö FF	30	13	10	7	46	33	+13	49	
7	AIK	30	13	9	8	40	33	+7	48	
8	IF Elfsborg	30	12	4	14	45	51	−6	40	
9	IK Sirius	30	11	6	13	53	51	+2	39	
10	BK Häcken	30	9	8	13	42	50	−8	35	
11	Halmstads BK	30	10	5	15	24	50	−26	35	
12	IF Brommapojkarna	30	9	4	17	40	47	−7	31	
13	Degerfors IF	30	8	6	16	33	52	−19	30	
14	IFK Norrköping (R)	30	8	5	17	40	57	−17	29	Qualification for the Allsvenskan play-off
15	Östers IF (R)	30	6	8	16	29	48	−19	26	Relegation to Superettan
16	IFK Värnamo (R)	30	3	7	20	36	69	−33	16	Relegation to Superettan

Source: svenskfotboll.se (in Swedish)
Rules for classification: 1) Points; 2) Goal difference; 3) Goals scored; 4) Head-to-head points; 5) Head-to-head goal difference; 6) Head-to-head away goals scored; 7) Play-off
(Note: Play-off is only played if need to decide champion, teams for relegation or UEFA competition and will be played on a neutral ground).
(C) Champions; (R) Relegated

== Positions by round ==
Team ╲ Round	1	2	3	4	5	6	7	8	9	10	11	12	13	14	15	16	17	18	19	20	21	22	23	24	25	26	27	28	29	30
Mjällby AIF	8	11	6	3	3	2	1	3	2	1	3	1	2	2	1	1	1	1	1	1	1	1	1	1	1	1	1	1	1	1
Hammarby IF	2	1	1	2	2	3	3	2	3	4	4	2	1	1	2	2	2	2	2	2	2	2	2	2	2	2	2	2	2	2
GAIS	12	13	8	11	10	10	12	14	8	11	7	7	6	6	6	6	6	6	6	5	6	5	6	4	6	3	3	3	3	3
IFK Göteborg	15	10	5	10	6	7	10	11	12	10	6	6	7	7	7	7	8	7	7	7	7	6	4	5	4	5	6	4	5	4
Djurgårdens IF	12	9	12	12	9	6	6	6	6	7	9	9	8	8	10	9	7	8	8	8	8	8	8	7	7	6	7	5	6	5
Malmö FF	6	4	3	4	7	4	5	5	5	5	5	5	5	5	5	4	3	4	5	3	3	4	5	6	5	7	4	6	7	6
AIK	6	3	2	1	1	1	2	1	1	3	2	4	3	3	3	3	5	5	4	6	4	3	3	3	3	4	5	7	4	7
IF Elfsborg	9	12	7	5	4	5	4	4	4	2	1	3	4	4	4	5	4	3	3	4	5	7	7	8	8	8	8	8	8	8
IK Sirius	5	7	13	13	13	13	14	13	14	14	14	13	11	13	13	13	14	13	13	12	12	12	10	11	13	11	12	10	9	9
BK Häcken	3	7	13	9	12	12	9	10	9	6	8	8	10	9	8	8	9	10	10	10	9	10	11	12	10	9	9	9	10	10
Halmstads BK	16	16	15	15	15	14	13	12	13	13	13	12	14	11	11	12	12	12	12	14	13	13	13	13	12	13	10	11	11	11
IF Brommapojkarna	14	15	10	8	8	11	8	8	11	12	12	15	12	10	9	10	10	9	9	9	11	9	9	9	9	10	11	12	12	12
Degerfors IF	1	1	4	6	5	9	7	9	7	9	11	11	13	14	14	14	13	15	15	15	15	15	15	15	15	15	15	14	14	13
IFK Norrköping	4	6	11	7	11	8	11	7	10	8	10	10	9	12	12	11	11	11	11	11	10	11	12	10	11	12	13	13	13	14
Östers IF	10	5	9	14	14	15	15	15	15	15	15	14	15	15	15	15	15	14	14	13	14	14	14	14	14	14	14	15	15	15
IFK Värnamo	11	14	16	16	16	16	16	16	16	16	16	16	16	16	16	16	16	16	16	16	16	16	16	16	16	16	16	16	16	16

Leader and 2026–27 UEFA Champions League second qualifying round
2026–27 UEFA Conference League second qualifying round
Allsvenskan play-off
Relegation to 2026 Superettan

Updated to match(es) played on 9 November 2025. Source: everysport.com

== Results by round ==
Team ╲ Round	1	2	3	4	5	6	7	8	9	10	11	12	13	14	15	16	17	18	19	20	21	22	23	24	25	26	27	28	29	30
AIK	W	W	D	W	W	W	D	W	D	D	W	L	W	L	W	L	D	D	D	L	W	W	W	L	D	L	L	D	W	L
BK Häcken	W	L	L	W	L	D	W	L	D	W	D	L	L	W	W	D	L	L	D	L	W	L	L	L	W	W	D	D	D	L
Degerfors IF	W	W	L	L	W	L	D	L	W	L	L	L	L	L	L	L	D	L	D	L	L	D	L	W	W	D	L	W	D	W
Djurgårdens IF	L	W	L	D	W	W	D	W	L	L	D	L	D	W	L	W	W	D	D	D	W	W	D	W	W	D	L	W	D	W
GAIS	L	D	W	D	D	D	L	D	W	D	W	W	W	D	W	W	W	D	L	W	L	W	L	W	D	W	W	W	D	L
Halmstads BK	L	L	W	L	L	D	W	W	L	L	L	W	L	W	L	D	L	D	L	L	W	L	D	W	W	L	W	L	D	W
Hammarby IF	W	W	W	L	W	D	W	D	W	W	W	W	W	W	L	W	W	L	W	L	L	W	D	W	L	W	W	W	D	W
IF Brommapojkarna	L	L	W	W	D	L	W	L	L	L	L	L	W	W	W	L	L	W	D	L	L	W	L	W	L	L	D	L	D	L
IF Elfsborg	D	L	W	W	W	L	W	W	W	W	W	L	D	L	W	L	W	W	D	L	L	L	D	L	L	L	W	L	L	L
IFK Göteborg	L	W	W	L	W	D	L	L	L	W	W	W	L	W	L	W	L	W	W	W	D	W	W	L	W	L	L	W	D	W
IFK Norrköping	W	L	L	W	L	W	L	D	L	W	D	L	D	L	L	W	D	L	L	W	W	L	D	W	L	L	L	L	L	L
IFK Värnamo	L	L	L	L	L	L	L	D	D	L	D	L	D	L	W	L	L	D	D	W	L	L	L	L	L	W	D	L	L	L
IK Sirius	W	L	L	D	L	D	D	W	L	L	L	W	D	L	L	L	L	D	W	W	W	L	W	L	L	W	D	W	W	W
Malmö FF	W	W	D	D	L	W	L	W	D	D	L	W	D	D	W	W	W	D	L	W	D	D	D	L	W	L	W	L	D	W
Mjällby AIF	D	D	W	W	W	W	W	L	W	W	D	W	D	W	W	W	W	W	W	D	W	W	W	D	W	W	W	W	W	W
Östers IF	L	W	L	L	L	L	L	L	W	D	D	W	D	L	L	L	D	D	D	W	L	L	W	D	L	W	L	L	D	L

Updated to match(es) played on 9 November 2025. Source: Soccerstats.com (in English)
W = Win; D = Draw; L = Lose; P = Postponed

== Results ==
Home \ Away	AIK	BKH	DEG	DIF	GAIS	HBK	HAM	BP	IFE	IFKG	IFKN	IFKV	IKS	MFF	MAIF	ÖIF
AIK		2–2	3–0	0–0	1–1	0–2	0–0	2–1	2–0	3–0	4–3	2–3	2–1	0–0	2–1	0–0
BK Häcken	3–3		3–4	1–6	1–3	4–1	1–1	2–0	1–2	1–2	2–0	2–0	1–1	1–1	0–3	0–2
Degerfors IF	0–1	0–0		1–1	0–3	0–1	1–1	0–3	0–1	1–3	0–0	1–0	1–1	1–4	0–1	1–2
Djurgårdens IF	1–1	1–1	5–1		0–0	1–1	3–3	1–0	1–0	0–0	1–1	6–2	8–2	0–1	1–3	1–0
GAIS	0–1	2–1	2–0	3–2		3–0	3–2	1–1	2–0	0–1	2–1	1–1	2–1	0–0	0–2	1–1
Halmstads BK	2–0	0–0	0–5	1–0	1–3		1–0	0–0	1–4	0–3	1–1	4–2	0–1	0–4	1–3	1–0
Hammarby IF	2–1	4–0	1–0	2–0	1–2	2–0		3–2	3–0	4–0	1–1	1–0	3–2	2–0	1–2	4–0
IF Brommapojkarna	0–1	1–3	1–3	0–1	0–2	0–1	0–2		3–0	1–3	6–4	3–2	2–4	2–3	0–1	2–0
IF Elfsborg	0–3	0–2	1–2	4–0	2–0	1–2	0–2	4–3		4–3	2–0	2–2	4–3	2–2	2–2	5–1
IFK Göteborg	2–1	2–3	3–0	1–2	1–1	1–0	1–2	0–1	1–2		2–0	1–0	3–1	1–0	0–2	0–1
IFK Norrköping	3–1	0–2	1–2	0–4	0–3	3–0	0–2	0–1	2–1	2–3		3–1	1–2	0–2	1–1	4–3
IFK Värnamo	1–2	1–5	3–2	1–0	2–2	1–2	2–3	1–1	0–0	0–1	1–3		1–2	2–2	0–5	1–1
IK Sirius	3–1	2–0	1–3	0–1	3–0	1–1	3–1	0–3	4–0	0–1	1–2	3–1		5–1	1–2	1–1
Malmö FF	0–0	3–0	1–1	0–1	2–1	3–0	1–3	1–2	2–1	0–0	3–1	3–2	1–1		1–3	2–0
Mjällby AIF	2–0	1–0	4–1	1–1	1–1	1–0	3–1	1–0	2–0	1–0	2–1	2–0	2–1	1–1		1–1
Östers IF	0–1	2–0	1–2	1–3	1–1	3–0	0–3	1–1	0–1	0–2	1–2	4–3	2–2	0–2	0–1	

Source: Svenskfotboll.se
Legend: Blue = home team win; Yellow = draw; Red = away team win.
For upcoming matches, an "a" indicates there is an article about the rivalry between the two participants.

== Allsvenskan play-off ==
The 14th-placed team of Allsvenskan will meet the third-placed team from 2025 Superettan in a two-legged tie on a home-and-away basis with the team from Allsvenskan finishing at home.

22 November 2025
15:00

Örgryte IS	3–0	IFK Norrköping
Paulson 10'; Christofferson 43', 66'	Report

Gamla Ullevi, Gothenburg
Attendance: 11,094
Referee: Mohammed Al-Hakim
29 November 2025
15:00

IFK Norrköping	0–0	Örgryte IS
	Report

Nya Parken, Norrköping
Attendance: 10,306
Referee: Fredrik Klitte

Örgryte IS won 3–0 on aggregate.

== Season statistics ==
=== Top scorers ===
As of 9 November 2025

Rank	Player	Club	Goals
1	(Ivory Coast) Ibrahim Diabate	GAIS	18
1	(Denmark) August Priske	Djurgårdens IF	18
3	(Sweden) Nahir Besara	Hammarby IF	17
4	(Finland) Leo Walta	IK Sirius	16
5	(Denmark) Max Fenger	IFK Göteborg	12
6	(Sweden) Christoffer Nyman	IFK Norrköping	11
6	(Scotland) Robbie Ure	IK Sirius	11
8	(Denmark) Victor Lind	IF Brommapojkarna	10
8	(Sweden) Elliot Stroud	Mjällby AIF	10
10	(Norway) Tokmac Nguen	Djurgårdens IF	9

=== Hat-tricks ===
Player	For	Against	Result	Date
(Palestine) Omar Faraj (5)	Degerfors IF	Halmstads BK	5–0	30 March 2025
(The Gambia) Abdoulie Manneh	Mjällby AIF	Degerfors IF	4–1	27 April 2025
(Ivory Coast) Ibrahim Diabate	GAIS	Halmstads BK	3–1	14 May 2025
(Denmark) Frederik Ihler	IF Elfsborg	Djurgårdens IF	4–0	19 May 2025
(Norway) Tokmac Nguen	Djurgårdens IF	Degerfors IF	5–1	6 July 2025
(Denmark) Victor Lind	IF Brommapojkarna	IFK Norrköping	6–4	2 August 2025
(Finland) Kai Meriluoto	IFK Värnamo	Östers IF	3–4	14 September 2025
(Denmark) August Priske	Djurgårdens IF	IK Sirius	8–2	29 September 2025
(Sweden) Elliot Stroud	Mjällby AIF	IFK Värnamo	5–0	3 November 2025

=== Discipline ===
==== Player ====
- Most yellow cards: 11
  - (Bosnia and Herzegovina) Dino Beširović, AIK
- Most red cards: 1
  - Eight players tied

==== Club ====
- Most yellow cards:
- Most red cards:

== Awards ==
=== Allsvenskans Stora Pris ===
For the thirteenth year running, the broadcaster of Allsvenskan, HBO Max, hosted an award ceremony where they presented seven awards and two special awards to the players and staff of the 16 Allsvenskan clubs. The award ceremony was held on 19 November 2025. The nominations for the 2025 season were officially announced on 14 November 2025. Nominees are displayed below, with the winners marked in bold text.

Goalkeeper of the year

- **Noel Törnqvist** (Mjällby AIF)
- Elis Bishesari (IFK Göteborg)
- Warner Hahn (Hammarby IF)

Defender of the year

- **Elliot Stroud** (Mjällby AIF)
- Victor Eriksson (Hammarby IF)
- Herman Johansson (Mjällby AIF)

Midfielder of the year

- **Nahir Besara** (Hammarby IF)
- Gustav Lundgren (GAIS)
- Leo Walta (IK Sirius)

Forward of the year

- **August Priske** (Djurgårdens IF)
- Ibrahim Diabate (GAIS)
- Abdoulaie Manneh (Mjällby AIF)

Newcomer of the year

- **Noah Tolf** (IFK Göteborg)
- Bleon Kurtulus (Halmstads BK)
- Ludwig Malachowski Thorell (Mjällby AIF)

Manager of the year

- **Anders Torstensson** (Mjällby AIF)
- Kim Hellberg (Hammarby IF)
- Fredrik Holmberg (GAIS)

Best player of the year

- **Nahir Besara** (Hammarby IF)
- Herman Johansson (Mjällby AIF)
- Noel Törnqvist (Mjällby AIF)

=== Monthly awards ===
The Player of the Month award is presented six times per year. The jury consists of 16 team captains and head coaches, along with sports journalists from national and local media in the regions where Allsvenskan is played. Each month, the jury selects five finalists, after which supporters vote to determine the winner among them.

Month	Player of the Month		Coach of the Month		References
Month	Player	Club	Coach	Club	References
April	(Sweden) Christoffer Nyman	IFK Norrköping	(Sweden) Anders Torstensson	Mjällby AIF	
May	(Ivory Coast) Ibrahim Diabate	GAIS	(Sweden) Anders Torstensson	Mjällby AIF	
July	(Ivory Coast) Ibrahim Diabate	GAIS	(Sweden) Fredrik Holmberg	GAIS	
August	(Sweden) Nahir Besara	Hammarby IF	(Sweden) Anders Torstensson	Mjällby AIF	
September	(Denmark) August Priske	Djurgårdens IF	(Finland) Jani Honkavaara	Djurgårdens IF	
October	(Sweden) Tom Pettersson	Mjällby AIF	(Sweden) Anders Torstensson	Mjällby AIF	

== Attendances ==
No.	Club	Average attendance	Change	Highest
1	AIK	30,024	5,0%	47,727
2	Hammarby IF	24,297	3,0%	30,217
3	Djurgårdens IF	19,400	0,3%	28,785
4	Malmö FF	18,663	-7,9%	21,269
5	IFK Göteborg	16,615	-1,4%	18,021
6	GAIS	10,431	15,8%	18,078
7	IF Elfsborg	8,852	6,4%	14,304
8	IFK Norrköping	8,259	2,3%	14,465
9	Östers IF	7,236	85,4%	11,685
10	IK Sirius FK	6,743	-4,1%	10,135
11	Halmstads BK	5,706	-9,2%	9,776
12	Mjällby AIF	5,099	37,4%	5,982
13	BK Häcken	4,806	-3,4%	6,316
14	Degerfors IF	4,455	36,8%	6,361
15	IFK Värnamo	2,896	25,7%	4,465
16	IF Brommapojkarna	2,242	18,2%	4,254

== See also ==
Competitions

- 2025 Superettan
- 2025 Ettan
- 2024–25 Svenska Cupen
- 2025–26 Svenska Cupen

Team seasons

- 2025 Djurgårdens IF season
- 2025 IFK Göteborg season
- 2025 Malmö FF season
