= 2025–26 Svenska Cupen =

2025–2026 Svenska Cupen
Tournament details
- Country: Sweden
- Dates: 7 May 2025 – 14 May 2026
- Teams: 96

Final positions
- Champions: Mjällby AIF
- Runners-up: Hammarby IF

The 2025–26 Svenska Cupen was the 70th season of the Svenska Cupen and the 14th season in the current format. The winners will qualify for the first qualifying round of the 2026–27 UEFA Europa League. A total of 96 clubs will compete in the competition, 64 teams from district sites and 32 from the Allsvenskan and the Superettan.

Mjällby AIF won the Double but they weren't able to get to the 2026-27 UEFA Europa League because Hammarby IF finished 2nd and were in the Europa League

== Round dates ==
The schedule of the competition is as follows.

Phase	Round	Match date
Initial rounds	Round 1	7 May – 6 July 2025
Initial rounds	Round 2	19–21 August 2025
Group stage	Matchday 1	20–23 February 2026
Group stage	Matchday 2	27 February – 2 March 2026
Group stage	Matchday 3	7–9 March 2026
Knockout stage	Quarter-final	15 March 2026
Knockout stage	Semi-final	22 March 2026
Knockout stage	Final	14 May 2026

== Round 1 ==
The first round draw was held on 11 April 2025. 64 teams from the third tier or lower of the Swedish league system competed in this round.

Home team	Score	Away team	Date
IF Viken	0–4	IF Karlstad	7 May 2025
Öckerö IF	2–0 (a.e.t.)	FC Trollhättan	7 May 2025
Enköpings SK	4–2	Vasalunds IF	14 May 2025
IF Sylvia	2–0	Arameisk-Syrianska IF	14 May 2025
Dvärsätts BK	1–4	Kubikenborgs IF	21 May 2025
IFK Berga	1–3	Sölvesborgs GoIF	27 May 2025
Karlslunds IF FK	0–1	FBK Karlstad	3 June 2025
IF Lödde	4–3 (a.e.t.)	FC Rosengård 1917	4 June 2025
FBK Balkan	0–3	Lunds BK	9 June 2025
Laholms FK	0–2	Eskilsminne IF	10 June 2025
Onsala BK	4–2	Lindome GIF	10 June 2025
Jönköping Torpa BK	0–3	IFK Skövde	10 June 2025
IF Centern	2–2 (4–2 p)	Högaborgs BK	11 June 2025
Gimo IF FK	2–3	IFK Haninge	11 June 2025
Täby FK	2–1	FC Arlanda	11 June 2025
Eslövs BK	0–3	BK Olympic	15 June 2025
Korsnäs IF	1–0	Gefle IF	18 June 2025
Assyriska FF	2–0	Sollentuna FK	18 June 2025
Viggbyholms IK FF	3–2	FC Gute	22 June 2025
IK Gauthiod	2–3 (a.e.t.)	IK Zenith	24 June 2025
FC Järfälla	5–1	IK Franke	24 June 2025
IFK Stocksund	0–5	Karlbergs BK	24 June 2025
IFK Tidaholm	0–3	Nässjö FF	24 June 2025
Räppe GoIF	1–0	Kristianstad FC	24 June 2025
FoC Farsta	1–2 (a.e.t.)	FC Stockholm Internazionale	25 June 2025
Ursvik IK	2–3	Syrianska FC	25 June 2025
Torstorps IF	2–1	Hjulsbro IK	27 June 2025
Piteå IF	5–1	Skellefteå FF	29 June 2025
Stenungsunds IF	1–2	Qviding FIF	30 June 2025
Hudiksvalls FF	2–2 (4–1 p)	Friska Viljor FC	1 July 2025
Västboås GoIF	0–2	Myresjö/Vetlanda FK	1 July 2025
Vänersborgs FK	1–1 (4–2 p)	Torslanda IK	1 July 2025

== Round 2 ==
The draw was made on 8 July 2025.

Home team	Score	Away team	Date
FC Järfälla	1–4	Djurgårdens IF	13 August 2025
IK Zenith	1–2	Örgryte IS	19 August 2025
Karlbergs BK	2–3 (a.e.t.)	IK Brage	19 August 2025
IFK Skövde	3–2	Utsiktens BK	19 August 2025
Sölvesborgs GIF	0–2	Falkenbergs FF	19 August 2025
Täby FK	0–0 (3–5 p)	Östersunds FK	19 August 2025
Kubikenborgs IF	0–1	Västerås SK	19 August 2025
IF Karlstad	2–1	Umeå FC	19 August 2025
Viggbyholms IK	0–3	IFK Norrköping	19 August 2025
Eskilsminne IF	1–2	Varbergs BoIS	19 August 2025
FBK Karlstad	0–6	IK Oddevold	20 August 2025
Onsala BK	1–2 (a.e.t.)	Mjällby AIF	20 August 2025
Hudiksvalls FF	0–7	AIK	20 August 2025
Torstorps IF	0–2	GIF Sundsvall	20 August 2025
Piteå IF FF	0–5	IK Sirius	20 August 2025
IFK Haninge	0–1	IF Elfsborg	20 August 2025
Korsnäs IF	0–3	Hammarby IF	20 August 2025
Öckerö IF	1–3	Landskrona BoIS	20 August 2025
Lunds BK	2–3	Trelleborgs FF	20 August 2025
IF Sylvia	0–5	Kalmar FF	20 August 2025
Vänersborgs FK	0–1	Helsingborgs IF	20 August 2025
Qviding FIF	0–4	IFK Göteborg	20 August 2025
Myresjö-Vetlanda FK	1–4	Halmstads BK	21 August 2025
IF Lödde	1–3	GAIS	21 August 2025
FC Stockholm Internazionale	0–2	IF Brommapojkarna	21 August 2025
Assyriska FF	0–1	Sandvikens IF	21 August 2025
Enköpings SK	1–2	Degerfors IF	21 August 2025
IF Centern	1–3	IFK Värnamo	21 August 2025
Räppe GOIF	1–5	Östers IF	9 September 2025
Syrianska FC	0–2	Örebro SK	9 September 2025
Nässjö FF	0–8	BK Häcken	11 September 2025
BK Olympic	0–1	Malmö FF	17 September 2025

== Group stage ==
The draw date and schedule for the group stage is to be announced.

=== Group 1 ===
Pos	Team	Pld	W	D	L	GF	GA	GD	Pts	Qualification	MAIF	KFF	ÖIS	IFKV
1	Mjällby AIF	3	3	0	0	7	1	+6	9	Advance to Knockout stage		2–0		2–1
2	Kalmar FF	3	1	1	1	4	5	−1	4				2–2	
3	Örgryte IS	3	0	2	1	4	7	−3	2		0–2			
4	IFK Värnamo	3	0	1	2	4	6	−2	1			1–2	2–2	

Source: SvFF
Rules for classification: 1) Points; 2) Goal difference; 3) Goals scored; 4) Head-to-head record; 5) Lowest disciplinary points; 6) Highest ranked team

=== Group 2 ===
Pos	Team	Pld	W	D	L	GF	GA	GD	Pts	Qualification	HAM	ÖIF	IKB	ÖSK
1	Hammarby IF	3	3	0	0	14	3	+11	9	Advance to Knockout stage		7–0	2–0	
2	Östers IF	3	1	1	1	7	11	−4	4				4–1	3–3
3	IK Brage	3	1	0	2	3	7	−4	3					2–1
4	Örebro SK	3	0	1	2	7	10	−3	1		3–5			

Source: SvFF
Rules for classification: 1) Points; 2) Goal difference; 3) Goals scored; 4) Head-to-head record; 5) Lowest disciplinary points; 6) Highest ranked team

=== Group 3 ===
Pos	Team	Pld	W	D	L	GF	GA	GD	Pts	Qualification	GAIS	IFKN	LAN	SIF
1	GAIS	3	3	0	0	11	3	+8	9	Advance to Knockout stage		5–1	3–0	
2	IFK Norrköping	3	2	0	1	5	5	0	6				2–0	2–0
3	Landskrona BoIS	3	1	0	2	3	7	−4	3					3–2
4	Sandvikens IF	3	0	0	3	4	8	−4	0		2–3			

Source: SvFF
Rules for classification: 1) Points; 2) Goal difference; 3) Goals scored; 4) Head-to-head record; 5) Lowest disciplinary points; 6) Highest ranked team

=== Group 4 ===
Pos	Team	Pld	W	D	L	GF	GA	GD	Pts	Qualification	IFKG	ÖFK	DEG	TFF
1	IFK Göteborg	3	2	1	0	7	1	+6	7	Advance to Knockout stage		0–0	3–1	
2	Östersunds FK	3	1	2	0	4	1	+3	5					3–0
3	Degerfors IF	3	1	1	1	5	4	+1	4			1–1		3–0
4	Trelleborgs FF	3	0	0	3	0	10	−10	0		0–4			

Source: SvFF
Rules for classification: 1) Points; 2) Goal difference; 3) Goals scored; 4) Head-to-head record; 5) Lowest disciplinary points; 6) Highest ranked team

=== Group 5 ===
Pos	Team	Pld	W	D	L	GF	GA	GD	Pts	Qualification	DIF	BP	FFF	IFKS
1	Djurgårdens IF	3	2	0	1	10	2	+8	6	Advance to Knockout stage		2–0	0–2	
2	IF Brommapojkarna	3	2	0	1	7	3	+4	6				4–1	
3	Falkenbergs FF	3	2	0	1	6	6	0	6					3–2
4	IFK Skövde	3	0	0	3	2	14	−12	0		0–8	0–3		

Source: SvFF
Rules for classification: 1) Points; 2) Goal difference; 3) Goals scored; 4) Head-to-head record; 5) Lowest disciplinary points; 6) Highest ranked team

=== Group 6 ===
Pos	Team	Pld	W	D	L	GF	GA	GD	Pts	Qualification	MFF	HBK	VAR	KAR
1	Malmö FF	3	3	0	0	7	1	+6	9	Advance to Knockout stage		2–1	1–0	
2	Halmstads BK	3	2	0	1	3	2	+1	6				1–0	
3	Varbergs BoIS	3	1	0	2	2	2	0	3					2–0
4	IF Karlstad	3	0	0	3	0	7	−7	0		0–4	0–1		

Source: SvFF
Rules for classification: 1) Points; 2) Goal difference; 3) Goals scored; 4) Head-to-head record; 5) Lowest disciplinary points; 6) Highest ranked team

=== Group 7 ===
Pos	Team	Pld	W	D	L	GF	GA	GD	Pts	Qualification	AIK	BKH	VSK	IKO
1	AIK	3	2	0	1	7	2	+5	6	Advance to Knockout stage		4–0	0–2	
2	BK Häcken	3	2	0	1	6	6	0	6				4–1	2–1
3	Västerås SK	3	1	0	2	3	5	−2	3					0–1
4	IK Oddevold	3	1	0	2	2	5	−3	3		0–3			

Source: SvFF
Rules for classification: 1) Points; 2) Goal difference; 3) Goals scored; 4) Head-to-head record; 5) Lowest disciplinary points; 6) Highest ranked team

=== Group 8 ===
Pos	Team	Pld	W	D	L	GF	GA	GD	Pts	Qualification	IKS	IFE	HIF	GIF
1	IK Sirius	3	3	0	0	12	2	+10	9	Advance to Knockout stage			4–1	6–0
2	IF Elfsborg	3	2	0	1	6	2	+4	6		1–2		4–0	
3	Helsingborgs IF	3	0	1	2	2	9	−7	1					1–1
4	GIF Sundsvall	3	0	1	2	1	8	−7	1			0–1		

Source: SvFF
Rules for classification: 1) Points; 2) Goal difference; 3) Goals scored; 4) Head-to-head record; 5) Lowest disciplinary points; 6) Highest ranked team

== Knockout stage ==
The eight group winners from the group stage entered the knockout stage, beginning with the quarter-finals. The top four group winners overall were seeded in the quarter-final draw, each facing one of the bottom four group winners (unseeded in the draw) at home. The draw for the quarter-finals took place on 9 March.

=== Qualified teams ===
Pos	Grp	Team	Pld	W	D	L	GF	GA	GD	Pts	Qualification
1	2	Hammarby IF	3	3	0	0	14	3	+11	9	Seeded in quarter-final draw
2	8	IK Sirius	3	3	0	0	12	2	+10	9	Seeded in quarter-final draw
3	3	GAIS	3	3	0	0	11	3	+8	9	Seeded in quarter-final draw
4	1	Mjällby AIF	3	3	0	0	7	1	+6	9	Seeded in quarter-final draw
5	6	Malmö FF	3	3	0	0	7	1	+6	9	Unseeded in quarter-final draw
6	4	IFK Göteborg	3	2	1	0	7	1	+6	7	Unseeded in quarter-final draw
7	5	Djurgårdens IF	3	2	0	1	10	2	+8	6	Unseeded in quarter-final draw
8	7	AIK	3	2	0	1	7	2	+5	6	Unseeded in quarter-final draw

Updated to match(es) played on 9 March 2026. Source:
Rules for classification: 1) Points; 2) Goal difference; 3) Goals scored; 4) Head-to-head record; 5) Lowest disciplinary points; 6) Highest ranked team

=== Bracket ===
Quarter-finals
14 March 2026 – Hällevik
Mjällby AIF	4
Malmö FF	0
14 March 2026 – Gothenburg
GAIS	3
AIK	2
15 March 2026 – Stockholm
Hammarby IF	1
Djurgårdens IF	0
15 March 2026 – Uppsala
IK Sirius (a.e.t.)	1
IFK Göteborg	0

Semi-finals
22 March 2026 – Hällevik
Mjällby AIF	3
GAIS	0
22 March 2026 – Stockholm
Hammarby IF (p)	3 (4)
IK Sirius	3 (2)

Final
14 May 2026 – Solna
Mjällby AIF	2
Hammarby IF	1

=== Quarter-finals ===
14 March 2026	GAIS (1)	3–2	AIK (1)	Gothenburg
13:00 UTC+1	Holmén 4'; Niklasson Petrovic 77'; Ekong 90+2'	Report	Yohanna 63'; Hove 69'	Stadium: Nordic Wellness Arena; Attendance: 5,606; Referee: Mohammed Al-Hakim

14 March 2026	Mjällby AIF (1)	4–0	Malmö FF (1)	Hällevik
15:00 UTC+1	Stroud 17'; Bergström 27', 59'; Granath 63'	Report		Stadium: Strandvallen; Attendance: 3,978; Referee: Granit Maqedonci

15 March 2026	Hammarby IF (1)	1–0	Djurgårdens IF (1)	Stockholm
15:00 UTC+1	Abraham 90+1'	Report		Stadium: 3Arena; Attendance: 26,490; Referee: Joakim Sars See also: Djurgårdens IF Fotboll–Hammarby Fotboll rivalry

15 March 2026	IK Sirius (1)	1–0 (a.e.t.)	IFK Göteborg (1)	Uppsala
17:15 UTC+1	Bjerkebo 104'	Report		Stadium: Studenternas IP; Attendance: 6,620; Referee: Kristoffer Karlsson

=== Semi-finals ===
22 March 2026	Hammarby IF (1)	3–3 (a.e.t.) (4–2 p)	IK Sirius (1)	Stockholm
13:30 UTC+1	M. Karlsson 56'; Madjed 63'; Besara 105+1'	Report	Jönsson 22'; Ure 78'; Jo. Persson 97'	Stadium: 3Arena; Attendance: 27,135; Referee: Fredrik Klitte
	Penalties
	Vasić (penalty scored); Winther (penalty scored); Lindberg Uhrström (penalty scored); Johansson Schellhas (penalty scored)		(penalty missed) Soumah; (penalty scored) Heier; (penalty scored) Krusnell; (penalty missed) Lindberg

22 March 2026	Mjällby AIF (1)	3–0	GAIS (1)	Hällevik
16:00 UTC+1	Pettersson 31'; Stroud 45+1'; Bergström 55'	Report		Stadium: Strandvallen; Attendance: 4,107; Referee: Victor Wolf

=== Final ===
14 May 2026	Mjällby AIF (1)	2–1	Hammarby IF (1)	Solna
15:30 UTC+2	Stroud 19'; Bergström 45'	Report	Abraham 22'	Stadium: Nationalarenan; Attendance: 39,903; Referee: Granit Maqedonci
