= 2023 Hammarby Fotboll season =

Swedish football team

Hammarby Fotboll
2023 season
- Chairman: Mattias Fri
- Head coach: Martí Cifuentes (until 30 October); Ábel Lőrincz '(interim, from 31 October to 31 December)
- Stadium: Tele2 Arena
- Allsvenskan: 7th
- 2022–23 Svenska Cupen: Semi-final
- Conference League: Second qualifying round
- Top goalscorer: League: Viktor Đukanović (11); All: Viktor Đukanović (13)
- Highest home attendance: 30 941 (2 April vs Degerfors IF, Allsvenskan)
- Lowest home attendance: 17 318 (5 March vs GIF Sundsvall, Svenska Cupen)
Home colours	Away colours	Third colours

The 2023 season was Hammarby Fotboll's 108th in existence, their 54th season in Allsvenskan and their 9th consecutive season in the league. They competed in Allsvenskan and Svenska Cupen and the UEFA Europa Conference League. League play started in April and ended in November. Martí Cifuentes made his second season as head coach, before leaving with two fixtures left of the season.

== Summary ==
Ahead of the 2023 season, Hammarby sold several key players from the previous season, such as Gustav Ludwigson, Mohanad Jeahze and Darijan Bojanić. Forward Veton Berisha that had been signed during the summer of 2022, for a record breaking free, also left the club after just six months by returning to Norway.

On 17 May 2023, sporting director Jesper Jansson decided to step down and leave the club after six years. Mikael Hjelmberg, formerly head of scouting, was appointed as his permanent successor during the fall.

Hammarby had a tough first half of the season, being placed 8th in the table after 15 rounds. The side eventually picked up form and only lost one out of 12 league games between round 17 and 28. In the second qualifying round of the 2023–24 UEFA Europa Conference League, Hammarby lost 1–2 on aggregate, after extra time, to Dutch Eredivisie club FC Twente.

On 30 October 2023, with two fixtures left of the season, head coach Martí Cifuentes left the club with immediate effect after Hammarby had reached an agreement with Queens Park Rangers in the EFL Championship for his transfer. The following day, Ábel Lőrincz, the club's data analyst, was announced as caretaker for the rest of the year. Former Hammarby player Richard Magyar and coaching veteran Karl-Gunnar Björklund was also brought in as interim assistant coaches.

After ending the season with six straight draws, Hammarby finished on a 7th place in the Allsvenskan table.

== Players ==
=== Squad information ===
N	Pos.	Nat.	Name	Age	Since	App	Goals	Ends	Transfer fee	Notes
1	GK	(Sweden)	Oliver Dovin	24	2019	55	0	2026 (July)	Youth system	
2	DF	(Spain)	Marc Llinares	27	2023	11	0	2026 (July)	Free	
3	DF	(Sweden)	Anton Kralj	28	2023	11	0	2024	Free	
4	DF	(Sweden)	Edvin Kurtulus	26	2022	54	2	2025	Free	
5	MF	(Sweden)	Tesfaldet Tekie	29	2023	16	2	2026	Free	On loan to Apollon Limassol
7	FW	(Montenegro)	Viktor Đukanović	22	2023	25	11	2027	Undisclosed	
9	MF	(Bosnia and Herzegovina)	Adi Nalić	28	2023	26	4	2024	Free	
11	FW	(The Gambia)	Bubacarr Trawally	31	2022	12	2	2023	Undisclosed	
13	DF	(Denmark)	Mads Fenger	36	2017	158	6	2025	Free	
14	MF	(Sweden)	Dennis Collander	24	2022	5	0	2026 (July)	Undisclosed	
15	MF	(Sweden)	Pavle Vagić	26	2022	21	0	2026	Undisclosed	On loan to Helsingborgs IF
17	FW	(Norway)	August Mikkelsen	25	2023	21	0	2027	Undisclosed	
18	MF	(Kosovo)	Loret Sadiku	35	2022	45	1	2024	Free	
19	FW	(Sweden)	Jusef Erabi	23	2021	32	7	2024	Youth system	
20	MF	(Sweden)	Nahir Besara (captain)	35	2022	128	35	2025	Free	
21	DF	(Sweden)	Simon Strand	33	2023	26	0	2025	Undisclosed	
22	MF	(Sweden)	Joel Nilsson	32	2022	38	5	2023	Free	
23	DF	(Iceland)	Jón Guðni Fjóluson	37	2021	21	1	2023	Free	
25	GK	(Sweden)	Davor Blažević	33	2018	39	0	2025	Free	
27	GK	(Sweden)	Sebastian Selin	23	2022	0	0	2025	Undisclosed	
30	DF	(Suriname)	Shaquille Pinas	28	2022	38	0	2025	Undisclosed	
31	FW	(Cameroon)	Saidou Alioum	23	2023	1	0	2026	Undisclosed	On loan to AC Omonia
32	DF	(Ghana)	Nathaniel Adjei	24	2022	24	1	2026 (July)	Undisclosed	
33	MF	(Sweden)	Fredrik Hammar	25	2022	23	1	2027	Undisclosed	
34	MF	(Sweden)	Alper Demirol	23	2022	29	0	2024	Youth system	
35	DF	(Sweden)	Ludvig Svanberg	23	2022	0	0	2024	Youth system	On loan to GIF Sundsvall
36	DF	(Sweden)	Markus Karlsson	22	2022	19	1	2027	Youth system	
38	FW	(Sweden)	Montader Madjed	21	2022	16	1	2025 (July)	Undisclosed	
39	MF	(Turkey)	İsak Vural	20	2023	0	0	2025	Undisclosed	
40	FW	(Sweden)	Abdelrahman Boudah	27	2022	30	3	2026	Undisclosed	
45	MF	(Sweden)	Marcus Rafferty	21	2023	13	0	2027	Youth system	
46	FW	(Sweden)	Deniz Gül	22	2023	3	0	2025	Youth system	

- Last updated: 12 November 2023
- Source: Hammarby Fotboll
- Ordered by squad number.

=== Transfers ===
==== In ====
No.	Pos.	Nat.	Name	Age	Moving from	Type	Transfer window	Ends	Transfer fee	Source
	MF	(Niger)	Moustapha Amadou Sabo	18	Salitas FC (Burkina Faso)	Transfer	Winter	2027 (July)	Undisclosed	hammarbyfotboll.se
31	FW	(Cameroon)	Saidou Alioum	19	Sahel FC (Cameroon)	Transfer	Winter	2026	Undisclosed	hammarbyfotboll.se
48	MF	(Guinea)	Ibrahima Breze Fofana	20	Hammarby TFF	Bosman	Winter	2026	Free	hammarbyfotboll.se
7	FW	(Montenegro)	Viktor Đukanović	18	Budućnost Podgorica (Montenegro)	Transfer	Winter	2027	Undisclosed	hammarbyfotboll.se
9	MF	(Bosnia and Herzegovina)	Adi Nalić	25	Malmö FF	Bosman	Winter	2024	Free	hammarbyfotboll.se
17	FW	(Norway)	August Mikkelsen	22	Tromsø (Norway)	Transfer	Winter	2027	Undisclosed	hammarbyfotboll.se
39	MF	(Turkey)	İsak Vural	16	Fenerbahçe (Turkey)	Loan	Winter	2023	Loan	hammarbyfotboll.se
5	MF	(Sweden)	Tesfaldet Tekie	25	Go Ahead Eagles (Netherlands)	Bosman	Winter	2026	Free	hammarbyfotboll.se
21	DF	(Sweden)	Simon Strand	29	IF Elfsborg	Transfer	Winter	2025	Undisclosed	hammarbyfotboll.se
3	DF	(Sweden)	Anton Kralj	24	Degerfors IF	Bosman	Winter	2023 (July)	Free	hammarbyfotboll.se
39	MF	(Turkey)	İsak Vural	17	Fenerbahçe (Turkey)	Transfer	Winter	2025	Undisclosed	hammarbyfotboll.se
2	DF	(Spain)	Marc Llinares	23	Albacete (Spain)	Bosman	Summer	2026 (July)	Free	hammarbyfotboll.se

==== Out ====
No.	Pos.	Nat.	Name	Age	Moving to	Type	Transfer window	Transfer fee	Source
6	MF	(Sweden)	Darijan Bojanić	27	(South Korea) Ulsan Hyundai	Transfer	Winter	Undisclosed	hammarbyfotboll.se
4	DF	(Sweden)	Richard Magyar	31	Retired	End of contract	Winter		hammarbyfotboll.se
5	DF	(Sweden)	Mohanad Jeahze	25	(United States) D.C. United	Transfer	Winter	Undisclosed	hammarbyfotboll.se
26	DF	(Sweden)	Kalle Björklund	23	Free transfer	End of contract	Winter	Free	
2	DF	(Sweden)	Simon Sandberg	28	Free transfer	End of contract	Winter	Free	hammarbyfotboll.se
16	FW	(Sweden)	Gustav Ludwigson	29	(South Korea) Ulsan Hyundai	Transfer	Winter	Undisclosed	hammarbyfotboll.se
8	MF	(Denmark)	Jeppe Andersen	30	(Norway) Sarpsborg 08	Transfer	Winter	Undisclosed	hammarbyfotboll.se
9	FW	(Norway)	Veton Berisha	28	(Norway) Molde	Transfer	Winter	Undisclosed	hammarbyfotboll.se
17	MF	(Spain)	David Concha	26	Retired	End of contract	Winter		hammarbyfotboll.se
29	FW	(Ivory Coast)	Bayéré Junior Loué	22	(Turkey) Göztepe S.K.	Loan	Winter	Loan	hammarbyfotboll.se
35	DF	(Sweden)	Ludvig Svanberg	20	GIF Sundsvall	Loan	Summer	Loan	hammarbyfotboll.se
15	MF	(Sweden)	Pavle Vagić	23	Helsingborgs IF	Loan	Summer	Loan	hammarbyfotboll.se
15	FW	(Ivory Coast)	Bayéré Junior Loué	22	(Serbia) Javor Ivanjica	Transfer	Summer	Undisclosed	fkjavor.com
5	MF	(Sweden)	Tesfaldet Tekie	26	(Cyprus) Apollon Limassol	Loan	Summer	Loan	hammarbyfotboll.se
31	FW	(Cameroon)	Saidou Alioum	20	(Cyprus) AC Omonia	Loan	Summer	Loan	hammarbyfotboll.se

== Player statistics ==
=== Appearances and goals ===
No.	Pos	Nat	Player	Total		Allsvenskan		2022–23 and 2023–24 Svenska Cupen		Conference League	
No.	Pos	Nat	Player	Apps	Goals	Apps	Goals	Apps	Goals	Apps	Goals
Goalkeepers
1	GK	(Sweden) SWE	Oliver Dovin	35	0	29	0	4	0	2	0
25	GK	(Sweden) SWE	Davor Blažević	4	0	1+1	0	2	0	0	0
27	GK	(Sweden) SWE	Sebastian Selin	0	0	0	0	0	0	0	0
Defenders
2	DF	(Spain) ESP	Marc Llinares	12	0	10+1	0	1	0	0	0
3	DF	(Sweden) SWE	Anton Kralj	12	0	2+9	0	0+1	0	0	0
4	DF	(Sweden) SWE	Edvin Kurtulus	34	1	27	0	4+2	1	1	0
13	DF	(Denmark) DEN	Mads Fenger	29	0	18+5	0	4	0	2	0
21	DF	(Sweden) SWE	Simon Strand	31	0	21+5	0	3	0	2	0
23	DF	(Iceland) ISL	Jón Guðni Fjóluson	0	0	0	0	0	0	0	0
30	DF	(Suriname) SUR	Shaquille Pinas	30	1	21+3	0	4	1	2	0
32	DF	(Ghana) GHA	Nathaniel Adjei	28	1	16+5	1	4+1	0	1+1	0
36	DF	(Sweden) SWE	Markus Karlsson	22	1	16+3	1	0+1	0	2	0
44	DF	(Sweden) SWE	Noah John	1	0	0+1	0	0	0	0	0
Midfielders
9	MF	(Bosnia and Herzegovina) BIH	Adi Nalić	28	4	15+11	4	0	0	1+1	0
14	MF	(Sweden) SWE	Dennis Collander	0	0	0	0	0	0	0	0
18	MF	(Kosovo) KOS	Loret Sadiku	31	1	19+5	1	5	0	2	0
20	MF	(Sweden) SWE	Nahir Besara	35	12	29	9	4	3	2	0
22	MF	(Sweden) SWE	Joel Nilsson	23	1	7+9	0	6	1	0+1	0
33	MF	(Sweden) SWE	Fredrik Hammar	29	1	18+4	1	3+2	0	2	0
34	MF	(Sweden) SWE	Alper Demirol	23	0	10+6	0	1+5	0	0+1	0
39	MF	(Turkey) TUR	İsak Vural	0	0	0	0	0	0	0	0
45	MF	(Sweden) SWE	Marcus Rafferty	16	1	0+13	0	1	1	0+2	0
Forwards
7	FW	(Montenegro) MNE	Viktor Đukanović	33	13	15+10	11	5+1	2	1+1	0
11	FW	(The Gambia) GAM	Bubacarr Trawally	3	0	2+1	0	0	0	0	0
17	FW	(Norway) NOR	August Mikkelsen	24	0	11+10	0	2	0	0+1	0
19	FW	(Sweden) SWE	Jusef Erabi	30	12	13+10	7	3+2	4	2	1
38	FW	(Sweden) SWE	Montader Madjed	21	5	7+9	1	1+4	4	0	0
40	FW	(Sweden) SWE	Abdelrahman Boudah	17	1	7+6	0	4	1	0	0
46	FW	(Sweden) SWE	Deniz Gül	4	0	2+1	0	0+1	0	0	0
Players transferred/loaned out during the season
5	MF	(Sweden) SWE	Tesfaldet Tekie	21	3	13+3	2	4+1	1	0	0
15	MF	(Sweden) SWE	Pavle Vagić	12	0	1+8	0	0+3	0	0	0
31	FW	(Cameroon) CMR	Saidou Alioum	5	0	0+1	0	0+4	0	0	0
35	DF	(Sweden) SWE	Ludvig Svanberg	1	0	0	0	1	0	0	0

Last updated: 12 November 2023
Source: svenskfotboll.se

== Club ==
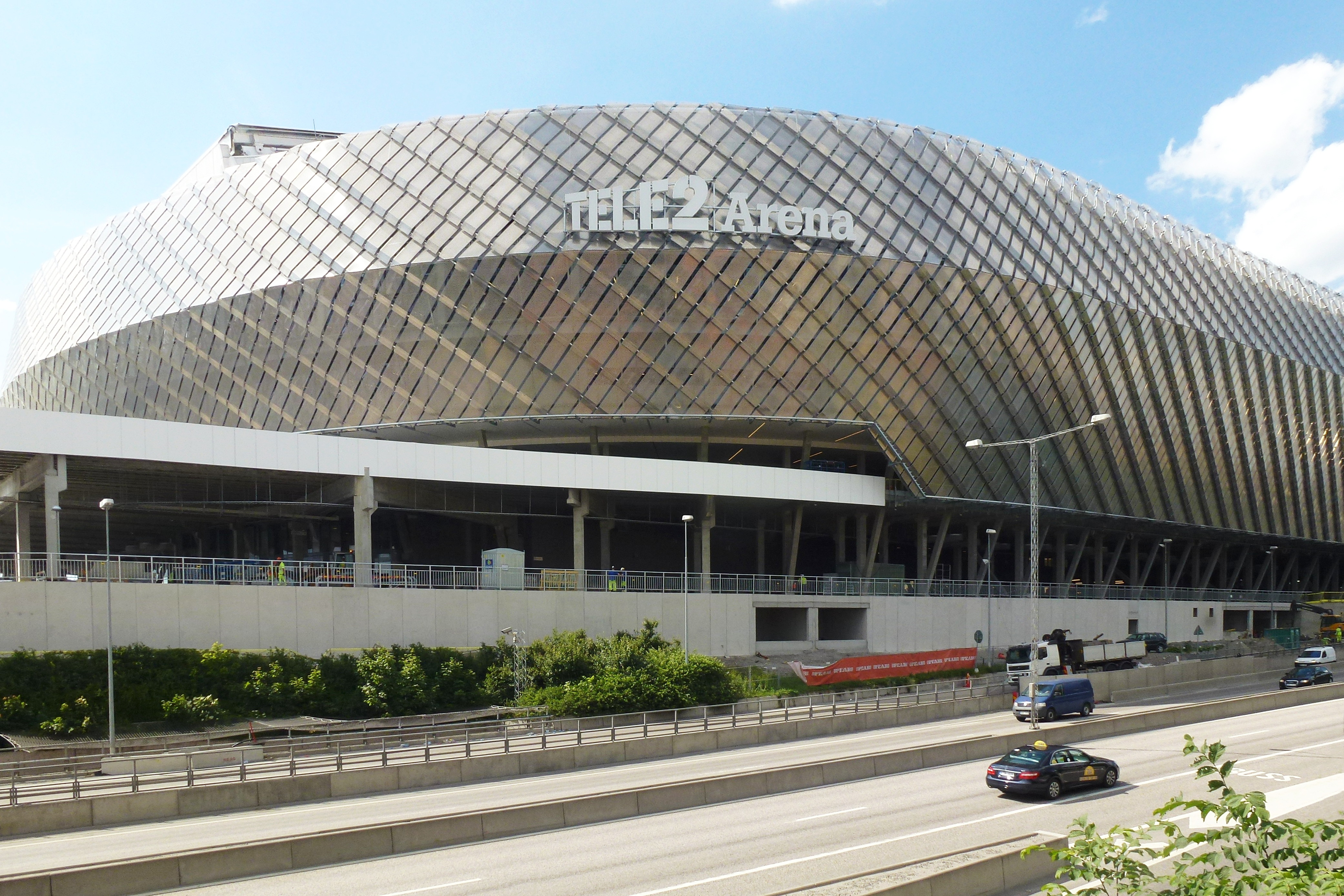
Tele2 Arena is the second largest stadium in Allsvenskan.

== Technical staff ==
Position	Staff
Head coach	(Hungary) Ábel Lőrincz (interim)
Assistant coaches	(Sweden) Richard Magyar (interim)
Assistant coaches	(Sweden) Karl-Gunnar Björklund (interim)
Fitness coach	(England) Perry Wild
Goalkeeper coach	(Sweden) Mikael "Mille" Olsson
Team administrators	(Sweden) Atena Gerontidou
Team administrators	(Sweden) Wadda Tamimi
Equipment manager	(Sweden) Anders Bitén
Physios	(Sweden) Magnus Svärd
Physios	(Sweden) Ludvig Axelsson
U19 head coach	(Sweden) Amin Faily
U17 head coach	(Sweden) Daniel Erlandsson
U19 and U17 goalkeeper coach	(Sweden) Gustav Scheutz Dahlström

=== Other information ===
Chairman	(Sweden) Mattias Fri
Managing director	(Sweden) Richard von Yxkull
Director of football	(Sweden) Mikael Hjelmberg
Technical director	(Sweden) Adrian von Heijne
Ground (capacity and dimensions)	Tele2 Arena (33,000 / )

== Pre-season and friendlies ==
=== Friendlies ===
20 January 2023 Friendly	Hammarby IF	4–3	Sandvikens IF	Stockholm
17:30	Erabi 21'; Vagić (yellow card) 41'; Besara 51' (pen.), 73'; Gül 76'	Report	Igbarumah 13'; Alsalkhadi 42', 45+1'; Söderberg (red card) 51'; Harletun (yellow card) 69'	Stadium: Hammarby IP; Attendance: 2 638; Referee: Glenn Nyberg

28 January 2023 Friendly	Seattle Sounders FC (United States)	2–3	(Sweden) Hammarby IF	Marbella, Spain
16:00	Montero 39'; Minoungou 72'	Report	Đukanović 45+1'; Erabi 57', 87'	Stadium: Dama de Noche Football Pitches; Attendance: 0 (Behind closed doors)

2 February 2023 Friendly	Hammarby IF (Sweden)	2–2	(South Korea) Jeonbuk Hyundai	Marbella, Spain
16:00	Đukanović 50'; Svanberg (yellow card) 53'; Besara 64'	Report	Min-kyu 19'; Seong-ung 57'	Stadium: La Quinta Football Fields

4 February 2023 Friendly	Hammarby IF (Sweden)	3–5	(Norway) SK Brann	Marbella, Spain
16:00	Saidi 9'; Demirol 60'; Hammar (yellow card) 74'; Alioum 88'	Report	Finne 22', 39'; Heltne Nilsen 54'; Blomberg 63'; Rasmussen 65' (pen.)	Stadium: Dama de Noche Football Pitches

9 February 2023 Friendly	FC Dallas (United States)	1–0	(Sweden) Hammarby IF	Marbella, Spain
12:30	Twumasi (yellow card) 30'; Arriola 61'; Cerrillo (yellow card) 89'	Report	Fofana (yellow card) 14'	Stadium: Marbella Football Center

11 February 2023 Friendly	Hammarby IF (Sweden)	1–0	(Norway) Stabæk	Marbella, Spain
16:00	Besara 55'; Saidi (yellow card) 84'	Report	Pachonik (yellow card) 84'	Stadium: Dama de Noche Football Pitches

== Competitions ==
=== Allsvenskan ===
==== League table ====
Pos	Team	Pld	W	D	L	GF	GA	GD	Pts
5	IFK Värnamo	30	14	3	13	37	34	+3	45
6	Kalmar FF	30	13	6	11	35	40	−5	45
7	Hammarby IF	30	11	11	8	41	39	+2	44
8	IK Sirius	30	12	6	12	51	44	+7	42
9	IFK Norrköping	30	12	5	13	45	45	0	41

Source: svenskfotboll.se (in Swedish)
Rules for classification: 1) Points; 2) Goal difference; 3) Goals scored; 4) Head-to-head points; 5) Head-to-head goal difference; 6) Play-off
(Note: Play-off is only played if need to decide champion, teams for relegation or UEFA competition and will be played on a neutral ground).

==== Results summary ====
Overall								Home						Away					
Pld	W	D	L	GF	GA	GD	Pts	W	D	L	GF	GA	GD	W	D	L	GF	GA	GD
29	11	10	8	40	38	+2	43	8	5	2	28	20	+8	3	5	6	12	18	−6

Source: svenskfotboll.se (in Swedish)

==== Results by round ====
Round	1	2	3	4	5	6	7	8	9	10	11	12	13	14	15	16	17	18	19	20	21	22	23	24	25	26	27	28	29	30
Ground	H	A	A	H	A	A	H	H	A	H	A	H	A	A	H	A	H	A	H	A	A	H	H	A	H	H	A	H	A	H
Result	W	L	L	W	L	L	D	W	D	L	D	W	L	W	W	L	W	D	W	D	W	W	L	W	D	D	D	D	D	D
Position	2	7	12	8	8	10	11	9	10	11	11	10	11	10	8	10	8	8	7	6	6	5	5	5	5	5	7	6	6	7

Source: see below
A = Away; H = Home; W = Win; D = Draw; L = Loss

==== Matches ====
Kickoff times are in (UTC+01) unless stated otherwise.

2 April 2023 Round 1	Hammarby IF	3–1	Degerfors IF	Stockholm
15:00	Besara 22'; Đukanović 60'; Korac 61' (o.g.)	Report	Gravius 28', (yellow card) 43'; Pavlović (yellow card) 73'	Stadium: Tele2 Arena; Attendance: 30 941; Referee: Granit Maqedonci

9 April 2023 Round 2	BK Häcken	3–1	Hammarby IF	Gothenburg
15:00	Traoré 5', 16', 45+1'; Romeo (yellow card) 28'	Report	Tekie 56'; Fenger (yellow card) 62'	Stadium: Bravida Arena; Attendance: 6 316; Referee: Mohammed Al-Hakim

16 April 2023 Round 3	AIK	2–0	Hammarby IF	Solna
15:00	Fesshaie 41', 53'; Hussein (yellow card) 51'; Modesto (yellow card) 52'; Haliti (yellow card) 56'; Papagiannopoulos (yellow card) 75'; Björnström (yellow card) 88'	Report	Kurtulus (yellow card) 51'; Đukanović (yellow card) 88'	Stadium: Friends Arena; Attendance: 41 142; Referee: Glenn Nyberg

22 April 2023 Round 4	Hammarby IF	2–0	Varbergs BoIS	Stockholm
15:00	Dahlström 39' (o.g.); Đukanović 48'	Report	Karlsson (yellow card) 15'; Al Hamlawi (yellow card) 63'; Tranberg (yellow card) 64'; O. Alfonsi (yellow card) 76'	Stadium: Tele2 Arena; Attendance: 23 163; Referee: Joakim Östling

30 April 2023 Round 5	Malmö FF	4–2	Hammarby IF	Malmö
15:00	Vecchia 15'; Kiese Thelin 36', 43', 59'	Report	Pinas (yellow card) 39'; Đukanović 58'; Nalić 73'	Stadium: Eleda Stadion; Attendance: 21 102; Referee: Mohammed Al-Hakim

4 May 2023 Round 6	IFK Norrköping	2–0	Hammarby IF	Norrköping
19:00	Nyman (yellow card) 21', (goal) 79', 85'; Sigurðsson (yellow card) 65'; Ortmark (yellow card) 82'	Report	Strand (yellow card) 13' (yellow-red card) 90+4'; Mikkelsen (yellow card) 34'	Stadium: PlatinumCars Arena; Attendance: 13 647; Referee: Kristoffer Karlsson

9 May 2023 Round 7	Hammarby IF	0–0	Mjällby AIF	Stockholm
19:00	Adjei (yellow card) 90'	Report	Brorsson (yellow card) 49'	Stadium: Tele2 Arena; Attendance: 19 293; Referee: Granit Maqedonci

14 May 2023 Round 8	Hammarby IF	4–3	Djurgårdens IF	Stockholm
15:00	Tekie (yellow card) 24'; Besara 34' (pen.), 84' (pen.), (yellow card) 84'; Adjei 45+4'; Löfgren 56' (o.g.); Strand (yellow card) 59'; Hammar (yellow card) 79'; Pinas (yellow card) 79'; Dovin (yellow card) 90+2'	Report	Kurtulus 49' (o.g.); Radetinac 63', (yellow card) 79'; Danielson 88' (pen.)	Stadium: Tele2 Arena; Attendance: 26 442; Referee: Mohammed Al-Hakim

21 May 2023 Round 9	IFK Göteborg	1–1	Hammarby IF	Gothenburg
17:30	Adjei (yellow card) 9'; Kurtulus (yellow card) 25' (yellow-red card) 63'; Sadiku 44'; Nilsson (yellow card) 85'; Besara (yellow card) 86'; Hammar (yellow card) 89'	Report	Svensson (yellow card) 71'; Berg 87' (pen.)	Stadium: Gamla Ullevi; Attendance: 17 289; Referee: Fredrik Klitte

29 May 2023 Round 10	Hammarby IF	0–2	IFK Värnamo	Värnamo
19:00	Strand (yellow card) 50'	Report	Engvall 53'; Näsström (yellow card) 62'; Lohikangas 79'	Stadium: Finnvedsvallen; Attendance: 19 420; Referee: Mohammed Al-Hakim

4 June 2023 Round 11	Halmstads BK	0–0	Hammarby IF	Halmstad
15:00	Al-Ammari (yellow card) 83'	Report	Kurtulus (yellow card) 86'	Stadium: Örjans Vall; Attendance: 8 519; Referee: Victor Wolf

9 June 2023 Round 12	Hammarby IF	2–1	IF Brommapojkarna	Stockholm
19:00	Besara 15'; Karlsson (yellow card) 53'; Erabi 90+4', (yellow card) 90+5'	Report	Fritzson 73'	Stadium: Tele2 Arena; Attendance: 19 243; Referee: Adam Ladebäck

3 July 2023 Round 13	IF Elfsborg	2–0	Hammarby IF	Borås
19:00	Lagerbielke (yellow card) 5'; Guðjohnsen 13'; Rømer (yellow card) 53'; Hult (yellow card) 62'; Larsson 86'	Report	Strand (yellow card) 68'; Erabi (yellow card) 90+3'	Attendance: 11 649; Referee: Granit Maqedonci

9 July 2023 Round 14	IK Sirius	1–2	Hammarby IF	Uppsala
15:00	Matthews 41'	Report	Erabi 37'; Hammar 74'	Stadium: Studenternas IP; Attendance: 9 484; Referee: Fredrik Klitte

16 July 2023 Round 15	Hammarby IF	3–1	Kalmar FF	Stockholm
15:00	Erabi 11'; Đukanović 32'; Tekie 90+9'	Report	Shamoun 76', (yellow card) 85'	Stadium: Tele2 Arena; Attendance: 21 132; Referee: Victor Wolf

21 July 2023 Round 16	IF Brommapojkarna	1–0	Hammarby IF	Stockholm
19:00	Ackermann (yellow card) 37', (goal) 56'; Pettersson (yellow card) 45+4'; Fritzson (yellow card) 74'; Kroon (yellow card) 90+4'	Report	Hammar (yellow card) 42'	Stadium: Grimsta IP; Attendance: 4 009; Referee: Glenn Nyberg

30 July 2023 Round 17	Hammarby IF	2–1	IFK Norrköping	Stockholm
15:00	Nalić 56'; Đukanović 90+1', (yellow card) 90+2'; Kurtulus (yellow card) 90+7'	Report	Ortmark (yellow card) 22'; Traustason (yellow card) 71', (goal) 82'; Eriksson (yellow card) 90+7'; Ceesay (yellow card) 90+7'	Stadium: Tele2 Arena; Attendance: 21 348; Referee: Kristoffer Karlsson

25 May 2023 Round 18	Degerfors IF	2–2	Hammarby IF	Degerfors
19:00	Vukojević 59'; Örqvist 65', (yellow card) 67'	Report	Sadiku (yellow card) 12'; Karlsson 42'; Adjei (red card) 45'; Hammar (yellow card) 52'; Madjed 71'	Stadium: Stora Valla; Attendance: 4 805; Referee: Kaspar Sjöberg

13 August 2023 Round 19	Hammarby IF	1–0	IF Elfsborg	Stockholm
17:30	Adjei (yellow card) 11'; Sadiku (yellow card) 24'; Nalić 36'; Strand (yellow card) 66'; Pinas (yellow card) 90+5'	Report	Boateng (yellow card) 45+1'	Stadium: Tele2 Arena; Attendance: 21 876; Referee: Granit Maqedonci

20 August 2023 Round 20	Kalmar FF	0–0	Hammarby IF	Kalmar
17:30		Report		Stadium: Guldfågeln Arena; Attendance: 8 378; Referee: Glenn Nyberg

27 August 2023 Round 21	Mjällby AIF	0–3	Hammarby IF	Hällevik
15:00	Löfquist (yellow card) 16'; Eile (yellow card) 58'	Report	Erabi 47'; Besara 55'; Đukanović 86'	Stadium: Strandvallen; Attendance: 4 232; Referee: Kristoffer Karlsson

3 September 2023 Round 22	Hammarby IF	4–2	AIK	Stockholm
15:00	Erabi 28'; Besara 58'; Hammar (yellow card) 62'; Đukanović 65', (yellow card) 78', (goal) 90+1'; Rafferty (yellow card) 90+5'; Strand (yellow card) 95'	Report	Faraj 24'; Otieno (yellow card) 45+1'; Beširović (yellow card) 62'; Thychosen 77'; Salétros (yellow card) 90+5'; Durmaz (yellow card) 90+6'	Stadium: Tele2 Arena; Attendance: 27 568; Referee: Adam Ladebäck

17 September 2022 Round 23	Hammarby IF	1–3	Malmö FF	Stockholm
15:00	Đukanović 83'	Report	Berg 19'; Vecchia 40', (yellow card) 44'; Rieks (yellow card) 41'; Rosengren 74', (yellow card) 85'	Stadium: Tele2 Arena; Attendance: 26 747; Referee: Mohammed Al-Hakim

24 September 2023 Round 24	Varbergs BoIS	0–1	Hammarby IF	Varberg
17:30	Tranberg (yellow card) 58'	Report	Erabi 80'	Stadium: Påskbergsvallen; Attendance: 1 998; Referee: Granit Maqedonci

1 October 2023 Round 25	Hammarby IF	v	IFK Göteborg	Stockholm
17:30	Fenger (yellow card) 10'; Kurtulus (yellow card) 45+2'; Erabi 53'; Hammar (yellow card) 90'	Report	Hausner (yellow card) 25'; Selmani (yellow card) 51'; Muçolli 90+2' (pen.)	Stadium: Tele2 Arena; Attendance: 25 784; Referee: Fredrik Klitte

8 October 2023 Round 26	Hammarby IF	2–2	BK Häcken	Stockholm
17:30	Nalić 44', (yellow card) 71'; Besara 61' (pen.), (yellow card) 66'; Demirol (yellow card) 79'	Report	Ousou (yellow card) 17'; Chilufya 69'; Sonko 90+5'	Stadium: Tele2 Arena; Attendance: 19 129; Referee: Glenn Nyberg

22 October 2023 Round 27	Djurgårdens IF	0–0	Hammarby IF	Stockholm
15:00	Bergvall (yellow card) 32'	Report	Hammar (yellow card) 43'; Karlsson (yellow card) 63'; Strand (yellow card) 90+13'	Stadium: Tele2 Arena; Attendance: 24 564; Referee: Mohammed Al-Hakim

29 October 2023 Round 28	Hammarby IF	2–2	IK Sirius	Stockholm
19:00	Kurtulus (yellow card) 11'; Gül (yellow card) 23'; Besara 40'; Đukanović 60'	Report	Alsanati 90+2'; Castegren 90+2'; Voelkerling Persson 90+5'	Stadium: Tele2 Arena; Attendance: 17 655; Referee: Granit Maqedonci

4 November 2023 Round 29	IFK Värnamo	0–0	Hammarby IF	Värnamo
15:00	Wenderson (yellow card) 87'	Report	Trawally (yellow card) 22'; Fenger (yellow card) 75'	Stadium: Finnvedsvallen; Attendance: 3 924; Referee: Glenn Nyberg

12 November 2023 Round 30	Hammarby IF	2–2	Halmstads BK	Stockholm
15:00	Besara 43'; Adjei (yellow card) 46'; Đukanović 65'; Sadiku (yellow card) 90+3'	Report	Granath 10'; Mohammed (yellow card) 42', (goal) 69'; Karlsson (yellow card) 55'	Stadium: Tele2 Arena; Attendance: 18 402; Referee: Kristoffer Karlsson

=== Svenska Cupen ===
==== 2022–23 ====
The tournament continued from the 2022 season.

Kickoff times are in UTC+1.

===== Group 3 =====
Pos	Team	Pld	W	D	L	GF	GA	GD	Pts	Qualification
1	Hammarby IF	3	3	0	0	15	1	+14	9	Advance to Knockout Stage
2	IK Brage	3	2	0	1	8	4	+4	6	
3	Norrby IF	3	0	1	2	1	9	−8	1	
4	GIF Sundsvall	3	0	1	2	1	11	−10	1	

Rules for classification: 1) Points; 2) Goal difference; 3) Goals scored; 4) Head-to-head record; 5) Lowest disciplinary points; 6) Highest ranked team

19 February 2023 Matchday 1	Hammarby IF	4–1	IK Brage	Stockholm
17:30	Besara 34', 85'; Kurtulus (yellow card) 45+1'; Pinas (yellow card) 50'; Erabi 89'; Madjed 90+1'	Report	Rödin (yellow card) 41'; Zetterström (yellow card) 64'; Izountouemoi (yellow card) 64'; Sjöberg 90+4'	Stadium: Tele2 Arena; Attendance: 19 011; Referee: Mohammed Al-Hakim

25 February 2023 Matchday 2	Norrby IF	0–3	Hammarby IF	Borås
13:00	Helge (yellow card) 10'; Svendsén (yellow card) 18'; Pärleholt (yellow card) 49'; Atola (yellow card) 81'	Report	Erabi 6', 69'; Đukanović 58'	Stadium: Borås Arena; Attendance: 1 423; Referee: Fredrik Klitte

5 March 2023 Matchday 3	Hammarby IF	8–0	GIF Sundsvall	Stockholm
17:30	Tekie 8'; Nilsson 11'; Pinas 14'; Madjed 25', 38', 47'; Besara 59'; Saidi 65' (pen.)	Report	Lundgren (yellow card) 52'	Stadium: Tele2 Arena; Attendance: 17 318; Referee: Victor Wolf

===== Knockout stage =====
13 March 2023 Quarter-finals	Hammarby IF	2–1	AIK	Stockholm
19:00	Saidi (yellow card) 7'; Kurtulus 21'; Erabi 47', (yellow card) 90+6'; Strand (yellow card) 81'; Tekie (yellow card) 90+7'; Hammar (yellow card) 90+8'	Report	Modesto (yellow card) 30'; Guidetti 45+1', (yellow card) 90+7'; Durmaz (yellow card) 90+8'	Stadium: Tele2 Arena; Attendance: 28 279; Referee: Mohammed Al-Hakim

18 March 2023 Semi-finals	Mjällby AIF	1–0	Hammarby IF	Hällevik
15:00	A. Johansson 38'; H. Johansson (yellow card) 53'	Report	Demirol (yellow card) 90+4'	Stadium: Strandvallen; Attendance: 3 233; Referee: Andreas Ekberg

==== 2023–24 ====
The tournament continues into the 2024 season.

===== Qualification stage =====
20 August 2023 Round 2	Hudiksvalls FF	0–2	Hammarby IF	Hudiksvall
18:00	Söderlund (yellow card) 37'; Sener (yellow card) 52'; Näsholm (yellow card) 60'; Diallo (yellow card) 90+4'	Report	Đukanović 32'; Rafferty 63'; Demirol (yellow card) 90'	Stadium: Glysisvallen; Attendance: 1 655; Referee: Edvin Sundkvist

=== UEFA Europa Conference League ===
Kickoff times are in UTC+1 unless stated otherwise.

==== 2023–24 ====
===== Qualifying phase and play-off round =====
====== Second qualifying round ======
27 July 2023 First leg	FC Twente	1–0	Hammarby IF	Enschede
20:00	Pröpper (yellow card) 45'; Steijn 53'; Hilgers (yellow card) 65'; Vlap (yellow card) 83'	Report	Pinas (yellow card) 3'; Strand (yellow card) 83'	Stadium: De Grolsch Veste; Attendance: 29 500; Referee: John Brooks, (England)

3 August 2023 Second leg	Hammarby IF	1–1 (a.e.t.) (1–2 agg.)	FC Twente	Stockholm
20:00	Kurtulus (yellow card) 27'; Erabi 38'; Strand (yellow card) 87'; Sadiku (yellow card) 99'	Report	Hilgers (yellow card) 16'; Ünüvar (yellow card) 103'; Steijn 115' van Wolfswinkel (yellow card) 120+1'	Stadium: Tele2 Arena; Attendance: 24 542; Referee: Manfredas Lukjančukas, (Lithuania)
