= 2022 Hammarby Fotboll season =

Swedish football team

Hammarby Fotboll
2022 season
- Chairman: Mattias Fri
- Head coach: Martí Cifuentes
- Stadium: Tele2 Arena
- Allsvenskan: 3rd
- 2021–22 Svenska Cupen: 2nd
- Top goalscorer: League: Gustav Ludwigson (12); All: Gustav Ludwigson; Nahir Besara (13)
- Highest home attendance: 30 216 (2 April vs Helsingborgs IF, Allsvenskan)
- Lowest home attendance: 14 153 (20 February vs Falkenbergs FF, Svenska Cupen)
Home colours	Away colours	Third colours

The 2022 season was Hammarby Fotboll's 107th in existence, their 53rd season in Allsvenskan and their 8th consecutive season in the league. They competed in Allsvenskan and Svenska Cupen, as defending champions. League play started in April. Martí Cifuentes made his first season as head coach.

== Summary ==
On 13 December 2021, shortly after the final league fixture the previous campaign, head coach Miloš Milojević was sacked by Hammarby IF, after he had sought a move to Norwegian side Rosenborg BK and visited Trondheim without Hammarby's permission, in a deal that ultimately fell through. The club's board called his behavior "unacceptable" and stated that they had "lost all their trust" in Milojević.

On 7 January 2022, Hammarby sold midfielder Aziz Ouattara Mohammed to Belgian First Division A club Genk. The terms were undisclosed, but the club confirmed they had received the second biggest transfer fee in its history, reportedly set at around 30 million SEK. On 31 January 2022, Hammarby sold winger Akinkunmi Amoo for reportedly 46 million SEK to F.C. Copenhagen, at the time a record transfer fee for the club.

In early January 2022, Martí Cifuentes was appointed as new head coach, signed from Danish club AaB on a three-year contract. In late May, Hammarby reached the final of the 2021–22 Svenska Cupen, but lost 4–5 on penalties to Malmö FF after the game ended in a 0–0 draw.

During the summer transfer window, Hammarby sold Williot Swedberg to Celta de Vigo for a reported fee of 56 million SEK bonuses and a sell-on clause, making it a new record breaking transfer for Hammarby. At the same time, Hammarby paid a new record breaking fee in July, signing Veton Berisha from Viking FK for a reported sum of around 20 million NOK.

In Allsvenskan, Hammarby finished 3rd in the table, thus qualifying for the 2023–24 UEFA Europa Conference League. Midfielder Nahir Besara played all 30 fixtures, scoring 11 goals and providing 11 assists, the most in the whole league. At the end of the season, he was nominated for Allsvenskan Midfielder of the Year, an award that eventually went to Mikkel Rygaard, but was voted Hammarby Player of the Year by the supporters of the club.

== Players ==
=== Squad information ===
N	Pos.	Nat.	Name	Age	Since	App	Goals	Ends	Transfer fee	Notes
2	DF	(Sweden)	Simon Sandberg	28	2018	122	1	2022	Free	
4	DF	(Sweden)	Richard Magyar	31	2019	92	5	2022 (July)	Free	
5	DF	(Iraq)	Mohanad Jeahze	25	2020	61	4	2023	Undisclosed	
6	MF	(Sweden)	Darijan Bojanić (captain)	28	2019	110	9	2023 (July)	Free	
8	MF	(Denmark)	Jeppe Andersen	30	2017	148	6	2023 (July)	Free	
9	FW	(Norway)	Veton Berisha	28	2022	14	4	2026	Undisclosed	
11	FW	(The Gambia)	Bubacarr Trawally	28	2022	9	2	2023	Undisclosed	
13	DF	(Denmark)	Mads Fenger	32	2017	135	6	2023	Free	
14	MF	(Sweden)	Dennis Collander	20	2022	5	0	2026 (July)	Undisclosed	
15	MF	(Sweden)	Pavle Vagić	22	2022	12	0	2026	Undisclosed	
16	FW	(Sweden)	Gustav Ludwigson	29	2020	88	32	2026	Undisclosed	
17	MF	(Spain)	David Concha	26	2022	13	0	2024	Free	
18	MF	(Kosovo)	Loret Sadiku	31	2022	21	0	2024	Free	
20	MF	(Sweden)	Nahir Besara	31	2022	99	27	2023	Free	
21	DF	(Sweden)	Edvin Kurtulus	22	2022	27	2	2024	Free	
22	MF	(Sweden)	Joel Nilsson	28	2022	22	5	2023	Free	
23	DF	(Iceland)	Jón Guðni Fjóluson	33	2021	21	1	2023	Free	
24	GK	(Sweden)	Oliver Dovin	20	2019	26	0	2024 (July)	Youth system	
25	GK	(Sweden)	Davor Blažević	29	2018	37	0	2022	Free	
26	DF	(Sweden)	Kalle Björklund	23	2019	14	1	2022	Free	
27	GK	(Sweden)	Sebastian Selin	19	2022	0	0	2025	Free	
29	FW	(Ivory Coast)	Bayéré Junior Loué	21	2021	5	0	2023	Undisclosed	
30	DF	(Suriname)	Shaquille Pinas	24	2022	14	0	2025	Undisclosed	
32	DF	(Ghana)	Nathaniel Adjei	20	2022	3	0	2026 (July)	Undisclosed	
34	MF	(Sweden)	Alper Demirol	20	2022	13	0	2024	Youth system	
40	FW	(Sweden)	Abdelrahman Saidi	23	2022	17	3	2026	Undisclosed	

- Last updated: 6 November 2022
- Source: Hammarby Fotboll and players' Wikipedia articles
- Ordered by squad number.

=== Transfers ===
==== In ====
No.	Pos.	Nat.	Name	Age	Moving from	Type	Transfer window	Ends	Transfer fee	Source
21	DF	(Kosovo)	Edvin Kurtulus	21	Halmstads BK	Bosman	Winter	2024	Free	hammarbyfotboll.se
22	MF	(Sweden)	Joel Nilsson	27	Mjällby AIF	Bosman	Winter	2023	Free	hammarbyfotboll.se
27	GK	(Sweden)	Sebastian Selin	18	Västerås SK	Transfer	Winter	2025	Undisclosed	hammarbyfotboll.se
14	MF	(Sweden)	Dennis Collander	19	Örebro SK	Transfer	Winter	2026 (June)	Undisclosed	hammarbyfotboll.se
20	MF	(Sweden)	Nahir Besara	30	Örebro SK	Bosman	Winter	2023	Free	hammarbyfotboll.se
18	MF	(Kosovo)	Loret Sadiku	30	Kasımpaşa (Turkey)	Bosman	Winter	2024	Free	hammarbyfotboll.se
11	FW	(The Gambia)	Bubacarr Trawally	27	Ajman (United Arab Emirates)	Transfer	Winter	2023	Free	hammarbyfotboll.se
17	MF	(Spain)	David Concha	25	Badajoz (Spain)	Bosman	Summer	2024	Free	hammarbyfotboll.se
15	MF	(Sweden)	Pavle Vagić	22	Rosenborg (Norway)	Transfer	Summer	2026	Undisclosed	hammarbyfotboll.se
32	DF	(Ghana)	Nathaniel Adjei	19	Danbort FC (Ghana)	Transfer	Summer	2026 (July)	Undisclosed	hammarbyfotboll.se
40	FW	(Sweden)	Abdelrahman Saidi	22	Degerfors IF	Transfer	Summer	2026	Undisclosed	hammarbyfotboll.se
30	DF	(Suriname)	Shaquille Pinas	24	Ludogorets Razgrad (Bulgaria)	Transfer	Summer	2025	Undisclosed	hammarbyfotboll.se
34	MF	(Sweden)	Alper Demirol	19	Youth system	Promoted	Winter	2024	–	hammarbyfotboll.se
9	FW	(Norway)	Veton Berisha	28	Viking FK (Norway)	Transfer	Summer	2026	Undisclosed	hammarbyfotboll.se

==== Out ====
No.	Pos.	Nat.	Name	Age	Moving to	Type	Transfer window	Transfer fee	Source
1	GK	(Denmark)	David Ousted	36	Retired	End of contract	Winter		hammarbyfotboll.se
11	MF	(Montenegro)	Vladimir Rodić	28	Free transfer	End of contract	Winter	Free	expressen.se
9	FW	(Brazil)	Paulinho Guerreiro	35	(Brazil) São José	End of contract	Winter	Free	fotbollskanalen.se
35	DF	(Sweden)	Axel Sjöberg	21	Free transfer	End of contract	Winter	Free	fotbollskanalen.se
20	MF	(Ghana)	David Accam	31	(United States) Nashville SC	End of loan	Winter	End of loan	fotbollskanalen.se
27	DF	(Sweden)	Josafat Mendes	18	AIK	Transfer	Winter	Undisclosed	hammarbyfotboll.se
32	MF	(Ivory Coast)	Aziz Ouattara Mohammed	20	(Belgium) Genk	Transfer	Winter	Undisclosed	hammarbyfotboll.se
33	MF	(Nigeria)	Akinkunmi Amoo	19	(Denmark) Copenhagen	Transfer	Winter	Undisclosed	hammarbyfotboll.se
7	FW	(Slovenia)	Aljoša Matko	21	(Slovenia) Olimpija Ljubljana	Loan	Winter	Loan	hammarbyfotboll.se
18	FW	(Sweden)	Filston Mawana	21	Åtvidabergs FF	Transfer	Winter	Free transfer	hammarbyfotboll.se
44	MF	(Sweden)	Williot Swedberg	18	(Spain) RC Celta de Vigo	Transfer	Summer	Undisclosed	hammarbyfotboll.se
15	MF	(Sweden)	Mayckel Lahdo	19	(Netherlands) AZ Alkmaar	Transfer	Summer	Undisclosed	hammarbyfotboll.se
42	DF	(Denmark)	Bjørn Paulsen	31	(Denmark) OB	Transfer	Summer	Undisclosed	hammarbyfotboll.se
17	MF	(Sweden)	Abdul Khalili	30	Free transfer	End of contract	Summer	Free	hammarbyfotboll.se
9	FW	(Kosovo)	Astrit Selmani	25	(Israel) Hapoel Be'er Sheva	Transfer	Summer	Undisclosed	hammarbyfotboll.se
3	DF	(Sweden)	Dennis Widgren	28	IK Sirius	Transfer	Summer	Undisclosed	hammarbyfotboll.se
31	DF	(Sweden)	Ben Engdahl	18	(Denmark) Nordsjælland	Transfer	Summer	Undisclosed	hammarbyfotboll.se
7	FW	(Slovenia)	Aljoša Matko	22	(Slovenia) Celje	Transfer	Summer	Undisclosed	hammarbyfotboll.se

== Player statistics ==
=== Appearances and goals ===
No.	Pos	Nat	Player	Total		Allsvenskan		2021–22 and 2022–23 Svenska Cupen	
No.	Pos	Nat	Player	Apps	Goals	Apps	Goals	Apps	Goals
Goalkeepers
24	GK	(Sweden) SWE	Oliver Dovin	21	0	17	0	4	0
25	GK	(Sweden) SWE	Davor Blažević	17	0	13+1	0	3	0
27	GK	(Sweden) SWE	Sebastian Selin	0	0	0	0	0	0
Defenders
2	DF	(Sweden) SWE	Simon Sandberg	33	0	24+3	0	6	0
4	DF	(Sweden) SWE	Richard Magyar	13	2	7+1	0	5	2
5	DF	(Iraq) IRQ	Mohanad Jeahze	33	3	25+1	3	6+1	0
13	DF	(Denmark) DEN	Mads Fenger	33	2	25+1	1	7	1
21	DF	(Sweden) SWE	Edvin Kurtulus	32	2	25+2	2	1+4	0
23	DF	(Iceland) ISL	Jón Guðni Fjóluson	0	0	0	0	0	0
26	DF	(Sweden) SWE	Kalle Björklund	0	0	0	0	0	0
23	DF	(Suriname) SUR	Shaquille Pinas	15	0	9+5	0	1	0
32	DF	(Ghana) GHA	Nathaniel Adjei	4	0	1+2	0	1	0
Midfielders
6	MF	(Sweden) SWE	Darijan Bojanić	36	6	26+3	4	6+1	2
8	MF	(Denmark) DEN	Jeppe Andersen	34	2	15+12	1	6+1	1
14	MF	(Sweden) SWE	Dennis Collander	6	0	3+2	0	0+1	0
15	MF	(Sweden) SWE	Pavle Vagić	13	0	1+11	0	1	0
17	MF	(Spain) ESP	David Concha	14	0	1+12	0	1	0
18	MF	(Kosovo) KOS	Loret Sadiku	24	0	19+2	0	1+2	0
20	MF	(Sweden) SWE	Nahir Besara	36	13	27+3	11	5+1	2
22	MF	(Sweden) SWE	Joel Nilsson	28	6	11+11	5	3+3	1
33	MF	(Sweden) SWE	Fredrik Hammar	2	0	0+1	0	0+1	0
34	MF	(Sweden) SWE	Alper Demirol	15	0	2+11	0	1+1	0
40	MF	(Sweden) SWE	Abdelrahman Saidi	18	3	10+7	3	0+1	0
Forwards
9	FW	(Norway) NOR	Veton Berisha	15	4	12+2	4	0+1	0
11	FW	(The Gambia) GAM	Bubacarr Trawally	11	2	4+5	2	1+1	0
16	FW	(Sweden) SWE	Gustav Ludwigson	33	13	29	12	4	1
19	FW	(Sweden) SWE	Jusef Erabi	12	0	0+7	0	1+4	0
29	FW	(Ivory Coast) CIV	Bayéré Junior Loué	0	0	0	0	0	0
Players transferred/loaned out during the season
3	DF	(Sweden) SWE	Dennis Widgren	8	0	1+7	0	0	0
7	FW	(Slovenia) SLO	Aljoša Matko	0	0	0	0	0	0
9	FW	(Kosovo) KOS	Astrit Selmani	19	6	8+5	2	6	4
15	MF	(Sweden) SWE	Mayckel Lahdo	13	2	4+6	1	3	1
17	MF	(Sweden) SWE	Abdul Khalili	4	0	0+3	0	0+1	0
31	DF	(Sweden) SWE	Ben Engdahl	2	0	0	0	0+2	0
42	DF	(Denmark) DEN	Bjørn Paulsen	19	2	2+11	1	0+6	1
44	MF	(Sweden) SWE	Williot Swedberg	16	5	9+1	5	4+2	0

Last updated: 6 November 2022
Source: hammarbyfotboll.se

== Club ==
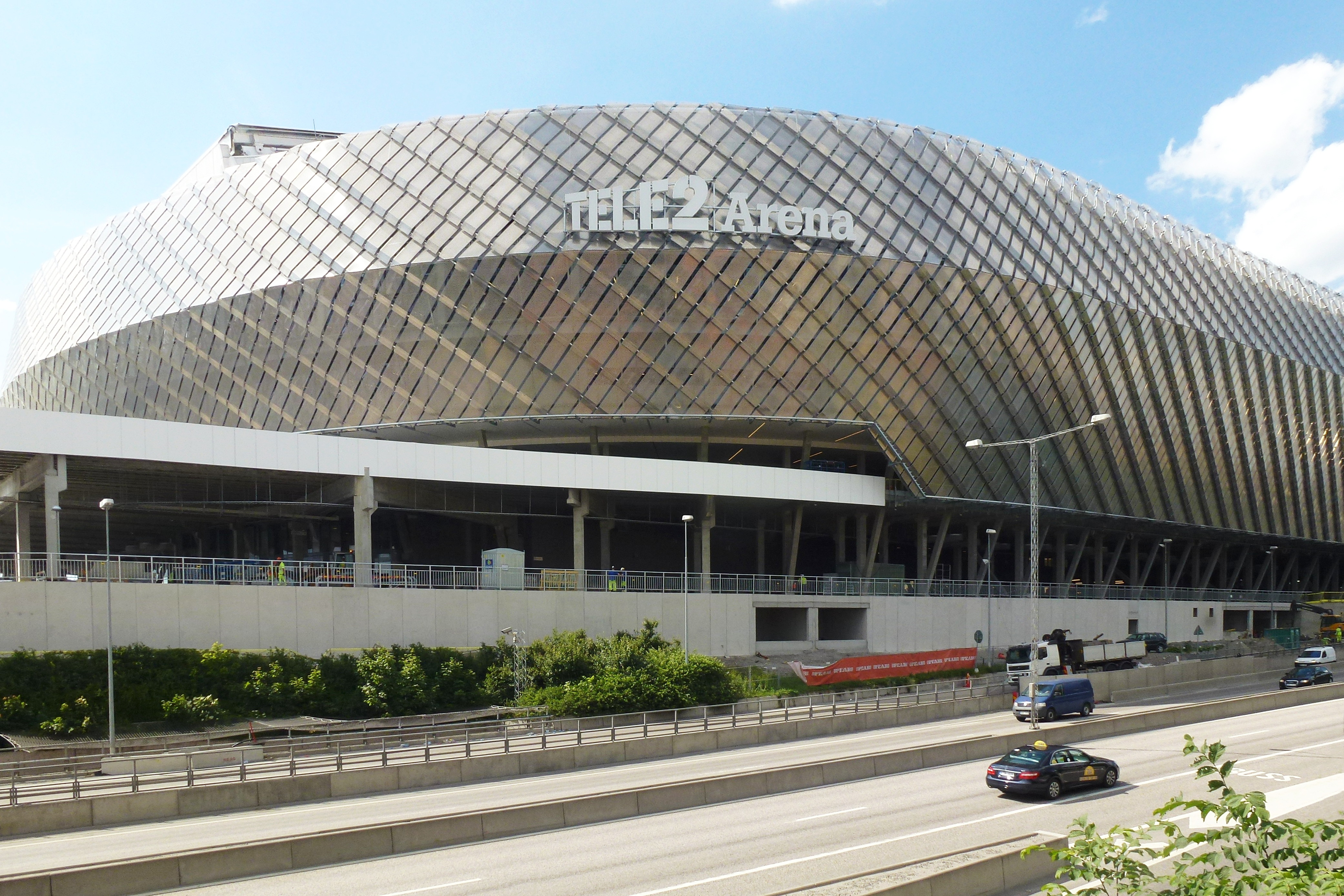
Tele2 Arena is the second largest stadium in Allsvenskan.

== Technical staff ==
Position	Staff
Head coach	(Spain) Martí Cifuentes
Assistant coaches	(Spain) Xavi Calm
Assistant coaches	(Sweden) Imad Khalili
Data analyst	(Hungary) Ábel Lőrincz
Fitness coach	(England) Perry Wild
Goalkeeper coach	(Sweden) Mikael "Mille" Olsson
Team administrators	(Sweden) Atena Gerontidou
Team administrators	(Sweden) Wadda Tamimi
Equipment manager	(Sweden) Anders Bitén
Physios	(Sweden) Magnus Svärd
Physios	(Sweden) Ludvig Axelsson
U19 head coach	(Sweden) Fredrik Samuelsson
U17 head coach	(Sweden) Jonas Holtbäck
U19 and U17 goalkeeper coach	(Sweden) Gustav Scheutz Dahlström

=== Other information ===
Chairman	(Sweden) Mattias Fri
Managing director	(Sweden) Richard von Yxkull
Director of football	(Sweden) Jesper Jansson
Head of scouting	(Sweden) Mikael Hjelmberg
Ground (capacity and dimensions)	Tele2 Arena (33,000 / )

== Pre-season and friendlies ==
=== Friendlies ===
29 January 2022 Friendly	IK Sirius	1–3	Hammarby IF	Uppsala
14:00 CET (UTC+01)	Kouakou 29'	Report	Ludwigson 40'; Mawana 54' (pen.); Harabi 68'	Stadium: Studenternas IP; Referee: Rambod Beigi (Sweden)

4 February 2022 Friendly	IFK Göteborg	0–2	Hammarby IF	Marbella
15:00 CET (UTC+01)	Vilar (yellow card) 53'	Report	Ludwigson 37' (pen.); Sandberg (yellow card) 39'; Magyar 66', (yellow card) 77'	Stadium: Marbella Football Center; Attendance: 30 216

9 February 2022 Friendly	Vélez CF (Spain)	0–5	(Sweden) Hammarby IF	Estepona
16:30 CET (UTC+01)	Camacho (yellow card) 51'	Report	Selmani 4', 10'; Nilsson 28'; Diocunda 40'; Erabi 86'	Stadium: Arroyo Enmedio

11 February 2022 Friendly	Hammarby IF (Sweden)	1–3	(Norway) Molde FK	Estepona
13:00 CET (UTC+01)	Erabi 54'	Report	Wolff Eikrem 20'; Fofana 56', 72'	Stadium: Arroyo Enmedio

26 March 2022 Friendly	HJK (Finland)	2–2	(Sweden) Hammarby IF	Helsinki
13:00 EET (UTC+02)	Radulović 34', 71' (pen.); Murilo (red card) 42'	Report	Ludwigson 36'; Nilsson 39'	Stadium: Bolt Arena

== Competitions ==
=== Allsvenskan ===
==== League table ====
Pos	Team	Pld	W	D	L	GF	GA	GD	Pts	Qualification or relegation
1	BK Häcken (C)	30	18	10	2	69	37	+32	64	Qualification for the Champions League first qualifying round
2	Djurgårdens IF	30	17	6	7	55	25	+30	57	Qualification for the Europa Conference League second qualifying round (Note: The 2022–23 Svenska Cupen winners qualified for the Europa Conference League second qualifying round. Since the cup winners (BK Häcken) qualified based on league position, the cup winner spot was passed to the second-placed team, and the last Conference League second qualifying round spot was passed to the fourth-placed team.)
3	Hammarby IF	30	16	8	6	60	27	+33	56	Qualification for the Europa Conference League second qualifying round
4	Kalmar FF	30	15	6	9	41	27	+14	51	Qualification for the Europa Conference League second qualifying round
5	AIK	30	14	8	8	45	36	+9	50	

Source: svenskfotboll.se (in Swedish)
Rules for classification: 1) Points; 2) Goal difference; 3) Goals scored; 4) Head-to-head points; 5) Head-to-head goal difference; 6) Head-to-head away goals scored; 7) Play-off
(Note: Play-off is only played if need to decide champion, teams for relegation or UEFA competition and will be played on a neutral ground).
(C) Champions

==== Results summary ====
Overall								Home						Away					
Pld	W	D	L	GF	GA	GD	Pts	W	D	L	GF	GA	GD	W	D	L	GF	GA	GD
30	16	8	6	60	27	+33	56	9	5	1	37	13	+24	7	3	5	23	14	+9

Source: svenskfotboll.se (in Swedish)

==== Results by round ====
Round	1	2	3	4	5	6	7	8	9	10	11	12	13	14	15	16	17	18	19	20	21	22	23	24	25	26	27	28	29	30
Ground	H	A	H	A	A	H	A	H	H	A	H	A	H	H	A	H	H	A	H	A	A	H	A	A	H	A	H	A	H	A
Result	W	W	W	W	W	D	L	D	W	L	D	L	W	W	W	L	W	W	W	D	L	D	D	D	W	W	D	L	W	W
Position	4	1	1	1	1	1	1	1	1	2	2	3	3	3	3	4	3	3	2	3	3	3	3	3	3	2	3	3	3	3

Source: see below
A = Away; H = Home; W = Win; D = Draw; L = Loss

==== Matches ====
Kickoff times are in (UTC+01) unless stated otherwise.

2 April 2022 Round 1	Hammarby IF	2–1	Helsingborgs IF	Stockholm
15:00	Ludwigson 18'; Lahdo (yellow card) 35'; Swedberg 90+1'; Jeahze (yellow card) 90+6'	Report	Weberg (yellow card) 60'; Tsouka (yellow card) 67'; Amoako (yellow card) 90+3'; Al Hamlawi 90+7'	Stadium: Tele2 Arena; Attendance: 30 216; Referee: Adam Ladebäck

9 April 2022 Round 2	GIF Sundsvall	1–5	Hammarby IF	Sundsvall
15:00	Ylätupa 15'; Lundström (yellow card) 57'	Report	Besara 10', 77'; Kurtulus 23'; Swedberg 29', 35'	Stadium: NP3 Arena; Attendance: 6 175; Referee: Mohammed Al-Hakim

15 April 2022 Round 3	Hammarby IF	2–0	Mjällby AIF	Stockholm
15:00	Ludwigson 57'; Jeahze (yellow card) 70'; Lahdo 90'	Report	Rosengren (yellow card) 23'; Kričak (yellow card) 45'; Löfquist (yellow card) 56'	Stadium: Tele2 Arena; Attendance: 24 764; Referee: Joakim Östling

21 April 2022 Round 4	Degerfors IF	0–1	Hammarby IF	Degerfors
19:00	Gyau (yellow card) 38'; Sabetkar (yellow card) 57'; Đurđić (yellow card) 72'	Report	Kurtulus 25'; Swedberg (yellow card) 45+3'; Dovin (yellow card) 78'; Nilsson (yellow card) 79'; Paulsen (yellow card) 86'	Stadium: Stora Valla; Attendance: 4 833; Referee: Kristoffer Karlsson

25 April 2022 Round 5	IK Sirius	0–3	Hammarby IF	Uppsala
19:00	Björkström (yellow card) 74'	Report	Kurtulus (yellow card) 13'; Swedberg 41', (yellow card) 44', (goal) 78'; Besara 47'	Stadium: Studenternas IP; Attendance: 10 038; Referee: Adam Ladebäck

2 May 2022 Round 6	Hammarby IF	0–0	Malmö FF	Stockholm
19:00	Jeahze (yellow card) 30'; Bojanić (yellow card) 41'	Report	Rakip (yellow card) 75'	Stadium: Tele2 Arena; Attendance: 29 696; Referee: Glenn Nyberg

8 May 2022 Round 7	Kalmar FF	2–0	Hammarby IF	Kalmar
17:30	Shamoun 35', 38'	Report		Stadium: Guldfågeln Arena; Attendance: 8 768; Referee: Fredrik Klitte

15 May 2022 Round 8	Hammarby IF	3–3	AIK	Stockholm
15:00	Ludwigson 32'; Jeahze 40'; Fenger (yellow card) 63'; Kurtulus (yellow card) 69'; Besara 72'	Report	Bahoui 9', 84'; Larsson 64' (pen.); Papagiannopoulos (yellow card) 72'; Janošević (yellow card) 73'; Björnström (yellow card) 89'	Stadium: Tele2 Arena; Attendance: 28 756; Referee: Kristoffer Karlsson

22 May 2022 Round 9	Hammarby IF	3–0	IFK Norrköping	Stockholm
15:00	Sandberg (yellow card) 24'; Bojanić 32', 61'; Fenger (yellow card) 45+2'; Sadiku (yellow card) 58'; Selmani 71'	Report	Jean (yellow card) 63'; Ortmark (yellow card) 69'; Abdulrazak (yellow card) 90+3'	Stadium: Tele2 Arena; Attendance: 26 137; Referee: Kaspar Sjöberg

29 May 2022 Round 10	IFK Värnamo	1–0	Hammarby IF	Värnamo
17:30	Antonsson 49', (yellow card) 80'; Kenndal (yellow card) 77'; Netinho (yellow card) 90+1'	Report		Stadium: Finnvedsvallen; Attendance: 5 010; Referee: Joakim Östling

26 June 2022 Round 11	Hammarby IF	2–2	BK Häcken	Stockholm
15:00	Sadiku (yellow card) 23'; Fenger (yellow card) 50'; Trawally 82'; Paulsen 88'	Report	Jeremejeff 58'; Rygaard 61'; Rasheed (yellow card) 90+4'	Stadium: Tele2 Arena; Attendance: 23 681; Referee: Fredrik Klitte

3 July 2022 Round 12	Djurgårdens IF	1–0	Hammarby IF	Stockholm
15:00	Wikheim 68'	Report	Kurtulus (yellow card) 36'; Sandberg (yellow card) 42'; Sadiku (yellow card) 60'	Stadium: Tele2 Arena; Attendance: 27 203; Referee: Mohammed Al-Hakim

11 July 2022 Round 13	Hammarby IF	3–0	IFK Göteborg	Stockholm
19:00	Besara 43'; Ludwigson 49'; Selmani 72' (pen.)	Report	Berg (yellow card) 30'; Al-Ammari (yellow card) 66'	Stadium: Tele2 Arena; Attendance: 28 837; Referee: Andreas Ekberg

17 July 2022 Round 14	Hammarby IF	3–0	IF Elfsborg	Stockholm
15:00	Saidi 8'; Ludwigson 45', 74'	Report	Boateng (yellow card) 23'	Stadium: Tele2 Arena; Attendance: 24 612; Referee: Victor Wolf

25 July 2022 Round 15	Varbergs BoIS	0–3	Hammarby IF	Varberg
19:00	Sverrisson (yellow card) 12'; Tranberg (yellow card) 52'; Lushaku (yellow card) 60'	Report	Ludwigson 16', 20'; Besara 65'; Andersen (yellow card) 73'	Stadium: Påskbergsvallen; Attendance: 4 320; Referee: Mohammed Al-Hakim

31 July 2022 Round 16	Hammarby IF	1–2	IFK Värnamo	Stockholm
15:00	Andersen (yellow card) 49'; Kurtulus (yellow card) 64'; Bojanić (yellow card) 74'; Besara 89' (pen.); Demirol (yellow card) 90+4'; Pinas (yellow card) 90+4'	Report	Vaitsiakhovich (yellow card) 33'; Larsson (yellow card) 38'; Tihi (yellow card) 62'; Antonsson 76', 90+3'	Stadium: Tele2 Arena; Attendance: 22 689; Referee: Kristoffer Karlsson

7 August 2022 Round 17	Hammarby IF	3–0	GIF Sundsvall	Stockholm
15:00	Saidi 1'; Berisha 71'; Lasso 89' (o.g.)	Report	Lundström (yellow card) 89'	Stadium: Tele2 Arena; Attendance: 21 526; Referee: Glenn Nyberg

15 August 2022 Round 18	IFK Göteborg	0–1	Hammarby IF	Gothenburg
19:10		Report	Jeahze (yellow card) 31'; Trawally 77'; Besara (yellow card) 90+5'	Stadium: Gamla Ullevi; Attendance: 17 351; Referee: Mohammed Al-Hakim

22 August 2022 Round 19	Hammarby IF	5–1	Degerfors IF	Stockholm
19:10	Jeahze 2'; Besara 26'; Andersen (yellow card) 52'; Kurtulus (yellow card) 64'; Berisha 65', 76'; Saidi 88'	Report	Mörfelt 42'; Vukojević (yellow card) 66'; Granath (yellow card) 73'	Stadium: Tele2 Arena; Attendance: 25 264; Referee: Bojan Pandžić

28 August 2022 Round 20	AIK	2–2	Hammarby IF	Solna
15:00	Guidetti 2'; Stefanelli 46'; Ceesay (yellow card) 54'	Report	Besara 37'; Berisha 59'; Jeahze (yellow card) 80'; Fenger (yellow card) 83'; Pinas (yellow card) 90'	Stadium: Friends Arena; Attendance: 45 117; Referee: Andreas Ekberg

5 September 2022 Round 21	IFK Norrköping	4–1	Hammarby IF	Norrköping
19:10	Skúlason (yellow card) 34'; Sigurðsson 50' (pen.), 90+6' (pen.); Traustason 71'; Levi (yellow card) 87'; Nyman 89'; Wahlqvist (yellow card) 90+1'	Report	Skúlason 42' (o.g.); Ludwigson (yellow card) 83'; Blažević (yellow card) 87'; Demirol (yellow card) 90+6'	Stadium: Nya Parken; Attendance: 13 078; Referee: Joakim Östling

11 September 2022 Round 22	Hammarby IF	0–0	Djurgårdens IF	Stockholm
15:00	Kurtulus (yellow card) 31'	Report		Stadium: Tele2 Arena; Attendance: 27 987; Referee: Mohammed Al-Hakim

17 September 2022 Round 23	BK Häcken	1–1	Hammarby IF	Gothenburg
15:00	Sa. Gustafson (yellow card) 28'; Sadiq (yellow card) 37'; Friðriksson (yellow card) 37'; Rygaard (yellow card) 45+2'; Jeremejeff (yellow card) 78'; Adjei 90' (o.g.)	Report	Ludwigson 10'	Stadium: Bravida Arena; Attendance: 6 316; Referee: Victor Wolf

1 October 2022 Round 24	Malmö FF	0–0	Hammarby IF	Malmö
15:00	Nielsen (yellow card) 45+1'; Knudsen (yellow card) 45+2'; Ceesay (yellow card) 62'; Toivonen (yellow card) 89'	Report	Dovin (yellow card) 72'; Andersen (yellow card) 88'; Vagić (yellow card) 89'	Stadium: Eleda Stadion; Attendance: 19 712; Referee: Glenn Nyberg

10 October 2022 Round 25	Hammarby IF	5–1	Varbergs BoIS	Stockholm
19:10	Besara 10'; Nilsson 20'; Bojanić 43', 47'; Kurtulus (yellow card) 45'; Jeahze (yellow card) 48'; Andersen 90+3'	Report	Johansson (yellow card) 48'; Alfonsi 62', (yellow card) 90'; Lushaku (yellow card) 81'	Stadium: Tele2 Arena; Attendance: 27 335; Referee: Fredrik Klitte

16 October 2022 Round 26	Mjällby AIF	0–3	Hammarby IF	Hällevik
17:30	Nwankwo (yellow card) 40'; Gustafson (yellow card) 71'; Kričak (yellow card) 73'	Report	Ludwigson 16'; Fenger 23'; Nilsson 32'; Saidi (yellow card) 71'	Stadium: Strandvallen; Attendance: 3 854; Referee: Fredrik Klitte

20 October 2022 Round 27	Hammarby IF	1–1	IK Sirius	Stockholm
19:30	Nilsson 58'	Report	Stensson 75', (yellow card) 75'	Stadium: Tele2 Arena; Attendance: 25 260; Referee: Granit Maqedonci

23 October 2022 Round 28	IF Elfsborg	2–1	Hammarby IF	Borås
15:00	Bernhardsson 33'; Frick (yellow card) 85'; K. Holmén (yellow card) 88'; Söderberg 89'; Qasem (yellow card) 90+3'	Report	Nilsson 55'; Sadiku (yellow card) 70'; Jeahze (yellow card) 74'; Pinas (yellow card) 85'	Stadium: Borås Arena; Attendance: 8 159; Referee: Joakim Östling

30 October 2022 Round 29	Hammarby IF	4–2	Kalmar FF	Stockholm
17:30	Ludwigson 4', 58'; Jeahze 62'; Nilsson (yellow card) 78'; Lindahl 81' (o.g.)	Report	Nanasi 53'; Berg 70'	Stadium: Tele2 Arena; Attendance: 28 826; Referee: Andreas Ekberg

6 November 2022 Round 30	Helsingborgs IF	0–2	Hammarby IF	Helsingborg
15:30	Gigovic (yellow card) 33'	Report	Nilsson 50'; Besara 79'; Kurtulus (yellow card) 88'	Stadium: Olympia; Attendance: 8 706; Referee: Glenn Nyberg

=== Svenska Cupen ===
==== 2021–22 ====
The tournament continued from the 2021 season.

Kickoff times are in UTC+1.

===== Group 3 =====
Pos	Team	Pld	W	D	L	GF	GA	GD	Pts	Qualification
1	Hammarby IF	3	3	0	0	12	2	+10	9	Advance to Knockout Stage
2	BK Häcken	3	2	0	1	18	4	+14	6	
3	Falkenbergs FF	3	1	0	2	3	7	−4	3	
4	Ytterhogdals IK	3	0	0	3	1	21	−20	0	

Updated to match(es) played on unknown. Source: Swedish Football Association
Rules for classification: 1) Points; 2) Goal difference; 3) Goals scored; 4) Head-to-head record; 5) Lowest disciplinary points; 6) Highest ranked team

20 February 2022 Matchday 1	Hammarby IF	2–1	Falkenbergs FF	Stockholm
17:30	Ludwigson 33'; Magyar 36'; Andersen (yellow card) 72'; Besara (yellow card) 80'	Report	Ärling 54'; Dahl (yellow card) 75'	Stadium: Tele2 Arena; Attendance: 14 153; Referee: Tess Olofsson

26 February 2022 Matchday 2	Ytterhogdals IK	1–6	Hammarby IF	Ånge
17:30	Alassan (yellow card) 23'; Surkka 53', (yellow card) 55'; Fonseca (yellow card) 89'	Report	Nilsson 13'; Selmani 26', 50' (pen.), 61'; Magyar 43'; Bojanić (yellow card) 82'; Lahdo 84' (pen.); Demirol (yellow card) 90+1'	Stadium: Ånge IP; Referee: Glenn Nyberg

6 March 2022 Matchday 3	Hammarby IF	4–0	BK Häcken	Stockholm
13:00	Selmani (yellow card) 14'; Bojanić 38'; Tebo Uchenna 45' (o.g.); Andersen (yellow card) 55', (goal) 60'; Jeahze (yellow card) 62'; Paulsen 90+4'	Report	Friðriksson (yellow card) 81'	Stadium: Tele2 Arena; Attendance: 14 820; Referee: Adam Ladebäck

===== Knockout stage =====
13 March 2022 Quarter-finals	Hammarby IF	3–2	IFK Norrköping	Stockholm
16:30	Magyar (yellow card) 26'; Sandberg (yellow card) 33'; Besara 42'; Bojanić 50'; Selmani 57' (pen.)	Report	Nyman 17', 20'; Jean (yellow card) 33'; Ortmark (yellow card) 45' (yellow-red card) 90+2'; Wahlqvist (yellow card) 88'	Stadium: Tele2 Arena; Attendance: 15 759; Referee: Kristoffer Karlsson

19 March 2022 Semi-finals	Hammarby IF	1–0	IF Elfsborg	Stockholm
16:00	Besara 27'; Sandberg (yellow card) 31'; Fenger (yellow card) 90+7'	Report	Frick (yellow card) 26'	Stadium: Tele2 Arena; Attendance: 22 737; Referee: Fredrik Klitte

26 May 2022 Final	Hammarby IF	0–0 (a.e.t.) (3–4 p)	Malmö FF	Stockholm
15:00	Khalili (yellow card) 93'; Paulsen (yellow card) 103'	Report	Toivonen (yellow card) 76'; Berget (yellow card) 84'	Stadium: Tele2 Arena; Attendance: 29 214; Referee: Andreas Ekberg
	Penalties
	Besara (penalty missed); Fenger (penalty scored); Trawally (penalty scored); Khalili (penalty scored); Selmani (penalty missed)		(penalty missed) Peña; (penalty scored) Birmančević; (penalty scored) Berget; (penalty missed) Olsson; (penalty scored) Toivonen

==== 2022–23 ====
The tournament continues into the 2023 season.

===== Qualification stage =====
1 September 2022 Round 2	Nyköpings BIS	1–2	Hammarby IF	Nyköping
17:00	Jarrett (yellow card) 67'; E. Ahmetovic 77', (yellow card) 86'; Khalil (yellow card) 81'; Diallo (yellow card) 90+4'	Report	Fenger 8' (pen.); A. Ahmetovic 53' (o.g.); Adjei (yellow card) 82'	Stadium: Rosvalla IP; Attendance: 2 856; Referee: Anders Dufva Johansson
