= Nathaniel Adjei =

Ghanaian footballer (born 2002)

Personal information
- Date of birth: 21 August 2002 (age 24)
- Place of birth: Teshie, Ghana
- Height: 1.91 m (6 ft 3 in)
- Position: Centre-back

Team information
- Current team: Lorient
- Number: 32

Youth career
- 2015–2017: Danbort FC

Senior career*
Years	Team	Apps	(Gls)
2018–2022	Danbort FC		
2021–2022	→ Hammarby TFF (loan)	22	(0)
2022–2024	Hammarby IF	24	(1)
2023–2024	→ Lorient (loan)	15	(0)
2024–	Lorient	24	(0)

International career^{‡}
2019–2021	Ghana U20	2	(0)
2023–	Ghana U23	2	(0)
2024–	Ghana	1	(0)
- * Club domestic league appearances and goals as of 19 May 2026 ‡ National team caps and goals as of 30 June 2023

Nathaniel Adjei (born 21 August 2002) is a Ghanaian professional footballer who plays as a centre-back for Ligue 1 club Lorient and the Ghana national team.

== Early life ==
Born and raised in Teshie, Adjei started to play youth football with local club Danbort FC at age 13. The team competed in Division One League, Ghana's second tier.

== Club career ==
On 13 August 2021, Ajdei joined Hammarby TFF in Sweden's third tier Ettan, the feeder team of Hammarby IF. He was signed on a one-year loan from Danbort, together with fellow Ghanaian player Emmanuel Agyeman Duah from Karela United.

On 11 July 2022, Adjei was promoted to Hammarby's first team, completing a permanent transfer from Danbort by signing a four-and-a-half-year contract. On 17 September the same year, Adjei made his Allsvenskan debut in a 1–1 away draw against BK Häcken, in which he scored an own goal.

On 27 January 2024, Adjei joined Lorient on loan with option to purchase in France until the end of the season.

Adjei was transferred to Lorient upon exercise of the purchase option on 15 June 2024.

== International career ==
Being part of the Ghanaian youth selections since 2018, Adjei was the vice captain of the Ghana national U17's.

Adjei was called up to the Ghana national U20's for the 2019 Africa U-20 Cup of Nations, at age 16.

He was also part of Ghana's squad in the 2021 Africa U-20 Cup of Nations. He played three games throughout the tournament, before suffering an injury ahead of the knockout stage, that Ghana went on to win through a 2–0 win in the final against Uganda.

Adjei made his debut for Ghana national team on 18 November 2024 in an Africa Cup of Nations qualifier against Niger at the Accra Sports Stadium. He started the game and was substituted after 40 minutes, as Niger won 2–1.

== Career statistics ==
=== Club ===
As of 10 May 2025

Appearances and goals by club, season and competition
Club	Season	League			National Cup (Note: Includes Svenska Cupen)		Continental		Total	
Club	Season	Division	Apps	Goals	Apps	Goals	Apps	Goals	Apps	Goals
Hammarby TFF	2021	Ettan	8	0	0	0	—		8	0
Hammarby TFF	2022	Ettan	14	0	0	0	—		14	0
Hammarby TFF	Total		22	0	0	0	0	0	22	0
Hammarby IF	2022	Allsvenskan	3	0	1	0	—		4	0
Hammarby IF	2023	Allsvenskan	21	1	5	0	2 (Note: Appearances in UEFA Europa Conference League)	0	28	1
Hammarby IF	Total		24	1	6	0	2	0	32	1
Lorient (loan)	2023–24	Ligue 1	15	0	0	0	0	0	15	0
Lorient	2024–25	Ligue 2	9	0	0	0	0	0	9	0
Career total			70	1	6	0	2	0	78	1

== Honours ==
Lorient

- Ligue 2: 2024–25
