= Abdelrahman Boudah =

Swedish footballer

Personal information
- Date of birth: 13 August 1999 (age 27)
- Place of birth: Gothenburg, Sweden
- Height: 1.83 m (6 ft 0 in)
- Positions: Winger; forward

Team information
- Current team: Västerås (loan)
- Number: 7

Youth career
- Norrby IF

Senior career*
Years	Team	Apps	(Gls)
2016–2020	Norrby IF	95	(16)
2021–2022	Degerfors IF	40	(9)
2022–2025	Hammarby IF	57	(8)
2024	→ Västerås (loan)	18	(7)
2025–	Albirex Niigata	16	(0)
2026–	→ Västerås (loan)	7	(0)

International career^{‡}
2019	Sweden U19	1	(0)
- * Club domestic league appearances and goals as of 8 July 2026 ‡ National team caps and goals as of 23:27, 27 July 2022 (UTC)

Abdelrahman "Abdo" Boudah (né Saidi, born 13 August 1999) is a Swedish footballer who plays as a winger or forward for Allsvenskan club Västerås, on loan from Albirex Niigata .

== Early life ==
He was born as Abdelrahman Saidi in Gothenburg, Sweden, to Algerian parents. He moved to Borås at a young age and started to play youth football with local club Norrby IF. In 2023, he decided to represent his mother's surname, and now plays with Boudah on his jersey.

== Club career ==
=== Norrby IF ===
Before the start of the 2017 season, Boudah was promoted to Norrby's first team. On 21 May, he made his debut in Superettan, Sweden's second tier, in a 2–1 away win against IFK Värnamo. On 27 May, he scored his first competitive goal for the club in a 3–0 home win against IK Frej. He ended the 2017 season making 17 league appearances, scoring twice, reportedly attracting interest from Allsvenskan clubs AIK, BK Häcken and IF Elfsborg.

On 1 August 2018, Boudah signed a new three-and-a-half-year contract with Norrby. Throughout the season, he established himself as a starter in Superettan, making 25 appearances and scoring three goals.

In 2019, Boudah made 27 appearances, scoring four goals, as Norrby finished 9th in the Superettan table. In 2020, Saidi played 26 league games and scored seven goals, as Norrby once again avoided relegation by finishing 11th in the table.

=== Degerfors IF ===
On 8 February 2021, Boudah transferred to newly promoted Allsvenskan club Degerfors IF, signing a three-year contract. He quickly broke into Degerfors' starting eleven, scoring four goals in 29 appearances as the club finished 13th in the table, avoiding the relegation play-offs by one place.

In 2022, Degerfors initially struggled at the bottom of the Allsvenskan table, although Boudah continued as a starter for the team. On 9 May, in an away game against GIF Sundsvall, Boudah scored his first hat-trick at senior level in just ten minutes, securing a 3–2 win for his side in stoppage time. In total, Boudah made 45 competitive appearances for the club across one and a half season, scoring 11 goals.

=== Hammarby IF ===
On 11 July 2022, Boudah transferred to Hammarby IF, signing a four-and-a-half-year contract. The transfer fee was reportedly set at around 5 million Swedish kronor.

=== Västerås SK ===
On 8 March 2026, Boudah was loaned out to newly promoted Allsvenskan side Västerås, on a deal for the 2026-season from the Japanese side Albirex Niigata.

== International career ==
On 14 October 2019, Boudah made his debut for the Swedish U19's, in a 3–2 friendly win against Norway.

== Career statistics ==
=== Club ===
As of 4 November 2023

Club	Season	League			Cup		Continental		Other		Total	
Club	Season	Division	Apps	Goals	Apps	Goals	Apps	Goals	Apps	Goals	Apps	Goals
Norrby IF	2017	Superettan	17	2	1	0	—		—		18	2
Norrby IF	2018	Superettan	25	3	4	0	—		—		29	3
Norrby IF	2019	Superettan	27	4	4	0	—		—		31	4
Norrby IF	2020	Superettan	26	7	1	0	—		—		27	7
Norrby IF	Total		95	16	10	0	—		—		105	16
Degerfors IF	2021	Allsvenskan	29	4	4	1	—		—		33	5
Degerfors IF	2022	Allsvenskan	11	5	2	1	—		—		13	6
Degerfors IF	Total		40	9	6	2	0	0	0	0	46	11
Hammarby IF	2022	Allsvenskan	17	3	1	0	—		—		18	3
Hammarby IF	2023	Allsvenskan	13	0	4	1	0	0	—		17	1
Hammarby IF	Total		30	3	5	1	0	0	0	0	35	4
Career total			165	28	21	3	0	0	0	0	186	31
