= Fredrik Hammar =

Swedish footballer

Personal information
- Full name: Fredrik Carl Michael Hammar
- Date of birth: 26 February 2001 (age 25)
- Place of birth: Sweden
- Height: 1.78 m (5 ft 10 in)
- Position: Central midfielder

Team information
- Current team: Mechelen
- Number: 6

Youth career
- 2005–2017: IF Brommapojkarna

Senior career*
Years	Team	Apps	(Gls)
2017–2018	IF Brommapojkarna	1	(0)
2018–2019	Akropolis IF	12	(4)
2019–2021	Brentford	0	(0)
2021	Akropolis IF	25	(0)
2022	Hammarby TFF	26	(7)
2022–2025	Hammarby IF	48	(1)
2025–	Mechelen	67	(1)

International career
2016–2018	Sweden U17	25	(4)
2018–2019	Sweden U19	5	(0)
- * Club domestic league appearances and goals as of 12:13, 7 November 2026 (UTC)

Fredrik Carl Michael Hammar (born 26 February 2001) is a Swedish professional footballer who plays as a central midfielder for Belgian Pro League club Mechelen.

Hammar is a product of the IF Brommapojkarna academy, Hammar began his senior career in earnest with Akropolis IF, whom he joined in 2018. Two years with Brentford B in England yielded just one first team appearance, before his return to Akropolis IF in 2021. Hammar joined Hammarby IF's feeder club Hammarby TFF in 2022 and played concurrently for both clubs during the 2022 season, before graduating to the parent club. He achieved a breakthrough into first team football and transferred to Belgian club Mechelen in 2025. Hammar won 29 caps and scored four goals for Sweden at youth level.

== Club career ==
=== IF Brommapojkarna ===
A holding midfielder, Hammar began his career in the academy at IF Brommapojkarna and received his maiden call into the first team squad for a Superettan match versus Åtvidabergs FF on 23 September 2017. With the match safe at 3–1, he made his senior debut as an injury time substitute for Jacob Ortmark. It proved to be Hammar's only senior appearance for the club and he departed the Grimsta IP in August 2018.

=== Akropolis IF ===
On 11 August 2018, Hammar dropped down to Division 1 to join Akropolis IF on an 18-month contract. During the remainder of the 2018 season, he made 13 appearances and scored four goals, before leaving the club in January 2019.

=== Brentford ===
On 29 January 2019, Hammar moved to England to join the B team at Championship club Brentford on an 18-month contract, with the option for a further year. He scored one of the goals in Brentford B's 4–0 2019 Middlesex Senior Cup Final victory over Harrow Borough and finished the 2018–19 season with 16 appearances and two goals.

Hammar was a part of the first team squad throughout much of the 2019–20 pre-season and after a period out injured, he made his debut as a late substitute for Jan Žambůrek in a 1–0 FA Cup third round victory over Stoke City on 4 January 2020. Hammar was promoted into the first team group for the 2019–20 season restart and the club took up the one-year option on his contract in July 2020.

Hammar was included in the first team group for the duration of the 2020–21 pre-season. Having failed to make a first team appearance so far during the 2020–21 regular season and with six months left on his contract, Hammar departed Brentford on 25 January 2021. During two years with the B team, he made 51 appearances and scored seven goals.

=== Return to Akropolis IF ===
On 25 January 2021, Hammar signed a one-year contract with former club Akropolis IF for an undisclosed fee. He made 27 appearances during a 2021 season which ended in relegation from Superettan through the relegation play-offs. Hammar signed a one-year contract extension in July 2021, but elected to depart the club in January 2022. Across his two spells with Akropolis IF, Hammar made 43 appearances and scored four goals.

=== Hammarby IF ===
On 29 January 2022, Hammar transferred to Ettan club Hammarby TFF. Having joined Hammarby IF's feeder club, Hammar was included in the parent club's first team group for its pre-season training camp in Marbella. During the 2022 season, he made 26 appearances and scored seven goals for Hammarby TFF, in addition to two Allsvenskan appearances for Hammarby IF. On 10 August 2022, Hammar signed a 2 1/2-year contract with Hammarby IF and he was included in the squad for its post-season training camp in Marbella.

As a result of having established himself in the starting lineup thus far during the 2023 season, Hammar signed a new 4 1/2-year contract on 18 August 2023. He finished the calendar year with 29 appearances and one goal, scored in a 2–1 win over Sirius on 9 July 2023. Hammar made 26 appearances during the 2024 season, which culminated in a runner-up finish. Hammar transferred out of the club in January 2025 and ended his three years at the Tele2 Arena on 59 appearances and one goal.

=== Mechelen ===
On 7 January 2025, Hammar transferred to Belgian Pro League club Mechelen and signed a 3 1/2-year contract for an undisclosed fee. He made 20 appearances during the remainder of the 2024–25 season. Hammar was named club captain in September 2025 and made 40 appearances during the 2025–26 season, in which the club missed European qualification on goal difference.

== International career ==
Hammar has been capped by U17 and U19 level. He was a part of Sweden's 2018 UEFA European U17 Championship squad and scored two goals in three appearances at the tournament.

== Personal life ==
Hammar grew up in Hässelby and also played floorball and ice hockey before deciding to concentrate on football. He is a Hammarby IF supporter.

== Career statistics ==
As of match played 9 August 2026

Appearances and goals by club, season and competition
Club	Season	League			National cup (Note: Includes Svenska Cupen, FA Cup, Belgian Cup)		League cup (Note: Includes EFL Cup)		Europe		Other		Total	
Club	Season	Division	Apps	Goals	Apps	Goals	Apps	Goals	Apps	Goals	Apps	Goals	Apps	Goals
IF Brommapojkarna	2017	Superettan	1	0	0	0	—		—		—		1	0
IF Brommapojkarna	2018	Allsvenskan	0	0	—		—		—		—		0	0
IF Brommapojkarna	Total		1	0	0	0	—		—		—		1	0
Akropolis IF	2018	Division 1	12	4	1	0	—		—		—		13	4
Brentford	2019–20	Championship	0	0	1	0	0	0	—		0	0	1	0
Brentford	2020–21	Championship	0	0	0	0	0	0	—		—		0	0
Brentford	Total		0	0	1	0	0	0	—		0	0	1	0
Akropolis IF	2020	—			3	0	—		—		—		3	0
Akropolis IF	2021	Superettan	25	0	1	0	—		—		1 (Note: Appearance in Superettan relegation play-offs)	0	27	0
Akropolis IF	Total		25	0	4	0	—		—		1	0	30	0
Hammarby TFF	2022	Ettan Norra	26	7	0	0	—		—		—		26	7
Hammarby IF	2022	Allsvenskan	1	0	5	0	—		—		—		6	0
Hammarby IF	2023	Allsvenskan	22	1	3	0	—		2 (Note: Appearances in Europa Conference League)	0	—		27	1
Hammarby IF	2024	Allsvenskan	25	0	1	0	—		—		—		26	0
Hammarby IF	Total		48	1	9	0	—		2	0	—		59	1
Mechelen	2024–25	Belgian Pro League	20	0	—		—		—		—		20	0
Mechelen	2025–26	Belgian Pro League	38	1	2	0	—		—		—		40	1
Mechelen	2026–27	Belgian Pro League	1	0	0	0	—		—		—		1	0
Mechelen	Total		59	1	2	0	—		—		—		61	1
Career total			171	13	17	0	0	0	2	0	1	0	190	13

== Honours ==
Brentford B

- Middlesex Senior Cup: 2018–19
