= Alper Demirol =

Swedish footballer (born 2002)

Personal information
- Full name: Alper Emre Demirol
- Date of birth: 1 October 2002 (age 24)
- Place of birth: Stockholm, Sweden
- Height: 1.84 m (6 ft 0 in)
- Position: Central midfielder

Team information
- Current team: GIF Sundsvall
- Number: 14

Youth career
- Hammarby IF
- Djurgårdens IF
- –2019: IF Brommapojkarna
- 2020–2021: Hammarby IF

Senior career*
Years	Team	Apps	(Gls)
2022–2025	Hammarby IF	29	(0)
2022–2023	→ Hammarby TFF (res.)	6	(0)
2024	→ Degerfors (loan)	12	(1)
2024	→ Skövde (loan)	8	(0)
2025–2026	Fatih Karagümrük	6	(0)
2026	Vanspor F.K	7	(0)
2026-	GIF Sundsvall	14	(0)

International career^{‡}
2022	Sweden U21	2	(0)
- * Club domestic league appearances and goals as of 12 November 2026 ‡ National team caps and goals as of 17:24, 16 October 2024 (UTC)

Alper Emre Demirol (born 1 October 2002) is a Swedish professional footballer who plays as a central midfielder for GIF Sundsvall.

== Early life ==
Born and raised in Stockholm, Demirol played youth football with Hammarby IF, Djurgårdens IF and IF Brommapojkarna. In 2021, he was part of Hammarby's U19 squad that finished second in the Swedish championship, after a 2–1 loss to IFK Göteborg in the national final.

== Club career ==
=== Hammarby IF ===
On 26 February 2022, Demirol made his competitive debut for Hammarby's senior team, in a 6–1 away in against Ytterhogdals IK in Svenska Cupen, the main domestic cup. On 22 July the same year, after making three substitute appearances in Allsvenskan, Demirol signed a two-and-a-half-year contract with Hammarby running until the end of 2024.

== International career ==
In November 2022, Demirol was called up to the Swedish under-21's for the first time, ahead of two friendlies against Denmark and Azerbaijan, and went on to appear in both matches.

== Personal life ==
His older brother Onur "Bolulu" Demirol is professional League of Legends player for LCS team Immortals.

== Career statistics ==
=== Club ===
As of match played 12 November 2023

Club	Season	League			National Cup (Note: Includes Svenska Cupen)		Continental		Total	
Club	Season	Division	Apps	Goals	Apps	Goals	Apps	Goals	Apps	Goals
Hammarby TFF	2022	Ettan	5	0	0	0	—		5	0
Hammarby TFF	2023	Ettan	1	0	0	0	—		1	0
Hammarby TFF	Total		6	0	0	0	0	0	6	0
Hammarby IF	2022	Allsvenskan	13	0	2	0	—		15	0
Hammarby IF	2023	Allsvenskan	16	0	6	0	1 (Note: Appearances in UEFA Europa Conference League)	0	23	0
Hammarby IF	Total		29	0	8	0	1	0	38	0
Career total			35	0	8	0	1	0	44	0
