= Jusef Erabi =

Swedish footballer (born 2003)

Personal information
- Date of birth: 8 June 2003 (age 23)
- Place of birth: Stockholm, Sweden
- Height: 1.83 m (6 ft 0 in)
- Position: Forward

Team information
- Current team: Preston North End (on loan from Genk)
- Number: 9

Youth career
- Rågsveds IF
- Stuvsta IF
- –2014: Älvsjö AIK
- 2015–2016: Hammarby IF
- 2016–2019: IF Stockholms Fotbollsakademi
- 2020: Hammarby IF

Senior career*
Years	Team	Apps	(Gls)
2020–2025	Hammarby IF	73	(19)
2020	→ IK Frej (loan)	7	(2)
2021–2022	→ Hammarby TFF (res.)	46	(16)
2025–	Genk	15	(1)
2026–	→ Preston North End (loan)	1	(1)

International career^{‡}
2021–2023	Sweden U19	10	(3)
2023–2024	Sweden U21	8	(4)
- * Club domestic league appearances and goals as of 15 August 2026 ‡ National team caps and goals as of 16:33, 16 October 2024 (UTC)

Jusef Erabi (born 8 June 2003) is a Swedish footballer who plays as a forward for EFL Championship club Preston North End, on loan from Belgian Pro League club Genk.

== Early life ==
Born and raised in Stockholm, Erabi played youth football with local clubs Rågsveds IF, Stuvsta IF, Älvsjö AIK, IF Stockholms Fotbollsakademi and Hammarby IF.

== Club career ==
=== Hammarby IF ===
In 2020, Erabi was sent on loan to IK Frej in Ettan, the domestic third tier, where he made his debut in senior football.

On 3 February 2021, Erabi scored in his debut for Hammarby's senior squad, in a 3–3 friendly draw against Akropolis IF. On 23 July the same year, he made his competitive debut for Hammarby, coming on as a substitute in a 3–1 home win against Maribor in the UEFA Europa Conference League. Throughout the year, he mostly played for affiliated club Hammarby TFF in Ettan, scoring five goals in 21 appearances.

On 10 August 2022, Erabi signed a two-and-a-half-year contract with Hammarby, running until the end of 2024. In 2022, he scored 11 goals in 25 league games for Hammarby TFF in the third tier, also making seven Allsvenskan appearances for the senior team.

In 2023, Erabi had his major breakthrough by scoring seven goals in 23 Allsvenskan appearances, although Hammarby disappointedly finished 7th in the table. He scored the only goal for his side in the second qualifying round of the 2023–24 UEFA Europa Conference League, where Hammarby was knocked out by FC Twente by 1–2 on aggregate after overtime. In early October, his season was cut short due to a foot injury that would keep him sidelined for the rest of the year. After the season, he vas voted Hammarby Player of the Year by the supporters of the club. Erabi was also nominated for the prize of Allsvenskan Young Player of the Year, that eventually was awarded to Momodou Sonko from BK Häcken.

On 23 December 2023, Erabi signed a new three-year contract with Hammarby.

=== Genk ===
Despite having attracted interest from clubs such as Millwall, on 2 September 2025 the Belgian side Genk completed their signing of Erabi on a 4 year contract.

=== Preston North End ===
On 13 July 2026, Erabi joined EFL Championship club Preston North End on a season long loan. Erabi scored a 93rd minute equaliser on his Preston North End debut in the League Cup first round tie against Huddersfield. He also scored a penalty in the penalty shoot-out victory.

== International career ==
On 4 September 2021, Erabi made his debut for the Swedish U19 in a 0–3 loss against Finland. In total, he won ten caps for the U19 team, scoring three goals, between 2021 and 2023.

On 19 June 2023, Erabi made his debut for the Swedish U21 in a 2025 UEFA European Under-21 Championship qualifier, scoring in a 5–0 away win against Gibraltar.

== Personal life ==
Erabi is of Afghan descent, and his father Wahid is a former player for the Afghanistan national football team.

== Career statistics ==
=== Club ===
As of 15 August 2026

Club	Season	League			National cup (Note: Includes Svenska Cupen, Belgian Cup)		Continental		Other		Total	
Club	Season	Division	Apps	Goals	Apps	Goals	Apps	Goals	Apps	Goals	Apps	Goals
Hammarby IF	2020	Allsvenskan	0	0	0	0	0	0	—		0	0
Hammarby IF	2021	Allsvenskan	2	0	0	0	2 (Note: Appearances in UEFA Europa Conference League)	0	—		4	0
Hammarby IF	2022	Allsvenskan	7	0	5	0	—		—		12	0
Hammarby IF	2023	Allsvenskan	23	7	5	4	2	1	—		30	12
Hammarby IF	2024	Allsvenskan	23	8	4	3	—		—		27	11
Hammarby IF	2025	Allsvenskan	18	4	4	1	4	1	—		26	6
Hammarby IF	Total		73	19	18	8	8	2	—		99	29
IK Frej (loan)	2020	Ettan	7	2	0	0	—		—		7	2
Hammarby TFF (loan)	2021	Ettan	21	5	0	0	—		—		21	5
Hammarby TFF (loan)	2022	Ettan	25	11	0	0	—		—		25	11
Hammarby TFF (loan)	Total		53	18	0	0	0	0	—		53	18
Genk	2025–26	Belgian Pro League	15	1	2	0	5 (Note: Appearances in UEFA Europa League)	0	—		22	1
Preston North End (loan)	2026–27	Championship	1	1	0	0	—		1 (Note: Appearance in EFL Cup)	1	2	2
Career total			142	39	20	8	13	2	1	1	176	50

== Honours ==
Individual

- Hammarby IF Player of the Year: 2023
