= Joel Nilsson =

Swedish footballer

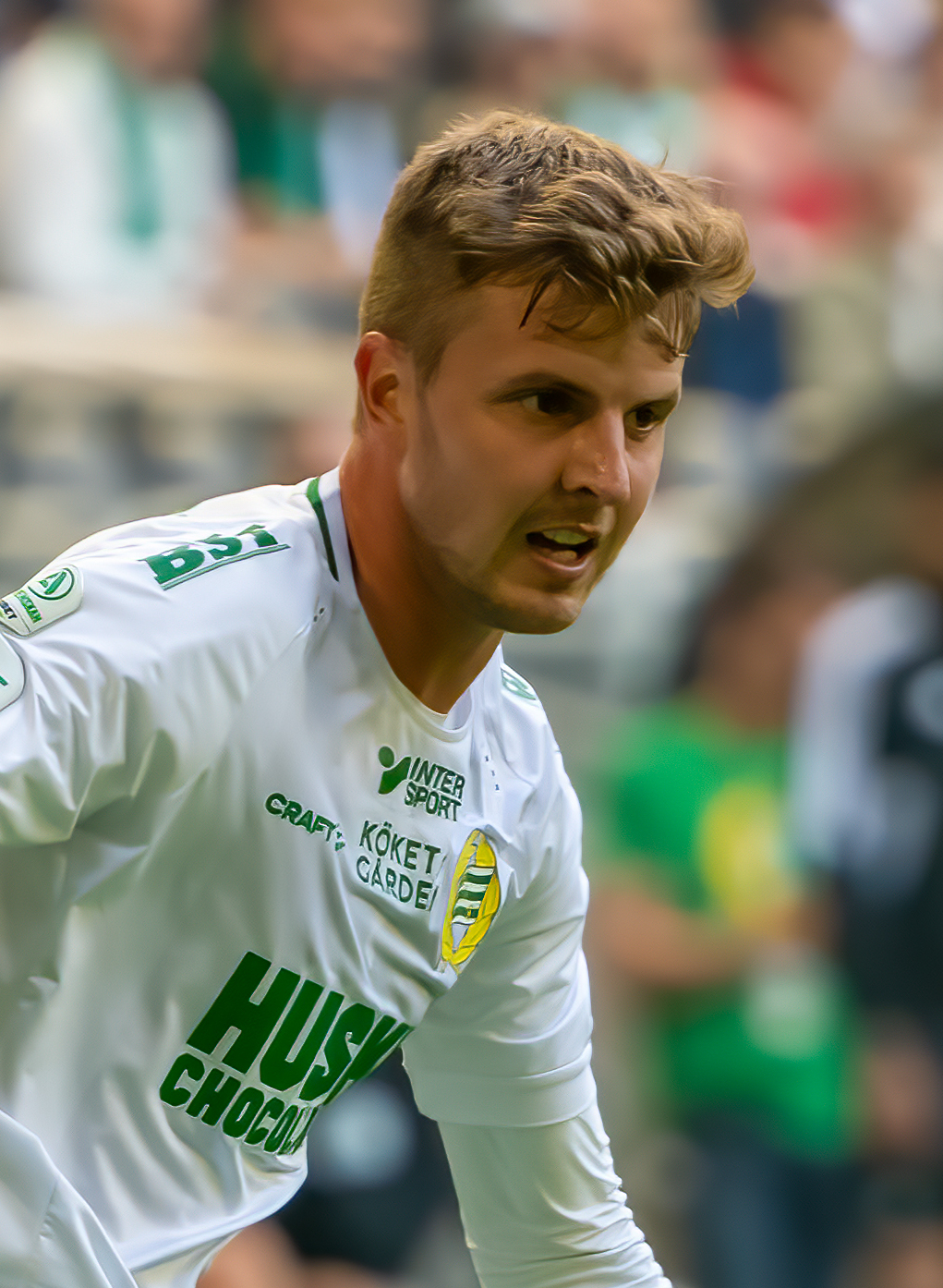
- Nilsson with Hammarby in 2022

Personal information
- Full name: Per Håkan Joel Nilsson
- Date of birth: 11 July 1994 (age 32)
- Height: 1.80 m (5 ft 11 in)
- Positions: Right wing-back; right midfielder

Team information
- Current team: Halmstad
- Number: 21

Youth career
- –2009: Pukaviks IF
- 2010–2013: Mjällby AIF

Senior career*
Years	Team	Apps	(Gls)
2014–2015	Kristianstads FF	44	(11)
2016–2021	Mjällby AIF	156	(29)
2022–2023	Hammarby IF	38	(5)
2024–2025	Kongsvinger	52	(6)
2026–	Halmstad	1	(0)
- * Club domestic league appearances and goals as of 9 July 2026

Per Håkan Joel Nilsson (born 11 July 1994) is a Swedish professional footballer who plays as a right wing-back or right midfielder for Halmstad.

== Club career ==
=== Kristianstads FF ===
Nilsson started to play football as a youngster with local club Pukaviks IF, before moving to the youth academy of Mjällby AIF at age 16.

In 2014, Nilsson signed with Kristianstads FF in Ettan, Sweden's third tier, where he made his debut in senior football. Across two seasons with the club, Nilsson made 44 league appearances and scored 11 goals.

=== Mjällby AIF ===
On 6 January 2016, Nilsson returned to his former club Mjällby AIF, also competing in Ettan.

In 2018, he helped the team win Ettan through 21 wins in 30 games, twelve points clear of second placed Oskarshamns AIK in the table. At the end of the season, Nilsson signed a new one-year deal with Mjällby.

In 2019, Mjällby won Superettan, the domestic second tier, as newcomers, through 17 wins in 30 games, two points clear of Varbergs BoIS. After the promotion, Nilsson signed a two-year extension with Mjällby.

In 2020, Mjällby finished fifth in Allsvenskan, and Nilsson provided six assists in 24 league games. In 2021, Nilsson scored five goals and provided five assists, as the club finished 9th in the table, reportedly attracting interest from other Swedish clubs like Djurgårdens IF, IFK Göteborg, IFK Norrköping and Hammarby IF.

=== Hammarby IF ===
On 4 December 2021, Nilsson signed a two-year contract with fellow Allsvenskan club Hammarby IF, effective in January 2022. During the first half of his debut season with the club, Nilsson was mostly placed on the bench by head coach Martí Cifuentes, before breaking in to the starting eleven after the summer break. He scored five goals in the last six league fixtures of the year, helping his side reach a 3rd place in the 2022 Allsvenskan. In 2023, Nilsson was used more sparingly, making 16 league appearances for Hammarby. On 12 November 2023, it was announced that he would leave the club at the end of the year following the expiration of his contract.

=== Kongsvinger ===
In March 2024, Nilsson joined Norwegian First Division club Kongsvinger on a two-year contract.

== Career statistics ==
=== Club ===
As of 27 August 2023

Appearances and goals by club, season and competition
Club	Season	League			Cup		Continental		Other		Total	
Club	Season	Division	Apps	Goals	Apps	Goals	Apps	Goals	Apps	Goals	Apps	Goals
Kristianstads FF	2014	Ettan	24	4	2	1	—		—		26	5
Kristianstads FF	2015	Ettan	20	7	5	1	—		—		25	8
Kristianstads FF	Total		44	11	7	2	0	0	0	0	51	13
Mjällby AIF	2016	Ettan	25	5	0	0	—		—		25	5
Mjällby AIF	2017	Ettan	24	9	0	0	—		2 (Note: Superettan promotion play-offs)	0	26	9
Mjällby AIF	2018	Ettan	24	5	0	0	—		—		24	5
Mjällby AIF	2019	Superettan	29	5	1	0	—		—		30	5
Mjällby AIF	2020	Allsvenskan	24	0	6	0	—		—		30	0
Mjällby AIF	2021	Allsvenskan	30	5	4	1	—		—		34	6
Mjällby AIF	Total		156	29	11	1	0	0	2	0	169	30
Hammarby IF	2022	Allsvenskan	22	5	6	1	—		—		28	6
Hammarby IF	2023	Allsvenskan	16	0	6	1	1 (Note: Appearances in UEFA Europa Conference League)	0	—		23	1
Hammarby IF	Total		38	5	12	2	1	0	0	0	51	7
Career total			238	45	30	5	1	0	2	0	271	50

== Honours ==
Mjällby AIF

- Superettan: 2019
- Ettan: 2018
