= Loret Sadiku =

Kosovan footballer (born 1991)

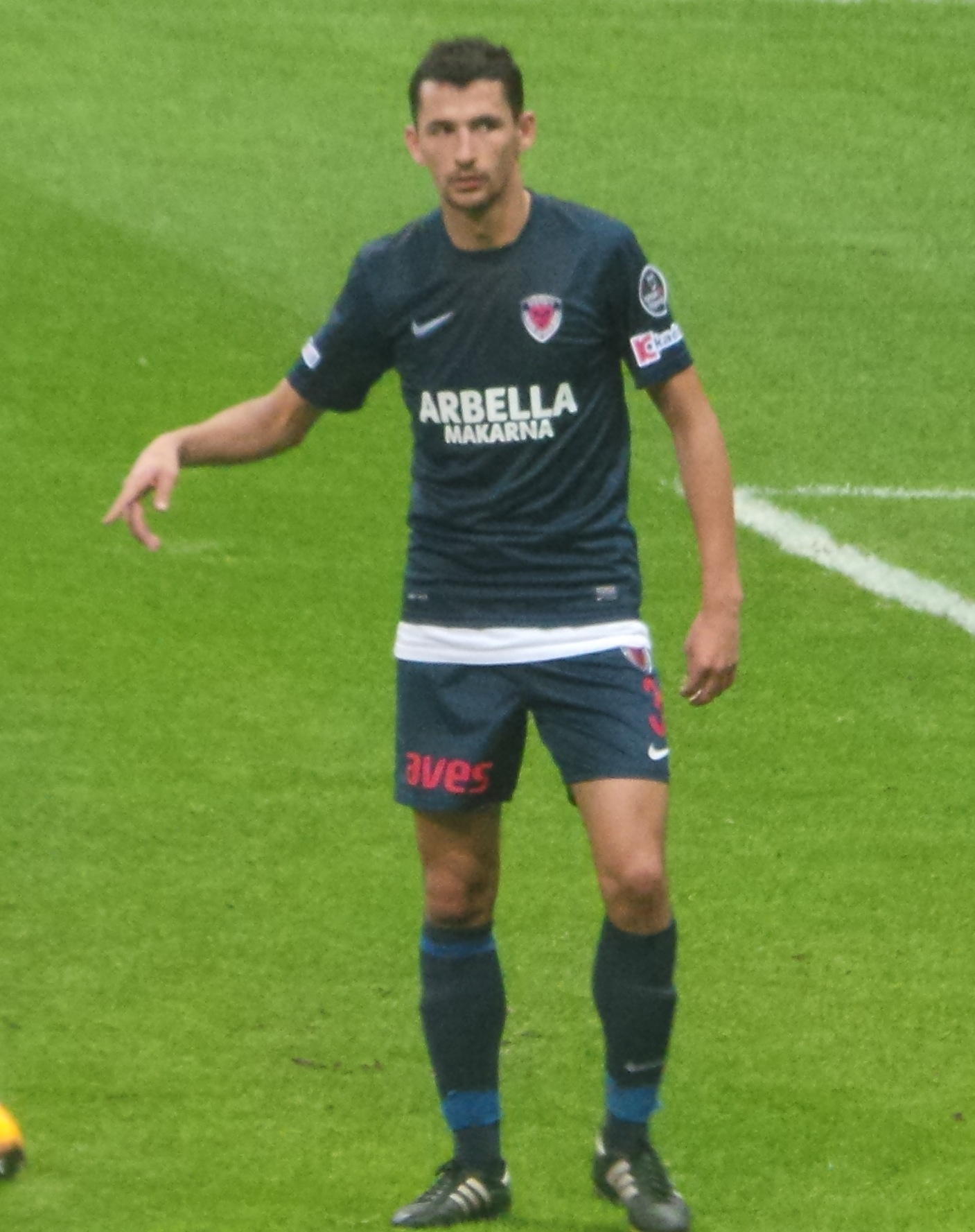
- Sadiku with Mersin İdman Yurdu in 2014

Personal information
- Full name: Loret Sadiku
- Date of birth: 28 July 1991 (age 35)
- Place of birth: Pristina, SFR Yugoslavia
- Height: 1.80 m (5 ft 11 in)
- Positions: Defensive midfielder; centre-back

Team information
- Current team: Helsingborgs IF
- Number: 26

Youth career
- 2002: Hånger IF
- 2003–2008: IFK Värnamo

Senior career*
Years	Team	Apps	(Gls)
2009–2011	IFK Värnamo	71	(2)
2012–2014	Helsingborgs IF	57	(3)
2014–2016	Mersin İdman Yurdu	55	(2)
2016–2022	Kasımpaşa	135	(2)
2022–2024	Hammarby IF	45	(1)
2024–2025	Kasımpaşa	23	(0)
2025	→ Adanaspor (loan)	3	(0)
2026–	Helsingborgs IF	11	(1)

International career^{‡}
2012	Sweden U21	3	(0)
2014–2015	Kosovo	4	(0)
- * Club domestic league appearances and goals as of 12 November 2026 ‡ National team caps and goals as of 13 November 2015

Loret Sadiku (born 28 July 1991) is a Kosovan professional footballer who plays as a defensive midfielder for Helsingborgs IF.

== Early life ==
Born in SFR Yugoslavia, Sadiku was raised in Sweden and started to play youth football with local club Hånger IF in Värnamo. In 2003, he joined the youth setup of IFK Värnamo, the town's biggest club.

== Club career ==
=== IFK Värnamo ===
In 2009, Sadiku was promoted to Värnamo's first team and made his professional debut in Ettan, Sweden's third tier. He was part of what would be known as a golden generation in the history of the club, together with players like Viktor Claesson, Simon Thern, Niklas Hult and Joseph Baffo. In 2010, Värnamo won a promotion to Superettan.

In 2011, led by head coach Jonas Thern, Värnamo finished 13th in the Superettan table. Sadiku made 29 league appearances, scoring twice, and appeared in both relegation play-off legs against Väsby United, which the club won by 3–0 on aggregate.

=== Helsingborgs IF ===
On 20 January 2012, Sadiku transferred to Allsvenskan club Helsingborgs IF. Two months later, he won the 2012 Svenska Supercupen with the club, through a 2–0 win against AIK. As defending Swedish champions, Helsingborg finished 6th in Allsvenskan, in which Sadiku made 19 appearances. Throughout the season, he also played five games in 2012–13 UEFA Champions League, before Helsingborg was knocked out in the play-off round by Celtic by 0–4 on aggregate.

In 2013, Sadiku played 27 league games, scoring twice, as Helsingborg finished 5th in the Allsvenskan table. Halfway through the 2014 season, after making 11 league appearances, Sadiku sought a move elsewhere and reportedly attracted interest from rival Malmö FF.

=== Turkish Süper Lig ===
On 28 June 2014, Sadiku signed a three-year contract with Mersin İdman Yurdu, newly promoted to the Turkish Süper Lig, together with Abdul Khalili from Helsingborg.

On 17 August 2016, Sadiku transferred to Kasımpaşa for a fee of €2 million, signing a three-year contract. On 12 January 2019, Sadiku signed a new three-and-a-half-year deal with the club.

=== Hammarby IF ===
On 18 February 2022, Sadiku signed a three-year contract with Hammarby IF in Allsvenskan, thus returning to Sweden after eight years abroad. Sadiku featured in the final of the 2021–22 Svenska Cupen, in which Hammarby lost by 4–5 on penalties to Malmö FF after the game ended in a 0–0 draw. In early July, Sadiku tested positive for COVID-19 and suffered from persistent symptoms that kept him sidelined for almost two months. He ended the season making 21 league appearances, helping his side to finish 3rd in the 2022 Allsvenskan table.

== International ==
=== Sweden ===
==== Under-21 ====
On 31 May 2012, Sadiku made his debut for Sweden U21 after being named in the starting line-up in a 2013 UEFA Under-21 qualification against Ukraine U21 and was nominated "Newcomer of the year".

=== Kosovo ===
On 2 March 2014, Sadiku received a call-up from Kosovo for the nation's first permitted by FIFA match against Haiti and made his debut after being named in the starting line-up.

== Career statistics ==
=== Club ===
As of 12 November 2023

Appearances and goals by club, season and competition
Club	Season	League			Cup		Continental		Other		Total	
Club	Season	Division	Apps	Goals	Apps	Goals	Apps	Goals	Apps	Goals	Apps	Goals
IFK Värnamo	2009	Division 1	21	0	1	0	—		—		22	0
IFK Värnamo	2010	Division 1	21	0	1	0	—		—		22	0
IFK Värnamo	2011	Superettan	29	0	0	0	—		2 (Note: Appearances in the Superettan relegation play-offs)	0	31	0
IFK Värnamo	Total		71	2	2	0	0	0	2	0	75	2
Helsingborgs IF	2012	Allsvenskan	19	0	0	0	—		1 (Note: Appearances in Svenska Supercupen)	0	20	0
Helsingborgs IF	2013	Allsvenskan	27	2	4	2	5 (Note: Appearances in UEFA Champions League)	0	—		31	4
Helsingborgs IF	2014	Allsvenskan	11	1	4	0	—		—		15	0
Helsingborgs IF	Total		57	3	8	2	5	0	1	0	71	5
Mersin İdman Yurdu	2014–15	Süper Lig	26	2	6	0	—		—		32	2
Mersin İdman Yurdu	2015–16	Süper Lig	29	0	0	0	—		—		29	0
Mersin İdman Yurdu	Total		55	2	6	0	0	0	0	0	61	2
Kasımpaşa	2016–17	Süper Lig	25	0	6	0	—		—		31	0
Kasımpaşa	2017–18	Süper Lig	30	0	0	0	—		—		30	0
Kasımpaşa	2018–19	Süper Lig	29	1	5	0	—		—		34	1
Kasımpaşa	2019–20	Süper Lig	9	0	0	0	—		—		9	0
Kasımpaşa	2020–21	Süper Lig	31	0	1	0	—		—		32	0
Kasımpaşa	2021–22	Süper Lig	11	1	0	0	—		—		11	1
Kasımpaşa	Total		135	2	12	0	0	0	0	0	147	2
Hammarby IF	2022	Allsvenskan	21	0	3	0	—		—		24	0
Hammarby IF	2023	Allsvenskan	24	1	5	0	2 (Note: Appearances in UEFA Europa Conference League)	0	—		31	1
Hammarby IF	Total		45	1	8	0	2	0	0	0	55	1
Career total			363	10	36	2	7	0	3	0	409	12
