= Jón Guðni Fjóluson =

Icelandic footballer (born 1989)

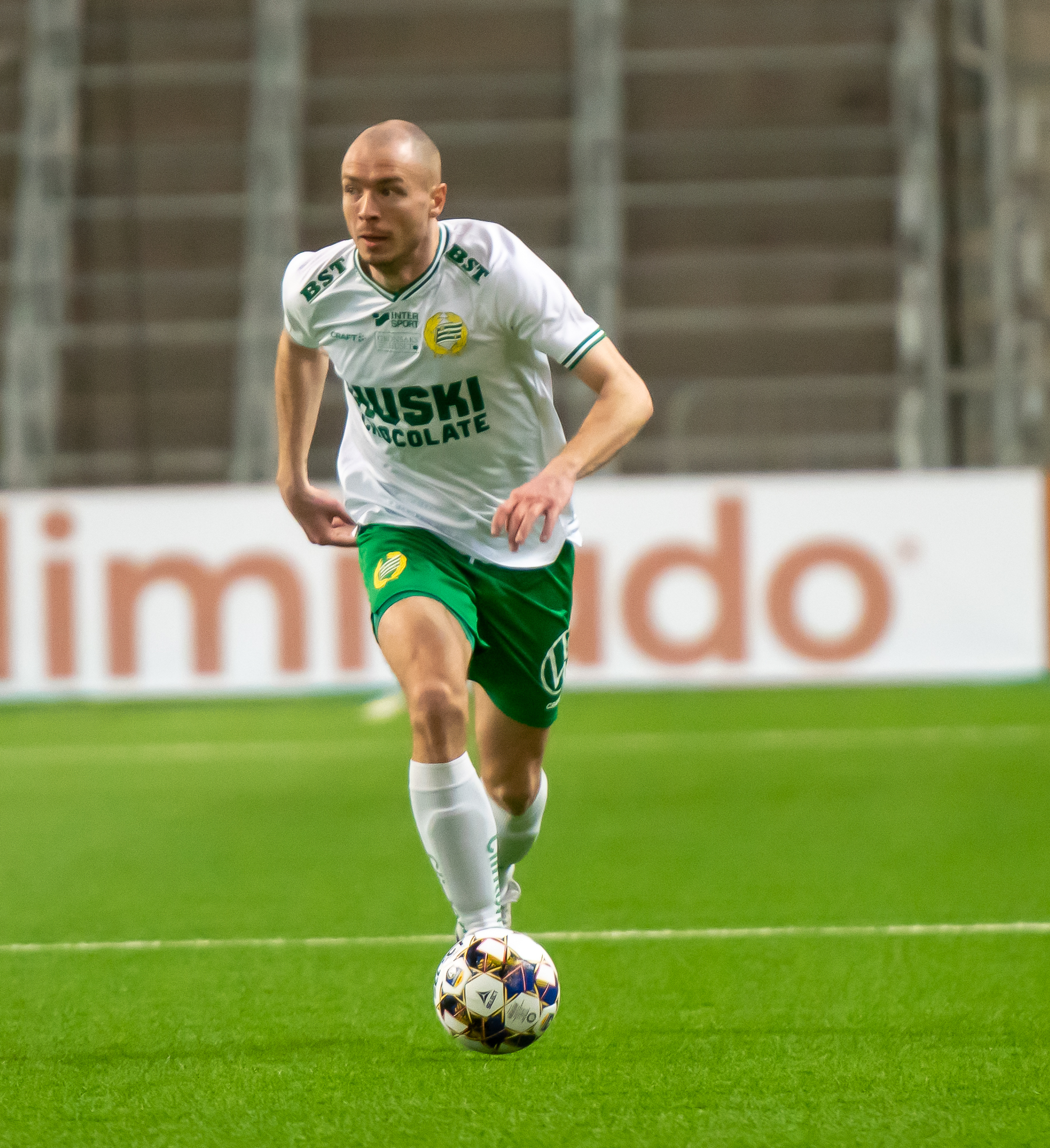
- Jón with Hammarby IF in 2021.

Personal information
- Full name: Jón Guðni Fjóluson
- Date of birth: 10 April 1989 (age 37)
- Place of birth: Þorlákshöfn, Iceland
- Height: 1.92 m (6 ft 4 in)
- Position: Centre-back

Team information
- Current team: Víkingur
- Number: 3

Senior career*
Years	Team	Apps	(Gls)
2007–2011	Fram	42	(10)
2011–2012	Beerschot	4	(0)
2012–2015	GIF Sundsvall	74	(2)
2016–2018	IFK Norrköping	59	(3)
2018–2020	FC Krasnodar	16	(0)
2020	Brann	11	(0)
2021–2023	Hammarby IF	21	(1)
2024–2025	Víkingur	17	(0)

International career^{‡}
2009–2011	Iceland U21	11	(0)
2010–2021	Iceland	18	(1)
- * Club domestic league appearances and goals as of 2 November 2024 ‡ National team caps and goals as of 8 September 2021

Jón Guðni Fjóluson (born 10 April 1989) is an Icelandic former professional footballer who played as a centre-back. He played for Beerschot, GIF Sundsvall, IFK Norrköping, FC Krasnodar, Brann and Hammarby IF. Jón Guðni had represented Iceland at senior level since 2010, making 18 appearances and scoring 1 goal in the process.

== Career ==
=== Fram ===
Jón started playing football at the Ægir Þorlákshöfn youth academy. In 2007, aged 18, he joined Fram in the Úrvalsdeild, Iceland's first tier. In 2010, he had trials with both Bayern Munich and PSV Eindhoven.

=== Beerschot ===
On 6 June 2011, Jón moved to Beerschot in the Belgian Pro League. Following the 2011–12 season, after being given limited playing time, he was allowed to leave on a free transfer.

=== GIF Sundsvall ===
On 24 August 2012, Jón signed a three-and-a-half-year contract with GIF Sundsvall in Allsvenskan, competing with Marcus Danielson and Stefan Ålander for one of the two centre-back positions. The club was relegated from Sweden's first tier the same year, through a play-off loss against Halmstads BK. In 2013, Sundsvall finished third in Superettan, as Jón only made ten league appearances due to injuries, but lost once again to Halmstads BK in the promotion play-offs.

In 2014, Jón established himself as a key player for GIF Sundsvall, being named Player of the Year by the Medelpad Football Association, as the club won a promotion through finishing second in the Superettan table. In 2015, Jón made 29 league appearances in Allsvenskan, scoring once, as the club finished 12th in the table.

=== IFK Norrköping ===
On 1 December 2015, Jón moved to IFK Norrköping on a free transfer, signing a three-year deal. He became the club's first new signing after winning the 2015 Allsvenskan. In 2016, Jón began the season as a starter, making 16 appearances as the club finished 3rd in the table, before getting injured in September and being ruled out for the rest of the season.

In 2017, IFK Norrköping reached the final of Svenska Cupen, the main domestic cup, but lost 1–4 against Östersunds FK. During the summer transfer window, Fjoluson reportedly attracted interest from Turkish club Konyaspor, but IFK Norrköping declined an offer of 5 million Swedish kronor. IFK Norrköping finished 6th in the Allsvenskan table and Jón ended the season by playing all 30 league games.

In January 2018, Belgian club Zulte Waregem put in a new offer worth 5 million Swedish kronor for Jón, but it was once again declined by IFK Norrköping. He continued as a starter, making 13 Allsvenskan appearances before leaving in the summer transfer window with six months left on his contract.

=== Krasnodar ===
On 10 August 2018, Jón transferred to FC Krasnodar in the Russian Premier League, signing a three-year deal. He saw his playing time limited at Krasnodar, and on 22 July 2020, manager Murad Musayev announced that he would leave the club by mutual consent.

=== Brann ===
On 22 September 2020, Jón joined SK Brann in the Eliteserien, on a deal until the end of the year. He made 11 league appearances for the side and helped the club out of the relegation battle; SK Brann eventually finished 10th in the table.

=== Hammarby IF ===
On 16 January 2021, Jón signed a three-year contract with Hammarby IF, thus returning to the Swedish Allsvenskan. On 30 May 2021, he won the 2020–21 Svenska Cupen, the main domestic cup, with the club through a 5–4 win on penalties (0–0 after full-time) against BK Häcken in the final. He featured in all six games as the side reached the play-off round of the 2021–22 UEFA Europa Conference League, after eliminating Maribor (4–1 on aggregate) and FK Čukarički (6–4 on aggregate), where the club was knocked out by Basel (4–4 on aggregate) after a penalty shoot-out, although Jón scored a brace in the second leg at home. On 3 October, in a 1–3 away loss against his former club IFK Norrköping, Jón suffered a cruciate ligament injury, expected to keep him sideline until the summer of 2022. On 22 July 2022, it was announced that Jón would not return to the field until 2023, due to a setback in his rehabilitation. In early 2023, however, it was confirmed that Jón would remain sidelined for the rest of the year. On 12 November 2023, it was announced that Jón would leave the club at the end of the year following the expiration of his contract.

=== Return to Iceland and retirement ===
On 18 December 2023, Jón signed a two-year contract with Víkingur in the Icelandic top-tier Besta deildin. He made 17 appearances in the Besta deild karla and featured in 15 European matches, contributing to Víkingur's progression into the league phase of the 2024–25 UEFA Conference League.

On 2 Apri 2025, Víkingur announced that Jón had decided to retire from professional football.

== International career ==
Jón played at the China Cup 2017, where Iceland won silver medals

== Career statistics ==
=== Club ===
As of 17 October 2023

Appearances and goals by club, season and competition
Club	Season	League			Cup		Other		Total	
Club	Season	Division	Apps	Goals	Apps	Goals	Apps	Goals	Apps	Goals
Fram	2009	Úrvalsdeild	17	5	0	0	4 (Note: Appearances in UEFA Europa League)	1	21	6
Fram	2010	Úrvalsdeild	17	5	2	0	0	0	19	5
Fram	2011	Úrvalsdeild	8	0	2	0	0	0	10	0
Fram	Total		42	10	4	0	4	1	50	11
Beerschot	2011–12	Belgian Pro League	4	0	0	0	0	0	4	0
Beerschot	Total		4	0	0	0	0	0	4	0
GIF Sundsvall	2012	Allsvenskan	6	0	0	0	1 (Note: Appearance in Relegation play-offs)	0	7	0
GIF Sundsvall	2013	Superettan	10	0	2	0	2	0	14	0
GIF Sundsvall	2014	Superettan	29	1	3	0	0	0	32	1
GIF Sundsvall	2015	Allsvenskan	29	1	0	0	0	0	29	1
GIF Sundsvall	Total		74	2	5	0	3	0	82	2
Norrköping	2016	Allsvenskan	16	1	4	0	2 (Note: Appearances in UEFA Champions League)	0	22	1
Norrköping	2017	Allsvenskan	30	2	5	1	4	0	39	3
Norrköping	2018	Allsvenskan	13	0	3	1	0	0	16	1
Norrköping	Total		59	3	12	2	6	0	71	5
Krasnodar	2018–19	Russian Premier League	6	0	3	0	2	0	11	0
Krasnodar	2019–20	Russian Premier League	10	0	1	0	6	0	17	0
Krasnodar	Total		16	0	4	0	8	0	28	0
SK Brann	2020	Eliteserien	11	0	0	0	0	0	11	0
SK Brann	Total		11	0	0	0	0	0	11	0
Hammarby IF	2021	Allsvenskan	21	1	6	0	6 (Note: Appearances in UEFA Europa Conference League)	2	33	3
Hammarby IF	2022	Allsvenskan	0	0	0	0	—		0	0
Hammarby IF	2023	Allsvenskan	0	0	0	0	0	0	0	0
Hammarby IF	Total		21	1	6	0	6	2	33	3
Career total			227	16	31	2	27	3	285	31

=== International goals ===
Scores and results list Iceland's goal tally first.

No	Date	Venue	Opponent	Score	Result	Competition
1.	27 March 2018	Red Bull Arena, Harrison, United States	Peru	1–1	1–3	Friendly

== Honours ==
=== Club ===
Hammarby IF

- Svenska Cupen: 2020–21
