= Dennis Collander =

Swedish footballer (born 2002)

Personal information
- Full name: Kjell Dennis Collander
- Date of birth: 9 May 2002 (age 24)
- Place of birth: Västerås, Sweden
- Height: 1.78 m (5 ft 10 in)
- Position: Midfielder

Team information
- Current team: GAIS
- Number: 34

Youth career
- –2012: Barkarö SK
- 2013–2017: Skiljebo SK

Senior career*
Years	Team	Apps	(Gls)
2018	Skiljebo SK	12	(1)
2019–2022	Örebro SK	36	(2)
2022–2026	Hammarby IF	14	(0)
2022	→ Hammarby TFF	2	(0)
2026–	GAIS	1	(0)

International career^{‡}
2017–2019	Sweden U17	22	(2)
2021	Sweden U21	3	(0)
- * Club domestic league appearances and goals as of 8 July 2026 ‡ National team caps and goals as of 17:25, 16 October 2024 (UTC)

Kjell Dennis Collander (born 9 May 2002) is a Swedish footballer who plays as a midfielder for Allsvenskan club GAIS.

== Early life ==
Collander was born in Västerås and started to play football as a youngster with local club Barkarö SK. At age 11, he moved to Skiljebo SK.

== Club career ==
=== Skiljebo SK ===
On 14 February 2018, aged 15, Collander was promoted to Skiljebo's senior team, competing in Division 2, Sweden's fourth tier. He played 12 league games throughout the season, scoring once, helping the club to finish 2nd in the table.

=== Örebro SK ===
On 17 January 2019, Collander transferred to Örebro SK in Allsvenskan, the domestic top tier. He signed a three-year deal with the club, after a successful trial. He spent most of the season sidelined, nursing an abdominal muscle injury.

On 5 July 2020, Collander made his debut for Örebro in Allsvenskan, in a 1–2 loss to IK Sirius, coming on as a late substitute. He ended the 2020 season making 15 league appearances for Örebro, that finished 7th in the Allsvenskan table.

On 10 February 2021, Collander signed a new three-year deal with Örebro. He made 21 league appearances, scoring twice, before his season was cut short in early October due to a knee injury. Collander was unable to save the club from suffering a relegation to Superettan, but was voted Örebro Player of the Year by the fans of the club.

=== Hammarby IF ===
On 12 January 2022, Collander transferred to Hammarby IF in Allsvenskan, signing a four-and-a-half-year contract until the summer of 2026. The transfer fee was reportedly set at around 4,5 million SEK. Collander featured in the final of the 2021–22 Svenska Cupen, in which Hammarby lost by 4–5 on penalties to Malmö FF after the game ended in a 0–0 draw. On 22 July 2022 after making five appearances in Allsvenskan, it was announced that Collander would be sidelined for several months due to an other knee injury, eventually leading to him missing the rest of the 2022 season. In May 2023, when he had returned to training, Collander suffered a cruciate ligament injury, expected to keep him sidelined for the rest of the year.

=== GAIS ===
On 30 June 2026, Collander joined fellow Allsvenskan side GAIS on a contract for the rest of 2026, with an option to extend with another three years.

== International career ==
Between 2017 and 2019, Collander won 22 caps for the Swedish national under-17 team, scoring twice. He briefly captained the side and was called up to the 2019 UEFA European Under-17 Championship, where Sweden was eliminated in the group stage.

On 3 June 2021, Collander made his debut for the Swedish national under–21 team, in a 2–0 win against Finland.

== Personal life ==
His father Conny Collander is a former footballer who represented Västerås SK between 1989 and 1996, mainly in the Swedish second tier, before he was forced to retire due to several knee injuries.

== Career statistics ==
=== Club ===
As of 31 October 2025

Club	Season	League			National Cup		Continental		Total	
Club	Season	Division	Apps	Goals	Apps	Goals	Apps	Goals	Apps	Goals
Skiljebo SK	2018	Division 2	12	1	0	0	—		12	1
Skiljebo SK	Total		12	1	0	0	0	0	12	1
Örebro SK	2019	Allsvenskan	0	0	2	0	—		2	0
Örebro SK	2020	Allsvenskan	15	0	3	0	—		18	0
Örebro SK	2021	Allsvenskan	21	2	3	0	—		24	2
Örebro SK	Total		36	2	8	0	0	0	44	2
Hammarby TFF	2022	Ettan	2	0	0	0	—		2	0
Hammarby TFF	Total		2	0	0	0	0	0	2	0
Hammarby IF	2022	Allsvenskan	5	0	1	0	—		6	0
Hammarby IF	2023	Allsvenskan	0	0	0	0	0	0	0	0
Hammarby IF	2024	Allsvenskan	7	0	1	1	0	0	8	1
Hammarby IF	2025	Allsvenskan	0	0	0	0	0	0	0	0
Hammarby IF	Total		12	0	2	1	0	0	14	1
Total			62	3	10	1	0	0	72	4

== Honours ==
=== Individual ===
- Örebro SK Player of the Year: 2021
