= Ismet Lushaku =

Swedish-born Kosovan footballer

Personal information
- Full name: Ismet Lushaku
- Date of birth: 22 September 2000 (age 26)
- Place of birth: Eskilstuna, Sweden
- Height: 1.76 m (5 ft 9 in)
- Position: Midfielder

Team information
- Current team: Västerås SK
- Number: 14

Youth career
- –2016: IFK Eskilstuna
- 2016–2019: AFC Eskilstuna

Senior career*
Years	Team	Apps	(Gls)
2019–2021	AFC Eskilstuna	65	(2)
2019	→ IFK Eskilstuna (loan)	1	(0)
2022–2023	Varbergs BoIS	47	(0)
2024–2026	IFK Norrköping	36	(2)
2026–	Västerås SK	7	(0)

International career^{‡}
2019–2021	Kosovo U21	10	(0)
2020–	Kosovo	2	(0)
- * Club domestic league appearances and goals as of 8 July 2026 ‡ National team caps and goals as of 9 June 2025

Ismet Lushaku (born 22 September 2000) is a professional footballer who plays as a midfielder for Allsvenskan club Västerås SK. Born in Sweden, he plays for the Kosovo national team.

== Club career ==
=== AFC Eskilstuna ===
On 2 May 2019, Lushaku signed his first professional contract with Allsvenskan side AFC Eskilstuna after agreeing to a three-year deal. Sixteen days later, he made his debut in a 1–1 home draw against Helsingborgs IF after coming on as a substitute at 60th minute in place of Wilhelm Loeper.

=== Varbergs BoIS ===
On 17 January 2022, Lushaku signed a four-year contract with Allsvenskan club Varbergs BoIS. His debut with Varbergs BoIS came on 19 February in the 2021–22 Svenska Cupen group stage against Sollentuna after being named in the starting line-up.

== International career ==
=== Under-21 ===
On 27 May 2019, Lushaku received a call-up from Kosovo U21 for 2021 UEFA European Under-21 Championship qualification matches against Andorra U21 and Turkey U21. Ten days later, he made his debut with Kosovo U21 in a match against Andorra U21 after coming on as a substitute at 66th minute in place of Mirlind Daku.

=== Senior ===
On 24 December 2019, Lushaku received a call-up from Kosovo for the friendly match against Sweden, and made his debut after coming on as a substitute at 32nd minute in place of injured Florian Loshaj.
