= Kalle Björklund (footballer, born 1999) =

Swedish footballer

Personal information
- Full name: Kalle Nils Björklund
- Date of birth: 31 May 1999 (age 27)
- Place of birth: Valencia, Spain
- Position: Centre-back

Team information
- Current team: Vasalund IF
- Number: 3

Youth career
- –2017: Valencia CF

Senior career*
Years	Team	Apps	(Gls)
2017–2018	Torre Levante	36	(0)
2018–2022	Hammarby IF	14	(1)
2020	→ IK Frej (loan)	5	(0)
2021	→ Falkenbergs FF (loan)	10	(1)
2021	→ Västerås SK (loan)	14	(0)
2022–2022	→ Hammarby TFF (res.)	4	(0)
2023	IFK Stocksund	28	(1)
2024–	Vasalund IF	38	(1)

International career
2017–2018	Sweden U19	2	(0)
- * Club domestic league appearances and goals as of 10 November 2026

Kalle Nils Björklund (born 31 May 1999) is a footballer who plays as a centre-back for Vasalund IF in Ettan. Born in Spain, he was a youth international for Sweden.

== Early life ==
Björklund was born in Valencia, Spain. He also lived in England and Italy before the age of six, due to his father Joachim Björklund being a professional footballer.

== Club career ==
=== Torre Levante ===
He started to play football with Valencia CF and was part of their youth academy up until 2017, when he moved to Torre Levante to start his professional career. Björklund made 36 appearances for the club in the 2017–18 campaign of Tercera División, Spain's fourth tier.

=== Hammarby IF ===
On 16 August 2018, Björklund signed a two and half-year deal with Hammarby IF in Allsvenskan, Sweden's top tier. He spent the vast majority of the 2018 and 2019 seasons nursing a serious knee injury.

In 2020, Björklund made his debut in Allsvenskan, playing 14 league games for Hammarby, as the club disappointingly finished 8th in the table. He also made one appearance in the second qualifying round of the 2020–21 UEFA Europa League, where Hammarby lost 0–3 to Polish side Lech Poznań.

On 21 January 2021, Björklund was sent on loan to Falkenbergs FF in Superettan, the Swedish second tier. On 12 July 2021, he was recalled by Hammarby, only to be immediately sent on loan to fellow Superettan club Västerås SK for the remainder of the year.

In 2022, Björklund made some appearances for Hammarby's affiliated club Hammarby TFF in Ettan, Sweden's third tier, but subsequently left the club at the end of the year.

=== IFK Stocksund ===
In early 2023, he signed with IFK Stocksund in Ettan.

== International career ==
Björklund was called up to the Sweden under-19 national team in March 2018, and featured in two qualification games to the 2018 UEFA European Under-19 Championship against Romania and Serbia.

== Personal life ==
Björklund also holds a Spanish citizenship. He is the son of former Swedish international footballer Joachim Björklund, and the grandson of football coach Karl-Gunnar Björklund.
