= Karl-Gunnar Björklund =

Swedish footballer (born 1953)

Kalle Björklund
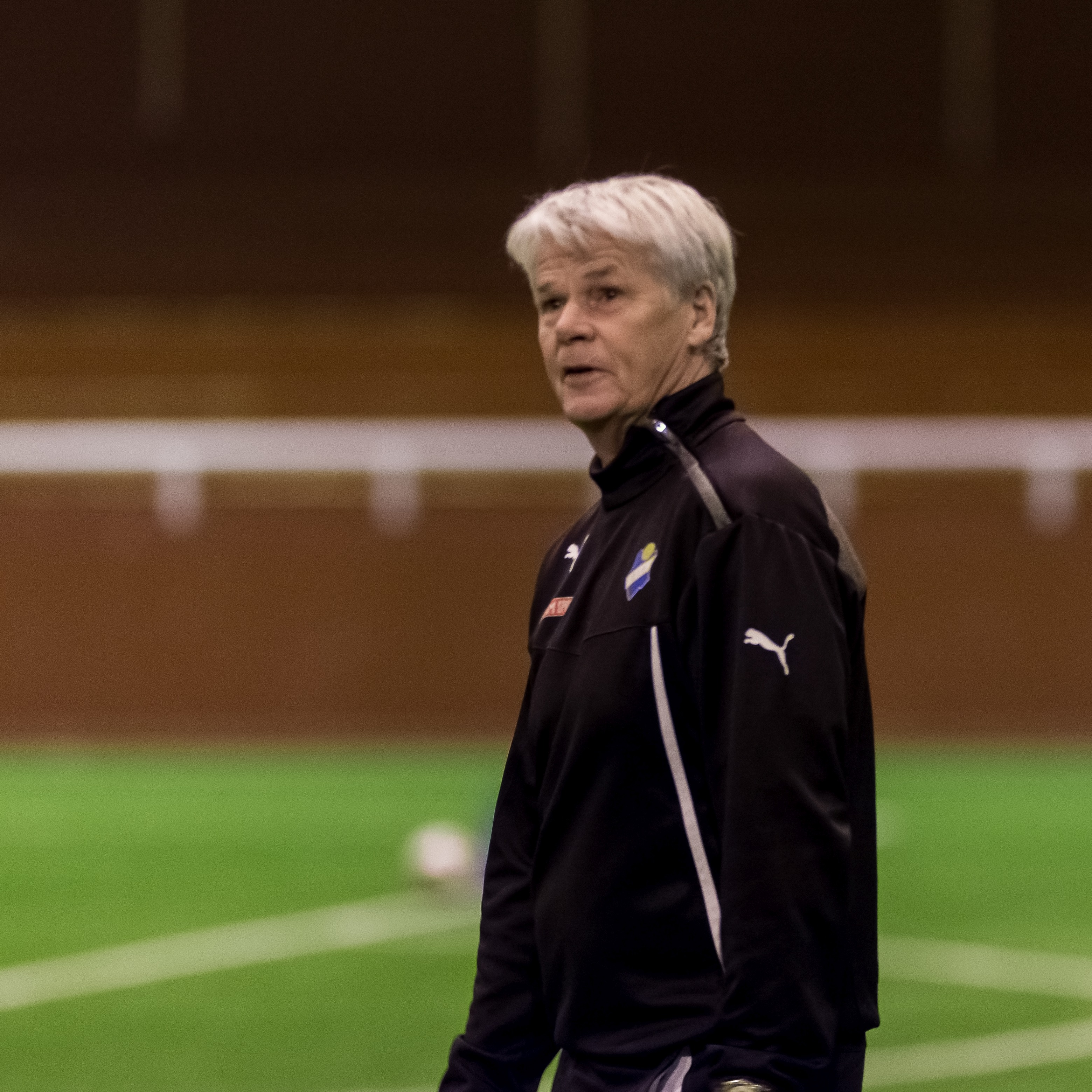
- Kalle Björklund in 2015

Personal information
- Full name: Karl-Gunnar Björklund
- Date of birth: 2 December 1953 (age 72)
- Place of birth: Växjö, Sweden
- Position: Midfielder

Team information
- Current team: Östers IF (assistant)

Youth career
- Växjö Norra IF

Senior career*
Years	Team	Apps	(Gls)
1973–1983	Östers IF	215	(24)
1984–1986	IFK Värnamo	20	(2)
Total		235	(26)

International career
1981–1982	Sweden	14	(1)

Managerial career
- 1991–1992: SK Brann
- 1993: Kalmar FF
- 1994–1997: Örgryte IS
- 1998–1999: IF Elfsborg
- 2001–2003: Molde FK (assistant)
- 2004: Larvik Fotball
- 2004–2005: Landskrona BoIS (assistant)
- 2008–2009: Östersunds FK
- 2010: IFK Östersund
- 2011–2012: Östers IF (assistant)
- 2013–2014: Helsingborgs IF (assistant)
- 2015–2016: Östers IF (assistant)
- 2017: Laholms FK (U16)
- 2017: Ängelholms FF (assistant)
- 2018: Örgryte IS (assistant)
- 2019: Laholms FK
- 2019–: Östers IF (assistant)
- * Club domestic league appearances and goals

Karl-Gunnar "Kalle" Björklund (born 2 December 1953) is a Swedish former football player and coach. He has served as coach in several clubs in Scandinavia. As a player, Björklund earned 14 caps for Sweden, and the midfielder won Allsvenskan with Östers IF three times. He is the father of Joachim Björklund.

== Playing career ==
Born in Växjö, Björklund started playing football in the local club Växjö Norra IF, before he moved to Östers IF as a youth-player. He won Allsvenskan with the club in 1978, 1980 and 1981. In total he played 215 matches and scored 24 goal for Östers IF. He later played for IFK Värnamo, where he played 20 matches and scored two goals. Björklund was capped 14 times and scored one goal while playing for Sweden.

== Coaching career ==
He started his coaching career at the youth department of Östers IF in 1987, before he moved on to Norwegian club Brann, where he was head coach in 1991 and 1992. After spells in Kalmar FF, Örgryte IS and IF Elfsborg, he started to in the Swedish Football Association as a youth developer.

He moved to Molde FK ahead of the 2001-season, where he became Gunder Bengtsson assistant coach. Molde FK finished second in Tippeligaen in 2002, but Bengtsson and Björklund got fired in May the next season, with the team positioned in 10th place with five points after six matches. Björklund then became head coach of Larvik Fotball ahead of the 2004-season, but he left Larvik after a half season with the Norwegian Second Division side. In November 2004 he was hired as Mats Jingblad's assistant coach of Landskrona BoIS, before both Jingblad and Björklund quit their job at Landskrona BoIS one year later, and Björklund returned to his old club IFK Värnamo as sports director.

Björklund later worked full-time as a sport teacher at the John Bauer school in Östersund and in the spring of 2008 he took over the coaching job at the third tier side Östersunds FK. After a losing streak at the start of the 2009 season he resigned from his post. For the 2010 season he was signed by local rivals IFK Östersund. In December 2010 he returned to his old club Östers IF as Roar Hansen's assistant coach. They left the position at the end of 2012 and Björklund followed Hansen to Helsingborgs IF in the following season. He then returned to Östers IF as assistant coach to Thomas Askebrand for the 2015 season. The duo left the club at the end of 2016.

On 1 February 2017, he took charge of Ängelholms FF. He left the position at the end of 2017. He was then working as an instructor at Osbecksgymnasiet in Laholm, a sports highs school (which he had worked for in 2006-2007 and then hired again since 2010) and as head coach of Laholms FK's U16 team. In September 2018, Kalle was reunited with Thomas Askebrand when he was hired as his assistant at Örgryte IS.

He left the club at the end of 2018 to become head coach of Laholms FK He left the position in July 2019 and returned to Östers IF once again as assistant coach to newly appointed head coach Denis Velić.

== Personal life ==
Kalle Björklund is the father of the former Swedish international player Joachim Björklund.
