= Oliver Alfonsi =

Swedish footballer

Personal information
- Date of birth: 3 June 2003 (age 23)
- Height: 1.80 m (5 ft 11 in)
- Position: Midfielder

Team information
- Current team: Varbergs BoIS
- Number: 14

Youth career
- –2020: Varbergs BoIS

Senior career*
Years	Team	Apps	(Gls)
2021–	Varbergs BoIS	87	(14)

International career^{‡}
2021	Sweden U19	1	(0)
- * Club domestic league appearances and goals as of 11 November 2026 ‡ National team caps and goals as of 18 July 2022

Dante Oliver Alfonsi (born 3 June 2003) is a Swedish professional footballer who plays for Varbergs BoIS.

He is a son of footballer and manager Joakim Persson.
