= Robin Tranberg =

Swedish footballer

Personal information
- Date of birth: 6 February 1993 (age 33)
- Place of birth: Stockholm, Sweden
- Height: 1.87 m (6 ft 2 in)
- Position: Midfielder

Team information
- Current team: Varbergs BoIS
- Number: 7

Youth career
- Haninge SK

Senior career*
Years	Team	Apps	(Gls)
2010–2011	Hammarby TFF	39	(1)
2011–2013	Hammarby	19	(0)
2012	→ Enköping (loan)	10	(0)
2014–2015	Varbergs BoIS	55	(7)
2016	GIF Sundsvall	18	(0)
2017–2019	Dalkurd	75	(5)
2020–	Varbergs BoIS	118	(7)

International career
2009–2010	Sweden U-17	15	(2)
2011–2012	Sweden U-19	9	(0)
- * Club domestic league appearances and goals as of 8 May 2025

Robin Tranberg (born 6 February 1993) is a Swedish professional footballer who plays for Varbergs BoIS, as a midfielder.

== Career ==
=== Varbergs BoIS ===
On 30 November 2019, Varbergs BoIS confirmed that they had signed Tranberg.
