= 2025 Hammarby Fotboll season =

Hammarby IF
2025 season
- Chairman: Mattias Fri
- Head coach: Kim Hellberg
- Stadium: Tele2 Arena
- Allsvenskan: 2nd
- 2024–25 Svenska Cupen: Quarter-finals
- 2025–26 UEFA Conference League: Third qualifying round
- Top goalscorer: League: Nahir Besara (17); All: Nahir Besara (17)
| Home colours | Away colours |

The 2025 season was Hammarby Fotboll 136th season in the club's history. During this season, the club participated in the Allsvenskan, Svenska Cupen, and UEFA Conference League.

== Players ==
=== First-team squad ===
As of 25 July 2025

Note: Flags indicate national team as defined under FIFA eligibility rules; some limited exceptions apply. Players may hold more than one non-FIFA nationality.

| No. | Pos. | Nation | Player |
|---|---|---|---|
| 1 | GK | SUR | Warner Hahn |
| 2 | DF | SWE | Hampus Skoglund |
| 3 | DF | DEN | Frederik Winther |
| 4 | DF | SWE | Victor Eriksson |
| 5 | MF | SWE | Tesfaldet Tekie |
| 6 | DF | SWE | Pavle Vagić |
| 7 | FW | SWE | Paulos Abraham |
| 8 | MF | SWE | Markus Karlsson |
| 9 | FW | SWE | Jusef Erabi |
| 11 | MF | SWE | Oscar Johansson Schellhas |
| 13 | DF | SWE | Jonathan Karlsson |
| 14 | MF | SWE | Dennis Collander |
| 15 | MF | SWE | Adrian Lahdo |
| 16 | MF | ALB | Gent Elezaj |

| No. | Pos. | Nation | Player |
|---|---|---|---|
| 17 | DF | GUI | Ibrahima Breze Fofana |
| 19 | DF | SUR | Shaquille Pinas |
| 20 | MF | SWE | Nahir Besara (captain) |
| 21 | DF | SWE | Simon Strand |
| 22 | MF | SWE | Jacob Ortmark |
| 25 | GK | SWE | Elton Fischerström |
| 26 | FW | IRQ | Montader Madjed |
| 27 | GK | SWE | Felix Jakobsson |
| 28 | MF | GHA | Frank Adjei |
| 29 | FW | CIV | Elohim Kaboré |
| 32 | FW | GHA | Bernard Acheampong |
| 34 | MF | SWE | Wilson Lindberg |

=== Out on loan ===
As of 15 July 2025

Note: Flags indicate national team as defined under FIFA eligibility rules; some limited exceptions apply. Players may hold more than one non-FIFA nationality.

| No. | Pos. | Nation | Player |
|---|---|---|---|
| 7 | FW | MNE | Viktor Đukanović (at FC DAC 1904 Dunajská Streda until 31 December 2025) |

=== Youth players with first-team experience ===
As of 30 March 2025 (Note: Current youth players who at least have sat on the bench in a competitive match.)

Note: Flags indicate national team as defined under FIFA eligibility rules; some limited exceptions apply. Players may hold more than one non-FIFA nationality.

| No. / Pos. / Nation / Player | No. / Pos. / Nation / Player |

=== Retired numbers ===
Note: Flags indicate national team as defined under FIFA eligibility rules; some limited exceptions apply. Players may hold more than one non-FIFA nationality.

| No. | Pos. | Nation | Player |
|---|---|---|---|
| 10 | MF | SWE | Kennedy Bakircioglu (until 2029) |
| 12 | 12 | | Fans of the club |

== Non-competitive ==
=== Club Friendlies ===
| 20 January 2025 Friendly | Puskás Akadémia (Hungary) | 3–2 | (Sweden) Hammarby | Felcsút |
| 16:30 | Szolnoki 9'; Golla 51'; Duarte 71'; Ákos Markgráf (red card) 90+5' | Report | Abraham 27'; Boudah 65'; Madjed (red card) 90+5' | Stadium: Pancho Aréna |

| 21 January 2025 Friendly | Hammarby (Sweden) | 3–1 | (Hungary) DVTK | Stockholm |
| 15:30 | Clemmensen 16' 26'; Jonathan Gustav Karlsson 49'; Gyamfi (yellow card) 79' | Report | Vagić 58' (o.g.) | Stadium: 3Arena |

| 5 February 2025 Friendly | Seattle Sounders (United States) | 2–2 | (Sweden) Hammarby | Seattle |
| 15:00 | Ragen (yellow card) 20'; Ferreira 41'; Roldán 45+1'; Tolo (yellow card) 73' | Report | Jonathan Karlsson (yellow card) 24'; Boudah 59' 89' (yellow card) 74' | Stadium: Lumen Field |

| 6 February 2025 Friendly | Molde (Norway) | 1–0 | (Sweden) Hammarby | Molde |
| 16:00 | Daga 84' | Report | | Stadium: Aker Stadion |

| 14 March 2025 Friendly | Hammarby (Sweden) | 4–0 | (Sweden) Sirius | Stockholm |
| 13:15 | Erabi 15'; Besara 41' 45+2'; Abraham 57' | Report | | Stadium: 3Arena |

| 22 March 2025 Friendly | HJK (Finland) | 0–3 | (Sweden) Hammarby | Helsinki |
| 12:00 | | Report | Erabi 23'; Antzoulas 42' (o.g.); Besara 66' | Stadium: Töölö Football Stadium |

| 19 June 2025 Friendly | Hammarby (Sweden) | 8–3 | (Sweden) Haninge | Stockholm |
| 13:00 | Fofana 1' 60'; Elohim Kaboré 11'; Erabi 15'; Jonathan Karlsson 26'; Madjed 66' 69'; Emil Sadarangani 90+1' (pen.) | Report | Hamidović 71'; Mattias Bouvin 79'; William Miguel 83' | Stadium: 3Arena |

| 4 September 2025 Friendly | Brommapojkarna (Sweden) | – | (Sweden) Hammarby | Stockholm |
| | | | | Stadium: Grimsta IP |

== Competitive ==
=== Allsvenskan ===
==== Results summary ====
| Overall | | | | | | | | Home | | | | | | Away | | | | | |
| Pld | W | D | L | GF | GA | GD | Pts | W | D | L | GF | GA | GD | W | D | L | GF | GA | GD |
|---|---|---|---|---|---|---|---|---|---|---|---|---|---|---|---|---|---|---|---|
| 30 | 19 | 5 | 6 | 60 | 29 | +31 | 62 | 12 | 1 | 2 | 34 | 10 | +24 | 7 | 4 | 4 | 26 | 19 | +7 |

Last updated: 9 November 2025.
Source: worldfootball

===== Results by round =====
| Round | 1 | 2 | 3 | 4 | 5 | 6 | 7 | 8 | 9 | 10 | 11 | 12 | 13 | 14 | 15 |
|---|---|---|---|---|---|---|---|---|---|---|---|---|---|---|---|
| Ground | H | A | H | A | H | A | A | H | H | A | H | A | H | H | A |
| Result | W | W | W | L | W | D | W | D | W | D | W | W | W | W | L |
| Position | 2 | 2 | 1 | 2 | 2 | 3 | 3 | 2 | 3 | 4 | 4 | 2 | 1 | 1 | 2 |

Updated to match(es) played on 13 July 2025. Source: worldfootball
A = Away; H = Home; W = Win; D = Draw; L = Loss

==== League table ====
| Pos | Team | Pld | W | D | L | GF | GA | GD | Pts | Qualification or relegation |
|---|---|---|---|---|---|---|---|---|---|---|
| 1 | Mjällby AIF (C) | 30 | 23 | 6 | 1 | 57 | 18 | +39 | 75 | Qualification for the Champions League second qualifying round |
| 2 | Hammarby IF | 30 | 19 | 5 | 6 | 60 | 29 | +31 | 62 | Qualification for the Europa League second qualifying round (Note: The 2025–26 Svenska Cupen winners qualifies for the Europa League second qualifying round. Since the cup winners (Mjällby AIF) qualified based on league position, the Europa League spot was passed to the second-placed team, and the second Conference League second qualifying round spot was passed to the fourth-placed team.) |
| 3 | GAIS | 30 | 14 | 10 | 6 | 45 | 30 | +15 | 52 | Qualification for the Conference League second qualifying round |
| 4 | IFK Göteborg | 30 | 16 | 3 | 11 | 41 | 33 | +8 | 51 | Qualification for the Conference League second qualifying round |
| 5 | Djurgårdens IF | 30 | 13 | 10 | 7 | 52 | 32 | +20 | 49 | |

Source: svenskfotboll.se (in Swedish)
Rules for classification: 1) Points; 2) Goal difference; 3) Goals scored; 4) Head-to-head points; 5) Head-to-head goal difference; 6) Head-to-head away goals scored; 7) Play-off
(Note: Play-off is only played if need to decide champion, teams for relegation or UEFA competition and will be played on a neutral ground).
(C) Champions

==== Matches ====
| 30 March 2025 1 | Hammarby | 4-0 | IFK Göteborg | Stockholm |
| 15:00 | Karlsson 21'; Erabi 42'; Pinas (yellow card) 52'; Besara 73'; Strand 85' | Report | Erlingmark (yellow card) 39'; Tolf (yellow card) 45+2'; Heintz (yellow card) 60' | Stadium: 3Arena; Attendance: 30,217; Referee: (Sweden) Oscar Johnson |

| 6 April 2025 2 | IF Brommapojkarna | 0-2 | Hammarby | Stockholm |
| 15:00 | Alladoh (yellow card) 14'; Zandén (yellow card) 30'; Lind (yellow card) 76'; Ackermann (yellow card) 79' | Report | Eriksson (yellow card) 43'; Pinas 55'; Tekie (yellow card) 66'; Besara 90+2' | Stadium: Grimsta IP; Attendance: 4,254; Referee: (Sweden) Glenn Nyberg |

| 13 April 2025 3 | Hammarby | 2-0 | Djurgården | Stockholm |
| 14:00 | Erabi 41'; Karlsson (yellow card) 56'; Boudah 83'; Pinas (yellow card) 90+7' | Report | Sawo (yellow card) 29'; Stensson (yellow card) 87'; Haarala (yellow card) 90+6'; Priske (yellow card) 90+7' | Stadium: 3Arena; Attendance: 28,333; Referee: (Sweden) Kristoffer Karlsson |

| 18 April 2025 4 | Mjällby AIF | 3-1 | Hammarby | Hällevik |
| 15:00 | Johansson 7'; Norén (yellow card) 22'; Røjkjær 33'; Thorell 45+1'; Iqbal (yellow card) 56'; Gustafson (yellow card) 90' | Report | Madjed 17'; Strand (yellow card) 90' | Stadium: Strandvallen; Attendance: 5,941; Referee: (Sweden) Fredrik Klitte |

| 23 April 2025 5 | Hammarby | 2-0 | Malmö FF | Stockholm |
| 19:00 | Eriksson (yellow card) 32'; Tounekti 74'; Karlsson 85'; Tekie (yellow card) 90+3' | [ | Johnsen (yellow card) 9'; Hakšabanović (yellow card) 73' | Stadium: 3Arena; Attendance: 27,884; Referee: (Sweden) Mohammed Al-Hakim |

| 27 April 2025 6 | BK Häcken | 1-1 | Hammarby | Gothenburg |
| 14:00 | Filip Öhman (yellow card) 53'; Lindberg (yellow card) 57'; Andersen 87' | Report | Erabi (yellow card) 34'; Elohim Kaboré 90' | Stadium: Nordic Wellness Arena; Attendance: 6,316; Referee: (Sweden) Granit Maqedonci |

| 4 May 2025 7 | Östers IF | 0-3 | Hammarby | Växjö |
| 16:30 | Söderberg (yellow card) 69'; Lukas Bergquist (yellow card) 90' | Report | Abraham 23'; Besara 28' 43' | Stadium: Spiris Arena; Attendance: 11,435; Referee: (Sweden) Richard Sundell |

| 11 May 2025 8 | Hammarby | 1-1 | IFK Norrköping | Stockholm |
| 14:00 | Tekie (yellow card) 11'; Vagić (yellow card) 31'; Madjed 33'; Pinas (yellow card) 57'; Boudah (yellow card) 90+2' | Report | Sigurgeirsson 15'; Kalley (yellow card) 67'; David Andersson (yellow card) 90+5' | Stadium: 3Arena; Attendance: 27,431; Referee: (Sweden) Victor Wolf |

| 14 May 2025 9 | Hammarby | 3-2 | Sirius | Stockholm |
| 19:00 | Eriksson 11'; Lindberg (yellow card) 20'; Besara 55'; Boudah 71' | [ | Milleskog 5'; Mamatsashvili (yellow card) 67'; Ure 68' (yellow card) 71' | Stadium: 3Arena; Attendance: 21,496; Referee: (Sweden) Adi Aganović |

| 18 May 2025 10 | AIK Stockholm | 0-0 | Hammarby | Stockholm |
| 14:00 | Celina (yellow card) 11'; Beširović (yellow card) 43'; Isherwood (yellow card) 90+2' | Report | Vagić (yellow card) 11'; Tounekti (yellow card) 12'; Boudah (yellow card) 90+2' | Stadium: Strawberry Arena; Attendance: 47,727; Referee: (Sweden) Mohammed Al-Hakim |

=== Group 2 ===
| Pos | Team | Pld | W | D | L | GF | GA | GD | Pts | Qualification | HAM | STI | KFF | VAR |
|---|---|---|---|---|---|---|---|---|---|---|---|---|---|---|
| 1 | Hammarby IF | 3 | 2 | 1 | 0 | 6 | 2 | +4 | 7 | Advance to Knockout stage | | | 2–1 | 1–1 |
| 2 | Stockholm Internazionale | 3 | 2 | 0 | 1 | 4 | 4 | 0 | 6 | | 0–3 | | 2–0 | |
| 3 | Kalmar FF | 3 | 1 | 0 | 2 | 4 | 5 | −1 | 3 | | | | | 3–1 |
| 4 | Varbergs BoIS | 3 | 0 | 1 | 2 | 3 | 6 | −3 | 1 | | | 1–2 | | |

Source: SvFF
Rules for classification: 1) Points; 2) Goal difference; 3) Goals scored; 4) Head-to-head record; 5) Lowest disciplinary points; 6) Highest ranked team

| 15 February 2025 Group 2 Match 1 | Hammarby | 1-1 | Varbergs BoIS | Stockholm |
| 14:00 | Abraham 19'; Besara (yellow card) 41' | Report | Hellman (yellow card) 37'; Alfonsi (yellow card) 57'; Nyarko 65'; Tranberg (yellow card) 90+2' | Stadium: 3Arena; Attendance: 18,461; Referee: (Sweden) Mohammed Al-Hakim |

| 22 February 2025 Group 2 Match 2 | FC Stockholm | 0-3 | Hammarby | Stockholm |
| 14:00 | David Zlotnik (yellow card) 57'; Eriksson (yellow card) 75' | Report | Erabi 65'; Abraham 70'; Boudah 90+6' | Stadium: 3Arena; Attendance: 8,283; Referee: (Sweden) Tess Olofsson |

| 3 March 2025 Group 2 Match 3 | Hammarby | 2-1 | Kalmar FF | Stockholm |
| 19:30 | Abraham 20'; Tounekti 45+2' | Report | Olusanya 11'; Zakarias Råvik (yellow card) 56' | Stadium: 3Arena; Attendance: 16,131; Referee: (Sweden) Victor Wolf |

=== Quarter-finals ===
| 9 March 2025 Quarter Final | IFK Göteborg | 4-0 | Hammarby | Gothenburg |
| 14:00 | Heintz 25'; Markovic 33' 72' 82'; Þórðarson (yellow card) 85' | Report | Fofana (yellow card) 6'; Pinas (yellow card) 73'; Erabi (yellow card) 90' | Stadium: Gamla Ullevi; Attendance: 26,190; Referee: (Sweden) Fredrik Klitte |

== See also ==
- 2025 Hammarby Fotboll (women) season
