= 2024 Hammarby Fotboll season =

Hammarby IF
2024 season
- Chairman: Mattias Fri
- Head coach: Kim Hellberg
- Stadium: Tele2 Arena
- Allsvenskan: 2nd
- Svenska Cupen: Group Stage
- Top goalscorer: League: Nahir Besara (10 goals); All: Nahir Besara (12 goals)
- Highest home attendance: 29,882 (31 March vs Kalmar FF, Allsvenskan)
- Lowest home attendance: 9,486 (26 February vs GIF Sundsvall, Svenska Cupen)
- Average home league attendance: 23,578
- Biggest win: Kalmar FF 1–4 Hammarby (2024-08-04); Djurgården 0–3 Hammarby (2024-06-02) Hammarby 3–0 IF Elfsborg (2024-04-15); Hammarby 3–0 IK Sirius FK (2024-05-26); Hammarby 3–0 Mjällby AIF (2024-07-28) IK Sirius FK 0–3 Hammarby (2024-10-26)
- Biggest defeat: Mjällby AIF 3–0 Hammarby (2024-05-15)
| Home colours | Away colours |

The 2024 season was the 135th season in the history of Hammarby Fotboll. During this season, the team participated in the following competitions: 2024 Allsvenskan, 2023–24 Svenska Cupen, and 2024–25 Svenska Cupen.

== Season overview ==
=== Pre-season ===
On 9 January, Hammarby's men's team together with the women's team started the pre-season with an open training for supporters to visit at Hammarby IP where each team had one half of the pitch.

On 16 January, it was reported that Hammarby reached an agreement to sign Oscar Johansson Schellhas from IFK Värnamo for a undisclosed fee.

On 22 January, the team began their training camp in Marbella, Spain. The women's team also participated in the camp, but overlapped with the men's team, arriving a bit later on February 5. All training sessions were held at Dama de Noche training facility, and both training sessions and matches were open to the public and media.

All training matches from Marbella were broadcast on Aftonbladet Plus.

Hammarby played 3 friendly matches in Marbella:

- On January 24, against Hungarian Diósgyőri VTK
- On January 25, against Norwegian Bodø/Glimt
- On February 4, against Norwegian Sarpsborg 08

On 27 January, Hammarby announced on their official website that Nathaniel Adjei has reached an agreement with French club FC Lorient. Hammarby stated on their website: "The deal is a loan with an option for Lorient to buy, triggered if certain sporting goals, outlined in the contract, are met. If not, Adjei could return to Hammarby in the summer. The French club also has the option to permanently purchase the central defender at any time during the loan period." The Swedish tabloid Expressen reported on the possible total transfer fee to be 65 million SEK if certain bonus criteria are met. Aftonbladet claimed the deal could be worth 80 million SEK.

On 1 February, Isak Vural left for Italian Serie A club Frosinone.

=== Svenska Cupen group stage ===
Between February 17 and March 4, 2024, Hammarby participated in the national cup, Svenska Cupen. The team was drawn into Group 7, with the draw taking place on November 25, 2023. Hammarby played all three of their matches at their home ground, Tele2 Arena. Initially, they were scheduled for two home matches and one away match. However, following a request from GIF Sundsvall, the match scheduled for February 26 was moved to Tele2 Arena. The request was made by GIF Sundsvall due to safety concerns about conducting the match at available local venues. The Swedish Football Association’s competition committee approved the change, with Hammarby being listed as the home team for this match. The match took place as scheduled, at 18:30 on February 26, 2024.

Hammarby was unable to advance from the group stage. They played 1 win, 1 draw, and 1 loss. They finished second in the group with 4 points, while Mjällby advanced from the group with 7 points.

== Squad ==
As of match played 10 November 2024

| No. | Name | Nationality | Position | Date of birth (age) | Signed from | Signed in | Contract ends | Apps. | Goals |
Goalkeepers
| 1 | Warner Hahn | (Suriname) | GK | 15 June 1992 (age 34) | Kyoto Sanga FC | 2024 | Dec 31, 2027 | 15 | 0 |
| 25 | Davor Blažević | (Sweden) | GK | 7 February 1993 (age 33) | Assyriska FF | 2018 | Dec 31, 2025 | 41 | 0 |
Defenders
| 2 | Hampus Skoglund | (Sweden) | DF | 1 March 2004 (age 22) | Hammarby TFF (res.) | Mar 15, 2024 | Dec 31, 2027 | 29 | 0 |
| 4 | Victor Eriksson | (Sweden) | DF | 17 September 2000 (age 26) | Minnesota United FC | Jul 2, 2024 | Dec 31, 2028 | 17 | 0 |
| 13 | Mads Fenger | (Denmark) | DF | 10 September 1990 (age 36) | Randers FC | Jul 15, 2017 | Jan 1, 2025 | 171 | 6 |
| 15 | Marc Llinares | (Spain) | DF | 26 August 1999 (age 27) | Albacete Balompié | Jul 22, 2023 | Jun 30, 2026 | 21 | 1 |
| 21 | Simon Strand | (Sweden) | DF | 25 May 1993 (age 33) | IF Elfsborg | Mar 7, 2023 | Dec 31, 2025 | 40 | 0 |
| 22 | Markus Karlsson | (Sweden) | DF | 20 January 2004 (age 22) | Hammarby TFF (res.) | Jan 1, 2023 | Dec 31, 2027 | 44 | 1 |
| 26 | Frederik Winther | (Denmark) | DF | 4 January 2001 (age 25) | FC Augsburg | Mar 27, 2024 | Dec 31, 2027 | 2 | 0 |
| 30 | Shaquille Pinas | (Suriname) | DF | 19 March 1998 (age 28) | Ludogorets Razgrad | Jul 15, 2022 | Dec 31, 2025 | 65 | 4 |
Midfielders
| 5 | Tesfaldet Tekie | (Sweden) | MF | 4 June 1997 (age 29) | Go Ahead Eagles | Feb 9, 2023 | Dec 31, 2026 | 45 | 6 |
| 6 | Pavle Vagić | (Sweden) | DF/MF | 24 January 2000 (age 26) | Rosenborg BK | Jul 15, 2022 | Dec 31, 2026 | 44 | 0 |
| 8 | Fredrik Hammar | (Sweden) | MF | 26 February 2001 (age 25) | Hammarby TFF (res.) | Jan 29, 2022 | Dec 31, 2027 | 48 | 1 |
| 11 | Oscar Johansson Schellhas | (Sweden) | MF | 6 May 1995 (age 31) | IFK Värnamo | Feb 1, 2024 | Dec 31, 2026 | 29 | 4 |
| 14 | Dennis Collander | (Sweden) | MF | 9 May 2002 (age 24) | Örebro SK | Jan 12, 2022 | Jul 14, 2026 | 12 | 0 |
| 17 | Ibrahima Breze Fofana | (Guinea) | MF | 15 August 2002 (age 24) | Hammarby TFF (res.) | Jan 30, 2023 | Dec 31, 2026 | 13 | 0 |
| 20 | Nahir Besara | (Sweden) | MF | 25 February 1991 (age 35) | Örebro SK | Feb 3, 2022 | Dec 31, 2025 | 156 | 46 |
| 28 | Bazoumana Touré | (Ivory Coast) | MF | 2 March 2006 (age 20) | ASEC Mimosas | Mar 4, 2024 | Dec 31, 2028 | 23 | 8 |
| 29 | Divine Teah | (Liberia) | MF | 19 April 2006 (age 20) | Nimba FC | | | 7 | 0 |
| 31 | Jardell Kanga | (Sweden) | MF | 13 December 2005 (age 20) | Bayer Leverkusen | Jul 13, 2024 | Dec 31, 2028 | 1 | 0 |
Forwards
| 9 | Jusef Erabi | (Sweden) | FW | 8 June 2003 (age 23) | Academy | Jan 1, 2022 | Dec 31, 2026 | 54 | 15 |
| 18 | Montader Madjed | (Iraq) | FW | 24 April 2005 (age 21) | Varbergs BoIS | Aug 10, 2022 | Dec 31, 2028 | 31 | 1 |
| 19 | Sebastian Clemmensen | (Denmark) | FW | 1 September 2003 (age 23) | B.93 | Aug 25, 2024 | Dec 31, 2028 | 3 | 1 |
Hammarby TFF (reserve team)
| 40 | Adrian Lahdo | (Sweden) | MF | 26 December 2007 (age 18) | Hammarby TFF (res.) | Jul 24, 2024 | Jun 30, 2027 | 2 | 0 |
| 38 | Gent Elezaj | (Albania) | MF | 11 April 2005 (age 21) | Hammarby TFF (res.) | Apr 4, 2023 | Dec 31, 2027 | 1 | 0 |
Out on loan
| 3 | Anton Kralj | (Sweden) | DF | 12 March 1998 (age 28) | Degerfors IF | | | | |
| 7 | Viktor Đukanović | (Montenegro) | FW | 29 January 2004 (age 22) | Budućnost | | | | |
| 16 | Marcus Rafferty | (Sweden) | MF | 1 October 2004 (age 22) | | | | | |
| 23 | Abdelrahman Boudah | (Sweden) | FW | 13 August 1999 (age 27) | Degerfors IF | | | | |
| 27 | Sebastian Selin | (Sweden) | GK | 11 January 2003 (age 23) | Västerås SK | | | | |
| 31 | Saidou Alioum | (Cameroon) | FW | 25 July 2003 (age 23) | | | | | |
| 34 | Alper Demirol | (Sweden) | MF | 1 October 2002 (age 24) | Academy | | | | |
| — | Kingsley Gyamfi | (Ghana) | DF | 15 March 2004 (age 22) | MŠK Žilina Africa F.C. | | | | |
| — | Amadou Sabo | (Niger) | MF | 14 September 2004 (age 22) | | | | | |
Left during the season
| 21 | Edvin Kurtulus | (Sweden) | DF | 5 March 2000 (age 26) | Halmstads BK | Ludogorets | | | |
| | Oliver Dovin | (Sweden) | GK | 11 July 2002 (age 24) | Academy | | | | |

== Pre-season and Friendlies ==
| 24 January 2024 | Hammarby | 0–0 | (Hungary) Diósgyőri VTK | Marbella, Spain |
| 16:00 | | Report | | Stadium: La Quinta Football Center |

| 25 January 2024 | Bodø/Glimt (Norway) | 3–2 | Hammarby | Marbella, Spain |
| 15:00 | Gulliksen 9'; Brunstad Fet 42'; Saltnes 88' | Report | Mikkelsen 37'; Boudah 39' | Stadium: La Quinta Football Center |

| 4 February 2024 | Hammarby | 4–5 | (Norway) Sarpsborg 08 | Marbella, Spain |
| 14:00 | Đukanović 7' 16' 61'; Boudah 53' | Report | Reinhardsen 35'; Meister 44'; Skipper 52'; Orjasaeter 63'; Andersen 78' | Stadium: La Quinta Football Center |

| 11 February 2024 | Hammarby | 1–2 | (Finland) HJK | Tele2 Arena, Stockholm |
| 13:00 | Fenger 62' (pen.) | Report | Keskinen 71'; Olusanya 81' (pen.) | Attendance: 2,906 |

| 9 March 2024 | BK Häcken | 2–1 | Hammarby | Gothenburg, Sweden |
| 14:00 | Hrstić 6'; Lindberg 17' | Report | Pinas 64' | Stadium: Gothia Park Academy |

| 15 March 2024 | Hammarby | 1–0 | Sandvikens IF | Stockholm, Sweden |
| 13:00 (UTC+1) | Madjed 48' | Report | | Stadium: Tele2 Arena; Attendance: 0 Referee: Fredrik Alknäs |

| 15 March 2024 | Hammarby | 1–3 | IFK Göteborg | Stockholm, Sweden |
| 16:00 (UTC+1) | Đukanović 66' | Report | Santos 21' 48'; Norlin 70' | Stadium: Tele2 Arena; Attendance: 0 Referee: Farouk Nehdi |

| 23 March 2024 | Hammarby | 2–0 | (Finland) KuPS | Stockholm, Sweden |
| 13:00 (UTC+1) | Gül (?); Boudah (?) | Report | | Stadium: Tele2 Arena; Attendance: 1,551; Referee: Erik Mattson |

| 16 April 2024 | IK Sirius (U21) | 0–2 | Hammarby (U21) | Uppsala, Sweden |
| 13:00 (UTC+1) | | Report | Madjed 32'; Touré (?) | Stadium: Studenternas IP |

| 23 June 2024 | IF Brommapojkarna | 3–1 | Hammarby | Stockholm, Sweden |
| 13:00 (UTC+1) | Irandust 36'; Vasic 39' 58' | | Teah 69' | Stadium: Grimsta IP; Referee: Jasmin Svraka |

| 24 June 2024 | Hammarby | 2–2 (Note: The match was played 2x60 min instead of 2x45 min.) | IFK Värnamo | Stockholm, Sweden |
| 13:00 (UTC+1) | Erabi 4' (?) | Report | Agyei 40'; Karlsson 100' (o.g.) | Stadium: Årsta IP; Attendance: 1,100; Referee: Mikael Hallin |

| 4 September 2024 | IK Sirius | 1–3 | Hammarby | Uppsala, Sweden |
| 13:00 (UTC+1) | Heier 60' | Report | Kanga (?); Elezaj (?); Clemmensen 89' | Stadium: Studenternas IP |

| 10 October 2024 | Hammarby | 2–3 | Sandvikens IF | Stockholm, Sweden |
| 13:00 (UTC+1) | Elezaj 50'; Söderström 87' | Report | Karlsson 5'; Sjöstrand 7'; Karlsson 28' | Stadium: Hammarby IP; Attendance: 100; Referee: Odai Alwani |

== Competitions ==
=== Allsvenskan ===
==== League table ====
| Pos | Team | Pld | W | D | L | GF | GA | GD | Pts | Qualification or relegation |
|---|---|---|---|---|---|---|---|---|---|---|
| 1 | Malmö FF (C) | 30 | 19 | 8 | 3 | 67 | 25 | +42 | 65 | Qualification for the Champions League first qualifying round |
| 2 | Hammarby IF | 30 | 16 | 6 | 8 | 48 | 25 | +23 | 54 | Qualification for the Conference League second qualifying round |
| 3 | AIK | 30 | 17 | 3 | 10 | 46 | 41 | +5 | 54 | Qualification for the Conference League second qualifying round |
| 4 | Djurgårdens IF | 30 | 16 | 5 | 9 | 45 | 35 | +10 | 53 | |
| 5 | Mjällby AIF | 30 | 14 | 8 | 8 | 44 | 35 | +9 | 50 | |

Source: svenskfotboll.se (in Swedish)
Rules for classification: 1) Points; 2) Goal difference; 3) Goals scored; 4) Head-to-head points; 5) Head-to-head goal difference; 6) Head-to-head away goals scored; 7) Play-off
(Note: Play-off is only played if need to decide champion, teams for relegation or UEFA competition and will be played on a neutral ground).
(C) Champions

==== Results summary ====
| Overall | | | | | | | | Home | | | | | | Away | | | | | |
| Pld | W | D | L | GF | GA | GD | Pts | W | D | L | GF | GA | GD | W | D | L | GF | GA | GD |
|---|---|---|---|---|---|---|---|---|---|---|---|---|---|---|---|---|---|---|---|
| 30 | 16 | 6 | 8 | 48 | 25 | +23 | 54 | 9 | 4 | 2 | 28 | 12 | +16 | 7 | 2 | 6 | 20 | 13 | +7 |

Last updated: 10 November 2024.

===== Results by round =====
| Round | 1 | 2 | 3 | 4 | 5 | 6 | 7 | 8 | 9 | 10 | 11 | 12 | 13 | 14 | 15 | 16 | 17 | 18 | 19 | 20 | 21 | 22 | 23 | 24 | 25 | 26 | 27 | 28 | 29 | 30 |
|---|---|---|---|---|---|---|---|---|---|---|---|---|---|---|---|---|---|---|---|---|---|---|---|---|---|---|---|---|---|---|
| Ground | H | A | H | A | A | H | H | A | A | H | H | A | A | H | A | H | A | H | A | H | A | H | A | H | A | H | H | A | H | A |
| Result | W | L | W | L | L | W | L | W | L | W | W | W | D | L | W | W | W | D | W | D | W | D | D | W | L | W | W | W | D | L |
| Position | 5 | 8 | 4 | 7 | 11 | 8 | 11 | 7 | 9 | 6 | 4 | 3 | 5 | 6 | 5 | 3 | 3 | 3 | 3 | 3 | 3 | 3 | 3 | 3 | 3 | 2 | 2 | 2 | 2 | 2 |

Updated to match(es) played on 10 November 2024. Source:
A = Away; H = Home; W = Win; D = Draw; L = Loss

===== Matches =====
| 31 March 2024 1 | Hammarby IF | 3–1 | Kalmar FF | Stockholm |
| 14:00 CET | Besara 14'; Sjöstedt 17' (o.g.); Skoglund (yellow card) 66'; Erabi 82' | Report | Hallberg 25'; Abdussalam Magashy (yellow card) 67' | Stadium: Tele2 Arena; Attendance: 29,882; Referee: (Sweden) Kristoffer Karlsson |

| 7 April 2024 2 | Malmö FF | 2–0 | Hammarby IF | Malmö |
| 14:00 CET | Berg Johnsen (yellow card) 18'; Kiese Thelin 34' 48' | Report | Kurtulus (yellow card) 43'; Erabi (yellow card) 65' | Stadium: Eleda Stadion; Attendance: 21,357; Referee: (Sweden) Adam Ladebäck |

| 15 April 2024 3 | Hammarby IF | 3–0 | IF Elfsborg | Stockholm |
| 19:10 CET | Johansson Schellhas (yellow card) 21'; Besara 49'; Đukanović 69'; Erabi 76' | Report | Holmén (yellow card) 6'; Baidoo (yellow card) 79' (yellow-red card) 81' | Stadium: Tele2 Arena; Attendance: 21,709; Referee: (Sweden) Glenn Nyberg |

| 21 April 2024 4 | BK Häcken | 2–1 | Hammarby IF | Gothenburg |
| 16:30 CET | Lindahl (yellow card) 15'; Gustafson 62'; Hovland 87' | Report | Kurtulus 30' | Stadium: Bravida Arena; Attendance: 6,073; Referee: (Sweden) Fredrik Klitte |

| 25 April 2024 5 | Halmstads BK | 2–1 | Hammarby IF | Halmstad |
| 19:00 CET | Al-Ammari (yellow card) 9'; Mohammed 45' (yellow card) 48'; Olsson (yellow card) 45+2'; Svedberg 53'; Gabriel Wallentin (yellow card) 76'; Ofosu-Ayeh (yellow card) 81' | Report | Pinas (yellow card) 17'; Hammar (yellow card) 84'; Tekie 90' | Stadium: Örjans Vall; Attendance: 5,712; Referee: (Sweden) Joakim Östling |

| 29 April 2024 6 | Hammarby IF | 2–1 | Västerås SK | Stockholm |
| 19:00 CET | Boudah 19' (yellow card) 34'; Pinas (yellow card) 26'; Besara 59' | Report | Åslund (yellow card) 28'; Gefvert 63' | Stadium: Tele2 Arena; Attendance: 21,662; Referee: (Sweden) Adi Aganović |

| 5 May 2024 7 | Hammarby IF | 1–2 | IFK Värnamo | Stockholm |
| 16:30 CET | Pinas 64'; Hammar (yellow card) 88' | Report | Bergh 49'; Näsström 68'; Emin Hasić (yellow card) 70'; Kotto (yellow card) 90+3' | Stadium: Tele2 Arena; Attendance: 20,116; Referee: (Sweden) Granit Maqedonci |

| 12 May 2024 8 | IFK Norrköping | 1–2 | Hammarby IF | Norrköping |
| 14:00 CET | Kalley (yellow card) 24'; Prica 33'; Traustason (yellow card) 40' | Report | Gül 16'; Tekie (yellow card) 36'; Pinas (yellow card) 52'; Marc Llinares 74' | Stadium: PlatinumCars Arena; Attendance: 13,356; Referee: (Sweden) Richard Sundell |

| 15 May 2024 9 | Mjällby AIF | 3–0 | Hammarby IF | Sölvesborg |
| 19:00 CET | Gustafson 24'; Jagne 25'; Bergström 43'; Abdoulie Manneh (yellow card) 81' | Report | Kurtulus (yellow card) 2'; Gül (yellow card) 21' | Stadium: Strandvallen; Referee: (Sweden) Victor Wolf |

| 19 May 2024 10 | Hammarby IF | 2–1 | AIK | Stockholm |
| 14:00 CET | Pinas 60'; Gül 74'; Hammar (yellow card) 87' | Report | Coulibaly (yellow card) 14' (yellow-red card) 64'; Pittas 79' | Stadium: Tele2 Arena; Attendance: 27,204; Referee: (Sweden) Kristoffer Karlsson |

| 26 May 2024 11 | Hammarby IF | 3–0 | IK Sirius | Stockholm |
| 14:00 CET | Pinas (yellow card) 17'; Touré 44'; Tekie (yellow card) 54' (goal) 57'; Đukanović 90' | Report | Castegren (yellow card) 89' | Stadium: Tele2 Arena; Attendance: 20,315; Referee: (Sweden) Fredrik Klitte |

| 2 June 2024 12 | Djurgårdens IF | 0–3 | Hammarby IF | Stockholm |
| 14:00 CET | Bergvall (yellow card) 14'; Bergvall (yellow card) 27'; Wikheim (yellow card) 55' | Report | Besara 15' (pen.) 29'; Vagić (yellow card) 26'; Touré 69' | Stadium: Tele2 Arena; Attendance: 27,344; Referee: (Sweden) Mohammed Al-Hakim |

| 7 July 2024 13 | GAIS | 0–0 | Hammarby IF | Gothenburg |
| 16:30 CET | Axel Henriksson (yellow card) 17'; William Milovanovic (yellow card) 44'; Joackim Aberg (yellow card) 48'; Amin Boudri (yellow card) 90+1'; Robin Frej (yellow card) 90+2' | Report | Gül (yellow card) 37'; Vagić (yellow card) 42' | Stadium: Gamla Ullevi; Attendance: 15,206; Referee: (Sweden) Victor Wolf |

| 15 July 2024 14 | Hammarby IF | 0–1 | IFK Göteborg | Stockholm |
| 19:00 CET | Touré (yellow card) 27'; Pinas (yellow card) 49'; Eriksson (yellow card) 79' | Report | Abraham 23'; Muçolli (yellow card) 43'; Hausner (yellow card) 58'; Santos (yellow card) 65'; Pettersson (yellow card) 88' | Stadium: Tele2 Arena; Attendance: 26,062; Referee: (Sweden) Joakim Östling |

| 20 July 2024 15 | IF Brommapojkarna | 0–2 | Hammarby IF | Stockholm |
| 17:30 CET | | Report | Touré 54'; Skoglund (yellow card) 69'; Erabi 72' | Stadium: Grimsta IP; Attendance: 3,657; Referee: (Sweden) Mohammed Al-Hakim |

| 28 July 2024 16 | Hammarby IF | 3–0 | Mjällby AIF | Stockholm |
| 16:30 CET | Besara 50' 59'; Johansson Schellhas 87' (pen.) | Report | Brorsson (yellow card) 35'; Rösler (yellow card) 86' | Stadium: Tele2 Arena; Attendance: 22,593; Referee: (Sweden) Fredrik Klitte |

| 4 August 2024 17 | Kalmar FF | 1–4 | Hammarby IF | Kalmar |
| 16:30 CET | Skrabb 83' | Report | Tekie 30'; Pinas 62'; Erabi 66'; Gül 90+2' | Stadium: Guldfågeln Arena; Attendance: 9,360; Referee: (Sweden) Granit Maqedonci |

| 12 August 2024 18 | Hammarby IF | 3–3 | IF Brommapojkarna | Stockholm |
| 19:00 CET | Pinas 5'; Touré 25' 30' (yellow card) 60' | Report | Eriksson 10' (o.g.); Abrahamsson (yellow card) 23'; Vasić 49' 72' | Stadium: Tele2 Arena; Attendance: 22,868; Referee: (Sweden) Oscar Johnson |

| 17 August 2024 19 | IFK Värnamo | 0–3 | Hammarby IF | Värnamo |
| 15:00 CET | Wenderson (yellow card) 35'; Engvall (yellow card) 62' | Report | Erabi 2'; Eriksson (yellow card) 37'; Winsth 63' (o.g.); Johansson Schellhas 88' | Stadium: Finnvedsvallen; Attendance: 3,241; Referee: (Sweden) Joakim Östling |

| 26 August 2024 20 | Hammarby IF | 0–0 | GAIS | Stockholm |
| 19:00 CET | Tekie (yellow card) 37' | Report | Harun Ibrahim (yellow card) 18'; Gustav Lundgren (yellow card) 21'; Ahl Holmström (yellow card) 71'; Axel Henriksson (yellow card) 90+1' | Stadium: Tele2 Arena; Attendance: 25,076; Referee: (Sweden) Mohammed Al-Hakim |

| 1 September 2024 21 | IFK Göteborg | 0–1 | Hammarby IF | Gothenburg |
| 16:30 CET | Nikolai Baden (yellow card) 56'; Erlingmark (yellow card) 73'; Þórðarson (yellow card) 86'; Carneil (red card) 87'; Bager (yellow card) 90+2' | Report | Pinas (yellow card) 56'; Hammar (yellow card) 59'; Touré (yellow card) 73'; Strand (yellow card) 81'; Erabi 90+11' | Stadium: Gamla Ullevi; Attendance: 17,151; Referee: (Sweden) Oscar Johnson |

| 16 September 2024 22 | Hammarby IF | 1–1 | IFK Norrköping | Stockholm |
| 19:00 CET | Erabi 45+2' | Report | Jesper Ceesay (yellow card) 68'; Hammershøy-Mistrati 87'; Prica (yellow card) 89' | Stadium: Tele2 Arena; Attendance: 21,302; Referee: (Sweden) Richard Sundell |

| 22 September 2024 23 | IF Elfsborg | 0–0 | Hammarby IF | Borås |
| 14:00 CET | Baidoo (yellow card) 23'; Holmén (yellow card) 30'; Frick (yellow card) 90+2' | Report | Eriksson (yellow card) 13'; Fofana (yellow card) 90+2' | Stadium: Borås Arena; Attendance: 11,017; Referee: (Sweden) Victor Wolf |

| 26 September 2024 24 | Hammarby IF | 2–0 | BK Häcken | Stockholm |
| 19:00 CET | Johansson Schellhas 32' 49'; Karlsson (yellow card) 63' | Report | Inoussa (yellow card) 45' | Stadium: Tele2 Arena; Attendance: 17,599; Referee: (Sweden) Adam Ladebäck |

| 29 September 2024 25 | AIK | 1–0 | Hammarby IF | Solna |
| 14:00 CET | Lamine Fanne (yellow card) 29'; Guidetti 90+2'; Thychosen (yellow card) 90+8' (yellow-red card) 90+8' | Report | Strand (yellow card) 90+8' (yellow-red card) 90+8' | Stadium: Strawberry Arena; Attendance: 47,129; Referee: (Sweden) Glenn Nyberg |

| 5 October 2024 26 | Hammarby IF | 1–0 | Halmstads BK | Stockholm |
| 15:00 CET | Touré 53' | Report | Agnero (yellow card) 45+1' | Stadium: Tele2 Arena; Attendance: 23,238; Referee: (Sweden) Tess Olofsson |

| 21 October 2024 27 | Hammarby IF | 2–0 | Djurgårdens IF | Stockholm |
| 14:00 CET | Besara 12' 30'; Tekie (yellow card) 90+3'; Strand (yellow card) 90+6' | Report | Šabović (yellow card) 37'; Priske (yellow card) 53'; Radetinac (yellow card) 90+1'; Nguen (yellow card) 90+7' | Stadium: Tele2 Arena; Attendance: 27,881; Referee: (Sweden) Fredrik Klitte |

| 26 October 2024 28 | IK Sirius | 0–3 | Hammarby IF | Uppsala |
| 15:00 CET | Lindberg (yellow card) 22' | Report | Touré 19' 37'; Tekie 71' | Stadium: Studenternas IP; Attendance: 10,080; Referee: (Sweden) Richard Sundell |

| 2 November 2024 29 | Hammarby IF | 2–2 | Malmö FF | Stockholm |
| 15:00 CET | Erabi 15'; Besara 43'; Tekie (yellow card) 79' | Report | Skogmar (yellow card) 24'; Zätterström 65'; Bolin 67'; Gabriel Busanello (yellow card) 79'; Ali (yellow card) 90' | Stadium: Tele2 Arena; Attendance: 26,175; Referee: (Sweden) Mohammed Al-Hakim |

| 10 November 2024 30 | Västerås SK | 1–0 | Hammarby IF | Västerås |
| 15:00 CET | Bouzaiene (yellow card) 11'; Granath 82' | Report | Pinas (yellow card) 59' | Stadium: Iver Arena; Attendance: 6,500; Referee: (Sweden) Oscar Johnson |

=== Svenska Cupen ===
==== Group 7 ====
| Pos | Team | Pld | W | D | L | GF | GA | GD | Pts | Qualification | MAIF | HAM | VSK | GIF |
|---|---|---|---|---|---|---|---|---|---|---|---|---|---|---|
| 1 | Mjällby AIF | 3 | 2 | 1 | 0 | 6 | 3 | +3 | 7 | Advance to Knockout stage | | | 2–0 | 3–2 |
| 2 | Hammarby IF | 3 | 1 | 1 | 1 | 5 | 4 | +1 | 4 | | 1–1 | | 1–2 | 3–1 |
| 3 | Västerås SK | 3 | 1 | 1 | 1 | 3 | 4 | −1 | 4 | | | | | 1–1 |
| 4 | GIF Sundsvall | 3 | 0 | 1 | 2 | 4 | 7 | −3 | 1 | | | | | |

Source: SvFF
Rules for classification: 1) Points; 2) Goal difference; 3) Goals scored; 4) Head-to-head record; 5) Lowest disciplinary points; 6) Highest ranked team

| 17 February 2024 1 | Hammarby IF | 1-2 | Västerås SK | Stockholm |
| 15:15 CET | Mikkelsen 12'; Fenger (yellow card) 62' | Report | Diabate 28'; Nsabiyumva (yellow card) 29'; Herman Magnusson (yellow card) 34'; Ahlinvi 39' | Stadium: 3 Arena; Attendance: 19,150; Referee: (Sweden) Richard Sundell |

| 26 February 2024 2 | Hammarby IF | 3-1 | GIF Sundsvall | Stockholm |
| 18:30 CET | Erabi 12' 90+1'; Besara 68' | Report | Yaqub Finey 7'; Edvard Carrick (yellow card) 26'; Hudu (yellow card) 33' | Stadium: 3 Arena; Attendance: 9,486; Referee: (Sweden) Adi Aganović |

| 4 March 2024 3 | Hammarby IF | 1-1 | Mjällby AIF | Stockholm |
| 18:30 CET | Besara 70'; Đukanović (yellow card) 72' | Report | Rösler (yellow card) 70'; Bergström 73'; Pettersson (yellow card) 76'; Brorsson (yellow card) 78'; Lundin (yellow card) 90+4' | Stadium: 3 Arena; Attendance: 15,584; Referee: (Sweden) Victor Wolf |

== Statistics ==
=== Goals ===
| Rank | Player | Allsvenskan | Svenska Cupen | Total |
|---|---|---|---|---|
| 1 | (Sweden) Nahir Besara | 10 | 2 | 12 |
| 2 | (Ivory Coast) Bazoumana Touré | 9 | 0 | 9 |
| 3 | (Sweden) Jusef Erabi | 8 | 2 | 10 |
| 4 | (Suriname) Shaquille Pinas | 4 | 0 | 4 |
| 5 | (Sweden) Tesfaldet Tekie | 4 | 0 | 4 |
| 6 | (Sweden) Oscar Johansson Schellhas | 4 | 0 | 4 |
| 7 | (Sweden) Deniz Gül | 3 | 0 | 3 |
| 8 | (Montenegro) Viktor Đukanović | 2 | 0 | 2 |
| 9 | (Norway) August Mikkelsen | 0 | 1 | 1 |
| 10 | (Spain) Marc Llinares | 1 | 0 | 1 |
| 11 | (Sweden) Edvin Kurtulus | 1 | 0 | 1 |
| 12 | (Sweden) Abdelrahman Saidi | 1 | 0 | 1 |

Source: FBREF
Source: Swedish Football Association

=== Clean sheets ===
| Rank | Player | Allsvenskan | Sv. Cupen | Total |
|---|---|---|---|---|
| 1 | (Suriname) Warner Hahn | 10 | 0 | 10 |
| 2 | (Sweden) Oliver Dovin | 5 | 0 | 5 |
| 3 | (Sweden) Davor Blažević | 0 | 0 | 0 |
| Total | | 15 | 0 | 15 |

Source: FBref
Source: Swedish Football Association

=== Disciplinary record ===
| N | P | Nat. | Name | Allsvenskan | | | Svenska Cupen | | | Total | | | Notes |
| N | P | Nat. | Name | Yellow card | Second yellow card | Red card | Yellow card | Second yellow card | Red card | Yellow card | Second yellow card | Red card | Notes |
| 30 | DF | (Suriname) | Shaquille Pinas | 7 | | | | | | 7 | | | |
| 5 | MF | (Sweden) | Tesfaldet Tekie | 5 | | | | | | 5 | | | |
| 21 | DF | (Sweden) | Simon Strand | 4 | 1 | | | | | 4 | 1 | | |
| 8 | MF | (Sweden) | Fredrik Hammar | 4 | | | | | | 4 | | | |
| 28 | MF | (Ivory Coast) | Bazoumana Touré | 3 | | | | | | 3 | | | |
| 4 | DF | (Sweden) | Victor Eriksson | 3 | | | | | | 3 | | | |
| 19 | FW | (Turkey) | Deniz Gül | 2 | | | | | | 2 | | | |
| 4 | DF | (Sweden) | Edvin Kurtulus | 2 | | | | | | 2 | | | |
| 6 | DF | (Sweden) | Pavle Vagić | 2 | | | | | | 2 | | | |
| 2 | DF | (Sweden) | Hampus Skoglund | 2 | | | | | | 2 | | | |
| 9 | FW | (Sweden) | Jusef Erabi | 1 | | | | | | 1 | | | |
| 11 | MF | (Sweden) | Oscar Johansson Schellhas | 1 | | | | | | 1 | | | |
| 23 | FW | (Sweden) | Abdelrahman Boudah | 1 | | | | | | 1 | | | |
| 17 | MF | (Guinea) | Ibrahima Breze Fofana | 1 | | | | | | 1 | | | |
| 22 | DF | (Sweden) | Markus Karlsson | 1 | | | | | | 1 | | | |
| 13 | DF | (Denmark) | Mads Fenger | | | | 1 | | | 1 | | | |
| | FW | (Montenegro) | Viktor Đukanović | | | | 1 | | | 1 | | | |

Source: https://www.svenskfotboll.se/serier-cuper/spelarstatistik/allsvenskan-2024/115560/
Only competitive matches
(yellow card) = Number of bookings; (second yellow card) = Number of sending offs after a second yellow card; (red card) = Number of sending offs by a direct red card.
