= List of Hammarby Fotboll players (50–99 appearances) =

This list is about Hammarby IF players with 50 to 99 league appearances. For players with at least 100 appearances, see List of Hammarby Fotboll players. For a list of all Hammarby IF players with a Wikipedia article, see Category:Hammarby Fotboll players. For the current Hammarby IF first-team squad, see First-team squad.

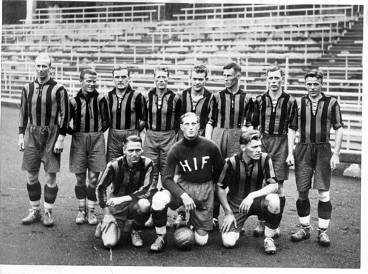
Hammarby Fotboll's first team squad in 1934

Hammarby IF Fotbollförening, commonly known as Hammarby Fotboll, is a Swedish professional football club founded in 1915 and based in Stockholm. The club is affiliated with Stockholms Fotbollförbund (The Stockholm Football Association), and plays its home games at 3Arena.

The club is placed 12th in the all-time Allsvenskan table, the Swedish first league, and has won the domestic championship title once, in 2001. (Note: The title of "Swedish Champions" has been awarded to the winner of four different competitions over the years. Between 1896 and 1925 the title was awarded to the winner of Svenska Mästerskapet, a stand-alone cup tournament. No club were given the title between 1926 and 1930 even though the first-tier league Allsvenskan was played. In 1931 the title was reinstated and awarded to the winner of Allsvenskan. Between 1982 and 1990 a play-off in cup format was held at the end of the league season to decide the champions. After the play-off format in 1991 and 1992 the title was decided by the winner of Mästerskapsserien, an additional league after the end of Allsvenskan. Since the 1993 season the title has once again been awarded to the winner of Allsvenskan.)

== Key ==
General

- League appearances and goals are for first-team competitive league matches only, including Allsvenskan, Svenska Serien, Superettan, Division 1, Division 2, Division 3 and Division 4 matches. Qualification and play-off matches are included, as well as substitute appearances.
- Players are listed according to the total number of league games played, the player with the most goals scored is ranked higher if two or more players are tied.

Table headers

- Nationality – If a player played international football, the country/countries he played for are shown. Otherwise, the player's nationality is given as their country of birth.
- Hammarby Fotboll career – The year of the player's first appearance for Hammarby Fotboll to the year of his last appearance.
- League appearances – The number of games played in league competition.
- League goals – The number of goals scored in league competition.

Symbols key
Colour	Meaning
	Hammarby Fotboll player in the 2025 season
	Club-trained player (Note: A player who between the ages of 15 and 21 has been registered with Hammarby for a period of three entire seasons (or 36 months), according to definitions of UEFA.)
	Player holds club record(s)

== Players ==
=== Appearances ===
Statistics correct as of match played 9 February 2021.

==== 75+ appearances ====
Player	Position	Hammarby IF career	League appearances	League goals	Notes
(Sweden) Bertil Bäckvall	MF	1940–1946	99	48	
(Sweden) Sven Käll	MF	1924–1931	99	12	
(Brazil) Paulinho Guará	FW	2005–2008; 2011	99	12	
(Sweden) Patrik Andersson	FW	1996–2000	98	25	
(Sweden) Sören Mannberg	DF	1967–1971	97	13	
(Norway) Petter Furuseth	MF	2004–2006; 2010–2011	96	9	
(Sweden) Gustav Lindberg	MF	1933–1939	96	2	
(Sweden) Erkan Zengin	MF	2004–2008; 2018	95	8	
(Sweden) Jan Holmberg	DF	1956–1962; 1966–1967	95	1	
(Sweden) Gerhard Hill	MF	1949–1956	94	21	
(Sweden) Georg Kraemer	MF	1951–1958	94	11	
(Sweden) Patrik Gerrbrand	DF	2000–2005; 2009–2011	94	5	
(Sweden) Axel Nilsson	MF	1925–1932	93	46	
(Sweden) Sven Stenqvist	MF	1928–1937	93	11	
(Sweden) John Karlsson	MF	1935–1943	93	5	
(Sweden) Lars-Åke Persson	DF	1960–1967	92	1	
(Sweden) Richard Magyar	DF	2015–2017; 2019–2022	92	5	
(Sweden) Lars Nordin	FW	1961–1965	90	43	
(Sweden) Kurt Kjellström	FW	1941–1947	89	85	
(Sweden) Karl-Gustav Karlsson	MF	1942–1949	89	3	
(Sweden) Haris Laitinen	MF	2004–2009	88	3	
(Sweden) Lars-Ove Holmberg	FW	1968–1973; 1976	87	28	
(Sweden) Fritz Hedström	MF	1926–1932	87	8	
(Sweden) Hans Friberg	DF	1927–1932	86	0	
(Sweden) Åke Löfgren	DF	1936–1944	86	0	
(Sweden) Andreas Dahl	MF	2009–2012	85	12	
(Sweden) Oliver Dovin	GK	2009–2012	85	0	
(Sweden) Muamer Tanković	FW	2017–2020	84	29	
(Sweden) Kim Bergstrand	FW	1995–1998	84	28	
(Denmark) Christian Traoré	DF	2002; 2007–2010	84	3	
(Iceland) Birkir Már Sævarsson	DF	2015–2017	84	3	
(Sweden) Håkan Magnusson	DF	1964–1967	84	3	
(Sweden) Peter Claesson	MF	1968–1972	83	9	
(Sweden) Tore Apelgren	DF	1955–1959	83	1	
(Sweden) Johan Persson	MF	2014–2017	82	4	
(Sweden) Björn Runström	FW	2004–2006; 2011	81	21	
(Sweden) Erik Larsson	MF	1925–1933	79	8	
(Sweden) Simon Helg	MF	2007–2012	78	8	
(Sweden) Bernt Lif	FW	1962–1966	76	46	
(Sweden) Erik Israelsson	MF	2014–2017	76	20	
(Sweden) Jean-Paul Vonderburg	DF	1985–1988; 1995–1996	76	5	
(Sweden) Rune Björklund	FW	1953–1958	75	19	
(Norway) Fredrik Torsteinbø	MF	2014–2017	75	12	

==== 50+ appearances ====
Player	Position	Hammarby IF career	League appearances	League goals	Notes
(Sweden) Roger Fransson	FW	1972–1975	74	19	
(Sweden) Jusef Erabi	MF	2021–2025	73	19	
(Gabon) Serge-Junior Martinsson Ngouali	MF	2017–2020	73	3	
(Sweden) Henry Schmägers	MF	1923–1931	73	0	
(Montenegro) Vladimir Rodić	MF	2018–2021	73	10	
(Syria) Louay Chanko	MF	2006–2009	72	7	
(Sweden) Georg Skoglund	MF	1947–1952	72	9	
(Sweden) Gustaf Pettersson	FW	1920–1928	71	19	
(Sweden) Maic Sema	MF	2008–2011	71	13	
(Sweden) Tesfaldet Tekie	MF	2023–	71	7	
(Sweden) Markus Karlsson	DF	2022–	71	4	
(Sweden) Johan Hult	DF	1975–1977	70	6	
(Sweden) David Fällman	DF	2018–2021	70	1	
(Sweden) Reinhold Norberg	DF	1920–1927	70	0	
(Sweden) Pavle Vagić	DF	2022–	69	0	
(Sweden) Edvin Kurtulus	DF	2022–2024	66	3	
(Sweden) Linus Hallenius	FW	2009–2010; 2014–2015	64	23	
(Sweden) Peter Edlund	MF	1967–1974	64	1	
(Sweden) Andreas Hermansson	FW	2000–2002	63	28	
(Sweden) Jonnie Efraimsson	FW	1980–1984	63	13	
(Sweden) Roger Sandberg	DF	1999–2001	63	0	
(Norway) Lars Sætra	DF	2014–2016	62	3	
(Sweden) Peter Markstedt	FW	2001–2003	61	20	
(Iceland) Ögmundur Kristinsson	GK	2015–2017	61	0	
(Iceland) Arnór Smárason	MF	2016–2018	60	9	
(Sweden) Simon Strand	DF	2023–	59	2	
(Sweden) Emil Ströberg	FW	1922–1927; 1929–1930	58	31	
(Denmark) Bjørn Paulsen	MF	2017–2019	58	13	
(Norway) Trym Bergman	MF	2000–2002	58	4	
(Sweden) Erik Figueroa	DF	2011–2013	58	2	
(Sweden) Stefan Batan	DF	2014–2017	58	0	
(United States) Charlie Davies	FW	2007–2009	56	21	
(Sweden) Emil Johansson	DF	2007–2009	56	2	
(Sweden) Daniel Theorin	DF	2012–2014	56	1	
(Sweden) Roland Eriksson	FW	1947–1952	55	35	
(Sweden) Montader Madjed	MF	2022–	55	8	
(Serbia) Nikola Đurđić	FW	2018-2019	54	26	
(Iraq) Jiloan Hamad	MF	2017–2018	54	15	
(Sweden) Christophe Lallet	MF	2012–2013	54	12	
(Sweden) Andreas Bild	MF	1999–2001	54	3	
(Sweden) Carlos Gaete Moggia	MF	2008–2011	54	1	
(Sweden) Hampus Skoglund	DF	2024–	54	0	
(Sweden) Thomas Sjöberg	FW	1974–1977	53	9	
(Denmark) Thomas Guldborg Christensen	DF	2012–2015	53	1	
(Sweden) Marcus Törnstrand	DF	2008–2012	53	0	
(Sweden) Hans Sandberg	MF	1971–1974	52	6	
(Sweden) Emil Haag	MF	1939–1943	52	1	
(Sweden) Hans Berggren	FW	1998–1999	51	19	
(Sweden) Fredrik Stoor	DF	2002–2006	51	2	
(Sweden) Stig Karlsson	FW	1936–1941	50	38	
(Sweden) Bo Mattsson	DF	1976–1978	50	0	
