= 2021 Superettan =

Superettan
- Season: 2021
- Champions: IFK Värnamo
- Promoted: IFK Värnamo; GIF Sundsvall; Helsingborgs IF
- Relegated: Akropolis IF; GAIS; Vasalunds IF; Falkenbergs FF
- Matches played: 240
- Goals scored: 612 (2.55 per match)
- Top goalscorer: Ajdin Zeljkovic (18 goals)
- Biggest home win: Jönköping 5–1 Vasalund (11 April 2021); Eskilstuna 4–0 Örgryte (25 July 2021); Helsingborg 4–0 Falkenberg (27 July 2021); Trelleborg 4–0 Eskilstuna (26 October 2021)
- Biggest away win: Västerås 0–4 Helsingborg (18 July 2021)
- Highest scoring: Vasalund 3–4 GAIS (29 August 2021); Falkenberg 3–4 Eskilstuna (7 November 2021)
- Longest winning run: 5 matches Landskrona BoIS; GIF Sundsvall
- Longest unbeaten run: 12 matches Östers IF
- Longest winless run: 11 matches Jönköpings Södra IF
- Longest losing run: 4 matches GAIS; Vasalunds IF
- Highest attendance: 7,881; GAIS 2–1 Örgryte IS (29 September 2021)

The 2021 Superettan was part of the 2021 Swedish football season, and the 22nd season of Superettan, Sweden's second-tier football division in its current format. A total of 16 teams contested the league.

== Teams ==
A total of 16 teams contested the league. The top two teams qualified directly for promotion to Allsvenskan, the third entered a play-off for the chance of promotion. The two bottom teams were automatically relegated, while the 13th and 14th placed teams competed in a play-off to determine whether they are relegated.

=== Stadiums and locations ===
Locations of the 2021 Superettan teams

Team	Location	Stadium	Stadium capacity (Note: According to each club information page at the Swedish Football Association website for Allsvenskan.)
AFC Eskilstuna	Eskilstuna	Tunavallen	7,800
Akropolis IF	Spånga, Stockholm	Grimsta IP	5,000
Falkenbergs FF	Falkenberg	Falcon Alkoholfri Arena	5,500
GAIS	Gothenburg	Gamla Ullevi	18,416
GIF Sundsvall	Sundsvall	Idrottsparken (Note: Known as NP3 Arena for sponsorship reasons.)	7,700
Helsingborgs IF	Helsingborg	Olympia	16,500
IK Brage	Borlänge	Domnarvsvallen	6,500
Jönköpings Södra IF	Jönköping	Stadsparksvallen	5,500
Landskrona BoIS	Landskrona	Landskrona IP	10,500
Norrby IF	Borås	Borås Arena	17,800
Trelleborgs FF	Trelleborg	Vångavallen	7,000
Vasalunds IF	Solna, Stockholm	Skytteholms IP	4,000
IFK Värnamo	Värnamo	Finnvedsvallen	5,000
Västerås SK	Västerås	Iver Arena	7,000
Örgryte IS	Gothenburg	Gamla Ullevi	18,416
Östers IF	Växjö	Visma Arena	12,000

== League table ==
Pos	Team	Pld	W	D	L	GF	GA	GD	Pts	Promotion, qualification or relegation
1	IFK Värnamo (C, P)	30	18	5	7	44	29	+15	59	Promotion to Allsvenskan
2	GIF Sundsvall (P)	30	15	8	7	46	29	+17	53	Promotion to Allsvenskan
3	Helsingborgs IF (O, P)	30	13	9	8	47	29	+18	48	Qualification to promotion play-offs
4	Norrby IF	30	13	9	8	41	33	+8	48	
5	Östers IF	30	12	10	8	33	26	+7	46	
6	Landskrona BoIS	30	13	5	12	41	37	+4	44	
7	Trelleborgs FF	30	11	10	9	42	39	+3	43	
8	Örgryte IS	30	9	14	7	39	39	0	41	
9	AFC Eskilstuna	30	11	7	12	41	41	0	40	
10	IK Brage	30	10	9	11	40	42	−2	39	
11	Jönköpings Södra IF	30	10	8	12	34	37	−3	38	
12	Västerås SK	30	8	12	10	36	40	−4	36	
13	Akropolis IF (R)	30	9	8	13	28	44	−16	35	Qualification to relegation play-offs
14	GAIS (R)	30	10	4	16	31	40	−9	34	Qualification to relegation play-offs
15	Vasalunds IF (R)	30	7	5	18	35	52	−17	26	Relegation to Ettan
16	Falkenbergs FF (R)	30	6	7	17	34	55	−21	25	Relegation to Ettan

Source: svenskfotboll.se (in Swedish)
Rules for classification: 1) Points; 2) Goal difference; 3) Number of goals scored; 4) Head-to-head points; 5) Head-to-head goal difference; 6) Head-to-head away goals scored
(C) Champions; (O) Play-off winners; (P) Promoted; (R) Relegated

=== Relegation play-offs ===
The 13th-placed and 14th-placed teams of Superettan met the two runners-up from 2021 Division 1 (Norra and Södra) in two-legged ties on a home-and-away basis with the teams from Superettan finishing at home.

2 December 2021
19:00

Skövde AIK	3–0	Akropolis IF
Granath 45+2'; Ask 47'; Lindell 59'	Report

Södermalms IP, Skövde
Attendance: 1,527
Referee: Joakim Östling
5 December 2021
14:00

Akropolis IF	0–0	Skövde AIK
	Report

Grimsta IP, Spånga
Referee: Granit Maqedonci

Skövde AIK won 3–0 on aggregate and are promoted.

2 December 2021
19:00

Dalkurd FF	2–1	GAIS
Rahmani 64'; 90' (o.g.)	Report	Lindberg 80'

Nya Studenternas IP, Uppsala
Attendance: 1,597
Referee: Adi Aganovic
5 December 2021
16:00

GAIS	1–1	Dalkurd FF
Kargbo 79'	Report	Aras 32'

Gamla Ullevi, Gothenburg
Attendance: 3,080
Referee: Fredrik Klitte

Dalkurd FF won 3–2 on aggregate and are promoted.

=== Positions by round ===
Team ╲ Round	1	2	3	4	5	6	7	8	9	10	11	12	13	14	15	16	17	18	19	20	21	22	23	24	25	26	27	28	29	30
IFK Värnamo	15	10	3	2	1	1	1	1	1	3	6	3	3	1	2	4	1	1	1	1	1	1	1	1	1	1	1	1	1	1
GIF Sundsvall	7	11	9	9	5	4	3	3	5	2	2	5	7	7	6	6	6	6	6	6	4	3	2	2	2	2	2	2	2	2
Helsingborgs IF	6	2	4	3	3	8	5	7	9	9	7	7	5	5	4	2	2	2	2	2	2	2	3	3	3	3	3	3	3	3
Norrby IF	12	8	11	11	8	2	2	2	2	4	3	2	2	3	1	3	4	5	3	5	5	6	6	4	5	6	4	4	4	4
Östers IF	5	6	1	4	9	7	9	12	11	11	8	9	9	9	9	9	9	9	11	10	9	9	9	8	7	7	7	5	6	5
Landskrona BoIS	2	4	6	5	4	3	4	4	3	1	1	1	1	2	3	1	3	4	5	4	6	4	4	5	4	5	6	7	5	6
Trelleborgs FF	3	5	7	6	7	5	7	10	6	5	4	6	4	4	5	5	5	3	4	3	3	5	5	6	6	4	5	6	7	7
Örgryte IS	14	16	15	15	16	13	15	15	15	16	12	10	11	10	12	10	11	11	9	9	10	10	10	10	10	8	8	8	8	8
AFC Eskilstuna	10	3	5	8	12	10	11	9	10	10	11	8	8	8	8	8	8	8	7	8	8	8	8	9	9	11	12	10	9	9
IK Brage	9	12	14	16	15	16	14	14	13	15	16	13	13	14	14	11	12	13	10	11	13	14	12	13	11	13	13	13	10	10
Jönköpings Södra IF	1	7	8	7	11	12	10	8	4	6	5	4	6	6	7	7	7	7	8	7	7	7	7	7	8	9	9	9	12	11
Västerås SK	11	13	10	10	6	9	6	6	7	7	9	11	12	11	11	13	13	14	14	14	12	13	14	14	12	10	11	11	11	12
Akropolis IF	8	14	13	13	13	14	16	13	16	13	14	16	14	13	13	14	10	12	12	12	15	12	13	11	13	12	10	12	13	13
GAIS	4	1	2	1	2	6	8	5	8	8	10	12	10	12	10	12	14	10	13	13	11	11	11	12	14	14	14	14	14	14
Vasalunds IF	16	15	16	12	14	15	12	11	12	12	13	14	15	15	15	15	15	16	16	16	14	15	16	16	16	16	16	15	15	15
Falkenbergs FF	13	9	12	14	10	11	13	16	14	14	15	15	16	16	16	16	16	15	15	15	16	16	15	15	15	15	15	16	16	16

Promotion to Allsvenskan
Promotion play-offs
Relegation play-offs
Relegation to Division 1

Source: everysport.com

== Results by round ==
Team ╲ Round	1	2	3	4	5	6	7	8	9	10	11	12	13	14	15	16	17	18	19	20	21	22	23	24	25	26	27	28	29	30
Akropolis IF	D	L	D	D	D	L	L	W	L	W	L	L	D	W	W	L	W	L	D	L	L	W	D	W	L	W	W	L	D	L
IK Brage	D	L	L	L	D	L	W	D	W	L	L	W	L	D	W	D	D	L	W	L	L	D	W	D	W	D	L	W	W	W
AFC Eskilstuna	D	W	D	L	L	W	L	W	L	D	L	W	W	L	D	W	L	W	D	L	D	D	L	L	W	L	L	W	W	W
Falkenbergs FF	L	W	L	L	W	L	L	L	W	D	L	L	L	D	D	L	W	W	D	L	L	D	W	D	L	L	D	L	L	L
GAIS	W	W	D	W	L	L	L	W	L	L	L	L	D	L	W	L	L	W	L	W	D	W	L	L	L	W	L	L	D	W
GIF Sundsvall	D	L	W	D	W	W	W	L	L	W	W	L	L	D	D	W	W	L	W	W	W	W	W	D	W	D	D	W	D	L
Helsingborgs IF	D	W	D	W	D	L	L	W	W	W	L	W	L	W	W	W	D	W	D	D	W	L	D	L	W	L	W	L	D	D
Jönköpings Södra IF	W	L	D	D	L	L	W	W	W	D	W	W	L	L	L	W	W	W	L	L	D	D	L	D	L	L	D	D	L	W
Landskrona BoIS	W	D	D	D	W	W	L	D	W	W	W	W	W	L	L	W	L	L	L	W	L	W	L	D	W	L	L	L	W	L
Norrby IF	L	W	L	D	W	W	W	W	L	D	W	W	W	D	W	L	L	D	D	D	D	L	D	W	L	D	W	L	W	W
Trelleborgs FF	W	D	D	D	D	W	L	L	W	W	W	L	W	W	D	W	L	W	W	D	D	L	L	D	D	W	L	L	D	L
Vasalunds IF	L	D	L	W	L	L	W	W	L	L	L	L	W	L	L	W	D	L	D	L	W	L	L	D	L	L	D	W	L	L
IFK Värnamo	L	W	W	W	W	D	W	D	L	L	W	W	W	W	D	L	W	W	L	W	D	W	W	D	W	W	W	W	L	L
Västerås SK	D	L	W	D	W	D	W	D	L	D	L	L	L	W	L	L	D	L	D	D	W	L	L	W	W	W	D	D	D	D
Örgryte IS	L	L	D	D	L	W	L	D	D	D	W	W	L	W	L	D	D	D	W	W	D	D	L	D	D	W	D	W	D	W
Östers IF	W	D	W	L	L	W	L	L	D	D	W	L	W	L	D	L	D	L	D	W	W	W	D	D	W	D	W	W	D	W

Source: soccerstats.com
W = Win; D = Draw; L = Lose

== Results ==
Home \ Away	AKR	BRA	ESK	FAL	GAI	GIF	HIF	JÖN	LAN	NOR	TRE	VAS	VÄR	VÄS	ÖRG	ÖST
Akropolis		1–1	1–0	1–0	0–0	1–1	0–3	1–1	1–0	0–3	3–1	3–2	1–2	0–2	0–1	1–0
Brage	2–0		1–0	0–1	1–4	0–0	0–0	3–2	1–0	1–2	0–1	3–0	3–1	3–3	1–3	2–2
Eskilstuna	3–0	2–1		1–1	0–0	2–0	2–2	1–0	1–0	4–1	3–2	1–2	0–2	0–1	4–0	1–1
Falkenbergs FF	3–3	1–2	3–4		0–1	1–1	1–4	2–3	2–1	1–1	1–0	0–3	0–3	2–1	3–2	0–2
GAIS	1–1	0–2	2–3	0–0		2–1	0–1	0–1	1–3	1–4	2–3	2–0	1–2	1–0	2–1	3–2
GIF Sundsvall	3–0	3–3	3–1	1–1	2–0		2–2	1–2	1–0	2–0	2–0	3–2	2–0	1–0	0–1	1–1
Helsingborgs IF	1–0	3–0	1–0	4–0	0–1	1–2		3–0	2–1	0–2	1–1	0–0	2–3	2–2	4–1	0–1
Jönköpings Södra	4–1	0–0	1–2	2–1	1–0	1–1	0–0		3–1	0–1	0–1	5–1	0–3	0–0	0–2	2–1
Landskrona BoIS	1–1	2–1	1–0	2–1	2–1	2–0	0–1	2–0		1–0	4–2	3–1	2–0	1–0	1–1	1–4
Norrby	0–1	2–3	2–1	1–0	0–2	1–4	2–2	2–0	1–1		1–1	0–0	2–0	4–1	2–1	0–0
Trelleborg	1–1	3–1	4–0	2–1	1–0	1–0	2–0	1–3	2–2	2–1		1–2	2–3	0–1	1–1	1–0
Vasalunds IF	0–1	1–0	4–2	3–1	3–4	1–2	0–1	1–1	0–3	0–1	2–2		1–1	0–1	1–2	1–0
IFK Värnamo	1–0	1–0	1–1	3–2	1–0	2–1	3–1	2–0	2–0	1–2	0–1	1–0		3–2	1–1	2–0
Västerås	2–3	2–2	0–0	1–3	3–0	1–2	0–4	2–1	3–1	1–1	1–1	2–1	0–0		2–2	0–0
Örgryte	3–1	1–1	2–2	1–1	1–0	0–2	1–1	0–0	3–2	2–2	2–2	3–1	0–0	1–1		0–1
Öster	2–1	1–2	2–0	2–1	1–0	0–2	2–1	1–0	1–1	0–0	0–0	3–2	2–0	1–1	0–0	

Source: svenskfotboll.se (in Swedish)
Legend: Blue = home team win; Yellow = draw; Red = away team win.

== Season statistics ==
=== Top scorers ===
As of 27 November 2021

Rank	Player	Club	Goals
1	(Sweden) Ajdin Zeljkovic	Örgryte IS	18
2	(Curaçao) Anthony van den Hurk	Helsingborgs IF	17
3	(Sweden) Linus Hallenius	GIF Sundsvall	15
3	(Sweden) Dijan Vukojević	Norrby IF	15
5	(England) Ashley Coffey	AFC Eskilstuna	13
5	(Kosovo) Leonard Pllana	IK Brage	13
7	(Sweden) Erik Björndahl	Västerås SK	10
8	(Sweden) Alexander Ahl Holmström	AFC Eskilstuna	9
8	(Sweden) Pontus Engblom	GIF Sundsvall	9
8	(Denmark) Nicolas Mortensen	Östers IF	9

=== Top assists ===
As of 27 November 2021

Rank	Player	Club	Assists
1	(Sweden) Wilhelm Loeper	Helsingborgs IF	12
2	(Sweden) Pontus Engblom	GIF Sundsvall	9
3	(Sweden) Taha Ali	Västerås SK	8
3	(Sweden) Johan Blomberg	Trelleborgs FF	8
3	(Faroe Islands) Brandur Hendriksson	Helsingborgs IF	8
3	(Sweden) Oscar Johansson	IFK Värnamo	8

=== Hat-tricks ===
Player	For	Against	Result	Date
(Sweden) Alexander Ahl Holmström	AFC Eskilstuna	Trelleborgs FF	3–2	29 May 2021
(Curaçao) Anthony van den Hurk	Helsingborgs IF	Västerås SK	0–4	18 July 2021
(Sweden) Dijan Vukojević	Norrby IF	Västerås SK	4–1	26 July 2021
(Curaçao) Anthony van den Hurk	Helsingborgs IF	Falkenbergs FF	4–0	27 July 2021
(Sweden) Adam Egnell	GAIS	IK Brage	1–4	18 September 2021
(Sweden) Simon Johansson	Västerås SK	GAIS	3–0	5 October 2021
(Curaçao) Anthony van den Hurk	Helsingborgs IF	Falkenbergs FF	1–4	19 October 2021
(England) Ashley Coffey	AFC Eskilstuna	Falkenbergs FF	3–4	7 November 2021

=== Discipline ===
==== Player ====
- Most yellow cards: 10
  - (Sweden) Filip Tronêt (Västerås SK)
- Most red cards: 3
  - (Sweden) Filip Almström Tähti (Västerås SK)

==== Club ====
- Most yellow cards: 75
  - AFC Eskilstuna
- Most red cards: 4
  - AFC Eskilstuna
  - Landskrona BoIS
