= Ajdin Zeljković =

Swedish footballer

Ajdin Zeljkovic
Personal information
- Date of birth: 26 December 1997 (age 28)
- Place of birth: Gothenburg, Sweden
- Height: 1.81 m (5 ft 11 in)
- Positions: Forward; winger

Team information
- Current team: FC Aktobe
- Number: 10

Youth career
- Gunnilse IS

Senior career*
| Years | Team | Apps | (Gls) |
| 2013–2016 | Gunnilse IS | | |
| 2017–2018 | GAIS | 18 | (3) |
| 2018 | → Ljungskile SK (loan) | 5 | (3) |
| 2019 | IK Oddevold | 12 | (1) |
| 2019–2020 | Lindome GIF | 44 | (14) |
| 2021–2022 | Örgryte IS | 41 | (26) |
| 2022–2025 | IFK Värnamo | 100 | (23) |
| 2026– | FC Aktobe | 15 | (1) |
- * Club domestic league appearances and goals as of 2 July 2026

Ajdin Zeljkovic (born 26 December 1997) is a Swedish footballer who plays as a forward or winger for FC Aktobe in the Kazakh Premier League.

== Career ==
Zeljkovic began his career with local Gothenburg club Gunnilse IS. In 2016 he scored 15 goals in 26 games, and was picked up by GAIS. Here, he failed to break through and chose not to renew his contract. He expressed dissatisfaction with the purported wage, his playing time until then, as well as his role in the team.

Zeljkovic's goalscoring form started picking up in 2020 with Lindome GIF, scoring 12 goals. In 2021 he became top goalscorer of the Superettan with 18 goals for his new club Örgryte IS. Interest was reportedly shown by IFK Göteborg, AIK, Hammarby IF, IF Elfsborg and a Norwegian club FK Haugesund. Some of these placed transfer bids, but Örgryte desired upwards of 5 million kr.

A transfer did not happen during the 2021–22 winter window, but when Zeljkovic scored 8 goals in the first half of 2022, despite Örgryte performing badly, he was finally picked up by Allsvenskan club IFK Värnamo. Zeljkovic was Örgryte's largest sale "in over a decade".

Zeljkovic started the 2024 Allsvenskan in good scoring form, among others securing Värnamo's first victory with the lone goal in the match against Sirius.

In January 2026, following IFK Värnamo's relegation from Allsvenskan, Zeljkovic transferred abroad for the first time in his career, joining Kazakh Premier League club FC Aktobe on a free transfer.
