= Marc Llinares =

Spanish footballer

Personal information
- Full name: Marc Llinares Barragán
- Date of birth: 26 August 1999 (age 27)
- Place of birth: Barcelona, Spain
- Height: 1.79 m (5 ft 10 in)
- Position: Left-back

Team information
- Current team: Śląsk Wrocław
- Number: 8

Youth career
- Espanyol
- Villarreal
- 2016–2018: Damm

Senior career*
Years	Team	Apps	(Gls)
2018–2020	Mallorca B	16	(0)
2020–2021	Algeciras	27	(3)
2021–2023	Albacete	20	(0)
2022–2023	→ Osasuna B (loan)	29	(1)
2023–2025	Hammarby IF	21	(1)
2025–	Śląsk Wrocław	46	(2)
- * Club domestic league appearances and goals as of 13:11, 26 May 2026 (UTC)

Marc Llinares Barragán (born 26 August 1999) is a Spanish professional footballer who plays as a left-back for Ekstraklasa club Śląsk Wrocław.

== Early life ==
Llinares was born in Barcelona, Catalonia, and started to play youth football with local club RCD Espanyol, where he spent seven years. He later moved on to represent both Villarreal CF and CF Damm at youth level.

== Club career ==
=== Early career ===
On 28 June 2018, after finishing his formation, Llinares signed for RCD Mallorca and was initially assigned to the reserves in Tercera División; He made his senior debut on 18 August 2018, starting in a 1–0 home win over UD Poblense, and featured in 16 matches before suffering a knee injury in April 2019, being sidelined for eight months.

On 31 January 2020, Llinares signed for Segunda División B side Algeciras CF. He helped the club to reach the 2021 Segunda División B play-offs, being knocked out by Real Sociedad B, before leaving on 9 June 2021.

On 18 June 2021, Llinares signed a two-year contract with Albacete Balompié, recently relegated to Primera División RFEF. He featured mainly as a substitute during the season, as the club returned to Segunda División at first attempt.

On 25 August 2022, Llinares was sent on loan with a purchase option to CA Osasuna B also in the third division. Throughout the 2022–23 season, he made 29 league appearances for the side in the Primera Federación.

On 22 July 2023, Llinares left Alba by mutual consent, with one year left on his contract.

=== Hammarby ===
On 26 July 2023, Llinares signed a three-year contract with Hammarby IF in the Swedish Allsvenskan. He made his first competitive appearance for Spanish head coach Martí Cifuentes on 20 August the same year, coming on as a substitute in a 0–0 away draw against Kalmar FF. In total, he made 11 league appearances for the side in 2023, although Hammarby disappointedly finished 7th in the table.

=== Śląsk Wrocław ===
On 13 January 2025, Llinares signed an eighteen-month deal with Polish Ekstraklasa club Śląsk Wrocław.

== Career statistics ==
As of match played 24 May 2026

Appearances and goals by club, season and competition
Club	Season	League			National cup (Note: Includes Copa del Rey, Svenska Cupen)		Continental		Total	
Club	Season	Division	Apps	Goals	Apps	Goals	Apps	Goals	Apps	Goals
Mallorca B	2018–19	Tercera División	16	0	0	0	—		16	0
Algeciras CF	2019–20	Segunda División B	3	0	0	0	—		3	0
Algeciras CF	2020–21	Segunda División B	24	3	0	0	—		24	3
Algeciras CF	Total		27	3	0	0	0	0	27	3
Albacete	2021–22	Primera Federación	20	0	2	0	—		22	0
Osasuna B (loan)	2022–23	Primera Federación	29	1	0	0	—		29	1
Hammarby IF	2023	Allsvenskan	11	0	2	0	0	0	13	0
Hammarby IF	2024	Allsvenskan	10	1	1	0	—		11	1
Hammarby IF	Total		21	1	3	0	0	0	24	1
Śląsk Wrocław	2024–25	Ekstraklasa	16	0	—		—		16	0
Śląsk Wrocław	2025–26	I liga	30	2	0	0	—		30	2
Śląsk Wrocław	Total		46	2	0	0	—		46	2
Career total			159	7	5	0	0	0	164	7
