= Adrian Lahdo =

Swedish footballer (born 2007)

Personal information
- Full name: Adrian Adriano Lahdo
- Date of birth: 26 December 2007 (age 18)
- Place of birth: Stockholm, Sweden
- Height: 1.79 m (5 ft 10 in)
- Position: Midfielder

Team information
- Current team: Como
- Number: 15

Youth career
- Arameisk-Syrianska IF
- –2024: Hammarby IF

Senior career*
Years	Team	Apps	(Gls)
2024–2025	Hammarby TFF	13	(3)
2024–2026	Hammarby IF	14	(1)
2026–	Como	2	(0)

International career^{‡}
2024	Sweden U17	8	(0)
2024–2026	Sweden U19	18	(1)
- * Club domestic league appearances and goals as of 21 November 2026 ‡ National team caps and goals as of 28 March 2026

Adrian Adriano Lahdo (born 26 December 2007) is a Swedish professional footballer who plays as a midfielder for Serie A club Como.

== Early life ==
Lahdo was born in Stockholm to Jony and Ninwe, both of Assyrian and Lebanese descent. His father Jony was a footballer in the Lebanese Premier League before moving to Sweden. He has two brothers, Mayckel and Gabriel, who are also footballers, and a sister, Ceilia.

== Club career ==
=== Hammaraby IF ===
Lahdo is a product of the Hammarby IF youth academy. In July 2024, he signed a new contract until the summer of 2027. Lahdo made his competitive debut in Allsvenskan for the club on 21 October 2024, in a 2–0 home win against Djurgårdens IF.

=== Como ===
On 3 February 2026, Serie A club Como announced the signing of Lahdo on a permanent basis until 2031. He made his debut on 24 October 2026, as an 88th-minute substitute in a 2–0 win over Sassuolo.

== International career ==
In March 2024, Lahdo was called up to the Swedish under-17s for the first time, ahead of two UEFA under-17 Championship qualification games against Bulgaria and Wales. He played in both games. In May 2024 he played in all three Sweden games in UEFA European Under-17 Championship in Cyprus. In October 2024 he made his debut for the Swedish under-18s.

== Career statistics ==
As of match played 21 November 2026

Appearances and goals by club, season and competition
Club	Season	League			National cup (Note: Includes Svenska Cupen)		Europe		Total	
Club	Season	Division	Apps	Goals	Apps	Goals	Apps	Goals	Apps	Goals
Hammaraby TFF	2024	Ettan Norra	9	3	—		—		9	3
Hammaraby TFF	2025	Ettan Norra	4	0	—		—		4	0
Hammaraby TFF	Total		13	3	0	0	0	0	13	3
Hammaraby IF	2024	Allsvenskan	2	0	3	0	—		5	0
Hammaraby IF	2025	Allsvenskan	12	1	1	2	2 (Note: Appearances in UEFA Conference League)	0	15	3
Hammaraby IF	Total		14	1	4	2	2	0	20	3
Como	2025–26	Serie A	0	0	0	0	—		0	0
Como	2026–27	Serie A	2	0	0	0	0	0	2	0
Como	Total		2	0	0	0	0	0	2	0
Career total			29	4	4	2	2	0	35	6
