= Simon Strand =

Swedish footballer (born 1993)

Personal information
- Full name: Simon August Love Strand
- Date of birth: 25 May 1993 (age 33)
- Place of birth: Huddinge, Sweden
- Height: 1.75 m (5 ft 9 in)
- Position: Full back

Team information
- Current team: IF Brommapojkarna
- Number: 16

Youth career
- Stuvsta
- –2012: Djurgården

Senior career*
Years	Team	Apps	(Gls)
2012	FC Väsby United	25	(4)
2013	IK Frej	25	(0)
2014–2015	Huddinge IF	47	(1)
2016–2017	Assyriska FF	40	(1)
2017	Östers IF	14	(0)
2018	Lyngby	0	(0)
2018	Dalkurd FF	29	(1)
2019–2022	IF Elfsborg	98	(1)
2023–2025	Hammarby	61	(2)
2026–	IF Brommapojkarna	9	(2)

International career
2008	Sweden U17	2	(0)
- * Club domestic league appearances and goals as of 8 July 2026

Simon August Love Strand (born 25 May 1993) is a Swedish professional footballer who plays as a full back for Allsvenskan club IF Brommapojkarna.

== Early life ==
Strand was born and raised in Huddinge, part of the Stockholm urban area, and started to play football with local club Stuvsta IF. He later joined the youth academy of Djurgården. In 2010, Strand reached the final of P19 Allsvenskan with the club, but lost 0–1 to Malmö FF.

== Club career ==
=== Years in Division 1 ===
In 2012, Strand joined Väsby United in Division 1, Sweden's third tier. He made 25 league appearances for the side, scoring four goals, in his first season at senior level. At the end of the year, Strand was picked for the all-star game "Morgondagens Stjärnor" (English: "The Stars Of Tomorrow"), where two teams play against each other consisting of the best young players from the league.

In 2013, Strand signed a one-year contract with IK Frej in the same league, making 25 appearances. In 2014, he moved to Huddinge, a local rival of his youth club Stuvsta IF, playing 47 games across two seasons in Division 1.

=== Assyriska ===
On 8 February 2016, Strand signed a three-year contract with Assyriska FF in the Superettan, Sweden's second tier. He established himself as a starter and made 28 league appearances, but was unable to help his club avoid relegation after a 2–4 defeat on aggregate to Norrby IF in the playoffs. In early 2017, he reportedly attracted interest from several Superettan clubs, most notably IF Brommapojkarna, but eventually remained with Assyriska. He made 12 appearances for the club in Division 1 throughout the first half of the season, before leaving in July.

=== Öster and Lyngby ===
On 10 July 2017, Strand transferred to Öster in Superettan, signing a two-and-a-half-year contract. He went on to make 14 appearances for the club, that finished 5th in the table despite being recently promoted, during the second half of the season.

On 4 January 2018, Strand transferred to Lyngby in the Danish Superliga, on a three-year deal. However, he left the club only about a month later, on 7 February, without making any competitive appearances. His contract was terminated by mutual consent, due to Lyngby's financial difficulties that resulted in player salaries being paid late.

=== Dalkurd ===
On 8 February 2018, Strand joined newly promoted Allsvenskan side Dalkurd on a free transfer, signing a three-year contract. He made 29 appearances for the club throughout the season, his first in Sweden's top tier, scoring once, although the side finished 15th in the table and suffered a relegation.

=== Elfsborg ===
On 25 February 2019, Strand transferred to Elfsborg in Allsvenskan, signing a three-year contract. He soon broke into the side as a starter, making 25 appearances in his debut season, and was voted Elfsborg Player of the Year by the supporters of the club.

In 2020, Strand made 24 appearances as Elfsborg finished 2nd in Allsvenskan, nine points behind Malmö. On 13 January 2021, he signed a new three-year contract with the club. The club finished 4th in the 2021 table, as Strand marked his 100th Allsvenskan appearance in a 3–0 away win against Djurgården on 18 October the same year.

After the 2022 season, in which he saw increased competition for playing time from both Oliver Zandén and Niklas Hult, Strand left Elfsborg. In total, he made 98 league appearances for the club across four seasons, scoring one goal.

=== Hammarby ===
On 7 March 2023, Strand transferred to Hammarby in Allsvenskan, signing a three-year contract.

== International career ==
Strand was called up to the Sweden national team for the training tour in Portugal in early 2022, that later was cancelled due to the COVID-19 pandemic.

== Career statistics ==
As of 24 October 2025

Appearances and goals by club, season and competition
Club	Season	League			Cup		Other		Total	
Club	Season	Division	Apps	Goals	Apps	Goals	Apps	Goals	Apps	Goals
Väsby United	2012	Division 1	25	4	1	0	—		26	4
IK Frej	2013	Division 1	25	0	4	0	—		29	0
Huddinge IF	2014	Division 1	22	0	2	0	—		24	0
Huddinge IF	2015	Division 1	25	1	4	0	—		29	1
Huddinge IF	Total		47	1	6	0	0	0	53	1
Assyriska FF	2016	Superettan	28	1	4	0	2 (Note: Appearances in the Superettan relegation play-offs.)	0	34	1
Assyriska FF	2017	Division 1	12	0	0	0	—		12	0
Assyriska FF	Total		40	1	4	0	2	0	46	1
Östers IF	2017	Superettan	14	0	1	0	—		15	0
Lyngby BK	2017–18	Danish Superliga	0	0	0	0	—		0	0
Dalkurd FF	2018	Allsvenskan	29	1	3	0	—		32	1
Dalkurd FF	2019	Superettan	0	0	3	0	—		3	0
Dalkurd FF	Total		29	1	6	0	0	0	35	1
IF Elfsborg	2019	Allsvenskan	25	1	2	0	—		27	1
IF Elfsborg	2020	Allsvenskan	24	0	4	0	—		28	0
IF Elfsborg	2021	Allsvenskan	26	0	4	1	6 (Note: Appearances in the UEFA Europa Conference League.)	0	36	1
IF Elfsborg	2022	Allsvenskan	23	0	2	0	2	0	27	0
IF Elfsborg	Total		98	1	12	1	8	0	118	2
Hammarby IF	2023	Allsvenskan	26	0	3	0	2	0	31	0
Hammarby IF	2024	Allsvenskan	14	0	3	0	—		17	0
Hammarby IF	2025	Allsvenskan	18	2	4	0	2	0	24	2
Hammarby IF	Total		58	2	10	0	4	0	72	2
Career total			336	10	44	1	14	0	394	11
