= Nahir Besara =

Swedish footballer (born 1991)

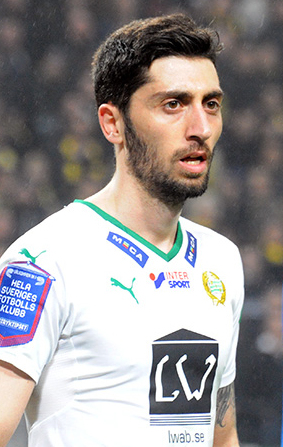
- Besara with Hammarby in 2015

Personal information
- Full name: Nahir Besara
- Date of birth: 25 February 1991 (age 35)
- Place of birth: Södertälje, Sweden
- Height: 1.82 m (5 ft 11 1/2 in)
- Position: Central midfielder

Team information
- Current team: Hammarby IF
- Number: 20

Youth career
- Assyriska FF

Senior career*
Years	Team	Apps	(Gls)
2008–2012	Assyriska FF	120	(17)
2013–2015	Hammarby IF	69	(16)
2015–2016	Göztepe	15	(1)
2016–2018	Örebro SK	73	(19)
2019	Al-Fayha	11	(3)
2019–2020	Pafos	22	(1)
2020	Örebro SK	29	(12)
2021	Hatta	13	(1)
2021–2022	Örebro SK	17	(4)
2022–	Hammarby IF	142	(52)

International career^{‡}
2007–2008	Sweden U17	11	(1)
2009–2010	Sweden U19	9	(1)
2024	Sweden	1	(0)
- * Club domestic league appearances and goals as of 7 November 2026 ‡ National team caps and goals as of 23:33, 12 January 2024 (UTC)

Nahir Besara (Syriac: ܢܗܝܪ ܒܪܣܐܪܐ; born 25 February 1991) is a Swedish professional footballer who captains Allsvenskan club Hammarby IF. He is usually deployed as a central midfielder.

== Club career ==
=== Assyriska FF ===
Besara started his career with local club Assyriska FF, where he made his senior debut in 2008, aged 17. He went on to play another four seasons with the side in Superettan, the Swedish second tier, as a regular. During this period, he also won several caps for the Sweden national U17's and 19's.

=== Hammarby IF ===
On 27 January 2013, Besara transferred to fellow Superettan club Hammarby IF, signing a three-year deal with the club. He had a difficult first season at his new side, since head coach Gregg Berhalter regularly opted to play him out of position as a forward. Besara ended the season making 28 league appearances, scoring four goals, when his side finished 5th in the Superettan table.

In 2014, Besara flourished under the new head coach Nanne Bergstrand, making 26 league appearances and scoring seven goals. He made his mark towards the end of the season and scored a hattrick in a 4–2 win against Östersunds FK on home turf on 28 October, which consolidated Hammarby's top position in the league. A few weeks later, the club won a promotion to Allsvenskan through claiming the Superettan title.

In 2015, Besara continued as a starter for Hammarby in Allsvenskan. On 13 April, in a derby against Djurgårdens IF, he scored the decisive goal in a 2–1 win through a spectacular back heel. Pundit Jens Fjellström compared the move with those of the Swedish international Zlatan Ibrahimović. He left the club in July the same year, halfway through the Allsvenskan season, being the club's leading scorer with five goals in 15 games.

=== Göztepe ===
On 15 July 2015, Besara transferred to Göztepe, recently promoted to the Turkish second tier TFF First League. He made 15 competitive appearances throughout the campaign, scoring once, before terminating his contract by mutual consent in the summer of 2016.

=== Örebro SK ===
On 11 August 2016, Besara signed a two-and-a-half-year deal with Örebro SK in Allsvenskan. The following month, he faced his former side Hammarby and scored the equalising goal in stoppage time, settling the score at 1–1. Besara chose not to celebrate the goal out of compassion for the supporters' of his old club. During the second half of the campaign, Besara played 13 games, scoring four goals, and helped Örebro to finish in 9th place in the Allsvenskan table.

In 2017, Besara established himself as one of the most affluent offensive players in Allsvenskan, as Örebro finished in 11th place. In 30 games, he scored 10 goals and provided seven assists, thus gathering the third most points of all players in the league. In July, he was nominated as player of the month in Allsvenskan, an award that eventually went to Simon Lundevall from IF Elfsborg.

In 2018, Besara had a flying start to the season and was nominated as Allsvenskan player of the month in April, but missed out the award to Jiloan Hamad from Hammarby. He ended the season scoring five goals and providing eight assists in 30 games, as Örebro finished in 9th place in the table. On 13 November the same year, it was announced that Besara would leave the club at the expiration of his contract.

=== Al-Fayha ===
On 25 January 2019, Besara signed a six-month deal with Al-Fayha in the Saudi Professional League, with an option to extend the contact for another season. Besara scored three goals in 11 league appearances, helping the club to finish in 12th place in the 2018–19 table, just above the relegation zone.

=== Pafos ===
On 20 August 2019, Besara joined Pafos FC in the Cypriot First Division.

=== Return to Örebro ===
On 3 June 2020, Besara returned to Örebro on a free transfer, signing a deal for the remainder of the year. Throughout the campaign, Besara scored 12 goals and provided four assists in 29 games, helping the club to reach a 7th place in the Allsvenskan table, their best result since 2014. In October, he was nominated to the award Allsvenskan player on the month, that eventually went to Ola Toivonen from Malmö FF.

=== Hatta ===
On 29 January 2021, Besara completed a move to Hatta in the UAE Pro League.

=== Third stint with Örebro ===
On 13 July 2021, Besara returned to Örebro in Allsvenskan for a third stint, signing a three-and-a-half-year contract. The club was placed in the lower regions of the table at the time of his arrival, and Besara would prove unable to help the club from suffering a relegation to Superettan, despite scoring four goals in 17 games.

On 20 January 2022, it was announced that Besara would leave Örebro by mutual consent.

=== Return to Hammarby ===
On 3 February 2022, Besara signed a two-year deal with his old club Hammarby IF, returning to the Allsvenskan side after seven years. Besara featured in the final of the 2021–22 Svenska Cupen, in which Hammarby lost by 4–5 on penalties to Malmö FF after the game ended in a 0–0 draw. In Allsvenskan, Besara played all 30 fixtures, scoring 11 goals and providing 11 assists, the most in the whole league. At the end of the season, he was nominated for Allsvenskan Midfielder of the Year, an award that eventually went to Mikkel Rygaard. Although, he was voted Hammarby Player of the Year by the supporters of the club.

On 2 April 2023, Besara was appointed as the new club captain of Hammarby, replacing Richard Magyar that had retired at the end of last season. The same day, he also signed a new three-year contract with the club, running until the end of 2025. In 2023, Hammarby disappointedly finished 7th in the Allsvenskan table, but Besara produced the most points in the whole league with 9 goals and 11 assists in 29 games.

== International career ==
Born in Sweden, Besara is of Assyrian descent. He was called up to the Sweden national team for the training tour in Cyprus in early 2024.

== Career statistics ==
As of 20 May 2026

Appearances and goals by club, season and competition
Club	Season	League			National Cup		Other		Total	
Club	Season	Division	Apps	Goals	Apps	Goals	Apps	Goals	Apps	Goals
Assyriska	2008	Superettan	9	0	–		0	0	9	0
Assyriska	2009	Superettan	27	3	1	1	0	0	28	4
Assyriska	2010	Superettan	27	2	1	0	0	0	28	2
Assyriska	2011	Superettan	28	4	–		0	0	28	4
Assyriska	2012	Superettan	29	8	1	0	0	0	30	8
Assyriska	Total		120	17	3	1	0	0	123	18
Hammarby	2013	Superettan	28	4	1	1	0	0	29	5
Hammarby	2014	Superettan	26	7	4	1	0	0	30	8
Hammarby	2015	Allsvenskan	15	5	4	0	0	0	19	5
Hammarby	Total		69	16	9	2	0	0	78	18
Göztepe	2015–16	TFF First League	15	1	0	0	0	0	15	1
Örebro	2016	Allsvenskan	13	4	1	0	0	0	14	4
Örebro	2017	Allsvenskan	30	10	3	1	0	0	33	11
Örebro	2018	Allsvenskan	30	5	5	4	0	0	35	9
Örebro	Total		73	19	9	5	0	0	82	24
Al-Fayha	2018–19	Saudi Pro League	11	3	0	0	0	0	11	3
Pafos	2019–20	Cypriot First Division	21	1	0	0	1 (Note: Appearance in Cypriot First Division Relegation Play-offs)	0	22	1
Örebro	2020	Allsvenskan	29	12	1	0	0	0	30	12
Hatta	2020–21	UAE Pro League	13	1	0	0	0	0	13	1
Örebro	2021	Allsvenskan	17	4	1	0	0	0	18	4
Hammarby	2022	Allsvenskan	30	11	6	2	—		36	13
Hammarby	2023	Allsvenskan	29	9	4	3	2 (Note: Appearances in UEFA Europa Conference League)	0	35	12
Hammarby	2024	Allsvenskan	28	10	3	2	—		31	12
Hammarby	2025	Allsvenskan	30	17	5	0	4	0	39	17
Hammarby	2026	Allsvenskan	8	5	6	6	—		14	11
Total			125	52	24	13	6	0	155	65
Career total			493	126	47	21	7	0	547	147

=== International ===
As of 16 October 2024

Appearances and goals by national team and year
National team	Year	Apps	Goals
Sweden	2024	1	0
Total		1	0

== Honours ==
Hammarby IF

- Superettan: 2014

Individual

- Hammarby IF Player of the Year: 2022
- Allsvenskan top assist provider: 2022
