= Victor Eriksson =

Swedish footballer

Personal information
- Full name: Victor Kim Ludwig Eriksson
- Date of birth: 17 September 2000 (age 26)
- Place of birth: Värnamo, Sweden
- Height: 1.92 m (6 ft 4 in)
- Position: Centre-back

Team information
- Current team: Hammarby IF
- Number: 4

Youth career
- Värnamo Södra

Senior career*
Years	Team	Apps	(Gls)
2015–2017	Värnamo Södra	35	(0)
2017–2023	Värnamo	125	(4)
2024	Minnesota United	4	(0)
2024	Minnesota United 2	6	(0)
2024–	Hammarby IF	67	(4)

International career
2023	Sweden	1	(0)
- * Club domestic league appearances and goals as of 2 November 2026

Victor Kim Ludwig Eriksson (born 17 September 2000) is a Swedish professional footballer who plays as a centre-back for Allsvenskan club Hammarby and the Sweden national team.

== Club career ==
Eriksson is a youth product of Värnamo Södra FF and began his senior career with them at the age of 15 in the Swedish fifth division. He moved to Värnamo in 2017, and in 2019 he began his professional career with them in the third division. He helped the team win the 2020 Ettan, earning promotion to the Superettan. The following season, he helped Värnamo win the 2021 Superettan, earning the club a historic promotion into the Allsvenskan for the first time. In their debut season in the Allsvenskan in 2022, Eriksson played in all of their matches.

On 25 January 2024, Eriksson signed a three-year deal with Major League Soccer side Minnesota United. He returned to Sweden just six-months later, signing with Allsvenskan side Hammarby on a four-and-a-half-year deal.

== International career ==
Eriksson made his international debut with the senior Sweden national team in a friendly 2–0 win to Finland on 9 January 2023.

== Career statistics ==
=== International ===
Appearances and goals by national team and year
National team	Year	Apps	Goals
Sweden	2023	1	0
Total		1	0

== Honours ==
Värnamo

- Ettan: 2020
- Superettan: 2021
