= Shaquille Pinas =

Dutch-Surinamese footballer (born 1998)

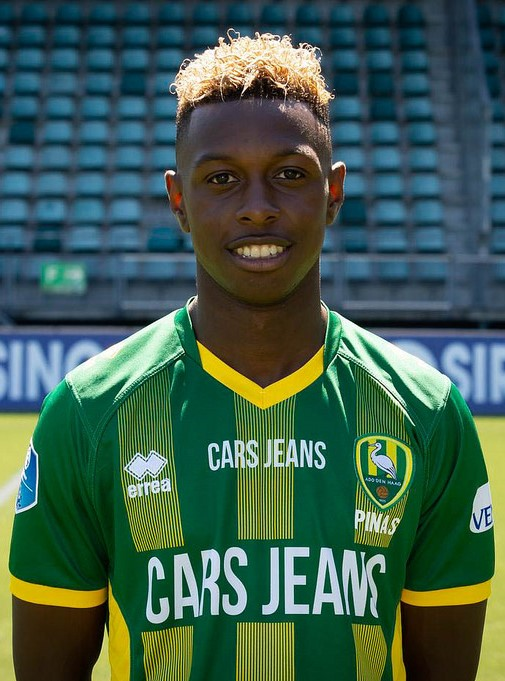
- Pinas with ADO Den Haag in 2018

Personal information
- Full name: Shaquille Riley Graciano Pinas
- Date of birth: 19 March 1998 (age 28)
- Place of birth: Rotterdam, Netherlands
- Height: 1.82 m (6 ft 0 in)
- Positions: Centre back; left-back

Team information
- Current team: Al-Kholood
- Number: 38

Youth career
- –2004: SC Feyenoord
- 2004–2007: Feyenoord
- 2007–2010: ADO Den Haag
- 2010–2011: Alphense Boys
- 2011–2017: Dordrecht

Senior career*
Years	Team	Apps	(Gls)
2016–2017	Dordrecht	4	(0)
2017–2021	ADO Den Haag	76	(6)
2021–2022	Ludogorets Razgrad	17	(0)
2021–2022	→ Ludogorets Razgrad II	2	(1)
2022–2025	Hammarby IF	84	(6)
2025–	Al-Kholood	40	(3)

International career^{‡}
2018–2019	Netherlands U20	6	(0)
2021–	Suriname	39	(4)
- * Club domestic league appearances and goals as of 15 October 2026 ‡ National team caps and goals as of 5 October 2026 (UTC)

Shaquille Riley Graciano Pinas (born 19 March 1998) is a professional footballer who plays as a centre back or left-back for Al-Kholood in the Saudi Pro League. Born in the Netherlands, he plays for the Suriname national team.

== Club career ==
=== ADO Den Haag ===
Pinas made his professional debut in the Eerste Divisie for FC Dordrecht on 20 January 2017 in a game against Jong FC Utrecht.

In the summer of 2017, Pinas moved to ADO Den Haag, initially being available in the club's under-23s. On 16 December 2017, he made his Eredivisie debut for the senior squad in a 0–3 away loss to PSV Eindhoven.

On 13 June 2018, Pinas signed a new three-year contract with ADO Den Haag.

At the end of the 2020–21 season, following the club's relegation from the Eredivisie, ADO Den Haag announced his departure. In total, Pinas made 81 competitive appearances across four seasons, scoring six goals.

=== Ludogorets Razgrad ===
On 29 June 2021, Pinas joined Ludogorets Razgrad in the Bulgarian First League, linking up with fellow Dutch player Sergio Padt. Throughout the 2021–22 season, Pinas made 17 league appearances for the club, which won its eleventh consecutive domestic title.

=== Hammarby IF ===
On 11 July 2022, Pinas signed a three-and-a-half-year contract with Hammarby IF in the Swedish Allsvenskan.

=== Al-Kholood ===
On 31 August 2025, Pinas joined Saudi Arabian club Al-Kholood.

== International career ==
Born in the Netherlands, Pinas is of Surinamese descent. He made his debut for Suriname national football team on 24 March 2021 in a World Cup qualifier against the Cayman Islands and scored the opening goal in a 3–0 victory. He participated with Suriname national football team in the Nations League 2026-2027 season and made obscene gestures against the host team. The referee sanctioned him with a red card and he ended up spitting and insulting the fans.

== Career statistics ==
=== Club ===
As of match played 14 March 2025

Appearances and goals by club, season and competition
Club	Season	League			National cup (Note: Includes KNVB Cup, Bulgarian Cup, Svenska Cupen)		Europe		Total	
Club	Season	Division	Apps	Goals	Apps	Goals	Apps	Goals	Apps	Goals
FC Dordrecht	2016–17	Eerste Divisie	4	0	0	0	–		4	0
ADO Den Haag	2017–18	Eredivisie	5	0	0	0	–		5	0
ADO Den Haag	2018–19	Eredivisie	19	0	2	0	–		21	0
ADO Den Haag	2019–20	Eredivisie	25	3	1	0	–		26	3
ADO Den Haag	2020–21	Eredivisie	27	3	2	0	–		29	3
ADO Den Haag	Total		76	6	5	0	–		81	6
Ludogorets Razgrad	2021–22	First League	17	0	2	0	5 (Note: Appearances in UEFA Europa League)	0	24	0
Ludogorets Razgrad II (loan)	2021–22	Second League	2	1	–		–		2	1
Ludogorets Razgrad II (loan)	Total		19	1	2	0	5	0	26	1
Hammarby IF	2022	Allsvenskan	14	0	5	1	–		19	1
Hammarby IF	2023	Allsvenskan	24	0	3	0	2 (Note: Appearances in UEFA Europa Conference League)	0	29	0
Hammarby IF	2024	Allsvenskan	28	4	3	0	–		31	4
Hammarby IF	Total		66	4	11	1	2	0	79	5
Career total			165	11	18	1	7	0	190	12

=== International ===
No.	Date	Venue	Opponent	Score	Result	Competition
1.	24 March 2021	Dr. Ir. Franklin Essed Stadion, Paramaribo, Suriname	Cayman Islands	1–0	3–0	2022 FIFA World Cup qualification
2.	4 June 2021	Dr. Ir. Franklin Essed Stadion, Paramaribo, Suriname	Bermuda	6–0	6–0	2022 FIFA World Cup qualification
3.	8 June 2024	Raymond E. Guishard Technical Centre, The Valley, Anguilla	Anguilla	2–0	4–0	2026 FIFA World Cup qualification
4.	15 June 2025	Snapdragon Stadium, San Diego, USA	Costa Rica	3–2	3–4	2025 CONCACAF Gold Cup

== Honours ==
Ludogorets Razgrad

- Bulgarian First League: 2021–22
