= Ibrahima Breze Fofana =

Guinean footballer (born 2002)

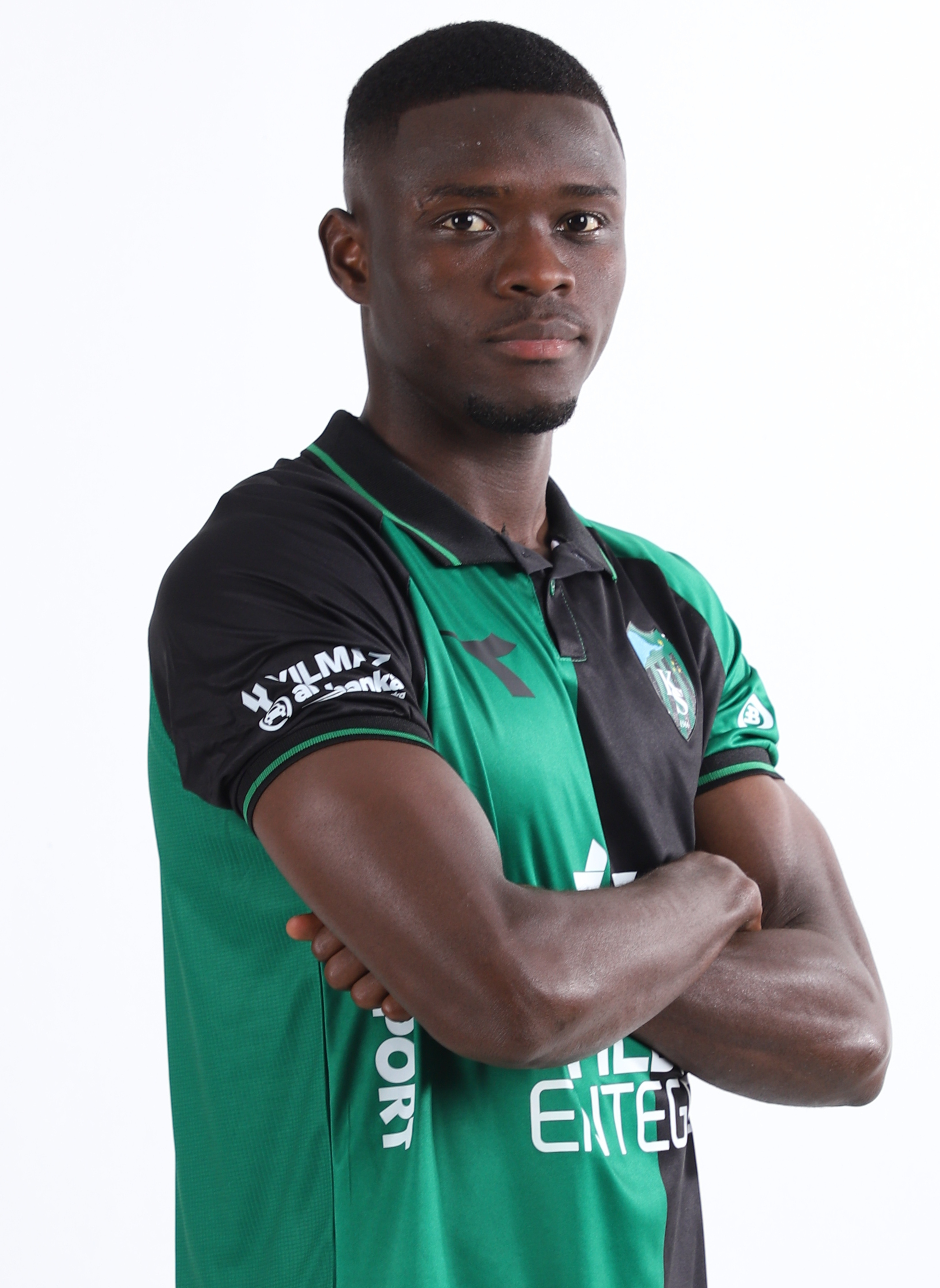
- Fofana with Kocaelispor in 2023

Personal information
- Date of birth: 15 August 2002 (age 24)
- Place of birth: Conakry, Guinea
- Height: 1.82 m (6 ft 0 in)
- Position: Central defender

Team information
- Current team: Hammarby IF
- Number: 6

Youth career
- –2019: FC Atouga
- 2019–2020: Diamants de Guinee
- 2020: Club Brugge

Senior career*
Years	Team	Apps	(Gls)
2021–2022	Club NXT	9	(0)
2022–2023	Hammarby TFF (res.)	26	(7)
2023–	Hammarby IF	56	(2)
2023–2024	→ Kocaelispor (loan)	14	(0)

International career^{‡}
2019	Guinea U17	5	(0)
2023–	Guinea U23	5	(1)
2025–	Guinea	3	(0)
- * Club domestic league appearances and goals as of 7 November 2026 ‡ National team caps and goals as of 25 June 2026

Ibrahima Breze Fofana (born 15 August 2002) is a Guinean professional footballer who plays as a central midfielder for Allsvenskan club Hammarby IF and the Guinea national team.

== Early life ==
Born and raised in Conakry, Guinea, Fofana played youth football with local clubs FC Atouga and Diamants de Guinee.

== Club career ==
=== Club Brugge ===
On 17 September 2020, following a successful trial, Fofana signed a three-year contract with Club Brugge in the Belgian First Division A. In 2020–21, Fofana made nine appearances for the club's reserve team Club NXT, competing in the second tier First Division B. He was regularly called up to train and play friendlies with the first-team squad, but failed to make any competitive appearances for Club Brugge. In late February 2021, Fofana sat on the bench in both legs against Dynamo Kyiv in the Europa League's round of 16, but remained an unused substitute.

=== Hammarby IF ===
On 22 July 2022, Fofana joined Hammarby TFF, the feeder team of Allsvenskan club Hammarby IF. He moved on a free transfer and signed a six month-deal, with an option for a further year. In 2022, he made 16 league appearances for Hammarby TFF, scoring four goals, helping the side to finish 6th in the Ettan table. On 30 January 2023, Fofana was promoted to Hammarby's senior squad, signing a four-year contract. On 17 July, before making any competitive appearances for Hammarby, Fofana was sent on a one-year loan to Kocaelispor in the TFF First League, with an option for a permanent transfer.

== International career ==
In June 2023, Fofana was included in the final squad of the Guinean under-23 national team for the 2023 U-23 Africa Cup of Nations, hosted in Morocco, where the Syli finished in fourth place.

== Career statistics ==
=== Club ===
As of match played 17 Octorber 2025

Club	Season	League			National Cup		Continental		Total	
Club	Season	Division	Apps	Goals	Apps	Goals	Apps	Goals	Apps	Goals
Club NXT	2020–21	Proximus League	9	0	–		–		9	0
Club NXT	Total		9	0	0	0	0	0	9	0
Hammarby TFF	2022	Ettan	16	4	–		–		16	4
Hammarby TFF	2023	Ettan	10	3	–		–		10	3
Hammarby TFF	Total		26	7	0	0	0	0	26	7
Hammarby IF	2024	Allsvenskan	13	0	3	1	—		16	1
Hammarby IF	2025	Allsvenskan	18	1	1	0	2 (Note: Appearances in UEFA Conference League)	0	21	1
Hammarby IF	Total		31	1	4	1	2	0	37	2
Career total			66	8	4	1	2	0	72	9
