= Wilson Lindberg =

Swedish association football player

Personal information
- Full name: Wilson Elliot Lindberg Uhrström
- Date of birth: 23 March 2006 (age 20)
- Place of birth: Sweden
- Position: Attacking midfielder

Team information
- Current team: BK Häcken
- Number: 18

Youth career
- 2013–2024: Hammarby IF

Senior career*
Years	Team	Apps	(Gls)
2025–2026	Hammarby IF	9	(0)
2025–2026	→ Hammarby TFF	17	(5)
2026–	BK Häcken	0	(0)

International career^{‡}
2022	Sweden U16	3	(0)
2024	Sweden U18	3	(0)
2024	Sweden U19	1	(0)
- * Club domestic league appearances and goals as of 29 August 2026 ‡ National team caps and goals as of 16 November 2024

Wilson Elliot Lindberg Uhrström (born 23 March 2006) is a Swedish professional footballer who plays as an attacking midfielder for Allsvenskan club BK Häcken.

== Club career ==
With Hammarby IF's U19 team, Lindberg was the top scorer of P19 Allsvenskan with 20 goals in 25 games, being awarded with U19 Midfielder of the Year. As a result of his strong season, Hammarby IF handed Lindberg a four year-contract and included him in their pre-season camp in early 2025. He received praise from head coach Kim Hellberg: "He has been good. Nice football player.". In October 2025, Lindberg scored a dream goal with HTFF, chipping the goalkeeper from far outside the box.

== International career ==
Lindberg is a youth international for Sweden.

== Style of play ==
He has been described as an offensive player with high quality in his actions, and a strong running capacity.

== Honours ==
Individual

- P19 Allsvenskan Midfielder of the Year: 2024
