= Alexander Ahl Holmström =

Swedish footballer

Personal information
- Full name: Alexander Gustav Kent Ahl Holmström
- Date of birth: 4 April 1999 (age 27)
- Place of birth: Österhaninge, Sweden
- Height: 1.91 m (6 ft 3 in)
- Position: Forward

Team information
- Current team: OB
- Number: 18

Youth career
- –2016: FC Gute
- 2016–2018: Kalmar FF

Senior career*
Years	Team	Apps	(Gls)
2016–2017	FC Gute	13	(2)
2018–2020	Kalmar FF	25	(1)
2019	→ Oskarshamn (loan)	5	(1)
2021	AFC Eskilstuna	28	(9)
2022	Örgryte	27	(2)
2023–2024	GAIS	57	(18)
2025–2026	1. FC Magdeburg	26	(2)
2026–	OB	0	(0)

International career
2019	Sweden U19	2	(0)
- * Club domestic league appearances and goals as of 16 August 2026

Alexander Gustav Kent Ahl Holmström (born 4 April 1999) is a Swedish professional footballer who plays as a forward for Danish Superliga club OB.

== Career ==
Alexander Ahl-Holmström began his career in FC Gute and he had a season with the club's senior team in Division 2, before moving to Kalmar FF as a 17-year-old.

On 11 March 2019, Kalmar FF signed a cooperation agreement Oskarshamns AIK and Holmström alongside his teammate Adrian Edqvist was loaned out to the club on the same day until 30 November 2019. The deal also made it possible to play in both Kalmar's A team and U21 teams while playing for Oskarshamns AIK.

In January 2021, Ahl Holmström was signed by AFC Eskilstuna, where he signed a two-year contract with an option for another year.

On 3 February 2022, Ahl Holmström moved to Örgryte on a two-year contract. On 20 January 2023, he signed with GAIS.

On 12 November 2024, German side 1. FC Magdeburg announced the signing of Ahl Holmström, starting from 2 January 2025.

On 16 August 2026, Ahl Holmström moved to Denmark and signed a three-season contract with OB.
