= Oscar Johansson Schellhas =

Swedish footballer (born 1995)

Personal information
- Full name: Oscar Nils Per Johansson Schellhas
- Date of birth: 6 May 1995 (age 31)
- Place of birth: Gnosjö, Sweden
- Height: 1.78 m (5 ft 10 in)
- Position: Midfielder

Team information
- Current team: Hammarby IF
- Number: 11

Youth career
- Gnosjö IF
- 2012: IFK Värnamo

Senior career*
Years	Team	Apps	(Gls)
2013–2017	IFK Värnamo	113	(14)
2018–2020	Trelleborgs FF	65	(3)
2021–2023	IFK Värnamo	88	(15)
2024–	Hammarby IF	67	(5)

International career
2014–2015	Sweden U19	3	(0)
- * Club domestic league appearances and goals as of 7 November 2026

Oscar Nils Per Johansson Schellhas (born 6 May 1995) is a Swedish professional footballer who plays as a midfielder for Allsvenskan club Hammarby IF.

== Club career ==
Johansson Schellhas scored nine goals and made two assists through 30 matches in the 2017 Superettan for IFK Värnamo. In January 2018, Johansson Schellhas signed a three-year contract with Trelleborgs FF. After the 2020 season, Johansson left the club.

In February 2021, Johansson Schellhas returned to IFK Värnamo, where he signed a two-year contract. He won the 2021 Superettan with the team, reaching promotion to Allsvenskan.

== Honours ==
IFK Värnamo

- Superettan: 2021
