= Markus Karlsson (footballer, born 2004) =

Swedish footballer

Personal information
- Full name: Markus Carl Olof Karlsson
- Date of birth: 20 January 2004 (age 22)
- Place of birth: Stockholm, Sweden
- Height: 1.80 m (5 ft 11 in)
- Positions: Right back; central midfielder

Team information
- Current team: Hammarby IF
- Number: 8

Youth career
- 2009–2022: Hammarby IF

Senior career*
Years	Team	Apps	(Gls)
2022–	Hammarby IF	100	(5)
2022–2023	Hammarby TFF (res.)	25	(0)

International career^{‡}
2019	Sweden U17	1	(0)
2021–2024	Sweden U19	16	(0)
2024–2026	Sweden U21	13	(0)
- * Club domestic league appearances and goals as of 7 November 2026 ‡ National team caps and goals as of 17:41, 1 April 2026 (UTC)

Markus Carl Olof Karlsson (born 20 January 2004) is a Swedish professional footballer who plays as a right back or central midfielder for Hammarby IF in Allsvenskan.

== Early life ==
Born and raised in Stockholm, Karlsson started to play youth football with local club Hammarby IF in 2009, at age five. In 2021, Karlsson was part of the side that finished second in P19 Allsvenskan, after a 2–1 loss to IFK Göteborg in the national final. The team also competed in the 2021–22 UEFA Youth League, getting knocked out by Rangers in the first round through 1–5 on aggregate.

== Club career ==
=== Hammarby IF ===
On 22 December 2021, Karlsson signed a three-year deal with Hammarby, running until the end of 2024, his first professional contact. In 2022, he mostly played for feeder team Hammarby TFF in Ettan, Sweden's third tier, making 19 league appearances.

On 25 February 2023, Karlsson made his competitive debut for Hammarby, coming on as a substitute in a 3–0 away win against Norrby IF in Svenska Cupen. On 25 May 2023, he made his league debut in Allsvenskan, starting as a right back away against Degerfors IF and scoring 0–1 with a left-footed shot in the top corner in a game that would end 2–2. On 10 August 2023, after establishing himself as a starter in the first team, Karlsson signed a new four-and-a-half-year contract with Hammarby, running until the end of 2027.

== International career ==
Between 2019 and 2022, Karlsson was called up to the Swedish under-17's and Swedish under-19's

Karlsson was called up to the Sweden national team for the training tour in Cyprus in early 2024.

== Career statistics ==
=== Club ===
As of match played 13 September 2026

Club	Season	League			National Cup (Note: Includes Svenska Cupen)		Continental		Total	
Club	Season	Division	Apps	Goals	Apps	Goals	Apps	Goals	Apps	Goals
Hammarby TFF (loan)	2022	Ettan	19	0	0	0	—		19	0
Hammarby TFF (loan)	2023	Ettan	6	0	0	0	—		6	0
Hammarby IF	2023	Allsvenskan	19	1	2	0	2 (Note: Appearances in UEFA Europa Conference League)	0	23	1
Hammarby IF	2024	Allsvenskan	25	0	3	0	—		28	0
Hammarby IF	2025	Allsvenskan	28	3	4	0	4	0	36	3
Hammarby IF	2026	Allsvenskan	21	1	6	1	—		14	1
Career total			118	5	15	1	6	0	126	5
