= Hampus Skoglund =

Swedish footballer

Personal information
- Full name: Erik Hampus Skoglund
- Date of birth: 1 March 2004 (age 22)
- Place of birth: Täby, Sweden
- Height: 1.81 m (5 ft 11 in)
- Position: Right-back

Team information
- Current team: Hammarby IF
- Number: 2

Youth career
- –2021: IK Frej
- 2022-2023: Hammarby IF

Senior career*
Years	Team	Apps	(Gls)
2023	Hammarby TFF	13	(1)
2024–	Hammarby IF	83	(0)

International career^{‡}
2024–2026	Sweden U21	15	(1)
2026–	Sweden	2	(0)
- * Club domestic league appearances and goals as of 7 November 2026 ‡ National team caps and goals as of 17:27, 6 October 2026 (UTC)

Erik Hampus Skoglund (born 1 March 2004) is a Swedish professional footballer who plays as a right-back for Allsvenskan club Hammarby IF and the Sweden national team.

== Club career ==
The Täby native Skoglund played football for the local football club IK Frej until he was 17 years old, choosing to join Stockholm side Hammarby IF and its youth academy. In 2023, Skoglund was moved to the senior squad of Hammarby's farm team, Hammarby TFF. Together with HTFF, he participated in 13 games and scored one goal in the Swedish third tier, Ettan Norra.

On 15 March 2024, Hammarby announced Skoglund had signed a four-year contract with the club, joining the senior squad. He made his senior debut as a starter in the premiere round of the 2024 Allsvenskan season against Kalmar FF, which was won 3–1.

== International career ==
On 2 October 2026, Skoglund made his debut for the Sweden national team in a 2026–27 UEFA Nations League B game against Bosnia and Herzegovina.

== Career statistics ==
=== Club ===
As of match played 20 May 2026

Club	Season	League			National Cup (Note: Includes Svenska Cupen)		Continental		Total	
Club	Season	Division	Apps	Goals	Apps	Goals	Apps	Goals	Apps	Goals
Hammarby TFF	2023	Ettan Norra	13	1	0	0	—		13	1
Hammarby IF	2024	Allsvenskan	29	0	0	0	—		29	0
Hammarby IF	2025	Allsvenskan	27	0	4	0	4 (Note: Appearances in UEFA Conference League)	0	31	0
Hammarby IF	2026	Allsvenskan	8	0	6	0	—		14	0
Career total			77	1	10	0	4	0	91	1

=== International ===
As of match played 5 October 2026

Appearances and goals by national team and year
National team	Year	Apps	Goals
Sweden	2026	2	0
Total		2	0
