= Kingsley Gyamfi =

Ghanaian footballer (born 2004)

Personal information
- Date of birth: 15 March 2004 (age 22)
- Place of birth: Ghana
- Position: Centre-back

Team information
- Current team: Öster
- Number: 3

Youth career
- –2022: MŠK Žilina Africa
- 2022: → Hammarby (loan)

Senior career*
Years	Team	Apps	(Gls)
2023	Hammarby TFF	27	(0)
2024–2025	Hammarby	4	(0)
2024	→ Ekenäs IF (loan)	10	(0)
2025	→ Öster (loan)	9	(0)
2025–	Öster	32	(1)
- * Club domestic league appearances and goals as of 12 November 2026

Kingsley Gyamfi (born 15 March 2004) is a Ghanaian professional footballer who plays as a defender for Superettan club Öster.

== Club career ==
Gyamfi made his Allsvenskan debut for Hammarby IF in the 2024 season.

On 22 July 2024, Gyamfi was loaned out to Finnish Veikkausliiga club Ekenäs IF (EIF) for the remainder of the 2024 season.

On 18 June 2025, Gyamfi joined Östers IF on a permanent contract, after spending the first half of the season on loan.

== Career statistics ==
As of 23 October 2024.

Appearances and goals by club, season and competition
Club	Season	League			Cup (Note: Includes Svenska Cupen)		Europe		Other		Total	
Club	Season	Division	Apps	Goals	Apps	Goals	Apps	Goals	Apps	Goals	Apps	Goals
Hammarby Talang	2023	Ettan	27	0	–		–		–		27	0
Hammarby	2024	Allsvenskan	4	0	0	0	–		–		4	0
Ekenäs IF (loan)	2024	Veikkausliiga	10	0	–		–		–		10	0
Öster (loan)	2025	Allsvenskan	9	0	0	0	–		–		0	0
Öster	2025	Allsvenskan	4	0	0	0	–		–		0	0
Career total			54	0	0	0	0	0	0	0	54	0
