= Tesfaldet Tekie =

Swedish footballer (born 1997)

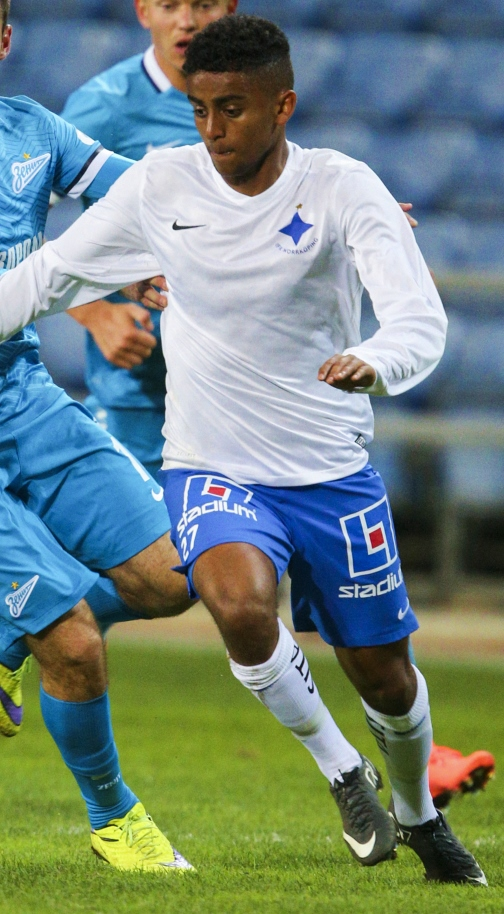
- Tekie playing for IFK Norrköping in 2016

Personal information
- Full name: Tesfaldet Simon Tekie
- Date of birth: 4 June 1997 (age 29)
- Place of birth: Asmara, Eritrea
- Height: 1.75 m (5 ft 9 in)
- Position: Central midfielder

Team information
- Current team: Hammarby IF
- Number: 5

Youth career
- 2008–2010: Marieholm BoIK
- 2010–2013: Gunnilse IS

Senior career*
Years	Team	Apps	(Gls)
2013	Gunnilse IS	6	(0)
2013–2016	IFK Norrköping	32	(0)
2014–2015	→ IF Sylvia (loan)	20	(4)
2017–2019	Gent	0	(0)
2018–2019	→ Östersunds FK (loan)	27	(2)
2019–2022	Fortuna Sittard	80	(2)
2022–2023	Go Ahead Eagles	8	(0)
2023–	Hammarby IF	92	(8)
2023–2024	→ Apollon Limassol (loan)	12	(0)

International career^{‡}
2012	Sweden U17	2	(0)
2015–2016	Sweden U19	8	(0)
2018	Sweden U21	1	(0)
2019	Sweden	1	(0)
2026–	Eritrea	4	(0)
- * Club domestic league appearances and goals as of 7 November 2026 ‡ National team caps and goals as of 16 November 2026

Tesfaldet Simon Tekie (born 4 June 1997) is an Eritrean professional footballer who plays as a central midfielder for Allsvenskan club Hammarby IF and the Eritrea national team. He has also represented Sweden internationally.

== Early life ==
Born in Eritrea, Tekie moved to Gothenburg, Sweden, as a nine-year-old. He started to play youth football with local club Marieholms BoIK, before joining Gunnilse IS in 2010. In 2013, at age 15, Tekie made his debut in senior football with Gunnilse, making six league appearances in Division 3, Sweden's fifth tier.

== Club career ==
=== IFK Norrköping ===
On 6 August 2013, Tekie moved to IFK Norrköping, together with his teammate Ihab Naser from Gunnilse. In 2014, he was sent on loan to affiliated club IF Sylvia in Division 1, the domestic third tier, making 11 appearances.

In 2015, Tekie made six appearances for IFK Norrköping in Allsvenskan, being part of the squad that won the Swedish championship. On 19 July the same year, he signed a new three-and-a-half-year contract with the club.

In 2016, Tekie made 26 league appearances for IFK Norrköping, that finished 3rd in the Allsvenskan table. He also featured in both legs as the club was knocked out in the second qualifying round of the 2016–17 UEFA Champions League, losing 4–5 on aggregate to Rosenborg.

=== Gent ===
On 19 January 2017, Tekie transferred to Belgian First Division A club Gent, signing a three-and-a-half-year contract. The transfer fee was reportedly set at around €1.6 million. Tekie failed to make any competitive appearances for Gent, before leaving the club by mutual consent on 3 September 2019.

==== Loan to Östersunds FK ====
Tekie failed to make any competitive appearances for Gent. On 1 January 2018, he was sent on a one-and-a-half-year loan to Östersunds FK in Allsvenskan. In February, Tekie played in both legs as Östersund was knocked out in the round of 32 in the 2017–18 UEFA Europa League, losing 2–4 on aggregate to Arsenal. He went on to make 15 league appearances for the club in 2018, before his season was cut short in September due to an injury.

In 2019, Tekie remained with Östersund during the first half of the season, making 12 appearances, before returning to Gent in June.

=== Fortuna Sittard ===
On 9 September 2019, Tekie signed a two-year contract with the option of a third with Fortuna Sittard in the Eredivisie. In his debut season in 2019–20, he established himself as a starter for his new club and played 20 games, before the league was abandoned in April 2020 due to the COVID-19 pandemic in the Netherlands.

In 2020–21, Tekie made 33 league appearances, helping Fortuna Sittard to finish 11th in the Eredivisie table. On 30 March 2021, the club decided to exercise their option to extend his contract for one further season.

In 2021–22, Fortuna Sittard finished 15th in the league, one place above the relegation zone, with Tekie making 27 appearances. In May 2022, it was announced that he would leave the club during the summer at the expiration of his contract.

=== Go Ahead Eagles ===
On 8 September 2022, Tekie signed a one-year contract with Go Ahead Eagles. He made eight appearances in the 2022–23 Eredivisie, before leaving on 31 January 2023 by mutual consent after he had struggled to find motivation at the club.

=== Hammarby IF ===
On 9 February 2023, Tekie returned to Sweden and signed a four-year contract with Hammarby IF. After establishing himself as a regular for the club, making 16 league appearances during the first half of the season, he fell out of favor with head coach Martí Cifuentes in August the same year. He returned to Hammarby on 31 January 2024, by request of new head coach Kim Hellberg.

==== Loan to Apollon Limassol ====
On 28 August 2023, he joined Apollon Limassol in the Cypriot First Division on a one-year loan, with an option to buy. On 31 January 2024, the loan agreement was terminated. In total, he made 12 league appearances for Apollon Limassol.

== International career ==
Between 2012 and 2018, Tekie was capped for all Swedish youth teams from the under-17's to the under-21's, making 11 appearances for all selections.

He made his debut for the Sweden men's national football team on 11 January 2019 in a 2–2 friendly against Iceland, as a starter.

Tekie switched his allegiance back to his country of birth, and on 26 September 2026, he made his debut for the Eritrea national team in an AFCON qualifier against Kenya.

== Career statistics ==
=== Club ===
As of 15 October 2025

Club	Season	League			Cup		Continental		Total	
Club	Season	Division	Apps	Goals	Apps	Goals	Apps	Goals	Apps	Goals
Gunnilse IS	2013	Division 3	6	1	0	0	—		6	1
IF Sylvia (loan)	2014	Division 1	11	1	0	0	—		11	1
IF Sylvia (loan)	2015	Division 2	9	3	0	0	—		9	3
Total			26	4	0	0	0	0	26	4
IFK Norrköping	2015	Allsvenskan	6	0	1	0	—		7	0
IFK Norrköping	2016	Allsvenskan	26	0	4	0	2 (Note: Appearances in UEFA Champions League)	0	32	0
IFK Norrköping	Total		32	0	5	0	2	0	39	0
Östersunds FK (loan)	2018	Allsvenskan	15	1	5	1	2 (Note: Appearances in UEFA Europa League)	0	22	2
Östersunds FK (loan)	2019	Allsvenskan	12	1	3	0	—		15	1
Östersunds FK (loan)	Total		27	2	8	1	2	0	37	3
Fortuna Sittard	2019–20	Eredivisie	20	0	3	0	—		23	0
Fortuna Sittard	2020–21	Eredivisie	33	1	2	0	—		35	1
Fortuna Sittard	2021–22	Eredivisie	27	1	1	0	—		28	1
Fortuna Sittard	Total		80	2	6	0	0	0	86	2
Go Ahead Eagles	2022–23	Eredivisie	8	0	2	0	—		10	0
Go Ahead Eagles	Total		8	0	2	0	0	0	10	0
Hammarby IF	2023	Allsvenskan	16	2	5	1	0	0	21	3
Hammarby IF	2024	Allsvenskan	29	4	2	0	—		31	4
Hammarby IF	2025	Allsvenskan	24	1	3	0	3	0	30	1
Total			69	7	10	1	3	0	82	8
Career total			242	15	31	2	7	0	280	17

=== International ===
As of match played 16 November 2026

Appearances and goals by national team and year
National team	Year	Apps	Goals
Eritrea	2026	4	0
Total		4	0

== Honours ==
IFK Norrköping

- Allsvenskan: 2015
