= Grimsta IP =

Sports venue in Vällingby, Sweden

Grimsta Idrottsplats
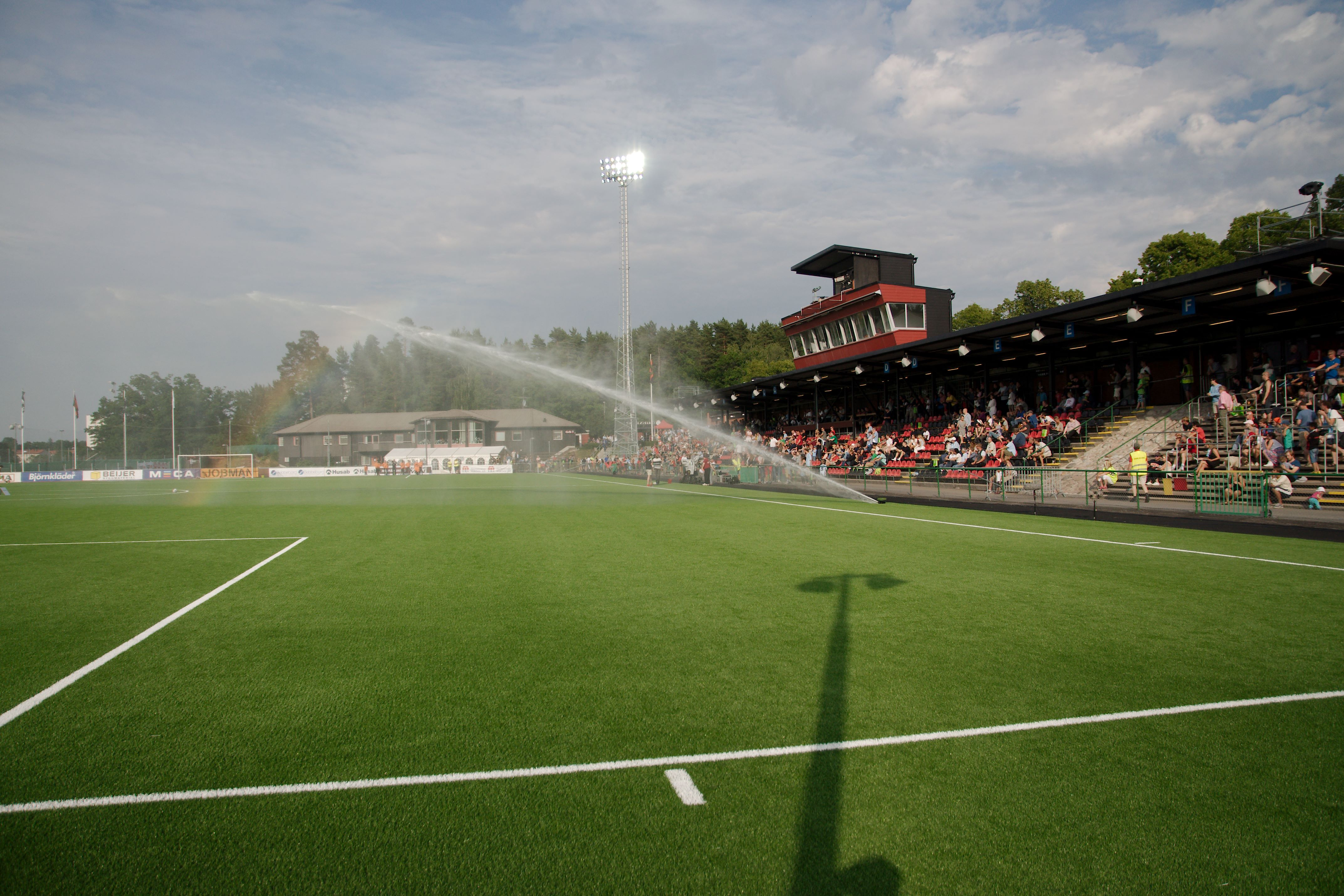
- Interactive map of Grimsta Idrottsplats
- Location: Stockholm, Sweden
- Coordinates: 59°21′44″N 17°51′6″E
- Capacity: 4,729
- Surface: Artificial turf

Construction
- Opened: 1963
- Renovated: 1986; 2006–2007; 2016–2017

Tenant
- IF Brommapojkarna

Grimsta IP is a multi-use stadium in Vällingby, Sweden. It is currently used for football matches and is the home stadium of IF Brommapojkarna. The stadium holds 5,000 people after the latest expansion. The latest expansion took place between 2015 and 2017 with the construction of the new stand that cost 57 million kronor, it includes also the construction of new locker rooms, a new press stand and a new bar. The new stand, with more than 2,000 seats, fulfills the requirement of the Swedish football association for having the license for playing in Superettan and Allsvenskan. The inauguration of the new Grimsta IP was celebrated on 8 April 2017 with the Superettan football game between IF Brommapojkarna and Örgryte IS (3-0) in front of 1,722 spectators.
