= Montader Madjed =

Footballer (born 2005)

Personal information
- Date of birth: 24 April 2005 (age 21)
- Place of birth: Jönköping, Sweden
- Height: 1.82 m (6 ft 0 in)
- Position: Winger

Team information
- Current team: Hammarby IF
- Number: 26

Youth career
- –2020: Östers IF

Senior career*
Years	Team	Apps	(Gls)
2021–2022	Varbergs BoIS	8	(0)
2022–	Hammarby IF	84	(16)
2022–2024	Hammarby TFF	19	(5)

International career^{‡}
2021–2022	Sweden U17	12	(4)
2022–2023	Sweden U19	8	(1)
2024–2026	Iraq	4	(0)
- * Club domestic league appearances and goals as of 7 November 2026 ‡ National team caps and goals as of 11 September 2025

Montader Madjed (Arabic: مُنْتَظِر مَاجِد; born 24 April 2005) is a professional footballer who plays as a winger for Allsvenskan club Hammarby IF and formerly the Iraq national team.

== Early life ==
Madjed was born in Jönköping, Sweden. He started playing youth football with Östers IF.

== Club career ==
=== Varbergs BoIS ===
On 8 January 2021, Madjed was signed by Varbergs BoIS on a three-year contract. He made his first competitive appearance for the club on 4 July, being 16 years and 88 days old, in a 1–1 draw against Kalmar FF, making him the first player born in 2005 to make his debut in Allsvenskan. In total, Madjed made eight league appearances for Varberg in 2021 and 2022.

=== Hammarby IF ===
On 10 August 2022, Madjed transferred to fellow Allsvenskan club Hammarby IF for an undisclosed fee, signing a three-year contract. In 2022, he made 13 league appearances for affiliated club Hammarby TFF in Ettan, Sweden's third tier, scoring five goals, helping the side to finish 6th in the table.

In 2023, he had a flying start to his career with Hammarby's senior team. On 19 February, Madjed scored in his competitive debut for the club, coming on as a substitute in a 4–1 home win against IK Brage in Svenska Cupen. Two weeks later, on 5 March, he scored a hat-trick as a starter an 8–0 win against GIF Sundsvall, helping his side pass the group stage of the domestic cup.

== International career ==
Madjed was eligible to represent both Sweden and Iraq. In July 2021, Madjed was selected for Sweden's U17 national team for two matches against Denmark the following month. Madjed made his debut on 7 August 2021 in a 1–0 loss to Denmark, where he was substituted in the 63rd minute. Three days later, he made his first start in a 4–2 loss against Denmark.

On November 4, 2026, Madjed chose to officially withdraw from the Iraqi national team due to an internal conflict with the country's football federation and coaching staff. He declined his international call-up to shift his full focus to Hammarby.

== Career statistics ==
=== Club ===
As of match played 20 May 2026

Appearances and goals by club, season and competition
Club	Season	League			National cup (Note: Includes Svenska Cupen)		Continental		Total	
Club	Season	Division	Apps	Goals	Apps	Goals	Apps	Goals	Apps	Goals
Varbergs BoIS	2021	Allsvenskan	2	0	1	0	—		3	0
Varbergs BoIS	2022	Allsvenskan	6	0	1	0	—		7	0
Varbergs BoIS	Total		8	0	2	0	0	0	10	0
Hammarby TFF	2022	Ettan	13	5	—		—		13	5
Hammarby TFF	2023	Ettan	4	0	—		—		4	0
Hammarby IF	2023	Allsvenskan	16	1	4	4	0	0	20	5
Hammarby IF	2024	Allsvenskan	15	0	3	0	—		18	0
Hammarby IF	2025	Allsvenskan	26	7	4	3	2	0	32	10
Hammarby IF	2026	Allsvenskan	8	2	7	2	0	0	15	4
Hammarby IF	Total		84	15	18	9	2	0	104	24
Career total			92	15	20	9	2	0	114	24

=== International ===
As of match played 21 March 2024

Appearances and goals by national team and year
National team	Year	Apps	Goals
Iraq	2024	3	0
Total		3	0
