= 2026 IK Sirius Fotboll season =

IK Sirius Fotboll
2026 season
- Chairman: Ulrika Moström Ågren
- Manager: Andreas Engelmark
- Stadium: Studenternas IP
- Allsvenskan: 1st
- 2025–26 Svenska Cupen: Semi-finalist
| colours | colours | colours |

The 2026 is Sirius 119th season in their existence. This season the club will be participating in the following competitions: 2025–26 Svenska Cupen, 2026–27 Svenska Cupen, 2026 Allsvenskan.

== Current squad ==
As of 3 September 2026

Note: Flags indicate national team as defined under FIFA eligibility rules; some limited exceptions apply. Players may hold more than one non-FIFA nationality.

| No. | Pos. | Nation | Player |
|---|---|---|---|
| 1 | GK | MLI | Ismael Diawara |
| 2 | DF | GUI | Mohamed Soumah |
| 4 | DF | DEN | Tobias Anker |
| 5 | DF | SWE | Henrik Castegren |
| 6 | MF | DEN | Marcus Lindberg |
| 7 | FW | SWE | Joakim Persson |
| 8 | MF | NED | Matthias Nartey |
| 9 | FW | NED | Jesper Uneken |
| 10 | MF | SWE | Melker Heier |
| 11 | FW | SWE | Isak Bjerkebo |
| 12 | DF | SWE | Isaac Höök |
| 15 | DF | SWE | Simon Sandberg |

| No. | Pos. | Nation | Player |
|---|---|---|---|
| 16 | MF | FIN | Otso Liimatta |
| 17 | FW | SWE | Neo Jönsson |
| 18 | MF | SWE | Adam Wikman |
| 20 | DF | SWE | Victor Ekström |
| 21 | MF | SWE | Charlie Nildén |
| 22 | DF | SWE | Oscar Krusnell |
| 24 | MF | SWE | Victor Svensson |
| 25 | FW | NGR | Samuel Adindu |
| 30 | FW | HUN | Zalán Vancsa |
| 34 | GK | SWE | David Celic |
| 35 | DF | SWE | Elliot Eld |
| 36 | MF | SWE | August Ljungberg |

== Competitions ==
=== Overall record ===
| Competition | First match | Last match | Starting round | Final position | Record | | | | | | | |
| Competition | First match | Last match | Starting round | Final position | Pld | W | D | L | GF | GA | GD | Win % |
|---|---|---|---|---|---|---|---|---|---|---|---|---|
| Allsvenskan | 4 April 2026 | 29 November 2026 | Matchday 1 | | 26 | 17 | 4 | 5 | 56 | 34 | +22 | 65.38 |
| 2025–26 Svenska Cupen | | | Group stage | Semi Final | 5 | 4 | 0 | 1 | 15 | 6 | +9 | 80.00 |
| 2026–27 Svenska Cupen | 26 August 2026 | | Second Round | | 1 | 1 | 0 | 0 | 2 | 0 | +2 | 100.00 |
| Total | | | | | 32 | 22 | 4 | 6 | 73 | 40 | +33 | 68.75 |

Last updated: 29 October 2026
Source: Soccerway

=== Club Friendlies ===
| 24 January 2026 Friendly | Sirius (Sweden) | 2–1 | (Sweden) Degerfors | Uppsala |
| 13:00 CET (UTC+2) | Adindu 5'; Bjerkebo 60' | Report | Ohlsson 67' | Stadium: Studenternas IP |

| 30 January 2026 Friendly | Sirius (Sweden) | 2–1 | (Denmark) Silkeborg | Uppsala |
| 13:00 CET (UTC+2) | Bjerkebo 44' 57' | Report | Simmelhack 90+2' | Stadium: Studenternas IP |

| 5 February 2026 Friendly | Sirius (Sweden) | 2–3 | (Norway) Sarpsborg 08 | Uppsala |
| 14:00 CET (UTC+2) | Ure 10' 45' | Report | Utvik 23'; Bop Gueye 66'; Opoku 88' | Stadium: Studenternas IP |

| 15 February 2026 Friendly | Sirius (Sweden) | 3–2 | (Norway) Aalesunds FK | Uppsala |
| 14:00 CET (UTC+2) | | Report | | Stadium: Studenternas IP |

| 28 March 2026 Friendly | Sirius (Sweden) | 0–1 | (Finland) Inter Turku | Uppsala |
| 15:00 CET (UTC+2) | | Report | | Stadium: Studenternas IP |

==== League table ====
| Pos | Team | Pld | W | D | L | GF | GA | GD | Pts | Qualification or relegation |
|---|---|---|---|---|---|---|---|---|---|---|
| 1 | Hammarby IF | 28 | 18 | 4 | 6 | 60 | 23 | +37 | 58 | Qualification for the Champions League second qualifying round |
| 2 | IK Sirius | 27 | 18 | 4 | 5 | 58 | 34 | +24 | 58 | Qualification for the Conference League second qualifying round |
| 3 | Djurgårdens IF | 27 | 16 | 4 | 7 | 55 | 25 | +30 | 52 | Qualification for the Conference League second qualifying round |
| 4 | BK Häcken | 27 | 13 | 10 | 4 | 48 | 30 | +18 | 49 | |
| 5 | IF Elfsborg | 28 | 12 | 10 | 6 | 42 | 31 | +11 | 46 | |

Updated to match(es) played on 7 November 2026. Source: svenskfotboll.se (in Swedish)
Rules for classification: 1) Points; 2) Goal difference; 3) Goals scored; 4) Head-to-head points; 5) Head-to-head goal difference; 6) Head-to-head away goals scored; 7) Play-off
(Note: Play-off is only played if need to decide champion, teams for relegation or UEFA competition and will be played on a neutral ground).

==== Results summary ====
| Overall | | | | | | | | Home | | | | | | Away | | | | | |
| Pld | W | D | L | GF | GA | GD | Pts | W | D | L | GF | GA | GD | W | D | L | GF | GA | GD |
|---|---|---|---|---|---|---|---|---|---|---|---|---|---|---|---|---|---|---|---|
| 23 | 17 | 3 | 3 | 53 | 28 | +25 | 54 | 7 | 2 | 2 | 25 | 15 | +10 | 10 | 1 | 1 | 28 | 13 | +15 |

Last updated: 12 May 2024.
Source: worldfootball

==== Results by round ====
| Round | 1 |
|---|---|
| Ground | |
| Result | |
| Position | |

Source: worldfootball
A = Away; H = Home; W = Win; D = Draw; L = Loss

==== Matches ====
| 4 April 2026 1 | Degerfors IF | 0–3 | Sirius | Degerfors |
| 15:00 CEST (UTC+2) | Yiriyon Gideon (yellow card) 53' | Report | Neo Jönsson 46'; Bjerkebo 78' (pen.); Ure 82' | Stadium: Stora Valla; Attendance: 4,015; Referee: (Sweden) Fredrik Klitte |

| 13 April 2026 2 | Sirius | 2–0 | Hammarby | Uppsala |
| 19:00 CET (UTC+2) | Bjerkebo 9'; Ure 70' | Report | Skoglund (yellow card) 66'; Eriksson (yellow card) 80' | Stadium: Studenternas IP; Attendance: 10,306; Referee: (Sweden) Glenn Nyberg |

| 18 April 2026 3 | Sirius | 4–1 | Västerås SK | Uppsala |
| 15:00 CET (UTC+2) | Bjerkebo 8' (pen.) 31' (pen.); Anker 45+2'; Castegren 62'; Lindberg (yellow card) 88' | Report | Nsabiyumva 53' | Stadium: Studenternas IP; Attendance: 9,228; Referee: (Sweden) Erik Mattsson |

| 23 April 2026 4 | Malmö FF | 2–3 | Sirius | Malmö |
| 19:00 CET (UTC+2) | Rosengren (yellow card) 45+3'; Hakšabanović 55'; Skogmar (yellow card) 65' (goal) 77' | Report | Soumah 13'; Persson (yellow card) 45+3'; Bjerkebo 60'; Ure 65'; Neo Jönsson (yellow card) 89' | Stadium: Eleda Stadion; Attendance: 18,535; Referee: (Sweden) Kristoffer Karlsson |

| 27 April 2026 5 | Häcken | 2–2 | Sirius | Gothenburg |
| 19:00 CET (UTC+2) | Rygaard 25'; Lindgren 37' | Report | Ure 40'; Soumah 86'; Krusnell (yellow card) 89' | Stadium: Nordic Wellness Arena; Attendance: 3,504; Referee: (Sweden) Mohammed Al-Hakim |

| 2 May 2026 6 | Sirius | 3–2 | Kalmar | Uppsala |
| 15:00 CET (UTC+2) | Victor Svensson 64'; Bjerkebo 74' (pen.); Adindu 90+1'; Anker (yellow card) 90+4' | Report | Sætra (yellow card) 35'; Charlie Rosenqvist 38'; Jansson 45'; Olusanya (yellow card) 45+2'; Larsson (yellow card) 90' | Stadium: Studenternas IP; Attendance: 8,780; Referee: (Sweden) Richard Sundell |

| 11 May 2026 7 | Sirius | 2–0 | Örgryte | Uppsala |
| 19:00 CET (UTC+2) | Bjerkebo 39' 73' | Report | Christoffer Styffe (yellow card) 20' | Stadium: Studenternas IP; Attendance: 8,609; Referee: (Sweden) Erik Mattsson |

| 18 May 2026 8 | Djurgården | 2–3 | Sirius | Stockholm |
| 19:00 CET (UTC+2) | Anderson 13'; Anker 51' (o.g.); Marqués (yellow card) 86' | Report | Krusnell (yellow card) 35'; Lindberg 38'; Ure 43'; Neo Jönsson 57' (yellow card) 58'; Victor Svensson (yellow card) 85'; Victor Ekström (yellow card) 89' | Stadium: 3Arena; Attendance: 23,636; Referee: (Sweden) Victor Wolf |

| 24 May 2026 9 | Sirius | 2–1 | GAIS | Uppsala |
| 14:00 CET (UTC+2) | Bjerkebo 6'; Victor Ekström 44'; Soumah (red card) 80' | Report | Fagerjord (yellow card) 13'; Niklasson 16'; Beckman (yellow card) 30'; Salter (yellow card) 80' | Stadium: Studenternas IP; Attendance: 9,008; Referee: (Sweden) Kristoffer Karlsson |

| 30 May 2026 10 | AIK Stockholm | 0–3 | Sirius | Stockholm |
| 15:00 CET (UTC+2) | Thychosen (yellow card) 58'; Beširović (yellow card) 83'; Riveiro (yellow card) 89'; Hove (yellow card) 90+1'; Papagiannopoulos (yellow card) 90+4' | Report | Ure 19' 37'; David Celic (yellow card) 31'; Heier (yellow card) 79'; Charlie Nildén (yellow card) 90+4'; Castegren 90+6' | Stadium: Strawberry Arena; Attendance: 28,283; Referee: (Sweden) Fredrik Klitte |

=== Group 8 ===
| Pos | Team | Pld | W | D | L | GF | GA | GD | Pts | Qualification | IKS | IFE | HIF | GIF |
|---|---|---|---|---|---|---|---|---|---|---|---|---|---|---|
| 1 | IK Sirius | 3 | 3 | 0 | 0 | 12 | 2 | +10 | 9 | Advance to Knockout stage | | | 4–1 | 6–0 |
| 2 | IF Elfsborg | 3 | 2 | 0 | 1 | 6 | 2 | +4 | 6 | | 1–2 | | 4–0 | |
| 3 | Helsingborgs IF | 3 | 0 | 1 | 2 | 2 | 9 | −7 | 1 | | | | | 1–1 |
| 4 | GIF Sundsvall | 3 | 0 | 1 | 2 | 1 | 8 | −7 | 1 | | | 0–1 | | |

Source: SvFF
Rules for classification: 1) Points; 2) Goal difference; 3) Goals scored; 4) Head-to-head record; 5) Lowest disciplinary points; 6) Highest ranked team

| 21 February 2026 Group Stage | Sirius | 6–0 | GIF Sundsvall | Uppsala |
| 17:00 CET (UTC+2) | Bjerkebo 14'; Soumah 20' 81'; Ure 40'; Neo Jönsson 67'; Victor Svensson 76' | Report | Yaqub Finey (yellow card) 33' | Stadium: Studenternas IP; Attendance: 1,815; Referee: (Sweden) Glenn Nyberg |

| 1 March 2026 Group Stage | Sirius | 4–1 | Helsingborgs IF | Uppsala |
| 17:00 CET (UTC+2) | Ure 3' 43'; Neo Jönsson (yellow card) 18'; Anker (yellow card) 26' (goal) 29'; Lindberg 66' (yellow card) 75' | Report | Casper Ljung Hofvendahl 65' | Stadium: Studenternas IP; Attendance: 2,185; Referee: (Sweden) Victor Wolf |

| 8 March 2026 Group Stage | IF Elfsborg | 1–2 | Sirius | Borås |
| 13:00 CET (UTC+2) | Mohammed 72'; Frick (yellow card) 90+4' | Report | Ure 15'; Anker (yellow card) 27'; Adindu 49' (yellow card) 86'; Milovanov (yellow card) 90+4' | Stadium: Borås Arena; Attendance: 3,466; Referee: (Sweden) Oscar Johnson |

=== Quarter-finals ===
| 15 March 2026 Quarter-finals | Sirius | 1–0 (a.e.t.) | IFK Göteborg | Uppsala |
| 17:15 CET (UTC+2) | Neo Jönsson (yellow card) 44'; Castegren (yellow card) 60'; Lindberg (yellow card) 75'; Nartey (yellow card) 79'; Bjerkebo 104' (pen.) | Report | Þórðarson (yellow card) 60' | Stadium: Studenternas IP; Attendance: 6,620; Referee: (Sweden) Kristoffer Karlsson |

=== Semi-finals ===
| 22 March 2026 | Hammarby IF (1) | 3–3 (a.e.t.) (4–2 p) | IK Sirius (1) | Stockholm |
| 13:30 UTC+1 | M. Karlsson 56'; Madjed 63'; Besara 105+1' | Report | Jönsson 22'; Ure 78'; Jo. Persson 97' | Stadium: 3Arena; Attendance: 27,135; Referee: Fredrik Klitte |
| | Penalties |
| | Vasić (penalty scored); Winther (penalty scored); Lindberg Uhrström (penalty scored); Johansson Schellhas (penalty scored) | | (penalty missed) Soumah; (penalty scored) Heier; (penalty scored) Krusnell; (penalty missed) Lindberg |

=== 2026–27 Svenska Cupen ===
| | – |
| CEST (UTC+2) |
