= 1996 Svenska Cupen final =

- Event: 1995–96 Svenska Cupen
AIK	Malmö FF
1	0
- After extra time
- Date: 23 May 1996
- Venue: Gamla Ullevi, Gothenburg
- Referee: Christer Fällman (Härnösand)
- Attendance: 2,745

The 1996 Svenska Cupen final took place on 23 May 1996 at Gamla Ullevi in Gothenburg. The match was contested by Allsvenskan sides AIK and Malmö FF. AIK played their first final since 1985 and their 10th final in total, Malmö FF played their first final since 1989 and their 17th final in total. A golden goal in extra time secured AIKs fifth cup title.

== Road to the Final ==
AIK		Round	Malmö FF
Opponent	Result		Opponent	Result
Nacka FF	2–1	Round 1	Kungsbacka BI	1–0
Syrianska FC	10–0	Round 2	Norrby IF	2–1
Älvsjö AIK	4–0	Round 3 Group Stage	IFK Värnamo	1–0
Visby IF Gute	4–0	Round 3 Group Stage	Kalmar AIK	4–0
Spårvägens FF	0–0 (a.e.t.) (4–5 pen)	Round 3 Group Stage	Göteborgs FF	5–0
GIF Sundsvall	2–1 (a.e.t.)	Round 4	Halmstads BK	1–1 (a.e.t.) (3–2 pen)
Örgryte IS	2–1	Quarter-finals	Östers IF	2–1 (a.e.t.)
Hammarby IF	1–0	Semi-finals	IF Brommapojkarna	3–1

== Match details ==
23 May 1996
19.00

AIK	1–0 (a.e.t.)	Malmö FF
Simpson 102'	(Report)

Gamla Ullevi, Gothenburg
Attendance: 2,745
Referee: Christer Fällman (Härnösand)

AIK	Malmö FF

AIK:
GK	(Sweden) Magnus Hedman
RB	(Sweden) Pär Millqvist
CB	(Sweden) Patrick Englund
CB	(Sweden) Johan Mjällby
LB	(Sweden) Gary Sundgren
RM	(Sweden) Krister Nordin
CM	(Sweden) Thomas Lagerlöf	(substituted off) 80'
CM	(Sweden) Ola Andersson
LM	(Sweden) Marco Ciardi
FW	(Sweden) Pascal Simpson
FW	(Sweden) Dick Lidman	(substituted off) 57'
Substitutes:
FW	(Sweden) Patrik Fredholm	(substituted on) 57'
MF	(Sweden) Mattias Johansson	(substituted on) 80'
Manager:
(Sweden) Erik Hamrén

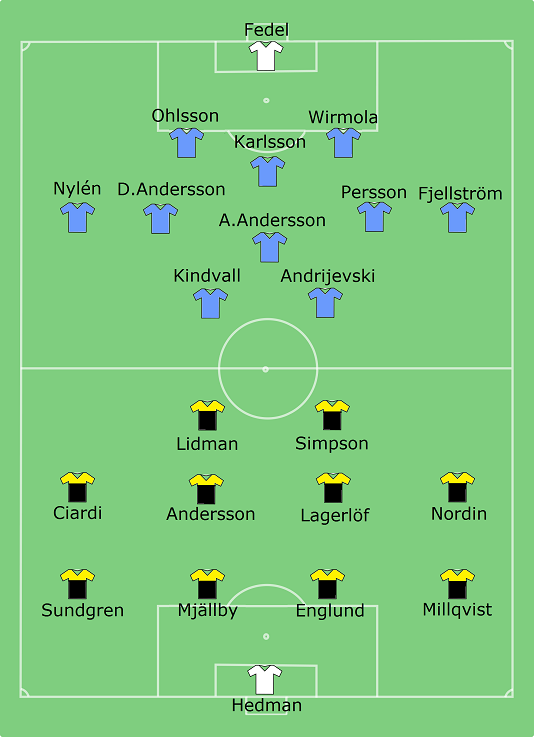

MALMÖ FF:
GK	(Sweden) Jonnie Fedel
RB	(Sweden) Jörgen Ohlsson
CB	(Sweden) Christian Karlsson
LB	(Sweden) Jonas Wirmola
RM	(Sweden) Niclas Nylen
CM	(Sweden) Daniel Andersson
CM	(Sweden) Anders Andersson
CM	(Sweden) Joakim Persson
LM	(Sweden) Jens Fjellström
FW	(Sweden) Niclas Kindvall	(substituted off) 73'
FW	(Sweden) Greger Andrijevski	(substituted off) 73'
Substitutes:
FW	(Sweden) Patrik Olsson	(substituted on) 73'
FW	(Sweden) Yksel Osmanovski	(substituted on) 73'
DF	(Sweden) Tommy Jönsson
Manager:
(Sweden) Rolf Zetterlund

MATCH OFFICIALS

- Assistant referees:
  - Mikael Nilsson (Stora Höga)
  - Peter Mertlin (Gothenburg)

MATCH RULES

- 90 minutes.
- 30 minutes of extra-time if necessary.
- Penalty shoot-out if scores still level.
- Golden goal rule.
