= 2024 IK Sirius Fotboll season =

IK Sirius Fotboll
2024 season
- Manager: Christer Mattiasson
- Stadium: Studenternas IP
- Allsvenskan: 10th
- Top goalscorer: League: Yousef Salech (5); All: Yousef Salech (6)
- Biggest win: Sirius 3–0 Halmstad
- Biggest defeat: Sirius 0–3 Häcken

The 2024 is IK Sirius Fotboll's 117th season in their existence. They are scheduled to take part in the top flight Allsvenskan and the Svenska Cupen. The club's home stadium is Studenternas IP, Uppsala.

== Players ==
=== First-team squad ===
As of 27 March 2024

Note: Flags indicate national team as defined under FIFA eligibility rules; some limited exceptions apply. Players may hold more than one non-FIFA nationality.

No.	Pos.	Nation	Player
1	GK	MKD	David Mitov Nilsson
2	DF	SWE	Patrick Nwadike
4	DF	SWE	Henrik Castegren
5	DF	SWE	Tobias Carlsson
6	MF	GER	Michael Martin
7	FW	SWE	Joakim Persson
8	MF	SWE	Daniel Stensson
9	FW	DEN	Yousef Salech
10	MF	SWE	Melker Heier
11	MF	SWE	Filip Olsson
13	DF	SWE	Jakob Voelkerling Persson
14	MF	FIN	Leo Walta
15	DF	SWE	Andreas Murbeck

No.	Pos.	Nation	Player
16	FW	SWE	Herman Sjögrell
17	MF	DEN	Marcus Lindberg
18	MF	SWE	Adam Wikman
19	FW	SWE	Noel Milleskog
20	DF	SWE	Victor Ekström
21	DF	SWE	Dennis Widgren
22	MF	IRQ	André Alsanati
26	MF	SWE	Hugo Mella
27	MF	SWE	Emil Özkan
30	GK	SWE	Jakob Tånnander
31	DF	SWE	Malcolm Jeng
34	GK	SWE	David Celic
36	MF	SWE	August Ljungberg

=== Out on loan ===
Note: Flags indicate national team as defined under FIFA eligibility rules; some limited exceptions apply. Players may hold more than one non-FIFA nationality.

No.	Pos.	Nation	Player
—	GK	SWE	Hannes Sveijer (at AFC Eskilstuna until 30 November 2024)
—	DF	CPV	Kristopher Da Graca (at KuPS until 31 December 2024)

No.	Pos.	Nation	Player
—	DF	ISL	Óli Ómarsson (at Stjarnan until 31 December 2024)
—	FW	KOS	Edi Sylisufaj (at Örgryte until 30 November 2024)

== Competitions ==
=== Overall record ===
Competition	First match	Last match	Starting round	Final position	Record							
Competition	First match	Last match	Starting round	Final position	Pld	W	D	L	GF	GA	GD	Win %
Allsvenskan	31 March 2024	November 2024	Matchday 1		8	3	1	4	9	11	−2	37.50
2023–24 Svenska Cupen			Group stage	Group stage	3	1	2	0	4	2	+2	33.33
2024–25 Svenska Cupen					0	0	0	0	0	0	+0	—
Total					11	4	3	4	13	13	+0	36.36

Last updated: 12 May 2024
Source: Soccerway

==== League table ====
Pos	Team	Pld	W	D	L	GF	GA	GD	Pts	Qualification or relegation
7	IF Elfsborg	30	13	6	11	52	44	+8	45	
8	BK Häcken	30	12	6	12	54	51	+3	42	Qualification for the Europa League first qualifying round (Note: BK Häcken qualified for the Europa League first qualifying round as the 2024–25 Svenska Cupen winners.)
9	IK Sirius	30	12	5	13	47	46	+1	41	
10	IF Brommapojkarna	30	8	10	12	46	53	−7	34	
11	IFK Norrköping	30	9	7	14	36	57	−21	34	

Source: svenskfotboll.se (in Swedish)
Rules for classification: 1) Points; 2) Goal difference; 3) Goals scored; 4) Head-to-head points; 5) Head-to-head goal difference; 6) Head-to-head away goals scored; 7) Play-off
(Note: Play-off is only played if need to decide champion, teams for relegation or UEFA competition and will be played on a neutral ground).

==== Results summary ====
Overall								Home						Away					
Pld	W	D	L	GF	GA	GD	Pts	W	D	L	GF	GA	GD	W	D	L	GF	GA	GD
8	3	1	4	9	11	−2	10	1	0	2	3	4	−1	2	1	2	6	7	−1

Last updated: 12 May 2024.
Source: Worldfootball

==== Results by round ====
Round	1	2	3	4	5	6	7	8	9
Ground	H	A	A	H	A	A	H	A	H
Result	W	W	L	L	D	L	L	W	
Position	4	2	5	8	9	11	13	10	

Updated to match(es) played on 12 May 2024. Source: Worldfootball
A = Away; H = Home; W = Win; D = Draw; L = Loss

==== Matches ====
The first 12 rounds were unveiled on 16 January 2024.

1 April 2024 1	Sirius	3–0	Halmstad	Uppsala
CEST (UTC+2)				Stadium: Studenternas IP

8 April 2024 2	Kalmar FF	1–2	Sirius	Kalmar
19:00 CEST (UTC+2)				Stadium: Guldfågeln Arena; Referee: Adi Aganovic

14 April 2024 3	Djurgården	2–0	Sirius
CEST (UTC+2)

20 April 2024 4	Sirius	0–1	IFK Värnamo	Uppsala
CEST (UTC+2)				Stadium: Studenternas IP

24 April 2024 5	IF Brommapojkarna	1–1	Sirius	Vällingby
19:00 CEST (UTC+2)	Vasić 51'; Björkander (yellow card) 54' (yellow-red card)		Milleskog 59'	Stadium: Grimsta IP; Referee: Richard Sundell

29 April 2024 6	IF Elfsborg	2–0	Sirius	Borås
19:00 CEST (UTC+2)	Zeneli 45+5'; Frick 59'			Stadium: Borås Arena; Referee: Fredrik Klitte

4 May 2024 7	Sirius	0–3	Häcken	Uppsala
17:30 CEST (UTC+2)			Lindberg 6'; Hrstić 17'; Inoussa 27'	Stadium: Studenternas IP; Referee: Joakim Östling

11 May 2024 8	AIK	1–3	Sirius	Solna
15:00 CEST (UTC+2)	Celina 90+6'		Milleskog 25'; Salech 53', 63'	Stadium: Friends Arena; Referee: Adam Ladebäck

16 May 2024 9	Sirius	v	IFK Göteborg	Uppsala
19:00 CEST (UTC+2)				Stadium: Studenternas IP

=== 2023–24 Svenska Cupen ===
==== Group stage ====
Pos	Team	Pld	W	D	L	GF	GA	GD	Pts	Qualification	IFKN	IKS	IKB	UBK
1	IFK Norrköping	3	1	2	0	7	3	+4	5	Advance to Knockout stage			1–1	4–0
2	IK Sirius	3	1	2	0	4	2	+2	5		2–2			2–0
3	IK Brage	3	1	2	0	4	2	+2	5			0–0		
4	Utsiktens BK	3	0	0	3	1	9	−8	0				1–3	

Source: SvFF
Rules for classification: 1) Points; 2) Goal difference; 3) Goals scored; 4) Head-to-head record; 5) Lowest disciplinary points; 6) Highest ranked team
