= Saba Mamatsashvili =

Georgian footballer (born 2002)

Personal information
- Date of birth: 23 August 2002 (age 24)
- Place of birth: Tbilisi, Georgia
- Height: 1.83 m (6 ft 0 in)
- Position: Left back

Youth career
- 2011–2020: Saburtalo

Senior career*
Years	Team	Apps	(Gls)
2021–24	Saburtalo	42	(4)
2023	→ Gagra (loan)	15	(4)
2024–	Sirius	18	(2)
2025	→ Kalmar (loan)	13	(3)
2026	→ Žalgiris (loan)	24	(0)

International career^{‡}
2023–	Georgia U21	15	(1)
- * Club domestic league appearances and goals as of 7 September 2026 ‡ National team caps and goals as of 7 June 2025

Saba Mamatsashvili (Georgian: საბა მამაცაშვილი; born 23 August 2002) is a Georgian professional footballer who plays as a left back for Lithuanian top-flight club Žalgiris, on loan from Sirius.

He has won the Georgian Cup and represented his country in the various national youth teams, most notably in U21s.

== Career ==
=== Club ===
Mamatsashvili was five years old when he entered a football school. Initially, he played for Norchi Dinamo and Locomotive before joining Saburtalo's academy in 2011. He advanced first to the reserve team in Liga 3 and after 2021 to the main team. Mamatsashvili made his debut in the Erovnuli Liga as a substitute in a 2–0 win over Samtredia on 29 September 2021. The Lelo sport newspaper noticed the new player with his attacking display, ball control and crosses and in a special article predicted that he was a promising player.

In his first full season at Saburtalo in the same year, Mamatsashvili won the Georgian Cup.

On 8 October 2022, Mamatsashvili scored his first official goal to give Saburtalo the lead in a 2–1 win against Gagra.

The next year, it was Gagra where he continued his career on a six-month loan deal. After contributing with four goals in 15 league matches, Mamatsashvili returned to Saburtalo in early 2024.

In August 2024, the player signed a contract with Allsvenskan club Sirius expiring on 30 June 2029. On his tenth game for the club, Mamatsashvili netted his first Swedish goal, scoring directly from a corner kick in a 1–1 away draw against Malmö FF.

In August 2025, Mamatsashvili signed a loan deal with 2nd division side Kalmar and helped them gain promotion to the top tier. In January 2026, he was loaned to Lithuanian club Žalgiris.

=== International ===
In September 2017, Mamatsashvili was called up to the national under-16 team for friendly ties against Azerbaijan. He also featured with U17s in the annual Development Cup held in Minsk. In October 2019, he became a member of the U18 team who played two friendlies against Estonia.

As the U21 team was gearing up for its 2025 European Championship qualifying campaign, coach Ramaz Svanadze named Mamatsashvili in his 23-men squad. He took part in 10 qualifiers, scoring a winner against North Macedonia.

In a return leg against Croatia in 2025 UEFA European Under-21 Championship qualification play-offs on 19 November 2024, Mamatsashvili was in the starting line-up. His team prevailed over their opponents in penalty shootout, which sent Georgia to the final stages of the competition.

== Career statistics ==
As of 24 January 2026

Appearances and goals by club, season and competition
Club	Season	League			National cup		Continental		Other		Total	
Club	Season	Division	Apps	Goals	Apps	Goals	Apps	Goals	Apps	Goals	Apps	Goals
Saburtalo	2021	Erovnuli Liga	7	0	1	0	—		—		8	0
Saburtalo	2022	Erovnuli Liga	15	1	3	0	—		—		18	1
Saburtalo	2023	Erovnuli Liga	2	0	—		—		—		2	0
Saburtalo	2024	Erovnuli Liga	18	3	1	1	—		2 (Note: Appearances in Georgian Super Cup)	1	21	5
Saburtalo	Total		42	4	5	1	0	0	2	1	49	6
Gagra (loan)	2023	Erovnuli Liga	15	4	1	0	—		—		16	4
Sirius	2024	Allsvenskan	6	0	—		—		—		6	0
Sirius	2025	Allsvenskan	12	2	3	0	—		—		15	2
Sirius	Total		18	2	3	0	0	0	0	0	21	2
Kalmar (loan)	2025	Superettan	13	3	—		—		—		13	3
Career total			88	13	9	1	0	0	2	1	99	15

== Honours ==
Saburtalo

- Erovnuli Liga: 2021

Kalmar

- Superettan runner-up: 2025
