= Umbro Cup =

Tournament details
- Host country: England
- Dates: 3–11 June 1995
- Teams: 4 (from 3 confederations)
- Venues: 5 (in 5 host cities)

Final positions
- Champions: Brazil
- Runners-up: England
- Third place: Sweden
- Fourth place: Japan

Tournament statistics
- Matches played: 6
- Goals scored: 21 (3.5 per match)
- Attendance: 175,517 (29,253 per match)
- Top scorer(s): (Sweden) Kennet Andersson (3 goals)

The Umbro Cup was a friendly international football competition that took place in England in June 1995. The trophy was sponsored by the sports equipment brand Umbro, the manufacturers of the England national team's kit.

Host nation England, Sweden, Japan and world champions Brazil participated in the tournament. Brazil were the eventual champions, after winning all three of their games.

The staging of the competition served as a rehearsal for England's hosting of UEFA Euro 1996 the following summer. Matches took place at Wembley Stadium, Elland Road, Goodison Park, Villa Park and the City Ground.

== Background ==
England did not compete in the 1994 FIFA World Cup due to coming third in Group 2 in the qualifying round. This led to Graham Taylor resigning on 23 November 1993, six days after England's failure to qualify. England then appointed Terry Venables as manager on 28 January 1994. This, combined with the fact that England qualified automatically for UEFA Euro 1996 as hosts, meant that by mid-1995 the team had not played competitive football for more than 18 months. In preparation for Euro 1996 a rehearsal tournament was organised and sponsored by Umbro.

Venables named a 23-man squad for the competition, but was missing some choices due to injuries. Two players, Paul Ince and Andy Cole withdrew later and were replaced by Jamie Redknapp and Warren Barton. Later in Venables' 2014 book it was said that Ince was "frozen out" of the squad.

== Tournament ==
In the opening round of matches, England beat Japan, and Brazil beat Sweden.

Brazil comfortably beat Japan in their second game. On 8 June, Sweden were leading 3–1 against England but their opponents scored twice in the last two minutes to snatch a draw.

In the final match of the tournament, Brazil beat England.

== Venues ==
London	Liverpool	Birmingham	Leeds	Nottingham
Wembley	Goodison Park	Villa Park	Elland Road	City Ground
	Goodison Park			

== Results ==
All times listed are British Summer Time (UTC+1)

=== England vs Japan ===
The first match of the tournament took place at Wembley and pitted England against Japan. Due to several injuries, four players made their England debuts, leading to a line-up which Veneables described as "a little disjointed". Darren Anderton gave England the lead shortly after the half-time interval but Masami Ihara equalised for Japan. England's captain, David Platt, was fouled late in the game but the referee opted not to award a penalty kick. With only two minutes of the game remaining, Japan's captain, Tetsuji Hashiratani, used his hand to stop the ball going into the goal. He was sent off and a penalty awarded, which Platt scored to give England a 2–1 victory.

3 June 1995
14:00

England	2–1	Japan
Anderton 48'; Platt 88' (pen.)	Report	Ihara 62'

Wembley Stadium, London
Attendance: 21,142
Referee: Jaap Uilenberg (Netherlands)

England	Japan

GK	1	Tim Flowers
DF	12	Gary Neville
DF	5	John Scales
DF	15	David Unsworth
DF	14	Stuart Pearce
MF	11	Darren Anderton
MF	7	David Platt (c)
MF	4	David Batty		(substituted off) 68'
MF	8	Peter Beardsley	(yellow card) 25'	(substituted off) 68'
FW	9	Alan Shearer
FW	6	Stan Collymore		(substituted off) 76'
Substitutions:
MF	17	Steve McManaman		(substituted on) 68'
MF	19	Paul Gascoigne		(substituted on) 68'
FW	22	Teddy Sheringham		(substituted on) 76'
Manager:
Terry Venables

GK	13	Kazuya Maekawa
DF	19	Kazuaki Tasaka
DF	5	Tetsuji Hashiratani (c)	(red card) 87'
DF	4	Masami Ihara
MF	2	Akira Narahashi
MF	15	Hiroaki Morishima		(substituted off) 81'
MF	6	Motohiro Yamaguchi
MF	8	Tsuyoshi Kitazawa
MF	20	Naoki Soma		(substituted off) 74'
FW	11	Kazuyoshi Miura
FW	14	Masashi Nakayama		(substituted off) 65'
Substitutions:
FW	9	Hisashi Kurosaki		(substituted on) 65'
MF	3	Hiroshige Yanagimoto		(substituted on) 74'
MF	16	Masahiro Fukuda		(substituted on) 81'
Manager:
Shu Kamo

=== Brazil vs Sweden ===
4 June 1995
16:00

Brazil	1–0	Sweden
Edmundo 42'	Report

Villa Park, Birmingham
Attendance: 20,131
Referee: Dick Jol (Netherlands)

Brazil	Sweden

GK	1	Zetti
RB	2	Jorginho
CB	3	Aldair	Yellow card
CB	4	Ronaldão
LB	6	Roberto Carlos
DM	8	Dunga (c)
DM	5	César Sampaio		(substituted off) 77'
AM	11	Zinho
AM	10	Juninho Paulista
FW	7	Edmundo
FW	9	Ronaldo
Substitutions:
DF	16	André Cruz		(substituted on) 77'
Manager:
Mário Zagallo

GK	12	Bengt Andersson
DF	14	Pontus Kåmark
DF	15	Teddy Lučić
DF	4	Joachim Björklund
DF	5	Roger Ljung
MF	9	Jonas Thern (c)		(substituted off) 46'
MF	16	Niclas Alexandersson
MF	8	Håkan Mild
MF	21	Magnus Erlingmark
FW	10	Martin Dahlin	Yellow card	(substituted off) 78'
FW	11	Kennet Andersson		(substituted off) 67'
Substitutions:
MF	19	Niklas Gudmundsson		(substituted on) 46'
FW	17	Henrik Larsson		(substituted on) 67'
FW	21	Dick Lidman		(substituted on) 78'
Manager:
Tommy Svensson

=== Japan vs Brazil ===
6 June 1995
20:00

Japan	0–3	Brazil
	[[[Category:All articles with unsourced statements]] Report]	Roberto Carlos 7'; Zinho 52', 64'

Goodison Park, Liverpool
Attendance: 29,327
Referee: Jim McCluskey (Scotland)

Japan	Brazil

GK	1	Nobuyuki Kojima
SW	4	Masami Ihara
DF	2	Akira Narahashi
DF	19	Kazuaki Tasaka	(substituted off) 80'
DF	17	Norio Omura
DF	20	Naoki Soma
MF	15	Hiroaki Morishima	(substituted off) 67'
MF	8	Tsuyoshi Kitazawa
MF	6	Motohiro Yamaguchi
MF	11	Kazuyoshi Miura
FW	14	Masashi Nakayama	(substituted off) 46'
Substitutions:
FW	16	Masahiro Fukuda	(substituted on) 46'
FW	9	Hisashi Kurosaki	(substituted on) 67'
DF	3	Hiroshige Yanagimoto	(substituted on) 80'
Manager:
Shu Kamo

GK	1	Zetti
DF	2	Jorginho
DF	3	Aldair
DF	4	Márcio Santos
DF	6	Roberto Carlos
MF	10	Juninho Paulista	(substituted off) 61'
MF	8	Dunga (c)
MF	5	Doriva
MF	11	Zinho	(substituted off) 73'
FW	7	Edmundo
FW	9	Ronaldo
Substitutions:
MF	13	Leonardo	(substituted on) 61'
FW	15	Rivaldo	(substituted on) 73'
Manager:
Mário Zagallo

=== England vs Sweden ===
8 June 1995
20:00

England	3–3	Sweden
Sheringham 44'; Platt 89'; Anderton 90+1'	Report	Mild 11', 37'; K. Andersson 46'

Elland Road, Leeds
Attendance: 32,008
Referee: Leslie Mottram (Scotland)

England	Sweden

GK	1	Tim Flowers
DF	2	Warren Barton
DF	21	Colin Cooper
DF	12	Gary Pallister	(substituted off) 80'
DF	3	Graeme Le Saux
MF	11	Darren Anderton
MF	8	Peter Beardsley	(substituted off) 63'
MF	7	David Platt (c)
MF	10	John Barnes	(substituted off) 63'
FW	9	Alan Shearer
FW	22	Teddy Sheringham
Substitutions:
MF	18	Nick Barmby	(substituted on) 63'
MF	19	Paul Gascoigne	(substituted on) 63'
DF	5	John Scales	(substituted on) 80'
Manager:
Terry Venables

GK	1	Thomas Ravelli (c)
DF	2	Gary Sundgren
DF	15	Teddy Lučić
DF	4	Joachim Björklund
DF	14	Pontus Kåmark
MF	16	Niclas Alexandersson
MF	20	Magnus Erlingmark	(substituted off) 88'
MF	8	Håkan Mild
MF	19	Niklas Gudmundsson
FW	17	Henrik Larsson
FW	11	Kennet Andersson	(substituted off) 85'
Substitutions:
FW	21	Dick Lidman	(substituted on) 85'
MF	18	Ola Andersson	(substituted on) 88'
Manager:
Tommy Svensson

=== Sweden vs Japan ===
10 June 1995
14:00

Sweden	2–2	Japan
K. Andersson 53', 68'	Report	Fujita 9'; Kurosaki 86'

City Ground, Nottingham
Attendance: 5,591
Referee: Angelo Amendolia (Italy)

Sweden	Japan

GK	1	Thomas Ravelli (c)
DF	2	Gary Sundgren
DF	15	Teddy Lučić
DF	4	Joachim Björklund
DF	14	Pontus Kåmark
MF	16	Niclas Alexandersson
MF	7	Peter Wibrån
MF	18	Ola Andersson
MF	19	Niklas Gudmundsson	(substituted off) 73'
FW	11	Kennet Andersson
FW	17	Henrik Larsson
Substitutions:
DF	13	Mikael Nilsson	(substituted on) 73'
Manager:
Tommy Svensson

GK	22	Kenichi Shimokawa
DF	2	Akira Narahashi	(substituted off) 85'
DF	4	Masami Ihara
DF	5	Tetsuji Hashiratani (c)
DF	17	Norio Omura
MF	18	Toshiya Fujita	(substituted off) 71'
MF	6	Motohiro Yamaguchi
MF	8	Tsuyoshi Kitazawa	(substituted off) 81'
MF	20	Naoki Soma
FW	11	Kazuyoshi Miura
FW	9	Hisashi Kurosaki
Substitutions:
MF	7	Hajime Moriyasu	(substituted on) 71'
FW	16	Masahiro Fukuda	(substituted on) 81'
DF	3	Hiroshige Yanagimoto	(substituted on) 85'
Manager:
Shu Kamo

=== England vs Brazil ===
11 June 1995
16:00

England	1–3	Brazil
Le Saux 39'	Report	Juninho 55'; Ronaldo 62'; Edmundo 77'

Wembley Stadium, London
Attendance: 67,318
Referee: Pierluigi Pairetto (Italy)

England	Brazil

GK	1	Tim Flowers
DF	12	Gary Neville
DF	5	John Scales		(substituted off) 90'
DF	21	Colin Cooper	(yellow card) 62'
DF	14	Stuart Pearce
MF	11	Darren Anderton
MF	4	David Batty	(yellow card) 68'	(substituted off) 79'
MF	7	David Platt (c)
MF	3	Graeme Le Saux
FW	9	Alan Shearer		(substituted off) 90'
FW	22	Teddy Sheringham
Substitutions:
MF	19	Paul Gascoigne		(substituted on) 79'
DF	2	Warren Barton		(substituted on) 90'
FW	6	Stan Collymore		(substituted on) 90'
Manager:
Terry Venables

GK	1	Zetti
DF	2	Jorginho
DF	3	Aldair		(substituted off) 89'
DF	15	Márcio Santos
DF	6	Roberto Carlos	(yellow card) 71'
MF	8	Dunga (c)
MF	5	César Sampaio
MF	11	Zinho
FW	10	Juninho Paulista		(substituted off) 84'
FW	7	Edmundo	(yellow card) 42'
FW	9	Ronaldo		(substituted off) 76'
Substitutions:
FW	21	Giovanni		(substituted on) 76'
MF	19	Leonardo		(substituted on) 84'
DF	4	Ronaldão		(substituted on) 89'
Manager:
Mário Zagallo

== Standings ==
Team	Pld	W	D	L	GF	GA	GD	Pts
Brazil	3	3	0	0	7	1	+6	9
England	3	1	1	1	6	7	–1	4
Sweden	3	0	2	1	5	6	–1	2
Japan	3	0	1	2	3	7	–4	1

== Goalscorers ==
3 goals

- (Sweden) Kennet Andersson

2 goals

- (Brazil) Edmundo
- (Brazil) Zinho
- (England) Darren Anderton
- (England) David Platt
- (Sweden) Håkan Mild

1 goal

- (Brazil) Juninho Paulista
- (Brazil) Roberto Carlos
- (Brazil) Ronaldo
- (England) Graeme Le Saux
- (England) Teddy Sheringham
- (Japan) Hisashi Kurosaki
- (Japan) Masami Ihara
- (Japan) Toshiya Fujita

== Books ==
- Venables, Terry; Alex, Montgomery (2014), Born to Manage: The Autobiography, Simon & Schuster, ISBN 978-1-47112-991-9
