= Pascal Simpson =

Swedish footballer

Personal information
- Date of birth: 4 May 1971 (age 55)
- Place of birth: Lomé, Togo
- Height: 1.92 m (6 ft 4 in)
- Position: Forward

Youth career
- 1978–1983: Ekerö IK
- 1984–1990: IF Brommapojkarna

Senior career*
Years	Team	Apps	(Gls)
1990	IF Brommapojkarna	26	(5)
1991–1998	AIK	161	(48)
1998–2000	Vålerenga IF	51	(11)
2001–2003	FC Copenhagen	23	(3)
2002	→ Halmstads BK (loan)	11	(3)
Total		272	(70)

International career
1991–1992	Sweden U21/O	7	(3)
1996	Sweden B	1	(0)
1997	Sweden	2	(0)

Managerial career
- 2004–2006: IF Brommapojkarna (youth coach)
- 2007: IFK Eskilstuna
- 2008–2009: IF Brommapojkarna (youth coach)
- 2010: Gröndals IK
- 2011–2012: IF Brommapojkarna (youth coach)
- 2013: Enebybergs IF
- 2014: Ekerö IK
- 2015: Södertälje FK
- 2015–2016: Vasalunds IF
- * Club domestic league appearances and goals

Pascal "Pagge" Simpson (born 4 May 1971) is a former professional footballer who played as a forward. He played for IF Brommapojkarna, AIK, Vålerenga IF, FC Copenhagen, and Halmstads BK during a career that spanned between 1990 and 2003. Born in Togo, he won two caps for the Sweden national team in 1997 and also represented the Sweden Olympic team at the 1992 Summer Olympics.

== Early life ==
Simpson was born in Lomé, Togo, to a Togolese father and a German mother, moved to Sweden at the age of six and was raised on Ekerö, Stockholm. His father had played professional football in Germany. He acquired Swedish citizenship in September 1991.

== Club career ==
Simpson started his football career in Ekerö IK and joined IF Brommapojkarna in 1988. He won the JSM för klubblag with the IF Brommapojkarna youth squad in 1989 and made his senior debut in 1990.

He joined AIK and was part of the AIK squad that won the Swedish Championship in 1992, its first such championship in 55 years. Simpson contributed significantly to the win. He scored twice against FC Barcelona in the 1997 Cup Winners Cup quarter-finals; at Camp Nou he stunned the Catalans by scoring in the first minute of play. He was also part of the AIK squad that won the Swedish cup in 1996 and 1997. In the 1996 cup final he scored the winning goal against Malmö FF.

Simpson had severe leg and knee problems due to a ligament injury. He had surgery in 1997 but in the end this damage caused his footballing career to come to an early end. The knee injury has caused Simpson severe pain, stopping him from running and jogging. Despite this, he has stayed involved with football by coaching youth for Brommapojkarna and lower league clubs. In 2007, he was the coach for IFK Eskilstuna but left due to the club's financial problems.

== International career ==
Simpson played seven matches for the Swedish Olympic football team in 1991 and 1992. He scored the qualifying goal for the Swedish Olympic football team against the Netherlands that landed the team a spot at the 1992 Olympics in Barcelona.

Simpson made his full international debut for the Sweden national team on 9 February 1997 in a 2–0 friendly win against Romania, playing for 67 minutes alongside Marino Rahmberg at forward before being replaced by Robert Steiner. He won his second and last cap four days later in a friendly 1–0 win against Japan, playing for 76 minutes before being substituted by Daniel Andersson.

== Coaching career ==
Simpson managed Södertälje FK. In December 2015, it was announced that Simpson was taking over Swedish third-tier team Vasalund after Roberth Björknesjö. His first game in charge was a pre-season 5–4 victory over his old club AIK.

== Career statistics ==
=== International ===
Appearances and goals by national team and year
National team	Year	Apps	Goals
Sweden	1997	2	0
Total		2	0

== Honours ==
AIK

- Swedish Champion: 1992
- Svenska Cupen: 1995–96, 1996–97

FC Copenhagen

- Danish Superliga: 2000–01, 2002–03
