= Krister Nordin =

Swedish footballer (born 1968)

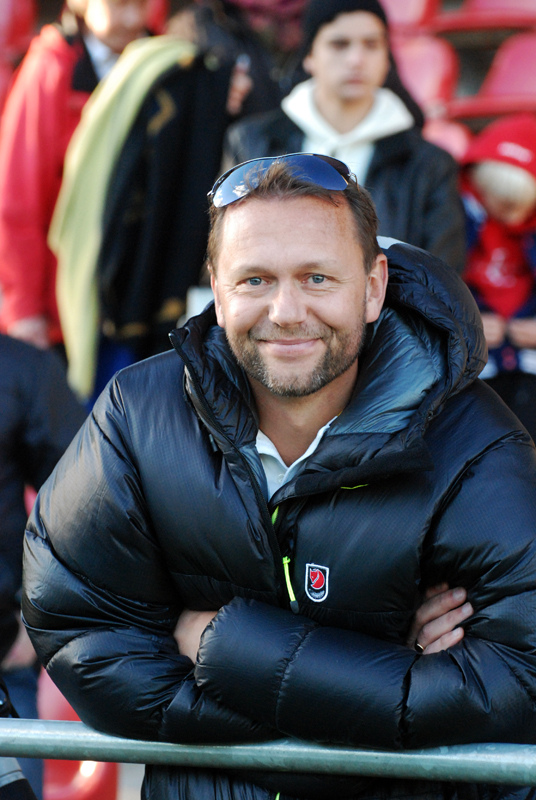
- Nordin in 2012

Personal information
- Full name: Hans Krister Nordin
- Date of birth: 25 February 1968 (age 58)
- Place of birth: Stockholm, Sweden
- Height: 1.85 m (6 ft 1 in)
- Position: Midfielder

Youth career
- 1973–1979: IFK Bergshamra
- 1980–1981: Råsunda IS
- 1982–1986: Djurgårdens IF

Senior career*
Years	Team	Apps	(Gls)
1987–1991	Djurgårdens IF	107	(16)
1992–1999	AIK	177	(28)
2000–2002	Brøndby IF	58	(4)
2002–2004	AIK	45	(8)
2005	Ekerö IK		

International career
1990	Sweden U21	2	(0)
- * Club domestic league appearances and goals

Hans Krister Nordin (born 25 February 1968) is a Swedish former professional footballer who played as a midfielder. He spent most of his career with Allsvenskan club AIK.

== Club career ==
Born in Stockholm, Nordin started playing football with local clubs IFK Bergshamra and Råsunda IS as a boy. He became a part of the youth setup at Djurgårdens IF in 1982, where he later made his senior debut. He won the 1990 Swedish Cup with Djurgården, before moving to league rivals AIK in 1992. He won the Allsvenskan championship in his first year at the club, and went on to win three Swedish Cups and a further Allsvenskan title. He won the 1999 Swedish Midfielder of the Year award, before leaving the club in winter 1999.

He moved to Brøndby IF in Denmark, who bought a number of Scandinavian players that year, under Norwegian manager Åge Hareide. In his two years in Brøndby, Nordin was named 2001 "Brøndby Player of the Year" and won the 2002 Danish Superliga championship. With the arrival of new manager Michael Laudrup in summer 2002, Nordin moved back to Sweden. He played a further two years with AIK, before ending his career with Ekerö IK in 2005.

== International career ==
He played two matches for the Sweden U21 team in 1990, including at the 1990 UEFA European Under-21 Championship where Sweden reached the semi-finals.

== Honours ==
Djurgårdens IF

- Svenska Cupen: 1989–90

AIK

- Allsvenskan: 1992, 1998
- Svenska Cupen: 1995–96, 1996–97, 1998–99

Brøndby IF

- Danish Superliga: 2001–02

Individual

- Swedish Midfielder of the Year: 1999
- Brøndby IF Player of the Year: 2001
