= Martin P. Nilsson =

Swedish classical scholar (1874–1967)

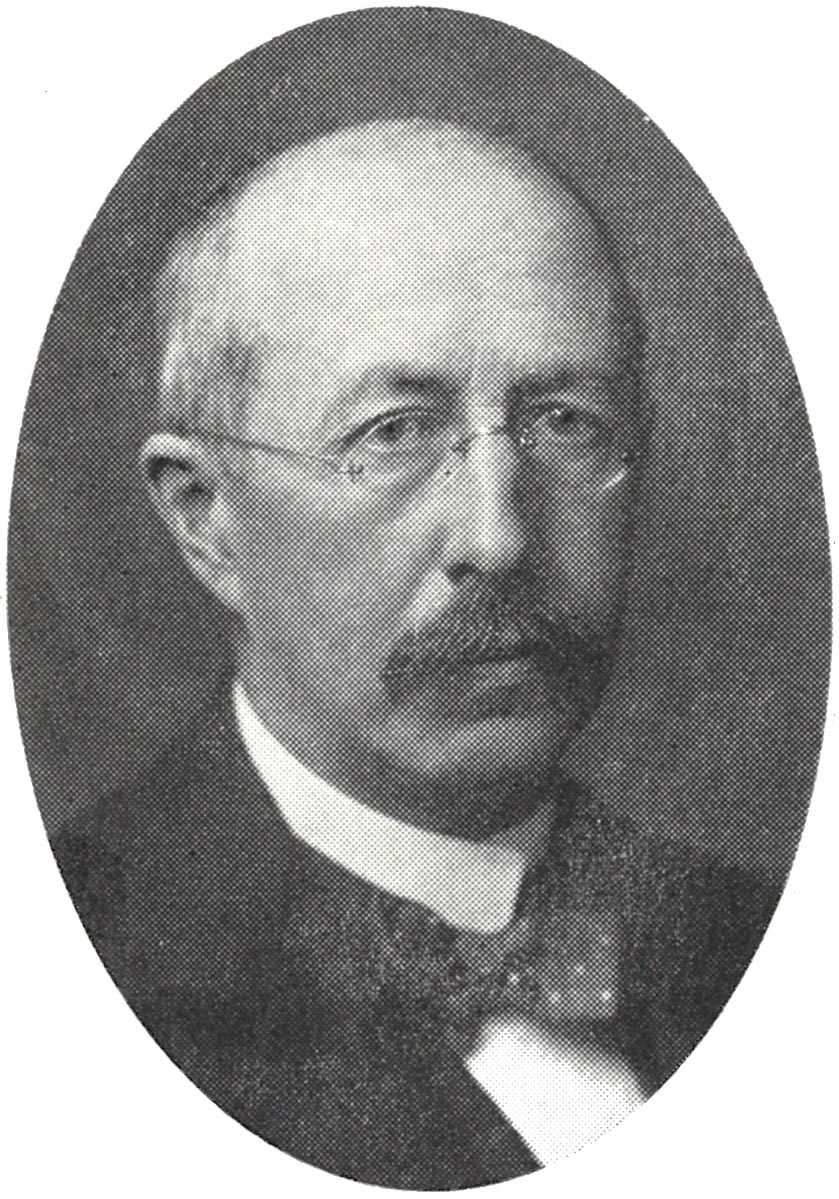
Portrait

Martin Persson Nilsson (Stoby, Kristianstad County, 12 July 1874 – Lund, 7 April 1967) was a Swedish philologist, mythographer, and a scholar of the Greek, Hellenistic and Roman religious systems. In his studies he combined literary evidence with archaeological evidence, linking historic and prehistoric evidence for the evolution of the Greek mythological cycles.

== Biography ==
Beginning in 1900 as a tutor at the University of Lund, he was appointed Secretary to the Swedish Archaeological Commission working in Rhodes, in 1905. In 1909 he was appointed Professor of Ancient Greek, Classical Archaeology and Ancient History at Lund. Later, Nilsson was Secretary of the Royal Society of Letters in Lund and an Associate of the Royal Swedish Academy of Letters, History and Antiquities, in Stockholm. In 1924 he was made a corresponding member of the Prussian Academy of Sciences. He was elected an International Member of the American Philosophical Society in 1939 and an International Honorary Member of the American Academy of Arts and Sciences.

== Works ==
Nilsson's best-known work in German is Geschichte der griechischen Religion (transl. History of Greek Religion) in the Handbuch der Altertumswissenschaft (transl. Handbook of Classical Antiquities), which went through several editions. Nilsson had previously published it in Swedish under the title Den grekiska religionens historia (1922). In English his Minoan-Mycenaean Religion, and Its Survival in Greek Religion is more often quoted. Other important works include:

- Primitive Time-Reckoning; A Study in the Origins and First Development of the Art of Counting Time Among the Primitive and Early Culture Peoples (Lund: C. W. K. Gleerup) 1920
- The Mycenaean Origin of Greek Mythology (Berkeley: University of California Press) 1932 (On-line text) This work had its origins in the Sather Classical Lectures
- Homer and Mycenae (London: Methuen) 1933
- Primitive Religion 1934
- "Early Orphism and Kindred Religious Movements" Harvard Theological Review 28 (1935):180-230
- The Age of the Early Greek Tyrants (Belfast) 1936 (The Dill Memorial Lecture)
- Greek Popular Religion (New York: Cat) 1940 (On-line text)
- Grekisk Religiositet (in Swedish). Stockholm: Hugo Gebers Förlag. 1946.
  - Translated as Greek Piety (Norton/Oxford University Press) 1969
  - Translated as Griechischer Glaube (in German). Bern: A. Francke Verlag. 1950.
- Greek Folk Religion. Reprinted with a foreword by Arthur Darby Nock, 1972
- Den Grekiska Religionens Historia [History of Greek Religion] (in Swedish). 1922.
  - Translated as "Geschichte der griechischen Religion". Handbuch der Altertumswissenschaft [Handbook of Classical Antiquities] (in German).
- Minoan-Mycenaean Religion, and Its Survival in Greek Religion (Lund: Gleerup); revised 2nd ed. 1950
- The Bacchic Mysteries in Italy
  - See also "The Bacchic Mysteries in the Roman Age" Harvard Theological Review 46 (1953):175-202
- Cults, Myths, Oracles, and Politics in Ancient Greece (Studies in Mediterranean Archeology)
- The Historical Hellenistic Background of the New Testament (The Bedell Lecture, Kenyon College)

== Sources ==
- "Martin P. Nilsson: In Memoriam" The Harvard Theological Review 60.4 (October 1967), p. 373.
