= Dick Lidman =

Swedish footballer

Personal information
- Full name: Dick Gunnar Lidman
- Date of birth: 24 January 1967 (age 59)
- Place of birth: Skellefteå, Sweden
- Height: 1.86 m (6 ft 1 in)
- Position: Midfielder

Senior career*
Years	Team	Apps	(Gls)
1985–1989	Skellefteå AIK	77	(18)
1989–1992	GIF Sundsvall	63	(35)
1992–1995	AIK	172	(22)
1995–1996	Slavia Prague	3	(1)
1996–1997	AIK	23	(4)
Total		338	(80)

International career^{‡}
1995	Sweden	2	(0)
- * Club domestic league appearances and goals as of 26 October 2017 (UTC) ‡ National team caps and goals as of 26 October (UTC)

Dick Gunnar Lidman (born 24 January 1967) is a Swedish former footballer who played as a midfielder. During his club career, Lidman played for Skellefteå AIK, GIF Sundsvall, AIK, and Slavia Prague. He made two appearances for the Sweden national team in 1995.

== Honours ==
AIK

- Swedish Champion: 1992
- Svenska Cupen: 1995-96, 1996-97

Slavia Prague

- Czech First League: 1995–96
