= Hans Eklund =

Swedish footballer and manager (born 1969)

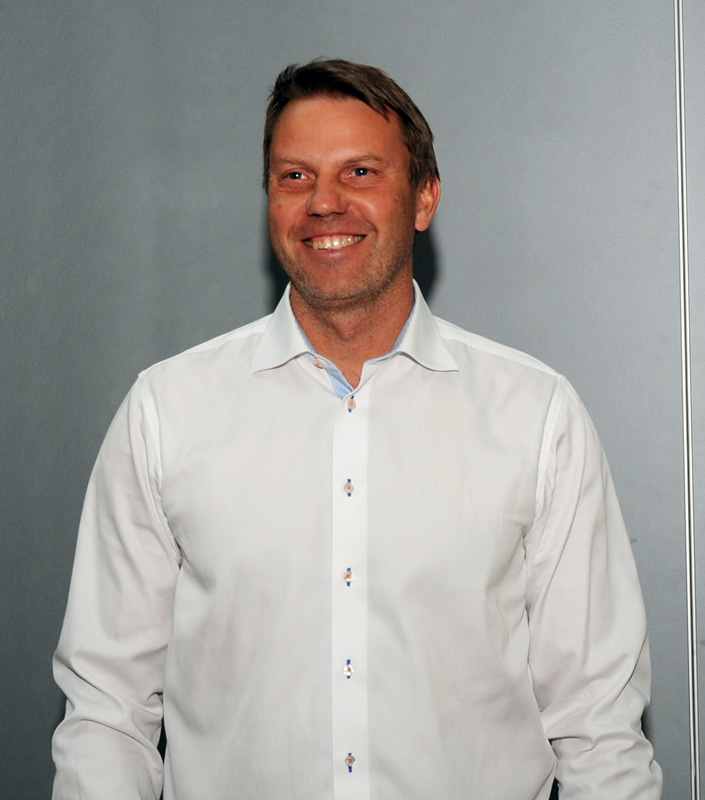
- Hans Eklund in March 2015

Personal information
- Full name: Hans Patrik Eklund
- Date of birth: 16 April 1969 (age 57)
- Place of birth: Mönsterås, Sweden
- Height: 1.81 m (5 ft 11 in)
- Position: Forward

Senior career*
Years	Team	Apps	(Gls)
1984–1986	Mönsterås GIF	43	(14)
1987–1997	Östers IF	259	(115)
1994–1995	Servette Genève	7	(1)
1998	Dalian Wanda	26	(8)
1998–2000	Viborg FF	50	(21)
2000–2003	Helsingborgs IF	79	(23)
Total		464	(182)

International career
1985	Sweden U17	9	(4)
1986	Sweden U19	4	(3)
1987–1990	Sweden U21	20	(8)
1988–1994	Sweden	7	(0)

Managerial career
- 2006: Helsingborgs IF (caretaker)
- 2007–2009: Viborg FF
- 2013: Falkenbergs FF
- 2014: Kalmar FF
- 2015–2021: Falkenbergs FF
- * Club domestic league appearances and goals

Hans Patrik Eklund (born 16 April 1969) is a Swedish football manager, and former football player. In his active career, Eklund played seven games for the Sweden men's national football team and was the 1992 Allsvenskan top scorer.

== Club career ==
Eklund started his career at Mönsterås GIF. In 1987, he moved to Östers IF. With 16 goals in the 1992 Allsvenskan season, he was the league top goal-scorer. He stayed at Östers until 1997, when he moved abroad to play for Servette FC in Switzerland. He moved on to Chinese club Dalian Wanda, before playing for Viborg FF in Denmark. Eklund secured Viborg their first nationwide title, when he scored the only goal as Viborg beat Aalborg BK 1–0 in the 2000 Danish Cup final. He returned to Sweden, to play for Helsingborgs IF. Eklund ended his career in 2003.

== International career ==
Eklund represented the Sweden U17, U19, and U21 teams a combined total of 33 times, scoring 15 goals. He made his full international debut for Sweden on 12 January 1988, in a friendly 4–1 win against East Germany when he replaced Leif Engqvist in the 71st minute. He made his first and only competitive appearance for Sweden on 19 May 1993 in a 1994 FIFA World Cup qualifier against Austria, replacing Martin Dahlin in the 86th minute of a 1–0 win. He won his seventh and final cap on 24 February 1994 in a friendly game against Mexico, playing for 87 minutes before being replaced by Anders Andersson in a 1–2 loss.

== Managerial career ==
As he ended his active career, Eklund was hired as youth team coach at Helsingborgs IF. He was later promoted to assistant coach for the team. In November 2007, he was hired as manager of his former team Viborg FF. He was fired in April 2009 due to mixed results. In December 2009 it was announced that he would join Landskrona BoIS, working as an assistant manager.

== Career statistics ==
=== International ===
Appearances and goals by national team and year

National team	Year	Apps	Goals
Sweden	1988	2	0
Sweden	1989	0	0
Sweden	1990	2	0
Sweden	1991	0	0
Sweden	1992	1	0
Sweden	1993	1	0
Sweden	1994	1	0
Total		7	0

== Honours ==
=== Player ===
Viborg FF

- Danish Cup: 1999–2000

=== Manager ===
Falkenbergs FF

- Superettan: 2013

== Sources ==
- Hans Eklund at National-Football-Teams.com
- (in Swedish)
- Hans Eklund at the Swedish Football Association (in Swedish)
