= Ola Andersson =

Swedish footballer (born 1966)

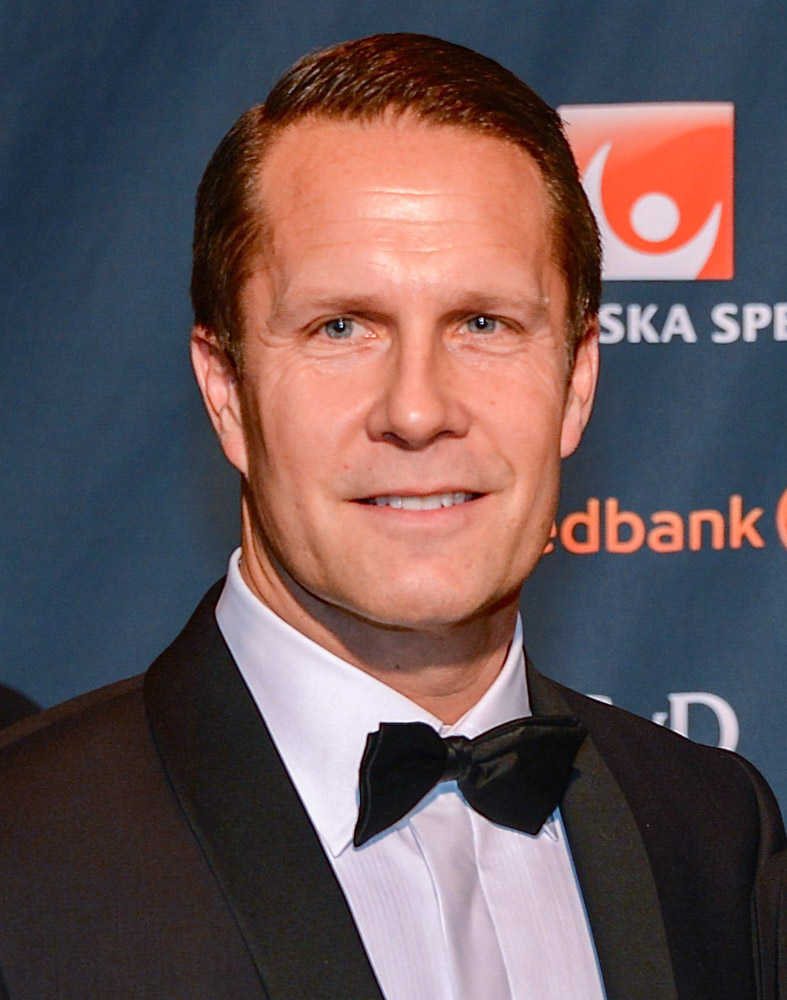
- Andersson in 2013
- Born: 1 July 1966 (age 60); Åkersberga, Sweden
- Occupations: Footballer, Commentator for SVT and Canal Plus
Association football career
- Full name: Ola Per Andersson
- Height: 1.74 m (5 ft 9 in)
- Position: Midfielder
Senior career*
Years	Team	Apps	(Gls)
1985–1986	Bälinge IF		
1987–1989	IF Brommapojkarna	61	(7)
1990–1994	IK Sirius	116	(23)
1995–2000	AIK	102	(2)
2001	Vasalunds IF	10	(1)
2001	IK Sirius		
International career
1995	Sweden	2	(0)
- * Club domestic league appearances and goals

Ola Per Andersson (born 1 July 1966) is a Swedish former professional footballer who played as a midfielder. He is the current director of football at IK Sirius. He also works as a football expert on television.

== Club career ==
A midfielder, Andersson grew up in Uppsala and played for Bälinge IF, before being bought by IF Brommapojkarna in 1987 he played for the team until 1989. He started to play for IK Sirius in Division 1 Norra until 1994. He then was bought by the Allsvenskan team AIK. With AIK Andersson won Allsvenskan in 1998 and three gold and two silver models at Svenska Cupen.

== International career ==
In 1995, while a player for AIK, Andersson was selected by the Sweden national team and played two matches in Umbro Cup in England. On 8 June 1995, he made his full international debut for the Sweden national team against England, replacing Magnus Erlingmark in the 89th minute of a 3-3 draw. Two days later, on 10 June 1995, Andersson played for 90 minutes against Japan in a game that ended 2-2. He provided an assist for Kennet Andersson's 1-1 equaliser in the 53rd minute.

== After football ==
After Andersson's football career was over he became an expert commentator for Canal Plus football broadcasts. He commentated the Fifa World Cup 2002 for SVT.

He's had several roles in IK Sirius after his playing career. He was sporting director of the club between 2018 and 2023.

== Career statistics ==
=== International ===
Appearances and goals by national team and year
National team	Year	Apps	Goals
Sweden	1995	2	0
Total		2	0

== Honours ==
AIK

- Allsvenskan: 1998
- Svenska Cupen: 1995–96, 1996–97, 1998–99
