= Isak Bjerkebo =

Swedish footballer

Personal information
- Full name: Kenneth Viktor Isak Bjerkebo
- Date of birth: 19 January 2003 (age 23)
- Place of birth: Stoby, Sweden
- Height: 1.78 m (5 ft 10 in)
- Position: Forward

Team information
- Current team: IK Sirius
- Number: 11

Youth career
- 2008–2016: Hässleholms IF
- 2016–2022: Malmö FF

Senior career*
Years	Team	Apps	(Gls)
2022–2023	Kalmar FF	12	(1)
2023	→ Skövde AIK (loan)	18	(5)
2024	Varbergs BoIS	30	(11)
2025–	IK Sirius	53	(21)

International career^{‡}
2019	Sweden U16	7	(1)
- * Club domestic league appearances and goals as of 18 October 2026 ‡ National team caps and goals as of 11 May 2025

Kenneth Viktor Isak Bjerkebo (born 19 January 2003) is a Swedish professional footballer who plays as a forward for Allsvenskan club IK Sirius.

== Club career ==
Bjerkebo hails from Stoby, outside Hässleholm, and started his youth career with Hässleholms IF in 2008. When he was 12, he scored 4 goals in a 6–4 win vs. Malmö FF, and was subsequently invited to play with Malmö FF for several youth tournaments. Bjerkebo then joined Malmö FF at the age of 13, also enrolling at the Malmö Sports Elementary School, successively playing for the club's U15, U17 and U19 teams. In 2021, he played and scored 4 goals in the 2021–22 UEFA Youth League group stage, the last one on away ground against Juventus.

In the summer of 2022, Bjerkebo started his senior career when Allsvenskan team Kalmar FF managed to sign him. He made his Allsvenskan debut on 17 July 2022 away from home against AIK. Despite scoring his first Allsvenskan goal a month later on 14 August 2022 against Djurgården, he did not become a regular in Kalmar's team. As playing time waned significantly in 2023, Bjerkebo was loaned to Superettan team Skövde AIK in the summer. He moved permanently to Superettan team Varbergs BoIS in 2024, taking the same path as former Skövde manager Tobias Linderoth. The 2024 Superettan campaign became successful for Bjerkebo as he scored 11 league goals.

After starting the 2025 season playing for Varberg in the 2024–25 Svenska Cupen in February and March, he was picked up by IK Sirius, thus returning to Allsvenskan. In the 2025–26 Svenska Cupen, Bjerkebo was noted for scoring the winning goal in the quarter-final against IFK Göteborg. He continued his fine form in 2026 Allsvenskan, scoring 8 goals in the first 7 games, as Sirius topped the league.

== International career ==
For Sweden's youth national teams, Bjerkebo was selected for Sweden U16 in 2019. He appeared in 7 matches and scored 1 goal.

== Career statistics ==
As of match played 18 October 2026

Club	Season	League			National Cup (Note: Includes Svenska Cupen)		Other		Total	
Club	Season	Division	Apps	Goals	Apps	Goals	Apps	Goals	Apps	Goals
Kalmar FF	2022	Allsvenskan	10	1	1	2	—		11	3
Kalmar FF	2023	Allsvenskan	2	0	3	1	—		5	1
Kalmar FF	Total		12	1	4	3	0	0	16	4
Skövde AIK (loan)	2023	Superettan	18	5	0	0	2 (Note: Appearances in Superettan play-off)	0	20	5
Varbergs BoIS	2024	Superettan	30	11	4	2	—		34	13
Varbergs BoIS	2025	Superettan	—		3	0	—		3	0
Varbergs BoIS	Total		30	11	7	2	0	0	37	13
IK Sirius	2025	Allsvenskan	29	7	0	0	—		29	7
IK Sirius	2026	Allsvenskan	24	14	5	2	—		29	16
IK Sirius	Total		53	21	5	2	0	0	58	23
Career total			113	38	16	7	2	0	131	45
