= 1992 Allsvenskan =

68th season of Allsvenskan

Allsvenskan
- Season: 1992 AIK (Swedish champions after winning Mästerskapsserien)
- Relegated: Djurgårdens IF (via Kvalsvenskan); GAIS (via Kvalsvenskan)
- Champions League: IFK Göteborg
- UEFA Cup: IFK Norrköping; Östers IF
- Top goalscorer: Hans Eklund, Östers IF (16)
- Average attendance: 4,194

Allsvenskan 1992, part of the 1992 Swedish football season, was the 68th Allsvenskan season played. IFK Norrköping won the league ahead of runners-up Östers IF, and advanced to Mästerskapsserien 1992 along with the teams placed 3 to 6, while the teams placed 7 to 10 advanced to Kvalsvenskan 1992.

== Spring 1992 ==
=== League table ===
Pos	Team	Pld	W	D	L	GF	GA	GD	Pts	Qualification
1	IFK Norrköping (C)	18	11	3	4	38	19	+19	36	Qualification to Mästerskapsserien
2	Östers IF	18	8	5	5	36	29	+7	29	Qualification to Mästerskapsserien
3	Trelleborgs FF	18	7	7	4	20	20	0	28	Qualification to Mästerskapsserien
4	AIK	18	7	6	5	24	18	+6	27	Qualification to Mästerskapsserien
5	Malmö FF	18	7	5	6	22	16	+6	26	Qualification to Mästerskapsserien
6	IFK Göteborg	18	7	2	9	25	24	+1	23	Qualification to Mästerskapsserien
7	Djurgårdens IF (R)	18	6	5	7	26	32	−6	23	Qualification to Kvalsvenskan
8	Örebro SK	18	4	8	6	17	23	−6	20	Qualification to Kvalsvenskan
9	Västra Frölunda	18	4	5	9	18	27	−9	17	Qualification to Kvalsvenskan
10	GAIS (R)	18	4	4	10	14	32	−18	16	Qualification to Kvalsvenskan

Rules for classification: 1) points; 2) goal difference; 3) number of goals scored.
(C) Allsvenskan Champion; (R) Relegated

=== Results ===
Home \ Away	AIK	DIF	GAIS	IFKG	IFKN	MFF	TFF	VF	ÖSK	ÖIF
AIK		4–4	0–0	3–0	0–1	3–1	0–1	2–0	0–1	3–0
Djurgårdens IF	1–1		4–0	1–0	2–2	1–0	1–2	3–2	1–0	2–1
GAIS	0–1	2–1		3–0	0–3	0–1	0–1	1–1	0–0	2–2
IFK Göteborg	0–1	6–1	2–1		1–2	3–0	1–0	2–0	3–1	0–1
IFK Norrköping	3–1	3–1	1–2	4–1		1–0	2–2	4–0	3–0	6–2
Malmö FF	2–0	1–1	0–1	1–0	4–0		1–1	1–0	4–0	2–2
Trelleborgs FF	2–2	0–0	1–0	2–2	0–2	1–0		1–0	1–3	3–2
Västra Frölunda	1–2	3–1	3–2	1–0	2–1	0–0	1–1		1–1	2–3
Örebro SK	0–0	3–1	2–0	0–2	0–0	2–2	1–1	0–0		2–3
Östers IF	1–1	2–0	9–0	2–2	1–0	0–2	2–0	2–1	1–1	

Legend: Blue = home team win; Yellow = draw; Red = away team win.

== Autumn 1992 ==
=== Mästerskapsserien 1992 ===
Pos	Team	Pld	W	D	L	GF	GA	GD	Pts	Qualification or relegation
1	AIK (S)	10	6	2	2	23	11	+12	34	Qualification to Champions League first round
2	IFK Norrköping	10	4	2	4	14	18	−4	32	Qualification to UEFA Cup first round
3	Östers IF	10	4	3	3	18	17	+1	30	Qualification to UEFA Cup first round
4	Trelleborgs FF	10	4	0	6	23	29	−6	26	
5	IFK Göteborg	10	4	1	5	17	17	0	25	
6	Malmö FF	10	3	2	5	11	14	−3	24	

Rules for classification: 1) points; 2) goal difference; 3) number of goals scored.
The teams brought half the points collected in Allsvenskan to Mästerskapsserien. In case of an odd number of points collected, the resulting half point was rounded up.
(S) Swedish Champion

==== Results ====
Home \ Away	AIK	IFKG	IFKN	MFF	TFF	ÖIF
AIK		4–2	2–2	1–0	4–0	1–1
IFK Göteborg	2–0		1–3	2–0	1–3	3–1
IFK Norrköping	2–1	1–0		0–0	3–2	0–1
Malmö FF	2–3	2–1	3–1		0–1	1–3
Trelleborgs FF	0–5	2–4	6–2	1–2		7–2
Östers IF	0–2	1–1	2–0	1–1	6–1	

Legend: Blue = home team win; Yellow = draw; Red = away team win.

=== Kvalsvenskan 1992 ===
Pos	Team	Pld	W	D	L	GF	GA	GD	Pts	Qualification or relegation
1	Halmstads BK	14	9	1	4	31	20	+11	28	Promotion to Allsvenskan
2	Örebro SK	14	8	2	4	28	16	+12	26	Promotion to Allsvenskan
3	IK Brage	14	7	5	2	21	11	+10	26	Promotion to Allsvenskan
4	BK Häcken	14	7	2	5	29	24	+5	23	Promotion to Allsvenskan
5	Djurgårdens IF	14	5	7	2	30	16	+14	22	Qualification to Relegation play-offs
6	GAIS	14	5	2	7	18	21	−3	17	Qualification to Relegation play-offs
7	Västra Frölunda	14	1	4	9	19	31	−12	7	Qualification to Relegation play-offs
8	IFK Sundsvall	14	2	1	11	12	49	−37	7	Qualification to Relegation play-offs

Rules for classification: 1) points; 2) goal difference; 3) number of goals scored.

=== Allsvenskan qualification play-offs 1992 ===
1st round

Pos	Team	Pld	W	D	L	GF	GA	GD	Pts
1	Helsingborgs IF	3	1	2	0	7	6	+1	5
2	IFK Luleå	3	1	1	1	5	5	0	4
3	Örgryte IS	3	0	3	0	1	1	0	3
4	Degerfors IF	3	0	2	1	3	4	−1	2

Rules for classification: 1) points; 2) goal difference; 3) number of goals scored.

2nd round

November 1, 1992

Djurgårdens IF	3–1	Degerfors IF

Stockholms stadion, Stockholm
November 7, 1992

Degerfors IF	(ag) 2–0	Djurgårdens IF

Stora Valla, Degerfors

October 31, 1992

GAIS	1–2	Örgryte IS

Gothenburg
November 7, 1992

Örgryte IS	2–0	GAIS

Gothenburg

October 31, 1992

IFK Luleå	2–1	Västra Frölunda IF

Luleå
November 7, 1992

Västra Frölunda IF	4–2	IFK Luleå

Gothenburg

October 31, 1992

Helsingborgs IF	3–0	IFK Sundsvall

Helsingborg
November 7, 1992

IFK Sundsvall	1–6	Helsingborgs IF

Sundsvall

== Season statistics ==
=== Top scorers ===
Rank	Player	Club	Goals
1	(Sweden) Hans Eklund	Östers IF	16
2	(Ukraine) Vadym Yevtushenko	AIK	14
3	(Sweden) Johnny Ekström	IFK Göteborg	13
3	(Sweden) Mats Lilienberg	IFK Göteborg	13
5	(Sweden) Jan Hellström	IFK Norrköping	11
6	(Sweden) Stefan Rehn	IFK Göteborg	9
6	(Sweden) Krister Nordin	AIK	9
6	(Sweden) Peter Hillgren	Trelleborgs FF	9
9	(Sweden) Patrik Andersson	IFK Norrköping	8
9	(Sweden) Pascal Simpson	AIK	8
9	(Sweden) Jan Jansson	Östers IF	8

== Attendances ==
#	Club	Average	Highest
1	IFK Göteborg	6,197	12,602
2	AIK	5,216	13,188
3	IFK Norrköping	4,844	6,959
4	Malmö FF	4,302	12,132
5	Djurgårdens IF	4,169	15,012
6	Örebro SK	4,128	6,256
7	Trelleborgs FF	3,740	7,815
8	GAIS	2,961	6,538
9	Östers IF	2,864	4,349
10	Västra Frölunda IF	1,473	4,665
