= Pär Millqvist =

Swedish association football player

Personal information
- Full name: Pär Johan Millqvist
- Date of birth: 24 May 1967 (age 59)
- Place of birth: Solna, Sweden
- Position: Right-back

Youth career
- 1974–1981: Råsunda IS
- 1982–1985: Djurgårdens IF

Senior career*
Years	Team	Apps	(Gls)
1986	Djurgårdens IF	8	(0)
1987–1988	IFK Göteborg	7	(2)
1989–1993	Örebro SK	53	(2)
1994–1995	Vasalunds IF	50	(4)
1996–1998	AIK	58	(0)
1999	IF Brommapojkarna	16	(0)
Total		192	(8)

International career
1986–1987	Sweden U21	2	(0)
- * Club domestic league appearances and goals

Pär Johan Millqvist (born 24 May 1967) is a Swedish former footballer who played as a right-back.

== Club career ==
Millqvist represented Djurgårdens IF, IFK Göteborg, Örebro SK, Vasalunds IF, AIK, and IF Brommapojkarna during a career that spanned between 1986 and 1999. While at IFK Göteborg, he was a part of the Göteborg team that was crowned Swedish Champions in 1987.

He is best remembered for his time at AIK, with which he won one Allsvenskan title and two Svenska Cupen titles. He was also a part of the AIK team that reached the quarterfinals of the 1996–97 UEFA Cup Winners' Cup before being eliminated by FC Barcelona.

== International career ==
Millqvist represented the Sweden U21 team twice between 1986 and 1987.

== Honours ==
IFK Göteborg

- Swedish Champion: 1987

AIK

- Allsvenskan: 1998
- Svenska Cupen: 1995–96, 1996–97
