= Otso Liimatta =

Finnish footballer (born 2004)

Personal information
- Full name: Otso Urho Eemil Liimatta
- Date of birth: 10 July 2004 (age 22)
- Place of birth: Oulu, Finland
- Height: 1.69 m (5 ft 7 in)
- Position: Midfielder

Team information
- Current team: Sirius

Youth career
- 2008–2020: Tervarit

Senior career*
Years	Team	Apps	(Gls)
2020–2023	AC Oulu	53	(9)
2020–2021	→ OLS (loan)	18	(3)
2023–2026	Famalicão	17	(0)
2025	→ IFK Värnamo (loan)	13	(3)
2026	→ Halmstad (loan)	9	(2)
2026–	Sirius	2	(2)

International career^{‡}
2019	Finland U15	2	(0)
2019	Finland U16	2	(1)
2021–2022	Finland U18	6	(1)
2022	Finland U19	6	(1)
2023–	Finland U21	29	(8)
Medal record
AC Oulu
First place	Ykkönen	2020
Second place	Finnish League Cup	2023
- * Club domestic league appearances and goals as of 15 August 2026 ‡ National team caps and goals as of 31 March 2026

Otso Urho Eemil Liimatta (born 10 July 2004) is a Finnish professional footballer who plays as a midfielder for Allsvenskan club Sirius, and the Finland under-21 national team.

== Club career ==
=== AC Oulu ===
Born in Oulu and raised in Karjasilta, Liimatta played in the youth sector of Tervarit before signing his first professional contract with AC Oulu in September 2020.

He made his Veikkausliiga debut on 28 May 2021, aged 16, in a 3–1 away loss to HJK: in the process, he assisted his side's only goal. During 2021, Liimatta played for the club's reserve team Oulun Luistinseura (OLS) in third-tier Kakkonen, and additionally made nine appearances in Veikkausliiga with the first team.

Liimatta scored his first goal in the league on 29 April 2022, the opener in a 3–0 home win against Haka. In the summer of 2022, various Finnish media outlets reported that Liimatta had attracted interest by several high-profile European clubs. At the end of the 2022 season, Liimatta was named the Best Young Player of the Year at the Captain's Ball awards held by the Finnish FA.

=== F.C. Famalicão ===
On 29 July 2023, Liimatta officially joined Primeira Liga side Famalicão for an undisclosed fee, signing a four-year deal with the Portuguese club. According to the media, the fee was in six figures and is believed to be close to €600,000. He made his debut for the Fama on 11 August 2023, starting in the opening league game of the season against Braga, which ended in a 2–1 win for his team.

==== IFK Värnamo (loan) ====
On 26 July 2025, he was loaned out to Allsvenskan club IFK Värnamo. On 2 August, in his second match for Värnamo, Liimatta scored his first Allsvenskan goal as a substitute, in a 2–2 home draw against GAIS.

==== Halmstads BK (loan) ====
On 5 March 2026, he was loaned out to Allsvenskan club Halmstads BK.

=== IK Sirius ===
On 7 August 2026 Liimatta joined Allsvenskan club Sirius on a contract running to 2031.

== International career ==
=== Youth ===
Liimatta has represented Finland at various youth levels.

On 7 March 2023, at the age of 18, he got his first call-up to the Finland under-21 national team for two friendly matches against North Macedonia and Bulgaria. He scored his first U21 goal in the latter match, on 28 March 2023, taking part in a 0–2 win over Bulgaria.

Liimatta scored a hat-trick against Albania U21 on 13 October 2023 in a 2025 UEFA U21 Euro qualifying match, which ended in 4–1 victory for Finland. Liimatta finished the qualification campaign scoring seven goals, making him the joint-second-best goalscorer of the whole qualification, and helped Finland to qualify for the final tournament, for the second time in the nation's history.

== Career statistics ==
As of 15 August 2026

Appearances and goals by club, season and competition
Club	Season	League			National cup (Note: Includes Suomen Cup, Taça de Portugal and Svenska Cupen)		League cup (Note: Includes Kakkonen Cup and Finnish League Cup)		Europe		Total	
Club	Season	Division	Apps	Goals	Apps	Goals	Apps	Goals	Apps	Goals	Apps	Goals
OLS	2020	Kakkonen	1	0	—		2	2	—		3	2
OLS	2021	Kakkonen	17	3	—		—		—		17	3
OLS	Total		18	3	0	0	2	2	0	0	20	5
AC Oulu	2021	Veikkausliiga	9	0	0	0	—		—		9	0
AC Oulu	2022	Veikkausliiga	28	5	3	1	0	0	—		31	6
AC Oulu	2023	Veikkausliiga	16	4	3	3	7	1	—		26	8
AC Oulu	Total		53	9	6	4	7	1	0	0	66	14
Famalicão	2023–24	Primeira Liga	12	0	1	0	0	0	—		13	0
Famalicão	2024–25	Primeira Liga	5	0	1	0	0	0	—		6	0
Famalicão	Total		17	0	2	0	0	0	0	0	19	0
IFK Värnamo (loan)	2025	Allsvenskan	13	3	1	0	—		—		14	3
Halmstad (loan)	2026	Allsvenskan	9	2	1	0	—		—		10	2
Sirius	2026	Allsvenskan	2	2	0	0	—		—		2	2
Career total			112	19	10	4	9	3	0	0	131	26

== Honours ==
AC Oulu

- Finnish League Cup runner-up: 2023

Individual

- Veikkausliiga Team of the Year: 2022
- Finnish FA: Best Young Player of the Year 2022
- Finnish FA: U21 Player of the Year 2023
- Finnish FA, Northern Finland: Player of the Year 2022, 2023
