= Patrik Olsson =

Swedish footballer

Personal information
- Full name: Patrik Olsson
- Date of birth: 27 September 1974 (age 52)
- Place of birth: Landskrona, Sweden
- Position: Forward

Youth career
- Asmundstorps IF

Senior career*
Years	Team	Apps	(Gls)
1993–1997	Malmö FF	64	(4)
1998–2000	Trelleborgs FF		
- Bunkeflo IF
- * Club domestic league appearances and goals

Patrik Olsson (born 27 September 1974) is a Swedish former footballer who played as a forward.
