= Tobias Anker =

Danish footballer (born 2001)

Personal information
- Full name: Tobias Pajbjerg Anker
- Date of birth: 6 March 2001 (age 25)
- Place of birth: Herning, Denmark
- Height: 1.94 m (6 ft 4 in)
- Position: Centre-back

Team information
- Current team: Sirius
- Number: 4

Youth career
- –2020: Midtjylland

Senior career*
Years	Team	Apps	(Gls)
2020–2022	Midtjylland	0	(0)
2020–2022	→ Fredericia (loan)	31	(1)
2022–2023	Vendsyssel	31	(6)
2023–2024	AGF	14	(2)
2025–	Sirius	37	(3)

International career
2017–2018	Denmark U17	5	(0)
2019–2020	Denmark U19	7	(0)
- * Club domestic league appearances and goals as of 8 July 2026

Tobias Pajbjerg Anker (born 6 March 2001) is a Danish footballer who currently plays as a centre-back for IK Sirius in Allsvenskan.

== Career ==
He was born in Herning. Coming up through the academy of FC Midtjylland, he started his senior career as a loanee in FC Fredericia.

Between 2017 and 2020, he was capped 12 times for Denmark U17 and Denmark U19. He was a squad member of the 2018 UEFA European Under-17 Championship.

Anker was never given a chance in FC Midtjylland, and was sold to Vendsyssel in June 2022. In his first half year at the club, Anker was named as the club's best player. At the end of the 2022–23 Danish 1st Division, he again received that honor.

Towards the end of the summer 2023 transfer window, Anker was bought by Aarhus Gymnastikforening (AGF), who had recently sold Yann Bisseck. In December 2024, Anker was announced as a new signing for IK Sirius in Sweden, effective on 1 January. The possibility for regular play in AGF just was not high enough. AGF was said to recoup the transfer fee of 2.5 million kr. as Siris paid the same amount for the purchase of Anker.

Anker scored his first league goal for Sirius in August 2025. He then scored in the last match of the season as well, against already-relegated Värnamo.

== Personal life ==
While living in Sweden, Anker lost an appeal for partial tax exemption through a technicality.
