= Patrik Fredholm =

Swedish footballer

Personal information
- Full name: Patrik Ivar Fredholm
- Date of birth: 10 May 1978 (age 48)
- Place of birth: Stockholm, Sweden
- Height: 1.88 m (6 ft 2 in)
- Position: Midfielder

Senior career*
Years	Team	Apps	(Gls)
1996–1998	AIK		
1999	Udinese		
1999–2000	De Graafschap		
2000	Castel di Sangro		
2001–2003	Örgryte IS		
2004	Kvik Halden		
2005–2006	Haugesund		
- * Club domestic league appearances and goals

Patrik Fredholm (born 10 May 1978) is a Swedish retired football midfielder.
