= Samuel Adindu =

Nigerian footballer

Personal information
- Full name: Odera Samuel Onuchukwu Adindu
- Date of birth: 4 June 2006 (age 20)
- Place of birth: Nigeria
- Position: Forward

Team information
- Current team: IK Sirius
- Number: 25

Youth career
- –2024: Future Pro

Senior career*
Years	Team	Apps	(Gls)
2025	Future Pro	0	(0)
2025	→ HTFF (loan)	15	(9)
2025	Hammarby IF	0	(0)
2025	→ HTFF	15	(5)
2026–	IK Sirius	16	(1)
- * Club domestic league appearances and goals as of 1 September 2026

Odera Samuel Onuchukwu Adindu (born 4 June 2006) is a Nigerian professional footballer who plays as a forward for Allsvenskan club IK Sirius.

== Club career ==
In his first season in Sweden, Adindu scored 15 goals and contributed with 4 assists as HTFF narrowly missed out on promotion to Superettan.

For the 2026 season, Adindu signed with IK Sirius on a contract until the end of 2030 for a reported fee of 5 million SEK. He scored three minutes into his unofficial debut in a 2–1 friendly win vs. Degerfors IF on 24 January 2026. On 4 April 2026, he made his Allsvenskan debut as a substitute in yet another win vs. Degerfors IF, with the game finishing 3–0.
