= Marco Ciardi =

Swedish retired footballer

Personal information
- Full name: Marco Alberto Ciardi
- Date of birth: 25 July 1969 (age 57)
- Place of birth: Sweden
- Position: Midfielder

Senior career*
Years	Team	Apps	(Gls)
199x–1988	Vasalunds IF		
1989–1990	AIK Fotboll	26	(0)
1991–1995	Vasalunds IF		
1995–1996	AIK Fotboll	47	(2)
1996–1997	Vitória S.C.	3	(0)
1997	Ayr United F.C.	8	(0)
1998	Västerås SK Fotboll	12	(3)
- * Club domestic league appearances and goals

Marco Alberto Ciardi (born 25 July 1969) is a Swedish retired footballer who is last known to have played for Västerås SK Fotboll in his home country.

== Early life and career ==
Ciardi was born to a Finnish mother and an Italian father. He started his senior career with Vasalunds IF. In 1997, he signed for Ayr United in the Scottish Championship, where he made eight appearances and scored zero goals. After that, he played for Swedish club Västerås SK Fotboll before retiring in 1998.
