= Shu Kamo =

Japanese footballer and manager

Shu Kamo 加茂 周
Personal information
- Full name: Shu Kamo
- Date of birth: October 29, 1939 (age 87)
- Place of birth: Ashiya, Hyogo, Empire of Japan
- Height: 1.78 m (5 ft 10 in)
- Position: Forward

Youth career
- 1957–1959: Ashiya High School

College career
Years	Team	Apps	(Gls)
1960–1963	Kwansei Gakuin University		

Senior career*
Years	Team	Apps	(Gls)
1964–1967	Yanmar Diesel	14	(1)
Total		14	(1)

Managerial career
- 1974–1984: Nissan Motors
- 1985–1989: Nissan Motors
- 1991–1994: Yokohama Flügels
- 1994–1997: Japan
- 1999–2000: Kyoto Purple Sanga
- * Club domestic league appearances and goals

Shu Kamo (加茂 周, Kamo Shu; born October 29, 1939) is a former Japanese football player and manager. He managed the Japan national team.

== Playing career ==
Kamo was born in Ashiya on October 29, 1939. After graduation from Kwansei Gakuin University, he played for Yanmar Diesel from 1965 to 1967.

== Coaching career ==
In 1974, Kamo became manager for Nissan Motors. In 1991, he became manager for All Nippon Airways (later, Yokohama Flügels) and won the 1993 Emperor's Cup. In December 1994, he was named the Japan national team manager, replacing Paulo Roberto Falcão. After four games at the 1998 World Cup qualification Final round in October 1997, he was dismissed and assistant coach Takeshi Okada was promoted to manager.

1998 FIFA World Cup qualification Final round
#	Date	Venue	Opponent	Result
1	September 7	Tokyo, Japan	Uzbekistan	6–3
2	September 19	Abu Dhabi, UAE	United Arab Emirates	0–0
3	September 28	Tokyo, Japan	South Korea	1–2
4	October 4	Almaty, Kazakhstan	Kazakhstan	1–1

In 1999, Kamo became manager for Kyoto Purple Sanga until June 2000. Starting in 2001, he managed a number of universities such as Shobi University, Osaka Gakuin University, and his alma mater Kwansei Gakuin University. In 2017, he was selected for the Japan Football Hall of Fame.

== Managerial statistics ==
As of match played 27 May 2000

Managerial record by team and tenure
Team	Nat	From	To	Record				
Team	Nat	From	To	G	W	D	L	Win %
Yokohama Flugels	(Japan)	1 July 1991	30 November 1994	107	47	3	57	43.93
Japan	(Japan)	1 December 1994	4 October 1997	35	20	6	9	57.14
Kyoto Purple Sanga	(Japan)	1 July 1999	31 May 2000	30	9	1	20	30.00
Career Total				172	76	10	86	44.19

== Honours ==
- Japan Football Hall of Fame: Inducted in 2017
