= Stoby =

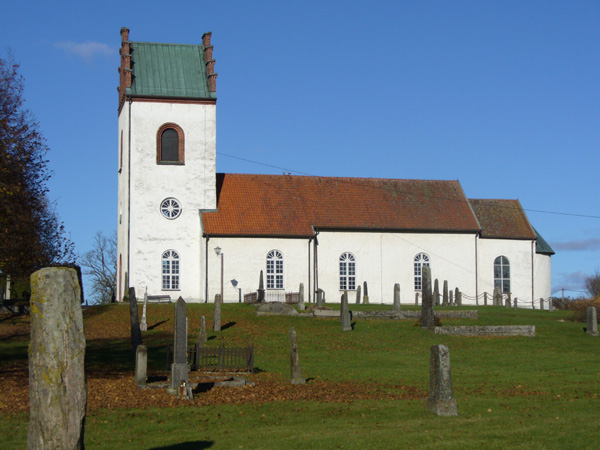
- Stoby Church

- Location within Scania Location within Sweden Location within European Union
- Coordinates: 56°11′N 13°49′E
- Country: Sweden
- Province: Scania
- County: Scania County
- Municipality: Hässleholm Municipality

Area
  - Total: 0.69 km^{2} (0.27 sq mi)

Population (31 December 2010)
  - Total: 745
  - Density: 1,080/km^{2} (2,800/sq mi)
- Time zone: UTC+1 (CET)
  - Summer (DST): UTC+2 (CEST)

Stoby is a locality situated in Hässleholm Municipality, Scania County, Sweden with 745 inhabitants in 2010.
