= Marcus Lindberg (footballer, born 2000) =

Danish footballer (born 2000)

Personal information
- Full name: Marcus Pheiffer Lindberg
- Date of birth: 27 June 2000 (age 26)
- Place of birth: Denmark
- Position: Winger

Team information
- Current team: Sirius
- Number: 17

Youth career
- –2019: AB
- 2018-2019: Lyngby

Senior career*
Years	Team	Apps	(Gls)
2019–2024	Hvidovre	127	(22)
2024–	Sirius	66	(5)
- * Club domestic league appearances and goals as of 8 July 2026

Marcus Pheiffer Lindberg (born 27 June 2000) is a Danish footballer who plays as a winger for Allsvenskan club IK Sirius.

== Career ==
=== Hvidovre IF ===
After a season playing for Lyngby Boldklub's academy, Lindberg started training with Hvidovre IF's U23 team in July 2019. From here, it suddenly went fast; first, he came into the cup match against Brønshøj Boldklub on 28 August 2019, and scored the winning goal for Hvidovre's division team in extra time. Then he made his debut in the Danish 1st Division against Vendsyssel FF on September 1, and five days later Hvidovre signed Lindberg, making him part of the first team squad. Lindberg quickly became a profile in Hvidovre and a regular in the starting lineup.

In August 2022, three years after his debut, Lindberg celebrated his 100th game for Hvidovre. With 11 goals and 7 assists in 31 games, Lindberg was a crucial figure in Hvidovre's promotion to the 2023–24 Danish Superliga.

=== IK Sirius ===
On 26 January 2024 Lindberg was sold to Swedish club IK Sirius, signing a deal until June 2028.
