= Melker Heier =

Swedish footballer

Personal information
- Full name: Melker Jonathan Heier
- Date of birth: 8 May 2001 (age 25)
- Height: 1.81 m (5 ft 11 in)
- Position: Midfielder

Team information
- Current team: IK Sirius
- Number: 10

Youth career
- Häljarps IF
- IK Wormo
- 2013–2020: Landskrona BoIS

Senior career*
Years	Team	Apps	(Gls)
2020–2022	Landskrona BoIS	47	(4)
2023–	IK Sirius	95	(8)
- * Club domestic league appearances and goals as of 2 July 2026

Melker Jonathan Heier (born 8 May 2001) is a Swedish footballer who plays as a midfielder for IK Sirius in Allsvenskan.

== Career ==
Heier started his youth career in Häljarps IF. He joined Landskrona BoIS' youth setup at the age of 12, and was drafted into the senior squad in the autumn of 2020. He broke into the first team during 2021, and prolonged his contract through 2023. At the same time, Landskrona gained attention when spending part of 2021 atop the Superettan table, exclusively using players from Scania.

Following yet another good season in the Superettan, Heier was bought by IK Sirius in January 2023. He made his Allsvenskan debut in April 2023 against Norrköping. His combined number of goals and assists in 2023 was his all-time high.
