= Ekerö IK =

Swedish football club

- Full name: Ekerö Idrottsklubb
- Founded: 1921
- Ground: Träkvistavallen; Ekerö; Sweden
- Chairman: Anders Huldt
- League: Division 4 Mellersta
- 2012: Division 3 Norra Svealand, 1st (Promoted)
Home colours	Away colours

Ekerö IK is a Swedish club located in Ekerö.

== Background ==
Ekerö IK currently plays in Division 4 which is the sixth tier of Swedish football. They play their home matches at the Träkvistavallen in Ekerö.

The club is affiliated to Stockholms Fotbollförbund.

== Season to season ==
Season	Level	Division	Section	Position	Movements
2006*	Tier 6	Division 4	Stockholm Norra	12th	Relegated
2007	Tier 7	Division 5	Stockholm Mellersta	1st	Promoted
2008	Tier 6	Division 4	Stockholm Mellersta	7th	
2009	Tier 6	Division 4	Stockholm Mellersta	3rd	
2010	Tier 6	Division 4	Stockholm Mellersta	2nd	Promotion Playoffs
2011	Tier 6	Division 4	Stockholm Mellersta	1st	Promoted
2012	Tier 5	Division 3	Norra Svealand	1st	Promoted
2013	Tier 4	Division 2	Södra Svealand		

* League restructuring in 2006 resulted in a new division being created at Tier 3 and subsequent divisions dropping a level.
