= Joakim Persson (footballer, born 2002) =

Swedish footballer

Personal information
- Full name: Joakim Birger Persson
- Date of birth: 3 April 2002 (age 24)
- Place of birth: Sweden
- Height: 1.85 m (6 ft 1 in)
- Position: Forward

Team information
- Current team: IK Sirius
- Number: 7

Youth career
- 2008–2011: Utbynäs SK
- 2011–2017: Rimbo IF
- 2017–2019: IK Sirius

Senior career*
Years	Team	Apps	(Gls)
2019–	IK Sirius	95	(21)
2020	→ IFK Luleå (loan)	10	(4)
2021–2022	→ Brage (loan)	43	(10)

International career^{‡}
2023–2024	Sweden U21	3	(1)
2024	Sweden	1	(0)
- * Club domestic league appearances and goals as of 8 July 2026 ‡ National team caps and goals as of 16:42, 16 October 2024 (UTC)

Joakim Birger Persson (born 3 April 2002) is a Swedish footballer who plays as a forward for IK Sirius.

== Career ==
Persson is a youth product of Utbynäs SK, Rimbo IF and IK Sirius. On 19 October 2019, he made his first senior appearance for Sirius in an Allsvenskan match against Östersunds. On 28 November 2019, he signed his first professional contract with Sirius for 3 years. In August 2020, he was loaned to IFK Luleå for the season. In July 2021, he extended his contract with Sirius until 2024, and went on another loan to Brage. On 10 January 2022, his loan with Brage was extended for another season.

== International career ==
Persson is eligible to represent Ethiopia and Sweden. In November 2023, Persson was called up to the Sweden U21s for the first time for a set of 2025 UEFA European Under-21 Championship qualification matches.

Persson made his full international debut for the Sweden national team on 12 January 2024 in a friendly game against Estonia which Sweden won 2–1.

== Personal life ==
Persson is a devout Christian who belongs to the WAO Church in Sweden.

== Career statistics ==
=== Club ===
As of 29 June 2020.

Club	Season	League			Cup		Continental		Other		Total	
Club	Season	Division	Apps	Goals	Apps	Goals	Apps	Goals	Apps	Goals	Apps	Goals
IK Sirius	2019	Allsvenskan	2	0	0	0	0	0	0	0	2	0
IK Sirius	2020	Allsvenskan	3	0	2 (Note: Appearance(s) in Svenska Cupen)	0	0	0	0	0	5	0
Career total			5	0	2	0	0	0	0	0	7	0

=== International ===
Appearances and goals by national team and year
National team	Year	Apps	Goals
Sweden	2024	1	0
Total		1	0
