= Henrik Castegren =

Swedish footballer (born 1996)

Personal information
- Full name: Henrik Rönnlöf Castegren
- Date of birth: 28 March 1996 (age 30)
- Place of birth: Norrköping, Sweden
- Height: 1.85 m (6 ft 1 in)
- Position: Defender

Team information
- Current team: IK Sirius
- Number: 2

Senior career*
Years	Team	Apps	(Gls)
2014–2021	IFK Norrköping	82	(3)
2014–2016	→ IF Sylvia (loan)	54	(6)
2018	→ Degerfors IF (loan)	6	(1)
2022–2023	Lechia Gdańsk	7	(0)
2023–2024	IK Sirius	45	(2)
2025	Debrecen	12	(0)
2025–	IK Sirius	25	(3)

International career^{‡}
2024	Sweden	1	(0)
- * Club domestic league appearances and goals as of 8 July 2026 ‡ National team caps and goals as of 23:19, 12 January 2024 (UTC)

Henrik Rönnlöf Castegren (born 28 March 1996) is a Swedish professional footballer who plays as a defender for Allsvenskan club IK Sirius.

== Club career ==
=== Gdansk ===
On 18 February 2022, Castegren signed a contract with Lechia Gdańsk in Poland until 30 June 2024, with an option to extend. On 23 May 2023, following Lechia's relegation from Ekstraklasa, it was announced he would leave the club by mutual consent at the end of the month.

=== Debrecen ===
On 3 February 2025, Castegren signed a contract with Debreceni VSC in Hungary.

=== Back to Sirius ===
On 27 June 2025, Castegren went back to play for IK Sirius.

== International career ==
Castegren made his full international debut for the Sweden national team on 12 January 2024 in a friendly game against Estonia which Sweden won 2–1.

== Career statistics ==
=== International ===
Appearances and goals by national team and year
National team	Year	Apps	Goals
Sweden	2024	1	0
Total		1	0
