= IK Sirius Fotboll =

Association football club in Sweden

Sirius
- Full name: Idrottsklubben Sirius
- Nickname: Blåsvart (Blue-Black)
- Founded: 9 august 1907; 119 years ago
- Ground: Studenternas IP, Uppsala
- Capacity: 10,522
- Chairman: Ulrika Moström Ågren
- Head coach: Andreas Engelmark
- League: Allsvenskan
- 2025: Allsvenskan, 9th of 16
- Website: www.siriusfotboll.se
Home colours	Away colours	Third colours

Idrottsklubben Sirius, more commonly known as IK Sirius or Sirius, is a Swedish professional football club located in Uppsala. The club is affiliated with Upplands Fotbollförbund and play their home games at Studenternas IP.

IK Sirius are currently playing in the Swedish top flight Allsvenskan for the tenth season in a row after having spent much of their history in lower divisions.

== History ==
=== Founding ===
On 9 August 1907 the sports club that would become known as IK Sirius was founded in a ditch at the side of a sporting ground in Uppsala. Names like Svartbäckens IK and IK Spurt were originally used but on 5 April 1908 the members settled on the current name. The club was originally founded for athletics, but took up football the following year.

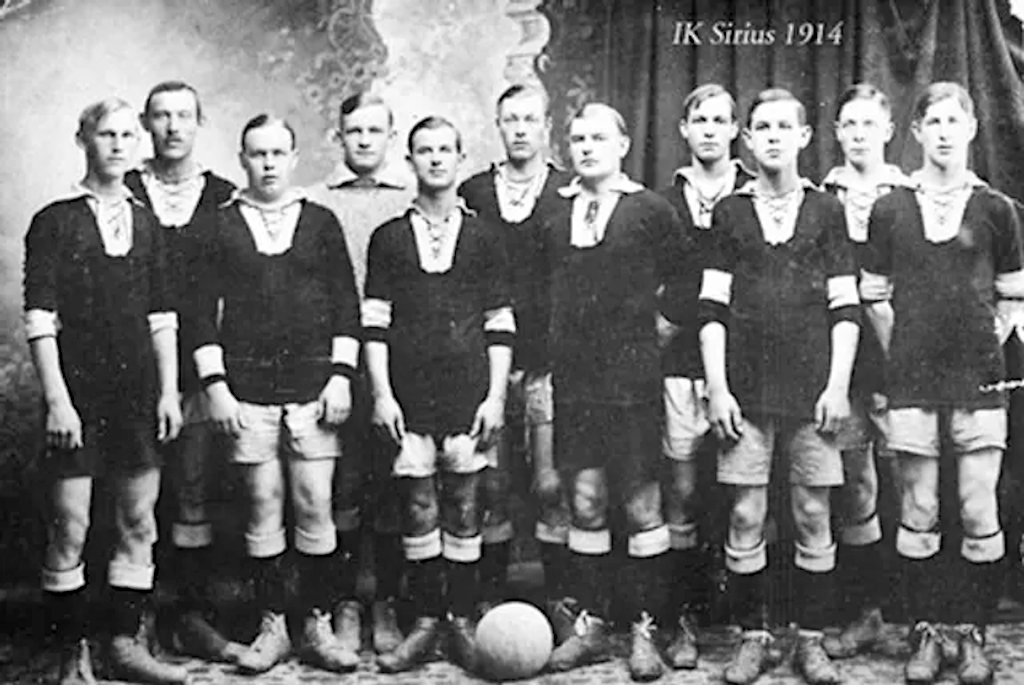
The IK Sirius football team of 1914.

In the 1910s Sirius started competing in Svenska Mästerskapet which was the cup competition that decided who would become the Swedish Champions at that time. In 1917 they reached the semi-finals after victories against teams such as Hammarby IF and IFK Norrköping, a feat which they would repeat again the following year. Their greatest success in the pre-Allsvenskan era came in 1924 when they made it all the way to the Svenska Mästerskapet final where they lost against Fässbergs IF.

=== The Allsvenskan years ===
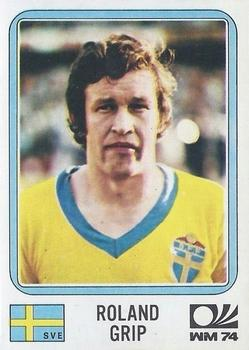
Roland Grip was a Sirius player when he participated in the 1974 FIFA World Cup.

After the formation of the Swedish football league system the club had spent forty years in lower divisions when businessman Owe Bergström became club president in 1964. Even though Sirius was playing in the third tier at the time he was able to use his personal wealth to sign five players from reigning Swedish champions Djurgårdens IF, three of who were part of the Sweden men's national football team. This enabled them to gain promotion to Allsvenskan in 1968, although they were relegated after just one season. The pinnacle was reached during the years of 1973–1974, when the club again gained promotion to the highest division and its squad contained a number of high-profile players, such as Roland Grip.

=== Obscurity and comeback ===
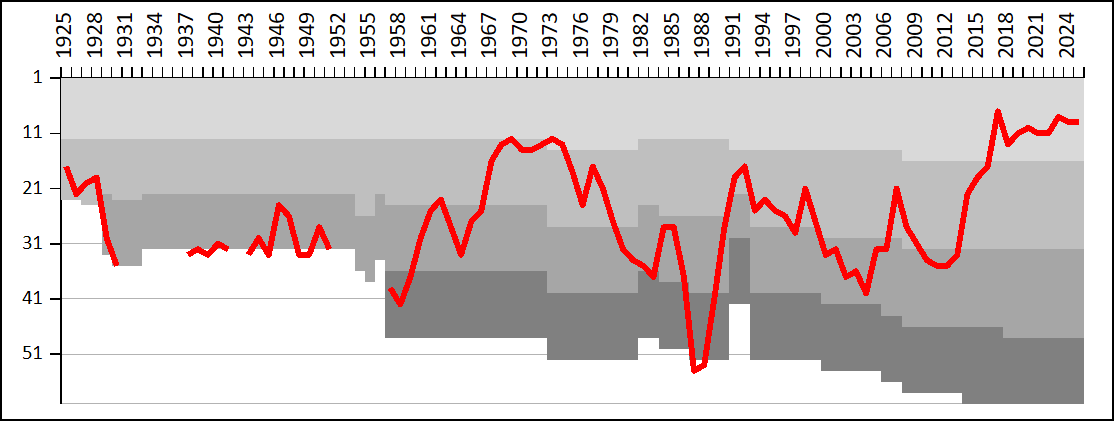
A chart showing the progress of IK Sirius through the Swedish football league system. The different shades of grey represent league divisions.

After the club's relegation from Allsvenskan in 1974, Sirius played in the second division until they plummeted all the way down to the fourth tier following a couple of difficult years in the beginning of the 1980s. The club recovered slightly and the 1990s were mostly spent in the second tier of Swedish football. However, the club had accumulated large debts and was struggling financially during those decades.

Just as the new fully national second tier Superettan was started in the early 2000s Sirius found themselves back down in the third division again. It would take until 2006 for the team under manager Magnus Pehrsson to be able to get promoted again through a promotion playoff against Väsby United where Uppsala-born team captain Olle Kullinger scored the deciding goal and the club would get to celebrate their 100 year anniversary in the 2007 Superettan.

=== Superettan and promotion back to Allsvenskan ===
A big turning point for Sirius came in 2010 when businessman Bengt Ågerup started investing in the club. Even though they were at that point back in the third tier his financial backing enabled them to strengthen their organization with former player Ola Andersson as the new club president, Kim Bergstrand and Thomas Lagerlöf as first team coaches and Petter Hansson as head of the youth academy. Ågerup also paid the full salary of star signing Johan Arneng and covered any yearly losses the club had financially. His investments in the club ended abruptly in 2013 when his company was raided by the Swedish tax authorities due to around $120 million in unpaid taxes.

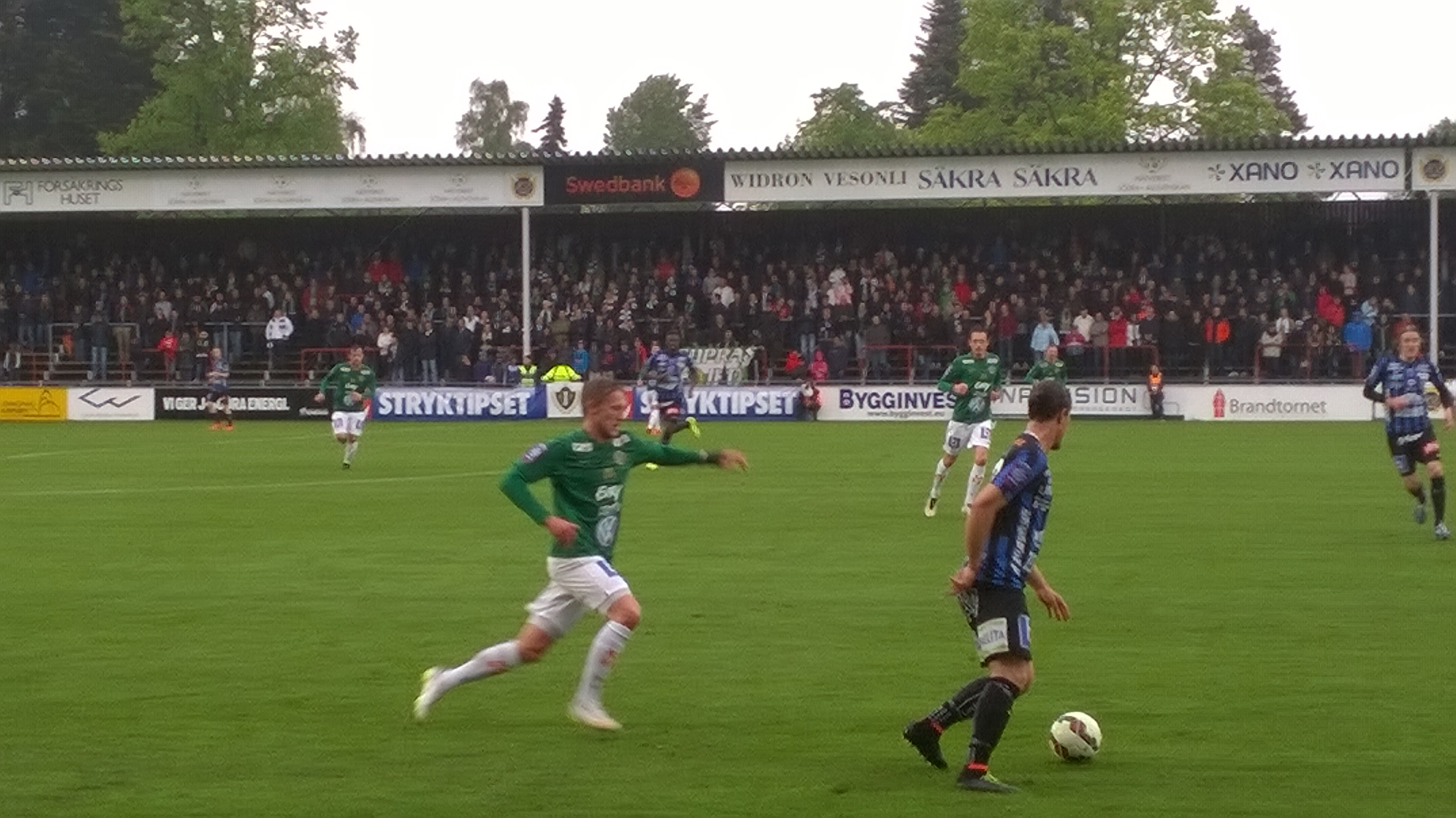
Sirius playing away against Jönköpings Södra IF in the 2015 Superettan.

The investments had paid off however, as in that same year the club won the 2013 Division 1 without losing a single game and returned to Superettan. They also started seeing success in the Swedish Cup where they reached the quarter finals, and the following year the semi-finals. Sirius finished in sixth place in their first year back in the second tier and the next season they barely missed out on reaching the top division after losing the promotion play-offs on the away goals rule. Success would come though in the 2016 Superettan where they finished in first place, qualifying them for promotion with two game left of the season and returning to Allsvenskan after a 42-year-absence.

=== Allsvenskan and a strategy change ===
Since returning to Sweden's top flight the club has shifted away from relying on outside investments and is instead focused on developing and giving playing time to young players. When the players eventually get sold that money is reinvested both in infrastructure for the club and the next generation of young players. In the summer of 2026 Sirius made their biggest ever transfer when Robbie Ure was sold to La Liga club Sevilla FC for £5.6m plus add-ons.

== Kit ==
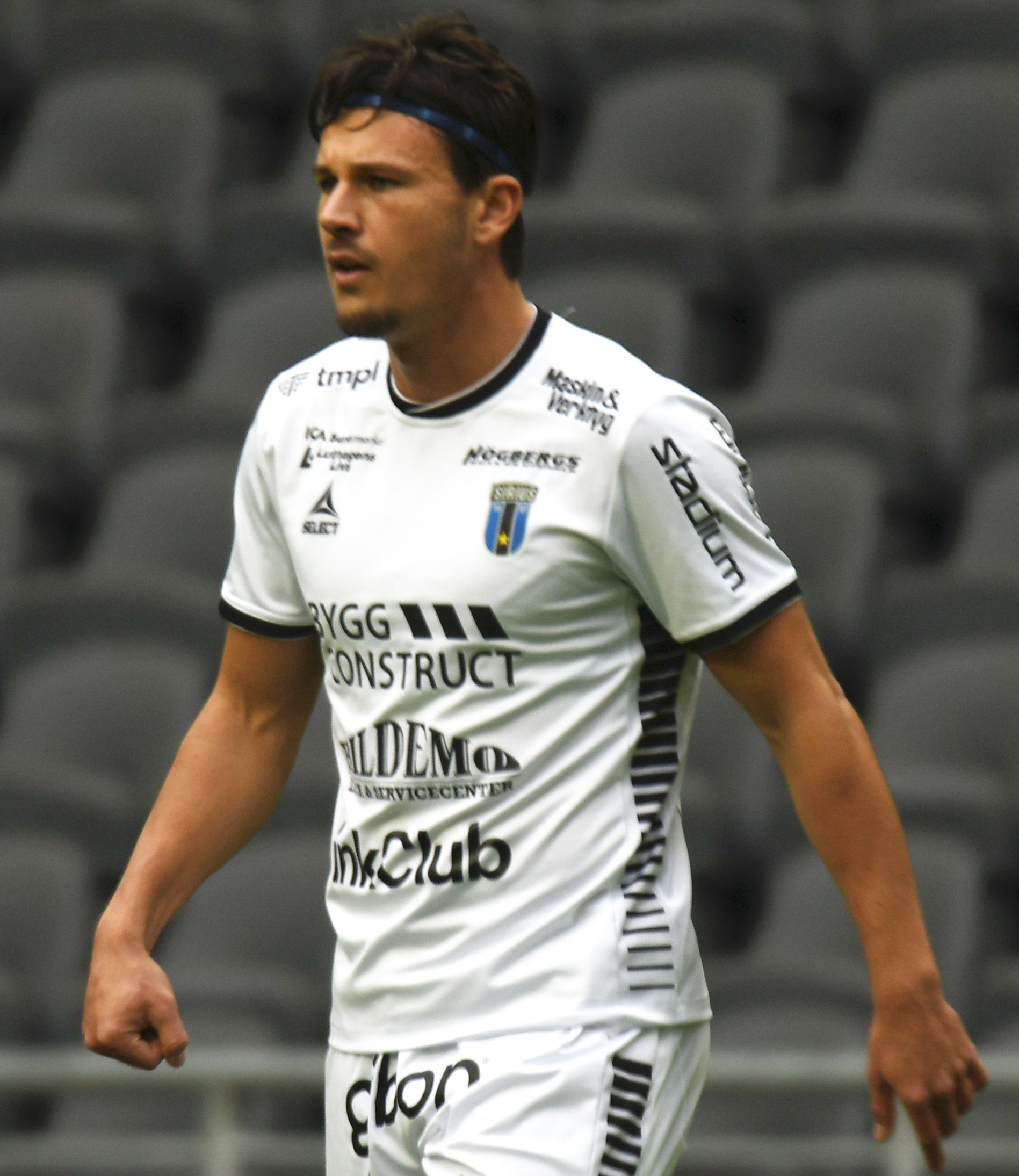
Stefano Vecchia wearing the clubs all white away kit in 2020.

Sirius play in blue and black vertically striped shirts with black shorts and socks, although historically there have been other variations. In the early days of the clubs existence they used all black shirts and during the era of being sponsored by businessman Owe Bergström in the 1960s and 1970s they wore all white home kits as he was a fan of Real Madrid and wanted Sirius to look similar to the spanish club. The all white version is now used as the teams away kit. Sirius are also known to at times have a yellow star underneath the club badge on their shirts.

Period	Kit manufacturer	Shirt sponsor (chest)
–2009	(Germany) Puma	Phadia
2010–2014	(United States) Nike	UNT
2015–2017	(United States) Nike	Volkswagen
2018–2019	(United States) Nike	Byggconstruct
2020–	(Denmark) Select	Byggconstruct

== Recent seasons ==
Summary of the ten most recent seasons for IK Sirius:

Season	Division	Tier	Pos	Pl	W	D	L	+	-	P	Cup	Attendances
2016	Superettan	2	↑ 1	30	18	7	5	54	23	61	Group stage	2,916
2017	Allsvenskan	1	7	30	11	7	12	46	51	40	Group stage	5,174
2018	Allsvenskan	1	13	30	8	6	16	37	61	30	Group stage	3,998
2019	Allsvenskan	1	11	30	8	5	17	34	51	29	Group stage	4,288
2020	Allsvenskan	1	10	30	9	11	10	43	51	38	Group stage	0
2021	Allsvenskan	1	11	30	10	7	13	39	53	37	Group stage	4,580
2022	Allsvenskan	1	11	30	9	8	13	31	42	35	Group stage	5,614
2023	Allsvenskan	1	8	30	12	6	12	51	44	42	Group stage	6,329
2024	Allsvenskan	1	9	30	12	5	13	47	46	41	Group stage	7,033
2025	Allsvenskan	1	9	30	11	6	13	53	51	39	Semifinals	6,742

== Stadium ==
Sirius play their home games at Studenternas IP located at the side of the Fyris river running through central Uppsala. It was originally built in 1909 as a sports ground funded collaboratively by the Students' union and the government. Designed to also host a variety of other activities besides football the stadium opened with a game of bandy and also hosted athletics. In 2018 work began to gradually demolish the old stadium and replace it with a newly built football stadium with the same name which was finalized before the start of the 2020 Allsvenskan season.

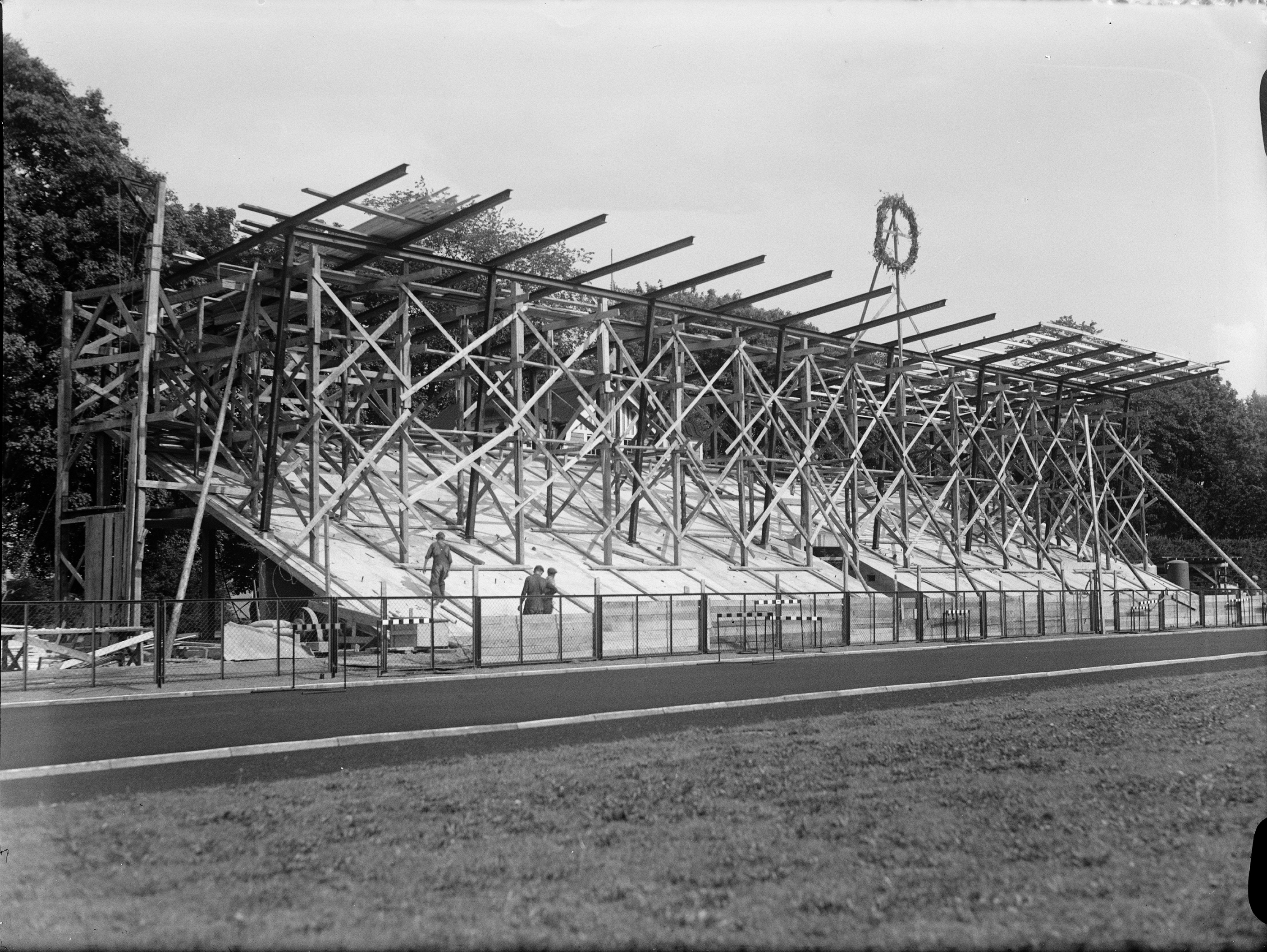
The old main stand being built in 1939.

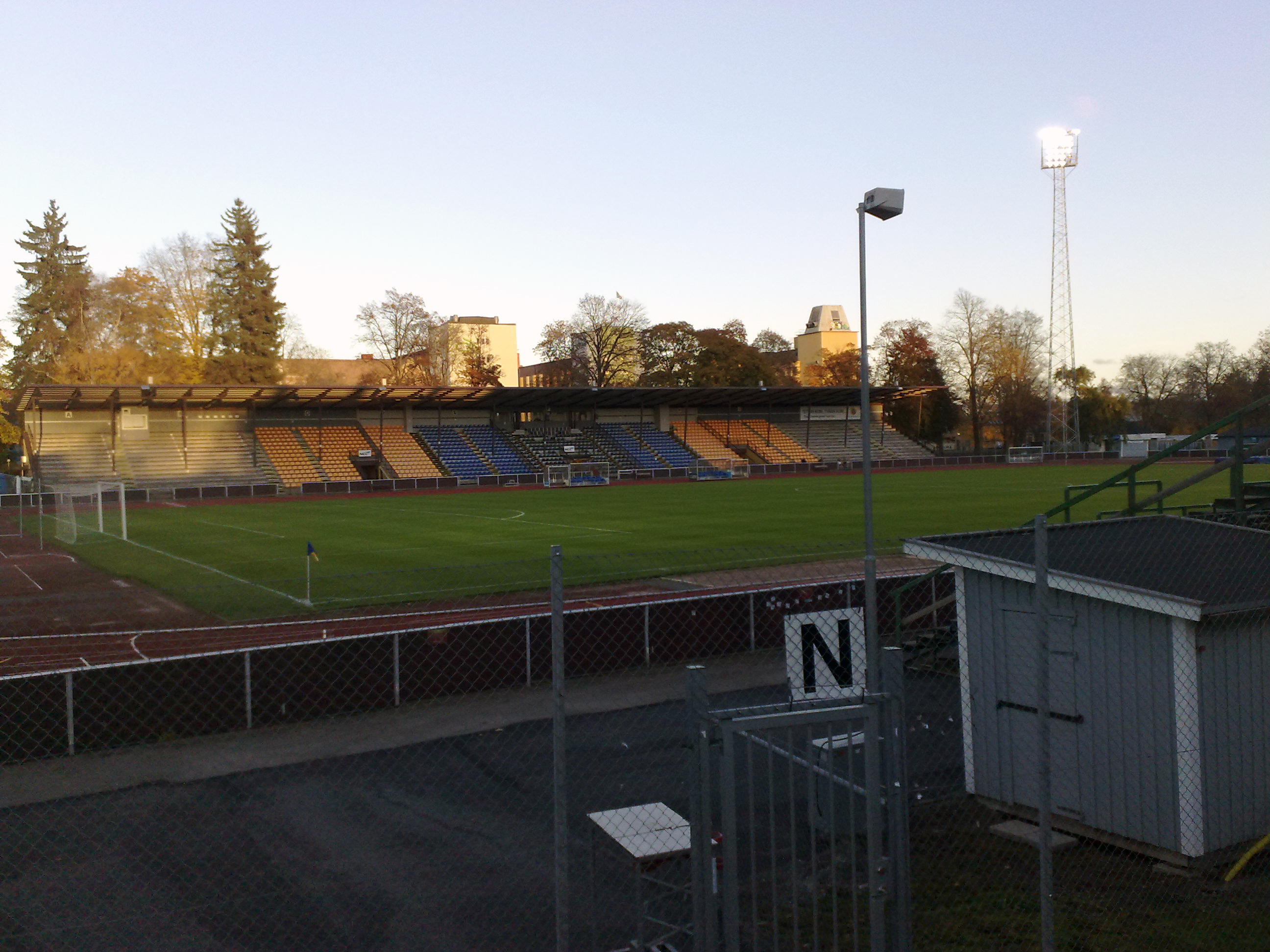
Studenternas IP in 2013 before the rebuild.

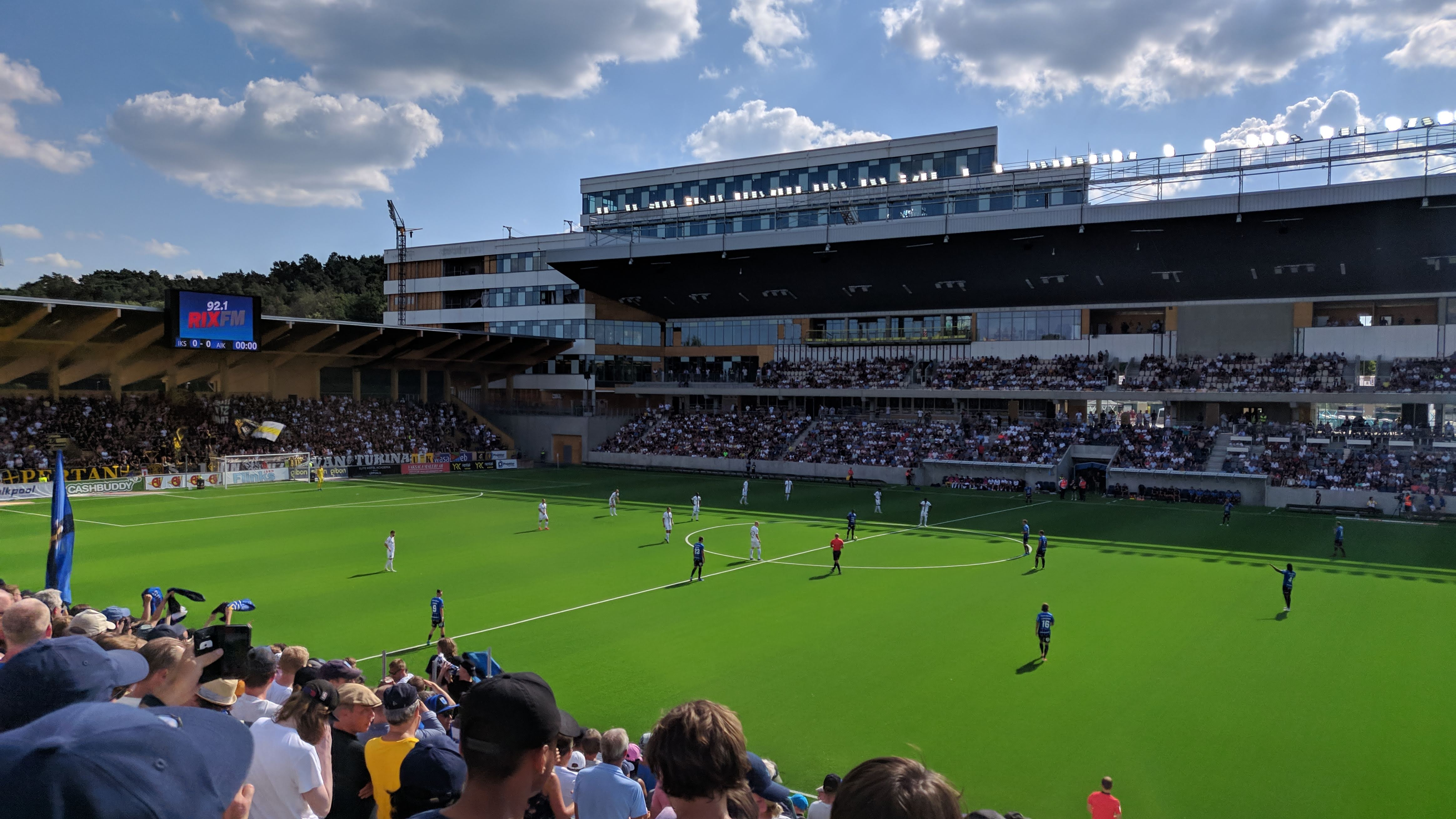
The rebuilt stadium which is used by Sirius today.

== Players ==
=== Current squad ===
As of 3 September 2026

Note: Flags indicate national team as defined under FIFA eligibility rules; some limited exceptions apply. Players may hold more than one non-FIFA nationality.

No.	Pos.	Nation	Player
1	GK	MLI	Ismael Diawara
2	DF	GUI	Mohamed Soumah
4	DF	DEN	Tobias Anker
5	DF	SWE	Henrik Castegren
6	MF	DEN	Marcus Lindberg
7	FW	SWE	Joakim Persson
8	MF	NED	Matthias Nartey
9	FW	NED	Jesper Uneken
10	MF	SWE	Melker Heier
11	FW	SWE	Isak Bjerkebo
12	DF	SWE	Isaac Höök
15	DF	SWE	Simon Sandberg

No.	Pos.	Nation	Player
16	MF	FIN	Otso Liimatta
17	FW	SWE	Neo Jönsson
18	MF	SWE	Adam Wikman
20	DF	SWE	Victor Ekström
21	MF	SWE	Charlie Nildén
22	DF	SWE	Oscar Krusnell
24	MF	SWE	Victor Svensson
25	FW	NGR	Samuel Adindu
30	FW	HUN	Zalán Vancsa
34	GK	SWE	David Celic
35	DF	SWE	Elliot Eld
36	MF	SWE	August Ljungberg

=== Out on loan ===
Note: Flags indicate national team as defined under FIFA eligibility rules; some limited exceptions apply. Players may hold more than one non-FIFA nationality.

No.	Pos.	Nation	Player
3	DF	UKR	Bohdan Milovanov (at IF Gnistan until 31 December 2026)
8	MF	DEN	Andreas Pyndt (at Fredericia until 30 June 2027)
19	FW	SWE	Noel Milleskog (at Degerfors IF until 30 November 2026)
23	FW	SCO	Finlay Neat (at Norrby IF until 30 November 2026)

No.	Pos.	Nation	Player
26	MF	SWE	Hugo Mella (at IFK Värnamo until 30 November 2026)
27	DF	SWE	Ben Magnusson (at IFK Stocksund until 30 November 2026)
39	GK	SWE	Villy Strindlund (at IFK Stocksund until 30 November 2026)

=== Notable players ===
The following players are either included in the top ten of the Uppsala Nya Tidning article series on the greatest Sirius players of all time, or in the list of the supporters' favorite players from the official IK Sirius website.

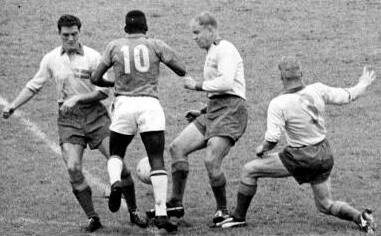
Sigge Parling on the right side of Brazilian footballer Pelé during the 1958 FIFA World Cup Final.

Name	Years
(Sweden) Leif Eriksson	1967–1968, 1976–1979
(Sweden) Roland Grip	1971–1975
(Sweden) Hans Selander	1973–1974
(Sweden) Stefano Vecchia	2017–2020
(Sweden) Klebér Saarenpää	1993–1994
(Sweden) Björn Carlsson	1969–1974
(Sweden) Ola Andersson	1990–1994, 2001
(Palestine) Moustafa Zeidan	2021–2022
(Sweden) Hans Nilsson	1966–1968, 1974–1975, 1979
(Nigeria) Moses Ogbu	2010–2015, 2017–2018
(Sweden) Sigge Parling	1961–1962
(Italy) Jano Alicata	1966–196?
(Sweden) Morgan Hedlund	1968–1970
(Sweden) Henrik Östlin	1973–?
(Iran) Gholam Hashempour	1980–1981, 1984–1985
(England) Darren Foreman	1995
(Sweden) Kjell Johansson	1997–2001

== Management ==
=== Technical staff ===
As of 21 August 2026

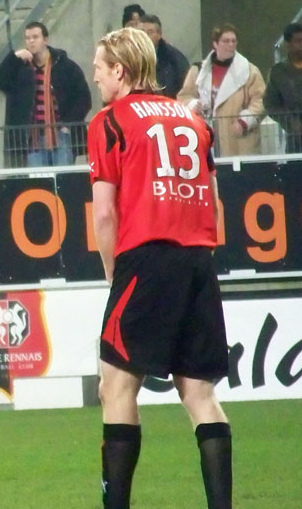
Former Sweden men's national football team player Petter Hansson currently work as the clubs transition coach.

Name	Role
(Sweden) Jonathan Ederström	Sporting director
(Sweden) Andreas Engelmark	Head coach
(Sweden) Max Westerberg	Assistant coaches
(Sweden) Henrik Åhnstrand	Assistant coaches
(Sweden) Petter Hansson	Transition coach
(Morocco) Karim Fegrouch	Goalkeeping coach
(Sweden) John Swärd	Head of scouting
(Sweden) Fredrik Leierdahl	Scout
(Sweden) Tobias Myhrberg	Analyst
(Republic of Ireland) Diarmuid Clancy	Fitness coach
(Sweden) Jakob Johansson	Team doctor
(Sweden) Oskar Widlund	Chiropractics
(Sweden) Petter Isaksson	Chiropractics
(Sweden) Gert Andersson	Equipment manager

=== Managerial history ===
- (Sweden) Sigge Parling (1965–1966)
- (England) Sid Huntley (1972)
- (Sweden) Torsten Furukrantz (1974)
- (England) Alan Ball Sr. (1975–1976)
- (Sweden) Per Hansson (1987–1992)
- (Sweden) Dan Sundblad (1997)
- (Sweden) Kjell Jonevret (1998–1999)
- (Sweden) Stellan Carlsson (2000–2003)
- (Sweden) Zaine Söderlund and (Sweden) Per Widén (2004)
- (Sweden) Zaine Söderlund (2005)
- (Sweden) Magnus Pehrsson (2006)
- (Sweden) Pär Millqvist (2007–2008)
- (Sweden) Andreas Brännström (2009–2011)
- (Sweden) Kim Bergstrand and (Sweden) Thomas Lagerlöf (2012–2018)
- (Sweden) Henrik Rydström and (Sweden) (Bosnia and Herzegovina) Mirza Jelečak (2019)
- (Sweden) Henrik Rydström (2020)
- (Sweden) Daniel Bäckström (2021–2022)
- (Sweden) Christer Mattiasson (2023–2024)
- (Sweden) Andreas Engelmark (2025–)

== Honours ==
=== Cup ===
- Svenska Mästerskapet:
  - Runners-up (1): 1924

=== League ===
- Superettan:
  - Winners (1): 2016
- Division 1 Norra:
  - Winners (1): 2013
  - Runners-up (2): 2006, 2010
- Division 2 Östra Svealand:
  - Winners (1): 1997
