= 1995–96 Svenska Cupen =

Tournament details
- Country: Sweden

Final positions
- Champions: AIK
- Runners-up: Malmö FF

Tournament statistics
- Matches played: 303

The 1995–96 Svenska Cupen was the 41st season of the main Swedish football Cup. The competition was concluded on 23 May 1996 with the final held in Gamla Ullevi, Gothenburg. AIK won 1-0 (golden goal) against Malmö FF before an attendance of 2,745 spectators. A different format was used for the competition with the number of teams entered reduced by almost half compared with the previous year and the third round was run on a group basis.

== First round ==
For results see SFS-Bolletinen - Matcher i Svenska Cupen.

== Second round ==
For results see SFS-Bolletinen - Matcher i Svenska Cupen.

== Third round ==
This round was run on a group basis

Tie no	Home team	Score	Away team	Attendance
1	Älvsjö AIK FF (D2)	0–4	AIK (A)	
2	AIK (A)	4–0	Visby IF Gute (D1)	
3	Spårvägens FF (D2)	0–0 (p. 5–4)	AIK (A)	

For results and tables see SFS-Bolletinen - Matcher i Svenska Cupen.

=== Group C ===
Pos	Team	Pld	W	D	L	GF	GA	GD	Pts
1	IF Brommapojkarna	3	3	0	0	4	0	+4	9
2	Djurgårdens IF	3	2	0	1	5	2	+3	6
3	Spånga	3	1	0	2	3	2	+1	3
4	Forssa	3	0	0	3	0	8	−8	0

== Fourth round ==
The 8 matches in this round were played between 31 March and 3 April 1996.

Tie no	Home team	Score	Away team	Attendance
1	IK Sirius (D1)	3–4 (gg)	Östers IF (A)	178
2	IS Halmia (D2)	3–4	IFK Malmö (D2)	90
3	IF Sylvia (D2)	2–1	IFK Göteborg (A)	810
4	IF Elfsborg (D1)	0–4	Örgryte IS (A)	505
5	Malmö FF (A)	1–1 (p. 3–2)	Halmstads BK (A)	1,472
6	GIF Sundsvall (D1)	1–2 (gg)	AIK (A)	900
7	IF Brommapojkarna (D1)	1–1 (p. 5–4)	Degerfors IF (A)	230
8	Hammarby IF (A)	2–1	Västra Frölunda IF (A)	1,300

== Quarter-finals ==
The 4 matches in this round were played between 8 April and 11 April 1996.

Tie no	Home team	Score	Away team	Attendance
1	Östers IF (A)	1–2 (gg)	Malmö FF (A)	1,056
2	IF Sylvia (D2)	0–3	Hammarby IF (A)	860
3	IFK Malmö (D2)	0–1 (gg)	IF Brommapojkarna (D1)	585
4	AIK (A)	2–1	Örgryte IS (A)	2,149

== Semi-finals ==
The semi-finals were played on 17 April 1996.

Tie no	Home team	Score	Away team	Attendance
1	AIK (A)	1–0	Hammarby IF (A)	10,672
2	IF Brommapojkarna (D1)	1–3	Malmö FF (A)	302

== Final ==
The final was played on 23 May 1996 in Gamla Ullevi, Gothenburg.

Tie no	Team 1	Score	Team 2	Attendance
1	AIK (A)	1–0 (gg)	Malmö FF (A)	2,745
