= 2021–22 Odense Boldklub season =

Odense Boldklub
2021–22 season
- Chairman: Niels Thorborg
- Manager: Andreas Alm
- Stadium: Nature Energy Park
- Danish Superliga: 8th
- Danish Cup: Runner-up
- Top goalscorer: League: Issam Jebali (10); All: Issam Jebali (11)
| Home colours | Away colours | Third colours |

The 2021–22 Odense Boldklub season was the club's 133rd season, and their 60th appearance in the Danish Superliga.

== First team ==
Last updated on 31 March 2022

| Squad no. | Name | Nationality | Position | Date of birth (age) |
Goalkeepers
| 13 | Hans Christian Bernat | (Denmark) | GK | 13 November 2000 (aged 21) |
| 27 | Magnus Nielsen | (Denmark) | GK | 4 August 2004 (aged 17) |
| 30 | Sayouba Mandé | (Ivory Coast) | GK | 15 June 1993 (aged 28) |
Defenders
| 2 | Nicholas Mickelson | (Norway) | RB | 24 July 1999 (aged 22) |
| 4 | Ryan Johnson Laursen | (Denmark) | RB | 14 April 1992 (aged 30) |
| 5 | Kasper Larsen | (Denmark) | CB | 25 January 1993 (aged 29) |
| 6 | Jeppe Tverskov (3rd captain) | (Denmark) | CB | 12 March 1993 (aged 29) |
| 16 | Jørgen Skjelvik | (Norway) | LB | 5 July 1991 (aged 30) |
| 17 | Jonathan Khemdee | (Denmark) | CB | 9 May 2002 (aged 20) |
| 18 | Mathias Brems | (Denmark) | LB | 13 March 2002 (aged 20) |
| 22 | Mihajlo Ivančević | (Serbia) | CB | 7 April 1999 (aged 23) |
| 24 | Robin Østrøm | (Denmark) | RB/CB | 9 August 2002 (aged 19) |
| 25 | Joel King | (New Zealand) | LB | 30 October 2000 (aged 21) |
| 28 | Christian Vestergaard | (Denmark) | CB | 26 April 2001 (aged 21) |
Midfielders
| 8 | Jakob Breum | (Denmark) | LM | 17 November 2003 (aged 18) |
| 14 | Jens Jakob Thomasen (captain) | (Denmark) | CM/AM | 25 May 1996 (aged 26) |
| 19 | Aron Elís Thrándarson | (Iceland) | AM/CM | 10 November 1994 (aged 27) |
| 20 | Ayo Simon Okosun | (Denmark) | CM | 21 July 1993 (aged 28) |
| 21 | Tarik Ibrahimagic | (Denmark) | CM | 23 June 2001 (aged 20) |
| 23 | Troels Kløve | (Denmark) | LM/CM | 23 October 1990 (aged 31) |
| 29 | Mads Frøkjær-Jensen | (Denmark) | LM/CM | 29 July 1999 (aged 22) |
Forwards
| 7 | Issam Jebali | (Tunisia) | ST/AM | 25 December 1991 (aged 30) |
| 9 | Bashkim Kadrii (vice-captain) | (Denmark) | ST | 9 July 1991 (aged 30) |
| 10 | Sander Svendsen | (Denmark) | LW/RW | 6 August 1997 (aged 24) |
| 11 | Emmanuel Sabbi | (United States) | LW/RW | 24 December 1997 (aged 24) |
| 15 | Max Fenger | (Denmark) | ST | 7 August 2001 (aged 20) |
| 26 | Mikkel Hyllegaard | (Denmark) | ST | 16 May 1999 (aged 23) |

== Transfers ==
=== Transfers in ===
| Entry date | Position | No. | Player | From club | Fee | Ref. |
|---|---|---|---|---|---|---|
| 30 June 2021 | DF | 22 | (Denmark) Daniel Obbekjær | (Italy) S.P.A.L. | Return from loan | |
| 1 July 2021 | DF | 18 | (Denmark) Mathias Brems | Youth academy | | |
| 1 July 2021 | DF | 17 | (Denmark) Jonathan Khemdee | Youth academy | | |
| 31 August 2021 | DF | 2 | (Norway) Nicholas Mickelson | (Norway) Strømsgodset | | |
| 1 October 2021 | GK | 27 | (Denmark) Magnus Nielsen | Youth academy | | |
| 17 November 2021 | MF | 22 | (Denmark) Jakob Breum | Youth academy | | |
| 1 January 2022 | FW | 10 | (Norway) Sander Svendsen | (Norway) Odds | Return from loan | |
| 27 January 2022 | DF | 22 | (Serbia) Mihajlo Ivančević | (Serbia) Spartak Subotica | | |
| 29 January 2022 | DF | 25 | (New Zealand) Joel King | (Australia) Sydney | | |
| Total | | | | | | |

=== Transfers out ===
| Departure date | Position | No. | Player | To club | Fee | Ref. |
|---|---|---|---|---|---|---|
| 30 June 2021 | DF | 2 | (Denmark) Oliver Lund | (Denmark) AGF | End of contract | |
| 30 June 2021 | MF | 8 | (Denmark) Janus Drachmann | (Denmark) Horsens | End of contract | |
| 30 June 2021 | FW | 17 | (Iceland) Sveinn Gudjohnsen | (Italy) Spezia | End of loan | |
| 30 June 2021 | GK | 27 | (Denmark) Oliver Christensen | (Germany) Hertha BSC | 22,500,000 DKK | |
| 31 December 2021 | DF | — | (Denmark) Daniel Obbekjær | | Released | |
| 27 January 2022 | FW | 9 | (Netherlands) Mart Lieder | (Netherlands) Emmen | Released | |
| Total | | | | | | |

=== Loans out ===
| Start date | End date | Position | No. | Player | To club | Ref |
|---|---|---|---|---|---|---|
| 1 July 2021 | 30 June 2022 | FW | — | (Denmark) Rasmus Nissen | (Denmark) Kolding | |
| 31 August 2021 | 31 December 2021 | FW | 10 | (Denmark) Sander Svendsen | (Norway) Odds | |
| 24 January 2022 | 30 June 2022 | MF | 25 | (Uganda) Moses Opondo | (Denmark) Horsens | |
| 31 March 2022 | 30 June 2022 | DF | 3 | (Denmark) Alexander Juel Andersen | (Norway) Aalesund | |

=== New contracts ===
| Date | Pos | No. | Player | Ref. |
|---|---|---|---|---|
| 30 December 2021 | FW | 15 | (Denmark) Max Fenger | |

== Friendlies ==
=== Pre-season ===
| 29 June 2021 Friendly | Næsby (Denmark) | 1–3 | (Denmark) Odense | Odense, Denmark |
| 18:00 CEST | Stoustrup 11' | Report | Jebali 4'; Fenger 15'; Lieder 53' | Stadium: ALPI Arena Næsby; Attendance: 490 |

| 3 July 2021 Friendly | Odense (Denmark) | 7–0 | (Denmark) Fremad Amager | Nyborg, Denmark |
| 13:00 CEST | Jebali 3'; Kadrii 10'; Fenger 43'; Lieder 46', 73'; Frøkjær-Jensen 63'; Opondo 87' | Report | | Stadium: Nyborg Idrætscenter |

| 7 July 2021 Friendly | Odense (Denmark) | 1–1 | (Denmark) Brøndby | Nyborg, Denmark |
| 13:00 CEST | Lieder 74' | Report | Maxsø 58' | Stadium: Nyborg Idrætscenter |

| 10 July 2021 Friendly | St. Pauli (Germany) | 2–2 | (Denmark) Odense | Hamborg, Denmark |
| 13:05 CEST | Makienok 41'; Daschner 69' | Report | Thrandarson 49'; Kadrii 59' | Stadium: Edmund-Plambeck Stadion |

=== Winter ===
| 20 January 2022 Friendly | Odense (Denmark) | 2–1 | (Denmark) Fredericia | Odense, Denmark |
| 13:00 CEST | Breum 31'; Svendsen 55' | Report | Johansen 65' | Stadium: Ådalen; Referee: Jonas Bøgelund |

| 27 January 2022 Friendly | Silkeborg (Denmark) | 2–0 | (Denmark) Odense | Silkeborg, Denmark |
| 13:00 CEST | Klynge 13'; Tengstedt 77' | Report | | Stadium: Jysk Park |

| 5 February 2022 Friendly | Odense (Denmark) | 0–0 | (Denmark) Vejle | Belek, Turkey |
| 09:00 CEST | | Report |

| 10 February 2022 Friendly | Odense (Denmark) | 1–0 | (Georgia (country)) Torpedo Kutaisi | Belek, Turkey |
| 11:00 CEST | Augustinus-Jensen 13' | Report |

| 12 February 2022 Friendly | Odense (Denmark) | 2–3 | (Ukraine) Zorya Luhansk | Belek, Turkey |
| 15:00 CEST | Jebali 24', 53' (pen.) | Report | Owusu 3'; Khomchenovskiy 61'; Buletsa 76' |

== Competitions ==
=== Superliga ===
==== League table ====
| Pos | Team | Pld | W | D | L | GF | GA | GD | Pts | Qualification |
|---|---|---|---|---|---|---|---|---|---|---|
| 7 | Viborg | 22 | 6 | 9 | 7 | 31 | 33 | −2 | 27 | Qualification for the Relegation round |
| 8 | AGF | 22 | 6 | 8 | 8 | 24 | 29 | −5 | 26 | Qualification for the Relegation round |
| 9 | OB | 22 | 4 | 9 | 9 | 31 | 35 | −4 | 21 | Qualification for the Relegation round |
| 10 | Nordsjælland | 22 | 5 | 6 | 11 | 24 | 37 | −13 | 21 | Qualification for the Relegation round |
| 11 | Vejle | 22 | 4 | 4 | 14 | 21 | 48 | −27 | 16 | Qualification for the Relegation round |

Source: Danish Football Association (in Danish), Soccerway
Rules for classification: 1) Points; 2) Goal difference; 3) Goals scored; 4) Away goals scored; 5) Play-off (played on neutral ground if determining teams for different rounds); 6) Draw.

==== Results summary ====
| Overall | | | | | | | | Home | | | | | | Away | | | | | |
| Pld | W | D | L | GF | GA | GD | Pts | W | D | L | GF | GA | GD | W | D | L | GF | GA | GD |
|---|---|---|---|---|---|---|---|---|---|---|---|---|---|---|---|---|---|---|---|
| 22 | 4 | 9 | 9 | 31 | 35 | −4 | 21 | 3 | 4 | 4 | 20 | 16 | +4 | 1 | 5 | 5 | 11 | 19 | −8 |

Last updated: 20 March 2022.

==== Results by round ====
| Matchday | 1 | 2 | 3 | 4 | 5 | 6 | 7 | 8 | 9 | 10 | 11 | 12 | 13 | 14 | 15 | 16 | 17 | 18 | 19 | 20 | 21 | 22 |
|---|---|---|---|---|---|---|---|---|---|---|---|---|---|---|---|---|---|---|---|---|---|---|
| Ground | A | A | H | A | H | H | A | H | A | A | H | H | A | H | A | H | H | A | H | A | H | A |
| Result | W | D | L | L | D | D | D | W | L | D | W | L | D | D | L | L | W | L | D | D | L | L |
| Position | 2 | 2 | 5 | 8 | 7 | 8 | 9 | 7 | 7 | 9 | 6 | 8 | 7 | 7 | 8 | 9 | 9 | 9 | 9 | 9 | 9 | 9 |

Updated to match(es) played on 20 March 2022. Source:
A = Away; H = Home; W = Win; D = Draw; L = Loss

==== Matches ====
| 16 July 2021 1 | Midtjylland | 1–2 | Odense | Odense |
| 19:00 CEST | Sisto 59' | Report | Kadrii 15'; Juel (yellow card) 50'; Sabbi (yellow card) 54'; Larsen (yellow card) 61'; Skjelvik 90+1' | Stadium: Nature Energy Park; Attendance: 5,000; Referee: Sandi Putros |

| 25 July 2021 2 | Randers | 1–1 | Odense | Randers |
| 14:00 CEST | Johnsen (yellow card) 18'; Kamara 33'; Greve (yellow card) 42' | Report | Thomasen 15'; Jebali (yellow card) 43' | Stadium: Cepheus Park Randers; Attendance: 2,927; Referee: Jakob Sundberg |

| 1 August 2021 3 | Odense | 0–2 | Copenhagen | Odense |
| 18:00 CEST | | Report | Wind 12'; Diks 57'; Nelsson (yellow card) 89' | Stadium: Nature Energy Park; Attendance: 12,493; Referee: Jakob Kehlet |

| 9 August 2021 4 | Nordsjælland | 3–1 | Odense | Farum |
| 19:00 CEST | Villadsen 2'; Diomande (yellow card) 26'; Schjelderup 73' (pen.); Adingra 90' | Report | Frøkjær-Jensen (yellow card) 19'; Jebali 46'; Thomasen (yellow card) 78' | Stadium: Right to Dream Park; Attendance: 2,485; Referee: Sandi Putros |

| 15 August 2021 5 | Odense | 1–1 | Silkeborg | Odense |
| 16:00 CEST | Thomasen (yellow card) 39'; Lieder 50' | Report | Kaalund (yellow card) 53'; Thordarson (yellow card) 66'; Røjkjær 82' | Stadium: Nature Energy Park; Attendance: 6,489; Referee: Jonas Hansen |

| 21 August 2021 6 | Odense | 2–2 | Brøndby | Odense |
| 18:00 CEST | Sabbi 55'; Lieder 84' | Report | Uhre 4', 43'; Bruus (yellow card) 53'; Tshiembe (yellow card) 70' | Stadium: Nature Energy Park; Attendance: 10,694; Referee: Jørgen Daugbjerg Burchardt |

| 29 August 2021 7 | Aarhus | 2–2 | Odense | Aarhus |
| 18:00 CEST | Kahl 3', 16'; Thorsteinsson (yellow card) 7'; Brandhof (yellow card) 26'; Poulsen (yellow card) 34'; Lund (yellow card) 75'; Grønbæk (yellow card) 81' | Report | Juel 1'; Thándarsson (yellow card) 7'; Sabbi (yellow card) 18'; Frøkjær-Jensen (yellow card) 35'; Jebali (yellow card) 65'; Opondo 90+1'; Okosun (yellow card) 90+5' | Stadium: Ceres Park; Attendance: 10,322; Referee: Morten Krogh |

| 13 September 2021 8 | Odense | 2–1 | SønderjyskE | Odense |
| 19:00 CEST | Skjelvik 29'; Frøkjær-Jensen 38'; Bernat (yellow card) 90+1' | Report | Kornvig (yellow card) 16'; Prosser 43'; Ekani (yellow card) 60'; Holm (yellow card) 70' | Stadium: Nature Energy Park; Attendance: 5,701; Referee: Anders Poulsen |

| 17 September 2021 9 | Aalborg | 2–0 | Odense | Aalborg |
| 19:00 CEST | Ross (yellow card) 59'; Børsting (yellow card) 64'; Thelander 69', (yellow card) 90+3'; Hagelskjær (yellow card) 73', (goal) 83'; Ahlmann (yellow card) 90'; Ferreira (yellow card) 90+2' | Report | Thrándarson (yellow card) 26'; Tverskov (yellow card) 86'; Larsen (yellow card) 90+3' | Stadium: Aalborg Portland Park; Attendance: 8,123; Referee: Jens Maae |

| 26 September 2021 10 | Viborg | 1–1 | Odense | Viborg |
| 14:00 CEST | Lonwijk 6', (yellow card) 89'; Grot (yellow card) 73' | Report | Kløve (yellow card) 19'; Sabbi (yellow card) 27', (goal) 61' | Stadium: Energi Viborg Arena; Attendance: 3,963; Referee: Jakob Kehlet |

| 1 October 2021 11 | Odense | 6–0 | Vejle | Odense |
| 19:00 CEST | Fenger 1'; Frøkjær-Jensen 4', 24', (yellow card) 46'; Thomasen 7'; Sabbi (yellow card) 66'; Kløve 78'; Breum 81' | Report | Ezatolahi (yellow card) 38'; James (yellow card) 69'; Kolinger (yellow card) 87' | Stadium: Nature Energy Park; Attendance: 8,504; Referee: Jakob Sundberg |

| 17 October 2021 12 | Odense | 1–2 | Randers | Odense |
| 14:00 CEST | Frøkjær-Jensen 18'; Kadrii (yellow card) 32' | Report | Odey 56'; Hammershøy-Mistrati 83' | Stadium: Nature Energy Park; Attendance: 8,367; Referee: Aydin Uslu |

| 24 October 2021 13 | Silkeborg | 1–1 | Odense | Silkeborg |
| 14:00 CEST | Calisir (yellow card) 45+2'; Jørgensen 74', (yellow card) 80'; Sonne (yellow card) 90+1' | Report | Fenger 90+5' | Stadium: JYSK Park; Attendance: 3,662; Referee: Sandi Putros |

| 1 November 2021 14 | Odense | 0–0 | Aarhus | Odense |
| 19:00 CEST | Thomasen (yellow card) 89' | Report | Anderson (yellow card) 25' | Stadium: Nature Energy Park; Attendance: 7,789; Referee: Mikkel Redder |

| 7 November 2021 15 | Brøndby | 2–1 | Odense | Copenhagen |
| 14:00 CEST | Uhre 20'; Frendrup 90+1' | Report | Frøkjær-Jensen 8'; Mickelson (yellow card) 84' | Stadium: Brøndby Stadium; Attendance: 16,622; Referee: Jakob Kehlet |

| 19 November 2021 16 | Odense | 2–3 | Viborg | Odense |
| 19:00 CEST | Thrándarson (yellow card) 45+1'; Jebali 50', 77', (yellow card) 74' (yellow-red card) 83' | Report | Bech 18', (yellow card) 56'; Leemans (yellow card) 20'; S. Grønning 35'; Grønning (yellow card) 48'; Bonde (yellow card) 66'; Gordinho (yellow card) 70'; Putros (yellow card) 81' | Stadium: Nature Energy Park; Attendance: 5,873; Referee: Jakob Sundberg |

| 28 November 2021 17 | Odense | 2–0 | Nordsjælland | Odense |
| 14:00 CEST | Jebali 20'; Sabbi (yellow card) 35'; Fenger 90' | Report | Svensson (yellow card) 28'; Adingra (yellow card) 57' | Stadium: Nature Energy Park; Attendance: 5,258; Referee: Michael Tykgård |

| 20 February 2022 18 | Copenhagen | 2–0 | Odense | Copenhagen |
| 18:00 CEST | Biel 32'; Lerager (yellow card) 33'; Ankersen (yellow card) 36'; Babacar 75' | Report | | Stadium: Parken Stadium; Attendance: 26,255; Referee: Sandi Putros |

| 27 February 2022 19 | Odense | 2–2 | Midtjylland | Odense |
| 18:00 CEST | King (yellow card) 55'; Jebali 59', (yellow card) 90+2'; Sviatchenko 61' (o.g.); Okosun (yellow card) 77' | Report | Brumado 51'; Vágner Love 90+3' | Stadium: Nature Energy Park; Attendance: 8,792; Referee: Jørgen Daugbjerg Burchardt |

| 6 March 2022 20 | SønderjyskE | 2–2 | Odense | Haderslev |
| 14:00 CEST | Berggreen 47', 76'; Holm (yellow card) 64' | Report | Fenger 15'; Okosun (yellow card) 19'; Svendsen 28'; Thomasen (yellow card) 40'; Larsen (yellow card) 47' | Stadium: Sydbank Pokalen; Attendance: 2,673; Referee: Aydin Uslu |

| 14 March 2022 21 | Odense | 2–3 | Aalborg | Odense |
| 19:00 CEST | Jebali 15'; Fenger 53' | Report | Høgh 3'; Thelander (yellow card) 8'; Højholt (yellow card) 39'; Makarić 62'; Kusk 77'; Pallesen (yellow card) 81' | Stadium: Nature Energy Park; Attendance: 6,153; Referee: Jakob Sundberg |

| 20 March 2022 22 | Vejle | 2–0 | Odense | Vejle |
| 14:30 CEST | Ponce (yellow card) 4'; Mucolli 5'; Hetemi (yellow card) 9'; Albornoz 41' | Report | Ivančević (yellow card) 40'; Tverskov (yellow card) 40'; Frøkjær-Jensen (yellow card) 90+3' | Stadium: Vejle Stadium; Attendance: 4,826; Referee: Morten Krogh |

==== Relegation round ====
| Pos | Team | Pld | W | D | L | GF | GA | GD | Pts | Qualification or relegation | VIB | ODE | NOR | AGF | VEJ | SON |
|---|---|---|---|---|---|---|---|---|---|---|---|---|---|---|---|---|
| 1 | Viborg (O) | 32 | 10 | 14 | 8 | 45 | 43 | +2 | 44 | Qualification for the European play-off match | — | 1–1 | 1–1 | 1–0 | 2–2 | 1–0 |
| 2 | OB | 32 | 8 | 14 | 10 | 45 | 46 | −1 | 38 | | 1–1 | — | 2–1 | 1–0 | 2–1 | 1–1 |
| 3 | Nordsjælland | 32 | 8 | 12 | 12 | 38 | 47 | −9 | 36 | | 2–0 | 1–1 | — | 2–2 | 2–1 | 2–0 |
| 4 | AGF | 32 | 6 | 12 | 14 | 31 | 43 | −12 | 30 | | 0–2 | 1–2 | 2–2 | — | 0–0 | 1–1 |
| 5 | Vejle (R) | 32 | 7 | 8 | 17 | 31 | 60 | −29 | 29 | Relegation to Danish 1st Division | 2–2 | 2–1 | 0–0 | 1–0 | — | 0–3 |

Source: Danish Football Association (in Danish), Soccerway
Legend: Blue = home team win; Yellow = draw; Red = away team win.
Rules for classification: 1) Points; 2) Goal difference; 3) Goals scored; 4) Away goals scored; 5) Play-off (played on neutral ground if determining teams for different rounds); 6) Draw.
(O) Play-off winners; (R) Relegated

| 3 April 2022 23 | Odense | 2–1 | Nordsjælland | Odense |
| 14:00 CEST | Breum 32', 53'; Okosun (yellow card) 74'; Thomasen (yellow card) 87' | Report | Adingra 67'; Coulibaly (yellow card) 85' | Stadium: Nature Energy Park; Attendance: 4,545; Referee: Mads-Kristoffer Kristoffersen |

| 10 April 2022 24 | SønderjyskE | 2–2 | Odense | Haderslev |
| 14:00 CEST | Berggreen 35', 53'; Christiansen (yellow card) 77'; Tchamba (yellow card) 24' | Report | Thrándarson (yellow card) 4'; Mickelson (yellow card) 24'; Fenger 42'; Skjelvik 80' | Stadium: Sydbank Park; Attendance: 2,462; Referee: Peter Kjærsgaard-Andersen |

| 14 April 2022 25 | Odense | 2–1 | Vejle | Odense |
| 14:00 CEST | Kløve (yellow card) 38'; Sabbi (yellow card) 40'; Svendsen 48', 90' | Report | Drammeh (yellow card) 58'; Mølgaard 69' | Stadium: Nature Energy Park; Attendance: 6,195; Referee: Jakob Sundberg |

| 17 April 2022 26 | Viborg | 1–1 | Odense | Haderslev |
| 18:00 CEST | Grot 7'; Lauritsen (yellow card) 24'; Bech (yellow card) 39' | Report | Jebali 68'; Tverskov (yellow card) 75' | Stadium: Energi Viborg Arena; Attendance: 3,857; Referee: Aydin Uslu |

| 24 April 2022 27 | Aarhus | 1–2 | Odense | Aarhus |
| 18:00 CEST | Kurminowski 3'; Brandhof (yellow card) 11'; Wilshere (yellow card) 79'; Daghim (yellow card) 90' | Report | Svendsen 58'; Jebali 90+4' (pen.) | Stadium: Ceres Park; Attendance: 6,587; Referee: Morten Krogh |

| 1 May 2022 28 | Odense | 1–0 | Aarhus | Odense |
| 14:00 CEST | Breum 6' | Report | | Stadium: Nature Energy Park; Attendance: 9,566; Referee: Jens Maae |

| 8 May 2022 29 | Nordsjælland | 1–1 | Odense | Farum |
| 14:00 CEST | Frese (yellow card) 50'; Andersen (yellow card) 64'; Villadsen (yellow card) 66'; Schjelderup 86' | Report | Ivančević (yellow card) 29'; Jebali 90+2' | Stadium: Right to Dream Park; Attendance: 3,523; Referee: Jørgen Daugbjerg-Burchardt |

| 12 May 2022 30 | Odense | 1–1 | Viborg | Odense |
| 18:00 CEST | Jebali 43' (pen.); Larsen (yellow card) 89' | Report | Grot 41' | Stadium: Nature Energy Park; Attendance: 6,786; Referee: Mikkel Redder |

| 15 May 2022 31 | Odense | 1–1 | SønderjyskE | Odense |
| 14:00 CEST | Sabbi 62' (pen.); Skjelvik (yellow card) 75' | Report | Frederiksen 3'; Gartenmann (yellow card) 23' | Stadium: Nature Energy Park; Attendance: 6,491; Referee: Anders Poulsen |

| 21 May 2022 32 | Vejle | 2–1 | Odense | Vejle |
| 17:00 CEST | Đorđević 78'; Elvius 86' | Report | Frøkjær-Jensen 25'; Larsen (yellow card) 49' | Stadium: Vejle Stadium; Attendance: 3,631; Referee: Mads-Kristoffer Kristoffersen |

=== Danish Cup ===
| 1 September 2021 Second round | Roskilde | 1–2 | Odense | Odense |
| 18:00 CEST | Mortensen (yellow card) 59'; Noer (yellow card) 64'; Elvang 90+3' | Report | Kløve 35'; Lieder (yellow card) 73'; Kadrii 90' | Stadium: Nature Energy Park; Attendance: 2,224; Referee: Peter Kjærsgaard |

| 21 September 2021 Third round | Helsingør | 0–3 | Odense | Helsingør |
| 17:45 CEST | Norouzi (yellow card) 88' | Report | Sabbi 11', (yellow card) 25'; Larsen 19'; Fenger 22'; Tverskov (yellow card) 78' | Stadium: Helsingør Stadium; Referee: Jonas Hansen |

| 27 October 2021 Fourth round | Nordsjælland | 1–4 (a.e.t.) | Odense | Farum |
| 18:00 CEST | Antman 13'; Frese (yellow card) 15'; Nagalo (yellow card) 32' (yellow-red card) 35'; Coulibaly (yellow card) 88'; Ogura (yellow card) 91' | Report | Kløve (yellow card) 70'; Thrándarson 88'; Lieder 98', 113'; Sabbi 102' | Stadium: Right to Dream Park; Attendance: 800; Referee: Jakob Sundberg |

| 5 December 2021 Quarter-final 1st leg | Randers | 0–2 | Odense | Randers |
| 18:00 CEST | Brock-Madsen (yellow card) 85' | Report | Kadrii 9'; Skjelvik (yellow card) 19'; Frøkjær-Jensen 40'; Sabbi (yellow card) 48'; Juel (yellow card) 51' | Stadium: Cepheus Park Randers; Attendance: 3,733; Referee: Morten Krogh |

| 12 December 2021 Quarter-final 2nd leg | Odense | 1–2 (3–2 agg.) | Randers | Odense |
| 19:30 CEST | Sabbi 71' | Report | Hammershøy-Mistrati (yellow card) 5', (goal) 73'; Piesinger (yellow card) 39'; Bundgaard 43'; Kamara (yellow card) 54' | Stadium: Nature Energy Park; Attendance: 7,260; Referee: Jakob Kehlet |

| 27 April 2022 Semi-final 1st leg | SønderjyskE | 1–2 | Odense | Haderslev |
| 18:00 CEST | Thomsen (yellow card) 46'; Christiansen 51'; Sanneh (yellow card) 55'; Frederiksen (yellow card) 65'; Dal Hende (yellow card) 78'; Kornvig (yellow card) 90+3'; Hassan (yellow card) 90+6' | Report | Fenger 44', (yellow card) 48'; Ivančević (yellow card) 55'; Kløve 83'; Sabbi (yellow card) 90+4' | Stadium: Sydbank Park; Attendance: 3,772; Referee: Jørgen Daugbjerg Burchardt |

| 5 May 2022 Semi-final 2nd leg | Odense | 3–0 (5–1 agg.) | SønderjyskE | Odense |
| 18:00 CEST | Jebali 2'; Sabbi 22'; Frøkjær-Jensen 45' | Report | | Stadium: Nature Energy Park; Attendance: 12,295; Referee: Morten Krogh |

| 26 May 2022 Final | Odense | 0–0 (a.e.t.) (3–4 p) | Midtjylland | Copenhagen |
| 18:00 CEST | Ivančević (yellow card) 48' | Report | Onyedika (yellow card) 67'; Thychosen (yellow card) 72'; Dreyer (yellow card) 105+3' | Stadium: Brøndby Stadium; Attendance: 23,328; Referee: Sandi Putros |
| | Penalties |
| | Thomasen (penalty scored); Okosun (penalty missed); Jebali (penalty scored); Kadrii (penalty scored); Larsen (penalty missed) | | (penalty scored) Dreyer; (penalty missed) Sviatchenko; (penalty scored) Sisto; (penalty scored) Onyedika; (penalty scored) Evander |

== Squad statistics ==
=== Goalscorers ===
Includes all competitive matches. The list is sorted by shirt number when total goals are equal.

As of match played 21 May 2022

| Rank | Pos. | No. | Player | Superliga | Danish Cup | Total |
|---|---|---|---|---|---|---|
| 1 | FW | 7 | Issam Jebali | 10 | 1 | 11 |
| 2 | FW | 15 | Max Fenger | 6 | 2 | 8 |
| 3 | MF | 29 | Mads Frøkjær-Jensen | 6 | 2 | 8 |
| 4 | FW | 11 | Emmanuel Sabbi | 3 | 4 | 7 |
| 5 | MF | 8 | Jakob Breum | 4 | 0 | 4 |
| 5 | FW | 10 | Sander Svendsen | 4 | 0 | 4 |
| 5 | FW | — | Mart Lieder | 2 | 2 | 4 |
| 8 | FW | 9 | Bashkim Kadrii | 1 | 2 | 3 |
| 8 | MF | 23 | Troels Kløve | 1 | 2 | 3 |
| 10 | MF | 14 | Jens Jakob Thomasen | 2 | 0 | 2 |
| 10 | DF | 16 | Jørgen Skjelvik | 2 | 0 | 2 |
| 12 | DF | 3 | Alexander Juel Andersen | 1 | 0 | 1 |
| 12 | DF | 5 | Kasper Larsen | 1 | 0 | 1 |
| 12 | MF | 19 | Aron Elís Thrándarson | 0 | 1 | 1 |
| 12 | MF | — | Moses Opondo | 1 | 0 | 1 |
| Own goals | | | | 1 | 0 | 0 |
| TOTALS | | | | 45 | 17 | 62 |

== Club awards ==
=== Player of the Month award ===
Awarded monthly to the player that was chosen by fans voting on OB's fan app.

| Month | Player | Ref. |
|---|---|---|
| August | (United States) Emmanuel Sabbi | |
| September | (United States) Emmanuel Sabbi | |
| October | (Iceland) Aron Thrándarson | |
| November | (Tunisia) Issam Jebali | |
| February | (Denmark) Ayo Simon Okosun | |
| March | (Denmark) Ayo Simon Okosun | |
| April | (Norway) Sander Svendsen | |
| May | (Tunisia) Issam Jebali | |
