= 2020–21 Odense Boldklub season =

Odense Boldklub
2020–21 season
- Chairman: Niels Thorborg
- Manager: Jakob Michelsen (until 15 March 2021); Michael Hemmingsen (from 15 March 2021)
- Stadium: Nature Energy Park
- Danish Superliga: 9th
- Danish Cup: Quarter-finals
- Top goalscorer: League: Issam Jebali (10 goals); All: Issam Jebali (11 goals)
Home colours	Away colours

The 2020–21 Odense Boldklub season is the club's 132nd season, and their 59th appearance in the Danish Superliga. As well as the Superliga, the side also competed in Danish Cup, being eliminated by Midtjylland at the quarter-final stage.

== First team ==
Last updated on 29 April 2021

Squad no.	Name	Nationality	Position	Date of birth (age)
Goalkeepers
13	Hans Christian Bernat	(Denmark)	GK	13 November 2000 (aged 20)
27	Oliver Christensen	(Denmark)	GK	22 March 1999 (aged 22)
30	Sayouba Mandé	(Ivory Coast)	GK	15 June 1993 (aged 27)
Defenders
2	Oliver Lund	(Denmark)	CB/LB/RB	21 August 1990 (aged 30)
3	Alexander Juel Andersen	(Denmark)	CB/RB	29 January 1991 (aged 30)
4	Ryan Johnson Laursen	(Denmark)	RB	14 April 1992 (aged 29)
5	Kasper Larsen	(Denmark)	CB	25 January 1993 (aged 28)
6	Jeppe Tverskov (vice-captain)	(Denmark)	CB	12 March 1993 (aged 28)
16	Jørgen Skjelvik	(Norway)	LB	5 July 1991 (aged 29)
24	Robin Østrøm	(Denmark)	CB	9 August 2002 (aged 18)
28	Christian Vestergaard	(Denmark)	CB	26 April 2001 (aged 20)
Midfielders
8	Janus Drachmann (captain)	(Denmark)	CM	11 May 1988 (aged 33)
14	Jens Jakob Thomasen	(Denmark)	CM/AM	25 May 1996 (aged 25)
19	Aron Elís Thrándarson	(Iceland)	AM/CM	10 November 1994 (aged 26)
20	Ayo Simon Okosun	(Denmark)	CM	21 July 1993 (aged 27)
21	Tarik Ibrahimagic	(Denmark)	CM	23 June 2001 (aged 19)
23	Troels Kløve	(Denmark)	LM/CM	23 October 1990 (aged 30)
25	Moses Opondo	(Uganda)	CM/AM/RM	28 October 1997 (aged 23)
29	Mads Frøkjær-Jensen	(Denmark)	LM/CM	29 July 1999 (aged 21)
Forwards
7	Issam Jebali	(Tunisia)	ST	25 December 1991 (aged 29)
9	Mart Lieder	(Netherlands)	ST	1 May 1990 (aged 31)
11	Emmanuel Sabbi	(United States)	ST/LW/RW	24 December 1997 (aged 23)
12	Bashkim Kadrii	(Denmark)	ST	9 July 1991 (aged 29)
15	Max Fenger	(Denmark)	ST	7 August 2001 (aged 19)
17	Sveinn Gudjohnsen	(Iceland)	ST	12 May 1998 (aged 23)
18	Rasmus Nissen	(Denmark)	ST/RM	25 June 2001 (aged 19)
26	Mikkel Hyllegaard	(Denmark)	ST	16 May 1999 (aged 22)

== Transfers and loans ==
=== In ===
Entry date	Position	No.	Player	From club	Fee	Ref.
1 August 2020	FW	15	(Denmark) Max Fenger	Youth academy		
1 August 2020	MF	21	(Denmark) Tarik Ibrahimagic	Youth academy		
1 August 2020	FW	18	(Denmark) Rasmus Nissen	Youth academy		
1 August 2020	FW	11	(United States) Emmanuel Sabbi	(Denmark) Hobro	Free transfer	
1 August 2020	DF	28	(Denmark) Christian Vestergaard	Youth academy		
5 October 2020	MF	20	(Denmark) Ayo Simon Okosun	(Denmark) Midtjylland		
31 December 2020	FW	10	(Norway) Sander Svendsen	(Norway) Brann	Return from loan	
7 January 2021	DF	16	(Denmark) Jørgen Skjelvik	(United States) LA Galaxy		
9 February 2021	FW	12	(Denmark) Bashkim Kadrii	Free agent	Free transfer	
Total						

=== Loans in ===
Start date	End date	Position	No.	Player	From club	Ref
13 September 2020	End of season	FW	17	(Iceland) Sveinn Gudjohnsen	(Italy) Spezia	

=== Loans out ===
Start date	End date	Position	No.	Player	To club	Ref
8 October 2020	31 December 2020	FW	10	(Norway) Sander Svendsen	(Norway) Brann	
22 January 2021	30 June 2021	DF	22	(Denmark) Daniel Obbekjær	(Italy) S.P.A.L.	
19 April 2021	17 August 2021	FW	10	(Norway) Sander Svendsen	(Norway) Odds	

=== New contracts ===
Date	Pos	No.	Player	Ref.
4 October 2020	MF	23	(Denmark) Troels Kløve	
23 March 2021	FW	7	(Tunisia) Issam Jebali	
29 April 2021	DF	24	(Denmark) Robin Østrøm	

== Friendlies ==
=== Pre-season ===
27 August 2020 Friendly	Odense (Denmark)	1–2	(Denmark) Horsens	Odense, Denmark
11:00 CEST	Hyllegaard 21'	Report	Brock-Madsen 7'; Prip (yellow card) 26'; Tengstedt 64', (yellow card) 89'	Stadium: Ådalen; Attendance: 0

31 August 2020 Friendly	Odense (Denmark)	1–2	(Denmark) Brøndby	Odense, Denmark
15:00 CEST	Hyllegaard 21'	Report	Uhre 61'; Vigen 77'	Stadium: Nature Energy Park

4 September 2020 Friendly	Aalborg (Denmark)	2–1	(Denmark) Odense	Aalborg, Denmark
15:00 CEST	van Weert 48'; Prica 62'	Report	Sabbi 2'	Stadium: AaB's anlæg

7 September 2020 Friendly	Odense (Denmark)	2–2	(Denmark) Midtjylland	Slagelse, Denmark
19:15 CEST	Heiselberg 50'; Christensen 89'	Report	Svendsen 60'; Roche 78'	Stadium: Slagelse Stadium

== Competitions ==
=== Superliga ===
==== League table ====
Pos	Team	Pld	W	D	L	GF	GA	GD	Pts	Qualification
6	Nordsjælland	22	7	8	7	35	30	+5	29	Qualification for the Championship round
7	SønderjyskE	22	8	4	10	30	32	−2	28	Qualification for the Relegation round
8	OB	22	7	7	8	25	28	−3	28	Qualification for the Relegation round
9	AaB	22	7	7	8	24	30	−6	28	Qualification for the Relegation round
10	Vejle	22	6	6	10	25	37	−12	24	Qualification for the Relegation round

Source: Danish Football Association (in Danish), Soccerway
Rules for classification: 1) Points; 2) Goal difference; 3) Goals scored; 4) Away goals scored; 5) Play-off (played on neutral ground if determining teams for different rounds); 6) Draw.

==== Results summary ====
Overall								Home						Away					
Pld	W	D	L	GF	GA	GD	Pts	W	D	L	GF	GA	GD	W	D	L	GF	GA	GD
22	7	7	8	25	28	−3	28	4	4	3	11	12	−1	3	3	5	14	16	−2

Last updated: 21 March 2021.
Source: FBref

==== Results by round ====
Matchday	1	2	3	4	5	6	7	8	9	10	11	12	13	14	15	16	17	18	19	20	21	22
Ground	H	H	A	H	A	A	H	A	H	A	H	H	A	H	A	H	A	H	A	A	H	A
Result	W	D	L	L	L	W	W	L	D	L	W	D	D	L	W	D	D	W	D	L	L	W
Position	4	4	9	10	10	8	9	8	8	10	9	9	9	9	8	8	7	6	6	6	9	8

Updated to match(es) played on 21 March 2021. Source:
A = Away; H = Home; W = Win; D = Draw; L = Loss

==== Matches ====
13 September 2020 1	Odense	3–2	Copenhagen	Odense
18:00 CEST	Thomasen 10'; Jebali 17', 45'; Sabbi (yellow card) 51'	Report	Wilczek 61', 70', (yellow card) 78'; Kaufmann (yellow card) 62'	Stadium: Nature Energy Park; Attendance: 4,315; Referee: Jakob Kehlet

20 September 2020 2	Odense	1–1	Nordsjælland	Odense
14:00 CEST	O. Lund (yellow card) 33'; Frøkjær-Jensen (yellow card) 41'; Sabbi 57'	Report	Atanga 55'; Frese (yellow card) 72'; Jenssen (yellow card) 90+3'; Thychosen (yellow card) 90+5'; Chukwuani (yellow card) 90+9'	Stadium: Nature Energy Park; Attendance: 300; Referee: Jonas Hansen

27 September 2020 3	Aarhus	4–2	Odense	Aarhus
14:00 CEST	Grønbæk 4'; Blume 15'; Thorsteinsson (yellow card) 43'; Mortensen 71'; Højer 80'	Report	Tverskov (yellow card) 6'; Jebali 9', 74'; O. Lund (yellow card) 23'	Stadium: Ceres Park; Attendance: 300; Referee: Jens Grabski Maae

4 October 2020 4	Odense	0–1	Vejle	Odense
14:00 CEST	Jebali (red card) 22'	Report	Dwamena (yellow card) 31'; Ojala (yellow card) 45+3'; Schoop (yellow card) 71'; Henrique (yellow card) 81'; Milošević (yellow card) 86'; Greve 86'	Stadium: Nature Energy Park; Attendance: 300; Referee: Jakob Sundberg

17 October 2020 5	Midtjylland	3–1	Odense	Herning
14:00 CEST	Kaba 67'; Dreyer 81'; Sisto 86'	Report	Sabbi 26'	Stadium: MCH Arena; Attendance: Morten Krogh; Referee: 300

23 October 2020 6	Lyngby	0–3	Odense	Kongens Lyngby
19:00 CEST	Hamalainen (yellow card) 46'	Report	Tverskov 7', 49'; Sabbi (yellow card) 14'; Okosun 31', (yellow card) 33'	Stadium: Lyngby Stadium; Attendance: 300; Referee: Jonas Hansen

1 November 2020 7	Odense	1–0	Horsens	Odense
14:00 CEST	Sabbi 11'; Kløve (yellow card) 47'	Report	Finnbogason (red card) 58'; Brajanic (yellow card) 89'	Stadium: Nature Energy Park; Attendance: 300; Referee: Jens Grabski Maae

8 November 2020 8	Brøndby	3–1	Odense	Copenhagen
16:00 CEST	Riveros 20'; Pavlović 47'; Lindstrøm 55'; Maxsø (yellow card) 62'	Report	Laursen (yellow card) 70'; Fenger 90+5'	Stadium: Brøndby Stadium; Attendance: 300; Referee: Sandi Putros

22 November 2020 9	Odense	1–1	SønderjyskE	Odense
14:00 CEST	Skjelvik (yellow card) 49'; Thomasen 83'; Gudjohnsen (yellow card) 87'	Report	Bah (yellow card) 86'; Tverskov 90+2' (o.g.)	Stadium: Nature Energy Park; Attendance: 300; Referee: Jakob Kehlet

27 November 2020 10	Randers	2–1	Odense	Randers
19:00 CEST	Kamara 35'; Lauenborg 55'; Rømer (yellow card) 90+7'	Report	O. Lund 82'; Larsen (yellow card) 90+7'; Gudjohnsen (yellow card) 90+7'	Stadium: Cepheus Park Randers; Attendance: 250; Referee: Aydin Uslu

4 December 2020 11	Odense	2–1	Aalborg	Odense
19:00 CEST	Okosun (yellow card) 40'; Laursen (yellow card) 55'; M. Lund (yellow card) 77'; Gudjohnsen 79'; O. Lund (yellow card) 86'; Hyllegaard 87'	Report	Ahlmann 41'; Ross (yellow card) 63'	Stadium: Nature Energy Park; Attendance: 300; Referee: Jens Grabski Maae

14 December 2020 12	Odense	1–1	Midtjylland	Odense
19:00 CEST	Opondo 14', (yellow card) 45+3'; Drachmann (yellow card) 63'	Report	Anderson (yellow card) 63'; Kaba 67'; Isaksen (yellow card) 84'	Stadium: Nature Energy Park; Attendance: 300; Referee: Sandi Putros

20 December 2020 13	Copenhagen	1–1	Odense	Copenhagen
18:00 CEST	Pep Biel 27'; Zanka (yellow card) 85'	Report	Kløve 63'; M. Lund (yellow card) 70'; Lieder (yellow card) 90'	Stadium: Telia Parken; Attendance: 250; Referee: Jens Grabski Maae

3 February 2021 14	Odense	0–1	Lyngby	Odense
18:00 CEST	Andersen (yellow card) 38'; Sabbi (yellow card) 48' (yellow-red card) 68'; Tverskov (yellow card) 68'	Report	Gregor (yellow card) 25'; Tshiembe (yellow card) 33'; Gammelby (yellow card) 48'; Hebo (yellow card) 48'; Jakobsen 83'; Rømer (yellow card) 84'	Stadium: Nature Energy Park; Attendance: 0 Referee: Mikkel Redder

7 February 2021 15	Nordsjælland	0–2	Odense	Farum
14:00 CEST		Report	Tverskov 6'; Hyllegaard 75'	Stadium: Right to Dream Park; Attendance: 0 Referee: Jens Grabski Maae

14 February 2021 16	Odense	0–0	Aarhus	Odense
20:00 CEST	Thomasen (yellow card) 90+1'; Tverskov (yellow card) 90+4'	Report	Munksgaard (yellow card) 37'; Poulsen (yellow card) 43'; Hvidt (yellow card) 72'; Højer (yellow card) 90+3'	Stadium: Nature Energy Park; Attendance: 0 Referee: Peter Kjærsgaard-Andersen

21 February 2021 17	Horsens	0–0	Odense	Horsens
14:00 CEST	Hlynsson (yellow card) 87'	Report	Laursen (yellow card) 60'	Stadium: CASA Arena Horsens; Attendance: 0 Referee: Jens Grabski Maae

28 February 2021 18	Odense	2–1	Randers	Odense
14:00 CEST	Sabbi 45+3'; Lieder 58'; Laursen (yellow card) 77'; Kløve (yellow card) 79'; Christensen (yellow card) 87'	Report	Kamara 23'; Kehinde (yellow card) 45+2'; Høgh (yellow card) 59'; Egho (yellow card) 80'	Stadium: Nature Energy Park; Attendance: 0 Referee: Jonas Hansen

4 March 2021 19	SønderjyskE	1–1	Odense	Haderslev
18:00 CEST	Vinderslev (yellow card) 30'; Dal Hende 53'; Thomas (yellow card) 89'; Eskesen (yellow card) 90+5'	Report	Jebali 78'	Stadium: Sydbank Park; Attendance: 0 Referee: Mikkel Redder

7 March 2021 20	Vejle	2–0	Odense	Vejle
20:00 CEST	Mucolli (yellow card) 49'; Sousa 60', (yellow card) 63'; Yamga (yellow card) 75'; Brunst (yellow card) 83'; Onugkha 89'	Report	Okosun (yellow card) 68'	Stadium: Vejle Stadium; Attendance: 0 Referee: Sandi Putros

14 March 2021 21	Odense	0–3	Brøndby	Odense
16:00 CEST	Drachmann (yellow card) 38'	Report	Uhre 20', 35', 39'	Stadium: Nature Energy Park; Attendance: 0 Referee: Morten Krogh

21 March 2021 22	Aalborg	0–2	Odense	Aalborg
17:00 CEST	van Weert (yellow card) 60'	Report	Thrandarson 14'; Sabbi (yellow card) 35'; Jebali 56'; Frøkjær-Jensen (yellow card) 57'	Stadium: Aalborg Portland Park; Attendance: 0 Referee: Peter Kjærsgaard

==== Relegation round ====
Pos	Team	Pld	W	D	L	GF	GA	GD	Pts	Qualification or relegation	AAB	SON	ODE	VEJ	LYN	HOR
1	AaB	32	12	10	10	44	41	+3	46	Qualification for the European play-off match	—	3–2	3–2	2–1	4–0	1–1
2	SønderjyskE	32	13	5	14	45	48	−3	44		0–4	—	2–0	1–0	2–0	2–3
3	OB	32	11	10	11	40	39	+1	43		1–0	1–1	—	0–1	2–0	4–0
4	Vejle	32	9	11	12	42	50	−8	38		1–1	4–2	2–2	—	2–2	3–0
5	Lyngby (R)	32	6	8	18	36	63	−27	26	Relegation to Danish 1st Division	2–2	0–1	1–2	0–0	—	3–4

Source: Danish Football Association (in Danish), Soccerway
Legend: Blue = home team win; Yellow = draw; Red = away team win.
Rules for classification: 1) Points; 2) Goal difference; 3) Goals scored; 4) Away goals scored; 5) Play-off (played on neutral ground if determining teams for different rounds); 6) Draw.
(R) Relegated

4 April 2021 23	Horsens	1–1	Odense	Horsens
16:00 CEST	Prip 33'	Report	Tverskov (yellow card) 20'; Frøkjær-Jensen (yellow card) 77'; Skjelvik (yellow card) 83'; Jebali 90'	Stadium: CASA Arena Horsens; Referee: Aydin Uslu

9 April 2021 24	Odense	0–1	Vejle	Odense
18:30 CEST	Okosun (yellow card) 40'; Skjelvik (yellow card) 51'; Frøkjær-Jensen (yellow card) 75'; Juel (yellow card) 90+5'	Report	Sousa (yellow card) 40', (goal) 67'; Brunst (yellow card) 90'	Stadium: Nature Energy Park; Attendance: 0 Referee: Anders Poulsen

18 April 2021 25	Odense	1–1	SønderjyskE	Odense
14:00 CEST	Kadrii 5'; Thrandarson (yellow card) 63'; Kadrii (yellow card) 82'; Tverskov (yellow card) 84'	Report	Schmiedl (yellow card) 36' (yellow-red card) 54'; Holm 67'	Stadium: Nature Energy Park; Attendance: 0 Referee: Peter Kjærsgaard

21 April 2021 26	Aalborg	3–2	Odense	Aalborg
19:00 CEST	van Weert 8'; Juel 55' (o.g.); Prica 87'; Granli (yellow card) 89'; Andersen (yellow card) 90+3'	Report	Okosun 66'; Skjelvik (yellow card) 76'; Juel 90+2'	Stadium: Aalborg Portland Park; Attendance: 2,400; Referee: Mikkel Redder

25 April 2021 27	Odense	2–0	Lyngby	Odense
18:00 CEST	Jebali 24' (pen.); Juel (yellow card) 76'; Kadrii 36'; O. Lund (yellow card) 76'	Report	Winther (yellow card) 85'	Stadium: Nature Energy Park; Attendance: 3,960; Referee: Jonas Hansen

2 May 2021 28	SønderjyskE	2–0	Odense	Haderslev
14:00 CEST	Holm 61'; Banggaard (yellow card) 75'; Frederiksen 90+4'	Report	Juel (yellow card) 85'; Thomasen (yellow card) 88'; Skjelvik (yellow card) 90+2'	Stadium: Sydbank Park; Attendance: 2,511; Referee: Jakob Kehlet

7 May 2021 29	Odense	1–0	Aalborg	Odense
19:00 CEST	Fenger (yellow card) 44'; Kadrii 45+1'; Mandé (yellow card) 90+6'	Report	Granli (yellow card) 89'	Stadium: Nature Energy Park; Attendance: 4,083; Referee: Mads-Kristoffer Kristoffersen

14 May 2021 30	Vejle	2–2	Odense	Vejle
19:00 CEST	Ekitike 13'; Ezatolahi 39'; Yamga (yellow card) 83'; Onugkha 83'	Report	Skjelvik 17'; Okosun (yellow card) 43'; Kadrii 84' (pen.); Thrandarson (yellow card) 90+1'; Østrøm (yellow card) 90+3'	Stadium: Vejle Stadium; Attendance: 3,817; Referee: Jørgen Daugbjerg Burchardt

20 May 2021 31	Lyngby	1–2	Odense	Kongens Lyngby
19:00 CEST	Hebo 70'; Rømer (yellow card) 77'	Report	Jebali 25'; Østrøm (yellow card) 33'; Sabbi 84'; O. Lund (yellow card) 90+1'	Stadium: Lyngby Stadium; Attendance: 2,114; Referee: Michael Tykgaard

24 May 2021 32	Odense	4–0	Horsens	Odense
14:00 CEST	Kadrii 35', 65'; Jebali 38'; Reese 74' (o.g.)	Report	Ludwig (yellow card) 57'	Stadium: Nature Energy Park; Attendance: 4,527; Referee: Mikkel Redder

=== Danish Cup ===
7 October 2020 Second round	Hillerød	1–2	Odense	Hillerød
16:00 CEST	Suhr 12'; Willumsen (yellow card) 81'	Report	Thrandarson 26'; Jebali 30'	Stadium: Hillerød Stadium; Referee: Benjamin Willaume-Jantzen

11 November 2020 Third round	Ballerup-Skovlunde	0–3	Odense	Ballerup
13:30 CEST	Zederkopff (yellow card) 14'; Kiilerich (yellow card) 29'; Woss (yellow card) 53'; Frandsen (yellow card) 70'	Report	Tverskov 12'; Skjelvik 38'; Kløve 67'; Østrøm (yellow card) 71'; Frøkjær-Jensen (yellow card) 90+2'	Stadium: Ballerup Idrætspark; Referee: Jakob Sundberg

9 December 2020 Fourth round	Nykøbing	0–3	Odense	Nykøbing Falster
16:30 CEST	Koch (yellow card) 73'	Report	Okosun (yellow card) 23'; Gudjohnsen 36'; Sabbi 39'; O. Lund (yellow card) 85'; Hyllegaard 90+1'	Stadium: CM Arena; Referee: Benjamin Willaume Jantzen

11 February 2021 Quarter-final 1st leg	Odense	1–2	Midtjylland	Odense
18:00 CEST	Opondo 32'; Hyllegaard (yellow card) 36'	Report	Isaksen (yellow card) 32', (goal) 50'; Pfeiffer 39'; Sery (yellow card) 84'	Stadium: Nature Energy Park; Attendance: 0 Referee: Sandi Putros

10 March 2021 Quarter-final 2nd leg	Midtjylland	3–0	Odense	Herning
16:30 CEST	Sery 45'; Isaksen 49'; Onyeka (yellow card) 57'; Vibe 76'	Report	Okosun (yellow card) 42'; Frøkjær-Jensen (yellow card) 71'; Gudjohnsen (yellow card) 77'; Sabbi (yellow card) 85'	Stadium: MCH Arena; Attendance: 0 Referee: Jørgen Daugbjerg Burchardt

== Squad statistics ==
=== Goalscorers ===
Includes all competitive matches. The list is sorted by shirt number when total goals are equal.

As of match played 24 May 2021

Rank	Pos.	No.	Player	Superliga	Danish Cup	Total
1	FW	7	Issam Jebali	10	1	11
2	FW	12	Bashkim Kadrii	6	0	6
2	FW	11	Emmanuel Sabbi	5	1	6
4	DF	6	Jeppe Tverskov	3	1	4
5	FW	26	Mikkel Hyllegaard	2	1	3
6	MF	14	Jens Jakob Thomasen	2	0	2
6	DF	16	Jørgen Skjelvik	1	1	2
6	FW	17	Sveinn Gudjohnsen	1	1	2
6	MF	19	Aron Elís Thrándarson	1	1	2
6	MF	20	Ayo Simon Okosun	2	0	2
6	MF	23	Troels Kløve	1	1	2
6	MF	25	Moses Opondo	1	1	2
13	DF	2	Oliver Lund	1	0	1
13	DF	3	Alexander Juel Andersen	1	0	1
13	FW	9	Mart Lieder	1	0	1
13	FW	15	Max Fenger	1	0	1
Own goals				1	0	1
TOTALS				40	9	49

=== Disciplinary record ===
As of match played 20 May 2021

No.	Pos.	Name	Superliga		Danish Cup		Total	
No.	Pos.	Name	Booked	Sent off (straight red)	Booked	Sent off (straight red)	Booked	Sent off (straight red)
11	FW	(United States) Emmanuel Sabbi	5	1	1	0	6	1
2	DF	(Denmark) Oliver Lund	5	0	1	0	6	0
29	MF	(Denmark) Mads Frøkjær-Jensen	4	0	2	0	6	0
6	DF	(Denmark) Jeppe Tverskov	5	0	0	0	5	0
16	DF	(Norway) Jørgen Skjelvik	5	0	0	0	5	0
3	DF	(Denmark) Alexander Juel Andersen	4	0	0	0	4	0
17	FW	(Iceland) Sveinn Gudjohnsen	2	0	1	0	3	0
20	MF	(Denmark) Ayo Simon Okosun	3	0	0	0	3	0
24	DF	(Denmark) Robin Østrøm	2	0	1	0	3	0
4	DF	(Denmark) Ryan Laursen	2	0	0	0	2	0
8	MF	(Denmark) Janus Drachmann	2	0	0	0	2	0
14	MF	(Denmark) Jens Jakob Thomasen	2	0	0	0	2	0
19	MF	(Iceland) Aron Elís Thrándarson	2	0	0	0	2	0
23	MF	(Denmark) Troels Kløve	2	0	0	0	2	0
—	DF	(Denmark) Marco Lund	2	0	0	0	2	0
7	FW	(Tunisia) Issam Jebali	0	1	0	0	0	1
5	DF	(Denmark) Kasper Larsen	1	0	0	0	1	0
9	FW	(Netherlands) Mart Lieder	1	0	0	0	1	0
12	FW	(Denmark) Bashkim Kadrii	1	0	0	0	1	0
15	FW	(Denmark) Max Fenger	1	0	0	0	1	0
25	MF	(Uganda) Moses Opondo	1	0	0	0	1	0
26	FW	(Denmark) Mikkel Hyllegaard	1	0	0	0	1	0
27	GK	(Denmark) Oliver Christensen	1	0	0	0	1	0
30	GK	(Ivory Coast) Sayouba Mandé	1	0	0	0	1	0
Total			59	2	8	0	67	2
