= Kaalund =

Kaalund is a surname. Notable people with the surname include:

- Bodil Kaalund (1930–2016), Danish painter, textile artist and writer
- Garrett Kaalund (born 2004), American sprinter
- Hans Vilhelm Kaalund (1818–1885), Danish lyric poet
- Mads Kaalund (born 1996), Danish footballer
