= Hans Christian Bernat =

Danish footballer (born 2000)

Personal information
- Date of birth: 13 November 2000 (age 25)
- Place of birth: Morud, Denmark
- Height: 1.92 m (6 ft 4 in)
- Position: Goalkeeper

Team information
- Current team: Karlsruher SC
- Number: 1

Youth career
- Morud IF
- 2012–201?: Næsby Boldklub
- 201?–2015: OB
- 2016: Nordsjælland
- 2016–2019: OB

Senior career*
Years	Team	Apps	(Gls)
2019–2024	OB	45	(0)
2024–2025	Botev Plovdiv	32	(0)
2025–	Karlsruher SC	33	(0)

International career
2015–2016	Denmark U16	4	(0)
2016–2017	Denmark U17	7	(0)
2017	Denmark U18	2	(0)
2018–2019	Denmark U19	7	(0)
- * Club domestic league appearances and goals as of 18 May 2026

Hans Christian Bernat (Danish pronunciation: [ˈhænˀs ˈkʰʁestjæn pæɐ̯ˈnæt, - ˈkʰʁæs-]; born 13 November 2000) is a Danish professional footballer who plays as a goalkeeper for 2. Bundesliga club Karlsruher SC.

== Early life ==
Bernat was born in Morud, a town on the island of Funen. His father, Robert Bernat, is a former goalkeeper who played for B 1909, Næsby Boldklub and Vejle Boldklub. He is of Polish descent through his father, whose parents fled to Denmark from Poland after World War II.

== Club career ==
=== OB ===
==== Early career ====
Bernat started his career for local clubs on Funen, Morud IF and Næsby Boldklub, before moving to the biggest club on the island, OB. He moved to the FC Nordsjælland academy in January 2016, but returned to OB after six months, where he signed a three-year youth contract. Bernat progressed through the youth system and went on a trials with two Premier League clubs; Brighton & Hove Albion in 2017 and Manchester United in August 2018. He eventually continued playing for OB, signing his first professional contract – a two-year deal – with the club on 16 March 2019, as he was also promoted to the first-team squad. Bernat signed another contract extension on 29 December 2019, keeping him part of the club until 2024.

==== First team ====
Bernat made his professional debut on 8 July 2020, the final game of the 2019–20 season, starting the game against Silkeborg. In the subsequent season, he served as a backup goalkeeper, making three appearances for the professional team in the league. However, during the 2021–22 season, he successfully claimed a consistent starting position from the seventh matchday onwards. Throughout the regular season and the relegation round combined, he played a total of 26 games.

Bernat lost his starting spot in the 2022–23 season, but returned to the starting lineup after Martin Hansen's injury in March 2023. In the following season, he assumed the role of a starter due to another injury to Hansen in October 2023. He showcased impressive performances during the fall period, but was benched again in the spring of 2024, after OB signed Viljar Myhra in January 2024. In April 2024, Bernat announced that he would not extend his expiring contract, and leave OB at the end of the season.

=== Botev Plovdiv ===
On 18 June 2024, media reported that Bernat successfully completed his medical and signed a two-year contract with Bulgarian First League club Botev Plovdiv, with an option for an additional season. The following day, his new club confirmed the move.

=== Karlsruher ===
On 2 July 2025, Bernat signed with Karlsruher SC in 2. Bundesliga.

== International career ==
Bernat has represented Denmark at youth international levels from under-16 to under-19.

== Career statistics ==
As of match played 8 May 2026

Appearances and goals by club, season and competition
Club	Season	League			National cup (Note: Includes Danish Cup, Bulgarian Cup, DFB-Pokal)		Europe		Other		Total	
Club	Season	Division	Apps	Goals	Apps	Goals	Apps	Goals	Apps	Goals	Apps	Goals
OB	2019–20	Danish Superliga	1	0	0	0	—		—		1	0
OB	2020–21	Danish Superliga	3	0	0	0	—		—		3	0
OB	2021–22	Danish Superliga	26	0	8	0	—		—		15	0
OB	2022–23	Danish Superliga	7	0	0	0	—		—		7	0
OB	2023–24	Danish Superliga	8	0	2	0	—		—		10	0
OB	Total		45	0	10	0	—		—		55	0
Botev Plovdiv	2024–25	Bulgarian First League	32	0	1	0	3 (Note: One appearance in UEFA Europa League, two appearances in UEFA Europa Conference League)	0	1	0	37	0
Karlsruher SC	2025–26	2. Bundesliga	32	0	2	0	—		—		34	0
Career total			109	0	13	0	3	0	1	0	126	0
