= Mads Frøkjær-Jensen =

Danish footballer (born 1999)

Mads Frøkjær
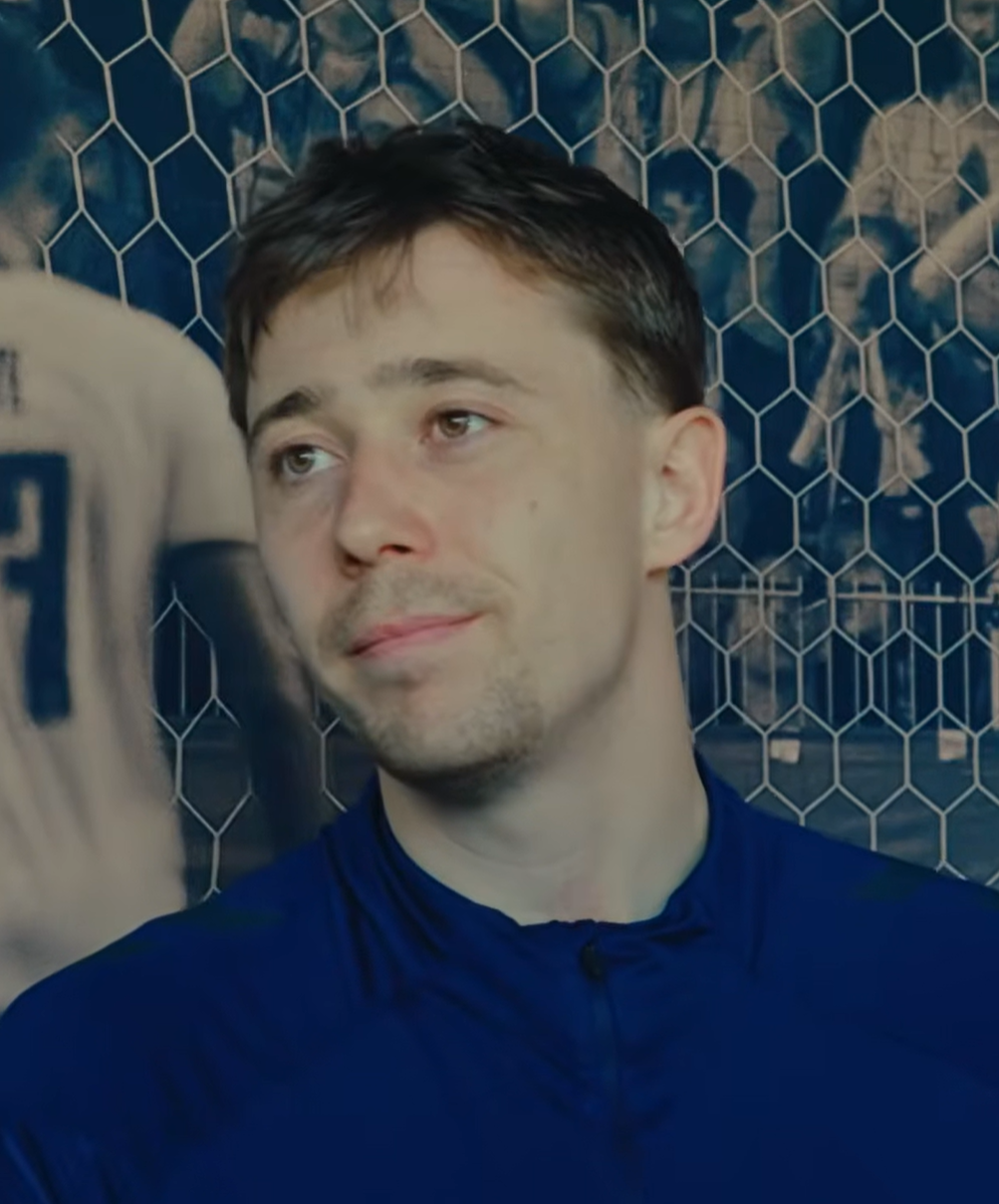
- Frøkjær in 2026

Personal information
- Date of birth: 29 July 1999 (age 27)
- Place of birth: Hvidovre, Denmark
- Height: 1.86 m (6 ft 1 in)
- Position: Attacking midfielder

Team information
- Current team: Brøndby
- Number: 29

Youth career
- Hvidovre
- Avedøre
- Rosenhøj
- Greve
- 2014–2018: OB

Senior career*
Years	Team	Apps	(Gls)
2018–2023	OB	117	(16)
2023–2026	Preston North End	97	(7)
2026–	Brøndby	26	(5)

International career
2020	Denmark U21	1	(0)
- * Club domestic league appearances and goals as of 08:59, 2 November 2026 (UTC)

Mads Frøkjær-Jensen (Danish pronunciation: [ˈmæs ˈfʁœˌkʰe(ː)ɐ̯ˀ ˈjensn̩]; born 29 July 1999) is a Danish professional footballer who plays as an attacking midfielder for Danish Superliga club Brøndby.

== Early life ==
Frøkjær-Jensen was born on 29 July 1999 in Hvidovre, a western suburb of Copenhagen. He grew up in a family of Brøndby IF supporters and attended matches at Brøndby Stadion from an early age. After playing his youth football at several clubs in the Vestegnen area, Frøkjær-Jensen was scouted by OB while attending Efterskolen ved Nyborg and joined the club's academy in 2014.

== Career ==
=== OB ===
On 19 December 2017, Frøkjær-Jensen signed a three-year professional contract active from the summer 2018, which also meant, that he would be promoted permanently to the first team squad. He made his official debut on 6 September 2018, Frøkjær-Jensen got his debut for the first team of OB in the Danish Cup. He started on the bench, before replacing Nicklas Helenius in the 73rd minute in a 4–0 victory against Akademisk Boldklub.

Frøkjær-Jensen made his Danish Superliga debut on 14 April 2019 against FC Midtjylland coming in from the bench with 17 minutes left. He played a total of five games for the first team in the 2018–19 season. On 24 January 2020, OB confirmed that Frøkjær-Jensen had signed a contract extension until the summer 2024.

=== Preston North End ===
On 11 July 2023, Frøkjær-Jensen signed for English Championship club Preston North End for an undisclosed fee on a four-year deal. Assigned the number 10 shirt, he was described by manager Ryan Lowe as "a ball-carrying number eight" who could operate "anywhere in those midfield areas".

Frøkjær-Jensen established himself in the Preston starting lineup across his debut 2023–24 Championship campaign, scoring his first goal for the club against Sunderland and adding further goals at Portman Road against Ipswich Town and in a home draw with Millwall; by February 2024 he had also accumulated five assists, including a through-ball for Will Keane in the first home match of the season and two in an away win at Cardiff City.

Lowe departed by mutual consent after the opening match of the 2024–25 season, with Paul Heckingbottom appointed as his permanent successor on 20 August 2024. Frøkjær-Jensen welcomed the transition as "fresh air for everybody", noting that Heckingbottom brought a more tactically detailed approach than his predecessor. He opened his account for the season with a first-time volley at Middlesbrough on 14 September, cancelling out Tommy Conway's opener to secure a 1–1 draw. A hamstring complaint picked up during the November international break curtailed his involvement in the latter part of the autumn, with Heckingbottom opting not to risk him for the away fixture at Stoke City. A further injury sustained during the defeat to Hull City in April 2025 ruled him out of the penultimate home fixture of the season against Plymouth Argyle.

Frøkjær-Jensen's playing time diminished considerably in the early months of the 2025–26 season, with Preston willing to sell given that he had little prospect of reclaiming a regular starting berth. He scored eight goals in 107 official appearances for Preston, before departing the club in late-January 2026.

=== Brøndby ===
On 31 January 2026, Brøndby signed Frøkjær-Jensen on a contract running until June 2029. According to Danish sports newspaper Tipsbladet, the transfer fee was approximately €1.25 million, with a further €250,000 in potential bonuses. Frøkjær-Jensen, who grew up in nearby Hvidovre and had supported Brøndby since childhood, was assigned the number 29 shirt. Football director Benjamin Schmedes framed the signing as a response to the sale of Noah Nartey to Lyon earlier in the window, describing Frøkjær-Jensen as an aggressively-minded and direct midfielder suited to the style Steve Cooper wished to implement.

He made his competitive debut in Brøndby's Danish Superliga spring-season opener, a goalless home draw against Randers on 8 February, though his early weeks proved difficult and he acknowledged in mid-March that his start had fallen short of expectations for both himself and the club. His form improved markedly in the championship round. On 17 April 2026, starting in a 6–0 home victory over Sønderjyske—Brøndby's first league win in eleven attempts—Frøkjær-Jensen provided two assists, setting up Jacob Ambæk's third goal to complete the youngest hat-trick in Superliga history and later releasing Shō Fukuda for the sixth. Substituted in the 73rd minute to applause from the home supporters, Frøkjær-Jensen told TV 2 Sport that the moment had been "a culmination of many emotions".

== Career statistics ==
As of match played 23 October 2026

Appearances and goals by club, season and competition
Club	Season	League			National cup (Note: Includes Danish Cup, FA Cup)		League cup (Note: Includes EFL Cup)		Other		Total	
Club	Season	Division	Apps	Goals	Apps	Goals	Apps	Goals	Apps	Goals	Apps	Goals
OB	2018–19	Danish Superliga	17	0	0	0	—		—		17	0
OB	2019–20	Danish Superliga	25	2	1	0	—		—		26	2
OB	2020–21	Danish Superliga	19	0	2	0	—		—		21	0
OB	2021–22	Danish Superliga	28	6	8	2	—		—		36	8
OB	2022–23	Danish Superliga	28	8	1	0	—		—		29	8
OB	Total		117	16	12	2	—		—		129	18
Preston North End	2023–24	Championship	41	3	0	0	1	0	—		42	3
Preston North End	2024–25	Championship	38	2	3	0	4	1	—		45	3
Preston North End	2025–26	Championship	18	2	1	0	1	0	—		20	2
Preston North End	Total		97	7	4	0	6	1	—		107	8
Brøndby	2025–26	Danish Superliga	13	0	0	0	—		1 (Note: Appearance in Danish Superliga play-off)	1	14	1
Brøndby	2026–27	Danish Superliga	12	4	1	0	—		—		13	4
Brøndby	Total		25	4	1	0	—		1	1	27	5
Career total			239	27	17	2	6	1	1	1	263	31

== Honours ==
OB

- Danish Cup runner-up: 2021–22
