= Emmanuel Sabbi =

American soccer player (born 1997)

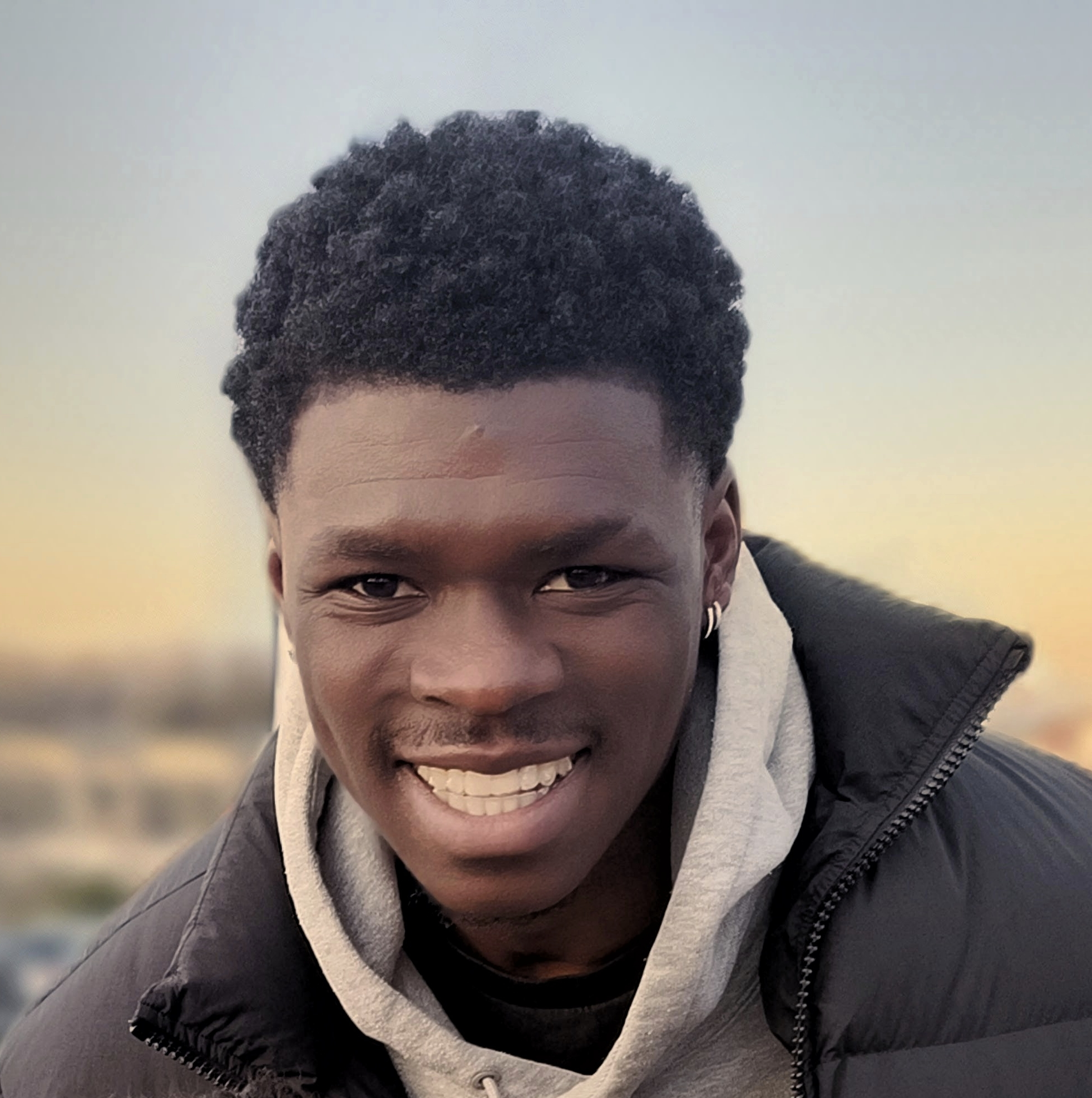

Personal information
- Full name: Emmanuel Afriyie Mario Sabbi
- Date of birth: December 24, 1997 (age 28)
- Place of birth: Schio, Vicenza, Italy
- Height: 1.79 m (5 ft 10 in)
- Position: Winger

Team information
- Current team: Vancouver Whitecaps FC
- Number: 11

Youth career
- Ohio Premier
- 2014–2016: Chicago Magic PSG
- 2016–2017: Las Palmas

Senior career*
Years	Team	Apps	(Gls)
2017–2020	Hobro	69	(13)
2020–2023	OB	78	(16)
2023–2025	Le Havre	45	(5)
2025–	Vancouver Whitecaps FC	38	(9)

International career^{‡}
2015	United States U18	10	(3)
2015–2017	United States U20	17	(4)
2019	United States U23	2	(0)
2023	United States	1	(0)
- * Club domestic league appearances and goals as of May 12, 2026 ‡ National team caps and goals as of January 28, 2023

Emmanuel Afriyie Mario Sabbi (born December 24, 1997) is a professional soccer player who plays as a winger for Major League Soccer club Vancouver Whitecaps FC. Born in Italy, he has played for the United States national team.

== Early life ==
Sabbi was born in Schio, Italy to Ghanaian parents. He grew up in the United States, however, and for the majority of his youth, he played for Ohio Premier Soccer Club in Columbus, Ohio. Ohio Premier became national finalists at the 2014 USYS National Championships in Maryland. Sabbi won the golden boot and was named most valuable player of the tournament. He then moved on to Chicago Magic PSG for a few years before signing a youth contract with Spanish side Las Palmas.

== Club career ==
Sabbi initially committed to play at the University of Akron but opted to sign a reserve contract with UD Las Palmas instead. After a year with Las Palmas, Sabbi signed a professional deal with newly promoted Hobro IK in Denmark. He made his professional debut as a sub in a loss to FC Midtjylland on September 17, 2017.

In January 2020, Sabbi agreed to a free transfer with Odense Boldklub at the end of the season. On August 10, 2023, it was confirmed, that newly promoted Ligue 1 club Le Havre had signed Sabbi on a deal until June 2027.

On February 11, 2025, Sabbi signed with Major League Soccer side Vancouver Whitecaps FC on a three-year deal through the 2027 season, with a club option for 2028. He scored his first goal with the Whitecaps in a 2–0 victory over Colorado Rapids on April 5, 2025.

== International career ==
Sabbi was eligible to represent Ghana, Italy, and the United States. He represented the United States at the 2017 FIFA U-20 World Cup, appearing in two games, cap-tying him to the United States.

== Career statistics ==
=== Club ===
As of December 31, 2025

Appearances and goals by club, season and competition
Club	Season	League			National cup		Continental cup		Other		Total	
Club	Season	Division	Apps	Goals	Apps	Goals	Apps	Goals	Apps	Goals	Apps	Goals
Hobro IK	2017–18	Superliga	9	0	3	0	–		8	1	20	1
Hobro IK	2018–19	Superliga	23	5	0	0	–		8	3	31	8
Hobro IK	2019–20	Superliga	23	6	1	0	–		6	1	29	7
Hobro IK	Total		55	11	4	0	–		22	5	81	16
Odense BK	2020–21	Superliga	29	5	0	0	–		–		29	5
Odense BK	2021–22	Superliga	30	3	8	4	–		–		38	7
Odense BK	2022–23	Superliga	19	8	0	0	–		–		19	8
Odense BK	Total		78	16	8	4	–		–		86	20
Le Havre	2023–24	Ligue 1	30	5	3	0	–		–		33	5
Le Havre	2024–25	Ligue 1	15	0	1	0	–		–		16	0
Le Havre	Total		45	5	4	0	–		–		49	5
Vancouver Whitecaps FC	2025	MLS	28	7	4 (Note: Appearances in Canadian Championship)	1	5 (Note: Appearances in CONCACAF Champions League)	0	5 (Note: Appearances in MLS Cup playoffs)	1	42	9
Vancouver Whitecaps FC	Total		28	7	4	1	5	0	5	1	42	9
Career total			206	39	20	5	5	0	27	6	258	50

=== International ===
As of match played January 28, 2023

Appearances and goals by national team and year
National team	Year	Apps	Goals
United States	2023	1	0
Total		1	0

== Honors ==
United States U20

- CONCACAF Under-20 Championship: 2017
