= Jeppe Tverskov =

Danish footballer (born 1993)

- Tverskov with San Diego FC in 2026

Personal information
- Full name: Jeppe Theis Tverskov
- Date of birth: 12 March 1993 (age 33)
- Place of birth: Copenhagen, Denmark
- Height: 1.85 m (6 ft 1 in)
- Position: Defensive midfielder

Team information
- Current team: San Diego FC
- Number: 6

Youth career
- 1996–2011: B 1903
- 2011–2012: Lyngby

Senior career*
Years	Team	Apps	(Gls)
2010–2011	B 1903	24	(7)
2012–2014	Lyngby	36	(1)
2014–2016	Randers	38	(3)
2016–2023	OB	210	(8)
2023–2024	Nordsjælland	47	(5)
2025–	San Diego FC	33	(2)
- * Club domestic league appearances and goals as of 22 October 2025

Jeppe Theis Tverskov (Danish pronunciation: [ˈtsʰveɐ̯ˌskʌwˀ]; born 12 March 1993) is a Danish professional footballer who plays as a defensive midfielder for Major League Soccer club San Diego FC.

== Career ==
=== B 1903 ===
Born in Copenhagen, Tverskov started playing football at the age of three at Boldklubben 1903 (B 1903). As a 17-year-old, he was promoted to the first senior team competing in the fourth-tier Denmark Series by the then manager Bent Christensen. In his first season, he made 24 appearances and seven goals, and was voted Player of the Year at the club.

=== Lyngby ===
In June 2011, Tverskov moved to Lyngby Boldklub on the recommendation of his manager, Bent Christensen. At that club, he played alongside fellow youngsters such as Yussuf Poulsen, Christian Nørgaard and Uffe Bech. In June 2012, he was promoted to the first-team by head coach Niels Frederiksen. Tverskov made his first professional appearance on 4 November 2012 against Hobro IK in the second-tier Danish 1st Division. He came on as a 90th-minute substitute for David Boysen, as his team won 2–1. He scored his first professional goal on 25 April 2014, during a 3–0 league victory for his team over Hvidovre IF.

=== Randers ===
On 30 June 2014, Tverskov joined Randers, where he signed a two-year contract. He played his first match for the club on 23 September in a Danish Cup match against Kolding Boldklub. He started the match as a defensive midfielder and stood out by also scoring his first goal for Randers, thereby participating in his team's 7–1 win. The club finished fourth in the Danish Superliga at the end of the 2014–15 season and managed to qualify for the qualifying rounds of the UEFA Europa League. Tverskov played his first European match in this competition, on 2 July 2015 against Andorran club UE Sant Julià. He appeared as a starter, but was however sent off after receiving a second yellow card, as Randers won 1–0.

=== OB ===
As his contract expired with Randers, Tverskov signed with Odense Boldklub (OB) in the summer of 2016, the transfer being announced on 20 April of the same year. He made his first appearance for the club on the first matchday of the 2016–17 Superligaen season, against SIlkeborg. That day, he started the match, which ended in a 0–0 draw.

=== Nordsjælland ===
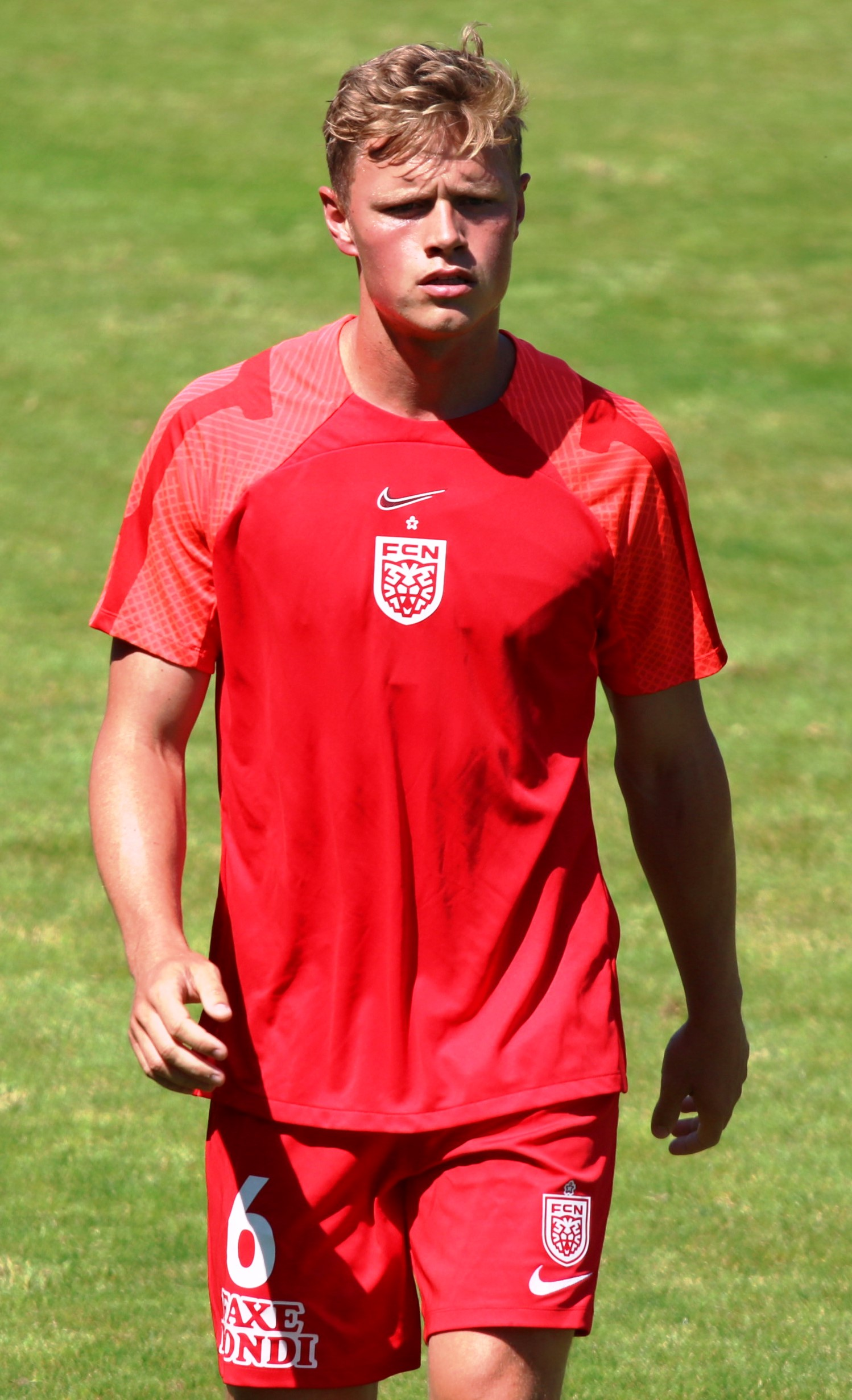
Tverskov with Nordsjælland in 2023.

On 21 June 2023, Tverskov signed for Nordsjælland, signing a contract until June 2025.

=== San Diego FC ===
On 19 March 2024, MLS expansion team San Diego FC announced that Tverskov would join the club ahead of their 2025 inaugural season, signing a two-year contract through 2026, set to be activated on 1 January 2025.

== Career statistics ==
As of match played 17 October 2026

Appearances and goals by club, season and competition
Club	Season	League			National cup (Note: Includes Danish Cup)		Continental		Other		Total	
Club	Season	Division	Apps	Goals	Apps	Goals	Apps	Goals	Apps	Goals	Apps	Goals
Lyngby	2012–13	Danish 1st Division	5	0	—		—		—		5	0
Lyngby	2013–14	Danish 1st Division	30	2	4	0	—		—		34	2
Lyngby	Total		35	2	4	0	—		—		39	2
Randers	2014–15	Danish Superliga	16	1	3	2	—		—		19	3
Randers	2015–16	Danish Superliga	22	2	2	0	3 (Note: Appearances in UEFA Europa League)	0	—		27	2
Randers	Total		38	3	5	2	3	0	—		46	5
Odense BK	2016–17	Danish Superliga	34	0	2	0	—		—		36	0
Odense BK	2017–18	Danish Superliga	26	1	2	0	—		—		28	1
Odense BK	2018–19	Danish Superliga	35	1	5	0	—		—		40	1
Odense BK	2019–20	Danish Superliga	30	1	2	0	—		—		32	1
Odense BK	2020–21	Danish Superliga	29	3	3	0	—		—		32	3
Odense BK	2021–22	Danish Superliga	26	0	7	0	—		—		33	0
Odense BK	2022–23	Danish Superliga	30	2	1	0	—		—		31	2
Odense BK	Total		210	8	22	0	—		—		232	8
Nordsjælland	2023–24	Danish Superliga	32	4	4	0	10 (Note: Appearances in UEFA Europa Conference League)	1	—		46	5
Nordsjælland	2024–25	Danish Superliga	15	1	2	0	—		—		17	1
Nordsjælland	Total		47	5	6	0	10	1	—		63	6
San Diego FC	2025	Major League Soccer	33	2	0	0	—		7 (Note: Five appearances in MLS Cup playoffs, two appearances in Leagues Cup)	0	40	2
San Diego FC	2026	Major League Soccer	24	0	0	0	4 (Note: Appearances in CONCACAF Champions Cup)	0	3 (Note: Appearances in Leagues Cup)	0	31	0
San Diego FC	Total		57	2	0	0	4	0	10	0	77	5
Career total			387	20	37	2	17	1	10	0	451	23

== Honours ==
Individual

- MLS All-Star: 2025
