= Issam Jebali =

Tunisian footballer

Personal information
- Full name: Issam Jebali
- Date of birth: 25 December 1991 (age 34)
- Place of birth: Majaz al Bab, Tunisia
- Height: 1.82 m (6 ft 0 in)
- Positions: Forward; winger

Team information
- Current team: Gamba Osaka
- Number: 11

Senior career*
Years	Team	Apps	(Gls)
2009–2014	Étoile du Sahel	40	(3)
2012–2013	→ Zarzis (loan)	8	(2)
2015–2016	Värnamo	41	(11)
2016–2018	Elfsborg	59	(20)
2018–2019	Rosenborg	7	(3)
2019	Al-Wehda	13	(3)
2019–2023	OB	92	(27)
2023–	Gamba Osaka	88	(16)

International career^{‡}
2018–	Tunisia	13	(2)
- * Club domestic league appearances and goals as of 9 August 2026 ‡ National team caps and goals as of 10 December 2022, 13:50 (UTC)

Issam Jebali (Arabic: عصام الجبالي; born 25 December 1991) is a Tunisian professional footballer who plays as a forward or a winger for J1 League club Gamba Osaka and the Tunisia national team.

== Club career ==
On 9 February 2015, Jebali was announced at Värnamo on a two year contract.

On 18 July 2016, Jebali was announced at Elfsborg on a three and a half year contract. On 23 March 2017, he signed a new four year contract with the club through the 2021 season.

On 8 August 2018, Jebali was announced at Rosenborg on a four year contract, after scoring 5 goals and registering 5 assists with Elfsborg.

In January 2019, Jebali signed for Al-Wehda. Al-Wehda and Jebali received criticism from Rosenborg as a response to Al-Wehda appearing to announce the signing of Jebali before a deal with Rosenborg was actually finalised.

On 30 July 2019, it was confirmed that Jebali had joined Danish Superliga club Odense Boldklub on a three-year contract. In September 2020, he scored four goals in three matches, and his performances led to him being named as the Danish Superliga Player of the Month.

On 5 January 2023, Jebali officially joined Japanese side Gamba Osaka for an estimated transfer fee of 7.5 million Danish krones (around one million euros), signing a three-year contract with the club. He was named the 2025–26 AFC Champions League Two MVP after helping his club secure the title with a 1–0 victory over Al-Nassr in the final on 16 May 2026.

== International career ==
Jebali was called up to the 2021 Africa Cup of Nations after Firas Ben Larbi withdrew due to injury.

During the Kirin Cup, Jebali scored his first international goal against Chile on 10 June 2022, scoring in the 89th minute.

Jebali was called up to the Tunisia squad for the 2022 FIFA World Cup.

== Career statistics ==
=== Club ===
As of match played 8 December 2024

Appearances and goals by club, season and competition
Club	Season	League			Domestic Cup		League Cup		Continental		Other		Total	
Club	Season	Division	Apps	Goals	Apps	Goals	Apps	Goals	Apps	Goals	Apps	Goals	Apps	Goals
IFK Värnamo	2015	Superettan	26	5	1	0	—		—		—		27	5
IFK Värnamo	2016	Superettan	15	6	3	0	—		—		—		18	6
IFK Värnamo	Total		41	11	4	0	—		—		—		45	11
IF Elfsborg	2016	Allsvenskan	15	7	0	0	—		—		—		15	7
IF Elfsborg	2017	Allsvenskan	29	10	2	1	—		—		—		31	11
IF Elfsborg	2018	Allsvenskan	15	3	4	2	—		—		—		19	5
IF Elfsborg	Total		59	20	6	3	—		—		—		65	23
Rosenborg	2018	Eliteserien	7	3	1	0	—		5	2	—		13	5
Al-Wehda	2018–19	Saudi Pro League	13	3	1	0	—		—		—		14	3
OB	2019–20	Danish Superliga	19	3	1	0	—		—		5	0	25	3
OB	2020–21	Danish Superliga	30	10	3	1	—		—		—		33	11
OB	2021–22	Danish Superliga	25	10	5	1	—		—		—		30	11
OB	2022–23	Danish Superliga	13	4	1	0	—		—		—		14	4
OB	Total		92	27	10	2	—		—		5	0	107	29
Gamba Osaka	2023	J1 League	29	5	1	0	4	0	—		—		34	5
Gamba Osaka	2024	J1 League	18	2	3	1	0	0	—		—		21	3
Gamba Osaka	Total		47	7	4	1	4	0	—		—		55	8
Career total			254	71	26	6	4	0	5	2	5	0	294	79

== International goals ==
No.	Date	Venue	Opponent	Score	Result	Competition
1.	10 June 2022	Noevir Stadium Kobe, Kobe, Japan	Chile	1–0	2–0	2022 Kirin Cup Soccer
2.	14 June 2022	Panasonic Stadium Suita, Suita, Japan	Japan	3–0	3–0	2022 Kirin Cup Soccer

== Honours ==
Gamba Osaka

- AFC Champions League Two: 2025–26

Tunisia

- Kirin Cup Soccer: 2022

Individual

- Superliga Player of the Month: September 2020
- Kirin Cup Soccer top scorer: 2022
- AFC Champions League Two MVP: 2025–26
