= 2024–25 Botev Plovdiv season =

Botev Plovdiv
2024–25 season
- Chairman: Aleksey Kirichek
- Manager: Dušan Kerkez
- Stadium: Stadion Hristo Botev
- First League: 3rd
- Bulgarian Cup: Pre-season
- UEFA Europa League: Second qualifying round
- Top goalscorer: League: All: Anthony Ujah (2)
- Average home league attendance: 4,215

The 2024–25 season is the 113th season in the history of Botev Plovdiv, and the club's 13th consecutive season in the First League. In addition to the domestic league, the team is scheduled to participate in the Bulgarian Cup and the UEFA Europa League. This article shows player statistics and all matches (official and friendly) that the club will play during the season.

== Transfers ==
=== In ===
Pos.	Player	Transferred from	Fee	Date	Source
FW	(Nigeria) Anthony Ujah	(Germany) Eintracht Braunschweig	Free	1 July 2024	
MF	(Cameroon) Vinni Triboulet	Unattached	Free	8 August 2024	

== Friendlies ==
22 June 2024 Friendly	Botev Plovdiv	1–0	Beroe

25 June 2024 Friendly	Cherno More	2–5	Botev Plovdiv

2 July 2024 Friendly	Botev Plovdiv	2–3	Botev Plovdiv II

3 July 2024 Friendly	Botev Plovdiv	2–0	Krumovgrad

16 January 2025 Friendly	Lech Poznań (Poland)	0–0	(Bulgaria) Botev Plovdiv	Lara
10:00 EET		Report		Stadium: Hotel Nirvana Cosmopolitan - Field 1

19 January 2025 Friendly	Botev Plovdiv (Bulgaria)	2–3	(Serbia) Čukarički	Antalya
16:00 EET		Report		Stadium: Mardan 2. Stadı

23 January 2025 Friendly	Spartak Trnava (Slovakia)	2–1	(Bulgaria) Botev Plovdiv	Belek
16:30 EET		Report		Stadium: Papillon Sports Centre - Field D

26 January 2025 Friendly	Botev Plovdiv (Bulgaria)	1–2	(Russia) Yenisey	Belek
16:30 EET		Report		Stadium: Papillon Sports Centre - Field D

27 January 2025 Friendly	Nieciecza (Poland)	1–1	(Bulgaria) Botev Plovdiv	Belek
11:00 EET		Report		Stadium: Papillon Sports Centre - Field D

== Competitions ==
=== Overall record ===
Competition	First match	Last match	Starting round	Record							
Competition	First match	Last match	Starting round	Pld	W	D	L	GF	GA	GD	Win %
First League	21 July 2024	18 April 2025	Matchday 1	2	1	1	0	5	3	+2	50.00
Bulgarian Cup				0	0	0	0	0	0	+0	—
UEFA Europa League	11 July 2024			4	1	1	2	5	9	−4	25.00
Total				6	2	2	2	10	12	−2	33.33

Last updated: 1 August 2024
Source: Soccerway

=== First Professional Football League ===
==== League table ====
Pos	Team	Pld	W	D	L	GF	GA	GD	Pts	Qualification
3	Arda	30	15	8	7	49	33	+16	53 (Note: Head-to-head points: Arda 4; Cherno More 1.)	Qualification for the Championship group
4	Cherno More	30	14	11	5	41	25	+16	53	Qualification for the Championship group
5	Botev Plovdiv	30	14	7	9	32	31	+1	49	Qualification for the Conference League group
6	Spartak Varna	30	14	6	10	39	38	+1	48	Qualification for the Conference League group
7	CSKA Sofia	30	13	8	9	40	27	+13	47	Qualification for the Conference League group

Source: soccerway, Bulgarian Football
Rules for classification: 1) Points; 2) Head-to-head points; 3) Head-to-head goal difference; 4) Head-to-head goals scored; 5) Head-to-head away goals scored (only if two teams); 6) Goal difference; 7) Goals scored; 8) Fairplay ranking; 9) Draw
Notes:

Pos	Team	Pld	W	D	L	GF	GA	GD	Pts	Qualification	LUD	LEV	CHM	ARD
1	Ludogorets Razgrad (C)	36	25	8	3	70	22	+48	83	Qualification for the Champions League first qualifying round	—	1–1	2–0	2–2
2	Levski Sofia	36	21	9	6	64	29	+35	72	Qualification for the Europa League first qualifying round (Note: As Ludogorets Razgrad won the 2024–25 Bulgarian Cup, the cup's Europa League first qualifying round berth was passed to the second-placed team in the First League.)	2–2	—	2–0	1–1
3	Cherno More	36	15	14	7	44	30	+14	59	Qualification for the Conference League second qualifying round	2–0	0–0	—	1–1
4	Arda (O)	36	15	13	8	54	41	+13	58	Qualification for the Conference League play-off	1–1	0–3	0–0	—

Source: soccerway, Bulgarian Football
Legend: Blue = home team win; Yellow = draw; Red = away team win.
Rules for classification: 1) Points; 2) Head-to-head points; 3) Head-to-head goal difference; 4) Head-to-head goals scored; 5) Head-to-head away goals scored (only if two teams); 6) Goal difference; 7) Goals scored; 8) Fairplay ranking; 9) Draw
(C) Champions; (O) Play-off winners
Notes:

Pos	Team	Pld	W	D	L	GF	GA	GD	Pts	Qualification	CSS	BPD	SPV	BER
1	CSKA Sofia	36	19	8	9	58	28	+30	65	Qualification for the Conference League play-off	—	3–0	5–0	2–1
2	Botev Plovdiv	36	16	8	12	43	43	0	56		0–4	—	3–2	1–1
3	Spartak Varna	36	15	6	15	45	53	−8	51		0–1	2–1	—	1–2
4	Beroe	36	14	7	15	41	43	−2	49		0–3	0–6	3–1	—

Source: soccerway, Bulgarian Football
Legend: Blue = home team win; Yellow = draw; Red = away team win.
Rules for classification: 1) Points; 2) Head-to-head points; 3) Head-to-head goal difference; 4) Head-to-head goals scored; 5) Head-to-head away goals scored (only if two teams); 6) Goal difference; 7) Goals scored; 8) Fairplay ranking; 9) Draw

Pos	Team	Pld	W	D	L	GF	GA	GD	Pts	Qualification or relegation	SLA	LSO	CSK	SEP	LPD	BVR	KRU	HEB
1	Slavia Sofia	37	14	7	16	50	52	−2	49		—	0–0	0–1	—	1–2	—	—	3–2
2	Lokomotiv Sofia	37	13	8	16	43	51	−8	47 (Note: Head-to-head points: Lokomotiv Sofia 4; CSKA 1948 1.)		—	—	2–1	—	—	3–0	3–0	3–0
3	CSKA 1948	37	12	11	14	45	47	−2	47		—	—	—	2–0	—	0–1	2–0	0–0
4	Septemvri Sofia	37	14	3	20	42	56	−14	45		3–1	0–2	—	—	2–0	—	—	1–0
5	Lokomotiv Plovdiv (O)	37	10	8	19	37	49	−12	38	Qualification for the relegation play-off	—	1–1	0–1	—	—	1–3	—	—
6	Botev Vratsa (O)	37	10	6	21	34	65	−31	36	Qualification for the relegation play-off	2–1	—	—	3–2	—	—	1–0	—
7	Krumovgrad (R)	37	8	9	20	20	45	−25	33	Relegation to the Second League	0–1	—	—	1–2	0–4	—	—	—
8	Hebar (R)	37	4	9	24	28	64	−36	21	Relegation to the Second League	—	—	—	—	1–2	1–0	1–3	—

Source: Soccerway, Bulgarian Football
Legend: Blue = home team win; Yellow = draw; Red = away team win.
Rules for classification: 1) Points; 2) Head-to-head points (only in regular season); 3) Head-to-head goal difference (only in regular season); 4) Head-to-head goals scored (only in regular season); 5) Head-to-head away goals scored (only if two teams and only in regular season); 6) Goal difference; 7) Goals scored; 8) Fairplay ranking; 9) Draw
(O) Play-off winners; (R) Relegated

==== Results summary ====
Overall								Home						Away					
Pld	W	D	L	GF	GA	GD	Pts	W	D	L	GF	GA	GD	W	D	L	GF	GA	GD
20	13	2	5	23	15	+8	41	6	2	2	14	9	+5	7	0	3	9	6	+3

Last updated: 9 February 2025.
Source: soccerway

===== Results by round =====
Round	1	2	3	4	5	6	7	8	9	10	11	12	13	14	15	16	17	18	19	20	21	22
Ground	A	H	A	H	A	H	A	H	A	A	H	A	H	A	H	H	A	H	A	H	A	H
Result	W	D	W	L	W	L	W	W	L	W	W	W	W	L	W	W	W	W	L	D		
Position	2	3	4	5	5	5	5	4	4	4	3	3	3	3	2	2	2	2	3	3		

Updated to match(es) played on 9 February 2025. Source: See Results
A = Away; H = Home; W = Win; D = Draw; L = Loss

==== Matches ====
The match schedule was released on 13 June 2024.

21 July 2024 1	Botev Vratsa	1–3	Botev Plovdiv	Vratsa
19:00 UTC+3	Genov 60'; Kondrakov (yellow card) 74'		Sekulić 54', 57'; Karabelyov 77'	Stadium: Hristo Botev; Referee: Volen Chinkov

28 July 2024 2	Botev Plovdiv	2–2	Lokomotiv Plovdiv	Plovdiv
21:15 UTC+3	Iliev 17'; Ukaki 72'; Conte (yellow card) 14'		Ntelo 56'; Lamy 90+2'; Ivanov (yellow card) 32'; Iliev (yellow card) 41'; Medved (yellow card) 90+7'	Stadium: Hristo Botev; Referee: Georgi KAbakov

04 August 2024 3	Krumovgrad	0–1	Botev Plovdiv	Plovdiv
21:15 UTC+3	Yusein (yellow card) 45+2'; Marin (yellow card) 47'		Etoo 52'; Conte (yellow card) 44'; Ukaki (yellow card) 85'; Bernat (yellow card) 90+1'	Stadium: Nikola Shterev - Starika Sports Complex; Referee: Vasimir EL-Khatib

13.08.2024 4	Botev Plovdiv	P-P	Ludogorets	Plovdiv
UTC+3				Stadium: Stadium Hristo Botev

18.08.2024 5	FC Hebar Pazardzhik	0-1	Botev Plovdiv	Plovdiv
21.15 UTC+3	Tartov (yellow card) 36'; Penchev (yellow card) 52'; Nikolaev (yellow card) 90+5'		Nwachukwu 51'; Perera (yellow card) 22'; Videv (yellow card) 90+4'	Stadium: Stadium Hristo Botev; Referee: Vasil Minev

24 August 2024 6	Botev Plovdiv	0-1	FC Spartak Varna	Plovdiv
21:15 EET	Iliev (yellow card) 57' (yellow-red card) 90+4'	Report	Prce (yellow card) 38'; Ilić (yellow card) 42'; Mateo Jurić Petrašilo (yellow card) 57'; Lesniak (yellow card) 58'; Ahmedov 69'; Granchov (yellow card) 90+1'; Ivey (yellow card) 90+4'	Stadium: Stadium Hristo Botev; Attendance: 2,100; Referee: (Bulgaria) Ivo Andreev

30 August 2024 7	CSKA Sofia	0-1	Botev Plovdiv	Sofia
21:30 EET	Turitsov (yellow card) 55'; Heintz (yellow card) 77'; Lokilo (yellow card) 90+2'	Report	Eto'o (yellow card) 21'; Balogiannis (yellow card) 23'; Nwachukwu (yellow card) 52'; Ukaki 57' (yellow card) 67'; Bernat (yellow card) 64'	Stadium: Stadion Lokomotiv; Attendance: 400; Referee: (Bulgaria) Valentin Zhelezov

14 September 2024 12	Beroe	0-1	Botev Plovdiv	Stara Zagora
20:00 EET	Pineda (yellow card) 72'; Segundo Pachamé (yellow card) 90+2'	Report	Nwachukwu 38'; Maraš (yellow card) 50'; Antonio Perera (yellow card) 80'; Popov (red card) 86'	Stadium: Stadion Beroe; Attendance: 2,649; Referee: (Bulgaria) Georgi Kabakov

23 September 2024 9	Arda	1-0	Botev Plovdiv	Kardzhali
20:00 EET	Eboa Eboa (yellow card) 27'; Tilev 59'; Kotev (yellow card) 90'; Budinov (yellow card) 90'; Offor (yellow card) 90+4'; Stefan Statev (yellow card) 90+7'	Report	Balogiannis (yellow card) 24'; Tamm (red card) 62'; Nwachukwu (yellow card) 81'; Antonio Perera (yellow card) 88'	Stadium: Arena Arda; Attendance: 2,430; Referee: (Bulgaria) Dragomir Draganov

29 September 2024 10	CSKA 1948 Sofia	0-1	Botev Plovdiv	Bistritsa
16:15 EET	Daskalov (yellow card) 10'	Report	Minkov (yellow card) 48'; Balogiannis (yellow card) 53'; Alen Korošec (yellow card) 83'; Maraš 84'	Stadium: Stadion Bistritsa; Attendance: 172; Referee: (Bulgaria) Vasil Minev

5 October 2024 11	Botev Plovdiv	1-0	Levski Sofia	Plovdiv
20:00 EET	Ukaki (yellow card) 15'; Tamm (red card) 63'; Popov (yellow card) 69'; Balogiannis (yellow card) 82'; Triboulet 87'	Report	Maicon (yellow card) 46'	Stadium: Stadium Hristo Botev; Attendance: 9,822; Referee: (Bulgaria) Nikola Popov

19 October 2024 8	Botev Plovdiv	1-0	Slavia Sofia	Plovdiv
18:45 EET	Minkov 60'	Report	Nguyen Do (yellow card) 58'	Stadium: Stadium Hristo Botev; Attendance: 5,897; Referee: (Bulgaria) Georgi Ginchev

25 October 2024 13	Botev Plovdiv	1-0	Cherno More	Plovdiv
16:30 EET	Triboulet 5'; Alen Korošec (yellow card) 36'; Balogiannis (yellow card) 56'; Maraš (yellow card) 90+2'	Report	Dimov (yellow card) 78'; Calcan (yellow card) 90'	Stadium: Stadium Hristo Botev; Attendance: 1,744; Referee: (Bulgaria) Georgi Davidov

4 November 2024 14	Septemvri Sofia	1-0	Botev Plovdiv	Sofia
17:30 EET	Bertrand Fourrier 31'; Onasci (yellow card) 65'; Alfons Amade (yellow card) 90+1'	Report	Balogiannis (yellow card) 43'; Matijus Remeikis (yellow card) 45+1'; Nwachukwu (yellow card) 58'; Atanas Chernev (yellow card) 83'; Triboulet (yellow card) 90+3'	Stadium: Stadion Georgi Asparuhov; Attendance: 1,032; Referee: (Bulgaria) Vasimir El Khatib

8 November 2024 15	Botev Plovdiv	2-0	Lokomotiv Sofia	Plovdiv
17:30 EET	Triboulet 61'; Ukaki 68'	Report		Stadium: Stadium Hristo Botev; Attendance: 2,000; Referee: (Bulgaria) Dimitar Dimitrov

23 November 2024 16	Botev Plovdiv	3-1	Botev Vratsa	Plovdiv
15:00 EET	Nwachukwu 33' (yellow card) 72'; Triboulet 45+1'; Karabelyov (yellow card) 86'; Maraš 90+2'	Report	Georgiev (yellow card) 55'; David Suárez 58'; Marinov (yellow card) 63'; Dichev (red card) 70'; Smolenski (yellow card) 74'; Federico Barrios (yellow card) 90+2'	Stadium: Stadium Hristo Botev; Attendance: 3,325; Referee: (Bulgaria) Marijan Grebencharski

1 December 2024 17	Lokomotiv Plovdiv	0-1	Botev Plovdiv	Plovdiv
12:30 EET	Juan Perea (yellow card) 89'	Report	Nwachukwu (yellow card) 65'; Karabelyov (yellow card) 75'; Ukaki 79'; Popov (yellow card) 85'; Bernat (yellow card) 86'; Minkov (yellow card) 89'	Stadium: Stadion Lokomotiv; Attendance: 3,211; Referee: (Bulgaria) Radoslav Gidzhenov

5 December 2024 18	Botev Plovdiv	1-0	Krumovgrad	Plovdiv
17:30 EET	Alen Korošec 56' (yellow card) 75'	Report	Milev (yellow card) 65'	Stadium: Stadium Hristo Botev; Attendance: 2,300; Referee: (Bulgaria) Ivo Andreev

8 December 2024 19	Ludogorets	3-0	Botev Plovdiv	Razgrad
17:00 EET	Dinis Almeida 12'; Pedro Naressi 69'; Duah 80' (pen.); Chochev (yellow card) 88'	Report	Iliev (yellow card) 53'; Tamm (yellow card) 54'; Balogiannis (yellow card) 66'; Conte (yellow card) 80'	Stadium: Huvepharma Arena; Attendance: 1,442; Referee: (Bulgaria) Krasen Georgiev

19 December 2024 4	Botev Plovdiv	2-4	Ludogorets	Plovdiv
17:00 EET	Akere 5'; Maraš 63' (pen.)	Report	Rwan Cruz 20' 40'; Rick 45+1'; Piotrowski 55'; Verdon (yellow card) 62'; Duah (yellow card) 85'	Stadium: Stadium Hristo Botev; Attendance: 5,045; Referee: (Bulgaria) Dragomir Draganov

9 February 2025 20	Botev Plovdiv	1-1	Hebar	Plovdiv
14:30 EET	Minkov (yellow card) 4'; Akere 45' (yellow card) 55'	Report	Karabelyov 32' (o.g.); Mazáň (yellow card) 35'; Markelo (yellow card) 45+1'; Guermouche (yellow card) 73'; Kort (yellow card) 79'	Stadium: Stadium Hristo Botev; Attendance: 2,345; Referee: (Bulgaria) Georgi Ginchev

15 February 2025 21	Spartak Varna	-	Botev Plovdiv	Varna
15:00 EET				Stadium: Stadion Spartak

=== Bulgarian Cup ===
31 October 2024 Round of 32	Minyor Pernik	0-1	Botev Plovdiv	Pernik
13:30 EET	Semerdzhiev (yellow card) 36'; David Dzhorov (yellow card) 82'; Vutsov (yellow card) 84'; Valentin Petrov (yellow card) 90+3'	Report	Christian Kassi 26'; Akere (yellow card) 59'	Stadium: Stadion Minyor; Referee: (Bulgaria) Volen Chinkov

15 December 2024 Round of 16	Lokomotiv Sofia	1-5	Botev Plovdiv	Sofia
13:00 EET	Dikov (yellow card) 42'; Athanasios Pitsolis 59'	Report	Maraš 10'; Orachev 32' (o.g.); Akere 36'; Popov 63'; Christian Kassi 80'	Stadium: Stadion Lokomotiv; Attendance: 650; Referee: (Bulgaria) Martin Velikov

27 February 2025 Quarter-finals	Ludogorets	-	Botev Plovdiv	Razgrad
18:00 EET				Stadium: Huvepharma Arena

=== UEFA Europa League ===
==== First qualifying round ====
11 July 2024 First leg	Botev Plovdiv (Bulgaria)	2–1	(Slovenia) Maribor	Plovdiv
21:00 UTC+3	Ujah 9'; Iliev 74'		Širvys 19'	Stadium: Stadion Hristo Botev; Referee: David Dickinson (Scotland)

18 July 2024 Second leg	Maribor (Slovenia)	2–2 (3–4 agg.)	(Bulgaria) Botev Plovdiv	Maribor, Slovenia
20:15 UTC+2	Repas 13'; Beugre 80'		Nwachukwu 47'; Ujah 60'	Stadium: Ljudski vrt Attendance: 8,124; Referee: Vitaliy Romanov (Ukraine)

==== Second qualifying round ====
25 July 2024 First leg	Panathinaikos (Greece)	2–1	(Bulgaria) Botev Plovdiv	Athens, Greece
21:00 UTC+3	Jeremejeff 8'; Bakasetas 44' (pen.)		Korošec 70'	Stadium: Olympic Stadium; Attendance: 11,236; Referee: David Fuxman (Israel)

1 August 2024 Second leg	Botev Plovdiv (Bulgaria)	0–4 (1–6 agg.)	(Greece) Panathinaikos	Plovdiv
			Jeremejeff 6', 50'; Ujah 34' (o.g.); Đuričić 45+2'	Stadium: Stadion Hristo Botev; Attendance: 17,076; Referee: Daniel Schlager (Germany)

=== UEFA Conference League ===
==== Third qualifying round ====
08 August 2024 First leg	Botev Plovdiv (Bulgaria)	2–1	(Bosnia and Herzegovina) Zrinjski Mostar	Plovdiv, Bulgeria
21:00 UTC+3	Akere 35'; Maraš 79'		Ćuže 77'	Stadium: Stadion Hristo Botev; Attendance: 9,515; Referee: Fábio Veríssimo (Portugal)

15 August 2024 Second leg	Zrinjski Mostar (Bosnia and Herzegovina)	2-0 (3-2 agg.)	(Bulgaria) Botev Plovdiv	Mostar
21.00 UTC+2	Mulahusejnovic 39'; Kis 83'; Mlinar (yellow card) 48'		Nwachukwu (yellow card) 28'; Bernat (yellow card) 34'; Conte (red card) 41'; Tamm (yellow card) 51'	Stadium: Stadion pod Bijelim Brijegom; Referee: Rob Hennessy (Republic of Ireland)
