= Mathias Brems =

Danish footballer (born 2002)

Personal information
- Full name: Mathias Brems Jensen
- Date of birth: 13 March 2002 (age 24)
- Place of birth: Brenderup, Denmark
- Height: 1.91 m (6 ft 3 in)
- Position: Left-back

Team information
- Current team: Nykøbing
- Number: 4

Youth career
- Brenderup IF
- Middelfart
- 2014–2021: OB

Senior career*
Years	Team	Apps	(Gls)
2021–2022	OB	3	(0)
2022–2026	Helsingør	104	(3)
2026–	Nykøbing	5	(0)

International career
2017–2018	Denmark U-16	5	(0)
2018–2019	Denmark U-17	4	(0)
- * Club domestic league appearances and goals as of 3 October 2026

Mathias Brems Jensen (born 13 March 2002) is a Danish professional footballer who plays as a left-back for Danish 2nd Division club Nykøbing.

== Career ==
=== OB ===
Born in Brenderup, Brems started his career at Brenderup IF and later played for Middelfart, before joining OB. In March 2019, shortly after his 17th birthday, Brems signed a two-year youth contract with OB.

After helping the U19 team lifting the trophy in the Danish U19 league, Brems got his official and professional debut for OB in a Danish Superliga game on 4 July 2020 against SønderjyskE. Brems started on the bench, before replacing Oliver Lund in the 58th minute. Brems was also subbed in, in the following game against Silkeborg IF.

In December 2020, Brems signed his first professional contract, running from 1 July 2021 and two years onwards, which also secured him a permanent promotion to the first team squad from the summer 2021. In the 2019–20 season, Brems only made one appearance for OB's first team, which was in the Danish Cup. In the following 2021–22 season, Brems played just 110 minutes over three games for OB's first team.

In June 2022, he went on a trial at AC Horsens. However, it did not result in a contract for young Brems, who therefore returned to Horsens, where he had a contract until 2023.

=== FC Helsingør ===
After a trial at Horsens in June 2022, Brems tried his luck again, this time with a trial at Danish 1st Division club FC Helsingør. a few days later. On 5 July 2022 the club confirmed, that they had signed Brems permanently on a deal until June 2024.

In January 2024, Brems extended his contract until June 2026.
