= Mart Lieder =

Dutch footballer (born 1990)

Personal information
- Date of birth: 1 May 1990 (age 36)
- Place of birth: Purmerend, Netherlands
- Height: 1.88 m (6 ft 2 in)
- Position: Forward

Youth career
- De Wherevogels
- Volendam
- AFC
- Hollandia
- FC Purmerend
- VPV Purmersteijn

Senior career*
Years	Team	Apps	(Gls)
2012	Vitesse	3	(0)
2012–2014	RKC Waalwijk	30	(4)
2014–2015	Dordrecht	23	(3)
2015–2016	FC Aarau	31	(4)
2016–2018	Eindhoven	69	(45)
2018–2020	SønderjyskE	53	(13)
2020–2022	OB	30	(3)
2022–2023	Emmen	4	(0)
2024	Eindhoven	12	(1)
Total		255	(73)
- * Club domestic league appearances and goals

Mart Lieder (born 1 May 1990) is a Dutch former professional footballer who played as a forward. He formerly played for Vitesse, RKC Waalwijk, Dordrecht, FC Aarau, Eindhoven and Emmen.

== Career ==
On 6 January 2020, it was confirmed that Lieder would join Odense Boldklub as a free agent on 30 June 2020. He was bought free on 28 January 2020 and joined the club immediately. On 27 January 2022 OB confirmed, that Lieder's contract had been terminated by mutual consent.

On 27 January 2022, Lieder signed with Emmen until the summer of 2023.

On 14 January 2024, Lieder returned to FC Eindhoven on amateur basis. He announced his retirement from football in May 2024.
