= Aron Elís Þrándarson =

Icelandic footballer

Personal information
- Full name: Aron Elís Þrándarson
- Date of birth: 10 November 1994 (age 32)
- Place of birth: Reykjavík, Iceland
- Height: 1.86 m (6 ft 1 in)
- Position: Midfielder

Team information
- Current team: Víkingur Reykjavík
- Number: 21

Youth career
- Víkingur Reykjavík

Senior career*
Years	Team	Apps	(Gls)
2011–2014	Víkingur Reykjavík	54	(22)
2015–2019	Aalesund	124	(18)
2020–2023	OB	86	(3)
2023–	Víkingur Reykjavík	54	(17)

International career^{‡}
2010	Iceland U16	4	(0)
2010–2011	Iceland U17	5	(0)
2011	Iceland U18	3	(0)
2011–2012	Iceland U19	6	(1)
2014–2016	Iceland U21	14	(2)
2016–	Iceland	17	(1)
- * Club domestic league appearances and goals as of 1 November 2026 ‡ National team caps and goals as of 21 November 2022

Aron Elís Þrándarson (born 10 November 1994) is an Icelandic footballer who plays for Icelandic Besta deild club Víkingur Reykjavík as a midfielder and the Iceland national team.

== Career ==
=== Club ===
On 6 October 2014, Aron signed a three-year contract with Norwegian Eliteserien side Aalesunds FK. Aron made his debut for Aalesund on 3 June 2015, in a 1-0 Norwegian Cup defeat to IL Hødd, with his league debut coming 4 days later in a 2–1 victory over FK Haugesund. On 23 December 2019, Aron signed a three-and-a-half-year contract with Danish side OB. On 27 June 2023 it was announced that Aron had signed a four-year contract with his first club Víkingur Reykjavík.

=== International ===
Aron has represented Iceland at U-17, U-19 and U-21 level.

He made his senior debut against the United States on 31 January 2016.

=== International goals ===
Scores and results list Iceland's goal tally first, score column indicates score after each Aron Elís goal.

List of international goals scored by Aron Elís Þrándarson
No.	Date	Venue	Opponent	Score	Result	Competition
1	9 June 2022	San Marino Stadium, Serravalle, San Marino	San Marino	1–0	1–0	Friendly

== Career statistics ==
=== Club ===
As of match played 3 June 2023

Club	Season	League			National Cup		League Cup		Continental		Total	
Club	Season	Division	Apps	Goals	Apps	Goals	Apps	Goals	Apps	Goals	Apps	Goals
Víkingur Reykjavík	2011	Úrvalsdeild	9	2	0	0	2	0	-		11	2
Víkingur Reykjavík	2012	1. deild	15	1	2	1	1	0	-		18	2
Víkingur Reykjavík	2013	1. deild	14	14	3	1	4	1	-		21	16
Víkingur Reykjavík	2014	Úrvalsdeild	16	5	4	2	5	1	-		25	8
Víkingur Reykjavík	Total		54	22	9	4	12	2	0	0	75	28
Aalesund	2015	Eliteserien	18	5	1	0	-		-		19	5
Aalesund	2016	Eliteserien	29	3	2	0	-		-		31	3
Aalesund	2017	Eliteserien	24	1	2	0	-		-		26	1
Aalesund	2018	1. divisjon	26	3	0	0	-		-		26	3
Aalesund	2019	1. divisjon	27	6	2	1	-		-		29	7
Aalesund	Total		124	18	7	1	0	0	0	0	131	19
OB	2019–20	Danish Superliga	12	1	0	0	-		-		12	1
OB	2020–21	Danish Superliga	26	1	2	1	-		-		28	2
OB	2021–22	Danish Superliga	22	0	4	1	-		-		26	1
OB	2022–23	Danish Superliga	26	1	1	0	-		-		27	1
OB	Total		86	3	7	2	0	0	0	0	93	5
Víkingur Reykjavík	2023	Besta deild	0	0	0	0	0	0	0	0	0	0
Career total			264	43	23	7	12	2	0	0	299	52
