= Troels Kløve =

Danish footballer (born 1990)

Personal information
- Full name: Troels Kløve Hallstrøm
- Date of birth: 23 October 1990 (age 36)
- Place of birth: Horsens, Denmark
- Height: 1.77 m (5 ft 10 in)
- Position: Midfielder

Youth career
- 1997–2003: Hatting/Torsted
- 2003–2010: Horsens

Senior career*
Years	Team	Apps	(Gls)
2010–2015	Horsens	96	(17)
2015–2018	SønderjyskE	58	(7)
2018–2024	OB	125	(15)
2022–2024	→ SønderjyskE (loan)	36	(4)
- * Club domestic league appearances and goals as of 3 June 2024

Troels Kløve Hallstrøm (born 23 October 1990) is a Danish former professional footballer who played as a midfielder.

== Career ==
Kløve started playing football for Hatting/Torsted as a six-year-old but moved to the AC Horsens youth academy in 2003. He made his senior debut for the club on 19 June 2010 in a second-tier Danish 1st Division match against BK Frem, coming on as a substitute in the 60th minute for André Bjerregaard.

On 12 June 2015, Kløve signed a three-year contract with SønderjyskE.

Kløve moved to OB on 24 January 2018. He made his debut for the club on 12 February in a 6–1 win over FC Helsingør, in which he provided two assists. On 8 July 2022, Kløve returned to SønderjyskE on a two-year loan deal. A few days later, due to FIFA's new rules which did not allow two-year loan deals, the clubs announced that it was only a one-year loan.

On 8 May 2024, Kløve announced that he will retire from football after the season.
