= Jens Jakob Thomasen =

Danish footballer (born 1996)

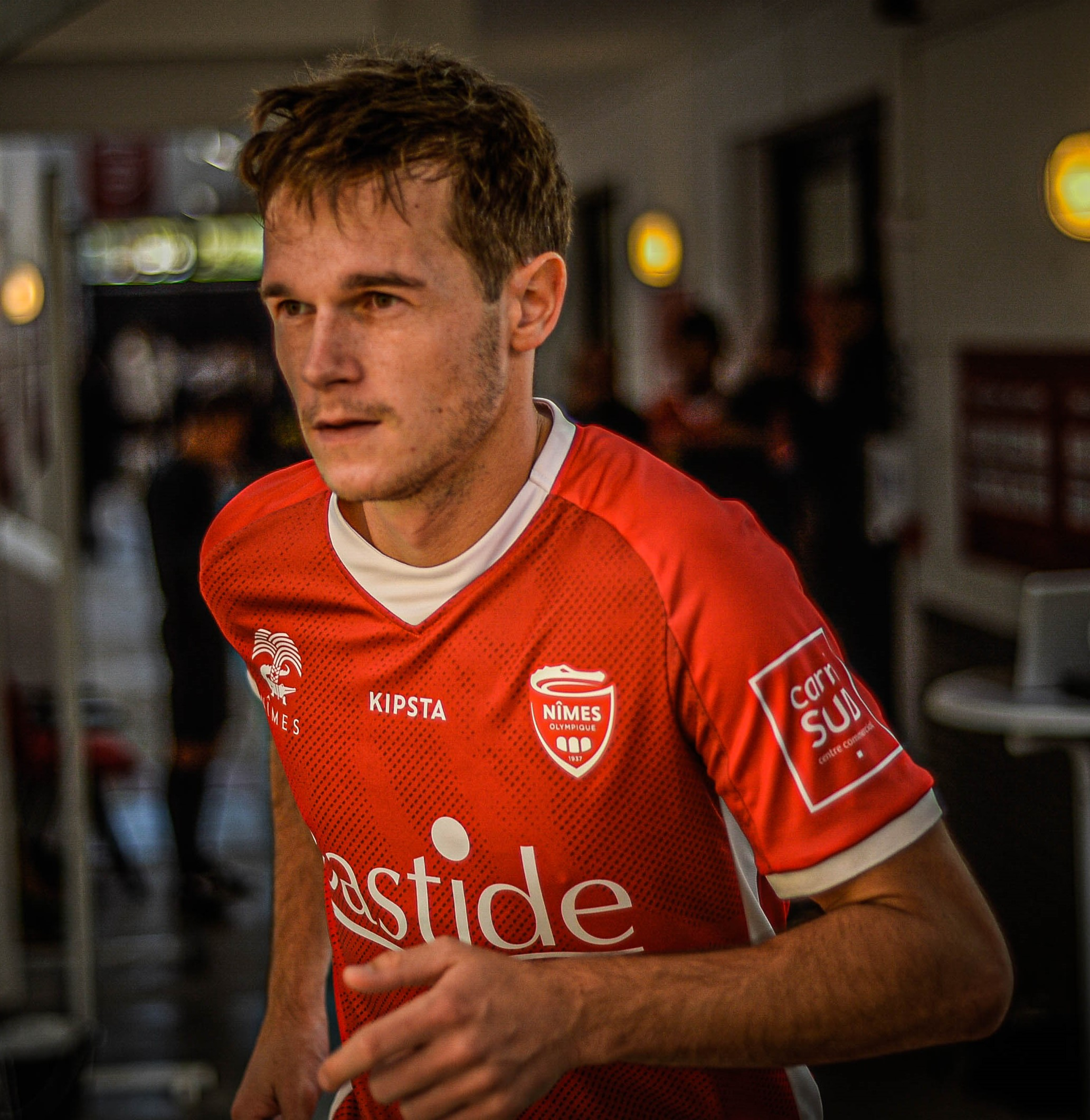
- Thomasen in 2022.

Personal information
- Full name: Jens Jakob Dyhr Thomasen
- Date of birth: 25 June 1996 (age 30)
- Place of birth: Sanderum, Denmark
- Height: 1.77 m (5 ft 10 in)
- Position: Midfielder

Team information
- Current team: Lyngby
- Number: 18

Youth career
- Sanderum BK
- 2007–2015: OB

Senior career*
Years	Team	Apps	(Gls)
2015–2022	OB	168	(10)
2022–2023	Nîmes	23	(2)
2023–2025	IF Elfsborg	31	(0)
2026–	Lyngby	9	(1)

International career
2012	Denmark U16	5	(1)
2012–2013	Denmark U17	11	(1)
2013–2014	Denmark U18	5	(0)
2014–2015	Denmark U19	8	(0)
2015–2017	Denmark U20	4	(0)
2017	Denmark U21	2	(0)
- * Club domestic league appearances and goals as of 2 June 2026

Jens Jakob Dyhr Thomasen (Danish pronunciation: [ˈtsʰʌmæsn̩]; born 25 June 1996) is a Danish professional footballer who plays as a midfielder for Danish Superliga club Lyngby Boldklub.

== Club career ==
=== Early career ===
Born in Sanderum, a suburb of Odense, Thomas started playing football in the youth of Sanderum Boldklub before moving to Odense Boldklub's youth academy at age 11.

=== OB ===
On 24 April 2015, Thomasen made his debut for OB in a 2–0 win over Esbjerg fB in the Danish Superliga. Surprisingly he was in the starting lineup and was not even a part of the first team squad yet. He played the first 62 minutes before being replaced by Mathias Greve.

In the summer of 2015, at the age of 19, Thomasen was moved permanently to the first team squad.

On 1 November 2015, Thomasen signed a contract extension until 2019. Thomasen was named as the "Revelation of the Year" in OB for 2016. His contract was extended another two-and-a-half years in January 2018. Thomasen announced in May 2022 that he would leave OB because he was looking for a new challenge and because his contract was about to expire.

=== Nîmes ===
On 8 July 2022, French Ligue 2 club Nîmes Olympique confirmed that Thomasen had joined the club on a one-year contract with the possibility of a further one-year extension. He made his official debut for the club on 30 July 2022 in a 1–0 defeat against Caen in Ligue 2.

=== IF Elfsborg ===
A year after his transfer to France, it was confirmed, in July 2023, that Thomasen had joined Swedish Allsvenskan club IF Elfsborg on a deal until the end of 2025.

=== Lyngby BK ===
On 2 February 2026, Thomasen signed for Danish 1st Division club Lyngby Boldklub on a contract running until the summer of 2027.

== Honours ==
Lyngby

- Danish 1st Division: 2025–26
