= Alexander Juel Andersen =

Danish footballer (born 1991)

Personal information
- Date of birth: 29 January 1991 (age 35)
- Place of birth: Viborg, Denmark
- Height: 1.88 m (6 ft 2 in)
- Position: Full-back

Team information
- Current team: Viborg FF (scout)

Youth career
- Bruunshåb-Tapdrup IF
- FK Viborg

Senior career*
Years	Team	Apps	(Gls)
2007–2011	Viborg FF	60	(0)
2011	→ Randers (loan)	0	(0)
2011–2013	Horsens	58	(5)
2013–2018	AGF	100	(7)
2018–2020	Vendsyssel	36	(0)
2019	→ OB (loan)	11	(0)
2020–2022	OB	40	(2)
2022	→ Aalesund (loan)	14	(0)
2022–2023	Aalesund	20	(0)
Total		339	(14)

International career
2007–2008	Denmark U17	16	(2)
2009	Denmark U18	3	(0)
2009–2010	Denmark U19	6	(0)
2012	Denmark U20	1	(0)
2012	Denmark U21	1	(0)

Managerial career
- 2024–: Viborg FF (scout)
- * Club domestic league appearances and goals

Alexander Juel Andersen (Danish pronunciation: [ælekˈsænˀtɐ ˈjuˀl ˈɑnɐsn̩]; born 29 January 1991) is a Danish retired footballer who played as a full-back.

Alexander Juel Andersen is the little brother of Lars Emil Juel Andersen, who also was a footballer.

== Club career ==
=== Viborg FF ===
Andersen is born and raised in Viborg. He started playing at a local club, Bruunshåb-Tapdrup IF, where he played some years before the trip went on to FK Viborg. Already at the age of 16, he went on a trial at AS Monaco. He was promoted to the first team squad in August 2008 at the age of 17.

His professional career accelerated when he became the fourth youngest player in 2007 to debut in the Danish Superliga. This happened, when he came on the pitch in a Danish Superliga match between Viborg FF and Randers FC at the age of only 16 years. He was nominated as the player of the year by the fans for the 2008/09 season. Andersen started out as a midfielder in his youth career, but was retrained as a defender.

He continued to develop and spent another three years at the club, after extending his contract with the club until 2011. Although he got a good portion of time on the pitch, it wasn't enough for him in the last, so he was loaned out to Randers FC.

==== Loan to Randers FC ====
Andersen was loaned out to Randers FC in January 2011 until the summer 2011. In Randers, Andersen didn't play a single match due to a lot of injuries. He was operated for an injury in his groin in March 2011.

=== AC Horsens ===
AC Horsens signed Andersen already in January 2011, but the transfer would first be valid from the summer 2011, when his contract with Viborg FF expired. He was initially not bought into the starting lineup, but he quickly changed it and quickly became a regular part of Johnny Mølby's squad.

When AC Horsens was relegated to the Danish 1st Division back in 2013, many clubs were interested in the right back, but AGF pulled the longest straw when they presented the player to a 4-year contract with expiry in July 2017.

=== AGF ===
Andersen was official signed on 11 July 2013 by AGF on a 4-year contract.

In AGF Alexander Juel Andersen was conceived as a role on the right back, but slowly he was retrained and was most used in the central defense, becoming one of the club's favorites under Peter Sørensen, while referring more to the bench when Morten Wieghorst took over the coach seat. Andersen also revealed that coach Wieghorst wanted to play him on the midfield.

=== Vendsyssel FF ===
Andersen joined Vendsyssel FF in the summer 2018 and soon became the captain.

=== OB ===
On 2 September 2019, however, he was loaned out to Odense Boldklub for the rest of 2019. After returning til Vendsyssel at the end of the loan spell, Andersen said to the medias, that he was hoping to stay at OB. His wish came true on 8 January 2020, when OB announced, that they had signed the player permanently on a 2,5-year contract.

=== Aalesund ===
On 31 March 2022, Juel Andersen joined Norwegian club Aalesund on a loan deal until the end of June 2022. At the same time, OB announced that the player had extended his contract with the club until the end of 2022. On 31 July 2022, OB announced that they have terminated the contract with Juel Andersen, after which he signed a contract permanently with Aalesund.

Having not been on the pitch since July 2023, it was confirmed the following November that Juel Andersen would leave the Norwegian club at the end of the year.

== Post-retirement ==
After leaving Aalesund at the end of 2023, Juel Andersen was without a club until mid-June 2024 when it was confirmed that he had been hired as head scout in Viborg FF's academy.
