= Ayo Simon Okosun =

Danish footballer (born 1993)

Simon Okosun
Personal information
- Full name: Ayo Simon Okosun
- Date of birth: 21 July 1993 (age 33)
- Place of birth: Copenhagen, Denmark
- Height: 1.97 m (6 ft 6 in)
- Position: Midfielder

Team information
- Current team: Hvidovre
- Number: 6

Youth career
- AB

Senior career*
Years	Team	Apps	(Gls)
2011–2014	AB	44	(0)
2014–2015	Grosseto	11	(0)
2015–2017	Vendsyssel	48	(11)
2017–2018	Horsens	33	(7)
2018–2020	Midtjylland	15	(1)
2019–2020	→ Horsens (loan)	25	(4)
2020–2023	OB	52	(2)
2023–2025	Vendsyssel	68	(9)
2025–	Hvidovre	18	(3)
- * Club domestic league appearances and goals as of 2 June 2026

Ayo Simon Okosun (born 21 July 1993) is a Danish footballer who plays as an attacking midfielder for Hvidovre IF.

== Personal life ==
Okosun was born in Denmark and is of Nigerian and German descent.
