= Kasper Larsen =

Danish footballer (born 1993)

Personal information
- Full name: Kasper Larsen
- Date of birth: 25 January 1993 (age 33)
- Place of birth: Denmark
- Height: 1.90 m (6 ft 3 in)
- Position: Centre-back

Youth career
- –2011: OB

Senior career*
| Years | Team | Apps | (Gls) |
| 2012–2015 | OB | 77 | (2) |
| 2015 | → Astana (loan) | 0 | (0) |
| 2015–2018 | Groningen | 48 | (0) |
| 2018–2019 | Norrköping | 30 | (2) |
| 2020–2022 | OB | 59 | (1) |
| 2022 | → Fehérvár (loan) | 9 | (0) |
| 2023–2025 | Fehérvár | 30 | (1) |

International career
| 2008–2009 | Denmark U16 | 6 | (1) |
| 2009–2011 | Denmark U17 | 13 | (1) |
| 2010–2011 | Denmark U18 | 7 | (0) |
| 2011–2013 | Denmark U19 | 13 | (1) |
| 2012 | Denmark U20 | 3 | (0) |
| 2013–2016 | Denmark U21 | 12 | (0) |
- * Club domestic league appearances and goals as of 18:18, 4 February 2025 (UTC)

Kasper Larsen (born 25 January 1993) is a Danish retired footballer who plays as a centre-back.

== Career ==
=== Club ===
In the 2011–2012 season, Larsen started first-team training in Odense BK. He was integrated in the squad spring 2012 and gained 8 Superliga performances.

In February 2015, Larsen moved to Kazakhstan Premier League side FC Astana on a season-long loan.

In July 2015, Larsen returned to Odense from Astana in July without having played a match for Kazakhstan, and signed for Eredivisie side FC Groningen in August 2015.

On 4 August 2018, Larsen joined Swedish side IFK Norrköping on a free transfer, after his contract with FC Groningen expired earlier that summer.

=== International career ===
In 2012, Larsen was a regular in the Denmark u19 team.

== Career statistics ==
As of match played 23 February 2022

| Club | Season | League | | | National Cup | | Continental | | Other | | Total | |
| Club | Season | Division | Apps | Goals | Apps | Goals | Apps | Goals | Apps | Goals | Apps | Goals |
|---|---|---|---|---|---|---|---|---|---|---|---|---|
| OB | 2011–12 | Danish Superliga | 8 | 0 | - | | - | | - | | 8 | 0 |
| OB | 2012–13 | Danish Superliga | 22 | 0 | 3 | 0 | - | | - | | 24 | 0 |
| OB | 2013–14 | Danish Superliga | 29 | 0 | 3 | 0 | - | | - | | 30 | 0 |
| OB | 2014–15 | Danish Superliga | 14 | 2 | 1 | 0 | - | | - | | 14 | 2 |
| OB | 2015–16 | Danish Superliga | 4 | 0 | - | | - | | - | | 4 | 0 |
| OB | Total | | 77 | 2 | 7 | 0 | 0 | 0 | 0 | 0 | 84 | 2 |
| FC Astana | 2015 | Kazakhstan Premier League | - | | | | | | | | | |
| FC Astana | Total | | 0 | 0 | 0 | 0 | 0 | 0 | 0 | 0 | 0 | 0 |
| FC Groningen | 2015–16 | Eredivisie | 14 | 0 | 1 | 0 | 5 (Note: Appearances in the Europa League) | 0 | - | | 19 | 0 |
| FC Groningen | 2016–17 | Eredivisie | 22 | 0 | 2 | 0 | - | | - | | 24 | 0 |
| FC Groningen | 2017–18 | Eredivisie | 12 | 0 | - | | - | | - | | 12 | 0 |
| FC Groningen | Total | | 48 | 0 | 3 | 0 | 5 | 0 | 0 | 0 | 55 | 0 |
| IFK Norrköping | 2018 | Allsvenskan | 8 | 1 | 2 | 1 | - | | 10 | 2 | | |
| IFK Norrköping | 2019 | Allsvenskan | 22 | 1 | 1 | 0 | 6 | 0 | - | | 29 | 1 |
| IFK Norrköping | Total | | 30 | 2 | 3 | 1 | 6 | 0 | 0 | 0 | 37 | 2 |
| OB | 2019-20 | Danish Superliga | 11 | 1 | - | | - | | - | | 11 | 1 |
| OB | 2020-21 | Danish Superliga | 22 | 0 | 2 | 0 | - | | - | | 25 | 0 |
| OB | 2021-22 | Danish Superliga | 12 | 0 | 5 | 1 | - | | - | | 17 | 1 |
| OB | Total | | 45 | 1 | 7 | 1 | 0 | 0 | 0 | 0 | 53 | 2 |
| Career total | | | 200 | 5 | 20 | 2 | 11 | 0 | 0 | 0 | 231 | 7 |

== Honours ==
=== Club ===
Astana

- Kazakhstan Super Cup (1): 2015
