= Jørgen Skjelvik =

Norwegian footballer (born 1991)

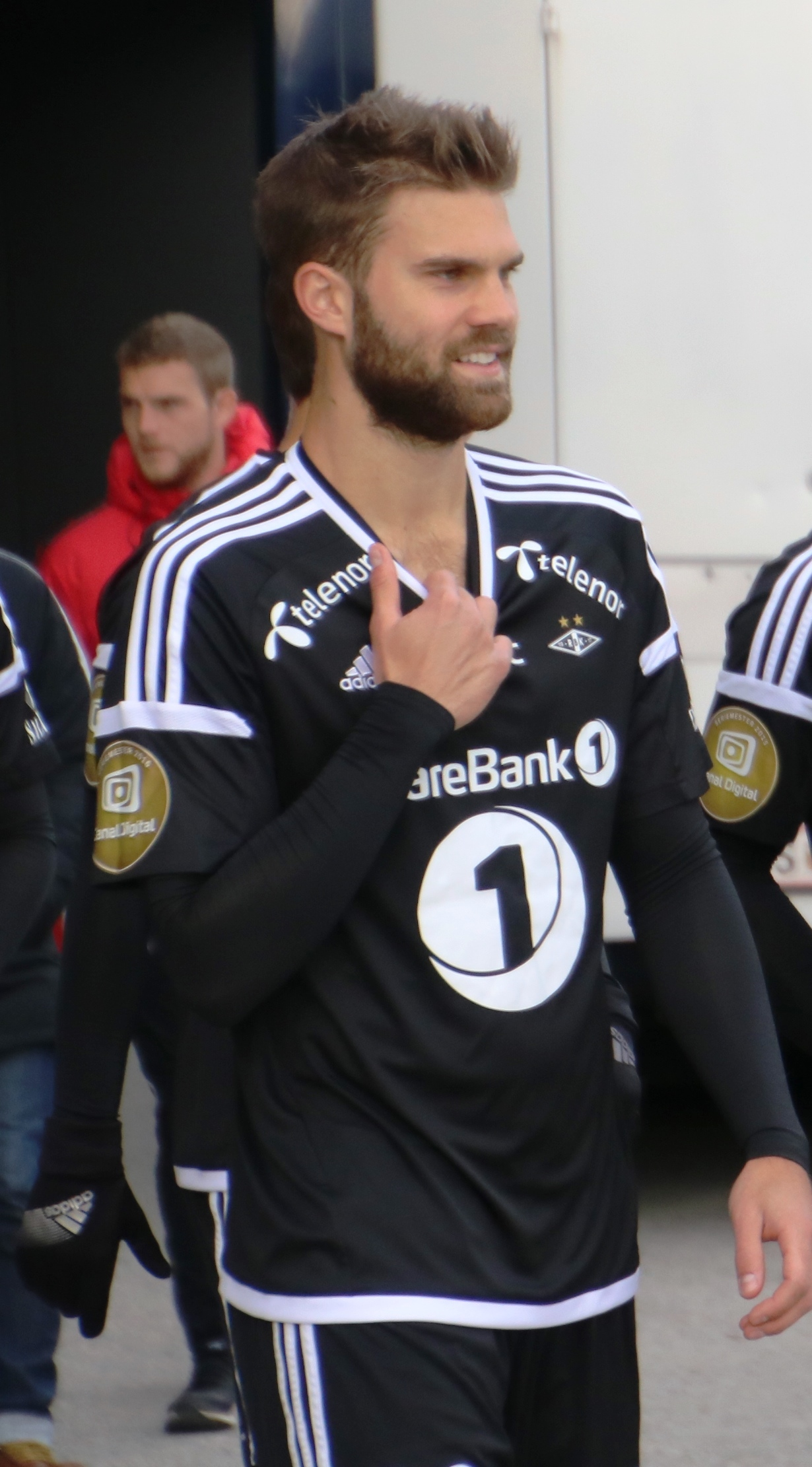
- Jørgen Skjelvik in 2017.

Personal information
- Full name: Jørgen Skjelvik
- Date of birth: 5 July 1991 (age 35)
- Place of birth: Hosle, Bærum, Norway
- Height: 1.83 m (6 ft 0 in)
- Position: Left-back

Team information
- Current team: Stabæk
- Number: 5

Youth career
- Hosle IL
- Stabæk

Senior career*
Years	Team	Apps	(Gls)
2009–2011	Stabæk	29	(0)
2011	→ Helsingborg (loan)	3	(1)
2012–2013	Kalmar	30	(1)
2013–2017	Rosenborg	108	(4)
2018–2020	LA Galaxy	52	(1)
2020	→ OB (loan)	19	(0)
2021–2023	OB	65	(4)
2023–2024	Apollon Limassol	16	(0)
2024–	Stabæk	41	(0)

International career^{‡}
2010	Norway U-18	5	(1)
2010	Norway U-19	6	(0)
2010	Norway U-21	4	(0)
2013	Norway	8	(0)
- * Club domestic league appearances and goals as of 14 November 2026 ‡ National team caps and goals as of 18 November 2020

Jørgen Skjelvik (Norwegian: [ˈjœ̀rɡn̩ ˈʂɛ̀lvɪk]; born 5 July 1991) is a Norwegian professional footballer who plays as a left-back for Stabæk. After starting his career with the local club Stabæk, Skjelvik moved to Sweden where he played in Allsvenskan with Helsingborg and Kalmar, before he returned to Norway and joined Rosenborg in July 2013. He has represented Norway from under-18 to under-21 level, but was left out of the Norwegian squad for the 2013 UEFA European Under-21 Football Championship due to an injury.

== Career ==
Hailing from Hosle in Bærum, Skjelvik played for Stabæk's youth team that won the Norwegian Youth Cup in 2008. He was drafted into the first team in April 2009. He made his first-team debut in the Norwegian football cup, in May 2009 against Sander IL. He had one assist in the game. His league debut came one week later.

On 2 August 2011, it became official that Swedish club Helsingborgs IF would take him in on a loan for the rest of the season. Skjelvik made his debut on 13 August, coming on as a substitution in the 77th minute and also managed to score a goal in the 3–1 win against local rivals Trelleborgs FF. After winning both the Allsvenskan and the Svenska Cupen with Helsingborg in 2011, Skjelvik moved to Kalmar FF ahead of the 2012 season and signed a three-year contract with the club.

Skjelvik played regularly for Kalmar during the 2012 season, and scored two goals and made nine assists. He was injured during the 2013 season, and did only play a few minutes as a substitute. In July 2013 he signed a 4.5-year contract with Norwegian team Rosenborg.

In November 2017, Skjelvik decided not to extend his contract with Rosenborg and would leave as a free agent at the end of the 2017 season.

On 15 December 2017, it was announced he would be joining LA Galaxy in MLS on a free transfer. On the transfer deadline day, 31 January 2020, he was loaned out to Danish Superliga club Odense Boldklub until the end of 2020. On January 7, 2021, Skjelvik signed a permanent deal with Danish club Odense, which will keep him with the club through 2023. Skjelvik left OB at the end of the 2022-23 season, as his contract expired.

== International career ==
Skjelvik was first capped for Norway when he played for the under-18 team in 2009. He has later represented Norway at under-19 and under-21 level. He was regularly in the under-21 team's squad, and played the friendly matches against Russia U-21 and Spain U-21 ahead of the 2013 UEFA European Under-21 Football Championship, but was left out of the squad due to an injury. On 15 November 2013, he made his debut for Norway against Denmark.

== Career statistics ==
=== Club ===
As of match played 26 September 2021

Appearances and goals by club, season and competition
Club	Season	League			National Cup		Continental		Total	
Club	Season	Division	Apps	Goals	Apps	Goals	Apps	Goals	Apps	Goals
Stabæk	2008	Tippeligaen	0	0	1	0	-		1	0
Stabæk	2009	Tippeligaen	4	0	4	1	1	0	9	1
Stabæk	2010	Tippeligaen	18	0	3	1	2	1	23	2
Stabæk	2011	Tippeligaen	7	0	3	1	-		10	1
Stabæk	Total		29	0	11	3	3	1	43	4
Helsingborg (loan)	2011	Allsvenskan	3	1	2	0	1	0	6	1
Helsingborg (loan)	Total		3	1	2	0	1	0	6	1
Kalmar	2012	Allsvenskan	29	1	0	0	2	0	31	1
Kalmar	2013	Allsvenskan	1	0	0	0	-		1	0
Kalmar	Total		30	1	0	0	2	0	32	1
Rosenborg	2013	Tippeligaen	8	0	2	0	-		10	0
Rosenborg	2014	Tippeligaen	28	2	2	0	5	0	35	2
Rosenborg	2015	Tippeligaen	25	2	7	0	13	0	45	2
Rosenborg	2016	Tippeligaen	26	0	6	1	6	1	38	2
Rosenborg	2017	Eliteserien	21	0	3	0	11	0	35	0
Rosenborg	Total		108	4	20	1	35	1	163	6
LA Galaxy	2018	MLS	32	0	1	0	-		33	0
LA Galaxy	2019	MLS	20	1	0	0	-		20	1
LA Galaxy	Total		52	1	1	0	-	-	53	1
OB (loan)	2019–20	Danish Superliga	10	1	0	0	-		10	1
OB (loan)	2020–21	Danish Superliga	18	1	1	0	-		19	1
OB (loan)	2021–22	Danish Superliga	10	2	1	0	-		11	2
OB (loan)	Total		38	4	2	0	-	-	40	4
Career total			260	11	36	4	41	2	337	17

== Honours ==
=== Club ===
Rosenborg

- Norwegian League (3): 2015, 2016, 2017
- Norwegian Football Cup (2): 2015, 2016
