= Mads Kaalund =

Danish footballer (born 1996)

Personal information
- Full name: Mads Kaalund Larsen
- Date of birth: 16 August 1996 (age 30)
- Place of birth: Copenhagen, Denmark
- Height: 1.83 m (6 ft 0 in)
- Position: Midfielder

Youth career
- –2012: AB
- 2012–2014: Lyngby

Senior career*
Years	Team	Apps	(Gls)
2014–2016	Lyngby	1	(0)
2016–2018	Nykøbing	66	(4)
2019–2023	Silkeborg	75	(5)
2023–2026	Hvidovre	21	(1)

International career
2014	Denmark U18	3	(0)
- * Club domestic league appearances and goals as of 29 May 2025

Mads Kaalund Larsen (born 16 August 1996) is a Danish professional footballer who plays as a midfielder.

== Career ==
=== Lyngby ===
Kaalund started his career with Lyngby. He made his professional debut on 26 March 2015, starting in a 0–0 draw against Brønshøj in the Danish 1st Division.

=== Nykøbing ===
On 14 July 2016, Lyngby announced Kaalund's departure as he opted to join newly promoted Danish 1st Division club Nykøbing. In June 2018, he extended his contract with Nykøbing until 2019 after two successful seasons at the club, during which he made his breakthrough.

=== Silkeborg ===
On 1 July 2019, Kaalund made the move to Silkeborg from Nykøbing, shortly after Silkeborg's promotion to the Danish Superliga. The agreement with the technically skilled central midfielder had been finalised six months earlier.

He terminated his contract with Silkeborg by mutual consent on 29 June 2023. During his four seasons at the club, he had scored five goals in 89 total appearances.

=== Hvidovre ===
On 29 June 2023, the same day he terminated his contract with Silkeborg, Kaalund joined newly promoted Superliga club Hvidovre.
