= Oliver Lund =

Danish footballer (born 1990)

Personal information
- Full name: Oliver Lund Jensen
- Birth name: Oliver Lund Poulsen
- Date of birth: 21 August 1990 (age 36)
- Place of birth: Herlev, Denmark
- Height: 1.87 m (6 ft 2 in)
- Position: Full-back

Youth career
- Herlev IF
- –2008: AB

Senior career*
Years	Team	Apps	(Gls)
2008–2013	AB	81	(6)
2013–2015	Vestsjælland	49	(1)
2015–2017	OB	46	(0)
2017–2019	Lyngby	31	(0)
2019–2021	OB	61	(4)
2021–2023	AGF	28	(0)
- * Club domestic league appearances and goals

Oliver Lund Jensen (born 21 August 1990) is a Danish retired professional footballer who played as a full-back.

== Club career ==
=== Vestsjælland ===
He played his first game in the Danish Superliga, and got his debut for FCV against Brøndby IF the 21 July 2013, the game ended 1-1.

=== OB ===
On 22 June 2015 it was confirmed, that Lund signed OB on a 2-year contract. He left the club in the summer 2017, as his contract expired.

=== Lyngby ===
Lund signed for Lyngby Boldklub on 27 June 2017.

=== Return to OB ===
On 25 January 2019, Lund re-joined Odense Boldklub on a one-and-a-half-year contract.

=== AGF ===
On 16 June 2021, Lund joined AGF on a one-year contract. On 26 June 2023, 32-year old Lund confirmed on his social media, that he had decided to retire from football.
