= 2023–24 Odense Boldklub season =

Odense Boldklub
2023–24 season
- Chairman: Niels Thorborg
- Manager: Andreas Alm
- Stadium: Nature Energy Park
- Danish Superliga: 9th
- Danish Cup: Fourth round
- Top goalscorer: League: Louicius Don Deedson (7 goals); All: Louicius Don Deedson (7 goals)
Home colours	Away colours	Third colours

The 2023–24 Odense Boldklub season is the club's 135th season, and their 62nd appearance in the Danish Superliga.

== First team ==
Last updated on 1 February 2024

Squad no.	Name	Nationality	Position(s)	Date of birth (age)
Goalkeepers
1	Martin Hansen	(Denmark)	GK	15 June 1990 (age 36)
13	Hans Christian Bernat	(Denmark)	GK	13 November 2000 (age 26)
27	Magnus Nielsen	(Denmark)	GK	4 August 2004 (age 22)
—	Viljar Myhra	(Norway)	GK	21 July 1996 (age 30)
Defenders
2	Nicholas Mickelson	(Thailand)	RB	24 July 1999 (age 27)
3	Nicklas Mouritsen	(Denmark)	LB	15 March 1995 (age 31)
4	Bjørn Paulsen	(Denmark)	CB	2 July 1991 (age 35)
5	Mihajlo Ivančević	(Serbia)	CB	7 April 1999 (age 27)
14	Gustav Grubbe	(Denmark)	RB	3 January 2003 (age 23)
20	Leeroy Owusu	(Ghana)	RB	13 August 1996 (age 30)
23	Aske Adelgaard	(Denmark)	LB	10 November 2003 (age 23)
24	Yaya Bojang	(The Gambia)	CB/CDM	10 September 2004 (age 22)
25	Filip Helander	(Sweden)	CB	22 April 1993 (age 33)
28	Tobias Slotsager	(Denmark)	CB	1 January 2006 (age 20)
29	James Gomez	(The Gambia)	CB	14 November 2001 (age 25)
Midfielders
6	Sven Köhler	(Germany)	CDM	8 November 1996 (age 30)
8	Alasana Manneh	(The Gambia)	CDM	8 April 1998 (age 28)
11	Markus Jensen	(Denmark)	AM/LW	15 July 2005 (age 21)
15	Tom Trybull	(Germany)	CM	9 March 1993 (age 33)
18	Max Ejdum	(Denmark)	CM	15 October 2004 (age 22)
22	Rami Al Hajj	(Sweden)	AM	17 September 2001 (age 25)
Forwards
9	Bashkim Kadrii	(Denmark)	ST	9 July 1991 (age 35)
10	Louicius Don Deedson	(Haiti)	LW/RW	11 February 2001 (age 25)
17	Luca Kjerrumgaard	(Denmark)	ST	3 February 2003 (age 23)
19	Johannes Selvén	(Sweden)	RW	26 July 2003 (age 23)
21	Charly Nouck Horneman	(Denmark)	LW/RW/ST	21 March 2004 (age 22)
26	Agon Muçolli	(Albania)	LW	26 September 1998 (age 28)
30	Max Fenger	(Denmark)	ST	7 August 2001 (age 25)

== Transfers ==
=== Transfers in ===
Entry date	Position	No.	Player	From club	Fee	Ref.
1 July 2023	MF	18	(Denmark) Max Ejdum	Youth academy		
1 July 2023	FW	7	(Sierra Leone) Mohamed Buya Turay	Without club	Free transfer	
1 July 2023	MF	22	(Sweden) Rami Al Hajj	(Netherlands) Heerenveen	Free transfer	
1 July 2023	FW	19	(Sweden) Johannes Selvén	(Sweden) Göteborg	Free transfer	
1 July 2023	DF	20	(Ghana) Leeroy Owusu	(Netherlands) Willem II	Free transfer	
1 July 2023	DF	16	(Finland) Sauli Väisänen	(Italy) Cosenza	Free transfer	
1 July 2023	FW	30	(Haiti) Louicius Don Deedson	(Denmark) Hobro	Free transfer	
1 July 2023	MF	6	(Germany) Sven Köhler	(Germany) Osnabrück	5,625,000 DKK	
10 August 2023	MF	11	(Denmark) Markus Jensen	Youth academy		
16 August 2023	FW	29	(England) Tyler Burey	(England) Millwall	Undisclosed	
17 August 2023	DF	3	(Denmark) Nicklas Mouritsen	(Denmark) Helsingør	Undisclosed	
31 August 2023	DF	26	(Sweden) Filip Helander	(Scotland) Rangers	Free transfer	
30 September 2023	MF	15	(Germany) Tom Trybull	Without club	Free transfer	
1 January 2024	FW	30	(Denmark) Max Fenger	(Sweden) Mjällby	Back from loan	
1 January 2024	FW	17	(Denmark) Luca Kjerrumgaard	(Norway) Stabæk	Back from loan	
1 January 2024	FW	26	(Albania) Agon Muçolli	(Sweden) Varbergs BoIS	Back from loan	
9 January 2024	DF	24	(The Gambia) Yaya Bojang	Youth academy		
31 January 2024	GK	—	(Norway) Viljar Myhra	(Norway) Strømsgodset	6,700,000 DKK	
1 February 2024	DF	29	(The Gambia) James Gomez	(Czech Republic) Sparta Prague	7,500,000 DKK	
Total					19,825,000 DKK	

=== Transfers out ===
Departure date	Position	No.	Player	To club	Fee	Ref.
30 June 2023	FW	3	(Tunisia) Omar Jebali	(Tunisia) ES Zarzis	Return from loan	
30 June 2023	GK	—	(Ivory Coast) Sayouba Mandé		End of contract	
30 June 2023	DF	16	(Norway) Jørgen Skjelvik	(Cyprus) Apollon Limassol	End of contract	
30 June 2023	MF	7	(Finland) Naatan Skyttä	(France) Toulouse	Return from loan	
30 June 2023	MF	19	(Iceland) Aron Thrándarson	(Iceland) Víkingur Reykjavík	End of contract	
30 June 2023	MF	6	(Denmark) Jeppe Tverskov	(Denmark) Nordsjælland	End of contract	
30 June 2023	FW	17	(Denmark) Kenneth Zohore		End of contract	
30 June 2023	FW	30	(The Gambia) Yankuba Minteh	(England) Newcastle United	52,500,000 DKK	
30 June 2023	MF	8	(Denmark) Jakob Breum	(Netherlands) Go Ahead Eagles	2,000,000 DKK	
30 June 2023	DF	—	(Australia) Joel King	(Australia) Sydney	Free transfer	
11 July 2023	MF	29	(Denmark) Mads Frøkjær-Jensen	(England) Preston North End	10,000,000 DKK	
10 August 2023	MF	11	(United States) Emmanuel Sabbi	(France) Le Havre	15,000,000 DKK	
30 January 2024	FW	7	(Sierra Leone) Mohamed Buya Turay	(United States) Birmingham Legion	Undisclosed	
Total					79,500,000 DKK	

=== Loans out ===
Start date	End date	Position	No.	Player	From club	Ref
1 July 2023	31 May 2024	DF	—	(Denmark) Christian Vestergaard	(Denmark) Kolding	
30 August 2023	31 December 2023	MF	26	(Albania) Agon Muçolli	(Sweden) Varbergs BoIS	
31 August 2023	31 December 2023	FW	17	(Denmark) Luca Kjerrumgaard	(Norway) Stabæk	
2 September 2023	31 May 2024	MF	10	(Italy) Franco Tongya	(Cyprus) AEK Larnaca	
10 January 2024	31 May 2024	FW	29	(England) Tyler Burey	(England) Oxford United	
12 January 2024	31 May 2024	MF	24	(Bosnia and Herzegovina) Alen Mustafić	(Poland) Śląsk Wrocław	
18 January 2024	31 May 2024	DF	16	(Finland) Sauli Väisänen	(Italy) Ascoli	

=== Transfer summary ===
Spending

Summer: ▼5,625,000 DKK

Winter: ▼14,200,000 DKK

Total: ▼19,825,000 DKK

Income

Summer: ▲79,500,000 DKK

Winter: 0,000,000 DKK

Total: ▲79,500,000 DKK

Net Expenditure

Summer: ▲73,875,000 DKK

Winter: ▼14,200,000 DKK

Total: ▲59,675,000 DKK

=== New contracts ===
Date	Pos	No.	Player	Ref.
1 July 2023	GK	1	(Denmark) Martin Hansen	

== Friendlies ==
=== Pre-season ===
Win Draw Loss Fixtures

4 July 2023 Friendly	Odense (Denmark)	2–1	(Denmark) Vejle	Odense
12:00 CEST				Stadium: Ådalen

9 July 2023 Friendly	Odense (Denmark)	4–0	(Denmark) Viborg	Odense
13:00 CEST				Stadium: Nature Energy Park

15 July 2023 Friendly	Twente (Netherlands)	7–1	(Denmark) Odene	Enschede
15:00 CEST

== Competitions ==
=== Superliga ===
==== League table ====
Pos	Team	Pld	W	D	L	GF	GA	GD	Pts	Qualification
5	AGF	22	9	9	4	26	21	+5	36	Qualification for the Championship round
6	Silkeborg	22	8	3	11	28	32	−4	27	Qualification for the Championship round
7	OB	22	6	6	10	25	32	−7	24	Qualification for the Relegation round
8	Lyngby	22	6	5	11	27	39	−12	23	Qualification for the Relegation round
9	Viborg	22	6	5	11	24	37	−13	23	Qualification for the Relegation round

Source: Danish Football Association (in Danish), Soccerway
Rules for classification: 1) Points; 2) Goal difference; 3) Goals scored; 4) Away goals scored; 5) Play-off (played on neutral ground if determining teams for different rounds); 6) Draw.

==== Results summary ====
Overall								Home						Away					
Pld	W	D	L	GF	GA	GD	Pts	W	D	L	GF	GA	GD	W	D	L	GF	GA	GD
17	4	5	8	21	25	−4	17	0	3	6	8	17	−9	4	2	2	13	8	+5

Last updated: 3 December 2023.
Source: Worldfootball.net

==== Results by round ====
Matchday	1	2	3	4	5	6	7	8	9	10	11	12	13	14	15	16	17	18	19	20	21	22
Ground	H	A	H	A	H	A	H	H	A	H	A	H	A	A	H	A	H	A	H	A	A	H
Result	D	W	L	L	D	W	L	L	L	L	W	L	D	D	L	W	D					
Position	6	4	6	8	9	7	7	9	10	10	10	10	10	10	10	9	9					

Updated to match(es) played on 3 December 2023. Source: Worldfootball.net
A = Away; H = Home; W = Win; D = Draw; L = Loss

==== Matches ====
Win Draw Loss Fixtures

23 July 2023 1	Odense	2–2	Randers	Odense
16:00 CEST	Al Hajj 26' (pen.); Turay 37'; Manneh (yellow card) 62'	Report	Odey 10'; Dammers (yellow card) 22'; Carlgren (yellow card) 25'; Andersson 90+5'	Stadium: Nature Energy Park; Attendance: 7,755; Referee: Jacob Karlsen

30 July 2023 2	Brøndby	1–2	Odense	Brøndbyøster
18:00 CEST	Vallys 54'	Report	Adelgaard (yellow card) 26'; Manneh (yellow card) 41', (goal) 63'; Al Hajj (yellow card) 88'; Kadrii 90+5'	Stadium: Brøndby Stadium; Attendance: 22,734; Referee: Jakob Sundberg

7 August 2023 3	Odense	1–2	Viborg	Odense
19:00 CEST	Adelgaard (yellow card) 8'; Köhler (yellow card) 16'; Kadrii 72'	Report	Ementa 27', (yellow card) 77'; Grønning (yellow card) 39'; Thomas 80'; Bundgaard (yellow card) 83'	Stadium: Nature Energy Park; Attendance: 10,105; Referee: Mikkel Redder

11 August 2023 4	Copenhagen	2–1	Odense	Copenhagen
19:00 CEST	Achouri (yellow card) 74', (goal) 90'; Lerager 77'	Report	Owusu (yellow card) 9'; Horneman 57'	Stadium: Parken Stadium; Attendance: 25,215; Referee: Jacob Karlsen

20 August 2023 5	Odense	1–1	AGF	Odense
20:00 CEST	Manneh (yellow card) 26'; Mickelson 38'; Al Hajj (yellow card) 84'	Report	Mortensen 2'; Bech (yellow card) 39'; Knudsen (yellow card) 52'; Beijmo (yellow card) 64'	Stadium: Nature Energy Park; Attendance: 9,577; Referee: Aydın Uslu

27 August 2023 6	Hvidovre	1–5	Odense	Hvidovre
16:00 CEST	Jakobsen 65'	Report	Selvén 65'; Don Deedson 51', 60'; Kadrii 85'; Tongya 90+5'	Stadium: Hvidovre Stadium; Attendance: 4,228; Referee: Lasse Læbel Graagaard

1 September 2023 7	Odense	1–2	Vejle	Odense
19:00 CEST	Don Deedson 14'; Köhler (yellow card) 90+5'	Report	Lauritsen 20'; Assehnoun 82', (yellow card) 86'; Albentosa (yellow card) 90+1'; Ezatolahi (yellow card) 90+1'; Kolinger (yellow card) 90+5'	Stadium: Nature Energy Park; Attendance: 11.271; Referee: Mogens Krogh

18 September 2023 8	Odense	0–3	Silkeborg	Odense
19:00 CEST		Report		Stadium: Nature Energy Park

24 September 2023 9	Midtjylland	2–1	Odense	Herning
18:00 CEST		Report		Stadium: MCH Arena

2 October 2023 10	Odense	1–2	Lyngby	Odense
19:00 CEST		Report		Stadium: Nature Energy Park

8 October 2023 11	Nordsjælland	0–1	Odense	Farum
14:00 CEST		Report		Stadium: Right to Dream Park

23 October 2023 12	Odense	1–2	Midtjylland	Odense
19:00 CEST		Report		Stadium: Nature Energy Park

29 October 2023 13	Silkeborg	0–0	Odense	Silkeborg
16:00 CET		Report		Stadium: JYSK Park

4 November 2023 14	Lyngby	2–2	Odense	Kongens Lyngby
16:30 CET		Report		Stadium: Lyngby Stadium

12 November 2023 15	Odense	0–2	Hvidovre	Odense
18:00 CET		Report		Stadium: Nature Energy Park

26 November 2023 16	Randers	0–1	Odense	Randers
16:00 CET		Report		Stadium: Cepheus Park Randers

3 December 2023 17	Odense	1–1	Nordsjælland	Odense
14:00 CET		Report		Stadium: Nature Energy Park

=== Danish Cup ===
7 September 2023 Second round	Tune	0–5	Odense	Tune
17:00 CEST		Report	Turay 19'; Owusu 66'; Al Hajj 67'; Selvén 69'; Mouritsen 79'	Stadium: Tune Stadion; Referee: Benjamin Svedborg

27 September 2023 Third round	Hobro	0–1	Odense	Hobro
17:00 CEST	Yoda (yellow card) 90+2'; Jacobsen (yellow card) 90+2'	Report	Turay 19'	Stadium: DS Arena; Referee: Morten Krogh

1 November 2023 Fourth round	Fredericia	3–1	Odense	Fredericia
20:00 CEST	Røjkjær 8'; Jakobsen 28'; Berger (yellow card) 49'; Bach 52', (yellow card) 82'; Jessen (yellow card) 72'	Report	Mouritsen (yellow card) 44'; Köhler (yellow card) 45'; Adelgaard (yellow card) 90+3'; Owusu 90+4'	Stadium: Monjasa Park; Referee: Jacob Karlsen

== Squad statistics ==
=== Goalscorers ===
Includes all competitive matches. The list is sorted by shirt number when total goals are equal.

As of match played 3 December 2023

Rank	Pos.	No.	Player	Superliga	Danish Cup	Total
1	FW	30	Louicius Don Deedson	7	0	7
2	FW	9	Bashkim Kadrii	5	0	5
3	FW	7	Mohamed Buya Turay	1	2	3
3	MF	22	Rami Al Hajj	2	1	3
5	FW	19	Johannes Selvén	1	1	2
5	DF	20	Leeroy Owusu	0	2	2
7	DF	2	Nicholas Mickelson	1	0	1
7	DF	3	Nicklas Mouritsen	0	1	1
7	MF	8	Alasana Manneh	1	0	1
7	FW	21	Charly Nouck Horneman	1	0	1
7	DF	28	Tobias Slotsager	1	0	1
7	MF	—	Franco Tongya	1	0	1
Own goals				0	0	0
TOTALS				21	7	28
