= 2022–23 Odense Boldklub season =

Odense Boldklub
2022–23 season
- Chairman: Niels Thorborg
- Manager: Andreas Alm
- Stadium: Nature Energy Park
- Danish Superliga: 8th
- Danish Cup: Second round
- Top goalscorer: League: Mads Frøkjær-Jensen (8 goals); Bashkim Kadrii; Emmanuel Sabbi; All: Mads Frøkjær-Jensen (8 goals); Bashkim Kadrii; Emmanuel Sabbi
| Home colours | Away colours | Third colours |

The 2022–23 Odense Boldklub season was the club's 134th season, and their 61st appearance in the Danish Superliga.

== First team ==
Last updated on 23 March 2023

| Squad no. | Name | Nationality | Position | Date of birth (age) |
Goalkeepers
| 1 | Martin Hansen (4th captain) | (Denmark) | GK | 15 June 1990 (aged 32) |
| 13 | Hans Christian Bernat | (Denmark) | GK | 13 November 2000 (aged 22) |
| 27 | Magnus Nielsen | (Denmark) | GK | 4 August 2004 (aged 18) |
Defenders
| 2 | Nicholas Mickelson | (Thailand) | RB | 24 July 1999 (aged 23) |
| 3 | Omar Jebali | (Tunisia) | CB | 19 February 2000 (aged 23) |
| 4 | Bjørn Paulsen (3rd captain) | (Denmark) | CB | 2 July 1991 (aged 31) |
| 14 | Gustav Grubbe | (Denmark) | RB | 3 January 2003 (aged 20) |
| 16 | Jørgen Skjelvik | (Norway) | LB | 5 July 1991 (aged 31) |
| 22 | Mihajlo Ivančević | (Serbia) | CB | 7 April 1999 (aged 24) |
| 23 | Aske Adelgaard | (Denmark) | LB | 10 November 2003 (aged 19) |
| 28 | Tobias Slotsager (5th captain) | (Denmark) | CB | 1 January 2006 (aged 17) |
Midfielders
| 5 | Alasana Manneh | (The Gambia) | CM/CDM | 8 April 1998 (aged 25) |
| 6 | Jeppe Tverskov (captain) | (Denmark) | CB | 12 March 1993 (aged 30) |
| 7 | Naatan Skyttä | (Finland) | AM | 7 May 2002 (aged 21) |
| 8 | Jakob Breum | (Denmark) | LM | 17 November 2003 (aged 19) |
| 10 | Franco Tongya | (Italy) | AM | 13 March 2002 (aged 21) |
| 19 | Aron Elís Thrándarson | (Iceland) | CM | 10 November 1994 (aged 28) |
| 24 | Alen Mustafić | (Bosnia and Herzegovina) | CM | 5 July 1999 (aged 23) |
| 29 | Mads Frøkjær-Jensen | (Denmark) | AM/LW | 29 July 1999 (aged 23) |
Forwards
| 9 | Bashkim Kadrii (vice-captain) | (Denmark) | ST | 9 July 1991 (aged 31) |
| 11 | Emmanuel Sabbi | (United States) | LW/RW | 24 December 1997 (aged 25) |
| 17 | Kenneth Zohore | (Denmark) | ST | 31 January 1994 (aged 29) |
| 18 | Musa Juwara | (The Gambia) | ST | 26 December 2001 (aged 21) |
| 21 | Charly Nouck Horneman | (Denmark) | ST | 21 March 2004 (aged 19) |
| 26 | Agon Muçolli | (Albania) | LW | 26 September 1998 (aged 24) |
| 30 | Yankuba Minteh | (The Gambia) | LW/RW | 22 July 2004 (aged 18) |

== Transfers ==
=== Transfers in ===
| Entry date | Position | No. | Player | From club | Fee | Ref. |
|---|---|---|---|---|---|---|
| 1 July 2022 | DF | 14 | (Denmark) Gustav Grubbe | (Germany) Leipzig | | |
| 1 July 2022 | ST | 17 | (Denmark) Luca Kjerrumgaard | Youth academy | | |
| 7 July 2022 | ST | 21 | (Denmark) Charly Nouck Horneman | Youth academy | | |
| 8 July 2022 | FW | 26 | (Albania) Agon Muçolli | (Norway) Kristiansund | | |
| 11 July 2022 | DF | 4 | (Denmark) Bjørn Paulsen | (Sweden) Hammarby | | |
| 31 July 2022 | DF | 23 | (Denmark) Aske Adelgaard | Youth academy | | |
| 1 August 2022 | MM | 1 | (Denmark) Martin Hansen | (Germany) Hannover | Free transfer | |
| 12 August 2022 | DF | 28 | (Denmark) Tobias Slotsager | Youth academy | | |
| 30 August 2022 | MF | 10 | (Italy) Franco Tongya | (France) Marseille | Free transfer | |
| 31 August 2022 | MF | 5 | (The Gambia) Alasana Manneh | (Poland) Górnik Zabrze | | |
| 27 October 2022 | FW | 30 | (The Gambia) Yankuba Minteh | Youth academy | | |
| 27 October 2022 | MF | 24 | (Bosnia and Herzegovina) Alen Mustafić | (Slovakia) Slovan Bratislava | | |
| 31 January 2023 | FW | 17 | (Denmark) Kenneth Zohore | (England) West Bromwich | Free transfer | |
| Total | | | | | | |

=== Loans in ===
| Start date | End date | Position | No. | Player | From club | Ref |
|---|---|---|---|---|---|---|
| 1 July 2022 | 20 December 2022 (Note: Contract dissolved. Original end date was 30 June 2023.) | FW | 18 | (Guinea) Mohamed Kanté | (Guinea) Hafia | |
| 19 July 2022 | 30 June 2023 | DF | 3 | (Tunisia) Omar Jebali | (Tunisia) Zarzis | |
| 31 August 2022 | 31 December 2022 | MF | 24 | (Sweden) Armin Gigović | (Russia) Rostov | |
| 19 January 2023 | 8 June 2023 (Note: Contract dissolved. Original end date was 31 December 2023.) | FW | 18 | (The Gambia) Musa Juwara | (Italy) Bologna | |
| 31 January 2023 | 30 June 2023 | MF | 7 | (Finland) Naatan Skyttä | (France) Toulouse | |

=== Transfers out ===
| Departure date | Position | No. | Player | To club | Fee | Ref. |
|---|---|---|---|---|---|---|
| 30 June 2022 | FW | 26 | (Denmark) Mikkel Hyllegaard | (Denmark) SønderjyskE | End of contract | |
| 30 June 2022 | MF | 21 | (Denmark) Tarik Ibrahimagic | (Denmark) Næstved | End of contract | |
| 30 June 2022 | DF | 4 | (Denmark) Ryan Johnson Laursen | (Denmark) SønderjyskE | End of contract | |
| 30 June 2022 | FW | — | (Denmark) Rasmus Nissen | (Faroe Islands) Tórshavn | End of contract | |
| 30 June 2022 | FW | — | (Uganda) Moses Opondo | (Denmark) Horsens | | |
| 30 June 2022 | MF | 14 | (Denmark) Jens Jakob Thomasen | (France) Nîmes | End of contract | |
| 5 July 2022 | DF | 18 | (Denmark) Mathias Brems | (Denmark) Helsingør | | |
| 31 July 2022 | DF | — | (Denmark) Alexander Juel Andersen | (Norway) Aalesund | | |
| 23 August 2022 | FW | 24 | (Norway) Robin Østrøm | (Denmark) Silkeborg | 1,500,000 DKK | |
| 29 August 2022 | FW | 10 | (Norway) Sander Svendsen | (Norway) Viking | | |
| 12 January 2023 | DF | 5 | (Denmark) Kasper Larsen | (Hungary) Fehérvár | | |
| 19 January 2023 | FW | 7 | (Tunisia) Issam Jebali | (Japan) Gamba Osaka | 7,500,000 DKK | |
| 31 January 2023 | FW | 20 | (Denmark) Ayo Simon Okosun | (Denmark) Vendsyssel | | |
| 31 January 2023 | FW | — | (Denmark) Tobias Augustinus-Jensen (U19) | (Netherlands) Utrecht | | |
| Total | | | | | 9,000,000 DKK | |

=== Loans out ===
| Start date | End date | Position | No. | Player | From club | Ref |
|---|---|---|---|---|---|---|
| 1 July 2022 | 30 June 2023 | DF | 28 | (Denmark) Christian Vestergaard | (Denmark) Kolding | |
| 4 July 2022 | 30 June 2023 | DF | 17 | (Thailand) Jonathan Khemdee | (Denmark) Næstved | |
| 8 July 2022 | 30 June 2024 | MF | 23 | (Denmark) Troels Kløve | (Denmark) SønderjyskE | |
| 1 August 2022 | 30 June 2023 | GK | 30 | (Ivory Coast) Sayouba Mandé | (Denmark) Helsingør | |
| 15 August 2022 | 12 January 2023 | DF | 5 | (Denmark) Kasper Larsen | (Hungary) Fehérvár | |
| 31 August 2022 | 30 June 2023 | FW | 17 | (Denmark) Luca Kjerrumgaard | (Denmark) Nykøbing | |
| 31 January 2023 | 30 June 2023 | DF | 25 | (Australia) Joel King | (Australia) Sydney | |
| 23 March 2023 | 31 July 2023 | FW | 15 | (Denmark) Max Fenger | (Sweden) Mjällby | |

== Friendlies ==
=== Pre-season ===
OB played three training games in Denmark before the start of the 2022–23 Superliga season. OB had a terrible prelude to the season by losing all three training games.

Win Draw Loss Fixtures

| 25 June 2022 Friendly | Midtjylland (Denmark) | 3–2 | (Denmark) Odense | Tarm |
| 13:00 CEST | Fenger 25'; Horneman 34' | Report | Sisto 50'; Lind 58'; Moses 89' | Stadium: Tarm Stadion |

| 2 July 2022 Friendly | Odense (Denmark) | 1–3 | (Denmark) Horsens | Odense |
| 13:00 CEST | | | | Stadium: Ådalen |

| 9 July 2022 Friendly | Odense (Denmark) | 2–3 | (Denmark) Vejle | Odense |
| 13:00 CEST | | | | Stadium: Ådalen |

=== Winter season ===
Due to the 2022 FIFA World Cup, the winter off-season was longer than usual. Therefore, OB had a three month long training camp starting off with six games in Denmark. Afterwards the club went on training camp to Bangkok for two weeks just before the start of the spring season of the Superliga.

Win Draw Loss Fixtures

| 17 November 2022 Friendly | Odense (Denmark) | 3–2 | (Denmark) Nykøbing | Odense |
| 13:00 CEST | | | | Stadium: Ådalen |

| 23 November 2022 Friendly | Nordsjælland (Denmark) | 1–2 | (Denmark) Odense | Farum |
| 13:00 CEST | | | | Stadium: Right to Dream Park |

| 1 December 2022 Friendly | Lyngby (Denmark) | 1–2 | (Denmark) Odense | Kongens Lyngby |
| 13:00 CEST | | | | Stadium: Lyngby Stadium |

| 14 January 2023 Friendly | Næstved (Denmark) | 0–1 | (Denmark) Odense | Næstved |
| 13:00 CEST | | | Minteh 1'; Ivančević (red card) 36' | Stadium: Maglemølle Storhal |

| 21 January 2023 Friendly | Nordsjælland (Denmark) | 4–0 | (Denmark) Odense | Farum |
| 13:00 CEST | | | | Stadium: Right to Dream Park |

| 27 January 2023 Friendly | Midtjylland (Denmark) | 4–2 | (Denmark) Odense | Ikast |
| 12:00 CEST | Olsson 14'; Heiselberg 32' 42'; Isaksen 60' | | Tongya 112' (pen.); Muçolli 117' | Stadium: Ikast Stadium |

| 3 February 2023 Friendly | (Malaysia) Sabah | 0–1 | (Denmark) Odense | Bangkok, Thailand |
| 18:30 CEST | | | | Stadium: BG Training Centre |

| 7 February 2023 Friendly | (Thailand) Nakhon Pathom United | 1–5 | (Denmark) Odense | Bangkok, Thailand |
| 18:30 CEST | | | | Stadium: BG Training Centre |

| 12 February 2023 Friendly | (Malaysia) Terengganu | 0–2 | (Denmark) Odense | Bangkok, Thailand |
| 18:30 CEST | | | | Stadium: BG Training Centre |

== Competitions ==
=== Superliga ===
==== League table ====
| Pos | Team | Pld | W | D | L | GF | GA | GD | Pts | Qualification |
|---|---|---|---|---|---|---|---|---|---|---|
| 7 | Silkeborg | 22 | 8 | 5 | 9 | 34 | 35 | −1 | 29 | Qualification for the Qualification round |
| 8 | Midtjylland | 22 | 6 | 10 | 6 | 32 | 29 | +3 | 28 | Qualification for the Qualification round |
| 9 | OB | 22 | 7 | 7 | 8 | 27 | 38 | −11 | 28 | Qualification for the Qualification round |
| 10 | Horsens | 22 | 6 | 5 | 11 | 26 | 37 | −11 | 23 | Qualification for the Qualification round |
| 11 | Lyngby | 22 | 3 | 7 | 12 | 21 | 36 | −15 | 16 | Qualification for the Qualification round |

Source: Danish Football Association (in Danish), Soccerway
Rules for classification: 1) Points; 2) Goal difference; 3) Goals scored; 4) Away goals scored; 5) Play-off (played on neutral ground if determining teams for different rounds); 6) Draw.

==== Results summary ====
| Overall | | | | | | | | Home | | | | | | Away | | | | | |
| Pld | W | D | L | GF | GA | GD | Pts | W | D | L | GF | GA | GD | W | D | L | GF | GA | GD |
|---|---|---|---|---|---|---|---|---|---|---|---|---|---|---|---|---|---|---|---|
| 22 | 7 | 7 | 8 | 27 | 38 | −11 | 28 | 4 | 3 | 4 | 13 | 16 | −3 | 3 | 4 | 4 | 14 | 22 | −8 |

Last updated: 19 March 2023.
Source: Worldfootball.net

==== Results by round ====
| Matchday | 1 | 2 | 3 | 4 | 5 | 6 | 7 | 8 | 9 | 10 | 11 | 12 | 13 | 14 | 15 | 16 | 17 | 18 | 19 | 20 | 21 | 22 |
|---|---|---|---|---|---|---|---|---|---|---|---|---|---|---|---|---|---|---|---|---|---|---|
| Ground | H | A | H | H | A | H | A | H | H | A | A | H | A | H | A | H | A | H | A | A | H | A |
| Result | L | D | L | L | L | W | W | L | W | W | D | D | D | W | W | D | D | D | L | L | W | L |
| Position | 12 | 11 | 12 | 12 | 12 | 11 | 9 | 11 | 10 | 8 | 9 | 10 | 9 | 6 | 4 | 5 | 5 | 6 | 9 | 9 | 8 | 9 |

Updated to match(es) played on 19 March 2023. Source: Worldfootball.net
A = Away; H = Home; W = Win; D = Draw; L = Loss

==== Matches ====
Win Draw Loss Fixtures

| 18 July 2022 1 | Odense | 0–2 | Nordsjælland | Odense |
| 19:00 CEST | Paulsen (yellow card) 76'; King (yellow card) 80' | Report | Nuamah 3'; Christensen (yellow card) 11'; Nagalo (yellow card) 26'; Frese (yellow card) 39'; Schjelderup 86' | Stadium: Nature Energy Park; Attendance: 6,773; Referee: Jens Maae |

| 24 July 2022 2 | Randers | 2–2 | Odense | Randers |
| 14:00 CEST | Andersson (yellow card) 47'; Egho 75'; Bundgaard 78' | Report | Kadrii 29'; Horneman 45' | Stadium: Cepheus Park Randers; Attendance: 4,004; Referee: Mikkel Redder |

| 29 July 2022 3 | Odense | 1–5 | Midtjylland | Odense |
| 19:00 CEST | | Report | | Stadium: Nature Energy Park; Attendance: 6,164; Referee: Jørgen Daugbjerg Burchardt |

| 7 August 2022 4 | Odense | 1–2 | Aarhus | Odense |
| 18:00 CEST | Kadrii (yellow card) 20'; Østrøm 38'; Horneman (yellow card) 42' | Report | Mortensen 9', 87' (pen.); Grønbæk (yellow card) 12'; D'Alberto (yellow card) 90' | Stadium: Nature Energy Park; Attendance: 5,865; Referee: Morten Krogh |

| 14 August 2022 5 | Brøndby | 2–0 | Odense | Copenhagen |
| 18:00 CEST | Radošević 13'; Schwartau 32'; Divković (yellow card) 60'; Wass (yellow card) 65' | Report | Paulsen (yellow card) 13'; King (yellow card) 43'; Thrándarson (yellow card) 68'; Mickelson (yellow card) 74' | Stadium: Brøndby Stadium; Attendance: 17,946; Referee: Jonas Hansen |

| 22 August 2022 6 | Odense | 1–0 | Horsens | Odense |
| 19:00 CEST | Fenger (yellow card) 48'; Adelgaard (yellow card) 53' (yellow-red card) 90+3'; Kadrii 84' | Report | Gomez (yellow card) 21'; Santos (yellow card) 28'; Jensen (yellow card) 88' | Stadium: Nature Energy Park; Attendance: 7,567; Referee: Jørgen Daugbjerg Burchardt |

| 28 August 2022 7 | Silkeborg | 1–2 | Odense | Silkeborg |
| 18:00 CEST | Jørgensen 22'; Vallys (yellow card) 90+1'; Felix (yellow card) 90+3' | Report | Kadrii 43'; Frøkjær-Jensen 90+3' (pen.) | Stadium: Jysk Park; Attendance: 4,087; Referee: Mads-Kristoffer Kristoffersen |

| 4 September 2022 8 | Odense | 1–2 | Viborg | Odense |
| 14:00 CEST | Kadrii 32'; Mickelson (yellow card) 35'; Frøkjær-Jensen (yellow card) 77' | Report | Said (yellow card) 53'; Grot 66'; Bundgaard 80' | Stadium: Nature Energy Park; Attendance: 12,437; Referee: Peter Kjærsgaard-Andersen |

| 10 September 2022 9 | Odense | 2–1 | Copenhagen | Odense |
| 19:00 CEST | Ivančević (yellow card) 25'; Jebali 44'; Minteh 86'; Kadrii (yellow card) 89'; Grubbe (yellow card) 90+1' | Report | Frøkjær-Jensen 22' (o.g.); Falk (yellow card) 45'; Lerager (yellow card) 86'; Claesson (yellow card) 89'; Boilesen (yellow card) 90+4' | Stadium: Nature Energy Park; Attendance: 12,056; Referee: Jakob Kehlet |

| 18 September 2022 10 | Lyngby | 0–2 | Odense | Kongens Lyngby |
| 14:00 CEST | Kaastrup (yellow card) 38'; Chukwuani (yellow card) 41'; Hamalainen (yellow card) 90+5' | Report | Frøkjær-Jensen 13', (yellow card) 28'; Adelgaard (yellow card) 31'; Jebali 63'; Breum (yellow card) 79' | Stadium: Lyngby Stadium; Attendance: 4,758; Referee: Mikkel Redder |

| 30 September 2022 11 | Aalborg | 1–1 | Odense | Aalborg |
| 19:00 CEST | Kramer 19'; Bakiz (yellow card) 82'; Sousa (yellow card) 87' | Report | Kadrii 57' | Stadium: Aalborg Portland Park; Attendance: 7,759; Referee: Jens Maae |

| 9 October 2022 12 | Odense | 1–1 | Silkeborg | Odense |
| 16:00 CEST | Minteh (yellow card) 27'; Gigović 61' | Report | Engel (yellow card) 73'; Adamsen 83' | Stadium: Nature Energy Park; Attendance: 13,020; Referee: Jakob Kehlet |

| 16 October 2022 13 | Viborg | 0–0 | Odense | Viborg |
| 14:00 CEST | Said (yellow card) 21'; Søndergaard (yellow card) 79' | Report | Tverskov (yellow card) 35'; Jebali (yellow card) 87' | Stadium: Energi Viborg Arena; Attendance: 4,909; Referee: Sandi Putros |

| 21 October 2022 14 | Odense | 3–1 | Lyngby | Odense |
| 19:00 CEST | Paulsen 3'; Manneh 9', (yellow card) 36'; Gigović (yellow card) 24' (yellow-red card) 83'; Tongya 42'; Hansen (yellow card) 89' | Report | Westergaard (yellow card) 39'; Gytkjær 62' | Stadium: Nature Energy Park; Attendance: 8,104; Referee: Jørgen Daugbjerg Burchhardt |

| 31 October 2022 15 | Midtjylland | 1–2 | Odense | Herning |
| 19:00 CEST | Dreyer 53' (pen.) | Report | Tverskov (yellow card) 14'; Jebali 45+3' (pen.); Hansen (yellow card) 60'; Thándarson 90+4' | Stadium: MCH Arena; Attendance: 7,776; Referee: Aydin Uslu |

| 6 November 2022 16 | Odense | 1–1 | Brøndby | Odense |
| 18:00 CEST | Tongya (yellow card) 44'; Sabbi 82' | Report | Greve (yellow card) 8'; Omoijunafo 33'; Riveros (yellow card) 88' | Stadium: Nature Energy Park; Attendance: 14,546; Referee: Michael Tykgaard |

| 13 November 2022 17 | Horsens | 3–3 | Odense | Horsens |
| 14:00 CEST | Lassen (yellow card) 31'; Sigurdarson 33', (yellow card) 90+3'; Santos 37', 51' | Report | Sabbi 4'; Minteh 13', (yellow card) 73'; Jebali 55'; Hansen (yellow card) 90+3' | Stadium: CASA Arena Horsens; Attendance: 4,654; Referee: Mikkel Redder |

| 19 February 2023 18 | Odense | 0–0 | Randers | Odense |
| 14:00 CEST | Ivančević (yellow card) 31' | Report | Enggård (yellow card) 31'; Johansson (yellow card) 31' | Stadium: Nature Energy Park; Attendance: 9,600; Referee: Aydin Uslu |

| 24 February 2023 19 | Nordsjælland | 4–2 | Odense | Farum |
| 19:00 CEST | Faghir 28', 63'; Svensson (yellow card) 33'; Villadsen (yellow card) 57'; Nygren (yellow card) 69'; Nuamah 72'; Marcondes 80' | Report | Manneh (yellow card) 57'; Frøkjær-Jensen 42', (yellow card) 63'; Bernat (yellow card) 63'; Minteh (yellow card) 68'; Tverskov (yellow card) 69'; K. Hansen 86' (o.g.) | Stadium: Right to Dream Park; Attendance: 5,102; Referee: Jonas Hansen |

| 5 March 2023 20 | Copenhagen | 7–0 | Odense | Copenhagen |
| 18:00 CEST | Gonçalves 29' (pen.); Lerager 42', 83'; Daramy 48', 88'; Falk 53'; Haraldsson 56' | Report | Adelgaard (red card) 28'; Sabbi (yellow card) 37'; Ivančević (yellow card) 43' (yellow-red card) 62' | Stadium: Parken Stadium; Attendance: 24,706; Referee: Morten Krogh |

| 10 March 2023 21 | Odense | 2–1 | Aalborg | Odense |
| 19:00 CEST | Kadrii 33' (pen.); Manneh (yellow card) 36'; Tongya (yellow card) 45+1', (goal) 50' | Report | Kramer (yellow card) 73'; Granli 90+4' | Stadium: Nature Energy Park; Attendance: 9,013; Referee: Jakob Sundberg |

| 19 March 2023 22 | Aarhus | 1–0 | Odense | Aarhus |
| 15:00 CEST | Duelund (yellow card) 27'; Mortensen 37'; Beijmo (yellow card) 43'; Poulsen (yellow card) 46' (yellow-red card) 90'; Links (yellow card) 73'; Haugen (yellow card) 85' | Report | Grubbe (yellow card) 62'; Tverskov (yellow card) 77' | Stadium: Ceres Park; Attendance: 13,759; Referee: Peter Kjærsgaard-Andersen |

==== Relegation round ====
| Pos | Team | Pld | W | D | L | GF | GA | GD | Pts | Qualification or relegation | MID | ODE | SIL | LYN | ACH | AAB |
|---|---|---|---|---|---|---|---|---|---|---|---|---|---|---|---|---|
| 1 | Midtjylland (O) | 32 | 13 | 12 | 7 | 55 | 39 | +16 | 51 | Qualification for the European play-off match | — | 4–2 | 3–0 | 1–0 | 3–1 | 1–1 |
| 2 | OB | 32 | 12 | 10 | 10 | 47 | 53 | −6 | 46 | | 1–3 | — | 2–0 | 2–2 | 2–1 | 1–1 |
| 3 | Silkeborg | 32 | 11 | 8 | 13 | 44 | 49 | −5 | 41 | | 3–3 | 0–1 | — | 1–0 | 1–2 | 2–2 |
| 4 | Lyngby | 32 | 6 | 10 | 16 | 30 | 49 | −19 | 28 | | 2–1 | 0–4 | 1–1 | — | 2–1 | 2–1 |
| 5 | Horsens (R) | 32 | 7 | 7 | 18 | 33 | 58 | −25 | 28 | Relegation to Danish 1st Division | 0–2 | 2–2 | 0–1 | 0–0 | — | 0–4 |

Source: Danish Football Association (in Danish), Soccerway
Legend: Blue = home team win; Yellow = draw; Red = away team win.
Rules for classification: 1) Points; 2) Goal difference; 3) Goals scored; 4) Away goals scored; 5) Play-off (played on neutral ground if determining teams for different rounds); 6) Draw.
(O) Play-off winners; (R) Relegated

Win Draw Loss Fixtures

| 31 March 2023 23 | Odense | 1–3 | Midtjylland | Odense |
| 19:00 CEST | Tongya (yellow card) 7'; Sabbi 31', (yellow card) 36'; Paulsen (yellow card) 82'; Minteh (yellow card) 90+6' | Report | Heiselberg 10'; Juninho 14'; Gartenmann (yellow card) 84'; Chilufya 90+1' | Stadium: Nature Energy Park; Attendance: 7,864; Referee: Jakob Kehlet |

| 10 April 2023 24 | Aalborg | 2–3 | Odense | Aalborg |
| 14:00 CEST | Ahlmann (yellow card) 30'; Bakiz (yellow card) 30'; Prip 48'; Sousa 71' | Report | Tverskov 13'; Hansen (yellow card) 30'; Frøkjær-Jensen 39'; Minteh (yellow card) 53'; Kadrii 75' (pen.) | Stadium: Aalborg Portland Park; Attendance: 7,815; Referee: Lasse Graagaard |

| 16 April 2023 25 | Odense | 2–0 | Silkeborg | Odense |
| 14:00 CEST | Kadrii 54'; Skyttä 64' | Report | | Stadium: Nature Energy Park; Attendance: 9,023; Referee: Sandi Putros |

| 24 April 2023 26 | Odense | 2–2 | Lyngby | Odense |
| 19:00 CEST | Minteh 53'; Tverskov (yellow card) 53'; Skyttä 76' | Report | Gregor (yellow card) 7'; Knudsen 36'; Finnsson 47'; Corlu (yellow card) 54'; Bjelland (yellow card) 58'; Hey (yellow card) 903' | Stadium: Nature Energy Park; Attendance: 7,952; Referee: Jakob Sundberg |

| 28 April 2023 27 | Horsens | 2–2 | Odense | Horsens |
| 19:00 CEST | Jacobsen 35' (pen.); Opondo (yellow card) 44'; Sigurðarson 72' (pen.); Kiilerich (yellow card) 76' | Report | Sabbi 5'; Mustafić 57'; Paulsen (yellow card) 71'; Adelgaard (yellow card) 86'; Breum (yellow card) 90+2' | Stadium: Nordstern Arena; Attendance: 3,324; Referee: Aydin Uslu |

| 7 May 2023 28 | Silkeborg | 0–1 | Odense | Silkeborg |
| 14:00 CEST | Klynge (yellow card) 62' | Report | Minteh (yellow card) 29'; Sabbi 33'; Hansen (yellow card) 63' | Stadium: JYSK Park; Attendance: 3,274; Referee: Jonas Hansen |

| 12 May 2023 29 | Odense | 1–1 | Aalborg | Odense |
| 19:00 CEST | Sabbi 12' | Report | Ludewig (yellow card) 42'; Ferreira 66', (yellow card) 69' | Stadium: Nature Energy Park; Attendance: 11,523; Referee: Chrysovalantis Theouli (Cyprus) |

| 21 May 2023 30 | Lyngby | 0–4 | Odense | Lyngby |
| 14:00 CEST | Finnbogason (red card) 17' | Report | Frøkjær-Jensen 19'; Minteh 38'; Breum (yellow card) 45+2'; Tverskov 53'; Horneman 83' | Stadium: Lyngby Stadium; Attendance: 6,827; Referee: Sandi Putros |

| 26 May 2023 31 | Odense | 2–1 | Horsens | Odense |
| 19:00 CEST | | | | Stadium: Nature Energy Park |

| 3 June 2023 32 | Midtjylland | 4–2 | Odense | Herning |
| 14:00 CEST | | | | Stadium: MCH Arena |

== Squad statistics ==
=== Goalscorers ===
Includes all competitive matches. The list is sorted by shirt number when total goals are equal.

As of match played 3 June 2023

| Rank | Pos. | No. | Player | Superliga | Danish Cup | Total |
|---|---|---|---|---|---|---|
| 1 | FW | 9 | Bashkim Kadrii | 8 | 0 | 8 |
| 1 | FW | 11 | Emmanuel Sabbi | 8 | 0 | 8 |
| 1 | MF | 29 | Mads Frøkjær-Jensen | 8 | 0 | 8 |
| 4 | FW | 30 | Yankuba Minteh | 4 | 0 | 4 |
| 4 | FW | — | Issam Jebali | 4 | 0 | 4 |
| 6 | MF | 6 | Jeppe Tverskov | 2 | 0 | 2 |
| 6 | MF | 7 | Naatan Skyttä | 2 | 0 | 2 |
| 6 | MF | 10 | Franco Tongya | 2 | 0 | 2 |
| 6 | FW | 21 | Charly Nouck Horneman | 2 | 0 | 2 |
| 10 | DF | 4 | Bjørn Paulsen | 1 | 0 | 1 |
| 10 | MF | 5 | Alasana Manneh | 1 | 0 | 1 |
| 10 | MF | 19 | Aron Thrándarson | 1 | 0 | 1 |
| 10 | MF | 24 | Alen Mustafić | 1 | 0 | 1 |
| 10 | MF | — | Armin Gigović | 1 | 0 | 1 |
| 10 | DF | — | Joel King | 0 | 1 | 1 |
| 10 | DF | — | Robin Østrøm | 1 | 0 | 1 |
| Own goals | | | | 1 | 0 | 0 |
| TOTALS | | | | 47 | 1 | 48 |

== Club awards ==
=== Player of the Month award ===
Awarded monthly to the player that was chosen by fans voting on OB's fan app.

| Month | Player | Ref. |
|---|---|---|
| August | N/A | |
| September | (Denmark) Bashkim Kadrii | |
| October | (The Gambia) Yankuba Minteh | |
| November | (The Gambia) Yankuba Minteh (2) | |
| February | (The Gambia) Alasana Manneh | |
| March | | |
| April | | |
| May | | |
