= 2025–26 Odense Boldklub season =

Odense Boldklub
2025–26 season
- Chairman: Niels Thorborg
- Manager: Alexander Zorniger
- Stadium: Nature Energy Park
- Danish Superliga: 8th
- Danish Cup: Quarter-finals
- Top goalscorer: League: Noah Ganaus (9); All: Noah Ganaus (12)

The 2025–26 Odense Boldklub season is the club's 137th season, and their 63rd appearance in the Danish Superliga. It is also Odenses comeback season to the best Danish football tier after relegation to the Danish 1st Division.

At the end of the 2024–25 season, Odense announced the signing of a new head coach, Alexander Zorniger. The German coach is well known in Denmark after his three years as a head coach Brøndby IF from 2016 to 2019. The rumors of Odense signing Zorniger started in February when he was spotted in the Odense away section in a game against Hillerød Fodbold at Right to Dream Park. Sportsdirector Troels Bech knows Zorniger very well from his time in Brøndby. Those two worked together from 2016 til 2018.

== First team ==
Last updated on 22 September 2025

Squad no.	Name	Nationality	Position(s)	Date of birth (age)
Goalkeepers
1	Martin Hansen	(Denmark)	GK	15 June 1990 (age 35)
16	Viljar Myhra	(Norway)	GK	21 July 1996 (age 29)
27	Marcus Eskildsen	(Denmark)	GK	3 December 2007 (age 18)
30	Theo Sander	(Denmark)	GK	8 January 2005 (age 21)
Defenders
3	Adam Sørensen	(Denmark)	LB	11 November 2000 (age 25)
4	Bjørn Paulsen	(Denmark)	CB	2 July 1991 (age 34)
5	Nicolas Bürgy	(Switzerland)	CB	7 August 1995 (age 30)
13	Julius Berthel Askou	(Denmark)	CB	27 May 2006 (age 19)
15	Marcus McCoy	(Denmark)	RB	24 August 2005 (age 20)
20	Leeroy Owusu	(Ghana)	RB	13 August 1996 (age 29)
24	Yaya Bojang	(The Gambia)	CB/CDM	10 September 2004 (age 21)
29	James Gomez	(The Gambia)	CB	14 November 2001 (age 24)
Midfielders
6	Jakob Bonde	(Denmark)	CDM	29 December 1993 (age 32)
8	Rasmus Falk	(Denmark)	CM	15 January 1992 (age 34)
14	Gustav Grubbe	(Denmark)	CDM	27 January 2003 (age 23)
18	Max Ejdum	(Denmark)	CM	15 October 2004 (age 21)
19	Tom Trybull	(Germany)	CM	9 March 1993 (age 32)
21	Vitus Friis	(Denmark)	CDM	31 March 2007 (age 18)
22	Ismahila Ouédraogo	(Burkina Faso)	CDM	5 November 1999 (age 26)
Forwards
7	Fiete Arp	(Germany)	ST	6 January 2000 (age 26)
11	Jona Niemiec	(Germany)	ST	19 September 2001 (age 24)
17	Noah Ganaus	(Germany)	ST	19 January 2001 (age 25)
23	William Martin	(Denmark)	LW/RW/AM	23 April 2007 (age 18)
25	Mads Abrahamsen	(Denmark)	LW	13 January 2007 (age 19)
26	Elias Hansborg-Sørensen	(Denmark)	LW/RW/ST	2 July 2005 (age 20)
28	Magnus Andersen	(Denmark)	LW	3 April 2006 (age 19)
31	Jay-Roy Grot	(Suriname)	ST	13 March 1998 (age 27)

== Transfers ==
=== Transfers in ===
Entry date	Position	No.	Player	From club	Fee	Ref.
1 July 2025	FW	28	(Denmark) Magnus Andersen	Youth academy		
1 July 2025	GK	27	(Denmark) Marcus Eskildsen	Youth academy		
1 July 2025	FW	7	(Germany) Fiete Arp	(Germany) Holstein Kiel	1,850,000 DKK	
1 July 2025	FW	17	(Germany) Noah Ganaus	(Germany) Jahn Regensburg	Free transfer	
2 July 2025	MF	8	(Denmark) Rasmus Falk	(Denmark) Copenhagen	Undisclosed	
26 August 2025	MF	22	(Burkina Faso) Ismahila Ouédraogo	(Greece) Atromitos	7,500,000 DKK	
1 September 2025	FW	11	(Germany) Jona Niemiec	(Germany) Fortuna Düsseldorf	Undisclosed	
18 September 2025	FW	25	(Denmark) Mads Abrahamsen	Youth academy		
22 September 2025	MF	21	(Denmark) Vitus Friis	Youth academy		
Total					9,350,000 DKK	

=== Transfers out ===
Entry date	Position	No.	Player	From club	Fee	Ref.
1 July 2025	DF	2	(Thailand) Nicholas Mickelson	(Germany) Elversberg	End of contract	
16 July 2025	FW	17	(Denmark) Luca Kjerrumgaard	(Italy) Udinese	37,500,000 DKK	
17 July 2025	FW	10	(Haiti) Louicius Don Deedson	(United States) FC Dallas	30,000,000 DKK	
Total					67,500,000 DKK	

=== Loans in ===
Start date	End date	Position	No.	Player	From club	Ref
17 July 2025	30 June 2026	GK	30	(Denmark) Theo Sander	(Denmark) Copenhagen	

=== Loans out ===
Start date	End date	Position	No.	Player	From club	Ref
20 August 2025	30 June 2026	FW	11	(Denmark) Markus Jensen	(Netherlands) Utrecht	
1 September 2025	30 June 2026	MF	21	(Denmark) Nikolaj Juul-Sandberg	(Denmark) Middelfart	

=== New contracts ===
Date	Pos	No.	Player	Ref.
20 August 2025	FW	11	(Denmark) Markus Jensen	
1 September 2025	MF	21	(Denmark) Nikolaj Juul-Sandberg	

== Friendlies ==
=== Pre-season ===
Win Draw Loss Fixtures

20 June 2025	Odense	1–2	Esbjerg	Odense
17:00 CEST	Jensen 53'	Report	Lucena 20', 45'	Stadium: Ådalen; Attendance: 1,153; Referee: Allan Staal

26 June 2025	Odense	0–2	Sønderjyske	Odense
14:00 CEST		Report	Agger 44'; Bergholt 82'	Stadium: Ådalen

1 July 2025	Odense	3–0	B.93	Nyborg
16:00 CEST	Arp 1'; Ganaus 45+1'; Askou 87'	Report		Stadium: Nyborg Stadium

6 July 2025	Aarhus	0–0	Odense	Aarhus
16:00 CEST		Report		Stadium: Fredensvang

12 July 2025	Randers	0–2	Odense	Randers
14:00 CEST		Report	Arp 8'; Owusu 90'	Stadium: Randers FC's bane 9

== Competitions ==
=== Superliga ===
==== League table ====
Pos	Team	Pld	W	D	L	GF	GA	GD	Pts	Qualification
6	Nordsjælland	20	10	0	10	33	34	−1	30	Qualification for the Championship round
7	Copenhagen	20	8	4	8	32	30	+2	28	Qualification for the Relegation round
8	OB	20	7	5	8	34	43	−9	26	Qualification for the Relegation round
9	Randers (Q)	20	6	5	9	19	24	−5	23	Qualification for the Relegation round
10	Silkeborg (Q)	20	5	4	11	23	39	−16	19	Qualification for the Relegation round

Updated to match(es) played on 16 February 2026. Source: Danish Football Association (in Danish), Soccerway
Rules for classification: 1) Points; 2) Goal difference; 3) Goals scored; 4) Away goals scored; 5) Play-off (played on neutral ground if determining teams for different rounds); 6) Draw.
(Q) Qualified for the phase indicated

==== Results summary ====
Overall								Home						Away					
Pld	W	D	L	GF	GA	GD	Pts	W	D	L	GF	GA	GD	W	D	L	GF	GA	GD
18	7	5	6	32	37	−5	26	4	2	3	17	18	−1	3	3	3	15	19	−4

Last updated: 7 December 2025.
Source: Worldfootball.net

==== Results by round ====
Matchday	1	2	3	4	5	6	7	8	9	10	11	12	13	14	15	16	17	18	19	20	21	22
Ground	A	H	A	H	H	A	H	A	H	A	H	A	H	A	H	A	H	A	A	H	H	A
Result	D	W	L	W	L	D	L	L	W	L	D	W	L	W	D	D	W	W				
Position	4	3	6	4	7	6	9	11	9	10	9	8	10	7	7	8	7	6				
Points	1	4	4	7	7	8	8	8	11	11	12	15	15	18	19	20	23	26				

Updated to match(es) played on 7 December 2025. Source: Worldfootball.net
A = Away; H = Home; W = Win; D = Draw; L = Loss

==== Matches ====
Win Draw Loss Fixtures

20 July 2025 1	Midtjylland	3–3	Odense	Herning
18:00 CEST	Franculino 45+2', 85'; Buksa 45+5'; Mbabu (yellow card) 48'; Lee (yellow card) 80'	Report	Ganaus 3'; Grot 30'; Owusu (yellow card) 36'; Arp 67' (pen.), (yellow card) 82'; Grubbe (yellow card) 90+10'	Stadium: MCH Arena; Attendance: 9,813; Referee: Morten Krogh

27 July 2025 2	Odense	3–1	Viborg	Odense
14:00 CEST	Ganaus 42'; Bürgy 57', 63'; Arp (yellow card) 67'; Bojang (yellow card) 90+2'	Report	Grønning (yellow card) 76'; Horneman 85'	Stadium: Nature Energy Park; Attendance: 12,394; Referee: Michael Tykgaard

1 August 2025 3	Vejle	4–0	Odense	Vejle
20:00 CEST	Hjulsager 15', (yellow card) 75'; Duelund 23', 57'; Gammelgaard 62'	Report	Sørensen (yellow card) 90'	Stadium: Vejle Stadium; Attendance: 10,187; Referee: Frederik Svendsen

11 August 2025 4	Odense	3–2	Randers	Odense
19:00 CEST	Ganaus 5'; Arp 43' (pen.); Grot 45+1'; Gomez (yellow card) 71'	Report	Campbell 7'; Danho 24'; Campbell (yellow card) 58'; Greve (yellow card) 64'; Dyhr (yellow card) 90+3'; Høegh (yellow card) 90+5'	Stadium: Nature Energy Park; Attendance: 9,270; Referee: Aydin Uslu

18 August 2025 5	Odense	1–5	Aarhus	Odense
19:00 CEST		Report		Stadium: Nature Energy Park; Attendance: 13,073; Referee: Morten Krogh

23 August 2025 6	Copenhagen	1–1	Odense	Copenhagen
18:00 CEST		Report		Stadium: Parken Stadium; Attendance: 27,397; Referee: Jens Maae

31 August 2025 7	Odense	1–2	Nordsjælland	Odense
16:00 CEST		Report		Stadium: Nature Energy Park; Attendance: 10,915; Referee: Sandi Putros

14 September 2025 8	Silkeborg	2–1	Odense	Silkeborg
18:00 CEST		Report		Stadium: JYSK Park; Attendance: 4,024; Referee: Jakob Kehlet

19 September 2025 9	Odense	3–2	Fredericia	Odense
19:00 CEST		Report		Stadium: Nature Energy Park; Attendance: 9,119; Referee: Frederik Svendsen

28 September 2025 10	Brøndby	5–1	Odense	Brøndbyøster
20:00 CEST				Stadium: Brøndby Stadium

3 October 2025 11	Odense	1–1	Sønderjyske	Odense
19:00 CEST	Paulsen 38'; Askou (yellow card) 45+1'	Report	Hoppe 69'; Lyng (yellow card) 90'	Stadium: Nature Energy Park; Attendance: 9,159; Referee: Svend Funder

19 October 2025 12	Viborg	1–2	Odense	Viborg
14:00 CEST	Vester 5'	Report	Ganaus 57', (yellow card) 79'; Niemiec 60'	Stadium: Viborg Stadium; Attendance: 5,560; Referee: Sandi Putros

27 October 2025 13	Odense	1–4	Brøndby	Odense
19:00 CEST				Stadium: Nature Energy Park

2 November 2025 14	Nordsjælland	2–4	Odense	Farum
18:00 CEST				Stadium: Right to Dream Park

7 November 2025 15	Odense	1–1	Silkeborg	Odense
19:00 CEST				Stadium: Nature Energy Park; Referee: Lasse Graagaard

24 November 2025 16	Randers	0–0	Odense	Randers
19:00 CEST				Stadium: Cepheus Park Randers; Referee: Sandi Putros

30 November 2025 17	Odense	3–0	Vejle	Odense
18:00 CEST		Report		Stadium: Nature Energy Park; Attendance: 6,722; Referee: Jakob Kehlet

5 December 2025 18	Fredericia	1–3	Odense	Fredericia
19:00 CEST		Report		Stadium: Monjasa Park; Attendance: 3,348; Referee: Jens Maae

8 February 2026 19	Aarhus	v	Odense	Fredericia
				Stadium: Monjasa Park

15 February 2026 20	Odense	v	Midtjylland	Odense
				Stadium: Nature Energy Park

22 February 2026 21	Odense	v	Copenhagen	Odense
				Stadium: Nature Energy Park

1 March 2026 22	Sønderjyske	v	Odense	Haderslev
				Stadium: Sydbank Park

=== Danish Cup ===
27 August 2025 Second round	Kalundborg	0–11	Odense	Odense
17:00 CEST		Report		Stadium: Odense Stadium; Attendance: 2,715; Referee: Frederik Svendsen

23 September 2025 Third round	Sundby	0–3	Odense	Sundby
19:00 CEST	Krogh Hansen (yellow card) 65'; Lundqvist (yellow card) 84'		Niemiec 28'; Ganaus 75'; Hansborg-Sørensen 85'	Stadium: Sundby Idrætspark; Attendance: 1,715

28–30 October 2025 Fourth round	Brønshøj	0–3	Odense	Brønshøj
				Stadium: Tingbjerg Idrætspark

11 December 2025 Quarter-final 1st leg	Odense	1–0	Aarhus	Odense
				Stadium: Odense Stadium

14 December 2025 Quarter-final 2nd leg	AGF	3–1 (3–2 agg.)	OB	Aarhus Stadium
15:00

== Squad statistics ==
=== Goalscorers ===
Includes all competitive matches. The list is sorted by shirt number when total goals are equal.

As of match played 14 December 2025

Rank	Pos.	No.	Player	Superliga	Danish Cup	Total
1	FW	17	Noah Ganaus	9	3	12
2	FW	7	Fiete Arp	8	1	9
3	FW	31	Jay-Roy Grot	6	0	6
4	FW	11	Jona Niemiec	2	2	4
4	FW	26	Elias Hansborg-Sørensen	0	4	4
6	DF	4	Bjørn Paulsen	1	2	3
7	DF	5	Nicolas Bürgy	2	0	2
7	MF	14	Gustav Grubbe	0	2	2
7	MF	18	Max Ejdum	1	1	2
7	MF	23	William Martin	0	2	2
11	DF	3	Adam Sørensen	1	0	1
11	DF	20	Leeroy Owusu	1	0	1
11	MF	22	Ismahila Ouédraogo	0	1	1
11	FW	25	Mads Abrahamsen	0	1	1
11	DF	29	James Gomez	1	0	1
Own goals				1	0	1
TOTALS				32	19	51
