= Gustav Grubbe =

Danish footballer (born 2003)

Personal information
- Full name: Gustav Grubbe Madsen
- Date of birth: 27 January 2003 (age 23)
- Place of birth: Odense, Denmark
- Height: 1.82 m (6 ft 0 in)
- Position: Right-back

Team information
- Current team: OB
- Number: 14

Youth career
- 2007–2019: OB
- 2019–2022: RB Leipzig

Senior career*
Years	Team	Apps	(Gls)
2019	OB	1	(0)
2019–2022	RB Leipzig	0	(0)
2022–	OB	78	(0)

International career
2018–2019	Denmark U16	10	(0)
2019–2020	Denmark U17	7	(0)
2020	Denmark U18	1	(0)
2021–2022	Denmark U19	9	(0)
2022	Denmark U20	2	(0)
2023	Denmark U21	1	(0)
- * Club domestic league appearances and goals as of 15:38, 13 April 2026 (UTC)

Gustav Grubbe Madsen (born 27 January 2003) is a Danish professional footballer who plays as a right-back for Danish Superliga club OB.

== Club career ==
=== OB ===
Born in Odense, Grubbe entered the youth academy of his hometown club Odense Boldklub (OB) at age four and advanced through every age group. In January 2019, shortly after his 16th birthday, head coach Jakob Michelsen included him in the first-team training camp in Belek, where he played a friendly against Lechia Gdańsk and was formally promoted to the senior squad.

Grubbe made his competitive debut on 5 May 2019, replacing Troels Kløve late in a 2–1 Superliga defeat to Midtjylland. Aged 16 years and 98 days, he became the second-youngest player in OB's history, the youngest to appear in the league that season, and the fourth-youngest footballer ever to feature in the Danish top flight.

=== RB Leipzig ===
On 21 June 2019, Grubbe joined RB Leipzig for an undisclosed fee, linking up with the under-17s before captaining the under-19s in the Under 19 Bundesliga.

Although he trained periodically with the first team, he left Germany in 2022 without a senior appearance.

=== Return to OB ===
On 31 May 2022, OB confirmed Grubbe's return on a four-year contract. Competing with Thailand international Nicholas Mickelson for the right-back berth, he broke into the starting line-up after the winter break and closed the 2022–23 season with 19 league appearances and two assists.

In 2023–24, Grubbe featured only intermittently—partly because of a pre-spring muscular injury—and made ten league outings as OB endured a calamitous season that ended in relegation, the club's first since 1998, following a 2–1 defeat away to Viborg on 25 May 2024.

OB responded with an immediate promotion charge in the 2024–25 season. Grubbe reclaimed the right-back berth—stepping in for the injured Leeroy Owusu on several occasions—and recorded 32 league appearances, one goal and four assists as the club secured first place with four rounds to spare.

== Career statistics ==
As of match played 20 March 2026

Appearances and goals by club, season and competition
Club	Season	League			National cup		Europe		Other		Total	
Club	Season	Division	Apps	Goals	Apps	Goals	Apps	Goals	Apps	Goals	Apps	Goals
OB	2018–19	Danish Superliga	1	0	0	0	—		—		1	0
RB Leipzig	2019–20	Bundesliga	0	0	0	0	0	0	0	0	0	0
RB Leipzig	2020–21	Bundesliga	0	0	0	0	0	0	0	0	0	0
RB Leipzig	2021–22	Bundesliga	0	0	0	0	0	0	0	0	0	0
RB Leipzig	Total		0	0	0	0	0	0	0	0	0	0
OB	2022–23	Danish Superliga	27	0	1	0	—		—		28	0
OB	2023–24	Danish Superliga	8	0	2	0	—		—		10	0
OB	2024–25	Danish 1st Division	29	0	1	0	—		—		30	0
OB	2025–26	Danish Superliga	14	0	4	2	—		—		18	2
OB	Total		78	0	8	2	0	0	0	0	86	2
Career total			79	0	8	2	0	0	0	0	87	2

== Honours ==
OB

- Danish 1st Division: 2024–25
