= Max Ejdum =

Danish footballer (born 2004)

Personal information
- Full name: Max Isaac Ejdum
- Date of birth: 15 October 2004 (age 22)
- Place of birth: Svendborg, Denmark
- Height: 1.84 m (6 ft 0 in)
- Position: Midfielder

Team information
- Current team: Brøndby
- Number: 18

Youth career
- 2013–2015: Svendborg fB
- 2015–2023: OB

Senior career*
Years	Team	Apps	(Gls)
2023–2026	OB	67	(8)
2026–	Brøndby	10	(2)

International career^{‡}
2021–2022	Denmark U18	4	(0)
2023	Denmark U19	1	(0)
2023–2024	Denmark U20	4	(1)
2025–	Denmark U21	5	(0)
- * Club domestic league appearances and goals as of 08:03, 12 October 2026 (UTC) ‡ National team caps and goals as of 28 September 2026

Max Isaac Ejdum (born 15 October 2004) is a Danish professional footballer who plays as a midfielder for Danish Superliga club Brøndby.

== Club career ==
=== OB ===
Ejdum began his career at local side Svendborg fB, where he played from under-9 to under-11 level, before joining OB's academy as an under-12 player. He progressed through the youth ranks and, at the age of 17, received his first senior call-up on 29 July 2022 for a Superliga match against Midtjylland, making his professional debut in the same fixture as a late substitute for Bashkim Kadrii in a 5–1 home defeat.

On 8 February 2023 OB announced that Ejdum had signed a new professional contract running until June 2026 and that he would be promoted to the first-team squad from the 2023–24 season. He made his first senior start on 18 September 2023 in a 3–0 home defeat to Silkeborg, but was substituted in the first half after suffering an injury.

On 28 April 2024, Ejdum scored his first professional goal in a 2–1 home loss to Hvidovre. He finished the 2023–24 season with one goal in ten league appearances, as OB were relegated from the Superliga for the first time in 26 years.

Ejdum became a regular starter during the 2024–25 season, scoring six goals and providing four assists in 29 league matches as OB won the second-tier title and secured an immediate return to the Superliga. In November 2024, he extended his contract with the club until 2028.

On 31 August 2025, Ejdum sustained a calf muscle injury in a Superliga match against Nordsjælland, sidelining him for an extended period. In November 2025 he received a one-match suspension from the Danish Football Association's disciplinary body for post-match comments criticising referee Lasse Graagaard following a 1–1 league draw with Silkeborg; he later stated that he regretted the remarks.

=== Brøndby ===
On 6 July 2026, Ejdum signed a five-year contract with Danish Superliga club Brøndby for a reported €3.5 million fee.

== International career ==
At youth level, Ejdum has represented Denmark from under-18 to under-21 level. He made his debut for the under-18 team in 2021 and went on to earn four caps for the side before progressing to the under-19s and under-20s. On 8 September 2023, he scored his first goal at under-20 level in a 2–2 friendly draw against France in Gladsaxe.

== Style of play ==
Ejdum plays as a central midfielder. He has been described as a versatile box-to-box player who contributes across several areas of the game without standing out in any one, and whose principal strength is his work in duels. A strong tackler, he wins a high proportion of his duels both on the ground and in the air.

In an analysis for Tipsbladet, Opta found that Ejdum contested an average of nine duels per match in the 2025–26 season, winning 54.2% of them and 56.8% of his aerial duels, and that he completed 67.6% of his attempted tackles. He is not a prominent goalscorer or chance creator. He scored once and provided five assists for OB that season, taking fewer shots and creating fewer chances than most comparable midfielders. On signing him, Brøndby's football director, Julius Ohnesorge, described him as a dynamic and hard-working midfielder with high intensity and a good understanding of the game both on and off the ball.

== Personal life ==
Ejdum is the son of former footballer Kristian Ejdum, who made around 120 division appearances for Svendborg fB.

== Career statistics ==
As of match played 11 October 2026

Appearances and goals by club, season and competition
Club	Season	League			National cup		Other		Total	
Club	Season	Division	Apps	Goals	Apps	Goals	Apps	Goals	Apps	Goals
OB	2022–23	Danish Superliga	2	0	0	0	—		2	0
OB	2023–24	Danish Superliga	10	1	2	0	—		12	1
OB	2024–25	Danish 1st Division	29	6	1	0	—		30	6
OB	2025–26	Danish Superliga	26	1	3	1	—		29	2
OB	Total		67	8	6	1	0	0	73	9
Brøndby	2026–27	Danish Superliga	10	2	1	0	—		11	2
Career total			77	10	7	1	0	0	84	11

== Honours ==
OB

- Danish 1st Division: 2024–25
