= Bjørn Paulsen =

Danish footballer (born 1991)

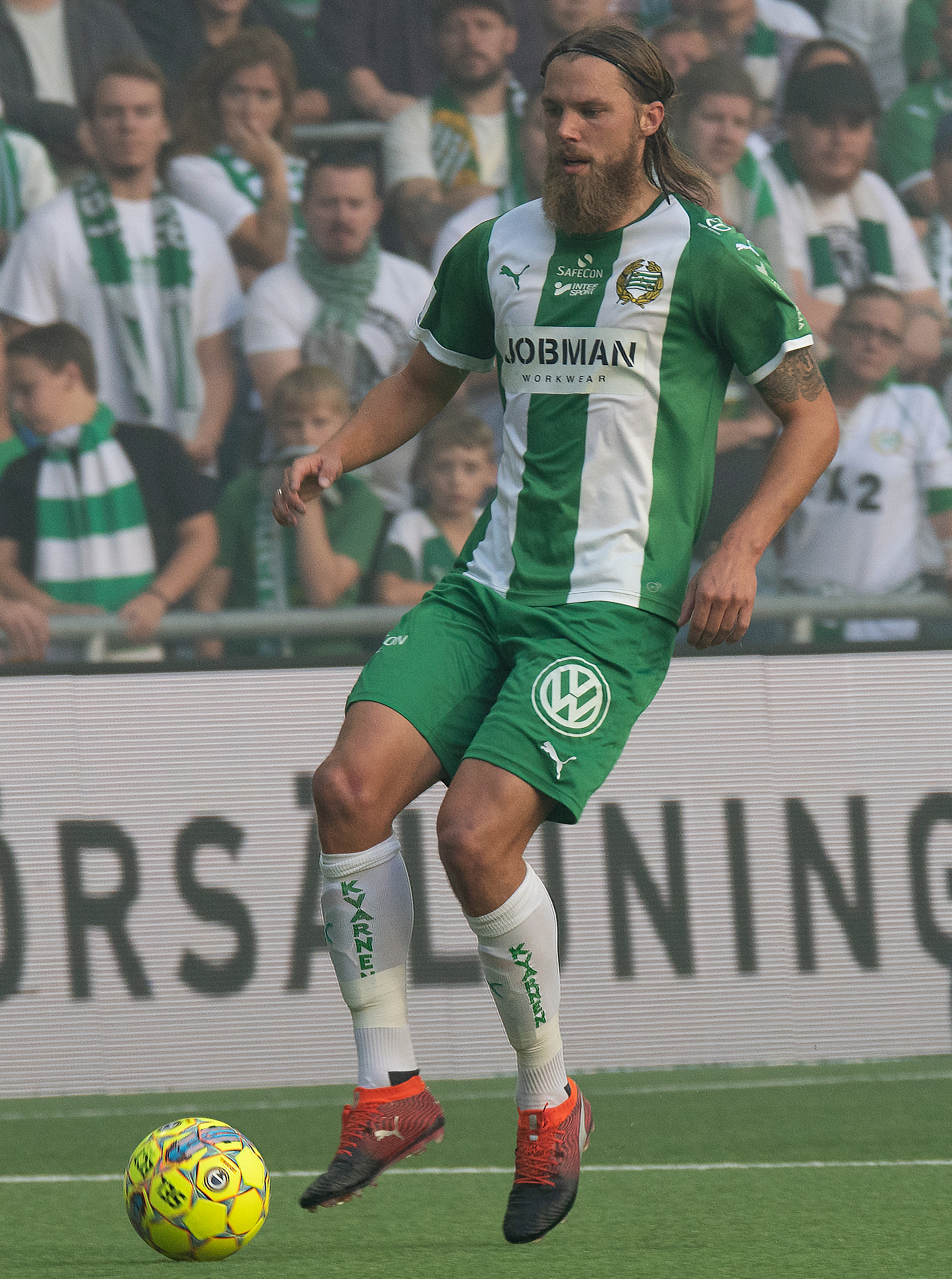
- Paulsen playing for Hammarby IF in 2018

Personal information
- Full name: Bjørn Iversen Paulsen
- Date of birth: 2 July 1991 (age 35)
- Place of birth: Augustenborg, Denmark
- Height: 1.90 m (6 ft 3 in)
- Position: Centre back

Youth career
- Midtals IF
- Haderslev FK
- SUB Sønderborg
- SønderjyskE

Senior career*
Years	Team	Apps	(Gls)
2009–2015	SønderjyskE	143	(12)
2015–2017	Esbjerg fB	45	(5)
2017–2019	Hammarby IF	58	(13)
2019–2021	FC Ingolstadt	74	(5)
2021–2022	Hammarby IF	33	(3)
2022–2026	OB	100	(6)
Total		453	(44)

International career
2010	Denmark U20	2	(2)
- * Club domestic league appearances and goals

Bjørn Iversen Paulsen (born 2 July 1991) is a Danish former professional footballer. Primarily a centre back, he was known for his versatility in playing several positions on the pitch during his career. From 2009 until his retirement in 2026, he made 507 appearances for five different clubs, scoring 54 goals. In addition to his club career, he made two appearances for the Danish under-20 national team.

== Early life ==
Paulsen was born in Augustenborg and started his youth career in local clubs Midtals, Haderslev and Sønderborg. On 1 January 2007, he joined the youth ranks of SønderjyskE.

== Club career ==
=== SønderjyskE ===
Paulsen made his debut for SønderjyskE in the Superliga during the 2009–10 season, coming on as a late sub in a 1–3 away loss against Nordsjælland on 25 April 2010 at age 19.

Paulsen's first start for SønderjyskE came on 14 August 2010 in a 1–3 loss to Odense at home. A week later, in a 2–0 win against Horsens, Paulsen provided his first assist in the Danish top tier. In total, he made 21 league appearances throughout the 2010–11 season.

The following season, Paulsen played 19 games under new manager Lars Søndergaard. He provided three assists during the season and scored his first Superliga goal in a fixture against Aalborg on 23 May 2012, in the 75th minute as SønderjyskE won 5–0.

In the 2012–13, Paulsen established himself as a mainstay at SønderjyskE, appearing in 31 league games and scoring three goals. On 24 October 2012, starting at striker in a 4–0 win over lower-league side FC Hjørring (now Vendsyssel FF) in the Danish Cup, he scored his first career hat-trick.

The next two seasons saw Paulsen developed his play dramatically and progressed to become a highly regarded player in the Superliga. He was also made vice-captain at SønderjyskE. The club finished 10th in the table, just above the relegation zone, in both 2013–14 and 2014–15. Paulsen played 32 games and scored four goals in both of the separate campaigns.

Ahead of the 2015–16 season, Jakob Michelsen was appointed as the new manager of SønderjyskE. Paulsen played an integral part during his first months at the club, appearing in the seven first fixtures of the campaign.

=== Esbjerg ===
On 31 August 2015, on the closing day of the international transfer window, Paulsen transferred to Esbjerg fB in the same league. Reports suggested a fee of 5 million Danish kroner (approximately £0,6 million), as Paulsen signed a four-year deal.

He made his debut on 14 September 2015, home at Blue Water Arena, in a 4–2 win against Odense BK. Paulsen started out playing as a central defender, but in October the same year, Esbjerg appointed Jonas Dal as their new manager. He used Paulsen at different outfields position, mainly in either one of the offensive winger positions.

Paulsen scored his first goal for Esbjerg against domestic giants F.C. Copenhagen on 28 February 2016, an equalizer as Esbjerg eventually lost 2–1 on away turf. In total, Paulsen made 25 league appearances in the campaign, scoring three goals, whilst being an important member of the Esbjerg squad.

During the upcoming season, in 2016–17, Paulsen continued to play at either flank during the reign of new manager Colin Todd. However, the results during the first half went against Esbjerg, that soon found themselves at the foot of the table. Paulsen was named as one of five players that could be deemed surplus to requirements at the club during the January transfer window, due to his reportedly high salary.

=== Hammarby IF ===
On 16 January 2017, Paulsen was sold to the Swedish club Hammarby IF in Allsvenskan. He signed a three-year deal and rejoined Jakob Michelsen, his former manager from SønderjyskE. The fee was reported as being 1.6 million Danish kroner (approximately £200,000). On 9 April, he scored his first competitive goal for Hammarby, a late equalizer as his side drew 1–1 against Kalmar FF on the second matchday of the league campaign. On 29 April, Paulsen scored a brace as Hammarby defeated the newly promoted side AFC Eskilstuna in a 4–0 win. He scored another two goals as Hammarby won against IF Elfsborg on 24 July, with Paulsen deciding the result to 2–1. Throughout the season, Paulsen played 29 league games and scored eight goals in total, being voted Hammarby Player of the Year for 2017 by the supporters of the club.

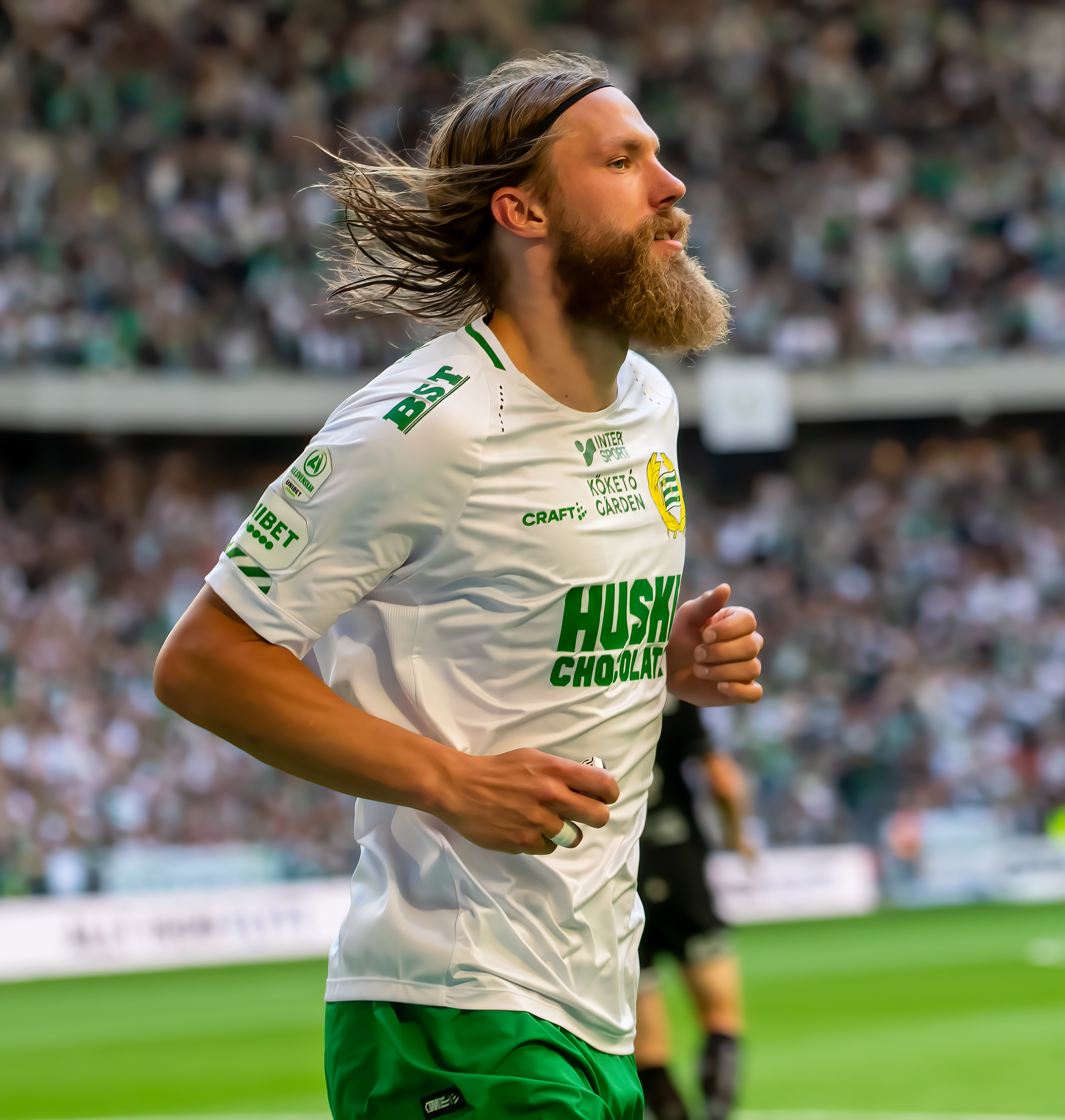
Hammarby - Göteborg 2022-07-11

In August 2018, following a number of impressive performances in the central defender position, Paulsen attracted interest from AEK Athens. Hammarby reportedly turned down an offer of around 8.4 million Swedish kronor (approximately £700,000) from the Super League Greece club. He eventually played 29 league games during the 2018 Allsvenskan season, scoring five goals, as Hammarby finished fourth in the league. He was nominated for the prize Allsvenskan defender of the year, that eventually was awarded to Per Karlsson, and chosen as one of the eleven best players of the season by Cmore Sports, Fotbollskanalen and Playmaker.

=== FC Ingolstadt ===
On 7 January 2019, Paulsen completed a transfer to FC Ingolstadt in the 2. Bundesliga for an undisclosed fee. He signed a two-and-a-half-year contract with the German club. In the 2018–19 2. Bundesliga, Paulsen played 16 games and scored twice, as Ingolstadt finished 16th in the table and lost the relegation playoff against SV Wehen Wiesbaden on away goals.

In the 2019–20 3. Liga season, Paulsen made 30 league appearances for Ingolstadt, as the club qualified for the promotion playoffs but lost to FC Nürnberg on away goals. In 2020–21, Paulsen played 28 games as Ingolstadt reached the playoff once again and succeeded to win a promotion to the 2. Bundesliga, through a 4–3 win on aggregate against VfL Osnabrück. At the end of the season, Paulsen was named in the official Team of the Season of 3. Liga as one of three centre-backs. On 31 May 2021, Paulsen left Ingolstadt at the expiration of his contract.

=== Return to Hammarby ===
On 4 June 2021, Paulsen returned to his former club Hammarby IF in Allsvenskan, signing a three-and-a-half-year contract. The transfer came to effect on 15 July the same year, at the start of the summer transfer window. He featured in all six games as the side reached the play-off round of the 2021–22 UEFA Europa Conference League, after eliminating Maribor (4–1 on aggregate) and FK Čukarički (6–4 on aggregate, in which Paulsen scored), where the club was knocked out by Basel (4–4 on aggregate) after a penalty shoot-out.

Paulsen featured in the final of the 2021–22 Svenska Cupen, in which Hammarby lost by 4–5 on penalties to Malmö FF after the game ended in a 0–0 draw.

=== OB ===
On 11 July 2022, Paulsen returned to the Danish Superliga for an undisclosed fee, signing a three-year contract with OB. Soon after OB announced that his contract would not be renewed, on 13 May 2026, he announced his intention to retire at the end of the 2025–26 Danish Superliga season.

== Style of play ==
Paulsen prefers to play as a central defender. However, he has been known as a utility player throughout his whole career in Denmark, making appearances in almost every outfield position during his time with both SønderjyskE and Esbjerg. At Hammarby, Paulsen started out playing as a central attacking midfielder, before pairing up with compatriot Mads Fenger in the central defence during the second half of the 2017 season. He departed the club after 105 appearances and one Danish 1st Division title.

== International career ==
Paulsen won two caps for the Danish U-20 national team during the SuperCupNI in 2010. He scored a brace in a fixture against Japan during the same tournament.

== Career statistics ==
As of final match played 17 May 2026

Appearances and goals by club, season and competition
Club	Season	League			Cup		Continental		Other		Total	
Club	Season	Division	Apps	Goals	Apps	Goals	Apps	Goals	Apps	Goals	Apps	Goals
SønderjyskE	2009–10	Danish Superliga	1	0	1	0	—		—		2	0
SønderjyskE	2010–11	Danish Superliga	21	0	0	0	—		—		21	0
SønderjyskE	2011–12	Danish Superliga	19	1	3	2	—		—		22	3
SønderjyskE	2012–13	Danish Superliga	31	3	2	3	—		—		33	6
SønderjyskE	2013–14	Danish Superliga	32	4	2	0	—		—		34	4
SønderjyskE	2014–15	Danish Superliga	32	4	5	0	—		—		37	4
SønderjyskE	2015–16	Danish Superliga	7	0	0	0	—		—		7	0
SønderjyskE	Total		143	12	13	5	0	0	0	0	156	17
Esbjerg	2015–16	Danish Superliga	25	3	2	0	—		—		27	3
Esbjerg	2016–17	Danish Superliga	20	2	2	0	—		—		22	2
Esbjerg	Total		45	5	4	0	0	0	0	0	49	5
Hammarby IF	2017	Allsvenskan	29	8	4	0	—		—		33	8
Hammarby IF	2018	Allsvenskan	29	5	4	0	—		—		33	5
Hammarby IF	Total		58	13	8	0	0	0	0	0	66	13
Ingolstadt	2018–19	2. Bundesliga	16	2	0	0	—		2 (Note: Appearances in 2. Bundesliga relegation playoff.)	1	18	3
Ingolstadt	2019–20	3. Liga	30	0	2	0	—		2 (Note: Appearances in 3. Liga promotion playoff.)	0	34	0
Ingolstadt	2020–21	3. Liga	28	3	1	0	—		2	0	31	3
Ingolstadt	Total		74	5	3	0	0	0	6	1	83	6
Hammarby IF	2021	Allsvenskan	20	2	1	0	6 (Note: Appearances in UEFA Europa Conference League)	1	—		27	3
Hammarby IF	2022	Allsvenskan	13	1	6	1	—		—		19	2
Hammarby IF	Total		33	3	7	1	6	1	0	0	46	5
OB	2022–23	Danish Superliga	26	1	1	0	—		—		27	1
OB	2023–24	Danish Superliga	24	0	1	0	—		—		25	0
OB	2024–25	Danish 1st Division	30	4	0	0	—		—		30	4
OB	2025–26	Danish Superliga	20	1	3	2	—		—		23	3
OB	Total		100	6	5	2	0	0	0	0	105	8
Career total			453	44	40	8	6	1	6	1	507	54

== Honours ==
OB

- Danish 1st Division: 2024–25

Individual

- Hammarby IF Player of the Year: 2017
