= Yankuba Minteh =

Gambian footballer (born 2004)

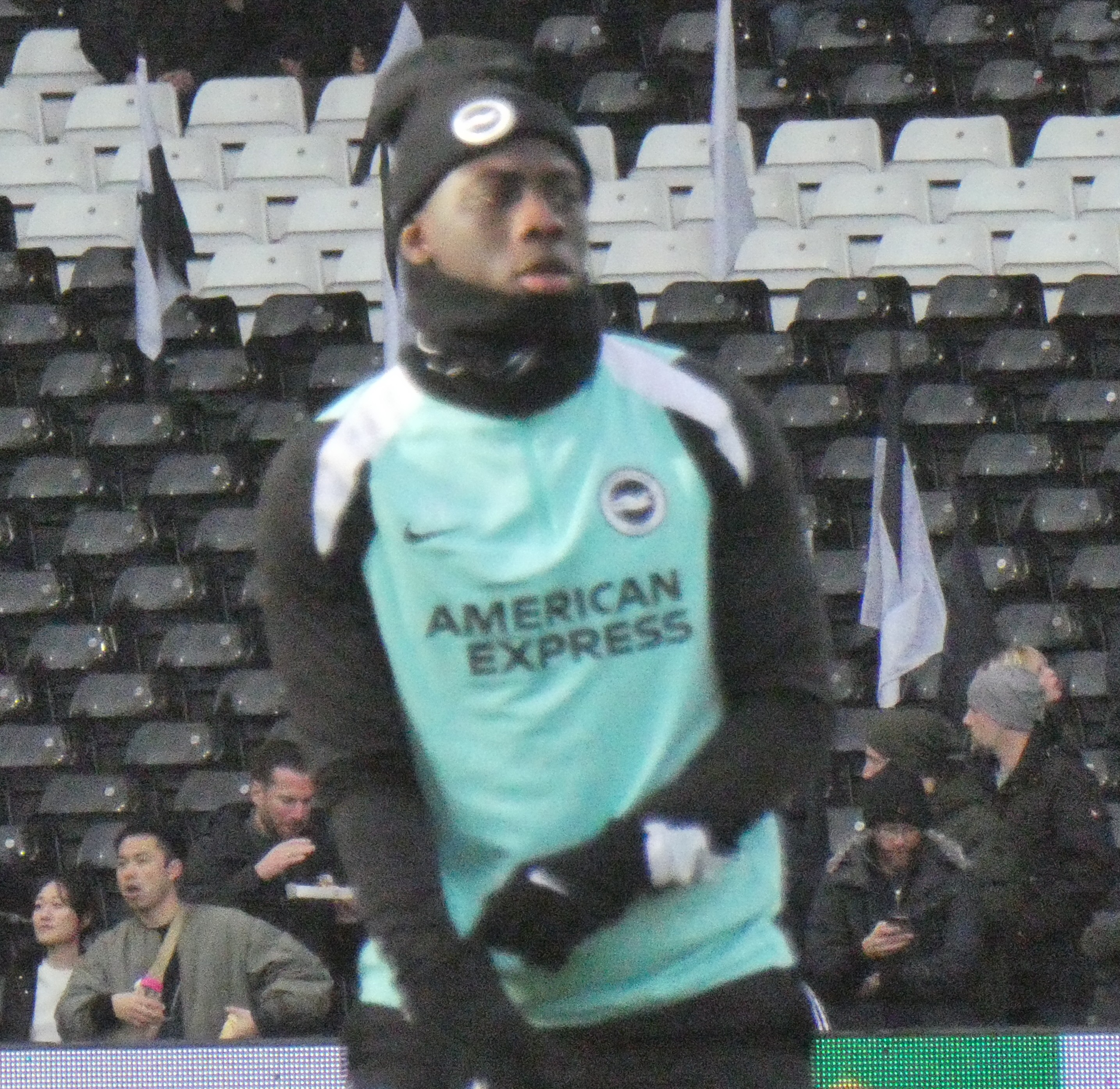
- Minteh with Brighton & Hove Albion in 2026

Personal information
- Date of birth: 22 July 2004 (age 22)
- Place of birth: Serekunda, Gambia
- Height: 1.80 m (5 ft 11 in)
- Position: Right winger

Team information
- Current team: Brighton & Hove Albion
- Number: 11

Youth career
- Bakoteh United

Senior career*
Years	Team	Apps	(Gls)
2021–2022	Steve Biko		
2022–2023	OB	17	(4)
2023–2024	Newcastle United	0	(0)
2023–2024	→ Feyenoord (loan)	27	(10)
2024–	Brighton & Hove Albion	67	(9)

International career^{‡}
- Gambia U17
2022–	Gambia	22	(8)
- * Club domestic league appearances and goals as of 8 November 2026 ‡ National team caps and goals as of 17 November 2026

Yankuba Minteh (born 22 July 2004) is a Gambian professional footballer who plays as a right winger for Premier League club Brighton & Hove Albion and the Gambia national team.

== Club career ==
=== The Gambia ===
Minteh started his senior career at Steve Biko during the 2021–22 GFA League First Division season, after playing youth football for local club Bakoteh United. He finished third with Steve Biko in his only season at the club.

=== OB ===
Following time playing domestically in The Gambia, Minteh's agent Bakary Bojang asked Danish club OB to have a look at Minteh and a fellow Gambian, Dawda Darboe. They were both called in for a trial in the summer of 2021, playing for OB in their preparation ahead of the 2021–22 season. Minteh didn't leave a good impression, but he got a second chance at a try-out, and that was a way better impression. In the summer of 2022, he signed a two-year contract with OB. First for the U19-team, and later the same year a first-team contract. He made his Danish Superliga debut on 10 September 2022 in a 2–1 win against Copenhagen and scored the winning goal just three minutes after coming on as a substitute for Franco Tongya.

=== Newcastle United ===
On 12 June 2023, Premier League club Newcastle United announced that they had reached a deal to sign Minteh on a permanent deal from 1 July. Media reports claimed that Newcastle would pay OB a fee in the region of €7 million. Simultaneously, Newcastle also announced that upon his arrival, Minteh would be immediately loaned out to Eredivisie champions Feyenoord for the 2023–24 season.

==== Feyenoord (loan) ====
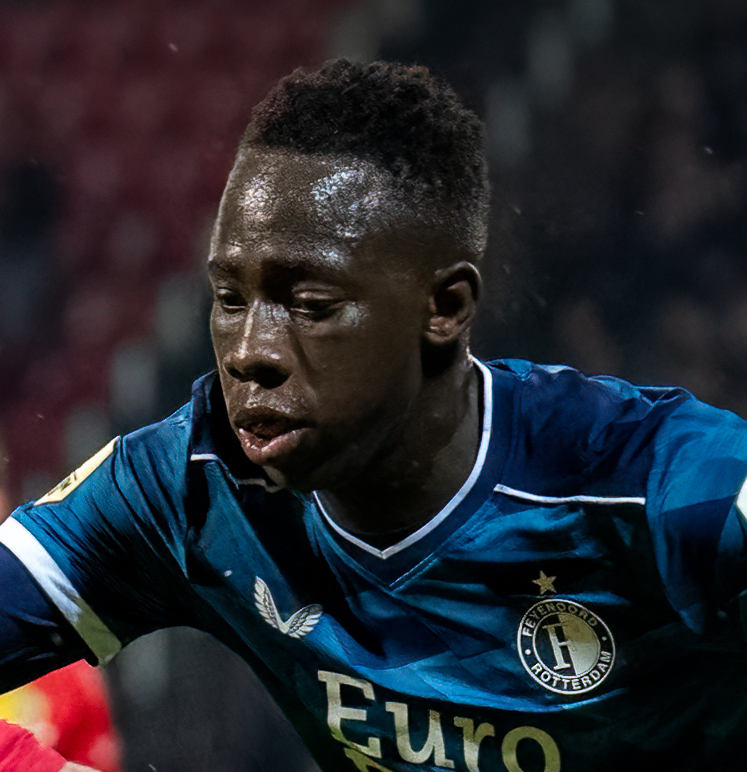
Minteh with Feyenoord in 2024.

Minteh made his debut for the club on 4 August in the 2023 Johan Cruyff Shield. He scored his first goal for the club on 3 September, scoring the fifth goal in a 5–1 away win against FC Utrecht. In late October 2023, he picked up a muscle injury, missing several weeks as a result. On 13 December, he scored his first UEFA Champions League goal in a 2–1 away defeat against Celtic in the final group stage match of the 2023–24 season, in which he became the second Gambian to achieve this feat following Ebrima Colley.

On 7 April 2024, he scored a brace and provided an assist for his club in a 6–0 victory over Ajax in De Klassieker, to be their opponent's worst defeat in the Eredivisie history.

=== Brighton and Hove Albion ===
On 1 July 2024, Minteh joined Premier League side Brighton & Hove Albion for a reported fee of £30 million, signing a five-year contract with the club. Minteh made his debut for the club on 17 August 2024 in a fixture in which he provided an assist for Kaoru Mitoma in a 3–0 win over Everton. Minteh scored his first Premier League goal on 6 October 2024 in a 3–2 win over Tottenham. He continued to impress for Brighton as their season went on, proceeding to score a brace in a 3–0 victory over Chelsea.

== International career ==
Whilst still playing domestic football in The Gambia, Minteh represented the country’s under-17 side.

On 4 November 2022, Minteh received his first call-up to the Gambia national team for friendly matches against DR Congo and Liberia. Minteh scored his first international goal during Gambia's 2–2 draw against Congo.

He participated in the 2023 Africa Cup of Nations in Ivory Coast playing in the last two games of the group stages. Minteh scored his second goal for the Gambia on 8 June 2024 in a 3–1 victory over Seychelles. He scored his third international goal against Gabon in a FIFA World Cup Qualifier.

== Personal life ==
Minteh is a practising Muslim.

== Career statistics ==
=== Club ===
As of match played 8 November 2026

Appearances and goals by club, season and competition
Club	Season	League			National cup (Note: Includes KNVB Cup, FA Cup)		League cup (Note: Includes EFL Cup)		Europe		Other		Total	
Club	Season	Division	Apps	Goals	Apps	Goals	Apps	Goals	Apps	Goals	Apps	Goals	Apps	Goals
OB	2022–23	Danish Superliga	17	4	0	0	—		—		—		17	4
Feyenoord (loan)	2023–24	Eredivisie	27	10	3	0	—		6 (Note: Four appearances and one goal in UEFA Champions League, two appearances in UEFA Europa League)	1	1 (Note: Appearance in Johan Cruyff Shield)	0	37	11
Brighton & Hove Albion	2024–25	Premier League	32	6	4	1	1	0	—		—		37	7
Brighton & Hove Albion	2025–26	Premier League	34	3	1	0	1	0	—		—		36	3
Brighton & Hove Albion	2026–27	Premier League	1	0	0	0	1	0	0	0	—		2	0
Brighton & Hove Albion	Total		67	9	5	1	3	0	0	0	—		75	10
Career total			111	23	8	1	3	0	6	1	1	0	129	25

=== International ===
As of match played 17 November 2026

Appearances and goals by national team and year
National team	Year	Apps	Goals
Gambia	2022	1	0
Gambia	2023	1	1
Gambia	2024	11	3
Gambia	2025	6	3
Gambia	2026	3	1
Total		22	8

Scores and results list the Gambia's goal tally first.

List of international goals scored by Yankuba Minteh
No.	Date	Venue	Cap	Opponent	Score	Result	Competition
1	10 September 2023	Marrakesh Stadium, Marrakesh, Morocco	2	Congo	1–2	2–2	2023 Africa Cup of Nations qualification
2	8 June 2024	Berkane Municipal Stadium, Berkane, Morocco	5	Seychelles	3–1	5–1	2026 FIFA World Cup qualification
3	11 June 2024	Stade de Franceville, Franceville, Gabon	6	Gabon	1–0	2–3	2026 FIFA World Cup qualification
4	11 October 2024	Larbi Zaouli Stadium, Casablanca, Morocco	9	Madagascar	1–1	1–1	2025 Africa Cup of Nations qualification
5	20 March 2025	Alassane Ouattara Stadium, Abidjan, Ivory Coast	14	Kenya	2–0	3–3	2026 FIFA World Cup qualification
6	5 September 2025	Moi International Sports Centre, Nairobi, Kenya	16	Kenya	2–0	3–1	2026 FIFA World Cup qualification
7	10 October 2025	Moi International Sports Centre, Nairobi, Kenya	18	Gabon	1–1	3–4	2026 FIFA World Cup qualification
8	17 November 2026	Independence Stadium, Bakau, Gambia	22	Ivory Coast	1–1	2–2	2027 Africa Cup of Nations qualification

== Honours ==
Steve Biko

- GFA League First Division: third place 2021–22

Feyenoord

- KNVB Cup: 2023–24
