= Aske Adelgaard =

Danish footballer (born 2003)

Personal information
- Full name: Aske Emil Berg Adelgaard
- Date of birth: 10 November 2003 (age 23)
- Place of birth: Odense, Denmark
- Height: 1.75 m (5 ft 9 in)
- Position: Left-back

Team information
- Current team: FC Twente
- Number: 29

Youth career
- –2019: OB
- 2019–2021: Randers
- 2021–2022: OB

Senior career*
Years	Team	Apps	(Gls)
2022–2024	OB	40	(0)
2024–2026	Go Ahead Eagles	49	(0)
2026–	FC Twente	7	(0)

International career^{‡}
2022	Denmark U-20	2	(1)
2023–	Denmark U-21	12	(1)
- * Club domestic league appearances and goals as of 22:00, 25 October 2026 (UTC) ‡ National team caps and goals as of 15:47, 11 October 2025 (UTC)

Aske Emil Berg Adelgaard (born 10 November 2003) is a Danish professional footballer who plays as a left-back for Eredivisie club FC Twente.

== Career ==
=== OB ===
Adelgaard is a product of OB club in Denmark, where he began his career. In the summer 2019, Adelgaard moved to Randers FC, before returning to OB in January 2021—after one and a half year—and signing a deal until June 2023.

Over the summer, Aske took part in several first team training sessions during the start of the season, and he also got a starting place in a training match against FC Midtjylland in May. On 31 July 2022 OB confirmed, that 18-year old Adelgaard had signed a five-year contract with the club and had been permanently promoted to the first team squad. Adelgaard got his official debut a week later, on 7 August 2022, against AGF.

=== Go Ahead Eagles ===
On 19 August 2024, it was confirmed that Adelgaard had joined Eredivisie club Go Ahead Eagles on a contract until June 2028, where he was reunited with former teammate Jakob Breum.

=== Twente ===
On 16 June 2026, fellow club FC Twente confirmed the purchase of Adelgaard for a reported fee of €350 thousand on a four-year contract plus an option to extend for a further year.

== Career statistics ==
As of match played 25 October 2026

Appearances and goals by club, season and competition
Club	Season	League			National Cup		Europe		Other		Total	
Club	Season	Division	Apps	Goals	Apps	Goals	Apps	Goals	Apps	Goals	Apps	Goals
OB	2022–23	Danish Superliga	22	0	0	0	—		—		22	0
OB	2023–24	Danish Superliga	18	0	2	0	—		—		20	0
OB	Total		40	0	2	0	—		—		42	0
Go Ahead Eagles	2024–25	Eredivisie	22	0	5	0	—		—		27	0
Go Ahead Eagles	2025–26	Eredivisie	27	0	3	0	5 (Note: Appearances in UEFA Europa League)	0	1 (Note: Appearance in Johan Cruyff Shield)	0	36	0
Go Ahead Eagles	Total		49	0	8	0	5	0	1	0	63	0
FC Twente	2026–27	Eredivisie	7	0	0	0	7 (Note: Two appearances and one goal in UEFA Europa League, five appearances in UEFA Conference League)	1	—		14	1
Career total			96	0	10	0	12	1	1	0	119	1

== Honours ==
Go Ahead Eagles

- KNVB Cup: 2024–25
