= Alasana Manneh =

Gambian footballer (born 1998)

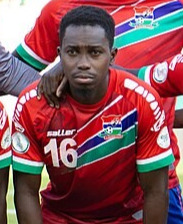

Personal information
- Full name: Alasana Manneh
- Date of birth: 8 April 1998 (age 28)
- Place of birth: Banjul, The Gambia
- Height: 1.70 m (5 ft 7 in)
- Position: Midfielder

Team information
- Current team: Kolding IF

Youth career
- 2012–2016: Aspire Academy
- 2016–2017: Barcelona

Senior career*
Years	Team	Apps	(Gls)
2017–2019	Barcelona B	0	(0)
2017–2018	→ Sabadell (loan)	2	(1)
2018–2019	→ Etar (loan)	36	(4)
2019–2022	Górnik Zabrze	85	(6)
2019	Górnik Zabrze II	5	(1)
2022–2025	OB	56	(3)
2025–2026	Hibernian	5	(0)
2026–	Kolding IF	0	(0)

International career^{‡}
2016–	Gambia	21	(1)
- * Club domestic league appearances and goals as of 14:01, 29 August 2025 (UTC) ‡ National team caps and goals as of 9 June 2025

Alasana Manneh (born 8 April 1998) is a Gambian professional footballer who plays as a midfielder for Danish 1st Division club Kolding IF. He has previously played for Barcelona B, Sabadell, Etar, Górnik Zabrze, OB and Hibernian. Manneh has represented Gambia and made his full international debut in 2016.

== Career ==
=== Barcelona ===
Born in Banjul, Manneh joined FC Barcelona's youth setup in 2016, from Aspire Academy. In July 2017 he was promoted to the reserves.

==== Sabadell (loan) ====
On 22 August 2017, Manneh was loaned to Segunda División B side CE Sabadell FC. He made his senior debut on 28 October, starting and scoring the first in a 2–0 away win against UE Llagostera.

==== Etar (loan) ====
On 23 January 2018, Manneh moved to Bulgarian side Etar Veliko Tarnovo, also on a temporary deal. Manneh made his debut for Etar on 17 February 2018, starting in a 3–3 home draw against Septemvri Sofia. His first professional goal came on 8 March, as he scored the equalizer in a 1–2 away loss against CSKA Sofia.

=== Górnik Zabrze ===
In July 2019, Manneh signed a contract with Polish club Górnik Zabrze.

=== Odense ===
On the transfer deadline day, 31 August 2022, Manneh was transferred to Danish Superliga club OB, joining them on a three-year contract.

=== Hibernian ===
On 28 January 2025, Manneh signed for Scottish Premiership club Hibernian on a three-and-a-half year deal for an undisclosed fee. On 16 February 2025, Manneh was sent off after incurring two yellow cards on his league debut for Hibernian against St. Mirren. Manneh made nine appearances during 18 months with Hibs, before he was released from his contract in August 2026.

=== Kolding IF ===
Following his release by Hibernian, Manneh signed a one-year contract with Danish 1st Division club Kolding IF.

== International career ==
Manneh made his full international debut for the Gambia national team on 30 May 2016, coming on as a substitute in a 0–0 friendly draw against Zambia. In January 2024, he was included in the country's squad for the 2023 Africa Cup of Nations.

== Career statistics ==
=== Club ===
As of match played 14 August 2025

Appearances and goals by club, season and competition
Club	Season	League			National cup (Note: Includes Bulgarian Cup, Polish Cup, Danish Cup)		Continental		Other		Total	
Club	Season	Division	Apps	Goals	Apps	Goals	Apps	Goals	Apps	Goals	Apps	Goals
Barcelona B	2017–18	Segunda División	0	0	0	0	—		—		0	0
Sabadell (loan)	2017–18	Segunda División B	2	1	0	0	—		—		2	1
Etar (loan)	2017–18	First League	15	2	0	0	—		—		15	2
Etar (loan)	2018–19	First League	21	2	2	0	—		—		23	2
Etar (loan)	Total		36	4	2	0	—		—		38	4
Górnik Zabrze	2019–20	Ekstraklasa	24	1	1	0	—		—		25	1
Górnik Zabrze	2020–21	Ekstraklasa	27	3	3	1	—		—		30	4
Górnik Zabrze	2021–22	Ekstraklasa	30	2	2	0	—		—		32	2
Górnik Zabrze	2022–23	Ekstraklasa	4	0	0	0	—		—		4	0
Górnik Zabrze	Total		85	6	6	1	—		—		91	7
Górnik Zabrze II	2019–20	III liga, gr. III	5	1	0	0	—		—		5	1
OB	2022–23	Superliga	18	1	1	0	—		—		19	1
OB	2023–24	Superliga	21	2	2	0	—		—		23	2
OB	2024–25	Danish 1st Division	17	0	1	0	—		—		18	0
OB	Total		56	3	4	0	—		—		60	3
Hibernian	2024–25	Scottish Premiership	4	0	—		—		—		4	0
Hibernian	2025–26	Scottish Premiership	1	0	0	0	3 (Note: One appearance in UEFA Europa League, two appearances in UEFA Conference League)	0	1 (Note: Appearance in Scottish League Cup)	0	5	0
Hibernian	Total		5	0	0	0	3	0	1	0	9	0
Career total			189	15	12	1	3	0	1	0	205	16

=== International ===
As of match played 9 June 2025

Appearances and goals by national team and year
National team	Year	Apps	Goals
Gambia	2016	1	0
Gambia	2018	1	0
Gambia	2019	1	0
Gambia	2020	1	0
Gambia	2021	2	0
Gambia	2023	4	0
Gambia	2024	8	0
Gambia	2025	2	1
Total		21	1

Scores and results list Gambia goal tally first, score column indicates score after each Manneh goal

List of international goals scored by Alasana Manneh
No.	Date	Venue	Opponent	Score	Result	Competition
1	9 June 2025	Marrakesh Stadium, Marrakesh, Morocco	Uganda	1–1	1–1	Friendly
