= Alen Mustafić =

Bosnian footballer

Personal information
- Full name: Alen Mustafić
- Date of birth: 5 July 1999 (age 27)
- Place of birth: Tuzla, Bosnia and Herzegovina
- Height: 1.85 m (6 ft 1 in)
- Position: Midfielder

Team information
- Current team: Slovan Bratislava
- Number: 20

Youth career
- Sloboda Tuzla
- 2015–2018: Sarajevo

Senior career*
Years	Team	Apps	(Gls)
2018–2020	Sarajevo	25	(1)
2020	→ Slovan Bratislava (loan)	2	(0)
2020–2022	Slovan Bratislava	33	(2)
2020–2021	→ Nitra (loan)	31	(2)
2023–2024	OB	10	(1)
2024	→ Śląsk Wrocław (loan)	6	(0)
2024	→ Śląsk Wrocław II (loan)	4	(0)
2024–	Slovan Bratislava	37	(3)
2026	→ Komárno (loan)	10	(1)

International career
2017–2018	Bosnia and Herzegovina U19	6	(0)
- * Club domestic league appearances and goals as of 20:02, 31 October 2026 (UTC)

Alen Mustafić (Bosnian pronunciation: [ǎlen mǔstafitɕ]; born 5 July 1999) is a Bosnian professional footballer who plays as a midfielder for Slovak First League club Slovan Bratislava.

Mustafić started his professional career at Sarajevo, who loaned him to Slovan in 2020. Later that year, after signing permanently with the Slovak side, he was sent on loan to Nitra. In 2023, he joined Danish side OB, and spent the first half of 2024 on loan at Polish club Śląsk Wrocław.

== Club career ==
=== Early career ===
Mustafić started playing football at his hometown club Sloboda Tuzla, before joining Sarajevo's youth academy in 2015. He made his professional debut against Radnik Bijeljina on 25 February 2018 at the age of 18. On 15 September 2019, he scored his first professional goal in a triumph over Zvijezda 09.

In January 2020, Mustafić was loaned to Slovak side Slovan Bratislava until the end of season, with an option to make the transfer permanent, which was activated in July. In August, he was sent on a season-long loan to Nitra.

On 12 January 2024, after spending the previous year with Danish side OB, Mustafić joined Polish club Śląsk Wrocław on loan until the end of the season. After finishing his loan spell, Mustafić returned to OB.

On 22 July 2024, Mustafić returned to Slovan Bratislava on a three-year contract.

== International career ==
Mustafić was a member of Bosnia and Herzegovina under-19 team under coach Toni Karačić.

== Career statistics ==
=== Club ===
As of match played 3 November 2026

Appearances and goals by club, season and competition
Club	Season	League			National cup (Note: Includes Bosnian Cup, Slovak Cup, Danish Cup)		Continental		Total	
Club	Season	Division	Apps	Goals	Apps	Goals	Apps	Goals	Apps	Goals
Sarajevo	2017–18	Bosnian Premier League	9	0	—		—		9	0
Sarajevo	2018–19	Bosnian Premier League	9	0	4	0	2 (Note: Appearances in UEFA Europa League)	0	15	0
Sarajevo	2019–20	Bosnian Premier League	7	1	0	0	2	0	9	1
Sarajevo	Total		25	1	4	0	4	0	33	1
Slovan Bratislava (loan)	2019–20	Slovak First Football League	2	0	2	0	—		4	0
Nitra (loan)	2020–21	Slovak First Football League	31	2	2	1	—		33	3
Slovan Bratislava	2021–22	Slovak First Football League	16	2	7	3	1 (Note: Appearance in UEFA Champions League)	0	24	5
Slovan Bratislava	2022–23	Slovak First Football League	17	0	3	1	9 (Note: One appearance in UEFA Champions League, eight appearances in UEFA Europa Conference League)	0	29	1
Slovan Bratislava	Total		33	2	10	4	10	0	53	6
OB	2022–23	Danish Superliga	6	1	—		—		6	1
OB	2023–24	Danish Superliga	4	0	2	0	—		6	0
OB	Total		10	1	2	0	—		12	1
Śląsk Wrocław (loan)	2023–24	Ekstraklasa	6	0	—		—		6	0
Śląsk Wrocław II (loan)	2023–24	III liga, group III	4	0	—		—		4	0
Slovan Bratislava	2024–25	Slovak First Football League	17	0	3	0	5	0	25	0
Slovan Bratislava	2025–26	Slovak First Football League	8	0	2	2	7 (Note: Three appearances in UEFA Champions League, four appearances in UEFA Conference League)	0	17	2
Slovan Bratislava	2026–27	Slovak First Football League	12	3	1	0	10	0	23	3
Slovan Bratislava	Total		37	3	6	2	22	0	65	5
Komárno (loan)	2025–26	Slovak First Football League	10	1	—		—		10	1
Career total			158	10	26	7	37	0	219	17

== Honours ==
Sarajevo

- Bosnian Premier League: 2018–19
- Bosnian Cup: 2018–19

Slovan Bratislava

- Slovak First League: 2019–20, 2021–22
- Slovak Cup: 2019–20
