= Nicklas Mouritsen =

Danish footballer (born 1995)

Personal information
- Full name: Nicklas Mouritz Mouritsen
- Date of birth: 15 March 1995 (age 31)
- Place of birth: Copenhagen, Denmark
- Position: Left-back

Team information
- Current team: B.93
- Number: 3

Youth career
- B.93
- 2012–2014: Nordsjælland

Senior career*
Years	Team	Apps	(Gls)
2012	B.93	10	(0)
2014–2016	Nordsjælland	17	(0)
2016–2018	Roskilde	36	(0)
2018–2019	Lyngby	30	(0)
2019–2020	Roskilde	25	(1)
2020–2021	Skive	9	(0)
2021–2023	Helsingør	84	(7)
2023–2024	OB	23	(0)
2024–2026	B.93	46	(2)
2026	Lyngby	8	(0)
2026–	B.93	10	(3)

International career
2013	Denmark U18	1	(0)
2013–2014	Denmark U19	4	(0)
2014–2016	Denmark U20	3	(0)
- * Club domestic league appearances and goals as of 3 October 2026

Nicklas Mouritz Mouritsen (born 15 March 1995) is a Danish professional footballer who plays as a left-back for Danish 2nd Division club B.93.

== Club career ==
=== B.93 ===
At the age of just 16, Mouritsen already got his first team debut for B.93 in the Danish 2nd Division. He played 10 league matches.

=== FC Nordsjælland ===
Mouritsen joined FC Nordsjælland in 2012, where he played 2 years on the youth teams. He was permanently moved to the first team squad in the summer 2014, at the age of 19.

On 24 September 2014, Mouritsen got his first team debut for FCN, when he played in a Danish Cup match against SC Egedal, who FCN lost 4–5. He got his Danish Superliga debut against Hobro IK on 28 February 2015, where he played the whole match.

=== FC Roskilde ===
On the last day of the summer transfer market, Mouritsen got his contract with FCN terminated, and joined FC Roskilde. After playing for the club in two seasons, FC Roskilde announced on 3 June 2018, that Mouritsen alongside two other teammates, would leave the club this summer.

=== Lyngby BK ===
Mourtisen signed for Lyngby Boldklub on 11 July 2018. He left the club at the end of the season.

=== Return to FC Roskilde ===
On 7 September 2019, FC Roskilde announced that Mouritsen had returned to FC Roskilde. He left the club again at the end of the year. However, on 31 January 2020, he signed a new contract for the rest of the season.

=== Skive IK ===
On 15 October 2020, Mouritsen moved to Skive IK.

=== FC Helsingør ===
After only three months at Skive, Mouritsen joined fellow league club FC Helsingør on 28 January 2021.

=== OB ===
On 18 August 2023, Mouritsen was bought free by Danish Superliga club OB, signing a deal with the club until June 2026.

=== Return to B.93 ===
Ahead of the 2024–25 season, Mouritsen returned to his former club, B.93. During the season, Mouritsen was also affiliated with the club's academy as a coach, as he was simultaneously completing a 'Topplayer coach education' at the DBU.

=== Return to Lyngby ===
On 30 January 2026, Mouritsen returned to Lyngby Boldklub, signing a deal until June 2027.

=== Return to B.93 ===
On 19 June 2026, after securing promotion with Lyngby, Mouritsen returned to his former club B.93, who had been relegated, on a two-year contract.

== Honours ==
Lyngby

- Danish 1st Division: 2025–26
