= Franco Tongya =

Italian footballer (born 2002)

Personal information
- Full name: Franco Daryl Tongya Heubang
- Date of birth: 13 March 2002 (age 24)
- Place of birth: Turin, Italy
- Height: 1.78 m (5 ft 10 in)
- Position: Winger

Team information
- Current team: Gençlerbirliği
- Number: 70

Youth career
- 2006–2009: Brandizzo
- 2009–2021: Juventus

Senior career*
Years	Team	Apps	(Gls)
2020–2021	Juventus U23	10	(0)
2021–2022	Marseille B	14	(4)
2022–2024	OB	27	(3)
2023–2024	→ AEK Larnaca (loan)	30	(6)
2024–2025	Salernitana	28	(3)
2025–	Gençlerbirliği	29	(6)

International career^{‡}
2017–2018	Italy U16	13	(1)
2018–2019	Italy U17	22	(7)
2019	Italy U18	9	(2)
2020–2021	Italy U19	2	(0)
2021–2022	Italy U20	7	(1)
Medal record
Men's football
Representing Italy
UEFA European Under-17 Championship
Silver medal – second place	2019 Republic of Ireland
- * Club domestic league appearances and goals as of 15 August 2026 ‡ National team caps and goals as of 23:01, 7 June 2022 (UTC)

Franco Daryl Tongya Heubang (born 13 March 2002) is an Italian professional footballer who plays as a winger for Süper Lig club Gençlerbirliği.

== Club career ==
=== Early career ===
Born in Turin, Italy, to Cameroonian parents, Tongya began his youth career at Brandizzo when he was about four years old, before moving to Juventus' youth sector in 2009 aged seven. In 2016–17 he captained the under-15 side, helping them win the league title.

Tongya made his Serie C debut for Juventus U23 – the reserve team of Juventus – on 28 September 2020, in a 2–1 win over Pro Sesto. He played 10 league games in the first half of the 2020–21 season.

=== Marseille ===
On 28 January 2021, Tongya joined Ligue 1 Marseille in a deal worth €8 million, with Marley Aké moving to Juventus for the same fee. He made his debut for the reserve team in the Championnat National 2 on 27 February, as a starter in a 0–0 draw against Rumilly-Vallières.

=== Odense Boldklub ===
On 30 August 2022, Tongya joined Danish side OB on a permanent deal, signing a three-year contract with the club. He subsequently made his debut in the Danish Superliga on 4 September, starting the match against Viborg, which ended in a 2-1 defeat for his team.

On 21 October, Tongya scored his first goal with the club, as well as his first professional goal, in a 3–1 league win against Lyngby. On 10 March 2023, he scored with a bicycle kick in a 2-1 league win over Aalborg: thanks to this achievement, he eventually received the "Goal of the Month" prize by the Superligaen.

==== Loan to AEK Larnaca ====
On 2 September 2023, Tongya joined Cypriot First Division side AEK Larnaca on a season-long loan. After finishing his loan spell, Tongya returned to Odense.

=== Salernitana ===
On 13 July 2024, Tongya returned to Italy after signing with newly-relegated Serie B club Salernitana.

On 24 August 2024, Tongya made his Salernitana debut in a 3-2 Serie B defeat to Südtirol.

=== Gençlerbirliği ===
On 6 September 2025, following Salernitana's relegation to Serie C, Tongya left to sign for Turkish club Gençlerbirliği.

== International career ==
Tongya has represented Italy internationally from under-16 to under-19 levels. He played for the under-17 side at the 2019 UEFA European Under-17 Championship, playing five games and scoring Italy's winning goal in the semi-finals against Portugal; Italy eventually lost the final to the Netherlands.

Tongya also took part at the 2019 FIFA U-17 World Cup in Brazil; he played as a starter in all five games and scored a goal in the group stage against the Solomon Islands. Italy were knocked out by hosts Brazil in the quarter-finals.

Both in May and December 2022, he was involved in training camps led by the Italian senior national team's manager, Roberto Mancini, and aimed to the most promising national talents.

== Style of play ==
Mainly a half-winger (Italian: mezzala), Tongya is also capable of playing as an attacking midfielder, or a winger. He initially started out as a forward, before moving to the midfield. He has been described as a dynamic player, with good tactical intelligence and technical ability.

Tongya cited Cristiano Ronaldo as a source of inspiration.

== Career statistics ==
=== Club ===
As of match played 25 April 2025

Appearances and goals by club, season and competition
Club	Season	League			National cup (Note: Includes Coppa Italia, Coupe de France, Danish Cup)		Total	
Club	Season	Division	Apps	Goals	Apps	Goals	Apps	Goals
Juventus U23	2020–21	Serie C	10	0	0	0	10	0
Marseille II	2020–21	National 2	1	0	0	0	1	0
Marseille II	2021–22	National 2	13	4	0	0	13	4
OB	2022–23	Danish Superliga	15	2	1	0	16	2
OB	2023–24	Danish Superliga	6	1	0	0	6	1
Total			21	3	1	0	22	3
AEK Larnaca (loan)	2023–24	Cypriot First Division	30	6	2	1	32	7
Salernitana	2024–25	Serie B	24	3	0	0	24	3
Career total			93	15	3	1	96	16

== Honours ==
Juventus

- Campionato Giovanissimi Nazionali: 2016–17

Italy U17

- UEFA European Under-17 Championship runners-up: 2019
