= Anders Bergholt =

Danish footballer (born 2005)

Personal information
- Full name: Anders Bergholt Pedersen
- Date of birth: 12 September 2005 (age 21)
- Place of birth: Dybbøl, Denmark
- Height: 1.78 m (5 ft 10 in)
- Position: Midfielder

Team information
- Current team: Sønderjyske
- Number: 28

Youth career
- Dybbøl IU
- FC Sønderborg
- Sønderjyske

Senior career*
Years	Team	Apps	(Gls)
2023–	Sønderjyske	14	(0)
2025	→ Brønshøj (loan)	13	(1)
- * Club domestic league appearances and goals as of 19 May 2026

Anders Bergholt Pedersen (born 12 September 2005) is a Danish footballer who plays as a midfielder for Danish Superliga club Sønderjyske.

== Career ==
=== Sønderjyske ===
Growing up in Dybbøl, Bergholt started his football career at the local club, Dybbøl IU, and later also at FC Sønderborg, before moving to Sønderjyske as a U14 player. Here he worked his way up through the club's academy.

In December 2021, 17-year old Bergholt signed his first youth contract with the club. As early as August 2022, 17-year-old Bergholt was on the bench for the first time for a league match for Sønderjyske's first team. On June 4, 2024, in the final match of the season against FC Helsingør, 18-year-old Bergholt made his official debut when he replaced Jose Gallegos in the 72nd minute of the Danish 1st Division match.

In the following two seasons, Bergholt primarily played for the club's U19 team but also got playing time in 10 first-team matches, two of them as a starter. However, in December 2024, he signed a new contract with the club until the end of 2026 and was also permanently promoted to the first-team squad.

In pursuit of more playing time and experience, Bergholt was loaned to the Danish 3rd Division club Brønshøj in August 2025 for the remainder of 2025. Bergholt made 13 league appearances for the club, before returning to Sønderjyske at the end of the year.
