= Luca Kjerrumgaard =

Danish footballer (born 2003)

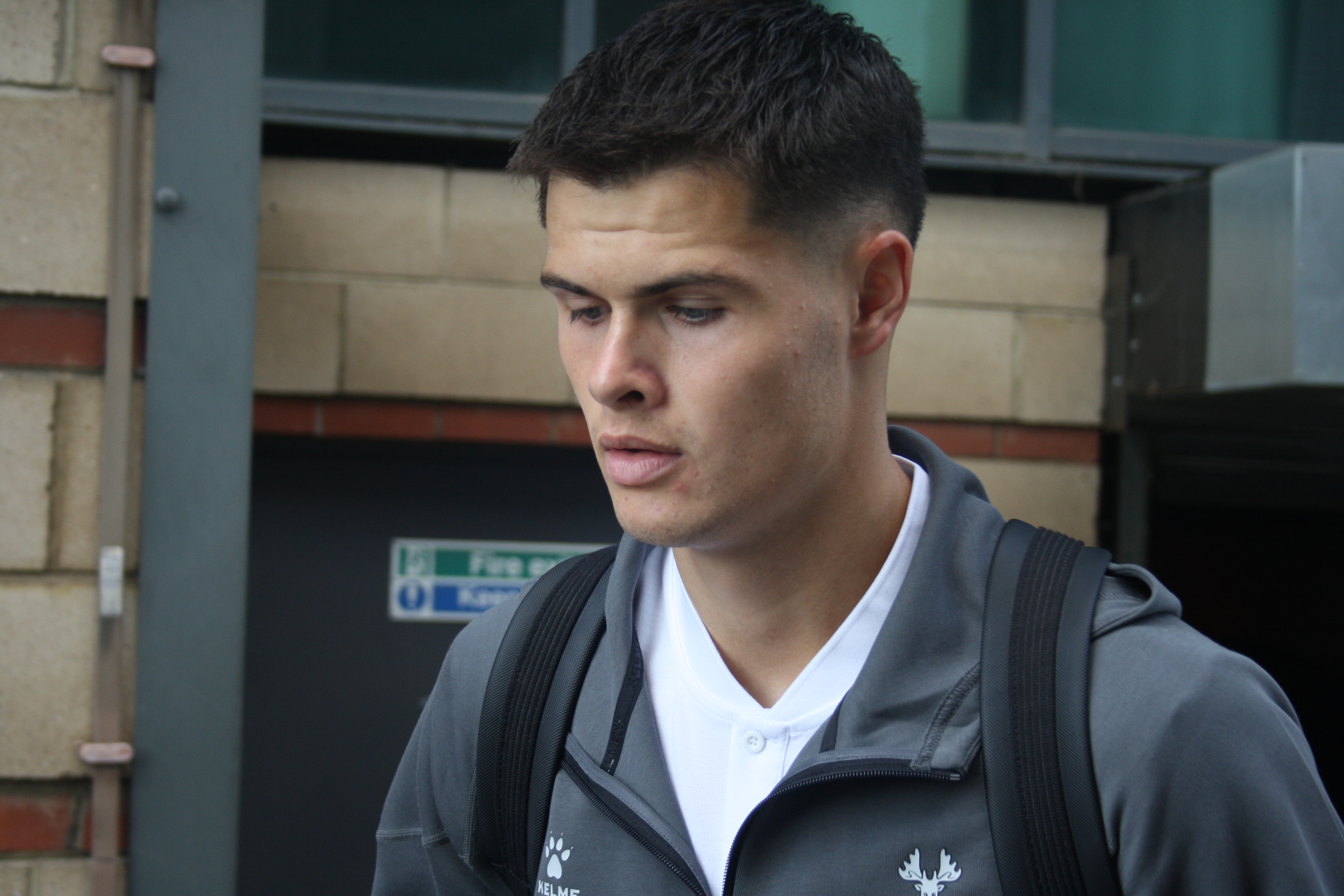
- Kjerrumgaard in 2025

Personal information
- Full name: Luca Tange Kjerrumgaard
- Date of birth: 9 February 2003 (age 23)
- Place of birth: Farum, Denmark
- Height: 1.97 m (6 ft 6 in)
- Position: Forward

Team information
- Current team: Watford
- Number: 9

Youth career
- –2015: Dalum IF
- 2015–2022: OB

Senior career*
Years	Team	Apps	(Gls)
2022–2025	OB	47	(26)
2022–2023	→ Nykøbing (loan)	25	(13)
2023	→ Stabæk (loan)	11	(0)
2025–2026	Udinese	0	(0)
2025–2026	→ Watford (loan)	43	(9)
2026–	Watford	9	(2)

International career^{‡}
2024	Denmark U20	1	(2)
2024–2025	Denmark U21	3	(1)
- * Club domestic league appearances and goals as of 17 October 2026 ‡ National team caps and goals as of 20 March 2025

Luca Tange Kjerrumgaard (born 9 February 2003) is a Danish professional footballer who plays as a forward for EFL Championship club Watford.

== Club career ==
=== OB and loans ===
Kjerrumgaard began his career at Dalum IF before joining OB as an under-13 player. He progressed through the youth ranks, establishing himself as a prominent goal scorer over the years. In September 2021, Kjerrumgaard was called up for his first professional game with OB, a Danish Cup match against Roskilde. However, he remained on the bench for the entire game. On 29 October 2021, OB confirmed that 18-year-old Kjerrumgaard had signed his first professional contract and would be permanently promoted to the first-team squad starting in the 2022–23 season.

Shortly after becoming a regular part of the first-team squad, Kjerrumgaard made his official debut for OB. He came off the bench to replace Ayo Simon Okosun in the final minutes of the season opener against Nordsjælland on 18 July 2022. Kjerrumgaard also played in the following three matches.

However, on 31 August 2022, it was confirmed that Kjerrumgaard had been loaned to Danish 1st Division side Nykøbing FC for the remainder of the season. After a successful season at Nykøbing, where he scored 13 goals in 25 games, Kjerrumgaard returned to OB ahead of the 2023–24 season.

At the start of the 2023–24 season, Kjerrumgaard made two appearances for OB. However, on 1 September 2023, it was confirmed that he would spend the rest of the year on loan with Norwegian side Stabæk. He made 11 appearances for the club without scoring, before returning to OB.

On 9 February 2024, Kjerrumgaard extended his contract with OB until 2027. He scored his first competitive goal for the club on 6 May after coming on as a late substitute in a 3–2 league loss to Vejle. He then scored three goals in the following three consecutive games but was unable to prevent OB's relegation to the Danish 1st Division.

Kjerrumgaard became a regular starter in OB's attack at the beginning of the 2024–25 season, and scored five goals in the first four games.

=== Udinese ===
On 16 July 2025, Kjerrumgaard signed for Serie A club Udinese. He was immediately loaned out to EFL Championship club Watford on a season-long loan. It was reported that there was an obligation for Kjerrumgaard to join Watford permanently at the conclusion of the 2025-26 season.

=== Watford ===
On 24 July 2026, Kjerrumgaard joined Watford on a permanent transfer as part of the obligation of the previous season's loan.

== International career ==
On 9 September 2024, Kjerrumgaard was called up to the Denmark under-20 national team. He made his debut the next day, scoring twice in a friendly match against Sweden U20.

== Style of play ==
Kjerrumgaard is a prolific goal-scorer known for his clinical finishing both with his feet and head. As a forward, he excels in the penalty area, utilising his height and aerial ability to score from crosses and set-pieces. His playing style is characterised by a strong presence in the box and a knack for converting chances. In the later years at OB's academy, he improved his play with his back to goal, becoming more adept in combination play while continuing to refine his duel skills.

== Career statistics ==
As of match played 1 September 2026

Appearances and goals by club, season and competition
Club	Season	League			National cup (Note: Includes Danish Cup, Norwegian Cup, FA Cup)		League cup (Note: Includdes EFL Cup)		Total	
Club	Season	Division	Apps	Goals	Apps	Goals	Apps	Goals	Apps	Goals
OB	2022–23	Danish Superliga	4	0	0	0	—		4	0
OB	2023–24	Danish Superliga	14	4	0	0	—		14	4
OB	2024–25	Danish 1st Division	23	17	1	0	—		24	17
OB	Total		41	21	1	0	—		42	21
Nykøbing (loan)	2022–23	Danish 1st Division	25	13	3	0	—		28	13
Stabæk (loan)	2023	Eliteserien	11	0	0	0	—		11	0
Udinese	2025–26	Serie A	0	0	0	0	0	0	0	0
Watford (loan)	2025–26	Championship	43	9	0	0	1	0	44	9
Watford	2026–27	Championship	2	1	0	0	1	0	3	1
Career total			122	44	4	0	2	0	128	44

== Honours ==
OB

- Danish 1st Division: 2024–25

Individual

- Danish 1st Division Player of the Season: 2024–25
- Danish 1st Division top scorer: 2024–25
