= Omar Jebali =

Tunisian footballer (born 2000)

Personal information
- Date of birth: 19 February 2000 (age 26)
- Place of birth: Tunisia
- Height: 1.90 m (6 ft 3 in)
- Position: Centre-back

Team information
- Current team: Moss
- Number: 5

Senior career*
Years	Team	Apps	(Gls)
2021–2023	ES Zarzis	15	(0)
2022–2023	→ OB (loan)	1	(0)
2023–2025	Vendsyssel	33	(3)
2025–2026	Start	27	(1)
2026–	Moss	15	(1)
- * Club domestic league appearances and goals as of 14 November 2026

Omar Jebali (Arabic: عمر الجبالي; born 19 February 2000) is a Tunisian footballer who plays as a centre-back for Norwegian First Division club Moss.

== Personal life ==
He is a brother of Issam Jebali.

== Club career ==
Playing for ES Zarzis in the Tunisian Ligue Professionnelle 1, he moved to Europe for the first time as he signed a loan deal with Odense Boldklub in July 2022. His brother already played for the same club. Acquiring a work permit dragged out a bit, but he joined OB—though his loan deal was not renewed on expiry.

In January 2025, half a year before his contract ran out, he moved to Norway and IK Start. He was described as having a high maximum level. He needed a few months before he hit his stride, but eventually helped the team win promotion to the 2026 Eliteserien. Jebali made his Eliteserien debut in March 2026 against Aalesund, and played every match but one until the World Cup break.
