= Christian Vestergaard =

Danish footballer (born 2001)

Personal information
- Full name: Christian Vestergaard
- Date of birth: 26 March 2001 (age 25)
- Place of birth: Assens, Denmark
- Height: 1.93 m (6 ft 4 in)
- Position: Centre-back

Team information
- Current team: Horsens
- Number: 3

Youth career
- Assens
- OB

Senior career*
| Years | Team | Apps | (Gls) |
| 2021–2024 | OB | 1 | (0) |
| 2022–2024 | → Kolding (loan) | 50 | (5) |
| 2024–2025 | Kolding | 33 | (1) |
| 2025– | Horsens | 1 | (0) |

International career
| 2017 | Denmark U-16 | 3 | (0) |
| 2017 | Denmark U-17 | 1 | (0) |
- * Club domestic league appearances and goals as of 20:41, 23 August 2025 (UTC)

Christian Vestergaard (born 26 March 2001) is a professional Danish footballer who plays as a centre-back for Danish Superliga side AC Horsens.

== Career ==
=== OB ===
Born in Assens, Vestergaard started his career at Assens FC, before joining OB at the age of 13.

In October 2019, Vestergaard sat on the bench for two Danish Superliga games, however, without getting his debut for the club. On 23 January 2020, shortly after undergoing cruciate ligament surgery after being injured in the same month, 18-year old Vestergaard signed a new deal with OB, running from 1 July 2021 and 1,5 years onwards, which also secured him a permanent promotion to the first team squad from the summer 2020.

After being out for two out of the last three years, Vestergaard finally got his official debut for OB in a Danish Cup game against FC Midtjylland, playing the whole game. Vestergaard also got his Danish Superliga debut on 24 May 2021 against AC Horsens.

=== Kolding IF ===
On 31 May 2021, Vestergaard signed a contract extension with OB until July 2024. To gain some experience, it was confirmed on 24 June 2022, that Vestergaard would spend the upcoming 2022–23 season on loan at Danish 2nd Division club Kolding IF. Appearing in 28 league games during the season, Vestergaard helped Kolding secure promotion to the Danish 1st Division for the 2023–24 season. Following this, OB also confirmed that Vestergaard would spend another season on loan in Kolding.

On April 18, 2024, Kolding confirmed that they had signed Vestergaard to a permanent deal until June 2027, effective from the 2024–25 season.

=== AC Horsens ===
On 19 August 2025, Vestergaard was sold to fellow league club, Danish 1st Division side AC Horsens, signing a deal until June 2029. In his debut match a few days after the transfer, Vestergaard was hit by a cruciate ligament injury that was expected to keep him out for the rest of the season.
