= Lyngby Stadium =

Stadium in Kongens Lyngby, Denmark

Coordinates: 55°46′53″N 12°30′20″E

Lyngby Stadion
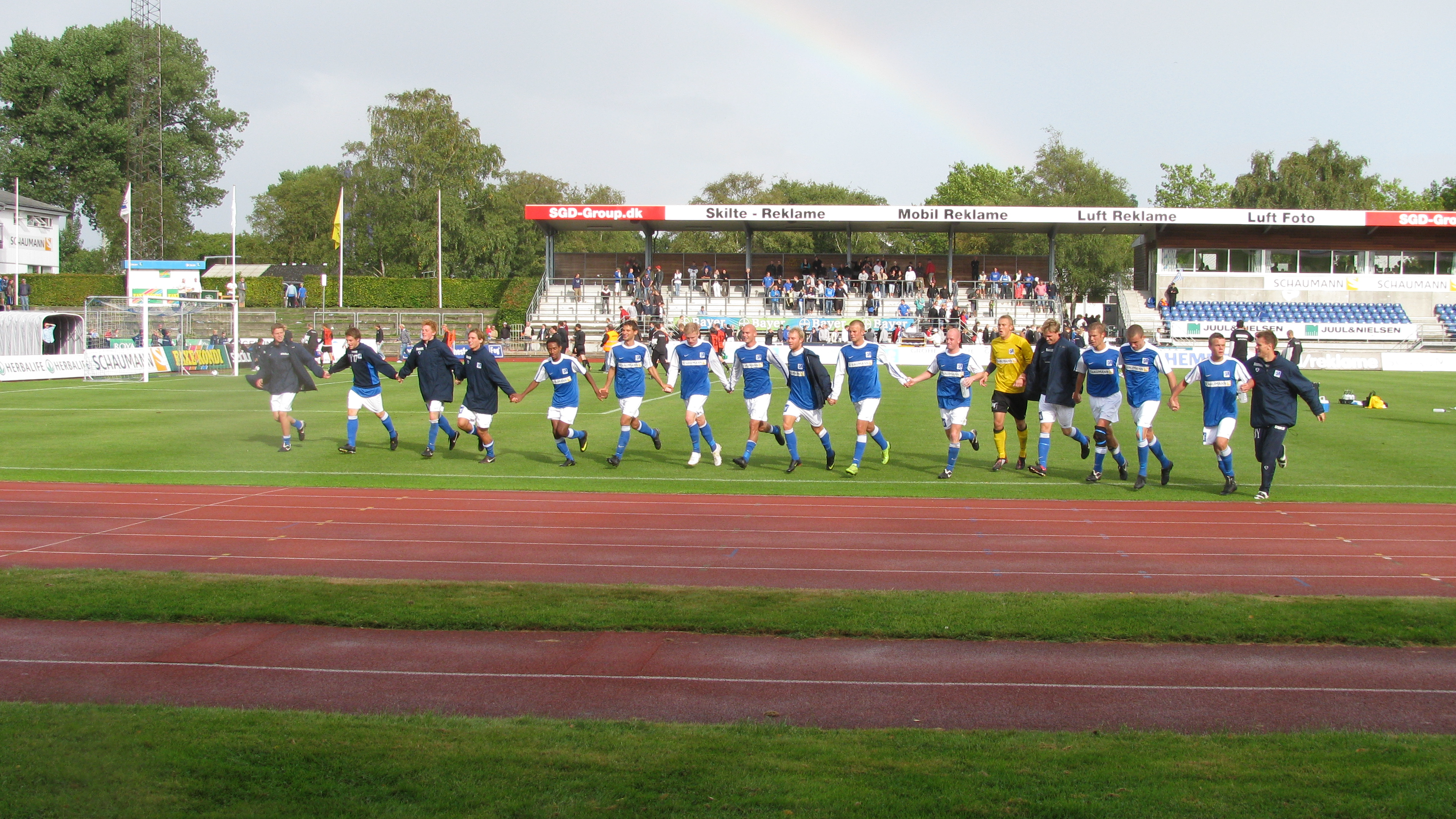
- Interactive map of Lyngby Stadion
- Location: Lundtoftevej 53, 2800 Kongens Lyngby
- Capacity: 10,000
- Surface: Grass

Construction
- Built: 1949

Tenants
- Lyngby Boldklub; Trongårdens IF

Lyngby Stadion is a combined football and athletics stadium in Kongens Lyngby, Denmark. It is owned by the municipality of Lyngby-Taarbæk. It is the home of the football club Lyngby Boldklub, and Trongårdens IF athletics association.

The stadium has a capacity of approximately 10,000 with 3,100 seated. The stadium was taken in use for Lyngby in 1949 and it consists of two stands, the "old" and the "new" stand. The old stand was built in 1968 and the new stand, which primarily is a no-seated stand followed. Lights were installed in 1964. In 1989 the "new" clubhouse by the stadium was taken in use. In 2007 and 2008 there were many discussions if the stadium should be expanded, or whether Lyngby-Taarbæk municipality should build a new stadium for the club.
