= Tobias Slotsager =

Danish footballer (born 2006)

Personal information
- Date of birth: 1 January 2006 (age 20)
- Place of birth: Morud, Denmark
- Height: 1.90 m (6 ft 3 in)
- Position: Centre-back

Team information
- Current team: Hellas Verona
- Number: 19

Youth career
- 2010–2019: Morud IF
- 2019–2022: OB

Senior career*
Years	Team	Apps	(Gls)
2022–2025	OB	57	(1)
2025–	Hellas Verona	8	(0)

International career^{‡}
2021–2022	Denmark U16	4	(0)
2022–2023	Denmark U17	8	(1)
2023–	Denmark U19	8	(0)
2024–	Denmark U21	1	(0)
- * Club domestic league appearances and goals as of 25 May 2025 ‡ National team caps and goals as of 25 March 2025

Tobias Slotsager (born 1 January 2006) is a Danish professional footballer who plays as a centre-back for Serie B club Hellas Verona.

== Club career ==
Slotsager was born in Morud, a suburb of Odense, where he started playing football for Morud IF. Initially positioned as an attacking midfielder and as a striker, Slotsager grew into a promising centre-back after joining Odense Boldklub (OB)'s academy at age 13. On his 15th birthday, he signed a three-year contract with the club.

At the age of only 16, Slotsager made his professional debut on 21 May 2022 against Vejle Boldklub, where he got 11 minutes on the pitch. On 12 August 2022, he signed his first professional contract with OB.

After impressing in training camp in the winter break of the 2022–23 season, Slotsager grew into a starter in OB's defense. On 11 October 2023, he was named by English newspaper The Guardian as one of the best players born in 2006 worldwide.

On 4 February 2025, Slotsager was officially signed by the Serie A club Hellas Verona. According to media reports, Slotsager signed an agreement until June 2029.

== International career ==
Eligible to represent Denmark. On 17 September 2021, Slotsager made his international debut for the Denmark under-16s in a 1–1 draw during a friendly against Portugal in Kolding. He made two appearances for the U16 team. In August 2022, Slotsager began playing for the Denmark under-17 team.

== Career statistics ==
As of match played 1 December 2024

Appearances and goals by club, season and competition
Club	Season	League			Danish Cup		Europe		Other		Total	
Club	Season	Division	Apps	Goals	Apps	Goals	Apps	Goals	Apps	Goals	Apps	Goals
OB	2021–22	Danish Superliga	1	0	0	0	—		—		1	0
OB	2022–23	Danish Superliga	12	0	0	0	—		—		12	0
OB	2023–24	Danish Superliga	30	1	1	0	—		—		31	1
OB	2024–25	Danish 1st Division	14	0	1	0	—		—		15	0
OB	Total		57	1	2	0	—		—		59	0
Hellas Verona	2024–25	Serie A	0	0	—		—		—		0	0
Career total			57	1	2	0	0	0	0	0	59	1
