= Yaya Bojang =

Gambian footballer (born 2004)

Personal information
- Date of birth: 10 September 2004 (age 22)
- Place of birth: Manduar, The Gambia
- Height: 1.92 m (6 ft 4 in)
- Position: Centre-back

Team information
- Current team: Alverca
- Number: 4

Youth career
- Greater Tomorrow FA

Senior career*
Years	Team	Apps	(Gls)
2021–2024	Real de Banjul	4	(1)
2023	→ OB (loan)	0	(0)
2024–2026	OB	30	(1)
2026–	Alverca	5	(0)

International career^{‡}
2025–	The Gambia	1	(0)
- * Club domestic league appearances and goals as of 5 September 2026 ‡ National team caps and goals as of 22:15, 9 November 2025 (UTC)

Yaya Bojang (born 10 September 2004) is a Gambian professional football player who plays as a centre-back for Primeira Liga club Alverca and The Gambia national team.

== Club career ==
A youth academy of Greater Tomorrow FA, Bojang joined the Gambian club Real de Banjul on 6 May 2021. On 4 May 2023, he joined the Danish club Odense BK on loan until 31 December 2023 with an option to buy. On 9 January 2024, Odense BK activated the option to sign Bojang permanently until 2027.

On 21 July 2026, Bojang moved to Portugal and signed with Alverca.

== International career ==
Bojang was called up to The Gambia national team for a set of 2026 FIFA World Cup qualification matches in October 2025. He debuted with The Gambia in a 7–0 win over Seychelles on 14 October 2025.

== Honours ==
Real de Banjul

- GFA League First Division: 2022–2023

OB

- Danish 1st Division: 2024–25
