= Mihajlo Ivančević =

Serbian footballer

Personal information
- Full name: Mihajlo Ivančević
- Date of birth: 7 April 1999 (age 27)
- Place of birth: Bačka Topola, FR Yugoslavia
- Height: 1.86 m (6 ft 1 in)
- Position: Centre-back

Team information
- Current team: Corvinul Hunedoara
- Number: 15

Youth career
- –2017: Brodarac

Senior career*
Years	Team	Apps	(Gls)
2017–2018	Brodarac		
2018–2019	Proleter Novi Sad	0	(0)
2018–2019	→ Brodarac (loan)		
2019–2022	Spartak Subotica	56	(0)
2022–2025	OB	40	(1)
2024	→ Odd (loan)	13	(0)
2025–2026	Lyngby	19	(0)
2026–	Corvinul Hunedoara	11	(1)

International career
2018	Serbia U19	3	(0)
- * Club domestic league appearances and goals as of 7 November 2026

Mihajlo Ivančević (Serbian Cyrillic: Михајло Иванчевић; born 7 April 1999) is a Serbian professional footballer who plays as a centre-back for Liga I club Corvinul Hunedoara.

== Club career ==
On 27 January 2022 it was confirmed, that Ivančević had joined Danish Superliga club OB on a deal until June 2025. In March 2024, Ivančević joined Eliteserien club Odd on loan until 31 July 2024 with an option to buy.

On 1 May 2025, just under two months before the contract was set to expire, OB confirmed that the parties had mutually agreed to terminate the agreement with immediate effect.

In July 2025, Ivančević joined newly relegated Danish 1st Division side Lyngby Boldklub on a deal until June 2027. On 2 June 2026, Lyngby announced that Ivančević leaves the club.

== Honours ==
Brodarac

- Belgrade Zone League: 2017–18

OB

- Danish 1st Division: 2024–25

Lyngby

- Danish 1st Division: 2025–26
