= Leeroy Owusu =

Dutch footballer (born 1996)

Personal information
- Full name: Leeroy Owusu
- Date of birth: 13 August 1996 (age 30)
- Place of birth: Purmerend, Netherlands
- Height: 1.74 m (5 ft 9 in)
- Position: Right-back

Team information
- Current team: OB
- Number: 20

Youth career
- 2004–2014: Ajax

Senior career*
Years	Team	Apps	(Gls)
2014–2018	Jong Ajax	59	(1)
2016–2017	→ Excelsior (loan)	5	(1)
2017–2018	→ Almere City (loan)	29	(1)
2018–2020	De Graafschap	67	(4)
2020–2023	Willem II	98	(2)
2023–	OB	86	(7)

International career^{‡}
2013	Netherlands U17	4	(0)
2013–2014	Netherlands U18	3	(0)
2014−2015	Netherlands U19	9	(0)
2015	Netherlands U20	3	(0)
- * Club domestic league appearances and goals as of 19 May 2026 ‡ National team caps and goals as of 6 August 2018

Leeroy Owusu (born 13 August 1996) is a Dutch professional footballer who plays as a right-back for Odense Boldklub.

== Club career ==
On 15 March 2013, Owusu signed a three-year contract with Ajax, tying him down to the club until 30 June 2016. He made his debut for Jong Ajax as a half-time substitute for Joël Veltman in an Eerste Divisie match against Telstar on 11 August 2014. In November 2014, Owusu extended his contract with Ajax until 2019.

== Career statistics ==
=== Club ===
As of match played 25 May 2024

Appearances and goals by club, season and competition
Club	Season	League			National Cup		Continental		Other		Total	
Club	Season	Division	Apps	Goals	Apps	Goals	Apps	Goals	Apps	Goals	Apps	Goals
Jong Ajax	2014-15	Eerste Divisie	28	1	—		—		—		28	1
Jong Ajax	2015-16	Eerste Divisie	31	0	—		—		—		31	0
Jong Ajax	Total		59	1	—		—		—		59	1
Excelsior (loan)	2016-17	Eredivisie	5	1	2	0	—		—		7	1
Almere City (loan)	2017-18	Eerste Divisie	29	1	2	1	—		6 (Note: Appearance(s) in promotion/relegation play-offs)	0	37	2
De Graafschap	2018-19	Eredivisie	34	1	2	1	—		4	0	40	2
De Graafschap	2019-20	Eerste Divisie	29	3	1	0	—		—		30	3
De Graafschap	Total		63	4	3	1	—		4	0	70	5
Willem II	2020-21	Eredivisie	29	0	1	0	0	0	—		30	0
Willem II	2021-22	Eredivisie	31	0	1	0	—		—		32	0
Willem II	2022-23	Eerste Divisie	38	2	1	0	—		1	0	40	2
Willem II	Total		98	2	3	0	0	0	1	0	102	2
OB	2023-24	Danish Superliga	28	0	2	2	—		—		30	2
Career Total			282	9	12	4	0	0	11	0	305	13

== Honours ==
OB

- Danish 1st Division: 2024–25
