= 2021–22 Danish Cup =

DBU Pokalen (The DBU Cup)
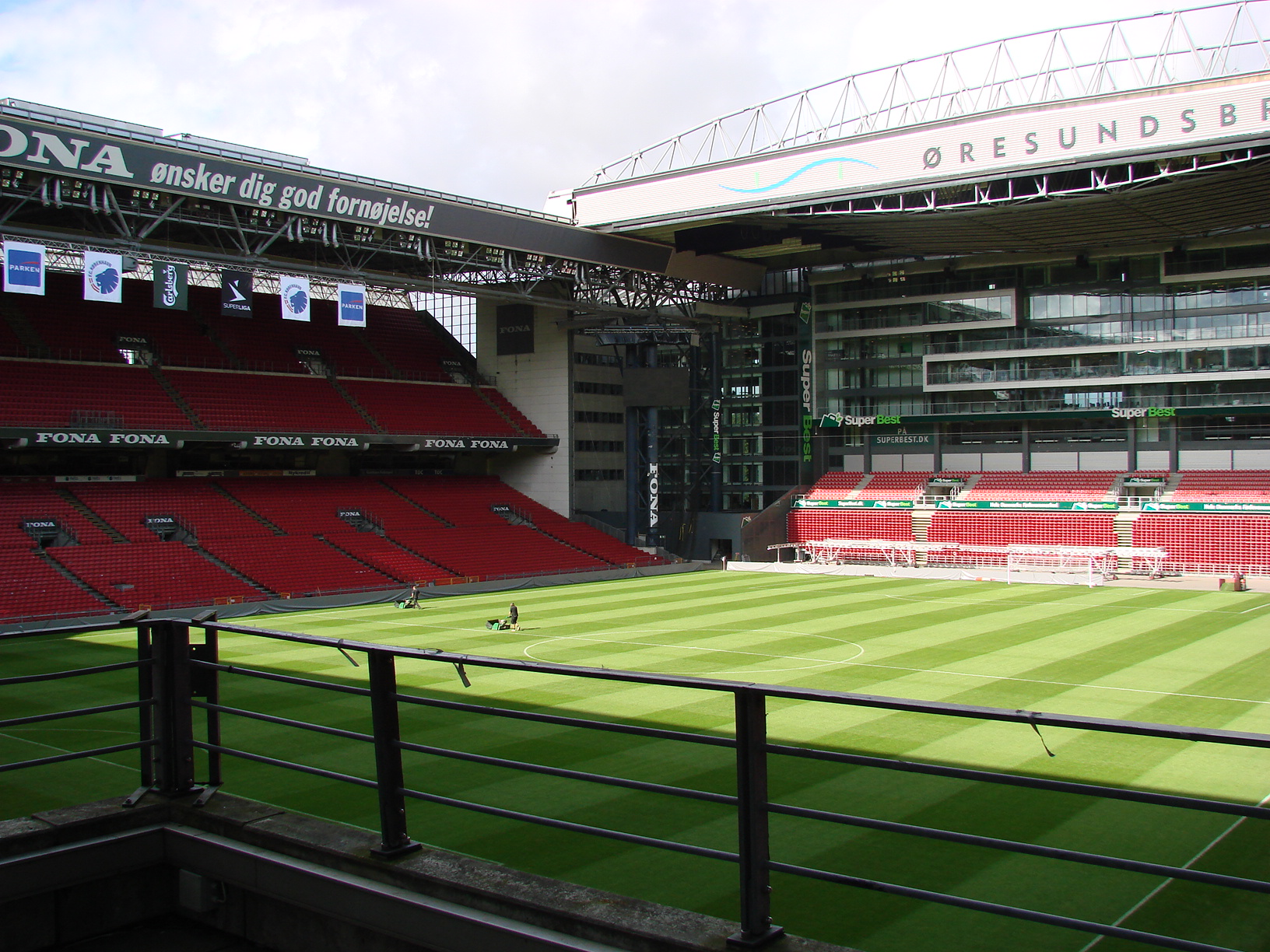
- Parken Stadium hosted the final

Tournament details
- Country: Denmark
- Teams: 104

Final positions
- Champions: FC Midtjylland (2nd title)
- Runners-up: OB

Tournament statistics
- Top goal scorer(s): Morten Olsen (6 goals)

The 2021–22 Danish Cup, also known as Sydbank Pokalen, is the 68th season of the Danish Cup competition. The winner is qualified for the Europa League play-off round.

== Structure ==
92 teams participate in the first round, coming from all levels of competition. Six additional teams will join in the second round, while the top six teams from the 2020–21 Danish Superliga enter in the third round.

Round	Date	Number of fixtures	Clubs remaining	New entries this round	Teams entering this round
First Round	3-5 August 2021	46	104 → 58	40	12 1st Division teams 12 2nd Division teams 8 3rd Division teams 8 Danmarksserien teams
Second Round	31 August-2 September 2021	26	58 → 32	6	6 Superliga teams
Third Round	21-23 September 2021	32	32 → 16	6	6 Superliga teams
Fourth Round	26-28 October 2021	16	16 → 8	None	None
Quarter-Finals	4-5 December 2021 11-12 December 2021	4	8 → 4	None	None
Semi-Finals	27-28 April 2022 4-5 May 2022	2	4 → 2	None	None
Final	26 May 2022	1	2 → 1	None	None

== Participants ==
104 teams competed for the Danish Cup. All teams from the top three divisions in 2020–21 were automatically entered, while 54 teams from lower division teams qualified through qualifying matches to enter the competition proper.

== First round ==
There are 92 teams:

- 54 teams from the qualifying rounds
- 28 teams from 2020-21 Danish 2nd Division
- 10 teams from 2020–21 Danish 1st Division

In the first round of the tournament, 92 teams took part, including 54 clubs from the various levels of the Denmark Series and below, all clubs from the Danish 3rd Division and Danish 2nd Division the 3rd-12th placed teams from the 2020-21 Danish 1st Division and the 11th-12th placed teams from the 2020-21 Danish Superliga. Strandby-Elling-Nielstrup IF was the lowest ranked team, playing in the 10th tier.

The draw was held on Friday, 2 July 2021.

3 August 2021	Brabrand IF (3)	0–0 (a.e.t.) (4–3 p)	Hobro IK (2)	Bradbrand IF's Idrætsanlæg, Brabrand
18:00	Mandal (yellow card) 44'; Boesen (yellow card) 105' (yellow-red card) 108'; Jensen (yellow card) 124'	Report	Avanzini (yellow card) 47'; Hørby (yellow card) 81'; Søgaard (yellow card) 112'	Referee: Michael Rasmussen
	Penalties
	Andersen (penalty scored); Henricksen (penalty scored); Jensen (penalty scored); Pedersen (penalty scored)		(penalty scored) Tjørnelund; (penalty scored) Elkær; (penalty scored) Klitten

3 August 2021	BK Marienlyst (5)	3–0	FC Sydvest 05 (5)	Marienlystcentret, Odense
18:00	Munk 15'; Skærlund 26'; Kjerstad 32'	Report	Snabe (yellow card) 41'; Redzepi (yellow card) 70'	Referee: Anders Eriksen

3 August 2021	Sædding-Guldager IF (6)	1–4	AC Horsens (2)	Guldager Idrætscenter, Esbjerg
18:00		Report	Qamili 5', 38'; Stagaard 75'; Santos 90+3'	Referee: Lasse Label Graagaard

3 August 2021	Tarup-Paarup IF (6)	0–1	Slagelse B&I (6)	Home Tarup Park, Odense
18:00		Report	Traore 51'; Grosen (yellow card) 54'; Djafer-Bey (yellow card) 69'; Lindh (yellow card) 83'; Olsen (yellow card) 90+2'	Referee: Jacob Rasmussen

3 August 2021	Dalum IF (6)	1–4	Kolding IF (3)	Dalum Stadion, Odense
18:00	Schmidt 38'	Report	Daghim 65'; Kudsk 71', 78'; Stentoft 83'	Referee: Chris Johansen

3 August 2021	Næsby BK (4)	3–3 (a.e.t.) (4–5 p)	FC Fredericia (2)	ALPI Arena Næsby, Odense
18:00	Aasgaard 95', 115'; Molberg 101'	Report	Lausen 104'; Nissen 110'; Jensen 120'	Referee: Mads-Kristoffer Kristoffersen
	Penalties
	Aasgaard (penalty scored); Knudsen (penalty scored); Ibsen (penalty scored); Hermansen (penalty scored); Petersen (penalty missed)		(penalty scored) Jensen; (penalty scored) Kristensen; (penalty scored) Lausen; (penalty scored) Nissen; (penalty scored) Nielsen

3 August 2021	FIUK Odense (7)	2–1	Løjt IF (8)	Humlebæk Stadion, Humlebæk
18:00	El-Enazi 47' (pen.); Christiansen (yellow card) 62'; Assaf 85'; Jensen (yellow card) 90'	Report	Thomsen (yellow card) 20' (yellow-red card) 47'; Mortensen 65'	Referee: Sebastian Tornhoj Nielsen

3 August 2021	Holstebro BK (5)	0–2	IF Lyseng (4)	Holstebro Idrætspark, Holstebro
18:00	Lau (yellow card) 30'	Report	Fjendsbo 7' (o.g.); Hersbøll (yellow card) 12' (red card) 33'; Broberg 84'; Nørbygaard (yellow card) 90+3'	Referee: Jacob Stausgaard Kobberrød

3 August 2021	Fuglebakken KFUM (5)	0–2	Skive IK (3)	Højlyngen, Aarhus Vest
18:00	Kastrup (yellow card) 77'; Skov 90+3'	Report	Børsting 17'; Dohn 38'; Skou (yellow card) 75'; Østergaard (yellow card) 90+2'	Referee: Jacob Rasmussen

3 August 2021	BK Avarta (5)	1–3	FA 2000 (3)	Tømrermester Jim Jensens Park, Rødovre
18:00	Ibarra-Hansen 38' (pen.); Mikander (yellow card) 43'; Rasmussen (yellow card) 79'	Report	Jørgensen 20', 74'; Hansen 22'	Referee: Jesper Nielsen

3 August 2021	Skovshoved IF (5)	0–4	Hillerød Fodbold (3)	Skovshoved Idrætspark, Klampenborg
18:00	Andersen (yellow card) 81'	Report	Nathansen 22'; Jensen 66'; Arndal 75'; Bøje-Larsen 81'	Referee: Kasper Madsen

3 August 2021	Dianalund IF (8)	0–8	KFUM Roskilde (4)	Dianalund Stadion, Dianalund
18:00	Brodthagen (yellow card) 64'	Report	Lassen 11', 18', 57'; Ølvang 26'; Brodthagen 35' (o.g.); Dumic 39'; Lindberg 64'; Moussa 82'	Referee: Mathias Lykke

3 August 2021	HIK (3)	1–2	B.93 (3)	Gentofte Sportspark, Gentofte
18:00	Larsen (yellow card) 21'; Arndal-Lauritzen 34'; Thorup (yellow card) 55'	Report	Carrara (yellow card) 36'; Rasmussen 64', 88'	Referee: Frida Klarlund

3 August 2021	Vordingborg IF (6)	2–1 (a.e.t.)	Ishøj IF (5)	Vordingborg Stadion, Vordingborg
18:00	Schreiber (yellow card) 28'; Nielsen (yellow card) 45'; Andreasen 51'; Svendsen 112'	Report	Offenberg 25' (pen.); El Idrissi (yellow card) 83'; Badran (yellow card) 94'; Serinkanli (yellow card) 117'	Referee: Gustav Olsen

3 August 2021	BSF (6)	0–2	FC Roskilde (4)	Ballerup Idrætspark, Ballerup
18:00	Larsen (yellow card) 37'; Sørensen (yellow card) 42'	Report	Etim 60' (pen.) (yellow card) 61'; Julø 67' (yellow card) 84'	Referee: Philip Warburg

3 August 2021	SfB-Oure FA (5)	0–6	Middelfart Boldklub (3)	S.f.B. Hellegårdsvej, Svendborg
18:00	Marquardsen (yellow card) 42'; Vejle (yellow card) 85'	Report	Linnet 18', 45'; Kristensen 22'; Berthelsen 52'; Præst 59'; Frederiksen 82' (pen.)	Referee: Jonas Bæk

3 August 2021	Hviding IF/Kvik 70 (9)	0–5	B 1913 (5)	Egebæk-Hviding Aktivitetscenter, Svendborg
18:00		Report	Stokholm 15'; Jørgensen 22'; Venzel 46'; Schousboe 50'; Lassen 52'	Referee: Magnus Rasmussen

3 August 2021	Aabyhøj IF (7)	0–2	Jammerbugt FC (2)	Aabyhøj Stadion, Aabyhøj
18:30	Jepsen (yellow card) 70'	Report	Høgh 50', 54'	Referee: Jacob Karlsen

3 August 2021	Søften GF (7)	0–3	Thisted FC (3)	Søften Idrætsanlæg, Hinnerup
18:30		Report	Andersen 38' (yellow card) 67'; Yao 90+3' (pen.); Agesen 90+5'	Referee: Benjamin Seferovic

3 August 2021	Aalborg Freja (8)	2–1	Give Fremad (7)	Frejaparken, Aalborg
18:30	Nielsen 34'; Staff 60'; Andersen (yellow card) 90+6'; Holt (yellow card) 90+6'	Report	Nørtoft 84' (yellow card) 90+6'; Sørenson (yellow card) 90+6'; Kristensen (yellow card) 90+6'; Hedegaard (yellow card) 90+6'	Referee: Mikkel Gantzel

3 August 2021	Nørresundby FB (5)	0–6	Aarhus Fremad (3)	Nordjyske Bank Arena, Nørresundby
18:30	Hyldahl (yellow card) 31'	Report	Kubel 8', 90'; E. Hauge Mortensen 15', 27'; Hansen 56'; Andreasen 78'	Referee: Patrick Gammelholm

3 August 2021	LUIF (7)	0–9	BK Frem (4)	LUIF´s anlæg, Nykøbing
18:30	S. Christiansen (yellow card) 34'	Report	Helev 5', 61', 89'; Skovgaard 13'; Kristensen 26'; Aslani 33', 42'; Tånnander 41', 46'	Referee: Casper Thorsøe

3 August 2021	Hørsholm-Usserød (6)	0–2	Vanløse IF (4)	Hørsholm Idrætspark, Rungsted Kyst
18:30		Report	Nielsen 11'; Thorup (yellow card) 12'; Jung 75'	Referee: Oliver Simbold

3 August 2021	Holbæk B&I (5)	2–0	Næstved BK (3)	Holbæk Sportsby, Holbæk
19:00	Jensen (yellow card) 7'; Stoltenberg 15', 41'	Report		Referee: Sebastian Friis Aagerup

3 August 2021	FC Nakskov (6)	1–6	Herlev IF (4)	OK Plus Stadion, Nakskov
19:00	Nielsen (pen.); Christiansen (yellow card) 82'	Report	Loughlan 12'; E. Jensen 45+4'; C. Pedersen 49'; L. Pedersen 69'; C. Jensen 83', 86'	Referee: Nicki Hansen

4 August 2021	NB Bornholm (6)	0–5	Allerød FK (5)	Nexø Stadion, Nexø
17:00		Report	Olsen 40', 48', 74'; Virkelyst-Anderssen 41'; Lund 69' (o.g.)	Referee: Gustav Olsen

4 August 2021	Varde IF Elite (5)	3–0	B1909 (5)	Sydbank Stadium, Varde
18:00	Hassing 30'; Andreasen (yellow card) 46'; Matras 72'; Kalmer 90+3'	Report		Referee: Mikkel Gantzel

4 August 2021	Viby IF (6)	1–2	VSK Aarhus (4)	Viby Idrætspark, Viby J
18:00	Christensen (red card) 11'; Møller (yellow card) 17'; Krogh 68'; Lehmann (yellow card) 69'; Hjermind (yellow card) 72'	Report	Skjellerup 24'; Andersen 68' (yellow card) 75' (yellow-red card) 89'	Referee: Morten Helweg Andersen

4 August 2021	Kvik/Aalestrup (8)	1–2	Kjellerup IF (5)	Hvam Stadion, Aalestrup
18:00	Rold (yellow card) 15'; Nielsen 82'	Report	Grønne 14' (yellow card) 74'; Nielsen 87'	Referee: Mathias Levin Pedersen

4 August 2021	DMI (6)	1–8	Frederikssund IK (5)	DMI'sanlæg, Nysted
18:00	Borre 50'; Latocha (yellow card) 59'	Report	Krogh 3', 30'; Jægergaard 14', 84'; Henriksen 15'; Kielsgaard 24'; Hacke 29'; Hansen 48'	Referee: Midjan Hadzidulbic

4 August 2021	Svebølle BI 2016 (7)	1–0	Greve (8)	Svebølle Stadion, Svebølle
18:00	Trier 50'	Report	Christensen (yellow card) 87'	Referee: Mathias Lykke

4 August 2021	B 1908 (5)	1–4	Nykøbing FC (2)	Sundby Idrætspark, Copenhagen
18:00	Nielsen 29' (o.g.); Henningsen (red card) 48'	Report	Lindberg 27', 39' 47' (pen.); Carlson 61'	Referee: Patrick Stenzel Rasmussen

4 August 2021	Fremad Valby (6)	2–1	Brønshøj BK (5)	Valby Idrætspark, Valby Copenhagen
18:00	Ncube 17'; Torp 27'	Report	Veltz 15'; Mustafi (yellow card) 49'; Nielsen (yellow card) 88'	Referee: Jonas Hansen

4 August 2021	Østerbro Idræts-Forening (8)	0–9	Lyngby BK (2)	Lyngby Stadion, Lyngby
18:00		Report	Knudsen 7', 44'; Nielsen 10', 58', 67', 83'; Kaastrup 17'; Winther 37'; Balle 78' (o.g.)	Referee: Benjamin Willaume-Jantzen

4 August 2021	FC Nyhavn (8)	0–4	BK Skjold (6)	Kløvermarken idrettsanlegg, Copenhagen
18:00		Report	Schuster 14' (o.g.); Levinsen 22'; Balling 64' (o.g.); Munk Plum 83'	Referee: Nicki Nordlund Hansen

4 August 2021	AB Tårnby (5)	2–2 (a.e.t.) (6–7 p)	Tårnby FF (5)	Tårnby Stadion, Kastrup
18:00	Warlo 28', 70' (yellow card) 110'; Jensen (yellow card) 82'	Report	da Silva 18'; Kiilerich (yellow card) 27'; Johansson 32'	Referee: Philip Warburg

5 August 2021	Flemløse/Hårby (6)	0–3	Fjordager IF (6)	Flemløse Stadion, Glamsbjerg
18:00		Report	Johansen 7', 27'; Bruun (yellow card) 20'; Søndergaard (yellow card) 56'; Westh 66'; Grønning (yellow card) 88'	Referee: Anders Eriksen

5 August 2021	Bolbro G&IF (8)	1–5	Esbjerg fB (2)	Odense Atletikstadion, Odense
18:00	Nystrup 69'	Report	Winfield 19'; Sørensen 28' (pen.) 32'; Schmidt 36'; Jensen 87'	Referee: Aydin Uslu

5 August 2021	Skibet IF (9)	2–3 (a.e.t.)	Bredballe IF (8)	Skibet Stadion, Vejle
18:00	Gregersen 30'; Mogensen (yellow card) 68'; Runge (yellow card) 87' (yellow-red card) 106'; Christensen (yellow card) 107'; Compaore 117'	Report	Bruhn 73'; Faghir 107' (pen.); Benchaou (yellow card) 114'; Kristensen 115'	Referee: Frederik Svendsen

5 August 2021	FC Kalundborg (9)	1–7	AB (3)	Munkesø Stadion Kunst, Kalundborg
18:00	Lonigro (yellow card) 40'; Pena (yellow card) 45'; Lopreste (yellow card) 57'; Karalic 65'	Report	Christensen 33' (pen.); Kisum 59'; Wass 64'; Oslev (yellow card) 85'	Referee: Benjamin Helm Svedborg

5 August 2021	Virum-Sorgenfri BK (8)	1–2	Nørrebro FF (7)	Virum Stadium, Virum
18:00	Læssøe Amstrup 22'; Jørring (yellow card) 58'	Report	Agbere (yellow card) 42' (goal) 69'; Hassan 80'; Sander (yellow card) 90+1'	Referee: Midjan Hadzidulbic

5 August 2021	Strandby-Elling-Nielstrup IF (10)	1–6	Vendsyssel FF (2)	Nordjyske Bank Arena Strandby, Strandby
18:30	Jensen 7'	Report	Steffensen 31', 41' van der Heyden 33'; Konaté 46', 89'; Boateng 65' (yellow card) 76'	Referee: Lasse Label Graagaard

5 August 2021	Skalborg SK (9)	0–2	Helsted Fremad IF (8)	Skalborg Stadion, Aalborg
19:00	Nørgaard (yellow card) 81'	Report	Siewers (yellow card) 21'; Snog (yellow card) 30' (goal) 33'; Rosborg 90+4'	Referee: Audry Munanira

10 August 2021	BK Viktoria (7)	0–5	Fremad Amager (2)	Fælledparken Kunst, Copenhagen
18:00	Oddershede (yellow card) 73'	Report	Elyounossi 26'; Munksgaard 41'; Fanyé 67', 76'; Soulas 82'; Awara (yellow card) 90'; Bio (yellow card) 90'	Referee: Sebastian Friis Aagerup

10 August 2021	Herstedøster IC (5)	1–9	Hvidovre IF (2)	Herstedøster Stadion, Albertslund
18:00	Castelijns 26'; Leland (yellow card) 57' (yellow-red card) 82'	Report	Fredslund 8', 77', 82'; Smed 19'; Lindberg 20', 53', 65'; Brandt Hansen 64'; Marc Nielsen (yellow card) 79'; M. Lund Nielsen 90'	Referee: Mostafa Seyfi

18 August 2021	FC Helsingør (2)	2-1 (a.e.t.)	HB Køge (2)	Helsingør Ny Stadion OPV, Helsingør
19:00	Czajkowski (yellow card) 23' (goal) 34'; Christensen (yellow card) 60'; Jordan (yellow card) 94' (goal) 106'	Report	Stuberg 48'; Marfelt (yellow card) 57'; Seehusen (yellow card) 63'

== Second round ==
There were 52 teams:

- 46 teams from the 1st round (winners)
- 4 teams from the 2020–21 Danish Superliga (7th–10th placed)
- The 2020–21 Danish 1st Division champions and runners-up

Aalborg Freja, Bredballe IF, and Helsted Fremad IF were the lowest ranked teams left in the tournament.

31 August 2021	Allerød FK (5)	3–0	Herlev IF (5)	Allerød Idrætspark, Lillerød
17:15	Olsen 10', 51', 77'	Report	Wilsky (yellow card) 90+3'	Referee: Niclas Gomes

31 August 2021	Frederikssund IK (6)	0–1	BK Frem (3)	Frederikssund Stadion, Frederikssund
17:15	Kielsgaard (yellow card) 29'; Nielsen (yellow card) 54'	Report	Pind 43'	Referee: Jonathan Garcia Nilton

31 August 2021	VSK Aarhus (3)	3–2	Thisted FC (3)	Vejlby Stadium, Risskov, Aarhus
17:15	Rasmussen 4'; Skjellerup 33'; Bach 90+1'	Report	Friis 1'; Agger 28'; Yao (yellow card) 85'	Referee: Chris Johansen

31 August 2021	Kjellerup IF (5)	2–1	Aarhus Fremad (3)	XL-byg Arena, Kjellerup
17:15	Rasmussen 20'; Mathiasen 50'; Pedersen (yellow card) 55'; Grønne (yellow card) 84'	Report	Hagelskjær (yellow card) 50'; Christensen 63'	Referee: Jacob Karlsen

31 August 2021	Svebølle B&I (7)	0–1	FA 2000 (5)	Svebølle Stadion, Svebølle
17:30	Toft (yellow card) 56'	Report	Meister 78'	Referee: Patrick Stenzel Rasmussen

31 August 2021	B 1913 (5)	0–0 (a.e.t.) (8–7 p)	Jammerbugt FC (3)	Campus Road, Odense
17:30		Report

31 August 2021	FIUK (7)	0–13	AaB (1)	Odense Atletikstadion, Odense
18:00		Report	Kusk 1', 23', 35', 77'; Ross 10', 17'; Makaric 60', 64'; Fossum 66', 83'; Hagelskjær 70'; Hannesbo 72'; Prip 75'	Referee: Mads-Kristoffer Kristoffersen

31 August 2021	BK Marienlyst (5)	3–1	Slagelse B&I (3)	Marienlystcentret, Odense
18:15	Skaerlund 19', 72'; Munk 65'	Report	Kolberg 43'	Referee: Sebastian Tornhoh Nielsen

31 August 2021	B 93 (3)	0–1	Nykøbing FC (2)	Østerbro Stadion, Copenhagen
18:30	Morberg (yellow card) 6'	Report	Johannsen (yellow card) 41'; Gärtig (yellow card) 47'; Kristensen 75'	Referee: Mostafa Seyfi

31 August 2021	Kolding IF (3)	2–1 (a.e.t.)	Esbjerg fB (2)	Autocentralen Park, Kolding
18:30	Olsen 38' (pen.) (yellow card) 59'; Eriksen (yellow card) 73'; Ngongo (yellow card) 90'; Nissen 111'	Report	Korac (yellow card) 37'; Sørensen (yellow card) 48'; Larsen (yellow card) 59'; Pache (yellow card) 64'; Ouzounidis 72'	Referee: Jens Maae

31 August 2021	Holbæk B&I (5)	1–2	Fremad Amager (2)	Holbæk Stadion, Holbæk
19:00	Rønn (yellow card) 32'; Sjørslev (yellow card) 69' (goal) 90+4' (pen.)	Report	Toelhoej 16'; Boysen (yellow card) 27'; Touré 33'; Ravn-Haren (yellow card) 74'	Referee: Benjamin Willaume Jantzen

31 August 2021	Fremad Valby (5)	0–4	Vanløse IF (3)	Valby Idrætspark, Valby, Copenhagen
19:00	El-Itr (yellow card) 81'	Report	Haddouchi 31'; Haages 37'; Andreasen 54'; Risvig 56' (pen.)	Referee: Simon Rasmussen

1 September 2021	Tårnby FF (5)	1–5	Lyngby BK (2)	Vestamager Idrætsanlæg, Vestamager, Copenhagen
17:15	Richter 28'; Hansen (yellow card) 62'; Nielsen (yellow card) 82'	Report	Vendelbo 44'; Gytkjær 59', 66', 87', 88'; Storm (yellow card) 80'	Referee: Jesper Nielsen

1 September 2021	KFUM Roskilde (4)	0–5	AB (3)	Lillevang Idrætscenter, Roskilde
17:15	Blond (yellow card) 5'; Toftdahl (yellow card) 20'	Report	Møller 45'; Christensen 51'; Vang 66', 71'; Kisum 86'	Referee: Sebastian Friis Aagerup

1 September 2021	Hillerød Fodbold (3)	0–5	SønderjyskE (3)	Hillerød Stadium, Hillerød
17:15	Houborg (yellow card) 41'	Report	Taiwo 7', 40', 45'; Prosser 27'; Eskesen 52' (yellow card) 74'; Soulas (yellow card) 64'; Winther (yellow card) 90'	Referee: Anders Poulsen

1 September 2021	Bredballe IF (8)	1–4	Middelfart Boldklub (3)	BAUHAUS Park, Vejle
17:15	Bruhn 4'; Kristensen (yellow card) 17'; Benchaou (yellow card) 45+1'; Jensen (yellow card) 60'	Report	Frederiksen (yellow card) 37' (goal) 45', 67'; Præst 38'; Pedersen 77' (o.g.)	Referee: Stefan Fyhn

1 September 2021	Brabrand IF (3)	4–3	Vendsyssel FF (2)	Brabrand Idrætsanlæg, Brabrand
17:30	Pedersen 36'; Borup 43'; Møberg 67'; Poulsen (yellow card) 69'; Vesterbæk (yellow card) 79'; Lykke 90+2'	Report	Schenk 22'; Bizoza (yellow card) 32'; Søjberg 53'; Montiel 82'; Greve (yellow card) 84'; Steffensen (yellow card) 90+4'	Referee: Mikkel Redder

1 September 2021	FC Roskilde (4)	1–2	OB (1)	Nature Energy Park, Odense
18:00	Mortensen (yellow card) 59'; Noer (yellow card) 64'; Elvang 90+3'	Report	Kløve 35'; Lieder (yellow card) 73'; Kadrii 90+1'	Referee: Peter Kjærsgaard-Andersen

1 September 2021	BK Skjold (6)	1–3	FC Helsingør (2)	Østerbro Stadium, Copenhagen
18:00	Smedegård 18'	Report	Jordan 26'; Christiansen (yellow card) 43'; Drost (yellow card) 51'; Just 68'; Juul Christensen 76'	Referee: Benjamin Helm Svedborg

2 September 2021	Varde IF Elite (5)	0–8	AC Horsens (1)	Sydbank Stadium, Varde
17:15	Blåholm (yellow card) 43'; Jelstrup (yellow card) 50'	Report	Jensen 3'; Qamili 10', 89'; Högnason Eriksen 15' (o.g.); Sigurðarson 19', 56', 81'; Pohl 82'	Referee: Mads-Kristoffer Kristoffersen

2 September 2021	FC Fredericia (2)	1–1 (a.e.t.) (5–3 p)	Viborg FF (1)	Monjasa Park, Fredericia
18:00	Egelund 21'; Nielsen (yellow card) 27'; Kirkegaard (yellow card) 45'; Kjær (yellow card) 82'; Anker (yellow card) 95'	Report	Kramer (yellow card) 16'; Grot 86' (yellow card) 95'; Bonde (yellow card) 16'	Referee: Morten Krogh
	Penalties
	Jensen (penalty scored); Lausen (penalty scored); Holvad (penalty scored); Nissen (penalty scored); Ege Nielsen (penalty scored)		(penalty scored) Grot; (penalty scored) Aaquist; (penalty scored) Kramer

2 September 2021	Skive IK (3)	1–3	Silkeborg IF (1)	Hancock Arena, Skive
19:15	Bager 2'; Skou (yellow card) 84'	Report	Vallys 30'; Helenius 33'; Jørgensen 43'	Referee: Aydin Uslu

7 September 2021	Vordingborg IF (6)	0–2	Vejle BK (1)	Vordingborg Stadion, Vordingborg
17:15		Report	Kolinger 24'; Sousa 47' (pen.)	Attendance: 800

7 September 2021	Fjordager IF (6)	2–3	IF Lyseng (4)	Fjordager IF´s anlæg, Odense
17:15	Rasmussen 43'; Villemoes 73'	Report	Lauritsen 3'; Søndergaard 34'; Klyvø Petersen 49'

8 September 2021	Aalborg Freja (8)	2–1	Helsted Fremad IF (8)	Frejaparken, Aalborg
17:15	Bertel 12'; Nyborg 78'	Report	Snog 9'

8 September 2021	Nørrebro FF (7)	1–3	Hvidovre IF (2)	Mimersparken, Copenhagen
19:30	Oali 33'	Report	Aabech 12' (pen.); Boateng 61', 89'

== Third round ==
There are 32 teams:

- 26 teams from the 2nd round (winners)
- 6 teams from the 2020–21 Danish Superliga (1st–6th placed)

21 September 2021	Brabrand IF (3)	1–3	Kolding IF (3)	Brabrand IF's Idrætsanlæg, Brabrand
16:30	Pedersen (yellow card) 50'; Vesterbæk (yellow card) 83'	Report	S. Sommer (yellow card) 13'; Nissen 39' (T. Sommer); Juhl (yellow card) 90+4'	Referee: Jorgen Daugbjerg Burchardt

21 September 2021	FC Helsingør (2)	0–3	OB (1)	Helsingør Ny Stadion OPV, Helsingør
17:45	Norouzi (yellow card) 75'	Report	Sabbi 11' (Kadrii) (yellow card) 25'; Larsen 19' (Thomasen); Fenger 22'; Tverskov (yellow card) 78'	Referee: Jonas Hansen

21 September 2021	AB (3)	0–2	FC Fredericia (2)	Gladsaxe Stadium, Søborg
18:00		Report	Lausen 44'; Ullum (yellow card) 63'; Nielsen (yellow card) 85'

21 September 2021	Lyngby BK (2)	0–4	AaB (1)	Lyngby Stadion, Lyngby
18:30	Hudu (yellow card) 26'; Magnússon (yellow card) 74'; Kaastrup (yellow card) 86'	Report	Fossum 22' (Trajkovski) (yellow card) 40'; Makarić 31' (Fossum); Børsting 48' (yellow card) 81'; Hannesbo 84' (Kusk)

22 September 2021	Vanløse IF (3)	3–4	Vejle Boldklub (1)
16:30

22 September 2021	B 1913 (5)	3–4	SønderjyskE (1)
16:30

22 September 2021	Kjellerup IF (5)	0–5	FC Midtjylland (1)	XL-byg Arena, Kjellerup, Central Jutland
16:30		Report	Evander 30'; Mabil 34' (Evander); Lind 59' 79' (Mabil); Simsir 65'	Referee: Mads-Kristoffer Kristoffersen

22 September 2021	VSK Aarhus (3)	1–2	FC Nordsjælland (1)
16:30

22 September 2021	Aalborg Freja (8)	1–1 (a.e.t.) (5–4 p)	IF Lyseng (4)
16:30

22 September 2021	Nykøbing FC (2)	3–0	F.C. Copenhagen (1)
18:00

22 September 2021	Fremad Amager (2)	2–3	Randers FC (1)
18:00

22 September 2021	BK Marienlyst (5)	1–2 (a.e.t.)	Middelfart Boldklub (3)
18:30

23 September 2021	BK Frem (3)	0–3	AGF (1)
18:00

23 September 2021	AC Horsens (2)	3–2	Silkeborg IF (1)
18:00

23 September 2021	Allerød FK (5)	1–8	Brøndby IF (1)
19:45

27 September 2021	FA 2000 (5)	0–3	Hvidovre IF (2)
18:15

== Fourth round ==
19 October 2021	Kolding IF (3)	2–2 (a.e.t.) (6–5 p)	Nykøbing FC (2)	Autocentralen Park, Kolding
19:00	Hansen 24' (T. Sommer); S. Sommer 76' (Jespersen)	Report	Ljuti (yellow card) 18'; Jessen 87' (Lindberg); Trier 89' (o.g.)	Referee: Mads-Kristoffer Kristoffersen
	Penalties
	Nissen (penalty scored); Jespersen (penalty missed); Trier (penalty scored); Stentoft (penalty missed); Olsen (penalty scored); Killerich (penalty scored); Tjørnelund (penalty missed); S. Sommer (penalty scored); Petersen (penalty scored)		(penalty scored) Kristensen; (penalty scored) Lindberg; (penalty missed) Andersen; (penalty missed) Egeris; (penalty scored) Carlson; (penalty scored) Delvin; (penalty missed) Ljuti; (penalty scored) Bonde; (penalty missed) Madsen

26 October 2021	AC Horsens (2)	1–3 (a.e.t.)	Vejle Boldklub (1)	CASA Arena Horsens
18:00	Sigurðarson 3' (Lange) (yellow card) 90+2'; Kruse (yellow card) 40'; Lange (yellow card) 47'; Qamili (yellow card) 55'; Jensen (yellow card) 66'; Musonda (yellow card) 73'	Report	Ponce (yellow card) 66'; Sousa (yellow card) 86' (goal) 90+3' 115' (Hetemi); Čustović 105' (Ponce); Kolinger (yellow card) 118'	Referee: Jorgen Daugberg Burchardt

26 October 2021	FC Fredericia (2)	1–2	Hvidovre IF (2)	Monjasa Park
18:00	Basse 11' (Anker); Holvad (yellow card) 62'; Brinch (yellow card) 78'; Olsen (yellow card) 80'; Anker (yellow card) 88'	Report	Thomsen 32' (Nøhr) 78' (Carlsen)	Referee: Jens Maae

27 October 2021	Middelfart Boldklub (3)	0–4	Randers FC (1)	Middelfart Stadion
15:00	Conley (yellow card) 60'; Linnet (yellow card) 76'; Jørgensen (yellow card) 77'	Report	O. Bundgaard 22' (Onovo); Kehinde 61' (pen.); Ankersen 66' (Bundgaard); Odey 75' (Tibbling)	Referee: Morten Krogh

27 October 2021	FC Nordsjælland (1)	1–4 (a.e.t.)	OB (1)	Right to Dream Park
18:00	Antman 13' (Christensen); Frese (yellow card) 16'; Nagalo (yellow card) 32' (yellow-red card) 35'; Coulibaly (yellow card) 88'; Ogura (yellow card) 90+2'	Report	Frøkjær-Jensen (yellow card) 29'; Kløve (yellow card) 70'; Þrándarson 89' (Opondo); Lieder 89' (Þrándarson) 113'; Sabbi 102' (Tverskov)	Referee: Jakob A. Sundberg

27 October 2021	AGF (1)	0–2 (a.e.t.)	SønderjyskE (1)	Ceres Park & Arena
19:45	Bundu (yellow card) 52'; Hausner (yellow card) 89'; Kurminowski (yellow card) 101'	Report	Taiwo (yellow card) 88'; Kristinsson 94' (Albæk) 108'; Prosser (yellow card) 119'	Referee: Aydin Uslu

28 October 2021	Aalborg Freja (8)	0–3	Brøndby IF (1)	Aalborg Portland Park
18:00	Vingaard (yellow card) 20'	Report	Pavlović 16' (Riveros); Singh 52' (Børkeeiet); Fallenius 65' (Greve)	Referee: Mikkel Redder

28 October 2021	FC Midtjylland (1)	3–1 (a.e.t.)	AaB (1)	MCH Arena
19:45	Sisto (yellow card) 45+3'; Andersson 56' (Sisto); Lössl (yellow card) 90+2'; Evander 102' (Sisto); Isaksen (yellow card) 111'	FCM Summary	Ross (yellow card) 45+3'; Højholt (yellow card) 45+4'; Prip 90+3'; Thelander (yellow card) 118'	Referee: Peter Kjærsgaard-Andersen

== Quarter-finals ==
4 December 2021	Vejle (1)	5–1	Kolding IF (3)	Vejle Stadium, Vejle
18:00 CET

11 December 2021	Kolding IF (3)	2–1 (3–6 agg.)	Vejle (1)	Autocentralen Park, Kolding
18:00 CET

5 December 2021	SønderjyskE (1)	1–0	Hvidovre IF (2)	Sydbank Park, Haderslev
18:00 CET

10 December 2021	Hvidovre IF (2)	3–2 (a.e.t.) (3–3 agg.) (3–4 p)	SønderjyskE (1)	Hvidovre Stadion, Copenhagen
18:00 CET

5 December 2021	Randers FC (1)	0–2	OB (1)	Cepheus Park Randers, Randers
18:00 CET

12 December 2021	OB (1)	1–2 (3–2 agg.)	Randers FC (1)	Nature Energy Park, Odense
18:00 CET

5 December 2021	Brøndby IF (1)	0–2	FC Midtjylland (1)	Brøndbyvester
14:30 CET	Mensah (yellow card) 20'; Ben Slimane (yellow card) 27'	FCM Summary	Charles 22' (yellow card) 37'; Brumado 61' (Dyhr); Lind (yellow card) 88'	Stadium: Brøndby Stadium; Referee: Sandi Putros

12 December 2021	FC Midtjylland (1)	1–2 (3–2 agg.)	Brøndby IF (1)	MCH Arena, Herning
18:00 CET

== Semi-finals ==
27 April 2022	SønderjyskE (1)	1–2	OB (1)	Haderslev
18:00 CEST	Thomsen (yellow card) 46'; Christiansen 51' (Frederiksen); Sanneh (yellow card) 55'; Frederiksen (yellow card) 65'; Dal Hende (yellow card) 78'; Kornvig (yellow card) 90+3'; Hassan (yellow card) 90+5'	Report	Fenger 44' (yellow card) 48'; Ivančević (yellow card) 55'; Kløve 83' (Kadrii); Sabbi (yellow card) 90+4'	Stadium: Sydbank Park; Attendance: 3,772; Referee: Jorgen Daugbjerg Burchardt

5 May 2022	OB (1)	3–0 (5–1 agg.)	SønderjyskE (1)	Odense
18:00 CEST	Jebali 2'; Sabbi 22' (Frøkjær-Jensen); Frøkjær-Jensen 45' (Svendsen)	Report		Stadium: Nature Energy Park; Referee: Morten Krogh

28 April 2022	Vejle (1)	0–1	Midtjylland (1)	Vejle
18:30 CEST	Ofori (yellow card) 45+2'; Kolinger (yellow card) 56'; Provstgaard (yellow card) 62'; Drammeh (yellow card) 80'; Albornoz (yellow card) 86'	FCM Summary	Høegh (yellow card) 29'; Dreyer 68' (Sisto); Thychosen (yellow card) 84'	Stadium: Vejle Stadium; Attendance: 6,000; Referee: Michael Tykgaard

4 May 2022	FC Midtjylland (1)	3–1 (4–1 agg.)	Vejle (1)	Herning
18:00 CEST	Brumado 42' (Meyer); Dreyer 73' (Andersson); Sviatchenko 80' (Andersson)	Report	Albentosa 22' (Muçolli); Emmanouilidis (yellow card) 49'; Okoku (yellow card) 60'	Stadium: MCH Arena; Referee: Jens Maae

== Final ==
26 May 2022
15:00

OB (1)	0–0 (a.e.t.)	Midtjylland (1)
Ivančević (yellow card) 48'	Report	Onyedika (yellow card) 67'; Thychosen (yellow card) 72'; Dreyer (yellow card) 105+3'
Penalties
Thomasen (penalty scored); Okosun (penalty missed); Jebali (penalty scored); Kadrii (penalty scored); Larsen (penalty missed)	3–4	(penalty scored) Dreyer; (penalty missed) Sviatchenko; (penalty scored) Sisto; (penalty scored) Onyedika; (penalty scored) Evander

Brøndby Stadium, Brøndbyvester
Attendance: 23,328
Referee: Sandi Putros
