= 2020–21 Danish Cup =

DBU Pokalen (The DBU Cup)
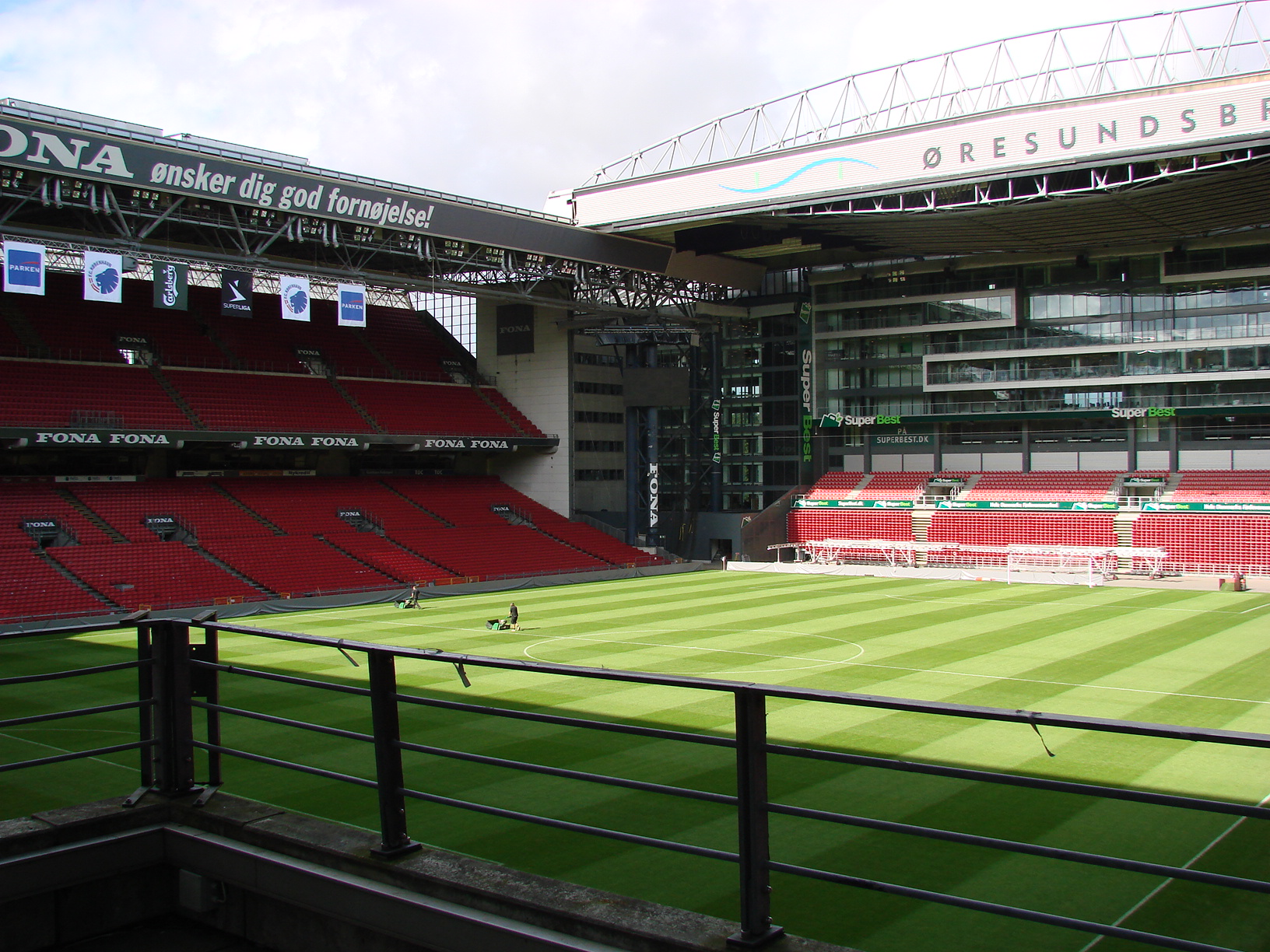
- Parken Stadium hosted the final

Tournament details
- Country: Denmark
- Teams: 104

Final positions
- Champions: Randers (2nd title)
- Runners-up: SønderjyskE

The 2020–21 Danish Cup, also known as Sydbank Pokalen, was the 67th season of the Danish Cup competition.

Randers defeated SønderjyskE in the final of the competition on 13 May 2021. As the winner of the tournament, Randers earned qualification into the play-off round of the 2021–22 UEFA Europa League.

== Structure ==
Assuming a similar structure to 2019–20, 92 teams are expected to participate in the first round, coming from all levels of competition. Six additional teams joined in the second round, while the top six teams from the 2019–20 Danish Superliga entered in the third round.

== Notable Dates ==
The draw date and matchdays for the 2020–21 Sydbank Pokalen are as follows:
First round – 1-3 September 2020
Second round – 6-8 October 2020
Third round – 10-12 November 2020
Fourth round – 15-17 December 2020
Quarter-finals – 9-11 February 2021
Semi-finals – 14-15 April 2021
Final – 13 May 2021

== Participants ==
104 teams will compete for the Danish Cup. All teams from the top three divisions in 2019–20 were automatically entered, while 54 teams from lower division teams qualified through qualifying matches to enter the competition proper.

== First round ==
In the first round of the tournament, all teams except those from the 2020–21 Danish Superliga participated, meaning 92 teams took part in this round.

The draw was held on Friday, 2 July 2020.

1 September 2020	Glamsbjerg (5)	0–8	Esbjerg (2)	Glamsbjerg Stadion, Glamsbjerg
16:30		Report	Ankersen 17'; Egelund 28'; Tranberg 36'; Bjarnason 44', 51', 59'; Kristensen 57'; Yakovenko 80'

1 September 2020	Ringsted (5)	3–0	Vordingborg (2)	Ringsted Stadion, Ringsted
17:00	Mikkelsen 2', 75'; Larsen 44'	Report

1 September 2020	Frederikssund (5)	1–4	Næstved (3)	Frederikssund Stadion, Frederikssund
17:00	Helev 10'	Report	Schmitt 15'; Hassan 36' (pen.), 90+3'; Thrane 79'

1 September 2020	Ishøj (5)	1–2 (a.e.t.)	AB (3)	Ishøj Idrætscenter, Ishøj
17:00	Offenberg 90+3' (pen.)	Report	Mygind 35'; Christensen 100'

1 September 2020	Vanløse (3)	1–2 (a.e.t.)	Hillerød (3)	Vanløse Idrætspark, Vanløse
17:00	Jung 20'	Report	Olsen 42'; Bennett-Larsen 99'

1 September 2020	B.1908 (4)	1–3	Fremad Amager (2)	Sundby Idrætspark, Copenhagen
17:00	Larsen 90'	Report	Olusegun 9', 39', 69'

1 September 2020	Sydvest (3)	2–0	Fredericia (2)	BankParken, Tønder
17:00	Easter 25'; Egelund 65'	Report

1 September 2020	Aalborg Freja (4)	0–4	VSK Aarhus (3)	Frejaparken, Aalborg
17:00		Report	Msabaha 31'; Fæster 43'; Habibi 61'; Spornberger 90+2'

1 September 2020	Brønderslev (4)	0–4	Brabrand (3)	Arena Kop & Kande, Brønderslev
17:00		Report	Poulsen 27'; Suner 34'; Kaljo 67', 75' (pen.)

1 September 2020	Skjold Birkerød (4)	1–0	Avedøre (3)	Birkerød Stadion, Birkerød
17:15	Willer 67'	Report

1 September 2020	Allerød (4)	3–1	BK Union (5)	Allerød Idrætspark, Allerød
17:15	Pitzner-Schmidt 11' (pen.), 80' (pen.); Møller 45' (o.g.)	Report	Vielsted 25'

1 September 2020	Utopia (6)	1–1 (a.e.t.) (6–5 p)	Bogense (5)	Munke Mose, Odense
17:15	Norlen 90' (pen.)	Report	Mørkhøj 90'
	Penalties
	Norlen (penalty scored); Johansen (penalty scored); Zada (penalty scored); Greve (penalty scored); Olsen (penalty missed); Nellerod Nordentoft (penalty scored); Lund-Sørensen (penalty scored)		(penalty scored) Møllegaard; (penalty missed) Knudsen; (penalty scored) Øxenberg Hansen; (penalty scored) Hansen; (penalty scored) Brunholt; (penalty scored) Obbekær

1 September 2020	NFB (5)	1–3	LSF (4)	KL Køleteknik Arena, Nørre Alslev
17:15	Faye 85'	Report	Rasmussen 1'; Lindbaum 29'; Soelberg 77'

1 September 2020	Egebjerg (9)	0–2	Kolding (2)	Ulbølle Stadion, Vester Skerninge
17:15		Report	Eriksen 37'; Nautrup 52'

1 September 2020	SGI (5)	0–1	Kolding Boldklub (4)	Guldager Idrætscenter, Esbjerg
17:15		Report	Rode 22'

1 September 2020	Højslev (5)	0–4	Viby (4)	Højslev Stadion, Højslev
17:15		Report	Lehmann 25'; Matras 60', 75'; Breindahl Krogh 61'

1 September 2020	Djursland (4)	0–7	Skive (2)	HSM Arena Grenaa, Grenaa
17:15		Report	Denius 1', 86' (pen.); Haurits 15', 55', 66'; Møberg 54'; Agger 90+1'

1 September 2020	Ringkøbing (4)	0–2	Vendsyssel (2)	Green Arena, Ringkøbing
17:15		Report	Messaoud; Plauborg Jensen (o.g.)

1 September 2020	Frem Sakskøbing (6)	1–6	Roskilde (3)	JP Air Tech Arena, Sakskøbing
17:15	Campara 70'	Report	Maarup 58'; Kannah 67', 86'; Rajovic 80', 90'; Djafer-Bey 89'

1 September 2020	Morsø (5)	0–9	Viborg (2)	Morsø Multipark, Nykøbing Mors
18:30		Report	S. Grønning 20', 36'; Sørensen 32'; Bakiz 38'; Achelus 55'; Jatta 63', 75'; Lauritsen 72'; Gandrup 85'

1 September 2020	BK Skjold (5)	1–1 (a.e.t.) (5–6 p)	KFUM København (5)	Fælledparken Kunst, Copenhagen
19:00	Tindbæk 7'	Report	Vangsted Larsen 53'
	Penalties
	Tindbæk (penalty scored); Nordgard (penalty scored); Kold (penalty scored); Tyrki (penalty scored); Zekiri (penalty scored)		(penalty scored) M. Petersen; (penalty scored) S. Pedersen; (penalty scored) Hansen; (penalty scored) Boch; (penalty scored) Barad; (penalty scored) Helge

1 September 2020	Nakskov (5)	0–3	Nykøbing (3)	OK Plus Stadion, Nakskov
19:30		Report	Kristensen 25'; Koch 58', 60'

1 September 2020	Skovshoved (3)	0–0 (a.e.t.) (5–4 p)	Hellerup (3)	Gentofte Sportspark, Gentofte
20:00		Report
	Penalties
	unknown player (penalty scored); Petersen (penalty scored); Arndal-Lauritzen (penalty scored); Antipas (penalty missed); Junge (penalty scored); Madsen (penalty scored)		(penalty scored) Krabbe; (penalty scored) Angus; (penalty missed) Thorup Børner; (penalty scored) Christiansen; (penalty scored) Jensen; (penalty missed) Salech

1 September 2020	GVI (4)	1–2 (a.e.t.)	Avarta (3)	GVI Kunststofbane, Gentofte
20:00	Veltz 66'	Report	Guldbrandsen 90' unknown player 118' (o.g.)

1 September 2020	Brønshøj (3)	2–1	Frem (3)	Tingbjerg Idrætspark, Brønshøj
20:00	Lazarevic 90+1' (pen.), 90+5' (pen.)	Report	Aslani 8'

1 September 2020	ASA Aarhus (5)	4–0	Aalborg Chang (5)	Robotize Park, Aarhus
20:15	unknown player unknown player unknown player unknown player	Report

2 September 2020	Lyseng (4)	0–7	Hobro (2)	Lyseng Idrætspark, Højbjerg
17:30		Report	Enevoldsen 30', 43'; Don Deedson 39', 65'; Andersson 46'; Hvilsom 78'; Louati 90'

2 September 2020	Fjordager (5)	1–2	Hedensted (4)	Fjordager IF.s anlæg, Odense
	Pedersen 60'	Report	Christensen 8'; Suljic 90+5'

2 September 2020	Kjellerup (4)	3–0	Thisted (3)	XL-BYG ARENA, Kjellerup
	Andersen 15'; Hersbøll 43'; Petersen 66'	Report

2 September 2020	Bispebjerg (6)	3–2	Helsingør (2)	Lersøparken, Bispebjerg
	Ibdal 19'; Vestergaard 45'; Brandt Jensen 52'	Report	Bergqvist 18', 63'

2 September 2020	FC ESPM (7)	2–5	Solrød (5)	Art, Valby IP
	Christiansen 8' (o.g.); Bernasko-Appu 53'	Report	Lopez 18', 89', 90+2'; Dittler 24'; Lytsen 79' (pen.)

2 September 2020	Rødovre (6)	2–4	Græsrødderne (6)	Rødovre Stadium
	Knudsen 72' (pen.); James 87'	Report	Frederiksen 5'; Jensen 11' (o.g.); Pedersen 55'; Quarm 65'

2 September 2020	Rønne (5)	0–3	B 93 (3)	Rønne Stadium North, Rønne
		Report	unknown player unknown player unknown player

2 September 2020	Løjt (7)	0–2	Grindsted (7)	Løjt Idrætsanlæg
		Report	Jesper 82'; Raguleswaran 90+2'

2 September 2020	Otterup (4)	2–3	Middelfart (3)	Nordfyns Bank Arena, Otterup
	Lærche 30', 39'	Report	Høgh 44'; Schkolnik 62'; Villemoes 90'

2 September 2020	FIUK Odense (7)	0–7	Næsby (3)	Humlehaveskolen, Odense
		Report	Ørbech 28', 41', 61'; Lund Pedersen 30' (pen.); Hansen 71'; Petersen 75'; Birktoft 88'

2 September 2020	Glostrup (5)	0–2	Hvidovre (2)	Glostrup Idrætspark, Glostrup
		Report	Qamili 49'; Lindberg 85' (pen.)

2 September 2020	Skanderborg (5)	1–1 (a.e.t.) (3–5 p)	OKS (4)	team.blue arena, Skanderborg
	Heesch	Report	Mose-Johansen
	Penalties
	Vissing Hansen (penalty scored); Overbye (penalty scored); unknown player (penalty missed); unknown player (penalty missed)		(penalty scored) Grønholt; (penalty scored) Nielsen; (penalty scored) Ilsøe; (penalty scored) Jensen

2 September 2020	Helsted Fremad (5)	0–1	Holstebro (3)	Quickpoint Park Helsted Artificial turf pitch, Helstad
		Report	Zetterquist 68'

2 September 2020	Slagelse (3)	2–1	Dalum (3)	Slagelse Stadium, Slagelse
	Ahlgren 78' (pen.); Petersen 90+4' (pen.)	Report	Pedersen 70'

3 September 2020	St. Restrup (7)	0–5	Silkeborg (2)	Frejlev Stadium
		Report	Mattsson 9', 69'; Holten 15'; Lind 73', 81'

3 September 2020	Suså (6)	1–2	Holbæk (3)	Herlufmagle Artificial grass
	Rasmussen 20'	Report	Bengtsson 76'; Jensen 90+4'

8 September 2020	Hundested (5)	0–3	BSF (4)	Hundested Stadium
		Report	Ali 57', 68'; Brøns 70'

8 September 2020	Vejgaard (4)	0–2	Jammerbugt (3)	Soffy Road, Aalborg
18:00		Report	Lyngø 25'; Bytyqi 81'

8 September 2020	Vatanspor (5)	1–5	Aarhus Fremad (3)	Bøgeskov Idrætsanlæg, Fredericia
18:15	Warsame 76'	Report	Andreasen 40', 65'; Kirchheiner 70', 90'; Nissen 86'

23 September 2020	FA 2000 (4)	0–3	HB Køge (2)	Frederiksberg Idrætspark, Frederiksberg
		Report	Nsungusi 30', 34'; Kolind 78'

== Second round ==
The draw was held on 4 September 2020.

There were 52 teams:

- 46 teams from the 1st round (winners)
- 5 teams from the 2019–20 Danish Superliga (7th–11th placed)
- The 2019–20 Danish 1st Division champions

6 October 2020	Hedensted (4)	3–1 (a.e.t.)	Viborg (2)	Hedensted Stadion
	Gordinho 40' (o.g.); Suljic 106'; Rode 116'	Report	Jensen 96'

6 October 2020	Sydvest (3)	1–4	Randers (1)	BankParken, Tønder
	Clausen 44'	Report	Egho 17'; Kragh Nielsen 31'; Lauridsen 54'; Bassala Sambou 67'

6 October 2020	Ringsted (5)	2–3 (a.e.t.)	Avarta (3)	Ringsted Stadion, Ringsted
	Saber 44'; Larsen 98' (pen.)	Report	Pedersen 36', 104'; Thomsen 101'

6 October 2020	Kjellerup (4)	2–4	Brabrand (3)	XL-BYG ARENA, Kjellerup
	Pietras 51'; Grønne 72'	Report	Andersen 8', 18'; Boesen 70'; Søjberg 83'

6 October 2020	Solrød (5)	0–3	B 93 (3)	Solrød Idrætscenter
		Report	Dhaflaoui 4'; Fraysse 59'; Elsayed 86'

6 October 2020	Skjold Birkerød (4)	0–6	Nykøbing (3)	Birkerød Stadion, Birkerød
		Report	Nielsen 4'; Koch 11', 40'; Jensen 18'; Jessen 69'; Thorsheim 83'

6 October 2020	LSF (4)	2–1	Roskilde (3)	Smørum Idrætscenter
	Lindbaum 71'; Kjærsgaard 82' (pen.)	Report	Kannah 19'

6 October 2020	Bispebjerg (6)	0–4	HB Køge (2)	Lersøparken, Bispebjerg
		Report	Johansson 15', 27'; Romeo 44'; Nsungusi 60'

6 October 2020	Viby (4)	1–2	Skive (2)	Viby Idrætspark
	Backs 18'	Report	Møberg 73'; Fisker 77'

6 October 2020	Jammerbugt (3)	2–1	Middelfart (3)	Sparekassen Vendsyssel Arena
	Mortensen 69'; Bytyqi 88'	Report	Høgh 25'

7 October 2020	Allerød (4)	1–2 (a.e.t.)	AB (3)	Allerød Idrætspark, Allerød
	Petersen 101'	Report	Seeger-Hansen 94' (pen.); Kisum 109'

7 October 2020	Aarhus Fremad (3)	5–0	Vendsyssel (2)	Riisvangen Stadion
	Andreasen 42', 54'; Skjoldborg From 66'; Kirchheiner 69', 90+1'	Report

7 October 2020	Hillerød (3)	1–2	OB (1)	Hillerød Stadion
	Petersen 12'	Report	Thrándarson 26'; Jebali 30'

7 October 2020	Næsby (3)	0–3	Horsens (1)	ALPI Arena, Næsby
		Report	Finnbogason 32', 52'; Trenskow 84'

7 October 2020	Utopia (6)	0–5	Kolding (2)	Munke Mose
		Report	Kudsk; Nautrup; Sand; Zjajo

7 October 2020	OKS (4)	1–2	VSK Aarhus (3)	OKSON-Park
	Jensen 8'	Report	Balle 85', 90+2'

7 October 2020	Kolding Boldklub (4)	0–4	Holstebro (3)	Mosevej Sportsplads
		Report	Nielsen 8'; Iversen 19', 30'; Søvndahl 52'

7 October 2020	Grindsted (7)	1–2	ASA Aarhus (5)	Grindsted Stadion
	Raguleswaran 73' (pen.)	Report	Heesgaard 34'; Bundgaard 45'

7 October 2020	KFUM København (5)	0–2	Hvidovre (2)	Emdrupparken
		Report	Buch 64'; Vinterberg 89'

7 October 2020	Slagelse (3)	2–0	Skovshoved (3)	Slagelse Stadium, Slagelse
	Tangvig 76'; Lindh 90+1'	Report

7 October 2020	Brønshøj (3)	4–5 (a.e.t.)	Lyngby (1)	Tingbjerg Idrætspark, Brønshøj
	Tshiembe 11' (o.g.); Hemmingshøj 27'; With 87'; Guendouri 89'	Report	Nielsen 21', 95'; Rømer 34'; Overgaard 42'; Warming 48'

7 October 2020	Holbæk (3)	0–3	Fremad Amager (2)	Holbæk Sportsby, Holbæk
		Report	Iyede 47'; Tokú 83'; Olusegun 88'

7 October 2020	Hobro (2)	0–3	Vejle (1)	Hobro Stadium, Hobro
		Report	Montiel 26', 47'; Dahl 67'

8 October 2020	Græsrødderne (6)	1–5	Nordsjælland (1)	Gentofte Sportspark
	Pedersen	Report	Nnamani; Jensen; Antman; Rothmann; Atanga

8 October 2020	Esbjerg (2)	2–1	Silkeborg (2)	Esbjerg Stadium, Esbjerg
	Ankersen 42'; Bjarnason 78'	Report	Mattsson 15'

13 October 2020	BSF (4)	0–0 (a.e.t.) (4–3 p)	Næstved (3)	Ballerup Idrætspark
		Report
	Penalties
	Zederkopff (penalty scored); Tidemand (penalty scored); Stubberup (penalty missed); Brøns (penalty scored); Christensen (penalty scored)		(penalty scored) Schmitt; (penalty scored) Hassan; (penalty missed) Thrane; (penalty scored) Jotoba; (penalty missed) Todorovic

== Third round ==
The draw was held on 8 October 2020.

There were 32 teams:

- 26 teams from the 2nd round (winners)
- 6 teams from the 2019–20 Danish Superliga (1st–6th placed)

4 November 2020	Avarta (3)	1–2	Copenhagen (1)	Espelundens Idrætsanlæg, Rødovre
	Walter 5'	Report	Fischer 42', 59'

5 November 2020	LSF (4)	0–1	Brøndby (1)	Smørum Idrætscenter
		Report	Hedlund 40'

10 November 2020	Aarhus Fremad (3)	1–3	Randers (1)	Riisvangen Stadium, Aarhus N
	Ullum	Report	Sambou; Kristensen

10 November 2020	ASA Aarhus (5)	1–4	B 93 (3)	Robotize Park, Aarhus
	Egelind 44'	Report	Carrara 23', 59'; Elsayed 55', 82'

11 November 2020	BSF (4)	0–3	OB (1)	Ballerup Idrætspark
		Report	Tverskov 12'; Skjelvik 38'; Kløve 67'

11 November 2020	Hedensted (4)	1–5	Fremad Amager (2)	Hedensted Stadion
	Hyrm 55'	Report	Iyede 15'; Tokú 53'; Kubel 69' (o.g.)br>Munksgaard 75'br>Olusegun 83'

11 November 2020	Skive (2)	0–1	SønderjyskE (1)	Skive Stadium, Skive
		Report	Christiansen 2'

11 November 2020	HB Køge (2)	0–1	Midtjylland (1)	Køge Stadium, Køge
		Report	Høegh 21'

11 November 2020	AB (3)	1–2	AaB (1)	Gladsaxe Stadium, Gladsaxe
	Kisum 10'	Report	Okore 24'; Kusk 40'

11 November 2020	Brabrand (3)	2–2 (a.e.t.) (2–4 p)	Vejle (1)	Brabrand Stadion, Brabrand
	Søjberg 41', 81'	Report	Yamga 25', 90'
	Penalties
	Andersen (penalty scored); Boesen (penalty scored); Jørgensen (penalty missed); Søjberg] (penalty missed)		(penalty scored) Montiel; (penalty scored) Greve; (penalty scored) Milošević; (penalty scored) Yamga

11 November 2020	Slagelse (3)	0–9	Lyngby (1)	Slagelse Stadium, Slagelse
		Report	Gregor 4'; Torp 13', 39', 51'; Nielsen 20'; Drews 58' (o.g.); Geertsen 69'; Warming 80'; Jakobsen 86'

11 November 2020	VSK Aarhus (3)	2–4	Horsens (1)	Vejlby Stadium, Risskov
	Habibi 4'; Mogensen 51'	Report	Lange 29'; Tengstedt 47' (pen.), 55' (pen.); Gemmer 72'

11 November 2020	Nykøbing (3)	1–0	Esbjerg (2)	Nykøbing Falster Idrætspark, Nykøbing Falster
	Koch 66'	Report

12 November 2020	Kolding (2)	3–3 (a.e.t.) (3–4 p)	AGF (1)	Kolding Stadium, Kolding
	Hansen 4'; Grabara 8' (o.g.); Jakobsen 63'	Report	Juelsgård 43'; Helenius 46'; Mortensen 57'
	Penalties
	Nautrup (penalty missed); Gudmann (penalty scored); Eriksen (penalty scored); Bonde (penalty scored); Sommer (penalty missed)		(penalty scored) Mortensen; (penalty scored) Olsen; (penalty missed) Poulsen; (penalty scored) Hvidt; (penalty scored) Tingager

12 November 2020	Hvidovre (2)	2–0	Nordsjælland (1)	Hvidovre Stadium, Hvidovre
	Christensen 5'; Thomsen 12'	Report

2 December 2020	Jammerbugt (3)	3–4	Holstebro (3)	Kunstgræsbanen Jetsmark
	Ahlmann; Gavranovic; Møller	Report	Strangholt; Kiilerich; Lilbæk; Iversen

== Fourth round ==
The draw was held on 12 November 2020.

8 December 2020	B 93 (3)	1–0	AaB (1)	Right to Dream Park, Farum
	Bany 30'	Report

9 December 2020	Nykøbing (3)	0–3	OB (1)	Nykøbing Falster Idrætspark, Nykøbing Falster
		Report	Guðjohnsen 36'; Sabbi 39'; Hyllegaard 90+1'

15 December 2020	Hvidovre (2)	2–3	Vejle (1)	Hvidovre Stadium, Hvidovre
	Westergaard 15'; Thomsen 88'	Report	Henrique 56'; Montiel 61'; Dahl 65'

15 December 2020	Holstebro (3)	1–3	Randers (1)	Holstebro Idrætspark, Holstebro
	Lauridsen 88'	Report	Nielsen 44'; Kamara 56'; Klysner 81'

16 December 2020	SønderjyskE (1)	2–1 (a.e.t.)	Lyngby (1)	Haderslev Football Stadium, Haderslev
	Wright 40'; Gartenmann 114'	Report	Torp 33'

16 December 2020	AGF (1)	1–0	Horsens (1)	Aarhus Stadium, Aarhus
	Tingager 87'	Report

17 December 2020	Fremad Amager (2)	2–1 (a.e.t.)	Brøndby (1)	Sundby Idrætspark, Amager Vest
	Toku 26'; Iyede 94'	Report	Uhre 45'

17 December 2020	Copenhagen (1)	1–1 (a.e.t.) (5–6 p)	Midtjylland (1)	Parken Stadium, Copenhagen
	Stage 9'	Report	Kaba 3'
	Penalties
	Wilczek (penalty scored); Biel (penalty scored); Ankersen (penalty scored); Boilesen (penalty scored); Oviedo (penalty scored); Thomsen (penalty missed)		(penalty scored) Mabil; (penalty scored) Dreyer; (penalty scored) Andersson; (penalty scored) Sviatchenko; (penalty scored) Evander; (penalty scored) Paulinho

== Quarter-finals ==
The draw was held on 17 December 2020. Contrary to previous years, the quarter-finals were played over two legs.

10 February 2021	AGF (1)	3–1	B 93 (3)	Aarhus Stadium, Aarhus
20:15 CET	Mortensen (yellow card) 24'; Þorsteinsson 39'; Gersbach 49'; Links 79'	Report	Hegaard (yellow card) 80'; Stückler 90+3'	Referee: Jørgen Daugbjerg Burchardt

11 March 2021	B 93 (3)	2–1 (3–4 agg.)	AGF (1)	Østerbro Stadium, Copenhagen
18:45 CET	Erenbjerg 5'; Lund 90+2'	Report	Diks 80'	Referee: Sandi Putros

10 February 2021	Fremad Amager (2)	1–2	SønderjyskE (1)	Sundby Idrætspark, Copenhagen
18:00 CET	Soulas 65'	Report	Finne 37'; Ekani 83'	Referee: Jens Maae

11 March 2021	SønderjyskE (1)	4–1 (6–2 agg.)	Fremad Amager (2)	Haderslev Football Stadium, Haderslev
16:30 CET	Wright 13'; Holm 38', 56'; Frederiksen 89'	Report	Bay 48' (pen.)	Referee: Peter Kjærsgaard

11 February 2021	Vejle (1)	0–0	Randers (1)	Vejle Stadium, Vejle
20:15 CET		Report		Referee: Morten Krogh

10 March 2021	Randers (1)	3–1 (3–1 agg.)	Vejle (1)	Randers Stadium, Randers
18:00 CET	Egho 13', 38'; Mileusnic 45+1'	Report	Engel 10'	Referee: Jens Maae

11 February 2021	OB (1)	1–2	Midtjylland (1)	Odense Stadium, Odense
18:00 CET	Opondo 32'	Report	Pfeiffer 39'; Isaksen 50'	Referee: Sandi Putros

10 March 2021	Midtjylland (1)	3–0 (5–1 agg.)	OB (1)	MCH Arena, Herning
16:30 CET	Sery 45'; Isaksen 49'; Vibe 75'	Report		Referee: Jørgen Daugbjerg Burchardt

== Semi-finals ==
The draw was held on 11 March 2021. Contrary to previous years, the semi-finals will be played over two legs.

8 April 2021	Midtjylland (1)	1–0	SønderjyskE (1)	MCH Arena, Herning
16:30 CEST	Kaba 48'	Report	Vinderslev (yellow card) 34'; Holm (yellow card) 69'	Attendance: 0 Referee: Jens Maae

15 April 2021	SønderjyskE (1)	3–1 (3–2 agg.)	Midtjylland (1)	Sydbank Park, Haderslev
16:30 CEST	Simonsen 49', 83'; Scholz 55' (o.g.); Banggaard (yellow card) 75'; Eskesen (yellow card) 88'	Report	Scholz (yellow card) 4'; Evander 87'	Attendance: 0 Referee: Jakob Kehlet

8 April 2021	AGF (1)	0–2	Randers (1)	Ceres Park, Aarhus
19:00 CEST	Hausner (yellow card) 70'	Report	Hammershøy-Mistrati 66'; Egho 71' (pen.)	Attendance: 0 Referee: Michael Tykgaard

15 April 2021	Randers (1)	1–1 (3–1 agg.)	AGF (1)	Cepheus Park, Randers
19:00 CEST	Egho 41'; Marxen (yellow card) 90+2'	Report	Mortensen 24'; Links (yellow card) 54'	Attendance: 0 Referee: Mads-Kristoffer Kristoffersen

== Final ==
13 May 2021
15:00

Randers FC (1)	4–0	SønderjyskE (1)
Marxen 2'; Greve 7', 81'; Piesinger 52'; Kallesøe (yellow card) 71'		Eskesen (yellow card) 19'; Albæk (yellow card) 83'; Dal Hende (yellow card) 86'

Ceres Park, Aarhus
Attendance: 7,981
Referee: Morten Krogh
