= List of Danish football transfers summer 2021 =

This is a list of Danish football transfers for the 2021 summer transfer window. Only moves featuring at least one Danish Superliga club are listed.

The winter transfer window opened on 15 June 2021. The window closed at midnight on 31 August 2021.

== Danish Superliga ==
=== AaB ===
In: Note: Flags indicate national team as defined under FIFA eligibility rules; some limited exceptions apply. Players may hold more than one non-FIFA nationality.

No.	Pos.	Nation	Player
7	FW	MKD	Aleksandar Trajkovski (on loan from (Spain) Mallorca)
9	FW	SRB	Milan Makarić (from (Serbia) Radnik Surdulica)
15	DF	DEN	Anders Hagelskjær (from Silkeborg)
18	MF	DEN	Louka Prip (from Horsens)

Out: Note: Flags indicate national team as defined under FIFA eligibility rules; some limited exceptions apply. Players may hold more than one non-FIFA nationality.

No.	Pos.	Nation	Player
7	MF	SWE	Oscar Hiljemark (retired)
9	FW	NED	Tom van Weert (to (Greece) Volos)
15	DF	DEN	Lukas Klitten (to (Italy) Frosinone)
18	MF	NOR	Martin Samuelsen (loan return to (England) Hull City)
19	FW	FRA	Timothé Nkada (loan return to (France) Reims, later loaned to (France) Orléans)
20	MF	DEN	Oliver Klitten (on loan to Hobro)
23	MF	UGA	Robert Kakeeto (on loan to Skive)
28	MF	DEN	Jeppe Pedersen (on loan to Vendsyssel)
29	FW	DEN	Oliver Børsting (on loan to Skive)

=== AGF ===
In: Note: Flags indicate national team as defined under FIFA eligibility rules; some limited exceptions apply. Players may hold more than one non-FIFA nationality.

No.	Pos.	Nation	Player
1	GK	DEN	Jesper Hansen (from Midtjylland)
4	DF	GER	Yann Aurel Bisseck (on loan from (Germany) 1. FC Köln, previously on loan at (Portugal) Vitória Guimarães B)
7	FW	SLE	Mustapha Bundu (on loan from (Belgium) Anderlecht, previously on loan at Copenhagen)
8	MF	ISL	Mikael Anderson (from Midtjylland)
15	DF	DEN	Oliver Lund (from OB)
19	DF	SWE	Eric Kahl (from (Sweden) AIK)
21	FW	POL	Dawid Kurminowski (from (Slovakia) Žilina)
25	DF	DEN	Mikkel Lassen (loan return from Skive)
26	DF	BEL	Anthony D'Alberto (from (Portugal) Moreirense)
33	MF	DEN	Frederik Brandhof (from Viborg)

Out: Note: Flags indicate national team as defined under FIFA eligibility rules; some limited exceptions apply. Players may hold more than one non-FIFA nationality.

No.	Pos.	Nation	Player
2	DF	AUS	Alex Gersbach (to (France) Grenoble)
7	MF	SRB	Milan Jevtović (to (Norway) Odd)
14	FW	DEN	Søren Tengstedt (to Silkeborg)
16	DF	DEN	Casper Højer Nielsen (to (Czech Republic) Sparta Prague)
19	MF	AUS	Daniel Arzani (loan return to (England) Manchester City)
23	FW	DEN	Mathias Jørgensen (loan return to (United States) New York Red Bulls)
25	DF	DEN	Mikkel Lassen (on loan to Horsens)
29	MF	DEN	Bror Blume (to (Austria) WSG Tirol)
34	DF	NED	Kevin Diks (loan return to (Italy) Fiorentina, later sold Copenhagen)
73	GK	POL	Kamil Grabara (loan return to (England) Liverpool, later sold to Copenhagen)

=== Brøndby ===
In: Note: Flags indicate national team as defined under FIFA eligibility rules; some limited exceptions apply. Players may hold more than one non-FIFA nationality.

No.	Pos.	Nation	Player
3	DF	NOR	Henrik Heggheim (from (Norway) Viking)
8	MF	DEN	Mathias Greve (from Randers)
16	GK	DEN	Thomas Mikkelsen (from Lyngby)
18	DF	DEN	Kevin Tshiembe (from Lyngby)
21	DF	SWE	Rasmus Wikström (from (Sweden) Göteborg)
24	FW	CRO	Marko Divković (on loan from (Slovakia) DAC 1904)
38	FW	DEN	Yousef Salech (from HIK)

Out: Note: Flags indicate national team as defined under FIFA eligibility rules; some limited exceptions apply. Players may hold more than one non-FIFA nationality.

No.	Pos.	Nation	Player
1	GK	GER	Marvin Schwäbe (to (Germany) 1. FC Köln)
3	DF	GER	Anthony Jung (to (Germany) Werder Bremen)
6	DF	ISL	Hjörtur Hermannsson (to (Italy) Pisa)
7	MF	DEN	Rezan Corlu (to Lyngby)
18	MF	DEN	Jesper Lindstrøm (to (Germany) Eintracht Frankfurt)
21	MF	DEN	Lasse Vigen Christensen (to (Belgium) Zulte Waregem)
24	DF	DEN	Joel Kabongo (to Randers)

=== Copenhagen ===
In: Note: Flags indicate national team as defined under FIFA eligibility rules; some limited exceptions apply. Players may hold more than one non-FIFA nationality.

No.	Pos.	Nation	Player
1	GK	POL	Kamil Grabara (from (England) Liverpool, previously on loan at AGF)
2	DF	NED	Kevin Diks (from (Italy) Fiorentina, previously on loan at AGF)
4	DF	NOR	Ruben Gabrielsen (on loan from (France) Toulouse)
5	DF	GEO	Davit Khocholava (from (Ukraine) Shakhtar Donetsk)
7	FW	RSA	Luther Singh (from (Portugal) Braga, previously on loan at (Portugal) Paços de Ferreira)
8	MF	ISL	Ísak Bergmann Jóhannesson (from (Sweden) Norrköping)
18	MF	ISL	Andri Baldursson (on loan from (Italy) Bologna)
31	GK	SWE	Johan Guadagno (from (England) Manchester United)

Out: Note: Flags indicate national team as defined under FIFA eligibility rules; some limited exceptions apply. Players may hold more than one non-FIFA nationality.

No.	Pos.	Nation	Player
1	GK	DEN	Stephan Andersen (released)
4	DF	DEN	Victor Nelsson (to (Turkey) Galatasaray)
5	DF	DEN	Andreas Bjelland (on loan to Lyngby)
7	MF	DEN	Viktor Fischer (to (Belgium) Royal Antwerp)
8	MF	DEN	Nicolaj Thomsen (to (Norway) Vålerenga)
11	FW	DEN	Mohamed Daramy (to (Netherlands) Ajax)
13	GK	NOR	Sten Grytebust (on loan to Vejle)
17	DF	CRO	Karlo Bartolec (to (Croatia) Osijek)
28	FW	SLE	Mustapha Bundu (loan return to (Belgium) Anderlecht, later loaned to AGF)
29	FW	DEN	Mikkel Kaufmann (on loan to (Germany) Hamburger SV)
—	DF	CZE	Michael Lüftner (to (Hungary) Fehérvár, previously on loan at (Cyprus) Omonia)
—	DF	URU	Guillermo Varela (to (Russia) Dynamo Moscow, previously on loan)

=== Midtjylland ===
In: Note: Flags indicate national team as defined under FIFA eligibility rules; some limited exceptions apply. Players may hold more than one non-FIFA nationality.

No.	Pos.	Nation	Player
14	DF	DEN	Henrik Dalsgaard (from (England) Brentford)
30	GK	NIR	Jared Thompson (from (England) Brentford)
35	MF	BRA	Charles (from (Brazil) Ceará)
38	FW	BRA	Marrony (from (Brazil) Atlético Mineiro)
73	DF	BRA	Juninho (from (Brazil) Palmeiras, previously on loan at (Brazil) Bahia)
—	FW	DEN	Sebastian Buch Jensen (loan return from (Norway) Start)

Out: Note: Flags indicate national team as defined under FIFA eligibility rules; some limited exceptions apply. Players may hold more than one non-FIFA nationality.

No.	Pos.	Nation	Player
1	GK	DEN	Jesper Hansen (to AGF)
9	FW	GUI	Sory Kaba (on loan to (Belgium) OH Leuven)
14	DF	DEN	Alexander Scholz (to (Japan) Urawa Red Diamonds)
17	DF	DEN	Ailton (released)
18	DF	DEN	Kristian Riis (to Lyngby)
26	FW	DEN	Lasse Vibe (released)
27	DF	DEN	Oliver Olsen (on loan to Fredericia)
30	GK	DEN	Oliver Ottesen (released)
31	GK	DEN	Mikkel Andersen (to (Norway) Brann)
33	FW	GER	Luca Pfeiffer (on loan to (Germany) Darmstadt 98)
34	MF	ISL	Mikael Anderson (to AGF)
36	MF	DEN	Anders Dreyer (to (Russia) Rubin Kazan)
38	MF	NGR	Frank Onyeka (to (England) Brentford)
39	MF	DEN	Victor Torp (on loan to (Belgium) KV Kortrijk)
43	MF	DEN	Nicolas Madsen (on loan to (Netherlands) Heerenveen)
46	DF	DEN	Japhet Sery Larsen (to (Norway) Brann)
—	DF	CAN	Manjrekar James (to Vejle, previously on loan at (Greece) Lamia)
—	DF	DEN	Rasmus Nicolaisen (to (France) Toulouse, previously on loan at (England) Portsmouth)
—	DF	DEN	Søren Reese (on loan to SønderjyskE, previously on loan at Horsens)
—	MF	DEN	Frederik Ørsøe Christensen (to Viborg)
—	MF	NGR	Babajide David (to (Turkey) Adana Demirspor, previously on loan at (Turkey) Hatayspor)
—	MF	DEN	Casper Tengstedt (to Horsens, previously on loan)
—	MF	DEN	Christian Tue Jensen (on loan to Fredericia, loan extension)
—	FW	NOR	Chuma Anene (to (Norway) Sandefjord)
—	FW	CRC	Mayron George (to (Switzerland) Lausanne-Sport, previously on loan at (France) Pau)

=== Nordsjælland ===
In: Note: Flags indicate national team as defined under FIFA eligibility rules; some limited exceptions apply. Players may hold more than one non-FIFA nationality.

No.	Pos.	Nation	Player
1	GK	GER	Eduardo dos Santos Haesler (on loan from (Germany) Werder Bremen)
29	FW	DEN	Joachim Rothmann (loan return from (Norway) Tromsø)

Out: Note: Flags indicate national team as defined under FIFA eligibility rules; some limited exceptions apply. Players may hold more than one non-FIFA nationality.

No.	Pos.	Nation	Player
1	GK	DEN	Peter Vindahl Jensen (to (Netherlands) AZ Alkmaar)
3	DF	NOR	Ulrik Yttergård Jenssen (released)
10	FW	GHA	Kamaldeen Sulemana (to (France) Rennes)
19	FW	DEN	Oliver Tølbøll Rimmen (on loan to Helsingør)
22	MF	DEN	Victor Jensen (loan return to (Netherlands) Ajax)
25	DF	SVK	Ivan Mesík (on loan to (Norway) Stabæk)
28	DF	SUI	Johan Djourou (released)
29	FW	DEN	Joachim Rothmann (on loan to (Norway) Tromsø, later loaned to Køge)
30	GK	SVK	Martin Vantruba (loan return to (Czech Republic) Slavia Prague)
—	DF	FIN	Tony Miettinen (to (Finland) KuPS)
—	MF	DEN	Christoffer Palm (to Fremad Amager)

=== OB ===
In: Note: Flags indicate national team as defined under FIFA eligibility rules; some limited exceptions apply. Players may hold more than one non-FIFA nationality.

No.	Pos.	Nation	Player
2	DF	NOR	Nico Mickelson (from (Norway) Strømsgodset)

Out: Note: Flags indicate national team as defined under FIFA eligibility rules; some limited exceptions apply. Players may hold more than one non-FIFA nationality.

No.	Pos.	Nation	Player
2	DF	DEN	Oliver Lund (to AGF)
8	MF	DEN	Janus Drachmann (to Horsens)
17	FW	ISL	Sveinn Aron Guðjohnsen (loan return to (Italy) Spezia)
18	FW	DEN	Rasmus Nisse (on loan to Kolding)
—	GK	DEN	Oliver Christensen (to (Germany) Hertha BSC)

=== Randers ===
In: Note: Flags indicate national team as defined under FIFA eligibility rules; some limited exceptions apply. Players may hold more than one non-FIFA nationality.

No.	Pos.	Nation	Player
4	DF	DEN	Joel Kabongo (from Brøndby)
9	MF	DEN	Jakob Ankersen (from Esbjerg)
30	MF	NGR	Vincent Onovo (from (Hungary) Újpest)
51	GK	DEN	Andreas Søndergaard (on loan from (England) Wolverhampton Wanderers)
90	FW	NGR	Stephen Odey (on loan from (Belgium) Genk)

Out: Note: Flags indicate national team as defined under FIFA eligibility rules; some limited exceptions apply. Players may hold more than one non-FIFA nationality.

No.	Pos.	Nation	Player
5	DF	DEN	Mathias Nielsen (to HB Køge)
23	FW	AUS	Nikola Mileusnic (to (Australia) Brisbane Roar)
42	FW	DEN	Kasper Høgh (to Hobro)
—	MF	DEN	Mathias Greve (to Brøndby)

=== Silkeborg ===
In: Note: Flags indicate national team as defined under FIFA eligibility rules; some limited exceptions apply. Players may hold more than one non-FIFA nationality.

No.	Pos.	Nation	Player
10	FW	DEN	Søren Tengstedt (from AGF)
22	MF	SWE	Robert Gojani (from (Sweden) Elfsborg)
28	DF	ARM	André Calisir (from (Greece) Apollon Smyrnis)
30	GK	DEN	Nicolai Larsen (from (France) EA Guingamp)

Out: Note: Flags indicate national team as defined under FIFA eligibility rules; some limited exceptions apply. Players may hold more than one non-FIFA nationality.

No.	Pos.	Nation	Player
10	MF	DEN	Magnus Mattsson (to (Netherlands) NEC)
11	FW	DEN	Emil Holten (to Esbjerg)
22	MF	ZAM	Valance Nambishi (to Fredericia)
24	DF	DEN	Jeppe Gertsen (to Fredericia)
25	DF	DEN	Anders Hagelskjær (to AaB)
—	GK	ISL	Patrik Gunnarsson (loan return to (England) Brentford)
—	FW	DEN	Wessam Abou Ali (to Vendsyssel)

=== SønderjyskE ===
In: Note: Flags indicate national team as defined under FIFA eligibility rules; some limited exceptions apply. Players may hold more than one non-FIFA nationality.

No.	Pos.	Nation	Player
3	DF	SWE	Emil Holm (on loan from (Italy) Spezia)
4	DF	CMR	Duplexe Tchamba (from (France) Strasbourg, previously on loan at (Norway) Strømsgodset)
6	DF	DEN	Søren Reese (on loan from Midtjylland, previously on loan at Horsens)
8	MF	DEN	Emil Kornvig (on loan from (Italy) Spezia)
9	FW	CMR	Faris Pemi Moumbagna (on loan from (Norway) Kristiansund)
12	DF	FRA	Maxime Soulas (from Fremad Amager)
14	FW	ISL	Kristófer Kristinsson (from (France) Grenoble, previously on loan at (Netherlands) Jong PSV)
17	MF	HUN	Dániel Prosser (on loan from (Hungary) MTK Budapest)
25	FW	NGR	Abdulrahman Taiwo (from (Slovakia) DAC 1904)
27	DF	NED	Robin Schouten (from (Netherlands) NAC Breda)

Out: Note: Flags indicate national team as defined under FIFA eligibility rules; some limited exceptions apply. Players may hold more than one non-FIFA nationality.

No.	Pos.	Nation	Player
3	DF	SWE	Emil Holm (to (Italy) Spezia)
4	DF	ISL	Ísak Ólafsson (to Esbjerg, previously on loan at (Iceland) Keflavík)
6	DF	AUT	Philipp Schmiedl (on loan to (Austria) Admira Wacker)
10	FW	DEN	Anders K. Jacobsen (to Horsens)
11	FW	NOR	Bård Finne (to (Norway) Brann)
12	DF	DEN	Pierre Kanstrup (on loan to Fremad Amager)
18	FW	BFA	Adama Guira (released)
20	FW	DEN	Peter Christiansen (on loan to Helsingør)
25	FW	USA	Haji Wright (on loan to (Turkey) Antalyaspor)
—	MF	DEN	Julius Beck (to (Italy) Spezia)

=== Vejle ===
In: Note: Flags indicate national team as defined under FIFA eligibility rules; some limited exceptions apply. Players may hold more than one non-FIFA nationality.

No.	Pos.	Nation	Player
2	DF	BRA	Heron (from (Brazil) Goiás)
4	DF	ENG	Jerome Opoku (on loan from (England) Fulham)
7	MF	FRA	Mouhamadou Drammeh (from (France) Reims)
9	FW	VEN	Andrés Ponce (from (Russia) Akhmat Grozny, previously on loan at (Russia) Rotor Volgograd)
13	GK	NOR	Sten Grytebust (on loan from Copenhagen)
15	DF	CAN	Manjrekar James (from Midtjylland, previously on loan at (Greece) Lamia)
16	MF	SWE	Kevin Čustović (from (Sweden) Västerås)
19	FW	MNE	Luka Đorđević (from (Russia) Lokomotiv Moscow, previously on loan at (Russia) Arsenal Tula)
21	GK	RUS	Aleksey Chernov (from (Russia) Ufa)
25	MF	ENG	Brandon Pierrick (from (England) Crystal Palace, previously on loan at (Scotland) Kilmarnock)
27	MF	GRE	Dimitrios Emmanouilidis (from (Greece) Panathinaikos, previously on loan at (Netherlands) Fortuna Sittard)
31	FW	BRA	Dominic Vinicius (from (China) Beijing BSU)
—	FW	RUS	German Onugkha (from (Russia) Krasnodar, previously on loan)

Out: Note: Flags indicate national team as defined under FIFA eligibility rules; some limited exceptions apply. Players may hold more than one non-FIFA nationality.

No.	Pos.	Nation	Player
4	DF	FIN	Juhani Ojala (to (Scotland) Motherwell)
15	DF	DEN	Mads Greve (to Vendsyssel)
16	MF	ALB	Ylber Ramadani (to (Hungary) MTK Budapest)
17	FW	DEN	Lukas Jensen (to Vendsyssel)
26	MF	DEN	Leonel Montaro (to Esbjerg)
—	GK	NED	Indy Groothuizen (to (Netherlands) Emmen)
—	DF	GUY	Matthew Briggs (to (England) Gosport Borough)
—	MF	DEN	Tobias Sommer (on loan to Kolding)
—	FW	DEN	Wahid Faghir (to (Germany) VfB Stuttgart)
—	FW	DEN	Adam Jakobsen (on loan to (Slovenia) Celje)
—	FW	RUS	German Onugkha (on loan to (Russia) Rubin Kazan, previously on loan at (Russia) Krylia Sovetov)

=== Viborg FF ===
In: Note: Flags indicate national team as defined under FIFA eligibility rules; some limited exceptions apply. Players may hold more than one non-FIFA nationality.

No.	Pos.	Nation	Player
8	MF	NED	Justin Lonwijk (from (Netherlands) Utrecht, previously on loan)
11	FW	NED	Jay-Roy Grot (from (Germany) VfL Osnabrück)
14	MF	NED	Clint Leemans (from (Netherlands) PEC Zwolle)
16	GK	DEN	Mikkel Andersen (from (Norway) Brann)
18	DF	NED	Kellian van der Kaap (from (Israel) Maccabi Netanya)
24	DF	DEN	Daniel Anyembe (from Esbjerg)
33	MF	DEN	Frederik Ørsøe Christensen (from Midtjylland)

Out: Note: Flags indicate national team as defined under FIFA eligibility rules; some limited exceptions apply. Players may hold more than one non-FIFA nationality.

No.	Pos.	Nation	Player
26	GK	DEN	Can Dursun (released)
—	DF	DEN	Alexander Fischer (released)
—	MF	DEN	Frederik Brandhof (to AGF)
—	MF	DEN	Emil Scheel (released)
—	FW	CIV	Serges Déblé (to (Armenia) Ararat Yerevan)
—	FW	GEO	Davit Skhirtladze (released)
