= Somalis in Denmark =

Total population
- 21,204

Regions with significant populations
- Copenhagen, Aarhus, Odense

Languages
- Somali · Danish · English

Religion
- Islam

Somalis in Denmark (Danish: Dansk-somaliere) are citizens and residents of Denmark who are of Somali descent.

By December 2018, nearly 1000 Somalis in Denmark lost their residence permits after the Danish Immigration Service started a review of the permits in 2017. The permits were revoked as parts of Somalia are safe enough for refugees to return.

== Demographics ==
Somali migrants and offspring in Denmark

Most Somalis in Denmark emigrated from Somalia following the start of the Somali Civil War (1986-), in the period between 1995 and 2000. According to Statistics Denmark, as of 2017, there are a total 21,204 persons of Somali origin living in Denmark. Of those individuals, 11,832 are Somalia-born immigrants and 9,372 are descendants of Somalia-born persons. 8,852 individuals are citizens of Somalia (4,730 men, 4,122 women).

As of 2016, a total of 148 Somalia-born persons have been granted residence permits in Denmark for family reunification, 63 for asylum, and 6 for other reasons. Somali residents are generally young, with most belonging to the 15–19 years (2,818 individuals), 10–14 years (2,704 individuals), 5–9 years (2,210 individuals) and 20–24 years (2,075 individuals) age groups.

== Socioeconomics ==
According to Statistics Denmark, as of 2016, among Somalia-born adults aged 30–59 in Denmark, around 66% of men and 79% of women live full-time in public housing units. This is because many arrived via family reunification or as refugees, and such immigrants usually settle in government-owned properties. Somalis primarily inhabit the regions of Hovedstaden (7,399), Midtjylland (6,471), Syddanmark (4,336), Nordjylland (1,576), and Sjælland (1,422), and the cities of Copenhagen (5,248), Aarhus (4,554), Odense (2,291), and Aalborg (1,289).

=== Income ===
According to Statistics Denmark, as of 2015, Somalia-born immigrants in Denmark have an average retirement income of less than 125,000 Danish krone. As of 2016, male immigrants from Somalia aged 20–59 have an annual income of DKK 200,000 before taxation. Most of that income comprises earned income, with the remainder consisting of public transfers, investment income and second income.

== Education ==
According to the Danish Institute for Local and Regional Government Research, in the 2012 Programme for International Student Assessment (PISA), Somali pupils constituted 6% of the student population in Denmark. They obtained PISA scores of 403 in mathematics (Matematik), 413 in reading (Læsning), 392 in science (Naturfag), and 382 in problem-solving (Problem-løsning). As of the 2015 PISA, Somali pupils represent 8% of Denmark's ethnic minority student population. The PISA scores are now generally in the medium range of the most frequent countries of origin for students.

== Notable individuals ==
- Mohamed Ali Yusuf, former Vice President of Puntland (1944–2024)
- Mona Tougaard, Danish fashion model (born 2002)
- Hamse Hussein, Danish footballer (born 2000)

== See also ==
- Islam in Denmark
