= Morten Krogh Hansen =

Danish football referee

Morten Krogh Hansen (Silkeborg, 19 March 1988) is a Danish football referee, who has been listed as a FIFA referee since 2019. Since 2023–24, he has been a member of UEFA's First Category of referees.

== Career ==
Krogh has officiated matches in the Danish Superliga since the 2016–17 season.

His first match in the top tier of Danish football was a game between Viborg FF and Esbjerg fB in July 2016. He officiated the final of 2020–21 Danish Cup, in which Randers FC defeated SønderjyskE Fodbold 4–0. Krogh has also officiated several matches at the Cypriot First Division.

In January 2019, he was included on the FIFA International Referees List, making him eligible to officiate international matches. His first appointment was on a UEFA European Under-17 Championship qualifying match between Belgium and Bosnia.

In June 2022, he officiated a UEFA Nations League match between the Georgia and Gibraltar. Later that year, he also officiated matches at the 2022 UEFA European Under-19 Championship, which was held in Slovakia.

Later, Krogh was appointed for the 2023 UEFA European Under-21 Championship, where he participated in three matches. In autumn 2023, he was among the referees selected for the 2023 FIFA U-17 World Cup, where he participated by officiating three matches.
