= Rasmus Nissen =

Rasmus Nissen may refer to:

- Rasmus Kristensen (Rasmus Nissen Kristensen, born 1997), Danish footballer
- Rasmus Nissen (footballer, born 2001), Danish footballer
- Rasmus Tønder Nissen (1822–1882), Norwegian, educator, theologian and politician
