= Pione Sisto =

Danish footballer (born 1995)

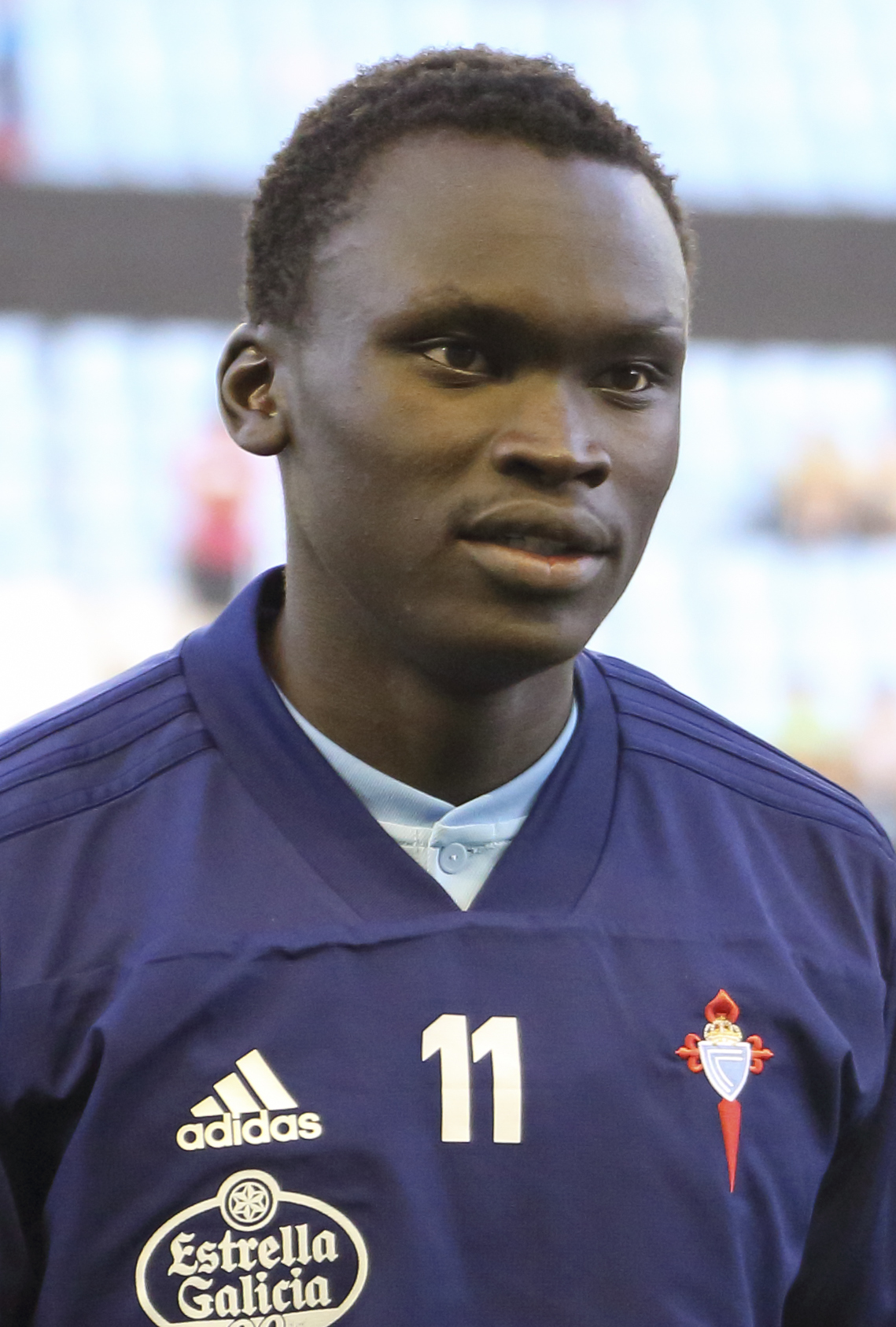
- Sisto with Celta in 2018

Personal information
- Full name: Pione Sisto Ifolo Emirmija
- Date of birth: 4 February 1995 (age 31)
- Place of birth: Kampala, Uganda
- Height: 1.71 m (5 ft 7 in)
- Position: Winger

Youth career
- 2002–2010: Tjørring
- 2010–2013: Midtjylland

Senior career*
Years	Team	Apps	(Gls)
2013–2016	Midtjylland	90	(20)
2016–2020	Celta Vigo	110	(12)
2020–2023	Midtjylland	66	(13)
2023–2024	Alanyaspor	20	(1)
2024–2026	Aris	26	(0)
2026	AEL	10	(0)

International career^{‡}
2015–2016	Denmark U21	6	(4)
2015–2021	Denmark	26	(1)
- * Club domestic league appearances and goals as of 16 June 2026 ‡ National team caps and goals as of 15 November 2021

Pione Sisto Ifolo Emirmija (Danish pronunciation: [pʰiˈoːnə ˈsisto]; born 4 February 1995) is a Danish professional footballer who plays as a left winger.

He began his professional career with Midtjylland of the Danish Superliga, making 114 total appearances and scoring 31 goals over five seasons. In 2016 he transferred to Celta Vigo for a €5 million fee, where he scored 18 goals in 135 games. In 2020, he returned to Midtjylland for €3 million.

Sisto made his senior debut for the Denmark national team in 2015, and was part of their squad for the 2018 FIFA World Cup.

== Club career ==
=== Early career ===
Pione Sisto was born in Kampala, Uganda, into a South Sudanese family. Sisto's family moved to Denmark when he was two months old. He was spotted by Tjørring IF in 2002, aged seven, and moved to FC Midtjylland’s youth setup in 2010.

=== Midtjylland ===
Sisto made his league debut during the 2012–13 Danish Superliga season and scored his first professional goal during the same season in the match against AGF. On 2 March 2014, he scored twice in FC Midtjylland's 5–1 away victory over Copenhagen in the Danish Superliga.

In December 2014, Sisto was voted "Player of the Year 2014" by the Danish Footballers' Association and "Profile of the Autumn 2014" by the Danish Football Magazine.

After an injury he played his first club match in 2015 in May coming on as a substitute against Copenhagen. Shortly after, he made an assist for the game's first goal followed by scoring the deciding goal, securing a 2–0 win for Midtjylland and their first Danish league title.

Scouts from Barcelona, Milan, and Juventus went to Denmark several times to see the Danish midfielder and Arsenal has also shown interest in the midfielder. According to Dutch newspaper De Telegraaf Ajax has offered €7 million without success.

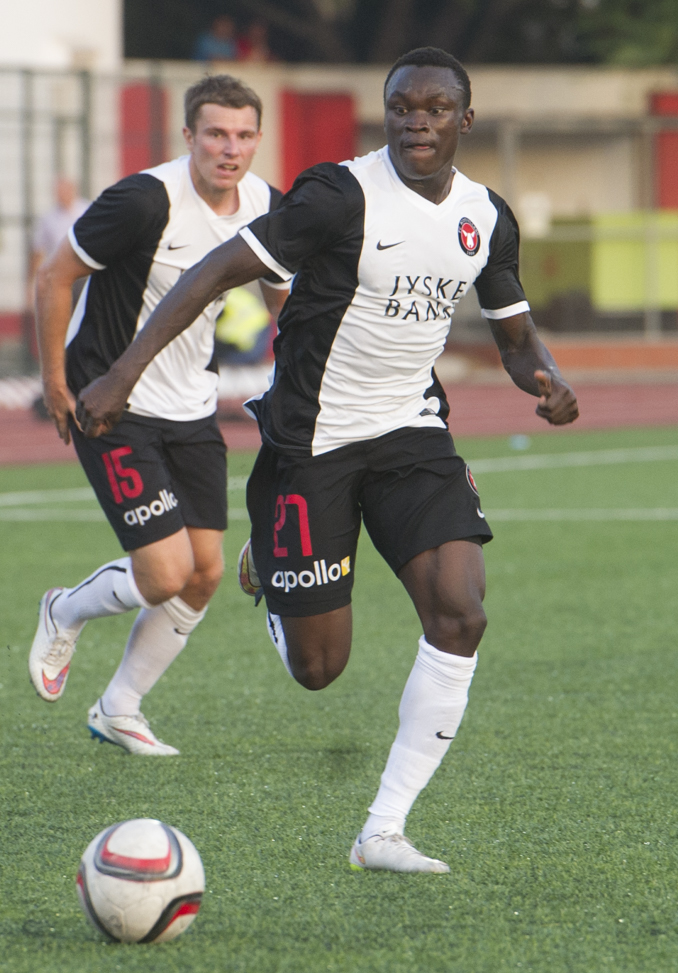
Sisto playing for Midtjylland in 2015

He scored for Midtjylland against Manchester United in a 2–1 home win in the Europa League on 18 February 2016. He also scored the opening goal of the second-leg at Old Trafford before Midtjylland went on to lose 5–1 (6–3 on aggregate) to United and bow out of the Europa League.

=== Celta ===
On 31 July 2016, La Liga club Celta de Vigo reached an agreement for the transfer of Sisto, for a fee rumoured to be €5 million. He signed a five-year deal.

He made his debut at the club on 22 August, starting in a 0–1 home loss against CD Leganés. On 25 September he scored for the first time in a 2–0 win at RCD Espanyol, running 80 metres from one penalty area to the other in the final minute. Also in his first season in Galicia, Sisto played 13 games and scored twice as the club reached the semi-finals of the UEFA Europa League for the first time. Both of his goals were in either leg of the 4–3 aggregate win over K.R.C. Genk in the quarter-finals in April 2017.

In May 2020, Sisto was fined a club record €60,000 by Celta for having driven 3,000 kilometres back to Denmark in March, during the COVID-19 pandemic.

=== Return to Midtjylland ===
On 7 September 2020, Midtjylland announced that they had signed Sisto on a four-year contract. The fee was reported as 22.5 million Danish krone, or around €3 million. The transfer became official after a lengthy dispute, where he almost joined the club's rivals, FC Copenhagen, whose offer was 4 million krone lower. Commenting on the transfer saga, Sisto stated that "It was my heart. My heart suddenly chose to go to FC Midtjylland. I found that it has always been my wish, but sometimes one gets tested." He also said that he was "a fan of intelligence" and that "there [would] always be pressure when you are Pione," referring to himself in third person. Sisto was assigned the number 7.

=== Alanyaspor ===
On 14 September 2023, Sisto signed for Turkish Süper Lig club Alanyaspor.

=== Aris ===
On 23 July 2024, Sisto signed for Greek Superleague club Aris.

== International career ==
Since Sisto was not a Danish citizen but had lived almost his whole life in Denmark, the Denmark national team manager Morten Olsen expressed his hope that the player would be eligible for the national squad. Upon receiving his Danish citizenship in December 2014, Sisto was immediately chosen to represent the Denmark national under-21 football team, although in an unofficial match. He was not yet able to represent Denmark in an official international match due to FIFA regulations. On 23 January 2015, he made his debut for the Danish U21 side, scoring a hat-trick in a 7–1 win against Romanian club FC Dinamo București.

On 8 May 2015, Sisto received official word of FIFA's dispensation decision, allowing him to represent Denmark without waiting the obligatory five years following his 18th birthday. Twelve days later, he was called up to the Denmark national football team for its matches against Montenegro and Serbia.

In June 2015, he represented the Denmark U21 team at the 2015 UEFA European Under-21 Championship in the Czech Republic, and scored the last goal in a 2–1 victory against the host nation in the opening match at the Eden Arena in Prague.

Sisto debuted for the Denmark national team on 4 September 2015, in a Euro 2016 qualifying match against Albania. He played the first 45 minutes of the goalless draw before being replaced at halftime by Yussuf Poulsen. He scored his first international goal on 22 March 2018, the only goal of a friendly win over Panama in Copenhagen.

In May 2018, Sisto was named in Denmark's preliminary 35-man squad for the 2018 World Cup in Russia. He was also named in the final 23-man team.

== Personal life ==
After the 2018 FIFA World Cup, Sisto proclaimed himself to be "the most hated person in Denmark" on social media, after having received criticism for his performances. His statements were met with surprise among Danish media.

In May 2019, Sisto confessed on social media that he had been on a 21-day diet consisting of only fruit. He stated that he "lost control" and that the "subsconscious is darkness".

In May 2020, Sisto revealed that he had suffered with bouts of depression which had begun during the 2018 FIFA World Cup. He also stated that he had been subject to racial abuse from parents of teammates during his time at the FC Midtjylland Academy in Ikast.

In July 2023, Sisto announced that he had purchased 4.3 hectares of land for the controversial Kingdom of Pineal in central Portugal, a micronation with elements of a cult, which was gaining national attention over the death of a young child in the community, raising doubts over its legality.

== Career statistics ==
=== Club ===
As of match played 10 May 2025

Appearances and goals by club, season and competition
Club	Season	League			Cup		Continental		Total	
Club	Season	Division	Apps	Goals	Apps	Goals	Apps	Goals	Apps	Goals
Midtjylland	2012–13	Danish Superliga	10	0	1	0	—		11	0
Midtjylland	2013–14	Danish Superliga	27	6	2	3	—		29	9
Midtjylland	2014–15	Danish Superliga	22	8	0	0	2 (Note: Appearance(s) in UEFA Europa League)	0	24	8
Midtjylland	2015–16	Danish Superliga	29	4	0	0	13 (Note: Four appearances in UEFA Champions League, nine appearances and four goals in UEFA Europa League)	4	42	8
Midtjylland	2016–17	Danish Superliga	2	2	0	0	5	4	7	6
Midtjylland	Total		90	20	3	3	20	8	113	31
Celta Vigo	2016–17	La Liga	30	3	6	1	13	2	49	6
Celta Vigo	2017–18	La Liga	34	5	2	1	—		36	6
Celta Vigo	2018–19	La Liga	25	2	2	0	—		27	2
Celta Vigo	2019–20	La Liga	21	2	2	2	—		23	4
Celta Vigo	Total		110	12	12	4	13	2	135	18
Midtjylland	2020–21	Danish Superliga	30	8	4	0	8 (Note: Appearance(s) in UEFA Champions League)	0	42	8
Midtjylland	2021–22	Danish Superliga	24	2	5	0	10 (Note: Two appearances in UEFA Champions League, two appearances in UEFA Europa League, six appearances in UEFA Europa Conference League)	0	39	2
Midtjylland	2022–23	Danish Superliga	12	3	0	0	8 (Note: Three appearances and two goals in UEFA Champions League, five appearances in UEFA Europa League)	2	20	5
Midtjylland	Total		66	13	9	0	26	2	101	15
Alanyaspor	2023-24	Süper Lig	20	1	3	1	—		23	2
Aris	2024-25	Superleague Greece	20	0	3	0	—		23	0
Career total			306	47	24	8	59	12	396	66

=== International ===
Statistics accurate as of match played 15 November 2021

Denmark
Year	Apps	Goals
2015	2	0
2016	2	0
2017	6	0
2018	11	1
2019	0	0
2020	4	0
Total	25	1

Scores and results list Denmark's goal tally first.

List of international goals scored by Pione Sisto
No.	Date	Venue	Opponent	Score	Result	Competition
1.	22 March 2018	Brøndby Stadium, Brøndbyvester, Denmark	Panama	1–0	1–0	Friendly

== Honours ==
Midtjylland

- Danish Superliga: 2014–15
- Danish Cup: 2021–22

Individual

- Danish Superliga Player of the Year: 2013–14
- Danish Superliga Player of "the Season": 2014–15 Autumn
