= Kingdom of Pineal =

Unrecognized micronation in Portugal

Kingdom of Pineal Kingdom of Pineal
- Micronation (unrecognized entity)
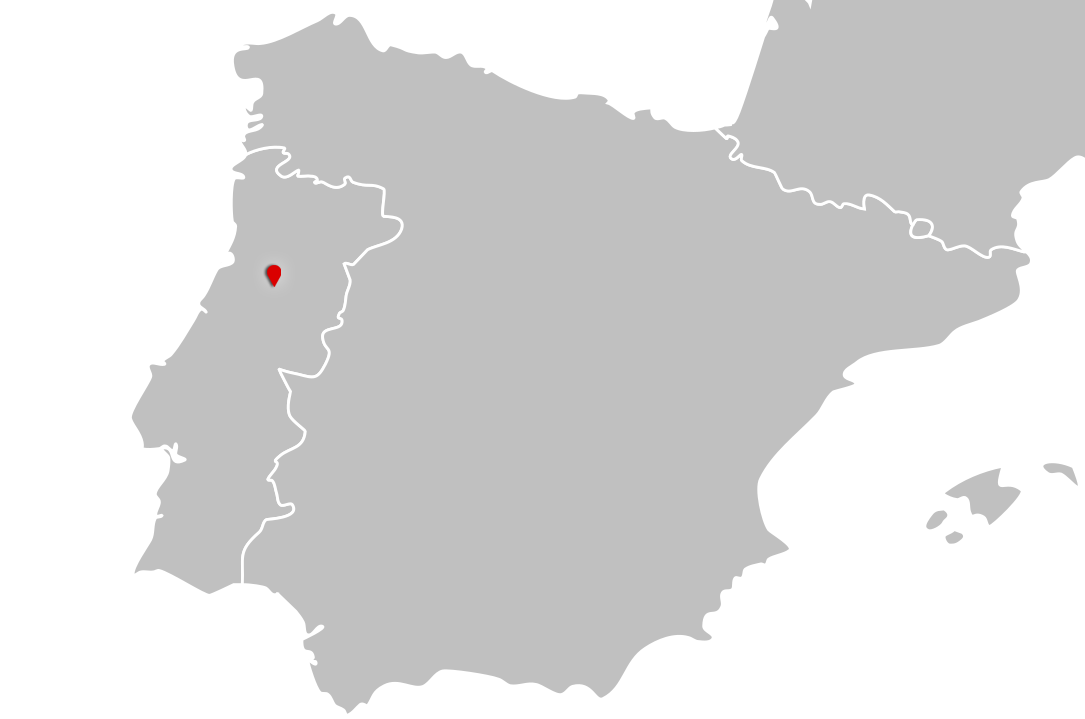
- Location of the Kingdom of Pineal
- Location: Inside Oliveira do Hospital, Coimbra District, Portugal
- Area claimed: 0.047 km²
- Number of residents: 4 (as of November 2023)
- Claimed by: Água Akbal Pinheiro
- Dates claimed: 2019 or 2020–present

The Kingdom of Pineal (Portuguese: Reino do Pineal) is a self-proclaimed independent kingdom located in the municipality of Oliveira do Hospital in central Portugal. Led by Zimbabwean-British Água Akbal Pinheiro, its independence is however not recognized by the Portuguese authorities, being legally represented by the private company Pineal Foundation and frequently classified as a religious cult. Its name originates from the pineal gland, which is connected to sleeping patterns.

== History ==
Água Akbal Pinheiro, a cook born in Zimbabwe under the name Martin Junior Kenny, migrated to the United Kingdom at the age of 20 with the aim of becoming a cooking master. However, at age 36, he had a "deep spiritual experience" and created the identity of Água Akbal Pinheiro, a "spiritual philosopher" with the goal of "restoring, protecting and preserving organic, natural, spiritual, cultural and indigenous lifestyles".

In 2019 or 2020, Akbal Pinheiro and his wife, a Polish woman named Shakti, alias Gabriela Luna Pinheiro, migrated with their two children to Portugal and, together with forty people from eight different countries, they established the community in a plot of land acquired by Ugandan-born South Sudanese-turned-Danish footballer Pione Sisto, which would become the Kingdom of Pineal.

Eventually, the plot started housing greenhouses and other structures, while the community had reportedly reached a hundred members, among them several children, who were not registered and lived without any access to school or healthcare, without following Portuguese law. The sect gained notoriety after a 2022 event became public where one of Água and Gabriela's children died of only fourteen months of age, later being cremated and its ashes spread without being recorded.

Among the members, almost exclusively consisting of foreigners, there was a Portuguese woman, Cátia Guerreiro, which gave birth to a female child in December 2022, whose father was also a member of the sect. Cátia's parents, after becoming aware of the death of the other child, registered her at the registrar's office, against the will of the child's mother, thus being recognized as a Portuguese citizen. Later, the case was taken to the Family and Minors Court, requiring the child's guardian, soliciting an urgent intervention for the situation her granddaughter was facing.

All of the controversies surrounding the sect led to the withdrawal of a large part of its members, being reported that, there, only the founder, the companion and the two children remained as of late 2023, with the children being forced to attend school.

== Characteristics ==
The sect's goal is the building of Paradise on Earth, through the creation of a sovereign, self-suficient and ecological state.

The community practices polygamy, with its leader causing the pregnancies of several women. According to Água Akbal Pinheiro, husbands can have several wives, but a wife can only have a husband.

== Criminal cases ==
A male baby named Samsara, born on 11 February 2021, son of the sect's leader, died in March of April 2022 of an unidentified disease, without being followed by a doctor. The Public Prosecution Service began investigating the death of the child in 2023, especially for the lack of adequate healthcare, circumstance that would indicate a risk of death to other children of the community, which could lead to an intervention from the Commission for the Protection of Children and Youth (CPCJ).

The municipal government of Oliveira do Hospital also solicited CPCJ's intervention, as well as the Foreigners and Borders Service, to investigate the community, reporting illegal constructions, parties, drug trafficking and eventual scams with donations from members of the community as illicit.
