= Max Møller =

Danish footballer (born 1943)

Personal information
- Date of birth: 10 June 1943 (age 83)

International career
Years	Team	Apps	(Gls)
1964–1965	Denmark	6	(0)

Max Møller (born 10 June 1943) is a Danish footballer. He played in six matches for the Denmark national football team from 1964 to 1965.
