= Matthias Præst =

Danish footballer (born 2000)

Personal information
- Full name: Matthias Præst Nielsen
- Date of birth: 21 June 2000 (age 26)
- Place of birth: Denmark
- Height: 1.75 m (5 ft 9 in)
- Position: Midfielder

Team information
- Current team: Middelfart
- Number: 8

Youth career
- Dalby IF
- Kolding BK
- 2013–2017: Vejle
- 2018–2019: Horsens

Senior career*
Years	Team	Apps	(Gls)
2019–2020	Horsens	1	(0)
2020–2022	Middelfart	25	(1)
2022–2023	AB Argir	15	(0)
2023	HB Tórshavn	27	(5)
2024	Fylkir	27	(4)
2025	KR	25	(3)
2026–	Middelfart	24	(7)
- * Club domestic league appearances and goals as of 20:35, 3 October 2026 (UTC)

Matthias Præst Nielsen (born 21 June 2000) is a Danish footballer who plays for Danish 1st Division club Middelfart Boldklub as a midfielder.

== Career ==
=== Club career ===
On 27 July 2020 it was confirmed, that Præst had joined Danish 2nd Division club Middelfart Boldklub on a deal until the summer 2022.

In January 2024, Præst joined Icelandic Besta deild karla club Fylkir. In August 2024, ahead of the 2025 season, Præst signed a three-year contract with fellow league club KR.

On 2 February 2026, Præst returned to Middelfart Boldklub, signing a contract with the club until June 2027.
