= Hamse Hussein =

Danish footballer (born 2000)

Personal information
- Full name: Hamse Mahdi Hussein
- Date of birth: 7 January 2000 (age 26)
- Place of birth: Denmark
- Position: Midfielder

Youth career
- Vejgaard BK
- AaB
- 2018–2019: Hobro IK

Senior career*
Years	Team	Apps	(Gls)
2019–2020	Hobro IK	4	(0)
- * Club domestic league appearances and goals as of 18:15, 9 July 2020 (UTC)

Hamse Mahdi Hussein (born 7 January 2000) is a Danish footballer who plays as a midfielder.

== Youth career ==
Hussein started his career at Vejgaard BK before joining AaB as a U13 player. In May 2016, 16-year Hussein signed a three-year deal with AaB. In the 2017/18 season, he was instrumental in securing silver medals in the U19 League for AaB, before leaving the club during the season to join Hobro IK. Here Hussein became a regular part of the U19 team, while it also turned into a lot of matches in the Reserve League as well as training with the first team squad.

== Career ==
=== Hobro IK ===
In September 2018, Hussein was called up for his first ever first team game in the Danish Cup against Ledøje-Smørum Fodbold. However, he remained on the benh. He was also on the bench for three games later in the 2018–19 season but didn't get his official debut until 23 August 2019 against Odense Boldklub. Hussein started on the bench but replaced Julian Kristoffersen in the 91st minute.

On 12 August 2020 the club confirmed, that Hussein had left the club.

== See also ==
- Mathies Skjellerup
