= Mathies Skjellerup =

Danish footballer (born 1996)

Personal information
- Date of birth: 23 May 1996 (age 30)
- Place of birth: Denmark
- Positions: Winger; forward

Team information
- Current team: VSK Aarhus

Youth career
- Mariager IK
- Hobro IK

Senior career*
Years	Team	Apps	(Gls)
2016–2020	Hobro IK	9	(1)
2020–	VSK Aarhus	0	(0)
- * Club domestic league appearances and goals as of 11:52, 13 August 2020 (UTC)

Mathies Skjellerup (born 23 May 1996) is a Danish footballer who plays for Danish 2nd Division club VSK Aarhus.

== Career ==
=== Club career ===
On 29 August 2020, Skjellerup moved to Danish 2nd Division club VSK Aarhus.

== See also ==
- Hamse Hussein
