= Christian Hørby =

Danish footballer (born 2001)

Personal information
- Full name: Christian Brøgger Hørby
- Date of birth: 18 March 2001 (age 25)
- Place of birth: Assentoft, Denmark
- Height: 1.82 m (6 ft 0 in)
- Position: Midfielder

Team information
- Current team: Fremad Amager
- Number: 11

Youth career
- SIF-Assentoft
- –2019: Randers
- 2019–2020: Hobro

Senior career*
Years	Team	Apps	(Gls)
2020–2021	Hobro	14	(0)
2021–2023	Thisted	28	(4)
2023–2024	Hobro	16	(0)
2024–2026	Thisted	46	(8)
2026–	Fremad Amager	9	(4)
- * Club domestic league appearances and goals as of 3 October 2026

Christian Brøgger Hørby (born 17 March 2001) is a Danish professional footballer, who plays as a midfielder for Fremad Amager.

== Club career ==
=== Hobro IK ===
In the summer 2019, Hørby left Randers FC and went on a trial at Hobro IK and played in a game for the clubs reserve team, which earned him a spot on the Hobro's U19 squad.

On 5 July 2020, Hørby got his official debut for Hobro in the Danish Superliga against his former club Randers FC. Hørby started on the bench, but replaced Edgar Babayan in the 60th minute.

=== Thisted and return to Hobro ===
On 20 August 2021, Hørby joined Thisted FC. After two seasons at Thisted, Hobro IK confirmed on 4 July 2023, that Hørby had returned to the club, signing a deal until June 2025. Hobro played very few minutes before the club confirmed on 1 August 2024 that they had terminated the player's contract by mutual agreement with Hørby.

On 2 August 2024 Thisted confirmed that Hørby returned to Thisted FC on a one-year deal. In July 2025, Hørby's contract was extended.

=== Fremad Amager ===
On 8 June 2026, Hørby joined fellow Danish 2nd Division side Fremad Amager on a contract.
