= Sebastian Denius =

Danish footballer (born 1995)

Personal information
- Full name: Sebastian Denius Nielsen
- Date of birth: 8 June 1995 (age 31)
- Position: Attacking midfielder

Youth career
- Viborg

Senior career*
Years	Team	Apps	(Gls)
2013–2016	Viborg	3	(0)
2015	→ Kjellerup (loan)		
2016–2018	Kjellerup	56	(9)
2018–2022	Skive	124	(22)
2022–2024	Kolding	40	(7)
2024–2025	Aarhus Fremad	47	(8)

Managerial career
- 2023–2024: Kolding (transition coach)
- * Club domestic league appearances and goals

Sebastian Denius Nielsen (born 8 June 1995) is a Danish retired professional footballer who played as an attacking midfielder.

== Career ==
Denius moved from Kjellerup to Skive in July 2018, and to Kolding in July 2022. In January 2023, Kolding confirmed that Denius would also take on the role of transition coach, while remaining a player at the club. On 26 January 2024, the club confirmed that Denius had had his contract terminated as he was seeking more playing time.

On 16 February 2024, Denius joined Danish 2nd Division side Aarhus Fremad. In June 2025, after a season where the club gained promotion to the 2025-26 Danish 1st Division, Denius left the club.

On 2 September 2025, Denius announced his retirement from football, at the age of 30.
