= Mikkel Lassen =

Danish footballer (born 2001)

Personal information
- Full name: Mikkel Møller Lassen
- Date of birth: 19 June 2001 (age 25)
- Place of birth: Odder, Denmark
- Height: 1.81 m (5 ft 11 in)
- Positions: Right-back; centre-back

Team information
- Current team: Moss
- Number: 6

Youth career
- –2013: Odder IGF
- 2013–2019: AGF

Senior career*
Years	Team	Apps	(Gls)
2019–2021	AGF	1	(0)
2021	→ Skive (loan)	11	(2)
2021	→ Horsens (loan)	10	(0)
2022–2024	Horsens	52	(2)
2023	→ Fredrikstad (loan)	7	(0)
2024–2025	Vendsyssel	33	(0)
2025–	Moss	12	(0)

International career
2017	Denmark U16	3	(0)
2017–2018	Denmark U17	11	(1)
2018–2019	Denmark U18	7	(0)
- * Club domestic league appearances and goals as of 14 November 2026

Mikkel Møller Lassen (born 19 June 2001) is a Danish professional footballer who plays for Norwegian First Division club Moss FK.

== Club career ==
Lassen is a product of the AGF youth system, joining the club as a 11-year-old in 2013 from his hometown club Odder IGF. He was the team captain from under-14 through under-19 levels. In 2017, he signed a three-year youth contract with AGF.

In 2019, he began training with the first team. He made his official debut for AGF on 11 September 2019, when Jesper Juelsgård was injured during the warm-up for the Danish Cup match against the Funen Series team Marstal/Rise. AGF trailed 2–0, but won 2–6 after extra time. On 7 October 2019, he extended his contract with AGF until the summer of 2024. The contract replaced the previous youth contract the following summer, and at the same time he also became a permanent part of the club's first-team squad.

On 4 October 2020, Lassen made his Danish Superliga debut for AGF when he was substituted in the final minutes of the match – a match that ended in a 1–1 draw against AaB.

On 1 February 2021, Lassen moved on loan to Skive IK until the end of the season. On 1 September 2021, Lassen was loaned out again, this time to AC Horsens until the end of 2021.

On 7 December 2021, following 13 appearances in all competitions during his loan deal at AC Horsens, Lassen signed a permanent deal making him a Horsens player from 1 January 2022. In mid-August 2023, Lassen moved to Norwegian First Division side Fredrikstad FK on a loan deal until the end of 2023.

On July 8, 2024, fellow league club, Danish 1st Division club Vendsyssel FF, confirmed that Lassen joined the club on a contract until June 2027.

On 2 September 2025, Lassen joined Norwegian First Division club Moss FK.
