= Mathias Kristensen (footballer, born 1993) =

Danish footballer (born 1993)

Personal information
- Date of birth: 24 June 1993 (age 33)
- Place of birth: Glamsbjerg, Denmark
- Height: 2.01 m (6 ft 7 in)
- Position: Forward

Team information
- Current team: Næstved
- Number: 13

Youth career
- Glamsbjerg IF

Senior career*
| Years | Team | Apps | (Gls) |
| 2011–2017 | Tarup-Paarup | ? | (?) |
| 2018 | Horsens | 8 | (2) |
| 2019–2022 | Nykøbing | 94 | (50) |
| 2022–2024 | Lyngby | 25 | (2) |
| 2023–2024 | → Kolding (loan) | 18 | (2) |
| 2024–2025 | Næstved | 19 | (5) |
| Total | | 164+ | (61+) |
- * Club domestic league appearances and goals

Mathias Kristensen (born 24 June 1993) is a Danish former professional footballer who played as a forward.

== Career ==
In December 2017, Kristensen signed with AC Horsens after scoring 58 goals in three seasons for Tarup-Paarup in the Denmark Series. He left the club again in December 2018.

On 15 February 2019, Kristensen signed with Nykøbing FC for the rest of the season. After an excellent season in Nykøbing, where the 28-year-old striker was top scorer in the Danish 1st Division and also voted Player of the Year by Spillerforeningen, it was confirmed on 2 June 2022, that Kristensen had joined newly promoted Danish Superliga club Lyngby Boldklub, signing a deal until June 2025. On 18 July 2023 it was confirmed, that Kristensen had moved to newly promoted Danish 1st Division side Kolding IF on a season-long loan deal. After a loan spell that was ruined by injuries, Kristensen returned to Lyngby after the season.

In August 2024, Kristensen signed for newly relegated Danish 2nd Division club Næstved Boldklub. After struggling with persistent knee problems over an extended period, Næstved confirmed in December 2025 that Kristensen would leave the club at the turn of the year.

== Honours ==
Nykøbing

- Danish 2nd Division: 2020–21

Individual

- Danish 2nd Division Player of the Season: 2020–21
- Danish 1st Division Player of the Season: 2021–22
