= Diego Montiel (footballer, born 1995) =

Swedish footballer (born 1995)

Personal information
- Full name: Diego Nicolas Montiel
- Date of birth: 26 April 1995 (age 31)
- Place of birth: Västerås, Sweden
- Height: 1.80 m (5 ft 11 in)
- Position: Midfielder

Team information
- Current team: KA
- Number: 20

Youth career
- IK Franke
- Västerås

Senior career*
Years	Team	Apps	(Gls)
2012–2013	Västerås	1	(0)
2013–2014	Brommapojkarna	0	(0)
2014	Västerås	13	(3)
2015–2016	Dalkurd	53	(6)
2017	Sirius	5	(0)
2017	→ Gefle (loan)	14	(2)
2018	Örgryte	28	(13)
2019	Beerschot	2	(0)
2019–2021	Vejle	43	(12)
2021–2023	Vendsyssel	27	(2)
2024	Varbergs BoIS	22	(2)
2025	Vestri	27	(5)
2026-	KA	16	(1)

International career
2012	Sweden U17	2	(0)
- * Club domestic league appearances and goals as of 16 November 2026

Diego Nicolas Montiel (born 26 April 1995) is a Swedish professional footballer who plays as a midfielder for KA.

== Club career ==
Montiel had youth spells with IK Franke and Västerås SK, he made his first-team debut with the latter on 7 July 2012 in a Division 1 Norra match against Östersund. In 2013, Montiel joined Allsvenskan club IF Brommapojkarna. He was named on the substitutes bench twice for the club's 2014–15 UEFA Europa League first qualifying round ties against VPS. After not appearing for the club's senior team he left and rejoined Västerås SK in 2014. He went onto score three goals in thirteen fixtures during the 2014 Division 1 season. In January 2015, Montiel completed a transfer to fellow Division 1 Norra team Dalkurd FF.

He participated in twenty-four games in his debut season with them as they won promotion to the 2016 Superettan. On 11 November 2016, it was announced that Montiel had agreed to sign for Allsvenskan side IK Sirius on a three-year contract and would officially join on 1 January 2017. He made his debut for IK Sirius in a Svenska Cupen match versus Arameisk-Syrianska IF and scored the fifth goal in a 0–5 win. On 28 July, Montiel joined Superettan side Gefle IF on loan. He scored his first Gefle goal in his second match, on 6 August, against IFK Värnamo. In total, Montiel scored two goals in fourteen matches for Gefle as they finished 12th.

He terminated his contract with Sirius in November 2017. On 5 December, Montiel agreed to join Superettan club Örgryte IS. In his opening six matches, Montiel scored five goals and assisted four. He ended the 2018 campaign as top scorer, netting thirteen goals alongside fourteen assists in twenty-eight appearances. He departed at the conclusion of his contract in December. At the end of the month, Montiel secured a move to Beerschot Wilrijk of the Belgian First Division B. In July 2019, Beerschot allowed Montiel to speak to a Swedish club with a view to a transfer. Västerås SK revealed he was training with them on 8 July.

On 15 July 2019, Vejle BK confirmed that they had signed Montiel on a two-year contract. He scored twice, versus Nykøbing and Vendsyssel FF, in his first three appearances for Vejle BK.

After two seasons at Vejle, Montiel joined Danish 1st Division club Vendsyssel FF on a two-year deal on 8 July 2021. He left the club at the end of his contract in June 2023.

On 9 January 2024, Montiel joined newly relegated Superettan side Varbergs BoIS.

On 14 December 2024, Icelandic side Vestri announced the signing of Montiel.

== International career ==
Montiel, who is of Uruguayan descent, has represented Sweden at U17 level, debuting in a friendly tournament match against Iceland U17 in July 2014. His next cap came later that month in the same competition against Romania U17.

== Career statistics ==
As of 16 August 2019.

Club statistics
Club	Season	League			Cup		Continental		Other		Total	
Club	Season	Division	Apps	Goals	Apps	Goals	Apps	Goals	Apps	Goals	Apps	Goals
Västerås SK	2012	Division 1 Norra	1	0	0	0	—		0	0	1	0
IF Brommapojkarna	2013	Allsvenskan	0	0	0	0	—		0	0	0	0
IF Brommapojkarna	2014	Allsvenskan	0	0	0	0	0	0	0	0	0	0
IF Brommapojkarna	Total		0	0	0	0	0	0	0	0	0	0
Västerås SK	2014	Division 1 Norra	13	3	2	0	—		0	0	15	3
Dalkurd FF	2015	Division 1 Norra	24	3	3	0	—		0	0	27	3
Dalkurd FF	2016	Superettan	29	3	1	0	—		0	0	30	3
Dalkurd FF	Total		53	6	4	0	—		0	0	57	6
IK Sirius	2017	Allsvenskan	5	0	2	1	—		0	0	7	1
Gefle IF (loan)	2017	Superettan	14	2	1	0	—		0	0	15	2
Örgryte IS	2018	Superettan	28	13	0	0	—		0	0	28	13
Beerschot Wilrijk	2018–19	First Division B	2	0	—		—		6 (Note: Appearance(s) in the UEFA Europa League play-offs)	0	8	0
Vejle BK	2019–20	1st Division	4	2	0	0	—		0	0	4	2
Career total			120	26	9	1	0	0	6	0	135	27

== Honours ==
Dalkurd FF

- Division 1 Norra: 2015

‘Vestri’

- Mjólkurbikarinn: 2025
