= Espelundens Idrætsanlæg =

Football stadium in Denmark

Coordinates: 55°40′29″N 12°25′51″E

Tømrermester Jim Jensens Park
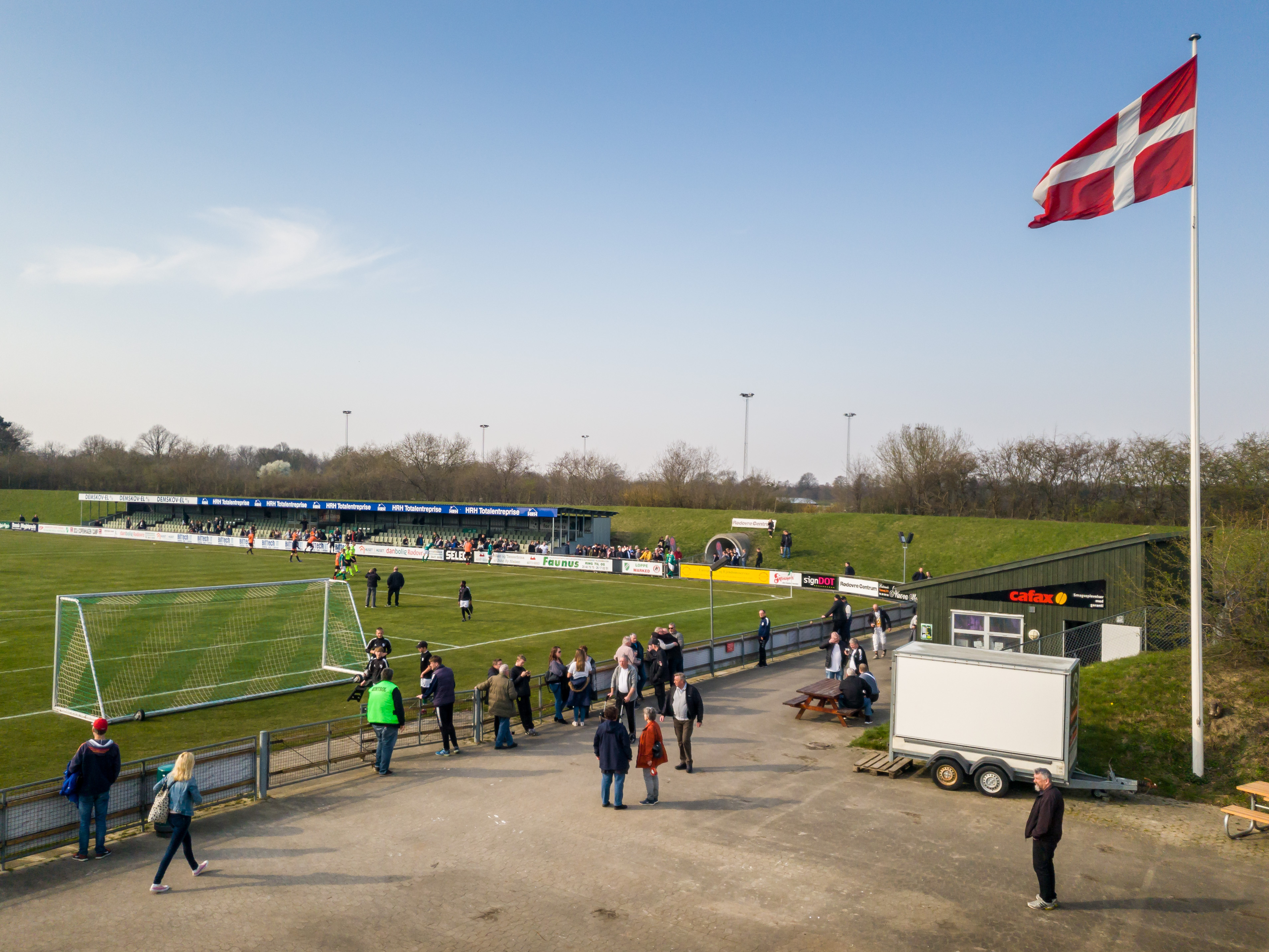
- Entrance area
- Interactive map of Tømrermester Jim Jensens Park
- Full name: Tømrermester Jim Jensens Park
- Former names: Espelundens Idrætsanlæg (1960–present); Tømrermester Jim Jensens Park (2020–present)
- Location: Korsdalsvej 100; DK-2610 Rødovre
- Capacity: 6,000 (460 seats)
- Surface: Natural grass
- Field size: 105 by 68 metres (114.8 yd × 74.4 yd)

Construction
- Built: 1960

Tenants
- Avarta (1960–present); Islev Boldklub; GIF Orient Fodbold

Espelundens Idrætsanlæg is an association football facility in Rødovre, Denmark. It is the home stadium of 2nd Division club Boldklubben Avarta and lower league side Islev Boldklub, who have their club house 100 m north of the stadium. The facility consists of the stadium, which has a capacity of 6,000 of which 460 are seated, the ground also includes a cafeteria, seven additional grass pitches, three gravel pitches, six mini pitches and a roller hockey rink. In January 2020 it was renamed Tømrermester Jim Jensens Park, after the naming rights were acquired by carpenter Jim Jensen, who renamed the stadium after himself.

The additional grass pitches are used as reserve grounds for GIF Orient Fodbold.

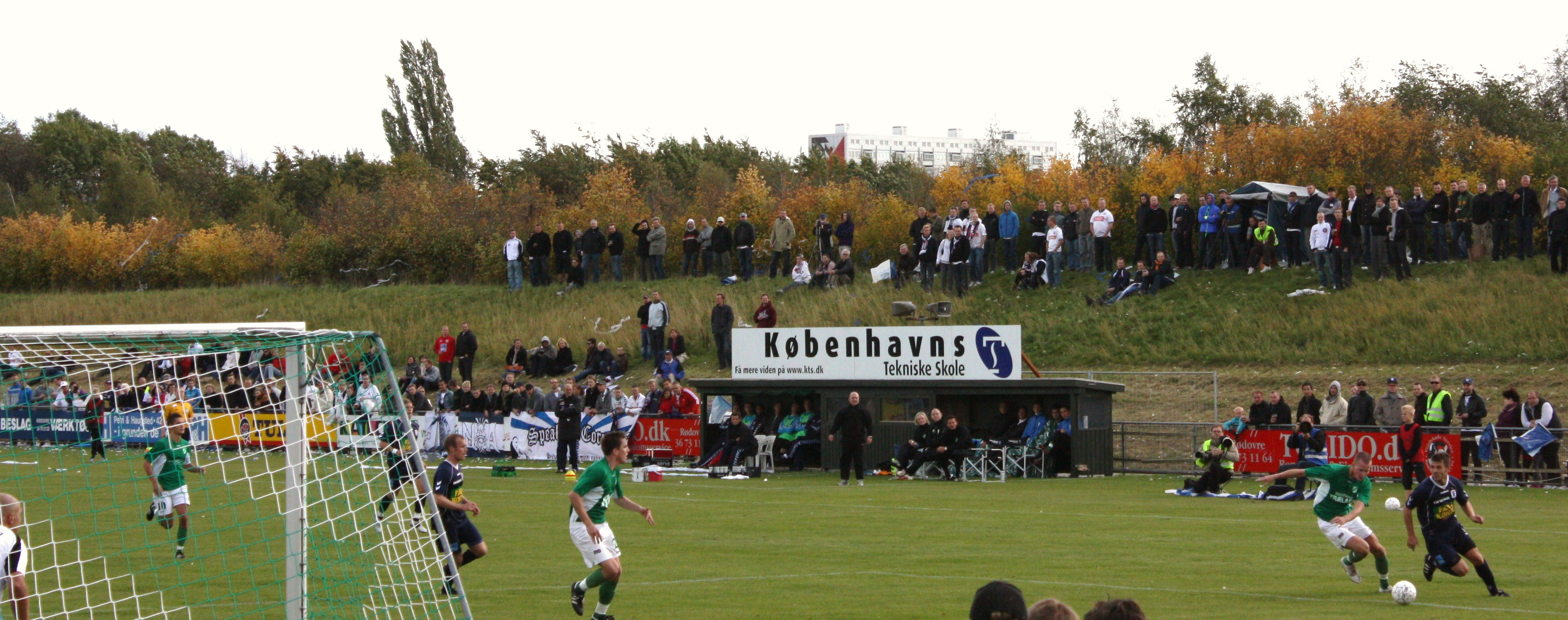
Danish Cup match between Avarta and AGF in September 2008

== Panorama ==
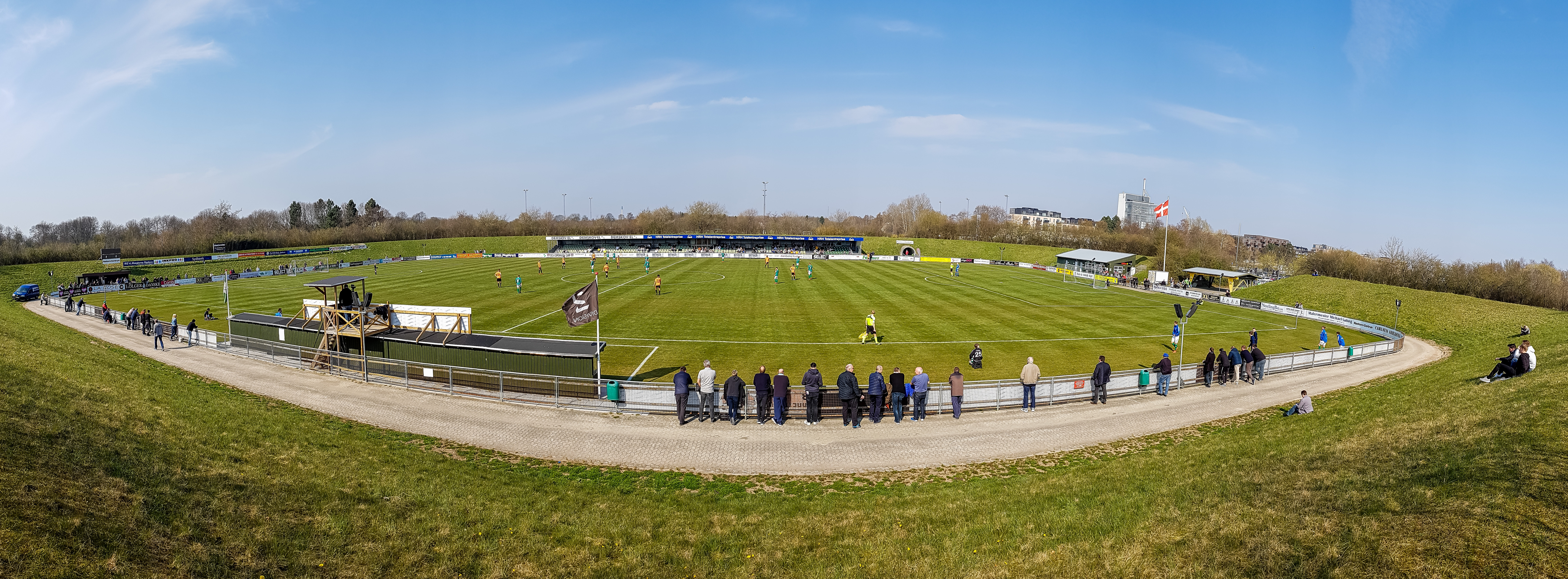
Panorama of the stadium in a match between Avarta and Hillerød Fodbold in April 2019
