= Maxime Soulas =

French footballer (born 1999)

Personal information
- Full name: Maxime Henry Armand Soulas
- Date of birth: 19 May 1999 (age 27)
- Place of birth: Montpellier, France
- Position: Centre-back

Team information
- Current team: Sønderjyske
- Number: 12

Youth career
- –2017: Montpellier
- 2016–2017: → PSV Eindhoven (loan)
- 2017–2019: PSV Eindhoven

Senior career*
Years	Team	Apps	(Gls)
2017–2020	Jong PSV	67	(1)
2020–2021	Fremad Amager	35	(0)
2021–	Sønderjyske	135	(7)
- * Club domestic league appearances and goals as of 19 May 2026

Maxime Henry Armand Soulas (born 19 May 1999) is a French football player who plays as a centre-back for Danish Superliga club Sønderjyske.

== Club career ==
On 1 July 2017, Soulas signed his professional deal with PSV Eindhoven, signing a contract until 2020. He made his Eerste Divisie debut for Jong PSV on 1 September 2017 in a game against Jong Ajax.

On 11 August 2020, Soulas joined Danish 1st Division club Fremad Amager. A year later, on 28 August 2021, Soulas moved to Danish Superliga club SønderjyskE, signing a deal until June 2025.
