= Rasmus Nissen (footballer, born 2001) =

Danish footballer

Personal information
- Full name: Rasmus Reihdar Nissen
- Date of birth: 25 June 2001 (age 25)
- Place of birth: Odense, Denmark
- Position: Forward

Team information
- Current team: Marienlyst
- Number: 9

Youth career
- OKS
- Næsby
- SønderjyskE
- OB

Senior career*
Years	Team	Apps	(Gls)
2020–2022	OB	3	(0)
2021–2022	→ Kolding (loan)	12	(1)
2022	B36 Tórshavn	12	(6)
2023–2024	Næsby		
2024–	Marienlyst		
- * Club domestic league appearances and goals as of 23:34, 18 January 2025 (UTC)

Rasmus Reihdar Nissen (born 25 June 2001) is a Danish professional footballer who plays as a forward for Denmark Series side BK Marienlyst.

== Club career ==
=== OB ===
With a past at OKS, Næsby Boldklub and a short spell at Kolding, Nissen joined OB as a youth player. He got his official debut for OB on 8 July 2020, playing the whole game against Silkeborg IF in the Danish Superliga.

After a good season with 10 goals and 5 assist in 15 games with OB's U19 team – who won the 2019–20 U19 league – Nissen signed his first two-year professional contract on 15 July 2020, which also included a promotion to the first team squad. However, in February 2021 out of a sudden, Nissen was told that he had no future in OB and was sent down to play and train with the U19s again.

On 21 June 2021 it was confirmed, that Nissen had signed a one-year loan deal with newly relegated Danish 2nd Division club Kolding IF, effective from 1 July.

=== Later career ===
On 11 July 2022 it was confirmed, that Nissen had signed with Faroese club B36 Tórshavn. After six month in the Faroe Islands, Nissen returned to Denmark and signed with his former team, Næsby Boldklub.

Ahead of the 2024–25 season, Nissen joined BK Marienlyst.
