= Mads Greve =

Danish footballer (born 1989)

Personal information
- Full name: Mads Juul Greve
- Date of birth: 12 September 1989 (age 37)
- Place of birth: Denmark
- Height: 1.95 m (6 ft 5 in)
- Position: Centre-back

Youth career
- Middelfart
- OB

Senior career*
Years	Team	Apps	(Gls)
2010	OB	0	(0)
2010–2013	Fredericia	36	(0)
2013–2017	Vendsyssel	118	(8)
2017–2021	Vejle	113	(8)
2021–2025	Vendsyssel	100	(2)
2025–2026	Middelfart	38	(3)
Total		405	(21)

Managerial career
- 2026–: Middelfart (assistant)
- * Club domestic league appearances and goals

Mads Greve (born 12 September 1989) is a former Danish professional footballer who played as a centre-back. He is currently the assistantmanager for Middelfart Boldklub.

== Club career ==
Playing for Odense Boldklub in his youth-period, he moved to FC Fredericia in August 2010. In June 2013 he moved to Vendsyssel FF where he played 118 league matches for the club, before moving to Vejle Boldklub in 2017. In August 2021 he joined Vendsyssel FF again.

On 7 January 2025 it was confirmed that Greve was returning to his former youth club, Danish 2nd Division side Middelfart Boldklub, on a deal until June 2026.

On May 26, 2026, he announced that he would retire from his playing career, subsequently becoming an assistant coach for Middelfart Boldklub.
