= 2023 IFK Norrköping season =

Swedish Football Season Article

IFK Norrköping
2023 season
- Chairman: Sakarias Mårdh
- Head coach: Glen Riddersholm
- Stadium: Nya Parken
- Allsvenskan: 5th
- 2022–23 Svenska Cupen: Quarter-final
- 2023–24 Svenska Cupen: Second-Round
- Top goalscorer: Arnór Traustason (8)
Home colours	Away colours	Third colours

The 2023 season is IFK Norrköping's 83rd season in Allsvenskan and their 12th consecutive season in the league. They compete in Allsvenskan and Svenska Cupen. League play started on April 2 and ended on November 12th.

== Club ==
=== Players ===
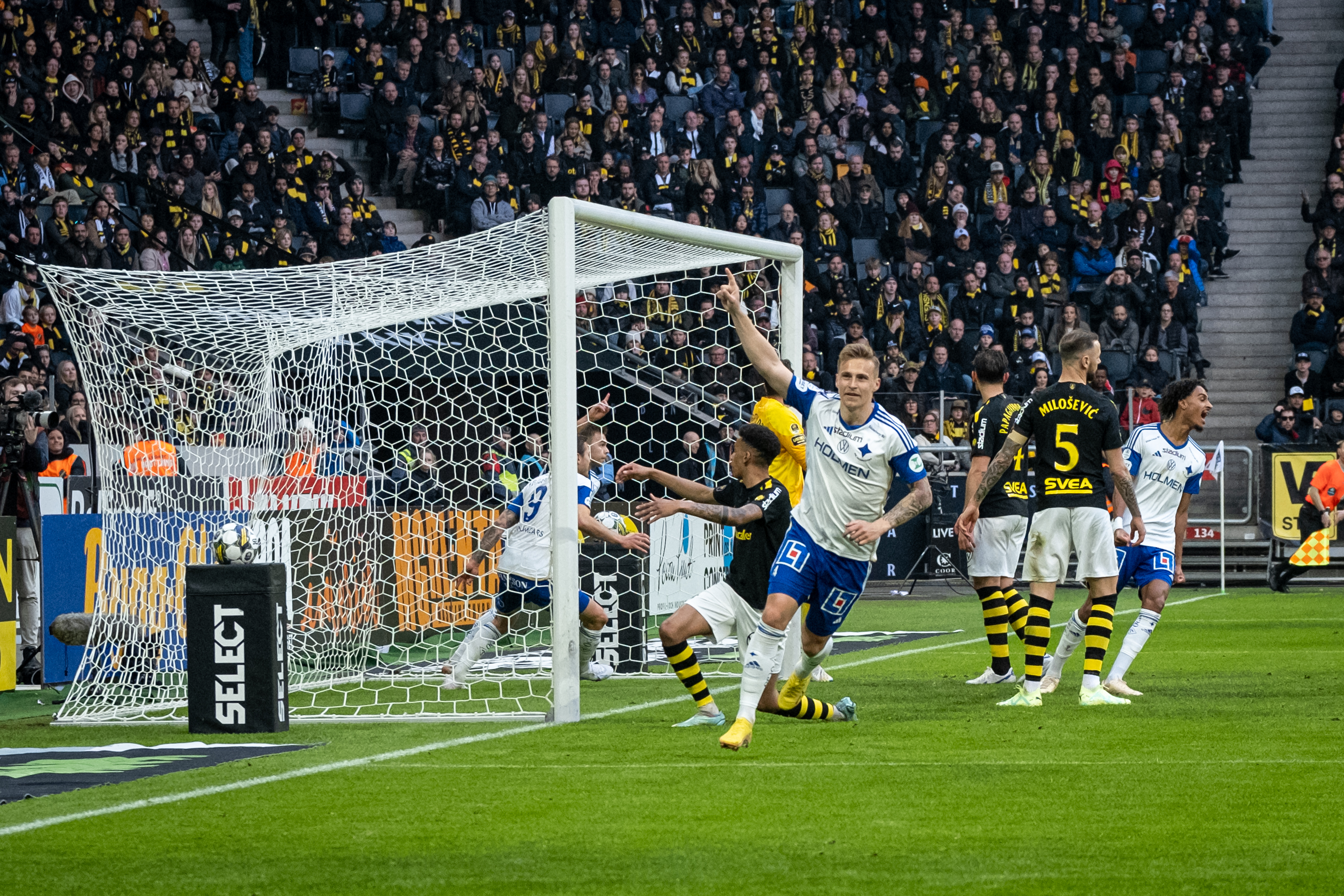
Traustason score for IFK Norrköping against AIK, 10th April 2023

As of 19 August 2023

Note: Flags indicate national team as defined under FIFA eligibility rules; some limited exceptions apply. Players may hold more than one non-FIFA nationality.

No.	Pos.	Nation	Player
—	DF	SWE	Kevin Höög Jansson
—	MF	ALB	Laorent Shabani
1	GK	SWE	Oscar Jansson
3	DF	DEN	Marcus Baggesen
4	DF	DEN	Marco Lund
5	FW	SWE	Christoffer Nyman ( Captain)
6	DF	SWE	Isak Ssewankambo
7	MF	SWE	Jacob Ortmark
8	FW	ISL	Ísak Andri Sigurgeirsson
9	MF	ISL	Arnór Traustason
10	MF	DEN	Vito Hammershøy-Mistrati
11	DF	SWE	Christopher Telo
14	DF	SWE	Yahya Kalley

No.	Pos.	Nation	Player
16	MF	SWE	Elvis Lindkvist
17	MF	SWE	Laorent Shabani
18	MF	ISL	Ari Skúlason
19	FW	DEN	Victor Lind
20	DF	NOR	Daniel Eid
21	MF	SWE	Jesper Ceesay
22	FW	ISL	Andri Guðjohnsen
23	MF	SWE	Maic Sema
24	DF	SWE	Anton Eriksson
26	MF	SWE	Kristoffer Khazeni
28	MF	SWE	Fritiof Hellichius
35	MF	GHA	Stephen Bolma
45	FW	SWE	Emil Roback

=== Coaching staff ===
Name	Role
(Denmark) Glen Riddersholm	Head coach
(Sweden) Martin Sjögren	Assistant coach
(Sweden) Fredrik Landén	Assistant coach
(Sweden) Christian Tiritiello	Assistant coach & goalkeeper coach
Simon Larsson	Coordinator
Peter Cratz	Doctor
Bengt Janzon	Doctor
Lennart Linder	Equipment manager
Nicolas Santi Aguilar	Physiotherapist
Kristoffer Karlsson	Physiotherapist
Daniel Ekvall	Sports psychologist

=== Other information ===
Chairman	(Sweden) Sakarias Mårdh (since February 2020)
Ground (capacity and dimensions)	Nya Parken (17,234 / 105x68 m)

Source: IFK Norrköping and Nya Parken

== Competitions ==
=== Overview ===
Competition	First match	Last match	Starting round	Final position	Record							
Competition	First match	Last match	Starting round	Final position	Pld	W	D	L	GF	GA	GD	Win %
Allsvenskan	2 April 2023	12 November 2023	Matchday 1	5th	21	10	4	7	36	27	+9	47.62
2022–23 Svenska Cupen	1 September 2022	11 March 2023	Second Round	Quarter-finals	5	3	1	1	10	6	+4	60.00
2023–24 Svenska Cupen	24 August 2023	To 2024 Season	Second Round	Group stage	1	1	0	0	6	0	+6	100.00
Total					27	14	5	8	52	33	+19	51.85

Last updated: 28 August 2023
Source: Competitions

=== Allsvenskan ===
==== League table ====
Pos	Team	Pld	W	D	L	GF	GA	GD	Pts
7	Hammarby IF	30	11	11	8	41	39	+2	44
8	IK Sirius	30	12	6	12	51	44	+7	42
9	IFK Norrköping	30	12	5	13	45	45	0	41
10	Mjällby AIF	30	12	5	13	32	34	−2	41
11	AIK	30	9	9	12	34	38	−4	36

Source: svenskfotboll.se (in Swedish)
Rules for classification: 1) Points; 2) Goal difference; 3) Goals scored; 4) Head-to-head points; 5) Head-to-head goal difference; 6) Play-off
(Note: Play-off is only played if need to decide champion, teams for relegation or UEFA competition and will be played on a neutral ground).

==== Results summary ====
Overall								Home						Away					
Pld	W	D	L	GF	GA	GD	Pts	W	D	L	GF	GA	GD	W	D	L	GF	GA	GD
29	12	5	12	45	43	+2	41	7	2	6	21	19	+2	5	3	6	24	24	0

Last updated: 6 November 2023.
Source: everysport.com (in English)

==== Results by round ====
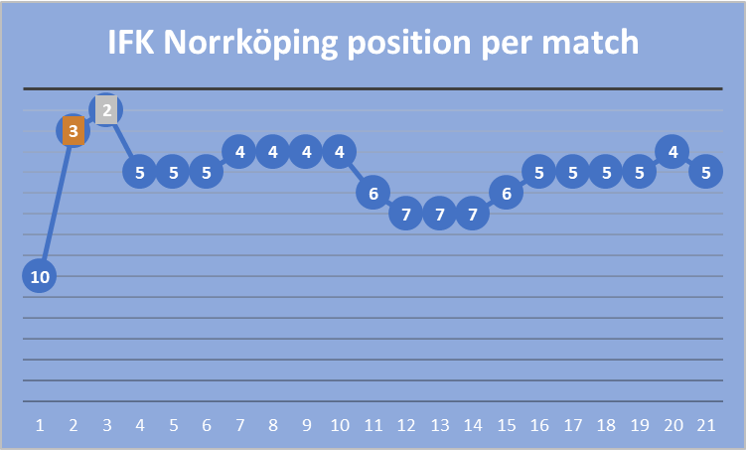

Round	1	2	3	4	5	6	7	8	9	10	11	12	13	14	15	16	17	18	19	20	21	22	23	24	25	26	27	28	29	30
Ground	H	A	H	A	A	H	A	A	H	A	H	A	H	H	A	H	A	H	A	H	A	H	H	A	H	A	A	H	H	A
Result	D	W	W	L	D	W	W	W	L	L	L	D	D	L	W	W	L	W	W	W	L	L	L	D	W	L	L	L	W	
Position	10	3	2	5	5	5	4	4	4	4	6	7	7	7	6	5	5	5	5	4	5	6	6	7	6	7	8	8	8	
Points	1	4	7	7	8	11	14	17	17	17	17	18	19	19	22	25	25	28	31	34	34	34	34	35	38	38	38	38	41	

Updated to match(es) played on 6 November 2023. Source: everysport.com
A = Away; H = Home; W = Win; D = Draw; L = Loss

==== Matches ====
2 April 2023 1	IFK Norrköping	1–1	IK Sirius	Norrköping
15:00 CEST (UTC+2)	Lind 65'; Lund (yellow card); Ceesay (yellow card)	report	Alsanati 45+4', (yellow card); Stensson (yellow card); Wikman (yellow card)	Stadium: Nya Parken

10 April 2023 2	AIK	0–3	IFK Norrköping	Solna
15:00 CEST (UTC+2)	Papagiannopoulos (yellow card); Fesshaie (yellow card)	report	Nyman 30'; Traustason 40'; Sigurgeirsson 82'; Sigurdsson (yellow card); Roback (yellow card)	Stadium: Friends Arena

16 April 2023 3	IFK Norrköping	2–1	Värnamo	Norrköping
15:00 CEST (UTC+2)	Sigurgeirsson 15', 47'; Ortmark (yellow card)	report	Lund 45+3' (o.g.)	Stadium: Nya Parken

24 April 2023 4	Malmö FF	3–0	IFK Norrköping	Malmö
19:10 CEST (UTC+2)	Thelin 14'; Vecchia 72'; Ali 78'	report	Lind (yellow card) 53'; Lund (yellow card) 90'	Stadium: Eleda Stadion

1 May 2023 5	IFK Göteborg	1–1	IFK Norrköping	Gothenburg
15:00 CEST (UTC+2)	Ohlsson 7'	report	Nyman 27'	Stadium: Gamla Ullevi

4 May 2023 6	IFK Norrköping	2–0	Hammarby Fotboll	Norrköping
19:00 CEST (UTC+2)	Nyman 79', 85'	report		Stadium: Nya Parken

8 May 2023 7	Degerfors IF	0–2	IFK Norrköping	Degerfors
19:00 CEST (UTC+2)		report	Traustason (yellow card) 15'; Nyman 24'; Sigurdsson 48'; Ceesay (yellow card) 51'	Stadium: Stora Valla

13 May 2023 8	Varbergs BolS	1–3	IFK Norrköping	Varberg
17:30 CEST (UTC+2)	Luke Le Roux 12'	report	Nyman 60'; Vito 69'; Khazeni 79'	Stadium: Påskbergsvallen

22 May 2023 9	IFK Norrköping	1–2	IF Elfsborg	Norrköping
19.10 CEST (UTC+2)	Ceesay (yellow card) 14'; Sigurdsson 28'	report	Gudjohnsen (yellow card) 20'; Okkels 75'; Traustason 85' (o.g.)	Stadium: Nya Parken

28 May 2023 10	Kalmar FF	2–1	IFK Norrköping	Kalmar
15:00 CEST (UTC+2)	Hümmet 87'; Rajović 90+1'	report	Victor Lind 59'; Ceesay (yellow card); Traustason (yellow card)	Stadium: Guldfågeln Arena

3 June 2023 11	IFK Norrköping	0–2	IF Brommapojkarna	Norrköping
17:30 CEST (UTC+2)		report	Fritzson 49'; Ćosić 90'	Stadium: Nya Parken

11 June 2023 12	Djurgårdens IF	2–2	IFK Norrköping	Stockholm
17:30 CEST (UTC+2)	Gudjohnsen 39' (o.g.); Danielsson 48'	report	Lund 27', (yellow card); Lind 34'; Eriksson (yellow card)	Stadium: Tele2 Arena

2 July 2023 13	IFK Norrköping	2–2	Häcken	Norrköping
CEST (UTC+2)				Stadium: Nya Parken

10 July 2023 14	IFK Norrköping	1–2	Halmstads BK	Norrköping
CEST (UTC+2)				Stadium: Nya Parken

16 July 2023 15	Mjällby AIF	1–2	IFK Norrköping	Mjällby
CEST (UTC+2)				Stadium: Strandvallen

23 July 2023 16	IFK Norrköping	1–0	Degerfors IF	Norrköping
CEST (UTC+2)				Stadium: Nya Parken

30 July 2023 17	Hammarby Fotboll	2–1	IFK Norrköping	Stockholm
CEST (UTC+2)				Stadium: Tele2 Arena

7 August 2023 18	IFK Norrköping	3–0	IFK Göteborg	Norrköping
CEST (UTC+2)				Stadium: Nya Parken

13 August 2023 29	Halmstads BK	1–3	IFK Norrköping	Halmstad
CEST (UTC+2)				Stadium: Örjans vall

21 August 2023 20	IFK Norrköping	3–1	AIK	Norrköping
19:10 CEST (UTC+2)	Nyman 8'; Traustason 22'; Lind 54'	report	Modesto 3'	Stadium: Nya Parken; Referee: Kristoffer Karlsson

28 August 2023 21	IF Elfsborg	3-2	IFK Norrköping	Borås
19:00 CEST (UTC+2)	Qasem 11'; Baidoo 20'; Okkels 59'	report	Lund 68'; Vito 83'	Stadium: Borås Arena; Attendance: 7456; Referee: Östling

3 September 2023 22	IFK Norrköping	0–2	Djurgårdens IF	Norrköping
17:30 CEST (UTC+2)	Ceesay (yellow card) 43'; Eriksson (yellow card) 59'	report	Nyman 63' (o.g.); Radetinac 76'	Stadium: Nya Parken; Attendance: 13,115; Referee: (Sweden) Granit Maqedonci

18 September 2023 23	IFK Norrköping	0–2	Mjällby AIF	Norrköping
19:00 CEST (UTC+2)	Lund (yellow card) 73'	report	Walta 47' 85'; Guðmundur Baldvin Nökkvason (yellow card) 90+7'	Stadium: Nya Parken; Attendance: 5,102; Referee: (Sweden) Victor Wolf

23 September 2023 24	IF Brommapojkarna	2–2	IFK Norrköping	Vällingby
17:30 CEST (UTC+2)	Pettersson 59'; Vasić (yellow card) 84' (goal) 90+1'	report	Sigurgeirsson 19'; Björk 29'; Hammershøy-Mistrati (yellow card) 66'; Daniel Eid (yellow card) 81'; Eriksson (yellow card) 89'	Stadium: Grimsta IP; Attendance: 1,735; Referee: (Sweden) Mohammed Al-Hakim

30 September 2023 25	IFK Norrköping	1–0	Kalmar FF	Norrköping
17:30 CEST (UTC+2)	Traustason (yellow card) 7'; Lind 36'	report		Stadium: Nya Parken; Attendance: 6,109; Referee: (Sweden) Adam Ladebäck

8 October 2023 26	IFK Värnamo	2–1	IFK Norrköping	Värnamo
15:00 CEST (UTC+2)	Zeljkovic 52' 70' (yellow card) 76'	report	Ceesay (yellow card) 5'; Sigurgeirsson 25'; Eriksson (yellow card) 64'	Stadium: Finnvedsvallen; Attendance: 2,463; Referee: (Sweden) Richard Sundell

22 October 2023 27	BK Häcken	4–1	IFK Norrköping	Gothenburg
17:30 CEST (UTC+2)	Sonko 11' 63' 77'; Chilufya 44'; Sandberg (yellow card) 55'	report	Nyman 22'	Stadium: Bravida Arena; Attendance: 4,338; Referee: (Sweden) Fredrik Klitte

29 October 2023 28	IFK Norrköping	0–1	Malmö FF	Norrköping
15:00 CEST (UTC+2)	Daniel Eid (yellow card) 26'; Eriksson (yellow card) 66'; Traustason (yellow card) 69'	report	Kiese Thelin 60'	Stadium: Nya Parken; Attendance: 8,566; Referee: (Sweden) Victor Wolf

6 November 2023 29	IFK Norrköping	4–3	Varbergs BolS	Norrköping
19:00 CEST (UTC+2)	Lind (yellow card) 38'; Lund (yellow card) 45+1'; Neffati 70'; Tolinsson (yellow card) 78'; Traustason 80'; Sigurgeirsson 83'; Sema 90'	report	Krasniqi (yellow card) 40' (goal) 45+2'; Zackrisson 44'; Mads Borchers 51'; Karlsson (yellow card) 54'; Leo Frigell Jansson (yellow card) 87'	Stadium: Nya Parken; Attendance: 3,125; Referee: (Sweden) Richard Sundell

12 November 2023 30	IK Sirius	v	IFK Norrköping	Uppsala
15:00 CEST (UTC+2)		report		Stadium: Studenternas IP

=== Svenska Cupen ===
==== 2022–23 ====
1 September 2022 Second Round	Täby	0–2	IFK Norrköping	Täby
17:00 CEST (UTC+2)	R.Holm (yellow card) 90+1'	Report	Sema 14'; Sigurðsson 50'	Stadium: Tibblevallen; Referee: Mohammed Al-Hakim

===== Group stage =====
Pos	Team	Pld	W	D	L	GF	GA	GD	Pts	Qualification
1	IFK Norrköping	3	2	1	0	8	3	+5	7	Advance to Knockout stage
2	GAIS	3	2	0	1	4	2	+2	6	
3	IFK Göteborg	3	1	0	2	4	8	−4	3	
4	Utsiktens BK	3	0	1	2	5	8	−3	1	

Source: SvFF
Rules for classification: 1) Points; 2) Goal difference; 3) Goals scored; 4) Head-to-head record; 5) Lowest disciplinary points; 6) Highest ranked team

19 February 2023 Matchday 1	GAIS	0–1	IFK Norrköping	Gothenburg
15:15		Report		Stadium: Gamla Ullevi

26 February 2023 Matchday 2	IFK Norrköping	3–3	Utsiktens BK	Norrköping
13:00		Report		Stadium: PlatinumCars Arena

5 March 2023 Matchday 3	IFK Göteborg	0–4	IFK Norrköping	Gothenburg
15:15		Report		Stadium: Gamla Ullevi

===== Knockout stage =====
11 March 2023 Quarter-final	BK Häcken	3–0	IFK Norrköping	Gothenburg
16:00	Gustafson 44' (pen.); Larsen 78'; Sonko 83'	Report		Stadium: Bravida Arena; Attendance: 2,079; Referee: Frederik Klitte

==== 2023–24 ====
24 August 2023 Second Round	Lucksta IF	0–6	IFK Norrköping	Sundsvall
18:00 CEST (UTC+2)		Report	Björk 9', 20'; Sigurgeirsson 72'; Vito 75'; Bolma 82'; Jansson 87'	Stadium: Sörforsvallen; Referee: Römo Mella

== Non competitive ==
=== Pre-season ===
Kickoff times are in UTC+1.

24 November 2022 Friendly	IFK Norrköping	1–0	Motala AIF	Norrköping
19:00	Bolma 40'	Report		Stadium: Nya Parken

28 January 2023 Friendly	IFK Norrköping	0–2	Västerås	Norrköping
15:00		Report	Sandberg 24', 54'	Stadium: Nya Parken

4 February 2023 Friendly	Silkeborg IF	3–2	IFK Norrköping	Silkeborg, Denmark
17:00	Adamsen 14'; Jørgensen 67'; Tengstedt 82'	Report	Guðjohnsen 62', 84'	Stadium: JYSK Park

8 February 2023 Friendly	IFK Norrköping	1–2	Viborg FF	Norrköping
17:00	Lind 19'	Report	Paulinho 48'; Nils Mortimer 83'	Stadium: Nya Parken

18 March 2023 Friendly	IFK Norrköping	0–0	Östersunds FK	Norrköping
16:15		Report		Stadium: Nya Parken

25 March 2023 Friendly	IFK Norrköping	1–2	IF Brommapojkarna	Norrköping
16:00	Sema 59'	Report	Vasic 16'; Fritzson 88'	Stadium: Nya Parken

=== Mid-season ===
26 June 2023 Friendly	IFK Norrköping	1–2	AIK	Norrköping
14:00 UTC+2	Kristoffer Khazeni 9'	Report	Faraj 44'; Hussein 52'	Stadium: Nya Parken

== Season statistics ==
=== Top scorers ===
As of 22 August 2023

Rank	Player				
Rank	Player	2023 Allsvenskan	Svenska Cupen		total
Rank	Player	2023 Allsvenskan	2022–23	2023–24	total
1	(Iceland) Arnór Traustason	8	2	—	10
2	(Sweden) Christoffer Nyman	7	—	—	7
3	(Denmark) Victor Lind	5	1	—	6
4	(Denmark) Vito Hammershøy-Mistrati	4	—	1	5
4	(Iceland) Andri Sigurgeirsson	—	4	1	5
5	(Albania) Laorent Shabani	1	1	—	2
5	(Sweden) Maic Sema	1	1	—	2
6	(Denmark) Marco Lund	1	—	—	1
6	(Sweden) Kristoffer Khazeni	1	—	—	1
6	(Sweden) Jacob Ortmark	—	1	—	1
