= 2019–20 Odense Boldklub season =

Odense Boldklub
2019–20 season
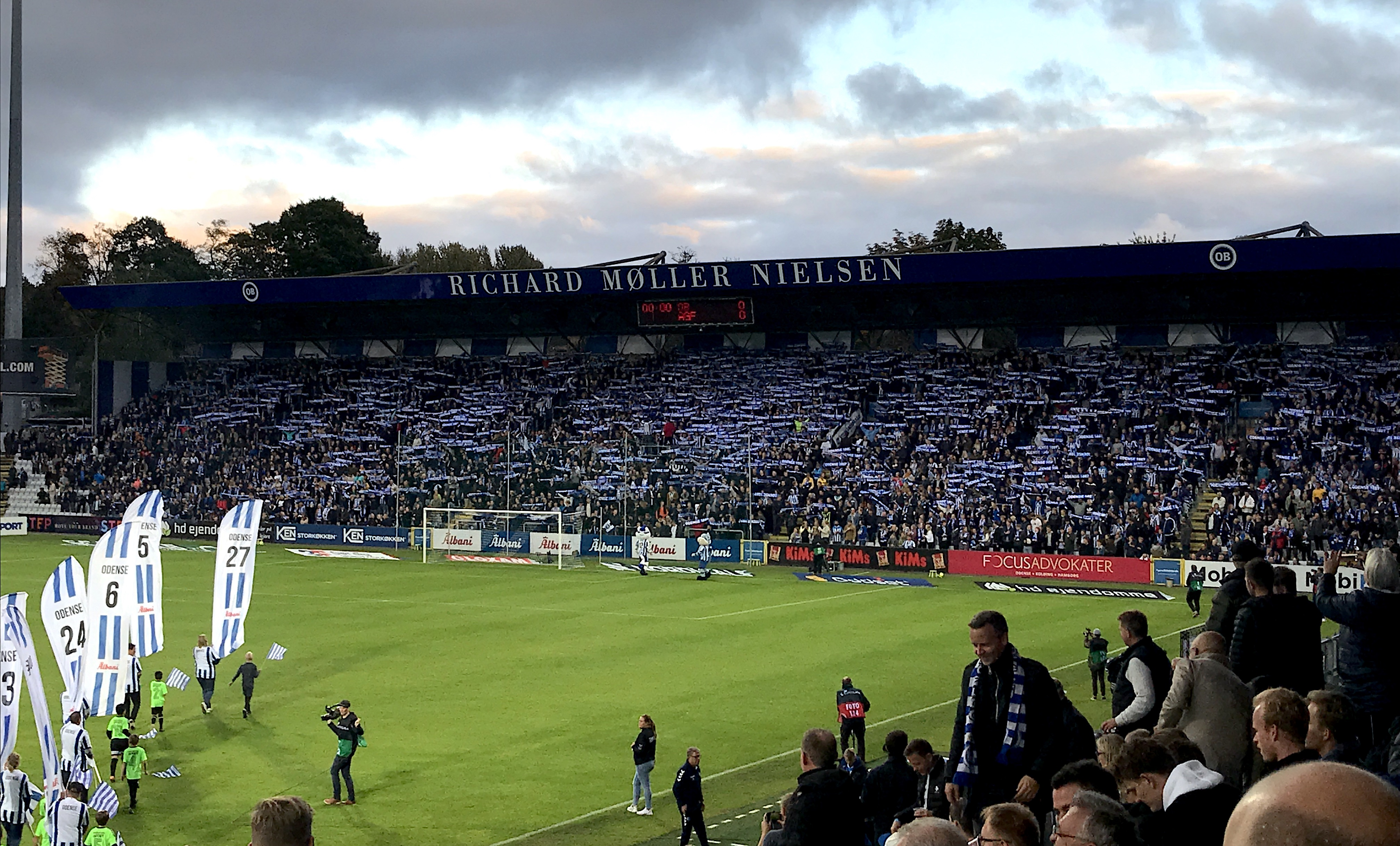
- The Richard Møller Nielsen Stand at the game against Aarhus on 20 September 2019.
- Chairman: Niels Thorborg
- Manager: Jakob Michelsen
- Stadium: Nature Energy Park
- Danish Superliga: 7th
- Danish Cup: Fourth round
- Top goalscorer: League: Sander Svendsen (13 goals); All: Sander Svendsen (14 goals)
Home colours	Away colours

The 2019–20 Odense Boldklub season was the club's 131st season, and their 58th appearance in the Danish Superliga. As well as the Superliga, the side is also competing in Sydbank Pokalen.

They ended up as 7th in the league, and losing the European Play-off final against AGF.

== First team ==
Last updated on 30 June 2020

Squad no.	Name	Nationality	Position	Date of birth (age)
Goalkeepers
13	Hans Christian Bernat	(Denmark)	GK	13 November 2000 (aged 19)
27	Oliver Christensen	(Denmark)	GK	22 March 1999 (aged 21)
30	Sayouba Mandé	(Ivory Coast)	GK	15 June 1993 (aged 27)
Defenders
2	Oliver Lund	(Denmark)	CB/LB/RB	21 August 1990 (aged 29)
3	Alexander Juel Andersen	(Denmark)	CB/RB	29 January 1991 (aged 29)
4	Ryan Johnson Laursen	(Denmark)	RB	14 April 1992 (aged 28)
5	Kasper Larsen	(Denmark)	CB	25 January 1993 (aged 27)
6	Jeppe Tverskov (vice-captain)	(Denmark)	CB	12 March 1993 (aged 27)
16	Jørgen Skjelvik	(Norway)	LB	5 July 1991 (aged 29)
22	Daniel Obbekjær	(Denmark)	CB	16 July 2002 (aged 18)
24	Marco Lund	(Denmark)	CB	30 June 1996 (aged 24)
Midfielders
8	Janus Drachmann (captain)	(Denmark)	CM	11 May 1988 (aged 32)
14	Jens Jakob Thomasen	(Denmark)	CM/AM	25 May 1996 (aged 24)
19	Aron Elís Thrandarson	(Iceland)	AM/CM	10 November 1994 (aged 25)
23	Troels Kløve	(Denmark)	LM/CM	23 October 1990 (aged 29)
25	Moses Opondo	(Uganda)	CM/AM	28 October 1997 (aged 22)
29	Mads Frøkjær-Jensen	(Denmark)	LM/CM	29 July 1999 (aged 21)
Forwards
7	Issam Jebali	(Tunisia)	ST	25 December 1991 (aged 28)
9	Mart Lieder	(Netherlands)	ST	1 May 1990 (aged 30)
10	Sander Svendsen	(Norway)	ST/LW	6 August 1997 (aged 22)
26	Mikkel Hyllegaard	(Denmark)	ST	16 May 1999 (aged 21)

== Transfers and loans ==
=== Transfers in ===
Entry date	Position	No.	Player	From club	Fee	Ref.
1 July 2019	GK	13	(Denmark) Hans Christian Bernat	Youth academy		
1 July 2019	DF	22	(Denmark) Daniel Obbekjær	Youth academy		
1 July 2019	MF	25	(Uganda) Moses Opondo	(Denmark) Vendsyssel	1,000,000 DKK	
16 July 2019	FW	10	(Norway) Sander Svendsen	(Sweden) Hammarby	2,000,000 DKK	
30 July 2019	FW	7	(Tunisia) Issam Jebali	(Saudi Arabia) Al-Wehda	Free transfer	
21 August 2019	DF	18	(Nigeria) Kingsley Madu	(Belgium) Zulte Waregen	Free transfer	
1 January 2020	MF	19	(Iceland) Aron Elís Thrándarson	(Norway) Aalesund	Free transfer	
1 January 2020	FW	26	(Denmark) Mikkel Hyllegaard	(Denmark) SfB/Oure	Free transfer	
7 January 2020	DF	3	(Denmark) Alexander Juel Andersen	(Denmark) Vendsyssel		
18 January 2020	DF	5	(Denmark) Kasper Larsen	(Sweden) Norrköping		
28 January 2020	FW	9	(Netherlands) Mart Lieder	(Denmark) SønderjyskE		
Total					3,000,000 DKK	

=== Transfers out ===
Departure date	Position	No.	Player	To club	Fee	Ref.
30 June 2019	FW	10	(Denmark) Rasmus Festersen	Retired		
30 June 2019	GK	13	(Norway) Sten Grytebust	(Denmark) Copenhagen	End of contract	
30 June 2019	DF	–	(Denmark) Gustav Grubbe	(Germany) Leipzig	3,750,000 DKK	
1 July 2019	MF	7	(Czech Republic) Kamil Vacek	(Czech Republic) Bohemians 1905	Released	
4 July 2019	MF	11	(Denmark) Casper Nielsen	(Belgium) Royale Union SG	4,000,000 DKK	
7 July 2019	FW	15	(Denmark) Nicklas Helenius	(Denmark) Aarhus	500,000 DKK	
14 August 2019	DF	3	(Denmark) Alexander Ludwig	(Denmark) Horsens		
3 January 2020	DF	5	(Netherlands) Ramon Leeuwin	(Netherlands) AZ Alkmaar		
27 January 2020	MF	21	(Denmark) Mathias Greve	(Denmark) Randers		
27 January 2020	FW	9	(Denmark) Bashkim Kadrii	(Saudi Arabia) Al-Fateh	10,000,000 DKK	
28 January 2020	MF	16	(Denmark) Julius Eskesen	(Denmark) SønderjyskE		
28 January 2020	FW	28	(Denmark) Anders K. Jacobsen	(Denmark) SønderjyskE		
22 May 2020	MF	17	(Denmark) Jonathan Harboe		Released	
22 May 2020	DF	18	(Nigeria) Kingsley Madu		Released	
30 June 2020	DF	20	(Denmark) Jacob Barrett Laursen	(Germany) Arminia Bielefeld	End of contract	
Total					18,250,000 DKK	

=== Transfer summary ===
Spending

Summer: ▼3,000,000 DKK

Winter: 0,000,000 DKK

Total: ▼3,000,000 DKK

Income

Summer: ▲8,250,000 DKK

Winter: ▲10,000,000 DKK

Total: ▲18,250,000 DKK

Net Expenditure

Summer: ▲5,250,000 DKK

Winter: ▲10,000,000 DKK

Total: ▲15,250,000 DKK

=== Loans in ===
Start date	End date	Position	No.	Player	To club	Fee	Ref.
2 September 2019	31 December 2019	DF	3	(Denmark) Alexander Juel Andersen	(Denmark) Vendsyssel	None	
31 January 2020	31 December 2020	DF	16	(Norway) Jørgen Skjelvik	(United States) LA Galaxy	None	

=== New contracts ===
Date	Pos	No.	Player	Ref.
9 July 2019	MF	14	(Denmark) Jens Jakob Thomasen	
3 August 2019	DF	6	(Denmark) Jeppe Tverskov	
29 December 2019	GK	13	(Denmark) Hans Christian Bernat	
24 January 2020	MF	29	(Denmark) Mads Frøkjær-Jensen	

== Friendlies ==
=== Pre-season ===
20 June 2019 Friendly	Næsby (Denmark)	0–1	(Denmark) Odense	Odense, Denmark
18:00 CEST		Report	Nielsen 71'	Stadium: Næsby Stadium; Attendance: 571

28 June 2019 Friendly	Odense (Denmark)	0–1	(Denmark) SønderjyskE	Odense, Denmark
14:00 CEST			Rojas 39'	Stadium: Nature Energy Park

3 July 2019 Friendly	Odense (Denmark)	1–1	(Germany) Holstein Kiel	Odense, Denmark
13:00 CEST	Tverskov 29'		Baku 52'	Stadium: Nature Energy Park

6 July 2019 Friendly	Odense (Denmark)	2–0	(Denmark) Roskilde	Odense, Denmark
11:00 CEST	Greve 20'; Jacobsen 62'	Report		Stadium: Ådalen

=== Winter ===
18 January 2020 Friendly	Odense (Denmark)	3–0	(Denmark) Middelfart	Odense, Denmark
10:15 CEST	Svendsen 62'; Jebali 69', 80'	Report		Stadium: Ådalen

22 January 2020 Friendly	Odense (Denmark)	3–1	(Sweden) Helsingborg	Odense, Denmark
15:00 CEST	Frøkjær-Jensen 7'; Juel 9'; Svendsen 56'	Report	Svensson 7'	Stadium: Ådalen

29 January 2020 Friendly	Rapid Wien (Austria)	0–0	(Denmark) Odense	Belek, Turkey
13:00 CEST		Report

3 February 2020 Friendly	Rubin Kazan (Russia)	0–1	(Denmark) Odense	Belek, Turkey
13:00 CEST		Report	Jebali 29'

4 February 2020 Friendly	Odense (Denmark)	1–1	(Serbia) Radnik Surdulica	Belek, Turkey
13:00 CEST	Svendsen 7'	Report	Unknown 16'

8 February 2020 Friendly	Odense (Denmark)	3–0	(Denmark) Horsens	Horsens, Denmark
12:00 CEST	Jebali 12', 14'; Svendsen 62'	Report

=== Post corona ===
22 May 2020 Friendly	Copenhagen (Denmark)	2–2	(Denmark) Odense	Copenhagen, Denmark
13:00 CEST	Daramy 3'; Biel 39'	Report	Opondo 49'; Hansen (Note: Assistant coach Henrik Hansen was specially brought onto the pitch due to many injuries. He ended up scoring the equalizing goal after two minutes on the pitch.) 86'	Stadium: Telia Parken

26 May 2020 Friendly	Odense (Denmark)	3–4	(Denmark) Aalborg	Odense, Denmark
15:00 CEST	Opondo 40'; Tverskov 44'; Svendsen 65'	Report	Klitten 15'; Okore 53'; Pallesen 74' van Weert 79'	Stadium: Nature Energy Park

== Competitions ==
=== Superliga ===
==== League table ====
Pos	Team	Pld	W	D	L	GF	GA	GD	Pts	Qualification
7	Randers	26	10	5	11	39	35	+4	35	Qualification for the Relegation round
8	Horsens	26	10	4	12	25	44	−19	34	Qualification for the Relegation round
9	OB	26	9	6	11	34	30	+4	33	Qualification for the Relegation round
10	Lyngby	26	9	5	12	31	45	−14	32	Qualification for the Relegation round
11	SønderjyskE	26	6	9	11	31	44	−13	27	Qualification for the Relegation round

Source: Danish Football Association (in Danish), Soccerway
Rules for classification: 1) Points; 2) Goal difference; 3) Goals scored; 4) Away goals scored; 5) Play-off (played on neutral ground if determining teams for different rounds); 6) Draw.

==== Results summary ====
Overall								Home						Away					
Pld	W	D	L	GF	GA	GD	Pts	W	D	L	GF	GA	GD	W	D	L	GF	GA	GD
26	9	6	11	34	30	+4	33	6	3	4	21	14	+7	3	3	7	13	16	−3

Last updated: 7 June 2020.

==== Results by round ====
Matchday	1	2	3	4	5	6	7	8	9	10	11	12	13	14	15	16	17	18	19	20	21	22	23	24	25	26
Ground	H	H	A	A	H	A	A	H	A	H	A	H	A	H	H	A	H	A	H	A	H	A	H	A	A	H
Result	L	W	L	W	W	L	D	D	W	L	W	W	L	W	W	L	L	L	D	L	L	D	D	D	L	W
Position	9	5	7	5	4	6	6	7	5	7	5	4	6	4	4	4	6	7	6	9	9	9	9	9	10	9

Updated to match(es) played on 7 June 2020. Source: Superliga
A = Away; H = Home; W = Win; D = Draw; L = Loss

==== Matches ====
14 July 2019 1	Odense	2–3	Copenhagen	Odense
16:00 CEST	Kløve 1', 31'; Tverskov (yellow card) 45'; Kadrii (yellow card) 84'	Report	Wind 42'; N'Doye 48', 70', (yellow card) 58'; Varela (yellow card) 84'	Stadium: Nature Energy Park; Attendance: 9,067; Referee: Michael Tykgaard

22 July 2019 2	Odense	4–1	Lyngby	Odense
19:00 CEST	O. Lund (yellow card) 6'; Kadrii 15' (pen.); Drachmann (yellow card) 42'; Barrett (yellow card) 44'; Svendsen 71', 82'; Kløve 80'; Kadrii (yellow card) 90'	Report	Gytkjær (yellow card) 7', (goal) 34'; Enghardt (yellow card) 52'; Nielsen (yellow card) 63'; Mikkelsen (yellow card) 68'	Stadium: Nature Energy Park; Attendance: 6,339; Referee: Morten Krogh

28 July 2019 3	Brøndby	3–2	Odense	Copenhagen
18:00 CEST	Lindstrøm 25'; Kaiser (yellow card) 59'; Jung (yellow card) 67'; Wilczek 79', 88'	Report	Barrett 35'; Drachmann (yellow card) 47'; Kadrii 67' (pen.); M. Lund (yellow card) 73'	Stadium: Brøndby Stadium; Attendance: 13,689; Referee: Peter Kjærsgaard-Andersen

4 August 2019 4	Esbjerg	0–1	Odense	Esbjerg
14:00 CEST	Yakovenko (yellow card) 21'; Parunashvili (yellow card) 58'; Kauko (yellow card) 58'; Sørensen (yellow card) 59'; Austin (yellow card) 90+4'	Report	Tverskov (yellow card) 53'; M. Lund (yellow card) 55'; Svendsen 68'; Christensen (yellow card) 87'; O. Lund (yellow card) 90+1'	Stadium: Blue Water Arena; Attendance: 4,454; Referee: Benjamin Willaume-Jantzen

9 August 2019 5	Odense	1–0	Randers	Odense
20:00 CEST	Svendsen 50'; Kadrii (yellow card) 65'; Tverskov (yellow card) 73'	Report	Riis (yellow card) 6'	Stadium: Nature Energy Park; Attendance: 6,978; Referee: Jakob Kehlet

16 August 2019 6	Nordsjælland	2–0	Odense	Farum
20:00 CEST	Antwi (yellow card) 2'; Kudus (yellow card) 30'; Thychosen 42'; Larsen (yellow card) 90+2'; Damsgaard 90+3'	Report	Tverskov (yellow card) 45'	Stadium: Right to Dream Park; Attendance: 2,107; Referee: Mikkel Redder

23 August 2019 7	Hobro	0–0	Odense	Hobro
19:00 CEST	Cappis (yellow card) 30'; Babayan (yellow card) 66'; Sabbi (yellow card) 71'	Report	O. Lund (yellow card) 35'; Kadrii (yellow card) 40'; Jebali (yellow card) 62'; Jacobsen (yellow card) 90+1'	Stadium: DS Arena; Attendance: 2,274; Referee: Morten Krogh

30 August 2019 8	Odense	0–0	SønderjyskE	Odense
19:00 CEST	Drachmann (yellow card) 90+5'	Report	Lieder (yellow card) 2'; Absalonsen (yellow card) 22' (yellow-red card) 65'; Banggaard (yellow card) 32'; Mielitz (yellow card) 82'; Albæk (yellow card) 90+2'	Stadium: Nature Energy Park; Attendance: 7,337; Referee: Sandi Putros

16 September 2019 9	Silkeborg	0–3	Odense	Silkeborg
19:00 CEST	Flinta (yellow card) 33'; Crone (yellow card) 41'; Gertsen (yellow card) 59'	Report	O. Lund 15'; Kadrii 28', 76'; M. Lund (yellow card) 33'	Stadium: JYSK Park; Attendance: 3,503; Referee: Benjamin Willaume-Jantzen

20 September 2019 10	Odense	1–2	Aarhus	Odense
19:00 CEST	Opondo 66'	Report	Bundu 28'; Amini 80', (yellow card) 90+5'; Jovanović (yellow card) 88'; Duncan (yellow card) 90'; Backman (yellow card) 90+1'	Stadium: Nature Energy Park; Attendance: 10,441; Referee: Mikkel Redder

29 September 2019 11	Midtjylland	0–1	Odense	Odense
16:00 CEST	Kaba (yellow card) 21'; Brumado (yellow card) 89'	Report	M. Lund (yellow card) 33'; Andersen (yellow card) 53'; Kadrii 60'; Leeuwin (yellow card) 89'	Stadium: MCH Arena; Attendance: 8,618; Referee: Jens Grabski Maae

6 October 2019 12	Odense	3–0	Horsens	Odense
14:00 CEST	Frøkjær-Jensen 12'; Svendsen 39'; Leeuwin (red card) 68'; Jacobsen 86'	Report	Brock-Madsen (yellow card) 67'; Hansson (yellow card) 68'; Okosun (yellow card) 79'	Stadium: Nature Energy Park; Attendance: 6,442; Referee: Peter Kjærsgaard

18 October 2019 13	Aalborg	1–0	Odense	Aalborg
19:00 CEST	Andersen 14' (pen.); Ahlmann (yellow card) 49'; Børsting (yellow card) 86'; Okore (yellow card) 90+3'	Report	Obbekjær (yellow card) 35'; O. Lund (yellow card) 90+7'	Stadium: Aalborg Portland Park; Attendance: 6,086; Referee: Sandi Putros

27 October 2019 14	Odense	3–1	Nordsjælland	Odense
14:00 CEST	Kadrii 9'; Svendsen 33', 63'; Thomasen (yellow card) 41'	Report	Damsgaard (yellow card) 40', (goal) 53'; Thychosen (yellow card) 45'; Antwi (red card) 90'	Stadium: Nature Energy Park; Attendance: 5,915; Referee: Jakob Sundberg

3 November 2019 15	Odense	2–1	Hobro	Odense
14:00 CEST	Kadrii 6'; Svendsen 18'; Leeuwin (yellow card) 30'	Report	Sabbi 31', (yellow card) 90'; Pedersen (yellow card) 45'	Stadium: Nature Energy Park; Attendance: 6,237; Referee: Jørgen Daugbjerg Burchardt

10 November 2019 16	Lyngby	4–3	Odense	Lyngby
14:00 CEST	Geertsen 28'; Riel 37'; Rømer (yellow card) 62'; Corlu 78'; Mikkelsen (yellow card) 84' da Silva 90+3'	Report	Jebali 14'; Thomasen (yellow card) 36'; Kadrii 82'; Greve 85'	Stadium: Lyngby Stadium; Attendance: 4,046; Referee: Aydin Uslu

25 November 2019 17	Odense	1–2	Midtjylland	Odense
19:00 CEST	Kadrii 57'	Report	Evander 24', (yellow card) 90+2'; Onyeka (yellow card) 28'; Mabil 44'; Brumado (yellow card) 90+5'	Stadium: Nature Energy Park; Attendance: 6,392; Referee: Jakob Kehlet

1 December 2019 18	Horsens	2–1	Odense	Horsens
14:00 CEST	Lumb (yellow card) 23'; M. Lund 61' (o.g.); Jacobsen 65'; Nymann (yellow card) 82'; Linnet (yellow card) 88'	Report	Kadrii 23' (pen.); M. Lund (yellow card) 59'	Stadium: CASA Arena Horsens; Attendance: 1,690; Referee: Sandi Putros

9 December 2019 19	Odense	0–0	Aalborg	Odense
19:00 CEST	Greve (yellow card) 29'; O. Lund (yellow card) 58'	Report	van Weert (yellow card) 21'; Olsen (yellow card) 73'; Kusk (yellow card) 77'; Ahlmann (yellow card) 84'; Abildgaard (yellow card) 90+4'	Stadium: Nature Energy Park; Attendance: 5,801; Referee: Mikkel Redder

16 December 2019 20	Copenhagen	2–1	Odense	Copenhagen
19:00 CEST	Santos (yellow card) 77'; Sotiriou 80' (pen.), 82', (yellow card) 90+5'; Nelsson (yellow card) 90+1'; Zeca (yellow card) 90+5'	Report	Jacobsen 7', (yellow card) 65'; Andersen (yellow card) 33'; Thomasen (yellow card) 58'; O. Lund (yellow card) 80'; Drachmann (yellow card) 90+5'	Stadium: Telia Parken; Attendance: 12,226; Referee: Jørgen Daugbjerg Burchardt

16 February 2020 21	Odense	0–2	Brøndby	Odense
18:00 CEST	Frøkjær-Jensen (yellow card) 26'; Jebali (yellow card) 38'; O. Lund (red card) 83'	Report	Jung 8', (yellow card) 76'; Vigen (yellow card) 18', (goal) 60'; Rosted (yellow card) 43'; Skipper (yellow card) 82'	Stadium: Nature Energy Park; Attendance: 9,576; Referee: Michael Tykgaard

23 February 2020 22	Randers	0–0	Odense	Randers
14:00 CEST	Kehinde (yellow card) 62'	Report	Jebali (yellow card) 6'; Laursen (yellow card) 63'	Stadium: Cepheus Park Randers; Attendance: 3,103; Referee: Aydin Uslu

1 March 2020 23	Odense	1–1	Silkeborg	Odense
14:00 CEST	Svendsen 35' (pen.); Kløve (yellow card) 84'; Barrett (yellow card) 90+2'	Report	Kaalund (yellow card) 8'; Romo (yellow card) 35'; Okkels 72'	Stadium: Nature Energy Park; Attendance: 4,864; Referee: Sandi Putros

8 March 2020 24	SønderjyskE	1–1	Odense	Haderslev
14:00 CEST	Kanstrup (yellow card) 3'; Bah (yellow card) 40'; Jónsson (yellow card) 60'; Absalonsen 88' (pen.)	Report	Tverskov (yellow card) 8'; Jebali 38' (pen.); Lieder (yellow card) 82'; Christensen (yellow card) 87'	Stadium: Sydbank Park; Attendance: 0 Referee: Anders Poulsen

1 June 2020 25	Aarhus	1–0	Odense	Aarhus
20:00 CEST	Thorsteinsson (yellow card) 15'; Poulsen (yellow card) 27'; Helenius 78'; Højer Nielsen (yellow card) 90+2'	Report	O. Lund (yellow card) 60'	Stadium: Ceres Park; Attendance: 0 Referee: Jørgen Daugbjerg Burchardt

7 June 2020 26	Odense	3–1	Esbjerg	Odense
17:00 CEST	Laursen 23', (yellow card) 58'; Svendsen 31'; Thrándarson 44'; Frøkjær-Jensen (yellow card) 56'	Report	Austin (yellow card) 77'; Larsen 84'	Stadium: Nature Energy Park; Attendance: 0 Referee: Benjamin Willaume-Jantzen

==== Relegation round ====
Pos	Team	Pld	W	D	L	GF	GA	GD	Pts	Qualification or relegation	ODE	SON	LYN	SIL
1	OB	32	12	7	13	43	42	+1	43	Qualification for the European play-offs	—	2–0	3–1	1–3
2	SønderjyskE	32	9	11	12	37	49	−12	38	Qualification for the Europa League third qualifying round (Note: SønderjyskE qualified for the Europa League third qualifying round by winning the 2019–20 Danish Cup.)	1–1	—	1–0	1–0
3	Lyngby (O)	32	9	7	16	34	54	−20	34	Qualification for the relegation play-offs	1–2	1–1	—	0–0
4	Silkeborg (R)	32	6	8	18	43	59	−16	26	Relegation to 2020–21 Danish 1st Division	6–0	1–2	2–0	—

Source: Soccerway
Legend: Blue = home team win; Yellow = draw; Red = away team win.
Rules for classification: 1) Points; 2) Goal difference; 3) Goals scored; 4) Away goals scored; 5) Play-off.
(O) Play-off winners; (R) Relegated
Notes:

15 June 2020 27	Silkeborg	6–0	Odense	Silkeborg
19:00 CEST	Luijckx (yellow card) 16'; Laursen 25' (o.g.); Vallys 28'; Moberg (yellow card) 33'; Brumado (yellow card) 34', (goal) 46'; Madsen 52'; Holten 73'; Lind 76'	Report	Svendsen (yellow card) 24'	Stadium: JYSK Park; Attendance: 294; Referee: Jakob Sundberg

18 June 2020 28	Odense	2–0	SønderjyskE	Odense
18:00 CEST	Tverskov 16' (pen.); Kløve 32'	Report	Gartenmann (yellow card) 15'; Absalonsen (yellow card) 44'	Stadium: Nature Energy Park; Attendance: 300; Referee: Jørgen Daugbjerg Burchardt

22 June 2020 29	Lyngby	1–2	Odense	Lyngby
19:00 CEST	Corlu 12'	Report	Kløve 41'; Laursen (yellow card) 42'; Klynge (yellow card) 47'; Svendsen 58'; Skjelvik (yellow card) 63'	Stadium: Lyngby Stadium; Attendance: 875; Referee: Anders Poulsen

29 June 2020 30	Odense	3–1	Lyngby	Odense
19:00 CEST	Opondo (yellow card) 19'; Svendsen 59' (pen.); Frøkjær-Jensen 84'; Kløve (yellow card) 89'; Jebali 90+3'	Report	Gytkjær (yellow card) 15'; Gregor (yellow card) 26'; Enghardt 36'; Corly (yellow card) 45+1'; Laursen (red card) 59'	Stadium: Nature Energy Park; Attendance: 300; Referee: Sandi Putros

4 July 2020 31	SønderjyskE	1–1	Odense	Haderslev
18:00 CEST	Ekani (yellow card) 57'; Bah (yellow card) 70', (goal) 77'; Jónsson (yellow card) 80'	Report	Thomasen (yellow card) 18'; Laursen (yellow card) 34'; Jebali (yellow card) 36'; M. Lund (yellow card) 70'; Hyllegaard 80'; Frøkjær-Jensen (yellow card) 87'	Stadium: Sydbank Park; Attendance: 1,500; Referee: Jakob Sundberg

8 July 2020 32	Odense	1–3	Silkeborg	Odense
20:00 CEST	Harboe (yellow card) 46'; O. Lund (yellow card) 50'; Hyllegaard 55'; Nissen (yellow card) 59'	Report	Holten 12', 26'; Okkels (yellow card) 71'; Lesniak (yellow card) 86'; Lind (yellow card) 90', (goal) 90+3'	Stadium: Nature Energy Park; Referee: Michael Tykgaard

=== European play-offs ===
==== Quarter-finals ====
11 July 2020 First leg	Randers	2–1	Odense	Randers
18:00 CEST	Kamara 65'; Riis 74'	Report	Fenger 19'; Opondo (yellow card) 44'; O. Lund (yellow card) 74'	Stadium: Cepheus Park Randers; Attendance: 1,231; Referee: Jens Maae

19 July 2020 Second leg	Odense	2–0	Randers	Odense
16:00 CEST	Fenger 29', 61'; Kløve (yellow card) 90+1'	Report	Hammershøy-Mistrati (yellow card) 9'; Egho (yellow card) 74'; Rømer (yellow card) 80'	Stadium: Nature Energy Park; Attendance: 3,621; Referee: Jakob Kehlet

Odense won 4–2 on aggregate.

==== Semi-finals ====
23 July 2020 First leg	Odense	3–1	Horsens	Odense
18:00 CEST	M. Lund (yellow card) 8'; Fenger 21'; Larsen (yellow card) 41'; Svendsen 78' (pen.); Hyllegaard 86'	Report	Hansson (yellow card) 34'; Jacobsen (yellow card) 43'; Okosun 63'; Prip (yellow card) 77'	Stadium: Nature Energy Park; Attendance: 3,884; Referee: Mads-Kristoffer Kristoffersen

26 July 2020 Second leg	Horsens	1–1	Odense	Horsens
14:00 CEST	Gemmer (yellow card) 34'; Prip (yellow card) 38'; Kiilerich 61'; Thorsen (yellow card) 73'; Gomez (yellow card) 90+5'	Report	Frøkjær-Jensen (yellow card) 12'; Skjelvik (yellow card) 44'; Kløve (yellow card) 45+4'; Hyllegaard 78'	Stadium: CASA Arena Horsens; Attendance: 2,171; Referee: Michael Tykgaard

Odense won 4-2 on aggregate

=== Final ===
29 July 2020 Final	Aarhus	2–1	Odense	Aarhus
20:00 CEST	Diks (yellow card) 18'; Blume 45'; Mortensen 47'; Munksgaard (yellow card) 52'; Ankersen (yellow card) 63'; Thorsteinsson (yellow card) 90'; Eskelinen (yellow card) 90+5'	Report	Jebali (yellow card) 16'; M. Lund (yellow card) 22'; Larsen 56'; Tverskov (yellow card) 90'	Stadium: Ceres Park; Attendance: 8,247; Referee: Morten Krogh

=== Sydbank Pokalen ===
24 September 2019 Third round	Otterup	0–2	Odense	Otterup
16:30 CEST	Tubæk (yellow card) 79'	Report	Greve 5'; Svendsen 78'	Stadium: Otterup Stadion; Attendance: 2,050; Referee: Jørgen Daugbjerg Burchardt

31 October 2019 Fourth round	Aarhus	1–0	Odense	Aarhus
20:15 CEST	Munksgaard (yellow card) 20'; Ankersen 86'; Helenius (yellow card) 90+2'	Report		Stadium: Ceres Park; Attendance: 3,160; Referee: Sandi Putros

== Squad statistics ==
=== Goalscorers ===
Includes all competitive matches. The list is sorted by shirt number when total goals are equal.

As of match played 29 July 2020

Rank	Pos.	No.	Player	Superliga	Sydbank Pokalen	Total
1	FW	10	Sander Svendsen	13	1	14
2	FW	—	Bashkim Kadrii	10	0	10
3	FW	15	Max Fenger	4	0	4
3	MF	23	Troels Kløve	4	0	4
3	FW	26	Mikkel Hyllegaard	4	0	4
6	FW	7	Issam Jebali	3	0	3
7	MF	29	Mads Frøkjær-Jensen	2	0	2
7	MF	—	Mathias Greve	1	1	2
7	FW	—	Anders K. Jacobsen	2	0	2
10	DF	2	Oliver Lund	1	0	1
10	DF	4	Ryan Laursen	1	0	1
10	DF	5	Kasper Larsen	1	0	1
10	DF	6	Jeppe Tverskov	1	0	1
10	MF	19	Aron Elís Thrándarson	1	0	1
10	MF	25	Moses Opondo	1	0	1
10	DF	—	Jacob Barrett Laursen	1	0	1
Own goals				0	0	0
TOTALS				51	2	53

=== Disciplinary record ===
As of match played 29 July 2020

No.	Pos.	Name	Superliga		Sydbank Pokalen		Total	
No.	Pos.	Name	Booked	Sent off (straight red)	Booked	Sent off (straight red)	Booked	Sent off (straight red)
2	DF	(Denmark) Oliver Lund	9	1	0	0	9	1
24	DF	(Denmark) Marco Lund	8	0	0	0	8	0
6	DF	(Denmark) Jeppe Tverskov	5	0	0	0	5	0
7	FW	(Tunisia) Issam Jebali	5	0	0	0	5	0
4	DF	(Denmark) Ryan Laursen	4	0	0	0	4	0
8	MF	(Denmark) Janus Drachmann	4	0	0	0	4	0
14	MF	(Denmark) Jens Jakob Thomasen	4	0	0	0	4	0
23	MF	(Denmark) Troels Kløve	4	0	0	0	4	0
29	MF	(Denmark) Mads Frøkjær-Jensen	4	0	0	0	4	0
—	FW	(Denmark) Bashkim Kadrii	4	0	0	0	4	0
—	DF	(Netherlands) Ramon Leeuwin	2	1	0	0	2	1
3	DF	(Denmark) Alexander Juel Andersen	2	0	0	0	2	0
16	DF	(Norway) Jørgen Skjelvik	2	0	0	0	2	0
25	DF	(Uganda) Moses Opondo	2	0	0	0	2	0
27	GK	(Denmark) Oliver Christensen	2	0	0	0	2	0
—	FW	(Denmark) Anders K. Jacobsen	2	0	0	0	2	0
—	DF	(Denmark) Jacob Barrett Laursen	2	0	0	0	2	0
5	DF	(Denmark) Kasper Larsen	1	0	0	0	1	0
9	FW	(Netherlands) Mart Lieder	1	0	0	0	1	0
10	FW	(Norway) Sander Svendsen	1	0	0	0	1	0
17	MF	(Denmark) Jonathan Harboe	1	0	0	0	1	0
22	DF	(Denmark) Daniel Obbekjær	1	0	0	0	1	0
43	MF	(Denmark) Anders Klynge	1	0	0	0	1	0
45	MF	(Denmark) Rasmus Nissen	1	0	0	0	1	0
Total			73	2	0	0	73	2
