= 2024 IFK Norrköping season =

Swedish Football Season Article

IFK Norrköping
2024 season
- Chairman: Sakarias Mårdh
- Head coach: Andreas Alm
- Stadium: Nya Parken
Home colours	Away colours	Third colours

The 2024 season is IFK Norrköping's 84th season in Allsvenskan and their 13th consecutive season in the league. They compete in Allsvenskan and Svenska Cupen. League play started on March 30, with a home match, known as "The Working Class Derby", against Malmö, and will end on November 10, against Djurgården at Stockholm.

== Players ==
=== First-team squad ===
As of 28 February 2024

Note: Flags indicate national team as defined under FIFA eligibility rules; some limited exceptions apply. Players may hold more than one non-FIFA nationality.

No.	Pos.	Nation	Player
1	GK	SWE	Oscar Jansson
3	DF	DEN	Marcus Baggesen
4	DF	SWE	Amadeus Sögaard
5	FW	SWE	Christoffer Nyman
6	DF	SWE	Isak Ssewankambo
7	MF	SWE	Jacob Ortmark
8	FW	ISL	Ísak Andri Sigurgeirsson
9	MF	ISL	Arnór Ingvi Traustason
10	MF	DEN	Vito Hammershøy-Mistrati
11	MF	KOS	Ismet Lushaku
14	DF	SWE	Yahya Kalley (on loan from Groningen)
15	FW	SWE	Carl Björk (on loan from Brøndby)
16	DF	SWE	Dino Salihovic
17	FW	ALB	Laorent Shabani
19	DF	SWE	Max Watson
20	DF	NOR	Daniel Eid

No.	Pos.	Nation	Player
21	MF	GAM	Jesper Ceesay
24	DF	SWE	Anton Eriksson
25	DF	SWE	Kevin Höög Jansson
26	MF	SWE	Kristoffer Khazeni
27	MF	SWE	Daniele Burubwa
28	MF	SWE	Fritiof Hellichius
31	FW	SWE	Leo Jonsson
34	MF	SWE	Noel Sernelius
35	MF	GHA	Stephen Bolma
37	DF	SWE	Moutaz Neffati
38	MF	SWE	Ture Sandberg
40	GK	SWE	David Andersson
—	FW	SWE	Tim Prica
—	DF	SWE	Edvin Tellgren
—	DF	SWE	Jesper Lindvall

=== Out on loan ===
As of 9 January 2024

Note: Flags indicate national team as defined under FIFA eligibility rules; some limited exceptions apply. Players may hold more than one non-FIFA nationality.

No.	Pos.	Nation	Player
22	FW	ISL	Andri Guðjohnsen (to Lyngby until 30 June 2024)
29	GK	SWE	Julius Lindgren (to J-Södra until 31 December 2024)

No.	Pos.	Nation	Player
37	MF	GHA	Kojo Peprah Oppong (to GIF Sundsvall until 31 December 2024)
—	GK	SWE	Otto Lindell (to Skövde AIK until 31 December 2024)

== Competitions ==
=== Allsvenskan ===
==== League table ====
Pos	Team	Pld	W	D	L	GF	GA	GD	Pts
9	IK Sirius	30	12	5	13	47	46	+1	41
10	IF Brommapojkarna	30	8	10	12	46	53	−7	34
11	IFK Norrköping	30	9	7	14	36	57	−21	34
12	Halmstads BK	30	10	3	17	32	50	−18	33
13	IFK Göteborg	30	7	10	13	33	43	−10	31

Source: svenskfotboll.se (in Swedish)
Rules for classification: 1) Points; 2) Goal difference; 3) Goals scored; 4) Head-to-head points; 5) Head-to-head goal difference; 6) Head-to-head away goals scored; 7) Play-off
(Note: Play-off is only played if need to decide champion, teams for relegation or UEFA competition and will be played on a neutral ground).

==== Results summary ====
Overall								Home						Away					
Pld	W	D	L	GF	GA	GD	Pts	W	D	L	GF	GA	GD	W	D	L	GF	GA	GD
3	1	0	2	2	8	−6	3	1	0	1	2	5	−3	0	0	1	0	3	−3

Source: soccerway
