= 2019–20 Danish Superliga =

30th season of Danish Superliga

Superliga
- Season: 2019–20
- Dates: 12 July 2019 – 12 March 2020, 29 May – 29 July 2020
- Champions: Midtjylland
- Relegated: Silkeborg IF; Esbjerg fB; Hobro IK
- Champions League: Midtjylland
- Europa League: AGF; Copenhagen; SønderjyskE
- Matches: 140
- Goals: 399 (2.85 per match)
- Top goalscorer: Ronnie Schwartz (18)
- Biggest home win: Silkeborg 6–0 Odense (15 June 2020)
- Biggest away win: Horsens 0–5 AaB (26 August 2019)
- Highest scoring: AGF 3–4 Silkeborg (20 October 2019); Brøndby 5–2 Randers (27 October); Lyngby 4–3 Odense (10 November 2019)
- Longest winning run: Midtjylland (8) (6 October 2019 – 8 December 2019)
- Longest unbeaten run: Midtjylland (10) (12 July 2019 – 22 September 2019)
- Longest winless run: Silkeborg (12) (14 July 2019 – 6 October 2019)
- Longest losing run: Silkeborg (5) (1 September 2019 – 6 October 2019)
- Highest attendance: 29,310; Copenhagen 2–1 Brøndby (1 December 2019)
- Lowest attendance: 1,234; Horsens 2–1 Lyngby (1 September 2019)
- Average attendance: 6,629
- All statistics correct as of 29 July 2020.

The 2019–20 Danish Superliga (officially the 3F Superliga for sponsorship reasons) was the 30th season of the Danish Superliga. F.C. Copenhagen were the defending champions. The season started on 12 July 2019 and was scheduled to end in May 2020, before being suspended due to the COVID-19 pandemic. The season instead ended on 29 July 2020.

== Teams ==
Vejle Boldklub finished as loser in the relegation play-offs in the 2018–19 season and was relegated to the 2019–20 1st Division along with Vendsyssel FF who lost their relegation play-offs as well.

The relegated teams were replaced by 2018–19 1st Division champions Silkeborg IF, who returned after one year of absence, as well as the play-off winners Lyngby Boldklub who also returned after a one-year absence.

=== Stadia and locations ===
Locations of the Danish Superliga 2019–20 teams

Club	Location	Stadium	Turf	Capacity	2018–19 position
AaB	Aalborg	Aalborg Portland Park	Hybrid	13,797	9th
AGF	Aarhus	Ceres Park	Hybrid	20,032	8th
Brøndby	Brøndby	Brøndby Stadium	Hybrid	29,000	4th
Copenhagen	Copenhagen	Telia Parken	Hybrid	38,065	1st
Esbjerg	Esbjerg	Blue Water Arena	Natural	18,000	3rd
Hobro	Hobro	DS Arena	Natural	10,700	13th
Horsens	Horsens	CASA Arena Horsens	Natural	10,400	11th
Lyngby	Lyngby	Lyngby Stadion	Natural	8,000	1D, 3rd
Midtjylland	Herning	MCH Arena	Natural	11,800	2nd
Nordsjælland	Farum	Right to Dream Park	Artificial	9,900	6th
OB	Odense	Nature Energy Park	Natural	15,633	5th
Randers	Randers	BioNutria Park Randers	Natural	12,000	7th
Silkeborg	Silkeborg	JYSK Park	Artificial	10,000	1D, 1st
SønderjyskE	Haderslev	Sydbank Park	Natural	10,000	10th

=== Personnel and sponsoring ===
Note: Flags indicate national team as has been defined under FIFA eligibility rules. Players and Managers may hold more than one non-FIFA nationality.

Team	Head coach	Captain	Kit manufacturer	Shirt sponsor
AaB	(Denmark) Jacob Friis	(Denmark) Lucas Andersen	Hummel	Spar Nord
AGF	(Denmark) David Nielsen	(Sweden) Niklas Backman	Hummel	Ceres
Brøndby	(Denmark) Niels Frederiksen	(Denmark) Andreas Maxsø	Hummel	Arbejdernes Landsbank
Copenhagen	(Norway) Ståle Solbakken	(Greece) Zeca	Adidas	Carlsberg
Esbjerg	(Denmark) Troels Bech	(Finland) Markus Halsti	Nike	Viking
Hobro	(Denmark) Peter Sørensen	(Denmark) Jonas Damborg	Puma	DS Gruppen, Spar Nord
Horsens	(Denmark) Bo Henriksen	(Faroe Islands) Hallur Hansson	Hummel	NG Zink
Lyngby	(Denmark) Christian Nielsen	(Denmark) Martin Ørnskov	Adidas	Jönsson A/S
Midtjylland	(Denmark) Brian Priske	(Denmark) Erik Sviatchenko	Nike	Det Faglige Hus
Nordsjælland	(Denmark) Flemming Pedersen	(Denmark) Nicolai Larsen	Nike	DHL
OB	(Denmark) Jakob Michelsen	(Denmark) Janus Drachmann	Hummel	Albani
Randers	(Denmark) Thomas Thomasberg	(Denmark) Erik Marxen	Puma	Verdo
Silkeborg	(Denmark) Kent Nielsen	(Denmark) Mads Emil Madsen	Uhlsport	Mascot International
SønderjyskE	(Denmark) Glen Riddersholm	(Denmark) Marc Pedersen	Hummel	Frøs Herreds Sparekasse

=== Managerial changes ===
Team	Outgoing manager	Manner of departure	Date of vacancy	Replaced by	Date of appointment	Position in table
Silkeborg IF	(Denmark) Michael Hansen	End of contract	30 May 2019	(Denmark) Kent Nielsen	1 June 2019	Pre-season
Brøndby IF	(Denmark) Martin Retov	End of tenure as caretaker	30 June 2019	(Denmark) Niels Frederiksen	1 July 2019	Pre-season
FC Midtjylland	(Denmark) Kenneth Andersen	Resigned	19 August 2019	(Denmark) Brian Priske	19 August 2019	2nd
Esbjerg	(Netherlands) John Lammers	Sacked	16 September 2019	(Denmark) Lars Olsen	28 October 2019	13th
Esbjerg	(Denmark) Lars Olsen	Sacked	9 June 2020	(Denmark) Troels Bech	10 June 2020	13th

== Regular season ==
=== League table ===
Pos	Team	Pld	W	D	L	GF	GA	GD	Pts	Qualification
1	Midtjylland	26	21	2	3	42	14	+28	65	Qualification for the Championship round
2	Copenhagen	26	18	2	6	47	29	+18	56	Qualification for the Championship round
3	AGF	26	14	5	7	42	28	+14	47	Qualification for the Championship round
4	Brøndby	26	13	3	10	47	37	+10	42	Qualification for the Championship round
5	Nordsjælland	26	12	5	9	48	35	+13	41	Qualification for the Championship round
6	AaB	26	11	5	10	44	33	+11	38	Qualification for the Championship round
7	Randers	26	10	5	11	39	35	+4	35	Qualification for the Relegation round
8	Horsens	26	10	4	12	25	44	−19	34	Qualification for the Relegation round
9	OB	26	9	6	11	34	30	+4	33	Qualification for the Relegation round
10	Lyngby	26	9	5	12	31	45	−14	32	Qualification for the Relegation round
11	SønderjyskE	26	6	9	11	31	44	−13	27	Qualification for the Relegation round
12	Hobro	26	3	14	9	25	35	−10	23	Qualification for the Relegation round
13	Esbjerg	26	4	6	16	22	44	−22	18	Qualification for the Relegation round
14	Silkeborg	26	3	7	16	31	55	−24	16	Qualification for the Relegation round

Source: Danish Football Association (in Danish), Soccerway
Rules for classification: 1) Points; 2) Goal difference; 3) Goals scored; 4) Away goals scored; 5) Play-off (played on neutral ground if determining teams for different rounds); 6) Draw.

=== Positions by round ===
Team ╲ Round	1	2	3	4	5	6	7	8	9	10	11	12	13	14	15	16	17	18	19	20	21	22	23	24	25	26
Midtjylland	6	2	2	2	2	2	2	1	1	1	1	1	1	1	1	1	1	1	1	1	1	1	1	1	1	1
Copenhagen	4	1	1	1	1	1	1	2	2	2	2	2	2	2	2	2	2	2	2	2	2	2	2	2	2	2
AGF	7	11	12	12	12	12	9	6	4	3	3	5	5	6	5	5	4	3	3	3	3	3	3	3	3	3
Brøndby	1	3	3	3	3	3	3	5	3	5	6	6	3	3	3	3	3	4	4	4	4	4	4	4	4	4
Nordsjælland	2	6	5	6	7	4	5	4	7	4	7	8	7	8	8	9	7	8	8	7	5	5	5	5	5	5
AaB	12	13	6	11	6	7	4	3	6	8	10	9	8	5	7	7	5	5	5	6	6	6	6	6	6	6
Randers	10	10	11	10	11	11	12	11	8	6	4	3	4	7	6	6	8	6	7	5	7	7	7	7	7	7
Horsens	13	7	9	8	9	9	11	10	11	12	12	12	11	11	11	11	11	10	11	10	11	11	11	10	9	8
OB	9	5	7	5	4	6	6	7	5	7	5	4	6	4	4	4	6	7	6	9	9	9	9	9	10	9
Lyngby	3	8	10	9	10	10	8	9	12	11	9	10	10	9	9	8	9	9	9	8	8	8	8	8	8	10
SønderjyskE	5	4	4	4	5	5	7	8	9	9	8	7	9	10	10	10	10	11	10	11	10	10	10	11	11	11
Hobro	8	9	8	7	8	8	10	12	10	10	11	11	12	12	12	12	12	12	12	12	12	12	12	12	12	12
Esbjerg	11	12	13	13	13	13	13	13	13	13	13	13	13	13	13	13	13	13	13	13	13	13	13	13	13	13
Silkeborg	14	14	14	14	14	14	14	14	14	14	14	14	14	14	14	14	14	14	14	14	14	14	14	14	14	14

Source: Weltfussball

=== Results ===
Home \ Away	AAB	AGF	BRO	COP	ESB	HOB	HOR	LYN	MID	NOR	ODE	RAN	SIL	SON
Aalborg	—	2–3	3–2	1–0	4–0	1–1	4–0	3–0	0–1	1–3	1–0	0–3	3–1	1–1
Aarhus	3–0	—	2–1	1–2	1–0	0–0	2–0	1–1	0–1	3–1	1–0	1–1	3–4	4–2
Brøndby	2–1	0–3	—	3–1	2–1	1–1	1–2	1–0	1–2	4–2	3–2	5–2	3–0	1–0
Copenhagen	3–2	2–1	2–1	—	3–1	2–1	0–1	2–0	0–0	3–1	2–1	2–1	4–2	3–0
Esbjerg	1–1	1–2	3–1	1–0	—	1–1	1–1	1–0	1–2	1–2	0–1	0–3	2–2	1–2
Hobro	0–2	1–1	0–2	2–1	1–1	—	0–0	3–2	0–2	2–2	0–0	2–2	1–1	1–1
Horsens	0–5	1–2	2–2	0–2	1–1	1–0	—	2–1	0–2	0–3	2–1	1–2	2–1	2–1
Lyngby	2–0	2–1	0–3	1–4	2–0	2–1	2–1	—	0–3	1–1	4–3	2–0	1–0	0–3
Midtjylland	1–0	1–3	1–0	4–1	1–0	1–1	0–1	2–0	—	2–1	0–1	2–1	2–1	3–0
Nordsjælland	2–1	0–1	2–2	0–1	2–0	2–1	6–0	1–1	0–1	—	2–0	3–0	2–2	2–1
OB	0–0	1–2	0–2	2–3	3–1	2–1	3–0	4–1	1–2	3–1	—	1–0	1–1	0–0
Randers	3–3	2–0	2–2	0–1	3–0	0–1	2–1	2–1	0–2	3–1	0–0	—	2–0	3–0
Silkeborg	0–2	2–1	0–1	1–1	1–2	2–3	0–3	2–3	1–2	0–2	0–3	2–1	—	3–3
SønderjyskE	1–3	0–0	2–1	1–2	2–1	3–1	0–0	2–2	0–2	1–4	1–1	2–1	2–2	—

Source: soccerway.com
Legend: Blue = home team win; Yellow = draw; Red = away team win.

== Championship round ==
Points and goals will carry over in full from the regular season.

Pos	Team	Pld	W	D	L	GF	GA	GD	Pts	Qualification	MID	COP	AGF	BRO	AaB	NOR
1	Midtjylland (C)	36	26	4	6	61	29	+32	82	Qualification for the Champions League second qualifying round	—	3–1	3–4	0–0	1–2	6–3
2	Copenhagen	36	21	5	10	58	42	+16	68	Qualification for the Europa League second qualifying round	1–2	—	2–4	0–0	2–0	2–1
3	AGF (O)	36	19	7	10	58	41	+17	64	Qualification for the European play-off match	3–0	1–0	—	0–1	1–4	2–1
4	Brøndby	36	16	8	12	56	42	+14	56		1–1	1–1	0–0	—	0–1	4–0
5	AaB	36	16	6	14	54	44	+10	54		0–2	0–1	1–0	2–0	—	0–4
6	Nordsjælland	36	13	8	15	59	54	+5	47		0–1	1–1	1–1	0–2	0–0	—

Source: Danish Football Association (in Danish), Soccerway
Legend: Blue = home team win; Yellow = draw; Red = away team win.
(C) Champions; (O) Play-off winners

=== Positions by round ===
Below the positions per round are shown. As teams did not all start with an equal number of points, the initial pre-playoffs positions are also given.

Team ╲ Round	26	27	28	29	30	31	32	33	34	35	36
Midtjylland	1	1	1	1	1	1	1	1	1	1	1
Copenhagen	2	2	2	2	2	2	2	2	3	2	2
AGF	3	3	3	3	3	3	3	3	2	3	3
Brøndby	4	4	4	4	4	4	4	4	4	4	4
AaB	6	6	6	6	6	6	5	5	5	5	5
Nordsjælland	5	5	5	5	5	5	6	6	6	6	6

Updated to match(es) played on 26 July 2020. Source:

== Relegation round ==
Points and goals will carry over in full from the regular season. Starting next season in the Superliga there will again be only 12 clubs.

=== Group A ===
Pos	Team	Pld	W	D	L	GF	GA	GD	Pts	Qualification or relegation	ODE	SON	LYN	SIL
1	OB	32	12	7	13	43	42	+1	43	Qualification for the European play-offs	—	2–0	3–1	1–3
2	SønderjyskE	32	9	11	12	37	49	−12	38	Qualification for the Europa League third qualifying round (Note: SønderjyskE qualified for the Europa League third qualifying round by winning the 2019–20 Danish Cup.)	1–1	—	1–0	1–0
3	Lyngby (O)	32	9	7	16	34	54	−20	34	Qualification for the relegation play-offs	1–2	1–1	—	0–0
4	Silkeborg (R)	32	6	8	18	43	59	−16	26	Relegation to 2020–21 Danish 1st Division	6–0	1–2	2–0	—

Source: Soccerway
Legend: Blue = home team win; Yellow = draw; Red = away team win.
Rules for classification: 1) Points; 2) Goal difference; 3) Goals scored; 4) Away goals scored; 5) Play-off.
(O) Play-off winners; (R) Relegated

=== Positions by round ===
Below the positions per round are shown. As teams did not all start with an equal number of points, the initial pre-playoffs positions are also given.

Team ╲ Round	Initial	27	28	29	30	31	32
OB	1	1	1	1	1	1	1
SønderjyskE	3	3	3	2	2	2	2
Lyngby	2	2	2	3	3	3	3
Silkeborg	4	4	4	4	4	4	4

Updated to match(es) played on 27 June 2020. Source:

=== Group B ===
Pos	Team	Pld	W	D	L	GF	GA	GD	Pts	Qualification or relegation	HOR	RAN	HOB	ESB
1	Horsens	32	13	7	12	36	50	−14	46	Qualification for the European play-offs	—	0–0	3–2	2–2
2	Randers	32	13	6	13	51	45	+6	45	Qualification for the European play-offs	0–3	—	4–0	3–1
3	Hobro (R)	32	5	15	12	35	48	−13	30	Qualification for the relegation play-offs	1–1	2–3	—	2–1
4	Esbjerg (R)	32	5	7	20	32	58	−26	22	Relegation to 2020–21 Danish 1st Division	1–2	4–2	1–3	—

Source: Soccerway
Legend: Blue = home team win; Yellow = draw; Red = away team win.
Rules for classification: 1) Points; 2) Goal difference; 3) Goals scored; 4) Away goals scored; 5) Play-off.
(R) Relegated

=== Positions by round ===
Below the positions per round are shown. As teams did not all start with an equal number of points, the initial pre-playoffs positions are also given.

Team ╲ Round	Initial	27	28	29	30	31	32
Horsens	2	2	2	2	1	1	1
Randers	1	1	1	1	2	2	2
Hobro	3	3	3	3	3	3	3
Esbjerg	4	4	4	4	4	4	4

== European play-offs ==
The winning team from the 4-team knockout tournament advanced to a Europa League play-off match. In the final, the team with the most points from the relegation round group stage would host the second leg.

The match between Horsens and SønderjyskE was cancelled due to the latter's victory in the Danish Cup, which automatically qualified the team for Europa League and allowed Horsens to advance directly to the second round.

Quarter-finals
11 and 19 July 2020
OB	1	2	3
Randers	2	0	2

Semi-finals
23 and 26 July 2020
OB	3	1	4
Horsens	1	1	2

Play-off
29 July 2020
AGF	2
OB	1

=== Quarter-finals ===
11 July 2020	Randers	2–1	OB	Cepheus Park Randers, Randers
18:00	Kamara 65' (Hammershøy-Mistrati); Riis 74' (Kopplin)	OB Report	Fenger 19' (Opondo); Opondo (yellow card) 44'	Attendance: 1,231; Referee: Jens Maae

19 July 2020	OB	2–0 (3–2 agg.)	Randers	Nature Energy Park, Odense
18:00	Fenger 29' (Thomasen) 61' (Skjelvik); Kløve (yellow card) 90+1'	OB Report	Hammershøy-Mistrati (yellow card) 9'; Egho (yellow card) 74'; Rømer (yellow card) 80'	Attendance: 3,621; Referee: Jakob Kehlet

=== Semi-finals ===
23 July 2020	OB	3–1	Horsens	Nature Energy Park, Odense
18:00	M. Lund (yellow card) 8'; Fenger 21' (Skjelvik); Larsen (yellow card) 41'; Svendsen 78' (pen.); Hyllegaard 86' (M. Lund)	OB Report	Hansson (yellow card) 34'; Jacobsen (yellow card) 43'; Okosun 63' (Frantsen); Prip (yellow card) 77'	Attendance: 3,884; Referee: Mads-Kristoffer Kristoffersen

24 July 2020	Horsens	1–1 (2–4 agg.)	OB	CASA Arena Horsens, Horsens
14:00	Gemmer (yellow card) 34'; Prip (yellow card) 38'; Kiilerich 61' (Thorsen); Thorsen (yellow card) 73'	OB Report	Frøkjær-Jensen (yellow card) 12'; Skjelvik (yellow card) 44'; Kløve (yellow card) 45+4'; Hyllegaard 78' (Opondo)	Attendance: 2,171; Referee: Michael Tykgaard

=== European play-off match ===
29 July 2020	AGF	2–1	OB	Ceres Park, Aarhus
18:00

== Relegation play-offs ==
The two sides who finished 3rd in the relegation round will play a two-legged tie to determine who stays up and who is relegated to the 2020–21 Danish 1st Division.

13 July 2020	Hobro	1–2	Lyngby	DS Arena, Hobro
19:00	Louati 11'	Report	Corlu 55'; Gytkjær 87'	Referee: Morten Krogh

20 July 2020	Lyngby	2–2	Hobro	Lyngby Stadion, Lyngby
19:00	Hebo 22' (Marcussen); Corlu 68' (Warming) (red card) 90+9'; Ørnskov (yellow card) 83'; Winther (yellow card) 87'; Mikkelsen (yellow card) 90+3'; Gregor (yellow card) 90+6'	Report	Nielsen 8' (o.g.); Babayan (yellow card) 11' (yellow-red card) 90+9' (goal) 76' (Haarup); Bøge (yellow card) 57'; Sabbi (yellow card) 73'; Cappis (yellow card) 83'; Onkony (red card) 90+9'	Referee: Mads-Kristoffer Kristoffersen

Lyngby won 4–3 on aggregate. As a result Hobro was relegated, while Lyngby BK would remain in the Superliga in 2020-21.

== Season statistics ==
=== Top scorers ===
As of 29 July 2020.

Rank	Player	Club	Goals
1	(Denmark) Ronnie Schwartz	Silkeborg/Midtjylland	18
2	(Poland) Kamil Wilczek	Brøndby	17
2	(Denmark) Patrick Mortensen	AGF	17
4	(Norway) Sander Svendsen	OB	12
5	(Denmark) Mikkel Damsgaard	Nordsjælland	11
5	(Ghana) Mohammed Kudus	Nordsjælland	11
7	(Denmark) Bashkim Kadrii	OB	10
7	(Denmark) Lucas Andersen	AaB	10
7	(Netherlands) Tom van Weert	AaB	10
10	(Cyprus) Pieros Sotiriou	Copenhagen	9
10	(Denmark) Emil Riis Jakobsen	Randers	9
10	(Senegal) Dame N'Doye	Copenhagen	9

== Attendances ==
Pos	Team	Total	High	Low	Average	Change
1	Copenhagen	199,897	29,310	0	11,105	−35.7%
2	Brøndby	191,340	21,746	0	10,630	−22.6%
3	AGF	142,426	22,175	0	7,913	−8.1%
4	Midtjylland	110,184	11,422	0	6,121	−16.3%
5	OB	96,324	10,441	0	5,351	−22.7%
6	AaB	69,708	11,645	0	3,873	−31.6%
7	SønderjyskE	55,651	7,417	0	3,478	−28.6%
8	Esbjerg	51,061	5,907	0	3,191	−43.1%
9	Lyngby	53,048	8,547	0	3,120	n/a
10	Randers	48,992	9,947	0	2,882	−26.4%
11	Silkeborg	38,358	5,432	0	2,397	n/a
12	Hobro	33,736	5,428	0	1,984	−12.9%
13	Horsens	30,959	3,565	0	1,821	−50.4%
14	Nordsjælland	31,286	5,133	0	1,738	−50.4%
	League total	1,152,970	29,310	0	4,764	−27.6%

Updated to games played on 29 July 2020
Source: SuperStats.dk

Due to the COVID-19 pandemic some games were played without spectators and some games were played with a reduced amount allowed.
