= Carl Björk (footballer, born 2000) =

Swedish footballer (born 2000)

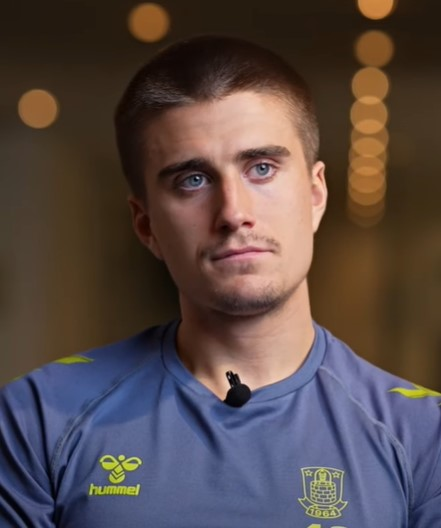
- Björk in 2022

Personal information
- Date of birth: 19 January 2000 (age 26)
- Place of birth: Umeå, Sweden
- Height: 1.88 m (6 ft 2 in)
- Position: Forward

Team information
- Current team: GIF Sundsvall
- Number: 8

Youth career
- IFK Holmsund/Sandviks IK
- Umeå IK
- IFK Umeå
- 2013–2016: Umeå FC
- 2017–2019: IFK Norrköping

Senior career*
Years	Team	Apps	(Gls)
2016	Umeå FC	1	(0)
2016–2021	IFK Norrköping	30	(7)
2017–2020	→ IF Sylvia (loan)	72	(18)
2020	→ Trelleborgs FF (loan)	12	(1)
2022–	Brøndby	14	(0)
2023–2024	→ IFK Norrköping (loan)	35	(2)
2025–2026	→ B.93 (loan)	41	(8)
2026–	GIF Sundsvall	9	(0)

International career
2017	Sweden U17	4	(1)
2017–2018	Sweden U19	4	(0)
- * Club domestic league appearances and goals as of 12 November 2026

Carl Björk (born 19 January 2000) is a Swedish professional footballer who plays as a forward for Superettan club GIF Sundsvall.

== Club career ==
=== Umeå IK ===
Björk started his career at IFK Holmsund/Sandviks IK. After spells at Umeå IK and IFK Umeå, he joined Umeå FC at the age of 13 in 2013. Björk made his debut for Umeå FC's first team in the Swedish Division 1 on 10 July 2016 in a 1–1 draw against Nyköpings BIS, where he came on the pitch in the 85th minute.

=== IFK Norrköping ===
At the age of 16, he moved from his parents' home in Umeå to Norrköping, where he joined IFK Norrköping in July 2016. He spent the 2017 to 2019 seasons on loan at IF Sylvia. Ahead of the 2019 season, Björk was promoted to IFK Norrköping's first team. Björk made his Allsvenskan debut on 14 June 2020 in a 2–1 win over Kalmar FF.

In August 2020, Björk was loaned out to Trelleborgs FF on a deal for the remainder of the 2020 season. After returning to IFK Norrköping for 2021, he established himself as a key player for the team, scoring eight goals in 27 appearances throughout the season.

=== Brøndby ===
On 30 January 2022 it was confirmed that Björk had joined Danish Superliga club Brøndby IF on a deal until June 2026. He made his competitive debut for the club on 20 February, featuring in the starting line-up of a 2–0 league victory against Nordsjælland. He strained his hamstring during the spring, sidelining him for several months.

On 18 August 2023, Björk returned to IFK Norrköping on a one-year loan deal. On 1 July 2024, the clubs agreed to extend the loan agreement, so that it would expire on 31 December 2024. He left the club at the end of 2024 when his contract expired.

On 3 February 2025, on the transfer deadline day, it was confirmed that Björk moved to Danish 1st Division club B.93 on a season-long loan deal. After the loan spell, Björk returned to Brøndby in the summer of 2025. However, on 8 July 2025, both clubs confirmed, that Björks loan spell had been extended for the upcoming season.

=== GIF Sundsvall ===
On 22 July 2026, Björk signed with Superettan club GIF Sundsvall.

== Career statistics ==
As of match played 6 October 2024

Appearances and goals by club, season and competition
Club	Season	League			National cup (Note: Includes Svenska Cupen, Danish Cup)		Europe		Other		Total	
Club	Season	Division	Apps	Goals	Apps	Goals	Apps	Goals	Apps	Goals	Apps	Goals
Umeå FC	2016	Division 1	1	0	0	0	—		—		1	0
IFK Norrköping	2016	Allsvenskan	0	0	0	0	0	0	—		0	0
IFK Norrköping	2017	Allsvenskan	0	0	0	0	0	0	—		0	0
IFK Norrköping	2018	Allsvenskan	0	0	0	0	—		—		0	0
IFK Norrköping	2019	Allsvenskan	0	0	4	3	0	0	—		4	3
IFK Norrköping	2020	Allsvenskan	4	0	3	0	—		—		7	0
IFK Norrköping	2021	Allsvenskan	26	7	1	1	—		—		27	8
IFK Norrköping	Total		30	7	8	4	0	0	—		38	11
IF Sylvia (loan)	2017	Division 2	21	7	0	0	—		—		21	7
IF Sylvia (loan)	2018	Division 2	25	8	0	0	—		—		25	8
IF Sylvia (loan)	2019	Division 1	25	3	0	0	—		—		25	3
IF Sylvia (loan)	2020	Division 1	1	0	0	0	—		—		1	0
IF Sylvia (loan)	Total		72	18	0	0	—		—		72	18
Trelleborgs FF (loan)	2020	Superettan	12	1	0	0	—		0	0	12	1
Brøndby	2021–22	Danish Superliga	11	0	0	0	0	0	—		11	0
Brøndby	2022–23	Danish Superliga	3	0	0	0	0	0	—		3	0
Brøndby	Total		14	0	0	0	0	0	—		14	0
IFK Norrköping (loan)	2023	Allsvenskan	9	1	5	3	—		—		14	4
IFK Norrköping (loan)	2024	Allsvenskan	23	1	1	0	—		—		24	1
IFK Norrköping (loan)	Total		32	2	6	3	—		—		38	5
Career total			161	28	14	7	0	0	0	0	175	35
