= Victor Lind (footballer) =

Danish footballer

Personal information
- Full name: Victor Stange Lind
- Date of birth: 12 July 2003 (age 23)
- Place of birth: Løgumkloster, Denmark
- Height: 1.76 m (5 ft 9 in)
- Position: Forward

Team information
- Current team: Hammarby IF
- Number: 9

Youth career
- –2018: SønderjyskE
- 2018–2021: Midtjylland

Senior career*
| Years | Team | Apps | (Gls) |
| 2021–2024 | Midtjylland | 26 | (4) |
| 2022 | → HamKam (loan) | 7 | (0) |
| 2023 | → Norrköping (loan) | 29 | (6) |
| 2024 | → Vejle (loan) | 12 | (0) |
| 2025–2026 | Brommapojkarna | 27 | (10) |
| 2026– | Hammarby IF | 28 | (10) |

International career^{‡}
| 2018–2019 | Denmark U16 | 9 | (4) |
| 2019–2020 | Denmark U17 | 11 | (7) |
| 2020 | Denmark U18 | 2 | (0) |
| 2021–2022 | Denmark U19 | 9 | (0) |
| 2022 | Denmark U20 | 2 | (0) |
| 2023– | Denmark U21 | 8 | (0) |
- * Club domestic league appearances and goals as of 7 November 2026 ‡ National team caps and goals as of 17:58, 31 January 2024 (UTC)

Victor Stange Lind (born 12 July 2003) is a Danish professional footballer who plays for Allsvenskan side Hammarby IF.

== Club career ==
Lind was born in Løgumkloster and was part of the SønderjyskE academy, before moving to FC Midtjylland in 2018.

He made his professional debut for Midtjylland on the 28 July 2021, coming on as a substitute during the Champions League qualifying 2–1 home win against Celtic, that saw them reach the next round. On 29 January 2023, Lind joined Swedish club IFK Norrköping on a year-long loan deal. On 31 January 2024, Lind was once again loaned out, this time to Danish Superliga side Vejle Boldklub for the rest of the season. After finishing his loan spell, Heiselberg returned to Midtjylland.

On 13 January 2025, Allsvenskan side IF Brommapojkarna confirmed that they had bought Victor Lind in Midtjylland. A year later he moved to Hammarby Fotboll for reportedly the biggest fee ever between two Swedish teams.

== Career statistics ==
As of match played 1 December 2024

Appearances and goals by club, season and competition
| Club | Season | League | | | Cup | | Continental | | Other | | Total | |
| Club | Season | Division | Apps | Goals | Apps | Goals | Apps | Goals | Apps | Goals | Apps | Goals |
|---|---|---|---|---|---|---|---|---|---|---|---|---|
| Midtjylland | 2021–22 | Danish Superliga | 20 | 3 | 5 | 0 | 5 (Note: Three appearances in UEFA Champions League, two appearances in UEFA Conference League) | 0 | — | | 30 | 3 |
| Midtjylland | 2022–23 | Danish Superliga | 3 | 0 | 0 | 0 | 1 (Note: Appearances in UEFA Champions League) | 0 | — | | 4 | 0 |
| Midtjylland | 2024–25 | Danish Superliga | 3 | 1 | 0 | 0 | 1 (Note: Appearances in UEFA Europa League) | 0 | — | | 4 | 1 |
| Midtjylland | Total | | 26 | 4 | 5 | 0 | 7 | 0 | 0 | 0 | 38 | 4 |
| HanKam (loan) | 2022 | Eliteserien | 7 | 0 | 0 | 0 | — | | — | | 7 | 0 |
| Norrköping (loan) | 2023 | Allsvenskan | 29 | 6 | 5 | 1 | — | | — | | 34 | 7 |
| Vejle (loan) | 2023–24 | Danish Superliga | 12 | 0 | — | | — | | — | | 12 | 0 |
| Career total | | | 74 | 10 | 10 | 1 | 7 | 0 | 0 | 0 | 91 | 11 |
