= Jesper Jansson =

Swedish footballer (born 1971)

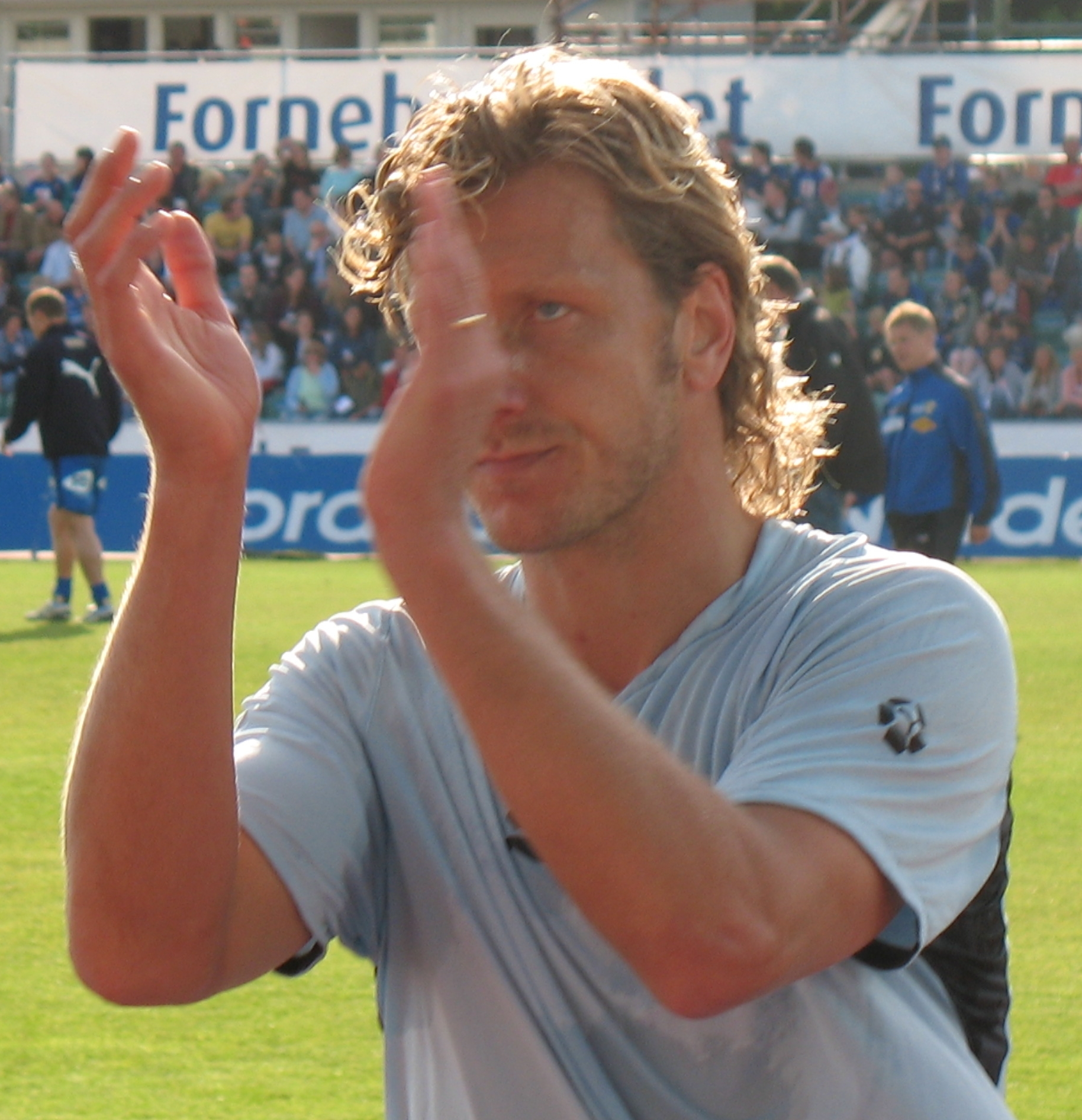
- Jansson in 2006

Personal information
- Full name: Jesper Urban Jansson
- Date of birth: 8 January 1971 (age 55)
- Place of birth: Växjö, Sweden
- Height: 1.87 m (6 ft 2 in)
- Positions: Defender; midfielder

Team information
- Current team: IFK Göteborg (head of football)

Senior career*
Years	Team	Apps	(Gls)
1988–1993	Östers IF	91	(9)
1994–1995	AIK	34	(6)
1996	Djurgårdens IF	24	(1)
1997–1999	Stabæk Fotball	51	(11)
1999–2000	Genk	21	(2)
2000–2004	Helsingborgs IF	101	(6)
2005–2006	Stabæk Fotball	39	(2)
2007	Högaborgs BK	0	(0)
Total		361	(37)

International career
1986–1987	Sweden U16	13	(2)
1988	Sweden U18	8	(1)
1991–1992	Sweden U21/O	10	(0)
1994	Sweden	1	(0)
- * Club domestic league appearances and goals

Jesper Urban Jansson (born 8 January 1971) is a Swedish former professional footballer who played as a defender or midfielder. He is the head of football of Allsvenskan club IFK Göteborg since April 2025.

As a player, he represented Östers IF, AIK, Djurgårdens IF, Stabæk, KRC Genk, Helsingborgs IF, and Högabergs BK during a club career that spanned between 1988 and 2007. He won one cap for the Sweden national team in 1994 and represented the Sweden Olympic team at the 1992 Summer Olympics.

He has worked as sporting director for Helsingborgs IF, Hammarby IF, and AC Omonia.

== Club career ==
Jansson was the captain of AIK during the season 1994-1995. His move to rival club Djurgårdens IF in 1996 was not a popular one amongst fans especially for a hooligan firm associated with AIK called Firman Boys. After leaving the club Jansson received death threats and had his door painted orange (the color of Firman Boys) with the text Judas. One of the reasons for him subsequently leaving Djurgårdens IF in 1997 for Norwegian club Stabæk Fotball was because of this intimidation. Even after moving to another country and securing a protected identity he would still go on to receive threats.

He was a part of the Helsingborgs IF team that eliminated Inter Milan to qualify for the 2000–01 UEFA Champions League.

== International career ==
Jansson was a member of the Sweden Olympic football team at the 1992 Summer Olympics in Barcelona. Jansson earned one cap for the Sweden national team, making his only appearance in 1994 in a Joe Robbie Cup match against the United States.

== Post-playing career ==
After retiring, Jansson was the general manager at Helsingborgs IF between 2008 and 2014. In 2015, he was appointed head scout at F.C. Copenhagen, but left a year later. On 28 April 2017, Jansson was appointed director of football of Hammarby IF, before stepping down in 2023.

On 14 June 2023, he was appointed sporting director of AC Omonia. He was dismissed from his role after only 7 months in charge, along with the managing staff he appointed, after accusations from the club president that Jansson was not doing his job and was treating the appointment on Cyprus as a vacation. Jansson denied wrongdoing, pointing to his years of experience and the fact that he has sold players for 50-60 million euros as evidence that he takes his jobs seriously.

== Personal life ==
Jansson is the brother of former professional footballer Ulrik Jansson and the father of the professional footballer Kevin Höög Jansson.

== Career statistics ==
Appearances and goals by national team and year
National team	Year	Apps	Goals
Sweden	1994	1	0
Total		1	0
