= Ulrik Jansson =

Swedish footballer

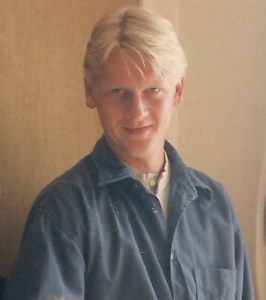
- Ulrik Jansson in 1996

Personal information
- Full name: Rolf Ulrik Jansson
- Date of birth: 2 February 1968 (age 58)
- Place of birth: Växjö, Sweden
- Height: 1.88 m (6 ft 2 in)
- Position: Midfielder

Senior career*
Years	Team	Apps	(Gls)
1984–1986	IFK Värnamo	26	(1)
1986–1994	Östers IF	151	(18)
1994–2004	Helsingborgs IF	157	(9)
2004–2005	Ängelholms FF		

International career
1985–1986	Sweden U19	9	(2)
1987–1990	Sweden U21	17	(1)
1990–1991	Sweden	6	(0)
- * Club domestic league appearances and goals

Rolf Ulrik Jansson (born 2 February 1968) is a Swedish former footballer who played as a midfielder. Jansson began his career in Östers IF. In 1994 he transferred to Helsingborgs IF where he became a Swedish champion in 1999. He was a member of Sweden's 1990 FIFA World Cup squad and won a total of six caps during his career.

== Personal life ==
Jansson is the brother of former professional footballer Jesper Jansson and the uncle of the professional footballer Kevin Höög Jansson.

== Career statistics ==
=== International ===
Appearances and goals by national team and year
National team	Year	Apps	Goals
Sweden	1990	4	0
Sweden	1991	2	0
Total		6	0
