= Andriy Sidelnikov =

Ukrainian footballer (born 1967)

Personal information
- Full name: Andriy Anatoliyovych Sidelnikov
- Date of birth: 27 September 1967 (age 59)
- Place of birth: Rovenky, Luhansk Oblast, Ukrainian SSR (present-day Ukraine)
- Height: 1.95 m (6 ft 5 in)
- Positions: Defender; midfielder

Youth career
- 1983: Kryvbas Kryvyi Rih

Senior career*
Years	Team	Apps	(Gls)
1984–1985	Dnipro Dnipropetrovsk	1	(0)
1987–1991	Dnipro Dnipropetrovsk	86	(8)
1992–1994	Wattenscheid 09	18	(0)
1995–1996	Chunnam Dragons	45	(6)
1997	CSKA Moscow	1	(0)
1998	Dnipro Dnipropetrovsk	26	(0)
1999	Kapaz Gäncä	8	(0)
1999–2000	Chornomorets-2 Odesa	3	(0)

International career
1988–1990	Soviet Union (U-21)		
1990	Soviet Union	2	(0)
Medal record
Representing the Soviet Union
UEFA European Under-21 Championship
Winner	1990 Europe
- * Club domestic league appearances and goals

Andriy Anatoliyovych Sidelnikov (Ukrainian: Андрій Анатолійович Сідельніков, Russian: Андрей Анатольевич Сидельников) (born 27 September 1967) is a Soviet and Ukrainian former professional footballer who played as a defender or midfielder.

== Club career ==
- 1984–1985 Dnipro Dnipropetrovsk
- 1986 Dynamo-D Kyiv
- 1987–1991 Dnipro Dnipropetrovsk
- 1992–1994 Wattenscheid 09
- 1995–1996 Chunnam Dragons
- 1997 CSKA Moscow
- 1998 Dnipro Dnipropetrovsk
- 1999 Kapaz Gäncä

== International career ==
Sidelnikov made his debut for Soviet Union on 23 November 1990 in a friendly against Trinidad and Tobago.

== Honours ==
- Soviet Premier League: 1988; runner-up: 1989
- Soviet Cup: 1989
- K-League third place: 1996
- UEFA European Under-21 Football Championship: 1990
- UEFA European Under-21 Championship 1990: Golden Boot
