= Miguel Sandberg =

Taiwanese Footballer (born 2002)

Personal information
- Full name: Miguel Filip Sandberg
- Date of birth: 5 August 2002 (age 24)
- Place of birth: Stockholm, Sweden
- Height: 1.80 m (5 ft 11 in)
- Positions: Midfielder; striker

Team information
- Current team: GIF Sundsvall
- Number: 7

Senior career*
Years	Team	Apps	(Gls)
2017	Segeltorps IF	5	(0)
2020–2021	FC Djursholm	6	(0)
2022–2023	Västerås SK	25	(2)
2022	→ IFK Eskilstuna (loan)	4	(1)
2023	→ Oskarshamn (loan)	5	(2)
2024	Karlbergs BK	21	(3)
2025-	GIF Sundsvall	39	(1)

International career^{‡}
2018-2019	Chinese Taipei U19	7	(2)
2023–	Chinese Taipei	7	(1)
- * Club domestic league appearances and goals as of 12 November 2026 ‡ National team caps and goals as of 25 December 2024

Miguel Filip Sandberg (Chinese: 岳明鋒 Yue Ming-feng; born 5 August 2002) is a footballer who plays as a midfielder or striker for GIF Sundsvall. Born in Sweden, he represents the Chinese Taipei national team.

== Early life ==
Sandberg started playing senior club football at the age of fourteen.

== Youth career ==
As a youth player, Sandberg joined the youth academy of Swedish side Segeltorps IF, helping the youth team win the 2016 Sweden under-14 national cup.

== Senior club career ==
In 2022, Sandberg signed for Swedish side Västerås SK, where he suffered an injury.

== International career ==
Born in Sweden to a Swedish father and Taiwanese mother, Sandberg was eligible to represent either Sweden or Chinese Taipei. He represented Chinese Taipei internationally at youth level at the 2018 AFC U-19 Championship, where he was the youngest player in the team.

Sandberg made his senior team debut for Chinese Taipei on 8 September 2023, in a friendly match against Philippines.

On 18 November 2024, he scored his first international goal in a friendly match against Singapore.

International goals
No	Date	Venue	Opponent	Score	Results	Competition
1	18 November 2024	Singapore National Stadium, Kallang Singapore	Singapore	0–2	2–3	Friendly

== Style of play ==
Sandberg operates as a midfielder or striker and is known for his speed.

== Personal life ==
Sandberg is the son of Swedish sports director Karl Sandberg. He has been nicknamed "Migge".
