= Mikkel Hyllegaard =

Danish footballer (born 1999)

Personal information
- Full name: Mikkel Hyllegaard
- Date of birth: 16 May 1999 (age 27)
- Place of birth: Odense, Denmark
- Height: 1.73 m (5 ft 8 in)
- Position: Forward

Team information
- Current team: Víkingur Gøta
- Number: 11

Youth career
- Søhus Stige
- Næsby
- Oure FA

Senior career*
Years	Team	Apps	(Gls)
2016–2019	SfB-Oure FA	?	(32)
2020–2022	OB	30	(4)
2022–2025	SønderjyskE	19	(1)
2024	→ Middelfart (loan)	2	(0)
2025	07 Vestur	21	(5)
2026–	Víkingur Gøta	11	(1)
- * Club domestic league appearances and goals as of 1 November 2026

Mikkel Hyllegaard (Danish pronunciation: [ˈhyləˌkɒˀ]; born 16 May 1999) is a Danish professional footballer who plays for Faroese club Víkingur Gøta.

== Club career ==
Born in Odense, Hyllegaard started his senior career at SfB-Oure FA in the Denmark Series, the fifth tier of the Danish football league system, where he developed into a prolific goalscorer. In the 2017–18 season, he scored 23 goals as he led the league in scoring.

On 28 December 2019, Odense Boldklub (OB) signed Hyllegaard to a three-year contract. He made his debut as a 64th-minute substitute against Brøndby IF on 16 January 2020.

On 2 June 2022 it was confirmed, that Hyllegaard had signed a deal until June 2025 with newly relegated Danish 1st Division team SønderjyskE. In December 2023, to get more minutes in the legs, Hyllegaard - together with his teammate, Mads Hansen - joined Middelfart Boldklub on loan until the end of the season.

However, on 4 February 2025, Sønderjyske confirmed that they had terminated Hyllegaard's contract. This was in the wake of Hyllegaard having trained with Faroese club HB Torshavn during January.

On 15 February 2025 it was confirmed that Hyllegaard moved to Faroese club 07 Vestur.

== Career statistics ==
As of match played 14 November 2022

Appearances and goals by club, season and competition
Club	Season	League			Cup		Continental		Other		Total	
Club	Season	Division	Apps	Goals	Apps	Goals	Apps	Goals	Apps	Goals	Apps	Goals
OB	2019–20	Superliga	8	2	0	0	—		5 (Note: Appearances in Superliga Europa League play-off)	2	13	4
OB	2020–21	Superliga	22	2	4	1	—		—		26	3
OB	2021–22	Superliga	0	0	0	0	—		—		0	0
OB	Total		30	4	4	1	—		5	2	39	7
SønderjyskE	2022–23	1st Division	13	1	4	1	—		—		17	2
Career total			43	5	8	2	—		5	2	56	9
