= Kevin Höög Jansson =

Swedish footballer

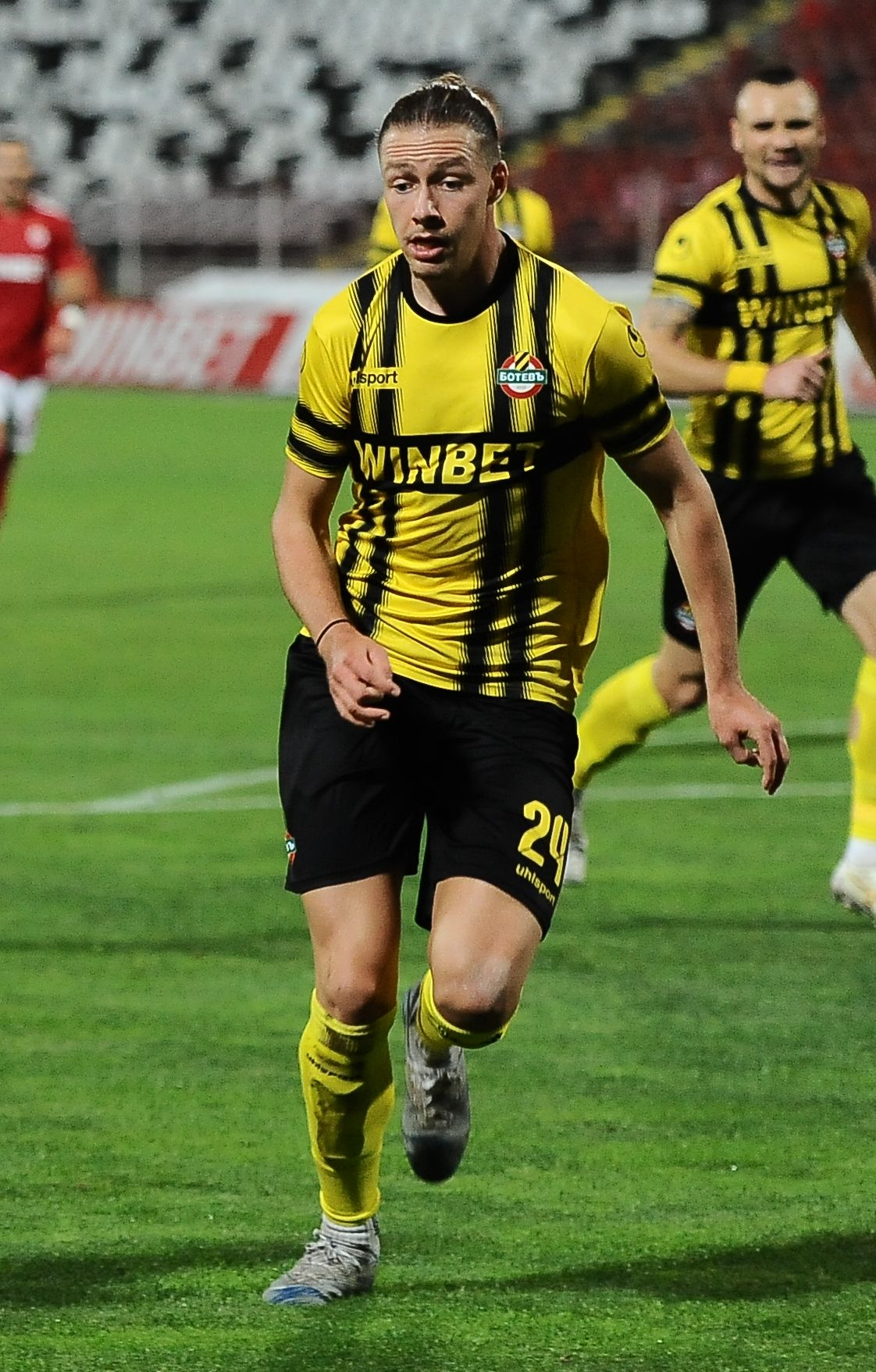
- Jansson with Botev Plovdiv in 2021

Personal information
- Full name: Kevin Nils Lennart Höög Jansson
- Date of birth: 29 September 2000 (age 26)
- Place of birth: Helsingborg, Sweden
- Height: 1.90 m (6 ft 3 in)
- Positions: Midfielder; centre-back

Team information
- Current team: Estrela da Amadora
- Number: 6

Youth career
- –2019: Helsingborgs IF

Senior career*
Years	Team	Apps	(Gls)
2019	Mjällby AIF	1	(0)
2020	Fremad Amager	21	(1)
2021–2022	Botev Plovdiv	27	(0)
2022–2023	Gangwon FC	22	(1)
2023–2025	IFK Norrköping	44	(2)
2024	→ Östers IF (loan)	10	(1)
2026–	Estrela da Amadora	13	(0)
- * Club domestic league appearances and goals as of 25 May 2026

Kevin Nils Lennart Höög Jansson (born 29 September 2000) is a Swedish professional footballer who plays as a midfielder or centre-back for Primeira Liga club Estrela da Amadora.

== Career ==
In 2019, Höög Jansson signed for Mjällby in the Swedish Superettan from the youth academy of Swedish top flight side Helsingborg.

Before the second half of the 2019–20 season, he signed for Fremad Amager of the Danish 1st Division.

Before the second half of the 2020–21 season, he signed for Bulgarian top flight club Botev Plovdiv.

On 5 March 2022, he joined Gangwon FC of K League 1.

After a three-year spell back in his homecountry with IFK Norrköping (which included a three-month loan to Östers IF), on 1 January 2026, Höög Jansson moved to Portugal, joining Primeira Liga club Estrela da Amadora, where he signed a contract until June 2028.

== Personal life ==
Höög Jansson is the son of the former professional footballer Jesper Jansson and the nephew of the former professional footballer Ulrik Jansson.

== Career statistics ==
As of match played 29 October 2023

Appearances and goals by club, season and competition
Club	Season	League			National cup		Continental		Other		Total	
Club	Season	Division	Apps	Goals	Apps	Goals	Apps	Goals	Apps	Goals	Apps	Goals
Mjällby AIF	2019	Superettan	1	0	—		—		—		1	0
Fremad Amager	2019–20	1. Division	8	0	—		—		—		8	0
Fremad Amager	2020–21	1. Division	13	1	4	0	—		—		17	1
Fremad Amager	Total		21	1	4	0	0	0	0	0	25	1
Botev Plovdiv	2020–21	First League	9	0	0	0	—		—		9	0
Botev Plovdiv	2021–22	First League	18	0	1	0	—		—		19	0
Botev Plovdiv	Total		27	0	1	0	0	0	0	0	28	0
Gangwon FC	2022	K League 1	21	1	0	0	—		—		21	1
Gangwon FC	2023	K League 1	1	0	0	0	—		—		1	0
Gangwon FC	Total		22	1	0	0	0	0	0	0	22	1
IFK Norrköping	2023	Allsvenskan	9	0	1	1	—		—		10	1
Career total			80	2	6	1	0	0	0	0	86	3
