= Kristoffer Khazeni =

Swedish footballer (born 1995)

Personal information
- Full name: Kristoffer Mohsen Khazeni
- Date of birth: June 25, 1995 (age 31)
- Place of birth: Stockholm, Sweden
- Height: 1.85 m (6 ft 1 in)
- Position: Midfielder

Youth career
- Kärrdals IF
- FC Djursholm

Senior career*
Years	Team	Apps	(Gls)
2013–2014	Danderyds SK	13	(4)
2015–2016	Enebybergs IF	41	(26)
2017–2018	IFK Stocksund	42	(33)
2019	IF Sylvia	19	(6)
2020–2024	IFK Norrköping	53	(2)
- * Club domestic league appearances and goals as of 13 November 2024

Kristoffer Mohsen Khazeni (Persian: کریستوفر محسن خازنی; born 25 June 1995) is a Swedish footballer who played as a midfielder. He spent five seasons with IFK Norrköping in Allsvenskan.

== Club career ==
A prolific goalscorer from the Swedish lower leagues, Khazeni made his Allsvenskan debut for IFK Norrköping on 17 May 2021 against Varbergs BoIS during the 2021 season. He scored his first Allsvenskan goal on 22 September 2021 against IK Sirius.
