= Hobro Stadium =

Football stadium in Hobro, Denmark

DS Arena
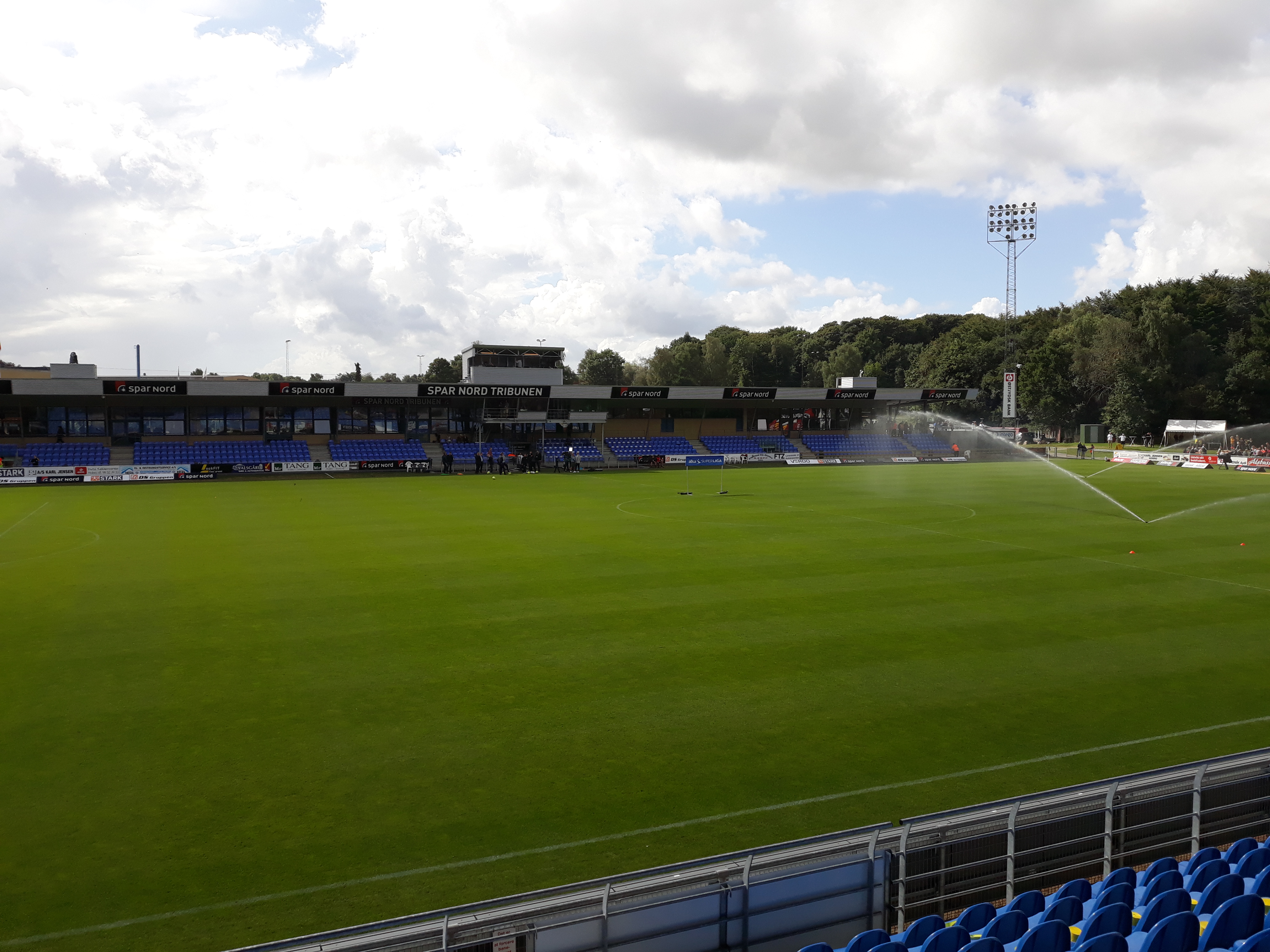
- View of the stadium from the east
- Interactive map of DS Arena
- Location: Amerikavej 9A, DK-9500 Hobro, Mariagerfjord, Denmark
- Coordinates: 56°38′06″N 9°49′11.70″E
- Owner: Hobro IK
- Operator: Hobro IK
- Capacity: 7,500
- Surface: Grass
- Record attendance: 6,596 (vs. AaB, 16 March 2015)
- Field size: 105 by 68 metres (114.8 yd × 74.4 yd)

Construction
- Opened: 1958
- Renovated: 2011, 2015

Hobro Stadium is a 7,500 capacity football stadium in Hobro, Denmark, which is the home ground of Hobro IK. The stadium is part of Hobro Idrætscenter, a sports centre that also includes two indoor halls, a swimming pool, and a gymnasium.

== Capacity ==
- Jutland Bank Tribune : 2,250 seats + 1,400 standing rooms
- Pajo Bolte Tribunen : 1,400 standing rooms
- SparNord Tribunen : 750 seats + 100 standing rooms
- standing rooms outside of tribune : 3,325 (Nord-West) + 800 (South-East)
