= Ísak Andri Sigurgeirsson =

Icelandic footballer

Personal information
- Full name: Ísak Andri Sigurgeirsson
- Date of birth: 11 September 2003 (age 23)
- Place of birth: Iceland
- Height: 1.75 m (5 ft 9 in)
- Position: Midfielder

Team information
- Current team: IFK Norrköping

Youth career
- –2021: Stjarnan

Senior career*
| Years | Team | Apps | (Gls) |
| 2020–2023 | Stjarnan | 49 | (12) |
| 2021 | → ÍBV (loan) | 10 | (3) |
| 2023– | IFK Norrköping | 68 | (10) |
| 2026 | → Viborg (loan) | 5 | (0) |

International career^{‡}
| 2019 | Iceland U16 | 2 | (1) |
| 2021–2022 | Iceland U19 | 4 | (1) |
| 2022– | Iceland U21 | 9 | (0) |
- * Club domestic league appearances and goals as of 13:18, 13 October 2026 (UTC) ‡ National team caps and goals as of 6 September 2024

Ísak Andri Sigurgeirsson (born 11 September 2003) is an Icelandic footballer who plays as a midfielder for Swedish club Norrköping.

== Club career ==
Ísak Andri made his debut for Stjarnan as a substitute against Fylkir in the 2020 season, aged 16. For the latter half of the 2021 season, Ísak was loaned to ÍBV in the second tier. After establishing himself with Stjarnan he was sold to Norrköping on 18 July 2023, signing a 3-year contract.

Ísak Andri made his Allsvenskan debut as a substitute against IFK Göteborg on 7 August 2023.

On 2 February 2026, Ísak Andri was loaned to Danish Superliga side Viborg FF from IFK Norrköping for the remainder of the season, with an option to make the transfer permanent. He debuted the following weekend in a 1–0 win over Silkeborg, coming into the game as a substitute. After spending part of his loan spell injured, Viborg FF announced on 22 May that he would return to Norrköping at the end of his loan.

== International career ==
He has featured for the Icelandic U16, U19 and U21 youth sides.
