= Anton Eriksson =

Swedish footballer

Personal information
- Full name: Anton Mikael Eriksson
- Date of birth: 5 March 2000 (age 26)
- Place of birth: Umeå, Sweden
- Height: 1.82 m (6 ft 0 in)
- Position: Defender

Team information
- Current team: IFK Norrköping
- Number: 24

Youth career
- Ersmarks IK
- –2015: IFK Umeå
- 2016: Umeå FC

Senior career*
Years	Team	Apps	(Gls)
2015	IFK Umeå 2	1	(0)
2016–2017	Umeå FC Akademi	31	(6)
2016–2019	Umeå FC	57	(7)
2020–2022	GIF Sundsvall	52	(0)
2022–	IFK Norrköping	103	(0)

International career^{‡}
2017–2018	Sweden U19	10	(1)
2021	Sweden U21	1	(0)
2024	Sweden	1	(0)
- * Club domestic league appearances and goals as of 11 November 2026 ‡ National team caps and goals as of 23:20, 12 January 2024 (UTC)

Anton Mikael Eriksson (born 5 March 2000) is a Swedish professional footballer who plays for IFK Norrköping as a defender.

He was bought from GIF Sundsvall in the summer of 2022.

== International career ==
Eriksson made his full international debut for the Sweden national team on 12 January 2024 in a friendly game against Estonia which Sweden won 2–1.

== Career statistics ==
=== International ===
Appearances and goals by national team and year
National team	Year	Apps	Goals
Sweden	2024	1	0
Total		1	0
