= Moses Opondo =

Ugandan footballer (born 1997)

Personal information
- Date of birth: 28 October 1997 (age 29)
- Place of birth: Lugazi, Uganda
- Height: 1.73 m (5 ft 8 in)
- Position: Midfielder

Team information
- Current team: Fredericia
- Number: 11

Youth career
- Bangsbo Freja
- AaB

Senior career*
Years	Team	Apps	(Gls)
2016–2019	Vendsyssel	68	(5)
2019–2022	OB	64	(3)
2022	→ Horsens (loan)	10	(1)
2022–2024	Horsens	59	(3)
2024–	Fredericia	38	(3)

International career^{‡}
2018–	Uganda	3	(0)
- * Club domestic league appearances and goals as of 19 May 2026 ‡ National team caps and goals as of 29 March 2024

Moses Opondo (born 28 October 1997) is a Ugandan professional footballer who plays for FC Fredericia and the Uganda national team.

Born in Uganda, Opondo moved to Denmark with his mother when he was four years old.

== Club career ==
=== Vendsyssel ===
In July 2016, Opondo was loaned out from the youth system at AaB to Vendsyssel FF. He made his Danish 1st Division debut on 24 July 2016, coming on as a 61st minute substitute for Washington Brandão in a 1-0 home defeat to HB Køge. In January 2017, Opondo's loan was turned into a permanent deal. He scored his first competitive goal for the club on 14 May 2017 in a 1–0 away defeat in the league to FC Helsingør. His goal, scored in the 64th minute, was the only goal of the game. In July 2017, Opondo's contract was extended until the summer of 2019. Vendsyssel suffered relegation from the Danish Superliga after the 2019–20 season.

=== OB ===
In June 2019, it was announced that Opondo had signed a four-year contract with Odense Boldklub (OB). According to Tipsbladet, OB had triggered his buy-out clause of DKK 1 million.

He had the opportunity to make his debut for OB in the Superliga on 14 July 2019, but it was only in the fourth matchday that he came on the pitch as a substitute after 71 minutes for Jens Thomasen in a 0–1 victory over Esbjerg fB.

=== AC Horsens ===
On 24 January 2022, Opondo was loaned out to Danish 1st Division club AC Horsens for the rest of the season. Ending the season with one goal in 10 games, it was confirmed on 29 May 2022, that Opondo had signed permanently for AC Horsens, penning a deal until June 2026.

On 2 September 2024 Opondo had his contract in Horsens terminated.

=== FC Fredericia ===
On the same day that his contract in Horsens was terminated, it was confirmed that he moved to FC Fredericia on a deal until June 2026. In his first season he helped the club getting promoted to the Danish Superliga for the first time in club history existence.

== International career ==
In May 2018, Opondo was called up to the Ugandan national team for friendlies against Niger and the Central African Republic. He made his senior international debut on 2 June 2018 in a 2-1 defeat to Niger.
