= Marco Lund =

Danish footballer (born 1996)

Personal information
- Full name: Marco Lund Nielsen
- Date of birth: 30 June 1996 (age 30)
- Place of birth: Ansager, Denmark
- Height: 1.83 m (6 ft 0 in)
- Position: Defender

Team information
- Current team: Diósgyőr
- Number: 4

Youth career
- Ansager IF
- Grindsted GIF
- FC Midtjylland
- Esbjerg fB

Senior career*
Years	Team	Apps	(Gls)
2016–2018	Esbjerg fB	39	(1)
2018–2021	OB	59	(2)
2021–2024	IFK Norrköping	68	(2)
2024–	Diósgyőr	41	(0)

International career^{‡}
2014–2015	Denmark U19	5	(0)
2016	Denmark U20	1	(0)
2019	Denmark U21	2	(0)
- * Club domestic league appearances and goals as of 19 January 2026 ‡ National team caps and goals as of 15 February 2022

Marco Lund Nielsen (born 30 June 1996) is a Danish footballer who plays for Hungarian club Diósgyőr.

== Career ==
Marco Lund began his senior career in Danish Esbjerg before moving to Odense in 2018. On 21 January 2021, it was announced that Lund had signed a contract with IFK Norrköping valid from 1 July 2021. On 8 February, it was announced that Lund would join IFK Norrköping directly. On 12 January 2024, Lund was signed by Hungarian Diósgyőri VTK.
