= 2022 Djurgårdens IF season =

Djurgården 2022 season

Djurgårdens IF Fotboll
2022 season
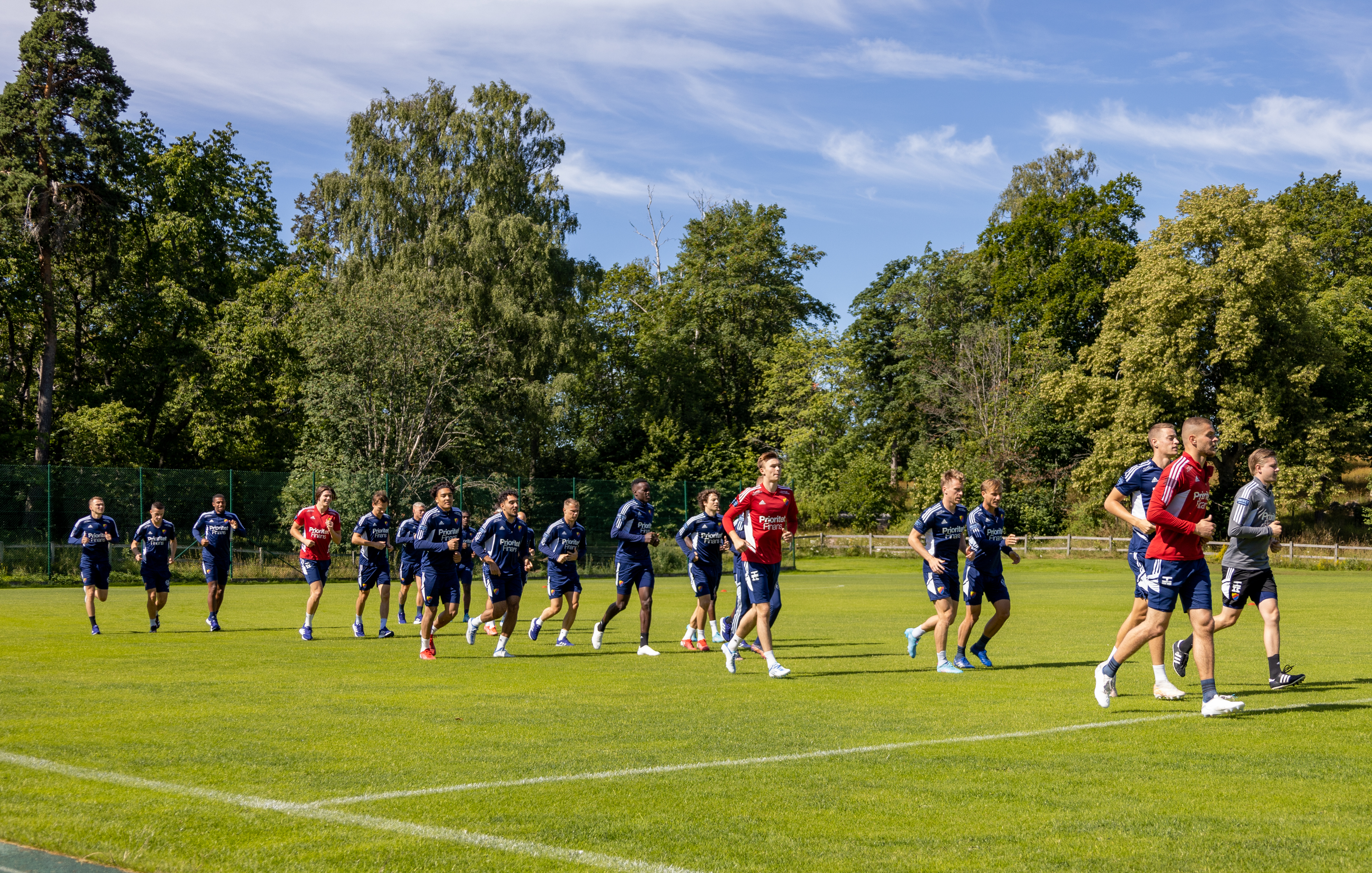
- Chairman: (Sweden) Lars-Erik Sjöberg
- Manager: (Sweden) Kim Bergstrand (Sweden) Thomas Lagerlöf
- Stadium: Tele2 Arena
- Allsvenskan: 2nd
- 2021–22 Svenska Cupen: Semi Final
- 2022–23 Svenska Cupen: Semi Final
- 2022–23 UEFA Europa Conference League: Round of 16
- Top goalscorer: League: Victor Edvardsen (9); All: Victor Edvardsen (15)
- Highest home attendance: 27,203 v Hammarby; 3 July 2022
- Lowest home attendance: 14,500 v Helsingborg; 5 May 2022
- Average home league attendance: 19,587
- Biggest win: 5-0 v Värnamo; 16 July 2022
- Biggest defeat: 0-3 v Degerfors; 1 October 2022
Home colours	Away colours	Third colours
- All statistics correct as of 6 November 2022.

The 2022 season was Djurgårdens IF's 122nd in existence, their 67th season in Allsvenskan and their 22nd consecutive season in the league. In addition to the Allsvenskan, they competed in the 2021-22 and 2022–23 editions of the Svenska Cupen, and entered the 2022–23 UEFA Europa Conference League at the 2nd Qualifying Round.

== Squad ==
=== Season squad ===
Squad No.	Name	Nationality	Position	Date of birth (age)	Previous club	Apps	Goals
Goalkeepers
15	Aleksandr Vasyutin (On loan from Zenit)	(Russia)	GK	4 March 1995 (age 31)	(Russia) Zenit Saint Petersburg	21	0
35	Jacob Widell Zetterström	(Sweden)	GK	11 July 1998 (age 28)	(Sweden) IFK Lidingö	60	0
40	André Picornell	(Sweden)	GK	3 April 2004 (age 22)	(Sweden) IF Brommapojkarna	0	0
Defenders
2	Piotr Johansson	(Sweden)	DF	28 February 1995 (age 31)	(Sweden) Kalmar FF	46	2
3	Hjalmar Ekdal	(Sweden)	DF	21 October 1998 (age 28)	(Sweden) Hammarby	73	10
4	Jesper Löfgren	(Sweden)	DF	3 May 1997 (age 29)	(Norway) SK Brann	57	1
5	Elliot Käck	(Sweden)	DF	18 September 1989 (age 37)	(Norway) IK Start	187	2
19	Pierre Bengtsson	(Sweden)	DF	12 April 1988 (age 38)	(Denmark) F.C. Copenhagen	31	0
33	Marcus Danielson	(Sweden)	DF	8 April 1989 (age 37)	(China) Dalian Professional	88	11
Midfielders
6	Rasmus Schüller	(Finland)	MF	18 June 1991 (age 35)	(Finland) HJK Helsinki	67	2
7	Magnus Eriksson (C)	(Sweden)	MF	8 April 1990 (age 36)	(United States) San Jose Earthquakes	146	29
8	Elias Andersson	(Sweden)	MF	31 January 1996 (age 30)	(Sweden) IK Sirius	42	4
9	Haris Radetinac	(Bosnia and Herzegovina)	MF	28 October 1985 (age 41)	(Sweden) Mjällby AIF	246	28
11	Albion Ademi	(Albania)	MF	19 February 1999 (age 27)	(Finland) IFK Mariehamn	22	2
12	Emmanuel Banda	(Zambia)	MF	29 September 1997 (age 29)	(Belgium) Oostende	77	12
13	Hampus Finndell	(Sweden)	MF	6 June 2000 (age 26)	(Netherlands) FC Groningen	81	10
14	Besard Šabović	(Sweden)	MF	5 January 1998 (age 28)	(Russia) FC Khimki	31	4
23	Gustav Wikheim	(Norway)	MF	18 March 1993 (age 33)	(Saudi Arabia) Al Fateh	40	9
25	Amadou Doumbouya	(Guinea)	MF	12 October 2002 (age 24)	Diamonds of Guinea Academy	13	1
32	Isak Alemayehu Mulugeta	(Sweden)	MF	11 October 2006 (age 20)	(Sweden) Djurgården Youth	1	0
Forwards
10	Joel Asoro	(Sweden)	FW	27 April 1999 (age 27)	(England) Swansea City	75	16
16	Victor Edvardsen	(Sweden)	FW	14 January 1996 (age 30)	(Sweden) Degerfors IF	46	15
17	Kalle Holmberg	(Sweden)	FW	3 March 1993 (age 33)	(Sweden) IFK Norrköping	88	18
31	Alexandros Garcia Tsotidis	(Sweden)	FW	19 July 2004 (age 22)	(Sweden) Djurgården Youth	2	1
Away on loan
21	Axel Wallenborg	(Sweden)	DF	17 December 2001 (age 24)	(Sweden) IF Brommapojkarna	0	0
24	Frank Odhiambo	(Kenya)	DF	29 October 2002 (age 24)	(Kenya) Gor Mahia	0	0
26	Linus Tagesson	(Sweden)	DF	11 February 2002 (age 24)	(Sweden) IFK Österåker	2	0
30	Tommi Vaiho	(Sweden)	GK	13 September 1988 (age 38)	(Sweden) GAIS	79	0
	Jacob Une Larsson	(Sweden)	DF	8 April 1994 (age 32)	(Sweden) IF Brommapojkarna	176	13

Last updated: 6 November 2022.
Source: []

== Transfers ==
=== Loans in ===
Date from	Position	Nationality	Name	From	Date until	Ref.
10 January 2022	GK	(Russia)	Aleksandr Vasyutin	(Russia) Zenit Saint Petersburg	28 November 2022	
21 January 2022	MF	(Cameroon)	Arnold Eba	(Cameroon) AS King Football Academy	30 November 2022	
15 March 2022	MF	(Montenegro)	Sead Hakšabanović	(Russia) Rubin Kazan	30 June 2022	

=== Loans out ===
Date from	Position	Nationality	Name	To	Date until	Ref.
1 July 2021	GK	(Norway)	Per Kristian Bråtveit	(France) Nîmes	1 July 2022	
25 January 2022	DF	(Sweden)	Jacob Une Larsson	(Greece) Panetolikos	1 July 2023	
10 February 2022	GK	(Sweden)	Tommi Vaiho	(Sweden) Sirius	31 December 2022	
2 March 2022	MF	(Sweden)	Mattias Mitku	(Sweden) Karlstad	22 September 2022	
25 March 2022	MF	(Albania)	Albion Ademi	(Finland) Lahti	17 July 2022	
31 March 2022	FW	(Sweden)	Adam Bergmark Wiberg	(Sweden) Öster	22 June 2022	
1 April 2022	DF	(Sweden)	Linus Tagesson	(Sweden) Täby	5 December 2022	
1 April 2022	DF	(Sweden)	Axel Wallenborg	(Sweden) Haninge	8 July 2022	
16 June 2022	DF	(Sweden)	Melker Jonsson	(Sweden) Landskrona	26 July 2022	
8 July 2022	DF	(Sweden)	Axel Wallenborg	(Sweden) Brommapojkarna	31 December 2022	
11 August 2022	DF	(Kenya)	Frank Odhiambo	(Sweden) Haninge	31 December 2022	

=== Transfers in ===
Date from	Position	Nationality	Name	From	Fee	Ref.
1 January 2022	DF	(Sweden)	Piotr Johansson	(Sweden) Kalmar FF	Free	
7 January 2022	FW	(Sweden)	Victor Edvardsen	(Sweden) Degerfors IF	£630,000	
19 January 2022	DF	(Kenya)	Frank Odhiambo	(Kenya) Gor Mahia	Undisclosed	
23 January 2022	DF	(Sweden)	Pierre Bengtsson	(Denmark) F.C. Copenhagen	Undisclosed	
26 January 2022	MF	(Norway)	Gustav Wikheim	(Saudi Arabia) Al Fateh	Free	
31 March 2022	MF	(Guinea)	Amadou Doumbouya	Diamonds of Guinea Academy	Free	
18 July 2022	DF	(Sweden)	Marcus Danielson	(China) Dalian Professional	Undisclosed	
10 August 2022	MF	(Sweden)	Besard Šabović	Free agent	Free	
18 November 2022	DF	(Spain)	Carlos Moros Gracia	(Sweden) Mjällby	Undisclosed	
24 November 2022	FW	(Norway)	Oliver Berg	(Sweden) Kalmar	Undisclosed	
7 December 2022	FW	(Sweden)	Jacob Bergström	(Sweden) Mjällby	Undisclosed	
8 December 2022	MF	(Sweden)	Wilmer Odefalk	(Sweden) Brommapojkarna	Undisclosed	
9 December 2022	DF	(Sweden)	Theo Bergvall	(Sweden) Brommapojkarna	Undisclosed	
9 December 2022	MF	(Sweden)	Lucas Bergvall	(Sweden) Brommapojkarna	Undisclosed	

=== Transfers out ===
Date from	Position	Nationality	Name	To	Fee	Ref.
1 January 2022	DF	(Philippines)	Jesper Nyholm	(Philippines) Muangthong United	Free	
1 January 2022	DF	(Sweden)	Victor Säfsten	(Sweden) Sylvia	Undisclosed	
30 January 2022	MF	(Zambia)	Edward Chilufya	(Denmark) FC Midtjylland	£2,160,000	
10 February 2022	MF	(Sweden)	Kofi Asare	(Sweden) Sandviken	Undisclosed	
13 February 2022	MF	(England)	Curtis Edwards	(Norway) Stabæk	Undisclosed	
22 June 2022	FW	(Sweden)	Adam Bergmark Wiberg	(Sweden) Öster	Undisclosed	
4 July 2022	GK	(Norway)	Per Kristian Bråtveit	(Norway) Vålerenga	Undisclosed	
26 July 2022	DF	(Sweden)	Melker Jonsson	(Sweden) Landskrona	Undisclosed	
15 August 2022	DF	(Norway)	Leo Cornic	(Norway) Rosenborg	Undisclosed	
27 August 2022	DF	(Sweden)	Isak Hien	(Italy) Hellas Verona	Undisclosed	
22 September 2022	MF	(Sweden)	Mattias Mitku	(Sweden) Eskilstuna	Undisclosed	
5 December 2022	DF	(Sweden)	Linus Tagesson	(Sweden) Örgryte	Undisclosed	

=== Released ===
Date from	Position	Nationality	Name	To	Notes	Ref.
1 January 2021	FW	(Sweden)	Emir Kujović		Mutual Consent	
1 January 2021	MF	(Sweden)	Nicklas Bärkroth	(Sweden) Örgryte	Mutual Consent	(Note: After Bärkroth was released, he signed for Örgryte.)
25 November 2022	FW	(Sweden)	Kalle Holmberg		Mutual Consent	

- Note: Players will join other clubs after being released or terminated from their contract. Only the following clubs are mentioned when that club signed the player in the same transfer window.

== Competitions ==
=== Overview ===
Competition	First match	Last match	Starting round	Final position	Record							
Competition	First match	Last match	Starting round	Final position	Pld	W	D	L	GF	GA	GD	Win %
Allsvenskan	4 April 2022	6 November 2022	Matchday 1	2nd	30	17	6	7	55	25	+30	56.67
Svenska Cupen 2021/22	18 August 2021	20 March 2022	Round 2	Semi-Final	5	3	1	1	7	2	+5	60.00
Svenska Cupen 2022/23	1 September 2022	19 March 2023	Round 2	Semi-Final	1	1	0	0	3	0	+3	100.00
Europa Conference League 2022/23	21 July 2022	16 March 2023	2nd Qualifying Round	Round of 16	12	10	1	1	27	12	+15	83.33
Total					48	31	8	9	92	39	+53	64.58

Last updated: 6 November 2022
Source: Soccerway

=== Club Friendlies ===
22 January 2022 Friendly	Djurgården (Sweden)	3 - 0	(Sweden) Västerås SK	Stockholm
13:00 CET	Ademi 35'; Banda 77'; Holmberg 82'	Report		Stadium: Tele2 Arena

29 January 2022 Friendly	Djurgården (Sweden)	3 - 1	(Latvia) FK Metta	Stockholm
13:00 CET	Radetinac 33'; Ademi 59'; Banda 90'	Report	Puzirevskis 66'; Vapne (red card) 90+4'	Stadium: Tele2 Arena

4 February 2022 Friendly	Djurgården (Sweden)	2 - 1	(Norway) Rosenborg BK	Las Palmas
16:00 CET	Edvardsen 30'; Ekdal 34'	Report	Holse 61'	Stadium: Ciudad deportiva de Barranco Seco

12 February 2022 Friendly	Djurgården (Sweden)	1 - 0	(Norway) Lillestrøm SK	Stockholm
15:00 CET	Radetinac 45+2'	Report		Stadium: Tele2 Arena; Attendance: 3,307; Referee: Glenn Nyberg

27 March 2022 Friendly	Djurgården (Sweden)	0 - 2	(Finland) FC Honka	Stockholm
14:00 CEST		Report	Kaufmann 13'; Modesto 17'	Stadium: Tele2 Arena; Referee: Glenn Nyberg

17 June 2022 Friendly	IK Sirius (Sweden)	3 - 3	(Sweden) Djurgården	Norrtälje
17:00 CEST	Sylisufaj 1'; Shabani 33'; Lagemyr 68'	Report	Andersson 14'; Finndell 26'; Asoro 40'	Stadium: Norrtälje Sportcentrum

=== Allsvenskan ===
==== League table ====
Pos	Team	Pld	W	D	L	GF	GA	GD	Pts	Qualification or relegation
1	BK Häcken (C)	30	18	10	2	69	37	+32	64	Qualification for the Champions League first qualifying round
2	Djurgårdens IF	30	17	6	7	55	25	+30	57	Qualification for the Europa Conference League second qualifying round (Note: The 2022–23 Svenska Cupen winners qualified for the Europa Conference League second qualifying round. Since the cup winners (BK Häcken) qualified based on league position, the cup winner spot was passed to the second-placed team, and the last Conference League second qualifying round spot was passed to the fourth-placed team.)
3	Hammarby IF	30	16	8	6	60	27	+33	56	Qualification for the Europa Conference League second qualifying round
4	Kalmar FF	30	15	6	9	41	27	+14	51	Qualification for the Europa Conference League second qualifying round
5	AIK	30	14	8	8	45	36	+9	50	

Source: svenskfotboll.se (in Swedish)
Rules for classification: 1) Points; 2) Goal difference; 3) Goals scored; 4) Head-to-head points; 5) Head-to-head goal difference; 6) Head-to-head away goals scored; 7) Play-off
(Note: Play-off is only played if need to decide champion, teams for relegation or UEFA competition and will be played on a neutral ground).
(C) Champions

==== Results summary ====
Overall								Home						Away					
Pld	W	D	L	GF	GA	GD	Pts	W	D	L	GF	GA	GD	W	D	L	GF	GA	GD
30	17	6	7	55	25	+30	57	11	1	3	38	11	+27	6	5	4	17	14	+3

Last updated: 6 November 2022.
Source: soccerway

==== Results by round ====
Round	1	2	3	4	5	6	7	8	9	10	11	12	13	14	15	16	17	18	19	20	21	22	23	24	25	26	27	28	29	30
Ground	H	A	H	A	A	H	H	A	H	A	H	A	H	A	H	A	A	H	A	H	A	A	H	A	H	H	A	H	A	H
Result	W	L	W	D	L	W	D	D	W	L	W	W	W	W	W	W	D	W	D	W	W	D	W	L	L	L	W	W	W	L
Position	2	8	6	5	8	7	6	4	4	4	3	2	2	2	1	1	2	2	3	2	2	2	1	1	2	3	2	2	2	2
Points	3	3	6	7	7	10	11	12	15	15	18	21	24	27	30	33	34	37	38	41	44	45	48	48	48	48	51	54	57	57

Updated to match(es) played on 6 November 2022. Source:
A = Away; H = Home; W = Win; D = Draw; L = Loss

==== Matches ====
===== April =====
4 April 2022 Match 1	Djurgården	3 - 1	Degerfors	Stockholm
19:10 CEST	Hakšabanović 11'; Johansson (yellow card) 31'; Edvardsen 53' 88'; Schüller (yellow card) 86'	Report	Gyau (yellow card) 14'; Örqvist (yellow card) 45+4'; Saidi 66'; Đurđić (yellow card) 77'	Stadium: Tele2 Arena; Attendance: 20,074; Referee: (Sweden) Bojan Pandžić

10 April 2022 Match 2	Mjällby	1 - 0	Djurgården	Hällevik
17:30 CEST	Rosengren (yellow card) 32'; Moro 67'	Report	Radetinac (yellow card) 58'	Stadium: Strandvallen; Attendance: 3,504; Referee: (Sweden) Andreas Ekberg

16 April 2022 Match 3	Djurgården	2 - 1	Norrköping	Stockholm
15:00 CEST	Johansson (yellow card) 16'; Eriksson (yellow card) 40'; Edvardsen (yellow card) 63'; Banda 68'; Asoro 85' (yellow card) 87'	Report	Levi 29'; Nyman (penalty missed) 62; Jean (yellow card) 64'; Abdulrazak (yellow card) 65'	Stadium: Tele2 Arena; Attendance: 15,263; Referee: (Sweden) Kaspar Sjöberg

20 April 2022 Match 4	Göteborg	1 - 1	Djurgården	Gothenburg
19:00 CEST	Jallow (yellow card) 19'; Norlin (yellow card) 22' (goal) 24'; Wendt (yellow card) 52'; Johansson (yellow card) 71'; Al-Ammari (yellow card) 90+5'	Report	Asoro 57'; Ekdal (yellow card) 64'; Finndell (yellow card) 83'; Wikheim (yellow card) 85'	Stadium: Gamla Ullevi; Attendance: 16,170; Referee: (Sweden) Fredrik Klitte

24 April 2022 Match 5	AIK	1 - 0	Djurgården	Stockholm
15:00 CEST	Hussein (yellow card) 35'; Stefanelli 45'; Milošević (yellow card) 90+2'; Nordfeldt (yellow card) 90+3'	Report	Johansson (yellow card) 37'; Hien (yellow card) 78'	Stadium: Friends Arena; Attendance: 41,407; Referee: (Sweden) Glenn Nyberg

30 April 2022 Match 6	Djurgården	4 - 0	Sirius	Stockholm
15:00 CEST	Finndell 26'; Hakšabanović 39'; Radetinac 49'; Edvardsen 57'	Report	Bjarnason (yellow card) 86'	Stadium: Tele2 Arena; Attendance: 15,779; Referee: (Sweden) Victor Wolf

===== May =====
5 May 2022 Match 7	Djurgården	2 - 2	Helsingborg	Stockholm
19:00 CEST	Davidsen 32' (o.g.); Hien 90+2'	Report	Ali 4' 21'; van den Hurk (yellow card) 71'	Stadium: Tele2 Arena; Attendance: 14,500; Referee: (Sweden) Adam Ladebäck

9 May 2022 Match 8	Elfsborg	0 - 0	Djurgården	Borås
19:00 CEST	Väisänen (yellow card) 30'; Boateng (yellow card) 32'; Frick (yellow card) 79'	Report	Bengtsson (yellow card) 6'; Hien (yellow card) 45'; Schüller (yellow card) 75'; Johansson (yellow card) 90+4'	Stadium: Borås Arena; Attendance: 7,862; Referee: (Sweden) Andreas Ekberg

16 May 2022 Match 9	Djurgården	4 - 0	Malmö	Stockholm
19:10 CEST	Chaluš 15' (o.g.); Ekdal (yellow card) 19' (goal) 33'; Hien 65'; Asoro 73'	Report	Beijmo (yellow card) 40'	Stadium: Tele2 Arena; Attendance: 20,550; Referee: (Sweden) Mohammed Al-Hakim

22 May 2022 Match 10	Kalmar	1 - 0	Djurgården	Kalmar
17:30 CEST	Skrabb (yellow card) 88'; Sætra 90+3'; Friedrich (yellow card) 90+4'; Backman (yellow card) 90+7'	Report	Finndell (yellow card) 90+4'	Stadium: Guldfågeln Arena; Attendance: 7,518; Referee: (Sweden) Adam Ladebäck

29 May 2022 Match 11	Djurgården	4 - 0	Varberg	Stockholm
15:00 CEST	Finndell 10' 35'; Edvardsen (penalty missed) 31; Schüller (yellow card) 56' (goal) 67'; Asoro 78'	Report	Mensah (yellow card) 59'; Burke (yellow card) 82'; Birkfeldt (yellow card) 83'; Tranberg (yellow card) 84'	Stadium: Tele2 Arena; Attendance: 15,648; Referee: (Sweden) Glenn Nyberg

===== June =====
26 June 2022 Match 12	Sundsvall	2 - 5	Djurgården	Sundsvall
17:30 CEST	Damus 5'; Corona (yellow card) 65'; Lasso (yellow card) 69'; Nåvik (yellow card) 80'; Engblom 87'	Report	Ekdal 14'; Asoro 19' (yellow card) 19'; Radetinac 21'; Edvardsen 38' (yellow card) 38'; Andersson (yellow card) 47'; Banda 73'	Stadium: NP3 Arena; Attendance: 5,352; Referee: (Sweden) Bojan Pandžić

===== July =====
3 July 2022 Match 13	Djurgården	1 - 0	Hammarby	Stockholm
15:00 CEST	Wikheim 68'	Report	Kurtulus (yellow card) 36'; Sandberg (yellow card) 43'; Sadiku (yellow card) 60'	Stadium: Tele2 Arena; Attendance: 27,203; Referee: (Sweden) Mohammed Al-Hakim

11 July 2022 Match 14	Helsingborg	0 - 2	Djurgården	Helsingborg
19:00 CEST	Loeper (red card) 39'; Amoako (yellow card) 67'; Tsouka (yellow card) 90+1'	Report	Edvardsen 29'; Wikheim 62' (yellow card) 90+1'	Stadium: Olympia; Attendance: 10,127; Referee: (Sweden) Granit Maqedonci

16 July 2022 Match 15	Djurgården	5 - 0	Värnamo	Stockholm
17:30 CEST	Radetinac 15'; Eriksson 30' 67'; Banda 52'; Edvardsen 90+1'	Report		Stadium: Tele2 Arena; Attendance: 16,143; Referee: (Sweden) Glenn Nyberg

24 July 2022 Match 16	Häcken	1 - 2	Djurgården	Gothenburg
17:30 CEST	Friðriksson (yellow card) 25'; Jeremejeff 34' (pen.); Lund (yellow card) 45+3'	Report	Finndell (yellow card) 32'; Banda 49' (yellow card) 90+5'; Andersson 63'	Stadium: Bravida Arena; Attendance: 6,316; Referee: (Sweden) Andreas Ekberg

===== August =====
7 August 2022 Match 17	Värnamo	0 - 0	Djurgården	Värnamo
17:30 CEST	Edvardsson (yellow card) 90+4'	Report		Stadium: Finnvedsvallen; Attendance: 4,790; Referee: (Sweden) Mohammed Al-Hakim

14 August 2022 Match 18	Djurgården	3 - 2	Kalmar	Stockholm
15:00 CEST	Wikheim 14' 40' (yellow card) 67'; Asoro 52'; Doumbouya (yellow card) 90+3'	Report	Ólafsson (yellow card) 33'; Netabay (yellow card) 71'; Sachpekidis 77'; Bjerkebo 88'	Stadium: Tele2 Arena; Attendance: 17,107; Referee: (Sweden) Fredrik Klitte

20 August 2022 Match 19	Varberg	2 - 2	Djurgården	Varberg
15:00 CEST	Sissé 11' (yellow card) 13' (yellow-red card) 46'; Johansson 39'; Tranberg (yellow card) 53'; Andersson (yellow card) 89'	Report	Finndell (yellow card) 20'; Šabović 51' (yellow card) 52'; Radetinac 90+3'	Stadium: Varberg Energi Arena; Attendance: 3,548; Referee: (Sweden) Victor Wolf

29 August 2022 Match 20	Djurgården	2 - 1	Elfsborg	Stockholm
19:00 CEST	Ekdal 10'; Andersson (yellow card) 23'; Finndell 26'; Radetinac (yellow card) 76'; Danielson (yellow card) 88'	Report	Frick (yellow card) 12'; Strand (yellow card) 23'; Henriksson (yellow card) 72'; Ondrejka 81'; Bernhardsson (yellow card) 90'; Rømer (yellow card) 90+5'	Stadium: Tele2 Arena; Attendance: 16,113; Referee: (Sweden) Bojan Pandžić

===== September =====
4 September 2022 Match 21	Sirius	0 - 1	Djurgården	Uppsala
15:00 CEST	Roche (yellow card) 13'; Sylisufaj (yellow card) 53'; Mathisen (yellow card) 90+9'; Kouakou (yellow card) 90+9'	Report	Wikheim 27'; Schüller (yellow card) 34'; Edvardsen (yellow card) 37'; Johansson (yellow card) 57'; Löfgren (yellow card) 90+9'	Stadium: Studenternas IP; Attendance: 9,530; Referee: (Sweden) Kristoffer Karlsson

11 September 2022 Match 22	Hammarby	0 - 0	Djurgården	Stockholm
15:00 CEST	Kurtulus (yellow card) 31'	Report		Stadium: Tele2 Arena; Attendance: 27,987; Referee: (Sweden) Mohammed Al-Hakim

18 September 2022 Match 23	Djurgården	3 - 0	Göteborg	Stockholm
17:30 CEST	Edvardsen 30' 37' (pen.) 68' (pen.); Eriksson (yellow card) 46'	Report	Svensson (yellow card) 56'	Stadium: Tele2 Arena; Attendance: 21,735; Referee: (Sweden) Joakim Östling

===== October =====
1 October 2022 Match 24	Degerfors	3 - 0	Djurgården	Degerfors
17:30 CEST	Faraj 29'; Ohlsson (yellow card) 45+2'; Danielson 48' (o.g.); Bertilsson 85'	Report	Wikheim (yellow card) 72'; Šabović (yellow card) 90'; Andersson (yellow card) 90+3'	Stadium: Stora Valla; Attendance: 5,880; Referee: (Sweden) Bojan Pandžić

9 October 2022 Match 25	Djurgården	0 - 1	Häcken	Stockholm
17:30 CEST	Edvardsen (yellow card) 45'	Report	Larsen 40'; Abrahamsson (yellow card) 90+2'; Friberg (yellow card) 90+4'	Stadium: Tele2 Arena; Attendance: 26,274; Referee: (Sweden) Glenn Nyberg

16 October 2022 Match 26	Djurgården	1 - 2	AIK	Stockholm
15:00 CEST	Löfgren (yellow card) 5'; Holmberg 90+4'	Report	Guidetti 10'; Larsson (yellow card) 14'; Otieno (yellow card) 27'; Hussein (yellow card) 45+3'; Stefanelli 61'; Sichenje (red card) 90+4'	Stadium: Tele2 Arena; Attendance: 26,702; Referee: (Sweden) Andreas Ekberg

20 October 2022 Match 27	Malmö	2 - 3	Djurgården	Malmö
19:00 CEST	Rakip 5' (yellow card) 59'; Kiese Thelin (yellow card) 13'; Rieks 26'; Christiansen (yellow card) 69'; Knudsen (red card) 90+1'	Report	Andersson 52'; Holmberg 62'; Danielson 90+2'; Johansson (yellow card) 90+8'	Stadium: Eleda Stadion; Attendance: 16,703; Referee: (Sweden) Fredrik Klitte

24 October 2022 Match 28	Djurgården	4 - 0	Sundsvall	Stockholm
19:10 CEST	Wikheim 6'; Finndell 16' (yellow card) 52'; Stenshagen 46' (o.g.); Eriksson 90+2'	Report	Lundström (yellow card) 31'; Blomqvist (yellow card) 57'; Corona (yellow card) 67'	Stadium: Tele2 Arena; Attendance: 15,292; Referee: (Sweden) Granit Maqedonci

31 October 2022 Match 29	Norrköping	0 - 1	Djurgården	Norrköping
19:10 CET	Wahlqvist (yellow card) 20'; Sigurðsson (yellow card) 70'	Report	Johansson (yellow card) 87'; Radetinac 90+7'	Stadium: PlatinumCars Arena; Attendance: 11,622; Referee: (Sweden) Victor Wolf

===== November =====
6 November 2022 Match 30	Djurgården	0 - 1	Mjällby	Stockholm
15:00 CET	Andersson (yellow card) 66'	Report	Al-Ammari 23' (yellow card) 63'; Johansson (yellow card) 68'	Stadium: Tele2 Arena; Attendance: 25,426; Referee: (Sweden) Adam Ladebäck

=== 2021–22 Svenska Cupen ===
==== Matches ====
===== Group stage =====
Pos	Team	Pld	W	D	L	GF	GA	GD	Pts	Qualification	DIF	BP	IKB	HBK
1	Djurgårdens IF (Q)	3	2	1	0	5	1	+4	7	Advance to Knockout Stage			1–0	1–1
2	IF Brommapojkarna	3	1	1	1	3	5	−2	4		0–3			1–1
3	IK Brage	3	1	0	2	2	3	−1	3			1–2		
4	Halmstads BK	3	0	2	1	2	3	−1	2				0–1	

Updated to match(es) played on unknown. Source: Swedish Football Association
Rules for classification: 1) Points; 2) Goal difference; 3) Goals scored; 4) Head-to-head record; 5) Highest ranked team
(Q) Qualified for the phase indicated

21 February 2022 Match 1	Djurgården	1 - 0	IK Brage	Stockholm
19:10 CET	Edvardsen 77'	Report		Stadium: Tele2 Arena; Attendance: 6,559; Referee: (Sweden) Mohammed Al-Hakim

27 February 2022 Match 2	IF Brommapojkarna	0 - 3	Djurgården	Vällingby
13:00 CET	Jelassi (yellow card) 45'; Tesfai (yellow card) 52'; Frej (yellow card) 71'	Report	Edvardsen 1' (yellow card) 71'; Ekdal (yellow card) 31'; Sögaard 41' (o.g.); Eriksson (yellow card) 45'; Schüller 45+2'	Stadium: Grimsta IP; Attendance: 1,536; Referee: (Sweden) Joakim Östling

5 March 2022 Match 3	Djurgården	1 - 1	Halmstads BK	Stockholm
13:00 CET	Johansson 63'; Edvardsen (yellow card) 68'	Report	Karlsson (yellow card) 13'; Alexander Johansson 84'	Stadium: Tele2 Arena; Attendance: 7,097; Referee: (Sweden) Victor Wolf

===== Quarter-final =====
12 March 2022 Quarter Final	Kalmar FF	0 - 2	Djurgården	Kalmar
13:00 CET	Sjöstedt (yellow card) 71'	Report	Radetinac 31'; Johansson 36' (yellow card) 73'; Finndell (yellow card) 65'	Stadium: Guldfågeln Arena; Attendance: 2,816; Referee: (Sweden) Kaspar Sjöberg

===== Semi-final =====
20 March 2022 Semi Final	Djurgården	0 - 1	Malmö FF	Stockholm
14:00 CET	Banda (yellow card) 53'; Finndell (yellow card) 84'	Report	Rakip (yellow card) 17'; Christiansen (yellow card) 28'; Thelin 33'; Peña (yellow card) 84'	Stadium: Tele2 Arena; Attendance: 16,511; Referee: (Sweden) Mohammed Al-Hakim

=== 2022–23 Svenska Cupen ===
Djurgården were drawn away at Örebro Syrianska in the 2nd round of the 2022-23 Svenska Cupen on 10 July 2022.

==== Qualification ====
1 September 2022 Round 2	Örebro Syrianska	0 - 3	Djurgården	Örebro
19:00 CEST	Gustafsson (yellow card) 36' (yellow-red card) 77'	Report	Garcia Tsotidis 34'; Šabović 78' (pen.); Andersson 82' (pen.)	Stadium: Behrn Arena; Attendance: 2,235; Referee: (Sweden) Fredrik Alknäs

=== 2022–23 Europa Conference League ===
==== Qualifying ====
Djurgården entered the 2022-23 Europa Conference League at the 2nd Qualifying Round after finishing 3rd in the 2021 Allsvenskan. Djurgården were drawn against Rijeka of Croatia, with the 1st leg away.

The 3rd Qualifying Round draw was made on Monday 18 July, which drew the winner of the tie against Rijeka with either Sepsi Sfântu Gheorghe of Romania or Olimpija Ljubljana of Slovenia, with the first leg away from home.

The Play-off Round draw was made on Tuesday 2 August, which drew the winner of the tie against Sepsi Sfântu Gheorghe with either APOEL of Cyprus or Kyzylzhar of Kazakhstan, with the first leg away from home. The order of matches was reversed due to Apollon Limassol reaching the Play-off round of the 2022–23 UEFA Europa League.

All qualifying round draws were made at the UEFA headquarters in Nyon, Switzerland.

===== Matches =====
21 July 2022 2nd Qualifying Round 1st leg	HNK Rijeka (Croatia)	1 - 2	(Sweden) Djurgården	Rijeka
20:30 CEST	Vučkić 13'; Krešić (yellow card) 77'; Pavlović (yellow card) 81'	Report	Finndell 38'; Edvardsen 54'; Hien (yellow card) 80'; Andersson (yellow card) 90+3'	Stadium: Stadion HNK Rijeka; Attendance: 6,473; Referee: Christian-Petru Ciochirca (Austria)

28 July 2022 2nd Qualifying Round 2nd leg	Djurgården (Sweden)	2 - 0	(Croatia) HNK Rijeka	Stockholm
19:00 CEST	Asoro (yellow card) 29'; Hien 55'; Schüller (yellow card) 67'; Edvardsen (yellow card) 75'; Banda 84'; Radetinac (yellow card) 90+6'	Report	Hodža (yellow card) 29'; Pavlović (yellow card) 90+6'	Stadium: Tele2 Arena; Attendance: 18,605; Referee: Snir Levi (Israel)

Djurgården won 4–1 on aggregate.

4 August 2022 3rd Qualifying Round 1st leg	Sepsi Sfântu Gheorghe (Romania)	1 - 3	(Sweden) Djurgården	Sfântu Gheorghe
21:00 EEST	Aganović (yellow card) 25'; Mitrea (yellow card) 31'; Rodríguez (yellow card) 63'; Tudorie 79' (pen.); Damașcan (yellow card) 80'	Report	Edvardsen 26' (pen.); Asoro 31' 53'; Finndell (yellow card) 36'; Zetterström (yellow card) 90+4'	Stadium: Stadionul Sepsi Arena; Attendance: 6,632; Referee: Paweł Raczkowski (Poland)

11 August 2022 3rd Qualifying Round 2nd leg	Djurgården (Sweden)	3 - 1	(Romania) Sepsi Sfântu Gheorghe	Stockholm
19:00 CEST	Edvardsen (yellow card) 1'; Finndell 12'; Asoro 23' 71'; Danielson (yellow card) 89'	Report	Matei 8'; Păun (yellow card) 21'; Niňaj (yellow card) 79'; Mitrea (yellow card) 83'; Rodríguez (yellow card) 86'	Stadium: Tele2 Arena; Attendance: 19,280; Referee: Sascha Stegemann (Germany)

Djurgården won 6–2 on aggregate.

17 August 2022 Play-off Round 1st leg	Djurgården (Sweden)	3 - 0	(Cyprus) APOEL	Stockholm
18:45 CEST	Edvardsen 9'; Schüller (yellow card) 45' (yellow-red card) 71'; Ekdal 54' (yellow card) 88'; Wikheim 65'; Radetinac (yellow card) 76'; Zetterström (yellow card) 84'; Andersson (yellow card) 85'	Report	Chebake (yellow card) 37'; Crespo (red card) 90+4'	Stadium: Tele2 Arena; Attendance: 19,122; Referee: Juxhin Xhaja (Albania)

23 August 2022 Play-off Round 2nd leg	APOEL (Cyprus)	3 - 2	(Sweden) Djurgården	Nicosia
19:00 EEST	Blum (yellow card) 2' (goal) 23'; Maglica 7' (yellow card) 72'; Chebake (yellow card) 10'; Theodorou (yellow card) 24'; Ndongala (yellow card) 36'; Villafáñez (yellow card) 53'; Marquinhos 74' (yellow card) 90+2'; Kostadinov (yellow card) 75'; Karo (yellow card) 90+6'	Report	Edvardsen (yellow card) 31'; Šabović (yellow card) 55'; Andersson 68'; Asoro 90+1' (yellow card) 90+1'; Eriksson (yellow card) 90+6'	Stadium: GSP Stadium; Attendance: 12,824; Referee: Roi Reinshreiber (Israel)

Djurgården won 5–3 on aggregate.

==== Group stage ====
Djurgården made the group stage, and were placed in pot 4 for the draw as the 4th lowest ranked team left in the competition.

The group stage draw was made in Istanbul, Turkey on Friday 26 August, and drew Djurgården in Group F with K.A.A. Gent of Belgium, Molde FK of Norway, and Shamrock Rovers F.C. of Republic of Ireland. The fixtures were announced on Saturday 27 August.

Pos	Team	Pld	W	D	L	GF	GA	GD	Pts	Qualification	(Sweden) DIF	(Belgium) GNT	(Norway) MOL	(Republic of Ireland) SHA
1	(Sweden) Djurgården	6	5	1	0	12	6	+6	16	Advance to round of 16		4-2	3-2	1-0
2	(Belgium) Gent	6	2	2	2	10	6	+4	8	Advance to knockout round play-offs	0-1		4-0	3-0
3	(Norway) Molde	6	2	1	3	9	10	−1	7		2-3	0-0		3-0
4	(Republic of Ireland) Shamrock Rovers	6	0	2	4	1	10	−9	2		0-0	1-1	0-2	

Updated to match(es) played on 3 November 2022. Source: UEFA
Rules for classification: Group stage tiebreakers

===== Matches =====
8 September 2022 1	Shamrock Rovers (Republic of Ireland)	0 - 0	(Sweden) Djurgården	Dublin
20:00 IST	Ferizaj (yellow card) 49'; Gaffney (yellow card) 84'	Report	Schüller (yellow card) 80'	Stadium: Tallaght Stadium; Attendance: 6,330; Referee: Ívar Orri Kristjánsson (Iceland)

15 September 2022 2	Djurgården (Sweden)	3 - 2	(Norway) Molde	Stockholm
18:45 CEST	Edvardsen (yellow card) 40'; Doumbouya 50'; Banda 58'; Asoro 90+1' (yellow card) 90+2'	Report	Fofana 39' (pen.) (yellow card) 39' (yellow-red card) 57'; Grødem (yellow card) 66'; Breivik 77'; Eriksen (yellow card) 83'; Mannsverk (yellow card) 89'	Stadium: Tele2 Arena; Attendance: 16,673; Referee: Gergő Bogár (Hungary)

6 October 2022 3	Gent (Belgium)	0 - 1	(Sweden) Djurgården	Ghent
21:00 CEST		Report	Danielson 37'; Finndell (yellow card) 67'; Asoro (yellow card) 73'; Edvardsen (yellow card) 90+4'	Stadium: Ghelamco Arena; Attendance: 10,896; Referee: Aleksei Kulbakov (Belarus)

13 October 2022 4	Djurgården (Sweden)	4 - 2	(Belgium) Gent	Stockholm
18:45 CEST	Holmberg 21'; Johansson (yellow card) 37'; Wikheim 42' 46'; Banda 45+4'	Report	Depoitre 61'; Cuypers (yellow card) 66' (goal) 73'; Fortuna (yellow card) 90+2'	Stadium: Tele2 Arena; Attendance: 16,822; Referee: Manfredas Lukjančukas (Lithuania)

27 October 2022 5	Molde (Norway)	2 - 3	(Sweden) Djurgården	Molde
21:00 CEST	Brynhildsen 5' (yellow card) 70'; Kaasa 21'; Risa (yellow card) 45'; Breivik (yellow card) 59'; Løvik (yellow card) 65'	Report	Edvardsen 44'; Schüller (yellow card) 58'; Asoro 67'; Radetinac 77'	Stadium: Aker Stadion; Attendance: 5,545; Referee: Urs Schnyder (Switzerland)

3 November 2022 6	Djurgården (Sweden)	1 - 0	(Republic of Ireland) Shamrock Rovers	Stockholm
18:45 CET	Eriksson 19'; Schüller (yellow card) 88'; Ademi (yellow card) 90+1'	Report	Cleary (yellow card) 28'; Byrne (yellow card) 71'; Gannon (yellow card) 78'	Stadium: Tele2 Arena; Attendance: 16,726; Referee: Nick Walsh (Scotland)

==== Round of 16 ====
Djurgården finished top of Group F and qualified for the round of 16 with the matches to be played in the 2023 season.

== Statistics ==
=== Appearances ===
Last updated: 6 November 2022.

No.	Pos.	Name	Allsvenskan		Svenska Cupen 2021/22		Svenska Cupen 2022/23		Europa Conference League		Total	
No.	Pos.	Name	Apps	Goals	Apps	Goals	Apps	Goals	Apps	Goals	Apps	Goals
Goalkeepers
15	GK	(Russia) Aleksandr Vasyutin	2	0	1	0	1	0	3	0	7	0
35	GK	(Sweden) Jacob Widell Zetterström	28	0	4	0	0	0	9	0	41	0
Defenders
2	DF	(Sweden) Piotr Johansson	27+1	0	5	2	0+1	0	12	0	44+2	2
3	DF	(Sweden) Hjalmar Ekdal	23+1	3	5	0	0+1	0	10+1	1	38+3	4
4	DF	(Sweden) Jesper Löfgren	10+11	0	2	0	1	0	2+5	0	15+16	0
5	DF	(Sweden) Elliot Käck	0+1	0	0+1	0	0	0	0	0	0+2	0
19	DF	(Sweden) Pierre Bengtsson	13+4	0	5	0	1	0	6+2	0	25+6	0
33	DF	(Sweden) Marcus Danielson	12+1	1	0	0	1	0	6+4	1	19+5	2
Midfielders
6	MF	(Finland) Rasmus Schüller	23	1	5	1	0	0	9+1	0	37+1	2
7	MF	(Sweden) Magnus Eriksson	28+1	3	5	0	0	0	11+1	1	44+2	4
8	MF	(Sweden) Elias Andersson	16+9	2	0+1	0	0+1	1	6+4	1	22+15	4
9	MF	(Bosnia and Herzegovina) Haris Radetinac	23+6	5	5	1	1	0	8+4	1	37+10	7
11	MF	(Albania) Albion Ademi	0+3	0	0+3	0	0	0	0+2	0	0+8	0
12	MF	(Zambia) Emmanuel Banda	8+19	4	1+1	0	1	0	3+9	3	13+29	7
13	MF	(Sweden) Hampus Finndell	26+1	5	5	0	0+1	0	10+1	2	41+3	7
14	MF	(Sweden) Besard Šabović	3+9	1	0	0	1	1	3+4	0	7+13	2
23	MF	(Norway) Gustav Wikheim	15+11	6	1+2	0	0	0	5+6	3	21+19	9
25	MF	(Guinea) Amadou Doumbouya	3+5	0	0	0	1	0	1+3	1	5+8	1
32	MF	(Sweden) Isak Alemayehu Mulugeta	0+1	0	0	0	0	0	0	0	0+1	0
Forwards
10	FW	(Sweden) Joel Asoro	15+14	6	1+2	0	0+1	0	10+2	7	26+19	13
16	FW	(Sweden) Victor Edvardsen	25+3	9	5	2	1	0	10+2	4	41+5	15
17	FW	(Sweden) Kalle Holmberg	3+11	2	2+2	0	1	0	2+1	1	8+14	3
31	FW	(Sweden) Alexandros Garcia Tsotidis	0+1	0	0	0	1	1	0	0	1+1	1
Players no longer at the club
18	DF	(Sweden) Isak Hien	14+3	2	3+1	0	0	0	6	1	23+4	3
22	DF	(Norway) Leo Cornic	2+3	0	0	0	0	0	0	0	2+3	0
27	DF	(Sweden) Melker Jonsson	0+1	0	0+2	0	0	0	0	0	0+3	0
99	MF	(Montenegro) Sead Hakšabanović	11	2	0	0	0	0	0	0	11	2

=== Goalscorers ===
The list is sorted by shirt number when total goals are equal.

Rnk	Pos	No.	Player	Allsvenskan	Svenska Cupen 2021/22	Svenska Cupen 2022/23	Europa Conference League	Total
1	FW	16	(Sweden) Victor Edvardsen	9	2	0	4	15
2	FW	10	(Sweden) Joel Asoro	6	0	0	7	13
3	MF	23	(Norway) Gustav Wikheim	6	0	0	3	9
4	MF	9	(Bosnia and Herzegovina) Haris Radetinac	5	1	0	1	7
4	MF	12	(Zambia) Emmanuel Banda	4	0	0	3	7
4	MF	13	(Sweden) Hampus Finndell	5	0	0	2	7
7	DF	3	(Sweden) Hjalmar Ekdal	3	0	0	1	4
7	MF	7	(Sweden) Magnus Eriksson	3	0	0	1	4
7	MF	8	(Sweden) Elias Andersson	2	0	1	1	4
10	FW	17	(Sweden) Kalle Holmberg	2	0	0	1	3
10	DF	18	(Sweden) Isak Hien	2	0	0	1	3
12	DF	2	(Sweden) Piotr Johansson	0	2	0	0	2
12	MF	6	(Finland) Rasmus Schüller	1	1	0	0	2
12	MF	14	(Sweden) Besard Šabović	1	0	1	0	2
12	DF	33	(Sweden) Marcus Danielson	1	0	0	1	2
12	MF	99	(Montenegro) Sead Hakšabanović	2	0	0	0	2
17	MF	25	(Guinea) Amadou Doumbouya	0	0	0	1	1
17	FW	31	(Sweden) Alexandros Garcia Tsotidis	0	0	1	0	1
Total				52	6	3	26	87

==== Hat-tricks ====
Player	Against	Competition	Minutes	Score after goals	Result	Date
(Sweden) Victor Edvardsen	(Sweden) IFK Göteborg	Allsvenskan	30', 37', 68'	1–0, 2–0, 3–0	3–0 (H)	18 September 2022

==== Own goals ====
Player	Against	Competition	Minute	Score after own goal	Result	Date
(Sweden) Marcus Danielson	(Sweden) Degerfors IF	Allsvenskan	48'	2-0	3–0 (A)	1 October 2022

=== Disciplinary ===
Updated 6 November 2022
The list is sorted by shirt number when total cards are equal.

Rnk	Pos	No.	Name	Allsvenskan			Svenska Cupen 2021/22			Svenska Cupen 2022/23			Europa Conference League			Total		
Rnk	Pos	No.	Name	Yellow card	Second yellow card	Red card	Yellow card	Second yellow card	Red card	Yellow card	Second yellow card	Red card	Yellow card	Second yellow card	Red card	Yellow card	Second yellow card	Red card
1	FW	16	(Sweden) Victor Edvardsen	4	0	0	2	0	0	0	0	0	5	0	0	11	0	0
2	MF	6	(Finland) Rasmus Schüller	4	0	0	0	0	0	0	0	0	4	1	0	8	1	0
3	DF	2	(Sweden) Piotr Johansson	7	0	0	1	0	0	0	0	0	1	0	0	9	0	0
3	MF	13	(Sweden) Hampus Finndell	5	0	0	2	0	0	0	0	0	2	0	0	9	0	0
5	MF	8	(Sweden) Elias Andersson	4	0	0	0	0	0	0	0	0	2	0	0	6	0	0
5	FW	10	(Sweden) Joel Asoro	2	0	0	0	0	0	0	0	0	4	0	0	6	0	0
7	DF	3	(Sweden) Hjalmar Ekdal	2	0	0	1	0	0	0	0	0	1	0	0	4	0	0
7	MF	7	(Sweden) Magnus Eriksson	2	0	0	1	0	0	0	0	0	1	0	0	4	0	0
7	MF	9	(Bosnia and Herzegovina) Haris Radetinac	2	0	0	0	0	0	0	0	0	2	0	0	4	0	0
7	MF	23	(Norway) Gustav Wikheim	4	0	0	0	0	0	0	0	0	0	0	0	4	0	0
11	MF	14	(Sweden) Besard Šabović	2	0	0	0	0	0	0	0	0	1	0	0	3	0	0
11	DF	18	(Sweden) Isak Hien	2	0	0	0	0	0	0	0	0	1	0	0	3	0	0
13	DF	4	(Sweden) Jesper Löfgren	2	0	0	0	0	0	0	0	0	0	0	0	2	0	0
13	MF	12	(Zambia) Emmanuel Banda	1	0	0	1	0	0	0	0	0	0	0	0	2	0	0
13	DF	33	(Sweden) Marcus Danielson	1	0	0	0	0	0	0	0	0	1	0	0	2	0	0
13	GK	35	(Sweden) Jacob Widell Zetterström	0	0	0	0	0	0	0	0	0	2	0	0	2	0	0
17	MF	11	(Albania) Albion Ademi	0	0	0	0	0	0	0	0	0	1	0	0	1	0	0
17	DF	19	(Sweden) Pierre Bengtsson	1	0	0	0	0	0	0	0	0	0	0	0	1	0	0
17	MF	25	(Guinea) Amadou Doumbouya	1	0	0	0	0	0	0	0	0	0	0	0	1	0	0
Total				46	0	0	8	0	0	0	0	0	29	1	0	82	1	0

=== Clean sheets ===
The list is sorted by shirt number when total clean sheets are equal.

Rnk	No.	Player	Allsvenskan	Svenska Cupen 2021/22	Svenska Cupen 2022/23	Europa Conference League	Total
1	35	(Sweden) Jacob Widell Zetterström	12	3	0	4	19
2	15	(Russia) Aleksandr Vasyutin	1	0	1	1	3
Total			13	3	1	5	22
