= 2021 Djurgårdens IF season =

Djurgårdens IF Fotboll
2021 season
- Chairman: Lars-Erik Sjöberg
- Manager: Kim Bergstrand; Thomas Lagerlöf
- Stadium: Tele2 Arena
- Allsvenskan: 3rd
- 2020–21 Svenska Cupen: Semi-finals
- 2021–22 Svenska Cupen: Group stage
- Top goalscorer: League: Edward Chilufya (8); All: Edward Chilufya (14)
- Highest home attendance: 23,227 v Varberg; 28 November 2021
- Biggest win: 7-0 v Umeå; 28 February 2021
- Biggest defeat: 1-4 v AIK; 8 August 2021; 0-3 v Elfsborg; 18 October 2021; 3-0 v IFK Göteborg; 28 October 2021
Home colours	Away colours	Third colours

The 2021 season was Djurgårdens IF's 121st in existence, their 66th season in Allsvenskan and their 21st consecutive season in the league. In addition to the Allsvenskan, they competed in the 2020-21 and 2021–22 editions of the Svenska Cupen.

== Squad ==
=== Season squad ===
Squad No.	Name	Nationality	Position	Date of birth (age)	Previous club
Goalkeepers
15	Aleksandr Vasyutin (On loan from Zenit)	(Russia)	GK	4 March 1995 (age 31)	(Russia) Zenit Saint Petersburg
30	Tommi Vaiho	(Sweden)	GK	13 September 1988 (age 38)	(Sweden) GAIS
35	Jacob Widell Zetterström	(Sweden)	GK	11 July 1998 (age 28)	(Sweden) IFK Lidingö
Defenders
2	Jesper Nyholm	(Philippines)	DF	10 September 1993 (age 33)	(Sweden) AIK
3	Hjalmar Ekdal	(Sweden)	DF	21 October 1998 (age 28)	(Sweden) Hammarby
4	Jacob Une Larsson	(Sweden)	DF	8 April 1994 (age 32)	(Sweden) IF Brommapojkarna
5	Elliot Käck	(Sweden)	DF	18 September 1989 (age 37)	(Norway) IK Start
16	Jesper Löfgren	(Sweden)	DF	3 May 1997 (age 29)	(Norway) SK Brann
22	Leo Cornic	(Norway)	DF	2 January 2001 (age 25)	(Norway) Grorud IL
26	Linus Tagesson	(Sweden)	DF	11 February 2002 (age 24)	(Sweden) IFK Österåker
27	Melker Jonsson	(Sweden)	DF	10 July 2002 (age 24)	(Sweden) IFK Lidingö
Midfielders
6	Rasmus Schüller	(Finland)	MF	18 June 1991 (age 35)	(Finland) HJK Helsinki
7	Magnus Eriksson (C)	(Sweden)	MF	8 April 1990 (age 36)	(United States) San Jose Earthquakes
9	Haris Radetinac	(Bosnia and Herzegovina)	MF	28 October 1985 (age 41)	(Sweden) Mjällby AIF
11	Albion Ademi	(Albania)	MF	19 February 1999 (age 27)	(Finland) IFK Mariehamn
12	Emmanuel Banda	(Zambia)	MF	29 September 1997 (age 29)	(Belgium) Oostende
13	Hampus Finndell	(Sweden)	MF	6 June 2000 (age 26)	(Netherlands) FC Groningen
14	Edward Chilufya	(Zambia)	MF	17 September 1999 (age 27)	(Zambia) Mpande Academy
19	Nicklas Bärkroth	(Sweden)	MF	19 January 1992 (age 34)	(Poland) Lech Poznań
24	Curtis Edwards	(England)	MF	12 January 1994 (age 32)	(Sweden) Östersund
28	Kofi Asare	(Sweden)	MF	31 May 2002 (age 24)	(Sweden) Hammarby
Forwards
10	Joel Asoro	(Sweden)	FW	27 April 1999 (age 27)	(England) Swansea City
17	Kalle Holmberg	(Sweden)	FW	3 March 1993 (age 33)	(Sweden) IFK Norrköping
20	Emir Kujović	(Sweden)	FW	22 June 1988 (age 38)	(Germany) Fortuna Düsseldorf

Last updated: 20 August 2021.
Source: []

== Transfers ==
=== Loans in ===
Date from	Position	Nationality	Name	From	Date until	Ref.
11 February 2021	GK	(Russia)	Aleksandr Vasyutin	(Russia) Zenit Saint Petersburg	31 December 2021	

=== Loans out ===
Date from	Position	Nationality	Name	To	Date until
3 January 2021	GK	(Norway)	Per Kristian Bråtveit	(Netherlands) Groningen	29 June 2021
16 January 2021	FW	(Sweden)	Adam Bergmark Wiberg	(Sweden) Falkenbergs FF	29 November 2021
30 June 2021	GK	(Norway)	Per Kristian Bråtveit	(France) Nîmes	30 June 2022
30 June 2021	DF	(Sweden)	Isak Hien	(Sweden) Vasalund	29 November 2021
30 July 2021	FW	(Jamaica)	Peter McGregor	(Sweden) Åtvidabergs FF	31 December 2021
29 July 2021	MF	(Sweden)	Mattias Mitku	(Sweden) IFK Haninge	29 November 2021
29 July 2021	DF	(Sweden)	Axel Wallenborg	(Sweden) IFK Haninge	29 November 2021
8 August 2021	MF	(Sweden)	Elias Andersson	(Sweden) Mjällby AIF	30 December 2021
28 October 2021	MF	(Sweden)	Kofi Asare	(Sweden) IFK Haninge	14 November 2021

=== Transfers in ===
Date from	Position	Nationality	Name	From	Fee	Ref.
1 January 2021	MF	(Sweden)	Elias Andersson	(Sweden) IK Sirius	Free	
1 January 2021	DF	(Sweden)	Isak Hien	(Sweden) Vasalunds IF	Free	
1 January 2021	MF	(Finland)	Rasmus Schüller	(Finland) HJK Helsinki	Free	
1 January 2021	DF	(Sweden)	Axel Wallenborg	(Sweden) IF Brommapojkarna	Undisclosed	
8 January 2021	DF	(Norway)	Leo Cornic	(Norway) Grorud IL	Undisclosed	
8 January 2021	DF	(Sweden)	Hjalmar Ekdal	(Sweden) Hammarby	£63,000	
21 January 2021	MF	(Albania)	Albion Ademi	(Finland) IFK Mariehamn	£180,000	
8 February 2021	FW	(Sweden)	Joel Asoro	(England) Swansea	£630,000	
17 March 2021	GK	(Sweden)	Jacob Widell Zetterström	Free Agent	Free	
31 March 2021	DF	(Sweden)	Jesper Löfgren	(Norway) Brann	Undisclosed	

=== Transfers out ===
Date from	Position	Nationality	Name	To	Fee	Ref.
1 January 2021	MF	(Sweden)	Jonathan Ring	(Sweden) Kalmar FF	Free	
1 January 2021	MF	(Sweden)	Jesper Karlström	(Poland) Lech Poznań	£720,000	
1 January 2021	DF	(Sweden)	Alexander Abrahamsson	(Sweden) Akropolis IF	Free	
7 January 2021	MF	(Sweden)	Kevin Walker	(Sweden) Örebro	Free	
13 January 2021	DF	(Sweden)	Johan Andersson	(Sweden) GAIS	Undisclosed	
14 January 2021	DF	(Sweden)	Jonathan Augustinsson	(Norway) Rosenborg	Undisclosed	
20 January 2021	GK	(Norway)	Erland Tangvik	(Norway) Ranheim	Free	
27 January 2021	FW	(Sweden)	Oscar Pettersson	(Sweden) Akropolis IF	Free	
3 February 2021	MF	(Norway)	Fredrik Ulvestad	(China) Qingdao	Free	
7 February 2021	MF	(Sweden)	Oliver Granberg	(Sweden) Täby	Undisclosed	
26 February 2021	MF	(Sweden)	Dženis Kozica	(Sweden) Trelleborgs FF	Undisclosed	
28 February 2021	MF	(Bosnia and Herzegovina)	Melvin Bajrovic	(Sweden) Hammarby	Undisclosed	
3 May 2021	DF	(Sweden)	Anthonio Sanjairag	(Thailand) Chonburi	Free	
10 June 2021	DF	(Sweden)	Erik Berg	Retired	N/A	
9 August 2021	DF	(Norway)	Aslak Fonn Witry	(Netherlands) AZ Alkmaar	£1,580,000	

== Competitions ==
=== Overview ===
Competition	First match	Last match	Starting round	Final position	Record							
Competition	First match	Last match	Starting round	Final position	Pld	W	D	L	GF	GA	GD	Win %
Allsvenskan	11 April 2021	5 December 2021	Matchday 1	3rd	30	17	6	7	46	30	+16	56.67
Svenska Cupen 2020/21	19 November 2020	4 April 2021	Round 2	Semi-final	5	4	0	1	15	2	+13	80.00
Svenska Cupen 2021/22	18 August 2021	20 March 2022	Round 2	Semi-final	1	1	0	0	4	0	+4	100.00
Total					36	22	6	8	65	32	+33	61.11

Last updated: 26 May 2022
Source: Soccerway

=== Club Friendlies ===
30 January 2021 Friendly	(Sweden) Akropolis	0 - 5	(Sweden) Djurgården	Stockholm
15:00		Report	Bärkroth 13'; Cornic 59'; Finndell 67' 89'; Mitku 84'	Stadium: Grimsta IP

6 February 2021 Friendly	(Sweden) Brommapojkarna	3 - 1	(Sweden) Djurgården	Stockholm
14:00	Cosic 81'; Faraj 84'; Jelassi 90'	Report	Une Larsson 45'	Stadium: Grimsta IP

7 February 2021 Friendly	(Sweden) Djurgården	0 - 2	(Sweden) Vasalund	Stockholm
17:00		Report	El Mezouak 3'; Durmaz 54'	Stadium: Tele2 Arena

13 February 2021 Friendly	(Sweden) Djurgården	4 - 0	(Sweden) Örebro	Stockholm
15:00	Witry 26'; Radetinac 36' 64'; Kujović 90+2'	Report		Stadium: Tele2 Arena

24 February 2021 Friendly	(Sweden) Sirius	2 - 6	(Sweden) Djurgården	Uppsala
15:00	S Wikman 63'; A Wikman 72'	Report	Ademi 25'; Banda 37'; Jonsson 40'; Bärkroth 59'; Edwards 60'; Asare 90'	Stadium: Studenternas IP

20 March 2021 Friendly	(Sweden) Djurgården	3 - 0	(Sweden) Östersunds FK	Stockholm
13:00	Asoro 52'; Kujović 69' 89'	Report		Stadium: Tele2 Arena

23 March 2021 Friendly	(Sweden) Djurgården	3 - 2	(Sweden) Degerfors	Stockholm
14:00	Andersson 30'; Witry 45' (pen.); Kujović 64'	Report	Gravius 44'; Edvardsen 51'	Stadium: Tele2 Arena

5 April 2021 Friendly	(Sweden) Brage	1 - 3	(Sweden) Djurgården	Borlänge
14:00	Johansson 48'	Report	Kujović 45+1' 76'; Cornic 63'	Stadium: Domnarvsvallen

19 June 2021 Friendly	(Sweden) Djurgården	2 - 3	(Sweden) Kalmar	Stockholm
15:00	Radetinac 12'; Cornic 30'	Report	Berg 29' 40'; Fröling 63'	Stadium: Kristinebergs IP

28 June 2021 Friendly	(Sweden) Degerfors	2 - 2	(Sweden) Djurgården	Degerfors
15:00	Edvardsen 36'; Rajamohan 57'	Report	Chilufya 33'; Eriksson 59' (pen.)	Stadium: Stora Valla

=== Allsvenskan ===
==== League table ====
Pos	Team	Pld	W	D	L	GF	GA	GD	Pts	Qualification or relegation
1	Malmö FF (C)	30	17	8	5	58	30	+28	59	Qualification for the Champions League first qualifying round
2	AIK	30	18	5	7	45	25	+20	59	Qualification for the Europa Conference League second qualifying round (Note: The 2021–22 Svenska Cupen winners qualified for the Europa Conference League second qualifying round. Since the cup winners (Malmö FF) qualified based on league position, the cup winner spot was passed to the second-placed team, and the last Conference League second qualifying round spot was passed to the fourth-placed team.)
3	Djurgårdens IF	30	17	6	7	46	30	+16	57	Qualification for the Europa Conference League second qualifying round
4	IF Elfsborg	30	17	4	9	51	35	+16	55	Qualification for the Europa Conference League second qualifying round
5	Hammarby IF	30	15	8	7	54	41	+13	53	

Source: svenskfotboll.se (in Swedish)
Rules for classification: 1) Points; 2) Goal difference; 3) Goals scored; 4) Head-to-head points; 5) Head-to-head goal difference; 6) Head-to-head away goals scored; 7) Play-off
(Note: Play-off is only played if need to decide champion, teams for relegation or UEFA competition and will be played on a neutral ground).
(C) Champions

==== Results summary ====
Overall								Home						Away					
Pld	W	D	L	GF	GA	GD	Pts	W	D	L	GF	GA	GD	W	D	L	GF	GA	GD
30	17	6	7	46	30	+16	57	10	2	3	30	18	+12	7	4	4	16	12	+4

Last updated: 28 November 2021.
Source: soccerway

==== Results by round ====
Round	1	2	3	4	5	6	7	8	9	10	11	12	13	14	15	16	17	18	19	20	21	22	23	24	25	26	27	28	29	30
Ground	A	H	A	H	A	H	A	H	H	A	H	A	H	H	A	H	A	H	A	H	A	A	H	H	A	A	H	A	H	A
Result	W	W	W	W	L	W	D	D	W	D	W	W	W	L	W	D	L	W	D	W	W	L	L	W	L	W	W	D	L	W
Position	2	1	1	1	1	1	1	1	1	1	1	1	1	2	1	1	2	1	2	1	1	1	2	1	3	2	2	2	3	3

Updated to match(es) played on 4 December 2021. Source:
A = Away; H = Home; W = Win; D = Draw; L = Loss

==== April ====
11 April 2021 Match 1	Elfsborg	0 - 2	Djurgården	Borås
17:30 CEST	Holst (yellow card) 25'; Holmén (yellow card) 71'; Rømer (yellow card) 81'	Report	Witry 12' (yellow card) 86'; Chilufya 57'; Eriksson (yellow card) 85'	Stadium: Borås Arena; Attendance: 0 Referee: (Sweden) Adam Ladebäck

18 April 2021 Match 2	Djurgården	1 - 0	Norrköping	Stockholm
17:30 CEST	Radetinac 78'	Report	Castegren (yellow card) 82'	Stadium: Tele2 Arena; Attendance: 0 Referee: (Sweden) Mohammed Al-Hakim

25 April 2021 Match 3	Varberg	1 - 3	Djurgården	Varberg
15:00 CEST	Stanisic 43' (yellow card) 64'; Tranberg (yellow card) 45'	Report	Finndell 20'; Witry 30' (pen.) (yellow card) 61'; Une Larsson (yellow card) 55'; Bärkroth 81'	Stadium: Varberg Energi Arena; Attendance: 0 Referee: (Sweden) Fredrik Klitte

==== May ====
3 May 2021 Match 4	Djurgården	3 - 1	Malmö	Stockholm
18:30 CEST	Bärkroth 31' 70'; Schüller (yellow card) 61'; Witry 67'	Report	Nalić 77'; Berget (yellow card) 88'; Rakip (yellow card) 90+5'	Stadium: Tele2 Arena; Attendance: 0 Referee: (Sweden) Bojan Pandžić

9 May 2021 Match 5	Degerfors	2 - 0	Djurgården	Degerfors
15:00 CEST	Sabetkar (yellow card) 11'; Gravius (yellow card) 18'; Diawara (yellow card) 44'; Kralj (yellow card) 58'; Edvardsen 85' 90+2'	Report	Schüller (yellow card) 18'	Stadium: Stora Valla; Attendance: 0 Referee: (Sweden) Mohammed Al-Hakim

12 May 2021 Match 6	Djurgården	2 - 0	Östersunds FK	Stockholm
18:30 CEST	Chilufya 11'; Ekdal (yellow card) 51'; Löfgren 79'	Report	Haugan (yellow card) 87'	Stadium: Tele2 Arena; Attendance: 0 Referee: (Sweden) Victor Wolf

16 May 2021 Match 7	Hammarby	2 - 2	Djurgården	Stockholm
17:30 CEST	Andersen (yellow card) 28'; Bojanić (yellow card) 42'; Ludwigson 48'; Khalili (yellow card) 76'; Selmani 80'	Report	Une Larsson (yellow card) 9'; Holmberg 45+4' (yellow card) 86'; Finndell 57'	Stadium: Tele2 Arena; Attendance: 0 Referee: (Sweden) Kristoffer Karlsson

23 May 2021 Match 8	Djurgården	0 - 0	IFK Göteborg	Stockholm
17:30 CEST		Report	Bjärsmyr (yellow card) 37'; Wernbloom (yellow card) 73'	Stadium: Tele2 Arena; Attendance: 0 Referee: (Sweden) Glenn Nyberg

==== July ====
5 July 2021 Match 9	Djurgården	3 - 0	Örebro	Stockholm
18:00 CEST	Witry 15' (pen.); Eriksson 66'; Kujović (yellow card) 77'; Banda 88'	Report	Allain (yellow card) 14'; Skovgaard (yellow card) 44'; Mårtensson (yellow card) 54'	Stadium: Tele2 Arena; Attendance: 7,133; Referee: (Sweden) Granit Maqedonci

12 July 2021 Match 10	Halmstad	0 - 0	Djurgården	Halmstad
18:00 CEST	Lundevall (yellow card) 74'; Allansson (yellow card) 85'	Report		Stadium: Örjans Vall; Attendance: 1,322; Referee: (Sweden) Andreas Ekberg

19 July 2021 Match 11	Djurgården	5 - 1	Sirius	Stockholm
18:00 CEST	Une Larsson 21'; Finndell 26'; Eriksson 28'; Chilufya 40'; Banda 75'	Report	Ortmark (yellow card) 30'; Hellborg (yellow card) 33'; Sugita (yellow card) 37'; Roche (yellow card) 69'; Kouakou 72'; Saeid (yellow card) 80'	Stadium: Tele2 Arena; Attendance: 7,256; Referee: (Sweden) Fredrik Klitte

25 July 2021 Match 12	Kalmar	0 - 1	Djurgården	Kalmar
14:00 CEST	Sætra (yellow card) 59'; Sjöstedt (yellow card) 84'	Report	Witry 51'	Stadium: Guldfågeln Arena; Attendance: 4,163; Referee: (Sweden) Kaspar Sjöberg

==== August ====
1 August 2021 Match 13	Djurgården	2 - 1	Häcken	Stockholm
14:00 CEST	Carlsson 48' (o.g.); Finndell (yellow card) 60'; Une Larsson 64'	Report	Witry 57' (o.g.); Hammar (yellow card) 71'; Jeremejeff (yellow card) 79'; Irandust (yellow card) 89'	Stadium: Tele2 Arena; Attendance: 8,681; Referee: (Sweden) Glenn Nyberg

8 August 2021 Match 14	Djurgården	1 - 4	AIK	Stockholm
14:00 CEST	Radetinac 29'; Löfgren (yellow card) 89'; Une Larsson (yellow card) 90+1'	Report	Goitom 8'; Larsson 50'; Otieno (yellow card) 65'; Stefanelli 69'; Milošević 80'	Stadium: Tele2 Arena; Attendance: 8,712; Referee: (Sweden) Mohammed Al-Hakim

15 August 2021 Match 15	Mjällby	0 - 1	Djurgården	Hällevik
14:00 CEST	Gustavsson (yellow card) 90+5'	Report	Schüller (yellow card) 38'; Bärkroth 45'	Stadium: Strandvallen; Attendance: 1,478; Referee: (Sweden) Adam Ladeback

23 August 2021 Match 16	Djurgården	0 - 0	Mjällby	Stockholm
18:00 CEST	Radetinac (yellow card) 19'	Report	Gustavsson (yellow card) 27'; Kričak (yellow card) 60'; Löfquist (yellow card) 85'	Stadium: Tele2 Arena; Attendance: 8,536; Referee: (Sweden) Victor Wolf

29 August 2021 Match 17	Sirius	1 - 0	Djurgården	Uppsala
14:00 CEST	Ortmark (yellow card) 27'; Widgren (yellow card) 43'; Zeidan 71'	Report	Schüller (yellow card) 39'; Finndell (yellow card) 41'; Käck (yellow card) 82'; Banda (yellow card) 82'	Stadium: Studenternas IP; Attendance: 3,135; Referee: (Sweden) Kaspar Sjöberg

==== September ====
12 September 2021 Match 18	Djurgården	4 - 1	Hammarby	Stockholm
14:00 CEST	Eriksson (penalty missed) 30' 30'; Ekdal 39'; Asoro 41'; Chilufya 74'; Käck (yellow card) 83'	Report	Ludwigson 19'; Fenger (yellow card) 35'; Outtara (yellow card) 48'	Stadium: Tele2 Arena; Attendance: 9,120; Referee: (Sweden) Andreas Ekberg

19 September 2021 Match 19	Malmö	1 - 1	Djurgården	Malmö
16:30 CEST	Čolak 16' (pen.) (yellow card) 46'; Christiansen (yellow card) 21'	Report	Ekdal 80'; Zetterström (yellow card) 88'	Stadium: Eleda Stadion; Attendance: 5,532; Referee: (Sweden) Mohammed Al-Hakim

22 September 2021 Match 20	Djurgården	3 - 2	Degerfors	Stockholm
18:00 CEST	Ekdal 13'; Schüller (yellow card) 35'; Eriksson 38'; Radetinac 74'	Report	Lindahl (yellow card) 29'; Đurđić 53' 71'; Carlén (yellow card) 82' (yellow-red card) 90+1'	Stadium: Tele2 Arena; Attendance: 9,050; Referee: (Sweden) Granite Maqedonci

26 September 2021 Match 21	Östersunds FK	0 - 3	Djurgården	Östersund
14:00 CEST	Haugan (yellow card) 74'	Report	Une Larsson 13'; Chilufya 32'; Holmberg 40'	Stadium: Jämtkraft Arena; Attendance: 2,478; Referee: (Sweden) Kaspar Sjöberg

==== October ====
3 October 2021 Match 22	AIK	1 - 0	Djurgården	Stockholm
14:00 CEST	Stefanelli 45+2' (yellow card) 28' (yellow-red card) 45+2'; Larsson (yellow card) 61'; Nordfeldt (yellow card) 77'	Report	Schüller (red card) 11'; Holmberg (yellow card) 17'; Asoro (yellow card) 41'	Stadium: Friends Arena; Attendance: 42,539; Referee: (Sweden) Glenn Nyberg

18 October 2021 Match 23	Djurgården	0 - 3	Elfsborg	Stockholm
18:00 CEST	Eriksson (yellow card) 26'; Käck (yellow card) 45+1'; Ekdal (yellow card) 63'	Report	Strand (yellow card) 3'; Olsson 20'; Rømer (yellow card) 37'; Frick (yellow card) 45+1'; Alm 50' 77'; Holmén (yellow card) 90+1'	Stadium: Tele2 Arena; Attendance: 19,443; Referee: (Sweden) Mohammed Al-Hakim

23 October 2021 Match 24	Djurgården	3 - 2	Kalmar	Stockholm
14:00 CEST	Chilufya 14'; Ekdal 23'; Banda 35' (yellow card) 90+5'; Finndell (yellow card) 82'	Report	S. Ring (yellow card) 40'; J. Ring 49'; Jansson 60'	Stadium: Tele2 Arena; Attendance: 18,930; Referee: (Sweden) Bojan Pandžić

28 October 2021 Match 25	IFK Göteborg	3 - 0	Djurgården	Gothenburg
18:00 CEST	Erlingmark 20'; Berg 50'; Sana 52'	Report	Schüller (yellow card) 43'	Stadium: Gamla Ullevi; Attendance: 12,251; Referee: (Sweden) Kaspar Sjöberg

31 October 2021 Match 26	Örebro	0 - 1	Djurgården	Örebro
16:30 CEST	Bergmark (yellow card) 20'; Mårtensson (yellow card) 23'	Report	Ekdal (yellow card) 15'; Banda 45+1'; Une Larsson (yellow card) 48'; Chilufya (yellow card) 59'	Stadium: Behrn Arena; Attendance: 5,598; Referee: (Sweden) Fredrik Klitte

==== November ====
6 November 2021 Match 27	Djurgården	1 - 0	Halmstad	Stockholm
14:00 CEST	Chilufya 74'; Finndell (yellow card) 89'	Report		Stadium: Tele2 Arena; Attendance: 17,876; Referee: (Sweden) Glenn Nyberg

21 November 2021 Match 28	Norrköping	1 - 1	Djurgården	Norrköping
16:00 CEST	Adegbenro 45'	Report	Holmberg 19'; Ademi (yellow card) 90+4'	Stadium: PlatinumCars Arena; Attendance: 9,758; Referee: (Sweden) Mohammed Al-Hakim

28 November 2021 Match 29	Djurgården	2 - 3	Varberg	Stockholm
16:00 CEST	Eriksson (penalty missed) 45+3; Chilufya 48'; Finndell (yellow card) 50'; Schüller (yellow card) 81'; Asoro 90+3'	Report	Johansson 33'; Karlsson (yellow card) 36'; Moon (yellow card) 50' (goal) 55'; Winbo 61'	Stadium: Tele2 Arena; Attendance: 23,227; Referee: (Sweden) Fredrik Klitte

==== December ====
5 December 2021 Match 30	Häcken	0 - 1	Djurgården	Gothenburg
16:00 CEST	Hammar (yellow card) 44' (yellow-red card) 90+2'; Carlsson (yellow card) 61'; Bengtsson (yellow card) 85'	Report	Eriksson 12'; Holmberg (yellow card) 35'; Une Larsson (yellow card) 70'	Stadium: Bravida Arena; Attendance: 2,738; Referee: (Sweden) Andreas Ekberg

=== 2020–21 Svenska Cupen ===
==== Group stage ====
Pos	Team	Pld	W	D	L	GF	GA	GD	Pts	Qualification
1	Djurgårdens IF	3	3	0	0	12	1	+11	9	Advance to Knockout stage
2	IK Brage	3	1	0	2	1	2	−1	3	
3	Kalmar FF	3	1	0	2	3	6	−3	3	
4	Umeå FC	3	1	0	2	2	9	−7	3	

Updated to match(es) played on 6 March 2021. Source: Swedish Football Association
Rules for classification: 1) Points; 2) Goal difference; 3) Goals scored; 4) Head-to-head record; 5) Highest ranked team

21 February 2021 Match 1	Djurgården	1 - 0	Brage	Stockholm
17:00	Witry 22'	Report	Williams (yellow card) 20'; Liljestrand (yellow card) 86'	Stadium: Tele2 Arena; Attendance: 0 Referee: (Sweden) Adam Ladebäck

28 February 2021 Match 2	Djurgården	7 - 0	Umeå	Stockholm
17:00	Witry 25'; Edwards 28'; Une Larsson 31' (yellow card) 46'; Finndell (yellow card) 41'; Chilufya 55' 59' 90'; Kujović 81'	Report	Yeboah (yellow card) 62'	Stadium: Tele2 Arena; Attendance: 0 Referee: (Sweden) Tess Olofsson

6 March 2021 Match 3	Djurgården	4 - 1	Kalmar	Stockholm
17:00	Chilufya 1' 19'; Holmberg 10' 64'; Ekdal (yellow card) 33'; Cornic (yellow card) 41'	Report	J. Ring (yellow card) 40'; Gustavsson 42'; Johansson (yellow card) 54'	Stadium: Tele2 Arena; Attendance: 0 Referee: (Sweden) Joakim Östling

==== Quarter-finals ====
14 March 2021 Quarter-finals	Djurgården	3 - 0	Östersunds FK	Stockholm
13:00	Holmberg 15'; Chilufya 52'; Bärkroth 70'	Report	Mensiro (yellow card) 41'; Ouattara (yellow card) 44'; Arhin (yellow card) 59'	Stadium: Tele2 Arena; Attendance: 0 Referee: (Sweden) Glenn Nyberg

==== Semi-finals ====
4 April 2021 Semi-finals	Djurgården	0 - 1	Hammarby	Stockholm
13:00	Une Larsson (yellow card) 22'; Finndell (yellow card) 42'; Eriksson (yellow card) 90+4'	Report	Ouattara 17'; Fenger (yellow card) 25'; Andersen (yellow card) 57'	Stadium: Tele2 Arena; Attendance: 0 Referee: (Sweden) Fredrik Klitte

=== 2021–22 Svenska Cupen ===
==== Qualification ====
18 August 2021 Round 2	Karlslunds IF	0 - 4	Djurgården	Örebro
17:30	Ibrahimbegovic (yellow card) 64'	Report	Ademi 17' 58'; Ekdal 22' 39'	Stadium: Karlslund Arena; Attendance: 600; Referee: (Sweden) Jovan Krsmanovic

== Statistics ==
=== Appearances ===
Last updated: 4 December 2021.

No.	Pos.	Name	Allsvenskan		Svenska Cupen 2020/21		Svenska Cupen 2021/22		Total	
No.	Pos.	Name	Apps	Goals	Apps	Goals	Apps	Goals	Apps	Goals
Goalkeepers
15	GK	(Russia) Aleksandr Vasyutin	10	0	4	0	0	0	14	0
30	GK	(Sweden) Tommi Vaiho	1+1	0	1	0	1	0	3+1	0
35	GK	(Sweden) Jacob Widell Zetterström	19	0	0	0	0	0	19	0
Defenders
2	DF	(Philippines) Jesper Nyholm	4+6	0	0	0	1	0	5+6	0
3	DF	(Sweden) Hjalmar Ekdal	25+1	4	5	0	1	2	31+1	6
4	DF	(Sweden) Jacob Une Larsson	28	3	3	1	0	0	31	4
5	DF	(Sweden) Elliot Käck	28	0	4	0	0	0	32	0
16	DF	(Sweden) Jesper Löfgren	11+13	1	0+1	0	1	0	12+14	1
18	DF	(Sweden) Isak Hien	0+5	0	0	0	0+1	0	0+6	0
22	DF	(Norway) Leo Cornic	1+6	0	2	0	1	0	4+6	0
26	DF	(Sweden) Linus Tagesson	0	0	0+1	0	0	0	0+1	0
27	DF	(Sweden) Melker Jonsson	0	0	1+1	0	0+1	0	1+2	0
Midfielders
6	MF	(Finland) Rasmus Schüller	26	0	3	0	0	0	29	0
7	MF	(Sweden) Magnus Eriksson	30	5	4	0	1	0	35	5
8	MF	(Sweden) Elias Andersson	0+2	0	1+1	0	0	0	1+3	0
9	MF	(Bosnia and Herzegovina) Haris Radetinac	20+9	3	1+1	0	1	0	22+10	3
11	MF	(Albania) Albion Ademi	0+8	0	3+2	0	1	2	4+10	2
12	MF	(Zambia) Emmanuel Banda	5+17	4	0+1	0	1	0	6+18	4
13	MF	(Sweden) Hampus Finndell	26	3	5	0	0	0	31	3
14	MF	(Zambia) Edward Chilufya	29	8	5	6	0	0	34	14
19	MF	(Sweden) Nicklas Bärkroth	17+11	4	1+4	1	0	0	18+15	5
24	MF	(England) Curtis Edwards	4+3	0	3+2	1	1	0	8+5	1
25	MF	(Sweden) Mattias Mitku	0	0	0+1	0	0	0	0+1	0
28	MF	(Sweden) Kofi Asare	0	0	0	0	0+1	0	0+1	0
Forwards
10	FW	(Sweden) Joel Asoro	11+15	2	0+2	0	0+1	0	11+18	2
17	FW	(Sweden) Kalle Holmberg	21+3	3	5	3	0+1	0	26+4	6
20	FW	(Sweden) Emir Kujović	0+11	0	0+3	1	1	0	1+14	1
Players transferred out during the season
23	DF	(Norway) Aslak Fonn Witry	14	5	4	2	0	0	18	7

=== Goalscorers ===
The list is sorted by shirt number when total goals are equal.

Rnk	Pos	No.	Player	Allsvenskan	Svenska Cupen 2020/21	Svenska Cupen 2021/22	Total
1	MF	14	(Zambia) Edward Chilufya	8	6	0	14
2	DF	23	(Norway) Aslak Fonn Witry	5	2	0	7
3	DF	3	(Sweden) Hjalmar Ekdal	4	0	2	6
3	FW	17	(Sweden) Kalle Holmberg	3	3	0	6
5	MF	7	(Sweden) Magnus Eriksson	5	0	0	5
5	MF	19	(Sweden) Nicklas Bärkroth	4	1	0	5
7	DF	4	(Sweden) Jacob Une Larsson	3	1	0	4
7	MF	12	(Zambia) Emmanuel Banda	4	0	0	4
9	MF	9	(Bosnia and Herzegovina) Haris Radetinac	3	0	0	3
9	MF	13	(Sweden) Hampus Finndell	3	0	0	3
11	FW	10	(Sweden) Joel Asoro	2	0	0	2
11	MF	11	(Albania) Albion Ademi	0	0	2	2
13	DF	16	(Sweden) Jesper Löfgren	1	0	0	1
13	FW	20	(Sweden) Emir Kujović	0	1	0	1
13	MF	24	(England) Curtis Edwards	0	1	0	1
TOTALS				45	15	4	64

==== Hat-tricks ====
Player	Against	Competition	Minutes	Score after goals	Result	Date
(Zambia) Edward Chilufya	(Sweden) Umeå	Svenska Cupen	55', 59', 90'	4–0, 5–0, 7–0	7–0 (H)	28 February 2021

==== Own goals ====
Player	Against	Competition	Minute	Score after own goal	Result	Date
(Norway) Aslak Fonn Witry	(Sweden) Häcken	Allsvenskan	57'	1–1	2–1 (H)	1 August 2021

=== Disciplinary ===
Updated 17 January 2022
The list is sorted by shirt number when total cards are equal.

Rnk	Pos	No.	Name	Allsvenskan		Svenska Cupen		Total	
Rnk	Pos	No.	Name	Yellow card	Red card	Yellow card	Red card	Yellow card	Red card
1	MF	6	(Finland) Rasmus Schüller	7	1	0	0	7	1
2	DF	4	(Sweden) Jacob Une Larsson	5	0	2	0	7	0
2	MF	13	(Sweden) Hampus Finndell	5	0	2	0	7	0
4	DF	3	(Sweden) Hjalmar Ekdal	3	0	1	0	4	0
5	DF	5	(Sweden) Elliot Käck	3	0	0	0	3	0
5	MF	7	(Sweden) Magnus Eriksson	2	0	1	0	3	0
5	FW	17	(Sweden) Kalle Holmberg	3	0	0	0	3	0
8	MF	12	(Zambia) Emmanuel Banda	2	0	0	0	2	0
8	DF	23	(Norway) Aslak Fonn Witry	2	0	0	0	2	0
10	MF	9	(Bosnia and Herzegovina) Haris Radetinac	1	0	0	0	1	0
10	FW	10	(Sweden) Joel Asoro	1	0	0	0	1	0
10	MF	11	(Albania) Albion Ademi	1	0	0	0	1	0
10	MF	14	(Zambia) Edward Chilufya	1	0	0	0	1	0
10	DF	16	(Sweden) Jesper Löfgren	1	0	0	0	1	0
10	FW	20	(Sweden) Emir Kujović	1	0	0	0	1	0
10	DF	22	(Norway) Leo Cornic	0	0	1	0	1	0
10	GK	35	(Sweden) Jacob Widell Zetterström	1	0	0	0	1	0
Total				39	1	7	0	46	1

=== Clean sheets ===
The list is sorted by shirt number when total clean sheets are equal.

Rnk	No.	Player	Allsvenskan	Svenska Cupen 2020/21	Svenska Cupen 2021/22	Total
1	15	(Russia) Aleksandr Vasyutin	6	2	0	8
2	35	(Sweden) Jacob Widell Zetterström	7	0	0	7
3	30	(Sweden) Tommi Vaiho	1	1	1	3
TOTALS			14	3	1	18
