= Allan Mohideen =

Iraqi professional footballer (born 1993)

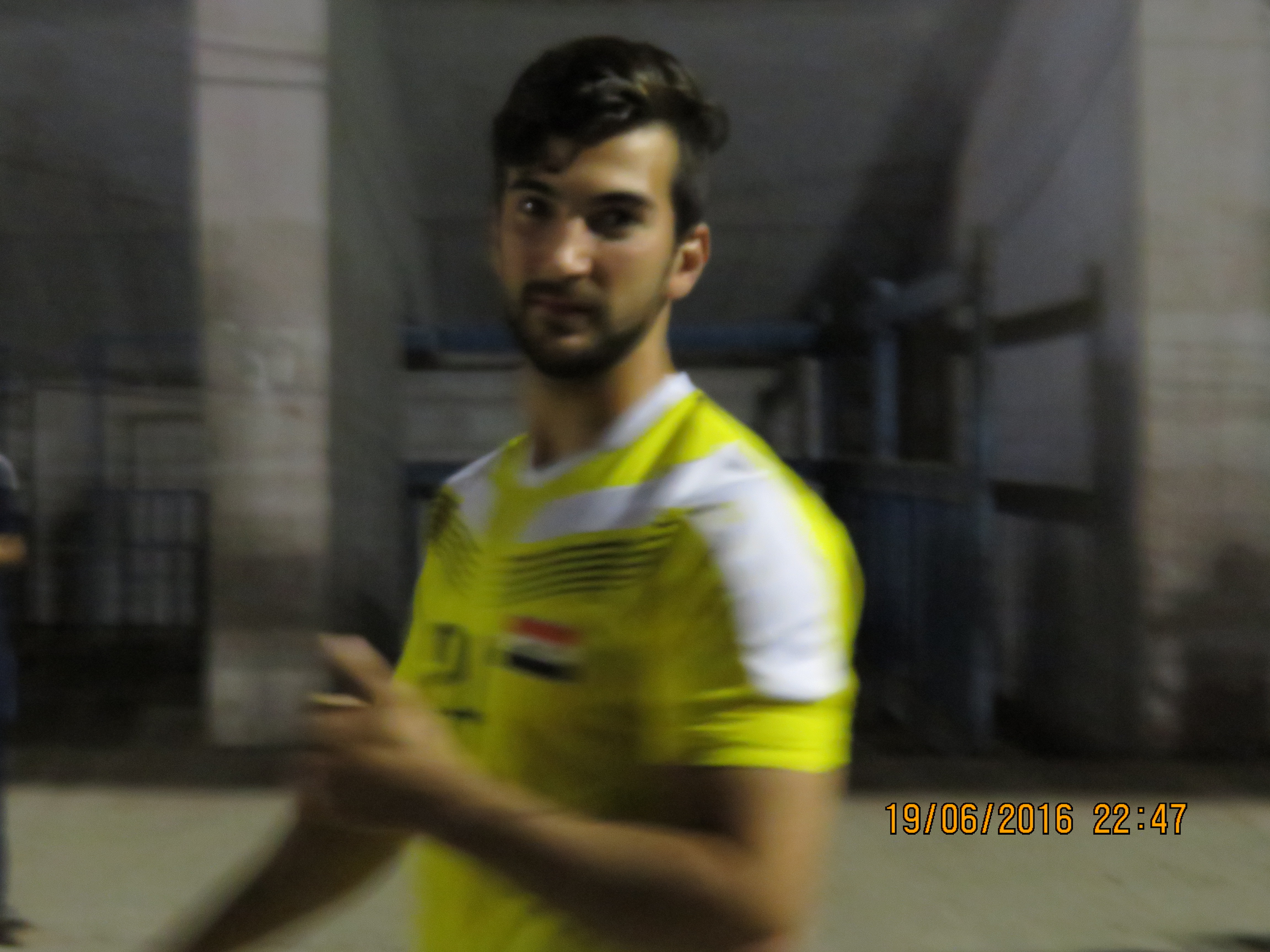

Personal information
- Date of birth: 11 November 1993 (age 33)
- Place of birth: Gothenburg, Sweden
- Height: 1.78 m (5 ft 10 in)
- Position: Right back

Team information
- Current team: Utsiktens BK
- Number: 2

Youth career
- Kållered SK
- –2012: IFK Göteborg

Senior career*
Years	Team	Apps	(Gls)
2013–2014	Qviding FIF	46	(0)
2015–2016	Ljungskile SK	50	(1)
2017	Utsiktens BK	16	(0)
2018	GAIS	3	(0)
2018	Örgryte IS	4	(0)
2019	Balltorps FF	3	(2)
2020–2024	Utsiktens BK	112	(13)
2025	Al-Karma SC	15	(0)
2025–	Utsiktens BK	7	(1)

International career
2016–	Iraq	3	(0)
- * Club domestic league appearances and goals as of 14 November 2025

Allan Mohideen (born 11 November 1993) is a professional footballer who plays as a right back for Utsiktens BK. Born in Sweden, he has represented the Iraq national team.

== Club career ==
=== Örgryte IS ===
Mohideen signed with Örgryte IS in August 2018, and left the club again on 19 November 2018. Later he stated that Örgryte wanted to keep him, but that it didn't feel like the right step for him. He then moved to Marbella in Spain, where he began a civil career as a broker, but also as an advisor and a consultant where he help people, many Swedes among other things, invest money in housing projects. In 2019 he briefly played for Balltorps FF in the Division 5, the seventh tier of Swedish football.

== International career ==
Mohideen was raised in Sweden to an Iraqi-Kurdish father and a Romanian mother. He debuted for the Iraq national football team in a friendly 2–1 loss against Qatar.

== Career statistics ==
=== International ===
As of match played 24 January 2024

Appearances and goals by national team and year
National team	Year	Apps	Goals
Iraq	2016	1	0
Iraq	2023	1	0
Iraq	2024	1	0
Total		3	0

== See also ==
- List of Iraq international footballers
