= Samir Maarouf =

Association football player

Personal information
- Date of birth: 2 January 2001 (age 25)
- Place of birth: Västra Frölunda, Sweden
- Height: 1.69 m (5 ft 7 in)
- Position: Winger

Team information
- Current team: Lunds BK
- Number: 13

Youth career
- Balltorps FF
- 2015–2017: GAIS
- 2017–2021: BK Häcken

Senior career*
Years	Team	Apps	(Gls)
2021–2022	BK Häcken	7	(0)
2021	→ Vasalunds IF (loan)	4	(0)
2022–2023	AFC Eskilstuna	34	(1)
2024–	Lunds BK	19	(5)

International career^{‡}
2023–	Palestine	1	(0)
- * Club domestic league appearances and goals as of 1 January 2025 ‡ National team caps and goals as of 18:49, 1 April 2023 (UTC)

Samir Maarouf (Arabic: سمير معروف; born 2 January 2001) is a professional footballer who plays as a winger for Swedish Ettan club Lunds BK. Born in Sweden, he represents the Palestine national team.

== Career ==
Maarouf is a youth product of Balltorps FF and GAIS, before moving to BK Häcken's academy in 2017. On 18 November 2020, he was promoted to BK Häcken's senior team signing a 1-year contract. He made his senior and professional debut with BK Häcken in a 2–0 Svenska Cupen win over Dalkurd FF on 21 February 2021. After playing a couple of games in the Allsvenskan in early 2021, he moved to the Superettan club Vasalunds IF on loan for the rest of the season. Returning to Häcken, he extended his contract for one more year on 3 January 2022.

On 22 June 2022, Maarouf transferred to AFC Eskilstuna, signing a 3.5 year contract.

== International career ==
Born in Sweden, Maarouf is of Palestinian descent. He debuted with the Palestine national team in a friendly 2–1 win over Bahrain on 25 March 2023.
