= Robert Bengtsson-Bärkroth =

Swedish footballer

Personal information
- Date of birth: 4 June 1968 (age 58)
- Place of birth: Gothenburg
- Position: Defender

Senior career*
Years	Team	Apps	(Gls)
1987–2000	Västra Frölunda IF		
1999–2000	→ Barnsley F.C. (loan)	0	(0)
2001–2003	Örgryte IS		
- * Club domestic league appearances and goals

Robert Bengtsson-Bärkroth (born 4 June 1968) is a Swedish former football midfielder.

He played 239 matches in Allsvenskan. During his loan to Barnsley he featured once in the FA Cup and once in the League Cup, but not in the league. He is the father of Nicklas Bärkroth.
