= Jacob Widell Zetterström =

Swedish footballer (born 1998)

- Widell Zetterström with Sweden in 2026

Personal information
- Full name: Jacob Mikael Widell Zetterström
- Date of birth: 11 July 1998 (age 28)
- Place of birth: Stockholm, Sweden
- Height: 1.97 m (6 ft 6 in)
- Position: Goalkeeper

Team information
- Current team: Derby County
- Number: 1

Youth career
- 2006–2014: Djurgårdens IF
- 2014–2015: IFK Lidingö

Senior career*
Years	Team	Apps	(Gls)
2015–2018	IFK Lidingö	37	(0)
2019–2024	Djurgårdens IF	87	(0)
2019	→ IFK Lidingö (loan)	7	(0)
2024–	Derby County	83	(0)

International career^{‡}
2023–	Sweden	5	(0)
- * Club domestic league appearances and goals as of 22:09, 6 November 2026 (UTC) ‡ National team caps and goals as of 15:55, 1 July 2026 (UTC)

Jacob Mikael Widell Zetterström (born 11 July 1998) is a Swedish professional footballer who plays as a goalkeeper for EFL Championship club Derby County and the Sweden national team.

== Club career ==
=== Early career ===
Widell Zetterström started his senior career in IFK Lidingö, joining Djurgårdens IF in 2019 and going on loan back to Lidingö the first season. Without having a place in the squad in 2020 due to a head injury, he made his Djurgården debut in 2021. He would play 118 times for Djurgården.

=== Derby County ===
On 16 August 2024, Widell Zetterström signed with English Championship club Derby County, on a three-year-contract after an undisclosed fee was agreed between Derby and Djurgården. Widell Zetterström made his Derby County debut in a 2–1 defeat to Watford on 24 August 2024. Widell Zetterström established himself as Derby's first choice goalkeeper beating off competition from Josh Vickers. Widell Zetterström's season came to a premature end in April 2025 with four games of the season remaining, after a facial injury picked up against Portsmouth, during the 2024–25 season he played 42 times for Derby, 40 times in the league with nine clean sheets as Derby finished 19th in the Championship.

Widell Zetterström returned from injury ahead of the 2025–26 season and kept his place as first-choice goalkeeper. He was nominated for the EFL Championship Player of the Month for October 2025. Amid transfer speculation about a potential move to a Premier League club, it was reported in January 2026 that Widell Zetterström was in talks over a potential contact extension at Derby. In January 2026, Widell Zetterström was forced out of the Derby team with an viral infection. He was ruled out of action for February and March with Derby head coach John Eustace calling the mystery illness a "worrying" time for the player who suffered multiple concussions when playing in Sweden, he was sent for tests to investigate the issue. Widell Zetterström returned to action 18 April 2026 in a match against Oxford United, after a three-month absence from the team. His save from Scott Twine's free-kick on 22 August 2025 against Bristol City was awarded Save of the Season at Derby County's end-of-season awards. Widell Zetterström made 33 appearances for Derby County during his second season at the club, keeping seven clean sheets.

== International career ==
Widell Zetterström made his full international debut for Sweden on 12 January 2023, playing for 45 minutes before being replaced by Oliver Dovin in a friendly 2–1 win against Iceland.

Widell Zetterström was named in Sweden's 2026 FIFA World Cup squad. Widell Zetterström was second choice behind Kristoffer Nordfeldt in Sweden's opening two fixtures of the World Cup but after a poor performance from Nordfeldt his second game, Widell Zetterström played in Sweden's final 1–1 drawn Group F game against Japan, as well as Sweden's last 32 game 3–0 defeat against France, he received praise for his performance in both these matches.

== Personal life ==
Widell Zetterström's maternal grandfather was the pediatrician Rolf Zetterström, while his grandmother was Jelena Rennerová, who had fled Communist-era Czechoslovakia with the help of Olof Palme, the former Swedish prime minister.

== Career statistics ==
=== Club ===
As of match played 6 November 2026

Club	Season	League			National cup (Note: Includes Svenska Cupen, FA Cup)		League cup (Note: Includes EFL Cup)		Europe		Other		Total	
Club	Season	Division	Apps	Goals	Apps	Goals	Apps	Goals	Apps	Goals	Apps	Goals	Apps	Goals
IFK Lidingö	2015	Division 4 Mellersta	3	0	0	0	—		—		—		3	0
IFK Lidingö	2016	Division 3 Östra Svealand	5	0	0	0	—		—		—		5	0
IFK Lidingö	2017	Division 2 Norra Svealand	4	0	0	0	—		—		—		4	0
IFK Lidingö	2018	Division 2 Norra Svealand	25	0	1	0	—		—		—		26	0
IFK Lidingö	Total		37	0	1	0	0	0	0	0	0	0	38	0
Djurgårdens IF	2019	Allsvenskan	0	0	0	0	—		—		—		0	0
Djurgårdens IF	2021	Allsvenskan	19	0	0	0	—		—		—		19	0
Djurgårdens IF	2022	Allsvenskan	28	0	4	0	—		11 (Note: Appearances in UEFA Europa Conference League)	0	—		43	0
Djurgårdens IF	2023	Allsvenskan	23	0	5	0	—		2	0	—		30	0
Djurgårdens IF	2024	Allsvenskan	17	0	5	0	—		4	0	—		26	0
Djurgårdens IF	Total		87	0	14	0	0	0	17	0	0	0	118	0
IFK Lidingö (loan)	2019	Division 2 Norra Svealand	7	0	0	0	—		—		—		7	0
Derby County	2024–25	Championship	40	0	1	0	1	0	—		—		42	0
Derby County	2025–26	Championship	32	0	1	0	0	0	—		—		33	0
Derby County	2026–27	Championship	11	0	0	0	1	0	—		—		12	0
Derby County	Total		83	0	2	0	2	0	0	0	0	0	87	0
Career total			214	0	17	0	2	0	17	0	0	0	250	0

=== International ===
As of match played 30 June 2026

Appearances and goals by national team and year
National team	Year	Apps	Goals
Sweden	2023	1	0
Sweden	2024	0	0
Sweden	2025	1	0
Sweden	2026	3	0
Total		5	0

== Honours ==
Djurgårdens IF

- Allsvenskan: 2019
