= Isak Hien =

Swedish footballer (born 1999)

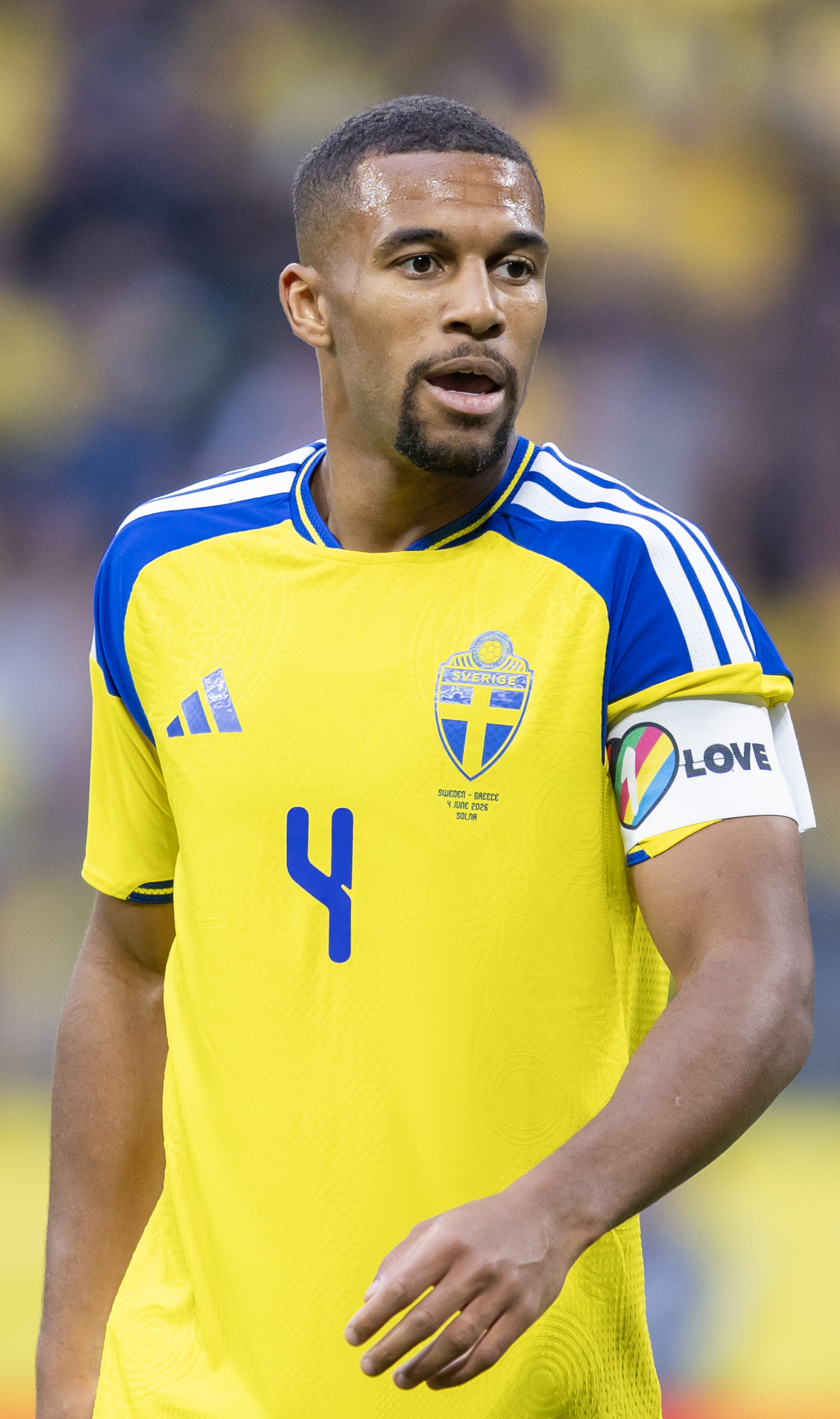
- Hien with Sweden in 2026

Personal information
- Full name: Isak Malcolm Kwaku Hien
- Date of birth: 13 January 1999 (age 27)
- Place of birth: Stockholm, Sweden
- Height: 1.91 m (6 ft 3 in)
- Position: Centre-back

Team information
- Current team: Atalanta
- Number: 4

Youth career
- –2010: Kista SC
- 2010–2014: AIK
- 2015: FC Djursholm
- 2016–2017: Vasalund IF

Senior career*
Years	Team	Apps	(Gls)
2017–2020	Vasalund IF	80	(4)
2021–2022	Djurgården	22	(2)
2021	→ Vasalund IF (loan)	12	(0)
2022–2024	Hellas Verona	43	(0)
2024–	Atalanta	74	(1)

International career^{‡}
2022–	Sweden	32	(0)
- * Club domestic league appearances and goals as of 23:11, 22 May 2026 (UTC) ‡ National team caps and goals as of 07:55, 26 June 2026 (UTC)

Isak Malcolm Kwaku Hien (born 13 January 1999) is a Swedish professional footballer who plays as a centre-back for Serie A club Atalanta and the Sweden national team.

== Club career ==
=== Early career ===
Born in Stockholm, Hien played youth football for AIK, where he played alongside future professional players Alexander Isak and Leopold Wahlstedt. In 2016, he signed with Vasalund IF with which he made his senior debut in Division 1 Norra in 2017. Up until the age of 21, he operated mainly as a striker, but was convinced to switch to centre-back, and flourished in that new position.

=== Djurgårdens IF ===
In 2021, he signed with Djurgårdens IF before going back to Vasalund on loan during the 2021 Superettan season. During the 2022 season, Hien played in 17 games and scored two goals in Allsvenskan before he was signed by Serie A side Hellas Verona.

=== Hellas Verona ===
On 27 August 2022, Hien joined Italian club Hellas Verona on a permanent deal, signing a four-year contract. He made his Serie A debut for Verona against Atalanta on 28 August.

He went on to make 43 appearances in Serie A during his season and a half at the Veneto club.

=== Atalanta ===
On 2 January 2024, Hien joined fellow Serie A side Atalanta, signing a contract until June 2028. The transfer commanded a reported fee of €9 million.

After making his debut as a substitute in a 1–1 draw against Roma on 7 January, Hien established himself in the Atalanta team that won the 2023–24 UEFA Europa League and finished runner-up to Juventus in the Coppa Italia.

On 21 December 2025, Hien scored his first Serie A goal in a 1–0 win over Genoa.

== International career ==
On 14 September 2022, Hien was selected for the Sweden national team for the first time ahead of their 2022–23 UEFA Nations League B games against Serbia and Slovenia. On 24 September 2022, he made his full international debut in a 4–1 loss against Serbia in the 2022–23 UEFA Nations League B, playing the full 90 minutes at centre-back alongside national team captain Victor Lindelöf.

On 12 May 2026, Hien was named in the Sweden squad for the 2026 FIFA World Cup.

== Personal life ==
Hien was born in Sweden to a Swedish mother and a Ghanaian father of Burkinabé descent. His brother Leon Hien is also a professional footballer.

== Career statistics ==
=== Club ===
As of match played 22 May 2026

Appearances and goals by club, season and competition
Club	Season	League			National cup (Note: Includes Svenska Cupen, Coppa Italia)		Europe		Other		Total	
Club	Season	Division	Apps	Goals	Apps	Goals	Apps	Goals	Apps	Goals	Apps	Goals
Vasalund IF	2017	Division 1 Norra	17	0	3	0	—		—		20	0
Vasalund IF	2018	Division 2 Norra Svealand	15	1	1	0	—		—		16	1
Vasalund IF	2019	Division 1 Norra	22	2	2	0	—		—		24	2
Vasalund IF	2020	Ettan Norra	26	1	1	0	—		—		27	1
Vasalund IF	Total		80	4	7	0	—		—		87	4
Djurgårdens IF	2021	Allsvenskan	5	0	1	0	—		—		6	0
Djurgårdens IF	2022	Allsvenskan	17	2	4	0	6 (Note: Appearances in UEFA Europa Conference League)	1	—		27	3
Djurgårdens IF	Total		22	2	5	0	6	1	—		33	3
Vasalund IF (loan)	2021	Superettan	12	0	—		—		—		12	0
Hellas Verona	2022–23	Serie A	32	0	0	0	—		1 (Note: Appearance in Serie A relegation tie-breaker)	0	32	0
Hellas Verona	2023–24	Serie A	10	0	1	0	—		—		11	0
Hellas Verona	Total		42	0	1	0	—		1	0	44	0
Atalanta	2023–24	Serie A	16	0	4	0	6 (Note: Appearances in UEFA Europa League)	0	—		26	0
Atalanta	2024–25	Serie A	30	0	2	0	8 (Note: Appearances in UEFA Champions League)	0	2 (Note: One appearance in UEFA Super Cup, one appearance in Supercoppa Italiana)	0	42	0
Atalanta	2025–26	Serie A	28	1	2	0	9	0	—		39	1
Atalanta	Total		74	1	8	0	23	0	2	0	107	1
Career total			230	7	21	0	29	1	3	0	283	8

=== International ===
As of match played 25 June 2026

Appearances and goals by national team and year
National team	Year	Apps	Goals
Sweden	2022	4	0
Sweden	2023	4	0
Sweden	2024	9	0
Sweden	2025	9	0
Sweden	2026	6	0
Total		32	0

== Honours ==
Atalanta

- UEFA Europa League: 2023–24

Individual

- Swedish Defender of the Year: 2024
