= Nicklas Bärkroth =

Swedish footballer (born 1992)

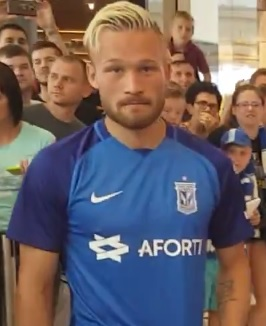
- Bärkroth with Lech Poznań in 2017

Personal information
- Full name: Nicklas Robert Bärkroth
- Date of birth: 19 January 1992 (age 34)
- Place of birth: Gothenburg, Sweden
- Height: 1.74 m (5 ft 9 in)
- Position: Winger

Youth career
- 1998–2006: Balltorps FF
- 2006–2007: IFK Göteborg

Senior career*
Years	Team	Apps	(Gls)
2007–2012	IFK Göteborg	54	(4)
2011	→ IF Brommapojkarna (loan)	11	(6)
2012	→ União Leiria (loan)	10	(0)
2013–2014	IF Brommapojkarna	51	(3)
2015–2017	IFK Norrköping	53	(6)
2017–2018	Lech Poznań	19	(0)
2018	Lech Poznań II	1	(0)
2018–2021	Djurgårdens IF	76	(8)
2022–2025	Örgryte IS	74	(10)
Total		349	(37)

International career
2007–2009	Sweden U17	12	(4)
2009–2011	Sweden U19	13	(2)
2012–2015	Sweden U21	11	(1)
2015–2017	Sweden	6	(0)
- * Club domestic league appearances and goals

Nicklas Robert Bärkroth (born 19 January 1992) is a Swedish former professional footballer who played as a winger. He played for Balltorps FF, IFK Göteborg, União Leiria, IF Brommapojkarna, IFK Norrköping, Lech Poznań, Djurgårdens IF, and Örgryte IS. He won six caps for the Sweden national team.

== Club career ==
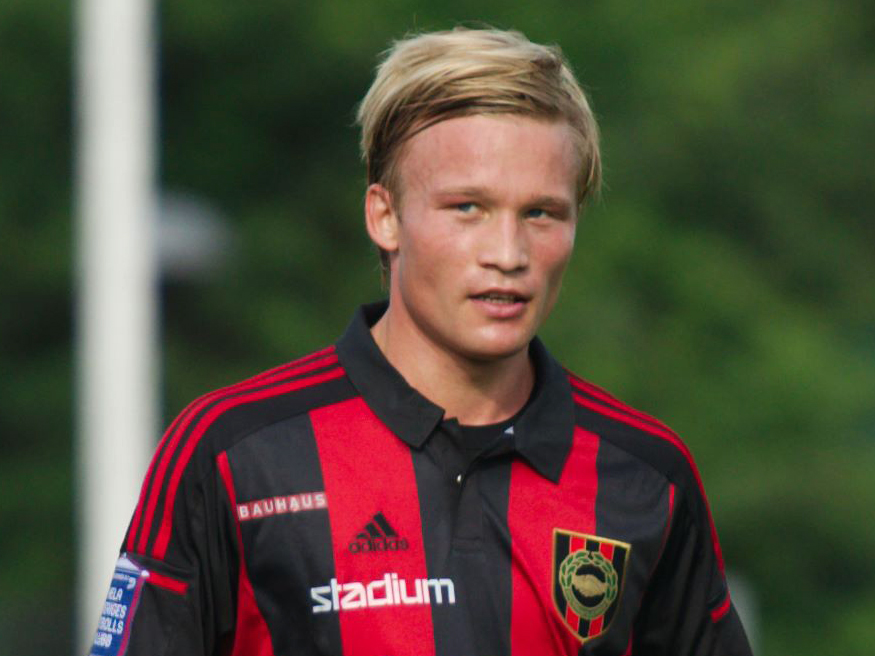
Bärkroth in 2014, while at Brommapojkarna

Bärkroth became the youngest player ever to play in the highest Swedish football league, Allsvenskan, at 15 years, seven months and 14 days old when he started in IFK Göteborg's match against IF Brommapojkarna on 2 September 2007. The record was previously held by Peter Dahlqvist, who was 15 years, nine months and five days when he made his debut for Örgryte IS in 1971 against IFK Norrköping, they were the only two 15-year-olds ever to play in the history of Allsvenskan, until Sead Hakšabanović in 2015.

On 23 July 2008 he made his UEFA Champions League debut and scored 2 goals in IFK's 4–0 win against S.S. Murata in the second leg of the first qualifying round, coming on as a substitute at half time, making him one of the youngest players to ever score in a UEFA competition.

In July 2011, he was loaned out to IF Brommapojkarna.

Bärkroth joined IFK Norrköping on a three-year deal after his previous club IF Brommapojkarna was relegated in the 2014 Allsvenskan.

On 19 June 2017, he signed a four-year-contract with Polish club Lech Poznań. He made his league debut for the club on 30 July 2017 in a 5–1 home victory over Piast Gliwice. He was subbed on for Maciej Makuszewski in the 63rd minute.

One year after leaving IFK Norrköping, Bärkroth returned to Allsvenskan and Djurgården on a three-and-a-half-year deal. He made his debut for the Stockholm team in a 1–1 draw against GIF Sundsvall at home. In the following season, Bärkroth helped his new team to win the 2019 Allsvenskan, together with former IFK Norrköping teammate Emir Kujovic, winning the deciding match on their former home ground in Norrköping. In June 2020, he was forced to miss a couple of months from a knee injury. Bärkroth left Djurgården after the 2021 season after his contract ended and three and half years in the club.

On 1 March 2022, Bärkroth signed with Örgryte for two seasons with an option for a third.

== International career ==
Bärkroth represented Sweden at all youth levels.

In December 2014, he received his first senior call-up, for two friendly games against Ivory Coast and Finland and debuted in the game against Ivory Coast on 15 January 2015.

== Personal life ==
His father, Robert Bengtsson-Bärkroth, played 239 matches in Allsvenskan with Västra Frölunda IF and Örgryte IS.

== Career statistics ==
=== Club ===
As of 20 May 2018

Appearances and goals by club, season and competition
Club	Season	League			National cup (Note: Includes Svenska Cupen, Polish Cup)		Europe		Other		Total	
Club	Season	Division	Apps	Goals	Apps	Goals	Apps	Goals	Apps	Goals	Apps	Goals
IFK Göteborg	2007	Allsvenskan	1	0	0	0	—		—		1	0
IFK Göteborg	2008	Allsvenskan	2	0	0	0	2 (Note: Appearances in UEFA Champions League)	2	—		4	2
IFK Göteborg	2009	Allsvenskan	22	2	2	1	1 (Note: Appearance(s) in UEFA Europa League)	0	—		25	3
IFK Göteborg	2010	Allsvenskan	16	1	0	0	1	0	—		17	1
IFK Göteborg	2011	Allsvenskan	10	1	2	2	—		—		12	3
IFK Göteborg	Total		51	4	4	3	4	2	0	0	59	9
Brommapojkarna (loan)	2011	Superettan	11	6	0	0	—		—		11	6
União de Leiria (loan)	2011–12	Primeira Liga	10	0	0	0	—		—		10	0
Brommapojkarna	2013	Allsvenskan	23	2	4	1	—		—		27	3
Brommapojkarna	2014	Allsvenskan	28	1	1	0	5	1	—		34	2
Brommapojkarna	Total		51	3	5	1	5	1	0	0	61	5
IFK Norrköping	2015	Allsvenskan	18	0	4	2	—		1 (Note: Appearance in Svenska Supercupen)	0	23	2
IFK Norrköping	2016	Allsvenskan	22	4	5	1	—		—		27	5
IFK Norrköping	2017	Allsvenskan	13	2	7	2	2	0	—		22	4
IFK Norrköping	Total		53	6	16	5	2	0	1	0	72	11
Lech Poznań	2017–18	Ekstraklasa	19	0	1	0	4	0	—		24	0
Career total			195	19	26	9	15	3	1	0	237	31

=== International ===
Appearances and goals by national team and year
National team	Year	Apps	Goals
Sweden	2015	2	0
Sweden	2016	2	0
Sweden	2017	2	0
Total		6	0

== Honours ==
IFK Göteborg

- Allsvenskan: 2007
- Svenska Cupen: 2012–13

IFK Norrköping

- Allsvenskan: 2015
- Svenska Supercupen: 2015

Djurgårdens IF

- Allsvenskan: 2019
