= Niclas Bergmark =

Swedish footballer

Personal information
- Date of birth: 7 January 2002 (age 24)
- Height: 1.91 m (6 ft 3 in)
- Position: Defender

Team information
- Current team: Trelleborgs FF
- Number: 22

Youth career
- –2019: Örebro SK

Senior career*
Years	Team	Apps	(Gls)
2019–2024	Örebro SK	94	(0)
2026–	Trelleborgs FF	16	(2)

International career^{‡}
2018–2019	Sweden U17	19	(4)
2019–2021	Sweden U19	5	(0)
2022	Sweden U21	1	(0)
- * Club domestic league appearances and goals as of 16 November 2026 ‡ National team caps and goals as of 17:10, 16 October 2024 (UTC)

Niclas Bergmark (born 7 January 2002) is a Swedish football defender who plays for Trelleborgs FF. He is a grandson of former Swedish international Orvar Bergmark and first cousin of Adam Bergmark Wiberg.

Bergmark left Örebro SK after the 2024 season. He suffered from kidney failure, requiring dialysis and a kidney transplant.

On 23 July 2026, he signed a one-a-and-half-year contract with Trelleborgs FF.
