= Joseph Amoako =

Ghanaian footballer (born 2002)

Personal information
- Date of birth: 13 September 2002 (age 24)
- Place of birth: Ghana
- Height: 1.68 m (5 ft 6 in)
- Position: Midfielder

Team information
- Current team: Samtredia
- Number: 9

Senior career*
Years	Team	Apps	(Gls)
2020–2023	Asante Kotoko	2	(0)
2022	→ Helsingborgs IF (loan)	9	(0)
2023–2024	TFA Dubai		
2024–	Samtredia	9	(1)
- * Club domestic league appearances and goals as of 12 November 2022

Joseph Amoako (born 13 September 2002) is a Ghanaian footballer who plays as a midfielder for Georgian club Samtredia. He previously played for Ghana Premier League side Asante Kotoko.

== Career ==
Amoako started his career with Central Region-based club Young Red Bull, a lower-tier side in Division Two League. In October 2021, Amoako joined Ghana Premier League giants Asante Kotoko on a three-year deal keeping him at the club until 2024.

In February 2022, he joined Helsingborgs IF on a one-year initial one-year loan deal with an option to make it permanent. On 14 February 2022, he played his first match for the club after coming on in the 78th minute in a friendly match against Danish side FC Nordsjaelland which ended in a 4–2 loss to Helsingborgs IF.
