= Frank Odhiambo =

Kenyan footballer (born 2002)

Personal information
- Full name: Frank Onyango Odhiambo
- Date of birth: 29 October 2002 (age 24)
- Place of birth: Kisumu, Kenya
- Height: 1.90 m (6 ft 3 in)
- Position: Defender

Team information
- Current team: Gor Mahia

Senior career*
Years	Team	Apps	(Gls)
2020–2021	Gor Mahia	24	(1)
2022–2025	Djurgården	0	(0)
2022	→ IFK Haninge (loan)	9	(0)
2023	→ Vasalunds IF (loan)	20	(1)
2024	→ AFC Eskilstuna (loan)	23	(1)
2025	→ IF Karlstad (loan)	23	(3)
2026–	Gor Mahia	0	(0)

International career^{‡}
2021	Kenya U23	3	(0)
2021–	Kenya	3	(0)
- * Club domestic league appearances and goals as of 24 November 2025 ‡ National team caps and goals as of 4 June 2026

Frank Odhiambo (born 29 October 2002) is a Kenyan professional footballer who plays as a defender for Gor Mahia and the Kenya national team.

== Playing career ==
The connection with Djurgården was established after Kenyan Michael Olunga played for the Swedish club. Djurgården decided to sign Odhiambo after he played in the 2020–21 CAF Champions League, the 2021–22 CAF Confederation Cup and made his debut with the Kenyan national team.

=== International goals ===
Scores and results list Kenya goal tally first, score column indicates score after each Odhiambo goal

List of international goals scored by Frank Odhiambo
No.	Date	Venue	Opponent	Score	Result	Competition
1	4 June 2026	Lucas Moripe Stadium, Pretoria, South Africa	Lesotho	1–0	1–1	Friendly
