= Adam Bergmark Wiberg =

Swedish footballer

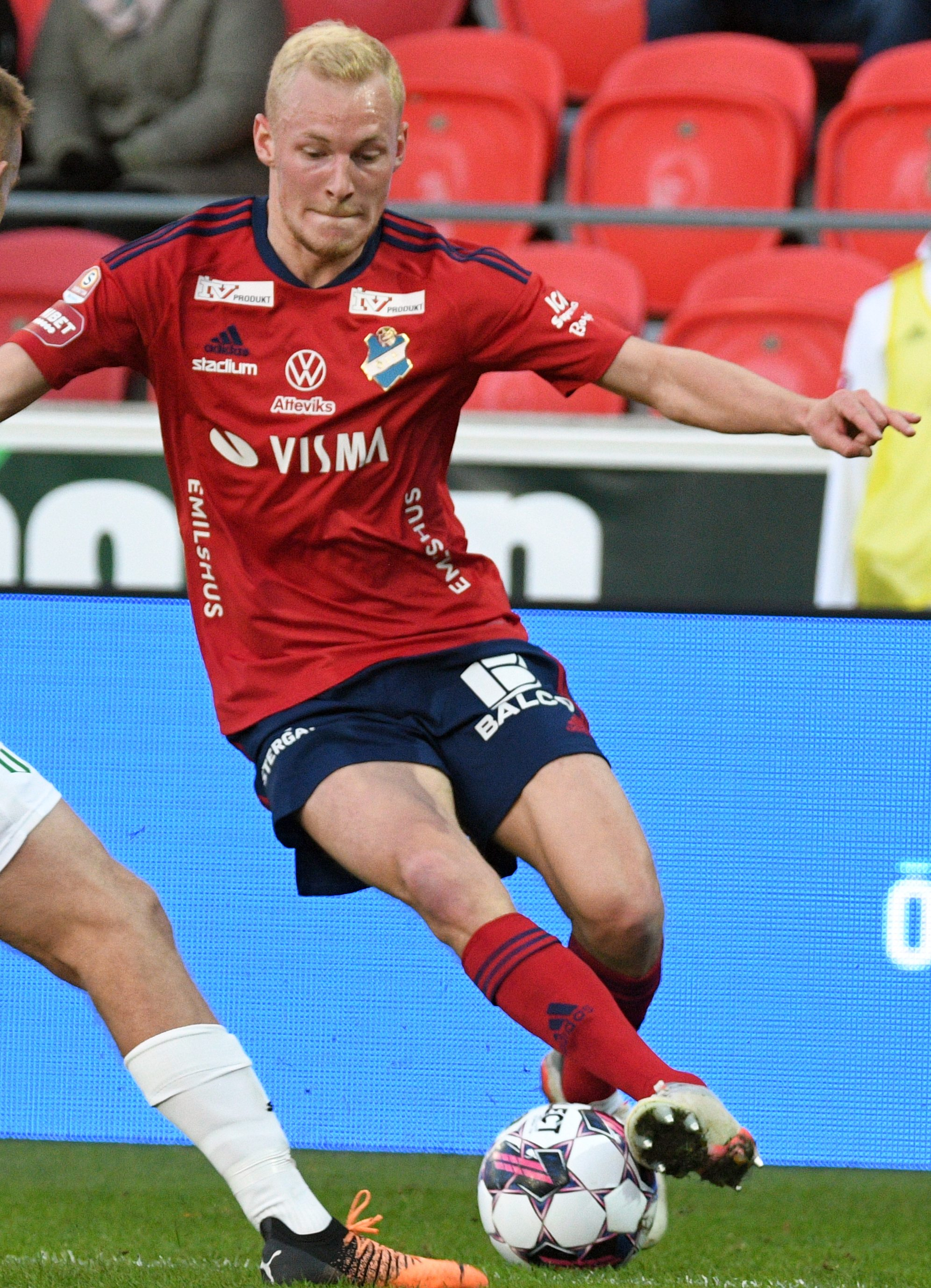
- Bergmark Wiberg in 2022

Personal information
- Full name: Carl Adam Bergmark Wiberg
- Date of birth: 7 May 1997 (age 29)
- Place of birth: Stockholm, Sweden
- Height: 1.82 m (6 ft 0 in)
- Position: Forward

Team information
- Current team: IFK Göteborg
- Number: 29

Youth career
- –2015: Täby FK

Senior career*
Years	Team	Apps	(Gls)
2015–2016	Täby FK	7	(1)
2017–2018	Gefle IF	49	(10)
2019–2022	Djurgårdens IF	5	(0)
2020	→ Örgryte IS (loan)	29	(8)
2021	→ Falkenbergs FF (loan)	29	(7)
2022	→ Östers IF (loan)	16	(4)
2022–2024	Östers IF	73	(31)
2025	Chungnam Asan	16	(4)
2026–	IFK Göteborg	19	(1)
- * Club domestic league appearances and goals as of 19:29, 2 September 2026 (UTC)

Adam Bergmark Wiberg (born 7 May 1997) is a Swedish footballer who plays as a forward for Allsvenskan club IFK Göteborg.

== Club career ==
In January 2019, Bergmark Wiberg joined Djurgården from Gefle.

After initially joining Öster on loan, on 22 June 2022 Bergmark Wiberg moved to the club permanently and signed a contract until 2024.

== Personal life ==
Adam Bergmark Wiberg's grandfather is the Swedish football legend Orvar Bergmark. His cousin Niclas Bergmark plays for Örebro SK.

== Honours ==
=== Club ===
Djurgården

- Allsvenskan: 2019
