= Emmanuel Banda =

Zambian footballer (born 1997)

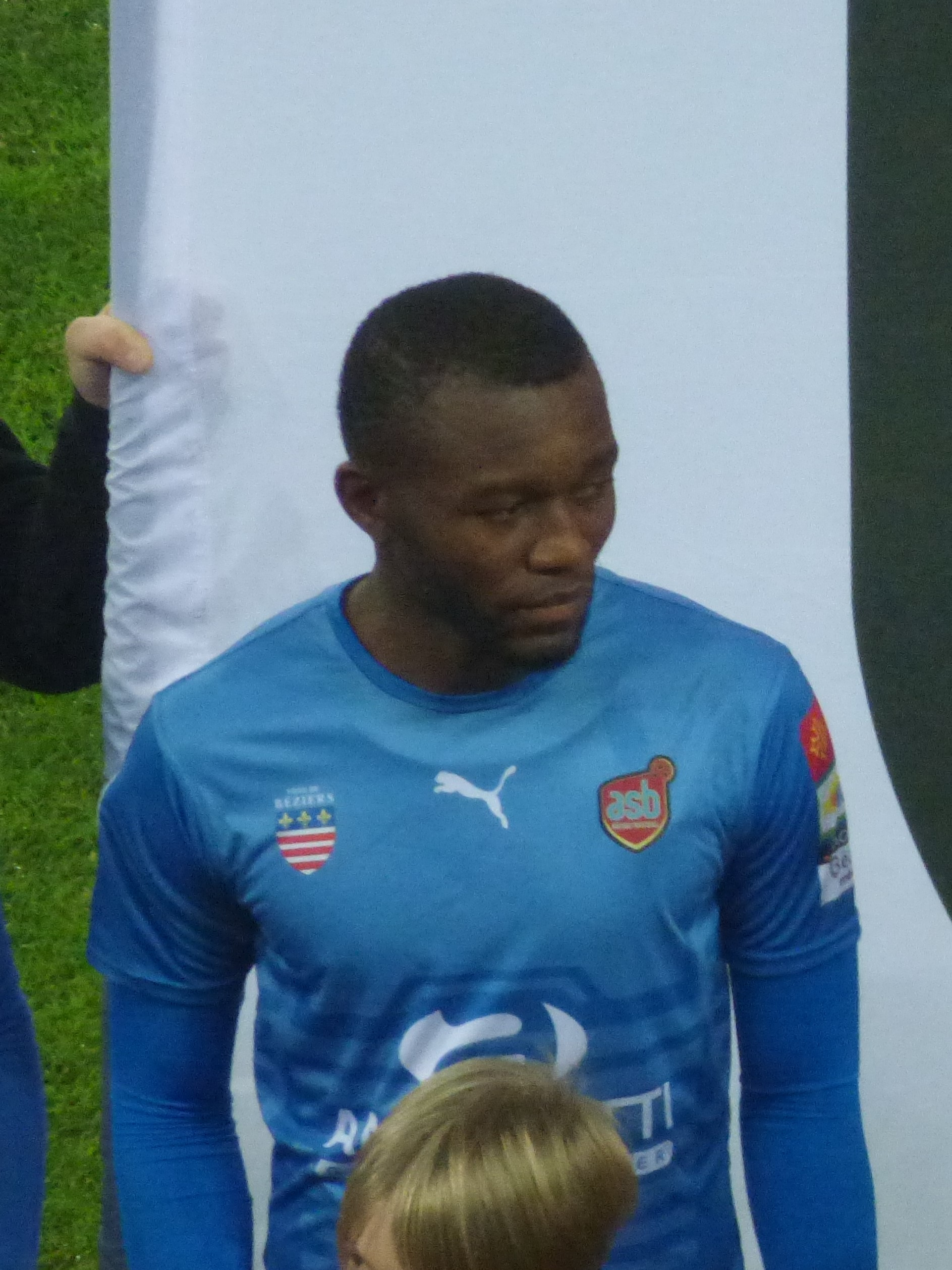

Personal information
- Full name: Emmanuel Justine Rabby Banda
- Date of birth: 29 September 1997 (age 29)
- Place of birth: Chililabombwe, Zambia
- Height: 1.78 m (5 ft 10 in)
- Position: Centre midfielder

Team information
- Current team: Maccabi Bnei Reineh
- Number: 12

Senior career*
Years	Team	Apps	(Gls)
2015–2016	Nchanga Rangers FC		
2016–2017	SC Esmoriz	16	(1)
2017–2020	Oostende	26	(4)
2019	→ Béziers (loan)	13	(0)
2020–2022	Djurgårdens IF	59	(10)
2023–2024	Rijeka	42	(3)
2024–2025	Al-Tai	25	(5)
2025-	Maccabi Bnei Reineh	23	(0)

International career^{‡}
2016–2017	Zambia U20	10	(3)
2017–	Zambia	35	(1)
- * Club domestic league appearances and goals as of 24 June 2026 ‡ National team caps and goals as of 19 November 2024

Emmanuel Justine Rabby Banda (born 29 September 1997) is a Zambian footballer who plays as a centre midfielder for Maccabi Bnei Reineh.

== Club career ==
Emmanuel Banda started his career with Nchanga Rangers FC.

In July 2016, Banda moved to Portuguese club S.C. Esmoriz.

In July 2017, Banda moved to Belgian First Division A club K.V. Oostende on a three-year contract. He made his league debut on 30 July 2017 in a 1–0 home loss to Royal Excel Mouscron. He replaced Michiel Jonckheere in the 75th minute. He scored his first goal in the Belgian top flight on 22 December 2017 in a 3–1 away victory over Waasland-Beveren. His goal, assisted by Knowledge Musona, came in the 52nd minute and gave his side a 2–1 lead. He joined Béziers on loan in January 2019. In February 2020, Emmanuel Banda signed a three-year contract with the reigning Swedish champions Djurgårdens IF.

== International career ==
With those under 20 years of age, he participated in the U-20 Africa Cup of Nations in 2017. In this competition, he scored a goal against Mali. Zambia wins the competition by defeating Senegal in the final.

He then contested the 2017 FIFA U-20 World Cup held in South Korea a few months later. In the junior world, he scored two goals, against Iran, and Germany. Zambia is in the quarterfinals against Italy.

He received his first team selection from Zambia on 5 September 2017, against Algeria, in the 2018 FIFA World Cup playoffs 0–1. In December 2023, he was selected from the list of 27 Zambian players selected by Avram Grant to compete in the 2023 Africa Cup of Nations.
