= Piotr Johansson =

Swedish footballer (born 1995)

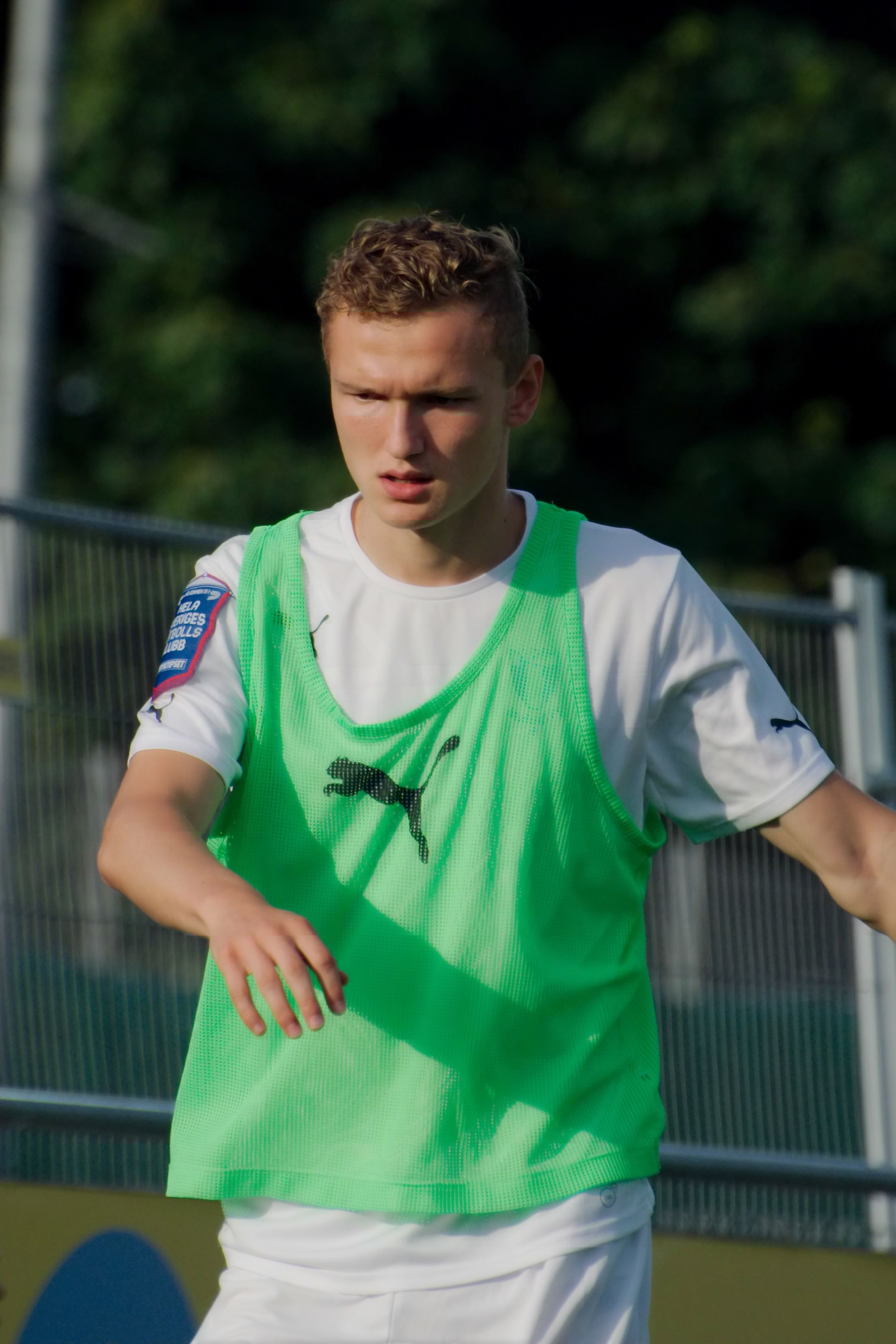

Personal information
- Full name: Piotr Johansson
- Date of birth: 28 February 1995 (age 31)
- Place of birth: Gorlice, Poland
- Height: 1.85 m (6 ft 1 in)
- Position: Defender

Team information
- Current team: Djurgårdens IF
- Number: 2

Youth career
- 2000–2010: Skurups AIF
- 2010–2014: Malmö FF

Senior career*
Years	Team	Apps	(Gls)
2014–2016	Malmö FF	5	(0)
2015	→ Ängelholms FF (loan)	22	(6)
2016	→ Östersunds FK (loan)	7	(0)
2017–2018	Gefle IF	56	(7)
2019–2021	Kalmar FF	71	(4)
2022–	Djurgårdens IF	97	(1)

International career
2010–2012	Sweden U17	17	(2)
- * Club domestic league appearances and goals as of 16 October 2026

Damian Piotr Johansson (born 28 February 1995) is a Swedish professional footballer who plays as a defender for Djurgårdens IF.

== Club career ==
On 10 July 2014 Johansson signed a first team contract on a youth basis with Malmö FF. He had previously made his first team debut in a friendly game against FK Partizan on 27 June 2014 in Belgrade. Johansson made his Allsvenskan debut in a home match against Åtvidabergs FF on 12 July 2014. Johansson went to Superettan side Ängelholms FF on a loan deal on 20 March 2015 for the duration of the season.

== International career ==
Johansson represented the Sweden U17 team a total of 17 times between 2010 and 2012, scoring two goals.

== Personal life ==
Johansson was born in Gorlice, Poland and is of Swedish and Polish descent.

== Career statistics ==
As of 23 April 2022.

Club	Season	League			Cup		Continental		Total	
Club	Season	Division	Apps	Goals	Apps	Goals	Apps	Goals	Apps	Goals
Malmö FF	2014	Allsvenskan	2	0	0	0	1	0	3	0
Malmö FF	2015	Allsvenskan	0	0	0	0	0	0	0	0
Malmö FF	2016	Allsvenskan	3	0	1	0	—		4	0
Malmö FF	Total		5	0	1	0	1	0	7	0
Ängelholms FF	2015	Superettan	22	6	0	0	—		22	6
Östersunds FK (loan)	2016	Allsvenskan	7	0	1	0	—		8	0
Östersunds FK (loan)	Total		7	0	1	0	0	0	8	0
Gefle IF	2017	Superettan	28	3	3	1	—		31	4
Gefle IF	2018	Superettan	28	4	3	1	—		31	5
Gefle IF	Total		56	7	6	2	0	0	62	9
Kalmar FF	2019	Allsvenskan	21	0	0	0	-		21	0
Kalmar FF	2020	Allsvenskan	25	4	3	0	-		28	4
Kalmar FF	2021	Allsvenskan	29	0	2	0	-		31	0
Kalmar FF	Total		75	4	5	0	0	0	80	4
Djurgårdens IF	2022	Allsvenskan	10	0	4	2	0	0	14	2
Djurgårdens IF	Total		10	0	4	2	0	0	14	2
Career total			175	17	17	4	1	0	193	21

== Honours ==
Malmö FF

- Allsvenskan: 2014, 2016
