= Mattias Mitku =

Swedish footballer

Personal information
- Full name: Mattias Mitku Mersha
- Date of birth: 20 July 2001 (age 25)
- Place of birth: Sweden
- Height: 1.77 m (5 ft 10 in)
- Position: Midfielder

Team information
- Current team: Karlbergs BK
- Number: 11

Youth career
- –2017: IFK Tumba
- 2017–2020: Djurgårdens IF

Senior career*
Years	Team	Apps	(Gls)
2020–2022	Djurgårdens IF	3	(0)
2021	→ IFK Haninge (loan)	12	(1)
2022	→ IF Karlstad (loan)	23	(5)
2023	AFC Eskilstuna	12	(0)
2024–2025	Sollentuna FK	50	(8)
2026–	Karlbergs BK	23	(6)
- * Club domestic league appearances and goals as of 16 November 2026

Mattias Mitku (born 20 July 2001) is a Swedish footballer who plays for Karlbergs BK as a midfielder.
