= Elias Andersson =

Swedish footballer (born 1996)

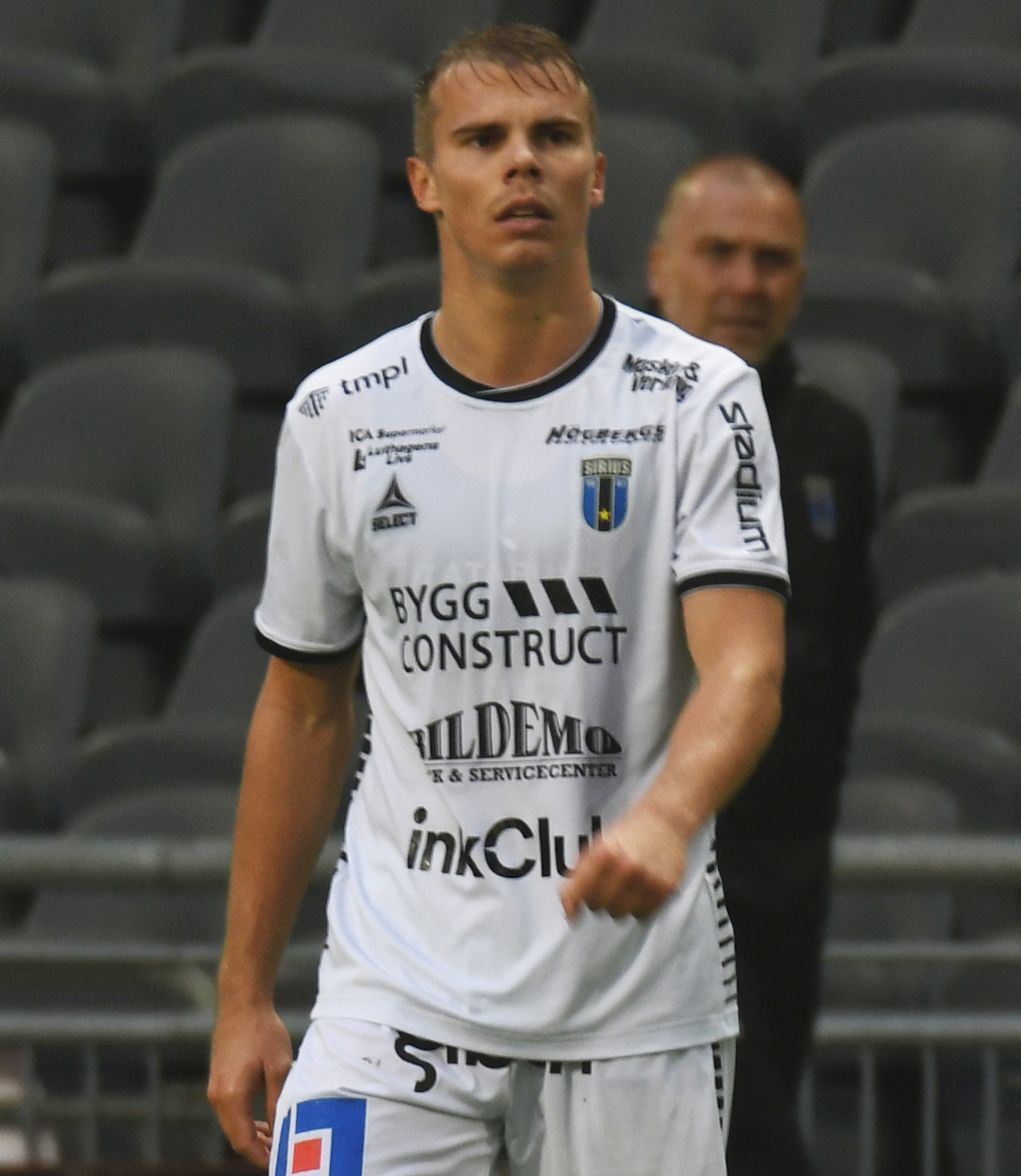

Personal information
- Full name: Nils Erik Elias Andersson
- Date of birth: 31 January 1996 (age 30)
- Place of birth: Gothenburg, Sweden
- Height: 1.78 m (5 ft 10 in)
- Positions: Left-back; central midfielder

Team information
- Current team: Nordic United
- Number: 5

Youth career
- –2010: Hässleholms IF
- 2010–2012: Helsingborgs IF

Senior career*
Years	Team	Apps	(Gls)
2013–2015	Helsingborgs IF	13	(1)
2013	→ HIF Akademi (loan)	6	(0)
2015	→ Varbergs BoIS (loan)	27	(3)
2016–2017	Varbergs BoIS	42	(4)
2017–2020	IK Sirius	69	(8)
2021–2023	Djurgårdens IF	43	(2)
2021	→ Mjällby AIF (loan)	16	(1)
2023–2025	Lech Poznań	27	(0)
2025	→ Viborg (loan)	6	(0)
2025	Randers	0	(0)
2026–	Nordic United	25	(0)

International career^{‡}
2011–2013	Sweden U17	28	(4)
2014–2015	Sweden U19	12	(1)
2023	Sweden	1	(1)
Medal record
Men's football
Representing Sweden
FIFA U-17 World Cup
Third place	2013 UAE
- * Club domestic league appearances and goals as of 12 November 2026 ‡ National team caps and goals as of 21:36, 13 January 2023 (UTC)

Nils Erik Elias Andersson (born 31 January 1996) is a Swedish professional footballer who plays as a left-back or midfielder for Superettan club Nordic United.

== Club career ==
Andersson started out as a youth player for his hometown club Hässleholms IF. In 2010, he joined Helsingborgs IF youth setup instead, although he still kept living in Hässleholm and commuted to Helsingborg. At the start of the 2013 Allsvenskan season, Andersson was moved up to the first team. On 15 April 2013, he became the youngest player ever to play a league game for his club when he made his debut at home against Mjällby AIF.

On 4 July 2023, after spending his entire career in Sweden, Andersson signed a three-year contract with Polish side Lech Poznań, whom he faced off against during Djurgårdens IF's 2022–23 UEFA Europa Conference League campaign. He was to remain with the Swedish club until 18 July.

On 21 January 2025, he joined Danish side Viborg on loan for the remainder of the season. Viborg confirmed on Monday, 2 June 2025, that they would not extend his loan. He finished the season with six total appearances for the club. On 26 August 2025, Andersson and Lech mutually agreed to terminate his contract.

On 8 September 2025, Andersson joined Danish Superliga club Randers on a deal until the end of 2025. He left the club at the end of the year without having made his debut.

== International career ==
In September 2013, Andersson was selected for the Sweden men's national under-17 football team. The team competed in the 2013 FIFA U-17 World Cup, where they went on to place third. He made his full international debut for Sweden on 12 January 2023, scoring from a free-kick in a friendly 2–1 win against Iceland.

== Career statistics ==
=== International ===
Appearances and goals by national team and year
National team	Year	Apps	Goals
Sweden	2023	1	1
Total		1	1

Scores and results list Sweden's goal tally first, score column indicates score after each Andersson goal.

List of international goals scored by Elias Andersson
No.	Date	Venue	Opponent	Score	Result	Competition	Ref.
1	12 January 2023	Estádio Algarve, Faro/Loulé, Portugal	Iceland	1–1	2–1	Friendly	

== Honours ==
Sweden U17

- FIFA U-17 World Cup third place: 2013
