= Balltorps FF =

Swedish football club

- Full name: Balltorps Fotbollförening
- Founded: 1988
- Ground: Förbovallen; Mölndal; Sweden
- Chairman: Lasse Stenberg
- League: Division 5 Göteborg B
Home colours

Balltorps FF is a Swedish football club located in Mölndal.

== Background ==
Balltorps FF currently plays in Division 5 Göteborg B which is the seventh tier of Swedish football. They play their home matches at the Förbovallen in Mölndal.

The club is affiliated to Göteborgs Fotbollförbund.

The first team and group of senior players was founded as late as 2005 but is now considered as well established in the regional football leagues.

With good management and administrative people in the management Balltorps FF is well known as a great platform for players in and around the Gothenburg area, either for further development or taking a step down the tiers.

Current manager of the 2014 season is Erik Börjesson and Edvin Gulz

== Season to season ==
Season	Level	Division	Section	Position	Movements
2006*	Tier 8	Division 6	Göteborg B	1st	Promoted
2007	Tier 7	Division 5	Göteborg B	9th	
2008	Tier 7	Division 5	Göteborg B	4th	
2009	Tier 7	Division 5	Göteborg B	7th	
2010	Tier 7	Division 5	Göteborg B	3rd	Promoted
2011	Tier 6	Division 4	Göteborg B	11th	Relegated
2012	Tier 7	Division 5	Göteborg B	2nd	

* League restructuring in 2006 resulted in a new division being created at Tier 3 and subsequent divisions dropping a level.
