= 2022 IFK Norrköping season =

IFK Norrköping
2022 season
- Chairman: Sakarias Mårdh
- Head coach: Rikard Norling
- Stadium: Nya Parken
- Allsvenskan: 12th
- 2021–22 Svenska Cupen: Quarterfinal vs Hammarby
- 2022–23 Svenska Cupen: Group Stage
- Top goalscorer: League: Christoffer Nyman (11); All: Christoffer Nyman (16)
Home colours	Away colours	Third colours

The 2022 season is IFK Norrköping's 82nd season in Allsvenskan and their 11th consecutive season in the league. They compete in Allsvenskan and Svenska Cupen. League play started on 3 April and will end on 6 November.

== Players ==
As of 30 August 2022

Note: Flags indicate national team as defined under FIFA eligibility rules; some limited exceptions apply. Players may hold more than one non-FIFA nationality.

No.	Pos.	Nation	Player
1	GK	SWE	Oscar Jansson
2	DF	NGR	Godswill Ekpolo
4	DF	DEN	Marco Lund
5	FW	SWE	Christoffer Nyman
6	DF	SWE	Linus Wahlqvist
7	DF	SWE	Jacob Ortmark
8	MF	ISL	Arnór Sigurðsson (on loan from CSKA Moscow)
9	MF	ISL	Arnór Ingvi Traustason
10	MF	SWE	Jonathan Levi
11	DF	SWE	Christopher Telo
14	DF	ALB	Egzon Binaku
16	DF	SWE	Viktor Agardius
17	DF	SWE	Laorent Shabani

No.	Pos.	Nation	Player
18	MF	ISL	Ari Freyr Skúlason
20	DF	NOR	Daniel Eid
21	DF	SWE	Dino Salihovic
22	FW	ISL	Andri Guðjohnsen
23	MF	SWE	Maic Sema
24	DF	SWE	Anton Eriksson
26	MF	SWE	Kristoffer Khazeni
27	MF	ISL	Jóhannes Kristinn Bjarnason
29	GK	SWE	Julius Lindgren
31	DF	SWE	Edvin Tellgren
32	GK	SWE	Wille Jakobsson
36	DF	BRA	Jean

=== Out on loan ===
Note: Flags indicate national team as defined under FIFA eligibility rules; some limited exceptions apply. Players may hold more than one non-FIFA nationality.

No.	Pos.	Nation	Player
17	DF	SWE	Theo Rask (at Västerås SK until the end of the 2022 season)
22	DF	HON	Kevin Álvarez (at Real España until 31 December 2022)
28	DF	ISL	Oliver Stefansson (at ÍA until the end of the 2022 season)

== Competitions ==
=== Overview ===
Competition	First match	Last match	Starting round	Final position	Record							
Competition	First match	Last match	Starting round	Final position	Pld	W	D	L	GF	GA	GD	Win %
Allsvenskan	3 April 2022	6 November 2022	Matchday 1	12th	30	8	10	12	40	42	−2	26.67
2021–22 Svenska Cupen	19 February 2022	13 March 2022	Group stage	Quarterfinal	4	2	1	1	9	5	+4	50.00
2022–23 Svenska Cupen	1 September 2022	11 March 2023	Second Round	Quarter-finals	5	3	1	1	10	6	+4	60.00
Total					39	13	12	14	59	53	+6	33.33

Last updated: 18 August 2023
Source: Competitions

=== Allsvenskan ===
==== League table ====
Pos	Team	Pld	W	D	L	GF	GA	GD	Pts	Qualification or relegation
10	IFK Värnamo	30	9	10	11	34	47	−13	37	
11	IK Sirius	30	9	8	13	31	42	−11	35	
12	IFK Norrköping	30	8	10	12	40	42	−2	34	
13	Degerfors IF	30	7	10	13	32	49	−17	31	
14	Varbergs BoIS (O)	30	8	7	15	31	57	−26	31	Qualification for the relegation play-offs

Source: svenskfotboll.se (in Swedish)
Rules for classification: 1) Points; 2) Goal difference; 3) Goals scored; 4) Head-to-head points; 5) Head-to-head goal difference; 6) Head-to-head away goals scored; 7) Play-off
(Note: Play-off is only played if need to decide champion, teams for relegation or UEFA competition and will be played on a neutral ground).
(O) Play-off winners

==== Results summary ====
Overall								Home						Away					
Pld	W	D	L	GF	GA	GD	Pts	W	D	L	GF	GA	GD	W	D	L	GF	GA	GD
30	8	10	12	40	42	−2	34	5	4	6	24	20	+4	3	6	6	16	22	−6

Last updated: 6 November 2022.
Source: svenskfotboll.se (in Swedish)

==== Results by round ====
Round	1	2	3	4	5	6	7	8	9	10	11	12	13	14	15	16	17	18	19	20	21	22	23	24	25	26	27	28	29	30
Ground	H	A	A	H	A	H	A	H	A	H	A	H	A	H	A	H	A	H	A	H	A	H	A	H	A	H	A	H	H	A
Result	L	L	L	D	W	W	W	W	L	D	D	L	D	L	L	L	W	D	L	D	W	L	D	W	D	L	W	D	L	D
Position	12	14	14	15	13	10	10	7	10	9	10	11	11	11	11	12	11	11	11	11	11	12	11	11	11	12	11	11	12	12

Updated to match(es) played on 6 November 2022. Source: everysport.com
A = Away; H = Home; W = Win; D = Draw; L = Loss

==== Matches ====
3 April 2022 1	IFK Norrköping	0–1	Varbergs BoIS	Norrköping
17:30 CEST (UTC+2)		Report	Stanisic (yellow card) 7'; Birkfeldt (yellow card) 47'; Johansson 62'; Matthews (yellow card) 73'; Alfonsi (yellow card) 90+4'	Stadium: Nya Parken; Referee: Mohammed Al-Hakim

10 April 2022 2	AIK	1–0	IFK Norrköping	Stockholm
17:30 CEST (UTC+2)	Milošević 15' (yellow card) 48'; Ayari (yellow card) 32'; Lustig (yellow card) 40'; Larsson (yellow card) 65'; Nordfeldt (yellow card) 90+4'	Report	Markovic (yellow card) 75'	Stadium: Friends Arena; Referee: Kristoffer Karlsson

16 April 2022 3	Djurgården	2–1	IFK Norrköping	Stockholm
15:00 CEST (UTC+2)	Johansson (yellow card) 16'; Eriksson (yellow card) 40'; Edvardsen (yellow card) 63'; Banda 68'; Asoro 85' (yellow card) 85'	Report	Levi 29'; Nyman (penalty missed) 62'; Jean (yellow card) 64'; Abdulrazak (yellow card) 65'	Stadium: Tele2 Arena; Referee: Kaspar Sjöberg

20 April 2022 4	IFK Norrköping	1–1	Häcken	Norrköping
19:00 CEST (UTC+2)	Ortmark 35'; Jean (yellow card) 79'	Report	Hovland 23'; Berggren (yellow card) 63'; Friðriksson (yellow card) 79'	Stadium: Nya Parken; Referee: Granit Maqedonci

26 April 2022 5	Kalmar	1–2	IFK Norrköping	Kalmar
19:00 CEST (UTC+2)	Jansson 67'; K.Jensen (yellow card) 89'	Report	Markovic 6'; Levi 42'; Wahlqvist (yellow card) 68'; D.Eid (yellow card) 90+4'; Jansson (yellow card) 90+7'	Stadium: Guldfågeln Arena; Referee: Granit Maqedonci

2 May 2022 6	IFK Norrköping	2–0	IFK Värnamo	Norrköping
19:00 CEST (UTC+2)	Levi 55'; Ekpolo (yellow card) 58'; Nyman 73' (yellow card) 88'; Jean (yellow card) 76'	Report		Stadium: Nya Parken; Referee: Fredrik Klitte

9 May 2022 7	Helsingborg	0–1	IFK Norrköping	Helsingborg
19:00 CEST (UTC+2)	Ejupi (yellow card) 13'; Widell (yellow card) 42'	Report	Levi (yellow card) 29'; Nyman 70'	Stadium: Olympia; Referee: Mohammed Al-Hakim

15 May 2022 8	IFK Norrköping	5–1	GIF Sundsvall	Norrköping
17:30 CEST (UTC+2)	Nyman 6'; Levi 27', 39'; Ortmark 31', 70'	Report	D.Stensson (yellow card) 51'; Ylätupa 79'	Stadium: Nya Parken; Referee: Adam Ladebäck

22 May 2022 9	Hammarby	3–0	IFK Norrköping	Stockholm
15:00 CEST (UTC+2)	Sandberg (yellow card) 24'; Bojanić 32', 61'; Fenger (yellow card) 45+2'; Sadiku (yellow card) 58'; Selmani 71'	Report	Jean (yellow card) 63'; Ortmark (yellow card) 69'; Abdulrazak (yellow card) 90+3'	Stadium: Tele2 Arena; Referee: Kaspar Sjöberg

29 May 2022 10	IFK Norrköping	2–2	IF Elfsborg	Norrköping
15:00 CEST (UTC+2)	Nyman 41', 76'; Abdulrazak (yellow card) 62'	Report	D.Eid 12' (o.g.); Alm 39'; Rømer (yellow card) 90+6'	Stadium: Nya Parken; Referee: Fredrik Klitte

26 June 2022 11	Mjällby AIF	1–1	IFK Norrköping	Hällevik
15:00 CEST (UTC+2)	Johansson (yellow card) 20'; Gustafson (yellow card) 44'; Haliti (yellow card) 49'; Nwankwo 78'	Report	D.Eid 67' (yellow card) 68'	Stadium: Strandvallen; Referee: Granit Maqedonci

3 July 2022 12	IFK Norrköping	0–1	IK Sirius	Norrköping
17:30 CEST (UTC+2)	Markovic (yellow card) 42'; Ortmark (yellow card) 59'	Report	Sugita 57'; Wright (yellow card) 86'; Nilsson (yellow card) 90+3'	Stadium: Nya Parken

9 July 2022 13	Degerfors IF	1–1	IFK Norrköping	Degerfors
17:30 CEST (UTC+2)	Đurđić (yellow card) 45'; Vukojević (yellow card) 87'; Salmon 90+4'	Report	Agardius 6'; Ortmark (yellow card) 21'; D.Eid (yellow card) 39'; Sema (yellow card) 63'	Stadium: Stora Valla; Referee: Bojan Pandzic

16 July 2022 14	IFK Norrköping	0–2	Malmö	Norrköping
15:00 CEST (UTC+2)	D.Salihovic (yellow card) 38'	Report	Zeidan 10'; Thelin 57'; Hadžikadunić (yellow card) 84'; Rakip (yellow card) 85'	Stadium: Nya Parken; Referee: Mohammed Al-Hakim

25 July 2022 15	IFK Norrköping	0–2	IFK Göteborg	Norrköping
19:00 CEST (UTC+2)		Report	Thern 40'; Wendt (yellow card) 75'; Svensson (yellow card) 80'; Yakob 90+3'	Stadium: Nya Parken; Attendance: 9,544; Referee: Kaspar Sjöberg

1 August 2022 16	IFK Göteborg	2–0	IFK Norrköping	Gothenburg
19:00 CEST (UTC+2)	Yakob 30'; Johansson (yellow card) 31'; Carneil 52'	Report	Ekpolo (yellow card) 15'; Skúlason (yellow card) 44'; Markovic (yellow card) 67'; Sigurðsson (yellow card) 80'	Stadium: Gamla Ullevi; Attendance: 15,085; Referee: Victor Wolf

6 August 2022 17	IFK Norrköping	2–0	Degerfors IF	Norrköping
15:00 CEST (UTC+2)	Nyman 33'; Sigurðsson (yellow card) 66' (goal) 90'; Skúlason (yellow card) 66'	Report	Faraj (yellow card) 66'; R.Örqvist (yellow card) 81'; Carlén (yellow card) 87'	Stadium: Nya Parken; Attendance: 6,329; Referee: Granit Maqedonci

14 August 2022 18	IF Elfsborg	1–1	IFK Norrköping	Borås
17:30 CEST (UTC+2)	S.Holmén (yellow card) 19'; Baidoo 33'; Okkels (yellow card) 60'	Report	Ortmark (yellow card) 19'; Skúlason (yellow card) 35'; Lund (yellow card) 50'; Eriksson (yellow card) 55'; Sigurðsson 64'	Stadium: Borås Arena; Attendance: 4,723; Referee: Andreas Ekberg

21 August 2022 19	IFK Norrköping	2–4	AIK	Norrköping
17:30 CEST (UTC+2)	Wahlqvist (yellow card) 25'; Sigurðsson (yellow card) 41' (goal) 90'; Nyman (yellow card) 66'; Sema 90+6'	Report	Bahoui (yellow card) 4' (goal) 38'; Ayari 13'; Papagiannopoulos (yellow card) 19'; Stefanelli 36'; Thill (red card) 41'; Mendes (yellow card) 84'; Ring (yellow card) 90+7'; Otieno 90+8'	Stadium: Nya Parken; Attendance: 12,765; Referee: Kristoffer Karlsson

28 August 2022 20	Varbergs BoIS	1–1	IFK Norrköping	Varberg
15:00 CEST (UTC+2)	Tranberg (yellow card) 34'; Birkfeldt (yellow card) 82'; Carlsson (yellow card) 90+1'; Simović 90+7'	Report	Levi 11'; Ortmark (yellow card) 86'	Stadium: Påskbergsvallen; Attendance: 2,025; Referee: Granit Maqedonci

5 September 2022 21	IFK Norrköping	4–1	Hammarby	Norrköping
19:10 CEST (UTC+2)	Skúlason (yellow card) 34'; Sigurðsson 50' (pen.), 90+6' (pen.); Traustason 71'; Levi (yellow card) 86'; Nyman 89'; Wahlqvist (yellow card) 90+1'	Report	Skúlason 42' (o.g.); Ludwigson (yellow card) 83'; Blažević (yellow card) 87'; Demirol (yellow card) 90+6'	Stadium: Nya Parken; Attendance: 13,078; Referee: Joakim Ostling

11 September 2022 22	Malmö	2–1	IFK Norrköping	Malmö
17:30 CEST (UTC+2)	Thelin (yellow card) 9' (penalty missed) 63' 73'; Olsson (yellow card) 61'; Zeidan 70'	Report	Ortmark 3' (yellow card) 66'; Levi (yellow card) 9'; Lund (yellow card) 62' (yellow-red card) 90'; D.Salihovic (yellow card) 90+5'	Stadium: Eleda Stadion; Attendance: 14,751; Referee: Bojan Pandzic

17 September 2022 23	IFK Norrköping	2–2	Kalmar	Norrköping
5:00 CEST (UTC+2)	Nyman 24'; Guðjohnsen 59'; Shabani (yellow card) 88'; Binaku (yellow card) 89'	Report	Nanasi 47'; Lindahl 86'	Stadium: Nya Parken; Attendance: 6,132; Referee: Kristoffer Karlsson

2 October 2022 24	GIF Sundsvall	1–3	IFK Norrköping	Sundsvall
15:00 CEST (UTC+2)	G.Castro (yellow card) 15'; Corona (yellow card) 21'; Lundström (yellow card) 40'; Andersson (yellow card) 84'; Engblom 89'	Report	Nyman 11', 87'; Ortmark 16'	Stadium: Idrottsparken; Attendance: 2,023; Referee: Joakim Ostling

10 October 2022 25	IFK Norrköping	2–2	Mjällby AIF	Norrköping
19:00 CEST (UTC+2)	Nyman 15'; Traustason 61'; Guðjohnsen (yellow card) 75'; Lund (yellow card) 86'	Report	Gustavsson (yellow card) 41'; Johansson (yellow card) 59'; Nwankwo 75'; Al-Ammari (red card) 85'; Moros 90'	Stadium: Nya Parken; Attendance: 4,265; Referee: Richard Sundell

15 October 2022 26	IK Sirius	2–0	IFK Norrköping	Uppsala
17:30 CEST (UTC+2)	Bjarnason 37' (yellow card) 67'; Mathisen (yellow card) 45'; Matthews 45+3'; Kouakou (yellow card) 56'	Report	Eriksson (yellow card) 54'; Levi (penalty missed) 64'	Stadium: Studenternas IP; Attendance: 4,463; Referee: Kristoffer Karlsson

19 October 2022 27	IFK Norrköping	2–0	Helsingborgs IF	Norrköping
19:00 CEST (UTC+2)	Traustason 18'; Ortmark 72'	Report	Rogne (yellow card) 62'; Davidsen (yellow card) 90+5'	Stadium: Nya Parken; Attendance: 4,622; Referee: Victor Wolf

24 October 2022 28	IFK Värnamo	1–1	IFK Norrköping	Värnamo
19:00 CEST (UTC+2)	A.Magashy (yellow card) 45+1'; Antonsson 89'; J.Dickman (yellow card) 90+3'	Report	Shabani 14'; Jansson (yellow card) 51'; Ekpolo (yellow card) 83'	Stadium: Finnvedsvallen; Attendance: 1,945; Referee: Bojan Pandzic

31 October 2022 29	IFK Norrköping	0–1	Djurgården	Norrköping
19:10 CET (UTC+1)	Wahlqvist (yellow card) 19'; Sigurðsson (yellow card) 70'	Report	Johansson (yellow card) 87'; Radetinac 90+7'	Stadium: Nya Parken; Attendance: 11,622; Referee: Victor Wolf

6 November 2022 30	Häcken	3–3	IFK Norrköping	Gothenburg
15:00 CET (UTC+1)	Larsen 18'; Rygaard 45'; Romeo 59'; Sadiq (yellow card) 71'	Report	Shabani 6', 32'; Sigurðsson 90+5'	Stadium: Bravida Arena; Attendance: 6,408; Referee: Kaspar Sjöberg

=== Svenska Cupen ===
==== 2021–22 ====
===== Group stage =====
Pos	Team	Pld	W	D	L	GF	GA	GD	Pts	Qualification
1	IFK Norrköping	3	2	1	0	7	2	+5	7	Advance to Knockout Stage
2	Varbergs BoIS	3	2	0	1	3	2	+1	6	
3	Östers IF	3	0	2	1	2	3	−1	2	
4	Sollentuna FK	3	0	1	2	1	6	−5	1	

Updated to match(es) played on unknown. Source: Swedish Football Association
Rules for classification: 1) Points; 2) Goal difference; 3) Goals scored; 4) Head-to-head record; 5) Lowest disciplinary points; 6) Highest ranked team

19 February 2022 1	IFK Norrköping	1–1	Öster	Norrköping
17:30 CET (UTC+1)	Ortmark 4'; L.Lima (yellow card) 45'	Report	A.Bonnah 90'	Stadium: Nya Parken; Referee: Richard Sundell

28 February 2022 2	Sollentuna	0–4	IFK Norrköping	Stockholm
19:00 CET (UTC+1)	R.Sundgren (yellow card) 66'	Report	Nyman 15'; E.Stenstrand 28' (o.g.); Jean 35'; Wahlqvist 80'	Stadium: Grimsta IP; Referee: Adam Ladeback

5 March 2022 3	IFK Norrköping	2–1	Varbergs BoIS	Norrköping
15:15 CET (UTC+1)	Rask (yellow card) 26'; Nyman 67', 86'	Report	Zackrisson (yellow card) 24'; Birkfeldt 39' (yellow card) 82'; Johansson (yellow card) 44'	Stadium: Nya Parken; Referee: Mohammed Al-Hakim

===== Knockout stage =====
13 March 2022 Quarterfinal	Hammarby	3–2	IFK Norrköping	Stockholm
16:30 CET (UTC+1)	Magyar (yellow card) 26'; Sandberg (yellow card) 33'; Besara 42' (yellow card) 90+4'; Ekpolo 50' (o.g.); Selmani 57'	Report	Nyman 17', 20'; Jean (yellow card) 33'; Ortmark (yellow card) 45' (yellow-red card) 90+2'; Wahlqvist (yellow card) 90'	Stadium: Tele2 Arena; Referee: Kristoffer Karlsson

==== 2022–23 ====
1 September 2022 Second Round	Täby	0–2	IFK Norrköping	Täby
17:00 CEST (UTC+2)	R.Holm (yellow card) 90+1'	Report	Sema 14'; Sigurðsson 50'	Stadium: Tibblevallen; Referee: Mohammed Al-Hakim

== Squad statistics ==
As of match played 6 November 2022

=== Appearances and goals ===
No.	Pos	Nat	Player	Total		Allsvenskan		2021–22 Svenska Cupen		2022–23 Svenska Cupen	
No.	Pos	Nat	Player	Apps	Goals	Apps	Goals	Apps	Goals	Apps	Goals
1	GK	(Sweden) SWE	Oscar Jansson	34	0	30	0	4	0	0	0
2	DF	(Nigeria) NGR	Godswill Ekpolo	32	0	23+5	0	4	0	0	0
4	DF	(Denmark) DEN	Marco Lund	21	0	15+4	0	0+1	0	1	0
5	FW	(Sweden) SWE	Christoffer Nyman	33	16	26+3	11	4	5	0	0
6	DF	(Sweden) SWE	Linus Wahlqvist	31	1	26	0	4	1	0+1	0
7	MF	(Sweden) SWE	Jacob Ortmark	33	7	28	6	4	1	0+1	0
8	MF	(Iceland) ISL	Arnór Sigurðsson	12	7	11	6	0	0	1	1
9	MF	(Iceland) ISL	Arnór Ingvi Traustason	13	3	12	3	0	0	1	0
10	MF	(Sweden) SWE	Jonathan Levi	34	6	29	6	3+1	0	0+1	0
11	MF	(Sweden) SWE	Christopher Telo	9	0	1+5	0	0+2	0	1	0
14	DF	(Albania) ALB	Egzon Binaku	11	0	2+8	0	0	0	1	0
16	DF	(Sweden) SWE	Viktor Agardius	15	1	11+2	1	1+1	0	0	0
17	MF	(Sweden) SWE	Laorent Shabani	18	3	12+5	3	0	0	1	0
18	MF	(Iceland) ISL	Ari Freyr Skúlason	30	0	21+5	0	4	0	0	0
20	DF	(Norway) NOR	Daniel Eid	33	1	22+6	1	4	0	1	0
21	DF	(Sweden) SWE	Dino Salihovic	11	0	2+8	0	0	0	1	0
22	FW	(Iceland) ISL	Andri Guðjohnsen	14	1	2+11	1	0	0	1	0
23	FW	(Sweden) SWE	Maic Sema	26	2	2+19	1	0+4	0	1	1
24	DF	(Sweden) SWE	Anton Eriksson	17	0	17	0	0	0	0	0
26	MF	(Sweden) SWE	Kristoffer Khazeni	1	0	0	0	0+1	0	0	0
28	FW	(Sweden) SWE	Fritiof Hellichius	6	0	1+5	0	0	0	0	0
31	DF	(Sweden) SWE	Edvin Tellgren	1	0	0	0	0	0	0+1	0
33	MF	(Sweden) SWE	Darrell Tibell	3	0	0+3	0	0	0	0	0
36	DF	(Brazil) BRA	Jean	12	1	8	0	4	1	0	0
Players away from IFK Norrköping on loan:
17	DF	(Sweden) SWE	Theodore Rask	4	0	0+1	0	3	0	0	0
24	GK	(Sweden) SWE	Wille Jakobsson	1	0	0	0	0	0	1	0
25	MF	(Sweden) SWE	Leo Jonsson	1	0	0	0	0	0	0+1	0
Players who appeared for IFK Norrköping no longer at the club:
3	DF	(Israel) ISR	Yahav Gurfinkel	1	0	0	0	0+1	0	0	0
9	FW	(Norway) NOR	Eman Markovic	16	1	10+5	1	0+1	0	0	0
13	MF	(Nigeria) NGR	Ishaq Abdulrazak	14	0	10	0	4	0	0	0
19	FW	(Sweden) SWE	Lucas Lima	15	0	1+10	0	1+3	0	0	0
25	MF	(Sweden) SWE	Filip Dagerstål	11	0	11	0	0	0	0	0

=== Goal scorers ===
Rank	Pos.	No.	Nat.	Player	Allsvenskan	2021–22 Svenska Cupen	2022–23 Svenska Cupen	Total
1	FW	5	(Sweden)	Christoffer Nyman	11	5	0	16
2	MF	7	(Sweden)	Jacob Ortmark	6	1	0	7
2	DF	18	(Iceland)	Arnór Sigurðsson	6	1	0	7
4	MF	10	(Sweden)	Jonathan Levi	6	0	0	6
5	MF	9	(Iceland)	Arnór Ingvi Traustason	3	0	0	3
5	MF	17	(Sweden)	Laorent Shabani	3	0	0	3
7	MF	23	(Sweden)	Maic Sema	1	1	0	2
8	FW	9	(Norway)	Eman Markovic	1	0	0	1
8	DF	20	(Norway)	Daniel Eid	1	0	0	1
8	DF	16	(Sweden)	Viktor Agardius	1	0	0	1
8	FW	22	(Iceland)	Andri Guðjohnsen	1	0	0	1
8	DF	36	(Brazil)	Jean	0	1	0	1
8	DF	6	(Sweden)	Linus Wahlqvist	0	1	0	1
8				Own goal	0	1	0	1
TOTALS					40	9	2	51

=== Clean sheets ===
Rank	Pos.	No.	Nat.	Player	Allsvenskan	2021–22 Svenska Cupen	2022–23 Svenska Cupen	Total
1	GK	1	(Sweden)	Oscar Jansson	4	1	0	5
2	GK	24	(Sweden)	Wille Jakobsson	0	0	1	1
TOTALS					4	1	1	6

=== Disciplinary record ===
No.	Pos.	Nat.	Name	Allsvenskan		2021–22 Svenska Cupen		2022–23 Svenska Cupen		Total	
No.	Pos.	Nat.	Name	Yellow card	Red card	Yellow card	Red card	Yellow card	Red card	Yellow card	Red card
1	GK	(Sweden)	Oscar Jansson	2	0	0	0	0	0	2	0
2	DF	(Nigeria)	Godswill Ekpolo	3	0	0	0	0	0	3	0
4	DF	(Denmark)	Marco Lund	4	1	0	0	0	0	4	1
5	FW	(Sweden)	Christoffer Nyman	2	0	0	0	0	0	2	0
6	DF	(Sweden)	Linus Wahlqvist	4	0	1	0	0	0	5	0
7	MF	(Sweden)	Jacob Ortmark	6	0	2	1	0	0	8	1
8	MF	(Iceland)	Arnór Sigurðsson	4	0	0	0	0	0	4	0
10	MF	(Sweden)	Jonathan Levi	3	0	0	0	0	0	3	0
14	DF	(Albania)	Egzon Binaku	1	0	0	0	0	0	1	0
17	MF	(Sweden)	Laorent Shabani	1	0	0	0	0	0	1	0
18	MF	(Iceland)	Ari Freyr Skúlason	4	0	0	0	0	0	4	0
20	DF	(Norway)	Daniel Eid	3	0	0	0	0	0	3	0
21	MF	(Sweden)	Dino Salihovic	2	0	0	0	0	0	2	0
22	FW	(Iceland)	Andri Guðjohnsen	1	0	0	0	0	0	1	0
23	FW	(Sweden)	Maic Sema	1	0	0	0	0	0	1	0
24	DF	(Sweden)	Anton Eriksson	2	0	0	0	0	0	2	0
36	DF	(Brazil)	Jean	4	0	1	0	0	0	5	0
Players away on loan:
17	DF	(Sweden)	Theodore Rask	0	0	1	0	0	0	1	0
Players who appeared for IFK Norrköping no longer at the club:
9	FW	(Norway)	Eman Markovic	3	0	0	0	0	0	3	0
13	MF	(Nigeria)	Ishaq Abdulrazak	3	0	0	0	0	0	3	0
19	FW	(Sweden)	Lucas Lima	0	0	1	0	0	0	1	0
TOTALS				53	1	6	1	0	0	59	2
