= List of Swedish football transfers winter 2021–22 =

Swedish football transfers

This is a list of Swedish football transfers in the 2021–2022 winter transfer window by club. Only clubs of the 2022 Allsvenskan are included.

== Allsvenskan ==
=== AIK ===
In: Note: Flags indicate national team as defined under FIFA eligibility rules; some limited exceptions apply. Players may hold more than one non-FIFA nationality.

No.	Pos.	Nation	Player
2	DF	SWE	Josafat Mendes (from Hammarby)
12	DF	SWE	Axel Björnström (from (Russia) Arsenal Tula)
18	MF	SWE	Amar Ahmed Fatah (promoted from junior squad)
19	FW	SWE	Jordan Larsson (on loan from (Russia) Spartak Moskva)
22	MF	SWE	Benjamin Mbunga Kimpioka (from (England) Sunderland)
24	DF	SWE	Jesper Ceesay (from Brommapojkarna)
28	DF	SWE	Rasmus Bonde (promoted from junior squad)
29	DF	KEN	Collins Sichenje (from (Kenya) AFC Leopards)
30	FW	KEN	Henry Meja (from (Kenya) Tusker)
32	MF	SWE	Tom Strannegård (loan return from Vasalund)
–	FW	SWE	Calvin Kabuye (promoted from junior squad)
–	DF	SWE	Ahmad Faqa (promoted from junior squad)

Out: Note: Flags indicate national team as defined under FIFA eligibility rules; some limited exceptions apply. Players may hold more than one non-FIFA nationality.

No.	Pos.	Nation	Player
6	DF	KOS	Jetmir Haliti (on loan to Mjällby)
11	FW	SWE	Stefan Silva (released)
14	DF	SWE	Lucas Forsberg (on loan to Sollentuna)
17	MF	GHA	Ebenezer Ofori (on loan to (Denmark) Vejle)
19	MF	FIN	Saku Ylätupa (to GIF Sundsvall)
21	FW	SRB	Bojan Radulović (on loan to (Finland) HJK Helsinki)
22	MF	SWE	Filip Rogić (to Sirius)
28	DF	SWE	Rasmus Bonde (on loan to Vasalund)
31	GK	DEN	Jakob Haugaard (on loan to (Norway) Tromsø)
36	FW	ERI	Henok Goitom (retired)
–	DF	FIN	Robin Tihi (on loan to Värnamo, previously on loan at Eskilstuna)
–	FW	SWE	Calvin Kabuye (on loan to Vasalund)
–	DF	SWE	Ahmad Faqa (on loan to Västerås)

=== Degerfors ===
In: Note: Flags indicate national team as defined under FIFA eligibility rules; some limited exceptions apply. Players may hold more than one non-FIFA nationality.

No.	Pos.	Nation	Player
3	DF	UGA	Ronald Mukiibi (free transfer)
5	DF	USA	Joe Gyau (from (United States) Cincinnati)
6	MF	SWE	Oscar Wallin (from Hudiksvall)
8	MF	CRC	Diego Campos (from (Norway) Jerv)
10	FW	SWE	Dijan Vukojević (from Norrby)
14	FW	MKD	Daniel Krezic (from Varberg)
16	MF	SWE	Rasmus Örqvist (from Norrby)

Out: Note: Flags indicate national team as defined under FIFA eligibility rules; some limited exceptions apply. Players may hold more than one non-FIFA nationality.

No.	Pos.	Nation	Player
3	DF	JOR	Jonathan Tamimi (to Brage)
5	DF	SWE	Oliver Ekroth (to (Iceland) Vikingur)
6	MF	SWE	Nicklas Maripuu (to Brommapojkarna)
8	MF	SWE	Ferhad Ayaz (to (Bosnia and Herzegovina) Borac Banja Luka)
10	FW	SWE	Sargon Abraham (to Örgryte)
14	FW	SWE	Villiam Dahlström (to Halmstad)
16	FW	SWE	Victor Edvardsen (to Djurgården)
18	MF	SWE	Axel Lindahl (loan return to (Norway) Bodø/Glimt)
20	DF	SWE	Christoffer Wiktorsson (released)
–	DF	SWE	Tufve Östlund (to Gute, previously on loan at Karlstad)
–	FW	SWE	José Segura Bonilla (to (Norway) Vard, previously on loan at Åtvidaberg)
–	MF	SWE	Erik Grandelius (to (Norway) Notodden, previously on loan at Åtvidaberg)
–	GK	SWE	Hugo Claesson (on loan to Åtvidaberg, previously on loan at Gute)

=== Djurgården ===
In: Note: Flags indicate national team as defined under FIFA eligibility rules; some limited exceptions apply. Players may hold more than one non-FIFA nationality.

No.	Pos.	Nation	Player
2	DF	SWE	Piotr Johansson (from Kalmar)
8	MF	SWE	Elias Andersson (loan return from Mjällby)
16	FW	SWE	Victor Edvardsen (from Degerfors)
18	DF	SWE	Isak Hien (loan return from Vasalund)
19	DF	SWE	Pierre Bengtsson (from (Denmark) Copenhagen)
23	MF	NOR	Gustav Wikheim (from (Saudi Arabia) Al-Fateh)
24	DF	KEN	Frank Odhiambo (from (Kenya) Gor Mahia)
25	MF	GUI	Amadou Doumbouya (from Diamonds of Guinea)
40	GK	SWE	André Picornell (from Brommapojkarna)
99	MF	MNE	Sead Hakšabanović (on loan from (Russia) Rubin Kazan)

Out: Note: Flags indicate national team as defined under FIFA eligibility rules; some limited exceptions apply. Players may hold more than one non-FIFA nationality.

No.	Pos.	Nation	Player
2	DF	PHI	Jesper Nyholm (to (Thailand) Muangthong United)
4	DF	SWE	Jacob Une Larsson (on loan to (Greece) Panetolikos)
11	FW	ALB	Albion Ademi (on loan to (Finland) Lahti)
14	MF	ZAM	Edward Chilufya (to (Denmark) Midtjylland)
19	MF	SWE	Nicklas Bärkroth (to Örgryte)
20	FW	SWE	Emir Kujović (released)
24	MF	ENG	Curtis Edwards (to (Norway) Stabæk)
25	MF	SWE	Mattias Mitku (on loan to Karlstad, previously on loan at Haninge)
26	DF	SWE	Linus Tagesson (on loan to Täby)
29	FW	JAM	Peter McGregor (loan return to (Jamaica) Duhaney Park, previously on loan at Åtvidaberg)
30	GK	SWE	Tommi Vaiho (on loan to Sirius)
40	GK	SWE	David Celic (to Karlberg)
–	FW	SWE	Adam Bergmark Wiberg (on loan to Öster, previously on loan at Falkenberg)

=== Elfsborg ===
In: Note: Flags indicate national team as defined under FIFA eligibility rules; some limited exceptions apply. Players may hold more than one non-FIFA nationality.

No.	Pos.	Nation	Player
4	DF	SWE	Gustav Henriksson (from (Austria) Wolfsberg)
5	DF	GAM	Maudo Jarjué (from Austria Wien, previously on loan)
13	MF	GHA	Michael Baidoo (from (Norway) Sandnes Ulf)
14	FW	NOR	Oscar Aga (from (Norway) Grorud)
27	MF	SWE	Besfort Zeneli (promoted from junior squad)
32	DF	SWE	Viktor Widell (promoted from junior squad)

Out: Note: Flags indicate national team as defined under FIFA eligibility rules; some limited exceptions apply. Players may hold more than one non-FIFA nationality.

No.	Pos.	Nation	Player
1	GK	NOR	Mathias Dyngeland (to (Norway) Brann, previously on loan at (Norway) Vålerenga)
4	DF	SWE	Christopher McVey (to (United States) Inter Miami)
7	MF	DEN	Frederik Holst (to (Norway) Lillestrøm)
8	MF	SWE	Samuel Holmén (retired)
23	FW	SWE	Prince Isaac Kouame (on loan to Motala)
25	FW	SWE	Jack Cooper-Love (on loan to Skövde, previously on loan at Örgryte)
26	FW	SWE	Marokhy Ndione (to (Denmark) Viborg)
32	DF	SWE	Gustav Broman (to Norrby)

=== GIF Sundsvall ===
In: Note: Flags indicate national team as defined under FIFA eligibility rules; some limited exceptions apply. Players may hold more than one non-FIFA nationality.

No.	Pos.	Nation	Player
3	DF	USA	Forrest Lasso (from (United States) Tampa Bay Rowdies)
11	MF	FIN	Saku Ylätupa (from AIK)
12	FW	HAI	Ronaldo Damus (from (United States) Orange County)
16	MF	SWE	Marcus Burman (from Akropolis)
17	FW	SWE	Alexander Larsson (promoted from junior squad)
22	DF	SWE	Rasmus Lindkvist (from (Norway) Hamkam)
30	MF	USA	Joe Corona (from (United States) Houston Dynamo)
34	GK	SWE	Oscar Linnér (on loan from (Germany) Arminia Bielefeld)
34	GK	SWE	Gustav Molin (loan return from Oskarshamn)

Out: Note: Flags indicate national team as defined under FIFA eligibility rules; some limited exceptions apply. Players may hold more than one non-FIFA nationality.

No.	Pos.	Nation	Player
3	DF	SWE	David Myrestam (retired)
17	DF	SWE	Albin Ekström (released)
33	MF	SWE	Albin Palmlöf (to Selånger)
34	GK	SWE	Gustav Molin (on loan to Oskarshamn)
34	GK	SWE	Oscar Linnér (loan return to (Germany) Arminia Bielefeld)

=== Häcken ===
In: Note: Flags indicate national team as defined under FIFA eligibility rules; some limited exceptions apply. Players may hold more than one non-FIFA nationality.

No.	Pos.	Nation	Player
4	DF	NGR	Franklin Tebo Uchenna (from (Nigeria) Nasarawa United, previously on loan)
5	DF	NOR	Even Hovland (from (Norway) Rosenborg)
15	DF	SWE	Kadir Hodžić (from Mjällby)
18	MF	DEN	Mikkel Rygaard (from (Poland) ŁKS Łódź)
19	MF	SWE	Oscar Uddenäs (from Värnamo)
21	DF	NOR	Tomas Totland (from (Norway) Tromsø)
24	FW	NOR	Lars Olden Larsen (on loan from (Russia) Nizhny Novgorod)
27	MF	CIV	Amane Romeo (from (Ivory Coast) ASEC Mimosas)
28	MF	SWE	Samir Maarouf (loan return from Vasalund)
33	DF	SWE	Sebastian Lagerlund (promoted from junior squad)
37	FW	GHA	Ibrahim Sadiq (from (Denmark) Nordsjælland)
41	FW	MKD	Filip Trpchevski (promoted from junior squad)

Out: Note: Flags indicate national team as defined under FIFA eligibility rules; some limited exceptions apply. Players may hold more than one non-FIFA nationality.

No.	Pos.	Nation	Player
4	DF	FIN	Joona Toivio (to (Finland) HJK)
5	DF	NGR	Godswill Ekpolo (to Norrköping)
10	FW	FIN	Jasse Tuominen (on loan to (Norway) Tromsø)
11	FW	NOR	Tobias Heintz (on loan to (Norway) Sarpsborg 08)
13	MF	CIV	Yannick Adjoumani (on loan to Östersund)
14	DF	ISL	Oskar Sverrisson (to Varberg)
18	MF	SWE	Ture Widestrand (released)
23	MF	SWE	Patrik Wålemark (to (Netherlands) Feyenoord)
24	MF	SWE	William Milovanovic (on loan to Utsikten, previously on loan at Norrby)
27	FW	SWE	Leonardo Farah Shahin (on loan to Qviding, previously on loan at Eskilstuna)
30	GK	SWE	Johan Brattberg (on loan to Utsikten)
32	MF	GHA	Nasiru Mohammed (released)

=== Hammarby ===
In: Note: Flags indicate national team as defined under FIFA eligibility rules; some limited exceptions apply. Players may hold more than one non-FIFA nationality.

No.	Pos.	Nation	Player
3	DF	SWE	Dennis Widgren (loan return from Sirius)
11	FW	GAM	Bubacarr Trawally (from (United Arab Emirates) Ajman)
14	MF	SWE	Dennis Collander (from Örebro)
18	MF	KOS	Loret Sadiku (from (Turkey) Kasımpaşa)
20	MF	SWE	Nahir Besara (from Örebro)
21	DF	SWE	Edvin Kurtulus (from Halmstad)
22	MF	SWE	Joel Nilsson (from Mjällby)
26	DF	SWE	Kalle Björklund (loan return from Västerås)
27	GK	SWE	Sebastian Selin (from Västerås)
31	DF	SWE	Ben Engdahl (promoted from junior squad)

Out: Note: Flags indicate national team as defined under FIFA eligibility rules; some limited exceptions apply. Players may hold more than one non-FIFA nationality.

No.	Pos.	Nation	Player
1	GK	DEN	David Ousted (to (Denmark) Midtjylland)
7	FW	SLO	Aljoša Matko (on loan to (Slovenia) Olimpija Ljubljana)
9	FW	BRA	Paulinho Guerreiro (to (Brazil) São José)
11	MF	MNE	Vladimir Rodić (to Öster)
18	FW	SWE	Filston Mawana (to Åtvidaberg)
20	MF	GHA	David Accam (loan return to (United States) Nashville)
27	DF	SWE	Josafat Mendes (to AIK)
29	FW	CIV	Bayéré Junior Loué (on loan to Hammarby Talang, previously on loan at (Serbia) Železničar Pančevo)
32	DF	CIV	Aziz Ouattara Mohammed (to (Belgium) Genk)
33	MF	NGR	Akinkunmi Amoo (to (Belgium) Copenhagen)
35	DF	SWE	Axel Sjöberg (to Olympic, previously on loan at Brage)

=== Helsingborg ===
In: Note: Flags indicate national team as defined under FIFA eligibility rules; some limited exceptions apply. Players may hold more than one non-FIFA nationality.

No.	Pos.	Nation	Player
4	DF	FRO	Viljormur Davidsen (from (Denmark) Vejle)
8	MF	SWE	Sumar Almadjed (from Landskrona)
11	MF	SWE	Taha Ali (from Örebro)
19	MF	FIN	Lucas Lingman (from (Finland) HJK Helsinki)
23	DF	SWE	Ali Suljić (from Brommapojkarna)
27	MF	GHA	Benjamin Acquah (from (Ghana) Ebusua Dwarfs, previously on loan)
29	MF	GHA	Joseph Amoako (from (Ghana) Asante Kotoko)
30	MF	SWE	Albert Ejupi (from Varberg)
37	MF	SWE	Armin Gigović (on loan from (Russia) Rostov)
40	GK	SWE	Nils Arvidsson (loan return from (Italy) Venezia Primavera)
–	FW	SWE	Amin Al-Hamawi (promoted from junior squad)

Out: Note: Flags indicate national team as defined under FIFA eligibility rules; some limited exceptions apply. Players may hold more than one non-FIFA nationality.

No.	Pos.	Nation	Player
8	MF	EST	Vladislav Kreida (loan return to (Estonia) Flora)
9	FW	NGR	Alhaji Gero (released)
19	DF	ISL	Böðvar Böðvarsson (to Trelleborg)
23	FW	ENG	Noel Mbo (released)
–	FW	SWE	Amin Al-Hamawi (on loan to Torn)

=== IFK Göteborg ===
In: Note: Flags indicate national team as defined under FIFA eligibility rules; some limited exceptions apply. Players may hold more than one non-FIFA nationality.

No.	Pos.	Nation	Player
1	GK	SUR	Warner Hahn (from (Netherlands) Go Ahead Eagles)
2	DF	SWE	Emil Salomonsson (from (Japan) Avispa Fukuoka)
6	MF	IRQ	Amir Al-Ammari (from Halmstad)
11	FW	EST	Erik Sorga (from (United States) D.C. United)
12	GK	ISL	Adam Ingi Benediktsson (promoted from junior squad)
15	FW	SWE	Alfons Nygaard (promoted from junior squad)
19	MF	SWE	Hussein Carneil (promoted from junior squad)
20	DF	SWE	Johan Bångsbo (promoted from junior squad)
26	MF	SWE	Tim van Assema (promoted from junior squad)
28	FW	SWE	Lucas Kåhed (promoted from junior squad)
31	GK	SWE	Gustav Lillienberg (from (England) Southampton U18)
–	DF	NGR	Ogbu Abraham (on loan from (Nigeria) Tiki-Taka International)

Out: Note: Flags indicate national team as defined under FIFA eligibility rules; some limited exceptions apply. Players may hold more than one non-FIFA nationality.

No.	Pos.	Nation	Player
1	GK	GRE	Giannis Anestis (to (Greece) Panetolikos)
9	FW	SWE	Robin Söder (retired)
10	MF	SWE	Patrik Karlsson Lagemyr (to Sirius)
11	FW	ISL	Kolbeinn Sigþórsson (released)
12	GK	SWE	Ole Söderberg (released)
18	MF	SWE	Isak Dahlqvist (to Örgryte)
19	MF	SWE	August Erlingmark (to (Greece) Atromitos)
–	GK	SWE	Tom Amos (to Jönköpings Södra, previously on loan at Utsikten)
–	MF	SWE	Adil Titi (to Brage, previously on loan)
–	FW	SWE	Noah Alexandersson (to (Norway) Moss, previously on loan)
–	DF	NGR	Ogbu Abraham (loan return to (Nigeria) Tiki-Taka International)

=== Kalmar ===
In: Note: Flags indicate national team as defined under FIFA eligibility rules; some limited exceptions apply. Players may hold more than one non-FIFA nationality.

No.	Pos.	Nation	Player
1	GK	BRA	Ricardo Friedrich (from (Turkey) Ankaragücü)
2	MF	SWE	Axel Lindahl (from (Norway) Bodø/Glimt)
3	DF	ISL	Davíð Kristján Ólafsson (from (Norway) Aalesund)
5	DF	SWE	Doug Bergqvist (on loan from (Ukraine) Chornomorets Odesa)
7	FW	SWE	Kevin Jensen (from Landskrona)
11	MF	FIN	Simon Skrabb (free transfer)
23	MF	SWE	Nahom Girmai (from Sirius)
28	DF	SWE	Elias Olsson (loan return from (Netherlands) Groningen)
30	GK	SWE	Jakob Kindberg (from Örebro Syrianska)
32		SWE	Casper Andersson (promoted from junior squad)

Out: Note: Flags indicate national team as defined under FIFA eligibility rules; some limited exceptions apply. Players may hold more than one non-FIFA nationality.

No.	Pos.	Nation	Player
2	DF	SWE	Henrik Löfkvist (to Jönköpings Södra)
3	DF	SWE	Sebastian Ring (to (Poland) Wisła Kraków)
5	DF	SWE	Doug Bergqvist (to (Ukraine) Chornomorets Odesa)
7	DF	SWE	Piotr Johansson (to Djurgården)
11	MF	SWE	Jonathan Ring (to (South Korea) Jeju United)
12	DF	SWE	Malte Persson (to Brage, previously on loan at Oskarshamns AIK)
13	DF	AZE	Emin Nouri (retired)
18	MF	SWE	Johan Arvidsson (to Brage, previously on loan at Oskarshamn)
21	FW	SWE	Edvin Crona (on loan to Åtvidaberg, previously on loan at Oskarshamn)
27	DF	SWE	Viktor Krüger (to GAIS, previously on loan at Oskarshamn)
30	GK	SWE	Tobias Andersson (to Gnosjö)
31	FW	SWE	Nils Fröling (to (Germany) Hansa Rostock)
32	GK	SWE	Lucas Hägg-Johansson (to (Denmark) Vejle)
—	MF	SWE	Hampus Svensson (to Stocksund, previously on loan at Oskarshamn)
—	MF	SWE	Anton Ekeroth (to Eskilstuna, previously on loan at Oskarshamn)
–	FW	SSD	David Majak Chan (loan return to (Kenya) Tusker, previously on loan at Luleå)

=== Malmö ===
In: Note: Flags indicate national team as defined under FIFA eligibility rules; some limited exceptions apply. Players may hold more than one non-FIFA nationality.

No.	Pos.	Nation	Player
9	FW	SWE	Isaac Kiese Thelin (from (United Arab Emirates) Baniyas)
21	DF	BIH	Dennis Hadžikadunić (on loan from (Russia) Rostov)
23	DF	CZE	Matěj Chaluš (from (Czech Republic) Slovan Liberec)
28	MF	SWE	David Edvardsson (loan return from (Denmark) Jammerbugt)
31	MF	SWE	Hugo Larsson (promoted from junior squad)
33	MF	SWE	Amel Mujanic (loan return from Öster)
35	MF	SWE	Samuel Adrian (loan return from Falkenberg)
–	MF	SWE	Hugo Bolin (promoted from junior squad)
–	FW	SWE	Samuel Burakovsky (promoted from junior squad)
–	MF	SWE	August Karlin (promoted from junior squad)
–	DF	CMR	Samuel Kotto (from (Cameroon) APEJES de Mfou)
–	FW	SWE	Melker Widell (promoted from junior squad)

Out: Note: Flags indicate national team as defined under FIFA eligibility rules; some limited exceptions apply. Players may hold more than one non-FIFA nationality.

No.	Pos.	Nation	Player
1	GK	SWE	Melker Ellborg (on loan to IFK Malmö)
9	FW	CRO	Antonio Čolak (loan return to (Greece) PAOK)
15	DF	BIH	Anel Ahmedhodžić (on loan to (France) Bordeaux)
20	MF	NGR	Bonke Innocent (to (France) Lorient)
21	MF	SWE	Peter Gwargis (on loan to Jönköpings Södra)
23	FW	SWE	Marcus Antonsson (to Värnamo, previously on loan at Halmstad)
29	DF	SWE	Noah Eile (on loan to Mjällby)
31	DF	SWE	Franz Brorsson (to (Cyprus) Aris Limassol)
34	MF	SWE	Markus Björkqvist (on loan to Utsikten)
38	DF	SWE	Linus Borgström (to Falkenberg, previously on loan)
–	DF	SWE	Hugo Andersson (to (Denmark) Randers, previously on loan at Värnamo)
–	MF	SWE	Aleksander D. Nilsson (on loan to (Norway) Sandefjord, previously on loan at (Denmark) Jammerbugt)
–	FW	SWE	Amin Sarr (to (Netherlands) Heerenveen, previously on loan at Mjällby)
–	MF	SWE	Hugo Bolin (on loan to Olympic)
–	FW	SWE	Samuel Burakovsky (on loan to Olympic)
–	MF	SWE	August Karlin (on loan to Olympic)
–	DF	CMR	Samuel Kotto (on loan to Olympic)
–	FW	SWE	Melker Widell (on loan to Olympic)

=== Mjällby ===
In: Note: Flags indicate national team as defined under FIFA eligibility rules; some limited exceptions apply. Players may hold more than one non-FIFA nationality.

No.	Pos.	Nation	Player
1	GK	SWE	Noel Törnqvist (loan return from AFC Eskilstuna)
4	DF	SWE	Noah Eile (on loan from Malmö FF)
5	DF	KOS	Jetmir Haliti (on loan from AIK)
9	FW	SWE	Albin Mörfelt (on loan from (Norway) Vålerenga)
12	DF	SWE	Adam Ståhl (from Sirius)
18	FW	SWE	Rasmus Wiedesheim-Paul (on loan from (Norway) Rosenborg)
19	MF	SWE	Ludvig Carlius (loan return from IFK Malmö)
30	GK	SWE	Hugo Fagerberg (promoted from junior squad)
31	FW	NGR	Silas Nwankwo (from (Nigeria) Nasarawa United)

Out: Note: Flags indicate national team as defined under FIFA eligibility rules; some limited exceptions apply. Players may hold more than one non-FIFA nationality.

No.	Pos.	Nation	Player
1	GK	SWE	Pontus Zvar (released)
4	DF	SWE	Max Watson (to (Slovenia) Maribor)
5	DF	SWE	Kadir Hodžić (to Häcken)
9	MF	SWE	Joel Nilsson (to Hammarby)
11	FW	SWE	Amin Sarr (loan return to Malmö)
13	GK	FIN	Carljohan Eriksson (to (Scotland) Dundee United)
18	MF	NZL	Marc Tokich (released)
20	FW	SWE	Hampus Holgersson (to Hässleholm, previously on loan at Asarum)
50	FW	LBR	San Johnson (to (Kazakhstan) Aksu)
96	MF	SWE	Elias Andersson (loan return to Djurgården)
—	DF	MAR	Jasin Khayat (released)

=== Norrköping ===
In: Note: Flags indicate national team as defined under FIFA eligibility rules; some limited exceptions apply. Players may hold more than one non-FIFA nationality.

No.	Pos.	Nation	Player
2	DF	NGR	Godswill Ekpolo (from Häcken)
7	MF	SWE	Jacob Ortmark (from Sirius)
9	FW	NOR	Eman Markovic (from (Norway) Start)
19	FW	SWE	Lucas Lima (loan return from Öster)
20	DF	NOR	Daniel Eid (from (Norway) Sogndal)
21	DF	SWE	Dino Salihovic (loan return from Sylvia)
25	MF	SWE	Filip Dagerstål (on loan from (Russia) Khimki)
30	GK	SWE	Otto Lindell (loan return from Sylvia)
33	MF	SWE	Darrell Kamdem Tibell (promoted from junior squad)
36	DF	BRA	Jean (from Varberg)

Out: Note: Flags indicate national team as defined under FIFA eligibility rules; some limited exceptions apply. Players may hold more than one non-FIFA nationality.

No.	Pos.	Nation	Player
2	DF	SWE	Henrik Castegren (to (Poland) Lechia Gdańsk)
7	MF	SWE	Alexander Fransson (to (Greece) AEK Athens)
9	FW	NGR	Samuel Adegbenro (to (China) Beijing Guoan)
15	FW	SWE	Carl Björk (to (Denmark) Brøndby)
17	DF	SWE	Theodore Rask (on loan to Västerås, previously on loan at Sylvia)
22	MF	SWE	Manasse Kusu (to Öster, previously on loan)
28	DF	ISL	Oliver Stefánsson (on loan to (Iceland) ÍA)
33	MF	SWE	Darrell Kamdem Tibell (on loan to Sylvia)
–	GK	SWE	Felix Jakobsson (to Jönköpings Södra, previously on loan)
–	DF	ISL	Finnur Tómas Pálmason (to (Iceland) KR, previously on loan)
–	MF	SWE	Liam Olausson (to Trelleborg, previously on loan at Sylvia)

=== Sirius ===
In: Note: Flags indicate national team as defined under FIFA eligibility rules; some limited exceptions apply. Players may hold more than one non-FIFA nationality.

No.	Pos.	Nation	Player
4	DF	SWE	Kristopher da Graca (from (Netherlands) VVV Venlo)
7	MF	SWE	Filip Rogić (from AIK)
11	MF	SWE	Filip Olsson (from Landskrona)
15	DF	SWE	Andreas Murbeck (from Landskrona)
17	MF	SWE	Patrik Karlsson Lagemyr (from IFK Göteborg)
19	FW	FIN	Antonio Yakoub (on loan from Assyriska)
21	DF	SLE	Kevin Wright (from Örebro)
26	DF	SWE	Isak Ssewankambo (from Östersund)
29	FW	KOS	Edi Sylisufaj (from Falkenberg, previously on loan)
34	GK	SWE	Tommi Vaiho (on loan from Djurgården)
36	DF	SWE	Noel Hansson (promoted from junior squad)

Out: Note: Flags indicate national team as defined under FIFA eligibility rules; some limited exceptions apply. Players may hold more than one non-FIFA nationality.

No.	Pos.	Nation	Player
4	DF	SWE	Joseph Colley (loan return to (Italy) Chievo)
11	MF	SWE	Nahom Girmai (to Kalmar)
12	MF	SWE	Jacob Ortmark (to Norrköping)
15	MF	SWE	Sam Lundholm (released)
17	DF	SWE	Adam Ståhl (to Mjällby)
19	FW	SWE	Ekin Bulut (to Norrby, previously on loan at Vasalund)
21	DF	SWE	Dennis Widgren (loan return to Hammarby)
24	MF	SWE	Isak Bråholm (to Sandviken, previously on loan)
33	DF	SWE	Tim Olsson (on loan to Täby)
–	MF	SWE	Samuel Wikman (on loan to Umeå, previously loan at Gefle)

=== Varberg ===
In: Note: Flags indicate national team as defined under FIFA eligibility rules; some limited exceptions apply. Players may hold more than one non-FIFA nationality.

No.	Pos.	Nation	Player
5	DF	ISL	Oskar Sverrisson (from Häcken)
11	MF	BRA	Eliton Junior (from (Brazil) Red Bull Brasil)
17	MF	KOS	Ismet Lushaku (from AFC Eskilstuna)
20	FW	SWE	Ali Bdeir (from Olympic)
22	MF	SWE	André Boman (loan return from Ullared)
24	MF	SWE	David Bendrik (promoted from junior squad)
25	MF	SWE	Gustav Bendrik (promoted from junior squad)
28	FW	SWE	Flamur Dzelili (from Oskarshamn)
29	GK	SWE	Fredrik Andersson (from Örgryte)
30	MF	SWE	Joel Sundström (from (Spain) San Pedro)
31	GK	SWE	Viktor Dryselius (loan return from Tvååker)
33	FW	SWE	Jaheem Burke (from Hammarby Talang)

Out: Note: Flags indicate national team as defined under FIFA eligibility rules; some limited exceptions apply. Players may hold more than one non-FIFA nationality.

No.	Pos.	Nation	Player
11	FW	MKD	Daniel Krezic (to Degerfors)
20	MF	SWE	Liam Munther (released, previously on loan at Tvååker)
24	FW	RSA	Ryan Moon (released)
25	DF	RSA	Dean Solomons (released)
27	FW	SWE	Rasmus Cronvall (on loan to Tvååker, previously on loan at Ullared)
29	DF	SWE	Nils Bertilsson (to Tvååker, previously on loan)
30	GK	SWE	Stojan Lukić (retired)
36	DF	BRA	Jean (to Norrköping)
42	MF	RSA	Keanin Ayer (to (Norway) Sandefjord)
88	MF	SWE	Albert Ejupi (to Helsingborg)
95	DF	SWE	Adnan Kojic (to Sylvia)
–	FW	SWE	Gustav Nordh (to Piteå, previously on loan at Gefle)

=== Värnamo ===
In: Note: Flags indicate national team as defined under FIFA eligibility rules; some limited exceptions apply. Players may hold more than one non-FIFA nationality.

No.	Pos.	Nation	Player
3	DF	FIN	Robin Tihi (on loan from AIK)
4	MF	BRA	Evaldo Netinho (from (Brazil) Gremio Esportivo Brasil)
6	DF	SWE	Hampus Näsström (from Sylvia)
14	FW	SWE	Marcus Antonsson (from Malmö)
17	MF	SWE	Jesper Dickman (from (Denmark) Nordsjælland)
19	FW	SWE	Haris Avdiu (from Angered)
22	FW	SWE	Victor Andersson (from Onsala)
23	MF	SWE	Nils Wallenberg (from Brommapojkarna)
24	FW	SWE	Moonga Simba (on loan from (Norway) Brann)
26	DF	SWE	Pontus Kindberg (loan return from Husqvarna)
31	GK	SWE	Hampus Gustafsson (loan return from Ljungby)
—	FW	NGR	Johnbosco Samuel Kalu (from Räppe)

Out: Note: Flags indicate national team as defined under FIFA eligibility rules; some limited exceptions apply. Players may hold more than one non-FIFA nationality.

No.	Pos.	Nation	Player
3	DF	SWE	Hugo Andersson (loan return to Malmö)
4	MF	SWE	Albin Sundgren (to Norrby)
13	FW	NZL	Joel Stevens (to Oskarshamn)
14	DF	BRA	Hugo Leonardo (to (Brazil) Anápolis)
16	MF	SOM	Isse Ismail (to Haninge)
17	MF	SWE	Oscar Uddenäs (to Häcken)
19	FW	SWE	Kevin Karlsson Simola (released, previously on loan at Husqvarna)
22	MF	SWE	Robin Dzabic (to Landskrona)
23	MF	SWE	Benjamin Hajdari (to Åtvidaberg)
–	MF	SWE	Noa Lingeskog (released, previously on loan at Gislaved)
—	MF	SWE	Yedidiah Ndunge Muteba (to Räppe)
