= List of Swedish football transfers summer 2023 =

This is a list of Swedish football transfers for the 2023 summer transfer window. Only clubs contesting the 2023 Allsvenskan are listed.

== Allsvenskan ==
Note: Flags indicate national team as has been defined under FIFA eligibility rules. Players may hold more than one non-FIFA nationality.

=== AIK ===
In:

No.	Pos.	Nation	Player
7	MF	SWE	Anton Salétros (from (France) Caen)
8	MF	KOS	Bersant Celina (on loan from (France) Dijon)
16	MF	DEN	Benjamin Tiedemann Hansen (on loan from (Norway) Molde)
17	MF	DEN	Mads Thychosen (from (Denmark) Midtjylland)
19	MF	BIH	Dino Beširović (from (Hungary) Mezőkövesd)
28	FW	CYP	Ioannis Pittas (from (Cyprus) Apollon Limassol)
30	FW	SWE	Jonah Kusi-Asare (promoted from junior squad)
34	FW	SWE	Benjamin Mbunga Kimpioka (loan return from (Switzerland) Luzern)
35	GK	SWE	Samuel Brolin (loan return from (Denmark) Horsens)

Out:

No.	Pos.	Nation	Player
7	FW	DEN	Viktor Fischer (retired)
8	MF	SWE	Bilal Hussein (to (Germany) Hertha BSC)
16	DF	FIN	Robin Tihi (to (Qatar) Al-Ahli)
17	MF	LUX	Vincent Thill (loan return to (Ukraine) Vorskla Poltava)
21	MF	SWE	Elias Durmaz (on loan to GIF Sundsvall)
–	DF	SWE	Rasmus Bonde (on loan to Örebro, previously on loan at (Norway) Hødd)

=== Brommapojkarna ===
In:

No.	Pos.	Nation	Player
1	GK	SWE	Lucas Hägg-Johansson (from (Denmark) Vejle)
5	DF	NOR	Liiban Abdirahman Abadid (from Trollhättan)
12	MF	SWE	Wilmer Odefalk (from Djurgården)
14	DF	SWE	Jesper Löfgren (on loan from Djurgården)
18	FW	SWE	Alexander Johansson (from Halmstad)
19	DF	MKD	Leonard Zuta (from (Norway) Vålerenga)
21	FW	SWE	Alex Timossi Andersson (from (Netherlands) Heerenveen)
22	DF	IRQ	Rebin Sulaka (from (Thailand) Buriram United)
27	FW	SWE	Zeidane Inoussa (from (France) Caen)

Out:

No.	Pos.	Nation	Player
1	GK	SWE	Oscar Linnér (released)
5	DF	SWE	Viktor Agardius (from Norrköping)
14	DF	SWE	Fredrik Nissen (to (Italy) Milan Primavera, previously on loan at Täby)
16	MF	SWE	Ludwig Malachowski Thorell (to Eskilstuna)
19	FW	SWE	Richie Omorowa (to (Netherlands) Excelsior)
21	MF	SWE	Samuel Kroon (from Örebro)
27	DF	SWE	John Mellberg (to (Austria) Red Bull Salzburg)

=== Degerfors ===
In:

No.	Pos.	Nation	Player
4	MF	SWE	Johan Mårtensson (from (Greece) Panetolikos)
13	FW	IRQ	Pashang Abdulla (from J-Södra)
14	MF	SWE	Hugo Bolin (on loan from Malmö)
19	FW	SWE	Jamie Bichis (promoted from junior squad)
29	DF	SWE	Doug Bergqvist (from (Ukraine) Chornomorets Odesa)

Out:

No.	Pos.	Nation	Player
4	DF	SWE	Sean Sabetkar (to (Thailand) PT Prachuap)
12	MF	SWE	Erik Lindell (to (Denmark) AB Gladsaxe)
14	FW	NGR	Fortune Bassey (loan return to (Hungary) Ferencváros)
18	FW	SWE	Albin Mörfelt (to Öster)
26	GK	SWE	Filip Järlesand (on loan to Skövde)

=== Djurgården ===
In:

No.	Pos.	Nation	Player
16	DF	TUN	Rami Kaib (from (Netherlands) Heerenveen)
18	FW	ANG	Felix Vá (from (Cyprus) Apollon Limassol)
22	FW	AZE	Musa Gurbanli (from (Azerbaijan) Qarabag)
26	DF	SWE	Samuel Dahl (from Örebro)
27	DF	SWE	Jacob Une Larsson (loan return from (Greece) Panetolikos)
29	FW	SWE	Noel Milleskog (from Örebro)

Out:

No.	Pos.	Nation	Player
4	DF	SWE	Jesper Löfgren (on loan to Brommapojkarna)
8	DF	SWE	Elias Andersson (to (Poland) Lech Poznan)
10	FW	SWE	Joel Asoro (to (France) Metz)
11	FW	NOR	Oliver Berg (to Malmö)
16	FW	SWE	Victor Edvardsen (to (Netherlands) Go Ahead Eagles)
18	FW	SWE	Jacob Bergström (to Mjällby)
22	MF	SWE	Wilmer Odefalk (to Brommapojkarna)
—	DF	SWE	Axel Wallenborg (on loan to IF Karlstad, previously on loan at (Denmark) AB Gladsaxe)

=== Elfsborg ===
In:

No.	Pos.	Nation	Player
5	DF	GAM	Maudo Jarjué (loan return from (Slovakia) Slovan Bratislava)
6	MF	ISL	Andri Baldursson (on loan from (Italy) Bologna)
7	MF	DEN	Jens Jakob Thomasen (from (France) Nîmes)
14	FW	GHA	Jalal Abdulai (from (Ghana) Inter Allies)
15	FW	SWE	Simon Hedlund (from (Denmark) Brøndby)
20	FW	SWE	Gottfrid Rapp (promoted from junior squad)
24	FW	SWE	Camil Jebara (from Landskrona)

Out:

No.	Pos.	Nation	Player
2	DF	SWE	Gustaf Lagerbielke (to (Scotland) Celtic)
6	MF	DEN	André Rømer (to (Denmark) Midtjylland)
7	FW	SWE	Jacob Ondrejka (to (Belgium) Royal Antwerp)
22	MF	SWE	Kevin Holmén (on loan to Örgryte)
25	FW	SWE	Jack Cooper-Love (on loan to Halmstad)

=== Häcken ===
In:

No.	Pos.	Nation	Player
4	DF	SWE	Aiham Ousou (on loan from (Czech Republic) Slavia Prague)
7	DF	DEN	Jacob Barrett Laursen (from (Belgium) Standard Liège)
8	MF	NGR	Ishaq Abdulrazak (on loan from (Belgium) Anderlecht)
17	FW	ZAM	Edward Chilufya (on loan from (Denmark) Midtjylland)
19	FW	SRB	Srđan Hrstić (from (Serbia) Spartak Subotica)
24	FW	TUN	Amor Layouni (from (Norway) Vålerenga)
33	FW	UGA	John Paul Dembe (on loan from (Uganda) KCCA)
34	FW	CIV	Severin Nioule (from (Ivory Coast) ASEC)
39	FW	SWE	Isak Brusberg (promoted from junior squad)
—	DF	SEN	Abdoulaye Faye (from (Senegal) Diambars)

Out:

No.	Pos.	Nation	Player
4	DF	NGR	Franklin Tebo Uchenna (to (Norway) Sarpsborg 08)
7	FW	CIV	Bénie Traoré (to (England) Sheffield United)
17	DF	SWE	Tobias Carlsson (to Sirius)
19	MF	SWE	Oscar Uddenäs (to (Netherlands) Excelsior)
24	FW	NOR	Lars Olden Larsen (loan return to (Russia) Nizhny Novgorod)
25	DF	DEN	Kristoffer Lund (to (Italy) Palermo)
35	DF	SWE	Sigge Jansson (on loan to Tvååker)
37	FW	GHA	Ibrahim Sadiq (to (Netherlands) AZ)
38	FW	SWE	William Nilsson (on loan to Tvååker)
40	FW	SWE	Anomnachi Chidi (on loan to Ahlafors)

=== Halmstad ===
In:

No.	Pos.	Nation	Player
13	FW	SWE	Jack Cooper Love (on loan from Elfsborg)
24	MF	IRQ	Amir Al-Ammari (from Göteborg, previously on loan)
30	GK	SWE	Marko Johansson (on loan from (Germany) Hamburger SV)

Out:

No.	Pos.	Nation	Player
1	GK	SWE	Malkolm Nilsson Säfqvist (hiatus)
14	FW	SWE	Villiam Dahlström (on loan to Örgryte)
27	DF	SWE	Melvin Sjöland (on loan to Tvååker)
29	FW	SWE	Lorent Mehmeti (to Utsikten)
30	FW	SWE	Alexander Johansson (to Brommapojkarna)

=== Hammarby ===
In:

No.	Pos.	Nation	Player
2	DF	ESP	Marc Llinares (from (Spain) Albacete)
36	DF	SWE	Markus Karlsson (loan return from Hammarby TFF)
39	MF	TUR	İsak Vural (from (Turkey) Fenerbahçe, previously on loan)
44	DF	SWE	Noah John (promoted from junior squad)
45	MF	SWE	Marcus Rafferty (promoted from junior squad)
—	MF	SWE	Wilgot Marshage (from (Italy) Torino Primavera)

Out:

No.	Pos.	Nation	Player
5	MF	SWE	Tesfaldet Tekie (on loan to (Cyprus) Apollon Limassol)
15	DF	SWE	Pavle Vagic (on loan to Helsingborg)
29	FW	CIV	Bayéré Junior Loué (to (Turkey) Göztepe, previously on loan)
48	MF	GUI	Ibrahima Breze Fofana (on loan to (Turkey) Kocaelispor)
—	MF	NIG	Moustapha Amadou Sabo (on loan to (Belgium) Royal Antwerp, previously on loan at Hammarby TFF)
—	MF	SWE	Wilgot Marshage (on loan to Hammarby TFF)

=== IFK Göteborg ===
In:

No.	Pos.	Nation	Player
19	MF	ALB	Arbnor Muçolli (from (Denmark) Vejle)
22	FW	KOS	Astrit Selmani (on loan from (Israel) Hapoel Beer Sheva)
23	MF	ISL	Kolbeinn Þórðarson (from (Belgium) Lommel)
26	MF	SWE	David Perez (on loan from (Italy) Atalanta Primavera)
29	FW	DEN	Thomas Santos (from (Denmark) Horsens)

Out:

No.	Pos.	Nation	Player
4	DF	SWE	Carl Johansson (to (Germany) Holstein Kiel, previously on loan at (Denmark) Randers)
8	MF	NOR	Elias Kristoffersen Hagen (to (Norway) Vålerenga)
16	FW	SWE	Linus Carlstrand (on loan to Utsikten)
18	DF	SWE	Felix Eriksson (on loan to Utsikten)
22	MF	CRO	Filip Ambrož (on loan to Ljungskile)
23	MF	IRQ	Amir Al-Ammari (to Halmstad, previously on loan)
26	MF	SWE	David Perez (on loan to Västra Frölunda)
27	DF	IRQ	Alai Ghasem (on loan to Utsikten)
29	MF	SWE	Johannes Selvén (to (Denmark) OB, previously on loan at Örgryte)
30	MF	SWE	Anton Kurochkin (on loan to Varberg)

=== Kalmar ===
In:

No.	Pos.	Nation	Player
5	MF	SWE	Melker Hallberg (from (Scotland) St. Johnstone)
20	MF	DEN	Jacob Trenskow (from (Denmark) Køge)

Out:

No.	Pos.	Nation	Player
9	FW	DEN	Mileta Rajović (to (England) Watford)
16	MF	FIN	Isak Vidjeskog (to Skövde)
18	FW	SWE	Isak Bjerkebo (on loan to Skövde)
28	DF	SWE	Elias Olsson (to (Poland) Lechia Gdańsk)
—	FW	BRA	Maxwell (to (Brazil) Chapecoense, previously on loan)

=== Malmö ===
In:

No.	Pos.	Nation	Player
14	FW	DEN	Sebastian Jørgensen (from (Denmark) Silkeborg)
17	MF	SWE	Otto Rosengren (from Mjällby)
18	DF	SWE	Pontus Jansson (from (England) Brentford)
20	FW	NOR	Oliver Berg (from Djurgården)
23	MF	NOR	Lasse Berg Johnsen (from (Denmark) Randers)

Out:

No.	Pos.	Nation	Player
1	GK	SWE	Melker Ellborg (on loan to Ariana)
14	DF	SWE	Felix Beijmo (to (Denmark) AGF, previously on loan)
20	MF	SWE	Moustafa Zeidan (on loan to (United Arab Emirates) Hatta)
23	DF	CZE	Matěj Chaluš (on loan to (Czech Republic) Slovan Liberec, previously on loan at (Netherlands) Groningen)
24	DF	DEN	Lasse Nielsen (to (Turkey) Göztepe)
31	MF	SWE	Hugo Larsson (to (Germany) Eintracht Frankfurt)
35	DF	CMR	Samuel Kotto (on loan to Landskrona)
36	FW	KOS	Patriot Sejdiu (on loan to (Netherlands) NAC Breda)
38	MF	SWE	Hugo Bolin (on loan to Degerfors)
40	MF	GHA	Emmanuel Lomotey (on loan to (Cyprus) Ethnikos Achnas)
—	FW	SWE	Samuel Burakovsky (to Landskrona, previously on loan at Olympic)

=== Mjällby ===
In:

No.	Pos.	Nation	Player
4	MF	FIN	Leo Walta (on loan from (Denmark) Nordsjælland)
8	MF	ISL	Guðmundur Baldvin Nökkvason (from (Iceland) Stjarnan)
18	FW	SWE	Jacob Bergström (from Djurgården)
23	DF	SWE	Filip Linderoth (promoted from junior squad)
26	DF	SWE	Rasmus Wikström (from (Denmark) Brøndby)

Out:

No.	Pos.	Nation	Player
4	DF	NGR	Isaiah Ejeh (loan return to (Nigeria) Kwara United)
15	DF	SRB	Ivan Kričak (to Öster)
18	FW	NGR	Yusuf Abdulazeez (on loan to Skövde)
19	MF	SWE	Ludvig Carlius (on loan to Ängelholm)
20	DF	SWE	Johan Persson Åhstedt (on loan to Ängelholm)
23	FW	CHN	Afrden Asqer (loan return to (China) Guangzhou)
25	MF	SWE	Otto Rosengren (to Malmö)
26	MF	SWE	Noah Persson (loan return to (Switzerland) Young Boys)

=== Norrköping ===
In:

No.	Pos.	Nation	Player
2	DF	SWE	Jesper Tolinsson (on loan from (Belgium) Lommel)
8	MF	ISL	Ísak Andri Sigurgeirsson (from (Iceland) Stjarnan)
14	DF	SWE	Yahya Kalley (from (Netherlands) Groningen, previously on loan)
15	FW	SWE	Carl Björk (on loan from (Denmark) Brøndby)
25	DF	SWE	Kevin Höög Jansson (free transfer)

Out:

No.	Pos.	Nation	Player
2	DF	NOR	Niklas Gunnarsson (to (Switzerland) Yverdon Sport)
8	MF	ISL	Arnór Sigurðsson (loan return to (Russia) CSKA Moscow)
17	FW	SWE	Laorent Shabani (on loan to Andorra)
22	FW	ISL	Andri Guðjohnsen (on loan to (Denmark) Lyngby)
36	MF	BRA	Jean (on loan to (Denmark) Horsens)
30	GK	SWE	Otto Lindell (on loan to Skövde)
37	DF	SWE	Kojo Peprah Oppong (on loan to GIF Sundsvall)

=== Sirius ===
In:

No.	Pos.	Nation	Player
4	DF	SWE	Henrik Castegren (free transfer)
5	DF	SWE	Tobias Carlsson (from Häcken)
6	MF	NED	Joeri de Kamps (from (Poland) Lechia Gdańsk)
9	FW	DEN	Wessam Abou Ali (from (Denmark) Vendsyssel)
25	GK	POL	Filip Majchrowicz (on loan from (Poland) Radomiak Radom)
31	DF	SWE	Malcolm Jeng (promoted from junior squad)
32	MF	SWE	Harun Ibrahim (on loan from (Norway) Molde)
36	MF	SWE	August Ljungberg (promoted from junior squad)

Out:

No.	Pos.	Nation	Player
4	DF	SWE	Kristopher da Graca (on loan to (Finland) HJK)
5	MF	SWE	Jamie Roche (to (Switzerland) Lausanne)
6	DF	DEN	Marcus Mathisen (to (Germany) SV Wehen Wiesbaden)
9	FW	SWE	Christian Kouakou (to (Turkey) Kocaelispor)
28	FW	DEN	Magnus Kaastrup (loan return to (Denmark) Lyngby)
29	FW	KOS	Edi Sylisufaj (on loan to Örgryte)

=== Varberg ===
In:

No.	Pos.	Nation	Player
9	MF	SWE	Anton Kurochkin (on loan from IFK Göteborg)
11	FW	DEN	Agon Mucolli (on loan from (Denmark) OB)
17	FW	DEN	Mads Borchers (from (Faroe Islands) HB)
19	FW	NOR	Kristoffer Hoven (from (Norway) Skeid)

Out:

No.	Pos.	Nation	Player
2	DF	SWE	Jon Birkfeldt (to Helsingborg)
4	DF	SWE	Oliver Stanisic (to (Denmark) Horsens)
8	MF	RSA	Luke Le Roux (to (Netherlands) Volendam)
9	FW	BRA	João Paulo (released)
11	MF	BRA	Éliton Júnior (on loan to (Finland) KuPS)
17	FW	SWE	Assad Al Hamlawi (to Ängelholm)
19	MF	GBS	Júnior Pussick (released)
28	FW	SWE	Marcly Tshikupe (on loan to Oskarshamn)
30	MF	SWE	Joel Sundström (to Lund)
36	FW	SWE	Ömür Pektas (to Stocksund)

=== Värnamo ===
In:

No.	Pos.	Nation	Player
15	MF	SWE	Carl Johansson (from (Netherlands) VVV Venlo)
17	FW	SWE	Fred Bozicevic (promoted from junior squad)
—	DF	SWE	Emin Hasic (from (Italy) Lecce Primavera)

Out:

No.	Pos.	Nation	Player
17	MF	SWE	Jesper Dickman (to Trelleborg)
23	MF	SWE	Nils Wallenberg (on loan to Norrby)
33	DF	BRA	Bernardo Vilar (on loan to Helsingborg)
