= 2022 Allsvenskan =

98th season of Allsvenskan

Allsvenskan
- Season: 2022
- Dates: 2 April 2022 – 6 November 2022
- Champions: BK Häcken; 1st Allsvenskan title 1st Swedish title
- Relegated: Helsingborgs IF; GIF Sundsvall
- Champions League: BK Häcken
- Europa Conference League: Djurgårdens IF; Hammarby IF; Kalmar FF
- Matches: 240
- Goals: 662 (2.76 per match)
- Top goalscorer: Alexander Jeremejeff (22)
- Biggest home win: Djurgårdens IF 5–0 IFK Värnamo (16 July 2022); BK Häcken 5–0 Helsingborgs IF (8 August 2022)
- Biggest away win: Degerfors IF 0–6 IF Elfsborg (1 May 2022)
- Highest scoring: IF Elfsborg 4–4 BK Häcken (31 July 2022)
- Longest winning run: Djurgårdens IF (6 matches)
- Longest unbeaten run: BK Häcken (15 matches)
- Longest winless run: GIF Sundsvall (12 matches)
- Longest losing run: GIF Sundsvall (9 matches)
- Highest attendance: 45,117; AIK 2–2 Hammarby IF (28 August 2022)
- Lowest attendance: 802; Degerfors IF 1–2 BK Häcken (9 April 2022)
- Average attendance: 9,958

The 2022 Allsvenskan was the 98th season since its establishment in 1924 of Sweden's top-level football league, Allsvenskan. A total of 16 teams participated. Malmö FF were the defending champions after winning the title in the previous season.

The 2022 Allsvenskan season began on 2 April and ended on 6 November 2022 (not including play-off matches).

== Highlights ==
On 30 October 2022, BK Häcken secured their first Swedish championship title in the 29th and penultimate round by defeating IFK Göteborg, 4–0, in a Gothenburg derby at Gamla Ullevi.

== Teams ==
Location of teams in 2022 Allsvenskan

A total of sixteen teams are contesting the league, including thirteen sides from the previous season, and three promoted teams from the 2021 Superettan (IFK Värnamo, GIF Sundsvall and Helsingborg).

=== Stadiums and locations ===
Team	Location	Stadium	Turf	Stadium capacity
AIK	Stockholm	Nationalarenan (Note: Known as Friends Arena for sponsorship reasons.)	Natural	50,000
BK Häcken	Gothenburg	Nya Rambergsvallen (Note: Known as Bravida Arena for sponsorship reasons.)	Artificial	6,500
Degerfors IF	Degerfors	Stora Valla	Natural	7,500
Djurgårdens IF	Stockholm	Stockholmsarenan (Note: Known as Tele2 Arena for sponsorship reasons.)	Artificial	30,000
GIF Sundsvall	Sundsvall	Idrottsparken (Note: Known as NP3 Arena for sponsorship reasons.)	Artificial	8,000
Hammarby IF	Stockholm	Stockholmsarenan (Note: Known as Tele2 Arena for sponsorship reasons.)	Artificial	30,000
Helsingborgs IF	Helsingborg	Olympia	Natural	16,500
IF Elfsborg	Borås	Borås Arena	Artificial	16,899
IFK Göteborg	Gothenburg	Gamla Ullevi	Natural	18,600
IFK Norrköping	Norrköping	Nya Parken (Note: Known as Platinumcars Arena for sponsorship reasons.)	Artificial	15,734
IFK Värnamo	Värnamo	Finnvedsvallen	Natural	5,000
IK Sirius	Uppsala	Studenternas IP	Artificial	10,038
Kalmar FF	Kalmar	Kalmar Arena (Note: Known as Guldfågeln Arena for sponsorship reasons.)	Natural	12,000
Malmö FF	Malmö	Malmö Nya Stadion (Note: Known as Eleda Stadion for sponsorship reasons.)	Natural	22,500
Mjällby AIF	Hällevik	Strandvallen	Natural	6,750
Varbergs BoIS	Varberg	Påskbergsvallen (Note: Known as Varberg Energi Arena for sponsorship reasons.)	Natural	4,500

=== Personnel and kits ===
All teams are obligated to have the logo of the league sponsor Unibet as well as the Allsvenskan logo on the right sleeve of their shirt.

Note: Flags indicate national team as has been defined under FIFA eligibility rules. Players and Managers may hold more than one non-FIFA nationality.

Team	Head coach	Captain	Kit manufacturer	Main shirt sponsor
AIK	(Eritrea) Henok Goitom	(Sweden) Sebastian Larsson	Nike	Notar
BK Häcken	(Norway) Per-Mathias Høgmo	(Sweden) Erik Friberg	Puma	BRA
Degerfors IF	(Sweden) Andreas Holmberg (Sweden) Tobias Solberg	(Sweden) Johan Bertilsson	Umbro	Various
Djurgårdens IF	(Sweden) Kim Bergstrand (Sweden) Thomas Lagerlöf	(Sweden) Magnus Eriksson	Adidas	Prioritet Finans
GIF Sundsvall	(United States) Brian Clarhaut	(Sweden) Pontus Engblom	Adidas	Various
Hammarby IF	(Spain) Martí Cifuentes	(Sweden) Richard Magyar	Craft	Huski Chocolate
Helsingborgs IF	(Sweden) Mattias Lindström (Brazil) Álvaro Santos	(Faroe Islands) Viljormur Davidsen	Puma	AKEA
IF Elfsborg	(Sweden) Jimmy Thelin	(Sweden) Johan Larsson	Umbro	Sparbanken Sjuhärad
IFK Göteborg	(Sweden) Mikael Stahre	(Sweden) Marcus Berg	Craft	Serneke
IFK Norrköping	(Denmark) Glen Riddersholm	(Sweden) Christoffer Nyman	Adidas	Holmen
IFK Värnamo	(Sweden) Kim Hellberg	(Sweden) Freddy Winsth	Puma	Various
IK Sirius	(Sweden) Daniel Bäckström	(Sweden) Tim Björkström	Select	Various
Kalmar FF	(Sweden) Henrik Rydström	(Norway) Oliver Berg	Select	ICA Supermarket Borgholm
Malmö FF	(Norway) Åge Hareide	(Denmark) Anders Christiansen	Puma	Volkswagen
Mjällby AIF	(Sweden) Andreas Brännström	(Sweden) David Löfquist	Puma	Various
Varbergs BoIS	(Sweden) Joakim Persson	(Sweden) Jon Birkfeldt	Craft	Various

=== Managerial changes ===
Team	Outgoing manager	Manner of departure	Date of vacancy	Table	Incoming manager	Date of appointment
IFK Värnamo	(Sweden) Robin Asterhed	End of contract	18 November 2021	Pre-season	(Sweden) Kim Hellberg	6 December 2021
Hammarby IF	(Serbia) Miloš Milojević	Sacked	13 December 2021	Pre-season	(Spain) Martí Cifuentes	12 January 2022
Mjällby AIF	(Sweden) Anders Torstensson	End of contract	29 December 2021	Pre-season	(Sweden) Andreas Brännström	29 December 2021
Malmö FF	(Denmark) Jon Dahl Tomasson	Mutual consent	30 December 2021	Pre-season	(Serbia) Miloš Milojević	7 January 2022
Helsingborgs IF	(Sweden) Jörgen Lennartsson	Sacked	22 May 2022	15th	(Sweden) Mattias Lindström (Brazil) Álvaro Santos	31 May 2022
IFK Norrköping	(Sweden) Rikard Norling	Sacked	11 July 2022	11th	(Denmark) Glen Riddersholm	8 Aug 2022
GIF Sundsvall	(Sweden) Henrik Åhnstrand	Sacked	28 July 2022	15th	(United States) Brian Clarhaut	28 July 2022
Malmö FF	(Serbia) Miloš Milojević	Sacked	29 July 2022	5th	(Sweden) Andreas Georgson (interim)	29 July 2022
AIK	(Sweden) Bartosz Grzelak	Sacked	19 August 2022	5th	(Eritrea) Henok Goitom (interim)	19 August 2022
Malmö FF	(Sweden) Andreas Georgson	End of interim spell	6 September 2022	7th	(Norway) Åge Hareide	6 September 2022

== League table ==
Pos	Team	Pld	W	D	L	GF	GA	GD	Pts	Qualification or relegation
1	BK Häcken (C)	30	18	10	2	69	37	+32	64	Qualification for the Champions League first qualifying round
2	Djurgårdens IF	30	17	6	7	55	25	+30	57	Qualification for the Europa Conference League second qualifying round (Note: The 2022–23 Svenska Cupen winners qualified for the Europa Conference League second qualifying round. Since the cup winners (BK Häcken) qualified based on league position, the cup winner spot was passed to the second-placed team, and the last Conference League second qualifying round spot was passed to the fourth-placed team.)
3	Hammarby IF	30	16	8	6	60	27	+33	56	Qualification for the Europa Conference League second qualifying round
4	Kalmar FF	30	15	6	9	41	27	+14	51	Qualification for the Europa Conference League second qualifying round
5	AIK	30	14	8	8	45	36	+9	50	
6	IF Elfsborg	30	13	10	7	55	35	+20	49	
7	Malmö FF	30	13	7	10	44	34	+10	46	
8	IFK Göteborg	30	14	3	13	42	39	+3	45	
9	Mjällby AIF	30	11	10	9	33	33	0	43	
10	IFK Värnamo	30	9	10	11	34	47	−13	37	
11	IK Sirius	30	9	8	13	31	42	−11	35	
12	IFK Norrköping	30	8	10	12	40	42	−2	34	
13	Degerfors IF	30	7	10	13	32	49	−17	31	
14	Varbergs BoIS (O)	30	8	7	15	31	57	−26	31	Qualification for the relegation play-offs
15	Helsingborgs IF (R)	30	4	5	21	22	52	−30	17	Relegation to Superettan
16	GIF Sundsvall (R)	30	4	2	24	28	80	−52	14	Relegation to Superettan

Source: svenskfotboll.se (in Swedish)
Rules for classification: 1) Points; 2) Goal difference; 3) Goals scored; 4) Head-to-head points; 5) Head-to-head goal difference; 6) Head-to-head away goals scored; 7) Play-off
(Note: Play-off is only played if need to decide champion, teams for relegation or UEFA competition and will be played on a neutral ground).
(C) Champions; (O) Play-off winners; (R) Relegated

== Positions by round ==
Team ╲ Round	1	2	3	4	5	6	7	8	9	10	11	12	13	14	15	16	17	18	19	20	21	22	23	24	25	26	27	28	29	30
BK Häcken	1	2	7	6	6	6	4	3	2	1	1	1	1	1	2	2	1	1	1	1	1	1	2	2	1	1	1	1	1	1
Djurgårdens IF	2	8	6	5	8	5	6	4	4	4	3	2	2	2	1	1	2	2	3	2	2	2	1	1	2	3	2	2	2	2
Hammarby IF	4	1	1	1	1	1	2	2	1	3	4	4	4	4	4	4	3	3	2	3	3	3	3	3	3	2	3	3	3	3
Kalmar FF	12	7	5	8	11	9	7	9	5	6	6	6	6	6	6	8	7	7	7	7	6	6	6	5	4	4	4	4	5	4
AIK	14	9	11	10	5	4	1	1	3	2	2	3	3	3	3	3	4	5	4	4	4	4	5	6	5	5	5	5	4	5
IF Elfsborg	16	12	10	11	7	7	8	10	7	7	7	8	7	9	10	9	10	10	10	10	9	9	8	7	7	8	7	6	6	6
Malmö FF	7	5	3	4	2	3	3	5	6	5	5	5	5	5	5	5	6	4	5	5	7	5	4	4	6	6	6	7	7	7
IFK Göteborg	4	4	2	2	4	8	9	11	11	10	8	7	8	7	7	6	5	6	6	6	5	7	7	8	8	7	8	8	8	8
Mjällby AIF	3	3	8	3	3	2	5	6	8	8	9	9	9	10	8	7	8	8	8	8	8	8	9	9	9	9	9	9	9	9
IFK Värnamo	9	11	12	14	12	14	14	13	13	12	12	13	13	13	13	13	13	13	13	13	12	11	10	10	10	10	10	10	10	10
IK Sirius	4	5	4	7	10	12	11	8	9	11	11	10	10	8	9	10	9	9	9	9	10	10	12	12	12	11	12	12	11	11
IFK Norrköping	12	14	13	15	13	10	9	7	10	9	10	11	11	11	11	12	11	11	11	11	11	12	11	11	11	12	11	11	12	12
Degerfors IF	15	15	15	16	16	16	16	14	15	15	14	15	15	15	16	14	14	14	15	14	14	15	14	14	14	14	14	13	13	13
Varbergs BoIS	7	10	9	9	9	11	12	12	12	13	13	12	12	12	12	11	12	12	12	12	13	13	13	13	13	13	13	14	14	14
Helsingborgs IF	9	13	13	12	14	13	13	15	16	16	16	16	16	16	14	15	15	15	14	15	15	14	15	15	15	15	15	15	15	15
GIF Sundsvall	9	16	16	13	15	15	15	16	14	14	15	14	14	14	15	16	16	16	16	16	16	16	16	16	16	16	16	16	16	16

Leader
2023–24 UEFA Europa Conference League Second qualifying round
Relegation play-offs
Relegation to 2023 Superettan

Source: Svenska Fotbollförbundet (The Swedish Football Association)

== Results by round ==
Team ╲ Round	1	2	3	4	5	6	7	8	9	10	11	12	13	14	15	16	17	18	19	20	21	22	23	24	25	26	27	28	29	30
AIK	L	W	L	W	W	W	W	D	D	W	D	L	D	W	W	W	L	D	W	D	W	L	D	D	W	W	L	L	W	L
BK Häcken	W	W	L	D	D	W	W	W	W	W	D	D	W	W	L	D	W	W	W	W	D	D	D	D	W	W	W	W	W	D
Degerfors IF	L	L	L	L	L	L	W	W	L	L	D	L	D	L	L	W	L	D	L	W	D	D	D	W	D	D	W	W	D	D
Djurgårdens IF	W	L	W	D	L	W	D	D	W	L	W	W	W	W	W	W	D	W	D	W	W	D	W	L	L	L	W	W	W	L
GIF Sundsvall	L	L	L	W	L	L	L	L	W	L	L	W	D	L	L	L	L	L	L	L	L	L	D	L	W	L	L	L	L	L
Hammarby IF	W	W	W	W	W	D	L	D	W	L	D	L	W	W	W	L	W	W	W	D	L	D	D	D	W	W	D	L	W	W
Helsingborgs IF	L	L	L	W	D	L	L	L	L	L	L	D	L	D	W	D	L	D	W	L	L	W	L	L	L	L	L	L	L	L
IF Elfsborg	L	D	W	L	W	W	D	L	W	D	W	D	D	L	L	D	D	D	D	L	W	W	W	W	L	D	W	W	W	W
IFK Göteborg	W	W	W	D	L	L	L	D	L	W	W	W	L	D	W	W	W	L	L	W	W	L	L	L	L	W	L	W	L	W
IFK Norrköping	L	L	L	D	W	W	W	W	L	D	D	L	D	L	L	L	W	D	L	D	W	L	D	W	D	L	W	D	L	D
IFK Värnamo	L	D	L	D	W	L	L	D	W	W	L	L	D	L	L	W	D	D	D	L	W	W	W	W	D	L	W	D	D	L
IK Sirius	W	D	W	L	L	L	W	W	D	L	L	W	D	W	L	L	W	D	L	L	L	L	L	D	D	W	D	D	W	L
Kalmar FF	L	W	W	L	L	W	W	L	W	D	W	D	D	L	W	L	W	L	W	W	W	D	D	W	W	W	L	D	L	W
Malmö FF	W	D	W	D	W	D	W	L	L	W	W	L	W	W	W	L	L	W	D	L	L	W	W	D	D	L	L	L	W	D
Mjällby AIF	W	W	L	W	D	W	L	D	L	D	D	W	L	D	W	W	D	L	D	W	L	D	D	L	D	L	W	W	L	W
Varbergs BoIS	W	L	W	L	D	L	L	D	W	L	L	W	L	D	L	W	L	D	D	D	L	W	L	D	L	W	L	L	L	W

Source: Soccerstats.com (in English)
W = Win; D = Draw; L = Lose

== Results ==
Home \ Away	AIK	BKH	DEG	DIF	GIFS	HAM	HIF	IFE	IFKG	IFKN	IFKV	IKS	KFF	MFF	MAIF	VAR
AIK		1–2	1–1	1–0	4–0	2–2	2–0	0–1	1–0	1–0	2–2	2–2	1–0	2–0	0–1	1–0
BK Häcken	4–2		2–2	1–2	4–1	1–1	5–0	1–1	0–2	3–3	4–1	4–3	3–1	2–1	1–0	3–1
Degerfors IF	1–1	1–2		3–0	3–1	0–1	2–1	0–6	3–1	1–1	0–0	0–0	2–1	0–2	0–0	1–1
Djurgårdens IF	1–2	0–1	3–1		4–0	1–0	2–2	2–1	3–0	2–1	5–0	4–0	3–2	4–0	0–1	4–0
GIF Sundsvall	0–2	1–5	2–3	2–5		1–5	1–2	0–2	3–2	1–3	1–2	2–3	1–0	2–1	2–0	1–3
Hammarby	3–3	2–2	5–1	0–0	3–0		2–1	3–0	3–0	3–0	1–2	1–1	4–2	0–0	2–0	5–1
Helsingborgs IF	1–2	1–1	1–2	0–2	1–0	0–2		1–0	0–1	0–1	1–4	0–0	1–1	1–2	0–1	1–3
IF Elfsborg	2–2	4–4	1–1	0–0	3–1	2–1	3–0		3–1	1–1	4–1	3–0	0–2	3–2	0–2	4–1
IFK Göteborg	1–0	0–4	2–0	1–1	2–0	0–1	1–3	1–3		2–0	2–1	2–0	1–2	2–1	1–1	1–1
IFK Norrköping	2–4	1–1	2–0	0–1	5–1	4–1	2–0	2–2	0–2		2–0	0–1	2–2	0–2	2–2	0–1
IFK Värnamo	2–3	1–2	2–0	0–0	1–1	1–0	3–2	1–1	1–4	1–1		0–0	1–3	0–0	2–1	1–0
IK Sirius	1–1	0–1	2–0	0–1	2–1	0–3	1–0	2–0	1–2	2–0	2–3		0–0	2–1	0–1	2–3
Kalmar FF	1–0	1–1	2–0	1–0	4–0	2–0	2–0	1–0	1–0	1–2	1–0	1–1		0–1	1–2	1–0
Malmö FF	3–0	1–2	2–2	2–3	3–1	0–0	2–1	1–1	1–0	2–1	0–0	3–1	0–1		2–0	3–0
Mjällby AIF	1–2	1–2	2–1	1–0	1–1	0–3	2–1	1–1	1–4	1–1	1–1	3–0	1–1	1–1		4–1
Varbergs BoIS	2–0	1–1	2–1	2–2	2–0	0–3	0–0	0–3	0–4	1–1	3–0	0–2	0–3	2–5	0–0	

Source: Swedish Football Association (in Swedish)
Legend: Blue = home team win; Yellow = draw; Red = away team win.
For upcoming matches, an "a" indicates there is an article about the rivalry between the two participants.

== Relegation play-offs ==
The 14th-placed team of Allsvenskan will meet the third-placed team from 2022 Superettan in a two-legged tie on a home-and-away basis with the team from Allsvenskan finishing at home.

10 November 2022
19:00

Östers IF	1–2	Varbergs BoIS
Varmanen 21'	Report	Simović 41', 46'

Visma Arena, Växjö
Attendance: 6,705
Referee: Andreas Ekberg
13 November 2022
15:00

Varbergs BoIS	2–1	Östers IF
Tranberg 26'; Carlsson 75'	Report	Westermark 65'

Påskbergsvallen, Varberg
Attendance: 3,738
Referee: Mohammed Al-Hakim

Varbergs BoIS won 4–2 on aggregate.

== Season statistics ==
=== Top scorers ===
As of 6 November 2022

Rank	Player	Club	Goals
1	(Sweden) Alexander Jeremejeff	BK Häcken	22
2	(Sweden) Marcus Antonsson	IFK Värnamo	20
3	(Sweden) Marcus Berg	IFK Göteborg	13
4	(Sweden) Isaac Kiese Thelin	Malmö FF	12
4	(Sweden) Gustav Ludwigson	Hammarby IF	12
6	(Sweden) Pontus Engblom	GIF Sundsvall	11
6	(Denmark) Mikkel Rygaard	BK Häcken	11
6	(Sweden) Christoffer Nyman	IFK Norrköping	11
6	(Sweden) Nahir Besara	Hammarby IF	11
10	(Sweden) Gustaf Norlin	IFK Göteborg	10

=== Hat-tricks ===
Player	For	Against	Result	Date
(Sweden) Alexander Jeremejeff	Häcken	AIK	4–2	2 April 2022
(Sweden) Rasmus Alm	Elfsborg	Degerfors	0–6	1 May 2022
(Sweden) Abdelrahman Saidi	Degerfors	Sundsvall	2–3	9 May 2022
(Sweden) Alexander Jeremejeff	Häcken	Elfsborg	4–4	31 July 2022
(Sweden) Oscar Uddenäs	Häcken	Helsingborg	5–0	8 August 2022
(Sweden) Marcus Antonsson	Värnamo	Helsingborg	3–2	5 September 2022
(Sweden) Victor Edvardsen	Djurgården	Göteborg	3–0	18 September 2022
(Sweden) Ola Toivonen	Malmö	Varberg	5–2	30 October 2022

=== Discipline ===
==== Player ====
- Most yellow cards: 11
  - Jon Birkfeldt (Varberg)
- Most red cards: 1
  - Yasin Ayari (AIK)
  - John Guidetti (AIK)
  - Collins Sichenje (AIK)
  - Vincent Thill (AIK)
  - Peter Abrahamsson (BK Häcken)
  - Kadir Hodžić (BK Häcken)
  - Alexander Jeremejeff (BK Häcken)
  - Nikola Đurđić (Degerfors)
  - Joe Gyau (Degerfors)
  - Sebastian Ohlsson (Degerfors)
  - Alexander Blomqvist (GIF Sundsvall)
  - Joe Corona (GIF Sundsvall)
  - Wilhelm Loeper (Helsingborg)
  - Marcus Berg (IFK Göteborg)
  - Marco Lund (IFK Norrköping)
  - Bernardo Vilar (IFK Värnamo)
  - Wenderson (IFK Värnamo)
  - Dennis Widgren (IK Sirius FK)
  - Jonas Knudsen (Malmö FF)
  - Noah Eile (Mjällby)
  - Amir Al-Ammari (Mjällby)
  - Tashreeq Matthews (Varberg)
  - Felipe Sissé (Varberg)

==== Club ====
- Most yellow cards: 89
  - Varberg
- Most red cards: 4
  - AIK

== Awards ==
=== Annual awards ===
Award	Winner	Club
Player of the Year	(Sweden) Alexander Jeremejeff	BK Häcken
Goalkeeper of the Year	(Brazil) Ricardo Friedrich	Kalmar FF
Defender of the Year	(Norway) Even Hovland	BK Häcken
Midfielder of the Year	(Denmark) Mikkel Rygaard	BK Häcken
Striker of the Year	(Sweden) Alexander Jeremejeff	BK Häcken
Breakthrough of the Year	(Sweden) Hugo Larsson	Malmö FF
Coach of the Year	(Norway) Per-Mathias Högmo	BK Häcken

== Attendances ==
#	Club	Average	Highest
1	Hammarby IF	26,372	30,216
2	AIK	25,276	45,117
3	Djurgårdens IF	19,587	27,203
4	Malmö FF	17,410	20,231
5	IFK Göteborg	14,688	18,056
6	IFK Norrköping	7,974	13,078
7	Helsingborgs IF	7,847	15,800
8	Kalmar FF	6,739	10,024
9	IF Elfsborg	6,495	13,126
10	IK Sirius FK	5,615	10,038
11	BK Häcken	4,719	6,408
12	GIF Sundsvall	3,647	6,175
13	Degerfors IF	3,595	5,880
14	IFK Värnamo	3,380	5,070
15	Mjällby AIF	3,319	6,000
16	Varbergs BoIS	2,672	4,450

== See also ==
Competitions

- 2022 Superettan
- 2022 Division 1
- 2021–22 Svenska Cupen
- 2022–23 Svenska Cupen

Team seasons

- 2022 Djurgårdens IF season
- 2022 Hammarby Fotboll season
- 2022 IFK Göteborg season
- 2022 IFK Norrköping season
- 2022 Malmö FF season
