= Jakob Kindberg =

Swedish footballer (born 2000)

Personal information
- Full name: Karl Jakob Kindberg
- Date of birth: 7 February 1994 (age 32)
- Height: 1.84 m (6 ft 0 in)
- Position: Goalkeeper

Team information
- Current team: Kalmar
- Number: 30

Youth career
- IK Sturehov

Senior career*
Years	Team	Apps	(Gls)
–2014	IK Sturehov		
2015–2017	IFK Kumla	62	(0)
2018–2020	Karlslunds IF FK	71	(0)
2021	Örebro Syrianska IF	30	(0)
2022–	Kalmar FF	31	(0)
- * Club domestic league appearances and goals as of 8 July 2026

Jakob Kindberg (born 7 February 1994) is a Swedish footballer who currently plays as a goalkeeper for Kalmar FF.

Kindberg hails from Örebro where his parents were both employed by Örebro Teater. He grew up in the club IK Sturehov, and started his senior career there, his first appearance coming at the age of 15. While playing as an amateur footballer, Kindberg tried jobs such as teacher, mover, campground host and lifeguard. Sturehov's team won multiple promotions and in 2014 Kindberg played 10 games in Division 3 (the fifth tier) before continuing in IFK Kumla from 2015. With Kumla, he spent 2016 and 2017 in Division 2 before moving one tier further up to Karlslunds IF FK in 2018.

Ahead of the 2021 season, he changed clubs in Örebro, moving to Örebro Syrianska IF. Halfway through the season, Expressen touted him as the second best goalkeeper in Ettan Norra, behind Jonas Olsson.

Kindberg was chosen to replace Lucas Hägg-Johansson in Kalmar FF ahead of the 2022 Allsvenskan season. He made his Allsvenskan debut on 9 October as a substitute. Kindberg did not become first-choice goalkeeper, however, and was rumoured to join Degerfors IF or Örebro SK.

In the 2023 Allsvenskan Kindberg played due to Ricardo Friedrich receiving two red cards, both in July. He was given the chance as the new first-choice goalkeeper in 2024, as Kalmar struggled near the bottom of the table.

On August 26th, 2025, Kindberg started in Kalmar FF's Superettan fixture against Helsingborgs IF, making his debut appearance in Sweden's second tier. Thereby, Kindberg has appeared in all 10 tiers of Swedish football, from Division 8 up to Allsvenskan.
