= Arnór Sigurðsson =

Icelandic footballer (born 1999)

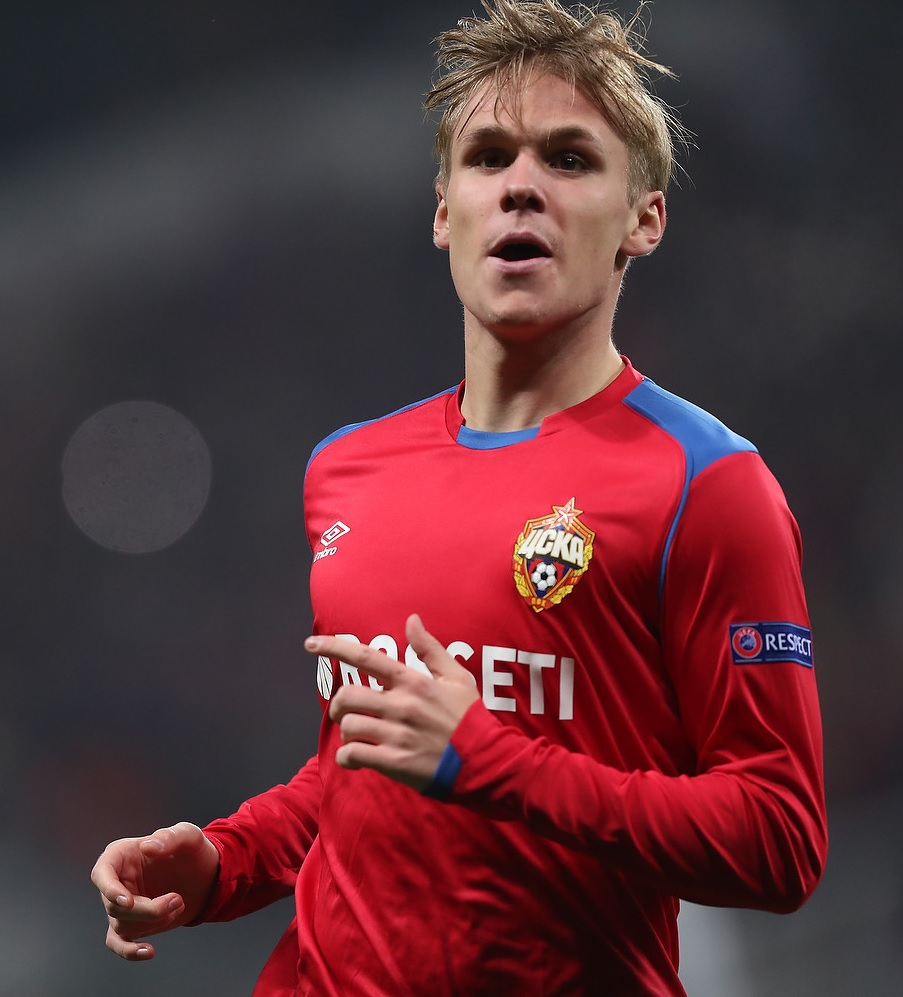
- Arnór with CSKA Moscow in 2018

Personal information
- Date of birth: 15 May 1999 (age 27)
- Place of birth: Akranes, Iceland
- Height: 1.77 m (5 ft 10 in)
- Position: Attacking midfielder

Team information
- Current team: Kalamata
- Number: 10

Youth career
- –2015: ÍA Akranes

Senior career*
Years	Team	Apps	(Gls)
2015–2016	ÍA Akranes	7	(0)
2017–2018	Norrköping	25	(3)
2017	→ Sylvia (loan)	3	(3)
2018–2023	CSKA Moscow	66	(11)
2021–2022	→ Venezia (loan)	9	(0)
2022–2023	→ Norrköping (loan)	21	(11)
2023	→ Blackburn Rovers (loan)	15	(4)
2023–2025	Blackburn Rovers	19	(2)
2025–2026	Malmö FF	17	(1)
2026–	Kalamata	4	(1)

International career^{‡}
2015–2016	Iceland U17	15	(1)
2017	Iceland U19	5	(0)
2018	Iceland U21	5	(1)
2018–	Iceland	40	(2)
- * Club domestic league appearances and goals as of 18 October 2026 ‡ National team caps and goals as of 13 November 2026

Arnór Sigurðsson (born 15 May 1999) is an Icelandic professional footballer who plays as an attacking midfielder for Super League Greece club Kalamata and the Iceland national team.

== Club career ==
=== Norrköping ===
Arnór was described as a key player for Norrköping in the 2018 Allsvenskan season, where he played as an attacking midfielder.

=== CSKA Moscow ===
On 31 August 2018, Arnór signed a five-year contract with the Russian Premier League club CSKA Moscow. The transfer fee was reportedly set at around 40 million Swedish kronor (approximately €4 million), a club record fee received by Norrköping. He made his debut for CSKA on 19 September 2018 in a game against Viktoria Plzeň, and became the youngest Icelandic player ever to appear in a UEFA Champions League game.

Arnór scored his first goal for CSKA on 7 November 2018 in a Champions League game against Roma. Four days later, he scored his first Russian Premier League goal in a 2–0 victory over Zenit Saint Petersburg. On 12 December 2018, Arnór scored a goal in a 3–0 win over Real Madrid in the Santiago Bernabéu. On 6 April 2019, he scored twice in a 2–0 derby victory over Spartak Moscow.

==== Loan to Venezia ====
On 30 July 2021, he joined Italian Serie A club Venezia on loan for the 2021–22 season. Before going on loan, he extended his contract with CSKA until 2024.

==== Return to Norrköping ====
On 3 July 2022, Arnór suspended his contract with CSKA Moscow for the 2022–23 season, having taken advantage of the FIFA ruling relating to the Russian invasion of Ukraine. On 14 July 2022, he returned to Norrköping until June 2023 under these regulations.

=== Blackburn Rovers ===
On 21 June 2023, Arnór again exercised his right to move clubs and joined Blackburn Rovers for the 2023–24 season. On 26 December 2023, the transfer was made permanent, and Arnór signed a contract with Blackburn until June 2025.On 17 February 2025 the contract was cancelled by mutual agreement.

=== Malmö FF ===
On 18 February 2025, Arnór signed for Swedish club Malmö FF. On 7 April 2025, Arnór scored his first goal for Malmö in the 78th minute in a 2–1 win over IF Elfsborg.

== International career ==
Arnór made his senior debut for Iceland on 15 November 2018 in a 2018–19 UEFA Nations League A game against Belgium, as a starter.

== Career statistics ==
=== Club ===
As of match played 24 April 2026

Appearances and goals by club, season and competition
Club	Season	League			National Cup		Continental		Other		Total	
Club	Season	Division	Apps	Goals	Apps	Goals	Apps	Goals	Apps	Goals	Apps	Goals
ÍA	2015	Úrvalsdeild karla	1	0	0	0	0	0	–		1	0
ÍA	2016	Úrvalsdeild karla	6	0	2	0	0	0	–		8	0
ÍA	Total		7	0	2	0	0	0	0	0	9	0
Norrköping	2017	Allsvenskan	8	0	1	0	0	0	–		9	0
Norrköping	2018	Allsvenskan	17	3	0	0	–		–		17	3
Norrköping	Total		25	3	1	0	0	0	0	0	26	3
Sylvia (loan)	2017	Swedish Football Division 2	3	3	0	0	–		–		3	3
CSKA Moscow	2018–19	Russian Premier League	21	5	0	0	6	2	–		27	7
CSKA Moscow	2019-20	Russian Premier League	22	4	2	0	5	0	–		29	4
CSKA Moscow	2020–21	Russian Premier League	23	2	3	0	5	0	–		31	2
CSKA Moscow	2021–22	Russian Premier League	0	0	0	0	–		–		0	0
CSKA Moscow	2022–23	Russian Premier League	0	0	0	0	–		–		0	0
CSKA Moscow	Total		66	11	5	0	16	2	0	0	87	13
Venezia (loan)	2021–22	Serie A	9	0	2	0	–		–		11	0
Norrköping (loan)	2022	Allsvenskan	11	6	1	1	–		–		12	7
Norrköping (loan)	2023	Allsvenskan	10	5	4	3	–		–		14	8
Norrköping (loan)	Total		21	11	5	4	0	0	0	0	26	15
Blackburn Rovers (loan)	2023–24	Championship	29	5	3	1	–		2 (Note: Appearances in EFL Cup)	1	34	7
Blackburn Rovers (loan)	2024–25	Championship	5	1	0	0	–		2	0	7	1
Blackburn Rovers (loan)	Total		34	6	3	1	–		4	1	41	8
Malmö	2025	Allsvenskan	13	1	1	0	4 (Note: Three appearances in UEFA Champions League, one appearance in UEFA Europa League)	0	—		18	1
Malmö	2026	Allsvenskan	4	0	4	1	1 (Note: Appearance in UEFA Europa League)	0	—		9	1
Malmö	Total		17	1	5	1	5	0	—		27	2
Career total			183	34	23	6	21	2	4	1	230	44

=== International ===
As of match played 13 November 2026

Appearances and goals by national team and year
National team	Year	Apps	Goals
Iceland	2018	2	0
Iceland	2019	6	1
Iceland	2020	3	0
Iceland	2021	5	0
Iceland	2022	9	1
Iceland	2023	5	0
Iceland	2024	4	0
Iceland	2025	0	0
Iceland	2026	6	0
Total		40	2

As of 2 June 2022

Scores and results list Iceland's goal tally first, score column indicates score after each Arnór goal.

List of international goals scored by Arnór Sigurðsson
No.	Date	Venue	Opponent	Score	Result	Competition
1	14 October 2019	Laugardalsvöllur, Reykjavík, Iceland	Andorra	1–0	2–0	UEFA Euro 2020 qualification
2	2 June 2022	Sammy Ofer Stadium, Haifa, Israel	Israel	2–1	2–2	2022–23 UEFA Nations League B
