= Ishaq Abdulrazak =

Nigerian footballer (born 2002)

Personal information
- Date of birth: 5 May 2002 (age 24)
- Place of birth: Kaduna, Nigeria
- Height: 1.75 m (5 ft 9 in)
- Position: Midfielder

Team information
- Current team: IFK Värnamo
- Number: 21

Youth career
- –2020: Unity Academy

Senior career*
Years	Team	Apps	(Gls)
2020–2022	IFK Norrköping	55	(2)
2022–2025	Anderlecht	3	(0)
2022–2025	RSCA Futures	18	(2)
2023–2024	→ BK Häcken (loan)	9	(0)
2024	→ Odd (loan)	3	(0)
2025–	IFK Värnamo	17	(0)
- * Club domestic league appearances and goals as of 22 July 2026

Ishaq Abdulrazak (born 5 May 2002) is a Nigerian professional footballer who plays as a midfielder for Swedish club IFK Värnamo.

== Club career ==
On 20 June 2022, Abdulrazak left IFK Norrköping to join Belgian First Division A side Anderlecht on a four-year deal.

On 5 August 2023, Abdulrazak joined BK Häcken back in Sweden for a year-long loan.

On 2 September 2024, he moved on a new loan to Odd in Norway until the end of 2024.

On 27 January 2025, Abdulrazak returned to Sweden and signed a contract with IFK Värnamo until the end of 2027.

== Career statistics ==
=== Club ===
As of 20 June 2022

Club	Season	League			Cup		Continental		Other		Total	
Club	Season	Division	Apps	Goals	Apps	Goals	Apps	Goals	Apps	Goals	Apps	Goals
IFK Norrköping	2020	Allsvenskan	15	2	1	0	–		0	0	16	2
IFK Norrköping	2021	Allsvenskan	30	0	4	0	–		0	0	34	0
IFK Norrköping	2022	Allsvenskan	10	0	4	0	–		0	0	14	0
IFK Norrköping	Total		55	2	9	0	0	0	0	0	64	2
Anderlecht	2022-23	Belgian First Division A	0	0	0	0	0	0	0	0	0	0
Career total			55	2	9	0	0	0	0	0	64	2
