= Freddy Winsth =

Swedish footballer

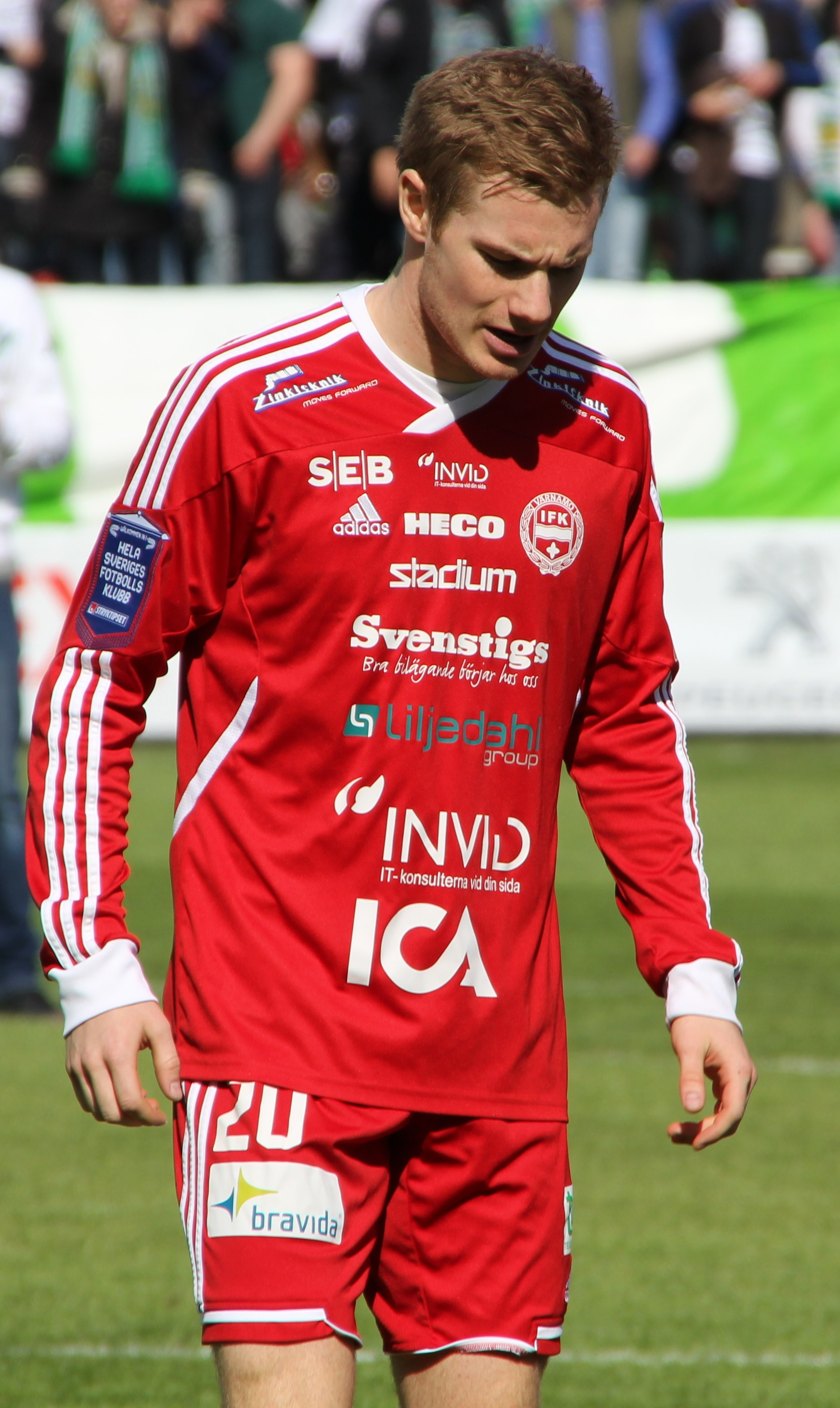

Personal information
- Full name: Freddy Roland Winsth
- Date of birth: 5 July 1990 (age 36)
- Place of birth: Värnamo, Sweden
- Height: 1.76 m (5 ft 9 in)
- Position: Defender

Youth career
- –2008: IFK Värnamo

Senior career*
| Years | Team | Apps | (Gls) |
| 2008–2025 | IFK Värnamo | 378 | (16) |
| Total | | 378 | (16) |
- * Club domestic league appearances and goals

Freddy Roland Winsth (born 15 July 1990) is a Swedish former professional footballer who played as a defender. He is a one-club man, spending his whole career at IFK Värnamo.

== Career ==
Winsth started his career with Swedish side IFK Värnamo, captaining the club and helping them achieve promotion to the Swedish top flight.
