= Isse Ismail =

Somali footballer

Personal information
- Full name: Isse Ahmed Ismail
- Date of birth: 8 March 1999 (age 27)
- Place of birth: Växjö, Sweden
- Position: Midfielder

Team information
- Current team: IFK Stocksund

Senior career*
Years	Team	Apps	(Gls)
2017	IFK Osby	15	(3)
2018–2021	IFK Värnamo	29	(2)
2022	IFK Haninge	8	(0)
2023–	IFK Stocksund	6	(0)

International career^{‡}
2021–	Somalia	2	(0)
- * Club domestic league appearances and goals as of 7 June 2023 ‡ National team caps and goals as of 28 June 2021

Isse Ahmed Ismail (Somali: Ciise Axmed Ismaaciil; born 8 March 1999) is a footballer who plays as a midfielder for IFK Stocksund. Born in Sweden, he represents the Somalia national team.

== Club career ==
In 2017, Ismail began his career at IFK Osby, before signing for Superettan club IFK Värnamo in 2018.

== International career ==
On 15 June 2021, Ismail made his debut for Somalia, in a 1–0 friendly loss against Djibouti.
