= Kadir Hodžić =

Bosnian footballer (born 1994)

Personal information
- Date of birth: 5 August 1994 (age 32)
- Place of birth: Srebrenica, Bosnia and Herzegovina
- Height: 1.79 m (5 ft 10 in)
- Position: Left-back

Youth career
- Skene IF
- 2012–2013: IF Elfsborg

Senior career*
Years	Team	Apps	(Gls)
2010	Skene IF	7	(0)
2011	Kinna IF	21	(0)
2014	Kinna IF	20	(4)
2015	Motala AIF	7	(0)
2016–2017	Norrby IF	63	(0)
2018–2019	AFC Eskilstuna	56	(5)
2020	Dalkurd FF	14	(0)
2020–2022	Mjällby AIF	40	(3)
2022–2024	BK Häcken	13	(0)
- * Club domestic league appearances and goals as of 15 November 2023

Kadir Hodžić (born 5 August 1994) is a Bosnia-born Swedish footballer.

== Career ==
=== Club career ===
Hodžić started his career with Skene IF. After a year with Kinna IF, it was confirmed in November 2011, that 17-year old Hodžić had joined IF Elfsborg's U21 team, where he signed a two-year contract. In the 2014 season, Hodzic returned to Kinna IF, where he played 20 games and scored four goals in Division 3.

On 16 March 2020, Dalkurd FF confirmed the signing of Hodžić.

On 19 February 2022, Hodžić signed a three-year contract with BK Häcken. He left Häcken by mutual consent on 28 March 2024.

== Honours ==
BK Häcken

- Allsvenskan: 2022
