= Jacob Ortmark =

Swedish footballer

Personal information
- Full name: Jacob Åke Stefan Ortmark
- Date of birth: 29 August 1997 (age 29)
- Place of birth: Sweden
- Height: 1.74 m (5 ft 9 in)
- Position: Midfielder

Team information
- Current team: Örebro
- Number: 5

Youth career
- Stocksunds IF
- IF Brommapojkarna

Senior career*
Years	Team	Apps	(Gls)
2014–2018	IF Brommapojkarna	62	(10)
2018	→ Gefle IF (loan)	13	(2)
2019–2020	Degerfors IF	55	(3)
2021	IK Sirius	28	(4)
2022–2025	IFK Norrköping	49	(6)
2025	Hammarby IF	9	(0)
2026–	Örebro	29	(2)

International career
2014	Sweden U17	2	(0)
2014–2015	Sweden U19	5	(0)
- * Club domestic league appearances and goals as of 12 November 2026

Jacob Åke Stefan Ortmark (born 29 August 1997) is a Swedish professional footballer who plays as a midfielder for Örebro.

== Career ==
=== IF Brommapojkarna ===
On 9 January 2019 IF Brommapojkarna announced, that Ortmark had left the club.

=== Degerfors IF ===
After breaking with IF Brommapojkarna, Ortmark joined Degerfors IF on 19 February 2019.

=== IK Sirius ===
Before the 2021 Allsvenskan season, Ortmark was signed by IK Sirius on a three-year contract.

=== IFK Norrköping ===
After only a year in Uppsala, Ortmark signed a four-year contract with IFK Norrköping as a replacement for Alexander Fransson.

=== Örebro SK ===
Ahead of the 2026-season, Ortmark joined Superettan side Örebro SK on a one-year contract with an option to extend it.
