= Even Hovland =

Norwegian footballer (born 1989)

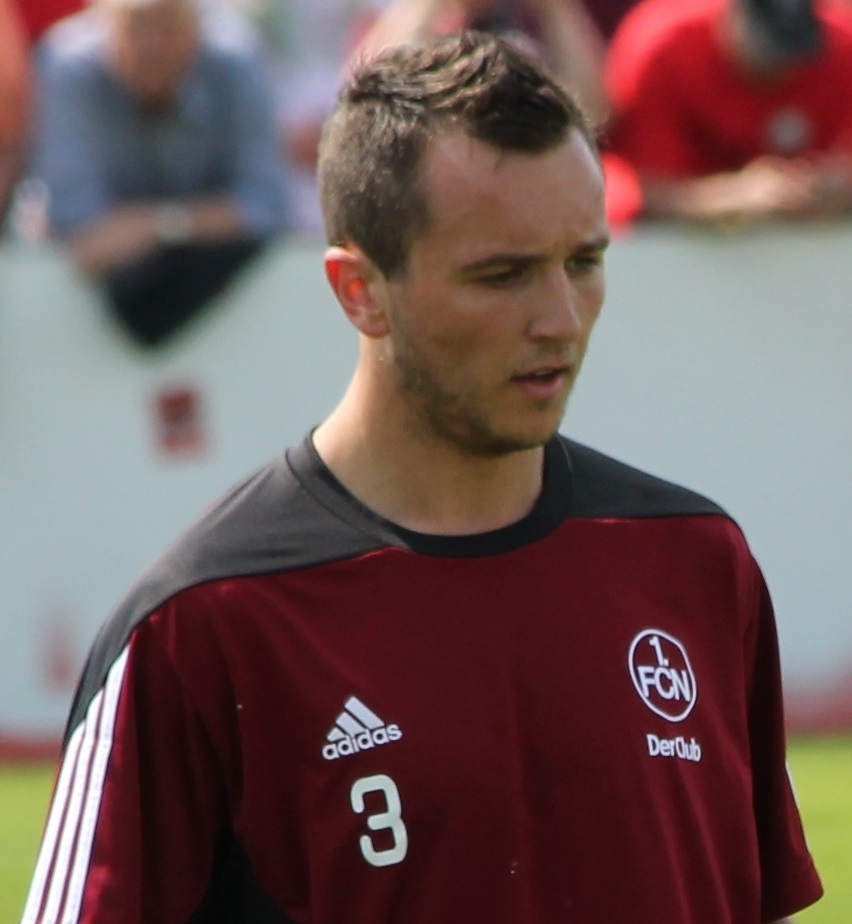
- Hovland in 2014

Personal information
- Date of birth: 14 February 1989 (age 37)
- Place of birth: Vadheim, Norway
- Height: 1.90 m (6 ft 3 in)
- Position: Centre-back

Team information
- Current team: Sogndal
- Number: 4

Youth career
- Vadheim
- Høyang

Senior career*
Years	Team	Apps	(Gls)
2007–2011	Sogndal	93	(10)
2012–2014	Molde	51	(3)
2014–2017	1. FC Nürnberg	71	(4)
2017–2018	Sogndal	10	(0)
2018–2021	Rosenborg	102	(9)
2022–2024	BK Häcken	83	(11)
2025	Brommapojkarna	30	(0)
2026–	Sogndal	29	(6)

International career^{‡}
2009–2010	Norway U21	6	(0)
2012–2020	Norway	29	(0)
- * Club domestic league appearances and goals as of 14 November 2026 ‡ National team caps and goals as of 7 September 2020

Even Hovland (born 14 February 1989) is a Norwegian professional footballer who plays as a centre back for Norwegian side Sogndal.

== Club career ==
In his youth, Hovland played for the local clubs Vadheim IL and IL Høyang, before joining Sogndal in 2007.

During the warm-up to the opening match of the 2009 season against Hønefoss, Hovland broke his foot, and missed almost the entire season.

In 2009–2010, Hovland was on trial at Manchester United, but was not offered a contract.

Hovland joined Molde FK ahead of the 2012-season.

In the 2012–13 UEFA Champions League qualifying match against FC Basel, Hovland was injured and had to leave the pitch after 25 minutes. The knee-injury kept him out of play for the rest of the 2012-season.

On 14 June 2014, Molde announced that Hovland had signed a three-year deal with German club 1. FC Nürnberg.

On 11 September 2017, Sogndal announced that Hovland had returned to the club after having been released from Nürnberg. He had signed a deal keeping him at Sogndal until 2020.

On 4 April 2018, Rosenborg announced that Hovland had signed a 3 1/2-year contract with the club.

On 28 December 2021, Hovland signe a two-year contract with Häcken. He established himself as a consistent performer, and by the end of the season, he had played for BK Häcken 33 times in all competitions, scoring six goals, helping them to their first ever Allsvenskan title. He was voted Allsvenskan Defender of the Season at the end of the season.

== International career ==
Hovland was named in Norway's squad for the EURO 2012 qualification match against Cyprus on 11 October 2011, because Brede Hangeland was suspended due to yellow cards. Hovland made his debut for the senior team in a 1–1 friendly draw against Denmark on 15 January 2012. The day before Norway's friendly against Northern Ireland on 29 February 2012, Hovland was again called up for Norway as a replacement for Brede Hangeland, but because Hovland had played a pre-season match with Molde in Spain the same day he withdrew from the national team squad.

== Personal life ==
Hovland's sister Stine is also an international footballer. The siblings were teammates in their local youth team.

Hovland's cousin Viktor is an international professional golfer.

== Career statistics ==
As of match played 7 July 2026

Appearances and goals by club, season and competition
Club	Season	Division	League		Cup		Europe		Total	
Club	Season	Division	Apps	Goals	Apps	Goals	Apps	Goals	Apps	Goals
Sogndal	2007	Adeccoligaen	28	1	0	0	–		28	1
Sogndal	2008	Adeccoligaen	17	1	1	0	–		18	1
Sogndal	2009	Adeccoligaen	2	0	0	0	–		2	0
Sogndal	2010	Adeccoligaen	24	6	4	1	–		28	7
Sogndal	2011	Tippeligaen	22	2	4	1	–		26	3
Sogndal	Total		93	10	9	2	–		102	12
Molde	2012	Tippeligaen	18	1	3	1	4	0	25	1
Molde	2013	Tippeligaen	24	1	5	1	5	0	34	2
Molde	2014	Tippeligaen	9	1	1	0	0	0	10	1
Molde	Total		51	3	9	2	9	0	69	4
1. FC Nürnberg	2014–15	2. Bundesliga	25	1	0	0	–		25	1
1. FC Nürnberg	2015–16	2. Bundesliga	26	2	2	0	–		28	2
1. FC Nürnberg	2016–17	2. Bundesliga	20	1	1	0	–		21	1
1. FC Nürnberg	Total		71	4	3	0	–		74	4
Sogndal	2017	Eliteserien	9	0	0	0	–		9	0
Sogndal	2018	OBOS-ligaen	1	0	0	0	–		1	0
Sogndal	Total		10	0	0	0	–		10	0
Rosenborg	2018	Eliteserien	27	0	4	0	13	1	44	1
Rosenborg	2019	Eliteserien	28	5	3	1	14	0	45	6
Rosenborg	2020	Eliteserien	18	2	0	0	2	1	20	3
Rosenborg	2021	Eliteserien	20	2	3	1	6	0	38	3
Rosenborg	Total		102	9	10	2	35	2	147	13
Häcken	2022	Allsvenskan	30	4	4	2	0	0	34	6
Häcken	2023	Allsvenskan	27	6	6	1	13	1	46	8
Häcken	2024	Allsvenskan	26	1	3	0	0	0	29	1
Häcken	Total		83	11	13	3	13	1	109	15
Brommapojkarna	2025	Allsvenskan	30	0	3	0	0	0	34	0
Brommapojkarna	Total		30	0	3	0	0	0	33	0
Sogndal	2026	OBOS-ligaen	13	1	0	0	–		13	1
Sogndal	Total		13	1	0	0	0	0	13	1
Career total			453	39	47	9	57	3	557	51

== Honours ==
Molde

- Tippeligaen: 2012, 2014
- Norwegian Cup: 2013, 2014

Rosenborg

- Eliteserien: 2018
- Norwegian Cup: 2018

BK Häcken

- Allsvenskan: 2022
- Svenska Cupen: 2022–23

Individual

- Tippeligaen Defender of the Year: 2011
- Allsvenskan Defender of the Year: 2022
