= Dino Salihovic =

Swedish footballer (born 2002)

Personal information
- Date of birth: 2 December 2002 (age 23)
- Height: 1.74 m (5 ft 9 in)
- Positions: Right back; midfielder

Team information
- Current team: Örebro SK
- Number: 12

Youth career
- 2009–2020: IFK Norrköping

Senior career*
Years	Team	Apps	(Gls)
2019	→ IF Sylvia (loan)	6	(0)
2021–2024	IFK Norrköping	41	(0)
2021	→ IF Sylvia (loan)	7	(0)
2022	→ IF Sylvia (loan)	11	(1)
2023	→ GAIS (loan)	27	(0)
2025	Valencia Mestalla	5	(0)
2025–	Örebro SK	22	(1)

International career^{‡}
2019	Sweden U17	2	(0)
- * Club domestic league appearances and goals as of 12 November 2026 ‡ National team caps and goals as of 7 December 2025

Dino Salihovic (born 2 December 2002) is a Swedish footballer who plays as a right back for Örebro SK.

He is of Bosnian descent.. Starting his youth career in IFK Norrköping, his first senior experience came for Norrköping's cooperation club IF Sylvia in 2019. In the same year, he played two of the three matches in a four-nation tournament for Sweden U17.

After sitting on the bench for Norrköping at the end of 2020, he made his Norrköping debut in the 2020–21 Svenska Cupen in February 2021. Salihovic was officially added to the senior squad in 2021. Further loans to Sylvia followed.

In 2023, he was loaned out to GAIS and helped them win promotion from the 2023 Superettan to Allsvenskan. In 2024 he was finally a regular player for Norrköping, but stated that he "had not heard much" regarding a renewal of his contract which expired at the end of 2024. In late December, he still had not heard anything, and the manager was also fired.

It was regarded as a surprise when he signed for Valencia on a free transfer, but it turned out to be Valencia's B team in the Segunda Federación. It was a short-term contract with the club having the option to prolong if desirable. With Salihovic having played 5 matches, the Spanish club did not exercise the option, thus Salihovic returned to Sweden, signing for struggling Superettan team Örebro SK. His goal was to take the team out of the second tier.
