= Viktor Agardius =

Swedish footballer (born 1989)

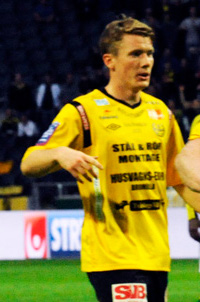

Personal information
- Full name: Lars Viktor Filip Agardius
- Date of birth: 23 October 1989 (age 37)
- Place of birth: Skepparslöv, Sweden
- Height: 1.81 m (5 ft 11 1/2 in)
- Positions: Left-back; centre-back

Team information
- Current team: Kristianstad FC
- Number: 5

Youth career
- Kristianstads FF

Senior career*
Years	Team	Apps	(Gls)
2007–2011	Kristianstads FF	95	(3)
2012–2014	Mjällby AIF	77	(1)
2015–2019	Kalmar FF	102	(1)
2020	Livorno	1	(0)
2020	Mjällby AIF	26	(0)
2021–2022	IFK Norrköping	37	(2)
2023	Brommapojkarna	2	(0)
2024–2025	NSÍ Runavík	11	(1)
2025–	Kristianstad FC	47	(0)
- * Club domestic league appearances and goals as of 16 November 2026

Viktor Agardius (born 23 October 1989) is a Swedish footballer who plays as a left-back or centre-back´for Kristianstad FC.

== Club career ==
On 4 February 2020, he joined Italian Serie B club Livorno.

On 29 May 2020, he returned to Mjällby AIF.

On 9 February 2021 he signed a two-year contract with IFK Norrköping.
