= Ludvig Carlius =

Swedish footballer

Personal information
- Date of birth: 14 March 2001 (age 25)
- Place of birth: Sweden
- Height: 1.80 m (5 ft 11 in)
- Position: Midfielder

Team information
- Current team: Rosengård 1917
- Number: 14

Youth career
- Helsingborgs IF

Senior career*
Years	Team	Apps	(Gls)
2020	Helsingborgs IF	4	(0)
2021–2023	Mjällby AIF	6	(0)
2021	→ IFK Malmö (loan)	6	(1)
2023	→ Ängelholms FF (loan)	6	(1)
2024	Helsingør	13	(0)
2024–2025	Ängelholms FF	24	(3)
2026–	Rosengård 1917	21	(4)
- * Club domestic league appearances and goals as of 16 November 2026

Ludvig Carlius (born 14 March 2001) is a Swedish football midfielder who plays for Rosengård 1917.
