= Villiam Dahlström =

Swedish footballer

Personal information
- Date of birth: 30 June 1997 (age 29)
- Height: 1.86 m (6 ft 1 in)
- Position: Forward

Team information
- Current team: FC Stockholm Internazionale
- Number: 19

Youth career
- Roma IF

Senior career*
Years	Team	Apps	(Gls)
2014–2019	FC Gute	135	(77)
2020–2021	Degerfors IF	51	(12)
2022–2024	Halmstad	30	(2)
2023	→ Örgryte (loan)	5	(1)
2024–	FC Stockholm Internazionale	44	(10)
- * Club domestic league appearances and goals as of 24 November 2025

Villiam Dahlström (born 30 June 1997) is a Swedish footballer who plays as a striker for Ettan-Norra club FC Stockholm.

== Club career ==
On 30 December 2021, Dahlström signed a three-year contract with Halmstad.

On 13 July 2024, Dahlström signed a contract with FC Stockholm Internazionale.
