= Theodore Rask =

Swedish footballer

Personal information
- Date of birth: 1 May 2000 (age 26)
- Height: 1.89 m (6 ft 2 in)
- Position: Centre-back

Team information
- Current team: retired

Youth career
- Motala

Senior career*
| Years | Team | Apps | (Gls) |
| 2018–2019 | IF Sylvia | 53 | (2) |
| 2019–2023 | IFK Norrköping | 11 | (0) |
| 2020 | → IF Sylvia (loan) | 9 | (1) |
| 2021 | → IF Sylvia (loan) | 7 | (0) |
| 2022 | → Västerås SK (loan) | 21 | (0) |
| 2023 | → Östersunds FK (loan) | 26 | (0) |

International career
| 2021 | Sweden U-19 | 2 | (0) |
- * Club domestic league appearances and goals as of 17 November 2023

Theodore Rask (born 1 May 2000) was a Swedish football defender who played for IF Sylvia, Västerås SK, Östersunds FK and IFK Norrköping.
