= Oliver Stanisic =

Swedish footballer (born 1994)

Personal information
- Date of birth: 10 February 1994 (age 32)
- Place of birth: Sweden
- Height: 1.92 m (6 ft 4 in)
- Position: Centre-back

Youth career
- 1999–2013: BK Häcken

Senior career*
| Years | Team | Apps | (Gls) |
| 2014 | Torslanda IK | 18 | (1) |
| 2015–2016 | Qviding FIF | 43 | (0) |
| 2017–2018 | Varbergs BoIS | 44 | (2) |
| 2019–2020 | Örgryte IS | 42 | (1) |
| 2021–2023 | Varbergs BoIS | 59 | (7) |
| 2023–2025 | Horsens | 19 | (0) |
| Total | | 225 | (11) |
- * Club domestic league appearances and goals

Oliver Stanisic (born 10 February 1994) is a Swedish former footballer who played as a defender. He announced his retirement at the age of 31 in September 2025.
