= Laorent Shabani =

Swedish footballer

Personal information
- Date of birth: 19 August 1999 (age 27)
- Height: 1.75 m (5 ft 9 in)
- Position: Winger

Team information
- Current team: Varbergs BoIS
- Number: 9

Youth career
- Malmö FF

Senior career*
| Years | Team | Apps | (Gls) |
| 2018–2019 | Malmö FF | 0 | (0) |
| 2020–2022 | Sirius | 65 | (2) |
| 2022–2025 | IFK Norrköping | 48 | (4) |
| 2023–2024 | → Andorra (loan) | 2 | (0) |
| 2025 | → Varbergs BoIS (loan) | 28 | (8) |
| 2026 | Partizani | 10 | (0) |
| 2026 | Ballkani | 0 | (0) |
| 2026– | Varbergs BoIS | 8 | (0) |

International career
| 2015 | Sweden U17 | 2 | (0) |
| 2017–2018 | Sweden U19 | 4 | (0) |
- * Club domestic league appearances and goals as of 11 November 2026

Laorent Shabani (born 19 August 1999) is a Swedish professional footballer who plays as a winger for Varbergs BoIS.

== Club career ==
Shabani began his career with Malmö FF, moving to IK Sirius for the 2020 season, where he made his professional debut. In 2022, he joined IFK Norrköping.

On 31 August 2023, Shabani moved to Segunda División side FC Andorra on loan. The following 8 January, after featuring rarely, his loan was terminated.

On 20 March 2025, Shabani moved to Superettan side Varbergs BoIS on loan, with an expected return date of 30 November 2025.

== International career ==
He has played for Sweden at under-17 and under-19 youth levels.

== Personal life ==
Born in Sweden, he is of Albanian descent.
