= Jon Birkfeldt =

Swedish footballer

Personal information
- Date of birth: 3 June 1996 (age 30)
- Place of birth: Helsingborg, Sweden
- Height: 1.83 m (6 ft 0 in)
- Position: Defender

Team information
- Current team: Helsingborgs IF
- Number: 2

Youth career
- Eskilsminne IF
- –2015: Helsingborgs IF

Senior career*
Years	Team	Apps	(Gls)
2016–2017	Åtvidabergs FF	35	(1)
2018	IFK Värnamo	25	(1)
2019	IK Frej	20	(0)
2020–2023	Varbergs BoIS	64	(4)
2023–	Helsingborgs IF	51	(2)
- * Club domestic league appearances and goals as of 13 November 2025

Jon Birkfeldt (born 3 June 1996) is a Swedish footballer who plays for Helsingborgs IF.
