= Jean (footballer, born June 1995) =

Brazilian footballer

Personal information
- Full name: Jean Carlos de Brito
- Date of birth: 9 June 1995 (age 31)
- Place of birth: Goiânia, Brazil
- Height: 1.73 m (5 ft 8 in)
- Position: Left midfielder

Youth career
- Goiás
- Osasuna
- Palmeiras
- Formosa

Senior career*
Years	Team	Apps	(Gls)
2017	CRAC	8	(1)
2017	Paysandu	4	(0)
2018–2019	Tubarão	24	(0)
2018	→ Sport Recife (loan)	0	(0)
2019–2021	Hammarby IF	5	(0)
2019	→ IK Frej (loan)	9	(0)
2020	→ TPS (loan)	10	(1)
2021	Varbergs BoIS	23	(0)
2022–2023	IFK Norrköping	8	(0)
2023	→ Horsens (loan)	1	(0)
- * Club domestic league appearances and goals as of 12 November 2023

Jean Carlos de Brito (born 9 June 1995), commonly known as Jean (Brazilian Portuguese: [ʒeˈan, ʒan, ʒeˈɐ̃w, ʒɐ̃w]), is a Brazilian footballer who plays as a left midfielder. A versatile player, he is also able to play as a central midfielder and as a left winger.

== Career ==
=== Youth years ===
Born in Goiânia, Brazil, Jean first started to play youth football with local club Goiás. He also went on to represent Spanish club Osasuna, Palmeiras and Formosa during his youth years.

=== Brazil ===
Jean emerged into playing regular first team football in 2017, spending part of the year at CRAC and Paysandu. He featured in the 2017 Copa Verde campaign, where Paysandu finished runners-up following a 4–2 aggregated defeat against Luverdense Esporte Clube in the finals.

He signed with Clube Atlético Tubarão on 10 January 2018, and went on to make a total of 24 appearances for the club in the Série D and the Campeonato Catarinense. Jean also spent three months on loan with the Sport Recife in 2018, failing to make any competitive appearances for the Série A club.

=== Hammarby IF ===
On 3 February 2019, Jean transferred to Hammarby IF in Allsvenskan. He signed a three-year deal with the Swedish club for an undisclosed fee. He was sought out as a replacement for countryman Neto Borges, who also had been bought from Tubarão the previous season. However, he had difficulties breaking into the starting eleven and only made 3 appearances for Hammarby during the first half of the season. On 2 August, Jean was loaned out to affiliated club IK Frej in Superettan, Sweden's second division, for the remainder of the year.

=== Varbergs BoIS ===
On 26 February 2021, Jean moved to fellow Swedish club Varbergs BoIS, on a three-year contract.

=== IFK Norrköping ===
After only a season in Varberg, it was announced by IFK Norrköping in January 2022 that they had signed Jean at a three-year contract.

On 21 July 2023, Jean joined Danish 1st Division side AC Horsens on a one-year loan deal with a purchase option. In his debut match against AaB on July 29, 2023, Jean suffered a serious knee injury, which later turned out to be an ACL injury for the second time in his career. At the end of September 2023, Horsens confirmed that they had terminated the agreement between the parties so that he could return home to Norrköping and start his rehabilitation.
