= Tobias Carlsson (footballer, born 1995) =

Swedish footballer

Personal information
- Full name: Jens Tobias Carlsson
- Date of birth: 18 July 1995 (age 31)
- Height: 1.87 m (6 ft 2 in)
- Position: Defender

Team information
- Current team: FH
- Number: 4

Youth career
- Grebbestads IF

Senior career*
Years	Team	Apps	(Gls)
2017–2018	Grebbestads IF	52	(2)
2019	Varbergs BoIS	25	(0)
2020–2023	BK Häcken	22	(0)
2022	→ Varbergs BoIS (loan)	14	(1)
2023–2025	IK Sirius	23	(1)
2026–	FH	6	(0)
- * Club domestic league appearances and goals as of 10 July 2026

Tobias Carlsson (born 28 July 1995) is a Swedish footballer who plays as a defender for Icelandic club FH.

== Career ==
=== Grebbestads IF ===
Carlsson's parent club is Grebbestads IF. He played 143 league games and scored four goals for the A team between 2013 and 2018.

=== Varbergs BoIS ===
In December 2018, Carlsson was signed by Varbergs BoIS, where he signed a two-year contract. Carlsson made his Superettan debut on 7 April 2019 in a 3-1 win over Trelleborgs FF.

=== BK Häcken ===
On 2 December 2019 Carlsson was signed by BK Häcken, where he signed a three-year contract. On 31 August 2021 Carlsson extended his contract at the club until the 2025 season.

=== IK Sirius ===
On 16 August 2023 Carlsson was signed by IK Sirius.
