= List of Swedish football transfers winter 2025–26 =

This is a list of Swedish football transfers for the 2025–26 winter transfer window. Only transfers featuring Allsvenskan and Superettan are listed.

== Allsvenskan ==
Note: Flags indicate national team as has been defined under FIFA eligibility rules. Players may hold more than one non-FIFA nationality.

=== Mjällby ===
In:

No.	Pos.	Nation	Player
1	GK	SWE	Amar Dževlan (from Hammarby TFF)
13	GK	SWE	Robin Wallinder (from Öster)
14	MF	SWE	Villiam Granath (from Halmstad)
21	FW	NGA	Ibrahim Adewale (from (Nigeria) Tripple 44, previously on loan at Karlstad)
23	FW	FRO	Áki Samuelsen (from (Norway) Ranheim)
25	DF	DEN	Max Nielsen (from (Denmark) Hobro)
31	FW	SWE	Zebedee Kennedy (from Sundsvall youth)

Out:

No.	Pos.	Nation	Player
1	GK	SWE	Noel Törnqvist (loan return to (Italy) Como)
14	DF	SWE	Herman Johansson (to (United States) FC Dallas)
16	FW	SWE	Alexander Johansson (to (Greece) Marko)
21	MF	SWE	Adam Petersson (free agent)
26	DF	NGA	Uba Charles (loan return to (Norway) Lillestrøm)
28	DF	SWE	Tim Malmström (free agent)
—	MF	SWE	Kimmen Nennesson (on loan to Enköping)
—	MF	SWE	Filip Åkesson Linderoth (reloan to Sölvesborg)
—	DF	SWE	Liam Svensson (on loan to Skövde, previously on loan at Ängelholm)
—	MF	SWE	Manasse Kusu (on loan to Örebro, previously on loan at (Finland) Jaro)
—	FW	SWE	Isac Johnsson (on loan to Sölvesborg, previously on loan at Kristianstad)
—	DF	SWE	Johan Åhstedt (to Hässleholm, previously on loan)
—	DF	KOS	Argjend Miftari (to Falkenberg, previously on loan at Karlstad)
—	FW	NGA	Yusuf Abdulazeez (to Norrby, previously on loan)
—	FW	SWE	Love Björnson (to Hässleholm, previously on loan at Lund)
—	FW	UGA	Calvin Kabuye (to (Finland) KuPS, previously on loan at Varberg)

=== Hammarby ===
In:

No.	Pos.	Nation	Player
9	FW	DEN	Victor Lind (from Brommapojkarna)
15	FW	NOR	Oliver Jordan Hagen (from (Norway) Odd)
21	MF	CIV	Sourou Koné (from (Ivory Coast) ASEC Mimosas)
—	FW	GAM	Suwaibou Kebbeh (from (The Gambia) Real de Banjul, previously on loan at Hammarby TFF)
—	FW	LBR	William Gibson (from (Liberia) Heaven Eleven)

Out:

No.	Pos.	Nation	Player
6	DF	SWE	Pavle Vagić (to (China) Liaoning Tieren)
15	MF	SWE	Adrian Lahdo (to (Italy) Como)
17	FW	NOR	Obilor Okeke (to Brommapojkarna)
21	DF	SWE	Simon Strand (to Brommapojkarna)
22	MF	SWE	Jacob Ortmark (to Örebro)
—	DF	SWE	Jonathan Karlsson (reloan to Västerås)
—	FW	GAM	Suwaibou Kebbeh (on loan to Sundsvall)
—	FW	LBR	William Gibson (on loan to Hammarby TFF)
—	FW	NGA	Samuel Adindu (to Sirius, previously on loan at Hammarby TFF)
—	FW	SWE	Milian Öberg (to Rosengård, previously on loan at Hammarby TFF)

=== GAIS ===
In:

No.	Pos.	Nation	Player
10	MF	SWE	Henry Sletsjøe (from (Norway) Rosenborg, previously on loan at (Norway) Kristiansund)
16	MF	SWE	Max Andersson (from Norrby)
20	FW	CAN	Samuel Salter (from (Canada) Atlético Ottawa)
26	FW	GHA	Blessing Asumang (from Örebro)
32	FW	SWE	Oscar Pettersson (from (Netherlands) Go Ahead Eagles)
33	GK	DEN	Andreas Hermansen (from (Denmark) Horsens, previously on loan at (Norway) Egersund)

Out:

No.	Pos.	Nation	Player
10	MF	SWE	Amin Boudri (to (United States) Los Angeles FC)
11	FW	SWE	Edvin Bećirović (to (Greece) Marko)
14	MF	SWE	Filip Gustafsson (on loan to Norrby)
19	FW	CIV	Ibrahim Diabate (on loan to (Spain) Deportivo Alavés)
27	FW	SWE	Anton Kurochkin (loan return to Brommapojkarna)
31	FW	SWE	Simon Sjöholm (on loan to Utsikten)
—	GK	SWE	Victor Astor (to Enköping, previously on loan at Trelleborg)
—	FW	SWE	Chisomnazu Chika Chidi (to (Italy) Gravina, previously on loan at Norrby)
—	FW	SMA	Chovanie Amatkarijo (to (Latvia) Liepāja, previously on loan at Östersund)

=== Göteborg ===
In:

No.	Pos.	Nation	Player
1	GK	NOR	Jonathan Rasheed (from (Iceland) KA)
12	GK	SWE	Viktor Andersson (on loan from Värnamo)
16	MF	SWE	Filip Ottosson (from (Norway) Sandefjord)
17	DF	SWE	Alexander Jallow (free agent)
20	DF	SWE	Gabriel Ersoy (from Vasalund)
29	FW	SWE	Adam Bergmark Wiberg (from (South Korea) Chungnam Asan)
30	FW	CAN	Tiago Coimbra (from (Canada) HFX Wanderers)
34	GK	SWE	Fredrik Andersson (from Varberg)

Out:

No.	Pos.	Nation	Player
1	GK	SWE	Pontus Dahlberg (to (Norway) Lillestrøm)
13	DF	SWE	Gustav Svensson (retired)
16	FW	SWE	Linus Carlstrand (to Öster)
24	MF	CIV	Abundance Salaou (to (Canada) Toronto FC II)
27	FW	SWE	Alfons Borén (on loan to Ljungskile)
29	DF	DEN	Thomas Santos (to (Poland) Motor Lublin)
—	DF	NOR	Anders Trondsen (to (Norway) HamKam, previously on loan at (Norway) Sarpsborg 08)
—	MF	SWE	Vilmer Tyrén (to Kalmar, previously on loan at Ljungskile)

=== Djurgården ===
In:

No.	Pos.	Nation	Player
3	DF	SWE	Leon Hien (from Degerfors)
6	MF	DEN	Peter Langhoff (from (Denmark) Lyngby)
9	FW	NOR	Kristian Lien (from (Netherlands) Groningen, previously on loan at (Norway) HamKam)
22	FW	SWE	Joel Asoro (on loan from (France) Metz)
24	DF	SWE	Max Larsson (from Västerås)

Out:

No.	Pos.	Nation	Player
3	DF	SWE	Marcus Danielson (free agent)
6	MF	FIN	Rasmus Schüller (to (Denmark) Vendsyssel)
8	MF	SWE	Albin Ekdal (retired)
9	FW	DEN	August Priske (to (England) Birmingham City)
10	FW	NOR	Tokmac Nguen (to (Saudi Arabia) Al-Okhdood)
11	FW	SWE	Zakaria Sawo (on loan to (Cyprus) AEL Limassol)
12	DF	SWE	Theo Bergvall (to (Switzerland) Lausanne-Sport)
27	DF	JPN	Keita Kosugi (to (Germany) Eintracht Frankfurt)
—	FW	SWE	Christopher Sliwo (on loan to Vasalund)
—	GK	SWE	Max Croon (on loan to Gefle, previously on loan at Östersund)
—	FW	SWE	Kalipha Jawla (on loan to Nordic United, previously on loan at Utsikten)
—	DF	KEN	Frank Odhiambo (to (Kenya) Gor Mahia, previously on loan at Karlstad)
—	MF	SWE	Gideon Granström (to Brage, previously on loan at Östersund)

=== Malmö ===
In:

No.	Pos.	Nation	Player
4	DF	SWE	Bleon Kurtulus (from Halmstad)
6	MF	BUL	Yanis Karabelyov (from (Serbia) Partizan)
23	DF	SWE	Noah Åstrand John (from Brage)
24	FW	SWE	Oscar Sjöstrand (from (Netherlands) Cambuur)
28	MF	SRB	Jovan Milosavljević (from (Serbia) Železničar Pančevo)
—	FW	MNE	Omar Krajina (from (Italy) Roma Primavera)

Out:

No.	Pos.	Nation	Player
6	MF	SWE	Oscar Lewicki (retired)
13	DF	SWE	Martin Olsson (free agent)
15	MF	GUI	Salifou Soumah (on loan to (Poland) Radomiak Radom)
16	MF	NOR	Oliver Berg (to Brommapojkarna)
23	MF	NOR	Lasse Berg Johnsen (to (United States) Sporting Kansas City)
33	GK	SWE	Melker Ellborg (to (England) Sunderland)
38	MF	SWE	Hugo Bolin (on loan to (Germany) Borussia Mönchengladbach)
50	GK	SWE	Joakim Persson (on loan to Olympic)
—	DF	GHA	Israel Anum (on loan to Olympic)
—	DF	NEP	Sashwat Rana (on loan to Olympic)
—	DF	SWE	William Åkesson (on loan to Landskrona)
—	MF	SWE	Viggo Karlsson (on loan to Trelleborg)
—	MF	KOS	Medjen Llumnica (on loan to Olympic)
—	FW	MNE	Omar Krajina (on loan to Olympic)
—	FW	GHA	Yassin Mohammed (on loan to Olympic)
—	MF	SWE	Zakaria Loukili (on loan to Landskrona, previously on loan at Varberg)
—	MF	FRA	Mahamé Siby (to (Malaysia) Selangor)
—	DF	SWE	André Álvarez Pérez (to Landskrona, previously on loan)
—	DF	GHA	Banabas Tagoe (to Karlstad, previously on loan at Olympic)
—	MF	KOS	Patriot Sejdiu (to (Romania) UTA Arad, previously on loan at Öster)
—	MF	PLE	Moustafa Zeidan (to (Egypt) Al Masry, previously on loan at (Norway) Rosenborg)

=== AIK ===
In:

No.	Pos.	Nation	Player
5	DF	SWE	Lukas Bergquist (from Öster)
7	MF	SWE	Amel Mujanic (from Örgryte)
25	DF	CIV	Ibrahim Cissé (from (Finland) KuPS)
—	FW	SWE	Nikolaj Staykov (from Haninge)

Out:

No.	Pos.	Nation	Player
3	DF	SWE	Thomas Isherwood (to Elfsborg)
7	MF	SWE	Anton Salétros (to (United States) Chicago Fire)
11	FW	SWE	John Guidetti (to Rinkeby United)
32	DF	CRO	Filip Benković (to (China) Shenzhen Peng City)
47	FW	SWE	Alexander Fesshaie (to Helsingborg)
—	MF	SWE	Kazper Karlsson (reloan to Degerfors)
—	DF	SWE	Wilmer Olofsson (on loan to (Norway) Moss, previously on loan at Eskilstuna)
—	FW	LBR	Emmanuel Gono (on loan to Oddevold, previously on loan at (Norway) Start)
—	DF	SWE	Rasmus Bonde (to Rosengård, previously on loan at (Norway) Raufoss)
—	FW	SWE	William Hofvander (to Örgryte, previously on loan)

=== Elfsborg ===
In:

No.	Pos.	Nation	Player
1	GK	SWE	Tim Erlandsson (from Halmstad)
4	DF	SWE	Thomas Isherwood (from AIK)
19	MF	DEN	Julius Beck (on loan from (Austria) Sturm Graz)
—	MF	SLE	Momoh Kamara (on loan from (United States) Minnesota United 2)

Out:

No.	Pos.	Nation	Player
1	GK	SWE	Simon Eriksson (to (Spain) Racing Santander)
4	DF	NOR	Daniel Granli (free agent)
5	MF	BRA	Wenderson (on loan to (Brazil) Avaí)
7	MF	DEN	Jens Jakob Thomasen (to (Denmark) Lyngby)
13	DF	SWE	Johan Larsson (retired)
27	MF	SWE	Besfort Zeneli (to (Belgium) Union Saint-Gilloise)
—	GK	SWE	Melker Uppenberg (to Östersund, previously on loan at Umeå)
—	DF	TUN	Rami Kaib (to Halmstad, previously on loan)
—	FW	GHA	Jalal Abdullai (to (Norway) Molde, previously on loan)
—	FW	SWE	Camil Jebara (to (Norway) Lillestrøm, previously on loan at Kalmar)

=== Sirius ===
In:

No.	Pos.	Nation	Player
2	DF	GUI	Mohamed Soumah (from (Belgium) Jong Gent)
21	MF	SWE	Charlie Nildén (from Brommapojkarna)
25	FW	NGA	Samuel Adindu (from Hammarby, previously on loan at Hammarby TFF)

Out:

No.	Pos.	Nation	Player
5	DF	SWE	Tobias Carlsson (to (Iceland) FH)
6	MF	GER	Michael Martin (free agent)
13	DF	SWE	Jakob Voelkerling Persson (to Helsingborg)
14	MF	FIN	Leo Walta (on loan to (Wales) Swansea City)
16	FW	SWE	Herman Sjögrell (to (Finland) Jaro)
18	MF	SWE	Adam Wikman (on loan to (Denmark) Silkeborg)
21	DF	SWE	Dennis Widgren (to Östersund)
36	MF	SWE	August Ljungberg (on loan to (Norway) Egersund)
—	DF	GEO	Saba Mamatsashvili (on loan to (Lithuania) Žalgiris, previously on loan at Kalmar)
—	MF	SWE	Filip Olsson (to Öster, previously on loan at Sandviken)

=== Häcken ===
In:

No.	Pos.	Nation	Player
9	FW	SWE	Gustav Lindgren (from (England) Peterborough United)
14	FW	SWE	Jeremy Agbonifo (on loan from (France) Lens, previously on loan at (Switzerland) Basel)
19	MF	SWE	David Seger (from (Bulgaria) CSKA Sofia)
22	DF	SWE	Filip Helander (from (Cyprus) Omonia, previously on loan)
35	GK	SWE	David Andersson (from Norrköping)

Out:

No.	Pos.	Nation	Player
4	DF	NOR	Marius Lode (on loan to (Australia) Brisbane Roar)
7	DF	DEN	Jacob Barrett Laursen (retired)
13	DF	SWE	Sigge Jansson (to Värnamo)
14	MF	SWE	Simon Gustafson (to (Poland) Korona Kielce)
15	MF	SWE	Samuel Leach Holm (to (Norway) Fredrikstad)
19	FW	UGA	John Paul Dembe (to (Czech Republic) Sigma Olomouc)
26	GK	SWE	Peter Abrahamsson (retired)
29	FW	CIV	Severin Nioule (on loan to Varberg)
31	MF	DEN	Lasse Madsen (to Brage)
32	GK	SWE	Oscar Jansson (free agent)
39	FW	SWE	Isak Brusberg (to (Poland) Raków Częstochowa)
—	DF	SWE	Johannes Engvall (reloan to Norrby)
—	DF	SWE	Charlie Axede (to Norrby, previously on loan at Torslanda)
—	MF	SWE	Joel Hjalmar (to Norrby, previously on loan)

=== Halmstad ===
In:

No.	Pos.	Nation	Player
9	FW	PLE	Omar Faraj (from (Egypt) Zamalek)
14	MF	SWE	Hussein Carneil (from (Spain) Atlético Sanluqueño)
16	DF	EST	Erko Tõugjas (from (Estonia) Flora)
20	MF	FIN	Otso Liimatta (on loan from (Portugal) Famalicão, previously on loan at Värnamo)
21	MF	SWE	Joel Nilsson (from (Norway) Kongsvinger)
24	DF	TUN	Rami Kaib (from Elfsborg, previously on loan)
27	MF	FRA	Rocco Ascone (from (Denmark) Nordsjælland, previously on loan)
38	GK	DEN	William Lykke (on loan from (Denmark) Nordsjælland)

Out:

No.	Pos.	Nation	Player
2	DF	SWE	Bleon Kurtulus (to Malmö)
11	MF	SWE	Villiam Granath (to Mjällby)
12	GK	SWE	Tim Erlandsson (to Elfsborg)
13	MF	ISL	Gísli Eyjólfsson (to (Iceland) ÍA)
14	FW	JAM	Blair Turgott (to (Greece) Chania)
18	FW	GHA	Naeem Mohammed (to (South Korea) Chungnam Asan)
21	DF	SWE	Marcus Olsson (free agent)
—	GK	SWE	Zackarias Nilsson (reloan to Astrio)
—	DF	SWE	Hjalmar Åberg (on loan to Laholm)
—	DF	SWE	Olle Johansson (on loan to Laholm)
—	MF	SWE	Måns Andersson (reloan to Laholm)
—	MF	SWE	Albin Ahlstrand (on loan to Hässleholm, previously on loan at Ängelholm)
—	DF	BRA	Vinícius Nogueira (to (Bulgaria) Ludogorets, previously on loan at (Norway) Vålerenga)
—	FW	SWE	Alex Hall (to Hässleholm, previously on loan at Ängelholm)
—	FW	POL	Paweł Chrupałła (to (Norway) Egersund, previously on loan at Helsingborg)
—	FW	SWE	Rasmus Wiedesheim-Paul (to (Netherlands) Roda JC, previously on loan at Oddevold)

=== Brommapojkarna ===
In:

No.	Pos.	Nation	Player
3	DF	DEN	Andreas Troelsen (from (Denmark) Esbjerg)
7	FW	NOR	Obilor Okeke (from Hammarby)
9	FW	DEN	Mads Hansen (from (Norway) Brann)
10	MF	NOR	Oliver Berg (from Malmö)
16	DF	SWE	Simon Strand (from Hammarby)
23	DF	SWE	Jordan Simpson (from Hammarby TFF)
28	FW	NGA	Courage Otokwefor (from (Ghana) Accra Lions, previously on loan)
—	FW	NGA	Bidemi Amole (on loan from (Nigeria) Real Sapphire)

Out:

No.	Pos.	Nation	Player
3	DF	NOR	Even Hovland (to (Norway) Sogndal)
4	DF	SWE	Eric Björkander (free agent)
7	FW	DEN	Victor Lind (to Hammarby)
8	DF	SWE	Adam Stroud (on loan to (Finland) Mariehamn)
12	MF	SWE	Charlie Nildén (to Sirius)
15	MF	SEN	El Hadji Fallou Faye (on loan to Enköping)
19	MF	SYR	Daleho Irandust (to (China) Shaanxi Union)
22	DF	SWE	Liam Tahwildaran (to Assyriska)
23	FW	GHA	Ezekiel Alladoh (to (United States) Philadelphia Union)
26	DF	ARM	André Calisir (retired)
28	DF	SWE	Isak Ssewankambo (to (Canada) Vancouver FC)
31	MF	SWE	Love Arrhov (to (Germany) Eintracht Frankfurt)
37	MF	SWE	Oskar Jarde (on loan to FC Stockholm)
39	FW	SWE	Nabil Bahoui (retired)
—	MF	SWE	Alfons Lohake (to Hammarby TFF, previously on loan at Nacka)
—	MF	SWE	Paya Pichkah (to (Norway) Bryne, previously on loan at (Norway) Egersund)

=== Degerfors ===
In:

No.	Pos.	Nation	Player
4	MF	SWE	Kazper Karlsson (reloan from AIK)
8	MF	SWE	Bilal Hussein (from (Germany) Hertha BSC II)
13	MF	GHA	Yiriyon Gideon (on loan from (Ghana) Inter Allies, previously on loan at Umeå)
14	MF	SWE	Ludvig Fritzson (free agent)
18	DF	SEN	Samba Diatara (from (Portugal) Braga B)
19	MF	SWE	Alexander Lindgren (from Haninge)
28	DF	ESP	Jesús Hernández (from (Spain) Juventud Torremolinos)

Out:

No.	Pos.	Nation	Player
4	DF	SWE	Leon Hien (to Djurgården)
9	FW	SWE	Adi Fišić (to Nordic United)
11	MF	SWE	Christos Gravius (free agent)
19	FW	SWE	Richie Omorowa (loan return to (Turkey) Samsunspor)
24	MF	SWE	Hjalmar Smedberg (to Woodys FC)
28	DF	CAN	Marcus Godinho (to (Canada) HFX Wanderers)
29	FW	FIN	Santeri Haarala (loan return to Djurgården)
30	DF	POR	Bernardo Morgado (to (Kazakhstan) Caspiy)
39	DF	CGO	Philippe Ndinga (to (United States) Philadelphia Union)
—	DF	SWE	Alexander Hedén Lindskog (on loan to FBK Karlstad, previously on loan at Oddevold)
—	MF	SWE	Teo Grönborg (to Nordic United, previously on loan at Umeå)
—	MF	SWE	Maill Lundgren (to (Republic of Ireland) Shelbourne, previously on loan at Sandviken)

=== Västerås ===
In:

No.	Pos.	Nation	Player
3	DF	DEN	Marcus Baggesen (from Norrköping)
7	FW	SWE	Abdelrahman Boudah (on loan from (Japan) Albirex Niigata)
14	MF	KOS	Ismet Lushaku (from Norrköping)
15	DF	SWE	Jonathan Karlsson (reloan from Hammarby)
23	MF	SWE	Lucas Sibelius (from Falkenberg)
24	DF	SWE	Jack Tagesson (from Nordic United)

Out:

No.	Pos.	Nation	Player
6	MF	SWE	Simon Johansson (retired)
7	MF	BRA	Pedro Ribeiro (to Skiljebo)
24	FW	SWE	Julius Johansson (to Norrby)
33	DF	SEN	Sidy Sow (loan return to (Senegal) Teungueth)
42	DF	SWE	Tim Hartzell (to (South Korea) Ansan Greeners)
44	DF	SWE	Max Larsson (to Djurgården)
—	DF	NOR	Liiban Abadid (on loan to Nordic United, previously on loan at Utsikten)
—	DF	SWE	Hugo Björk (to Skiljebo, previously on loan at Franke)
—	MF	SWE	Hugo Engström (to Oddevold, previously on loan at Trelleborg)

=== Kalmar ===
In:

No.	Pos.	Nation	Player
2	DF	SWE	Victor Larsson (from Värnamo)
6	MF	SWE	Vilmer Tyrén (from Göteborg, previously on loan at Ljungskile)
7	MF	NED	Nassef Chourak (from (Netherlands) Jong Ajax)
10	MF	FIN	Marius Söderbäck (from (Finland) Ilves)
18	DF	NGA	Sodiq Lawal (from (Nigeria) Remo Stars)
20	DF	MAR	Achraf Dari (on loan from (Egypt) Al Ahly)
24	FW	ENG	Charles Sagoe Jr (on loan from (England) Arsenal, previously on loan at (England) Shrewsbury Town)

Out:

No.	Pos.	Nation	Player
6	DF	SWE	Rasmus Sjöstedt (to Berga)
7	FW	GHA	Isaac Atanga (to (Iceland) Þór Akureyri)
10	FW	SWE	Camil Jebara (loan return to Elfsborg)
14	MF	CIV	Awaka Djoro (on loan to Oddevold)
16	MF	SWE	William Andersson (on loan to Karlskrona)
19	FW	FIN	Saku Ylätupa (to (Finland) Gnistan)
20	MF	GAM	Gibril Sosseh (to (Czech Republic) Slavia Prague)
24	MF	SWE	Wilmer Andersson (on loan to Karlskrona)
26	DF	SWE	Arash Motaraghebjafarpour (free agent)
33	DF	GEO	Saba Mamatsashvili (loan return to Sirius)
37	FW	LTU	Tomas Kalinauskas (loan return to (England) Burton Albion)
—	GK	SWE	Casper Andersson (reloan to Karlskrona)
—	FW	SWE	Ville Nilsson (on loan to Karlskrona, previously on loan at Oskarshamn)
—	DF	SWE	Arvin Davoudi-Kia (to Staffanstorp United, previously on loan at Oskarshamn)

=== Örgryte ===
In:

No.	Pos.	Nation	Player
2	DF	ENG	Michael Parker (from (England) West Bromwich Albion, previously on loan at (England) Hereford)
8	MF	CAN	Benjamin Laturnus (from Hammarby TFF)
10	MF	SWE	Rasmus Alm (from (United States) St. Louis City)
15	FW	NGA	Jerome Tibbling Ugwo (from Assyriska)
17	FW	SWE	William Hofvander (from AIK, previously on loan)
25	MF	SWE	Demirel Hodžić (on loan from (Italy) Milan Futuro)
30	GK	SWE	Mathias Nilsson (from Trelleborg)
33	DF	SWE	Sebastian Lagerlund (from Utsikten)

Out:

No.	Pos.	Nation	Player
8	MF	SWE	Amel Mujanic (to AIK)
10	FW	SWE	Nicklas Bärkroth (retired)
13	DF	SWE	Carl Millard Javette (on loan to Gefle)
15	MF	SWE	Isak Dahlqvist (to (Austria) Blau-Weiß Linz)
20	FW	SWE	Månz Karlsson (on loan to Torslanda)
25	MF	RSA	Waylon Renecke (loan return to (Denmark) Copenhagen U19)
27	DF	SWE	Rami Jassim (to Hässleholm)
—	GK	SWE	Lukas Pihlblad (loan return to Öster)
—	FW	SWE	Philip Bergqvist (on loan to Torslanda)
—	GK	SWE	Lucas Samuelsson (to Landvetter, previously on loan at Västra Frölunda)
—	DF	SWE	William Alder (free agent, previously on loan at Jonsered)
—	MF	SWE	Ibrahim Ahmed (to Eskilstuna, previously on loan at Ängelholm)

== Superettan ==
Note: Flags indicate national team as has been defined under FIFA eligibility rules. Players may hold more than one non-FIFA nationality.

=== Norrköping ===
In:

No.	Pos.	Nation	Player
2	DF	NGA	Victor Romanus (from (Czech Republic) České Budějovice B)
4	DF	NOR	Jonas Weber (from (Norway) Tromsdalen)
6	MF	SWE	Viktor Christiansson (from Trelleborg)
8	MF	ENG	Ryan Nelson (from (Norway) Raufoss)
10	FW	NOR	Albert Aleksanjan (from (Norway) Ull/Kisa)
11	FW	SWE	Elias Jemal (on loan from (Norway) Sandefjord, previously on loan at (Norway) Start)
15	FW	BFA	Kylian Seka (from (Mali) ABM Foot, previously on loan at Stocksund)
19	MF	SWE	Leo Lif (from Eskilstuna)
22	FW	SEN	Mbaye Cissé (from (Senegal) Teungueth)
23	DF	NOR	Aleksander Opsahl (from (Norway) Arendal)
25	DF	SWE	Filip Dagerstål (free agent)
30	DF	NOR	Fabian Holst-Larsen (from (Norway) Mjøndalen)

Out:

No.	Pos.	Nation	Player
3	DF	DEN	Marcus Baggesen (to Västerås)
4	DF	SWE	Amadeus Sögaard (to (United States) Sarasota Paradise)
8	FW	ISL	Ísak Andri Sigurgeirsson (on loan to (Denmark) Viborg)
9	MF	ISL	Arnór Ingvi Traustason (to (Iceland) KR Reykjavík)
10	FW	SWE	David Moberg Karlsson (to (Japan) Tochigi City)
11	MF	KOS	Ismet Lushaku (to Västerås)
14	DF	SWE	Yahya Kalley (to (Portugal) Estrela da Amadora)
18	FW	ISL	Jónatan Gudni Arnarsson (to (Iceland) Breiðablik)
19	DF	SWE	Max Watson (to (Poland) Ruch Chorzów)
25	DF	SWE	Kevin Höög Jansson (to (Portugal) Estrela da Amadora)
40	GK	SWE	David Andersson (to Häcken)
45	GK	SWE	Christoffer Petersen (free agent)
—	MF	SWE	Jesper Lindvall (to Åtvidaberg, previously on loan at Sylvia)
—	FW	ALB	Laorent Shabani (to (Albania) Partizani, previously on loan at Varberg)

=== Öster ===
In:

No.	Pos.	Nation	Player
2	DF	FIN	Aapo Mäenpää (from (Finland) Ilves)
9	FW	SWE	Linus Carlstrand (from Göteborg, previously on loan at Ljungskile)
11	MF	SWE	Filip Olsson (from Sirius, previously on loan at Sandviken)
18	FW	GAM	Musa Njie (from (The Gambia) BST Galaxy)
20	DF	GAM	Musa Jatta (from (Finland) Oulu)
23	FW	SWE	Samuel Burakovsky (on loan from (Norway) Bodø/Glimt, previously on loan at (Denmark) Kolding)
29	MF	SWE	Karl Wendt (on loan from (Poland) Lechia Gdańsk, previously on loan at Trelleborg)
33	GK	USA	Michael Hartmann (from Oskarshamn)

Out:

No.	Pos.	Nation	Player
7	MF	FIN	Anssi Suhonen (loan return to (Germany) Hamburger SV)
9	FW	SWE	Niklas Söderberg (to Nordic United)
13	GK	SWE	Robin Wallinder (to Mjällby)
15	DF	SRB	Ivan Kričak (to (Israel) Hapoel Haifa)
18	MF	SWE	Daniel Ljung (to Ljungskile)
20	FW	SWE	Alibek Aliev (to (Romania) CFR Cluj)
21	DF	SWE	Lukas Bergquist (to AIK)
23	MF	MNE	Vladimir Rodić (to (Uzbekistan) Buxoro)
24	MF	KOS	Patriot Sejdiu (loan return to Malmö)
33	DF	FIN	Tatu Varmanen (free agent)
34	FW	SWE	Joel Voelkerling Persson (to Rosengård)
—	GK	SWE	Lukas Pihlblad (on loan to Umeå, previously on loan at Örgryte)
—	FW	SWE	Gustav Fälth (reloan to Räppe GoIF)
—	GK	BIH	Mirsad Bašić (to (Iceland) Keflavík, previously on loan at Oskarshamn)
—	MF	SWE	Philipp Berndt (to Räppe GoIF, previously on loan)
—	FW	SWE	Vincent Poppler (to Trelleborg, previously on loan at Oddevold)

=== Värnamo ===
In:

No.	Pos.	Nation	Player
4	DF	SWE	Samuel Ohlsson (from Ljungskile)
5	DF	SWE	Douglas Bergqvist (from (Czech Republic) Vlašim)
11	MF	SYR	Noah Shamoun (reloan from (Denmark) Randers)
13	DF	SWE	Sigge Jansson (from Häcken)
23	MF	ISL	Logi Hrafn Róbertsson (from (Croatia) Istra 1961)
39	GK	POL	Błażej Sapielak (from (Poland) MKS Kluczbork, previously on loan at (Poland) LZS Starowice)

Out:

No.	Pos.	Nation	Player
5	DF	SWE	Victor Larsson (to Kalmar)
8	MF	FIN	Otso Liimatta (loan return to (Portugal) Famalicão)
10	FW	SWE	Ajdin Zeljkovic (to (Kazakhstan) Aktobe)
11	MF	NOR	Kent-Are Antonsen (loan return to (Norway) Tromsø)
15	FW	SWE	Paweł Cibicki (to Bosnien Hercegovinas)
18	FW	SYR	Mohammad Alsalkhadi (to (Saudi Arabia) Damac)
20	DF	SWE	Freddy Winsth (retired)
24	DF	SWE	Emin Grozdanic (free agent)
39	GK	SWE	Viktor Andersson (on loan to Göteborg)

=== Oddevold ===
In:

No.	Pos.	Nation	Player
5	DF	SWE	Esim Mehmed (from AFC Malmö)
7	DF	SWE	Vincent Sundberg (from Haninge)
10	FW	LBN	Leonardo Farah Shahin (from Falkenberg)
13	FW	LBR	Emmanuel Gono (on loan from AIK, previously on loan at (Norway) Start)
15	MF	SWE	Elias Forsberg (from Trollhättan)
16	MF	CIV	Awaka Djoro (on loan from Kalmar)
19	MF	SWE	Hugo Engström (from Västerås, previously on loan at Trelleborg)
22	DF	SWE	Johan Albin (from Eskilsminne)
24	DF	SWE	Mattias Bahno (from IFK Skövde)
33	GK	SWE	Filip Järlesand (from Skövde)

Out:

No.	Pos.	Nation	Player
5	DF	SWE	Anton Snibb (free agent)
7	DF	SWE	Filip Karlin (to Uddevalla)
10	MF	SWE	Liridon Kalludra (to Mellerud)
13	MF	RWA	York Rafael (to (South Korea) Anyang)
14	MF	SWE	Carl Ådahl (to FBK Karlstad)
15	FW	SWE	Vincent Poppler (loan return to Öster)
16	MF	NOR	Emir Derviškadić (loan return to (Norway) Haugesund)
19	FW	SWE	Rasmus Wiedesheim-Paul (loan return to Halmstad)
22	MF	SWE	Albert Ejupi (to Kristianstad)
23	DF	SWE	Viktor Krüger (free agent)
24	DF	SWE	Alexander Hedén Lindskog (loan return to Degerfors)

=== Falkenberg ===
In:

No.	Pos.	Nation	Player
10	FW	SWE	Elias Mohammad (free agent)
14	FW	SWE	William Videhult (from Sollentuna)
17	DF	KOS	Argjend Miftari (from Mjällby, previously on loan at Karlstad)
18	MF	CIV	Lassina Sangaré (free agent)
21	MF	SWE	Lion Beqiri (from Häcken U19)
29	FW	FRA	Hugo Komano (from (Switzerland) Yverdon-Sport)

Out:

No.	Pos.	Nation	Player
9	FW	SWE	Remo Gotfredsen Grgić (to Trelleborg)
10	FW	LBN	Leonardo Farah Shahin (to Oddevold)
14	FW	SWE	Isaac Shears (to Ljungskile)
17	MF	SWE	Lucas Sibelius (to Västerås)
22	FW	SWE	Viktor Ekblom (to (Norway) Tromsø)
26	MF	SWE	Seif Ali Hindi (to (Czech Republic) Dukla Prague)
33	DF	SWE	Melker Larsson (to Tvååker)
—	MF	SWE	Melwin Kocanovic (reloan to Böljan)
—	MF	SWE	Adam Frånberg (free agent, previously on loan at Varbergs GIF)
—	MF	SWE	Edvin Christiansson (to Böljan, previously on loan)
—	FW	SWE	Adam Ekenhard (to Böljan, previously on loan)

=== Varberg ===
In:

No.	Pos.	Nation	Player
7	MF	SWE	Wilhelm Ärlig (from (Norway) Kongsvinger)
10	MF	FIN	Axel Vidjeskog (from Trelleborg)
12	FW	CIV	Severin Nioule (on loan from Häcken)
15	DF	SWE	Noah Johansson (from Utsikten)
19	MF	SWE	Jonathan Nilsson (from Hässleholm)
49	FW	HAI	Shanyder Borgelin (from (Indonesia) Bhayangkara Presisi)

Out:

No.	Pos.	Nation	Player
7	MF	SWE	Robin Tranberg (free agent)
8	MF	SWE	Anton Liljenbäck (to Rosengård)
10	FW	ALB	Laorent Shabani (loan return to Norrköping)
13	MF	SWE	Olle Edlund (to FC Stockholm)
15	FW	SWE	Jesper Westermark (loan return to Halmstad)
17	FW	SWE	Liam Olausson (to Sleipner)
19	MF	SWE	Nils Salomonsson Önnebo (on loan to Ängelholm)
22	MF	SWE	Zakaria Loukili (loan return to Malmö)
23	MF	AUS	Marc Tokich (free agent)
25	DF	SWE	Arvid Wiklund (to Utsikten)
29	GK	SWE	Fredrik Andersson (to Göteborg)
42	FW	UGA	Calvin Kabuye (loan return to Mjällby)
—	DF	SWE	David Gustafsson (on loan to Utsikten)
—	DF	SWE	Viggo Gustavsson (on loan to Tvååker, previously on loan at Trollhättan)
—	GK	SWE	Viktor Dryselius (to Böljan, previously on loan)
—	DF	SWE	Albin Berggren (to Böljan, previously on loan)
—	DF	SWE	Leo Frigell Jansson (to Eskilsminne, previously on loan at Umeå)
—	MF	SWE	Måns Andersson (to Tvååker, previously on loan)
—	MF	SWE	Diego Alfonsi (Karlstad, previously on loan at Tvååker)

=== Helsingborg ===
In:

No.	Pos.	Nation	Player
2	DF	USA	Femi Awodesu (from (United States) Houston Dynamo)
3	DF	SWE	Jakob Voelkerling Persson (from Sirius)
7	FW	SWE	Alexander Fesshaie (from AIK)
20	MF	SWE	Leo Hedenberg (from Ängelholm)
21	MF	COL	Harol Romaña (from (Colombia) CBJ Cali)
22	MF	LUX	Timothé Rupil (from (Germany) Schalke 04 II)
26	MF	KOS	Loret Sadiku (free agent)
27	DF	FRA	Demba N'Diaye (from (France) Dunkerque B)
29	FW	NED	Kevin Appiah Nyarko (from (Finland) SJK)
45	MF	CMR	Daouda Amadou (from (United States) Colorado Rapids)
58	DF	CMR	Clancy Biten (from (France) Strasbourg B)

Out:

No.	Pos.	Nation	Player
2	DF	SWE	Jon Birkfeldt (retired)
3	DF	SWE	Wilhelm Nilsson (to (Denmark) B.93)
7	MF	SWE	Wilhelm Loeper (to (Romania) Csíkszereda)
19	DF	SWE	Benjamin Örn (to (Denmark) Randers)
20	FW	SWE	Baker Amer (to Eskilsminne)
21	MF	COL	Harol Romaña (free agent)
22	DF	NOR	Max Bjurström (on loan to (Finland) Gnistan)
29	FW	NOR	Oscar Aga (loan return to (Norway) Rosenborg)
30	GK	SWE	Emil Rådahl (on loan to Åstorp)
41	FW	POL	Paweł Chrupałła (loan return to Halmstad)
—	DF	GAM	Ebrima Bajo (free agent, previously on loan at Rosengård)
—	FW	DEN	Milan Rasmussen (to (Denmark) AB, previously on loan at (Denmark) HIK)

=== Brage ===
In:

No.	Pos.	Nation	Player
6	MF	DEN	Lasse Madsen (from Häcken)
8	MF	SWE	Albin Sporrong (from Östersund)
12	FW	SWE	Alex Mortensen (from Ljungskile)
14	FW	NOR	Jakob Rømo Skille (from (Norway) Ull/Kisa)
22	DF	DEN	Tobias Stagaard (from (Denmark) Esbjerg)
23	DF	SWE	Felix Hörberg (from Trelleborg)
24	DF	SWE	Anders Hellblom (from FC Stockholm)
28	MF	SWE	Gideon Granström (from Djurgården, previously on loan at Östersund)
30	GK	SWE	Johan Guadagno (free agent)

Out:

No.	Pos.	Nation	Player
8	MF	SWE	Jacob Stensson (to (Iceland) Vestri)
12	DF	SWE	Noah Åstrand John (to Malmö)
22	DF	SWE	Cesar Weilid (to FC Stockholm)
30	GK	SWE	Elias Markusson Kurula (to Sleipner)
33	FW	IRQ	Amar Muhsin (to (South Korea) Gimpo)
—	MF	SWE	Jonah Almquist (free agent, previously on loan at Falu)
—	MF	SWE	Emil Tot Wikström (to Halmia, previously on loan at Umeå)

=== Landskrona ===
In:

No.	Pos.	Nation	Player
2	DF	SWE	William Åkesson (on loan from Malmö)
6	DF	SWE	Tobias Karlsson (from Trelleborg)
7	FW	FIN	Salomo Ojala (from (Finland) Ekenäs)
12	DF	CMR	Emmanuel Moungam (from (Denmark) Horsens U19)
18	DF	SWE	André Álvarez Pérez (from Malmö, previously on loan)
23	MF	SWE	Zakaria Loukili (on loan from Malmö, previously on loan at Varberg)
—	MF	JPN	Kota Sakurai (from (Lithuania) Sūduva)

Out:

No.	Pos.	Nation	Player
6	MF	SWE	Hampus Näsström (to (Faroe Islands) Klaksvík)
7	MF	SWE	Victor Karlsson (to Tvååker)
12	DF	SWE	Melker Jonsson (to (Denmark) Silkeborg)
14	FW	SWE	Cameron Streete (to (Norway) Hødd)
16	DF	SWE	Rassa Rahmani (to (Austria) SCR Altach)
23	MF	SWE	Max Nilsson (to (Norway) Fredrikstad)

=== Sandviken ===
In:

No.	Pos.	Nation	Player
12	MF	USA	Alan Carleton (from (United States) Huntsville City)
15	MF	SWE	Fabian Andersson (from Stocksund)
19	FW	SWE	Anomnachi Chidi (from (Slovenia) Celje, previously on loan at (Bosnia and Herzegovina) Sarajevo)
22	FW	DEN	Christian Wagner (from (Denmark) Thisted)
—	DF	SWE	Nino Geiger (from Karlberg)

Out:

No.	Pos.	Nation	Player
8	MF	SWE	Daniel Söderberg (to (Norway) Odd)
10	MF	SWE	Moonga Simba (to (Romania) Hermannstadt)
12	DF	SWE	Christopher Redenstrand (to Örebro)
15	MF	SWE	Filip Olsson (loan return to Sirius)
17	DF	MLI	Mamadou Kouyaté (to Gefle)
18	MF	CAN	Kamron Habibullah (to (Canada) Atlético Ottawa)
19	MF	RWA	Yannick Mukunzi (free agent)
20	MF	SWE	Pontus Carlsson (to Hässleholm)
23	DF	SWE	Emil Engqvist (to (Norway) Aalesund)
27	MF	SWE	Maill Lundgren (loan return to Degerfors)
37	FW	KOS	Dion Krasniqi (loan return to Elfsborg)
99	FW	SWE	Kim Käck Ofordu (to Karlstad)
—	DF	SWE	Nino Geiger (on loan to Karlberg)
—	FW	SWE	Ruben Martin (free agent, previously on loan at Sandvikens AIK)

=== Sundsvall ===
In:

No.	Pos.	Nation	Player
4	DF	SWE	Jakob Hedenquist (from Umeå)
5	DF	SWE	Alieu Atlee Manneh (from Djurgården U19)
15	FW	GAM	Suwaibou Kebbeh (on loan from Hammarby)
29	DF	FRA	Randy Bandolo Obam (from (France) Strasbourg B)

Out:

No.	Pos.	Nation	Player
3	DF	TUN	Monir Jelassi (free agent)
5	DF	SWE	Dennis Olsson (retired)
7	MF	SWE	Ture Sandberg (loan return to Norrköping)
8	MF	USA	Marcelo Palomino (to (United States) Orange County)
13	GK	SWE	Daniel Henareh (on loan to Karlstad)
14	FW	SWE	Abdulahi Shino (on loan to Lucksta)
21	FW	SWE	Pontus Engblom (retired)
24	DF	FIN	Nikolas Talo (loan return to (Finland) Haka)
29	FW	ESP	Carlos Martínez (to (Spain) Olot)
—	DF	SWE	Anton Mossnelid (retired, previously on loan at Team TG)
—	MF	SWE	Edwin Dellkrans (free agent, previously on loan at Kubikenborg)
—	MF	SWE	Oliver Grenholm (to Skellefteå, previously on loan at Kubikenborg)
—	FW	HAI	Ronaldo Damus (to (United States) Birmingham Legion, previously on loan)

=== Östersund ===
In:

No.	Pos.	Nation	Player
1	GK	SWE	Melker Uppenberg (from Elfsborg, previously on loan at Umeå)
3	DF	FRA	Hugo Azzi (from (France) Onet-le-Château)
4	DF	SWE	Jonathan Westerberg (from Karlberg)
5	DF	SWE	Abodi Qasem (from Motala)
8	MF	SWE	Emil Özkan (from Enköping)
9	FW	NOR	Abel Stensrud (from (Norway) Skeid)
12	GK	DEN	William Tønning (from (Iceland) KA)
15	MF	CMR	Donald Molls (from (Bosnia and Herzegovina) Rudar Prijedor)
16	MF	BIH	Amar Begić (from (Georgia (country)) Kolkheti Poti)
17	MF	ENG	Curtis Edwards (from (England) Gateshead)
18	FW	ESP	Mario Palomino Delgado (from (Spain) Inter Granada)
19	DF	SWE	Dennis Widgren (from Sirius)
21	MF	BIH	Luka Božičković (from (Slovenia) Aluminij)
27	MF	SWE	Daniel Miljanović (from Nordic United)

Out:

No.	Pos.	Nation	Player
1	GK	SWE	Christopher Lundhall (to (Norway) Levanger)
2	DF	DEN	Christian Enemark (loan return to (Denmark) Hobro)
3	DF	CAN	Chrisnovic N'sa (to (Malta) Gżira United)
4	DF	SWE	Theodor Johansson (to Nordic United)
6	FW	SWE	Adrian Edqvist (to (Faroe Islands) Runavík)
8	MF	BRA	Erick Brendon (to (Malaysia) Penang)
9	FW	ENG	James Kirby (to (Malta) Marsaxlokk)
11	MF	ENG	Jamie Hopcutt (to (United Arab Emirates) Forte Virtus)
12	GK	DEN	William Tønning (to (New Zealand) Napier City Rovers)
14	FW	SWE	Jabir Abdihakim Ali (to (Finland) VPS)
15	MF	SWE	Gideon Granström (loan return to Djurgården)
16	MF	SWE	Albin Sporrong (to Brage)
22	MF	SWE	Ahmed Bonnah (to (Moldova) Zimbru Chișinău)
25	FW	SMA	Chovanie Amatkarijo (loan return to GAIS)
26	MF	SWE	Albin Mörfelt (to (Iceland) Vestri)
27	DF	SYR	Ziad Ghanoum (to FC Stockholm)
29	DF	SWE	Arvid Holgén (on loan to IFK Östersund)
32	GK	SWE	Max Croon (loan return to Djurgården)

=== Örebro ===
In:

No.	Pos.	Nation	Player
5	MF	SWE	Jacob Ortmark (from Hammarby)
8	MF	SWE	Manasse Kusu (on loan from Mjällby, previously on loan at (Finland) Jaro)
7	MF	SWE	Samuel Wikman (from Vasalund)
11	DF	SWE	Christopher Redenstrand (from Sandviken)
22	DF	AUS	Giuseppe Bovalina (on loan from (Canada) Vancouver Whitecaps)

Out:

No.	Pos.	Nation	Player
1	GK	SWE	Malte Påhlsson (to Trelleborg)
3	DF	SWE	Joseph Baffoe (to (Iraq) Al-Karkh)
5	DF	SWE	Jesper Modig (to Trelleborg)
6	MF	BIH	Melvin Bajrović (to Vasalund)
7	MF	SWE	Erik Andersson (to (Finland) Lahti)
10	MF	SWE	Sebastian Tipura (to Trelleborg)
11	MF	SWE	Samuel Kroon (to (Iceland) KA)
14	DF	SWE	Ludvig Richtnér (loan return to Elfsborg)
19	FW	GHA	Blessing Asumang (to GAIS)
27	DF	SWE	Herman Bruhn (free agent)
—	MF	SYR	Simon Amin (to (Iraq) Al-Mosul)
—	DF	SWE	Theodor Hansemon (to Gefle, previously on loan)
—	DF	SWE	Oskar Käck (to Sollentuna, previously on loan at Gefle)
—	MF	SWE	Aleksandar Azizovic (to Eskilstuna, previously on loan at Vasalund)
—	MF	SWE	Hamse Shagaxle (to (Italy) Spezia, previously on loan at Örebro Syrianska)

=== Nordic United ===
In:

No.	Pos.	Nation	Player
4	DF	NOR	Liiban Abadid (on loan from Västerås, previously on loan at Utsikten)
5	DF	SWE	Elias Andersson (from (Denmark) Randers)
8	MF	SWE	Teo Grönborg (from Degerfors, previously on loan at Umeå)
11	FW	SWE	Adi Fišić (from Degerfors)
12	MF	SWE	Jake Larsson (free agent)
14	FW	SWE	Kamil Dawid Dudziak (from Karlberg)
17	FW	SWE	Kalipha Jawla (on loan from Djurgården, previously on loan at Utsikten)
22	FW	SWE	Niklas Söderberg (from Öster)
24	DF	SWE	Theodor Johansson (from Östersund)
27	DF	SWE	David Tokpah (from Utsikten)
30	GK	SWE	William Eskelinen (from (Finland) Oulu)
74	MF	SWE	Christian Aphrem (from Assyriska)

Out:

No.	Pos.	Nation	Player
4	MF	SWE	Filip Rogić (to Eskilstuna)
14	MF	SWE	Daniel Miljanović (to Östersund)
19	DF	SWE	Ludvig Berggren (to Nyköpings BIS)
24	FW	CHI	Linton Ulloa Niinivirta (to (Norway) Stjørdals-Blink)
30	GK	SWE	Dejan Garača (retired)
31	GK	SWE	Peter Stahl (to Newroz)
42	DF	SWE	Jack Tagesson (to Västerås)
44	FW	NGA	Samuel Nnamani (to Assyriska)
—	FW	SWE	Philip Yarar (on loan to Nacka)

=== Ljungskille ===
In:

No.	Pos.	Nation	Player
2	DF	SWE	Rasmus Dahlin (reloan from Göteborg U19)
4	DF	GHA	Issaka Seidu (on loan from (Denmark) Nordsjælland)
8	MF	NOR	Magnus Tomren Solheim (from (Norway) Stjørdals-Blink)
15	MF	SWE	David Frisk (from IFK Skövde)
16	DF	SWE	Emilio Reljanovic (from Trollhättan)
18	FW	SWE	Hugo Borstam (from Sölvesborg)
20	GK	NZL	Cameron Hogg (from Trollhättan)
27	FW	SWE	Alfons Borén (on loan from Göteborg)
45	FW	SWE	Isaac Shears (from Falkenberg)
58	MF	SWE	Samuel Adrian (free agent)
69	DF	BIH	Ivan Marić (from (Bosnia and Herzegovina) Široki Brijeg)
71	MF	SWE	Daniel Ljung (from Öster)

Out:

No.	Pos.	Nation	Player
4	DF	SWE	Samuel Ohlsson (to Värnamo)
8	MF	SWE	Vilmer Tyrén (loan return to Göteborg)
12	DF	SWE	Samuel Högblom (on loan to Grebbestad)
15	MF	SWE	Jonatan Vennberg (to Skara)
16	FW	SWE	Jesper Zetterlund (to Ahlafors)
17	MF	SWE	Alexander Björk (on loan to Grebbestad)
18	FW	SWE	Linus Carlstrand (loan return to Göteborg)
19	DF	SWE	Pontus Olsson (to Utsiktens)
20	DF	SWE	Milos Andelkovic (to (Italy) Enna)
21	FW	NGA	Anya Arinze Kingsley (free agent)
33	FW	SWE	Alex Mortensen (to Brage)
—	MF	NGA	Ofonime Harrison (free agent)
—	DF	SWE	Gustav Bendrik (to Tvååker, previously on loan)

=== Norrby ===
In:

No.	Pos.	Nation	Player
3	DF	SWE	Johannes Engvall (reloan from Häcken)
4	DF	SWE	Albin Nedzibovic (from Hässleholm)
6	MF	SWE	Joel Hjalmar (from Häcken, previously on loan)
9	FW	NGA	Yusuf Abdulazeez (from Mjällby, previously on loan)
11	MF	SWE	Kevin Liimatainen (from Lund)
15	FW	SWE	Liam Björninger (from Torslanda)
16	MF	SWE	Filip Gustafsson (on loan from GAIS)
24	FW	SWE	Julius Johansson (from Västerås)
25	DF	SWE	Charlie Axede (from Häcken, previously on loan at Torslanda)
28	FW	NOR	Magnus Holte (on loan from (Norway) Rosenborg, previously on loan at (Norway) Hødd)

Out:

No.	Pos.	Nation	Player
4	MF	SWE	Linus Dahl (free agent)
7	DF	SWE	Alen Krasnici (retired)
9	FW	SWE	Chisomnazu Chika Chidi (loan return to GAIS)
11	MF	SWE	Max Andersson (to GAIS)
13	DF	SWE	Oskar Gaschet Lundgren (on loan to Hestrafor)
22	MF	SWE	Teo Helge (loan return to Mjällby)
24	FW	SWE	Lukas Paulsén (to (United States) Charlotte 49ers)
—	MF	SWE	Tim Ekelund (on loan to Dalstorp)

== See also ==
- 2026 Allsvenskan
- 2026 Superettan
