= 2022–23 Svenska Cupen =

Tournament details
- Country: Sweden
- Dates: 15 June 2022 – 18 May 2023
- Teams: 96

Final positions
- Champions: BK Häcken
- Runners-up: Mjällby AIF

Tournament statistics
- Matches played: 119
- Goals scored: 407 (3.42 per match)
- Top goal scorer(s): Linus Lyck; Amar Muhsin (4 goals each)
- All statistics correct as of 18 May 2023.

The 2022–23 Svenska Cupen was the 67th season of the Svenska Cupen and the eleventh season with the current format. The winners of the competition will secure a spot in the second qualifying round of the 2023–24 UEFA Europa Conference League, unless they had already qualified for European competition in the 2022–23 season, in which case the qualification spot will go to fourth-placed team of the 2022 Allsvenskan. A total of 96 clubs will enter the competition, 64 teams from district sites and 32 from the Allsvenskan and the Superettan.

== Round dates ==
The schedule of the competition is as follows.

Phase	Round	Match date
Initial rounds	Round 1	15 June – 30 July 2022
Initial rounds	Round 2	30 August – 1 September 2022
Group stage	Matchday 1	18/19 February 2023
Group stage	Matchday 2	25/26 February 2023
Group stage	Matchday 3	4/5 March 2023
Knockout stage	Quarter-final	11/12 March 2023
Knockout stage	Semi-final	18/19 March 2023
Knockout stage	Final	18 May 2023

== Teams ==
Round	Clubs remaining	Clubs involved	Winners from previous round	New entries this round	Leagues participating in this round
Round 1	96	64	0	64	Division 1 (22 teams); Division 2 (36 teams); Division 3 (6 teams)
Round 2	64	64	32	32	Allsvenskan (16 teams); Superettan (16 teams)
Group stage	32	32	32	0	

== Round 1 ==
64 clubs from the third tier or lower of the Swedish league system competed in this round.

=== Matches ===
15 June 2022	IFK Malmö	1–2	Lunds BK	Malmö
19:00 CEST (UTC+2)	Erlandsson 36'	Report	Wendt 52'; Olofsson 72' (yellow card) 90+5'	Stadium: Malmö Stadion; Attendance: 80; Referee: Rasmus Eriksson

21 June 2022	Korsnäs IF FK	1–3	Sandvikens IF	Falun
18:30 CEST (UTC+2)	Rombin (yellow card) 32'; Ribeiro 71'; Forsling (yellow card) 72'	Report	Springfeldt 14'; Igbarumah 35'; Al-Saed 56'	Stadium: Lindvallen; Attendance: 180; Referee: Patrik Larsson

28 June 2022	IFK Lidingö	2–4 (a.e.t.)	FC Stockholm Internazionale	Lidingö
19:00 CEST (UTC+2)	Baiche 1' (yellow card) 2'; Sonntag (yellow card) 37' (yellow-red card) 87'; Poppler (yellow card) 41'; Sjöberg 53'; Nilsson (yellow card) 81'; Pinones (yellow card) 120+1'	Report	Makolli 30' 37' (pen.) 117'; Danielsson (yellow card) 60'; Almström Tähti (red card) 62'; Dobrijevic (yellow card) 87'; Josefsson 105'	Stadium: Lidingövallen 2 Attendance: 103; Referee: Adli Assali

28 June 2022	Lindome GIF	0–1	GAIS	Lindome
19:30 CEST (UTC+2)	Johansson (yellow card) 44'; Naser (yellow card) 68'	Report	Friday 7'; Grozdanic (yellow card) 73'; Bawa (yellow card) 82'	Stadium: Lindevi IP 1 Konstgräs; Attendance: 761; Referee: Joseph Matti

29 June 2022	FC Trollhättan	3–1	Vänersborgs FK	Trollhättan
19:00 CEST (UTC+2)	Aliev 13' 21' (yellow card) 45'; Liimatainen 55'	Report	Enete 24'; Hoxhaj (yellow card) 45'	Stadium: Edsborgs IP A-plan; Referee: Vildan Gërxhaliu

29 June 2022	Husqvarna FF	4–2	Motala AIF	Huskvarna
19:30 CEST (UTC+2)	Björk 8'; Lind 32'; Rubin 59'; Alnator 77'	Report	Karlsson 30'; Forsberg (yellow card) 45+2'; Silka (yellow card) 52'; Ödberg 62' (yellow card) 85'; Åslund (yellow card) 90+5'	Stadium: Vapenvallen 1 Attendance: 100; Referee: Toni Galic

29 June 2022	Ullareds IK	3–4 (a.e.t.)	Onsala BK	Ullared
19:30 CEST (UTC+2)	Kalem Royson 32'; Sarzynski (yellow card) 52'; Wallnedal (yellow card) 68' (goal) 79'; Saeed 100'; Bodin (yellow card) 118'	Report	Ekdahl 72'; Berntsson 77' (pen.); Johansson (yellow card) 98'; Berglund 98'; Palmquist 114'	Stadium: Falkenbergs IP A Referee: Almir Kadiric

29 June 2022	FC Järfälla	1–3	IFK Stocksund	Järfälla
20:00 CEST (UTC+2)	Norén (yellow card) 24'; Danha 61'; Akdemir (yellow card) 90'	Report	Tristen 22'; Pektas 28'; Kamana (yellow card) 70'; Sohl (yellow card) 73'; Persson 79'	Stadium: Järfällavallen 1 Attendance: 169; Referee: Stefan Jovanovic

30 June 2022	Ängelholms FF	0–5	Tvååkers IF	Ängelholm
19:00 CEST (UTC+2)		Report	Alsalkhadi 3'; Bertilsson 22'; Nilsson 27' 76'; Andersson (yellow card) 45'; Petersson 54'; Rydell (yellow card) 80'	Stadium: Ängelholms IP A-plan; Attendance: 102; Referee: Gheorghe Piscoran

2 July 2022	Brålanda IF	6–2 (a.e.t.)	Vänersborgs IF	Brålanda
13:00 CEST (UTC+2)	Aronsson 15'; Berner (yellow card) 36'; Helldén (yellow card) 70' (yellow-red card) 115'; Sinani (yellow card) 77'; Hermansson 105'; Bengtsson 108' 112'; Andersson (yellow card) 110'; Henning 118'; Gustafsson 120+3'	Report	Sterner 85' (pen.); Abdi (yellow card) 88'; Hassan 93'	Stadium: Sörbyvallen 1 Attendance: 304; Referee: Honraw Ghassali

2 July 2022	Torns IF	2–1	BK Olympic	Stångby
13:00 CEST (UTC+2)	Hofvander 10'; Burehed 68'	Report	Norrby (yellow card) 70'; Frco 90'	Stadium: Tornvallen; Attendance: 157; Referee: Emil Persson

2 July 2022	Enköpings SK FK	1–0	IFK Uppsala	Enköping
14:00 CEST (UTC+2)	Lundemo 4' (yellow card) 45+1'; Persson Njie (yellow card) 70'; Barone (yellow card) 70'; Zetterström (yellow card) 78'	Report	Hawez (yellow card) 90+3' (yellow-red card) 90+9'; Aramesh (yellow card) 90+7'; Jalil (yellow card) 90+8'	Stadium: Enavallen A-plan; Attendance: 189; Referee: Martin Johansson Oberle

2 July 2022	FC Gute	1–1 (a.e.t.) (2–4 p)	IFK Haninge	Visby
14:00 CEST (UTC+2)	Östberg 60'	Report	Span 34' (pen.); Alpek (yellow card) 79'; Markulic (yellow card) 81'; Turan (yellow card) 90'; Ghafar (yellow card) 112'	Stadium: Gutavallen; Attendance: 300; Referee: Odai Alwani
	Penalties
	Eneqvist (penalty scored); Ogestad (penalty missed); Starkenberg (penalty missed); Pettersson Östlund (penalty scored)		Span (penalty scored); Jobarteh (penalty scored); Jemal (penalty scored); Lundgren (penalty scored)

2 July 2022	Skiljebo SK	1–2	Örebro Syrianska IF	Västerås
14:00 CEST (UTC+2)	Damberg 10'; Norlin (yellow card) 68'	Report	Yanez Hernandez 18' (pen.); Alp 63'; Lamu (yellow card) 74'	Stadium: Hamre 1 Attendance: 391; Referee: Patrik Larsson

2 July 2022	Västra Frölunda IF	6–0	Torslanda IK	Gothenburg
14:00 CEST (UTC+2)	Nyman 33' (pen.) 40' 80'; Hansson 52'; Ohman 57'; Furublad 72'	Report	Bäcklund (yellow card) 45'	Stadium: Ruddalen 1 Konstgräs; Referee: Danial Khosravi

2 July 2022	Angered BK	2–4	Ljungskile SK	Angered
14:00 CEST (UTC+2)	Hajrizaj 3'; Janneh (red card) 51'; Kocevski 60'; Sundgren (yellow card) 90+4'	Report	Odenbeck 9'; Conteh 25'; Janneh (yellow card) 50'; Akamatsu 52'; Lamin 65' (yellow card) 76'	Stadium: Hjällbovallen 1 Gräs; Referee: Petter Seger Undén

2 July 2022	IFK Simrishamn	0–4	Österlen FF	Simrishamn
14:00 CEST (UTC+2)		Report	Asaad 29'; Bjurnemark 40'; Legiec 81' 86'	Stadium: Korsavads IC A-plan; Attendance: 686; Referee: Christoffer Södergren

2 July 2022	IFK Österåker	2–1	Sollentuna FK	Åkersberga
16:00 CEST (UTC+2)	Johansson 25'; Donado (yellow card) 23' (goal) 75'; Makolli (yellow card) 90+2'	Report	Sandén 49'	Stadium: Österåkers Friidrottsarena; Attendance: 240; Referee: Jasin Holmegren

2 July 2022	Karlbergs BK	2–4 (a.e.t.)	Vasalunds IF	Karlberg
16:00 CEST (UTC+2)	Wiorek (yellow card) 69'; Sears 73'; Westerberg (yellow card) 79'; Bayram 85'; Wallberg (yellow card) 90'	Report	Ekvall (yellow card) 49'; Åsbrink 39'; Kabuye 43'; Ali (yellow card) 91'; Durmaz 110'; Jennani 118'	Stadium: Stadshagens IP 1 Referee: Nael Ghazi Shabo

2 July 2022	Huddinge IF	3 – 0 (awd)	Hammarby Talang FF	Huddinge
16:00 CEST (UTC+2)		Report		Stadium: Källbrinks IP 1

2 July 2022	Trosa-Vagnhärad SK	0–5	Nyköpings BIS	Vagnhärad
16:00 CEST (UTC+2)	Strömgren (red card) 33'; Greenfield (yellow card) 53'; Adam (yellow card) 53'; Hamo (yellow card) 81'	Report	Nordenberg 19' (pen.) (yellow card) 45' (goal) 71' 85'; Khalil 22'; Ahmetovic (yellow card) 53'; Bergfors (yellow card) 61'; Bergman (yellow card) 81' (yellow-red card) 87'; Hamo 90+2'	Stadium: Häradsvallen A Attendance: 53; Referee: Adli Assali

2 July 2022	Eneby BK	1–1 (a.e.t.) (2–3 p)	IK Sleipner	Norrköping
16:00 CEST (UTC+2)	Camargo (yellow card) 58'; Bijanzade 86'	Report	Qasem 24' (yellow card) 97'; Svensson (yellow card) 45' (red card) 105'; Lindell (yellow card) 76'; Johansson (yellow card) 85'; Zidaric (yellow card) 91'; Larsén (yellow card) 97'	Stadium: MAXIvallen Wembly; Attendance: 242; Referee: Teddy Dahlin
	Penalties
	Sandberg (penalty scored); Al-Ezzi (penalty missed); Kvrgic (penalty scored); Sjöblom Johansson (penalty missed); Bijanzade (penalty missed)		Jashari (penalty missed); Andersson (penalty scored); Lundgren (penalty scored); Hadziahmetovic (penalty scored)

2 July 2022	IK Tord	6–0	Assyriska FF	Jönköping
16:00 CEST (UTC+2)	Lyck 7' (pen.) 14' 38' 81'; Kiwarkis 26'; Aoun (yellow card) 30'; Sander 57'; Rygert (yellow card) 75'; Nygren (yellow card) 75'	Report	Ismael (yellow card) 40'; Karlsson (yellow card) 75'	Stadium: Rosenlunds IP 3 Referee: Fidan Hasani

2 July 2022	Hässleholms IF	1–0	Eskilsminne IF	Hässleholm
16:00 CEST (UTC+2)	Johnsson 70'; Larsson (yellow card) 90+4'; Henningsson (yellow card) 90+6'	Report	W Nilsson (yellow card) 45+3'; Getachew (yellow card) 59'; Mansour (yellow card) 63'; H Nilsson (yellow card) 90+6'	Stadium: Österås IP A-plan; Referee: Max Persson

2 July 2022	Älmhults IF	2–1	Asarums IF	Älmhult
16:00 CEST (UTC+2)	Johansson (yellow card) 26'; Lassen (yellow card) 30'; Mårtensson 53'; Jansson (yellow card) 60'; Nilsson (yellow card) 66'; Ejneborn 90+2'	Report	Svensson 14'; Olsson (yellow card) 77'; Ohnysson (yellow card) 81'	Stadium: Älmekulla 1 Attendance: 175; Referee: Stjepan Dodik

2 July 2022	Friska Viljor FC	1–2	Hudiksvalls FF	Örnsköldsvik
16:00 CEST (UTC+2)	Nasmark 58'; Siljander (yellow card) 87'; Backman (yellow card) 90+6'	Report	Ededal 14' 65'; Pärlenskog (yellow card) 85'	Stadium: Skyttis IP; Attendance: 255; Referee: Andreas Forsberg

2 July 2022	FC Arlanda	2–3	Täby FK	Märstam
17:00 CEST (UTC+2)	Ahmed 22' (yellow card) 60'; Khodakovskyi 45+1' (yellow card) 67'; Aslan (yellow card) 74'	Report	Ahlberg 7'; Unknown 68' (o.g.); Prtic (yellow card) 82'; Uppling 88'	Stadium: Midgårdsvallen Arena Naturgräs; Attendance: 69; Referee: Jesper Fredholm

3 July 2022	Räppe GOIF	2–4	Oskarshamns AIK	Växjö
14:00 CEST (UTC+2)	Muteba 56'; Ahrn 86'	Report	Masangane 2'; Stevens 20'; Sawo 39'; Jägerbrink (yellow card) 62' (goal) 79'	Stadium: Räppevallen 1 Referee: Barech Afzal Khan

3 July 2022	Lucksta IF	1–3	IFK Östersund	Lucksta
15:00 CEST (UTC+2)	Nassir 41'; Hamdan (yellow card) 53'	Report	Wikberg (yellow card) 14'; Häggman 52' 82'; Sundström 58'	Stadium: Sörforsvallen; Attendance: 136; Referee: Robert Ahlman

3 July 2022	IFK Luleå	2–1	Umeå FC	Luleå
16:00 CEST (UTC+2)	Ghidini 14'; Pettersen 42'	Report	Hamza (yellow card) 23'; Yeboah 23'; Embaye (yellow card) 90+2'	Stadium: Nyabvallen; Referee: Oskar Nilsson

24 July 2022	Nordvärmlands FF	0–4	IF Karlstad	Ambjörby
18:00 CEST (UTC+2)		Report	Alvers 42' 56'; Johannesson 45+3' 87'	Stadium: Nyvallen; Attendance: 250; Referee: Rasmus Ekelund

30 July 2022	IK Gauthiod	2–0	Lidköpings FK	Grästorp
13:00 CEST (UTC+2)	Enström (yellow card) 53'; Qeraj (yellow card) 63' (goal) 73'; Khajo 67'	Report	Hellman (yellow card) 14'; Gustavsson (yellow card) 86'; Stenström (yellow card) 87'	Stadium: Lunnevi IP A-plan; Attendance: 212; Referee: Daniel Särén

== Round 2 ==
64 teams compete in this round: 32 winners from Round 1 and the 32 teams from the 2022 Allsvenskan and 2022 Superettan.

30 August 2022	Älmhults IF	1–2	BK Häcken	Älmhult
17:00 CEST (UTC+2)	Thellson 3'	Report	Turgott 57'; Romeo 90'	Stadium: Älmekulla 1

30 August 2022	Huddinge IF	1–3	Degerfors IF	Huddinge
18:00 CEST (UTC+2)	Uddenberg 90+2'	Report	Djurdjic 18', 78'; Bouzaiene 27'	Stadium: Källbrinks IP 1

30 August 2022	GAIS	3–1	IFK Värnamo	Gothenburg
19:00 CEST (UTC+2)	Celik 90+5', 117'; Kargbo 107'	Report	Antonsson 85'	Stadium: Gamla Ullevi

31 August 2022	Onsala BK	3–1	Örgryte IS	Onsala
17:30 CEST (UTC+2)	Lindström 27'; Berntsson 36' (65)	Report	Johansson 43'	Stadium: Rydets IP

31 August 2022	IK Gauthiod	0–2	Trelleborgs FF	Grästorp
17:30 CEST (UTC+2)		Report	Jönsson 6'; Björkén 31'	Stadium: Lunnevi IP

31 August 2022	Brålanda IF	0–9	Malmö FF	Brålanda
18:00 CEST (UTC+2)		Report	Sejdiu 2', 10', 73'; Kiese 8'; Gall 19', 49', 82'; Rakip 40', 64'	Stadium: Sörbyvallen 1

31 August 2022	IK Tord	0–6	Helsingborgs IF	Jönköping
18:00 CEST (UTC+2)		Report	Muhsin 17', 45', 82', 89'; Rogne 26'; Ali 78' (pen.)	Stadium: Rosenlunds IP 3

31 August 2022	Ljungskile SK	0–4	Varbergs BoIS	Ljungskile
18:00 CEST (UTC+2)		Report	Bohman 17'; Kunst 23'; Stanisic 30'; Le Roux 55'	Stadium: Skarsjövallen

31 August 2022	Tvååkers IF	0–2	Kalmar FF	Tvååker
18:00 CEST (UTC+2)		Report	Bjerkebo 48', 90+3'	Stadium: Övrevi IP

31 August 2022	Hässleholms IF	0–2	Mjällby AIF	Hässleholm
18:00 CEST (UTC+2)		Report	Rosengren 48'; Johansson 53'	Stadium: Österås IP A-plan

31 August 2022	Torns IF	0–3	IFK Göteborg	Stångby
18:00 CEST (UTC+2)		Report	Markovic 24', 77'; Salomonsson 47' (pen.)	Stadium: Tornvallen

31 August 2022	Österlen FF	0–3	Landskrona BoIS	Skillinge
18:00 CEST (UTC+2)		Report	Wihlstrand 20'; 36' (o.g.); Diawara 90'	Stadium: Skillinge Idrottsplats

31 August 2022	IFK Stocksund	0–3	GIF Sundsvall	Danderyd
18:00 CEST (UTC+2)		Report	Ylätupa 23'; Lasso 51'; Olsson 57'	Stadium: Danderyd Arena

31 August 2022	Hudiksvalls FF	2–3	AIK	Hudiksvall
18:00 CEST (UTC+2)	Zerai 39'; Caselius 82'	Report	Bahoui 9'; Stefanelli 59'; Ring 68'; Larsson 73'	Stadium: Glysisvallen

31 August 2022	IFK Luleå	1–0	AFC Eskilstuna	Luleå
18:00 CEST (UTC+2)	Begliardi	Report		Stadium: Nyabvallen

31 August 2022	FC Trollhättan	1–0	Östers IF	Trollhättan
19:00 CEST (UTC+2)	Andersson 14'	Report		Stadium: Edsborgs IP A-plan

31 August 2022	Husqvarna FF	0–3	Halmstads BK	Huskvarna
19:00 CEST (UTC+2)		Report	Ahlstrand 28', 81'; Wikström 90+4'	Stadium: Vapenvallen

31 August 2022	Lunds BK	0–1	Norrby IF	Lund
19:00 CEST (UTC+2)		Report	Andersson 83'	Stadium: Klostergårdens IP

31 August 2022	IK Sleipner	0–2	IK Brage	Norrköping
19:00 CEST (UTC+2)		Report	Sjöberg 33'; Sietsjøe 42'	Stadium: PlatinumCars Arena

31 August 2022	Enköpings SK FK	1–4	Dalkurd FF	Enköping
19:00 CEST (UTC+2)	Zetterström 19'	Report	Abdulla 36', 76'; Montagna 57'; Saleh Karim 61'	Stadium: Enavallen A-plan

31 August 2022	IFK Haninge	1–3	IF Brommapojkarna	Haninge
19:00 CEST (UTC+2)	Kamnelius 56'	Report	Maripuu 7'; Pettersson 8'; Leach Holm 18'	Stadium: Torvalla IP

31 August 2022	Stockholm Internazionale	0–2	Skövde AIK	Stockholm
19:00 CEST (UTC+2)		Report	Lindell 116'; Granath 120'	Stadium: Kristinebergs IP

31 August 2022	Vasalunds IF	0–1	Örebro SK	Solna
19:00 CEST (UTC+2)		Report	Seger 57'	Stadium: Skytteholms IP

31 August 2022	IFK Östersund	0–1	Östersunds FK	Östersund
19:00 CEST (UTC+2)		Report	Karlsson 34'	Stadium: Jämtkraft Arena

31 August 2022	IF Karlstad	1–3	Västerås SK	Karlstad
19:00 CEST (UTC+2)	Haidar 30'	Report	Jajić 44', 89' (pen.); Prodell 65'	Stadium: Tingvalla IP

31 August 2022	IFK Österåker	0–3	Jönköpings Södra IF	Åkersberga
19:30 CEST (UTC+2)		Report	Edqvist 27'; Hamidović 44' (pen.); Book 72'	Stadium: Österåkers Friidrottsarena

1 September 2022	Täby FK	0–2	IFK Norrköping	Täby
17:00 CEST (UTC+2)		Report	Sema 14'; Sigurðsson 50'	Stadium: Tibblevallen

1 September 2022	Nyköpings BIS	1–2	Hammarby IF	Nyköping
17:00 CEST (UTC+2)	E Ahmetovic 77'	Report	Fenger 8'; A Ahmetovic 53' (o.g.)	Stadium: Rosvalla IP

1 September 2022	Oskarshamns AIK	1–0	IF Elfsborg	Oskarshamn
18:00 CEST (UTC+2)	Masangane 27'	Report		Stadium: Arena Oskarshamn

1 September 2022	Västra Frölunda IF	1–2	Utsiktens BK	Gothenburg
19:00 CEST (UTC+2)		Report		Stadium: Ruddalen 1 Konstgräs

1 September 2022	Sandvikens IF	0–2	IK Sirius	Sandviken
19:00 CEST (UTC+2)		Report	Kouakou 73'; 79' (o.g.)	Stadium: Jernvallen

1 September 2022	Örebro Syrianska IF	0–3	Djurgårdens IF	Örebro
19:00 CEST (UTC+2)		Report	Garcia Tsotidis 34'; Šabović 78' (pen.); Andersson 82' (pen.)	Stadium: Behrn Arena; Attendance: 2,235

== Group stage ==
The 32 winners from round 2 were divided into eight groups of four teams. The 16 highest ranked winners from the previous rounds were seeded to the top two positions in each group and the 16 remaining winners went unseeded in the draw. The ranking of the 16 seeded teams was decided by league position in the 2022 season. All teams in the group stage played each other once, the highest-ranked teams from the previous rounds and teams from tier three or lower played two home matches.

=== Qualified teams ===
Seeded

- AIK (1)
- BK Häcken (1)
- Degerfors IF (1)
- Djurgårdens IF (1)
- GIF Sundsvall (1)
- Hammarby IF (1)
- Helsingborgs IF (1)
- IFK Göteborg (1)
- IFK Norrköping (1)
- IK Sirius (1)
- Kalmar FF (1)
- Malmö FF (1)
- Mjällby AIF (1)
- Varbergs BoIS (1)
- Halmstads BK (2)
- IF Brommapojkarna (2)

Unseeded

- Dalkurd FF (2)
- IK Brage (2)
- Jönköpings Södra IF (2)
- Landskrona BoIS (2)
- Norrby IF (2)
- Skövde AIK (2)
- Trelleborgs FF (2)
- Utsiktens BK (2)
- Västerås SK (2)
- Örebro SK (2)
- Östersunds FK (2)
- FC Trollhättan (3)
- GAIS (3)
- Oskarshamns AIK (3)
- IFK Luleå (4)
- Onsala BK (4)

=== Group 1 ===
Pos	Team	Pld	W	D	L	GF	GA	GD	Pts	Qualification	BKH	HBK	FCT	JÖN
1	BK Häcken	3	3	0	0	13	2	+11	9	Advance to Knockout Stage		2–1		5–0
2	Halmstads BK	3	2	0	1	5	3	+2	6					3–1
3	FC Trollhättan	3	1	0	2	2	7	−5	3		1–6	0–1		
4	Jönköpings Södra IF	3	0	0	3	1	9	−8	0				0–1	

Rules for classification: 1) Points; 2) Goal difference; 3) Goals scored; 4) Head-to-head record; 5) Lowest disciplinary points; 6) Highest ranked team

18 February 2023 Matchday 1	BK Häcken	5–0	Jönköpings Södra IF	Gothenburg
13:00	Rygaard 3'; Simon Gustafson 59'; Sonko 61'; Hovland 64'; Traoré 84'	Report	Abdulla (yellow card) 22'; Moënza (yellow card) 54'; Adrian (yellow card) 72'	Stadium: Bravida Arena; Attendance: 1,392; Referee: Joakim Östling

18 February 2023 Matchday 1	FC Trollhättan	0–1	Halmstads BK	Trollhättan
13:00		Report	Andreas Johansson (yellow card) 37'; Hjertstrand 45+3' (yellow card) 56'; Viktor Granath (yellow card) 68'; Ahlstrand (yellow card) 90'	Stadium: Edsborgs IP; Attendance: 477; Referee: Magnus Lindgren

25 February 2023 Matchday 2	FC Trollhättan	1–6	BK Häcken	Trollhättan
13:00	Aliev 42'	Report	Sonko 26'; Sadiq 38' 58' 77'; Rygaard 41'; Olden Larsen 69'; Hovland (yellow card) 85'	Stadium: Edsborgs IP; Attendance: 851; Referee: Kaspar Sjöberg

25 February 2023 Matchday 2	Halmstads BK	3–1	Jönköpings Södra IF	Halmstad
13:00	Ahlstrand 43'; Alexander Johansson 50'; Baffoe (yellow card) 57'; Granath (yellow card) 85'; Mohammed 88'	Report	Dzelili 28' (yellow card) 57'; Adrian (yellow card) 31'	Stadium: Örjans Vall; Referee: Rinon Hasani

4 March 2023 Matchday 3	Jönköpings Södra IF	0–1	FC Trollhättan	Jönköping
15:15		Report		Stadium: Stadsparksvallen

4 March 2023 Matchday 3	BK Häcken	2–1	Halmstads BK	Gothenburg
15:15		Report		Stadium: Bravida Arena

=== Group 2 ===
Pos	Team	Pld	W	D	L	GF	GA	GD	Pts	Qualification	DIF	ÖRE	LAN	IBP
1	Djurgårdens IF	3	3	0	0	10	3	+7	9	Advance to Knockout Stage			6–1	2–1
2	Örebro SK	3	2	0	1	5	3	+2	6		1–2			
3	Landskrona BoIS	3	1	0	2	4	10	−6	3			0–2		
4	IF Brommapojkarna	3	0	0	3	4	7	−3	0			1–2	2–3	

Updated to match(es) played on unknown. Source:
Rules for classification: 1) Points; 2) Goal difference; 3) Goals scored; 4) Head-to-head record; 5) Lowest disciplinary points; 6) Highest ranked team

20 February 2023 Matchday 1	Djurgårdens IF	6–1	Landskrona BoIS	Stockholm
18:30	Wikheim 12'; Andersson 27'; Asoro 45+2'; Berg 49'; Šabović 79'; L Bergvall 90+2'	Report	Edvardsson (yellow card) 22'; Diawara (yellow card) 41' (goal) 86'; Dahlqvist (yellow card) 89'; Tkacz (yellow card) 89'	Stadium: Tele2 Arena; Attendance: 8,762; Referee: Adam Ladebäck

20 February 2023 Matchday 1	IF Brommapojkarna	1–2	Örebro SK	Vällingby
18:30	Jelassi (yellow card) 77'; Omorowa (yellow card) 89' (goal) 90+4'	Report	Milleskog 19'; Seger 56' (yellow card) 72'; Dahl (yellow card) 80'	Stadium: Grimsta IP; Attendance: 288; Referee: Oscar Johnson

26 February 2023 Matchday 2	Örebro SK	1–2	Djurgårdens IF	Örebro
17:30	Noel Milleskog 53'	Report	Wikheim 7'; Johansson 90+1'	Stadium: Behrn Arena; Attendance: 3,604; Referee: Mohammed Al-Hakim

26 February 2023 Matchday 2	IF Brommapojkarna	2–3	Landskrona BoIS	Vällingby
17:30	Oscar Pettersson 28'; Vasic (yellow card) 52' (goal) 84'	Report	Diawara 4'; Edvardsson (yellow card) 40'; Widell 57' 74'; Hedenquist (yellow card) 90+4'	Stadium: Grimsta IP; Attendance: 108; Referee: Adam Ladebäck

4 March 2023 Matchday 3	Landskrona BoIS	0–2	Örebro SK	Landskrona
13:00		Report		Stadium: Landskrona IP

4 March 2023 Matchday 3	Djurgårdens IF	2–1	IF Brommapojkarna	Stockholm
13:00		Report		Stadium: Tele2 Arena

=== Group 3 ===
Pos	Team	Pld	W	D	L	GF	GA	GD	Pts	Qualification	HIF	IKB	NOR	GIF
1	Hammarby IF	3	3	0	0	15	1	+14	9	Advance to Knockout Stage		4–1		8–0
2	IK Brage	3	2	0	1	8	4	+4	6				5–0	
3	Norrby IF	3	0	1	2	1	9	−8	1		0–3			
4	GIF Sundsvall	3	0	1	2	1	11	−10	1			0–2	1–1	

Rules for classification: 1) Points; 2) Goal difference; 3) Goals scored; 4) Head-to-head record; 5) Lowest disciplinary points; 6) Highest ranked team

19 February 2023 Matchday 1	Hammarby IF	4–1	IK Brage	Stockholm
17:30	Besara 34' 85'; Kurtulus (yellow card) 45+1'; Pinas (yellow card) 50'; Erabi 89'; Madjed 90+1'	Report	Rödin (yellow card) 41'; Zetterström (yellow card) 64'; Izountouemoi (yellow card) 64'; Sjöberg 90+4'	Stadium: Tele2 Arena; Attendance: 19,011; Referee: Mohammed Al-Hakim

19 February 2023 Matchday 1	GIF Sundsvall	1–1	Norrby IF	Sundsvall
17:30	Forsberg (yellow card) 22'; Nåvik 43'; Stenshagen (yellow card) 79'	Report	Atola 49'	Stadium: NP3 Arena; Attendance: 500; Referee: Martin Strömbergsson

25 February 2023 Matchday 2	Norrby IF	0–3	Hammarby IF	Borås
13:00	Helge (yellow card) 10'; Svendsén (yellow card) 18'; Pärleholt (yellow card) 49'; Atola (yellow card) 81'	Report	Erabi 6' 69'; Đukanović 58'	Stadium: Borås Arena; Attendance: 1,423; Referee: Fredrik Klitte

25 February 2023 Matchday 2	GIF Sundsvall	0–2	IK Brage	Sundsvall
13:00	Shino (yellow card) 70'; Andersson (yellow card) 90+1'	Report	Arvidsson (yellow card) 10' (goal) 45'; Izountouemoi (yellow card) 17'; Nyarko 55'; Berggren (yellow card) 62'; Tot Wikström (yellow card) 90+2'	Stadium: NP3 Arena; Attendance: 350; Referee: Erik Mattsson

5 March 2023 Matchday 3	IK Brage	5–0	Norrby IF	Borlänge
17:30		Report		Stadium: Domnarvsvallen

5 March 2023 Matchday 3	Hammarby IF	8–0	GIF Sundsvall	Stockholm
17:30		Report		Stadium: Tele2 Arena

=== Group 4 ===
Pos	Team	Pld	W	D	L	GF	GA	GD	Pts	Qualification	KFF	TFF	HIF	ONS
1	Kalmar FF	3	3	0	0	10	3	+7	9	Advance to Knockout Stage		3–2	4–1	
2	Trelleborgs FF	3	2	0	1	6	4	+2	6					1–0
3	Helsingborgs IF	3	1	0	2	7	7	0	3			1–3		
4	Onsala BK	3	0	0	3	0	9	−9	0		0–3		0–5	

Rules for classification: 1) Points; 2) Goal difference; 3) Goals scored; 4) Head-to-head record; 5) Lowest disciplinary points; 6) Highest ranked team

18 February 2023 Matchday 1	Onsala BK	0–5	Helsingborgs IF	Onsala
13:00		Report	Jönsson 3'; Suljić 12'; Loeper 22'; Muhsin 84' 88'	Stadium: Rydets IP; Referee: Andreas Ekberg

19 February 2023 Matchday 1	Kalmar FF	3–2	Trelleborgs FF	Kalmar
15:00	Karlsson 32'; Skrabb 43'; Rajovic 58'; Sætra (yellow card) 89'	Report	Saeid 39' 77'; Hörberg (yellow card) 90+3'; Viitikko (yellow card) 90+3'	Stadium: Guldfågeln Arena; Attendance: 1,037; Referee: Fredrik Klitte

26 February 2023 Matchday 2	Onsala BK	0–3	Kalmar FF	Onsala
13:00	Berntsson (yellow card) 21'; Fogelblad (yellow card) 43'; Jarnvik (yellow card) 72'; Levinson (yellow card) 87'	Report	Jensen 25'; Ólafsson (yellow card) 33'; Rajovic (yellow card) 58' (goal) 75'; Bjerkebo 87'	Stadium: Rydets IP; Attendance: 509; Referee: Fredrik Oppong

26 February 2023 Matchday 2	Helsingborgs IF	1–3	Trelleborgs FF	Helsingborg
13:00	Rejnhold (yellow card) 35'; Jönsson 55'; Hellborg (yellow card) 90'	Report	Mortensen 15' 29'; Hörberg (yellow card) 38'; Saeid (yellow card) 43'; Offia 90+4'	Stadium: Olympia; Referee: Adi Aganovic

5 March 2023 Matchday 3	Trelleborgs FF	1–0	Onsala BK	Trelleborg
13:00		Report		Stadium: Vångavallen

5 March 2023 Matchday 3	Kalmar FF	4–1	Helsingborgs IF	Kalmar
13:00		Report		Stadium: Guldfågeln Arena

=== Group 5 ===
Pos	Team	Pld	W	D	L	GF	GA	GD	Pts	Qualification	AIK	VÄS	VAR	ÖST
1	AIK	3	2	1	0	7	1	+6	7	Advance to Knockout Stage		1–1	3–0	
2	Västerås SK FK	3	1	2	0	5	3	+2	5					2–2
3	Varbergs BoIS	3	1	0	2	1	5	−4	3			0–2		1–0
4	Östersunds FK	3	0	1	2	2	6	−4	1		0–3			

Updated to match(es) played on unknown. Source:
Rules for classification: 1) Points; 2) Goal difference; 3) Goals scored; 4) Head-to-head record; 5) Lowest disciplinary points; 6) Highest ranked team

18 February 2023 Matchday 1	Varbergs BoIS	1–0	Östersunds FK	Varberg
15:00	Junior 59'	Report		Stadium: Varberg Energi Arena; Attendance: 317; Referee: Kaspar Sjöberg

18 February 2023 Matchday 1	AIK	1–1	Västerås SK FK	Stockholm
15:15	Faraj 16'	Report	Johansson 7'	Stadium: Tele2 Arena; Attendance: 13,008; Referee: Granit Maqedonci

26 February 2023 Matchday 2	Varbergs BoIS	0–2	Västerås SK FK	Varberg
15:00		Report		Stadium: Varberg Energi Arena

26 February 2023 Matchday 2	Östersunds FK	0–3	AIK	Östersund
15:15		Report	Guidetti 11' (pen.); Fischer 59', 62'	Stadium: Jämtkraft Arena; Attendance: 2,042; Referee: Enzo Vesprini

6 March 2023 Matchday 3	Västerås SK FK	2–2	Östersunds FK	Västerås
19:00		Report		Stadium: Iver Arena

6 March 2023 Matchday 3	AIK	3–0	Varbergs BoIS	Solna
19:00	Hussein 2'; Haliti 60'; Guidetti 81'	Report		Stadium: Skytteholms IP; Attendance: 3,355; Referee: Bojan Pandžić

=== Group 6 ===
Pos	Team	Pld	W	D	L	GF	GA	GD	Pts	Qualification	MFF	DEG	SKÖ	LUL
1	Malmö FF	3	3	0	0	5	1	+4	9	Advance to Knockout Stage		2–1	2–0	
2	Degerfors IF	3	2	0	1	4	2	+2	6				1–0	
3	Skövde AIK	3	1	0	2	3	4	−1	3					3–1
4	IFK Luleå	3	0	0	3	1	6	−5	0		0–1	0–2		

Rules for classification: 1) Points; 2) Goal difference; 3) Goals scored; 4) Head-to-head record; 5) Lowest disciplinary points; 6) Highest ranked team

19 February 2023 Matchday 1	Malmö FF	2–0	Skövde AIK	Malmö
13:00		Report		Stadium: Malmö IP

19 February 2023 Matchday 1	IFK Luleå	0–2	Degerfors IF	Luleå
13:00		Report		Stadium: Arcushallen

27 February 2023 Matchday 2	IFK Luleå	0–1	Malmö FF	Luleå
18:30		Report		Stadium: Arcushallen

27 February 2023 Matchday 2	Degerfors IF	1–0	Skövde AIK	Degerfors
18:30		Report		Stadium: Stora Valla

5 March 2023 Matchday 3	Skövde AIK	3–1	IFK Luleå	Skövde
13:00		Report		Stadium: Södermalms IP

5 March 2023 Matchday 3	Malmö FF	2–1	Degerfors IF	Malmö
13:00		Report		Stadium: Malmö IP

=== Group 7 ===
Pos	Team	Pld	W	D	L	GF	GA	GD	Pts	Qualification	IFKN	GAIS	IFKG	UBK
1	IFK Norrköping	3	2	1	0	8	3	+5	7	Advance to Knockout stage				3–3
2	GAIS	3	2	0	1	4	2	+2	6		0–1		2–1	
3	IFK Göteborg	3	1	0	2	4	8	−4	3		0–4			3–2
4	Utsiktens BK	3	0	1	2	5	8	−3	1			0–2		

Source: SvFF
Rules for classification: 1) Points; 2) Goal difference; 3) Goals scored; 4) Head-to-head record; 5) Lowest disciplinary points; 6) Highest ranked team

18 February 2023 Matchday 1	IFK Göteborg	3–2	Utsiktens BK	Gothenburg
13:00		Report		Stadium: Gamla Ullevi

19 February 2023 Matchday 1	GAIS	0–1	IFK Norrköping	Gothenburg
15:15		Report		Stadium: Gamla Ullevi

26 February 2023 Matchday 2	GAIS	2–1	IFK Göteborg	Gothenburg
13:00		Report		Stadium: Gamla Ullevi

26 February 2023 Matchday 2	IFK Norrköping	3–3	Utsiktens BK	Norrköping
13:00		Report		Stadium: PlatinumCars Arena

5 March 2023 Matchday 3	Utsiktens BK	0–2	GAIS	Gothenburg
15:15		Report		Stadium: Bravida Arena

5 March 2023 Matchday 3	IFK Göteborg	0–4	IFK Norrköping	Gothenburg
15:15		Report		Stadium: Gamla Ullevi

=== Group 8 ===
Pos	Team	Pld	W	D	L	GF	GA	GD	Pts	Qualification	MAIF	IKS	DFF	OSK
1	Mjällby AIF	3	3	0	0	6	3	+3	9	Advance to Knockout Stage		3–2	1–0	
2	IK Sirius	3	2	0	1	10	4	+6	6				4–0	
3	Dalkurd FF	3	1	0	2	5	7	−2	3					5–2
4	Oskarshamns AIK	3	0	0	3	4	11	−7	0		1–2	1–4		

Rules for classification: 1) Points; 2) Goal difference; 3) Goals scored; 4) Head-to-head record; 5) Lowest disciplinary points; 6) Highest ranked team

19 February 2023 Matchday 1	Mjällby AIF	1–0	Dalkurd FF	Hällevik
13:00		Report		Stadium: Strandvallen

19 February 2023 Matchday 1	Oskarshamns AIK	1–4	IK Sirius	Oskarshamn
13:00		Report		Stadium: Arena Oskarshamn

25 February 2023 Matchday 2	Oskarshamns AIK	1–2	Mjällby AIF	Oskarshamn
15:00		Report		Stadium: Arena Oskarshamn

25 February 2023 Matchday 2	IK Sirius	4–0	Dalkurd FF	Uppsala
15:15		Report		Stadium: Studenternas IP

4 March 2023 Matchday 3	Dalkurd FF	5–2	Oskarshamns AIK	Uppsala
13:00		Report		Stadium: Studenternas IP

4 March 2023 Matchday 3	Mjällby AIF	3–2	IK Sirius	Hällevik
13:00		Report		Stadium: Strandvallen

== Knockout stage ==
The draw for the quarter-finals and semi-finals will be made on March 6, 2023.

=== Qualified teams ===
Pos	Grp	Team	Pld	W	D	L	GF	GA	GD	Pts	Qualification
1	3	Hammarby IF	3	3	0	0	15	1	+14	9	Seeded in Quarter-final draw
2	1	BK Häcken	3	3	0	0	13	2	+11	9	Seeded in Quarter-final draw
3	2	Djurgårdens IF	3	3	0	0	10	3	+7	9	Seeded in Quarter-final draw
4	4	Kalmar FF	3	3	0	0	10	3	+7	9	Seeded in Quarter-final draw
5	6	Malmö FF	3	3	0	0	5	1	+4	9	Unseeded in Quarter-final draw
6	8	Mjällby AIF	3	3	0	0	6	3	+3	9	Unseeded in Quarter-final draw
7	5	AIK	3	2	1	0	7	1	+6	7	Unseeded in Quarter-final draw
8	7	IFK Norrköping	3	2	1	0	8	3	+5	7	Unseeded in Quarter-final draw

Source: Group results
Rules for classification: 1) Points; 2) Goal difference; 3) Goals scored; 4) Ranking in 2022 season

=== Bracket ===
Quarter-finals
12 March 2023 – Kalmar
Kalmar FF	0 (4)
Mjällby AIF (p)	0 (5)
13 March 2023 – Stockholm
Hammarby	2
AIK	1
11 March 2023 – Gothenburg
BK Häcken	3
IFK Norrköping	0
12 March 2023 – Stockholm
Djurgårdens IF (p)	2 (5)
Malmö FF	2 (3)

Semi-finals
18 March 2023 – Hällevik
Mjällby AIF	1
Hammarby	0
19 March 2023 – Gothenburg
BK Häcken	3
Djurgårdens IF	0

Final
18 May 2023 – Hällevik
Mjällby AIF	1
BK Häcken	4

=== Quarter-finals ===
11 March 2023 Quarter-final	BK Häcken	3–0	IFK Norrköping	Gothenburg
16:00	Gustafson 44' (pen.); Larsen 78'; Sonko 83'	Report		Stadium: Bravida Arena; Attendance: 2,079; Referee: Frederik Klitte

12 March 2023 Quarter-final	Kalmar FF	0–0 (a.e.t.) (4–5 p)	Mjällby AIF	Kalmar
13:00		Report		Stadium: Gasten IP; Attendance: 1,578; Referee: Joakim Östling
	Penalties
	Rajovic (penalty scored); Sætra (penalty scored); Gustafsson (penalty scored); Gojani (penalty scored); Romário (penalty missed); Shamoun (penalty missed)		(penalty scored) Rösler; (penalty missed) Pettersson; (penalty scored) Ståhl; (penalty scored) Rosengren; (penalty scored) Eile; (penalty scored) Kričak

12 March 2023 Quarter-final	Djurgårdens IF	2–2 (a.e.t.) (5–3 p)	Malmö FF	Stockholm
16:00	Andersson 86'; Finndell 120'	Report	Christiansen 10', 114'	Stadium: Tele2 Arena; Attendance: 13,752; Referee: Adam Ladebäck
	Penalties
	Danielson (penalty scored); Berg (penalty scored); Asoro (penalty scored); Löfgren (penalty scored); Šabović (penalty scored)		(penalty missed) Thelin; (penalty scored) Nielsen; (penalty scored) Christiansen; (penalty scored) Olsson

13 March 2023 Quarter-final	Hammarby	2–1	AIK	Stockholm
19:00	Kurtulus 21'; Erabi 47'	Report	Guidetti 45+1'	Stadium: Tele2 Arena; Attendance: 28,279; Referee: Mohammed Al Hakim

=== Semi-finals ===
18 March 2023 Semi-final	Mjällby AIF	1–0	Hammarby	Hällevik
15:00	A. Johansson 38'	Report		Stadium: Strandvallen; Attendance: 3,233; Referee: Andreas Ekberg

19 March 2023 Semi-final	BK Häcken	3–0	Djurgårdens IF	Gothenburg
15:00	Larsen 34'; Sadiq 36', 59'	Report		Stadium: Bravida Arena; Attendance: 4,168; Referee: Glenn Nyberg

=== Final ===
18 May 2023 Final	Mjällby AIF	1–4	BK Häcken	Hällevik
15:00	Hammar (o.g.)		Sadiq 45+1', 45+4'; Rygaard 48'; Gustafson 66'	Stadium: Strandvallen

== Top scorers ==
Rank	Player	Club	Goals
1	(Sweden) Linus Lyck	IK Tord	4
1	(Iraq) Amar Muhsin	Helsingborgs IF	4
3	(Sweden) David Berntsson	Onsala BK	3
3	(United States) Romain Gall	Malmö FF	3
3	(Sweden) Trimi Makolli	FC Stockholm Internazionale	3
3	(Sweden) Pontus Nordenberg	Nykopings BIS	3
3	(Sweden) Paul Nyman	Västra Frölunda IF	3
3	(Kosovo) Patriot Sejdiu	Malmö FF	3
