= Brålanda IF =

Swedish football club

- Full name: Brålanda Idrottsförening
- Founded: 1909; 117 years ago
- Ground: Sörbyvallen, Brålanda
- Chairman: Stefan Lindqvist
- Head coach: Robin Johansson
Home colours

Brålanda Idrottsförening, commonly known as Brålanda IF, is a football club located in Brålanda, Sweden. Founded in 1909, the club now plays its home games on Sörbyvallen.

== History ==
Brålanda IF was founded in 1909.

In 2021, the club managed to reach the fifth tier, to play in the 2022 Division 3. In the 2022–23 Svenska Cupen, Brålanda IF was drawn against reigning league champions Malmö FF. Brålanda IF lost 0–9.

In February 2025, Brålanda IF withdrew from its 2025 league, the Division 4 Bohuslän/Dal. Instead, they fielded a team in eight-tier Division 6.
