= Momodou Sonko =

Swedish footballer (born 2005)

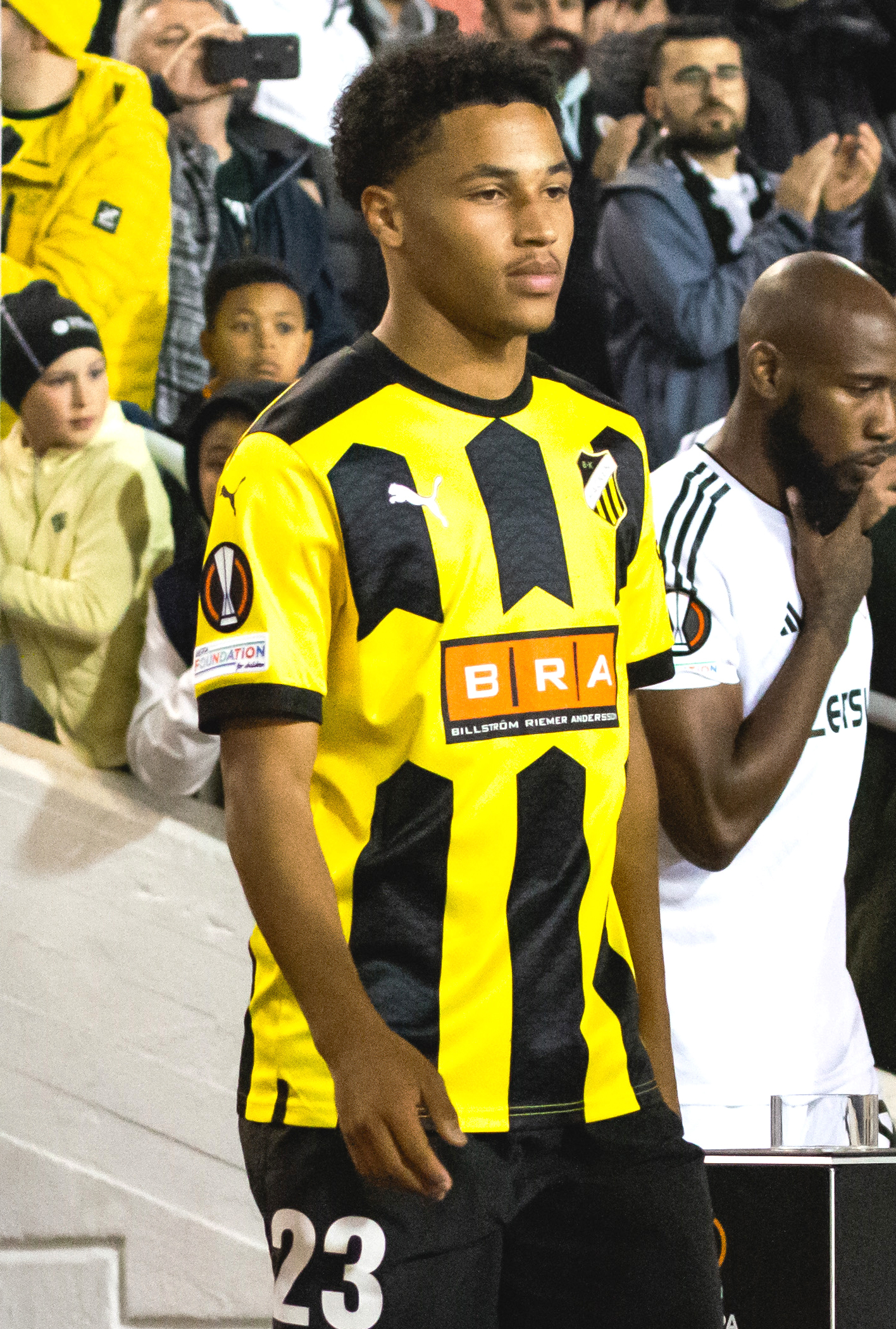

Personal information
- Full name: Momodou Lamin Sonko
- Date of birth: 31 January 2005 (age 21)
- Place of birth: Gothenburg, Sweden
- Height: 1.73 m (5 ft 8 in)
- Position: Forward

Team information
- Current team: Gent
- Number: 11

Youth career
- –2019: Västra Frölunda IF
- 2020–2022: BK Häcken

Senior career*
Years	Team	Apps	(Gls)
2022–2024	BK Häcken	25	(7)
2024–	Gent	73	(5)

International career^{‡}
2021–2022	Sweden U17	6	(0)
2022–2023	Sweden U19	8	(2)
2024–2026	Sweden U21	15	(3)
- * Club domestic league appearances and goals as of 25 October 2026 ‡ National team caps and goals as of 17:43, 1 April 2026 (UTC)

Momodou Lamin Sonko (born 31 January 2005) is a Swedish professional footballer who plays for Belgian club Gent as a forward.

== Club career ==
Momodou Sonko played with Västra Frölunda in Gothenburg, before moving to BK Häcken in 2020. There he quickly appeared as one of the most promising youth players of the club.

Sonko signed his first long-term professional contract with the Allsvenskan club in May 2022. His professional debut for Häcken followed on the 30 August 2022, starting in a 2–1 Cup victory against Älmhult.

He made his Allsvenskan debut on 2 October 2022, replacing Erik Friberg during a 1–1 away draw to Varbergs BoIS.

At the end of the season he was fully promoted to the first team, after he helped them win their first ever national championship.

He took the spotlight right at the start of the 2023 season, scoring a goal and delivering an assist, as he started a 5–0 win home Cup win to Jönköpings Södra.

On 29 January 2024, two days before his 19th birthday, Momodou signed a contract at KAA Gent until 2028. He broke the club's record transfer spending with a fee of around 8 million euro.

== International career ==
Born in Sweden, Sonko is of Gambian descent. He is a youth international for Sweden, having played with the under-17 and under-18 selections.

In June 2025 he was selected for the senior Sweden squad for friendly matches against Hungary and Algeria on 6 and 10 June 2025, respectively.

== Career statistics ==
As of match played 25 October 2026

Appearances and goals by club, season and competition
Club	Season	League			National Cup (Note: Includes Svenska Cupen)		League Cup		Europe		Other		Total	
Club	Season	Division	Apps	Goals	Apps	Goals	Apps	Goals	Apps	Goals	Apps	Goals	Apps	Goals
BK Häcken	2022	Allsvenskan	2	0	7	3	—		—		—		9	3
BK Häcken	2023	Allsvenskan	23	7	1	1	—		12 (Note: Eight appearances in UEFA Europa League and four appearances in UEFA Champions League)	3	—		36	11
BK Häcken	Total		25	7	8	4	—		12	3	—		45	14
Gent	2023–24	Belgian Pro League	7	0	0	0	—		2 (Note: Appearances in UEFA Conference League)	0	—		9	0
Gent	2024–25	Belgian Pro League	30	2	2	0	—		8	0	—		40	2
Gent	2025–26	Belgian Pro League	27	0	2	0	—		—		—		29	0
Gent	2026–27	Belgian Pro League	9	3	1	0	—		7	0	—		17	3
Gent	Total		73	5	5	0	—		17	0	—		95	5
Career total			98	12	13	4	0	0	29	3	0	0	140	19

== Honours ==
BK Häcken

- Allsvenskan: 2022
- Svenska Cupen: 2022–23

Individual

- Allsvenskan Young Player of the Year: 2023
