= Torns IF =

- Full name: Torns Idrottsförening
- Founded: 1965
- Ground: Tornvallen; Stångby; Lund; Sweden
- Chairman: Arman Momeni
- Coach: Richard Ringhov / Alexander Ekström / Robin Lindroos
- League: Ettan Södra
- 2024: Ettan Södra, 14th (relegated)
- Website: tornsif.se
Home colours	Away colours

Torns IF is a Swedish football club located in Stångby, an urban area in Lund Municipality in Skåne County.

== Background ==
Torns Idrottsförening was formed in 1965 and is based in Stångby, a town just north of the city of Lund. Torns IF is an expanding club with football as its primary focus. Currently around 350 children and youths play football for the club, and they are primarily from Stångby, Vallkärra, and the northern parts of the city of Lund.

Since 1983 the club has operated its own full-sized indoor hall and cafeteria, Tornhallen. The Stångby Fair is arranged by Torns IF every autumn with arts and crafts exhibitors in Tornhallen. For 30 years (1983–2012) Torns IF arranged the Torn indoor tournament for girls and boys from age 7 to seniors and veterans during weekends from October to February.

The club celebrated 50 years in 2015 and a book covering the history of the club was written.

Torns IF has participated mainly in the lower and middle divisions of the Swedish football league system. In the 2018 season the club plays in Division 1 Södra, which is at the third tier of Swedish football. The home matches are played at Tornvallen, Stångby in Lund Municipality.

Torns IF is affiliated to Skånes Fotbollförbund.

Torns IF gained international attention in 2023 by demonstrating a creative "scoop pass" trick that exploited the offside rule using the ball balanced on a player's foot, prompting debate over the rule's interpretation. After discussions with IFAB and viral interest, the offside law was officially amended for the 2025–26 season, with Torns IF proudly claiming credit for influencing the change.

== Season-to-season ==
Season	Level	Division	Section	Position	Movements
2020	Tier 3	Division 1	Södra		
2019	Tier 3	Division 1	Södra	12th	
2018	Tier 3	Division 1	Södra	5th	
2017	Tier 4	Division 2	Östra Götaland	1st	Promoted
2016	Tier 4	Division 2	Södra Götaland	3rd	
2015	Tier 4	Division 2	Södra Götaland	8th	
2014	Tier 4	Division 2	Västra Götaland	3rd	
2013	Tier 4	Division 2	Södra Götaland	3rd	
2012	Tier 4	Division 2	Södra Götaland	4th	
2011	Tier 5	Division 3	Södra Götaland	1st	Promoted
2010	Tier 6	Division 4	Skåne Sydvästra	1st	Promoted
2009	Tier 6	Division 4	Skåne Södra	4th	
2008	Tier 6	Division 4	Skåne Västra	4th	
2007	Tier 7	Division 5	Skåne Mellersta	1st	Promoted
2006*	Tier 7	Division 5	Skåne Mellersta	8th	
2005	Tier 6	Division 5	Skåne Mellersta	6th	
2004	Tier 6	Division 5	Skåne Mellersta	6th	
2003	Tier 7	Division 6	Skåne Mellersta	3rd	Promotion Playoffs – Promoted
2002	Tier 8	Division 7	Skåne Sydvästra C	3rd	Promotion Playoffs – Promoted
2001	Tier 8	Division 7	Skåne Mellersta B	5th	
2000	Tier 7	Division 6	Skåne Mellersta	11th	Relegated
1999	Tier 7	Division 6	Skåne Mellersta A	7th	

* League restructuring in 2006 resulted in a new division being created at Tier 2 and subsequent divisions dropping a level.
League tables since 2002 are available by choosing season on the webpage of the Swedish Football Association.
Seasons until 2014 are described in the book Torns IF - 50 years.

== Current squad ==
As of 10 February 2025

Note: Flags indicate national team as defined under FIFA eligibility rules; some limited exceptions apply. Players may hold more than one non-FIFA nationality.

No.	Pos.	Nation	Player
1	GK	SWE	Jakob Eggert
2	DF	SWE	Oskar Jönsson
5	DF	SWE	Noah Cavander (on loan from Trelleborg)
6	MF	SWE	Jesper Edlund
9	FW	SWE	Adrian Kozic Löfqvist
14	MF	SWE	Jonathan Jacobsson
15	FW	SWE	Alvin Holmgren
16	DF	SWE	Axel Wingberg

No.	Pos.	Nation	Player
20	MF	SWE	Mirza Halvadzic
23	DF	SWE	Ryan Kukoyi
24	FW	IRL	Abimbola Obasoto
27	MF	NOR	Jens Johansen
32	MF	SWE	Neo Andersson
33	MF	SWE	Hugo Brannefalk
—	DF	DEN	Nikodem Kowalski
—	MF	SWE	Andi Zejnullahu

== Notable players ==
- Oskar Rönningberg
- Andreas Ekberg
- Astrit Selmani
- Victor Larsson
