= Arcushallen =

Arena Sweden

Coordinates: 65.5969°N 22.0608°E

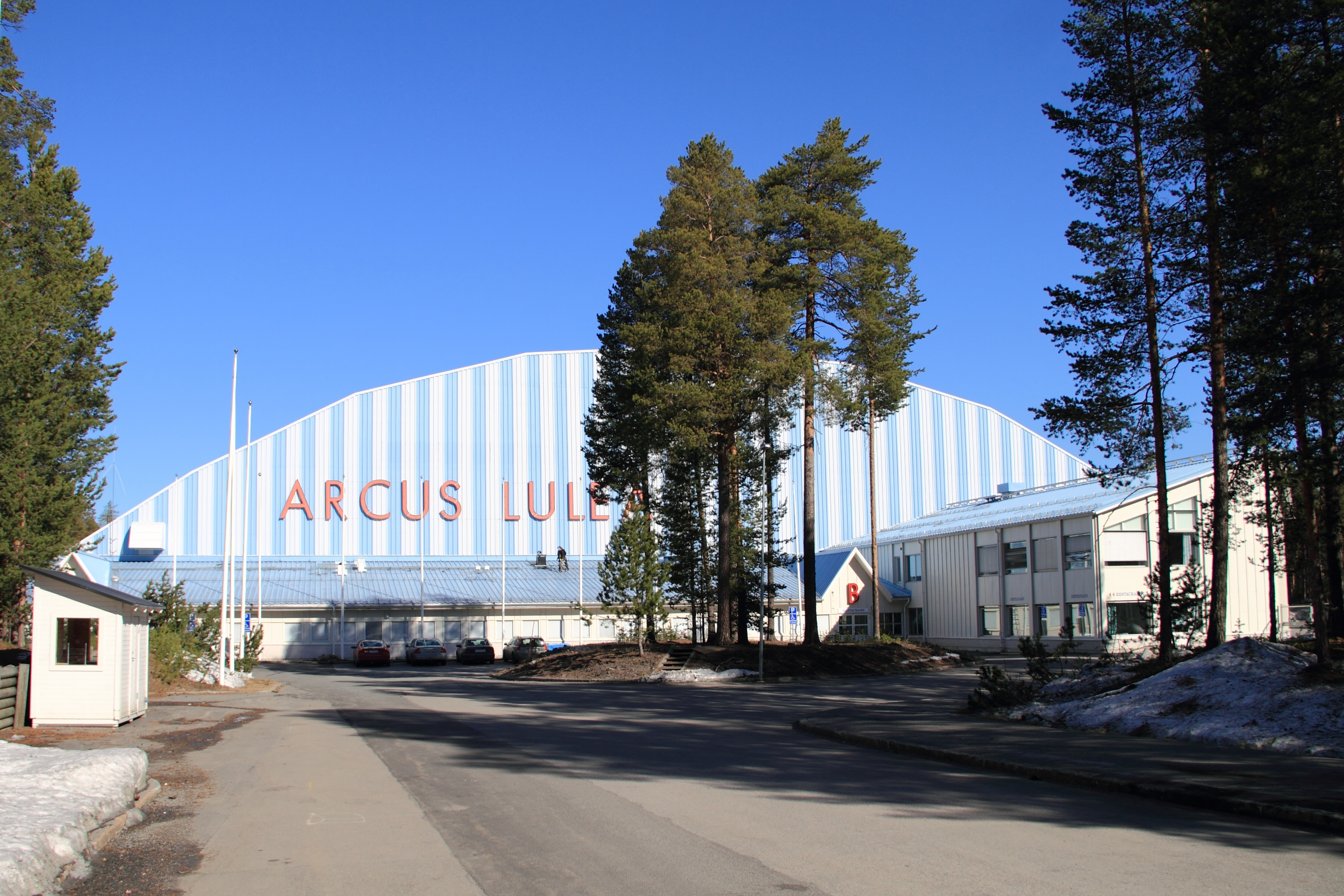
Arcushallen

Arcushallen is an indoor arena located in Luleå, Sweden. It opened in 1986 and is primarily used for concerts and sporting events.
