= Albin Sporrong =

Swedish footballer

Personal information
- Full name: Albin Petrus Sporrong
- Date of birth: 6 December 1999 (age 26)
- Height: 1.83 m (6 ft 0 in)
- Position: Midfielder

Team information
- Current team: Brage
- Number: 8

Youth career
- Skogstorps GOIF
- –2018: Västerås SK

Senior career*
Years	Team	Apps	(Gls)
2019–2021	Västerås SK	42	(2)
2019	→ Västerås IK (loan)	5	(0)
2019	→ Nyköpings BIS (loan)	9	(0)
2020	→ IFK Eskilstuna (loan)	3	(0)
2021–2023	Mjøndalen IF	32	(1)
2023	→ Östersund (loan)	24	(1)
2024–2025	Östersund	54	(4)
2026–	Brage	28	(4)
- * Club domestic league appearances and goals as of 12 November 2026

Albin Sporrong (born 6 December 1999) is a Swedish professional footballer who plays as a midfielder for Brage.

== Career ==
In March 2023, Sporrong joined Östersund on loan for the 2023 season with the option to make the move permanent.
