= Victor Larsson =

Swedish footballer

Personal information
- Full name: Victor Oliver Larsson
- Date of birth: 19 April 2000 (age 26)
- Place of birth: Höllviken, Sweden
- Height: 1.83 m (6 ft 0 in)
- Position: Centre-back

Team information
- Current team: Kalmar FF
- Number: 2

Youth career
- 2005–2012: BK Höllviken
- 2012–2019: Malmö FF

Senior career*
Years	Team	Apps	(Gls)
2019–2020	Torns IF	30	(0)
2020–2026	IFK Värnamo	126	(3)
2026–	Kalmar FF	11	(0)
- * Club domestic league appearances and goals as of 8 July 2026

Victor Oliver Larsson (born 19 April 2000) is a Swedish professional footballer who plays as a centre-back for Allsvenskan club Kalmar FF.

== Club career ==
Larsson is a youth product of the academies of BK Höllviken and Malmö. On 27 August 2019, he moved to Torns IF where he began his senior career in the Ettan Fotboll. On 21 December 2020, he moved to the Superettan club Värnamo. He helped Värnamo win the 2021 Superettan and earned the club promotion into the Allsvenskan for the first time in their history. On 11 October 2022, he extended his contract with Värnamo until 2025.

== International career ==
Larsson was first called up to the Sweden national team for a training tour in January 2024.

== Honours ==
Värnamo

- Superettan: 2021
