= Filip Gustafsson =

Swedish footballer (born 2003)

Personal information
- Full name: Filip Carl David Gustafsson
- Date of birth: 10 February 2003 (age 23)
- Height: 1.82 m (6 ft 0 in)
- Position: Defensive midfielder

Team information
- Current team: GAIS
- Number: 14

Youth career
- –2017: Smålandsstenars GoIF
- 2019–2021: IF Elfsborg

Senior career*
Years	Team	Apps	(Gls)
2017–2018	Smålandsstenars GoIF	19	(1)
2022–	GAIS	50	(0)
2023–2024	→ Norrby IF (loan)	14	(0)
- * Club domestic league appearances and goals as of 11 November 2025

Filip Gustafsson (born 9 March 2002) is a Swedish footballer who plays as a defensive midfielder for GAIS in Allsvenskan.

Gustafsson hails from Smålandsstenar and started his senior career in Smålandsstenars GoIF. After the 2018 season he went to the academy of IF Elfsborg. Upon not getting a senior contract, he signed for GAIS, then in the 2022 Ettan.

He played 26 of the 30 matches as GAIS won promotion, but was "put in the freezer" in 2023 and seldomly played. He returned to Borås on loan to Norrby IF in the summer of 2023. Gustafsson returned from loan to GAIS in 2024 and made his Allsvenskan debut in May 2024.
