= William Tønning =

Danish/Canadian footballer

Personal information
- Full name: William Ansgar Tønning
- Date of birth: 14/05-1999
- Place of birth: Slagelse, Denmark
- Height: 1.88 m (6 ft 2 in)
- Position: Goalkeeper

Team information
- Current team: Östersund

Youth career
- B.73, Slagelse
- Slagelse B&I

Senior career*
Years	Team	Apps	(Gls)
2021	Ytterhogdals IK	18	(0)
2022	IFK Luleå	28	(0)
2023	Argja Bóltfelag	3	(0)
2023	Hobro IK	1	(0)
2024	Napier City Rovers	26	(0)
2025	Ängelholms FF	0	(0)
2025	KA Akureyri	9	(0)
2026	Östersund	0	(0)
2026	Napier City Rovers		(0)
2026–	Vanuatu United	0	(0)
- * Club domestic league appearances and goals as of 3 October 2026

William Ansgar Tønning (born May 14, 1999) is a Danish professional footballer who plays as a goalkeeper for OFC Professional League club Vanuatu United.

== College career ==
Tønning spent one year playing college soccer at Brandon University in Canada. In his lone season in Brandon, Tønning was twice named Manitoba Colleges Athletic Conference athlete of the week, along with conference MVP for futsal and all-conference for soccer.

== Club career ==
=== Ytterhogdals IK ===
Tønning signed his first professional contract with Swedish Division 2 side Ytterhogdals IK in January 2021. That season, Ytterhogdals qualified for Svenska Cupen group stages for the second time in club history, with a 3-2 win against Vasalunds IF in the last qualifying round.

=== IFK Luleå ===
In February 2022, Tønning signed for Swedish side IFK Luleå. That season, IFK Luleå qualified for Svenska Cupen group stages for the first time in club history, with a 1-0 win against AFC Eskilstuna in the last qualifying round. They also won the district cup, beating Piteå IF 2-0 i the final. After the season, Tønning was nominated for Division 2 Norrland goalkeeper of the season by Unibet.

=== Argja Bóltfelag ===
In January 2023, Tønning signed for Faroe Islands Premier League side Argja Bóltfelag.

=== Hobro IK ===
In July 2023, Tønning signed for Danish 1. Division side Hobro IK after a successful trial period. He got his official debut on September 6th 2023 in a 2-0 win against Kolding BK in the Danish Cup. Tønning left the club at the end of his contract in December 2023.

=== Napier City Rovers ===
In January 2024, Tønning signed with New Zealand club Napier City Rovers for the 2024 Central League and New Zealand National League season.

=== Ängelholms FF ===
On 16 December 2024, Tønning signed with Swedish Ettan Södra club Ängelholms FF. Tønning never played an official match for Ängelholms FF, triggering a clause in his contract to leave for KA Akureyri before the start of the Ettan Södra season.

=== KA Akureyri ===
On 25 March 2025, Tønning signed with Icelandic Besta deild karla club KA Akureyri.

=== Östersund ===
On 3 February 2026, Swedish Superettan club Östersunds FK signed Tønning on a short-term contract until the end of March 2026, covering the group stage of the Svenska Cupen.
