= Noah John =

Swedish footballer

Personal information
- Full name: Noah Åstrand John
- Date of birth: 13 December 2003 (age 22)
- Place of birth: Stockholm, Sweden
- Position: Left-back

Team information
- Current team: Malmö FF
- Number: 23

Youth career
- 2010–2020: IK Frej
- 2021–2022: Hammarby IF
- 2021–2022: → Cagliari (loan)

Senior career*
Years	Team	Apps	(Gls)
2022–2024	Hammarby IF	1	(0)
2022–2024	→ Hammarby TFF (res.)	68	(0)
2025	IK Brage	22	(1)
2026–	Malmö FF	12	(1)
- * Club domestic league appearances and goals as of 13 September 2026

Noah Åstrand John (born 13 December 2003) is a Swedish footballer who plays as a left-back for Malmö FF.

== Early life ==
Born and raised in Stockholm, Sweden, John played youth football with IK Frej. Ahead of the 2021 season, he joined the youth academy of Hammarby IF.

On 4 September 2021, John was sent on a one-year loan to Italian club Cagliari with an option to buy. He went on to make 26 league appearances for their under-19's in the 2021–22 Campionato Primavera, before returning to Sweden.

== Club career ==
=== Hammarby IF ===
In 2022, John made ten appearances for affiliated club Hammarby TFF, helping the side to finish 6th in the Ettan table.

On 9 May 2023, John made his competitive debut for Hammarby in Allsvenskan, coming on as a substitute in a 0–0 home draw against Mjällby AIF.

=== Malmö FF ===
John signed for Malmö FF on 11 March 2026, after an impressive Superettan season with IK Brage.

== Personal life ==
John's maternal grandfather is from Zimbabwe. While playing for IK Brage, John also worked part-time at Telenor.

== Career statistics ==
=== Club ===
As of match played 13 September 2026

Club	Season	League			National Cup (Note: Includes Svenska Cupen)		Continental		Total	
Club	Season	Division	Apps	Goals	Apps	Goals	Apps	Goals	Apps	Goals
Hammarby TFF (reserve)	2022	Ettan	10	0	—		—		10	0
Hammarby TFF (reserve)	2023	Ettan	20	0	—		—		20	0
Hammarby TFF (reserve)	2024	Ettan	28	0	—		—		28	0
Hammarby TFF (reserve)	Total		58	0	—		—		58	0
Hammarby IF	2023	Allsvenskan	1	0	0	0	0	0	1	0
IK Brage	2025	Superettan	22	1	3	0	—		25	1
IK Brage	2026	Superettan	0	0	2	0	—		2	0
IK Brage	Total		22	1	5	0	—		27	1
Malmö	2026	Allsvenskan	12	1	1	0	—		13	1
Career total			93	2	6	0	0	0	99	2
