= Filip Olsson (footballer) =

Swedish footballer

Personal information
- Full name: Filip Ronny Sigvard Olsson
- Date of birth: 24 April 1999 (age 27)
- Height: 1.88 m (6 ft 2 in)
- Position: Midfielder

Team information
- Current team: Östers IF
- Number: 11

Youth career
- Kävlinge GIF
- –2016: Landskrona BoIS

Senior career*
Years	Team	Apps	(Gls)
2017–2018	Eslövs BK	37	(3)
2019–2021	Landskrona BoIS	80	(17)
2022–2025	IK Sirius	34	(1)
2025	→ Sandviken (loan)	28	(3)
2026–	Östers IF	26	(3)
- * Club domestic league appearances and goals as of 12 November 2026

Filip Olsson (born 24 April 1999) is a Swedish footballer who plays as a midfielder for Östers IF in Superettan.

== Career ==
Olsson started his youth career in Kävlinge GIF. He joined Landskrona BoIS youth setup, but was not initially offered a senior contract. Having played two seasons for Eslöv in Division 3, the fifth tier of Swedish football, he got his first senior contract with Landskrona in 2019 when the team languished in Division 1. The team won promotion and Olsson made his Superettan debut in 2021. Olsson scored a goal in the second leg of the promotion playoff against Dalkurd. After the season he was named Player of the Year in Landskrona BoIS.

Olsson made the move to the highest tier with IK Sirius ahead of the 2022 season. Poised to make his debut in the cup against IF Sylvia, Olsson even scored a goal. With the 2022 season well underway, Olsson sustained a serious knee injury in September and had to undergo surgery.

Having barely started any matches during his first three years at Sirius, Olsson signed a loan deal with Sandvikens IF spanning the 2025 season.
