= Manasse Kusu =

Swedish footballer

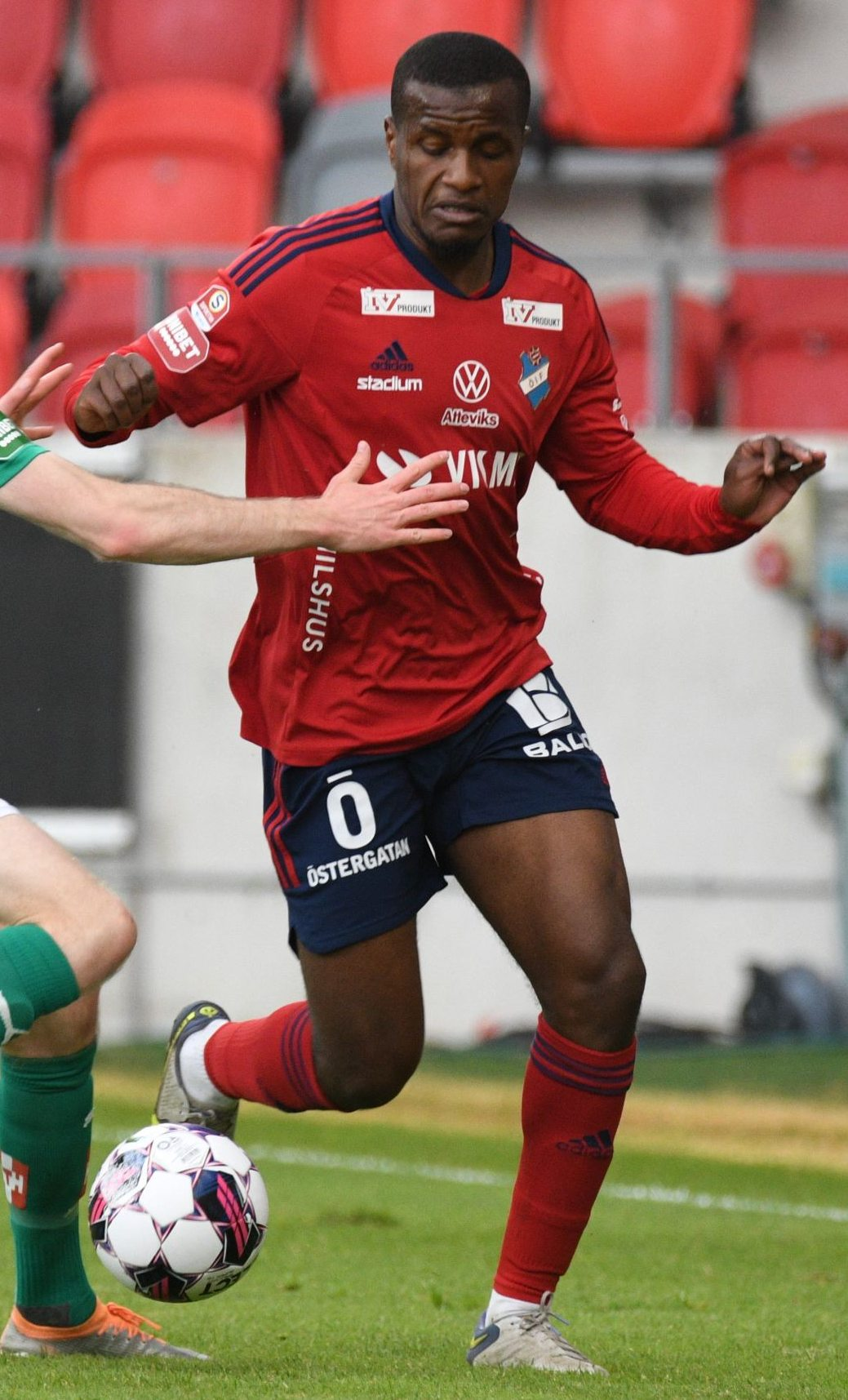

Personal information
- Date of birth: 22 December 2001 (age 24)
- Place of birth: DR Congo
- Position: Midfielder

Team information
- Current team: Örebro (on loan from Mjällby)
- Number: 8

Youth career
- Sleipner
- Norrköping

Senior career*
Years	Team	Apps	(Gls)
2017–2021	Norrköping	9	(0)
2017–2019	→ Sylvia (loan)	45	(4)
2021	→ Öster (loan)	15	(0)
2022–2024	Öster	68	(5)
2024–	Mjällby	5	(0)
2025	→ Jaro (loan)	20	(0)
2026–	→ Örebro (loan)	18	(1)

International career^{‡}
2017-2018	Sweden U17	22	(0)
2019	Sweden U19	11	(0)
2021–	Sweden U20	2	(0)
- * Club domestic league appearances and goals as of 12 November 2026 ‡ National team caps and goals as of 19 April 2025

Manasse Kusu (born 22 December 2001) is a Swedish footballer who plays for Superettan club Örebro SK, on loan from Mjällby.

== Club career ==
After playing for Öster on loan in the second half of the 2021 season, Kusu signed a three-year contract with the club on 24 January 2022.

At the end of March 2025, he was sent on loan to newly promoted Veikkausliiga club FF Jaro until the end of June.

In the end of 2025, it was announced that he will join Superettan side Örebro SK on loan-deal for the 2026-season, with an option to made the deal permanent after.

== Personal life ==
Kusu is born in Congo, but moved with his mother to Sweden at age 12.
