= Samuel Ohlsson =

Swedish footballer

Personal information
- Full name: Samuel Mikael Kotte Ohlsson
- Date of birth: 13 May 2001 (age 25)
- Place of birth: Sweden
- Height: 1.80 m (5 ft 11 in)
- Position: Defender

Team information
- Current team: IFK Värnamo
- Number: 4

Youth career
- –2019: IFK Göteborg

Senior career*
Years	Team	Apps	(Gls)
2019	IFK Göteborg	1	(0)
2020–2021	Örgryte	3	(1)
2021	→ Ljungskile (loan)	12	(0)
2022–2025	Ljungskile	106	(2)
2026–	IFK Värnamo	20	(0)

International career^{‡}
2016–2018	Sweden U17	20	(0)
2018–2019	Sweden U19	11	(0)
- * Club domestic league appearances and goals as of 12 November 2026 ‡ National team caps and goals as of 19 November 2019

Samuel Ohlsson (born 13 May 2001) is a Swedish footballer who plays for IFK Värnamo as a defender.

== Club career ==
After playing for Ljungskile on loan in the second half of the 2021 season, on 1 February 2022 Ohlsson returned to the club on a permanent basis on a one-year deal.

== Personal life ==
He is the younger brother of Degerfors IF player Sebastian Ohlsson.
