= Marcus Baggesen =

Danish footballer (born 2003)

Personal information
- Date of birth: 17 July 2003 (age 23)
- Place of birth: Hjørring, Denmark
- Height: 1.77 m (5 ft 10 in)
- Position: Defender

Team information
- Current team: Västerås SK
- Number: 3

Youth career
- Hjørring IF
- –2023: Silkeborg IF

Senior career*
Years	Team	Apps	(Gls)
2023–2025	IFK Norrköping	63	(0)
2026–	Västerås SK	9	(1)
- * Club domestic league appearances and goals as of 8 July 2026

Marcus Baggesen (born 17 July 2003) is a Danish footballer who plays as a defender for Västerås SK.

== Career ==
He hails from Hjørring. Baggesen joined Silkeborg IF as a youth player. In January 2023, Silkeborg's director of sports stated that a move up to the first team was out of the question, with players like Lukas Engel, Lukas Klitten, Gustav Dahl and possibly Oscar Fuglsang occupying the spots. Baggesen left Silkeborg and signed for Swedish club IFK Norrköping in Allsvenskan.

Baggesen quickly became a starter at Norrköping and thus made his breakthrough. In June 2023, Baggesen was ranked as number 77 on the Golden Boy award's top 100 talent list.

After IFK Norrköping's relegation, he joined Västerås SK in the start of 2026 on a contract until 2028.
