= Vilmer Tyrén =

Swedish footballer (born 2005)

Personal information
- Full name: Jens Vilmer Tyrén
- Date of birth: 3 May 2005 (age 21)
- Place of birth: Alingsås, Sweden
- Height: 1.87 m (6 ft 2 in)
- Position: Attacking midfielder

Team information
- Current team: Ljungskile SK (on loan from Kalmar FF)
- Number: 8

Youth career
- –2021: Gerdskens BK
- 2023–2026: IFK Göteborg

Senior career*
| Years | Team | Apps | (Gls) |
| 2021–2022 | Gerdskens BK | 26 | (9) |
| 2023–2026 | IFK Göteborg | 3 | (0) |
| 2023–2024 | → Västra Frölunda IF (loan) | 26 | (10) |
| 2025 | → Ljungskile SK (loan) | 27 | (20) |
| 2026– | Kalmar FF | 8 | (0) |
| 2026– | → Ljungskile SK (loan) | 9 | (1) |
- * Club domestic league appearances and goals as of 12 November 2026

Jens Vilmer Tyrén (born 3 May 2005) is a Swedish footballer who plays as an attacking midfielder for Ljungskile SK, on loan from Kalmar FF.
