= Daniel Miljanović =

Swedish footballer

Personal information
- Date of birth: 11 April 2001 (age 25)
- Place of birth: Elche, Spain
- Height: 1.78 m (5 ft 10 in)
- Position: Midfielder

Team information
- Current team: Östersund
- Number: 27

Youth career
- 2014–2016: CD El Altet
- 2014–2016: Elche
- 2014–2016: Syrianska
- 2016–2018: Elfsborg

Senior career*
Years	Team	Apps	(Gls)
2018–2020	AFC Eskilstuna	10	(0)
2018	→ Eskilstuna City (loan)	25	(1)
2019	→ IFK Eskilstuna (loan)	2	(0)
2021	Mladost Doboj Kakanj	10	(0)
2021–2022	Ljubić Prnjavor	12	(2)
2022	Novigrad		
2022–2023	Tekstilac Derventa	13	(2)
2023–2024	Krumovgrad	29	(2)
2024	Fužinar	12	(0)
2025	Nordic United	28	(5)
2026–	Östersund	28	(0)

International career
2017	Sweden U17	2	(0)
2018–2019	Sweden Futsal U19	5	(1)
2019	Sweden U19	1	(0)
- * Club domestic league appearances and goals as of 11 November 2026

Daniel Miljanović (born 11 April 2001) is a Swedish footballer who plays as a midfielder for Östersund.

== Club career ==
Born in Spain, Miljanović started his career at CD El Altet. Miljanović then moved to Elche CF before moving with his family to Sweden and joining Syrianska FC. Between 2016 and 2017, Miljanović also played for IF Elfsborg.

Ahead of the 2018 season, Miljanović joined AFC Eskilstuna. During the 2018 season he played 25 games and scored one goal for fellow club Eskilstuna City in Division 2. Miljanović got injured ahead of the 2019 season and after returning from injury, he played a few games for IFK Eskilstuna in Division 3, while also playing for AFC Eskilstuna's U-21 team. On 18 May 2019, Miljanović made his Allsvenskan debut in a 1-1 match against Helsingborgs IF, where he was substituted in the 68th minute for Ferid Ali.

In June 2020, Miljanović returned to IF Elfsborg to play for the U19 team. In February 2021, Miljanović moved abroad to play for Bosnian side Mladost Doboj Kakanj, where his father was the coach. He later had a short spell at Ljubić Prnjavor, before moving to Croatian club NK Novigrad in 2022.

== Personal life ==
Miljanović was born in Spain, where his father Nemanja was a manager. He moved to Sweden with his family at a young age.
