= Amar Muhsin =

Iraqi footballer

Personal information
- Date of birth: 27 December 1997 (age 28)
- Place of birth: Gothenburg, Sweden
- Height: 1.90 m (6 ft 3 in)
- Position: Striker

Team information
- Current team: Gimpo
- Number: 33

Youth career
- Bergsjö IF
- 2013-2014: FC Bosona
- 2015–2017: Utsiktens BK

Senior career*
Years	Team	Apps	(Gls)
2017–2018	Gunnilse IS	33	(26)
2019	Utsiktens BK	29	(14)
2020	Jönköpings Södra IF	0	(0)
2020	→ Skövde AIK (loan)	21	(13)
2021	Assyriska IK	30	(14)
2022	AFC Eskilstuna	18	(12)
2022–2024	Helsingborgs IF	51	(11)
2024	→ Brage (loan)	16	(4)
2025	Brage	29	(21)
2026–	Gimpo	6	(0)

International career^{‡}
2022–	Iraq	2	(0)
- * Club domestic league appearances and goals as of 5 August 2026 ‡ National team caps and goals as of 2 June 2023

Amar Muhsin (Arabic: عَمَّار مُحسِن; born 27 December 1997) is a professional footballer who plays for South Korean club Gimpo. Born in Sweden, he represents the Iraq national team.

== Early life ==
Born in Gothenburg to an Iraqi father and a Bosnian mother, he dreamt of playing for IFK Göteborg as a child.

== Club career ==
Muhsin started his senior career in the lower divisions, first with Gothenburg minnows Gunnilse IS and Utsiktens BK. He was picked up by second-tier Jönköpings Södra IF, but only got playing time in Skövde AIK and Assyriska IK. In 2022 he started the season for second-tier AFC Eskilstuna. On 11 August the same year he was bought by Helsingborgs IF in an effort to retain their Allsvenskan berth. His third goal in five matches came against IFK Göteborg. After four goals in six matches he hoped to save Helsingborg from relegation, and though his goal of playing on Sweden's highest level had been accomplished, this was "only a beginning".

On 9 July 2024, IK Brage signed Muhsin on a loan-deal for the rest of the season, with an option to make the deal permanent from 2025. On November 1, 2024, Brage confirmed that they had triggered the purchase option.

== International career ==
Muhsin is eligible to represent Sweden, Iraq and Bosnia and Herzegovina. He is eligible to represent Iraq through his father, who is from Kirkuk and while the Bosnian press picked up on Muhsin’s goalscoring form in the Allsvenskan, he had picked to represent Iraq in mid-2022 and began the procedures to gain Iraqi citizenship in order to be able to represent the national team. On 27 October 2022, the Iraqi FA confirmed that Muhsin had obtained his passport, and on 28 October 2022, he was selected by interim manager Radhi Shenaishil to the national team to face Mexico, Ecuador and Costa Rica in November as the respective nations prepare for their 2022 FIFA World Cup campaigns. He debuted with Iraq as a late substitute in a 4–0 friendly loss to Mexico on 9 November 2022.
