= Stångby =

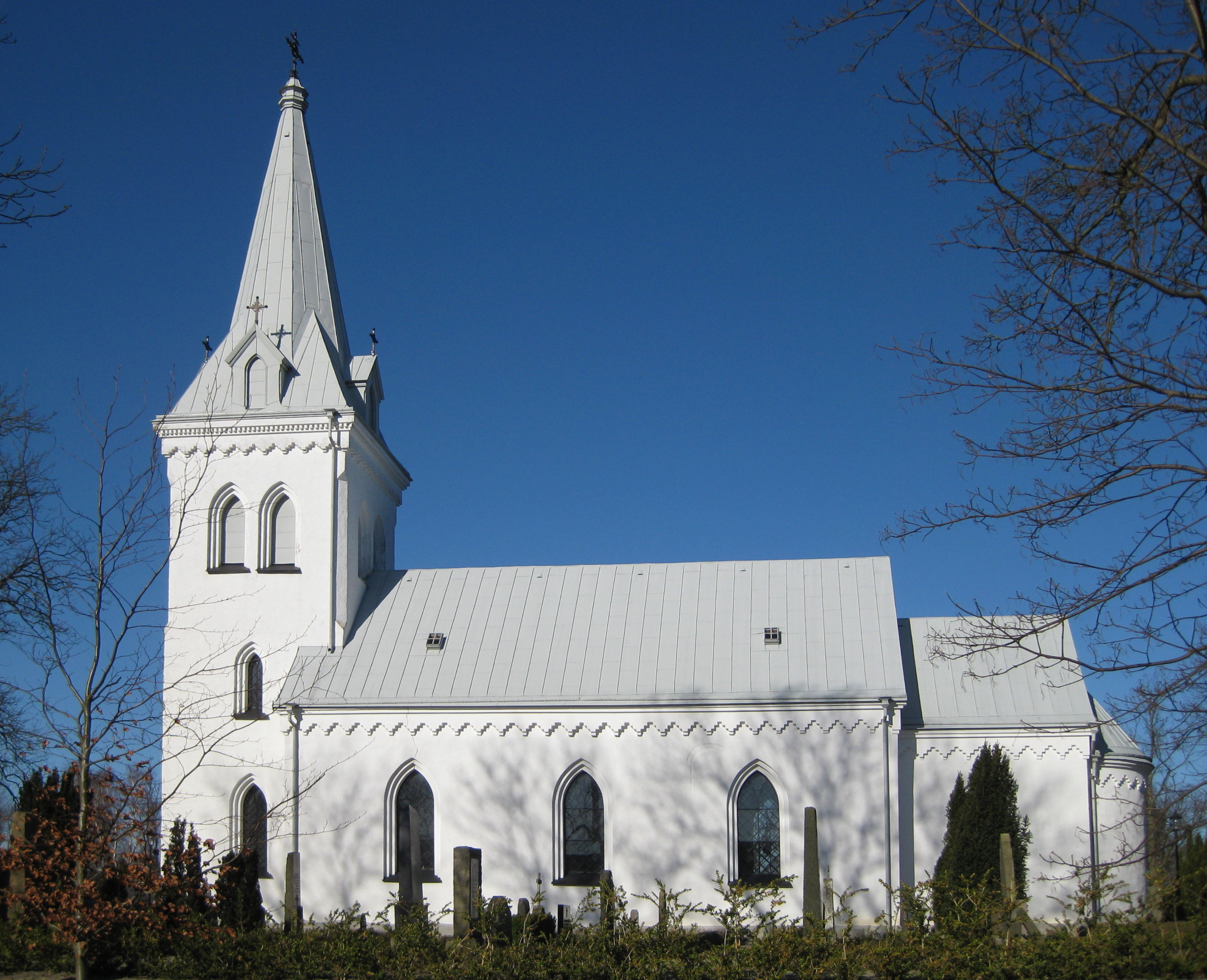
- Stångby Church

- Location within Skåne Location within Sweden
- Coordinates: 55°46′N 13°10′E
- Country: Sweden
- Province: Skåne
- County: Skåne County
- Municipality: Lund Municipality

Area
  - Total: 0.79 km^{2} (0.31 sq mi)

Population (31 December 2010)
  - Total: 1,218
  - Density: 1,546/km^{2} (4,000/sq mi)
- Time zone: UTC+1 (CET)
  - Summer (DST): UTC+2 (CEST)

Stångby is a locality situated in Lund Municipality, Skåne County, Sweden with 1,218 inhabitants in 2010. It is located approximately five km north of Lund.
