= Felix Hörberg =

Swedish footballer (born 1999)

Personal information
- Full name: Felix Micael Hörberg
- Date of birth: 19 May 1999 (age 27)
- Place of birth: Sweden
- Height: 1.80 m (5 ft 11 in)
- Position: Midfielder

Team information
- Current team: IK Brage
- Number: 23

Youth career
- –2009: Västra Ingelstad IS
- 2010–2014: Malmö FF
- 2015: Kvarnby IK
- 2016–2017: Trelleborgs FF

Senior career*
Years	Team	Apps	(Gls)
2018–2019	Trelleborgs FF	41	(6)
2019–2022	Östersunds FK	77	(4)
2022–2026	Trelleborgs FF	76	(1)
2026–	IK Brage	12	(2)

International career
2018–2019	Sweden U19	3	(0)
2020	Sweden U21	2	(0)
- * Club domestic league appearances and goals as of 22 July 2026

Felix Micael Hörberg (born 19 May 1999) is a Swedish footballer who plays for Superettan club IK Brage.
