= Emil Tot Wikström =

Swedish footballer

Personal information
- Date of birth: 10 October 1999 (age 27)
- Height: 1.76 m (5 ft 9 in)
- Position: Midfielder

Team information
- Current team: Umeå (on loan from Brage)
- Number: 11

Youth career
- Snöstorp Nyhem FF
- –2017: Halmstads BK

Senior career*
| Years | Team | Apps | (Gls) |
| 2018–2022 | Halmstads BK | 96 | (11) |
| 2023– | Brage | 54 | (3) |
| 2025– | → Umeå (loan) | 5 | (0) |
- * Club domestic league appearances and goals as of 16 November 2025

Emil Tot Wikström (born 10 October 1999) is a Swedish professional footballer who plays as a midfielder for Umeå, on loan from Brage.
