= List of Swedish football transfers winter 2024–25 =

This is a list of Swedish football transfers for the 2024–25 winter transfer window. Only transfers featuring Allsvenskan and Superettan are listed.

== Allsvenskan ==
Note: Flags indicate national team as has been defined under FIFA eligibility rules. Players may hold more than one non-FIFA nationality.

=== Malmö ===
In:

No.	Pos.	Nation	Player
2	DF	SWE	Johan Karlsson (from Kalmar)
8	MF	ISL	Arnór Sigurðsson (from (England) Blackburn Rovers)
11	MF	SWE	Emmanuel Ekong (from (Italy) Empoli)

Out:

No.	Pos.	Nation	Player
4	DF	FIN	Niklas Moisander (retired)
5	MF	DEN	Søren Rieks (retired)
8	MF	PER	Sergio Peña (to (Greece) PAOK)
14	MF	DEN	Sebastian Jørgensen (on loan to Norrköping)
33	DF	SWE	Elison Makolli (to (Denmark) AaB)
39	GK	SWE	William Nieroth (on loan to Olympic)
—	DF	GHA	Banabas Tagoe (reloan to Olympic)
—	MF	SWE	Anton Höög (on loan to Olympic)
—	FW	SWE	Alexandru Ghiţă (on loan to Olympic)
—	DF	SWE	André Alvarez Perez (on loan to Landskrona, previously on loan at Olympic)
—	DF	CMR	Samuel Kotto (to (Belgium) Gent, previously on loan at Värnamo)
—	MF	SOM	Mubaarak Nuh (to Olympic, previously on loan)
—	MF	SEN	Mamadou Diagne (to Västerås, previously on loan at Skövde)

=== Hammarby ===
In:

No.	Pos.	Nation	Player
7	FW	SWE	Paulos Abraham (from (Netherlands) Groningen, previously on loan at Göteborg)
13	DF	SWE	Jonathan Karlsson (from Sandviken)
18	FW	TUN	Sebastian Tounekti (from (Norway) Haugesund)
22	MF	SWE	Jacob Ortmark (from Norrköping)
27	GK	SWE	Felix Jakobsson (from Sandviken)
29	FW	CIV	Elohim Kaboré (from (Ivory Coast) ASEC Mimosas)
32	FW	GHA	Bernard Acheampong (from (Ghana) AsanSka)
—	MF	SWE	Björn Hedlöf (from Täby)
—	MF	SWE	Keyano Marrah (from Stocksund)
—	FW	SWE	Milian Öberg (from Malmö U17)

Out:

No.	Pos.	Nation	Player
8	MF	SWE	Fredrik Hammar (to (Belgium) Mechelen)
13	DF	DEN	Mads Fenger (to (Denmark) Horsens)
15	DF	ESP	Marc Llinares (to (Poland) Śląsk Wrocław)
19	FW	DEN	Sebastian Clemmensen (to Göteborg)
25	GK	SWE	Davor Blažević (to Brommapojkarna)
28	FW	CIV	Bazoumana Touré (to (Germany) TSG Hoffenheim)
29	MF	LBR	Divine Teah (to (Czech Republic) Slavia Prague)
42	GK	SWE	Elton Fischerström (on loan to Hammarby TFF)
—	MF	SWE	Björn Hedlöf (on loan to Hammarby TFF)
—	MF	SWE	Keyano Marrah (on loan to Hammarby TFF)
—	FW	SWE	Milian Öberg (on loan to Hammarby TFF)
—	DF	GHA	Kingsley Gyamfi (on loan to Öster, previously on loan at (Finland) Ekenäs)
—	MF	NIG	Mamane Amadou Sabo (on loan to (Albania) Skënderbeu, previously on loan at (Finland) Mariehamn)
—	FW	MNE	Viktor Đukanović (on loan to (Slovakia) Dunajská Streda, previously on loan at (Belgium) Standard Liège)
—	GK	SWE	Sebastian Selin (to (Norway) Åsane, previously on loan)
—	DF	SWE	Anton Kralj (to (Iceland) Vestri, previously on loan at Sundsvall)
—	MF	SWE	Marcus Rafferty (to Degerfors, previously on loan at (Norway) Aalesund)
—	MF	SWE	Alper Demirol (to (Turkey) Fatih Karagümrük, previously on loan at Skövde)

=== AIK ===
In:

No.	Pos.	Nation	Player
5	MF	SWE	Kazper Karlsson (from (Italy) Bologna Primavera)
8	MF	NOR	Johan Hove (from (Netherlands) Groningen)
9	FW	CYP	Andronikos Kakoullis (from (Cyprus) Omonia)
22	DF	FIN	Jere Uronen (from (United States) Charlotte)
25	FW	SWE	William Hofvander (from Umeå)
29	FW	IRQ	Danilo Al-Saed (on loan from (Netherlands) Heerenveen)
30	GK	SWE	Kalle Joelsson (from Helsingborg)
32	DF	CRO	Filip Benković (free agent)
33	MF	HUN	Áron Csongvai (from (Hungary) Fehérvár)

Out:

No.	Pos.	Nation	Player
5	DF	SWE	Alexander Milošević (to (England) Portsmouth)
8	MF	FIN	Onni Valakari (loan return to (Cyprus) Pafos)
12	DF	SWE	Axel Björnström (to Värnamo)
22	DF	SWE	Jimi Nikko (loan return to (Italy) Lecce U20)
23	GK	SRB	Budimir Janošević (free agent)
25	MF	ESP	Lamine Fanne (to (England) Luton Town)
28	FW	CYP	Ioannis Pittas (to (Bulgaria) CSKA Sofia)
30	GK	MLI	Ismael Diawara (to Sirius)
31	FW	LBR	Emmanuel Gono (on loan to (Norway) Start)
—	FW	KEN	Henry Atola (reloan to Eskilstuna)
—	DF	SWE	Rasmus Bonde (on loan to (Norway) Raufoss, previously on loan at Vasalund)
—	FW	SWE	Aaron Stoch Rydell (on loan to Gefle, previously on loan at Karlberg)

=== Djurgården ===
In:

No.	Pos.	Nation	Player
11	FW	SWE	Zakaria Sawo (from (Cyprus) Aris Limassol)
14	MF	SWE	Hampus Finndell (from (Norway) Viking)
21	DF	SWE	Mikael Marqués (from Västerås)
23	FW	SVN	Nino Žugelj (from (Norway) Bodø/Glimt)
33	MF	FIN	Matias Siltanen (from (Finland) KuPS)
45	GK	SRB	Filip Manojlović (from (Bosnia and Herzegovina) Borac Banja Luka)

Out:

No.	Pos.	Nation	Player
7	MF	SWE	Magnus Eriksson (to FC Stockholm)
9	MF	SRB	Haris Radetinac (to Åtvidaberg)
11	FW	TUR	Deniz Hümmet (to (Japan) Gamba Osaka)
14	MF	SWE	Besard Šabović (to (United States) Austin)
17	DF	DEN	Peter Therkildsen (on loan to (Poland) Widzew Łódź)
23	FW	NOR	Gustav Wikheim (to (Denmark) Nordsjælland)
45	GK	SWE	Oscar Jansson (to Häcken)
—	DF	KEN	Frank Odhiambo (on loan to Karlstad, previously on loan at Eskilstuna)
—	MF	SWE	Gideon Granström (on loan to Östersund, previously on loan at FC Stockholm)
—	FW	SWE	Kalipha Jawla (on loan to Östersund, previously on loan at Utsikten)

=== Mjällby ===
In:

No.	Pos.	Nation	Player
4	DF	SWE	Axel Norén (from GAIS)
6	MF	SWE	Ludwig Małachowski Thorell (from Sandviken)
9	FW	UGA	Calvin Kabuye (from Sandviken)
15	FW	NOR	Bork Bang-Kittilsen (from (Norway) Odd)
20	MF	SWE	Måns Isaksson (from Jönköping Södra)
26	DF	NGA	Uba Charles (on loan from (Norway) Lillestrøm)
33	DF	FIN	Tony Miettinen (from (Norway) Odd)

Out:

No.	Pos.	Nation	Player
3	DF	SWE	Arvid Brorsson (to (Italy) Monza)
4	DF	SWE	Rasmus Wikström (to Elfsborg)
6	MF	SWE	Imam Jagne (to Göteborg)
8	MF	SWE	Manasse Kusu (on loan to (Finland) Jaro)
15	DF	SWE	Liam Svensson (on loan to Trollhättan)
20	DF	SWE	Johan Persson Åhstedt (on loan to Hässleholm)
23	DF	SWE	Filip Åkesson Linderoth (on loan to Hässleholm)
26	MF	SWE	Kimmen Nennesson (on loan to Nosaby)
29	MF	SWE	Isac Johnsson (on loan to Kristianstad)
30	GK	SWE	Hugo Fagerberg (on loan to Ängelholm)
—	FW	SWE	Love Björnson (on loan to Lund, previously on loan at Eskilstuna)
—	FW	NGA	Yusuf Abdulazeez (on loan to Norrby, previously on loan at Varberg)
—	MF	ISL	Guðmundur Baldvin Nökkvason (to (Iceland) Stjarnan, previously on loan)

=== GAIS ===
In:

No.	Pos.	Nation	Player
2	DF	CAN	Matteo de Brienne (from (Canada) Atlético Ottawa)
4	DF	SWE	Oskar Ågren (from Brage)
16	FW	SWE	Rasmus Niklasson Petrovic (from Oskarshamn)
17	MF	ISL	Róbert Frosti Thorkelsson (from (Iceland) Stjarnan)
18	MF	SWE	Kevin Holmén (from Elfsborg, previously on loan at Degerfors)
19	FW	CIV	Ibrahim Diabate (from Västerås)
29	FW	SWE	Daniel Bengtsson (from Skärhamn)
30	GK	SWE	Victor Astor (from Norrby)
32	MF	SWE	Harun Ibrahim (from (Norway) Molde, previously on loan)

Out:

No.	Pos.	Nation	Player
2	DF	ALB	Egzon Binaku (free agent)
4	DF	SWE	Axel Norén (to Mjällby)
10	FW	SWE	Mervan Çelik (retired)
18	FW	SWE	Alexander Ahl Holmström (to (Germany) 1. FC Magdeburg)
19	FW	NGA	Richard Friday (to (Uzbekistan) Dinamo Samarqand)
33	GK	SWE	Erik Krantz (free agent)
—	GK	SWE	Erik Westgärds (free agent, previously on loan at Ljungskile)

=== Elfsborg ===
In:

No.	Pos.	Nation	Player
4	DF	NOR	Daniel Granli (from (Netherlands) ADO Den Haag)
6	DF	SWE	Rasmus Wikström (from Mjällby)
10	MF	SWE	Simon Olsson (from (Netherlands) Heerenveen)
11	FW	SWE	Taylor Silverholt (from Helsingborg)
16	MF	FIN	Altti Hellemaa (from Trelleborg)
18	MF	ISL	Júlíus Magnússon (from (Norway) Fredrikstad)
24	FW	DEN	Frederik Ihler (on loan from (Norway) Molde)
25	MF	ISL	Ari Sigurpálsson (from (Iceland) Víkingur Reykjavik)
30	GK	SWE	Lucas Hägg-Johansson (from Brommapojkarna)

Out:

No.	Pos.	Nation	Player
4	DF	SWE	Gustav Henriksson (to (Poland) Cracovia)
6	MF	ISL	Andri Baldursson (loan return to (Italy) Bologna)
10	MF	GHA	Michael Baidoo (to (England) Plymouth Argyle)
11	MF	ISL	Eggert Aron Guðmundsson (to (Norway) Brann)
12	FW	DEN	Emil Holten (on loan to (Norway) Fredrikstad)
14	FW	GHA	Jalal Abdullai (on loan to (Norway) Molde)
16	MF	KEN	Timothy Ouma (to (Czech Republic) Slavia Prague)
18	MF	SWE	Ahmed Qasem (to (United States) Nashville)
25	MF	SWE	Enzo Andrén (to Utsikten)
30	GK	DEN	Marcus Bundgaard (to (Denmark) Sønderjyske)
32	DF	GHA	Rufai Mohammed (on loan to Värnamo)
—	GK	SWE	Melker Uppenberg (on loan to Umeå, previously on loan at Oskarshamn)
—	FW	SWE	Camil Jebara (on loan to Kalmar, previously on loan at Västerås)
—	FW	KOS	Dion Krasniqi (on loan to (Finland) KuPS, previously on loan at Kalmar)
—	MF	SWE	André Boman (to Halmstad, previously on loan)
—	MF	SWE	Kevin Holmén (to GAIS, previously on loan at Degerfors)
—	MF	SWE	Noah Söderberg (to Öster, previously on loan at Halmstad)

=== Häcken ===
In:

No.	Pos.	Nation	Player
5	DF	NOR	Brice Wembangomo (from (Norway) Bodø/Glimt)
6	DF	FIN	Leo Väisänen (from (United States) Austin)
8	MF	DEN	Silas Andersen (from (Netherlands) Utrecht)
32	GK	SWE	Oscar Jansson (from Djurgården)

Out:

No.	Pos.	Nation	Player
5	DF	NOR	Even Hovland (to Brommapojkarna)
6	DF	SWE	Axel Lindahl (to Öster)
8	FW	NOR	Lars Olden Larsen (loan return to (Netherlands) NEC)
10	FW	TUN	Ali Youssef (to (Cyprus) Apollon Limassol)
23	FW	SWE	Jeremy Agbonifo (on loan to (France) Lens)
27	MF	CIV	Romeo Amane (to (Austria) Rapid Wien)
43	DF	SWE	Johannes Engvall (on loan to Norrby)
44	MF	SWE	Joel Hjalmar (on loan to Norrby)
—	GK	SWE	Sebastian Banozić (to Norrby, previously on loan at Torslanda)
—	MF	BIH	Semir Bosnić (to Trollhättan, previously on loan at Ljungskile)
—	FW	MKD	Filip Trpcevski (to Brage, previously on loan at Örgryte)

=== Sirius ===
In:

No.	Pos.	Nation	Player
1	GK	MLI	Ismael Diawara (from AIK)
3	DF	UKR	Bohdan Milovanov (free agent)
4	DF	DEN	Tobias Anker (from (Denmark) AGF)
9	FW	SCO	Robbie Ure (from (Belgium) RSCA Futures)
15	DF	SWE	Simon Sandberg (from (Greece) Lamia)
29	FW	SWE	Isak Bjerkebo (from Varberg)

Out:

No.	Pos.	Nation	Player
4	DF	SWE	Henrik Castegren (to (Hungary) Debrecen)
9	FW	DEN	Yousef Salech (to (Wales) Cardiff City)
11	MF	SWE	Filip Olsson (on loan to Sandviken)
15	DF	SWE	Andreas Murbeck (to Landskrona)
30	GK	SWE	Jakob Tånnander (to (Italy) Cremonese)
31	DF	SWE	Malcolm Jeng (to (France) Reims)
—	DF	CPV	Kristopher Da Graca (on loan to (Switzerland) Schaffhausen, previously on loan at (Finland) KuPS)
—	GK	SWE	Hannes Sveijer (to Sandviken, previously on loan)
—	DF	ISL	Óli Valur Ómarsson (to (Iceland) Breiðablik, previously on loan at (Iceland) Stjarnan)
—	MF	SWE	Emil Özkan (to Enköping, previously on loan)

=== Brommapojkarna ===
In:

No.	Pos.	Nation	Player
3	DF	NOR	Even Hovland (from Häcken)
6	DF	SWE	Oliver Zandén (from (France) Toulouse, previously on loan at (Denmark) Randers)
7	FW	DEN	Victor Lind (from (Denmark) Midtjylland)
17	MF	SWE	Anton Kurochkin (from Varberg)
23	FW	GHA	Ezekiel Alladoh (from (Ghana) Accra Lions)
25	GK	SWE	Davor Blažević (from Hammarby)
39	FW	SWE	Nabil Bahoui (free agent)

Out:

No.	Pos.	Nation	Player
1	GK	SWE	Lucas Hägg-Johansson (to Elfsborg)
3	DF	SWE	Alexander Abrahamsson (to (Poland) Zagłębie Lubin)
12	GK	POL	Fabian Mrozek (loan return to (England) Liverpool U21)
13	MF	SWE	Ludvig Fritzson (to (Poland) Zagłębie Lubin)
14	DF	SWE	Theo Bergvall (loan return to Djurgården)
15	MF	SWE	Paya Pichkah (on loan to (Norway) Egersund)
17	DF	DEN	Alexander Jensen (to (Scotland) Aberdeen)
23	DF	SWE	Tim Waker (retired)
28	MF	SWE	Mario Butros (to Arlanda)
31	GK	SWE	Otega Ekperuoh (to Arlanda)
—	DF	SWE	Sebastian Wändin (on loan to Assyriska, previously on loan at Vasalund)
—	FW	SWE	Alexander Johansson (on loan to Utsikten, previously on loan at Varberg)
—	DF	NOR	Liiban Abadid (to Västerås, previously on loan at (Finland) Oulu)

=== Norrköping ===
In:

No.	Pos.	Nation	Player
7	MF	SWE	Alexander Fransson (from (Norway) Odd)
15	MF	DEN	Sebastian Jørgensen (on loan from Malmö)
18	FW	ISL	Jónatan Gudni Arnarsson (from (Iceland) Fjölnir)

Out:

No.	Pos.	Nation	Player
6	DF	SWE	Isak Ssewankambo (free agent)
7	MF	SWE	Jacob Ortmark (to Hammarby)
10	MF	DEN	Vito Hammershøy-Mistrati (to (Denmark) B.93)
15	FW	SWE	Carl Björk (loan return to (Denmark) Brøndby)
16	DF	SWE	Dino Salihović (to (Spain) Valencia Mestalla)
17	FW	ALB	Laorent Shabani (on loan to Varberg)
26	MF	SWE	Kristoffer Khazeni (free agent)
34	MF	SWE	Noel Sernelius (on loan to Husqvarna)
38	MF	SWE	Ture Sandberg (on loan to Sundsvall)
—	GK	SWE	Julius Lindgren (retired, previously on loan at Jönköping Södra)
—	GK	SWE	Otto Lindell (to Sandviken, previously on loan at Skövde)
—	MF	SWE	Fritiof Hellichius (to (Norway) Jerv, previously on loan at Skövde)
—	FW	SWE	Leo Jonsson (to Sylvia, previously on loan at Jönköping Södra)

=== Halmstad ===
In:

No.	Pos.	Nation	Player
4	DF	SWE	Filip Schyberg (from Skövde)
5	DF	DEN	Pascal Gregor (from (Denmark) Lyngby)
17	MF	SWE	André Boman (from Elfsborg, previously on loan)
20	DF	POL	Paweł Chrupałła (from (Norway) Rosenborg, previously on loan at (Norway) Sarpsborg 08)
25	MF	SWE	Aleksander Damnjanovic Nilsson (from (Norway) Sandefjord)
35	GK	SWE	Zackarias Nilsson (from Astrio)

Out:

No.	Pos.	Nation	Player
2	DF	GHA	Thomas Boakye (free agent)
4	DF	SWE	Andreas Johansson (retired)
5	DF	SWE	Joseph Baffoe (free agent)
8	MF	SWE	Jonathan Svedberg (to (Scotland) St. Johnstone)
9	FW	SWE	Jesper Westermark (on loan to Varberg)
19	FW	SWE	Rasmus Wiedesheim-Paul (on loan to Oddevold)
24	MF	SWE	Noah Söderberg (loan return to Elfsborg)
27	DF	BRA	Vinícius Nogueira (on loan to (Norway) Vålerenga)
30	GK	SWE	Alexander Nielsen (to Tvååker)
35	GK	SWE	Zackarias Nilsson (on loan to Astrio)
—	FW	SWE	Alex Hall (on loan to Ängelholm, previously on loan at Skövde)
—	MF	SWE	Leo Hedenberg (to Ängelholm, previously on loan)
—	MF	SWE	Pontus Carlsson (to Sandviken, previously on loan at Tvååker)

=== Göteborg ===
In:

No.	Pos.	Nation	Player
7	FW	TOG	Sebastian Clemmensen (from Hammarby)
8	MF	SWE	Imam Jagne (from Mjällby)
9	FW	DEN	Max Fenger (from (Denmark) OB)
14	FW	NOR	Tobias Heintz (from (Bulgaria) CSKA Sofia)

Out:

No.	Pos.	Nation	Player
2	DF	SWE	Emil Salomonsson (retired)
5	DF	SWE	Sebastian Ohlsson (to Degerfors)
7	FW	SWE	Oscar Pettersson (to (Netherlands) Go Ahead Eagles)
9	FW	DEN	Laurs Skjellerup (to (Italy) Sassuolo)
11	FW	SWE	Paulos Abraham (loan return to (Netherlands) Groningen)
12	GK	NOR	Jacob Karlstrøm (loan return to (Norway) Molde)
14	FW	SWE	Gustaf Norlin (to (Poland) ŁKS Łódź)
17	DF	SWE	Oscar Wendt (retired)
20	FW	NGA	Suleiman Abdullahi (free agent)
22	FW	DEN	Nikolai Baden (loan return to (Denmark) Lyngby)
34	GK	NOR	Anders Kristiansen (loan return to (Norway) Sarpsborg 08)
—	MF	CIV	Abundance Salaou (reloan to Utsikten)

=== Värnamo ===
In:

No.	Pos.	Nation	Player
1	GK	FIN	Hugo Keto (from (Norway) Sandefjord)
3	DF	SWE	Axel Björnström (from AIK)
4	DF	GHA	Rufai Mohammed (on loan from Elfsborg)
6	DF	SWE	Hugo Andersson (from (Denmark) Randers)
21	MF	NGA	Ishaq Abdulrazak (from (Belgium) Anderlecht, previously on loan at (Norway) Odd)

Out:

No.	Pos.	Nation	Player
1	GK	NOR	Jonathan Rasheed (to (Iceland) KA)
6	DF	SWE	Hampus Näsström (to Landskrona)
14	FW	SWE	Gustav Engvall (to (Poland) Miedź Legnica)
15	DF	AUT	Michael Steinwender (to (Scotland) Hearts)
19	MF	CAN	Marco Bustos (to (Canada) Pacific)
23	DF	CMR	Samuel Kotto (loan return to Malmö)
25	FW	SWE	Joel Voelkerling Persson (loan return to (Italy) Lecce)
—	GK	SWE	David Mikhail (free agent, previously on loan at (Finland) Lahti)
—	DF	BRA	Bernardo Vilar (to Västerås, previously on loan at (Kuwait) Al-Nasr)

=== Degerfors ===
In:

No.	Pos.	Nation	Player
4	DF	SWE	Leon Hien (from (Norway) Odd)
5	DF	FIN	Juhani Pikkarainen (from (Finland) Ilves)
10	MF	SWE	Marcus Rafferty (from Hammarby, previously on loan at (Norway) Aalesund)
16	DF	SWE	Sebastian Ohlsson (from Göteborg)
19	FW	PLE	Omar Faraj (on loan from (Egypt) Zamalek)
20	MF	SWE	Elias Barsoum (from Örebro)
22	MF	SWE	Maill Lundgren (from FC Stockholm)
27	FW	GHA	Ziyad Salifu (from (Ghana) Diamond SSC)

Out:

No.	Pos.	Nation	Player
4	MF	SWE	Johan Mårtensson (to Bosna 92)
6	DF	ESP	Carlos Moros (to (Cyprus) Omonia 29M)
8	MF	SWE	Kevin Holmén (loan return to Elfsborg)
9	FW	SWE	Gustav Lindgren (to (England) Peterborough United)
10	FW	SWE	Dijan Vukojević (to (Poland) Wieczysta Kraków)
19	FW	SWE	Jamie Bichis (to Norrby)
24	MF	SWE	De Pievre Ilunga (to Örebro Syrianska)
26	GK	SWE	Filip Järlesand (to Skövde)

=== Öster ===
In:

No.	Pos.	Nation	Player
2	DF	SWE	Axel Lindahl (from Häcken)
3	DF	GHA	Kingsley Gyamfi (on loan from Hammarby, previously on loan at (Finland) Ekenäs)
6	MF	SWE	Noah Söderberg (from Elfsborg, previously on loan at Halmstad)
8	MF	SWE	Daniel Ask (from (Denmark) AaB, previously on loan at Västerås)
12	GK	SWE	Lukas Pihlblad (from Hammarby U19)
14	DF	SWE	Dennis Olsson (from Helsingborg)
17	FW	SWE	Vincent Poppler (from Eskilsminne)
19	MF	FIN	Matias Tamminen (from (Finland) Inter Turku)
25	FW	SEN	Youssoupha Sanyang (from (Senegal) Teungueth, previously on loan at Västerås)
26	MF	DEN	Magnus Christensen (from (Norway) Stabæk)
29	FW	SWE	Christian Kouakou (free agent)

Out:

No.	Pos.	Nation	Player
2	DF	ISL	Thorri Mar Thórisson (to (Iceland) Stjarnan)
8	MF	SWE	Kevin Höög Jansson (loan return to Norrköping)
11	MF	SWE	Hannes Bladh Pijaca (on loan to Ängelholm)
19	FW	SWE	Adam Bergmark Wiberg (to (South Korea) Chungnam Asan)
22	MF	SWE	Petar Petrović (to (Thailand) Bangkok)
24	DF	SWE	Theodor Johansson (to Östersund)
25	FW	NOR	Martin Hoel Andersen (to (Norway) Skeid)
—	GK	SWE	Mirsad Basic (on loan to Oskarshamn, previously on loan at Hässleholm)
—	MF	SWE	Philipp Berndt (on loan to Räppe GoIF, previously on loan at Hässleholm)

== Superettan ==
Note: Flags indicate national team as has been defined under FIFA eligibility rules. Players may hold more than one non-FIFA nationality.

=== Kalmar ===
In:

No.	Pos.	Nation	Player
3	DF	NOR	Sivert Engh Øverby (from (Norway) Mjøndalen)
7	FW	GHA	Isaac Atanga (from (Norway) Aalesund, previously on loan at (Finland) Ilves)
9	FW	SWE	Malcolm Stolt (from (Austria) St. Pölten)
10	FW	SWE	Camil Jebara (on loan from Elfsborg, previously on loan at Västerås)
11	FW	FIN	Anthony Olusanya (from (Finland) HJK, previously on loan at (Finland) Haka)
14	MF	CIV	Awaka Djoro (on loan from (Ivory Coast) ASEC Mimosas)
20	MF	GAM	Gibril Sosseh (from (The Gambia) BST Galaxy)
28	FW	SWE	Abdi Sabriye (from Ariana)
47	DF	USA	Aboubacar Keita (from (United States) Columbus Crew 2)

Out:

No.	Pos.	Nation	Player
3	DF	AUS	Alex Gersbach (to (Australia) Western Sydney Wanderers)
4	DF	NGA	Vince Osuji (to (Belgium) Club Brugge)
7	FW	SWE	Kevin Jensen (to Landskrona)
9	FW	MNE	Dino Islamović (to (Norway) Rosenborg)
10	FW	FIN	Simon Skrabb (to (Greece) Volos)
11	FW	SWE	Jonathan Ring (to Västerås)
12	DF	FRA	Ivan Inzoudine (loan return to (England) Burton Albion)
13	DF	SWE	Johan Karlsson (to Malmö)
20	FW	KOS	Dion Krasniqi (loan return to Elfsborg)
28	FW	SWE	Max Svensson (to Helsingborg)
29	MF	BRA	Romário (retired)

=== Västerås ===
In:

No.	Pos.	Nation	Player
3	DF	NOR	Liiban Abadid (from Brommapojkarna, previously on loan at (Finland) Oulu)
8	MF	SEN	Mamadou Diagne (from Malmö, previously on loan at Skövde)
10	FW	SWE	Jonathan Ring (from Kalmar)
13	MF	SWE	Hugo Engström (from Skövde)
14	MF	ENG	Elijah Dixon-Bonner (on loan from (England) Queens Park Rangers)
17	MF	CIV	Axel Taonsa (from (Bulgaria) Belasitsa Petrich)
23	FW	DEN	Mikkel Ladefoged (from (Denmark) Sønderjyske, previously on loan at (Denmark) Esbjerg)
25	GK	BRA	André Bernardini (from Brage)
26	FW	CMR	Aaron Bibout (from (United States) LA Galaxy, previously on loan at (United States) Tulsa)
33	DF	BRA	Bernardo Vilar (from Värnamo, previously on loan at (Kuwait) Al-Nasr)
—	DF	SWE	Mikael Marqués (from (United States) Minnesota United, previously on loan)

Out:

No.	Pos.	Nation	Player
3	DF	SWE	Gustav Granath (to (Norway) HamKam)
8	MF	BEN	Mattéo Ahlinvi (to (Russia) Arsenal Tula)
10	MF	SWE	Daniel Ask (loan return to (Denmark) AaB)
14	FW	SWE	Viktor Granath (to (Germany) SV Sandhausen)
15	FW	SWE	Camil Jebara (loan return to Elfsborg)
16	DF	NED	Floris Smand (loan return to (Netherlands) Cambuur)
17	FW	CIV	Ibrahim Diabate (to GAIS)
20	FW	NGA	Henry Offia (free agent)
22	DF	SWE	Elyas Bouzaiene (to (Tunisia) Espérance de Tunis)
24	MF	SWE	Marcus Linday (to (Netherlands) Heerenveen)
27	FW	SEN	Youssoupha Sanyang (loan return to (Senegal) Teungueth)
30	FW	SWE	Abdelrahman Boudah (loan return to Hammarby)
31	DF	SWE	Isak Jönsson (to (Norway) Egersund)
32	MF	SWE	Alex Lindelöv (to Skiljebo)
34	GK	SWE	Elis Wahl (retired)
35	GK	SWE	Johan Brattberg (to Helsingborg)
—	DF	SWE	Adam Padovan (on loan to Skiljebo, previously on loan at Eskilstuna)
—	MF	SWE	Hugo Björk (on loan to Eskilstuna, previously on loan at Franke)
—	DF	SWE	Mikael Marqués (to Djurgården)
—	MF	BEL	Samuel Asoma (to Helsingborg, previously on loan at Trelleborg)
—	FW	SWE	David Burubwa (free agent, previously on loan at Oskarshamn)
—	FW	SWE	Liam Larsson (free agent)

=== Landskrona ===
In:

No.	Pos.	Nation	Player
6	DF	SWE	Hampus Näsström (from Värnamo)
8	MF	SWE	Allen Smajic (from AIK U19, previously on loan at Täby)
11	MF	SWE	Markus Björkqvist (from Trelleborg)
14	FW	SWE	Cameron Streete (from FC Stockholm)
18	DF	SWE	André Alvarez Perez (on loan from Malmö, previously on loan at Olympic)
21	FW	SWE	Kevin Jensen (from Kalmar)
26	DF	SWE	Andreas Murbeck (from Sirius)
30	GK	SWE	Marcus Pettersson (on loan from Malmö U19, previously on loan at Olympic)
31	GK	SWE	Albin Andersson (from Malmö U17)

Out:

No.	Pos.	Nation	Player
3	DF	SWE	Gustaf Westström (on loan to Olympic)
5	MF	SWE	Filip Sachpekidis (free agent)
6	DF	SWE	Philip Andersson (to Ariana)
8	MF	SWE	Robin Dzabic (to (Norway) Sandefjord)
11	FW	SWE	Rasmus Wendt (to Lund)
13	DF	SWE	Erik Hedenquist (to Oddevold)
16	DF	SWE	Jesper Strid (Lund)
26	DF	SWE	William Ondrejka (free agent)
28	MF	SWE	Sam Hegdal (to Hässleholm)
30	GK	SWE	Hampus Pauli (to Eskilsminne)

=== Helsingborg ===
In:

No.	Pos.	Nation	Player
1	GK	SWE	Johan Brattberg (from Västerås)
4	DF	DEN	Marcus Gudmann (from (Denmark) Køge)
6	MF	BEL	Samuel Asoma (from Västerås, previously on loan at Trelleborg)
9	FW	SWE	Adam Akimey (from Hammarby TFF)
10	FW	SWE	Max Svensson (from Kalmar)
22	DF	NOR	Max Bjurstrøm (from (Norway) Kjelsås)
27	DF	GAM	Ebrima Bajo (from (The Gambia) Greater TFA)
29	FW	NOR	Oscar Aga (on loan from (Norway) Rosenborg, previously on loan at (Norway) Fredrikstad)

Out:

No.	Pos.	Nation	Player
1	GK	SWE	Kalle Joelsson (to AIK)
4	DF	NOR	Thomas Rogne (free agent)
7	FW	ALB	Arian Kabashi (to Utsikten)
9	FW	SWE	Taylor Silverholt (to Elfsborg)
18	FW	SWE	Anton Nilsson (to Ängelholm)
20	DF	SWE	Dennis Olsson (to Öster)
22	FW	SWE	Chisomnazu Chika Chidi (loan return to GAIS)
24	DF	SWE	Daniel Bergman (to Ängelholm)
25	MF	SWE	Adam Hellborg (free agent)
27	MF	GHA	Benjamin Acquah (to (Portugal) Portimonense)
30	GK	SWE	Nils Arvidsson (to Lund)
—	FW	IRQ	Amar Muhsin (to Brage, previously on loan)

=== Örgryte ===
In:

No.	Pos.	Nation	Player
9	FW	SWE	Liam Andersson (from Torslanda)
16	DF	SWE	Hampus Dahlqvist (from Karlstad)
17	DF	GUI	Madiou Keita (on loan from (France) Auxerre B)

Out:

No.	Pos.	Nation	Player
2	DF	SWE	Linus Tagesson (to Sandviken)
9	FW	SWE	Viktor Lundberg (retired)
17	FW	NGA	Emmanuel Ekpenyong (loan return to (Nigeria) Doma United)
20	FW	MKD	Filip Trpcevski (loan return to Häcken)
25	DF	SEN	Abdoulaye Faye (loan return to Häcken)
27	MF	SWE	Jonatan Vennberg (to Ljungskile)
—	DF	SWE	William Alder (on loan to Jonsered, previously on loan at Torslanda)

=== Sandviken ===
In:

No.	Pos.	Nation	Player
1	GK	SWE	Hannes Sveijer (from Sirius, previously on loan)
4	DF	SWE	Olle Samuelsson (from Oskarshamn)
7	MF	SWE	Johan Arvidsson (from Brage)
9	FW	SWE	William Thellsson (from Lund)
10	FW	SWE	Moonga Simba (from (Norway) Brann)
14	MF	SWE	Victor Backman (from Örebro)
15	MF	SWE	Filip Olsson (on loan from Sirius)
18	MF	CAN	Kamron Habibullah (from (United States) Sporting Kansas City II)
20	MF	SWE	Pontus Carlsson (from Halmstad, previously on loan at Tvååker)
26	DF	SWE	Linus Tagesson (from Örgryte)
30	GK	SWE	Otto Lindell (from Norrköping, previously on loan at Skövde)
99	FW	SWE	Kim Käck Ofordu (from Arlanda)

Out:

No.	Pos.	Nation	Player
1	GK	SWE	Felix Jakobsson (to Hammarby)
3	DF	SWE	Zinedin Smajlović (to (Norway) Sandefjord)
4	DF	SWE	Jonathan Karlsson (to Hammarby)
10	MF	SWE	Ludwig Małachowski Thorell (to Mjällby)
11	FW	SWE	Martin Springfeldt (free agent)
14	FW	RWA	Lague Byiringiro (to (Rwanda) Police FC)
15	FW	NGA	John Junior Igbarumah (to (Uzbekistan) Sogdiana Jizzakh)
18	FW	ENG	James Kirby (to Östersund)
27	DF	SWE	Edvin Devic (free agent)
29	FW	UGA	Calvin Kabuye (to Mjällby)
30	FW	IRQ	Amin Al-Hamawi (to (Poland) Wisła Płock)
92	MF	SLE	Jay Tee Kamara (to (United States) Portland Hearts of Pine)
—	GK	SWE	Emanuel Sjögren Svedberg (free agent)

=== Trelleborg ===
In:

No.	Pos.	Nation	Player
6	MF	FIN	Altti Hellemaa (from (Finland) JäPS)
7	MF	SWE	Jakob Andersson (from Lund)
8	FW	SWE	Oskar Ruuska (from Tvååker)
9	FW	NOR	Emil Jaf (from (Norway) Brann II)
10	MF	FIN	Axel Vidjeskog (from (Finland) KuPS)
12	GK	SWE	Mathias Nilsson (from Gefle)

Out:

No.	Pos.	Nation	Player
2	DF	SWE	Fritiof Björkén (free agent)
4	DF	SWE	Mattias Andersson (free agent)
6	DF	SWE	Johan Stenmark (free agent)
7	MF	DEN	Pierre Larsen (to (Denmark) Hillerød)
8	MF	SWE	Herman Hallberg (to Oskarshamns)
10	MF	SWE	Hady Saleh Karim (to (Iraq) Zakho)
14	MF	BEL	Samuel Asoma (loan return to Västerås)
29	FW	SWE	Othmane Salama (to (Norway) Egersund)
33	GK	SWE	Melker Ellborg (loan return to Malmö)
34	MF	SWE	Markus Björkqvist (to Landskrona)
—	MF	FIN	Altti Hellemaa (to Elfsborg)
—	DF	SWE	Noah Cavander (on loan to Torn, previously on loan at Lödde)
—	DF	FIN	Mikko Viitikko (free agent, previously on loan at (Finland) Lahti)
—	FW	SWE	Tom Wassholm (to Torn, previously on loan)

=== Brage ===
In:

No.	Pos.	Nation	Player
5	DF	ALB	Lorik Konjuhi (from Olympic)
6	MF	DEN	Marinus Larsen (from (Denmark) Horsens)
9	FW	MKD	Filip Trpcevski (from Häcken, previously on loan at Örgryte)
11	MF	SWE	Anton Lundin (from Gefle)
13	GK	SWE	Adrian Engdahl (from Haninge)
19	MF	SWE	Haris Brkic (from (Norway) Sandnes Ulf)
20	FW	SWE	Gustav Nordh (from Sundsvall)
21	DF	SWE	Noah Östberg (from Djurgården U19)
23	DF	SWE	Noah John (from Hammarby TFF)
33	FW	IRQ	Amar Muhsin (from Helsingborg, previously on loan)

Out:

No.	Pos.	Nation	Player
5	DF	SWE	Oskar Ågren (to GAIS)
6	MF	TOG	Adil Titi (to (Italy) Trento)
11	MF	SWE	Johan Arvidsson (to Sandviken)
12	FW	POR	Ieltsin Camões (to (Norway) Tromsø)
13	GK	BRA	André Bernardini (to Västerås)
18	MF	SWE	Ferhan Abic (to Gefle)
19	FW	SWE	Ömür Pektas (to Arlanda)
20	MF	SWE	Filip Sjöberg (retired)
21	MF	SWE	Henry Sletsjøe (to (Norway) Rosenborg)
23	DF	SWE	Christopher Redenstrand (free agent)

=== Utsikten ===
In:

No.	Pos.	Nation	Player
4	DF	SWE	David Tokpah (from Djurgården U19)
9	FW	GAM	Mass Sise (from Nordic United)
10	FW	ALB	Arian Kabashi (from Helsingborg)
15	FW	SWE	Edmond Berisha (from Halmstad U19)
16	FW	SWE	Alexander Johansson (on loan from Brommapojkarna, previously on loan at Varberg)
17	MF	SWE	Enzo Andrén (from Elfsborg)
19	FW	SWE	Johannes Selvén (from (Denmark) OB)
24	MF	CIV	Abundance Salaou (reloan from Göteborg)
25	DF	SWE	Noah Johansson (from Tvååker)
31	GK	SWE	Tom Amos (from Ljungskile)
—	GK	POL	Jakub Ojrzyński (on loan from (England) Liverpool U21)

Out:

No.	Pos.	Nation	Player
4	DF	IRQ	Allan Mohideen (to (Iraq) Al-Karma)
5	DF	SWE	Ben Engdahl (loan return to Häcken)
6	MF	SWE	Erik Westermark (to Landvetter)
9	FW	SWE	Lucas Lima (loan return to (Norway) Fredrikstad)
10	FW	SWE	Jaheem Burke (loan return to (Slovakia) Spartak Trnava)
15	MF	AFG	Suleman Zurmati (to Karlstad)
16	MF	SWE	Dijar Ferati (to (Portugal) Rio Ave U23)
17	FW	SWE	William Nilsson (to Ljungskile)
20	FW	SWE	Kalipha Jawla (loan return to Djurgården)
22	MF	MKD	Predrag Ranđelović (retired)
23	MF	SWE	Ivo Pękalski (retired)
30	GK	IRQ	Elias Hadaya (to (Norway) Sandefjord)
99	FW	SWE	Lorent Mehmeti (on loan to Nordic United)
—	DF	SWE	Sigge Jansson (loan return to Häcken)
—	FW	SYR	Hosam Aiesh (retired)

=== Varberg ===
In:

No.	Pos.	Nation	Player
—	DF	SWE	Edvin Tellgren (from Skövde)
—	MF	SWE	Anton Thorsson (from Ängelholm)
—	GK	SWE	Oscar Ekman (from Oddevold)
—	FW	SWE	Nuurdin Ali Mohudin (from Häcken U19)
—	FW	ALB	Laorent Shabani (on loan from Norrköping)
—	FW	SWE	Jesper Westermark (on loan from Halmstad)

Out:

No.	Pos.	Nation	Player
5	DF	ISL	Oskar Sverrisson (to Ariana)
9	MF	SWE	Anton Kurochkin (to Brommapojkarna)
10	MF	SWE	Diego Montiel (to (Iceland) Vestri)
11	FW	SWE	Isak Bjerkebo (to Sirius)
12	MF	SWE	Kevin Čustović (to (Poland) Wisła Płock)
15	DF	GHA	Gideon Mensah (to Ljungskile)
16	FW	SWE	Alexander Johansson (loan return to Brommapojkarna)
25	FW	NGA	Yusuf Abdulazeez (loan return to Mjällby)
45	MF	SWE	Maxime Sainte (free agent)
—	FW	SWE	Rasmus Cronvall (to Oskarshamn, previously on loan at Varbergs GIF)

=== Örebro ===
In:

No.	Pos.	Nation	Player
2	DF	IRQ	Alai Ghasem (free agent)
6	MF	BIH	Melvin Bajrović (from Hammarby TFF)
8	FW	SWE	Aleksandar Azizovic (from Eskilstuna)
9	FW	SYR	Antonio Yakoub (from Nordic United)
10	MF	SWE	Sebastian Tipura (from Lund)
16	DF	SWE	Hampus Söderström (from Hammarby TFF)
19	FW	GHA	Blessing Asumang (on loan from (Ghana) Accra Lions)
23	FW	SWE	Kim Dickson (from Torslanda)

Out:

No.	Pos.	Nation	Player
2	DF	NOR	Tobias Bjørnstad (to (Bulgaria) Lokomotiv Plovdiv)
6	DF	SWE	Sebastian Crona (to Jönköping Södra)
7	MF	SWE	Elias Barsoum (to Degerfors)
8	MF	ERI	Mohammed Saeid (retired)
10	MF	SWE	Victor Backman (to Sandvikens)
12	DF	SWE	Theodor Hansemon (on loan to Gefle)
13	GK	SWE	Daniel Strindholm (to (Norway) Arendal)
15	DF	SWE	Niclas Bergmark (free agent)
18	FW	SWE	Bilal Fousseni (to Örebro Syrianska)
19	MF	SWE	Malik Mokédé (to Gefle)
27	DF	ISL	Valgeir Valgeirsson (to (Iceland) Breiðablik)
28	FW	SWE	Adam Bark (to Karlstad)
99	FW	IRQ	Ahmed Yasin (to (Iraq) Zakho)

=== Oddevold ===
In:

No.	Pos.	Nation	Player
3	DF	SWE	Erik Hedenquist (from Landskrona)
6	DF	SWE	Jesper Merbom Adolfsson (from Gefle)
12	GK	NOR	Morten Sætra (from (Norway) Levanger)
15	FW	NOR	Adrian Rogulj (on loan from (Netherlands) Emmen)
16	MF	NOR	Emir Derviškadić (on loan from (Norway) Haugesund)
19	FW	SWE	Rasmus Wiedesheim-Paul (on loan from Halmstad)
—	GK	SWE	Noel Hermansson (from Ljungskile)

Out:

No.	Pos.	Nation	Player
3	DF	SWE	Pontus Johansson (to Vänersborg)
6	FW	SWE	Axel Pettersson (free agent)
11	FW	SWE	Hugo Tilly (to Trollhättan)
15	FW	SWE	Assad Al Hamlawi (to (Poland) Śląsk Wrocław)
16	MF	SWE	Noa Bernhardtz (to Qviding)
19	FW	SWE	Ëndrim Salihi (on loan to Herrestad)
22	FW	SWE	Julius Johansson (loan return to Västerås)
29	FW	EST	Kristoffer Grauberg (to (Iceland) Vestri)
33	GK	SWE	Oscar Ekman (to Varberg)
—	MF	SWE	Albion Vitija (free agent)

=== Sundsvall ===
In:

No.	Pos.	Nation	Player
2	DF	SWE	Alexandros Pantelidis (from Vasalund)
7	MF	SWE	Ture Sandberg (on loan from Norrköping)
15	MF	TAI	Miguel Sandberg (from Karlberg)
17	DF	SWE	Nils Eriksson (from Gefle)

Out:

No.	Pos.	Nation	Player
2	DF	GHA	Kojo Peprah Oppong (loan return to Norrköping)
6	MF	GHA	Abdul Halik Hudu (to (Jordan) Al-Wehdat)
7	MF	SWE	Marcus Burman (to Sollentuna)
11	MF	SWE	Jesper Carström (to Karlstad)
12	DF	SWE	Pontus Lindgren (to (Finland) Mariehamn)
13	GK	SWE	Daniel Henareh (on loan to Haninge)
14	FW	SWE	Johan Bengtsson (to (Portugal) Torreense)
16	MF	SWE	Elvis Hansson (on loan to Team TG)
17	FW	SWE	Gustav Nordh (to Brage)
20	MF	SWE	Oliver Grenholm (on loan to Kubikenborg)
30	DF	SWE	Anton Kralj (loan return to Hammarby)
32	DF	SWE	Anton Mossnelid (on loan to Team TG)
—	FW	SWE	Henrik Bäckström (on loan to Skellefteå)
—	MF	SWE	Edwin Dellkrans (on loan to Kubikenborg, previously on loan at Gottne)
—	FW	HAI	Ronaldo Damus (on loan to (United States) Birmingham Legion, previously on loan at (United States) Colorado Springs Switchbacks)
—	MF	SWE	Yonis Shino (to Gefle, previously on loan at IFK Östersund)
—	FW	SWE	Ahmed Gibrill During (to Gefle, previously on loan at Friska Viljor)

=== Östersund ===
In:

No.	Pos.	Nation	Player
2	DF	DEN	Christian Enemark (on loan from (Denmark) Hobro)
4	DF	SWE	Theodor Johansson (from Öster)
6	MF	SWE	Adrian Edqvist (from Gefle)
9	FW	ENG	James Kirby (from Sandviken)
15	MF	SWE	Gideon Granström (on loan from Djurgården, previously on loan at FC Stockholm)
17	MF	SWE	Gustav Odenlind (from Täby)
21	FW	SWE	Edgar Navassardian (from Örebro Syrianska)
30	GK	SWE	Tyree Griffiths (from Olympic)
32	GK	NOR	Frank Stople (on loan from (Norway) Strømsgodset)
—	FW	SWE	Kalipha Jawla (on loan from Djurgården, previously on loan at Utsikten)

Out:

No.	Pos.	Nation	Player
1	GK	GUI	Aly Keita (free agent)
4	DF	NOR	Kristian Novak (free agent)
6	DF	SWE	Jakob Hedenquist (to Umeå)
9	FW	SWE	Sebastian Karlsson Grach (to (Netherlands) Den Bosch)
11	DF	UKR	Mykola Musolitin (to (Poland) Kotwica)
13	DF	NGA	Onahi Ogbu (loan return to (Nigeria) Tiki Taka)
14	FW	GUA	Arquimides Ordóñez (loan return to (United States) Cincinnati)
19	MF	SWE	André Nader (to (Spain) Algeciras)
21	MF	SWE	Simon Kroon (retired)
24	MF	SWE	Henrik Norrby (to Eskilsminne)
25	MF	NOR	Mansour Sinyan (to (Norway) KFUM)

=== Umeå ===
In:

No.	Pos.	Nation	Player
5	DF	SWE	Jakob Hedenquist (from Östersund)
11	MF	SWE	Maximilian Dejene (from Sollentuna)
14	FW	SWE	Elias Cederblad (from Friska Viljor)
16	MF	SWE	Djoseph Bangala (from (Italy) Parma Primavera)
17	DF	SWE	Alfredo Martiatu Nordeman (from Karlberg)
18	MF	SWE	Rinwar Othman (from Sollentuna)
29	FW	SWE	Hugo Lundqvist (from Karlskrona)
31	GK	SWE	Melker Uppenberg (on loan from Elfsborg, previously on loan at Oskarshamn)
—	FW	NOR	Mikael Harbosen Haga (from FBK Karlstad)
—	DF	FRA	Jerry Essombé Mambingo (from Arameisk-Syrianska)
—	FW	NOR	Jørgen Voilås (from (Norway) Egersund)
—	FW	NOR	Eythor Bjørgolfsson (from (Norway) Moss, previously on loan at (Norway) Start)
—	DF	SWE	Daniel Persson (from Karlberg)

Out:

No.	Pos.	Nation	Player
5	MF	SWE	Oscar Kihlgren (to Enköping)
7	MF	SWE	Adam Sandström (to Ariana)
9	FW	SWE	Alexander Larsson (to Ljungskile)
10	FW	GUI	Kerfala Cissoko (to (Finland) Jaro)
11	FW	SWE	William Hofvander (to AIK)
17	FW	SWE	Albin Näslund (to Team TG)
23	MF	SWE	Isak Johansson (on loan to Skellefteå)
29	DF	SWE	Pontus Eriksson (retired)
43	DF	SWE	Hannes Mattsson (on loan to Skellefteå)
—	DF	FRA	Jerry Essombé Mambingo (on loan to Assyriska)
—	MF	SWE	Ludvig Navik (to Oskarshamn, previously on loan at FBK Karlstad)

=== Falkenberg ===
In:

No.	Pos.	Nation	Player
22	FW	SWE	Viktor Ekblom (from Lund)
23	DF	SWE	Alexander Salo (from Norrby)
24	MF	SWE	Hampus Källström (from Torn)
—	MF	SWE	Seif Ali Hindi (from Hammarby U19)

Out:

No.	Pos.	Nation	Player
3	DF	SWE	William Borgryd (to Tvååker)
6	MF	SWE	Edvin Christiansson (on loan to Böljan)
11	FW	SWE	Melwin Kocanovic (on loan to Tvååker)
23	MF	SWE	Rasmus Andersson (free agent)
—	MF	SWE	Oliver Silverholt (loan return to Varberg)
—	MF	SWE	Vincent Bodiroza (to Böljan, previously on loan at Stafsinge)

== See also ==
- 2025 Allsvenskan
- 2025 Superettan
