= Kevin Holmén =

Swedish footballer

Personal information
- Full name: Kevin Kristoffer Holmén
- Date of birth: 13 December 2001 (age 24)
- Height: 1.78 m (5 ft 10 in)
- Position: Midfielder

Team information
- Current team: GAIS
- Number: 18

Youth career
- Annelunds IF
- –2020: IF Elfsborg

Senior career*
Years	Team	Apps	(Gls)
2021–2024	IF Elfsborg	7	(0)
2022	→ Skövde AIK (loan)	16	(1)
2023	→ Örgryte IS (loan)	13	(1)
2024	→ Degerfors IF (loan)	29	(2)
2025–	GAIS	28	(2)
- * Club domestic league appearances and goals as of 8 July 2026

Kevin Holmén (born 13 December 2001) is a Swedish footballer who plays as a midfielder for GAIS in Allsvenskan.

== Career ==
Wikman started his youth career in Annelunds IF. He then played youth football for IF Elfsborg and attended the football gymnasium in Borås. Ahead of the 2021 season he was promoted to the senior team alongside Oliver Zandén, Noah Söderberg and Jack Cooper Love.

He did not play any league games in 2021, but made his Allsvenskan debut in October 2022 against Varberg. Earlier in 2022 he had been loaned to Skövde AIK. In 2023 he was loaned to Örgryte IS, followed by another loan to Degerfors IF in 2024.

On 10 January 2025, Holmén signed a four-year contract with GAIS. His first match came in the 2024–25 Svenska Cupen.

== Personal life ==
Kevin Holmén is a son of Kristoffer Holmén. In 2014, they played a match together for low-level team Annelunds IF. Notably, Kevin Holmén is a nephew of fellow Elfsborg players Samuel Holmén and Sebastian Holmén.

Kevin Holmén was born with a hearing defect. After several surgeries, Holmén entered senior football with hearing in one ear, and played with a hearing aid.
