= Lennartsson =

Lennartsson is a Swedish surname. Notable people with the surname include:

- Benny Lennartsson (born 1942), Swedish football coach
- Jan Lennartsson (born 1981), Swedish handball player
- Jörgen Lennartsson (born 1965), Swedish football manager
- Liselotta Lennartsson (born 1987), Swedish curler
- Petter Lennartsson (born 1988), Swedish footballer
- Stina Lennartsson (born 1997), Swedish footballer
- Tore Lennartsson, (born 1952), Swedish former footballer

== See also ==
- Lenartov
