= Kevin Jensen =

Kevin Jensen may refer to:

- Kevin D. Jensen, member of the South Dakota House of Representatives
- Kevin Jensen (footballer), Swedish footballer
