= Samuel Holmén =

Swedish footballer (born 1984)

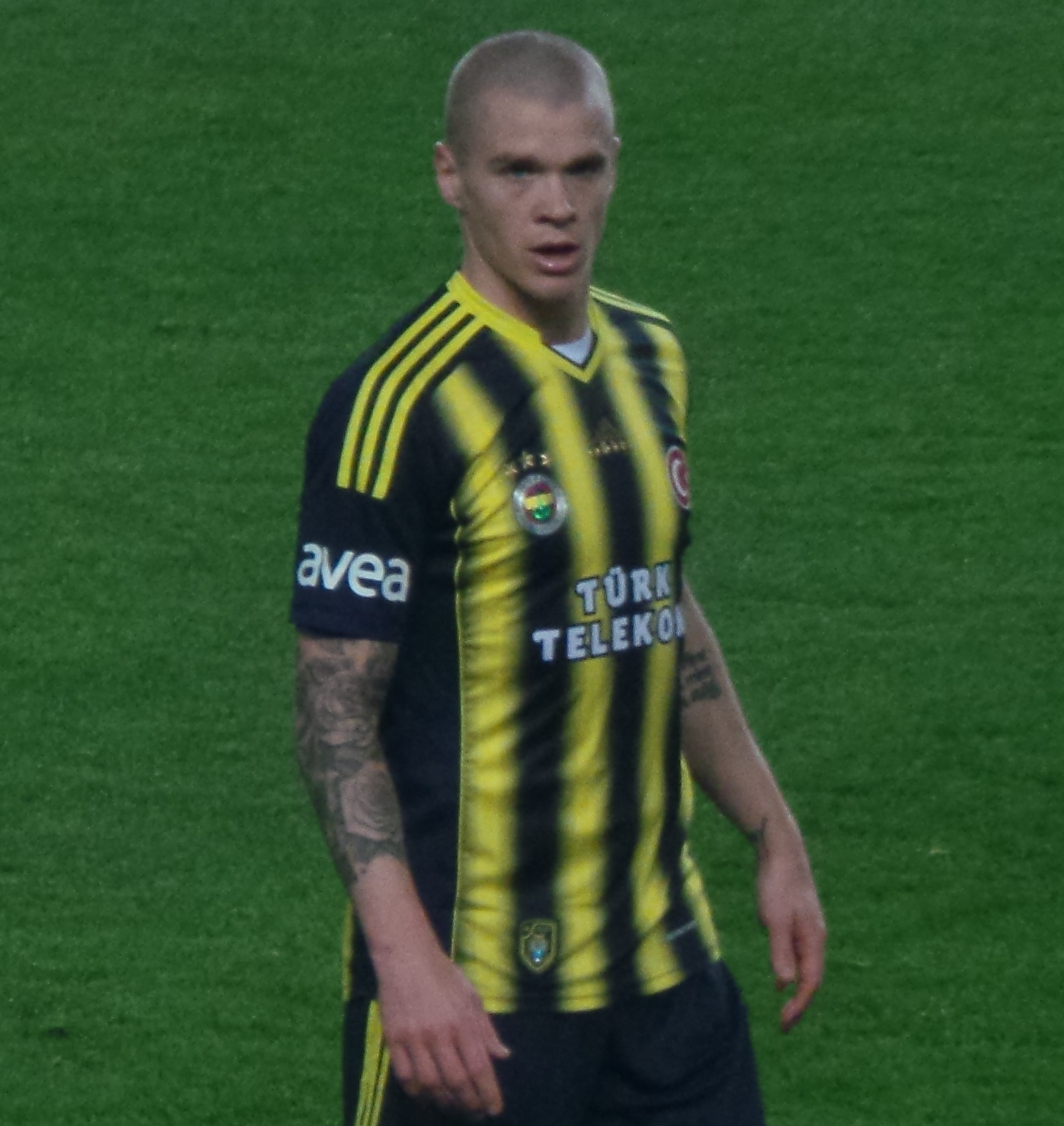
- Holmén playing for Fenerbahçe in 2014

Personal information
- Full name: Samuel Tobias Holmén
- Date of birth: 28 June 1984 (age 42)
- Place of birth: Annelund, Sweden
- Height: 1.78 m (5 ft 10 in)
- Position: Midfielder

Youth career
- 1993–1998: Annelunds IF
- 1998–2002: IF Elfsborg

Senior career*
Years	Team	Apps	(Gls)
2002–2007	IF Elfsborg	112	(18)
2007–2010	Brøndby IF	83	(13)
2010–2013	İstanbul Başakşehir	96	(22)
2013–2016	Fenerbahçe	6	(0)
2014–2015	→ Bursaspor (loan)	27	(4)
2015–2016	→ Konyaspor (loan)	28	(4)
2016–2017	İstanbul Başakşehir	17	(0)
2017–2021	IF Elfsborg	106	(5)
Total		475	(66)

International career
2001	Sweden U17	8	(2)
2002–2003	Sweden U19	10	(0)
2003–2006	Sweden U21	22	(3)
2006–2013	Sweden	32	(2)
- * Club domestic league appearances and goals as of 09:54, 29 August 2021 (UTC)

Samuel Tobias Holmén (born 28 June 1984) is a Swedish former professional footballer who played as a midfielder.

Holmén's favourite position was in the central midfield, and his style of play was that of a box-to-box player, being a good defensive ball winner, as well as a good playmaker and goal scorer.

Starting off his career with IF Elfsborg in 2002, he went on to play in Denmark and Turkey before returning to Elfsborg and Swedish football in 2017. He retired from professional football in 2021.

A full international between 2006 and 2013, he won 32 caps for the Sweden national team and represented his country at UEFA Euro 2012.

== Club career ==
=== IF Elfsborg ===
Holmén was born in Annelund just outside Borås, and started playing football in Annelunds IF. In 1998, he went to IF Elfsborg. After a few years in the youth squad he was promoted to the first squad, and made his debut when he came on as a substitute in the semi-final of the Swedish Cup in September 2002. He quickly became a first team regular, and was considered to be one of the most promising Swedish footballers.

=== Brøndby IF ===
On 30 August 2007 Holmén transferred to Danish Superliga club Brøndby IF signing a four-year contract.

=== İstanbul BB ===
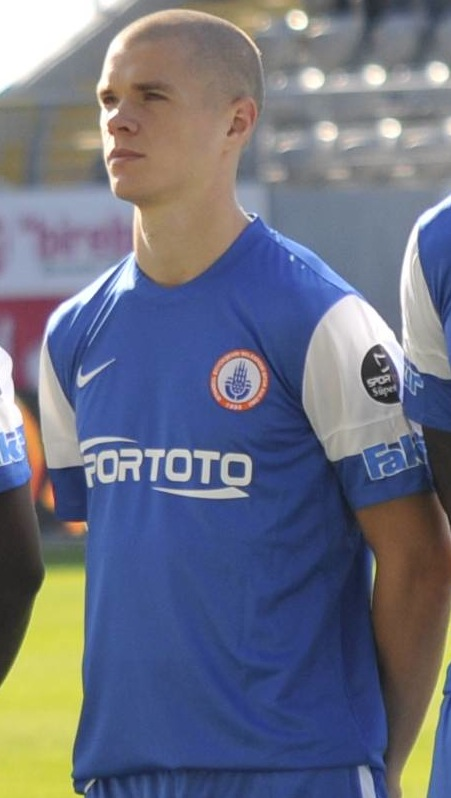
Holmén playing for Istanbul BB

In July 2010, Holmén left Danish side Brøndby IF to sign with Turkish club Büyükşehir Belediyespor. He started 100 matches in the first eleven. His contract ended in June 2013.

=== Fenerbahçe and loans ===
On 18 June 2013, Holmén signed with Fenerbahçe for a three-year deal after successfully passing the medical tests.

In August 2014, Holmén was loaned to Bursaspor for one season.

On 21 August 2015, Holmén was loaned to Konyaspor for one season.

=== Return to İstanbul Başakşehir ===
In June 2016, Holmén signed a two-year contract with İstanbul Başakşehir after his Fenerbahçe contract expired.

=== Return to IF Elfsborg ===
Holmén returned to IF Elfsborg during the 2017 Allsvenskan season. He announced his retirement after the 2021 Allsvenskan season.

== International career ==
Having represented the Sweden U17, U19, and U21 teams, Holmén made his full international debut for Sweden on 11 November 2006 in a friendly 1–0 loss to the Ivory Coast when he came on as a substitute for Petter Hansson in the 85th minute. His first international goal came in a friendly against Costa Rica, scoring the only goal in a 1–0 win on 13 January 2008. His first competitive appearance for Sweden came in a 2010 FIFA World Cup qualifier against Albania on 6 September 2008, when he replaced Kim Källström in the 84th minute of a 0–0 draw. Holmén would go ahead and score his first competitive international goal only four days later on 10 September 2008, in a 2–1 win against Hungary in the same World Cup qualifying campaign.

Holmén was named in Sweden's squad for UEFA Euro 2012, and appeared in the last group stage game against France as Sweden failed to reach the tournament's knockout stage.

== Personal life ==
His brother, Sebastian, is also a professional footballer.

== Career statistics ==
=== International ===
Appearances and goals by national team and year
National team	Year	Apps	Goals
Sweden	2006	1	0
Sweden	2007	3	0
Sweden	2008	8	2
Sweden	2009	9	0
Sweden	2010	2	0
Sweden	2011	1	0
Sweden	2012	7	0
Sweden	2013	1	0
Total		32	2

Scores and results list Sweden's goal tally first.

List of international goals scored by Samuel Holmén

#	Date	Venue	Opponent	Score	Result	Competition
1.	13 January 2008	Estadio Saprissa, San José, Costa Rica	Costa Rica	1–0	1–0	Friendly
2.	10 September 2008	Råsunda Stadium, Stockholm, Sweden	Hungary	2–0	2–1	2010 FIFA World Cup qualification

== Honours ==
IF Elfsborg

- Allsvenskan: 2006
- Swedish Cup: 2003

Brøndby

- Danish Cup: 2008

Fenerbahçe

- Süper Lig: 2013–14
