= Victor Backman =

Victor Backman may refer to:

- Victor Backman (ice hockey) (born 1991), Swedish ice hockey player
- Victor Backman (footballer) (born 2001), Swedish footballer
