= Sebastian Holmén =

Swedish footballer

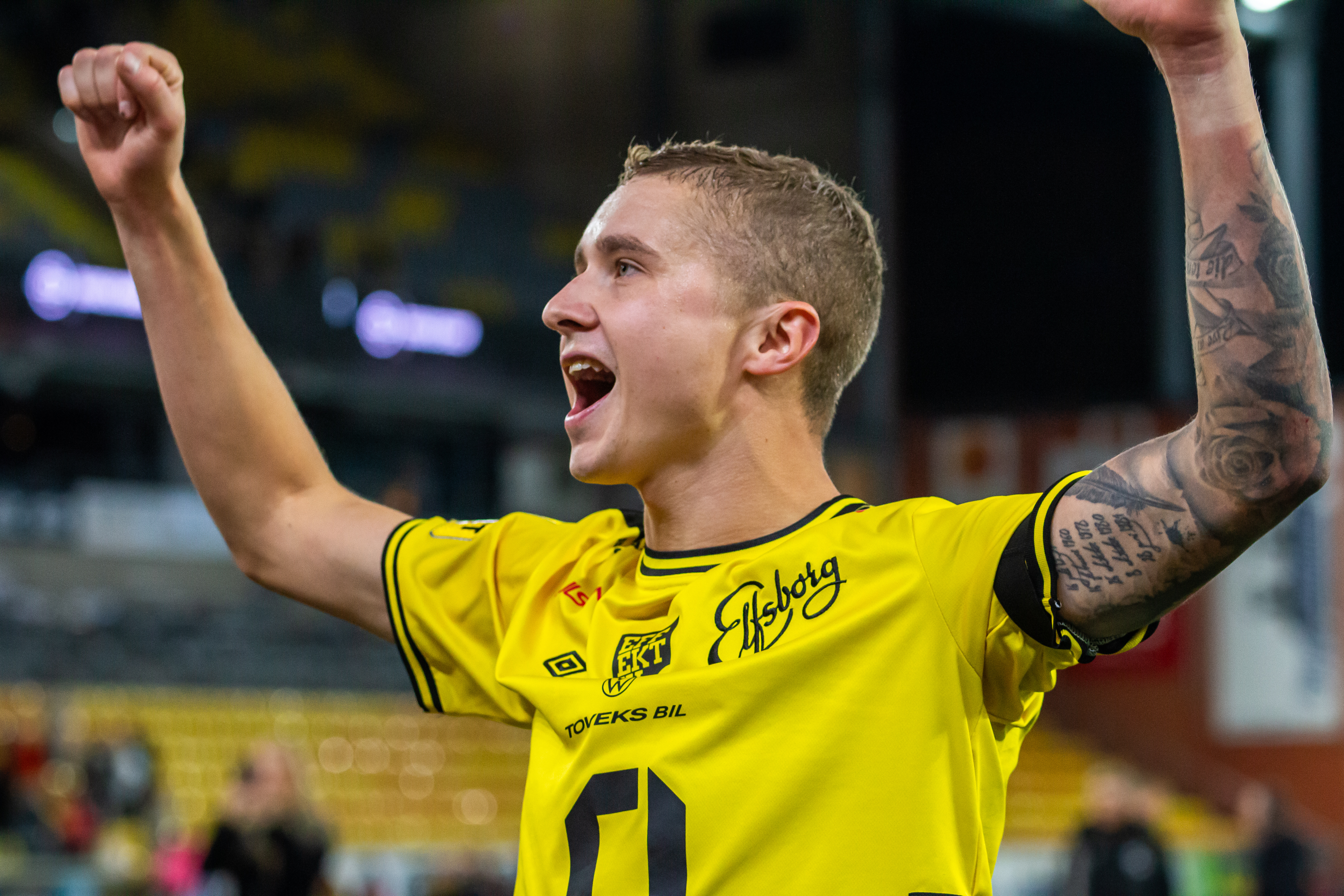

Personal information
- Full name: Rasmus Sebastian Holmén
- Date of birth: 29 April 1992 (age 34)
- Place of birth: Borås, Sweden
- Height: 1.88 m (6 ft 2 in)
- Position: Centre back

Team information
- Current team: IF Elfsborg
- Number: 8

Youth career
- –2007: Annelunds IF
- 2007–2012: IF Elfsborg

Senior career*
Years	Team	Apps	(Gls)
2012–2016	IF Elfsborg	75	(2)
2016–2019	Dynamo Moscow	86	(0)
2019–2021	Willem II	56	(4)
2021–2022	Çaykur Rizespor	33	(0)
2022–	IF Elfsborg	93	(5)

International career
2013–2015	Sweden U21	12	(0)
2015–2020	Sweden	6	(0)
Medal record
Men's football
Representing Sweden
UEFA European Under-21 Championship
Winner	2015 Czech Republic
- * Club domestic league appearances and goals as of 8 July 2026

Rasmus Sebastian Holmén (born 29 April 1992) is a Swedish professional footballer who plays as a centre back for Allsvenskan club IF Elfsborg. He has won six caps for the Sweden national team.

== Club career ==
=== Elfsborg ===
Holmén made his debut in Allsvenskan on 22 April 2013 against Djurgården, replacing injured Jon Jönsson.

=== Dynamo Moscow ===
On 18 February 2016, he moved to Russia on a 3.5-year contract with Dynamo Moscow. On 12 June 2019, he left Dynamo upon the expiration of his contract.

=== Willem II ===
On 24 July 2019, he signed a two-year contract with the Dutch club Willem II.

== International career ==
Holmén was a part of the Sweden U21 team that won the 2015 UEFA European Under-21 Championship.

He made his full international debut for the Sweden national team on 15 January 2015 in a friendly 2–0 win against the Ivory Coast, replacing Johan Mårtensson in the 89th minute. On 16 March 2022, he announced his retirement from international football after having won six caps for his country between 2015 and 2020.

== Personal life ==
Sebastian is the younger brother of the former Sweden national team midfielder Samuel Holmén.

== Career statistics ==
=== Club ===
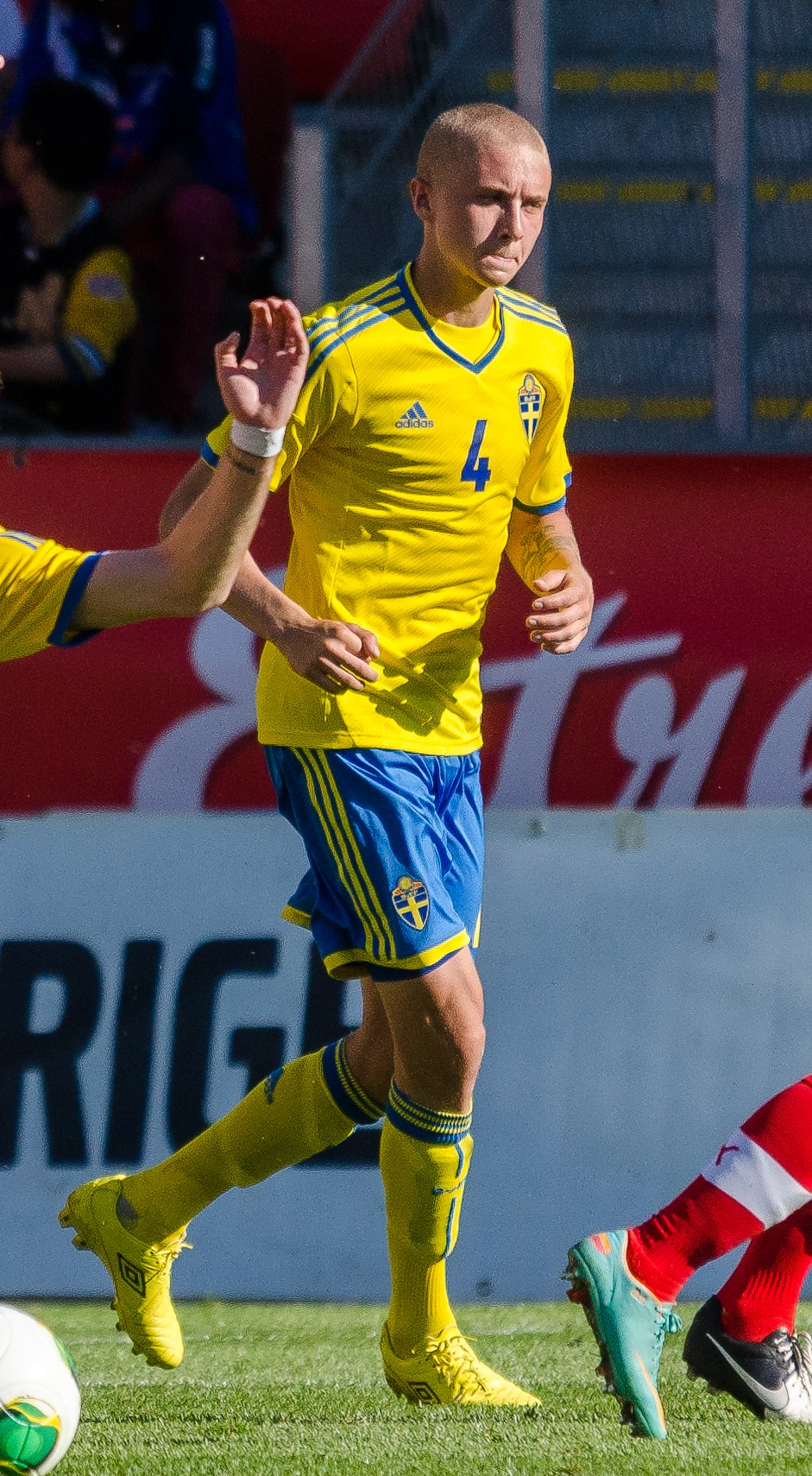
Holmén playing for the Sweden national under-21 football team in 2013

As of 28 November 2023

Appearances and goals by club, season and competition
Club	Season	League			Cup		Continental		Total	
Club	Season	Division	Apps	Goals	Apps	Goals	Apps	Goals	Apps	Goals
Elfsborg	2012	Allsvenskan	0	0	1	0	2	0	3	0
Elfsborg	2013	Allsvenskan	19	1	3	0	6	1	28	2
Elfsborg	2014	Allsvenskan	27	1	7	1	6	2	40	4
Elfsborg	2015	Allsvenskan	29	0	6	0	5	0	40	0
Dynamo Moscow	2015–16	Premier League	10	0	0	0	–		10	0
Dynamo Moscow	2016–17	National League	33	0	3	1	–		36	1
Dynamo Moscow	2017–18	Premier League	23	0	1	0	–		24	0
Dynamo Moscow	2018–19	Premier League	20	0	2	0	–		22	0
Willem II	2019–20	Eredivise	26	1	3	0			29	1
Willem II	2020–21	Eredivise	30	3	1	0	2	0	33	3
Rizespor	2021–22	Süper Lig	33	0					33	0
IF Elfsborg	2022	Allsvenskan	15	0			2	0	17	0
IF Elfsborg	2023	Allsvenskan	29	1					29	1
Career total			294	8	27	2	23	3	344	12

=== International ===
Appearances and goals by national team and year
National team	Year	Apps	Goals
Sweden	2015	2	0
Sweden	2016	2	0
Sweden	2017	0	0
Sweden	2018	0	0
Sweden	2019	0	0
Sweden	2020	2	0
Sweden	2021	0	0
Sweden	2022	0	0
Total		6	0

== Honours ==
Sweden U21

- UEFA European Under-21 Championship: 2015
