= Kalle Joelsson =

Swedish footballer (born 1998)

Personal information
- Full name: Julius Kalle Joelsson
- Date of birth: 21 March 1998 (age 28)
- Place of birth: Sweden
- Height: 1.88 m (6 ft 2 in)
- Position: Goalkeeper

Team information
- Current team: AIK
- Number: 30

Senior career*
| Years | Team | Apps | (Gls) |
| 2017–2024 | Helsingborgs IF | 114 | (0) |
| 2018 | → Ängelholms FF (loan) | 2 | (0) |
| 2025– | AIK | 4 | (0) |

International career^{‡}
| 2015 | Sweden U19 | 1 | (0) |
| 2019 | Sweden U21 | 1 | (0) |
- * Club domestic league appearances and goals as of 8 July 2026 ‡ National team caps and goals as of 7 June 2019

Julius Kalle Joelsson (born 21 March 1998) is a Swedish footballer who plays as a goalkeeper for AIK.
