= Samuel Asoma =

Belgian footballer

Personal information
- Date of birth: 15 July 2002 (age 24)
- Place of birth: Belgium
- Height: 5 ft 8 in (1.73 m)
- Position: Midfielder

Team information
- Current team: Helsingborgs IF
- Number: 6

Youth career
- Club Brugge
- 2022–2023: Union SG U23

Senior career*
Years	Team	Apps	(Gls)
2020–2021	Club NXT	8	(0)
2023	Dalkurd	12	(1)
2024	Västerås SK	1	(0)
2024	→ Trelleborg (loan)	15	(0)
2025–	Helsingborgs IF	32	(0)

International career
2017	Belgium U15	4	(0)
2017–2018	Belgium U16	13	(1)
2018–2019	Belgium U17	9	(0)
2019	Belgium U18	1	(0)
2019–2020	Belgium U19	1	(0)
- * Club domestic league appearances and goals as of 12 November 2026

Samuel Asoma (born 15 July 2002) is a Belgian professional footballer who plays as a midfielder for Swedish side Helsingborgs IF.

== Club career ==
Asoma began his career at the youth academy of Club Brugge. On 22 August 2020, he made his debut for Brugge's reserve side, Club NXT in the Belgian First Division B against RWDM47. He started as NXT lost 0–2.

== Career statistics ==
=== Club ===
As of match played 16 October 2020

Appearances and goals by club, season and competition
Club	Season	League			Cup		Continental		Total	
Club	Season	Division	Apps	Goals	Apps	Goals	Apps	Goals	Apps	Goals
Club NXT	2020–21	Belgian First Division B	6	0	—	—	—	—	6	0
Career total			6	0	0	0	0	0	6	0
