= Filip Trpchevski =

Swedish-Macedonian footballer

Personal information
- Date of birth: 4 May 2003 (age 23)
- Place of birth: Gothenburg, Sweden
- Height: 1.87 m (6 ft 2 in)
- Position: Winger

Team information
- Current team: Brage
- Number: 9

Youth career
- 2009–2015: Backatorps IF
- 2015–2022: Häcken

Senior career*
Years	Team	Apps	(Gls)
2022–2024	Häcken	10	(0)
2024	→ Utsikten (loan)	14	(5)
2024	→ Örgryte (loan)	8	(1)
2025–	Brage	43	(11)

International career
2018–2019	North Macedonia U16	5	(2)
2019	North Macedonia U17	7	(1)
2020	North Macedonia U19	3	(0)
2021–2024	North Macedonia U21	7	(1)
- * Club domestic league appearances and goals as of 12 November 2026

Filip Trpchevski (Macedonian: Филип Трпчевски; born 4 May 2003) is a professional footballer who plays as a winger for IK Brage. Born in Sweden, he is a youth international for North Macedonia.

== Club career ==
A youth product of Backatorps IF, Trpchevski moved to Häcken's academy in 2015. He made his professional debut with them in a 2–1 Allsvenskan win over Degerfors IF on 9 April 2022. In May 2022, after 6 appearances in 8 games for the club he suffered a cruciate ligament injury, prematurely ending his debut season.

On 11 February 2025, it was confirmed that Trpchevski had joined Superettan club IK Brage.

== International career ==
Born in Sweden, Trpchevski is of Macedonian descent. He is a youth international for North Macedonia, having represented them from U16 to U20 levels.

== Honours ==
BK Häcken

- Allsvenskan: 2022
