= Ljung and Annelund =

Locality in Herrljunga, Sweden

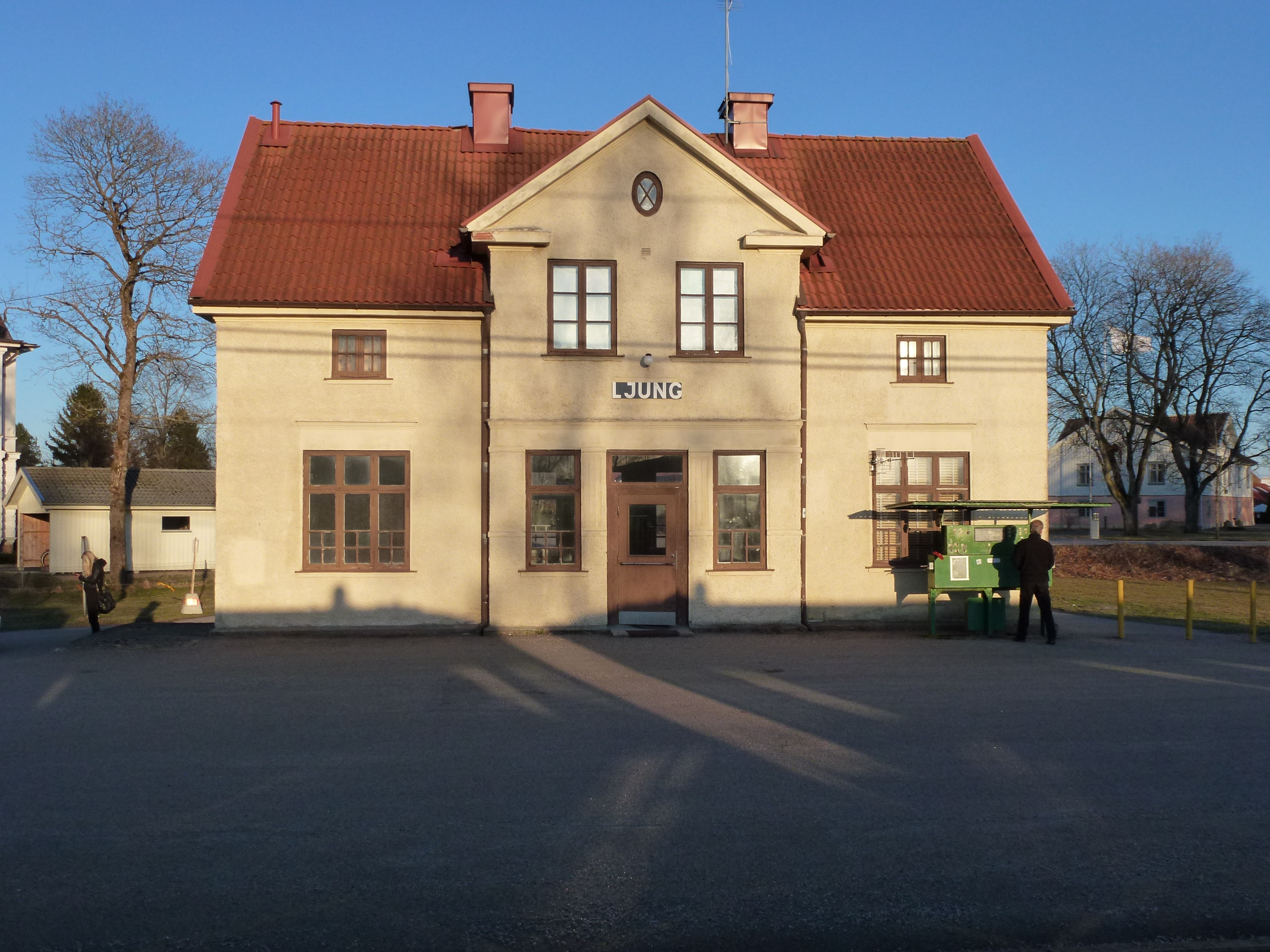
- Ljung station building

- Location within Västra Götaland Location within Sweden
- Coordinates: 57°59′21″N 13°4′37″E
- Country: Sweden
- Province: Västergötland
- County: Västra Götaland County
- Municipality: Herrljunga Municipality

Area
  - Total: 1.84 km^{2} (0.71 sq mi)

Population (31 December 2020)
  - Total: 1,215
  - Density: 660/km^{2} (1,710/sq mi)
- Time zone: UTC+1 (CET)
  - Summer (DST): UTC+2 (CEST)

Ljung and Annelund (Swedish: Ljung och Annelund) is a locality situated in Herrljunga Municipality, Västra Götaland County, Sweden. It had 1,215 inhabitants in 2020. The locality was formed by Statistics Sweden from the separate localities of Ljung and Annelund between 2010 and 2015. Mörlanda is also a name used within the locality, particularly in connection with Annelund, which was historically known by that name.

The locality is home to a train station named Ljung on the Älvsborg Line.

== Sports ==
The following sports clubs are located in Ljung and Annelund:

- Annelunds IF
