= Sandvikens IF =

Swedish football club

- Full name: Sandvikens Idrottsförening
- Nicknames: Järngänget (The Iron Gang); Stålmännen (The Steel Men); Rödvästarna (The Red Vests)
- Founded: 1899; 127 years ago
- Ground: Jernvallen, Sandviken
- Capacity: 7,000
- Chairman: Peter Svensson
- Head coach: Thomas Lagerlöf
- League: Superettan
- 2025: 10th of 16
- Website: www.sandvikensiffotboll.se
Home colours	Away colours	Third colours

Sandvikens Idrottsförening, commonly known as Sandvikens IF, is a Swedish football club located in Sandviken. Formerly believed to have been founded in 1918 the club announced in 2026 that through historical research it had been discovered that the actual founding year was 1899. Sandvikens IF are affiliated to the Gestriklands Fotbollförbund and play their home games at Jernvallen.

The club has played 21 seasons in the top Swedish division Allsvenskan but is currently part of second tier Superettan.

== History ==
The 1904 IK Kronan team who became the first ever Sandvikens IF football team that same year.

Sandvikens IF was created in 1899 when cross-country skiing club Sandvikens Sportklubb and ice skating club Sandvikens Allmänna Skridskoklubb merged. In 1904 football was added to their activities as they merged with IK Kronan and thus acquired their football team.

When the new swedish football league system began in 1925 with Allsvenskan as its top division Sandviken started off in the second tier. In 1929 they qualified for promotion to the top level for the first time and as the first ever company town club to have done so. The 1930s became the first of two golden eras for the club with one third place and two fourth place finishes in Allsvenskan. Thus giving the club one small silver and two bronze medals, as it is the tradition in swedish football that the top four clubs are awarded medals each season.

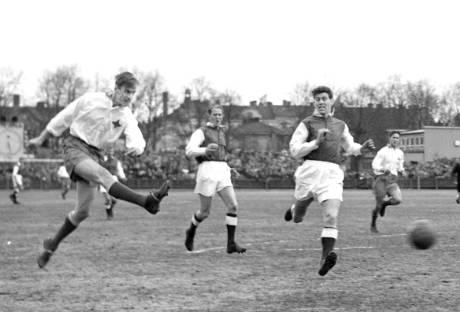
Sandviken playing a 1956–57 Allsvenskan game at home against IFK Norrköping.

The second golden era came during the 1950s. Under the guidance of foreign managers Dai Astley and Antonio Durán the club managed to re-establish itself in Allsvenskan and win another bronze medal. During this period Sandviken also set the record for their highest ever home attendance with 20,088 people watching a home game against IFK Norrköping. At the end of the 1961 Allsvenskan the club was relegated and has not returned to the top division since.

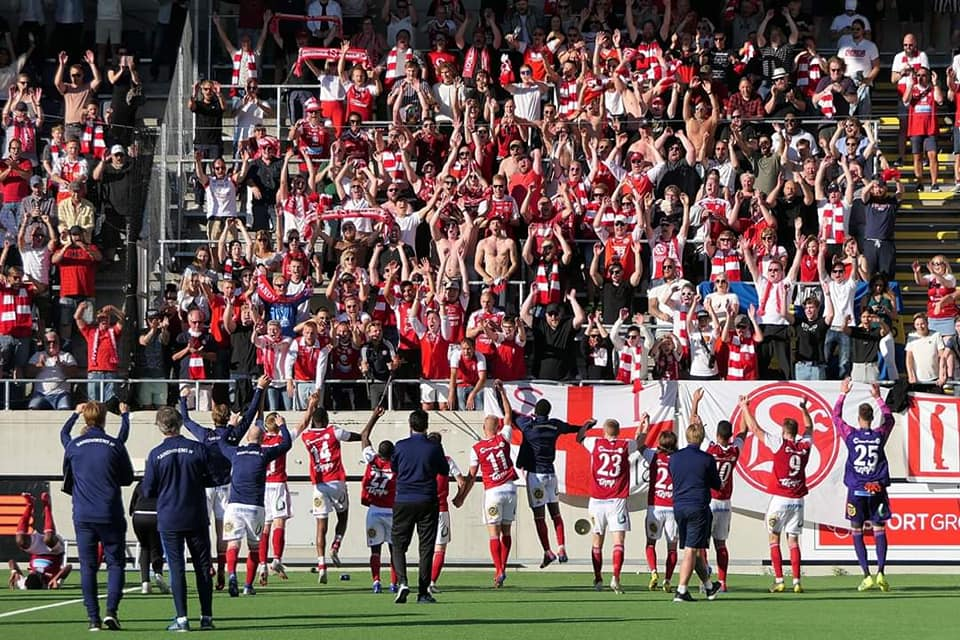
Players and supporters celebrating a 2019 derby win against Gefle IF.

At the start of the 2000s Sandvikens IF was in crisis and according to the chairman "at the brink of ruin" with an impending bankruptcy due to debts to vendors, the municipality and the Swedish Enforcement Authority. After the clubs finances had been stabilized Sandviken achieved promotion in 2023 back to the second tier of swedish football Superettan for the first time in 30 years.

== Trivia ==
As Sandviken is an industrial community, dominated by the steel and metal corporation Sandvik, the team has been much influenced by this. The name of the home ground, Jernvallen, would translate approximately as The Iron Ground, while the nicknames Järngänget and Stålmännen are self-explaining in Swedish ("The Iron gang" and "The Men of Steel"). Stålmännen has a double meaning, as it also is the plural form of Stålmannen, the Swedish name for Superman.

== Kit ==
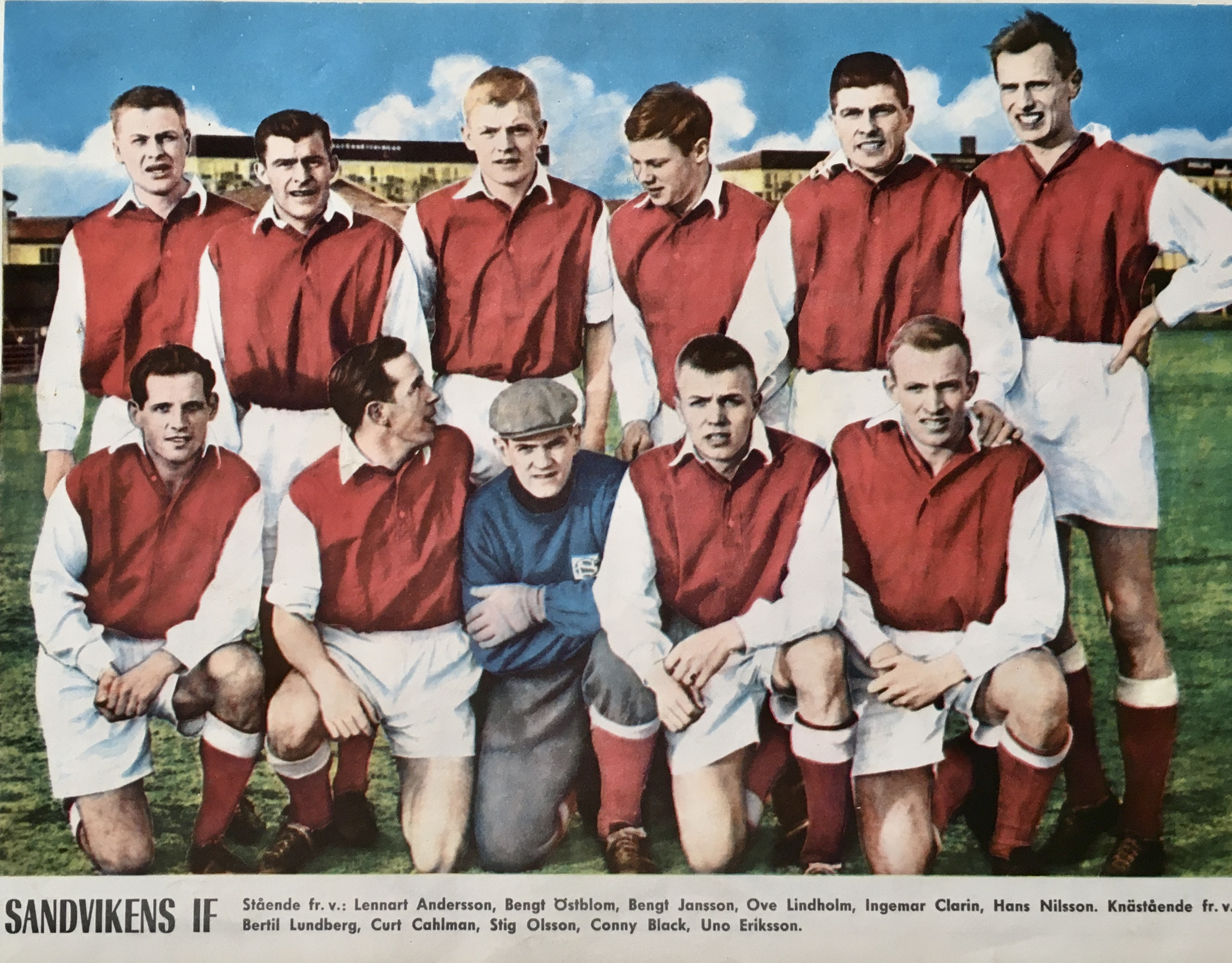
The 1960 Sandvikens IF team wearing the clubs classic home kit.

Sandviken play in red shirts with white sleeves and shorts. The club had initially played in black and white colors but wanted to switch to something more colorful in the 1930s. The player Bertil Ericsson suggested that they should adopt the colors of his favorite club Arsenal F.C. and the members of the club held a vote where they approved of the change.

In 2020 Sandvikens IF signed an expanded deal with their long term kit supplier Adidas.

Period	Kit manufacturer	Shirt sponsor (chest)
2020–	(Germany) Adidas	Sandvik

== Recent seasons ==
Summary of the ten most recent seasons for Sandvikens IF:

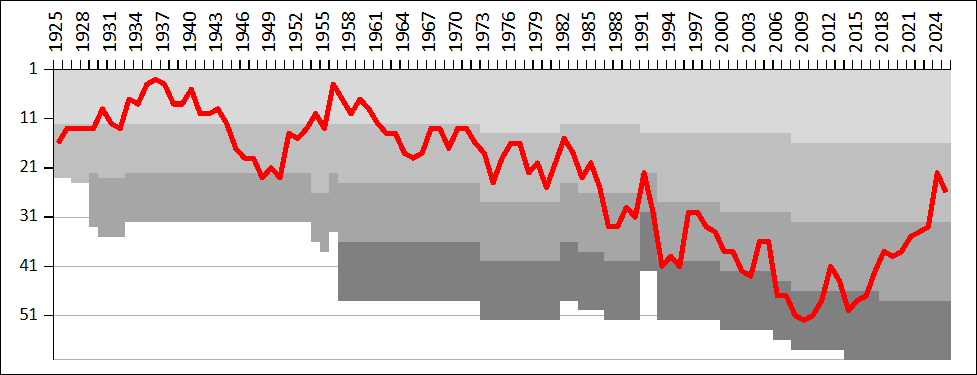
A chart showing the progress of Sandvikens IF through the swedish football league system. The different shades of gray represent league divisions.

Season	Division	Tier	Pos	Pl	W	D	L	+	-	P	Cup	Attendances
2016	Division 2	4	↑ 1	26	22	2	2	95	19	68	2nd round	694
2017	Ettan	3	10	26	9	5	12	35	41	32	1st round	671
2018	Ettan	3	6	30	12	9	9	47	39	45	2nd round	526
2019	Ettan	3	7	30	12	7	11	52	47	43	Group stage	790
2020	Ettan	3	6	30	16	9	5	65	33	57	Group stage	0
2021	Ettan	3	3	30	17	7	6	62	34	58	2nd round	272
2022	Ettan	3	2	30	20	5	5	82	33	65	2nd round	654
2023	Ettan	3	↑ 1	30	20	5	5	77	32	65	2nd round	907
2024	Superettan	2	6	30	12	7	11	49	41	43	Group stage	1,511
2025	Superettan	2	10	30	12	5	13	36	47	41	Group stage	1,285

== Stadium ==
Sandvikens IF play their home games at Jernvallen, an area containing stadiums for multiple sports. Originally built in 1939 the old football stadium hosted two games at the 1958 FIFA World Cup. In 1991 it was converted into a bandy arena and the football was moved to a neighbouring pitch with a newly built small 700-seater stand. In 2026 the municipality announced their plans to build an additional stand so that the club could comply with the stadium requirements for playing in Superettan for which they have previously been given a temporary exemption.

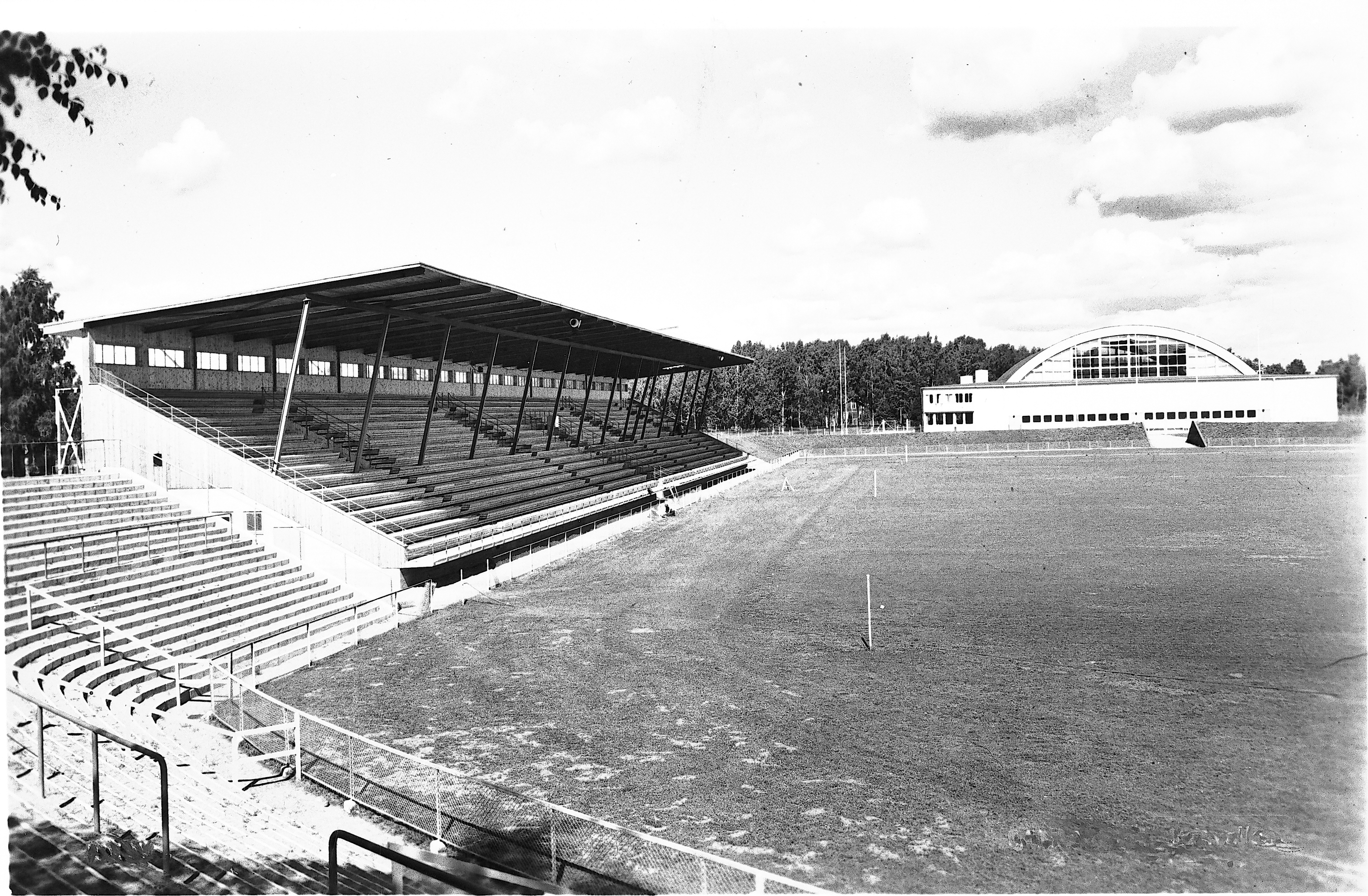
Jernvallen football stadium in 1941.

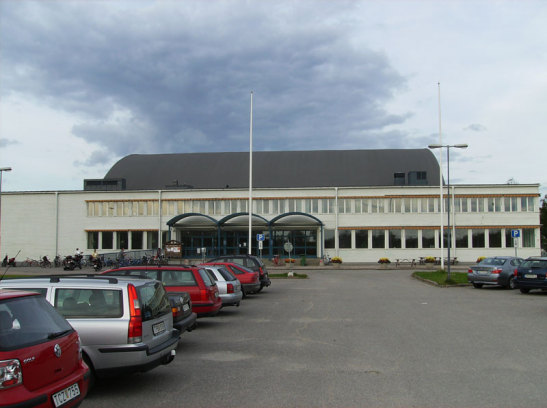
Indoor hall which is part of the Jernvallen area.

== Current squad ==
As of 14 September 2026

Note: Flags indicate national team as defined under FIFA eligibility rules; some limited exceptions apply. Players may hold more than one non-FIFA nationality.

No.	Pos.	Nation	Player
1	GK	SWE	Hannes Sveijer
2	DF	SWE	Gustav Thörn
3	DF	SWE	Nino Geiger
4	DF	SWE	Viggo van der Laan
5	MF	SWE	Oskar Löfström
6	MF	SWE	Liam Vabö
7	MF	SWE	Johan Arvidsson
8	MF	SWE	Karl Bohm
9	FW	DEN	Christian Wagner
11	MF	SWE	Victor Backman
12	MF	USA	Alan Carleton
13	DF	SWE	Isac Lindholm
14	MF	SWE	Mohammed Mohammed
15	MF	SWE	Fabian Andersson
16	DF	GHA	Mohammed Sadat Abubakari

No.	Pos.	Nation	Player
17	DF	SWE	Wilhelm Nilsson
18	DF	USA	Chris Rogers
19	FW	SWE	Anomnachi Chidi
20	FW	FIN	Nicholas Vainio
21	DF	SWE	Adam Kiani
22	MF	SWE	Daniel Bergman
23	DF	SWE	Kasper Harletun
24	MF	NOR	Yabets Yaliso Yaya
25	DF	CIV	Ilias Sangare
26	DF	SWE	Linus Tagesson
27	GK	SWE	Adrian Persson
28	MF	SWE	Anton Lund
29	GK	SWE	Mahmoud Kiki Kharsi
30	GK	SWE	Otto Lindell

=== Out on loan ===
Note: Flags indicate national team as defined under FIFA eligibility rules; some limited exceptions apply. Players may hold more than one non-FIFA nationality.

No.	Pos.	Nation	Player
—	FW	SWE	William Thellsson (at Östers IF until 30 November 2026)

=== Notable players ===
The following players were chosen by local newspaper Arbetarbladet as the greatest Sandvikens IF players of all time:

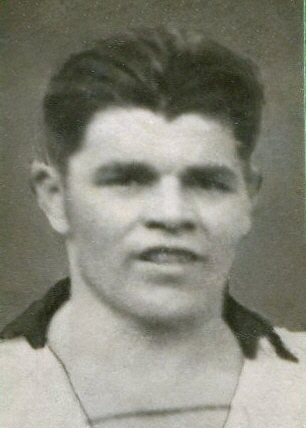
Forward Gösta Dunker represented the Sweden men's national football team at the 1934 FIFA World Cup.

Name	Years
(Sweden) Gösta Dunker	1922–1942
(Sweden) Einar Snitt	1929–1940
(Sweden) Bertil Ericsson	1933–1944
(Sweden) Fred Eklöf	1942–1944, 1953–1958
(Sweden) Arne Hodin	1953–1961
(Sweden) Lennart Andersson	1955–1961
(Sweden) Stig Olsson	1953–1961
(Sweden) Rolf Zetterlund	1968–1971
(Sweden) Leif Jonsson	1961–1976
(Sweden) Ronald Åman	1973–1975
(Sweden) Jan Thunell	197?–1982
(Sweden) Kim Källström	Youth player

== Management ==
=== Technical staff ===
As of 11 September 2026

Name	Role
(Sweden) Thomas Lagerlöf	Head coach
(Sweden) Elias Gärdh	Assistant coach
(Sweden) Jonas Rosén	Assistant coach
(Sweden) Elvin Tahami	Goalkeeping coach
(Italy) Giuseppe Morelato	Fitness coach
(Sweden) Jens Engqvist	Team leader
(Sweden) Ahmad Sheikha	Equipment manager
(Sweden) Rolf Lingvall	Equipment manager

=== Previous Managers ===
- (Sweden) Justus Gustavsson (1934)
- (Sweden) Axel Berglund (1936)
- (Scotland) John Nicholson (1938)
- (Wales) Dai Astley (1955–1957)
- (Sweden) (Spain) Antonio Durán (1958–1960)
- (Sweden) Fred Eklöf (1961)
- (Sweden) (Hungary) Emil Firics (1962)
- (Sweden) Stig Hedström and (Sweden) Jan Ekström (1963)
- (Sweden) Stig Hedström and (Sweden) Arne Hodin (1964)
- (Sweden) Ynge Berglund (1965)
- (Austria) Josef Stroh (1966)
- (Sweden) Gunnar Jansson (1967–1968)
- (Sweden) (Hungary) Otto Dombos (1969–1971)
- (Sweden) Rune Karlsson (1972)
- (Sweden) (England) Sid Huntley (1973)
- (Sweden) (North Macedonia) Vanco Markovski (1974)
- (Sweden) Rolf Olsson and (Sweden) Dan Nordfeldt (1975–1977)
- (Sweden) (Hungary) Otto Dombos and (Sweden) Dan Nordfeldt (1978–1980)
- (Sweden) Thomas Nordahl (1981–1984)
- (Sweden) Rolf Käck (1985–1986)
- (Sweden) Lars-Göran Berglund and (Sweden) Hans Garefelt (1987)
- (Sweden) Tore Lennartsson (1988–1989)
- (Sweden) Göran Vestermark and (Sweden) Jan Hellström (1990–1992)
- (Sweden) Jan Hellström and (Sweden) Mats Mossberg (1993–1994)
- (Scotland) Stuart McManus and (Sweden) Lennart Hedenström (1995)
- (Scotland) Stuart McManus and (Sweden) Mats Axelsson (1996–1998)
- (Sweden) Christer Andersson (1999–2000)
- (Sweden) Sulo Vaattovaara (2000–2002)
- (Sweden) Tony Jennevret (2002)
- (Sweden) Dennis Berglund (2003–2005)
- (Sweden) Jimmy Haaranen (2006–2008)
- (Sweden) John Wall (2008–2009)
- (Sweden) Peter Bergqvist (2009)
- (Sweden) Tony Andersson (2010–2013)
- (Sweden) Johan Forslöf (2013)
- (Sweden) Anders Boman (2013–2014)
- (Sweden) Stefan Lundin (2015–2017)
- (Sweden) Pelle Olsson (2017–2020)
- (Sweden) Martin Falk (2021)
- (Sweden) Thomas Gabrielsson (2021–2022)
- (Sweden) (Bosnia and Herzegovina) Eldar Abdulic (2023–2025)

== Achievements ==
- Allsvenskan:
  - Best placement (3rd): 1935–36 (Small silver medal)
