= FC Arlanda =

- Founded: 2004
- Ground: Midgårdsvallen, Märsta
- Capacity: 2,000
- League: Ettan
- 2026: 3rd of 16

FC Arlanda is a Swedish association football club from Märsta, Sigtuna Municipality.

The club was founded as Viña del Mar before taking the name Viña/Valsta FF. Ahead of the 2008 season the name was changed to FC Arlanda to avoid connotations with Valsta Syrianska. The name was later reverted to Viña del Mar at the behest of club members belonging to the Chilean diaspora, but yet again changed to FC Arlanda ahead of the 2015 season.

The men's football team reached the Division 2, the fourth tier of Swedish football, in 2021. Being relegated back to the fifth tier, Arlanda reached the Division 2 again, placing 4th in 2023. In 2024, the team achieved a historic promotion to the 2025 Ettan, Sweden's third tier.

The team also reached the second round of the Swedish Cup in 2026.

== Current squad ==
As of 1 September 2026

Note: Flags indicate national team as defined under FIFA eligibility rules; some limited exceptions apply. Players may hold more than one non-FIFA nationality.

No.	Pos.	Nation	Player
1	GK	SWE	Adam Smedberg Lagh
2	DF	SWE	Carl Norberg
3	DF	SWE	Hjalmar Fredricson (on loan from Djurgården U19)
4	DF	SWE	Michael Aslan
5	MF	SWE	Oscar Bergstedt
6	MF	SYR	Mark Gorgos
7	FW	SWE	Saifur Rehman
8	MF	SWE	Yoas Yemane
10	MF	SWE	Anton Charbachi
11	MF	SWE	Muktar Ahmed
12	MF	FIN	Ludvig Nyman
14	FW	SWE	Andreas Hansen

No.	Pos.	Nation	Player
15	FW	SWE	Isac Antholm
16	MF	SWE	John Drugge
18	FW	SWE	Joel Carlsson
19	FW	SWE	Samuel Dawid Rydz
20	DF	SWE	Isac Giordano Eriksson
21	FW	SWE	Leonard Kleist
22	MF	SWE	Mario Butros
24	MF	SWE	Ahmed Saeed (on loan from Djurgården)
25	FW	SYR	Ryan Koroma
26	GK	SWE	Milad Hanna
27	DF	SWE	Erik Johansson Olsson
30	GK	JPN	Ayden Karo
