= Tore Lennartsson =

Swedish footballer and manager

Tore "Turbo" Lennartsson, (born November 29, 1952) is a Swedish former footballer. He was known as a fast runner and scorer. He was playing in the team of Gefle IF that advanced to the Swedish premier league Allsvenskan in 1982.

Lennartsson managed Sandvikens IF and now works as a sport teacher in Gävle and as an instructor at Gästrikland's football federation.

== Clubs ==
- Skoglunds IF, the parent club
- Örebro SK, 1972–1981
- Gefle IF, 1982–84
