= Imam Jagne =

Swedish footballer

Personal information
- Full name: Imam Seedy Jagne
- Date of birth: 1 October 2003 (age 23)
- Place of birth: The Gambia
- Height: 1.80 m (5 ft 11 in)
- Position: Midfielder

Team information
- Current team: A.E. Kifisia (on loan from IFK Göteborg)
- Number: 19

Youth career
- –2015: Solväders FC
- 2015–2019: BK Häcken
- 2020–2022: Everton

Senior career*
Years	Team	Apps	(Gls)
2019–2020	BK Häcken	1	(0)
2023–2024	Mjällby AIF	37	(4)
2025–	IFK Göteborg	30	(1)
2026–	→ A.E. Kifisia (loan)	5	(0)

International career^{‡}
2019–2020	Sweden U17	10	(0)
2021–2023	Sweden U19	3	(0)
2024	Sweden U21	2	(0)
- * Club domestic league appearances and goals as of 19:15, 19 September 2026 (UTC) ‡ National team caps and goals as of 17:12, 16 October 2024 (UTC)

Imam Seedy Jagne (/dʒɑːn/, JAHN; born 1 October 2003) is a Swedish professional footballer who plays as a midfielder for Super League Greece club A.E. Kifisia, on loan from Allsvenskan club IFK Göteborg.

Born in The Gambia, he has represented Sweden at youth international level.

== Club career ==
Jagne started playing football for Gothenburg based side Solväders FC before joining Häcken at the age of 12. Jagne made his professional debut for Häcken on 2 November 2019, coming on as a substitute in stoppage time during 4–1 loss to Hammarby.

On 4 October 2020, he joined Premier League club Everton on a three-year deal. He left the club a year early in the summer of 2022.

He returned to train with his former club Häcken before joining Mjällby in January 2023 on a three-year deal.

In December 2024, Jagne joined IFK Göteborg on a four-year deal.

On 16 July 2026, Jagne joined Greek side A.E. Kifisia on a yearly loan.

== International career ==
Jagne has represented Sweden at under-17 level. In September 2021, he made his debut for Sweden U19, playing in a friendly against Finland U19.

== Personal life ==
Born in The Gambia, Jagne moved to Sweden at the age of 6.
