= Herrljunga Municipality =

Herrljunga Municipality Herrljunga kommun
- Municipality
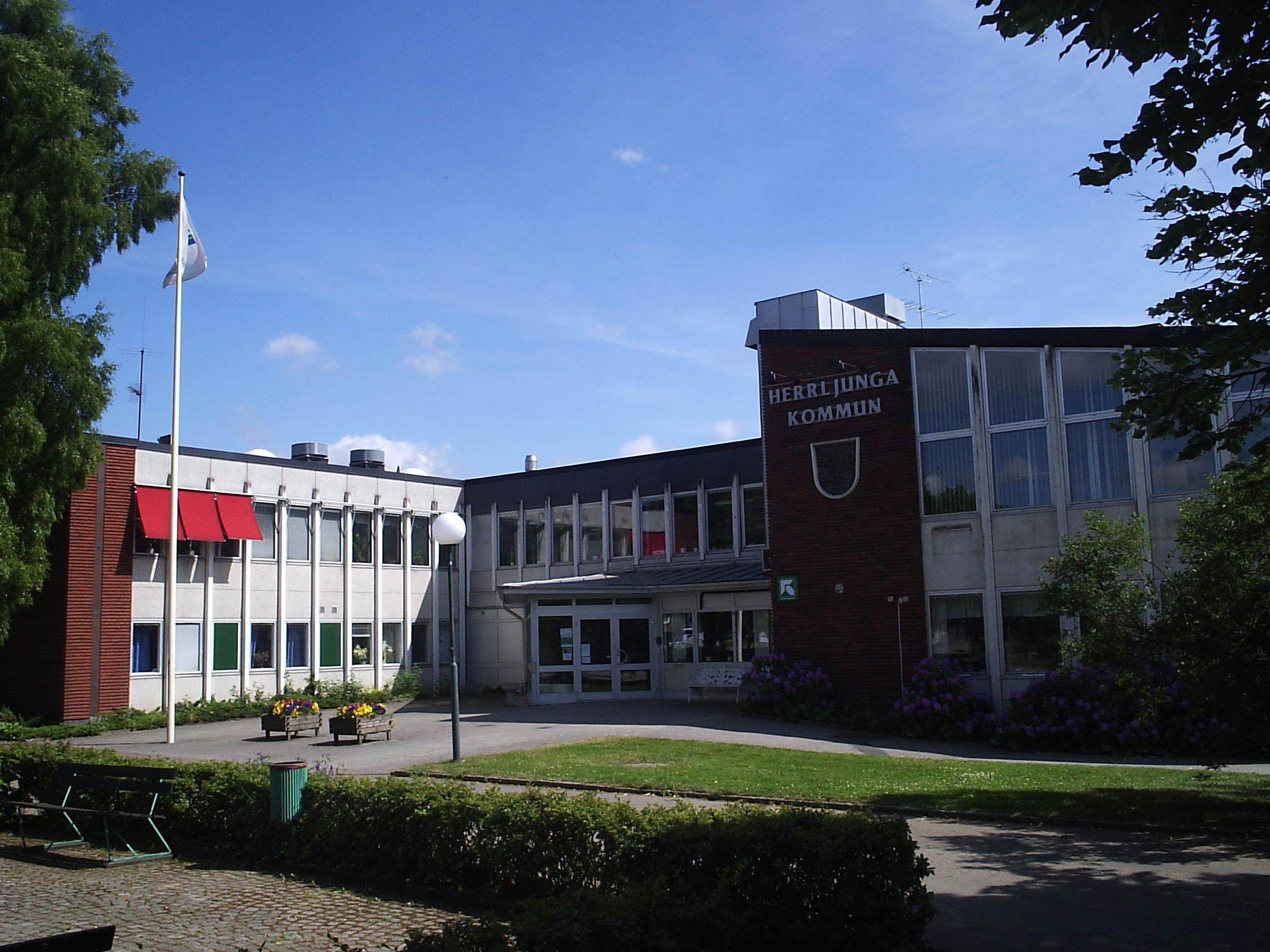
- Herrljunga town hall

- Coat of arms

- Coordinates: 58°05′N 13°02′E
- Country: Sweden
- County: Västra Götaland County
- Seat: Herrljunga

Area
  - Total: 509.54 km^{2} (196.73 sq mi)
  - Land: 497.55 km^{2} (192.11 sq mi)
  - Water: 11.99 km^{2} (4.63 sq mi)
- Area as of 1 January 2014.

Population (30 June 2025)
  - Total: 9,507
  - Density: 19.11/km^{2} (49.49/sq mi)
- Time zone: UTC+1 (CET)
  - Summer (DST): UTC+2 (CEST)
- ISO 3166 code: SE
- Province: Västergötland
- Municipal code: 1466
- Website: www.herrljunga.se

Herrljunga Municipality (Swedish: Herrljunga kommun) is a municipality in Västra Götaland County in western Sweden. Its seat is located in the town of Herrljunga.

The local government reform of 1952 formed two municipalities, Herrljunga and Gäsene, in the area. Before that the number was 22. In 1974 they were merged to form the present entity.

== Localities ==
55% of the population live in built-up areas. The largest of them are:

- Annelund
- Fåglavik
- Herrljunga
- Hudene
- Ljung

== Demographics ==
This is a demographic table based on Herrljunga Municipality's electoral districts in the 2022 Swedish general election sourced from SVT's election platform, in turn taken from SCB official statistics.

In total there were 9,493 residents, including 7,313 Swedish citizens of voting age. 42.5% voted for the left coalition and 55.8% for the right coalition.

Location	Residents	Citizen adults	Left vote	Right vote	Employed	Swedish parents	Foreign heritage	Income SEK	Degree
Location			%	%					
Gäsene Ö	1,385	1,110	30.5	67.2	86	91	9	24,931	28
Herrljunga C	2,560	1,877	50.6	47.8	76	73	27	22,599	29
Herrljunga V	1,829	1,425	46.4	52.8	90	89	11	27,265	33
Herrljunga Ö	1,563	1,251	40.4	57.9	82	87	13	24,824	30
Ljung	2,156	1,650	40.6	57.7	82	87	13	24,651	28
Source: SVT

== Politics ==
Since the 2022 election the municipal government is controlled by a majority consisting of the Social Democrats, Left Party, Centre Party and Liberals with Mats Palm of the Social Democrats as commissioner. The municipal council of Herrljunga has 34 seats.
