= Lenartov =

- Municipality
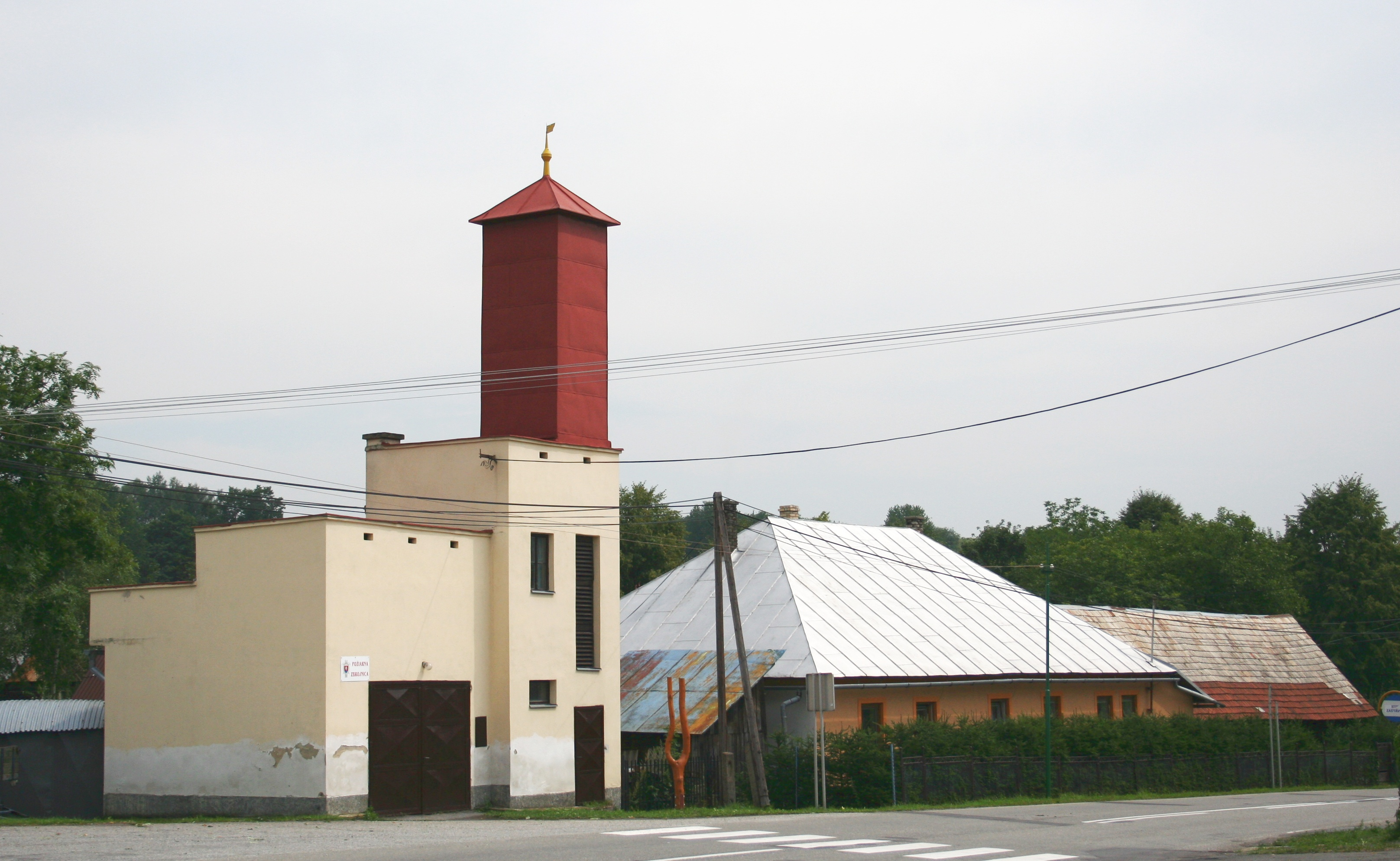

- Flag

- Location of Lenartov in the Prešov Region Location of Lenartov in Slovakia
- Coordinates: 49.32°N 21.03°E
- Country: Slovakia
- Region: Prešov Region
- District: Bardejov District
- First mentioned: 1543

Area
  - Total: 14.76 km^{2} (5.70 sq mi)
- Elevation: 468 m (1,535 ft)

Population (2025)
  - Total: 1,261
- Time zone: UTC+1 (CET)
  - Summer (DST): UTC+2 (CEST)
- Postal code: 860 6
- Area code: +421 54
- Vehicle registration plate (until 2022): BJ
- Website: lenartov.sk

Lenartov is a village and municipality in Bardejov District in the Prešov Region of north-east Slovakia.

== History ==
In historical records the village was first mentioned in 1543.

== Geography ==
The municipality lies at an altitude of 468 metres (1,535 ft) and covers an area of 14.76 km^{2} (5.70 sq mi) (2025).

== Population ==
Population statistic (10 years)
| Year | 1995 | 2005 | 2015 | 2025 |
|---|---|---|---|---|
| Count | 809 | 1005 | 1110 | 1261 |
| Difference | | +24.22% | +10.44% | +13.60% |

Population statistic
| Year | 2024 | 2025 |
|---|---|---|
| Count | 1232 | 1261 |
| Difference | | +2.35% |

It has a population of 1261 people (31 December 2025).

=== Ethnicity ===
Census 2021 (1+ %)
| Ethnicity | Number | Fraction |
|---|---|---|
| Slovak | 1103 | 94.27% |
| Romani | 641 | 54.78% |
| Not found out | 104 | 8.88% |
| Total | 1170 | |

In year 2021 was 1170 people by ethnicity 1103 as Slovak, 641 as Romani, 104 as Not found out, 9 as Rusyn, 3 as Czech, 2 as Austrian, 1 as Polish and 1 as Hungarian.

Note on population: The difference values of population numbers in the table "Population statistic" and in the sections "Ethnicity" & "Religion" is caused by the use of various statistical methods.

The majority of the municipality's population consists of the local Roma community. In 2019, they constituted an estimated 66% of the local population.

=== Religion ===
Census 2021 (1+ %)
| Religion | Number | Fraction |
|---|---|---|
| Roman Catholic Church | 984 | 84.1% |
| None | 87 | 7.44% |
| Greek Catholic Church | 52 | 4.44% |
| Not found out | 33 | 2.82% |
| Total | 1170 | |

In year 2021 was 1170 people by religion 984 from Roman Catholic Church, 87 from None, 52 from Greek Catholic Church, 33 from Not found out, 7 from Eastern Orthodox Church, 4 from Christian Congregations in Slovakia, 2 from Evangelical Church and 1 from Paganism and natural spirituality.
