= Hannes Sveijer =

Swedish footballer

Personal information
- Full name: Hannes Åke Lauman Sveijer
- Date of birth: 28 April 2002 (age 24)
- Height: 1.87 m (6 ft 2 in)
- Position: Goalkeeper

Team information
- Current team: Sandviken
- Number: 1

Youth career
- –2019: IK Sirius

Senior career*
Years	Team	Apps	(Gls)
2019–2024	IK Sirius	10	(0)
2020	→ IFK Luleå (loan)	7	(0)
2020	→ Sollentuna FK (loan)	13	(0)
2021	→ Sandviken (loan)	10	(0)
2022	→ Sandviken (loan)	26	(0)
2024	→ AFC Eskilstuna (loan)	13	(0)
2024	→ Sandviken (loan)	1	(0)
2025–	Sandviken	34	(0)

International career
2021	Sweden U19	1	(0)
- * Club domestic league appearances and goals as of 12 November 2026

Hannes Åke Lauman Sveijer (born 28 April 2002) is a Swedish footballer who plays as a goalkeeper for Sandvikens IF.

== Club career ==
Benched 7 times for Sirius in 2019, he made his Allsvenskan debut in 2020. In 2020 and 2021 he also spent time on loan at Ettan clubs IFK Luleå, Sollentuna FK and Sandvikens IF.

On 21 February 2022, Sveijer returned to Sandviken on a new loan.

On 21 February 2024, Sveijer was loaned by AFC Eskilstuna.
