= William Nieroth =

Swedish footballer (born 2006)

Personal information
- Full name: William Henrik Nieroth Lundgren
- Date of birth: 13 March 2006 (age 20)
- Place of birth: Malmö, Sweden
- Height: 1.94 m (6 ft 4 in)
- Position: Goalkeeper

Team information
- Current team: Malmö FF
- Number: 39

Youth career
- 2011–2013: LB07
- 2014–2024: Malmö FF

Senior career*
Years	Team	Apps	(Gls)
2025–	Malmö FF	1	(0)
2025	→ BK Olympic (loan)	20	(0)

International career^{‡}
2021	Sweden U15	1	(0)
2022	Sweden U16	2	(0)
2023	Sweden U17	4	(0)
2024	Sweden U18	4	(0)
2024	Sweden U19	3	(0)
- * Club domestic league appearances and goals as of 17 May 2026 ‡ National team caps and goals as of 17 May 2026

William Henrik Nieroth Lundgren (born 13 March 2006) is a Swedish professional footballer who plays as a goalkeeper for Allsvenskan club Malmö FF.

== Club career ==
Nieroth began his career at LB07 before joining Malmö FF at a young age. Coming up through the youth ranks of Sweden's most successful club, in 2024 Nieroth was awarded as the P19 Allsvenskan Goalkeeper of the Year. In an under-19s game against Halmstads BK in the same year, he also managed to score a goal with a header. For the 2025 season, Nieroth was awarded a first team-contract and subsequently loaned out to partner club BK Olympic in the Ettan Södra, where he made 20 appearances. He returned to Malmö FF in 2026 as the club's third-choice goalkeeper. On 17 May 2026, Nieroth made his starting debut with Malmö FF in a 1–4 loss against Hammarby IF away from home at 3 Arena, following a Robin Olsen injury and Johan Dahlin being ill. Despite conceding 4 goals he was praised by his teammates, and TV expert John Guidetti said that "[Nieroth] is their best player. It says something when it ends 4–1 and Malmö's best player by far is the debutant standing between the posts.".

== International career ==
Nieroth is a youth international for Sweden, having represented all the youth teams between the U15s and the U19s.

== Career statistics ==
As of match played 27 August 2026

Appearances and goals by club, season and competition
Club	Season	League			Cup		Continental		Other		Total	
Club	Season	Division	Apps	Goals	Apps	Goals	Apps	Goals	Apps	Goals	Apps	Goals
Malmö FF	2024	Allsvenskan	0	0	0	0	—		—		0	0
Malmö FF	2025	Allsvenskan	0	0	0	0	—		—		0	0
Malmö FF	2026	Allsvenskan	1	0	1	0	—		—		2	0
Malmö FF	Total		1	0	1	0	—		—		2	0
BK Olympic (loan)	2025	Ettan Fotboll	20	0	1	0	—		—		21	0
Career total			21	0	2	0	0	0	0	0	23	0
