= Noah Söderberg =

Swedish footballer (born 2001)

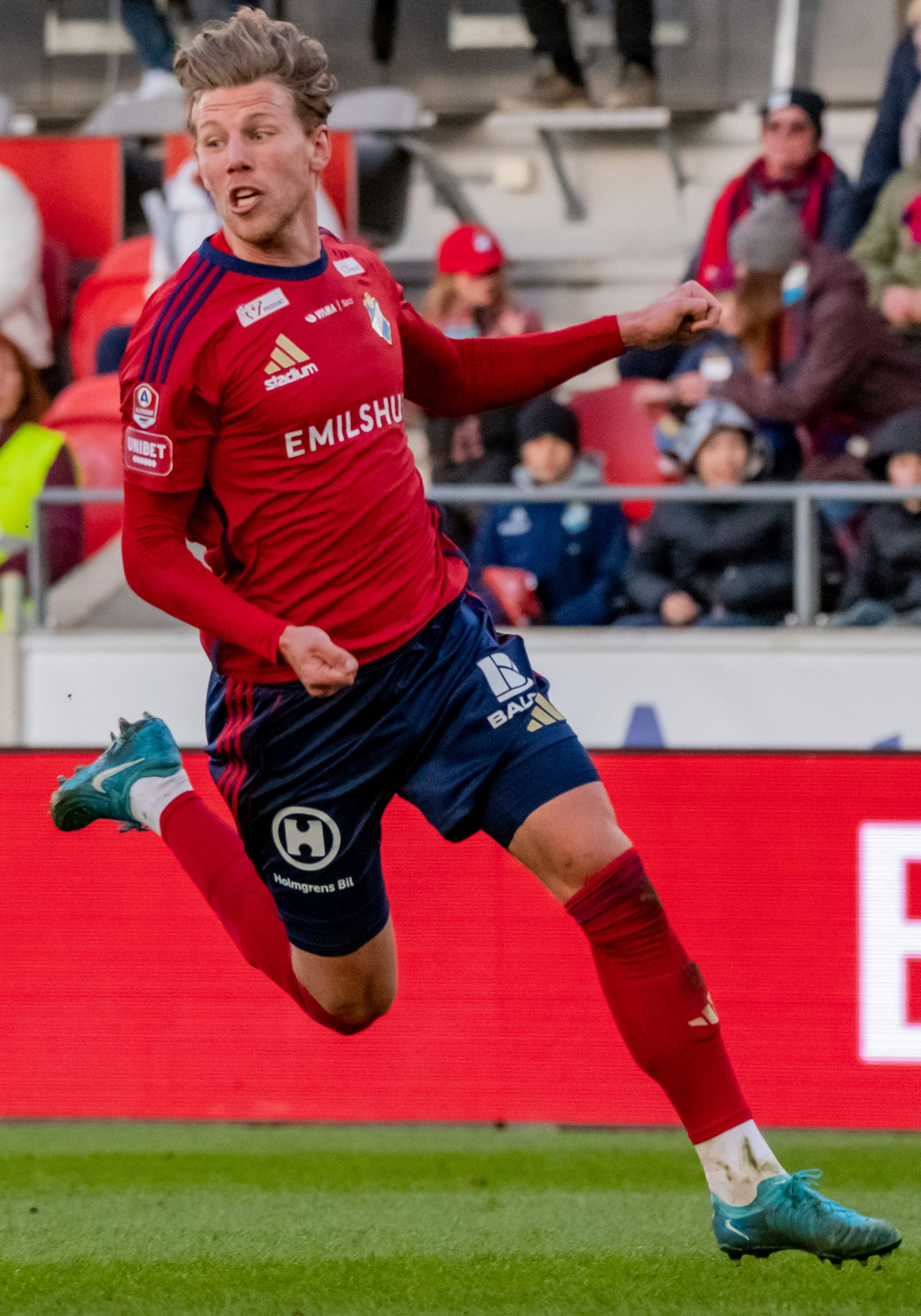

Personal information
- Full name: Noah Alexander Söderberg
- Date of birth: 21 August 2001 (age 25)
- Place of birth: Borås, Sweden
- Height: 1.82 m (6 ft 0 in)
- Position: Midfielder

Team information
- Current team: Östers IF
- Number: 6

Youth career
- –2020: IF Elfsborg

Senior career*
Years	Team	Apps	(Gls)
2021–2024	IF Elfsborg	61	(6)
2024	→ Halmstads BK (loan)	7	(0)
2025–	Östers IF	45	(2)
- * Club domestic league appearances and goals as of 12 November 2026

Noah Alexander Söderberg (born 21 August 2001) is a Swedish footballer who plays as a midfielder for Östers IF.

== Career ==
On 5 March 2025, Söderberg joined Östers IF on a three-year contract.
