= Annelunds IF =

Swedish football club

- Full name: Annelunds Idrottsförening
- Nickname: AIF
- Founded: 1924
- Ground: Mörlanda Sportcenter; Ljung; Sweden
- Capacity: 1,000
- Chairman: Sören Wessbo
- Head coach: Jonas Dahlin
- Coach: Jonny Hägerå
- League: Division 2 Västra Götaland
- 2009: Division 3 Mellersta Götaland, 5th
Home colours	Away colours

Annelunds IF is a Swedish football club located in Ljung in Herrljunga Municipality, Västra Götaland County.

== Background ==
Since their foundation in 1924 Annelunds IF has participated mainly in the lower divisions of the Swedish football league system. The club currently plays in Division 2 Västra Götaland which is the fourth tier of Swedish football. They play their home matches at the Mörlanda Sportcenter in Ljung.

The club is affiliated to the Västergötlands Fotbollförbund.

== Season to season ==
Season	Level	Division	Section	Position	Movements
1999	Tier 5	Division 4	Västergötland Västra	6th	
2000	Tier 5	Division 4	Västergötland Västra	8th	
2001	Tier 5	Division 4	Västergötland Västra	8th	
2002	Tier 5	Division 4	Västergötland Västra	6th	
2003	Tier 5	Division 4	Västergötland Västra	1st	Promoted
2004	Tier 4	Division 3	Mellersta Götaland	4th	
2005	Tier 4	Division 3	Mellersta Götaland	7th	
2006*	Tier 5	Division 3	Mellersta Götaland	9th	Relegation Playoffs
2007	Tier 5	Division 3	Mellersta Götaland	1st	Promoted
2008	Tier 4	Division 2	Västra Götaland	10th	Relegation Playoffs
2009	Tier 4	Division 2	Östra Götaland	5th	
2010	Tier 4	Division 2	Västra Götaland	10th	Relegation Playoffs – Relegated

* League restructuring in 2006 resulted in a new division being created at Tier 3 and subsequent divisions dropping a level.

== Attendances ==
In recent seasons Annelunds IF have had the following average attendances:

Season	Average attendance	Division / Section	Level
2005	204	Div 3 Mellersta Götaland	Tier 4
2006	154	Div 3 Mellersta Götaland	Tier 5
2007	198	Div 3 Mellersta Götaland	Tier 5
2008	238	Div 2 Västra Götaland	Tier 4
2009	288	Div 2 Östra Götaland	Tier 4
2010	262	Div 2 Västra Götaland	Tier 4

* Attendances are provided in the Publikliga sections of the Svenska Fotbollförbundet website.
