= Kevin Jensen (footballer) =

Swedish footballer

Personal information
- Full name: Kevin Alexander Jensen
- Date of birth: 15 June 2001 (age 25)
- Height: 1.73 m (5 ft 8 in)
- Position: Winger

Team information
- Current team: Landskrona BoIS
- Number: 21

Youth career
- Billeberga GIF
- –2017: Landskrona BoIS

Senior career*
Years	Team	Apps	(Gls)
2017–2021	Landskrona BoIS	86	(20)
2022–2024	Kalmar FF	43	(2)
2025–	Landskrona BoIS	49	(3)

International career
2018	Sweden U17	5	(0)
2021	Sweden U20	2	(0)
- * Club domestic league appearances and goals as of 11 November 2026

Kevin Jensen (born 15 June 2001) is a Swedish footballer who plays as a midfielder for Landskrona BoIS in Superettan.

== Career ==
Jensen grew up in Tågarp and started his youth career in Billeberga GIF. He went on to the youth section of Landskrona BoIS, and in 2017 he was benched 13 times for the senior team. He made his Superettan debut in April 2018 against Värnamo. His breakthrough came in 2019, when he scored 8 goals in 25 league games as a winger, and was named as Talent of the Year in Division 1.

Jensen also played two tournaments in 2018 for Sweden U17, then returned in 2021 to play back-to-back matches against Finland U20 for Sweden U20.

After winning promotion to the 2021 Superettan and playing every league game there except one, Jensen was recruited by Kalmar FF. Choosing Kalmar over Hammarby, Jensen stated that Henrik Rydström's Kalmar played as a "mini version of Manchester City" and that Hammarby seemed too turbulent, especially outside the pitch.

Ahead of the 2025 season, Jensen returned to his former club Landskrona BoIS, signing until the end of 2026.
