= Victor Backman (footballer) =

Swedish footballer

Personal information
- Date of birth: 16 March 2001 (age 25)
- Height: 1.68 m (5 ft 6 in)
- Position: Midfielder

Team information
- Current team: Sandviken
- Number: 11

Youth career
- –2017: Köping FF
- 2017–2020: Kalmar FF

Senior career*
| Years | Team | Apps | (Gls) |
| 2021–2022 | Kalmar FF | 23 | (0) |
| 2022 | → Oskarshamn (loan) | 1 | (0) |
| 2023–2024 | Örebro SK | 42 | (3) |
| 2025– | Sandviken | 48 | (4) |
- * Club domestic league appearances and goals as of 12 November 2026

Victor Backman (born 16 March 2001) is a Swedish footballer who plays as a midfielder for Sandvikens IF.
