= Oliver Zandén =

Swedish footballer (born 2001)

Personal information
- Full name: Carl Oliver Zandén
- Date of birth: 14 August 2001 (age 25)
- Place of birth: Alingsås, Sweden
- Height: 1.83 m (6 ft 0 in)
- Position: Left-back

Team information
- Current team: IF Brommapojkarna
- Number: 6

Youth career
- –2016: Gerdskens BK
- 2016–2021: IF Elfsborg

Senior career*
Years	Team	Apps	(Gls)
2021–2022	IF Elfsborg	18	(2)
2022–2024	Toulouse B	8	(1)
2022–2024	Toulouse	5	(0)
2024	→ Randers (loan)	13	(0)
2025–	IF Brommapojkarna	35	(0)

International career
2018–2021	Sweden U19	6	(0)
- * Club domestic league appearances and goals as of 8 July 2026

Carl Oliver Zandén (born 14 August 2001) is a Swedish professional footballer who plays as a left-back for Allsvenskan side IF Brommapojkarna.

== Club career ==
Born in Alingsås, Västergötland, Zandén started his career at hometown club Gerdskens BK, before joining the youth ranks of Elfsborg in 2016 at the age of 15. During the time in the club's youth system, he played in the UEFA Youth League.

On 19 July 2022, Zandén signed with Toulouse in France. In his first season in France, he only managed just over 230 minutes of playing time, while also making a few appearances for the club's reserve team. In June 2023, Zandén underwent surgery and was out for three months. In January 2024, Zandén moved to Danish Superliga club Randers FC on a one-year lease with an option to buy.

On 9 December 2024, Allsvenskan side IF Brommapojkarna confirmed that Zandén was joining the club from the new year.

== Career statistics ==
=== Club ===
As of match played 6 October 2024

Club	Season	League			National Cup (Note: Includes Svenska Cupen, Coupe de France, Danish Cup)		Continental		Other		Total	
Club	Season	Division	Apps	Goals	Apps	Goals	Apps	Goals	Apps	Goals	Apps	Goals
IF Elfsborg	2021	Allsvenskan	5	0	1	0	2 (Note: Appearance(s) in UEFA Europa Conference League)	0	—		8	0
IF Elfsborg	2022	Allsvenskan	13	1	3	0	0	0	—		16	1
IF Elfsborg	Total		18	1	4	0	2	0	0	0	24	1
Toulouse B	2022-23	Championnat National 3	5	1	—		—		—		5	1
Toulouse B	2023-24	Championnat National 2	3	0	—		—		—		3	0
Toulouse B	Total		8	1	—		—		—		8	1
Toulouse	2022-23	Ligue 1	5	0	1	0	—		—		6	0
Toulouse	2023-24	Ligue 1	0	0	0	0	0	0	0	0	0	0
Toulouse	Total		5	0	1	0	0	0	0	0	6	0
Randers (loan)	2023-24	Danish Superliga	8	0	0	0	—		1 (Note: Appearance(s) in Danish Superliga European play-offs)	0	9	0
Randers (loan)	2024-25	Danish Superliga	2	0	2	0	—		—		4	0
Randers (loan)	Total		10	0	2	0	0	0	1	0	13	0
Career total			41	2	7	0	2	0	1	0	51	2
