= 2022 AIK Fotboll season =

AIK
2022 season
- Owner: Robert Falck
- Manager: Bartosz Grzelak (until 19 August); Henok Goitom (Interim) (from 19 August)
- Stadium: Friends Arena
- Allsvenskan: 5th
- 2021–22 Svenska Cupen: Quarterfinal
- 2022–23 Svenska Cupen: Progressed to 2023 season
- UEFA Europa Conference League: Playoff Round vs Slovácko
- Top goalscorer: League: Nicolás Stefanelli (9); All: Two Players (11)
- Highest home attendance: 45,117 vs Hammarby (28 August 2022)
- Lowest home attendance: 3,927 vs Örebro (7 March 2022)
- Average home league attendance: 21,755 (6 November 2022)
Home colours	Away colours

The 2022 season was AIK 131st in existence, their 94th season in Allsvenskan and their 17th consecutive season in the league.

== Season events ==
On 3 September 2021, AIK announced the signing of Henry Atola from Tusker, with the player officially joining on 1 January 2022 on a contract until 1 September 2026.

On 21 December 2021, AIK announced the signings of Jesper Ceesay from Brommapojkarna and Josafat Mendes from Hammarby, with both players officially joining on 1 January 2022 on contracts until 31 December 2025.

On 9 March, AIK announced the signing of Axel Björnström on a contract until 31 December 2024, after the player had ended his contract with Arsenal Tula.

On 31 March, Benjamin Kimpioka joined AIK 2.5-year contract after leaving Sunderland for an undisclosed fee.

On 1 April, AIK announced the signing of Collins Sichenje from Leopards on a contract until 31 December 2026.

On 4 April, AIK announced the singing of Jordan Larsson on a short-term contract until 30 June, after the player invoked a special regulation introduced by FIFA that allowed him to suspend his Spartak Moscow contract in relation to the Russian invasion of Ukraine and join another team until the end of the season.

On 5 May, AIK announced that they had signed a pre-contract agreement with John Guidetti for the player to join the club on contact until 31 December 2025, from 1 July once his Alavés contract has expired.

On 18 July, Tom Strannegård extended his contract with AIK until 31 December 2024, and then joined Start for the remainder of the season.

On 5 August, AIK announced the year-long loan signing of Vincent Thill from Vorskla Poltava.

== Squad ==
As of match played 6 November 2022

No.	Name	Nationality	Position	Date of birth (age)	Signed from	Signed in	Contract ends	Apps.	Goals
Goalkeepers
13	Kyriakos Stamatopoulos	(Canada)	GK	28 August 1979 (aged 43)	Tromsø	2011		58	0
15	Kristoffer Nordfeldt	(Sweden)	GK	23 June 1989 (aged 33)	Gençlerbirliği	2021		52	0
23	Budimir Janošević	(Serbia)	GK	21 October 1989 (aged 33)	Brommapojkarna	2018	2022	56	0
Defenders
2	Josafat Mendes	(Sweden)	DF	31 December 2002 (aged 19)	Hammarby	2022	2025	34	1
3	Per Karlsson	(Sweden)	DF	2 January 1986 (aged 36)	Academy	2003		455	5
4	Sotirios Papagiannopoulos	(Sweden)	DF	5 September 1990 (aged 32)	Copenhagen	2020		83	3
5	Alexander Milošević	(Sweden)	DF	30 January 1992 (aged 30)	Vejle	2021	2021 (+2)	164	10
12	Axel Björnström	(Sweden)	DF	10 September 1995 (aged 27)	Unattached	2022	2025	33	1
25	Erick Otieno	(Kenya)	DF	27 September 1996 (aged 26)	Vasalund	2020		73	3
28	Rasmus Bonde	(Sweden)	DF	1 February 2003 (aged 19)	Academy	2021		2	0
29	Collins Sichenje	(Kenya)	DF	19 September 2003 (aged 19)	Leopards	2022	2026	12	0
33	Mikael Lustig	(Sweden)	DF	21 May 2003 (aged 19)	Gent	2020		61	2
Midfielders
7	Sebastian Larsson	(Sweden)	MF	6 June 1985 (aged 37)	Hull City	2018		140	30
8	Bilal Hussein	(Sweden)	MF	22 April 2000 (aged 22)	Academy	2018		120	4
10	Nabil Bahoui	(Sweden)	MF	5 February 1991 (aged 31)	De Graafschap	2019		180	64
17	Vincent Thill	(Luxembourg)	MF	4 February 2000 (aged 22)	on loan from Vorskla Poltava	2022	2023	11	1
20	Zack Elbouzedi	(Republic of Ireland)	MF	5 April 1998 (aged 24)	Lincoln City	2021	2024	54	3
24	Jesper Ceesay	(Sweden)	MF	4 May 2003 (aged 19)	Brommapojkarna	2022	2025	12	0
26	Yasin Ayari	(Sweden)	MF	6 October 2003 (aged 19)	Academy	2020		48	7
35	Taha Ayari	(Sweden)	MF	10 October 2005 (aged 17)	Academy	2022		6	0
Forwards
9	Nicolás Stefanelli	(Argentina)	FW	22 November 1994 (aged 27)	Unión La Calera	2021	2023	113	40
11	John Guidetti	(Sweden)	FW	15 April 1992 (aged 30)	Alavés	2022	2025	19	5
19	Calvin Kabuye	(Sweden)	FW	28 March 2003 (aged 19)	Academy	2021		0	0
22	Benjamin Kimpioka	(Sweden)	FW	21 February 2000 (aged 22)	Sunderland	2022	2024	23	1
30	Henry Atola	(Kenya)	FW	21 December 2001 (aged 20)	Tusker	2022	2026	6	1
34	Erik Ring	(Sweden)	FW	24 April 2002 (aged 20)	Academy	2020		57	4
42	Victor Andersson	(Sweden)	FW	22 October 2004 (aged 18)	Academy	2022		1	0
Out on loan
6	Jetmir Haliti	(Kosovo)	DF	14 September 1996 (aged 26)	Jönköpings Södra	2021	2023	4	0
14	Lucas Forsberg	(Sweden)	DF	21 May 2003 (aged 19)	Sollentuna	2021	2023	1	0
16	Robin Tihi	(Finland)	DF	16 March 2002 (aged 20)	Academy	2020		19	1
31	Jakob Haugaard	(Denmark)	GK	1 May 1992 (aged 30)	Stoke City	2020		16	0
32	Tom Strannegård	(Sweden)	MF	29 April 2002 (aged 20)	Academy	2019		35	2
35	Samuel Brolin	(Sweden)	GK	29 September 2000 (aged 22)	Academy	2019		0	0
37	Ahmad Faqa	(Sweden)	DF	10 January 2003 (aged 19)	Academy	2021		1	0
Left during the season
12	Felix Melki	(Lebanon)	DF	23 July 1994 (aged 28)	AFC Eskilstuna	2019		22	0
17	Ebenezer Ofori	(Ghana)	MF	1 July 1995 (aged 27)	VfB Stuttgart	2020		139	6
18	Amar Ahmed	(Sweden)	MF	19 February 2004 (aged 18)	Academy	2020		19	1
19	Jordan Larsson	(Sweden)	FW	20 June 1997 (aged 25)	on loan from Spartak Moscow	2022	2022	11	3
21	Bojan Radulović	(Serbia)	FW	9 December 1999 (aged 22)	Brighton & Hove Albion	2020		31	4

=== Out on loan ===
Note: Flags indicate national team as defined under FIFA eligibility rules; some limited exceptions apply. Players may hold more than one non-FIFA nationality.

No.	Pos.	Nation	Player
6	DF	KOS	Jetmir Haliti (to Mjällby AIF until 31 December 2022)
14	DF	SWE	Lucas Forsberg (to Sollentuna FK until 31 December 2022)
16	DF	FIN	Robin Tihi (to IFK Värnamo until 31 December 2022)
31	GK	DEN	Jakob Haugaard (to Tromsø IL until 31 December 2022)

No.	Pos.	Nation	Player
32	MF	SWE	Tom Strannegård (to IK Start until 31 December 2022)
35	GK	SWE	Samuel Brolin (to Mjällby AIF until 31 December 2022)
37	DF	SWE	Ahmad Faqa (to Sandvikens IF until 30 November 2022)

== Transfers ==
=== In ===
Date	Position	Nationality	Name	From	Fee	Ref.
1 January 2022	DF	(Sweden)	Josafat Mendes	Hammarby	Undisclosed	
1 January 2022	MF	(Sweden)	Jesper Ceesay	Brommapojkarna	Undisclosed	
1 January 2022	FW	(Kenya)	Henry Atola	Tusker	Undisclosed	
9 March 2022	DF	(Sweden)	Axel Björnström	Unattached	Free	
31 March 2022	FW	(Sweden)	Benjamin Kimpioka	Sunderland	Undisclosed	
1 April 2022	DF	(Kenya)	Collins Sichenje	Leopards	Undisclosed	
1 July 2022	FW	(Sweden)	John Guidetti	Alavés	Free	

=== Loans in ===
Start date	Position	Nationality	Name	From	End date	Ref.
4 April 2022	FW	(Sweden)	Jordan Larsson	Spartak Moscow	30 June 2022	
5 August 2022	MF	(Luxembourg)	Vincent Thill	Vorskla Poltava	30 June 2023	

=== Out ===
Date	Position	Nationality	Name	To	Fee	Ref.
10 January 2022	MF	(Finland)	Saku Ylätupa	GIF Sundsvall	Undisclosed	
15 June 2022	MF	(Ghana)	Ebenezer Ofori	Vejle	Undisclosed	
30 August 2022	MF	(Sweden)	Amar Ahmed	Troyes	Undisclosed	
31 July 2022	FW	(Serbia)	Bojan Radulović	HJK	Undisclosed	

=== Loans out ===
Start date	Position	Nationality	Name	To	End date	Ref.
13 January 2022	MF	(Ghana)	Ebenezer Ofori	Vejle	30 June 2022	
10 January 2022	DF	(Lebanon)	Felix Melki	AFC Eskilstuna	30 June 2022	
10 January 2022	DF	(Sweden)	Lucas Forsberg	Sollentuna	31 December 2022	
25 January 2022	GK	(Denmark)	Jakob Haugaard	Tromsø	31 December 2022	
26 January 2022	DF	(Finland)	Robin Tihi	Värnamo	31 December 2022	
15 February 2022	FW	(Serbia)	Bojan Radulović	HJK	30 June 2022	
18 March 2022	DF	(Sweden)	Rasmus Bonde	Vasalund	15 July 2022	
24 March 2022	DF	(Sweden)	Ahmad Faqa	Västerås	28 July 2022	
31 March 2022	DF	(Kosovo)	Jetmir Haliti	Mjällby	31 December 2022	
18 July 2022	MF	(Sweden)	Tom Strannegård	IK Start	31 December 2022	
28 July 2022	DF	(Sweden)	Ahmad Faqa	Sandviken	31 December 2022	

=== Released ===
Date	Position	Nationality	Name	Joined	Date	Ref
30 June 2022	DF	(Lebanon)	Felix Melki	AFC Eskilstuna	1 July 2022	

== Friendlies ==
	v
CEST (UTC+2)

== Competitions ==
=== Overview ===
Competition	First match	Last match	Starting round	Final position	Record							
Competition	First match	Last match	Starting round	Final position	Pld	W	D	L	GF	GA	GD	Win %
Allsvenskan	2 April 2022	6 November 2022	Matchday 1	5th	30	14	8	8	45	36	+9	46.67
2021–22 Svenska Cupen	19 February 2022	14 March 2022	Group stage	Quarterfinal	4	2	1	1	9	4	+5	50.00
2022–23 Svenska Cupen	31 August 2022	See 2023 season	Second round	See 2023 season	1	1	0	0	4	2	+2	100.00
UEFA Europa Conference League	21 July 2022	25 August 2022	Second qualifying round	Playoff round	6	1	2	3	6	9	−3	16.67
Total					41	18	11	12	64	51	+13	43.90

Last updated: 6 November 2022
Source: Competitions

=== Allsvenskan ===
==== League table ====
Pos	Team	Pld	W	D	L	GF	GA	GD	Pts	Qualification or relegation
3	Hammarby IF	30	16	8	6	60	27	+33	56	Qualification for the Europa Conference League second qualifying round (Note: The 2022–23 Svenska Cupen winners qualified for the Europa Conference League second qualifying round. Since the cup winners (BK Häcken) qualified based on league position, the cup winner spot was passed to the second-placed team, and the last Conference League second qualifying round spot was passed to the fourth-placed team.)
4	Kalmar FF	30	15	6	9	41	27	+14	51	Qualification for the Europa Conference League second qualifying round
5	AIK	30	14	8	8	45	36	+9	50	
6	IF Elfsborg	30	13	10	7	55	35	+20	49	
7	Malmö FF	30	13	7	10	44	34	+10	46	

Source: svenskfotboll.se (in Swedish)
Rules for classification: 1) Points; 2) Goal difference; 3) Goals scored; 4) Head-to-head points; 5) Head-to-head goal difference; 6) Head-to-head away goals scored; 7) Play-off
(Note: Play-off is only played if need to decide champion, teams for relegation or UEFA competition and will be played on a neutral ground).

==== Results summary ====
Overall								Home						Away					
Pld	W	D	L	GF	GA	GD	Pts	W	D	L	GF	GA	GD	W	D	L	GF	GA	GD
30	14	8	8	45	36	+9	50	8	4	3	21	11	+10	6	4	5	24	25	−1

Last updated: 6 November 2022.
Source: Results

==== Results by matchday ====
Matchday	1	2	3	4	5	6	7	8	9	10	11	12	13	14	15	16	17	18	19	20	21	22	23	24	25	26	27	28	29	30
Ground	A	H	A	H	H	A	H	H (Note: matchday 16)	A (Note: matchday 8)	H (Note: matchday 9)	A (Note: matchday 10)	A (Note: matchday 11)	H (Note: matchday 12)	A (Note: matchday 13)	H (Note: matchday 14)	A (Note: matchday 15)	A	H	A	H	H	A	H	A	H	A	H	A	A	H
Result	L	W	L	W	W	W	W	W	D	D	W	D	L	D	W	W	L	D	W	D	W	L	D	D	W	W	L	L	W	L
Position	14	9	11	10	5	4	3	3	3	3	4	5	5	5	5	3	4	5	4	4	4	4	5	6	5	5	5	5	4	5

Updated to match(es) played on 6 November 2022. Source: Results
A = Away; H = Home; W = Win; D = Draw; L = Loss; P = Postponed

==== Results ====
2 April 2022 1	BK Häcken	4–2	AIK	Gothenburg
17:30 CEST (UTC+2)	Jeremejeff 12', 14', 62' (yellow card) 38'; Uddenäs (yellow card) 55'	Report	Bahoui 20'; Milošević (yellow card) 38'; Y.Ayari 77' (yellow card) 90+2'	Stadium: Bravida Arena; Attendance: 6,117; Referee: Andreas Ekberg

10 April 2022 2	AIK	1–0	IFK Norrköping	Stockholm
17:30 CEST (UTC+2)	Milošević 15' (yellow card) 48'; Y.Ayari (yellow card) 32'; Lustig (yellow card) 40'; S.Larsson (yellow card) 65'; Nordfeldt (yellow card) 90+5'	Report	Markovic (yellow card) 9'	Stadium: Friends Arena; Attendance: 27,561; Referee: Kristoffer Karlsson

17 April 2022 3	Malmö	3–0	AIK	Malmö
15:00 CEST (UTC+2)	Thelin 3', 79'; Toivonen 45+7'; Berget (yellow card) 77'	Report	Ceesay (yellow card) 26'; Björnström (yellow card) 51'; Otieno (yellow card) 77'	Stadium: Eleda Stadion; Attendance: 20,122; Referee: Mohammed Al-Hakim

20 April 2022 4	AIK	1–0	Varbergs BoIS	Stockholm
19:00 CEST (UTC+2)	S.Larsson 27'	Report	Stanisic (yellow card) 28'; Birkfeldt (yellow card) 45+1'	Stadium: Friends Arena; Attendance: 15,112; Referee: Adam Ladebäck

24 April 2024 5	AIK	1–0	Djurgården	Stockholm
15:00 CEST (UTC+2)	Hussein (yellow card) 35'; Stefanelli 45'; Milošević (yellow card) 90+2'; Nordfeldt (yellow card) 90+3'	Report	Johansson (yellow card) 37'; Hien (yellow card) 78'	Stadium: Friends Arena; Attendance: 41,407; Referee: Glenn Nyberg

1 May 2022 6	GIF Sundsvall	0–2	AIK	Sundsvall
17:30 CEST (UTC+2)	Corona (yellow card) 66'; Eriksson (yellow card) 68'; Carström (yellow card) 77'	Report	J.Larsson 45+1'; Papagiannopoulos (yellow card) 49'; Bahoui 70'	Stadium: Idrottsparken; Attendance: 5,150; Referee: Andreas Ekberg

7 May 2022 7	AIK	1–0	IFK Göteborg	Stockholm
15:00 CEST (UTC+2)	Otieno (yellow card) 35'; S.Larsson (yellow card) 56'; Milošević 69'	Report	Aiesh (yellow card) 24'; Berg (yellow card) 32'	Stadium: Friends Arena; Attendance: 27,175; Referee: Victor Wolff

11 May 2022 16	AIK	2–0	Malmö	Stockholm
19:00 CEST (UTC+2)	Bahoui (yellow card) 13'; Hadžikadunić 17' (o.g.); Papagiannopoulos (yellow card) 86'; S.Larsson 87'; Hussein (yellow card) 90+3'	Report	Hadžikadunić (yellow card) 65'; Olsson (yellow card) 86'	Stadium: Friends Arena; Attendance: 25,153; Referee: Adam Ladebäck

15 May 2022 8	Hammarby	3–3	AIK	Stockholm
15:00 CEST (UTC+2)	Ludwigson 32'; Jeahze 40'; Bojanić (penalty missed) 60'; Fenger (yellow card) 63'; Kurtulus (yellow card) 69'; Besara 72'	Report	Bahoui 9', 84'; S.Larsson 64'; Papagiannopoulos (yellow card) 71'; Janošević (yellow card) 73'; Björnström (yellow card) 89'	Stadium: Tele2 Arena; Attendance: 28,756; Referee: Kristoffer Karlsson

21 May 2022 9	AIK	2–2	IK Sirius	Stockholm
15:00 CEST (UTC+2)	J.Larsson 43'; Otieno 45+2'	Report	Kouakou 22'; Lagemyr 39'	Stadium: Friends Arena; Attendance: 25,619; Referee: Mohammed Al-Hakim

29 May 2022 10	Helsingborg	1–2	AIK	Helsingborg
17:30 CEST (UTC+2)	Hellman (yellow card) 34' van den Hurk 42' (yellow card) 80'; Suljić (yellow card) 50'; Jönsson (yellow card) 58'	Report	Otieno (yellow card) 44'; S.Larsson 51' (yellow card) 83'; J.Larsson 62'	Stadium: Olympia; Attendance: 8,713; Referee: Kaspar Sjöberg

26 June 2022 11	Degerfors	1–1	AIK	Degerfors
15:00 CEST (UTC+2)	Đurđić 13'; A.Kralj (yellow card) 90+6'	Report	Ahmed 44'; Björnström (yellow card) 74'; Milošević (yellow card) 90+6'	Stadium: Stora Valla; Attendance: 5,880; Referee: Kristoffer Karlsson

2 July 2022 12	AIK	0–1	Mjällby	Stockholm
15:00 CEST (UTC+2)	S.Larsson (yellow card) 23'; Otieno (yellow card) 64'; Atola (yellow card) 90+2'	Report	Nwankwo 40'; Gustafson (yellow card) 61'; Gustavsson (yellow card) 90+5'	Stadium: Friends Arena; Attendance: 21,202; Referee: Fredrik Klitte

10 July 2022 13	Elfsborg	2–2	AIK	Borås
15:00 CEST (UTC+2)	Henriksson 25'; Rømer (yellow card) 42'; Stefanelli 71' (o.g.)	Report	Stefanelli 17'; Kimpioka 49'; Elbouzedi (yellow card) 85'	Stadium: Borås Arena; Attendance: 9,859; Referee: Glenn Nyberg

17 July 2021 14	AIK	1–0	Kalmar	Stockholm
15:00 CEST (UTC+2)	Lustig 40'; Milošević (yellow card) 43'; Hussein (yellow card) 84'	Report	Sætra (yellow card) 77'	Stadium: Friends Arena; Attendance: 24,769; Referee: Adam Ladebäck

24 July 2022 15	Värnamo	2–3	AIK	Värnamo
15:00 CEST (UTC+2)	Wenderson (yellow card) 38' (goal) 53'; Antonsson 53'	Report	Guidetti 23' (yellow card) 88'; Tihi 55' (o.g.); Stefanelli 69'	Stadium: Finnvedsvallen; Attendance: 5,070; Referee: Joakim Östling

7 August 2022 17	Kalmar	1–0	AIK	Hällevik
15:00 CEST (UTC+2)	Berg 54'; Sachpekidis (yellow card) 90+1'	Report	S.Larsson (yellow card) 43'; Sichenje (yellow card) 78'	Stadium: Strandvallen; Attendance: 10,024; Referee: Andreas Ekberg

14 August 2022 18	AIK	2–2	Värnamo	Stockholm
15:00 CEST (UTC+2)	Y.Ayari 44'; Lustig 78'; Thill (yellow card) 79'	Report	Antonsson 28', 62'; Kenndal (yellow card) 81'	Stadium: Friends Arena; Attendance: 19,576; Referee: Kaspar Sjöberg

21 August 2022 19	IFK Norrköping	2–4	AIK	Norrköping
17:30 CEST (UTC+2)	Wahlqvist (yellow card) 25'; Sigurðsson (yellow card) 41' (goal) 90'; Nyman (yellow card) 66'; Sema 90+6'	Report	Bahoui (yellow card) 4' (goal) 38'; Y.Ayari 13'; Papagiannopoulos (yellow card) 19'; Stefanelli 36'; Thill (red card) 41'; Mendes (yellow card) 84'; Ring (yellow card) 90+7'; Otieno 90+8'	Stadium: Nya Parken; Attendance: 12,756; Referee: Kristoffer Karlsson

28 August 2022 20	AIK	2–2	Hammarby	Stockholm
15:00 CEST (UTC+2)	Guidetti 2'; Stefanelli 46'; Ceesay (yellow card) 54'	Report	Besara 37'; Berisha 59'; Jeahze (yellow card) 80'; Fenger (yellow card) 83'; Pinas (yellow card) 90'	Stadium: Friends Arena; Attendance: 45,117; Referee: Andreas Ekberg

4 September 2022 21	AIK	4–0	GIF Sundsvall	Stockholm
17:30 CEST (UTC+2)	S.Larsson (yellow card) 18' (goal) 90+4'; Stefanelli 45', 82'; Bahoui 57'	Report	Burman (yellow card) 79'; Lasso (yellow card) 90+3'	Stadium: Friends Arena; Attendance: 19,170; Referee: Granite Macedonci

11 September 2022 22	Varbergs BoIS	2–0	AIK	Varberg
17:30 CET (UTC+1)	Tranberg (yellow card) 8' (goal) 78'; A.Johansson (yellow card) 19'; Liljenbäck (yellow card) 25'; Le Roux (yellow card) 26'; F.Sissé 80'; F.Bohman (yellow card) 88'	Report	Y.Ayari (yellow card) 19'	Stadium: Påskbergsvallen; Attendance: 2,786; Referee: Joakim Östling

18 September 2022 23	AIK	1–1	Degerfors	Stockholm
17:30 CEST (UTC+2)	Thill 12'; Stefanelli (yellow card) 45+3'; S.Larsson (yellow card) 56'; Papagiannopoulos (yellow card) 71'	Report	Carlén (yellow card) 45+5'; Örqvist 53'; Đurđić (yellow card) 90+5'	Stadium: Friends Arena; Attendance: 18,217; Referee: Fredrik Klitte

2 October 2022 24	IK Sirius	1–1	AIK	Uppsala
17:30 CEST (UTC+2)	Björkström 62'; Widgren (yellow card) 65'; Kouakou (yellow card) 88'	Report	S.Larsson (yellow card) 49'; Stefanelli (yellow card) 52'; Y.Ayari (yellow card) 67'; Papagiannopoulos 76'	Stadium: Studenternas IP; Attendance: 9,331; Referee: Adam Ladebäck

9 October 2022 25	AIK	2–0	Helsingborg	Stockholm
17:30 CEST (UTC+2)	Mendes (yellow card) 31'; Guidetti (yellow card) 36' (goal) 49'; Elbouzedi 90+6'	Report	Widell (yellow card) 59'; Rejnhold (yellow card) 70'; Rogne (yellow card) 81'	Stadium: Friends Arena; Attendance: 18,097; Referee: Kaspar Sjöberg

16 October 2022 26	Djurgården	1–2	AIK	Stockholm
15:00 CEST (UTC+2)	Löfgren (yellow card) 5'; Holmberg 90+3'	Report	Guidetti 10'; S.Larsson (yellow card) 14'; Otieno (yellow card) 27'; Hussein (yellow card) 45+2'; Stefanelli 61'; Sichenje (red card) 90+4'	Stadium: Tele2 Arena; Attendance: 26,702; Referee: Andreas Ekberg

19 October 2021 27	AIK	1–2	BK Häcken	Stockholm
19:00 CEST (UTC+2)	Y.Ayari (yellow card) 35' (yellow-red card) 69'; Papagiannopoulos (yellow card) 89'; Guidetti 90+1'; Ceesay (yellow card) 90+3'	Report	Sadiq 2'; Jeremejeff 85'	Stadium: Friends Arena; Attendance: 19,623; Referee: Glenn Nyberg

24 October 2022 28	IFK Göteborg	1–0	AIK	Gothenburg
19:10 CEST (UTC+2)	Svensson (yellow card) 16'; Wendt (yellow card) 65'; Markovic 81'	Report	Björnström (yellow card) 52'	Stadium: Gamla Ullevi; Attendance: 15,595; Referee: Victor Wolf

30 October 2022 29	Mjällby	1–2	AIK	Hällevik
15:00 CET (UTC+1)	Rosengren (yellow card) 45+1'; Moros (yellow card) 80'; Bergström 80'; Eile (yellow card) 86'; Haliti (yellow card) 89'; Gustafson (yellow card) 90+4'	Report	Sichenje (yellow card) 23'; Y.Ayari 38'; Papagiannopoulos (yellow card) 82'; Stefanelli 90'; Lustig (yellow card) 90+5'	Stadium: Strandvallen; Attendance: 3,455; Referee: Bojan Pandzic

6 November 2022 30	AIK	0–1	Elfsborg	Stockholm
15:00 CET (UTC+1)	Guidetti (yellow card) 44' (yellow-red card) 64'; S.Larsson (yellow card) 52'; Lustig (yellow card) 67'; Papagiannopoulos (yellow card) 90+1'; Elbouzedi (yellow card) 90+8'	Report	Ondrejka 79' (yellow card) 79'; Aga (yellow card) 81'	Stadium: Friends Arena; Attendance: 31,335; Referee: Fredrik Klitte

=== 2021–22 Svenska Cupen ===
==== Group stage ====
Pos	Team	Pld	W	D	L	GF	GA	GD	Pts	Qualification
1	AIK	3	2	1	0	7	1	+6	7	Advance to Knockout Stage
2	Eskilsminne IF	3	1	1	1	1	4	−3	4	
3	Örgryte IS	3	1	0	2	3	4	−1	3	
4	Örebro SK	3	0	2	1	2	4	−2	2	

Updated to match(es) played on unknown. Source: Swedish Football Association
Rules for classification: 1) Points; 2) Goal difference; 3) Goals scored; 4) Head-to-head record; 5) Lowest disciplinary points; 6) Highest ranked team

19 February 2022 1	AIK	2–0	Örgryte	Stockholm
15:15 CET (UTC+1)	Bahoui (yellow card) 24' (goal) 41', 60'; Otieno (yellow card) 90+2'	Report	E.Gustafson (yellow card) 30'; Ackermann (yellow card) 71'	Stadium: Skytteholms IP; Attendance: 4,249; Referee: Victor Wolf

27 February 2022 2	Eskilsminne	0–4	AIK	Helsingborg
15:15 CET (UTC+1)		Report	Bahoui 3', 5'; Elbouzedi 25'; Atola 87'	Stadium: Olympiafältet; Referee: Kristoffer Karlsson

7 March 2022 3	AIK	1–1	Örebro	Stockholm
19:00 CET (UTC+1)	S.Larsson 8' (yellow card) 78'; Stefanelli (yellow card) 21'; Mendes (yellow card) 42'; Lustig (yellow card) 76' (yellow-red card) 79'; Hussein (yellow card) 90'	Report	Ali (yellow card) 38'; J.Larsson 87'	Stadium: Skytteholms IP; Attendance: 3,927; Referee: Glenn Nyberg

==== Knockout stage ====
14 March 2022 Quarterfinal	Malmö	3–2 (a.e.t.)	AIK	Malmö
19:00 CET (UTC+1)	Nanasi 57'; Moisander 72'; Birmančević 105' (pen.) (yellow card) 105'		Elbouzedi (yellow card) 43'; Bahoui 51', 75' (yellow card) 104'; Ahmed (yellow card) 98'	Stadium: Malmö IP; Attendance: 3,290; Referee: Adam Ladebäck

=== 2022–23 Svenska Cupen ===
31 August 2022 Second round	Hudiksvall	2–4	AIK	Hudiksvall
18:00 CEST (UTC+2)	A.Zerai 39'; P.Caselius 82'	Report	Bahoui 9'; Stefanelli 59'; Ring 68'; S.Larsson 73'	Stadium: Glysisvallen; Attendance: 1,371; Referee: Robert Ahlman

Progressed to the 2023 season

=== UEFA Europa Conference League ===
==== Qualifying rounds ====
21 July 2022 Second qualifying round 1st leg	Vorskla Poltava (Ukraine)	3–2	(Sweden) AIK	Stockholm, Sweden
19:00 CEST (UTC+2)	Stepanyuk 4' (yellow card) 90'; Kozyrenko 24' (yellow card) 57'; Perduta (yellow card) 43'; Chelyadin 69'; Puclin (yellow card) 79'	Report	Stefanelli 17'; Papagiannopoulos (yellow card) 39'; S.Larsson 44' (yellow card) 54'; Ring (yellow card) 90'; Milošević (yellow card) 90+2'	Stadium: Tele2 Arena; Attendance: 7,911; Referee: Urs Schnyder (Switzerland)
Note: Due to the Russian invasion of Ukraine, Ukrainian teams were required to play their home matches at neutral venues until further notice.

27 July 2022 Second qualifying round 2nd leg	AIK (Sweden)	2–0 (a.e.t.) (4–3 agg.)	(Ukraine) Vorskla Poltava	Stockholm, Sweden
19:00 CEST (UTC+2)	Otieno (yellow card) 41'; Mendes 45+3'; Björnström 107'; Bahoui (yellow card) 117'; Hussein (yellow card) 120+1'	Report	Thill (yellow card) 45'; Rodrigues (yellow card) 83'; Batsula (yellow card) 88'; Riznyk (yellow card) 108'; Yavorskyi (yellow card) 112'; Puclin (yellow card) 119'	Stadium: Friends Arena; Attendance: 15,759; Referee: Miloš Milanović (Serbia)

4 August 2022 Third qualifying round 1st leg	AIK (Sweden)	1–1	(North Macedonia) Shkëndija	Stockholm, Sweden
19:00 CEST (UTC+2)	Guidetti 17' (yellow card) 83'; Otieno (yellow card) 33'; Sichenje (yellow card) 82'; Ahmed (yellow card) 90+1'	Report	Hasani 1'; Dita (yellow card) 26'; Bejtulai (yellow card) 48'; Neziri (yellow card) 79'; Stojanovski (yellow card) 83'	Stadium: Friends Arena; Attendance: 15,692; Referee: Bram Van Driessche (Belgium)

11 August 2022 Third qualifying round 2nd leg	Shkëndija (North Macedonia)	1–1 (a.e.t.) (2–2 agg.) (2–3 p)	(Sweden) AIK	Skopje, North Macedonia
20:00 CEST (UTC+2)	R.Ramadani (yellow card) 9'; Hasani 22' (pen.); A.Shala (yellow card) 60'; Dita (yellow card) 85'; Gonçalves (yellow card) 100'; Stojanovski (yellow card) 120+1'	Report	Ayari 56'; Otieno (yellow card) 73'; S.Larsson (yellow card) 75'; Stefanelli (yellow card) 85'; Björnström (yellow card) 95'; Sichenje (yellow card) 112'	Stadium: Toše Proeski Arena; Attendance: 4,304; Referee: Don Robertson (Scotland)
	Penalties
	Stojanovski (penalty scored); Dita (penalty missed); Doriev (penalty missed); Cake (penalty scored); Hasani (penalty missed)		(penalty missed) S.Larsson; (penalty scored) Hussein; (penalty scored) Stefanelli; (penalty scored) Björnström; (penalty missed) Ring
Note: Shkëndija played their home matches at the Toše Proeski Arena in Skopje, instead of their regular stadium, the Ecolog Arena, in Tetovo, which did not meet UEFA requirements.

18 August 2022 Playoff Round 1st leg	Slovácko (Czech Republic)	3–0	(Sweden) AIK	Uherské Hradiště, Czech Republic
19:00 CEST (UTC+2)	Petržela 28'; Trávník (yellow card) 72'; Sinyavskiy 77'; Reinberk 81'	Report		Stadium: Městský fotbalový stadion Miroslava Valenty; Attendance: 6,032; Referee: Horațiu Feșnic (Romania)

25 August 2022 Playoff Round 2nd leg	AIK (Sweden)	0–1 (0–4 agg.)	(Czech Republic) Slovácko	Stockholm, Sweden
19:00 CEST (UTC+2)	Papagiannopoulos (yellow card) 71'	Report	Trávník (yellow card) 19'; Kalabiška (yellow card) 74'; Sinyavskiy 76'	Stadium: Friends Arena; Attendance: 15,799; Referee: Donatas Rumšas (Lithuania)

== Squad statistics ==
As of match played 6 November 2022

=== Appearances and goals ===
No.	Pos	Nat	Player	Total		Allsvenskan		2021–22 Svenska Cupen		2022–23 Svenska Cupen		UEFA Europa Conference League	
No.	Pos	Nat	Player	Apps	Goals	Apps	Goals	Apps	Goals	Apps	Goals	Apps	Goals
2	DF	(Sweden) SWE	Josafat Mendes	34	1	18+6	0	3	0	1	0	4+2	1
3	DF	(Sweden) SWE	Per Karlsson	9	0	1+6	0	1+1	0	0	0	0	0
4	DF	(Sweden) SWE	Sotirios Papagiannopoulos	38	1	26+2	1	2+1	0	1	0	6	0
5	DF	(Sweden) SWE	Alexander Milošević	17	2	16	2	0	0	0	0	1	0
7	MF	(Sweden) SWE	Sebastian Larsson	37	8	26+1	5	3	1	0+1	1	6	1
8	MF	(Sweden) SWE	Bilal Hussein	34	0	23+1	0	3	0	1	0	6	0
9	FW	(Argentina) ARG	Nicolás Stefanelli	39	11	29	9	3	0	0+1	1	5+1	1
10	MF	(Sweden) SWE	Nabil Bahoui	30	11	18+5	6	3	4	1	1	1+2	0
11	FW	(Sweden) SWE	John Guidetti	19	5	11+3	5	0	0	0	0	4+1	0
12	DF	(Sweden) SWE	Axel Björnström	33	1	11+15	0	0	0	1	0	5+1	1
15	GK	(Sweden) SWE	Kristoffer Nordfeldt	37	0	28	0	3	0	0	0	6	0
17	MF	(Luxembourg) LUX	Vincent Thill	11	1	10+1	1	0	0	0	0	0	0
20	MF	(Republic of Ireland) IRL	Zack Elbouzedi	33	1	12+13	1	3	0	1	0	2+2	0
22	FW	(Sweden) SWE	Benjamin Kimpioka	23	1	5+11	1	0	0	1	0	2+4	0
23	GK	(Serbia) SRB	Budimir Janošević	3	0	2	0	0	0	1	0	0	0
24	MF	(Sweden) SWE	Jesper Ceesay	12	0	2+6	0	0+2	0	1	0	0+1	0
25	DF	(Kenya) KEN	Erick Otieno	34	2	25+1	2	3	0	0	0	4+1	0
26	MF	(Sweden) SWE	Yasin Ayari	33	5	15+9	4	2+1	0	0	0	6	1
28	DF	(Sweden) SWE	Rasmus Bonde	1	0	0	0	0	0	1	0	0	0
29	DF	(Kenya) KEN	Collins Sichenje	12	0	4+4	0	0	0	0	0	4	0
30	FW	(Kenya) KEN	Henry Atola	6	1	0+3	0	0+1	1	0+1	0	0+1	0
33	DF	(Sweden) SWE	Mikael Lustig	35	2	23+4	2	3	0	0+1	0	3+1	0
34	FW	(Sweden) SWE	Erik Ring	27	1	8+9	0	0+3	0	1	1	2+4	0
35	MF	(Sweden) SWE	Taha Ayari	6	0	1+4	0	0	0	0+1	0	0	0
37	DF	(Sweden) SWE	Ahmad Faqa	1	0	0	0	0+1	0	0	0	0	0
42	FW	(Sweden) SWE	Victor Andersson	1	0	0+1	0	0	0	0	0	0	0
Players away on loan:
32	MF	(Sweden) SWE	Tom Strannegård	3	0	0+3	0	0	0	0	0	0	0
Players who appeared for AIK but left during the season:
18	MF	(Sweden) SWE	Amar Ahmed	18	1	5+4	1	1+2	0	0	0	0+6	0
19	FW	(Sweden) SWE	Jordan Larsson	11	3	11	3	0	0	0	0	0	0

=== Goal scorers ===
Place	Position	Nation	Number	Name	Allsvenskan	2021–22 Svenska Cupen	2022–23 Svenska Cupen	UEFA Europa Conference League	Total
1	FW	(Argentina)	9	Nicolás Stefanelli	9	0	1	1	11
1	MF	(Sweden)	10	Nabil Bahoui	6	4	1	0	11
3	MF	(Sweden)	7	Sebastian Larsson	5	1	1	1	8
4	FW	(Sweden)	11	John Guidetti	5	0	0	1	6
5	MF	(Sweden)	26	Yasin Ayari	4	0	0	1	5
6	FW	(Sweden)	19	Jordan Larsson	3	0	0	0	3
7	DF	(Sweden)	5	Alexander Milošević	2	0	0	0	2
7	DF	(Kenya)	25	Erick Otieno	2	0	0	0	2
7	DF	(Sweden)	33	Mikael Lustig	2	0	0	0	2
7	MF	(Republic of Ireland)	20	Zack Elbouzedi	1	1	0	0	2
7	DF	(Sweden)	2	Josafat Mendes	1	0	0	1	2
12	DF	(Sweden)	4	Sotirios Papagiannopoulos	1	0	0	0	1
12	FW	(Sweden)	22	Benjamin Kimpioka	1	0	0	0	1
12	MF	(Sweden)	18	Amar Ahmed	1	0	0	0	1
12	MF	(Luxembourg)	17	Vincent Thill	1	0	0	0	1
12	FW	(Kenya)	30	Henry Atola	0	1	0	0	1
12	GK	(Sweden)	34	Erik Ring	0	0	1	0	1
12	DF	(Sweden)	12	Axel Björnström	0	0	0	1	1
12				Own goal	1	0	0	0	1
TOTALS					45	9	4	6	64

=== Clean sheets ===
Place	Position	Nation	Number	Name	Allsvenskan	2021–22 Svenska Cupen	2022–23 Svenska Cupen	UEFA Europa Conference League	Total
1	GK	(Sweden)	15	Kristoffer Nordfeldt	8	2	0	0	10
2	GK	(Serbia)	23	Budimir Janošević	1	0	0	0	1
TOTALS					9	2	0	0	11

=== Disciplinary record ===
Number	Nation	Position	Name	Allsvenskan		2021–22 Svenska Cupen		2022–23 Svenska Cupen		UEFA Europa Conference League		Total	
Number	Nation	Position	Name	Booked	Sent off (straight red)	Booked	Sent off (straight red)	Booked	Sent off (straight red)	Booked	Sent off (straight red)	Booked	Sent off (straight red)
2	(Sweden)	DF	Josafat Mendes	2	0	1	0	0	0	0	0	3	0
4	(Sweden)	DF	Sotirios Papagiannopoulos	8	0	0	0	0	0	2	0	10	0
5	(Sweden)	DF	Alexander Milošević	5	0	0	0	0	0	1	0	6	0
7	(Sweden)	MF	Sebastian Larsson	10	0	1	0	0	0	2	0	13	0
8	(Sweden)	MF	Bilal Hussein	4	0	1	0	0	0	1	0	6	0
9	(Argentina)	FW	Nicolás Stefanelli	2	0	1	0	0	0	1	0	4	0
10	(Sweden)	MF	Nabil Bahoui	2	0	2	0	0	0	1	0	5	0
11	(Sweden)	FW	John Guidetti	4	1	0	0	0	0	1	0	5	1
12	(Sweden)	DF	Axel Björnström	4	0	0	0	0	0	1	0	5	0
15	(Sweden)	GK	Kristoffer Nordfeldt	2	0	0	0	0	0	0	0	2	0
17	(Luxembourg)	MF	Vincent Thill	1	1	0	0	0	0	0	0	1	1
20	(Republic of Ireland)	MF	Zack Elbouzedi	2	0	1	0	0	0	0	0	3	0
23	(Serbia)	GK	Budimir Janošević	1	0	0	0	0	0	0	0	1	0
24	(Sweden)	MF	Jesper Ceesay	3	0	0	0	0	0	0	0	3	0
25	(Kenya)	DF	Erick Otieno	5	0	1	0	0	0	3	0	9	0
26	(Sweden)	MF	Yasin Ayari	6	1	0	0	0	0	0	0	6	1
29	(Kenya)	DF	Collins Sichenje	2	1	0	0	0	0	2	0	4	1
30	(Kenya)	FW	Henry Atola	1	0	0	0	0	0	0	0	1	0
33	(Sweden)	DF	Mikael Lustig	3	0	2	1	0	0	0	0	5	1
34	(Sweden)	FW	Erik Ring	1	0	0	0	0	0	1	0	2	0
Players away on loan:
Players who left AIK during the season:
18	(Sweden)	MF	Amar Ahmed	0	0	1	0	0	0	1	0	2	0
Total				68	4	11	1	0	0	17	0	96	5
