= 2021 AIK Fotboll season =

AIK
2021 season
- Owner: Robert Falck
- Manager: Bartosz Grzelak
- Stadium: Friends Arena
- Allsvenskan: 2nd
- 2020–21 Svenska Cupen: Group Stage
- 2021–22 Svenska Cupen: Progressed to 2022 season
- Top goalscorer: League: Nicolás Stefanelli (12); All: Nicolás Stefanelli (12)
- Highest home attendance: 42,539 vs Djurgården (3 October 2021)
- Lowest home attendance: 0 vs AFC Eskilstuna (27 February 2021)
- Average home league attendance: 11,587 (4 December 2021)
Home colours	Away colours

The 2021 season was AIK 130th in existence, their 93nd season in Allsvenskan and their 16th consecutive season in the league.

== Season events ==
On 23 December 2020, AIK announced that Samuel Brolin had joined Mjällby on a season-long loan deal for the upcoming season.

On 21 January, AIK announced the signing of Jetmir Haliti from Jönköpings Södra to a three-year contract.

On 1 February, AIK announced that they'd agreed a deal with Groningen for Paulos Abraham, that would see him initially join the Eredivisie club on loan, and then join permanently on 1 July.

On 22 February, AIK announced the signing of Lucas Forsberg from Sollentuna to a three-year contract.

On 26 February, AIK announced the return of Nicolás Stefanelli, signing a three-year contract from Unión La Calera.

On 29 March, AIK announced the return of Alexander Milošević, to a one-year contract from Vejle, with the option of two more years. On the same day, Robin Tihi joined AFC Eskilstuna on a season-long loan deal.

On 15 July, AIK announced the signing of Zack Elbouzedi from Lincoln City to a four-year contract.

On 24 July, AIK announced that Eric Kahl had joined AGF.

On 9 August, AIK announced the signing of Kristoffer Nordfeldt from Gençlerbirliği on a contract until the end of the season. Two days later, 11 August, AIK announced that Felix Melki had joined AFC Eskilstuna on loan for the remainder of the season.

On 3 September, AIK announced the signing of Henry Atola from Tusker, with the player officially joining on 1 January 2022 on a contract until 1 September 2026.

== Squad ==
As of match played 4 December 2021

No.	Name	Nationality	Position	Date of birth (age)	Signed from	Signed in	Contract ends	Apps.	Goals
Goalkeepers
13	Kyriakos Stamatopoulos	(Canada)	GK	28 August 1979 (aged 42)	Tromsø	2011		58	0
15	Kristoffer Nordfeldt	(Sweden)	GK	23 June 1989 (aged 32)	Gençlerbirliği	2021	2021	15	0
23	Budimir Janošević	(Serbia)	GK	21 October 1989 (aged 32)	Brommapojkarna	2018		53	0
31	Jakob Haugaard	(Denmark)	GK	1 May 1992 (aged 29)	Stoke City	2020		16	0
Defenders
3	Per Karlsson	(Sweden)	DF	2 January 1986 (aged 35)	Academy	2003		446	5
4	Sotirios Papagiannopoulos	(Sweden)	DF	5 September 1990 (aged 31)	Copenhagen	2020		45	2
5	Alexander Milošević	(Sweden)	DF	30 January 1992 (aged 29)	Vejle	2021	2021 (+2)	147	8
6	Jetmir Haliti	(Kosovo)	DF	14 September 1996 (aged 25)	Jönköpings Södra	2021	2023	4	0
14	Lucas Forsberg	(Sweden)	DF	21 May 2003 (aged 18)	Sollentuna	2021	2023	1	0
25	Erick Otieno	(Kenya)	DF	27 September 1996 (aged 25)	Vasalund	2020		39	1
33	Mikael Lustig	(Sweden)	DF	21 May 2003 (aged 18)	Gent	2020		29	0
37	Ahmad Faqa	(Sweden)	DF	10 January 2003 (aged 18)	Academy	2021		0	0
Midfielders
7	Sebastian Larsson	(Sweden)	MF	6 June 1985 (aged 36)	Hull City	2018		103	22
8	Bilal Hussein	(Sweden)	MF	22 April 2000 (aged 21)	Academy	2018		86	4
10	Nabil Bahoui	(Sweden)	MF	5 February 1991 (aged 30)	De Graafschap	2019		150	53
17	Ebenezer Ofori	(Ghana)	MF	1 July 1995 (aged 26)	VfB Stuttgart	2020		139	6
19	Saku Ylätupa	(Finland)	MF	4 August 1999 (aged 22)	AFC Ajax	2019		37	4
20	Zack Elbouzedi	(Republic of Ireland)	MF	5 April 1998 (aged 23)	Lincoln City	2021	2024	21	2
22	Filip Rogić	(Sweden)	MF	14 June 1993 (aged 28)	Orenburg	2020		29	4
26	Yasin Ayari	(Sweden)	MF	6 October 2003 (aged 18)	Academy	2020		15	2
28	Calvin Kabuye	(Sweden)	MF	28 March 2003 (aged 18)	Academy	2021		0	0
46	Amar Abdirahman Ahmed	(Sweden)	MF	19 February 2004 (aged 17)	Academy	2020		1	0
Forwards
9	Nicolás Stefanelli	(Argentina)	FW	22 November 1994 (aged 27)	Unión La Calera	2021	2023	74	29
11	Stefan Silva	(Sweden)	FW	11 March 1990 (aged 31)	Palermo	2018		42	2
21	Bojan Radulović	(Serbia)	FW	9 December 1999 (aged 21)	Brighton & Hove Albion	2020		31	4
34	Erik Ring	(Sweden)	FW	24 April 2002 (aged 19)	Academy	2020		30	3
36	Henok Goitom	(Eritrea)	FW	22 September 1984 (aged 37)	San Jose Earthquakes	2017		290	100
Out on loan
12	Felix Melki	(Lebanon)	DF	23 July 1994 (aged 27)	AFC Eskilstuna	2019		22	0
16	Robin Tihi	(Finland)	DF	16 March 2002 (aged 19)	Academy	2020		19	1
32	Tom Strannegård	(Sweden)	MF	29 April 2002 (aged 19)	Academy	2019		32	2
35	Samuel Brolin	(Sweden)	GK	29 September 2000 (aged 21)	Academy	2019		0	0
44	Joshua Sivertsen	(Sweden)	DF	20 May 2003 (aged 18)	Academy	2021		1	0
46	Rasmus Bonde	(Sweden)	DF	1 February 2003 (aged 18)	Academy	2021		1	0
Left during the season
29	Eric Kahl	(Sweden)	DF	27 September 2001 (aged 20)	Academy	2019			

=== Out on loan ===
Note: Flags indicate national team as defined under FIFA eligibility rules; some limited exceptions apply. Players may hold more than one non-FIFA nationality.

No.	Pos.	Nation	Player
12	MF	LBN	Felix Melki (at AFC Eskilstuna until 31 December 2021)
16	DF	FIN	Robin Tihi (at AFC Eskilstuna until 31 December 2021)

No.	Pos.	Nation	Player
32	MF	SWE	Tom Strannegård (at Start until 31 December 2021)
35	GK	SWE	Samuel Brolin (to Mjällby until 31 December 2021)

== Transfers ==
=== In ===
Date	Position	Nationality	Name	From	Fee	Ref.
21 January 2021	DF	(Sweden)	Jetmir Haliti	Jönköpings Södra	Undisclosed	
22 February 2021	DF	(Sweden)	Lucas Forsberg	Sollentuna	Undisclosed	
26 February 2021	FW	(Argentina)	Nicolás Stefanelli	Unión La Calera	Undisclosed	
29 March 2021	DF	(Sweden)	Alexander Milošević	Vejle	Undisclosed	
15 July 2021	MF	(Republic of Ireland)	Zack Elbouzedi	Lincoln City	Undisclosed	
9 August 2021	GK	(Sweden)	Kristoffer Nordfeldt	Gençlerbirliği	Undisclosed	

=== Out ===
Date	Position	Nationality	Name	To	Fee	Ref.
1 July 2021	FW	(Sweden)	Paulos Abraham	Groningen	Undisclosed	
24 July 2021	DF	(Sweden)	Eric Kahl	AGF	Undisclosed	

=== Loans out ===
Start date	Position	Nationality	Name	To	End date	Ref.
23 December 2020	GK	(Sweden)	Samuel Brolin	Mjällby	31 December 2021	
1 February 2021	FW	(Sweden)	Paulos Abraham	Groningen	30 June 2021	
29 March 2021	DF	(Finland)	Robin Tihi	AFC Eskilstuna	31 December 2021	
11 August 2021	DF	(Lebanon)	Felix Melki	AFC Eskilstuna	31 December 2021	

=== Released ===
Date	Position	Nationality	Name	Joined	Date	Ref
31 December 2021	FW	(Sweden)	Stefan Silva			
31 December 2021	FW	(Eritrea)	Henok Goitom	Retired		

== Friendlies ==
30 January 2021	AIK	0–2	Vasalund	Stockholm
13:00 CET (UTC+1)		Report		Stadium: Friends Arena

12 February 2021	AIK	1–0	Elfsborg	Stockholm
17:00 CET (UTC+1)		Report		Stadium: Friends Arena

14 March 2021	AIK	1–2	Brommapojkarna	Stockholm
14:00 CET (UTC+1)		Report		Stadium: Friends Arena

20 March 2021	Elfsborg	0–2	AIK	Borås
13:00 CET (UTC+1)		Report		Stadium: Borås Arena

26 March 2021	Örebro	2–3	AIK	Örebro
14:00 CET (UTC+1)		Report		Stadium: Behrn Arena

4 April 2021	AIK	1–1	GIF Sundsvall	Stockholm
15:00 CEST (UTC+2)		Report		Stadium: Friends Arena

20 June 2021	AIK	3–3	Sirius	Enköping
15:00 CET (UTC+1)		Report		Stadium: Enavallen

28 June 2021	AIK	0–1	Östersund	Norrtälje
12:00 CET (UTC+1)		Report		Stadium: Norrtälje Sportcentrum

== Competitions ==
=== Overview ===
Competition	First match	Last match	Starting round	Final position	Record							
Competition	First match	Last match	Starting round	Final position	Pld	W	D	L	GF	GA	GD	Win %
Allsvenskan	12 April 2021	4 December 2021	Matchday 1	Runners-up	30	18	5	7	45	25	+20	60.00
2020–21 Svenska Cupen	20 February 2021	7 March 2021	Group stage	Group stage	3	2	0	1	8	4	+4	66.67
2021–22 Svenska Cupen	19 August 2021	See 2022 season	Second round	See 2022 season	1	1	0	0	5	0	+5	100.00
Total					34	21	5	8	58	29	+29	61.76

Last updated: 4 December 2021
Source: Competitions

=== Allsvenskan ===
==== League table ====
Pos	Team	Pld	W	D	L	GF	GA	GD	Pts	Qualification or relegation
1	Malmö FF (C)	30	17	8	5	58	30	+28	59	Qualification for the Champions League first qualifying round
2	AIK	30	18	5	7	45	25	+20	59	Qualification for the Europa Conference League second qualifying round
3	Djurgårdens IF	30	17	6	7	46	30	+16	57	Qualification for the Europa Conference League second qualifying round
4	IF Elfsborg	30	17	4	9	51	35	+16	55	Qualification for the Europa Conference League second qualifying round
5	Hammarby IF	30	15	8	7	54	41	+13	53	

Source: svenskfotboll.se (in Swedish)
Rules for classification: 1) Points; 2) Goal difference; 3) Goals scored; 4) Head-to-head points; 5) Head-to-head goal difference; 6) Head-to-head away goals scored; 7) Play-off
(Note: Play-off is only played if need to decide champion, teams for relegation or UEFA competition and will be played on a neutral ground).
(C) Champions

==== Results summary ====
Overall								Home						Away					
Pld	W	D	L	GF	GA	GD	Pts	W	D	L	GF	GA	GD	W	D	L	GF	GA	GD
30	18	5	7	45	25	+20	59	13	2	0	29	8	+21	5	3	7	16	17	−1

Last updated: 4 December 2022.
Source: Results

==== Results ====
12 April 2021 1	AIK	2–0	Degerfors	Stockholm
19:00 CEST (UTC+2)	Ylätupa 38' (yellow card) 45+1'; Bahoui 65'	Report		Stadium: Friends Arena; Attendance: 8 Referee: Bojan Pandžić

19 April 2021 2	IFK Göteborg	2–0	AIK	Gothenburg
19:00 CEST (UTC+2)	Sigþórsson 3', 38' (yellow card) 33'; Aiesh (yellow card) 25'; Eriksson (yellow card) 60'	Report	Radulović (yellow card) 22'; Silva (yellow card) 81'	Stadium: Gamla Ullevi; Attendance: 8 Referee: Andreas Ekberg

25 April 2021 3	AIK	2–0	Hammarby	Stockholm
17:30 CEST (UTC+2)	Stefanelli 43'; Larsson (yellow card) 72'; Bahoui 77'; Papagiannopoulos (yellow card) 80'; Ylätupa (yellow card) 85'	Report	Selmani (yellow card) 53'; Fjóluson (yellow card) 60'; Sher (yellow card) 81'	Stadium: Friends Arena; Attendance: 8 Referee: Glenn Nyberg

2 May 2021 4	AIK	1–0	Elfsborg	Stockholm
17:30 CEST (UTC+2)	Larsson 49' (pen.)	Report	Gojani (yellow card) 16'; Ndione (yellow card) 44'	Stadium: Friends Arena; Attendance: 8 Referee: Mohammed Al-Hakim

10 May 2021 5	IFK Norrköping	2–0	AIK	Norrköping
18:30 CEST (UTC+2)	Jóhannesson (yellow card) 37'; Adegbenro 62', 86' (yellow card) 87'	Report	Larsson (yellow card) 81'	Stadium: Nya Parken; Attendance: 8 Referee: Kristoffer Karlsson

13 May 2021 6	AIK	1–1	Malmö	Stockholm
18:30 CEST (UTC+2)	Otieno (yellow card) 55'; Nielsen 64' (o.g.); Larsson (yellow card) 77'; Hussein (yellow card) 82'	Report	Knudsen (yellow card) 12'; Berget 24'; Christiansen (yellow card) 41'; Vagić (yellow card) 55'	Stadium: Friends Arena; Attendance: 8 Referee: Glenn Nyberg

17 May 2021 7	Östersund	1–2	AIK	Östersund
18:30 CEST (UTC+2)	Fritzson (yellow card) 71'; Turgott 77'; Dosis (yellow card) 89'	Report	Strannegård 12'; Goitom 26'; Janošević (yellow card) 88'	Stadium: Jämtkraft Arena; Attendance: 8 Referee: Adam Ladebäck

22 May 2021 8	AIK	2–2	Mjällby	Stockholm
18:30 CEST (UTC+2)	Stefanelli 11', 82'; Bahoui (yellow card) 87'; Larsson (yellow card) 90+3'	Report	Hodžić (yellow card) 31'; Nilsson (yellow card) 58'; Moro 64', 71'; Gustavsson (yellow card) 90+4'	Stadium: Friends Arena; Attendance: 8 Referee: Fredrik Klitte

4 July 2021 9	BK Häcken	2–1	AIK	Gothenburg
15:00 CEST (UTC+2)	Wålemark 47'; Friberg (yellow card) 49'; Youssef 50'; Bengtsson (yellow card) 88'	Report	Ofori (yellow card) 22'; Karlsson (yellow card) 28'; Papagiannopoulos (yellow card) 31'; Janošević (yellow card) 48'; Radulović 78'	Stadium: Bravida Arena; Attendance: 1,005; Referee: Kristoffer Karlsson

10 July 2021 10	AIK	2–1	Varbergs BoIS	Stockholm
17:30 CEST (UTC+2)	Radulović 37'; Kahl (yellow card) 58'; Rogić 77'	Report	Simović (yellow card) 17'; Matthews 23'; Winbo (yellow card) 40'	Stadium: Friends Arena; Attendance: 12,342; Referee: Mohammed Al-Hakim

18 July 2021 11	AIK	2–0	Kalmar	Stockholm
17:30 CEST (UTC+2)	Larsson (yellow card) 14' (goal) 90+1'; Papagiannopoulos (yellow card) 40'; Milošević 58'; Hussein (yellow card) 90+3'	Report	Ring (yellow card) 61'	Stadium: Friends Arena; Attendance: 12,517; Referee: Glenn Nyberg

26 July 2021 12	Örebro	1–1	AIK	Örebro
19:00 CEST (UTC+2)	Collander 26'; Mårtensson (yellow card) 68'; Allain (yellow card) 82'; Skovgaard (yellow card) 90+3'	Report	Ouma (yellow card) 14'; Bahoui 61'; Milošević (yellow card) 81'	Stadium: Eyravallen; Attendance: 3,948; Referee: Granite Macedonci

2 August 2021 13	AIK	1–0	Halmstad	Stockholm
19:00 CEST (UTC+2)	Stefanelli 22'; Rogić (yellow card) 51'; Strannegård (yellow card) 88'	Report	Baffo (yellow card) 90+4'	Stadium: Friends Arena; Attendance: 12,112; Referee: Kristoffer Karlsson

8 August 2021 14	Djurgården	1–4	AIK	Stockholm
15:00 CEST (UTC+2)	Radetinac 29'; Löfgren (yellow card) 89'; Une Larsson (yellow card) 90+1'	Report	Goitom 8'; Larsson 50'; Otieno (yellow card) 65'; Stefanelli 69'; Milošević 80'	Stadium: Tele2 Arena; Attendance: 8,712; Referee: Mohammed Al-Hakim

16 August 2021 15	IK Sirius	0–1	AIK	Uppsala
19:00 CEST (UTC+2)	Shabani (yellow card) 36'; Sylisufaj (yellow card) 81'	Report	Lustig (yellow card) 39'; Larsson (yellow card) 60'; Radulović 89'; Erik Ring (yellow card) 90+2'	Stadium: Studenternas IP; Attendance: 3,073; Referee: Victor Wolf

22 August 2021 16	AIK	2–1	BK Häcken	Stockholm
17:30 CEST (UTC+2)	Papagiannopoulos 3'; Hussein 51'	Report	Nordfeldt 78' (o.g.); Hammar (yellow card) 90+4'	Stadium: Friends Arena; Attendance: 12,313; Referee: Andreas Ekberg

28 August 2021 17	AIK	2–0	Örebro	Stockholm
15:00 CEST (UTC+2)	Milošević 17'; Moro 30' (o.g.); Larsson (yellow card) 72'	Report	Moro (yellow card) 1'; Walker (yellow card) 11'; Ali (yellow card) 31'	Stadium: Friends Arena; Attendance: 12,727; Referee: Kristoffer Karlsson

13 September 2021 18	Mjällby	0–0	AIK	Hällevik
19:00 CEST (UTC+2)	A.Sarr (yellow card) 34'	Report	Milošević (yellow card) 5'	Stadium: Strandvallen; Attendance: 1,496; Referee: Granite Macedonci

20 September 2021 19	AIK	3–1	IFK Göteborg	Stockholm
19:00 CEST (UTC+2)	Bahoui 5', 13'; Ouma 33'; Larsson (yellow card) 56'	Report	Thern (yellow card) 23' (goal) 25'	Stadium: Friends Arena; Attendance: 14,007; Referee: Adam Ladebäck

23 September 2021 20	Kalmar	1–1	AIK	Hällevik
19:00 CEST (UTC+2)	Sjöstedt (yellow card) 37'; Berg 66'	Report	Milošević (yellow card) 60'; Bahoui 90'; Larsson (yellow card) 90+1'; Lustig (yellow card) 90+1'	Stadium: Strandvallen; Attendance: 4,315; Referee: Andreas Ekberg

27 September 2021 21	Degerfors	2–1	AIK	Degerfors
19:00 CEST (UTC+2)	Edvardsen 2', 66'; Sabetkar (yellow card) 17'; Đurđić (yellow card) 58'	Report	Ouma (yellow card) 85'; Bahoui 90'	Stadium: Stora Valla; Attendance: 1,602; Referee: Victor Wolf

3 October 2021 22	AIK	1–0	Djurgården	Stockholm
15:00 CEST (UTC+2)	Stefanelli 45+2' (yellow card) 28' (yellow-red card) 45+2'; Larsson (yellow card) 61'; Nordfeldt (yellow card) 77'	Report	Schüller (red card) 11'; Holmberg (yellow card) 16'; Asoro (yellow card) 42'	Stadium: Friends Arena; Attendance: 42,539; Referee: Glenn Nyberg

17 October 2021 23	Hammarby	1–0	AIK	Stockholm
15:00 CEST (UTC+2)	Swedberg (yellow card) 41'; Magyar (yellow card) 52'; Amoo 58'	Report	Papagiannopoulos (yellow card) 77'	Stadium: Tele2 Arena; Attendance: 29,317; Referee: Andreas Ekberg

24 October 2021 24	AIK	1–0	IFK Norrköping	Stockholm
17:30 CEST (UTC+2)	Stefanelli 24'; Lustig (yellow card) 45'	Report	Abdulrazak (yellow card) 7'; Levi (yellow card) 70'	Stadium: Friends Arena; Attendance: 23,546; Referee: Kristoffer Karlsson

27 October 2021 25	Malmö	1–0	AIK	Malmö
19:00 CEST (UTC+2)	Birmančević 25'; Nielsen (yellow card) 74'; Rakip (yellow card) 85'	Report	Elbouzedi (yellow card) 57'	Stadium: Eleda Stadion; Attendance: 18,821; Referee: Mohammed Al-Hakim

1 November 2021 26	Halmstad	1–0	AIK	Halmstad
19:00 CET (UTC+1)	An.Johansson 45+4'; Kurtulus (yellow card) 90+2'; Al.Johansson (yellow card) 90+7'	Report	Larsson (yellow card) 45+4'; Milošević (yellow card) 61'; Bahoui (yellow card) 68'	Stadium: Örjans Vall; Attendance: 4,594; Referee: Victor Wolf

7 November 2021 27	AIK	3–0	Östersund	Stockholm
15:00 CET (UTC+1)	Stefanelli 27'; Elbouzedi (yellow card) 29' (goal) 62'; Bahoui 73'	Report	Colkett (yellow card) 79'	Stadium: Friends Arena; Attendance: 15,515; Referee: Granite Macedonci

21 November 2021 28	Varbergs BoIS	0–1	AIK	Varberg
17:30 CET (UTC+1)	Le Roux (yellow card) 31'; Matthews (yellow card) 50'; Alfonsi (yellow card) 85'	Report	Bahoui 62'; Larsson (yellow card) 68'; Milošević (yellow card) 90+2'	Stadium: Påskbergsvallen; Attendance: 2,566; Referee: Bojan Pandzic

29 November 2021 29	Elfsborg	2–4	AIK	Borås
19:00 CET (UTC+1)	Alm 12', 41' (yellow card) 43'; Guðjohnsen (yellow card) 90+4'	Report	Bahoui 27'; Rogić 54'; Stefanelli 56', 77'; Papagiannopoulos (yellow card) 82'	Stadium: Borås Arena; Attendance: 10,157; Referee: Glenn Nyberg

4 December 2021 30	AIK	4–2	IK Sirius	Stockholm
15:00 CET (UTC+1)	Stefanelli 25', 45+2'; Papagiannopoulos 47'; Goitom 90+2'	Report	Ståhl 13'; Kouakou 21'; Sylisufaj (yellow card) 90+1'	Stadium: Friends Arena; Attendance: 27,731; Referee: Mohammed Al-Hakim

=== 2020–21 Svenska Cupen ===
==== Group stage ====
Pos	Team	Pld	W	D	L	GF	GA	GD	Pts	Qualification
1	Hammarby IF	3	3	0	0	10	3	+7	9	Advance to Knockout stage
2	AIK	3	2	0	1	8	4	+4	6	
3	AFC Eskilstuna	3	1	0	2	5	9	−4	3	
4	Oskarshamns AIK	3	0	0	3	2	9	−7	0	

Updated to match(es) played on 7 March 2021. Source: SFA
Rules for classification: 1) Points; 2) Goal difference; 3) Goals scored; 4) Head-to-head record; 5) Highest ranked team

20 February 2021 1	Oskarshamns AIK	1–2	AIK	Oskarshamn
15:00 CET (UTC+1)	M.Persson (yellow card) 34'; O.Stejdahl (yellow card) 42' (goal) 56'; F.Jägerbrink (yellow card) 45'; A.Agebjörn (yellow card) 49'; S.Östlund (yellow card) 71'	Report	Goitom 29'; M.Persson 53' (o.g.); Papagiannopoulos (yellow card) 54'; Tihi (yellow card) 76'	Stadium: Arena Oskarshamn; Attendance: 0 Referee: Fredrik Klitte

27 February 2021 2	AIK	4–0	AFC Eskilstuna	Stockholm
13:00 CET (UTC+1)	Larsson 8', 41'; Goitom 24'; Rogić 47'	Report	V.Fors (yellow card) 39'; Sabah (yellow card) 87'	Stadium: Friends Arena; Attendance: 0 Referee: Glenn Nyberg

7 March 2021 3	Hammarby	3–2	AIK	Stockholm
13:00 CET (UTC+1)	Amoo 19'; Rodić 56' (yellow card) 85'; Magyar (red card) 64'; Khalili (yellow card) 71'; Andersen (yellow card) 73'; Ludwigson 82'	Report	Ylätupa 49'; Otieno (yellow card) 71'; Larsson 75' (pen.); Goitom (yellow card) 77'	Stadium: Tele2 Arena; Attendance: 0 Referee: Mohammed Al-Hakim

=== 2021–22 Svenska Cupen ===
19 August 2021 Second round	Rågsved	0–5	AIK	Stockholm
18:30 CEST (UTC+2)	F.Notice (yellow card) 44'; V.Pidre (yellow card) 47'; A.Bazoukou (yellow card) 85'	Report	Radulović 3'; Ayari 18'; Karlsson (yellow card) 27'; Ring 60', 66'; Elbouzedi 72'	Stadium: Hagsätra Idrottsplats; Referee: Farouk Nehdi

Progressed to the 2022 season

== Squad statistics ==
As of match played 4 December 2021

=== Appearances and goals ===
No.	Pos	Nat	Player	Total		Allsvenskan		2020–21 Svenska Cupen		2021–22 Svenska Cupen	
No.	Pos	Nat	Player	Apps	Goals	Apps	Goals	Apps	Goals	Apps	Goals
3	DF	(Sweden) SWE	Per Karlsson	10	0	2+6	0	1	0	1	0
4	DF	(Sweden) SWE	Sotirios Papagiannopoulos	32	2	29	2	2	0	1	0
5	DF	(Sweden) SWE	Alexander Milošević	27	3	26+1	3	0	0	0	0
6	DF	(Kosovo) KOS	Jetmir Haliti	4	0	1+3	0	0	0	0	0
7	MF	(Sweden) SWE	Sebastian Larsson	28	6	25	3	3	3	0	0
8	MF	(Sweden) SWE	Bilal Hussein	33	1	30	1	3	0	0	0
9	FW	(Argentina) ARG	Nicolás Stefanelli	30	12	28+1	12	0+1	0	0	0
10	MF	(Sweden) SWE	Nabil Bahoui	30	10	21+6	10	1+1	0	0+1	0
11	FW	(Sweden) SWE	Stefan Silva	7	0	1+4	0	0+1	0	0+1	0
14	DF	(Sweden) SWE	Lucas Forsberg	1	0	0	0	0	0	0+1	0
15	GK	(Sweden) SWE	Kristoffer Nordfeldt	15	0	14	0	0	0	1	0
17	MF	(Ghana) GHA	Ebenezer Ofori	17	0	4+12	0	0	0	1	0
19	MF	(Finland) FIN	Saku Ylätupa	15	2	10+1	1	3	1	1	0
20	MF	(Republic of Ireland) IRL	Zack Elbouzedi	21	2	18+2	1	0	0	0+1	1
21	FW	(Serbia) SRB	Bojan Radulović	28	4	6+20	3	0+1	0	1	1
22	MF	(Sweden) SWE	Filip Rogić	18	3	8+8	2	2	1	0	0
23	GK	(Serbia) SRB	Budimir Janošević	19	0	16	0	3	0	0	0
25	DF	(Kenya) KEN	Erick Otieno	33	1	29	1	3	0	1	0
26	MF	(Sweden) SWE	Yasin Ayari	14	1	3+9	0	0+1	0	1	1
33	DF	(Sweden) SWE	Mikael Lustig	29	0	27	0	2	0	0	0
34	FW	(Sweden) SWE	Erik Ring	19	2	10+7	0	0+1	0	1	2
36	FW	(Eritrea) ERI	Henok Goitom	32	5	17+12	3	3	2	0	0
44	DF	(Sweden) SWE	Joshua Sivertsen	1	0	0	0	0	0	0+1	0
46	MF	(Sweden) SWE	Amar Abdirahman Ahmed	1	0	0+1	0	0	0	0	0
Players away on loan:
12	MF	(Lebanon) LBN	Felix Melki	2	0	0	0	0+2	0	0	0
16	DF	(Finland) FIN	Robin Tihi	3	0	0	0	1+2	0	0	0
32	MF	(Sweden) SWE	Tom Strannegård	18	1	3+11	1	3	0	1	0
46	DF	(Sweden) SWE	Rasmus Bonde	1	0	0	0	0	0	1	0
Players who appeared for AIK but left during the season:
29	DF	(Sweden) SWE	Eric Kahl	6	0	2+1	0	3	0	0	0

=== Goal scorers ===
Place	Position	Nation	Number	Name	Allsvenskan	2020–21 Svenska Cupen	2021–22 Svenska Cupen	Total
1	FW	(Argentina)	9	Nicolás Stefanelli	12	0	0	12
2	MF	(Sweden)	10	Nabil Bahoui	10	0	0	10
3	MF	(Sweden)	7	Sebastian Larsson	3	3	0	6
4	FW	(Eritrea)	36	Henok Goitom	3	2	0	5
5	FW	(Serbia)	21	Bojan Radulović	3	0	1	4
6	DF	(Sweden)	5	Alexander Milošević	3	0	0	3
6	MF	(Sweden)	22	Filip Rogić	2	1	0	3
6				Own goal	2	1	0	3
9	DF	(Sweden)	4	Sotirios Papagiannopoulos	2	0	0	2
9	MF	(Finland)	19	Saku Ylätupa	1	1	0	2
9	MF	(Republic of Ireland)	20	Zack Elbouzedi	1	0	1	2
9	FW	(Sweden)	34	Erik Ring	0	0	2	2
13	MF	(Sweden)	12	Bilal Hussein	1	0	0	1
13	DF	(Kenya)	25	Erick Otieno	1	0	0	1
13	FW	(Sweden)	32	Tom Strannegård	1	0	0	1
13	MF	(Sweden)	26	Yasin Ayari	0	0	1	1
Total					45	8	5	58

=== Clean sheets ===
Place	Position	Nation	Number	Name	Allsvenskan	2020–21 Svenska Cupen	2021–22 Svenska Cupen	Total
1	GK	(Serbia)	23	Budimir Janošević	6	1	0	7
1	GK	(Sweden)	15	Kristoffer Nordfeldt	6	0	1	7
TOTALS					12	1	1	14

=== Disciplinary record ===
Number	Nation	Position	Name	Allsvenskan		2020–21 Svenska Cupen		2021–22 Svenska Cupen		Total	
Number	Nation	Position	Name	Booked	Sent off (straight red)	Booked	Sent off (straight red)	Booked	Sent off (straight red)	Booked	Sent off (straight red)
3	(Sweden)	DF	Per Karlsson	1	0	0	0	1	0	2	0
4	(Sweden)	DF	Sotirios Papagiannopoulos	5	0	1	0	0	0	6	0
5	(Sweden)	DF	Alexander Milošević	5	0	0	0	0	0	5	0
7	(Sweden)	MF	Sebastian Larsson	12	0	0	0	0	0	12	0
8	(Sweden)	MF	Bilal Hussein	2	0	0	0	0	0	2	0
9	(Argentina)	FW	Nicolás Stefanelli	2	1	0	0	0	0	2	1
10	(Sweden)	MF	Nabil Bahoui	2	0	0	0	0	0	2	0
11	(Sweden)	FW	Stefan Silva	1	0	0	0	0	0	1	0
15	(Sweden)	GK	Kristoffer Nordfeldt	1	0	0	0	0	0	1	0
17	(Ghana)	MF	Ebenezer Ofori	1	0	0	0	0	0	1	0
19	(Finland)	MF	Saku Ylätupa	2	0	0	0	0	0	2	0
20	(Republic of Ireland)	MF	Zack Elbouzedi	2	0	0	0	0	0	2	0
21	(Serbia)	FW	Bojan Radulović	1	0	0	0	0	0	1	0
22	(Sweden)	MF	Filip Rogić	1	0	0	0	0	0	1	0
23	(Serbia)	GK	Budimir Janošević	2	0	0	0	0	0	2	0
25	(Kenya)	DF	Erick Otieno	4	0	1	0	0	0	5	0
33	(Sweden)	DF	Mikael Lustig	3	0	0	0	0	0	3	0
34	(Sweden)	FW	Erik Ring	1	0	0	0	0	0	1	0
36	(Eritrea)	FW	Henok Goitom	0	0	1	0	0	0	1	0
Players away on loan:
16	(Finland)	DF	Robin Tihi	0	0	1	0	0	0	1	0
32	(Sweden)	MF	Tom Strannegård	1	0	0	0	0	0	1	0
Players who left AIK during the season:
29	(Sweden)	DF	Eric Kahl	1	0	0	0	0	0	1	0
Total				50	1	4	0	1	0	55	1
