= Kristoffer Nordfeldt =

Swedish footballer (born 1989)

- Nordfeldt with Sweden in 2026

Personal information
- Full name: Bo Kristoffer Nordfeldt
- Date of birth: 23 June 1989 (age 37)
- Place of birth: Stockholm, Sweden
- Height: 1.90 m (6 ft 3 in)
- Position: Goalkeeper

Team information
- Current team: AIK
- Number: 15

Youth career
- –2005: IF Brommapojkarna

Senior career*
Years	Team	Apps	(Gls)
2006–2011	IF Brommapojkarna	103	(0)
2012–2015	Heerenveen	112	(0)
2015–2019	Swansea City	24	(0)
2019–2021	Gençlerbirliği	50	(0)
2021–	AIK	154	(0)

International career
2006–2008	Sweden U19	4	(0)
2008–2010	Sweden U21	16	(0)
2011–2026	Sweden	23	(0)
- * Club domestic league appearances and goals as of 8 November 2026

Bo Kristoffer Nordfeldt (born 23 June 1989) is a Swedish professional footballer who plays as a goalkeeper for Allsvenskan club AIK.

A full international between 2011 and 2026, Nordfeldt won 23 caps for the Sweden national team. He represented his country at the 2018 FIFA World Cup, UEFA Euro 2020, and the 2026 FIFA World Cup.

== Club career ==
=== IF Brommapojkarna ===
Nordfeldt began his career in IF Brommapojkarna, famous for its academy. He was promoted to the first team for the season of 2006, when the team was playing in Superettan. Nordfeldt did not play any league matches that year or the following year when the team was playing for the first time in Allsvenskan.

In 2008, IF Brommapojkarna were back in Superettan and both goalkeepers, Mattias Asper and Kristoffer Björklund, had left the club. Nordfeldt started his first year as a senior and when the season ended, the club had seen a promotion back to the Allsvenskan. He had started 29 out of 30 league matches, conceding 27 goals, and achieving 12 clean sheets.

Nordfeldt signed a new contract in the beginning of 2009, keeping him at the club until 2012. As newcomers for the season of 2009, the club was seen as favourites for relegation, but finished a comfortable 12th. He made 21 league appearances, conceding 31 goals and keeping six clean sheets.

On 2 August 2010, there were several scouts spotted at Grimsta to watch the match between IF Brommapojkarna and the league leaders Helsingborgs IF. The clubs thought to be interested in Nordfeldt were Ajax, Borussia Mönchengladbach, Hannover 96, Heerenveen, and Sampdoria.

=== Heerenveen ===
On 6 March 2012, Nordfeldt signed a three-and-a-half-year deal at Dutch top flight club SC Heerenveen. He featured over 100 times for the Dutch side, helping them reach the Eredivisie play-offs for Europa League qualification in each of his three seasons at the club.

=== Swansea City ===
On 23 June 2015, Nordfeldt signed for Premier League side Swansea City on a three-year deal for an undisclosed fee. He was signed to compete with Łukasz Fabiański for the starting position, following the departures of goalkeepers Gerhard Tremmel and David Cornell earlier in that transfer window. Nordfeldt made his Swansea City debut on Tuesday 25 August in their League Cup match against York City where he played the full 90 minutes in a 3–0 win which resulted in his first clean sheet for the club. Nordfeldt made his Premier League debut in the last match of the season against Manchester City.

=== AIK ===
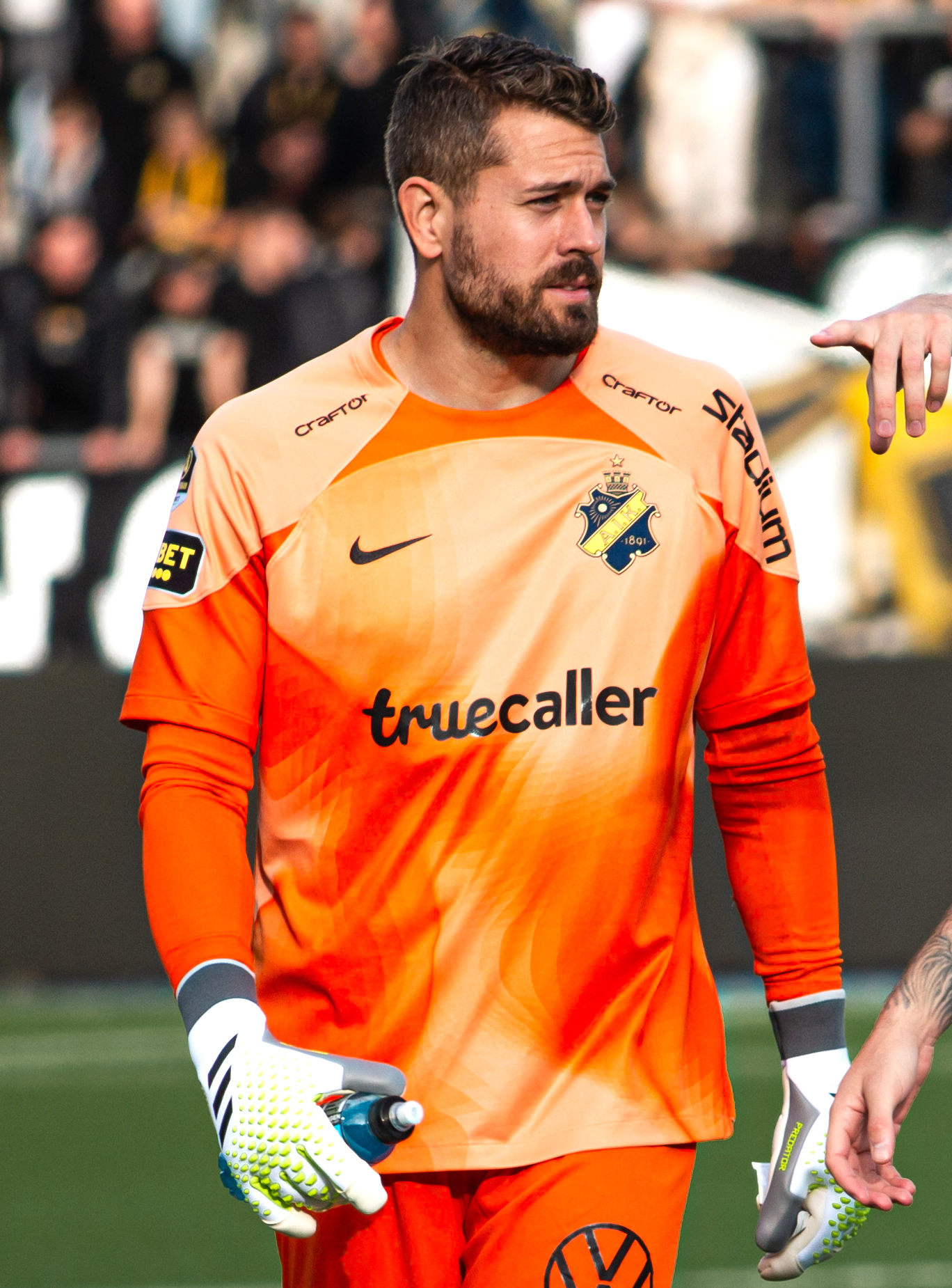
Nordfelt playing for AIK in 2023

On 9 August 2021, Nordfeldt signed a short-term contract with the Allsvenskan club AIK. The deal ran until 31 December 2021.

He made his debut for the club on 19 August 2021 in the second round of the 2021/2022 Swedish cup against Rågsveds IF. The match ended in a 5–0 victory for AIK, with two goals scored by Erik Ring, and Nordfeldt kept a clean sheet in his first appearance for the club. He made his Allsvenskan debut just three days later, when AIK defeated BK Häcken 2–1 at Friends Arena. His first clean sheet in the league came in the following match, a 2–0 win over Örebro SK on 28 August 2021.

At the end of December 2021, as his contract with the club was about to expire, Nordfeldt signed a four-year deal with AIK, keeping him at the club until 31 December 2025. In August 2025, he signed a new agreement extending his contract until 31 December 2027.

== International career ==
=== Youth ===
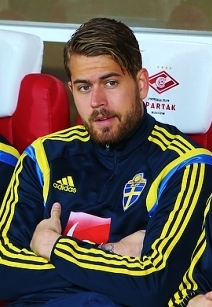
Nordfelt with Sweden in 2015

Between 2008 and 2010, Nordfeldt played 16 matches for the Sweden U21-team. In the race for the 2011 U21 European Championships, Sweden played 8 matches in their qualification group and 2 in the play-offs, all with Nordfeldt in the starting lineup, with a goal difference of 17–10.

=== Senior ===
==== Early career ====
Nordfeldt made his debut for Sweden on 22 January 2011 in a friendly match against South Africa Development team.

==== 2018 FIFA World Cup and UEFA Euro 2020 ====
In May 2018, he was named in the Sweden 23 man squad for the 2018 FIFA World Cup in Russia. Nordfeldt was also included in Sweden 26-man squad for UEFA Euro 2020.

==== 2026 FIFA World Cup and retirement ====
Nordfeldt delivered two notable performances for Sweden in the 2026 World Cup playoff, playing a key role in both matches as the team secured qualification. In the playoff semifinal against Ukraine on 26 March 2026, played in Spain (relocated due to the war in Ukraine), Sweden won 3–1. Nordfeldt started in goal and made a strong impact in what was his first competitive international appearance in several years. He assisted Viktor Gyökeres for one of the goals. Sweden controlled much of the game, and although they conceded late, Nordfeldt’s overall performance was considered both composed and decisive. In the playoff final against Poland on 31 March 2026, played in Stockholm, Sweden won 3–2 to secure a place in the 2026 World Cup. Nordfeldt once again started and played the full match.

At the 2026 FIFA World Cup, Nordfeldt played for 90 minutes in the first two group stage games before Sweden was eliminated by France in the round of 32.

On 16 September 2026, Nordfeldt announced his retirement from the national team. He played a total of 23 matches for Sweden between 2011 and 2026.

== Career statistics ==
=== Club ===
As of match played 8 November 2026

Appearances and goals by club, season and competition
Club	Season	League			Cup		League Cup		Other		Total	
Club	Season	Division	Apps	Goals	Apps	Goals	Apps	Goals	Apps	Goals	Apps	Goals
IF Brommapojkarna	2008	Superettan	29	0	0	0	—		—		29	0
IF Brommapojkarna	2009	Allsvenskan	21	0	0	0	—		—		21	0
IF Brommapojkarna	2010	Allsvenskan	25	0	2	0	—		—		27	0
IF Brommapojkarna	2011	Superettan	28	0	0	0	—		—		28	0
IF Brommapojkarna	Total		103	0	2	0	—		—		105	0
SC Heerenveen	2011–12	Eredivisie	6	0	0	0	—		—		6	0
SC Heerenveen	2012–13	Eredivisie	33	0	3	0	—		4	0	40	0
SC Heerenveen	2013–14	Eredivisie	35	0	3	0	—		—		38	0
SC Heerenveen	2014–15	Eredivisie	38	0	1	0	—		—		39	0
SC Heerenveen	Total		112	0	7	0	—		4	0	123	0
Swansea City	2015–16	Premier League	1	0	1	0	2	0	—		4	0
Swansea City	2016–17	Premier League	1	0	1	0	2	0	—		4	0
Swansea City	2017–18	Premier League	0	0	7	0	3	0	—		10	0
Swansea City	2018–19	Championship	22	0	2	0	1	0	—		25	0
Swansea City	2019–20	Championship	0	0	1	0	3	0	—		4	0
Swansea City	Total		24	0	12	0	11	0	—		47	0
Gençlerbirliği	2019–20	Süper Lig	14	0	—		—		—		14	0
Gençlerbirliği	2020–21	Süper Lig	36	0	0	0	—		—		36	0
Gençlerbirliği	Total		50	0	0	0	—		—		50	0
AIK	2021	Allsvenskan	14	0	1	0	—		—		15	0
AIK	2022	Allsvenskan	28	0	4	0	—		6	0	38	0
AIK	2023	Allsvenskan	30	0	4	0	—		—		34	0
AIK	2024	Allsvenskan	28	0	5	0	—		—		33	0
AIK	2025	Allsvenskan	28	0	3	0	—		4	0	35	0
AIK	2026	Allsvenskan	26	0	4	0	—		—		30	0
AIK	Total		154	0	21	0	—		10	0	185	0
Career total			443	0	42	0	11	0	14	0	510	0

^a Appearances in the EFL Trophy.

=== International ===
Appearances and goals by national team and year
National team	Year	Apps	Goals
Sweden
Sweden	2011	1	0
Sweden	2012	0	0
Sweden	2013	1	0
Sweden	2014	2	0
Sweden	2015	1	0
Sweden	2016	1	0
Sweden	2017	1	0
Sweden	2018	3	0
Sweden	2019	1	0
Sweden	2020	1	0
Sweden	2021	3	0
Sweden	2022	1	0
Sweden	2023	2	0
Sweden	2024	0	0
Sweden	2025	0	0
Sweden	2026	5	0
Total		23	0
