= Joe Mendes =

Swedish footballer (born 2002)

- Mendes with Sweden U21 in 2023

Personal information
- Full name: Josafat Wooding Mendes
- Date of birth: 31 December 2002 (age 23)
- Place of birth: Stockholm, Sweden
- Height: 1.77 m (5 ft 10 in)
- Position: Right-back

Team information
- Current team: Samsunspor
- Number: 2

Youth career
- 2007–2013: Väsby United
- 2014–2020: AIK

Senior career*
Years	Team	Apps	(Gls)
2021	Hammarby IF	0	(0)
2021	→ Hammarby TFF	26	(4)
2022–2023	AIK	24	(0)
2023–2025	Braga	25	(1)
2024–2025	→ Basel (loan)	29	(1)
2025–	Samsunspor	29	(1)

International career^{‡}
2018	Sweden U17	2	(0)
2022–2024	Sweden U21	16	(0)
2023	Sweden	1	(0)
- * Club domestic league appearances and goals as of 22 August 2026 ‡ National team caps and goals as of 16:47, 16 October 2024 (UTC)

Josafat Wooding "Joe" Mendes (born 31 December 2002) is a Swedish professional footballer who plays as a right-back for Süper Lig club Samsunspor.

== Early life ==
Born and raised in Stockholm, Mendes started to play football as a youngster for local club AFC United, before moving to AIK at age 12. In 2020, he appeared in several friendlies for the club's first team, but did not feature in any competitive games.

== Club career ==
=== Hammarby IF ===
In 2021, Mendes joined Hammarby Talang FF in Ettan, Sweden's third division. During the first half of the season, he scored once in 12 league appearances, while also providing six assists.

On 19 July 2021, Mendes was promoted to their parent club Hammarby IF in Allsvenskan, the domestic first tier, signing a two-year deal. He made his competitive debut only days later, on 22 July, coming on as a substitute in a 3–1 home win against Maribor in the UEFA Europa Conference League.

=== Return to AIK ===
On 21 December 2021, it was announced that Mendes returned to his former club AIK, in an undisclosed deal between the two rival clubs. He signed a four-year contract with the Allsvenskan club, effective in January 2022.

=== Braga ===
On 28 January 2023, Portuguese side Braga announced the signing of Mendes on a five-and-a-half-year contract.

==== Loan to Basel ====
On 2 September 2024, Mendes joined Swiss club Basel on a season-long loan with an option to buy.

=== Samsunspor ===
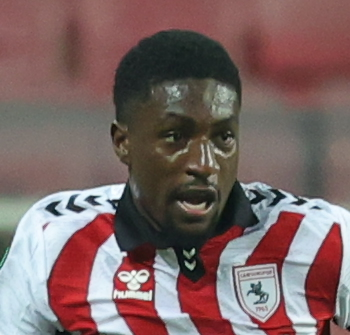
Mendes with Samsunspor in 2025

On 10 July 2025, Mendes signed a five-year contract with Süper Lig club Samsunspor for a fee of €1.2 million, which could rise to €1.5 million with add-ons.

== International career ==
Mendes with Sweden U21 in 2023

In 2018, Mendes won two caps for the Swedish U17 national team, playing in two friendlies against Belgium and Czech Republic. He made his full international debut for Sweden on 12 January 2023 in a friendly 2–1 win against Iceland.

== Personal life ==
Born in Sweden, Mendes is of DR Congolese and Angolan descent. He is the cousin of the Swedish footballer Jardell Kanga.

== Career statistics ==
=== Club ===
As of match played 25 August 2024

Appearances and goals by club, season and competition
Club	Season	League			National cup (Note: Includes Svenska Cupen, Taça de Portugal)		League cup (Note: Includes Taça da Liga)		Europe		Total	
Club	Season	Division	Apps	Goals	Apps	Goals	Apps	Goals	Apps	Goals	Apps	Goals
Hammarby Talang FF	2021	Ettan	26	4	0	0	—		—		26	4
Hammarby IF	2021	Allsvenskan	0	0	1	0	—		1 (Note: Appearance(s) in UEFA Europa Conference League)	0	2	0
AIK	2022	Allsvenskan	24	0	4	0	—		0	0	28	0
AIK	2023	Allsvenskan	0	0	1	0	—		6	1	8	1
AIK	Total		24	0	5	0	—		6	1	36	1
Braga	2022–23	Primeira Liga	4	1	1	0	0	0	1	0	6	1
Braga	2023–24	Primeira Liga	17	0	0	0	2	0	8 (Note: Seven appearances in UEFA Champions League, one appearance in UEFA Europa League)	0	27	0
Braga	2024–25	Primeira Liga	3	0	0	0	0	0	1 (Note: Appearance(s) in UEFA Europa League)	0	4	0
Braga	Total		24	1	1	0	2	0	10	0	37	1
Career total			74	6	7	0	2	0	17	1	101	7

=== International ===
Appearances and goals by national team and year
National team	Year	Apps	Goals
Sweden	2023	1	0
Total		1	0

== Honours ==
Braga

- Taça da Liga: 2023–24

Basel

- Swiss Super League: 2024–25
- Swiss Cup: 2024–25
