= Yasin Ayari =

Swedish footballer (born 2003)

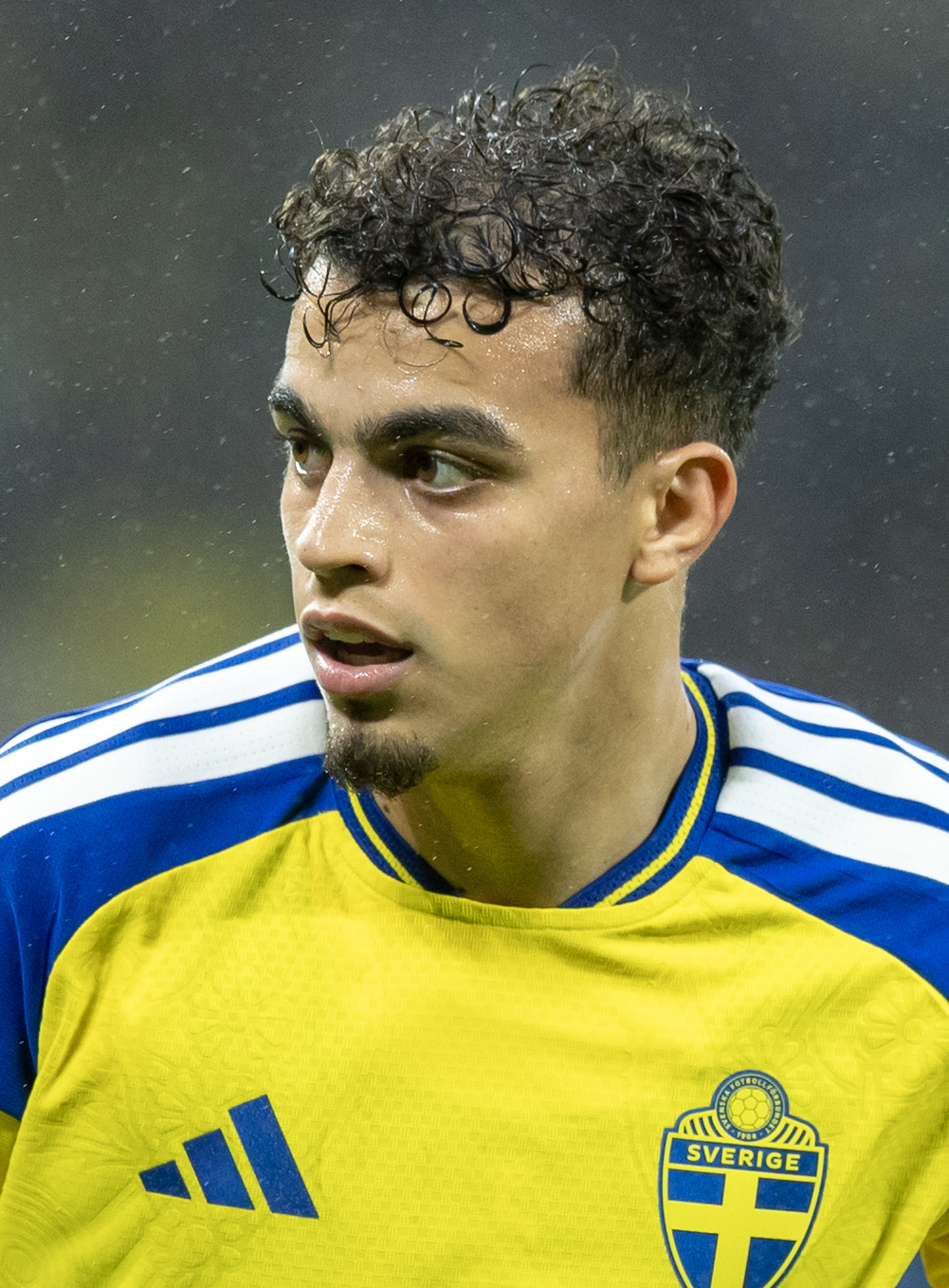
- Ayari with Sweden in 2026

Personal information
- Full name: Yasin Abbas Ayari
- Date of birth: 6 October 2003 (age 23)
- Place of birth: Solna, Sweden
- Height: 1.72 m (5 ft 8 in)
- Position: Midfielder

Team information
- Current team: Brighton & Hove Albion
- Number: 26

Youth career
- 2010–2012: Råsunda
- 2012–2020: AIK

Senior career*
Years	Team	Apps	(Gls)
2020–2023	AIK	37	(4)
2023–	Brighton & Hove Albion	75	(8)
2023–2024	→ Coventry City (loan)	13	(1)
2024	→ Blackburn Rovers (loan)	10	(0)

International career^{‡}
2019	Sweden U17	4	(1)
2021–2022	Sweden U19	10	(1)
2022–2024	Sweden U21	12	(2)
2023–	Sweden	29	(6)
- * Club domestic league appearances and goals as of 8 November 2026 ‡ National team caps and goals as of 23:51, 17 November 2026 (UTC)

Yasin (Note: Swedish pronunciation: [ˈjasːɪn]; French pronunciation: [jasin], according to his Tunisian father.) Ayari (Arabic: ياسين عباس عياري; born 6 October 2003) is a Swedish professional footballer who plays as a midfielder for Premier League club Brighton & Hove Albion and the Sweden national team.

== Club career ==
Ayari began playing football with the youth academy of Råsunda at the age of 6, before moving to AIK around the age of 8.

=== AIK ===
Ayari made his professional debut with AIK in a 2–2 Allsvenskan tie with Elfsborg on 6 December 2020. On 22 October 2021, he signed his first professional contract with AIK until 31 December 2025.

=== Brighton and Hove Albion ===
On 30 January 2023, Ayari signed a contract with Brighton & Hove Albion until June 2027.

Ayari made his Albion debut on 19 March, coming on as a 78th minute substitute replacing Alexis Mac Allister in the 5–0 FA Cup quarter-final win over League Two side Grimsby Town. He made his first Premier League start on 28 May, in his third league appearance, where he was substituted at half time of the 2–1 away defeat at Aston Villa in the last game of the season.

On 26 April 2025, Ayari scored his first goal for Brighton in a 3–2 victory over West Ham United at Falmer Stadium.

==== Coventry City (loan) ====
On 21 August 2023, Ayari joined EFL Championship club Coventry City on loan.

==== Blackburn Rovers (loan) ====
On 5 January 2024, Ayari joined fellow EFL Championship club Blackburn Rovers on a loan deal until the end of the 2023–24 season.

== International career ==
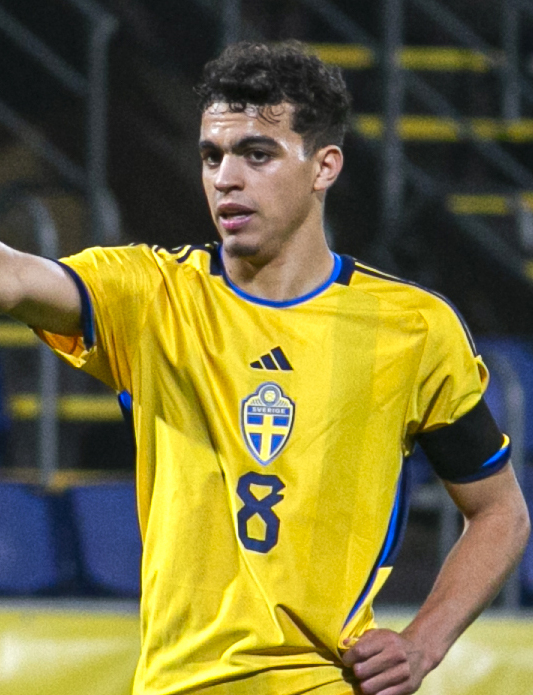
Ayari playing for Sweden U21 in 2023

Born in Sweden to parents from Tunisia and Morocco, Ayari was a youth international for Sweden. Ayari made his full international debut for Sweden in a friendly game against Finland on 10 January 2023.

On 12 May 2026, Ayari was named in the Sweden squad for the 2026 FIFA World Cup. On 14 June 2026, he scored two goals in Sweden's opening match against his paternal country, Tunisia, as Sweden beat Tunisia by 5–1.

== Personal life ==
Ayari was born in Solna, Sweden, to a Tunisian father and a Moroccan mother. His younger brother, Taha, is also a professional footballer. He is engaged to Sandra Kulusevska, sister of Tottenham and fellow Swedish footballer Dejan Kulusevski and have a daughter.

== Career statistics ==
=== Club ===
As of match played 8 November 2026

Appearances and goals by club, season and competition
Club	Season	League			National cup (Note: Includes Svenska Cupen, FA Cup)		League cup (Note: Includes EFL Cup)		Europe		Total	
Club	Season	Division	Apps	Goals	Apps	Goals	Apps	Goals	Apps	Goals	Apps	Goals
AIK	2020	Allsvenskan	1	0	1	0	—		—		2	0
AIK	2021	Allsvenskan	12	0	5	1	—		—		17	1
AIK	2022	Allsvenskan	24	4	0	0	—		5 (Note: Appearances in UEFA (Europa) Conference League)	1	29	5
AIK	Total		37	4	6	1	—		5	1	48	6
Brighton & Hove Albion	2022–23	Premier League	3	0	1	0	—		—		4	0
Brighton & Hove Albion	2024–25	Premier League	34	2	3	0	2	0	—		39	2
Brighton & Hove Albion	2025–26	Premier League	29	3	1	0	2	1	—		32	4
Brighton & Hove Albion	2026–27	Premier League	9	3	0	0	2	0	5	0	16	3
Brighton & Hove Albion	Total		75	8	5	0	6	1	5	0	91	9
Coventry City (loan)	2023–24	Championship	13	1	—		—		—		13	1
Blackburn Rovers (loan)	2023–24	Championship	10	0	3	0	—		—		13	0
Career total			134	13	14	1	6	1	10	1	164	16

=== International ===
As of match played 17 November 2026

Appearances and goals by national team and year
National team	Year	Apps	Goals
Sweden	2023	2	0
Sweden	2024	6	1
Sweden	2025	9	2
Sweden	2026	12	3
Total		29	6

Scores and results list Sweden's goal tally first, score column indicates score after each Ayari goal.

List of international goals scored by Yasin Ayari
No.	Date	Venue	Cap	Opponent	Score	Result	Competition	Ref.
1	11 October 2024	Tehelné pole, Bratislava, Slovakia	5	Slovakia	1–0	2–2	2024–25 UEFA Nations League C	
2	6 June 2025	Puskás Aréna, Budapest, Hungary	11	Hungary	2–0	2–0	Friendly	
3	5 September 2025	Stožice Stadium, Ljubljana, Slovenia	13	Slovenia	2–1	2–2	2026 FIFA World Cup qualification	
4	14 June 2026	Estadio BBVA, Guadalupe, Mexico	22	Tunisia	1–0	5–1	2026 FIFA World Cup	
5	14 June 2026	Estadio BBVA, Guadalupe, Mexico	22	Tunisia	5–1	5–1	2026 FIFA World Cup	
6	28 September 2026	Strawberry Arena, Solna, Sweden	27	Poland	2–1	3–1	2026–27 UEFA Nations League B	

== Honours ==
Individual

- Swedish Midfielder of the Year: 2025
