= Mikael Lustig =

Swedish footballer

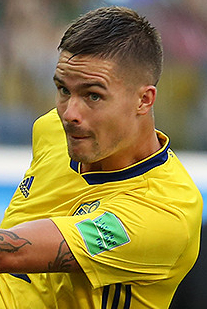
- Lustig playing for Sweden at the 2018 FIFA World Cup

Personal information
- Full name: Carl Mikael Lustig
- Date of birth: 13 December 1986 (age 39)
- Place of birth: Umeå, Sweden
- Height: 1.89 m (6 ft 2 in)
- Position: Right-back

Youth career
- Sandåkerns SK

Senior career*
Years	Team	Apps	(Gls)
2004–2005	Umeå FC	33	(1)
2005–2008	GIF Sundsvall	81	(8)
2008–2011	Rosenborg BK	95	(14)
2012–2019	Celtic	160	(13)
2019–2020	Gent	16	(0)
2020–2022	AIK	67	(4)
Total		452	(40)

International career
2004	Sweden U19	1	(0)
2006–2009	Sweden U21	21	(1)
2008–2021	Sweden	94	(6)
- * Club domestic league appearances and goals

Carl Mikael Lustig (Swedish pronunciation: [ˈmîːkaɛl ˈlɵ̂sːtɪɡ]; born 13 December 1986) is a Swedish former professional footballer who played as a defender. Mainly a right-back, he could also play as a centre-back.

Beginning his career with Umeå FC in 2004, he went on to play for fellow Swedish clubs, including GIF Sundsvall and Rosenborg BK in Norway, before moving to then-Scottish Premier League side Celtic in 2012. From there, he won a total of sixteen domestic titles with the club, before departing in 2019, subsequently moving to Gent. He returned to Sweden with AIK a season later, and retired from football in October 2022, aged 35 years.

A full international for Sweden between 2008 and 2021, Lustig won 94 caps for his country and represented Sweden at three UEFA European Championships, including the 2012, 2016, and 2020 editions, as well as the 2018 FIFA World Cup hosted in Russia.

== Club career ==
=== Early career ===
Lustig began his career with Sandåkerns SK. He then moved to Umeå FC, where he played for two years.

=== GIF Sundsvall ===
Lustig moved to Allsvenskan club GIF Sundsvall for the 2005 season, scoring twice in eight games. GIF Sundsvall were relegated the following season to the Superettan. They were in that division for the next two years, with Lustig playing in 57 of their 60 games. For the 2008 season the team was back in the Allsvenskan and Lustig continued to be a regular in the team, playing in all 11 league games before the Euro break. During the summer he moved to the Norwegian club Rosenborg BK.

=== Rosenborg ===
After four seasons with Rosenborg, Lustig left the club in November 2011. He had attracted interest from other European clubs, such as Scottish Premier League team Celtic, English Premier League club Fulham and La Liga side Espanyol.

=== Celtic ===
On 23 November 2011, Celtic announced that they had signed Lustig on a pre-contract deal. He officially joined the club on 1 January 2012. He made his debut for Celtic on 3 March, in a 1–1 draw with Aberdeen. He scored his first goal for the Hoops in a 2–2 home draw against Hibernian on 1 September 2012. He was also initially credited with Celtic's second goal that day, although it was later given as an own goal. On 17 July 2013, Lustig opened the scoring in Celtic's 3–0 away victory in the second round of qualifying against Cliftonville in the Champions League.

On 6 February 2017, Lustig performed a classic rabona in an unbroken 25-pass move involving all 11 Celtic players, which resulted moments later in a goal for team-mate Moussa Dembélé, sealing his hat-trick and a 5–2 win over home team St. Johnstone. The goal was shortlisted for FIFA's prestigious Puskas Award.

On 28 October 2018, Lustig led the Hoops out to victory in what was his 250th game for the club as they defeated Hearts 3–0 in the League Cup semi-final at Murrayfield.

On 4 May 2019, Lustig nodded home a diving header against Aberdeen, sparking a 3–0 victory for the Celts which secured all three points and the club's eighth consecutive league title. On 19 June, Lustig announced he would leave Celtic after seven-and-a-half years which saw him lift eight titles in a row with the Hoops.

=== Gent ===
On 21 June 2019, Lustig signed a three-year contract with Belgian side Gent until 2022.

=== AIK ===
On 25 August 2020, Lustig returned to Sweden, signing for AIK on a free deal, a club which he did a trial for in 2004. He made his debut on 30 August, playing 29 minutes in a 1–0 loss at home to BK Häcken. He scored his first goal for the club on 20 September 2020 in the Stockholm derby against Hammarby IF, which AIK won 3–0. In the last game of the 2020 Allsvenskan season on 6 December, Lustig scored and assisted when AIK drew 2–2 against IF Elfsborg.

On 13 October 2022, Lustig announced his retirement from professional football aged 35.

== International career ==
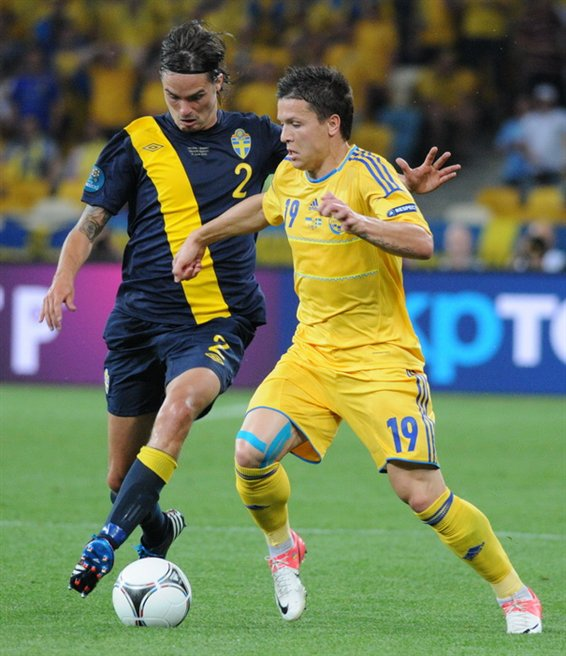
Lustig (left) challenging Ukraine's Yevhen Konoplyanka during UEFA Euro 2012

Lustig played for Sweden's under-18 team. During the 2006 season, Lustig made his national team debut in under-21 team playing in the 2009 European Under-21 Championship. He had been made vice-captain of the team. In total Lustig made 21 appearances for Sweden under-21s. Lustig made his full debut for the Sweden national team on 19 January 2008 in a 2–0 loss against the USA in January 2008. His first goal came on 29 March 2011 in a European Championship qualifier with Moldova, which Sweden won 2–1.

Lustig won his 50th cap for Sweden on 29 March 2016, a 1–1 draw with the Czech Republic. In May, he was included in Erik Hamrén's 23-man squad for UEFA Euro 2016.

In May 2018, Lustig was named in Sweden's 23-man squad for the 2018 FIFA World Cup in Russia. At the tournament, Lustig started in 4 games for Sweden as they were eliminated by England in a 2–0 loss in the quarterfinals, a match in which he did not play.

In May 2021, Lustig was included in the 26-man Sweden squad for the postponed UEFA Euro 2020, where he played all their matches at right-back, as Sweden would be eliminated in the round-of-16 by Ukraine.

On 13 July 2021, Lustig announced his retirement from international football.

== Career statistics ==
=== Club ===
Appearances and goals by club, season and competition
Club	Season	League			National cup (Note: Includes Svenska Cupen, Norwegian Football Cup, Scottish Cup)		League cup		Europe		Total	
Club	Season	Division	Apps	Goals	Apps	Goals	Apps	Goals	Apps	Goals	Apps	Goals
GIF Sundsvall	2005	Allsvenskan	8	2	0	0	–		–		8	2
GIF Sundsvall	2006	Superettan	28	3	2	1	–		–		30	4
GIF Sundsvall	2007	Superettan	29	2	2	1	–		–		31	3
GIF Sundsvall	2008	Allsvenskan	16	1	1	0	–		–		17	1
GIF Sundsvall	Total		81	8	5	2	–		–		86	10
Rosenborg	2008	Tippeligaen	11	1	0	0	–		8	0	19	1
Rosenborg	2009	Tippeligaen	25	4	3	0	–		3	1	31	5
Rosenborg	2010	Tippeligaen	29	4	5	2	–		12	1	46	7
Rosenborg	2011	Tippeligaen	30	5	4	2	–		6	1	40	8
Rosenborg	Total		95	14	12	4	–		29	3	136	21
Celtic	2011–12	Scottish Premier League	4	0	1	0	0	0	0	0	5	0
Celtic	2012–13	Scottish Premier League	23	3	5	0	2	0	9 (Note: Appearances in UEFA Champions League)	0	39	3
Celtic	2013–14	Scottish Premiership	16	0	1	1	1	0	12	1	30	2
Celtic	2014–15	Scottish Premiership	5	2	1	0	2	0	8	0	16	2
Celtic	2015–16	Scottish Premiership	30	4	3	0	2	0	11	1	46	5
Celtic	2016–17	Scottish Premiership	29	1	4	2	4	0	11	1	48	4
Celtic	2017–18	Scottish Premiership	26	1	2	0	3	2	14	0	45	3
Celtic	2018–19	Scottish Premiership	27	2	3	0	3	0	11	0	44	2
Celtic	Total		160	13	20	3	17	2	76	3	273	21
Gent	2019–20	Belgian First Division A	16	0	1	0	–		13	0	30	0
AIK	2020	Allsvenskan	13	2	2	0	–		–		15	2
AIK	2021	Allsvenskan	27	0	3	0	–		–		30	0
AIK	2022	Allsvenskan	27	2	1	0	–		4	0	32	2
AIK	Total		67	4	6	0	0	0	4	0	77	4
Career total			398	34	41	9	17	2	109	6	579	56

=== International ===
Appearances and goals by national team and year
National team	Year	Apps	Goals
Sweden	2008	1	0
Sweden	2009	1	0
Sweden	2010	10	0
Sweden	2011	11	1
Sweden	2012	8	1
Sweden	2013	10	0
Sweden	2014	3	0
Sweden	2015	4	0
Sweden	2016	7	2
Sweden	2017	8	2
Sweden	2018	11	0
Sweden	2019	8	0
Sweden	2020	5	0
Sweden	2021	7	0
Total		94	6

Scores and results list Sweden's goal tally first.

No.	Date	Venue	Opponent	Score	Result	Competition
1.	29 March 2011	Råsunda Stadium, Solna, Sweden	Moldova	1–0	2–1	UEFA Euro 2012 qualifying
2.	16 October 2012	Olympiastadion, Berlin, Germany	Germany	2–4	4–4	2014 FIFA World Cup qualification
3.	5 June 2016	Friends Arena, Solna, Sweden	Wales	2–0	3–0	Friendly
4.	7 October 2016	Stade Josy Barthel, Luxembourg City, Luxembourg	Luxembourg	1–0	1–0	2018 FIFA World Cup qualification
5.	31 August 2017	Vasil Levski National Stadium, Sofia, Bulgaria	Bulgaria	1–1	2–3	2018 FIFA World Cup qualification
6.	7 October 2017	Friends Arena, Solna, Sweden	Luxembourg	5–0	8–0	2018 FIFA World Cup qualification

== Honours ==
Rosenborg

- Tippeligaen: 2009, 2010
- Superfinalen: 2010

Celtic

- Scottish Premiership (8): 2011–12, 2012–13, 2013–14, 2014–15, 2015–16, 2016–17, 2017–18, 2018–19
- Scottish Cup (4): 2012–13, 2016–17, 2017–18, 2018–19
- Scottish League Cup (4): 2014–15, 2016–17, 2017–18, 2018–19

Sweden U21

- UEFA European Under-21 Championship bronze: 2009

Individual

- PFA Scotland Team of the Year (Premiership): 2016–17
