= Erick Otieno =

Kenyan footballer

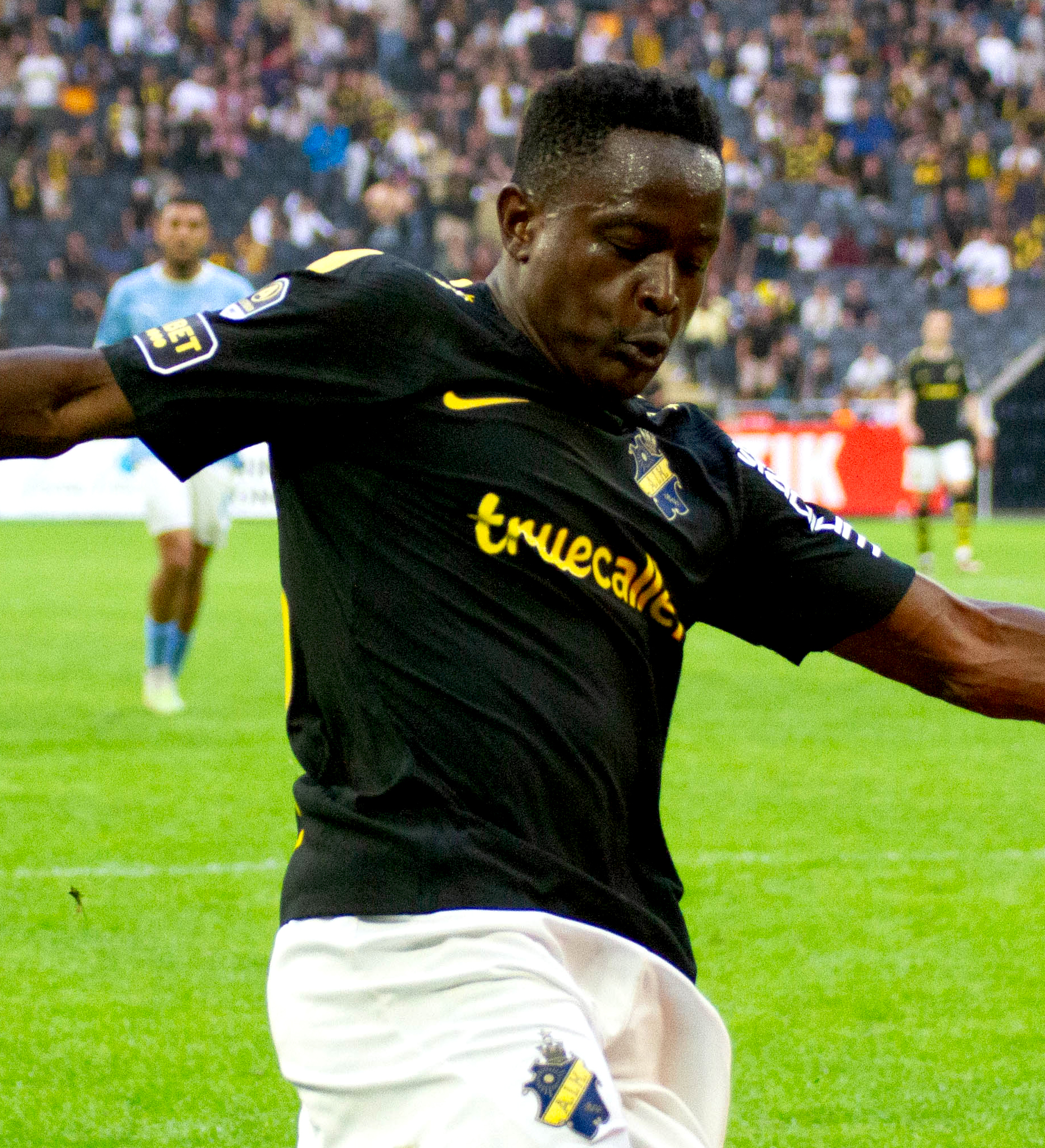
- Otieno with AIK in 2023

Personal information
- Full name: Erick Ouma Otieno
- Date of birth: 27 September 1996 (age 30)
- Place of birth: Awasi, Kenya
- Height: 1.70 m (5 ft 7 in)
- Position: Left-back

Team information
- Current team: Raków Częstochowa
- Number: 26

Senior career*
Years	Team	Apps	(Gls)
2016	Gor Mahia	22	(0)
2017	Kolkheti Poti	19	(0)
2018	KS Kastrioti	0	(0)
2018–2019	Vasalund	22	(2)
2020–2023	AIK	85	(4)
2024–	Raków Częstochowa	51	(2)

International career^{‡}
2016–	Kenya	54	(0)
- * Club domestic league appearances and goals as of 08:47, 9 November 2026 (UTC) ‡ National team caps and goals as of 23:28, 17 November 2026 (UTC)

Erick Ouma Otieno (born 27 September 1996) is a Kenyan professional footballer who plays for Ekstraklasa club Raków Częstochowa and the Kenya national team. Mainly a left-back, he can also be deployed in all other positions on the left side.

== Club career ==
Born in Awasi, Kisumu County, Ouma signed a six-month contract with Gor Mahia in January 2016, before renewing it until the end of the year during the summer. Ouma left Gor Mahia at the end of his contract, going on to sign a six-month contract with Georgian club Kolkheti Poti in January 2017. In February 2018 he moved to Albanian club KS Kastrioti, and by September 2018 he was playing for Swedish club Vasalund, for whom he made 22 appearances, scoring 2 goals.

He moved to AIK for the 2020 season.

On 11 January 2024, Otieno signed a three-year contract with defending Ekstraklasa champions Raków Częstochowa.

== International career ==
Ouma made his international debut for Kenya in 2016. He was a squad member at the 2019 Africa Cup of Nations.

== Career statistics ==
=== International ===
As of match played 17 November 2026

Appearances and goals by national team and year
National team	Year	Apps	Goals
Kenya
Kenya	2016	8	0
Kenya	2017	1	0
Kenya	2018	8	0
Kenya	2019	9	0
Kenya	2020	2	0
Kenya	2021	7	0
Kenya	2023	7	0
Kenya	2024	6	0
Kenya	2025	2	0
Kenya	2026	4	0
Total		54	0
