= Anton Liljenbäck =

Swedish footballer

Personal information
- Full name: Anton Per Liljenbäck
- Date of birth: 21 February 1995 (age 31)
- Height: 1.83 m (6 ft 0 in)
- Position: Right midfielder

Team information
- Current team: Rosengård 1917
- Number: 5

Youth career
- Kinna IF
- 2014: BK Häcken

Senior career*
Years	Team	Apps	(Gls)
2010–2011	Skene IF	16	(0)
2012–2013	Kinna IF	34	(4)
2015–2017	Varbergs BoIS	77	(3)
2018	Jönköpings Södra IF	15	(0)
2019–2025	Varbergs BoIS	98	(5)
2026–	Rosengård 1917	3	(0)

Managerial career
- 2025: Varbergs BoIS U-19 (assistant)
- * Club domestic league appearances and goals as of 1 August 2026

Anton Liljenbäck (born 21 February 1995) is a Swedish professional footballer who plays for Rosengård 1917.
