= Taha Ayari =

Swedish footballer (born 2005)

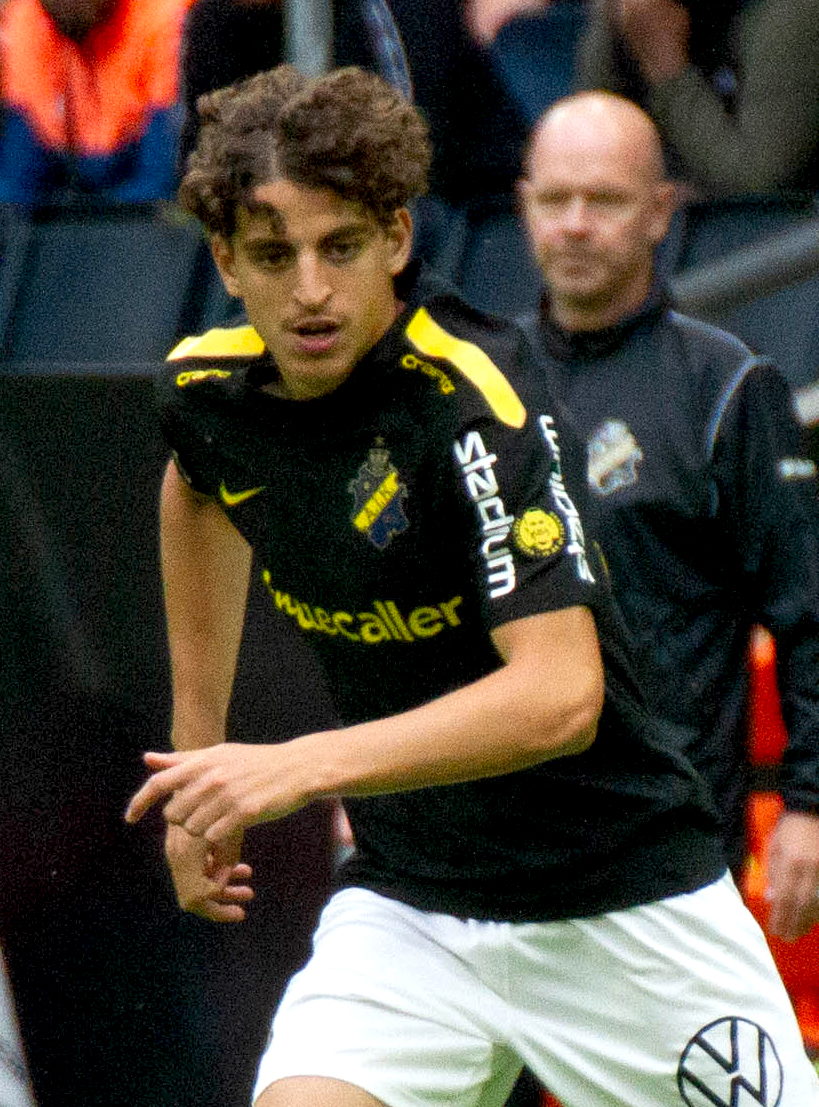
- Ayari in 2023

Personal information
- Date of birth: 10 May 2005 (age 21)
- Place of birth: Solna, Sweden
- Height: 1.77 m (5 ft 10 in)
- Position: Winger

Team information
- Current team: AIK
- Number: 45

Youth career
- 2010–2012: Råsunda IS
- 2012–2022: AIK

Senior career*
Years	Team	Apps	(Gls)
2022–	AIK	66	(1)

International career^{‡}
2021–2022	Sweden U17	14	(3)
2022–2023	Sweden U19	12	(2)
2024–2025	Sweden U21	2	(0)
- * Club domestic league appearances and goals as of 8 July 2026 ‡ National team caps and goals as of 18:18, 19 October 2025 (UTC)

Taha Ayari (Arabic: طه العياري; born 10 May 2005) is a Swedish professional footballer who plays as a winger for Allsvenskan club AIK.

== Club career ==
Born in Solna, Ayari started playing football at Råsunda IS in 2010 (aged five) before joining local side AIK two years later. Having come through the club's youth ranks, he started training with the first team in 2021. In the same year, he was part of the squad that won the under-17 national championship.

In May 2022, Ayari went on trial with Eredivisie club Feyenoord, but eventually decided to stay at AIK, in order to continue his development. After being promoted to the first team on a stable basis under caretaker manager Henok Goitom, he made his professional debut on 31 August of the same year, coming on as a substitute for Benjamin Mbunga Kimpioka at the 57th minute of a 2–4 Svenska Cupen win over Hudiksvalls FF. He then made his Allsvenskan debut on 4 September, replacing his older brother Yasin at the 87th minute of a league match against GIF Sundsvall: a few minutes later, he won a penalty kick for the Gnaget, which was then scored by Sebastian Larsson and led to a 4–0 win for his side.

In October 2022, Ayari signed his first professional contract with AIK, penning a deal lasting until 31 December 2025.

== International career ==
Because of his family's origins, Ayari can choose to represent Sweden, Morocco or Tunisia internationally.

He has played for the Swedish under-17 and under-19 national teams.

In May 2022, he was included in the Swedish squad that took part in the UEFA European Under-17 Championship in Israel, where the Blågult were eliminated in the group stage on head-to-head goal difference.

== Personal life ==
Ayari was born in Sweden to parents from Tunisia and Morocco.

He is the younger brother of fellow footballer Yasin Ayari (b. 2003).
