= Erik Ring (footballer) =

Swedish footballer

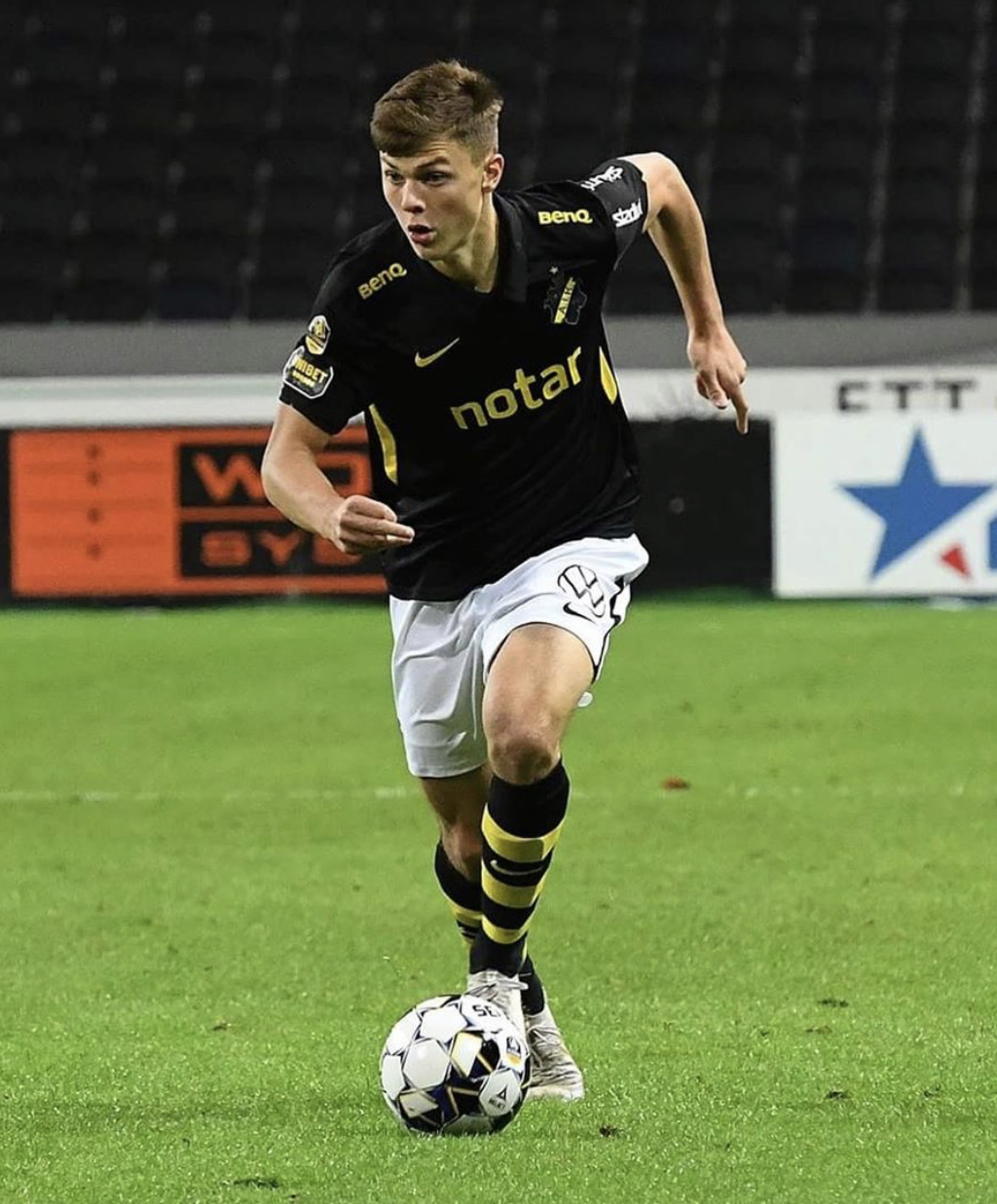
- Ring in 2020

Personal information
- Full name: Erik Karl Hugo Ring
- Date of birth: 24 April 2002 (age 24)
- Place of birth: Södertälje, Sweden
- Height: 1.85 m (6 ft 1 in)
- Position: Left winger

Team information
- Current team: Kilmarnock
- Number: 8

Youth career
- 2008–2011: Huddinge
- 2011–2017: Segeltorp
- 2017–2020: AIK

Senior career*
| Years | Team | Apps | (Gls) |
| 2020–2024 | AIK | 49 | (0) |
| 2023 | → Helsingborgs IF (loan) | 29 | (6) |
| 2024–2026 | Lincoln City | 36 | (3) |
| 2026– | Kilmarnock | 12 | (0) |

International career
| 2021 | Sweden U21 | 2 | (0) |
- * Club domestic league appearances and goals as of 17:08, 21 November 2026 (UTC)

Erik Karl Hugo Ring (born 24 April 2002) is a Swedish professional footballer who plays as a left winger for Scottish Premiership club Kilmarnock.

== Career ==
Ring is a youth product of Huddinge and Segeltorps, before joining the youth academy of AIK in 2017. He signed his first professional contract with AIK on 9 September 2020, keeping him at the club until 31 December 2024. He made his professional debut with the club in a 3–0 Allsvenskan win over Hammarby on 20 September 2020.

On 23 August 2024, Ring joined English club Lincoln City for an undisclosed fee, signing a contract until the summer of 2028. Ring made his debut against Chesterfield in the EFL Trophy starting the game which finished in a 1–0 defeat. He scored his first goal in English football, scoring a late winner against Northampton Town on 29 October 2024.

On 4 July, Ring joined Scottish Premiership club Kilmarnock on a two-year deal for an undisclosed fee.

== International career ==
Ring is a youth international for Sweden, having been called up to represent the Sweden U21 in October 2021.

== Career statistics ==
As of 21 November 2026

| Club | Season | League | | | National Cup | | League Cup | | Other | | Total | |
| Club | Season | Division | Apps | Goals | Apps | Goals | Apps | Goals | Apps | Goals | Apps | Goals |
|---|---|---|---|---|---|---|---|---|---|---|---|---|
| AIK | 2020 | Allsvenskan | 10 | 0 | 1 | 1 | — | | — | | 11 | 1 |
| AIK | 2021 | Allsvenskan | 17 | 0 | 1 | 0 | — | | — | | 18 | 0 |
| AIK | 2022 | Allsvenskan | 17 | 0 | 5 | 1 | — | | 6 (Note: Appearance(s) in UEFA Conference League) | 0 | 28 | 1 |
| AIK | 2023 | Allsvenskan | 0 | 0 | 0 | 0 | — | | — | | 0 | 0 |
| AIK | 2024 | Allsvenskan | 5 | 0 | 2 | 0 | — | | — | | 7 | 0 |
| AIK | Total | | 49 | 0 | 9 | 2 | 0 | 0 | 6 | 0 | 63 | 1 |
| Helsingborgs IF (loan) | 2023 | Superettan | 29 | 6 | 4 | 0 | — | | — | | 33 | 6 |
| Lincoln City | 2024–25 | EFL League One | 24 | 3 | 3 | 1 | — | | 3 (Note: Appearance(s) in EFL Trophy) | 0 | 30 | 4 |
| Lincoln City | 2025–26 | EFL League One | 12 | 0 | 1 | 1 | 2 | 0 | 4 | 1 | 19 | 2 |
| Lincoln City | Total | | 36 | 3 | 4 | 2 | 2 | 0 | 7 | 1 | 49 | 6 |
| Kilmarnock | 2026–27 | Scottish Premiership | 12 | 0 | 0 | 0 | 6 | 0 | — | | 18 | 0 |
| Career total | | | 126 | 9 | 17 | 4 | 8 | 0 | 13 | 1 | 164 | 14 |

== Honours ==
Lincoln City

- EFL League One: 2025–26
