= Jesper Ceesay =

Gambian association footballer

Personal information
- Full name: Jesper Ismaila Ceesay
- Date of birth: 20 October 2001 (age 25)
- Place of birth: Solna, Sweden
- Height: 1.92 m (6 ft 4 in)
- Position: Midfielder

Team information
- Current team: Antalyaspor
- Number: 23

Youth career
- 2006–2007: Hässelby SK
- 2007–2020: Brommapojkarna

Senior career*
| Years | Team | Apps | (Gls) |
| 2020–2021 | Brommapojkarna | 53 | (0) |
| 2022–2023 | AIK | 8 | (0) |
| 2023–2025 | IFK Norrköping | 52 | (1) |
| 2025– | Antalyaspor | 31 | (0) |

International career^{‡}
| 2022 | Gambia U23 | 1 | (0) |
| 2025– | Gambia | 2 | (0) |
- * Club domestic league appearances and goals as of 10 June 2026 ‡ National team caps and goals as of 14 October 2025

Jesper Ismaila Ceesay (born 20 October 2001) is a professional footballer who plays as a midfielder for Turkish Süper Lig club Antalyaspor. Born in Sweden, he is a Gambia international.

== Career ==
Ceesay is a product of the youth academies of Hässelby and Brommapojkarna. In 2020, at the age of 18, he began his senior career with Brommapojkarna in the Ettan tournament. On 9 April 2021, he extended his contract with the club until 2023. In his sophomore season in 2021, he became a starter at the club and helped them win the 2021 Ettan, and was named the league's talent of the season. On 21 December 2021, he transferred to the Allsvenskan club AIK until 31 December 2025. After only a year in AIK, he transferred to IFK Norrköping, signing a three-year contract.

== International career ==
Ceesay played for the Gambia U23s for 2023 U-20 Africa Cup of Nations qualification matches in September 2022.

== Personal life ==
Born in Sweden, Ceesay is of Gambian descent through his father Ceesay who was a former footballer. His brother Joseph Ceesay is also a professional footballer.

== Honours ==
Brommapojkarna

- Ettan: 2021
