= Awasi =

Town in Kenya

Awasi is a small town in Kisumu County, Kenya. It is the headquarters of Nyando Sub-county in Kisumu County. The town is also commonly known by the name "Ladhri", a Dholuo word meaning 'someone who always lacks' or 'someone begging for help/ looking to others for help'.

Awasi Town is strategically located in the border between Nyanza and Rift Valley provinces, hence the name Awasi Border. The town has recently grown substantially due to trade between the Luo and Kalenjin communities among other Kenyan tribes.

Investors have also been able to establish a presence in the town with various companies establishing a strong presence in the town. companies like Gogni Rajope, Steel Mills, among others have made entry in the town. The member of county assembly Awasi/Onjiko is Gilbert Njoga .
