= Tom Strannegård =

Swedish footballer

Personal information
- Full name: Tom Henning Strannegård
- Date of birth: 29 April 2002 (age 24)
- Place of birth: Danderyd, Sweden
- Position: Midfielder

Team information
- Current team: Thun
- Number: 18

Youth career
- 2008–2019: Stocksund
- 2017–2019: AIK

Senior career*
Years	Team	Apps	(Gls)
2019–2022	AIK	29	(1)
2021	→ Vasalund (loan)	8	(0)
2022	→ Start (loan)	13	(2)
2022–2026	Start	100	(11)
2026–	Thun	6	(0)

International career
2017	Sweden U17	4	(0)
2021	Sweden U19	4	(0)
- * Club domestic league appearances and goals as of 28 September 2026

Tom Henning Strannegård (born 29 April 2002) is a Swedish professional footballer who plays as a midfielder for Swiss Super League club Thun.

== Career statistics ==
As of 30 November 2020

Appearances and goals by club, season and competition
Club	Season	League			Svenska Cupen		Continental		Other		Total	
Club	Season	Division	Apps	Goals	Apps	Goals	Apps	Goals	Apps	Goals	Apps	Goals
AIK	2019	Allsvenskan	0	0	1	1	0	0	0	0	1	1
AIK	2020	Allsvenskan	12	0	1	0	0	0	0	0	13	0
Career total			12	0	2	1	0	0	0	0	14	1

== Honours ==
Individual

- Norwegian First Division Young Player of the Month: April 2023
