= Jetmir Haliti =

Kosovar-Swedish footballer

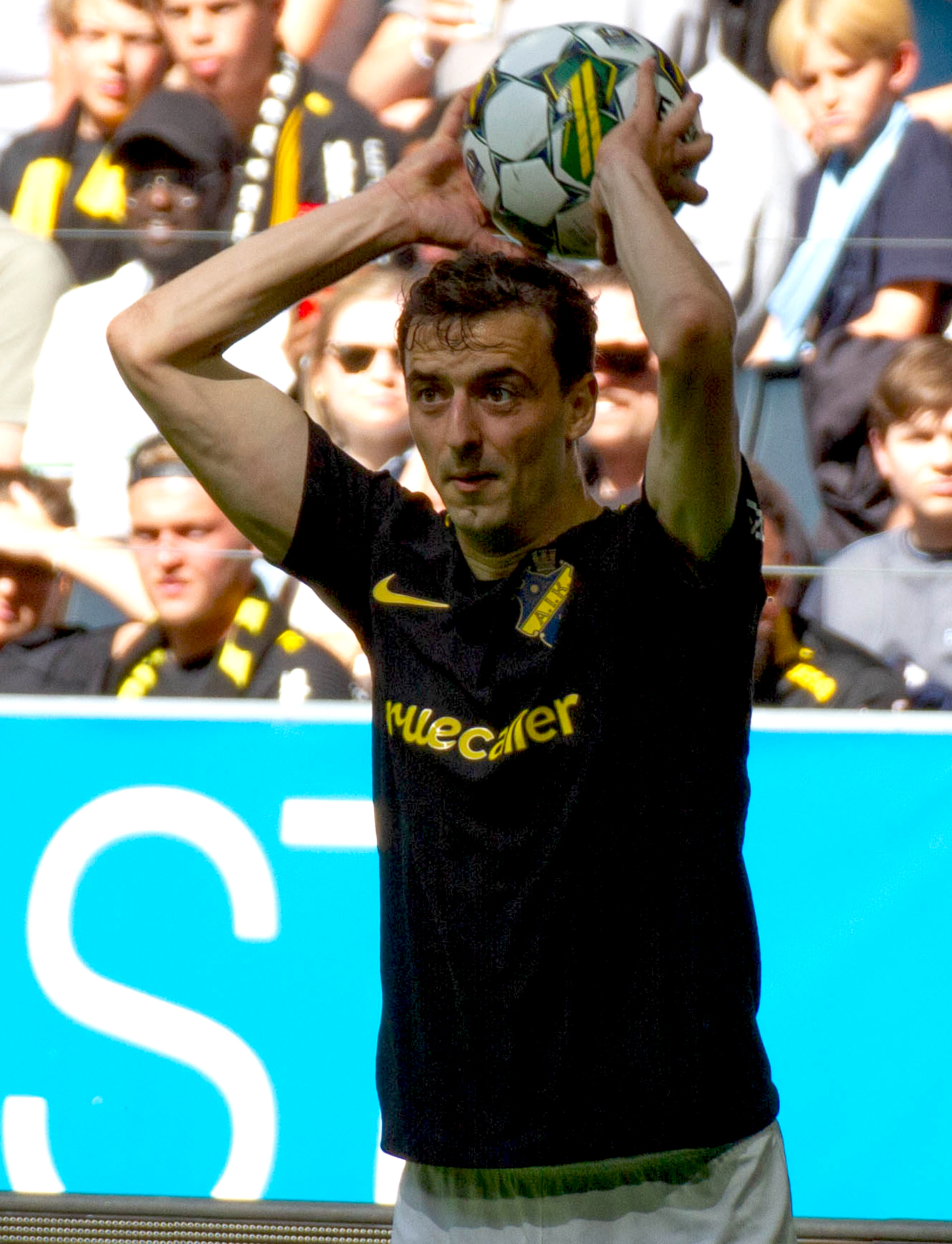
- Haliti with AIK in 2023

Personal information
- Date of birth: 14 September 1996 (age 30)
- Place of birth: Växjö, Sweden
- Height: 1.88 m (6 ft 2 in)
- Position: Centre-back

Team information
- Current team: Örebro SK
- Number: 19

Youth career
- 2004–2013: Malmö ABI

Senior career*
| Years | Team | Apps | (Gls) |
| 2013–2015 | BK Olympic | 49 | (5) |
| 2016 | Prespa Birlik | 0 | (0) |
| 2016–2018 | FC Rosengård | 26 | (2) |
| 2018 | → Landskrona BoIS (loan) | 12 | (0) |
| 2019–2021 | Jönköpings Södra IF | 53 | (1) |
| 2021–2023 | AIK | 25 | (0) |
| 2022 | → Mjällby AIF (loan) | 23 | (0) |
| 2023–2025 | Jagiellonia Białystok | 12 | (0) |
| 2024 | Jagiellonia Białystok II | 1 | (0) |
| 2025–2026 | Mladá Boleslav | 7 | (0) |
| 2026– | Örebro SK | 10 | (0) |

International career
| 2022 | Kosovo | 1 | (0) |
- * Club domestic league appearances and goals as of 12 November 2026

Jetmir Haliti (born 14 September 1996) is a professional footballer who plays as a centre-back for Superettan club Örebro SK. Born in Sweden, he played for the Kosovo national team.

== Club career ==
=== Early career and FC Rosengård ===
Haliti at the age of eight started playing football in Malmö ABI, where after nine years it was transferred to BK Olympic, he besides being was part of BK Olympic, Haliti was part of Prespa Birlik for a short time until 19 March 2016, where he joined with Swedish Division 1 side FC Rosengård.

==== Loan at Landskrona BoIS ====
On 27 March 2018, Haliti joined Superettan side Landskrona BoIS, on a season-long loan. On 16 June 2018, he made his debut in a 1–2 away defeat against IK Brage after coming on as a substitute in the 62nd minute in place of Bahrudin Atajić.

=== Jönköpings Södra IF ===
On 18 December 2018, Haliti signed a three-year contract with Superettan club Jönköpings Södra IF and this transfer would become legally effective in January 2019. On 2 April 2019, he made his debut in a 0–1 away defeat against Halmstad after being named in the starting line-up.

=== AIK ===
On 21 January 2021, Haliti signed a two-year contract with Allsvenskan club AIK and received squad number 6. AIK reportedly paid a 1,2 million Swedish krona transfer fee. On 10 May 2021, he made his debut in a 2–0 away defeat against Norrköping after coming on as a substitute at 70th minute in place of Ebenezer Ofori.

==== Loan at Mjällby AIF ====
On 31 March 2022, Haliti joined Allsvenskan side Mjällby AIF, on a season-long loan. Ten days later, he was named as a substitute for the first time, for a league match against Djurgårdens IF.

=== Jagiellonia Białystok ===
On 6 December 2023, Haliti joined Ekstraklasa side Jagiellonia Białystok and this transfer would become legally effective in January 2024. He penned an eighteen-month deal with an extension option for another year and was given squad number 4. He made his debut in a 1–2 home loss against Lech Poznań on 17 February 2024, appearing as a substitute in the 89th minute, replacing Mateusz Skrzypczak. He made his first start a week later, in a 1–1 home draw against Ruch Chorzów.

=== Mlada Boleslav ===
On 3 January 2025, Haliti joined Czech First League side Mlada Boleslav for a reported fee of €100,000.

== International career ==
On 31 May 2021, Haliti received a call-up from Kosovo for the friendly matches against Guinea and Gambia, but due to injury, could not be part of the national team. On 11 November 2022, he received again a call-up from Kosovo for the friendly matches against Armenia and Faroe Islands. His debut with Kosovo came five days later in the friendly match against Armenia after being named in the starting line-up.

== Career statistics ==
=== Club ===
As of match played 10 November 2024

Appearances and goals by club, season and competition
| Club | Season | League | | | National cup (Note: Includes Svenska Cupen, Polish Cup) | | Other | | Total | |
| Club | Season | Division | Apps | Goals | Apps | Goals | Apps | Goals | Apps | Goals |
|---|---|---|---|---|---|---|---|---|---|---|
| BK Olympic | 2013 | Division 3 | 10 | 0 | 0 | 0 | — | | 10 | 0 |
| BK Olympic | 2014 | Division 3 | 19 | 2 | 1 | 0 | — | | 20 | 2 |
| BK Olympic | 2015 | Division 3 | 20 | 3 | 0 | 0 | — | | 20 | 3 |
| BK Olympic | Total | | 49 | 5 | 1 | 0 | — | | 50 | 5 |
| Prespa Birlik | 2016 | Division 1 | 0 | 0 | 0 | 0 | — | | 0 | 0 |
| FC Rosengård | 2016 | Division 2 | 6 | 0 | 0 | 0 | — | | 6 | 0 |
| FC Rosengård | 2017 | Division 1 | 20 | 2 | 1 | 0 | — | | 21 | 2 |
| FC Rosengård | Total | | 26 | 2 | 1 | 0 | — | | 27 | 2 |
| Landskrona BoIS (loan) | 2018 | Superettan | 12 | 0 | 1 | 0 | — | | 13 | 0 |
| Jönköpings Södra IF | 2019 | Superettan | 24 | 0 | 3 | 0 | — | | 27 | 0 |
| Jönköpings Södra IF | 2020 | Superettan | 29 | 1 | 0 | 0 | — | | 29 | 1 |
| Jönköpings Södra IF | Total | | 53 | 1 | 3 | 0 | — | | 56 | 1 |
| AIK | 2021 | Allsvenskan | 4 | 0 | 0 | 0 | — | | 4 | 0 |
| AIK | 2023 | Allsvenskan | 21 | 0 | 4 | 1 | — | | 25 | 1 |
| AIK | Total | | 25 | 0 | 4 | 1 | — | | 29 | 1 |
| Mjällby AIF (loan) | 2022 | Allsvenskan | 23 | 0 | 0 | 0 | — | | 23 | 0 |
| Jagiellonia Białystok | 2023–24 | Ekstraklasa | 6 | 0 | 0 | 0 | — | | 6 | 0 |
| Jagiellonia Białystok | 2024–25 | Ekstraklasa | 6 | 0 | 1 | 0 | 1 (Note: Appearance in UEFA Conference League) | 0 | 8 | 0 |
| Jagiellonia Białystok | Total | | 25 | 0 | 4 | 1 | — | | 29 | 1 |
| Jagiellonia Białystok II | 2023–24 | III liga, group I | 1 | 0 | — | | — | | 1 | 0 |
| Career total | | | 201 | 8 | 11 | 1 | 1 | 0 | 213 | 9 |

== Honours ==
Jagiellonia Białystok

- Ekstraklasa: 2023–24
