= Henry Atola =

Kenyan footballer (born 2001)

Personal information
- Full name: Henry Atola Meja
- Date of birth: 21 December 2001 (age 24)
- Place of birth: Kakamega, Kenya
- Position: Centre-forward

Team information
- Current team: AIK

Senior career*
Years	Team	Apps	(Gls)
2020–2021	Tusker	9	(11)
2022–	AIK	3	(0)
2023	→ Norrby IF (loan)	13	(4)
2024–2025	→ AFC Eskilstuna (loan)	55	(7)

International career^{‡}
2021–	Kenya	5	(0)
- * Club domestic league appearances and goals as of 24 November 2025 ‡ National team caps and goals as of 18 July 2023

Henry Atola Meja (born 21 December 2001) is a Kenyan footballer who plays for AIK, and the Kenyan national team.

== Club career ==
Meja came up through the ranks of Green Commandos SC of the National Super League. With Lihrembe Arsenal FC he won the 2018 and 2019 Cleophas Malala Super Cup, winning the Golden Boot Award in both editions of the tournament. In January 2020 he signed a three-year contract with Tusker F.C. of the Kenya Premier League. He spurned interest from AFC Leopards and Kakamega Homeboyz for the promise of top-flight minutes and so that he could play with his brother Sammy. He scored his first goal for the club on 13 December 2020 against Gor Mahia. He came off the bench to score the game-winning goal of the 2–1 victory. He was named the Premier League and Tusker's Player of the Month for January 2021 after tallying four goals and an assist for the month. In March 2021 it was reported by local media that Meja's progress was being tracked by Zamalek of the Egyptian Premier League and Tanzanian club Simba.

In September 2021 Swedish top-tier club AIK communicated that they had signed Meja on a five-year deal and that he would join the club for the pre-season in January 2022. Meja's official arrival at AIK was announced in January 2022 at the opening of the transfer window. The player's contract was set to run through 1 September 2026.

In January 2023 Meja was loaned out to Norrby IF for the 2023 season.

In March 2024, Meja joined AFC Eskilstuna on loan for the 2024 season. On 27 January 2025, Atola Meja joined AFC Eskilstuna on another loan-deal for the 2025 season.

== International career ==
In October 2020 Meja was named to Kenya's provisional squad for the 2020 CECAFA U-20 Championship. He was called up to the senior national team for the first time in February 2021. He made his senior international debut on 13 March 2021 in a friendly against Sudan. Later that year, he was named to the Kenya U23 team for the 2021 CECAFA U-23 Challenge Cup in Ethiopia.

=== International career statistics ===
As of match played 10 October 2021.

Kenya national team
Year	Apps	Goals
2021	5	0
Total	5	0
