= Samuel Brolin =

Swedish footballer

Personal information
- Full name: Samuel Erik Oskar Brolin
- Date of birth: 29 September 2000 (age 26)
- Place of birth: Lidköping, Sweden
- Height: 2.02 m (6 ft 8 in)
- Position: Goalkeeper

Team information
- Current team: Kalmar FF
- Number: 1

Youth career
- 2005–2015: IFK Stocksund
- 2015–2018: AIK

Senior career*
Years	Team	Apps	(Gls)
2019–2023	AIK	0	(0)
2019	→ Vasalunds IF (loan)	16	(0)
2020	→ Akropolis IF (loan)	30	(0)
2021–2022	→ Mjällby AIF (loan)	39	(0)
2023	→ Horsens (loan)	3	(0)
2024–	Kalmar FF	48	(0)

International career
2016–2017	Sweden U17	7	(0)
2017–2019	Sweden U19	9	(0)
2021–2022	Sweden U21	11	(0)
- * Club domestic league appearances and goals as of 8 July 2026

Samuel Erik Oskar Brolin (born 29 September 2000) is a Swedish footballer who plays as a goalkeeper for Kalmar FF.
