= List of Swedish football transfers winter 2023–24 =

This is a list of Swedish football transfers for the 2023–24 winter transfer window. Only transfers featuring Allsvenskan and Superettan are listed.

== Allsvenskan ==
Note: Flags indicate national team as has been defined under FIFA eligibility rules. Players may hold more than one non-FIFA nationality.

=== Malmö ===
In:

No.	Pos.	Nation	Player
1	GK	BRA	Ricardo Friedrich (from Kalmar)
17	DF	DEN	Jens Stryger Larsen (from (Turkey) Trabzonspor)
20	FW	NOR	Erik Botheim (from (Italy) Salernitana)

Out:

No.	Pos.	Nation	Player
1	GK	SWE	Melker Ellborg (on loan to Trelleborg, previously on loan at Ariana)
3	DF	DEN	Jonas Knudsen (free agent)
7	MF	FRA	Mahamé Siby (on loan to (France) Bastia)
15	DF	SWE	Joseph Ceesay (on loan to Norrköping)
28	MF	SWE	David Edvardsson (reloan to Landskrona)
29	DF	SWE	Noah Eile (to (United States) New York Red Bulls, previously on loan at Mjällby)
30	GK	MLI	Ismael Diawara (to AIK)
35	DF	CMR	Samuel Kotto (on loan to Värnamo, previously on loan at Landskrona)
39	GK	SWE	Viktor Andersson (to Värnamo, previously on loan at Lund)
—	GK	SWE	Mathias Nilsson (on loan to (Finland) Gnistan, previously on loan at Örgryte)
—	DF	SWE	André Alvarez Perez (on loan to (Denmark) AaB, previously on loan at Olympic)
—	MF	SWE	Peter Gwargis (on loan to Örebro, previously on loan at Degerfors)
—	FW	GHA	Malik Abubakari (on loan to (Denmark) Viborg, previously on loan at (Slovakia) Slovan Bratislava)
—	MF	SWE	August Karlin (to (Norway) Lillestrøm, previously on loan at Jönköping)
—	FW	SWE	Emmanuel Igbonekwu (to Rosengård, previously on loan at Olympic)

=== Elfsborg ===
In:

No.	Pos.	Nation	Player
2	DF	GHA	Terry Yegbe (from (Finland) SJK)
9	FW	KOS	Arbër Zeneli (from (Turkey) Adana Demirspor)
11	MF	ISL	Eggert Aron Guðmundsson (from (Iceland) Stjarnan)
19	DF	TUN	Rami Kaib (from Djurgården)
22	FW	KOS	Dion Krasniqi (from Varberg)
30	GK	DEN	Marcus Bundgaard Sørensen (from (Denmark) Vendsyssel)
31	GK	SWE	Isak Pettersson (from (Norway) Stabæk)

Out:

No.	Pos.	Nation	Player
1	GK	SWE	Melker Uppenberg (on loan to Oskarshamn)
5	DF	GAM	Maudo Jarjué (to (Norway) Sandefjord)
11	FW	ISL	Sveinn Aron Guðjohnsen (to (Germany) Hansa Rostock)
12	FW	SWE	Alexander Bernhardsson (to (Germany) Holstein Kiel)
19	FW	DEN	Jeppe Okkels (to (Netherlands) Utrecht)
22	MF	SWE	Kevin Holmén (on loan to Degerfors, previously on loan at Örgryte)
25	FW	SWE	Jack Cooper Love (on loan to GAIS, previously on loan at Halmstad)
26	MF	GHA	Emmanuel Boateng (to (Turkey) Konyaspor)
30	GK	ISL	Hákon Valdimarsson (to (England) Brentford)
31	GK	SWE	Tim Rönning (to Halmstad)
32	DF	SWE	Viktor Widell (to Norrby)

=== Häcken ===
In:

No.	Pos.	Nation	Player
4	DF	NOR	Marius Lode (from (Norway) Bodø/Glimt)
6	DF	SWE	Axel Lindahl (on loan from Kalmar)
11	MF	SWE	Julius Lindberg (from GAIS)
21	DF	SWE	Adam Lundkvist (from (United States) Austin)
22	DF	SRB	Nikola Zecevic (from (Serbia) Voždovac)
23	MF	SWE	Jeremy Agbonifo (from (Portugal) Porto U19)
29	FW	SWE	Zeidane Inoussa (from Brommapojkarna)
32	GK	SWE	Andreas Linde (from (Germany) Greuther Fürth)
33	FW	UGA	John Paul Dembe (from (Uganda) KCCA, previously on loan)

Out:

No.	Pos.	Nation	Player
1	GK	SWE	Johan Brattberg (to Västerås)
4	DF	SYR	Aiham Ousou (loan return to (Czech Republic) Slavia Prague)
9	FW	NOR	Ola Kamara (to (Norway) Vålerenga)
11	MF	SWE	Samuel Gustafson (to (Japan) Urawa Red Diamonds)
15	DF	BIH	Kadir Hodžić (free agent)
21	DF	NOR	Tomas Totland (to (United States) St. Louis City)
22	MF	SWE	Tobias Sana (to Örgryte)
23	FW	SWE	Momodou Sonko (to (Belgium) Gent)
25	DF	SEN	Abdoulaye Faye (on loan to Örgryte)
29	FW	MKD	Filip Trpchevski (on loan to Utsikten)
30	GK	SWE	Sebastian Banozic (on loan to Torslanda)
31	DF	SWE	Charlie Axede (on loan to Torslanda)
33	FW	UGA	John Paul Dembe (on loan to Oddevold)
—	MF	BIH	Semir Bosnić (on loan to Ljungskile, previously on loan at Norrby)

=== Djurgården ===
In:

No.	Pos.	Nation	Player
5	DF	FIN	Miro Tenho (from (Finland) HJK)
8	MF	SWE	Albin Ekdal (from (Italy) Spezia)
10	MF	SWE	Samuel Leach Holm (from Brommapojkarna)
11	FW	TUR	Deniz Hümmet (from Kalmar)
16	FW	NOR	Tobias Gulliksen (from (Norway) Bodø/Glimt)
17	DF	DEN	Peter Therkildsen (from (Norway) Haugesund)
20	FW	NOR	Tokmac Nguen (from (Hungary) Ferencváros)
27	DF	JPN	Keita Kosugi (from (Japan) Shonan Bellmare)
30	GK	SWE	Malkolm Nilsson Säfqvist (from Halmstad)

Out:

No.	Pos.	Nation	Player
4	DF	SWE	Jesper Löfgren (on loan to (Switzerland) Luzern, previously on loan at Brommapojkarna)
5	DF	SWE	Elliot Käck (retired)
13	MF	SWE	Hampus Finndell (on loan to (Germany) Eintracht Braunschweig)
16	DF	TUN	Rami Kaib (to Elfsborg)
17	DF	ESP	Carlos Moros (to (Finland) HJK)
18	FW	ANG	Felix Vá (on loan to (Norway) Lillestrøm)
19	DF	SWE	Pierre Bengtsson (retired)
20	MF	SWE	Isak Alemayehu (on loan to (Netherlands) Feyenoord U21)
25	FW	SWE	Kalipha Jawla (on loan to FC Stockholm)
28	MF	SWE	Gideon Granström (on loan to FC Stockholm)
29	FW	SWE	Noel Milleskog (to Sirius)
30	GK	SWE	Tommi Vaiho (to Norrköping)
40	GK	SWE	André Picornell (free agent)
—	DF	KEN	Frank Odhiambo (on loan to Eskilstuna, previously on loan at Vasalund)
—	FW	ALB	Albion Ademi (to Värnamo, previously on loan)
—	DF	SWE	Axel Wallenborg (to Stocksund, previously on loan at Karlstad)

=== Värnamo ===
In:

No.	Pos.	Nation	Player
2	DF	SWE	Johan Rapp (from Landskrona)
8	FW	ALB	Albion Ademi (from Djurgården, previously on loan)
18	FW	SWE	Mohammad Alsalkhadi (from Sandviken)
23	DF	CMR	Samuel Kotto (on loan from Malmö, previously on loan at Landskrona)
31	GK	SWE	David Mikhail (from Täby)
39	GK	SWE	Viktor Andersson (from Malmö, previously on loan at Lund)

Out:

No.	Pos.	Nation	Player
4	DF	BRA	Evaldo Netinho (to (Brazil) Brasiliense)
7	MF	SWE	Charlie Vindehall (to Örgryte)
8	FW	ALB	Albion Ademi (to (China) Tianjin Jinmen Tiger)
9	MF	SWE	Oscar Johansson Schellhas (to Hammarby)
11	FW	SWE	Edvin Becirovic (to GAIS)
23	MF	SWE	Nils Wallenberg (to Norrby, previously on loan)
25	DF	SWE	Victor Eriksson (to (United States) Minnesota United)
26	DF	SWE	Pontus Kindberg (to Ängelholm)
30	GK	BLR	Pilip Vaitsiakhovich (free agent)
31	GK	SWE	Hampus Gustafsson (to Örgryte, previously on loan at Norrby)
33	DF	BRA	Bernardo Vilar (on loan to (Moldova) Sheriff Tiraspol, previously on loan at Helsingborg)

=== Kalmar ===
In:

No.	Pos.	Nation	Player
1	GK	SWE	Samuel Brolin (from AIK)
3	DF	AUS	Alex Gersbach (from (United States) Colorado Rapids)
9	FW	MNE	Dino Islamović (free agent)
11	FW	SWE	Jonathan Ring (from (South Korea) Jeju United)
21	MF	NGR	Abdussalam Magashy (from AIK)

Out:

No.	Pos.	Nation	Player
1	GK	BRA	Ricardo Friedrich (to Malmö)
2	DF	SWE	Axel Lindahl (on loan to Häcken)
3	DF	ISL	Davíð Kristján Ólafsson (to (Poland) Cracovia)
14	FW	SWE	Noah Shamoun (to (Denmark) Randers)
19	MF	FIN	Saku Ylätupa (on loan to (Denmark) Helsingør)
21	FW	TUR	Deniz Hümmet (to Djurgården)
22	MF	SWE	Nahom Girmai (to (Denmark) Næstved)
24	DF	SWE	Sebastian Nilsson (to Oskarshamn)
—	FW	SWE	Isak Bjerkebo (to Varberg, previously on loan at Skövde)
—	FW	SWE	Edvin Crona (to (Finland) Jaro, previously on loan at Oskarshamn)

=== Hammarby ===
In:

No.	Pos.	Nation	Player
11	MF	SWE	Oscar Johansson Schellhas (from Värnamo)
26	DF	DEN	Frederik Winther (from (Germany) FC Augsburg, previously on loan at (Portugal) Estoril)
28	MF	CIV	Bazoumana Touré (from (Ivory Coast) ASEC Mimosas)

Out:

No.	Pos.	Nation	Player
9	MF	BIH	Adi Nalić (to (Netherlands) Almere City)
11	FW	GAM	Bubacarr Trawally (to (Iran) Sanat Naft)
17	FW	NOR	August Mikkelsen (to (Norway) Bodø/Glimt)
22	MF	SWE	Joel Nilsson (to (Norway) Kongsvinger)
23	DF	ISL	Jón Guðni Fjóluson (to (Iceland) Vikingur)
32	DF	GHA	Nathaniel Adjei (on loan to (France) Lorient)
34	MF	SWE	Alper Demirol (on loan to Degerfors)
35	DF	SWE	Ludvig Svanberg (to Sundsvall, previously on loan)
39	MF	TUR	İsak Vural (to (Italy) Frosinone)

=== Sirius ===
In:

No.	Pos.	Nation	Player
6	MF	GER	Michael Martin (from (Germany) SC Paderborn 07)
9	FW	DEN	Yousef Salech (from (Denmark) Brøndby, previously on loan at (Belgium) Beveren)
14	MF	FIN	Leo Walta (from (Denmark) Nordsjælland, previously on loan at Mjällby)
17	MF	DEN	Marcus Lindberg (from (Denmark) Hvidovre)
19	FW	SWE	Noel Milleskog (from Djurgården)
20	DF	SWE	Victor Ekström (from Täby)
34	GK	SWE	David Celic (from Jönköping)

Out:

No.	Pos.	Nation	Player
6	MF	NED	Joeri de Kamps (to (Greece) Volos)
7	FW	RSA	Tashreeq Matthews (to (South Africa) Mamelodi Sundowns)
9	FW	DEN	Wessam Abou Ali (to (Egypt) Al Ahly)
12	DF	ISL	Óli Valur Ómarsson (on loan to (Iceland) Stjarnan)
14	FW	ISL	Aron Bjarnason (to (Iceland) Breiðablik)
23	FW	KOS	Edi Sylisufaj (reloan to Örgryte)
25	GK	POL	Filip Majchrowicz (loan return to (Poland) Radomiak Radom)
27	MF	SWE	Emil Özkan (on loan to Enköping, previously on loan at Stocksund)
32	MF	SWE	Harun Ibrahim (loan return to (Norway) Molde)
33	DF	SWE	Tim Olsson (to Umeå)
35	GK	SWE	Hannes Sveijer (on loan to Eskilstuna)
—	DF	CPV	Kristopher Da Graca (on loan to (Finland) KuPS, previously on loan at (Finland) HJK)

=== Norrköping ===
In:

No.	Pos.	Nation	Player
4	DF	SWE	Amadeus Sögaard (from Brommapojkarna)
11	MF	KOS	Ismet Lushaku (from Varberg)
19	DF	SWE	Max Watson (from (Slovenia) Maribor)
22	FW	SWE	Tim Prica (from (Denmark) AaB)
23	DF	SWE	Joseph Ceesay (on loan from Malmö)
30	GK	SWE	Tommi Vaiho (from Djurgården)

Out:

No.	Pos.	Nation	Player
2	DF	SWE	Jesper Tolinsson (loan return to (Belgium) Lommel)
4	DF	DEN	Marco Lund (to (Hungary) Diósgyőr)
11	DF	SWE	Christopher Telo (free agent)
18	MF	ISL	Ari Freyr Skúlason (to Sylvia)
19	FW	DEN	Victor Lind (loan return to (Denmark) Midtjylland)
23	FW	SWE	Maic Sema (free agent)
28	MF	SWE	Fritiof Hellichius (on loan to Skövde, previously on loan at Sylvia)
29	GK	SWE	Julius Lindgren (on loan to Jönköping, previously on loan at Trollhättan)
30	GK	SWE	Otto Lindell (reloan to Skövde)
32	GK	SWE	Wille Jakobsson (to Degerfors)
34	DF	SWE	Edvin Tellgren (on loan to Skövde, previously on loan at Sylvia)
37	DF	GHA	Kojo Peprah Oppong (reloan to Sundsvall)
45	FW	SWE	Emil Roback (loan return to (Italy) Milan)
—	MF	BRA	Jean (free agent)
—	DF	SWE	Theodore Rask (free agent, previously on loan at Östersund)
—	MF	SWE	Elvis Lindkvist (Västra Frölunda, previously on loan at Sylvia)
—	FW	SWE	Darrell Kamdem Tibell (to (Norway) Sandefjord, previously on loan at Skövde)

=== Mjällby ===
In:

No.	Pos.	Nation	Player
10	MF	DEN	Nicklas Røjkjær (from (Denmark) Fredericia)
13	DF	DEN	Jakob Kiilerich (on loan from (Denmark) Kolding)
19	FW	GAM	Abdoulie Manneh (from (The Gambia) Wallidan)

Out:

No.	Pos.	Nation	Player
2	DF	SWE	Jesper Merbom Adolfsson (to Gefle)
4	MF	FIN	Leo Walta (loan return to (Denmark) Nordsjælland)
8	MF	ISL	Guðmundur Baldvin Nökkvason (on loan to (Iceland) Stjarnan)
9	FW	DEN	Max Fenger (loan return to (Denmark) OB)
10	MF	GHA	Mamudo Moro (to Skövde)
12	MF	SWE	David Löfquist (free agent)
19	MF	SWE	Ludvig Carlius (to (Denmark) Helsingør, previously on loan at Ängelholm)
25	DF	KOS	Argjend Miftari (on loan to Olympic)
28	FW	SWE	Love Björnsson (on loan to Eskilstuna)
29	DF	SWE	Noah Eile (loan return to Malmö)
—	FW	NGR	Yusuf Abdulazeez (on loan to Varberg, previously on loan at Skövde)
—	FW	SWE	Taylor Silverholt (to Helsingborg, previously on loan at Jönköping)

=== AIK ===
In:

No.	Pos.	Nation	Player
6	MF	NOR	Martin Ellingsen (from (Norway) Molde)
8	MF	MLI	Ismaila Coulibaly (on loan from (England) Sheffield United)
10	MF	KOS	Bersant Celina (from (France) Dijon, previously on loan)
14	FW	SWE	Aaron Stoch Rydell (from (Denmark) Nordsjælland U19)
16	DF	DEN	Benjamin Hansen (from (Norway) Molde, previously on loan)
25	DF	NOR	Eskil Edh (from (Norway) Lillestrøm)
30	GK	MLI	Ismael Diawara (from Malmö)
31	FW	LBR	Emmanuel Gono (from (Sierra Leone) Kallon U19)

Out:

No.	Pos.	Nation	Player
6	DF	KOS	Jetmir Haliti (to (Poland) Jagiellonia Białystok)
10	MF	SWE	Jimmy Durmaz (to (Turkey) Gençlerbirliği)
14	MF	NGR	Abdussalam Magashy (to Kalmar)
20	MF	IRL	Zack Elbouzedi (on loan to (England) Swindon Town)
22	MF	CIV	Aboubakar Keita (to (Hungary) Újpest)
25	DF	KEN	Erick Otieno (to (Poland) Raków Częstochowa)
26	DF	SWE	Rasmus Bonde (on loan to Vasalund, previously on loan at Örebro)
34	FW	SWE	Benjamin Mbunga Kimpioka (to (Scotland) St Johnstone)
35	GK	SWE	Samuel Brolin (to Kalmar)
36	FW	SWE	Jonah Kusi-Asare (to (Germany) Bayern Munich U19)
39	FW	KEN	Henry Atola (on loan to Eskilstuna, previously on loan at Norrby)
—	MF	SWE	Elias Durmaz (to (Turkey) Gençlerbirliği, previously on loan at Sundsvall)
—	MF	SWE	Hugo Aviander (to Sundsvall, previously on loan at FC Stockholm)
—	FW	SWE	Calvin Kabuye (to Sandviken, previously on loan at Östersund)

=== Halmstad ===
In:

No.	Pos.	Nation	Player
1	GK	SWE	Tim Rönning (from Elfsborg)
12	GK	SWE	Tim Erlandsson (from Falkenberg)
13	MF	ISL	Gísli Eyjólfsson (from (Iceland) Breiðablik)
19	FW	SWE	Rasmus Wiedesheim-Paul (from (Norway) Rosenborg)
23	MF	ISL	Birnir Snær Ingason (from (Iceland) Vikingur)
26	DF	SWE	Bleon Kurtulus (promoted from junior squad)
27	DF	BRA	Vinícius Nogueira (from Varberg)

Out:

No.	Pos.	Nation	Player
1	GK	SWE	Malkolm Nilsson Säfqvist (to Djurgården)
7	MF	SWE	Kazper Karlsson (to (Italy) Bologna U19)
10	MF	SWE	Erik Ahlstrand (to (Germany) FC St. Pauli)
12	GK	SWE	Malte Påhlsson (to Örebro)
13	FW	SWE	Jack Cooper Love (loan return to Elfsborg)
16	DF	SWE	Benjamin Hjertstrand (to (Kazakhstan) Zhenis)
20	MF	SWE	Pontus Carlsson (on loan to Falkenberg)
23	DF	SWE	Taulant Parallangaj (to Sandviken)
27	MF	SWE	Melvin Sjöland (to Tvååkers, previously on loan)
28	MF	SWE	Leo Hedenberg (on loan to Ängelholm)
30	GK	SWE	Marko Johansson (loan return to (Germany) Hamburger SV)

=== Göteborg ===
In:

No.	Pos.	Nation	Player
4	DF	SWE	Mattias Johansson (free agent)
7	FW	SWE	Oscar Pettersson (from Brommapojkarna)
8	MF	DEN	Andreas Pyndt (on loan from (Denmark) Silkeborg)
9	FW	DEN	Laurs Skjellerup (from (Denmark) Hobro)
11	FW	SWE	Paulos Abraham (on loan from (Netherlands) Groningen)
30	MF	CIV	Malick Yalcouyé (from (Ivory Coast) ASEC Mimosas)
34	GK	NOR	Anders Kristiansen (on loan from (Norway) Sarpsborg 08)

Out:

No.	Pos.	Nation	Player
3	DF	SWE	Johan Bångsbo (to (United Arab Emirates) Al Jazira)
7	MF	SWE	Sebastian Eriksson (retired)
11	FW	NOR	Eman Markovic (on loan to (Norway) Sandefjord)
18	DF	SWE	Felix Eriksson (on loan to (Norway) Sogndal, previously on loan at Utsikten)
22	FW	KOS	Astrit Selmani (loan return to (Israel) Hapoel Be'er Sheva)
27	FW	SWE	David Pérez (loan return to (Italy) Atalanta)
30	MF	SWE	Anton Kurochkin (to Varberg, previously on loan)
—	DF	IRQ	Alai Ghasem (on loan to Eskilstuna, previously on loan at Utsikten)
—	MF	CRO	Filip Ambrož (to Ljungskile, previously on loan)

=== Brommapojkarna ===
In:

No.	Pos.	Nation	Player
4	DF	SWE	Eric Björkander (from (Croatia) Istra)
7	DF	DEN	Frederik Christensen (from (Denmark) Fredericia)
11	MF	SWE	Rasmus Örqvist (from Degerfors)
12	MF	SYR	Daleho Irandust (from (Netherlands) Groningen)
15	MF	SWE	Paya Pichkah (from Sundsvall)
16	FW	DEN	Adam Jakobsen (from (Denmark) Fredericia)
27	DF	DEN	Kaare Barslund (from (Denmark) Nordsjælland)
35	GK	FIN	Lucas Bergström (on loan from (England) Chelsea)

Out:

No.	Pos.	Nation	Player
4	DF	SWE	Amadeus Sögaard (to Norrköping)
5	DF	NOR	Liiban Abadid (on loan to (Finland) Oulu)
7	FW	SWE	Oscar Pettersson (to Göteborg)
10	FW	SWE	Marijan Ćosić (to (Norway) Start)
11	DF	TUN	Monir Jelassi (to Sundsvall)
14	DF	SWE	Jesper Löfgren (loan return to Djurgården)
15	MF	SWE	Samuel Leach Holm (to Djurgården)
22	DF	SYR	Rebin Sulaka (to (South Korea) Seoul)
27	FW	SWE	Zeidane Inoussa (to Häcken)
31	GK	SWE	Otega Ekperuoh (on loan to Täby)
—	DF	SWE	Sebastian Wändin (on loan to FC Stockholm)

=== Västerås ===
In:

No.	Pos.	Nation	Player
7	FW	SWE	Julius Johansson (from Norrby)
8	MF	BEN	Mattéo Ahlinvi (from (Serbia) Čukarički)
15	MF	BEL	Samuel Asoma (from Dalkurd)
20	FW	NGR	Henry Offia (from Trelleborg)
23	DF	SWE	Mikael Marqués (on loan from (United States) Minnesota United)
24	MF	SWE	Marcus Linday (from Assyriska)
28	DF	DEN	William Kaastrup (on loan from (Denmark) Randers)
29	DF	SWE	Alexander Warneryd (from Norrby)
31	DF	SWE	Isak Jönsson (from (Faroe Islands) B36 Tórshavn)
35	GK	SWE	Johan Brattberg (from Häcken)
—	FW	SWE	Marcly Tshikupe (from Varberg, previously on loan at Oskarshamn)

Out:

No.	Pos.	Nation	Player
5	DF	GER	Philipp Strompf (to (Germany) SSV Ulm)
8	MF	SWE	Daniel Ask (to (Denmark) AaB)
10	FW	SWE	Jaheem Burke (to (Slovakia) Spartak Trnava)
13	GK	SWE	Daniel Svensson (free agent)
15	MF	SWE	Olle Edlund (to Varberg)
16	FW	SWE	Anders Hellblom (to FC Stockholm)
22	FW	SWE	Filip Tronêt (to (Gibraltar) Europa Point)
26	MF	SWE	Mohammed Mahammed (to Sandviken)
—	MF	SWE	Hugo Björk (on loan to Franke)
—	FW	SWE	David Burubwa (on loan to Oskarshamn, previously on loan at Motala)
—	MF	SWE	Miguel Sandberg (to Karlberg, previously on loan at Oskarshamn)

=== GAIS ===
In:

No.	Pos.	Nation	Player
5	DF	SWE	Robin Wendin Thomasson (from Eskilsminne)
8	MF	SWE	William Milovanovic (from Utsikten)
11	FW	SWE	Edvin Becirovic (from Värnamo)
13	GK	SWE	Kees Sims (from Ljungskile)
16	FW	SWE	Jack Cooper Love (on loan from Elfsborg, previously on loan at Halmstad)
17	MF	SWE	Amin Boudri (from (Italy) Venezia)
32	MF	SWE	Harun Ibrahim (on loan from (Norway) Molde, previously on loan at Sirius)

Out:

No.	Pos.	Nation	Player
3	DF	SWE	Viktor Krüger (to Oddevold)
5	DF	SWE	Niclas Andersén (retired)
8	MF	SWE	Viktor Alexandersson (free agent)
11	MF	SWE	Julius Lindberg (to Häcken)
16	MF	SWE	Dino Salihović (loan return to Norrköping)
30	GK	SWE	Erik Westgärds (on loan to Ljungskile)

== Superettan ==
Note: Flags indicate national team as has been defined under FIFA eligibility rules. Players may hold more than one non-FIFA nationality.

=== Degerfors ===
In:

No.	Pos.	Nation	Player
1	GK	SWE	Wille Jakobsson (from Norrköping)
2	DF	GUI	Mamadouba Diaby (from Nordic United)
8	MF	SWE	Kevin Holmén (on loan from Elfsborg, previously on loan at Örgryte)
11	FW	SWE	Adi Fisic (from Örebro Syrianska)
15	DF	GHA	Nasiru Moro (from Örebro)
16	MF	SWE	Alper Demirol (on loan from Hammarby)
17	MF	CIV	Luc Kassi (from (Faroe Islands) KÍ)
18	MF	SWE	Teo Grönborg (from Täby)
25	GK	SWE	Rasmus Forsell (from Karlslund)
30	DF	POR	Bernardo Morgado (from (Norway) Hødd)

Out:

No.	Pos.	Nation	Player
1	GK	NOR	Sondre Rossbach (loan return to (Norway) Odd)
2	DF	SWE	Gustav Granath (to (Denmark) Vejle)
5	DF	USA	Joe Gyau (to (United States) Las Vegas Lights)
8	FW	CRC	Diego Campos (to (Costa Rica) Alajuelense)
11	MF	SWE	Christos Gravius (to (Greece) Athens Kallithea)
14	MF	SWE	Hugo Bolin (loan return to Malmö)
15	DF	LUX	Seid Korać (to (Serbia) Vojvodina)
16	MF	SWE	Rasmus Örqvist (to Brommapojkarna)
17	FW	SWE	Carl Ljungberg (to Åtvidaberg)
21	FW	SWE	Peter Gwargis (loan return to Malmö)
22	MF	LBR	Justin Salmon (to (Norway) Egersund)
25	GK	SWE	Jonas Olsson (to Sundsvall)
29	DF	SWE	Doug Bergqvist (to (Czech Republic) Karviná)
40	FW	SRB	Nikola Đurđić (free agent)
46	MF	SRB	Damjan Pavlović (loan return to (Croatia) Rijeka)

=== Varberg ===
In:

No.	Pos.	Nation	Player
9	MF	SWE	Anton Kurochkin (from Göteborg, previously on loan)
10	MF	SWE	Diego Montiel (free agent)
11	FW	SWE	Isak Bjerkebo (from Kalmar, previously on loan at Skövde)
13	MF	SWE	Olle Edlund (from Västerås)
17	FW	SWE	Liam Olausson (from Trelleborg)
20	FW	SWE	Aulon Bitiqi (from Ljungskile)
21	MF	SWE	Isak Vidjeskog (from Skövde)
23	MF	AUS	Marc Tokich (from Skövde)
25	FW	NGR	Yusuf Abdulazeez (on loan from Mjällby, previously on loan at Skövde)

Out:

No.	Pos.	Nation	Player
5	DF	BRA	Vinícius Nogueira (to Halmstad)
6	MF	POR	Filipe Sissé (to (Spain) Rayo Majadahonda)
10	MF	KOS	Ismet Lushaku (to Norrköping)
11	MF	BRA	Éliton Júnior (to (Georgia (country)) Torpedo Kutaisi, previously on loan at (Finland) KuPS)
12	DF	SWE	Vilmer Rönnberg (to (Faroe Islands) B36 Tórshavn)
16	MF	SWE	Adnan Marić (to (Norway) Arendal)
17	FW	DEN	Mads Borchers (to (Finland) VPS)
19	FW	NOR	Kristoffer Hoven (to (Lithuania) Kauno Žalgiris)
21	MF	SWE	Victor Karlsson (to Landskrona)
26	DF	SWE	Alexander Hedman (free agent, previously on loan at Varbergs GIF)
28	FW	SWE	Marcly Tshikupe (to Västerås, previously on loan at Oskarshamn)
32	MF	SWE	Jacob Rendefors (to Tvååkers, previously on loan at Varbergs GIF)
33	MF	SWE	David Bendrik (to Tvååkers, previously on loan at Varbergs GIF)
34	MF	SWE	Gustav Bendrik (free agent, previously on loan at Varbergs GIF)
37	FW	KOS	Dion Krasniqi (to Elfsborg)
39	MF	FRA	Yassine El Ouatki (free agent)
43	GK	SWE	Stojan Lukić (retired)

=== Utsikten ===
In:

No.	Pos.	Nation	Player
2	DF	SWE	Daniel Hermansson (from (Norway) Bryne)
9	MF	SWE	Robin Book (from Jönköping)
13	DF	SWE	Malkolm Moënza (from Jönköping)
15	MF	AFG	Suleman Zurmati (from Trollhättan)
18	FW	SWE	Lucas Lima (on loan from (Norway) Fredrikstad, previously on loan at Helsingborg)
20	FW	MKD	Filip Trpchevski (on loan from Häcken)
21	DF	SWE	Kevin Rodeblad Lowe (from Trollhättan)

Out:

No.	Pos.	Nation	Player
2	DF	SWE	Wilhelm Nilsson (to Helsingborg)
7	FW	SWE	Linus Carlstrand (loan return to Göteborg)
9	FW	SWE	Lucas Hedlund (to (Hungary) Mezőkövesd)
11	FW	SWE	Edin Hamidović (to (Greece) Aiolikos)
13	DF	SWE	Erik Gunnarsson (to (Faroe Islands) 07 Vestur)
15	DF	SWE	Felix Eriksson (loan return to Göteborg)
18	MF	SWE	William Milovanovic (to GAIS)
24	DF	IRQ	Alai Ghasem (loan return to Göteborg)
25	FW	FRA	Yoann Fellrath (to Nordic United)
95	FW	BRA	Paulo Marcelo (to (Portugal) Atlético CP)
99	DF	SWE	Emir Bosnic (to Västra Frölunda)
—	DF	SWE	William Rosberg (to Näsets)
—	FW	SWE	Lukas Johansson (to Västra Frölunda, previously on loan at Tölö)

=== Öster ===
In:

No.	Pos.	Nation	Player
7	MF	SWE	David Seger (from Örebro)
13	GK	SWE	Robin Wallinder (from Gefle)
16	DF	SWE	Raymond Adjei (from Malmö U19, previously on loan at Olympic)
20	FW	SWE	Alibek Aliev (from Trollhättan)
22	MF	SWE	Oskar Gabrielsson (from Räppe GoIF)

Out:

No.	Pos.	Nation	Player
1	GK	SRB	Miloje Preković (to Karlstad)
3	DF	SWE	Månz Berg (to Kosta IF)
7	FW	SWE	Dženis Kozica (to Jönköping)
8	MF	ISL	Alex Þór Hauksson (to (Iceland) KR)
10	FW	SWE	Jesper Westermark (to (Poland) Wisła Płock)
16	MF	SWE	Isak Magnusson (to Rosengård)
30	GK	BIH	Mirsad Basic (on loan to Hässleholm)
—	GK	SWE	Douglas Schwab (to Alvesta GoIF)
—	MF	SWE	Philipp Berndt (on loan to Hässleholm)
—	MF	SWE	Alen Zahirovic (on loan to Hässleholm, previously on loan at Motala)
—	GK	SWE	Victor Stulic (to Räppe GoIF, previously on loan at Hässleholm)
—	MF	EGY	Ahmed Bonnah (to Östersund, previously on loan at Gefle)
—	MF	SWE	Max Eriksson (to Ängelholm, previously on loan at Hässleholm)
—	FW	SWE	André Gustafson (to Ängelholm, previously on loan at Åtvidaberg)

=== Östersund ===
In:

No.	Pos.	Nation	Player
3	DF	CAN	Chrisnovic N'sa (from (United States) Huntsville City)
7	FW	USA	Nebiyou Perry (from (United States) Nashville)
15	MF	ENG	Jamie Hopcutt (from (Finland) Mariehamn)
16	MF	SWE	Albin Sporrong (from (Norway) Mjøndalen, previously on loan)
18	DF	SWE	Philip Bonde (from Sylvia)
20	MF	NGR	Michael Aduragbemi Oluwayemi (from (Nigeria) TikiTaka)
22	MF	EGY	Ahmed Bonnah (from Öster, previously on loan at Gefle)
23	DF	SWE	Ali Suljić (from Eskilstuna)
24	MF	SWE	Henrik Norrby (from Olympic)
28	DF	CIV	Yannick Adjoumani (from (Ivory Coast) ASEC Mimosas, previously on loan)
—	DF	NGR	Ogbu Abraham (on loan from (Nigeria) TikiTaka)

Out:

No.	Pos.	Nation	Player
2	DF	SWE	Cesar Weilid (to Brage)
3	DF	CIV	Kalpi Ouattara (free agent)
4	DF	NOR	Kristian Novak (free agent)
7	MF	SWE	André Österholm (free agent)
15	MF	SWE	Jakob Johnsson (free agent)
18	DF	UKR	Myroslav Mazur (to (Lithuania) Žalgiris)
22	DF	SWE	Theodore Rask (loan return to Norrköping)
24	GK	SWE	Anton Berg (free agent)
29	FW	SWE	Calvin Kabuye (loan return to AIK)

=== Brage ===
In:

No.	Pos.	Nation	Player
5	DF	SWE	Oskar Ågren (from (United States) San Jose Earthquakes)
18	MF	SWE	Ferhan Abic (from Falu)
19	FW	SWE	Ömür Pektas (from Stocksund)
22	DF	SWE	Cesar Weilid (from Östersund)

Out:

No.	Pos.	Nation	Player
5	DF	SWE	Pontus Rödin (to (Denmark) Silkeborg)
8	MF	LBR	Seth Hellberg (to Nordic United)
9	FW	SWE	Douglas Karlberg (to Vasalund)
22	DF	JOR	Jonathan Tamimi (to (Jordan) Al-Hussein)
24	MF	TUN	Yassin Hawat (to Eskilstuna)
—	DF	SWE	Roni Hajo (free agent, previously on loan at Hudiksvall)

=== Landskrona ===
In:

No.	Pos.	Nation	Player
2	DF	SWE	Rassa Rahmani (from Dalkurd)
5	FW	SWE	Filip Sachpekidis (free agent)
7	MF	SWE	Victor Karlsson (from Varberg)
14	MF	SWE	David Edvardsson (reloan from Malmö)
15	MF	SWE	Max'Med Mohamed (from FBK Balkan)

Out:

No.	Pos.	Nation	Player
2	DF	SWE	Johan Rapp (to Värnamo)
3	DF	CMR	Samuel Kotto (loan return to Malmö)
5	DF	SWE	Edvin Dahlqvist (free agent)
11	FW	MLI	Ousmane Diawara (to (Austria) SCR Altach)
15	MF	ESP	Unai Veiga (to (Spain) Alzira)
20	FW	KEN	Xavier Odhiambo (on loan to Rosengård)
22	FW	SWE	Rasmus Wendt (on loan to Eskilsminne)
27	DF	SWE	Alec Brandt Erlandsson (free agent)

=== Trelleborg ===
In:

No.	Pos.	Nation	Player
3	DF	SWE	Charlie Weberg (from Helsingborg)
10	MF	SWE	Hady Saleh Karim (from Jönköping)
11	FW	SWE	Armin Ćulum (from Eskilstuna)
33	GK	SWE	Melker Ellborg (on loan from Malmö, previously on loan at Ariana)

Out:

No.	Pos.	Nation	Player
1	GK	DEN	Kasper Kristensen (to (Denmark) Helsingør)
3	DF	FIN	Mikko Viitikko (on loan to (Finland) Lahti)
10	MF	ERI	Mohammed Saeid (to Örebro)
11	FW	SWE	Liam Olausson (to Varberg)
14	MF	SWE	Lukas Minter Wettergren (to Ariana, previously on loan)
16	FW	SWE	Jesper Dickman (to Olympic)
18	FW	NGR	Henry Offia (to Västerås)
20	MF	LBN	Mouhammed-Ali Dhaini (to (Lebanon) Al Ansar)
23	DF	ISL	Böðvar Böðvarsson (to (Iceland) FH)
26	MF	SWE	Haris Brkić (to (Norway) Sandnes Ulf)
27	MF	SWE	Tom Wassholm (on loan to Torn, previously on loan at IFK Trelleborg)
31	GK	IRQ	Hani Nesajer (to Österlen)
—	DF	SWE	Noah Cavander (on loan to Lödde, previously on loan at Ariana)

=== Gefle ===
In:

No.	Pos.	Nation	Player
1	GK	SWE	Oscar Jonsson (from Sundsvall)
3	DF	SWE	Jesper Merbom Adolfsson (from Mjällby)
6	MF	SWE	Lukas Browning Lagerfeldt (from (Republic of Ireland) Sligo Rovers)
35	MF	SWE	Samuel Adrian (from Jönköping)

Out:

No.	Pos.	Nation	Player
2	DF	SWE	Alexander Jonsson (loan return to Hudiksvall)
7	MF	SWE	Daniel Eliasson (free agent)
10	MF	EGY	Ahmed Bonnah (loan return to Öster)
13	GK	SWE	Robin Wallinder (to Öster)
23	MF	SWE	Oskar Karlsson (to (Australia) Hume City)
37	MF	SWE	Torre Rafael (to Örebro Syrianska)

=== Sundsvall ===
In:

No.	Pos.	Nation	Player
1	GK	SWE	Jonas Olsson (from Degerfors)
2	DF	GHA	Kojo Peprah Oppong (reloan from Norrköping)
3	DF	TUN	Monir Jelassi (from Brommapojkarna)
4	DF	SWE	Ludvig Svanberg (from Hammarby, previously on loan)
6	MF	GHA	Abdul Halik Hudu (from Eskilstuna)
8	MF	ESP	Marc Manchón (from (Spain) Cerdanyola del Vallès)
12	DF	SWE	Pontus Lindgren (from (Iceland) KR)
13	GK	SWE	Daniel Henareh (from AIK U19)
15	MF	USA	Marcelo Palomino (from Eskilstuna)
17	FW	SWE	Gustav Nordh (from Piteå)
19	MF	SWE	Yaqub Finey (from Västra Frölunda)
20	FW	SWE	Oliver Grenholm (from Skellefteå FF)
23	MF	SWE	Hugo Aviander (from AIK, previously on loan at FC Stockholm)
27	MF	SWE	Amaro Bahtijar (free agent)
—	GK	SWE	Sebastian Ekholm (from Ljungskile)

Out:

No.	Pos.	Nation	Player
1	GK	SWE	Oscar Jonsson (to Gefle)
3	DF	SWE	Fredrik Lundgren (to Trollhättan)
4	DF	SWE	Alexander Blomqvist (to Ariana)
6	DF	SWE	Rasmus Lindkvist (to Ariana)
7	MF	SWE	Erik Andersson (to (Denmark) Helsingør)
8	MF	SWE	Ludvig Nåvik (to Umeå)
9	FW	SWE	Linus Hallenius (to Kubikenborg)
13	MF	SWE	Paya Pichkah (to Brommapojkarna)
15	DF	SWE	Robert Lundström (to Ariana)
17	FW	SWE	Alexander Larsson (to Umeå)
19	DF	SWE	Teodor Stenshagen (free agent)
20	MF	SWE	Elias Durmaz (loan return to AIK)
22	MF	SWE	Albin Palmlöf (free agent)
23	GK	SWE	Gustav Molin (to Falkenberg)
29	MF	SWE	Edwim Dellkrans (on loan to Gottne)
33	MF	SWE	Yonis Shino (on loan to IFK Östersund)
—	FW	HAI	Ronaldo Damus (on loan to (United States) Colorado Springs Switchbacks, previously on loan at (United States) San Diego Loyal)
—	GK	SWE	Sebastian Ekholm (free agent)

=== Örebro ===
In:

No.	Pos.	Nation	Player
1	GK	SWE	Malte Påhlsson (from Halmstad)
2	DF	SWE	Tobias Bjørnstad (from (Norway) Notodden)
3	DF	SWE	Oskar Käck (from Sollentuna)
4	DF	SWE	Erik McCue (from (United States) El Paso Locomotive)
5	DF	SWE	Jesper Modig (from Eskilstuna)
8	MF	ERI	Mohammed Saeid (from Trelleborg)
9	MF	SWE	Peter Gwargis (on loan from Malmö, previously on loan at Degerfors)
12	DF	SWE	Theodor Hansemon (from Eskilstuna)
18	FW	SWE	Bilal Fousseni (from Forward U19)

Out:

No.	Pos.	Nation	Player
1	GK	SWE	William Eskelinen (to (Iceland) Vestri)
2	DF	SWE	Daniel Björnquist (free agent)
3	DF	SWE	Ludvig Nicklasson (to Lund, previously on loan at Örebro Syrianska)
4	DF	GHA	Nasiru Moro (to Degerfors)
5	DF	SWE	Daniel Hultqvist (to (Norway) Arendal)
7	MF	SWE	David Seger (to Öster)
8	MF	SWE	Kevin Walker (free agent)
12	MF	SWE	Jake Larsson (to (Lithuania) Žalgiris)
18	DF	SWE	Rasmus Bonde (loan return to AIK)
26	DF	ISL	Axel Óskar Andrésson (to (Iceland) KR)
28	DF	SWE	Johannes Danho (free agent)
31	GK	SWE	Amar Dzevlan (to Örebro Syrianska, previously on loan)

=== Helsingborg ===
In:

No.	Pos.	Nation	Player
3	DF	SWE	Wilhelm Nilsson (from Utsikten)
9	FW	SWE	Taylor Silverholt (from Mjällby, previously on loan at Jönköping)
11	FW	DEN	Milan Rasmussen (from (Denmark) Hellerup)

Out:

No.	Pos.	Nation	Player
3	DF	BRA	Bernardo Vilar (loan return to Värnamo)
5	MF	RSA	Cole Alexander (to (South Africa) Polokwane City)
6	MF	SWE	Andreas Landgren (retired)
9	FW	SWE	Lucas Lima (loan return to (Norway) Fredrikstad)
10	FW	SWE	Rasmus Jönsson (free agent)
11	FW	SWE	Erik Ring (loan return to AIK)
15	FW	IRQ	Amin Al-Hamawi (free agent)
19	MF	FIN	Lucas Lingman (to (Finland) HJK)
21	DF	SWE	Charlie Weberg (to Trelleborg)
24	DF	SWE	Emil Hellman (to (Denmark) Næstved)
34	FW	SWE	Pavle Vagić (loan return to Hammarby)
—	DF	SWE	Victor Blixt (to Österlen, previously on loan at Torn)
—	MF	SWE	Vilgot Carlsson (to Ängelholm, previously on loan)
—	MF	SWE	Victor Göransson (free agent, previously on loan at Ängelholm)

=== Skövde ===
In:

No.	Pos.	Nation	Player
4	DF	SWE	Filip Drinic (from Örebro Syrianska)
7	FW	SWE	Emil Skillermo (from IFK Skövde)
8	MF	MKD	Adrian Zendelovski (from Malmö U19)
9	FW	HAI	Nelson Pierre (on loan from (United States) Philadelphia Union)
10	FW	SWE	Sargon Abraham (from Örgryte)
11	FW	SWE	Jacob Shamoun (from Malmö U19)
16	MF	SEN	Mamadou Ousmane Diagne (on loan from Malmö U19)
17	MF	GHA	Mamudo Moro (from Mjällby)
18	DF	SWE	Edvin Tellgren (on loan from Norrköping, previously on loan at Sylvia)
21	DF	SWE	Marcus Mikhail (from Norrby)
23	MF	SLO	Žiga Ovsenek (from (Kazakhstan) Caspiy)
24	MF	SWE	Fritiof Hellichius (on loan from Norrköping, previously on loan at Sylvia)
25	GK	SWE	Otto Lindell (reloan from Norrköping)
26	FW	ISL	Stefan Ljubicic (from (Iceland) Keflavík)
30	GK	USA	Adrian Zendejas (from (United States) Charlotte, previously on loan at (United States) Miami)

Out:

No.	Pos.	Nation	Player
4	DF	SWE	Aldin Basic (to (Norway) Arendal)
6	MF	AUS	Marc Tokich (to Varberg)
7	FW	SWE	Darrell Kamdem Tibell (loan return to Norrköping)
8	MF	SWE	Oscar Lennerskog (to Trollhättan)
9	FW	SWE	Isak Bjerkebo (loan return to Kalmar)
11	FW	NGR	Yusuf Abdulazeez (loan return to Mjällby)
12	FW	SWE	Jonathan Törner (on loan to Lidköping)
17	DF	SWE	Lukas Rhöse (to Karlstad)
18	FW	SWE	Marc Agerborn (to Lidköping)
21	MF	SWE	Isak Vidjeskog (to Varberg)
23	MF	SWE	David Frisk (to IFK Skövde)
24	MF	SWE	Samuel Persson (to IFK Skövde)
30	GK	SWE	Daniel Engelbrektsson (free agent)

=== Örgryte ===
In:

No.	Pos.	Nation	Player
6	DF	GUI	Mikael Dyrestam (from (Greece) Volos)
7	MF	SWE	Charlie Vindehall (from Värnamo)
12	GK	SWE	Hampus Gustafsson (from Värnamo, previously on loan at Norrby)
17	FW	NGR	Emmanuel Ekpenyong (on loan from (Nigeria) Doma United)
22	MF	SWE	Tobias Sana (from Häcken)
25	DF	SEN	Abdoulaye Faye (on loan from Häcken)
26	FW	KOS	Edi Sylisufaj (reloan from Sirius)

Out:

No.	Pos.	Nation	Player
6	MF	SWE	Kevin Holmén (loan return to Elfsborg)
7	FW	SWE	Sargon Abraham (to Skövde)
12	GK	SWE	Mathias Nilsson (loan return to Malmö)
16	FW	SWE	Villiam Dahlström (loan return to Halmstad)
17	DF	SWE	Hampus Dahlqvist (to Karlstad)
18	MF	SWE	Jonathan Trott (to Jönköping)
21	FW	SWE	Mubaarak Naah (loan return to Malmö)
22	DF	SWE	Marcus Haglind Sangré (to (Poland) Wisła Płock)

=== Sandviken ===
In:

No.	Pos.	Nation	Player
4	DF	SWE	Jonathan Karlsson (from FC Stockholm)
5	DF	SWE	Taulant Parallangaj (from Halmstad)
11	MF	SWE	Ludwig Malachowski (from Eskilstuna)
29	FW	SWE	Calvin Kabuye (from AIK, previously on loan at Östersund)
42	MF	SWE	Mohammed Mahammed (from Västerås)
—	FW	ENG	James Kirby (from Sandvikens AIK)

Out:

No.	Pos.	Nation	Player
4	DF	SWE	Eric McWoods (free agent)
9	FW	USA	Eric McWoods (free agent)
10	FW	SWE	Mohammad Alsalkhadi (to Värnamo)
18	FW	SWE	Emil Hodin (to FC Gute)
20	DF	SWE	William Engstrand Andersson (free agent)

=== Oddevold ===
In:

No.	Pos.	Nation	Player
2	DF	HKG	Alexander Jojo (from (Hong Kong) Tai Po)
15	FW	SWE	Assad Al Hamlawi (from (Thailand) Prime Bangkok)
17	MF	SWE	Olle Kjellman Olblad (from Hässleholm)
18	FW	SWE	Gustav Forssell (from Torslanda)
23	DF	SWE	Viktor Krüger (from GAIS)
24	FW	UGA	John Paul Dembe (on loan from Häcken)
26	MF	SWE	Gabriel Sandberg (from (Italy) Venezia U19)

Out:

No.	Pos.	Nation	Player

== See also ==
- 2024 Allsvenskan
- 2024 Superettan
