= List of Swedish football transfers winter 2020–21 =

This is a list of Swedish football transfers in the winter transfer window 2020–21 by club.

Only transfers in and out between 8 January – 31 March 2021 of the Allsvenskan are included.

== Allsvenskan ==
=== AIK ===
In: Note: Flags indicate national team as defined under FIFA eligibility rules; some limited exceptions apply. Players may hold more than one non-FIFA nationality.

No.	Pos.	Nation	Player
5	DF	SWE	Alexander Milošević (from (Denmark) Vejle)
6	DF	SWE	Jetmir Haliti (from Jönköpings Södra)
9	FW	ARG	Nicolás Stefanelli (from (Chile) Unión La Calera)
14	DF	SWE	Lucas Forsberg (from Sollentuna)
19	MF	FIN	Saku Ylätupa (loan return from (Finland) Mariehamn)

Out: Note: Flags indicate national team as defined under FIFA eligibility rules; some limited exceptions apply. Players may hold more than one non-FIFA nationality.

No.	Pos.	Nation	Player
2	DF	NOR	Daniel Granli (to (Denmark) AaB, previously on loan)
5	DF	EST	Karol Mets (to Ettifaq FC)
6	DF	SWE	Panajotis Dimitriadis (to Akropolis)
8	MF	GHA	Enoch Kofi Adu (to Mjällby)
9	FW	ISL	Kolbeinn Sigþórsson (to Göteborg)
14	FW	SWE	Paulos Abraham (on loan to (Netherlands) Groningen, later sold to them)
15	DF	SWE	Robert Lundström (to GIF Sundsvall)
16	DF	FIN	Robin Tihi (on loan to Eskilstuna)
20	DF	SWE	Rasmus Lindkvist (to (Norway) Hamkam)
24	MF	COD	Heradi Rashidi (to Ararat-Armenia)
28	DF	TUN	Adam Ben Lamin (to Jönköpings Södra)
35	GK	SWE	Samuel Brolin (on loan to Mjällby, previously on loan at Akropolis)

=== BK Häcken ===
In: Note: Flags indicate national team as defined under FIFA eligibility rules; some limited exceptions apply. Players may hold more than one non-FIFA nationality.

No.	Pos.	Nation	Player
9	FW	SWE	Alexander Jeremejeff (from (Germany) Dynamo Dresden)
11	MF	NOR	Tobias Heintz (from (Turkey) Kasımpaşa)
12	DF	ISL	Valgeir Lunddal Friðriksson (from (Iceland) Valur)
13	DF	CIV	Yannick Adjoumani (from (Ivory Coast) ASEC Mimosas)
15	DF	SWE	Martin Olsson (from Helsingborg)
16	MF	CIV	Bénie Traore (from (Ivory Coast) ASEC Mimosas)
25	FW	SWE	Jack Lahne (on loan from (France) Amiens)
30	GK	SWE	Johan Brattberg (from Falkenberg)

Out: Note: Flags indicate national team as defined under FIFA eligibility rules; some limited exceptions apply. Players may hold more than one non-FIFA nationality.

No.	Pos.	Nation	Player
7	MF	IRQ	Ahmed Ghani (to (Turkey) Denizlispor)
9	FW	SWE	Gustaf Nilsson (to (Germany) Wehen Wiesbaden, previously on loan at Falkenberg)
15	FW	NOR	Alexander Søderlund (to (Turkey) Çaykur Rizespor)
18	MF	SWE	Kevin Yakob (to Göteborg)
25	DF	SWE	Aiham Ousou (on loan to GAIS)
28	DF	SWE	Adam Andersson (to (Norway) Rosenborg)

=== Degerfors IF ===
In: Note: Flags indicate national team as defined under FIFA eligibility rules; some limited exceptions apply. Players may hold more than one non-FIFA nationality.

No.	Pos.	Nation	Player
3	DF	SWE	Jonathan Tamimi (from Mjällby)
6	MF	SWE	Nicklas Maripuu (from Akropolis)
10	FW	SWE	Sargon Abraham (from Göteborg)
15	DF	SWE	Sean Sabetkar (from Västerås SK)
17	DF	SWE	Anton Kralj (from (Norway) Sandefjord)
19	MF	SWE	Abdelrahman Saidi (from Norrby)
23	MF	SWE	Adhavan Rajamohan (from Akropolis)

Out: Note: Flags indicate national team as defined under FIFA eligibility rules; some limited exceptions apply. Players may hold more than one non-FIFA nationality.

No.	Pos.	Nation	Player
15	MF	SWE	Axel Lindahl (to (Norway) Bodø/Glimt)
18	MF	SWE	Erik Grandelius (on loan to Åtvidaberg)
24	FW	SWE	José Segura Bonilla (on loan to Åtvidaberg)
28	MF	SWE	Emil Portén (released)
-	DF	SWE	Linus Olsson (released)

=== Djurgårdens IF ===
In: Note: Flags indicate national team as defined under FIFA eligibility rules; some limited exceptions apply. Players may hold more than one non-FIFA nationality.

No.	Pos.	Nation	Player
3	DF	SWE	Hjalmar Ekdal (from Hammarby)
6	MF	FIN	Rasmus Schüller (from (Finland) HJK Helsinki)
8	MF	SWE	Elias Andersson (from Sirius)
10	FW	SWE	Joel Asoro (from (Wales) Swansea City)
11	MF	ALB	Albion Ademi (from (Finland) Mariehamn)
15	GK	RUS	Aleksandr Vasyutin (on loan from (Russia) Zenit St Petersburg)
16	DF	SWE	Jesper Löfgren (from (Norway) Brann, previously on loan at Mjällby)
18	DF	SWE	Isak Hien (from Vasalund)
22	DF	NOR	Leo Cornic (from (Norway) Grorud)
25	MF	SWE	Mattias Mitku (Promoted)
29	FW	JAM	Peter McGregor (on loan from (Jamaica) Duhaney Park)
31	DF	SWE	Axel Wallenborg (from Brommapojkarna)

Out: Note: Flags indicate national team as defined under FIFA eligibility rules; some limited exceptions apply. Players may hold more than one non-FIFA nationality.

No.	Pos.	Nation	Player
6	MF	SWE	Jesper Karlström (to (Poland) Lech Poznań)
8	MF	SWE	Kevin Walker (to Örebro)
11	MF	SWE	Jonathan Ring (to Kalmar)
12	GK	NOR	Per Kristian Bråtveit (on loan to (Netherlands) Groningen)
15	DF	SWE	Jonathan Augustinsson (to (Norway) Rosenborg)
23	MF	NOR	Fredrik Ulvestad (to (China) Qingdao)
29	FW	SWE	Oscar Pettersson (released)
35	GK	NOR	Erland Tangvik (to (Norway) Ranheim)
-	DF	SWE	Johan Andersson (to GAIS)
-	MF	SWE	Dženis Kozica (to Trelleborg, previously on loan at Jönköpings Sodra)
-	FW	SWE	Adam Bergmark Wiberg (on loan to Falkenberg)

=== Halmstads BK ===
In: Note: Flags indicate national team as defined under FIFA eligibility rules; some limited exceptions apply. Players may hold more than one non-FIFA nationality.

No.	Pos.	Nation	Player
9	FW	SWE	Marcus Antonsson (on loan from Malmö, previously on loan at (Norway) Stabæk)
17	DF	GHA	Phil Ofosu-Ayeh (free agent)
24	DF	SWE	Amir Al-Ammari (from Jönköpings Södra)

Out: Note: Flags indicate national team as defined under FIFA eligibility rules; some limited exceptions apply. Players may hold more than one non-FIFA nationality.

No.	Pos.	Nation	Player
13	FW	SLE	Crespo (to Värnamo)
25	MF	SWE	Gabriel Wallentin (on loan to Skövde)
-	DF	SWE	Jacob Olsson (to Ängelholm)
-	FW	SWE	Oliver Hintsa (to Falkenberg, previously on loan at Tvååkers)

=== Hammarby IF ===
In: Note: Flags indicate national team as defined under FIFA eligibility rules; some limited exceptions apply. Players may hold more than one non-FIFA nationality.

No.	Pos.	Nation	Player
11	MF	MNE	Vladimir Rodić (loan return from (Norway) Odd)
19	MF	GHA	Abdul Halik Hudu (loan return from GIF Sundsvall)
20	MF	GHA	David Accam (on loan from (United States) Nashville)
21	FW	SWE	Astrit Selmani (from Varberg)
23	DF	ISL	Jón Gudni Fjóluson (from (Norway) Brann)
–	MF	NGR	Oluwatobi Abimbola (on loan from Aweskim Academy)
–	MF	NGR	David Ankeye (on loan from Sidos)
–	MF	NGR	Olatomi Olaniyan (on loan from Sidos)
–	FW	NGR	Miekam Zuokemefa (on loan from Aweskim Academy)

Out: Note: Flags indicate national team as defined under FIFA eligibility rules; some limited exceptions apply. Players may hold more than one non-FIFA nationality.

No.	Pos.	Nation	Player
5	DF	SWE	David Fällman (to (Norway) Aalesund)
14	DF	SWE	Tim Söderström (to (Portugal) Marítimo)
19	MF	GAB	Serge-Junior Martinsson Ngouali (to (Croatia) Gorica)
20	MF	SWE	Alexander Kačaniklić (to (Croatia) Hajduk Split)
23	FW	USA	Aron Jóhannsson (to (Poland) Lech Poznań)
25	GK	SWE	Davor Blažević (on loan to GIF Sundsvall)
26	DF	SWE	Kalle Björklund (on loan to Falkenberg)
28	DF	BRA	Jean (to Varberg)
-	DF	SWE	Hjalmar Ekdal (to Djurgården, previously on loan at Sirius)

=== IF Elfsborg ===
In: Note: Flags indicate national team as defined under FIFA eligibility rules; some limited exceptions apply. Players may hold more than one non-FIFA nationality.

No.	Pos.	Nation	Player
6	DF	DEN	André Rømer (from (Denmark) Randers)
11	FW	SWE	Ahmed Qasem (from Motala)
30	GK	SWE	Simon Andersson (from (England) Brentford)
-	DF	GAM	Maudo Jarjué (on loan from Austria Wien)

Out: Note: Flags indicate national team as defined under FIFA eligibility rules; some limited exceptions apply. Players may hold more than one non-FIFA nationality.

No.	Pos.	Nation	Player
5	DF	SWE	Gustav Henriksson (to (Austria) Wolfsberger AC)
7	FW	TUR	Deniz Hümmet (on loan to Örebro)
13	DF	SWE	Rami Kaib (to (Netherlands) Heerenveen)
24	MF	SWE	Rasmus Rosenqvist (released)
25	FW	SWE	Arian Kabashi (released, previously on loan at Dalkurd)
30	GK	SWE	David Olsson (to Lindome GIF)
33	MF	NOR	Sivert Heltne Nilsen (to (Belgium) Waasland-Beveren)

=== IFK Göteborg ===
In: Note: Flags indicate national team as defined under FIFA eligibility rules; some limited exceptions apply. Players may hold more than one non-FIFA nationality.

No.	Pos.	Nation	Player
4	DF	SWE	Carl Johansson (from Falkenberg)
11	FW	ISL	Kolbeinn Sigþórsson (from AIK)
12	GK	SWE	Ole Söderberg (from Kalmar)
14	MF	SWE	Gustaf Norlin (from Varberg)
17	MF	SVK	Marek Hamšík (from (China) Dalian Professional)
18	MF	SWE	Isak Dahlqvist (Promoted)
20	MF	SWE	Simon Thern (from Norrköping)
23	MF	SWE	Kevin Yakob (from BK Häcken)
34	FW	SWE	Oscar Vilhelmsson (Promoted)
-	DF	SWE	Oscar Wendt (from (Germany) Borussia Mönchengladbach, coming in the summer)
-	FW	SWE	Marcus Berg (from (Russia) Krasnodar, coming in the summer)

Out: Note: Flags indicate national team as defined under FIFA eligibility rules; some limited exceptions apply. Players may hold more than one non-FIFA nationality.

No.	Pos.	Nation	Player
4	DF	SWE	Kristopher Da Graca (to (Netherlands) VVV-Venlo)
6	DF	SWE	Rasmus Wikström (on loan to Eskilstuna)
11	MF	SWE	Amin Affane (released)
14	FW	SWE	Christian Kouakou (to Sirius)
16	FW	SWE	Sargon Abraham (to Degerfors)
22	FW	GEO	Giorgi Kharaishvili (to (Hungary) Ferencváros)
23	DF	SWE	Emil Holm (to (Denmark) SønderjyskE)
26	DF	ARM	André Calisir (to (Greece) Apollon Smyrnis)
31	GK	SWE	Tom Amos (on loan to Utsikten)
-	MF	SWE	Adil Titi (on loan to Brage, previously on loan at Norrby)

=== IFK Norrköping ===
In: Note: Flags indicate national team as defined under FIFA eligibility rules; some limited exceptions apply. Players may hold more than one non-FIFA nationality.

No.	Pos.	Nation	Player
1	GK	SWE	Oscar Jansson (from Örebro)
3	DF	ISL	Finnur Tómas Pálmason (from (Iceland) KR Reykjavík)
4	DF	DEN	Marco Lund (from (Denmark) OB)
9	FW	NGR	Samuel Adegbenro (from (Norway) Rosenborg)
16	DF	SWE	Viktor Agardius (from Mjällby)
17	MF	SWE	Theodore Rask (Promoted)
21	DF	SWE	Dino Salihovic (Promoted)
24	GK	SWE	Wille Jakobsson (from Eskilstuna)
27	DF	ISL	Jóhannes Kristinn Bjarnason (from (Iceland) KR Reykjavík)
-	DF	ISL	Ari Freyr Skúlason (from (Belgium) Oostende)

Out: Note: Flags indicate national team as defined under FIFA eligibility rules; some limited exceptions apply. Players may hold more than one non-FIFA nationality.

No.	Pos.	Nation	Player
21	MF	SWE	Simon Thern (to Göteborg)
30	GK	SWE	Felix Jakobsson (on loan to Jönköping Södra)
-	GK	SWE	Isak Pettersson (to (France) Toulouse)
-	DF	SWE	Filip Dagerstål (to (Russia) Khimki)
-	MF	SWE	Andreas Blomqvist (to Mjällby)
-	MF	SWE	Linus Hallenius (released)

=== IK Sirius ===
In: Note: Flags indicate national team as defined under FIFA eligibility rules; some limited exceptions apply. Players may hold more than one non-FIFA nationality.

No.	Pos.	Nation	Player
4	DF	SWE	Joseph Colley (on loan from (Italy) Chievo)
6	DF	DEN	Marcus Mathisen (from Falkenberg)
9	FW	SWE	Christian Kouakou (from Göteborg)
14	MF	ISL	Aron Bjarnason (from (Hungary) Újpest)
22	DF	SWE	Patrick Nwadike (from Landskrona BoIS)
91	GK	MKD	David Mitov Nilsson (from (Norway) Sarpsborg 08)

Out: Note: Flags indicate national team as defined under FIFA eligibility rules; some limited exceptions apply. Players may hold more than one non-FIFA nationality.

No.	Pos.	Nation	Player
4	DF	GAM	Kebba Ceesay (to Vasalund, previously on loan at Helsingborg)
5	DF	SWE	Daniel Jarl (released)
7	MF	SWE	Niklas Thor (released)
9	FW	SWE	Jonas Lindberg (released)
10	MF	SWE	Elias Andersson (to Djurgården)
11	FW	SWE	André Österholm (released)
13	DF	SWE	Hjalmar Ekdal (loan return to Hammarby)
21	MF	SWE	Simon Gefvert (to Västerås)
22	FW	SWE	Stefano Vecchia (to (Norway) Rosenborg)
77	FW	NGR	Kennedy Igboananike (to (Finland) Mariehamn)
-	MF	SWE	Isak Bråholm (on loan to Sandviken)

=== Kalmar FF ===
In: Note: Flags indicate national team as defined under FIFA eligibility rules; some limited exceptions apply. Players may hold more than one non-FIFA nationality.

No.	Pos.	Nation	Player
11	MF	SWE	Jonathan Ring (from Djurgården)
14	MF	SWE	Noah Shamoun (from Assyriska Turabdin)
19	DF	SWE	Lukas Rhöse (from Karlstad)
20	MF	NOR	Oliver Berg (from GIF Sundsvall)
25	FW	SWE	Alex Mortensen (Promoted)
-	DF	NOR	Lars Sætra (from (Norway) Tromsø)

Out: Note: Flags indicate national team as defined under FIFA eligibility rules; some limited exceptions apply. Players may hold more than one non-FIFA nationality.

No.	Pos.	Nation	Player
1	GK	SWE	Ole Söderberg (to Göteborg)
4	DF	KOS	Fidan Aliti (to (Switzerland) Zürich, previously on loan)
9	FW	NOR	Geir André Herrem (to (Norway) Åsane)
12	FW	SWE	Adrian Edqvist (released)
16	MF	SWE	York Rafael (to Eskilstuna)
17	DF	NGR	Gbenga Arokoyo (released)
18	MF	SWE	Johan Arvidsson (on loan to Oskarshamns AIK)
22	MF	SWE	Alexander Ahl Holmström (to Eskilstuna)
24	FW	CRC	Mayron George (loan return to (Denmark) Midtjylland, later loaned to (France) Pau)
25	MF	BRA	Jajá (released)
93	MF	BRA	Rafinha (released)
95	FW	BRA	Maxwell (on loan to (Brazil) Sport Recife, previously on loan at (Brazil) Cuiabá)
-	GK	SWE	Pontus Zvar (to Mjällby)
-	DF	SWE	Olle Lindqvist (to Oskarshamns AIK, previously on loan)

=== Malmö FF ===
In: Note: Flags indicate national team as defined under FIFA eligibility rules; some limited exceptions apply. Players may hold more than one non-FIFA nationality.

No.	Pos.	Nation	Player
1	GK	SWE	Melker Ellborg (Promoted)
9	FW	CRO	Antonio Čolak (on loan from (Greece) PAOK)
19	MF	SRB	Veljko Birmančević (from (Serbia) Čukarički)
26	MF	SWE	Muubarak Nuuh (Promoted)
28	MF	SWE	David Edvardsson (Promoted)
29	DF	SWE	Noah Eile (Promoted)
-	DF	MLI	Ismaël Sidibé (from (Mali) Performance de Kabala)

Out: Note: Flags indicate national team as defined under FIFA eligibility rules; some limited exceptions apply. Players may hold more than one non-FIFA nationality.

No.	Pos.	Nation	Player
1	GK	CZE	Dušan Melichárek (released)
4	DF	SWE	Behrang Safari (to Lunds SK)
8	MF	ISL	Arnór Ingvi Traustason (to (United States) New England Revolution)
17	DF	SWE	Rasmus Bengtsson (released)
18	MF	USA	Romain Gall (on loan to Örebro)
23	FW	SWE	Marcus Antonsson (on loan to Halmstad, previously on loan at (Norway) Stabæk)
35	MF	SWE	Samuel Adrian (on loan to Falkenberg)
38	DF	SWE	Linus Borgström (on loan to Falkenberg)

=== Mjällby AIF ===
In: Note: Flags indicate national team as defined under FIFA eligibility rules; some limited exceptions apply. Players may hold more than one non-FIFA nationality.

No.	Pos.	Nation	Player
1	GK	SWE	Pontus Zvar (from Kalmar)
2	DF	CRO	Josip Filipović (from (Slovenia) Rudar Velenje)
3	DF	NED	Daan Klinkenberg (from (Norway) Aalesund)
8	MF	GHA	Enoch Kofi Adu (from AIK)
11	FW	SUI	Neftali Manzambi (on loan from (Spain) Sporting Gijón)
14	MF	SWE	Herman Johansson (from Sandviken)
15	DF	SRB	Ivan Kričak (from (Serbia) Radnik Surdulica)
18	MF	AUS	Marc Tokich (from (Australia) Western Sydney Wanderers)
19	MF	SWE	Ludvig Carlius (from Helsingborg)
23	MF	SWE	Andreas Blomqvist (from Norrköping)
35	GK	SWE	Samuel Brolin (on loan from AIK)

Out: Note: Flags indicate national team as defined under FIFA eligibility rules; some limited exceptions apply. Players may hold more than one non-FIFA nationality.

No.	Pos.	Nation	Player
1	GK	SWE	Noel Törnqvist (on loan to Eskilstuna)
2	DF	SWE	Adi Terzić (released)
3	DF	SWE	Amer Eriksson (released)
8	DF	SWE	Viktor Agardius (to Norrköping)
14	MF	SWE	Besard Šabović (to (Turkey) Kayserispor)
17	DF	JOR	Jonathan Tamimi (to Degerfors)
31	MF	ESP	David Batanero (to (Spain) Ibiza)
32	FW	SWE	Erik Pärsson (released)
-	DF	SWE	Jesper Löfgren (loan return to (Norway) Brann, later sold to Djurgården)
-	MF	GAM	Bubacarr Jobe (to Norrby, previously on loan at Örgryte)

=== Varbergs BoIS ===
In: Note: Flags indicate national team as defined under FIFA eligibility rules; some limited exceptions apply. Players may hold more than one non-FIFA nationality.

No.	Pos.	Nation	Player
8	MF	SWE	Albert Ejupi (free agent)
-	GK	SWE	Viktor Dryselius (Promoted)
-	GK	SWE	Philip Mårtensson (from Trelleborg)
-	DF	BRA	Jean (from Hammarby)
-	DF	SWE	Jakob Lindahl (from Sylvia)
-	DF	RSA	Dean Solomons (from (Netherlands) Jong Ajax)
-	DF	SWE	Oliver Stanisic (from Torslanda)
-	MF	SWE	Victor Karlsson (from Onsala)
-	FW	RSA	Ryan Moon (from (South Africa) Stellenbosch)
-	FW	SWE	Robin Simović (from (Norway) Odd)

Out: Note: Flags indicate national team as defined under FIFA eligibility rules; some limited exceptions apply. Players may hold more than one non-FIFA nationality.

No.	Pos.	Nation	Player
9	FW	SWE	Astrit Selmani (to Hammarby)
10	MF	NGR	Monday Samuel (released)
12	FW	SWE	Rasmus Cronvall (on loan to Tvåkker)
16	FW	SWE	Alexander Johansson (on loan to Brage, previously on loan at (Norway) Sandnes Ulf)
19	MF	SWE	Gustaf Norlin (to Göteborg)
25	FW	SWE	Alibek Aliev (released)
28	MF	KOS	Erion Sadiku (to (Italy) Genoa)
30	GK	SWE	Stojan Lukić (retired)
33	GK	SWE	Albin Svensson (released)
-	MF	SWE	Robin Book (loan return to Örebro, later sold to Jönköpings Sodra)
-	FW	SWE	Junes Barny (released)

=== Örebro SK ===
In: Note: Flags indicate national team as defined under FIFA eligibility rules; some limited exceptions apply. Players may hold more than one non-FIFA nationality.

No.	Pos.	Nation	Player
1	GK	FRA	Bobby Allain (from (Greece) Olympiacos)
11	FM	KOS	Alfred Ajdarević (loan return from Frej)
21	MF	SWE	Taha Ali (from Sollentuna)
27	DF	DEN	Andreas Skovgaard (from (Netherlands) Heerenveen, previously on loan)
28	MF	USA	Romain Gall (on loan from Malmö)
30	GK	SWE	Mergim Krasniqi (from Norrby)
48	MF	SWE	Noel Milleskog (Promoted)
89	MF	SWE	Kevin Walker (from Djurgården)
99	FW	TUR	Deniz Hümmet (on loan from Elfsborg)

Out: Note: Flags indicate national team as defined under FIFA eligibility rules; some limited exceptions apply. Players may hold more than one non-FIFA nationality.

No.	Pos.	Nation	Player
1	GK	SWE	Oscar Jansson (to Norrköping)
4	DF	BRA	Fabio (on loan to Dalkurd)
18	FW	NGR	Isaac Boye (on loan to Karlstad)
20	MF	SWE	Robin Book (to Jönköpings Sodra, previously on loan at Varberg)
21	MF	SWE	Simon Amin (to Trelleborg)
22	DF	FIN	Albin Granlund (released)
23	DF	SWE	Daniel Björkman (to (Faroe Islands) KÍ)
30	GK	USA	Jake McGuire (released)
46	DF	SWE	Helmer Andersson (on loan to Karlslunds)
-	DF	SWE	Arvid Brorsson (to Örgryte, previously on loan)

=== Östersunds FK ===
In: Note: Flags indicate national team as defined under FIFA eligibility rules; some limited exceptions apply. Players may hold more than one non-FIFA nationality.

No.	Pos.	Nation	Player

Out: Note: Flags indicate national team as defined under FIFA eligibility rules; some limited exceptions apply. Players may hold more than one non-FIFA nationality.

No.	Pos.	Nation	Player
4	DF	SWE	Thomas Isherwood (to (Germany) Darmstadt 98)
15	MF	ENG	Alex Purver (released)
30	GK	ENG	Andrew Mills (released)
34	DF	SWE	Pontus Kindberg (to Värnamo)
