= List of Swedish football transfers summer 2020 =

This is a list of Swedish football transfers in the 2020 summer transfer window by club. Only clubs of the 2020 Allsvenskan are included.

== Allsvenskan ==
=== AIK ===
In: Note: Flags indicate national team as defined under FIFA eligibility rules; some limited exceptions apply. Players may hold more than one non-FIFA nationality.

No.	Pos.	Nation	Player
4		SWE	Sotirios Papagiannopoulos (from (Denmark) Copenhagen)
16		SWE	Robin Tihi (promoted from junior squad)
21		SRB	Bojan Radulović (from (England) Brighton)
22		SWE	Filip Rogić (from (Russia) Orenburg)
26		SWE	Yasin Ayari (promoted from junior squad)
33		SWE	Mikael Lustig (from (Belgium) Gent)
34		SWE	Erik Ring (promoted from junior squad)

Out: Note: Flags indicate national team as defined under FIFA eligibility rules; some limited exceptions apply. Players may hold more than one non-FIFA nationality.

No.	Pos.	Nation	Player
2	DF	NOR	Daniel Granli (on loan to (Denmark) AaB)
19		FIN	Saku Ylätupa (on loan to (Finland) IFK Mariehamn)
21		ALB	Jasir Asani (loan return to (Albania) Partizani)

=== Djurgården ===
In: Note: Flags indicate national team as defined under FIFA eligibility rules; some limited exceptions apply. Players may hold more than one non-FIFA nationality.

No.	Pos.	Nation	Player
2		SWE	Jesper Nyholm (from AIK)
7		SWE	Magnus Eriksson (from (United States) San José Earthquakes)
25		SWE	Mattias Mitku (promoted from junior squad)
27		SWE	Melker Jonsson (promoted from junior squad)

Out: Note: Flags indicate national team as defined under FIFA eligibility rules; some limited exceptions apply. Players may hold more than one non-FIFA nationality.

No.	Pos.	Nation	Player
10		SWE	Astrit Ajdarević (to Akropolis)
29		SWE	Oscar Pettersson (on loan to Akropolis)

=== Elfsborg ===
In: Note: Flags indicate national team as defined under FIFA eligibility rules; some limited exceptions apply. Players may hold more than one non-FIFA nationality.

No.	Pos.	Nation	Player
19		DEN	Jeppe Okkels (from (Denmark) Silkeborg)

Out: Note: Flags indicate national team as defined under FIFA eligibility rules; some limited exceptions apply. Players may hold more than one non-FIFA nationality.

No.	Pos.	Nation	Player
7	FW	TUR	Deniz Hümmet (on loan to Örebro)
11		SWE	Jesper Karlsson (to (Netherlands) AZ)
19		SWE	Tim Stålheden (to Tvååker)
25		SWE	Eduart Iljazi (to Trollhättan)
26		SWE	Marokhy Ndione (on loan to Örgryte)
29		SWE	Anton Thorsson (to Assyriska Turabdin)

=== Falkenberg ===
In: Note: Flags indicate national team as defined under FIFA eligibility rules; some limited exceptions apply. Players may hold more than one non-FIFA nationality.

No.	Pos.	Nation	Player
26		FRA	Grégoire Amiot (on loan from (Netherlands) Fortuna Sittard)
29		SWE	Gustaf Nilsson (on loan from Häcken)
34		SWE	Axel Norén (from Gefle)

Out: Note: Flags indicate national team as defined under FIFA eligibility rules; some limited exceptions apply. Players may hold more than one non-FIFA nationality.

No.	Pos.	Nation	Player

=== Hammarby ===
In: Note: Flags indicate national team as defined under FIFA eligibility rules; some limited exceptions apply. Players may hold more than one non-FIFA nationality.

No.	Pos.	Nation	Player
30		SWE	Mohanad Jeahze (from Mjällby)
33	MF	NGA	Akinkunmi Amoo (from (Nigeria) Sidos FC)
35	DF	SWE	Axel Sjöberg (from Frej)
—	GK	USA	Benjamin Machini (free transfer)

Out: Note: Flags indicate national team as defined under FIFA eligibility rules; some limited exceptions apply. Players may hold more than one non-FIFA nationality.

No.	Pos.	Nation	Player
11	MF	MNE	Vladimir Rodić (on loan to (Norway) Odd)
22	FW	SWE	Muamer Tanković (to (Greece) AEK Athens)
28		BRA	Jean (on loan to (Finland) TPS)
35	DF	SWE	Axel Sjöberg (on loan to Frej)
—	GK	USA	Benjamin Machini (on loan to Frej)
—		GHA	Abdul Halik Hudu (on loan to GIF Sundsvall, previously on loan at Frej)

=== Helsingborg ===
In: Note: Flags indicate national team as defined under FIFA eligibility rules; some limited exceptions apply. Players may hold more than one non-FIFA nationality.

No.	Pos.	Nation	Player
3		SWE	Marcus Olsson (free transfer)
20		SWE	Shkodran Maholli (from (Denmark) Silkeborg)
21		GAM	Kebba Ceesay (on loan from Sirius)
32		SWE	Ludvig Carlius (promoted from junior squad)
36		SWE	Victor Göransson (promoted from junior squad)
32		SWE	Emil Hellman (promoted from junior squad)
40		SWE	Ian Pettersson (promoted from junior squad)
42		USA	Mix Diskerud (on loan from (England) Manchester City)
47		SWE	Casper Widell (promoted from junior squad)
50	GK	SWE	Nils Arvidsson (promoted from junior squad)

Out: Note: Flags indicate national team as defined under FIFA eligibility rules; some limited exceptions apply. Players may hold more than one non-FIFA nationality.

No.	Pos.	Nation	Player
3		MKD	Egzon Bejtulai (to (North Macedonia) Shkëndija)
7		DEN	Anders Randrup (to (Denmark) Hvidovre)
8		SWE	Armin Gigović (to (Russia) Rostov)
24		SWE	Filip Sjöberg (to Dalkurd)

=== Häcken ===
In: Note: Flags indicate national team as defined under FIFA eligibility rules; some limited exceptions apply. Players may hold more than one non-FIFA nationality.

No.	Pos.	Nation	Player
1		SWE	Pontus Dahlberg (on loan from (England) Watford)
24		MKD	Leonard Zuta (from (Turkey) Konyaspor)
—		SWE	Jakob Hedenquist (promoted from junior squad)

Out: Note: Flags indicate national team as defined under FIFA eligibility rules; some limited exceptions apply. Players may hold more than one non-FIFA nationality.

No.	Pos.	Nation	Player
9		SWE	Gustaf Nilsson (on loan to Falkenberg)
18		SWE	Kevin Yakob (on loan to Utsikten)
24		MKD	Leonard Zuta (to (Italy) Lecce)
25		SWE	Aiham Ousou (on loan to Eskilstuna)
27		SWE	Adnan Marić (to GAIS)

=== IFK Göteborg ===
In: Note: Flags indicate national team as defined under FIFA eligibility rules; some limited exceptions apply. Players may hold more than one non-FIFA nationality.

No.	Pos.	Nation	Player
2		SWE	Jesper Tolinsson (promoted from junior squad)
7		SWE	Sebastian Eriksson (from (Italy) Genoa)
14		SWE	Christian Kouakou (from Brage)
18		SWE	Isak Dahlqvist (promoted from junior squad)
27		SWE	Yahya Kalley (from Malmö U19)
30		SWE	Mattias Bjärsmyr (from (Turkey) Genclerbirligi)
86		SWE	Pontus Wernbloom (from (Greece) PAOK)

Out: Note: Flags indicate national team as defined under FIFA eligibility rules; some limited exceptions apply. Players may hold more than one non-FIFA nationality.

No.	Pos.	Nation	Player
3		SWE	Adil Titi (on loan to Norrby)
20		SWE	Victor Wernersson (to (Belgium) Mechelen)
27		COD	Nzuzi Toko (to (Germany) Würzburger Kickers)
—		GHA	Lawson Sabah (to Linköping City, previously on loan)

=== Kalmar ===
In: Note: Flags indicate national team as defined under FIFA eligibility rules; some limited exceptions apply. Players may hold more than one non-FIFA nationality.

No.	Pos.	Nation	Player
1	GK	SWE	Ole Söderberg (free transfer)
5		SWE	Doug Bergqvist (from (Poland) Arka Gdynia)
12		SWE	Adrian Edqvist (loan return from (Netherlands) Go Ahead Eagles)
21		SWE	Erik Israelsson (from (Norway) Vålerenga)
24		CRC	Mayron George (on loan from (Denmark) Midtjylland)
25		BRA	Jajá (free transfer)
26		SWE	Victor Backman (promoted from junior squad)

Out: Note: Flags indicate national team as defined under FIFA eligibility rules; some limited exceptions apply. Players may hold more than one non-FIFA nationality.

No.	Pos.	Nation	Player
11		SWE	Svante Ingelsson (loan return to (Italy) Udinese)
18		SWE	Johan Arvidsson (on loan to Oskarshamn)

=== Malmö ===
In: Note: Flags indicate national team as defined under FIFA eligibility rules; some limited exceptions apply. Players may hold more than one non-FIFA nationality.

No.	Pos.	Nation	Player
11		SWE	Ola Toivonen (from (Australia) Melbourne Victory)
14		SWE	Felix Beijmo (from (Germany) Werder Bremen)
16	GK	SWE	Mathias Nilsson (loan return from Lund)
30	GK	SWE	Marko Johansson (loan return from Mjällby)
31		SWE	Franz Brorsson (loan return from (Denmark) Esbjerg)
—		SWE	Sebastian Nanasi (promoted from junior squad)

Out: Note: Flags indicate national team as defined under FIFA eligibility rules; some limited exceptions apply. Players may hold more than one non-FIFA nationality.

No.	Pos.	Nation	Player
9	FW	SWE	Guillermo Molins (to (Norway) Sarpsborg 08)
18		USA	Romain Gall (on loan to Örebro, previously on loan at (Norway) Stabæk)
21		COM	Fouad Bachirou (to (England) Nottingham Forest)
23	FW	SWE	Marcus Antonsson (on loan to (Norway) Stabæk)
33		SWE	Amel Mujanić (on loan to (Denmark) Hobro)
34		SWE	Pavle Vagić (on loan to Jönköpings Södra)
37		SWE	Tim Prica (to (Denmark) AaB)
40		SWE	Hugo Andersson (on loan to (Denmark) Hobro)
—		SWE	Sebastian Nanasi (on loan to Varberg)

=== Mjällby ===
In: Note: Flags indicate national team as defined under FIFA eligibility rules; some limited exceptions apply. Players may hold more than one non-FIFA nationality.

No.	Pos.	Nation	Player
2		SWE	Adi Terzic (on loan to Dalkurd)
5		SWE	Kadir Hodžić (from Dalkurd)
8		SWE	Viktor Agardius (from (Italy) Livorno)
11		DEN	Martin Spelmann (free transfer)
17		JOR	Jonathan Tamimi (free transfer)
30	GK	SWE	Marko Johansson (loan return to Malmö)
—		SWE	Max Rundqvist (from Nosaby)

Out: Note: Flags indicate national team as defined under FIFA eligibility rules; some limited exceptions apply. Players may hold more than one non-FIFA nationality.

No.	Pos.	Nation	Player
5		SWE	Mohanad Jeahze (to Hammarby)
—		SWE	Max Rundqvist (on loan to Nosaby)

=== Norrköping ===
In: Note: Flags indicate national team as defined under FIFA eligibility rules; some limited exceptions apply. Players may hold more than one non-FIFA nationality.

No.	Pos.	Nation	Player
6	DF	SWE	Eric Smith (on loan from (Belgium) Gent)
8	FW	SWE	Linus Hallenius (from (Cyprus) APOEL)
18	DF	SWE	Linus Wahlqvist (from (Germany) Dynamo Dresden)
15	MF	NGA	Ishaq Abdulrazak (from (Nigeria) Unity Academy)
19	FW	SWE	Lucas Lima (promoted from junior squad)
31	GK	BIH	Vladimir Sudar (on loan from Team TG)
99	FW	MNE	Sead Hakšabanović (from (England) West Ham, previously on loan)

Out: Note: Flags indicate national team as defined under FIFA eligibility rules; some limited exceptions apply. Players may hold more than one non-FIFA nationality.

No.	Pos.	Nation	Player
15	MF	SWE	Carl Björk (on loan to Trelleborg)
22	DF	CRC	Ian Smith (to (Costa Rica) Alajuelense)
31	GK	BIH	Vladimir Sudar (loan return to Team TG)

=== Sirius ===
In: Note: Flags indicate national team as defined under FIFA eligibility rules; some limited exceptions apply. Players may hold more than one non-FIFA nationality.

No.	Pos.	Nation	Player
27		SWE	Johan Karlsson (promoted from junior squad)

Out: Note: Flags indicate national team as defined under FIFA eligibility rules; some limited exceptions apply. Players may hold more than one non-FIFA nationality.

No.	Pos.	Nation	Player
4		GAM	Kebba Ceesay (on loan to Helsingborg)
20		SWE	Joakim Persson (on loan to Luleå)
24		SWE	Isak Bråholm (on loan to Luleå)
35		SWE	Hannes Sveijer (on loan to Luleå, then on loan to Sollentuna)

=== Varberg ===
In: Note: Flags indicate national team as defined under FIFA eligibility rules; some limited exceptions apply. Players may hold more than one non-FIFA nationality.

No.	Pos.	Nation	Player
5		SWE	Robin Book (on loan from Örebro)
17		GHA	Gideon Mensah (on loan from (Denmark) Nordsjælland)
26		SWE	Sebastian Nanasi (on loan from Malmö)
89		SWE	Junes Barny (free transfer)

Out: Note: Flags indicate national team as defined under FIFA eligibility rules; some limited exceptions apply. Players may hold more than one non-FIFA nationality.

No.	Pos.	Nation	Player
5		SWE	Sebastian Möller (on loan to Ljungskile)
16		SWE	Alexander Johansson (on loan to (Norway) Sandnes Ulf)
—		SWE	William Kvist (to Landskrona, previously on loan)

=== Örebro ===
In: Note: Flags indicate national team as defined under FIFA eligibility rules; some limited exceptions apply. Players may hold more than one non-FIFA nationality.

No.	Pos.	Nation	Player
18	FW	NGA	Isaac Boye (loan return from Ljungskile)
19	MF	SWE	Nahir Besara (from (Cyprus) Pafos)
28	MF	USA	Romain Gall (on loan from Malmö)
33	GK	SWE	Gustav Leijon (promoted from junior squad)
37	FW	FIN	Rasmus Karjalainen (on loan from (Netherlands) Fortuna Sittard)
99	FW	TUR	Deniz Hümmet (on loan from Elfsborg)

Out: Note: Flags indicate national team as defined under FIFA eligibility rules; some limited exceptions apply. Players may hold more than one non-FIFA nationality.

No.	Pos.	Nation	Player
4	DF	SWE	Arvid Brorsson (on loan to Örgryte)
5	DF	BRA	Fabio De Sousa Silva (on loan to Vasalund)
11	MF	SWE	Alfred Ajdarević (on loan to Frej)
20	MF	SWE	Robin Book (on loan to Varberg)
29	FW	SWE	Jack Lahne (loan return to (France) Amiens)
46	DF	SWE	Helmer Andersson (on loan to Karlslund)
—	DF	SWE	Nadir Ayéva (on loan to Karlslund)

=== Östersund ===
In: Note: Flags indicate national team as defined under FIFA eligibility rules; some limited exceptions apply. Players may hold more than one non-FIFA nationality.

No.	Pos.	Nation	Player
6		SWE	Adnan Catic (from Eskilstuna)
9		ENG	Francis Jno-Baptiste (loan return from Eskilstuna)
12		PLE	Ahmed Awad (from Västerås)
17		SWE	Malcolm Stolt (from IFK Östersund)
25		SWE	Nikolaos Dosis (from Djursholm)
26		ESP	Brian Martín Pagés (from (Spain) Tenerife B)
—		SWE	Sebastian Karlsson Grach (from Djursholm)

Out: Note: Flags indicate national team as defined under FIFA eligibility rules; some limited exceptions apply. Players may hold more than one non-FIFA nationality.

No.	Pos.	Nation	Player
6		SWE	Adnan Catic (on loan to Ljungskile)
9		ENG	Francis Jno-Baptiste (on loan to Eskilstuna)
17		NGA	Jordan Attah Kadiri (to (Belgium) Lommel)
26		ESP	Brian Martín Pagés (to (Greece) Apollon Larissa)
34		SWE	Pontus Kindberg (on loan to Stöde)
99		FIN	Bakr Abdellaoui (on loan to (Denmark) Næstved)
—		SWE	Sebastian Karlsson Grach (on loan to Djursholm)
