= Peter Gwargis =

Iraqi footballer (born 2000)

Personal information
- Date of birth: 4 September 2000 (age 26)
- Place of birth: Sydney, Australia
- Height: 1.80 m (5 ft 11 in)
- Position: Right winger

Team information
- Current team: Ceramica Cleopatra

Youth career
- IFK Öxnehaga

Senior career*
Years	Team	Apps	(Gls)
2017	Husqvarna	19	(1)
2018	Jönköpings Södra	16	(3)
2018–2021	Brighton & Hove Albion	0	(0)
2021–2024	Malmö FF	5	(0)
2022	→ Jönköpings Södra (loan)	3	(2)
2023	→ Degerfors (loan)	24	(1)
2024	→ Örebro SK (loan)	15	(1)
2024–2026	Duhok		
2026–	Ceramica Cleopatra	1	(0)

International career^{‡}
2016	Sweden U17	3	(0)
2018–2019	Sweden U19	4	(1)
2024–	Iraq	3	(0)
- * Club domestic league appearances and goals as of 18:05, 18 September 2026 (UTC) ‡ National team caps and goals as of 18 December 2025

Peter Gwargis (born 4 September 2000) is a professional footballer who plays as a right winger for Egyptian club Ceramica Cleopatra. Born in Australia and raised in Sweden, he plays for the Iraq national team.

== Early and personal life ==
Gwargis was born in Sydney, Australia. His parents are Assyrians from Iraq, and the family moved to Sweden when he was three. Gwargis is a Christian.

== Club career ==
Gwargis spent his early career in Sweden with IFK Öxnehaga, Husqvarna and Jönköpings Södra. In January 2017 he was linked with a transfer to English club Arsenal. He signed for Brighton & Hove Albion in August 2018. He made his senior debut for the club on 25 September 2019, in a 1–3 home defeat to Aston Villa in the EFL Cup.

In April 2021 it was announced Gwargis was to be released by Brighton by the end of the season. He was linked to a move to Malmö in May 2021, signing with the club in June 2021.

In February 2022 he moved on loan to Jönköpings Södra, and in April 2023 he moved on loan to Degerfors.

In March 2024 he moved on loan to Örebro SK.

In September 2024, Gwargis moved to Iraqi-Kurdish club Duhok.

In August 2026, Gwargis moved to Egyptian Premier League club Ceramica Cleopatra FC as a free agent.

== International career ==
Gwargis represented Sweden at under-17 and under-19 youth international levels. He was also eligible to represent Australia on account of being born there.

He made his senior international debut for Iraq in 2024.

== Playing style ==
Gwargis has been compared to Mesut Özil.

== Honours ==
Duhok

- AGCFF Gulf Club Champions League: 2024–25
- Iraq FA Cup: 2024–25
