= Adnan Catic =

Adnan Catic may refer to:

- Felix Sturm (Adnan Ćatić, born 1979), German-Bosnian professional boxer
- Adnan Catic (footballer) (born 2000), Swedish footballer
