= Noah Shamoun =

Syrian footballer (born 2002)

Personal information
- Full name: Noah Leon Shamoun
- Date of birth: 8 December 2002 (age 23)
- Place of birth: Huskvarna, Sweden
- Height: 1.75 m (5 ft 9 in)
- Position: Midfielder

Team information
- Current team: Kalmar FF (on loan from Randers)
- Number: 25

Youth career
- Jönköpings BK
- –2013: IFK Öxnehaga
- 2014–2018: Husqvarna FF

Senior career*
Years	Team	Apps	(Gls)
2019–2020	Assyriska Turabdin IK	47	(7)
2021–2023	Kalmar FF	74	(6)
2024–	Randers	15	(0)
2025–2026	→ IFK Värnamo (loan)	21	(2)
2026–	→ Kalmar FF (loan)	5	(0)

International career^{‡}
2021	Sweden U19	2	(0)
2022–2023	Sweden U21	2	(0)
2024–	Syria	12	(1)
- * Club domestic league appearances and goals as of 1 July 2026 ‡ National team caps and goals as of 17 November 2026

Noah Leon Shamoun (Arabic: نوح ليون شمعون; born 8 December 2002) is a professional footballer who plays as a midfielder for Swedish club Kalmar FF, on loan from Danish club Randers. Born in Sweden, he plays for the Syria national team.

== Early life ==
Shamoun is of Assyrian origin. His father Rubel, who was born in Turkey, moved to Sweden with his family when he was two years old, while his mother Ellen grew up in Germany and was 18 years old when she moved to Jönköping.

== Club career ==
Shamoun hails from Huskvarna and went on from Jönköpings BK and IFK Öxnehaga to the youth section of Husqvarna FF. He was noticed by foreign clubs, among others because he posted a skill video online. He was on trial with clubs such as Greuther Fürth in 2018 and AC Parma in 2019. He nevertheless started his senior career in Division 1 with Assyriska Turabdin IK, playing through the 2019 season before turning 17 in December.

In the 2020 Ettan, Shamoun "poured in" goals and assists and was recruited by Kalmar FF. He made his Allsvenskan debut in April 2021 against Östersund. He scored his first goals in May 2022, when he made both goals in a 2–0 victory over Hammarby.

In February 2024, he moved abroad for the first time, signing for Randers in the Danish Superliga. He made his Superliga debut in March 2024 against Midtjylland.

On 7 July 2025, Shamoun was loaned out to Allsvenskan club IFK Värnamo for the rest of 2025, with an option to make the deal permanent. Shamoun left Sweden at the end of the loan spell, returning to Randers ahead of 2026.

== International career ==
=== Sweden ===
Shamoun made his international debut for Sweden U20 in October 2021 against Romania U20, and played for the U21 team in 2022 and 2023.

=== Syria ===
In March 2024, Shamoun was called up for the 2026 FIFA World Cup qualification games against Myanmar.

== Career statistics ==
=== Club ===
As of match played 24 September 2024

Club	Season	League			National Cup (Note: Includes Svenska Cupen, Danish Cup)		Continental		Other		Total	
Club	Season	Division	Apps	Goals	Apps	Goals	Apps	Goals	Apps	Goals	Apps	Goals
Assyriska Turabdin IK	2019	Ettan	19	2	1	0	—		—		20	2
Assyriska Turabdin IK	2020	Ettan	27	5	0	0	—		—		27	5
Assyriska Turabdin IK	Total		46	7	1	0	0	0	0	0	47	7
Kalmar FF	2021	Allsvenskan	20	0	4	1	—		—		24	1
Kalmar FF	2022	Allsvenskan	27	3	4	0	—		—		31	3
Kalmar FF	2023	Allsvenskan	27	3	1	1	2 (Note: Appearance(s) in UEFA Europa Conference League)	0	—		30	4
Kalmar FF	Total		74	6	9	2	2	0	0	0	85	8
Randers	2023-24	Danish Superliga	4	0	0	0	—		0	0	4	0
Randers	2024-25	Danish Superliga	3	0	1	0	—		—		4	0
Randers	Total		7	0	1	0	0	0	0	0	8	0
Career total			127	13	11	2	2	0	0	0	140	15

=== International ===
As of match played 8 September 2025

Appearances and goals by national team and year
National team	Year	Apps	Goals
Syria	2024	6	0
Syria	2025	1	1
Total		7	1
