= Robert Gojani =

Swedish footballer

Personal information
- Date of birth: 19 October 1992 (age 34)
- Place of birth: Kalix, Sweden
- Height: 1.74 m (5 ft 9 in)
- Position: Midfielder

Team information
- Current team: Kalmar FF
- Number: 23

Youth career
- IFK Öxnehaga

Senior career*
Years	Team	Apps	(Gls)
2011–2017	Jönköpings Södra	147	(10)
2018–2021	IF Elfsborg	85	(1)
2021–2023	Silkeborg	31	(0)
2023–	Kalmar FF	82	(3)

International career
2018	Sweden	1	(0)
- * Club domestic league appearances and goals as of 8 July 2026

Robert Gojani (born 19 October 1992) is a Swedish professional footballer who plays as a midfielder for Kalmar FF in the Allsvenskan.

== Club career ==
On 31 August 2021, Gojani signed a deal until June 2024 with Silkeborg IF in the Danish Superliga. On 5 February 2023, Gojani returned to Sweden, signing a 3-year deal with Kalmar FF.

== International career ==
Gojani made his debut for the Sweden national team on 7 January 2018 in a friendly against Estonia.

== Personal life ==
Gojani is of Kosovo Albanian descent.
