= Edin Hamidović =

Swedish association football player

Personal information
- Date of birth: 27 November 1993 (age 32)
- Place of birth: Huskvarna, Sweden
- Height: 1.83 m (6 ft 0 in)
- Position: Striker

Team information
- Current team: Husqvarna FF
- Number: 10

Youth career
- IFK Öxnehaga
- IK Tord
- 2009–2012: Jönköpings Södra IF

Senior career*
Years	Team	Apps	(Gls)
2013	Jönköpings Södra IF	2	(1)
2014	Skövde AIK	23	(11)
2015	Motala AIF	22	(6)
2016–2017	Husqvarna FF	42	(26)
2018	GAIS	30	(11)
2019–2020	Jönköpings Södra IF	54	(26)
2021	Ankara Keçiörengücü	8	(0)
2021–2022	Jönköpings Södra IF	39	(6)
2023	Utsiktens BK	13	(1)
2024	Aiolikos	4	(2)
2025	Haninge	11	(3)
2025–	Husqvarna FF	15	(4)
- * Club domestic league appearances and goals as of 24 November 2025

Edin Hamidović (born 27 November 1993) is a Swedish professional footballer who plays as a forward for Husqvarna FF.

== Career ==
Hamidović started playing football at age six. He played for IFK Öxenhaga and IK Tord before he moved to Jönköping Södra when he was 15. He made his senior debut for the club on 24 August 2013 in a game against Ängelholms FF in Superettan. In his second game for the club he scored his first goal, winning the match for Jönköping, in a 1–0 win over GAIS.

=== Division 1 ===
After not getting a renewed contract Hamidović signed for Skövde AIK in Division 1 Södra, the third tier of Swedish football, ahead of the 2014 season. There he went on to score 11 goals in 23 games but couldn't help his side avoid relegation.

On 5 December 2014 Hamidović signed for Motala AIF in Division 1 Norra. There he played mainly as an attacking midfielder and scored 6 and assisted 6 in 22 games but again couldn't save his team from relegation as they finished on last place.

In 2016 he signed a two-year contract with Husqvarna FF and played 17 games and scored 6 goals in his first season as his side finished sixth in the table.

The following season Hamidović had scored 11 goals after just 12 games which drew interest from Superettan side GAIS. He signed a two-year deal with the club on 3 August 2017 but wouldn't join them until after the season. Hamidovic went on to score 20 goals in 25 games for Husqvarna that season, becoming the second best goalscorer in the league.

=== GAIS ===
He joined GAIS on 1 January 2018. He made his debut for the club against Allsvenskan side IF Elfsborg in the group stage of the 2017–18 Svenska Cupen and scored a goal as he helped his side to an unexpected 3–2 victory. The success continued when he scored two goals in the second match against Hammarby IF in a game that ended 3–3. In the last game GAIS won the group as he scored another two goals in a comfortable 4–0 win over Vasalunds IF. Hamidović played the full 90 minutes in the quarter-final in a 1–0 loss against Östersunds FK. He became the top scorer of the 2017–18 Svenska Cupen with 7 goals, two of them scored with Husqvarna FF.

He scored 11 goals and played all 30 games for GAIS in the 2018 Superettan season where they finished 10th.

== Personal life ==
Born in Sweden, Hamidović is of Bosnian descent.
