= Thomas Boakye =

Ghanaian footballer

Personal information
- Date of birth: 10 May 1993 (age 33)
- Place of birth: Bremang, Ghana
- Height: 1.72 m (5 ft 8 in)
- Positions: Defender; midfielder

Team information
- Current team: Ängelholm
- Number: 17

Youth career
- Right to Dream

Senior career*
Years	Team	Apps	(Gls)
2012–2014	Östersund	40	(7)
2015–2017	Varberg	77	(11)
2018–2024	Halmstad	152	(7)
2025	Njarðvík	8	(0)
	Ängelholm	10	(1)
- * Club domestic league appearances and goals as of 16 November 2026

Thomas Boakye (born 10 May 1993) is a Ghanaian footballer who plays as a defender or midfielder for Swedish club Ängelholm.

== Career ==
Boakye played college football for Hartpury College in England.

Before the 2012 season, he signed for Swedish third division side Östersund, helping them achieve promotion to the Swedish second division.

Before the 2018 season, he signed for Halmstad in the Swedish second division, helping them achieve promotion to the Swedish top flight.
