= IFK Jönköping =

Sports club in Jönköping, Sweden (1989–1998)

- Full name: Idrottsföreningen kamraterna Jönköping
- Sport: soccer
- Founded: 1989
- Folded: 1998
- Based in: Jönköping, Sweden

IFK Jönköping was a sports club in Jönköping, Sweden, with a women's soccer team that played in the Swedish second division during the 1990s. and was established in 1989 out of IK Tord's women's soccer section.

The club won the women's Småland district championship in 1994, 1995 and 1997.

When the women's soccer team was dissolved before the 1997 season, the activity was transferred over to IFK Öxnehaga.
