= Amer Eriksson =

Swedish footballer

Personal information
- Full name: Amer Eriksson-Ibragic
- Date of birth: 6 October 1994 (age 32)
- Height: 1.78 m (5 ft 10 in)
- Position: Defender

Team information
- Current team: Oskarshamns AIK
- Number: 4

Youth career
- Vrigstad IF

Senior career*
Years	Team	Apps	(Gls)
2013–2015	Jönköpings Södra IF	2	(0)
2015	→ Husqvarna FF (loan)	21	(0)
2016–2017	Husqvarna FF	49	(3)
2019–2020	Mjällby AIF	38	(1)
2021	Assyriska Turabdin	26	(0)
2022–	Oskarshamns AIK	73	(1)
- * Club domestic league appearances and goals as of 1 January 2025

Amer Eriksson-Ibragic (born 6 October 1994) is a Swedish football defender who plays for Oskarshamns AIK.

== Club career ==
On 14 February 2022, Eriksson joined Oskarshamns AIK.
