= Vilson Caković =

Serbian footballer

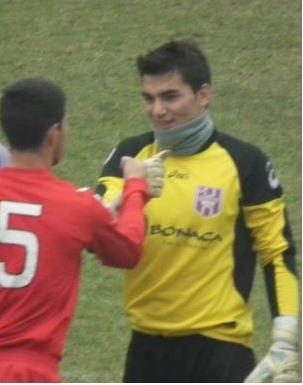

Personal information
- Full name: Vilson Caković
- Date of birth: 22 February 1991 (age 35)
- Place of birth: Gornji Milanovac, SFR Yugoslavia
- Height: 1.85 m (6 ft 1 in)
- Position: Goalkeeper

Team information
- Current team: Husqvarna
- Number: 33

Youth career
- 1998–2004: Takovo
- 2004–2009: Red Star Belgrade

Senior career*
Years	Team	Apps	(Gls)
2009–2011	→ Sopot (loan)	8	(0)
2011–2012	Balkan Mirijevo	27	(0)
2012	AIK Jönköping	9	(0)
2013–2015	Apolonia Fier	53	(0)
2015–2016	Vitanovac 08		
2016–2018	Råslätts	47	(0)
2019–2020	Assyriska IK	43	(0)
2021–	Husqvarna	113	(0)

International career
2008	Serbia U17	3	(0)
- * Club domestic league appearances and goals as of 24 November 2025

Vilson Caković (Serbian Cyrillic: Вилсон Цаковић; born 22 February 1991) is a Serbian football goalkeeper who plays for Swedish club Husqvarna in the Division 1 Södra.

== Career ==
Caković started his career in his birth town by playing for youth of Takovo, where he was spotted by Red Star Belgrade scouts. Since 2004 he has conducted his career through the youth ranks of Belgrade-based teams.

Since 2011, he played for Serbian League Belgrade side Balkan Mirijevo with success and already has five man-of-the-match awards (four in a row, against Žarkovo, Zemun, Beograd and Dorćol), with average rating over 7.5. He finished the season with average rating 7.07 and became Balkan Mirijevo player of the season. After one year in Balkan, he moved to Swedish AIK Jönköping, the subsidiary of the Assyriska Föreningen that plays in Superettan.

After a successful season in Sweden, when the club managed to gain promotion, Caković went back to Balkans. In February 2013 he signed a contract with Kategoria Superiore club Apolonia. In April 2015, the club announced his departure by mutual consent.

In June 2021, Caković signed with Husqvarna FF.

== Honours ==
- Best Keeper: Europa Unita 2007, international U17 tournament in Italy.
- Best Keeper: 2008 UEFA European Under-17 Championship, in Turkey.
- Best Keeper: Lafarge Foot Avenir 2008, international U18 tournament in Limoges (France).
