= Tim Rönning =

Swedish footballer

Personal information
- Full name: Anton Tim Gösta Rönning
- Date of birth: 15 February 1999 (age 27)
- Place of birth: Kilafors, Sweden
- Height: 2.01 m (6 ft 7 in)
- Position: Goalkeeper

Team information
- Current team: Halmstads BK
- Number: 1

Senior career*
Years	Team	Apps	(Gls)
2013–2014	Kilafors IF	2	(0)
2014–2015	Hudiksvalls FF	0	(0)
2014–2015	Forsa IF	12	(0)
2018–2023	IF Elfsborg	81	(0)
2024–	Halmstads BK	32	(0)

International career
2014–2015	Sweden U17	2	(0)
2016–2018	Sweden U19	8	(0)
- * Club domestic league appearances and goals as of 9 July 2026

Tim Rönning (born 15 February 1999) is a Swedish footballer who plays as a goalkeeper for Allsvenskan club Halmstads BK.

Rönning appeared for all Swedish youth national teams up until Sweden U19, and was included on the bench four times for Sweden U21 without playing.
