= Felix Jakobsson =

Swedish footballer (born 2003)

Personal information
- Full name: Felix Konrad Erik Jakobsson
- Date of birth: 16 September 1999 (age 27)
- Height: 1.85 m (6 ft 1 in)
- Position: Goalkeeper

Team information
- Current team: Hammarby IF
- Number: 27

Youth career
- –2014: Svalövs BK
- 2015–2016: Landskrona BoIS

Senior career*
Years	Team	Apps	(Gls)
2017–2018	Eslövs BK	38	(0)
2019	Torns IF	16	(0)
2020–2021	IFK Norrköping	0	(0)
2020	→ IF Sylvia (loan)	29	(0)
2021	→ Jönköpings Södra IF (loan)	4	(0)
2022	Jönköpings Södra IF	8	(0)
2023–2024	Sandvikens IF	56	(1)
2025–	Hammarby IF		
- * Club domestic league appearances and goals as of 22 February 2025

Felix Jakobsson (born 16 September 1999) is a Swedish footballer who plays as a goalkeeper for Hammarby IF in Allsvenskan.

He is a son of Swedish international footballer Andreas Jakobsson. Like his father, Felix Jakobsson was an outfield player initially. Gradually becoming more of a goalkeeper, his first full season as a goalkeeper was at the age of 16, when he played for the youth teams of Landskrona BoIS, having joined from Svalövs BK in 2015. He started his senior career in 2017 with lowly Eslövs BK.

In 2020 Jakobsson secured a move to Allsvenskan, signing for IFK Norrköping. However, he did not play for the team as he instead became first-choice goalkeeper in Norrköping's feeder club IF Sylvia in 2020. In 2021 Jakobsson went on to a season-long loan at Jönköpings Södra IF, but was their second choice. He got the chance in November 2021, being substituted in for an injured Frank Pettersson, and helped J-Södra retain their place in Superettan. He joined J-Södra permanently in 2022.

In 2023 Jakobsson went on to Sandvikens IF. He experienced promotion from the 2023 Ettan with Sandviken, and the team was competitive in the 2024 Superettan as well, vying for another promotion. In August 2024, Jakobsson was noted for recording an assist (to Calvin Kabuye) against Jakobsson's old club Landskrona, before scoring a goal in the following match against Oddevold. The goal came in extra time when Jakobsson headed in a corner kick to equalise to 2–2. He impressed enough to be signed by Hammarby IF ahead of the 2025 season.
