= Philip Mårtensson =

Swedish footballer

Personal information
- Date of birth: 1 September 1993 (age 33)
- Height: 1.88 m (6 ft 2 in)
- Position: Goalkeeper

Team information
- Current team: AFC Malmö
- Number: 1

Youth career
- Eriksfälts FF

Senior career*
Years	Team	Apps	(Gls)
2016	BK Olympic	25	(0)
2017–2018	Torns IF	55	(0)
2019–2020	Trelleborgs FF	2	(0)
2020	→ Landskrona BoIS (loan)	23	(0)
2021–2022	Varbergs BoIS	6	(0)
2024–2025	Eskilsminne IF	46	(0)
2026–	AFC Malmö	14	(0)
- * Club domestic league appearances and goals as of 16 November 2026

Philip Mårtensson (born 1 September 1993) is a Swedish football goalkeeper who plays for AFC Malmö.
