= Sebastian Karlsson Grach =

Swedish footballer (born 2001)

Personal information
- Date of birth: 6 May 2001 (age 25)
- Place of birth: Djursholm, Sweden
- Height: 1.85 m (6 ft 1 in)
- Position: Striker

Team information
- Current team: Den Bosch
- Number: 9

Youth career
- –2020: Djursholm

Senior career*
Years	Team	Apps	(Gls)
2020–2024	Östersund	91	(13)
2025–	Den Bosch	22	(5)
- * Club domestic league appearances and goals as of 25 April 2026

Sebastian Karlsson Grach (born 6 May 2001) is a Swedish professional footballer who plays as a striker for Eerste Divisie club Den Bosch.
