= Dion Krasniqi =

Footballer (born 2003)

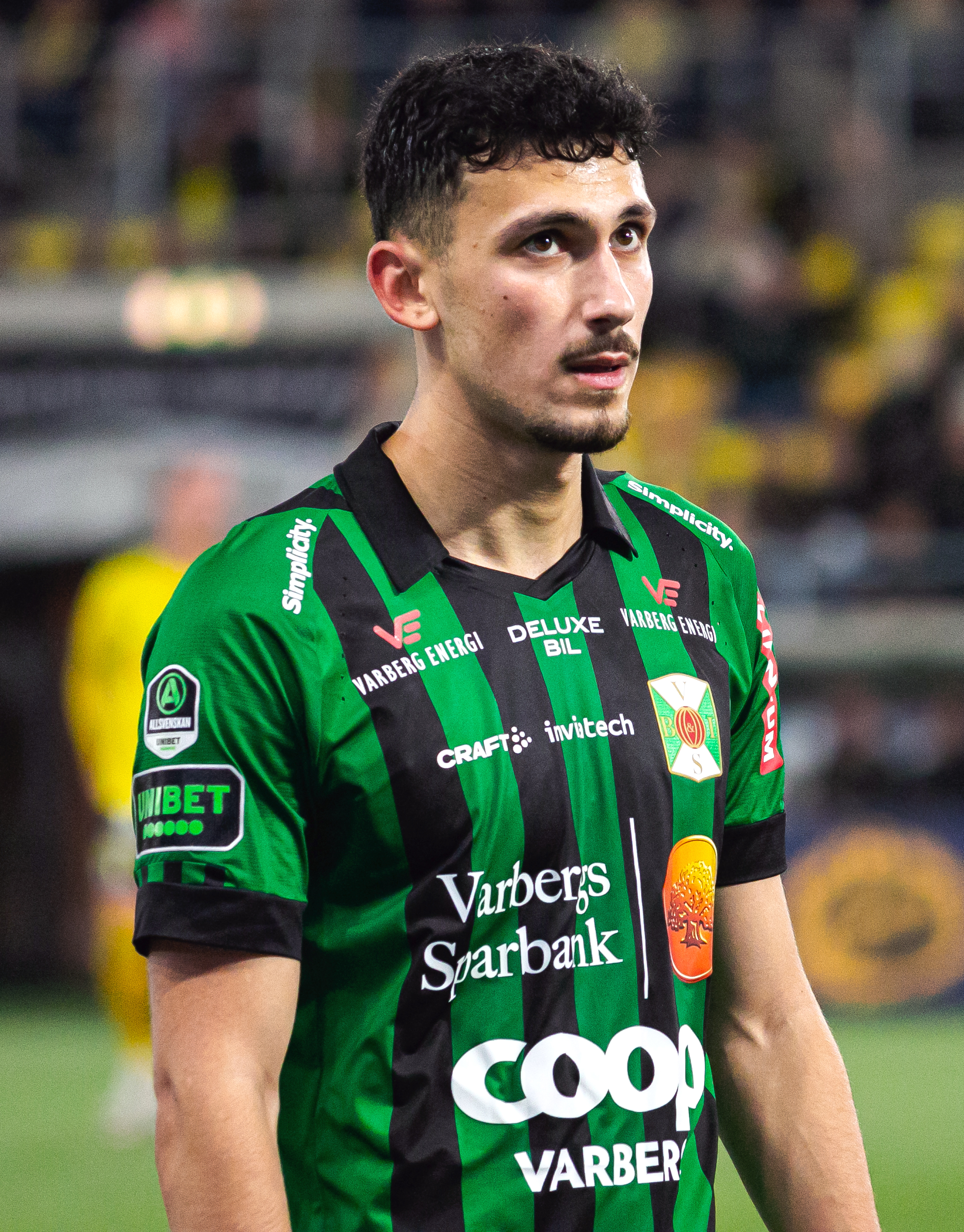
- Krasniqi with Varbergs BoIS in 2023

Personal information
- Date of birth: 24 August 2003 (age 23)
- Place of birth: Eslöv, Sweden
- Height: 1.84 m (6 ft 0 in)
- Position: Forward

Team information
- Current team: Elfsborg
- Number: 22

Youth career
- –2018: Eslövs BK
- 2019–2021: Lunds BK

Senior career*
Years	Team	Apps	(Gls)
2019–2022	Lunds BK	24	(5)
2022–2023	Varbergs BoIS	31	(6)
2024–	Elfsborg	8	(0)
2024	→ Kalmar (loan)	7	(0)
2025	→ KuPS (loan)	10	(1)
2025	→ Sandviken (loan)	6	(0)

International career^{‡}
2023–2024	Kosovo U21	5	(0)
- * Club domestic league appearances and goals as of 8 June 2026 ‡ National team caps and goals as of 12 September 2023

Dion Krasniqi (born 24 August 2003) is a professional footballer who plays as a forward for IF Elfsborg. Born in Sweden, he represents Kosovo internationally.

== Club career ==
=== Early career ===
Krasniqi started his career at his hometown club Eslövs BK, where then at the beginning of 2019, he was transferred to the youth team of Lunds BK. On 2 November 2019, he made his debut with senior team against Åtvidabergs FF, after coming on as a substitute in the 85th minute in place of Gustav Edén, and scored his side's second goal during a 2–2 away draw.

=== Varbergs BoIS ===
On 7 July 2022, Krasniqi signed a four-and-a-half-year contract with Allsvenskan club Varbergs BoIS. His debut with Varbergs BoIS came eleven days later in a 0–0 home draw against Helsingborgs IF after coming on as an 80th-minute substitute for André Boman.

== International career ==
On 15 September 2022, Krasniqi received a call-up from Kosovo U21 for a training camp held in Antalya, Turkey and for the hybrid friendly match against Greenland. His debut with Kosovo came eight days later in the hybrid friendly against Greenland where he scored his side's only goal during a 1–0 away win.

On 18 March 2023, Krasniqi received again a call-up from Kosovo U21 for the friendly matches against Moldova and Turkey. His official debut with Kosovo U21 came six days later in the friendly match against Moldova after coming on as a substitute in place of Ardit Tahiri.

== Career statistics ==
As of 18 June 2025

Appearances and goals by club, season and competition
Club	Season	League			National cup (Note: Includes Svenska Cupen and Suomen Cup)		Europe		Total	
Club	Season	Division	Apps	Goals	Apps	Goals	Apps	Goals	Apps	Goals
Lunds BK	2019	Swedish Division 1	1	1	–		–		1	1
Lunds BK	2021	Ettan	10	2	–		–		10	2
Lunds BK	2022	Ettan	14	3	2	0	–		16	3
Lunds BK	Total		25	6	2	0	0	0	27	6
Varbergs BoIS	2022	Allsvenskan	8	0	1	0	–		9	0
Varbergs BoIS	2023	Allsvenskan	23	6	1	0	–		24	6
Varbergs BoIS	Total		31	6	2	0	0	0	33	6
Elfsborg	2024	Allsvenskan	7	0	1	0	0	0	8	0
Kalmar (loan)	2024	Allsvenskan	7	0	1	0	–		8	0
KuPS (loan)	2025	Veikkausliiga	10	1	1	2	0	0	11	3
Sandviken (loan)	2025	Superettan	0	0	0	0	–		0	0
Career total			80	13	7	2	0	0	87	15
