= Charlie Weberg =

Swedish footballer

Personal information
- Date of birth: 22 May 1998 (age 28)
- Place of birth: Billeberga, Sweden
- Height: 1.85 m (6 ft 1 in)
- Position: Centre-back

Team information
- Current team: Ängelholms FF

Youth career
- Asmundtorps IF
- Billeberga GIF
- Häljarps IF
- Helsingborgs IF

Senior career*
Years	Team	Apps	(Gls)
2017–2023	Helsingborgs IF	106	(6)
2020	→ GAIS (loan)	29	(1)
2023	→ HB Køge (loan)	14	(0)
2024–2025	Trelleborgs FF	42	(0)
2026–	Ängelholms FF		
- * Club domestic league appearances and goals as of 3 December 2025

Charlie Weberg (born 22 May 1998) is a Swedish footballer who plays for Ängelholms FF.

== Career ==
=== Club career ===
After starting his career in Asmundtorps IF at the age of three, Weberg later moved to Billeberga GIF and Häljarps IF, before joining Helsingborgs IF when he was twelve years old.

He made his senior debut in Helsingborgs IF in a training match against Norwegian club Vålerenga on 23 June 2016. After being given playing time in training matches and in the Swedish Cup, he made his debut in the Superettan against GAIS on 22 April 2017. Just hours before his Superettan debut, Weberg signed his first senior contract with Helsingborg.

In February 2020, Weberg was loaned out to GAIS for the 2020 season. On transfer deadline day, 31 January 2023, Weberg was loaned out to Danish 1st Division club HB Køge until the end of June 2023.

On 5 January 2024, Weberg signed a two-year contract with Trelleborgs FF. After Trelleborg were relegated to the third tier, and his contract with Trelleborg expired, he moved on to Ängelholms FF on the same tier.
