= Marijan Ćosić =

Swedish footballer

Personal information
- Date of birth: 31 May 1996 (age 30)
- Place of birth: Lycksele, Sweden
- Height: 1.80 m (5 ft 11 in)
- Position: Striker

Team information
- Current team: FC Stockholm
- Number: 11

Youth career
- Alby IF
- –2015: Djurgårdens IF

Senior career*
Years	Team	Apps	(Gls)
2015	→ Huddinge IF (loan)		
2016–2017	Åtvidabergs FF	41	(1)
2018	Arameisk-Syrianska IF	29	(2)
2019–2020	IFK Haninge	54	(22)
2021–2024	IF Brommapojkarna	82	(27)
2024	Start	7	(0)
2024–	FC Stockholm	49	(5)

International career
2012–2013	Sweden U17	10	(0)
2016	Sweden U19	1	(0)
- * Club domestic league appearances and goals as of 16 November 2026

Marijan Ćosić (born 31 May 1996) is a Swedish footballer who plays as a forward for Ettan-Norra side FC Stockholm.

== Career ==
Ćosić started his youth career with local club Alby IF, and was picked up by one of the major Stockholm clubs Djurgårdens IF. Ćosić captained their youth teams, among others in the 2019 U19 Cup final which Djurgården lost to IFK Göteborg. He was also a Sweden youth international. He was not offered a senior contract at Djurgården and joined Åtvidabergs FF in the 2016 Superettan, prolonging his contract until the end of 2017.

He left Superettan for Division 1 club Arameisk-Syrianska IF in 2019, and took another step down to Division 2's IFK Haninge in 2019. However, Haninge won promotion, and Ćosić' goalscoring form started picking up in the 2020 Ettan, where he scored 18 league goals. As a reason for his success, he cited "hundreds of extra training sessions". He was nominated for the Ettan Midfielder of the Year award of 2020, which was ultimately bestowed upon Marko Nikolic.

Expressen wrote about significant interest from second-tier clubs, but Ćosić instead joined third-tier team IF Brommapojkarna. With BP he won back-to-back promotions from the 2021 Ettan and 2022 Superettan, reaching the 2023 Allsvenskan. Ćosić made his Allsvenskan debut against Djurgården in April 2023.

In March 2024, Ćosić joined Norwegian First Division club Start.

On 9 July 2024, Ćosić joined Ettan-Norra side FC Stockholm Internazionale.
