= FC Stockholm =

Swedish football club

- Full name: Football Club Stockholm Internazionale
- Nickname: FC Stockholm
- Founded: 22 October 2010; 16 years ago
- Stadium: Hammarby IP, Stockholm
- Capacity: 2,145
- Manager: Kiarash Livani
- League: Superettan
- 2026: Ettan Norra, 1st of 16 (Promoted)
- Website: https://www.fcsthlm.com

FC Stockholm Internazionale is a Swedish football club based in Stockholm. They set to play in Superettan, second tier of Swedish football from 2027 season after promotion from Ettan Norra in 2026.

The club was started in October 2010 and managed to go from Division 7 to Division 2 in 8 years and had 4 promotions in 4 years from 2010 to 2014.

The club is sponsored by billionaire (in Swedish kronor) Fredrik Wester.

In 2023, FC Stockholm hired Manuel Lindberg as senior adviser shortly after Lindberg left the role as director of sports at AIK. Ahead of the 2024 season, Rikard Norling was hired as manager. Former captain of the Norwegian first-tier team Aalesund, David Fällman, was brought on as a player.

In 2026, FC Stockholm Internazionale secure promotion to Superettan for the first time in their history from next season.

Former managers include Daniel Nannskog, Johan Mjällby and Rikard Norling.

== Honours ==
=== League ===
- Ettan Norra
  - Winners (1): 2026

== Players ==
=== Squad ===
As of 3 September 2026

Source: Note: Flags indicate national team as defined under FIFA eligibility rules; some limited exceptions apply. Players may hold more than one non-FIFA nationality.

No.	Pos.	Nation	Player
1	GK	SWE	Sixten Bringzén
3	DF	SWE	Swaibou Conta
5	DF	SWE	David Fällman
6	MF	SWE	Sebastian Loyola Nydén
7	FW	SWE	Michee Kabady Kantokoski
8	DF	SWE	Luka Dobrijevic
9	FW	SWE	Lukas Sunesson
10	FW	SWE	Marijan Ćosić
11	MF	SWE	Tiago Silva Sanchez
13	MF	SWE	David Zlotnik
14	FW	SWE	Matheo Canoilas
15	MF	SWE	Olle Edlund
16	MF	SWE	Oskar Jarde (on loan from Brommapojkarna)

No.	Pos.	Nation	Player
17	MF	SWE	Alexander Kärki
18	DF	SWE	Rasmus Allbäck
19	MF	SWE	Wille Turegård
20	FW	SWE	Olle Leonardsson (on loan from Degerfors)
21	FW	SWE	Othmane Salama
22	DF	SWE	Cesar Weilid
23	DF	SWE	David Tokpah
25	DF	SWE	Thomas Girma
26	MF	SWE	Ture Sahlin
27	DF	SYR	Ziad Ghanoum
30	GK	SWE	Simon Röse
35	GK	SWE	Chris Mankindu

== Staff ==
=== Current Staff ===
Position	Name
Head Coach	Kiarash Livani
Assistant Coach	Adam Larsson
Media coordinator	Anton Solem
Goalkeeping Coach	Rikard Strobl
Chairman	Simon Brännström
