= Ian Pettersson =

Swedish footballer

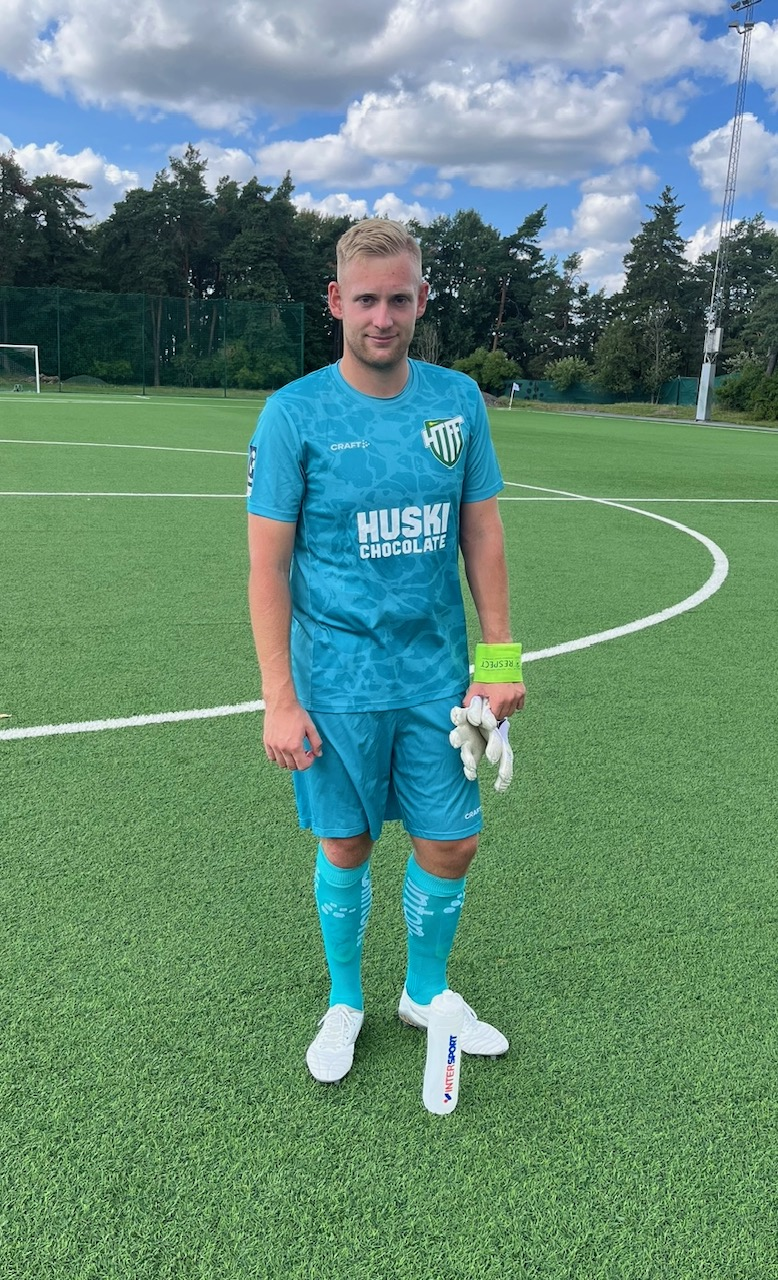

Personal information
- Date of birth: 21 July 2002 (age 24)
- Height: 1.86 m (6 ft 1 in)
- Position: Goalkeeper

Team information
- Current team: FC Rosengård
- Number: 1

Youth career
- Helsingborgs IF

Senior career*
| Years | Team | Apps | (Gls) |
| 2019–2020 | Helsingborgs IF | 5 | (0) |
| 2021 | Hammarby IF | 0 | (0) |
| 2021–2023 | Hammarby TFF | 19 | (0) |
| 2024- | FC Rosengård | 58 | (0) |
- * Club domestic league appearances and goals as of 24 November 2025

Ian Pettersson (born 21 July 2002) is a Swedish footballer who plays as a goalkeeper for FC Rosengård.
