= Anton Kurochkin =

Swedish footballer

Personal information
- Full name: Anton Kurochkin
- Date of birth: 20 July 2003 (age 23)
- Place of birth: Trollhättan, Sweden
- Height: 1.73 m (5 ft 8 in)
- Position: Attacking midfielder

Team information
- Current team: IF Brommapojkarna
- Number: 17

Youth career
- –2015: Skoftebyns IF
- 2016–2022: IFK Göteborg

Senior career*
Years	Team	Apps	(Gls)
2023	IFK Göteborg	0	(0)
2023	→ Varbergs BoIS (loan)	7	(0)
2024	Varbergs BoIS	29	(3)
2025–	IF Brommapojkarna	13	(3)
2025	→ GAIS (loan)	5	(0)
- * Club domestic league appearances and goals as of 11 November 2025

Anton Kurochkin (born 20 July 2003) is a Swedish footballer who plays as an attacking midfielder for IF Brommapojkarna .

Starting out in Skoftebyns IF, he debuted for IFK Göteborg in 2022, before being on loan to Varbergs BoIS for the 2023 season. In December 2023 it was confirmed he was signed on for Varberg until 2025.

In 2021 he underwent surgery for a tumor on his lower leg.
