= André Österholm =

Swedish footballer

Personal information
- Date of birth: 17 June 1996 (age 30)
- Place of birth: Stockholm, Sweden
- Height: 1.83 m (6 ft 0 in)
- Position: Midfielder

Youth career
- Enskede IK
- AFC Eskilstuna

Senior career*
Years	Team	Apps	(Gls)
2013	Athletic FC	13	(1)
2014–2016	AFC Eskilstuna	24	(1)
2015	→ Huddinge IF (loan)	1	(0)
2016–2017	Coruxo	14	(3)
2017	Villanovense	13	(0)
2018	Coruxo	12	(1)
2018–2019	Alondras	30	(6)
2019–2020	IK Sirius	3	(0)
2021	EIF	23	(3)
2022–2023	Östersund	55	(3)
2024	Næstved	7	(0)
2024	Asteras Petriti	10	(1)
- * Club domestic league appearances and goals as of 3 January 2025

André Österholm (born 17 June 1996) is a Swedish footballer. Besides Sweden, he has played in Spain, Finland and Greece.

== Club career ==
On 9 February 2022, Österholm signed a two-year contract with Östersund. Österholm scored three goals and made one assist in 29 league games in his last season for the club, before it was confirmed in December 2023, that he would leave Östersund at the end of the month, as his contract expired.

On April 13, 2024, Danish 1st Division club Næstved Boldklub confirmed that Österholm, after training with the club for some time, had signed a deal with Næstved. However, the club did not say how long a deal the Swede had signed. He left Næstved at the end of the season, which ended with relegation to the 2024-25 Danish 2nd Division.

On October 2, 2024, Österholm signed with Greek side Asteras Petriti in Gamma Ethniki. His versatility from defense to midfield and attack proved vital for the club, amassing 10 appearances and scoring 1 goal against Aiginiakos. However, in late December of the same year, his contract was terminated prematurely, due to the club's withdrawal from the division due to economic reasons.
