= Adnan Catic (footballer) =

Swedish footballer

Personal information
- Date of birth: 15 January 2000 (age 26)
- Place of birth: Sweden
- Position: Centre-back

Team information
- Current team: Örebro Syrianska
- Number: 41

Youth career
- –2014: Rynninge IK
- 2015–2017: BK Forward

Senior career*
Years	Team	Apps	(Gls)
2016–2019	BK Forward	46	(2)
2019–2020	AFC Eskilstuna	5	(0)
2020	Östersunds FK	0	(0)
2020	→ Ljungskile SK (loan)	4	(0)
2021–	Örebro Syrianska	40	(2)

International career
2019	Sweden U-19	1	(0)
- * Club domestic league appearances and goals as of 17:01, 28 December 2022 (UTC)

Adnan Catic (born 15 January 2000) is a Swedish footballer who plays for Örebro Syrianska IF.

He made his Allsvenskan debut for AFC Eskilstuna in 2019. In the summer of 2020 he moved to Östersunds FK, but after a loan to Ljungskile SK he was released at the end of 2020.
