= Fabio (footballer, born 1996) =

Brazilian footballer

Personal information
- Full name: Fabio de Sousa Silva
- Date of birth: 30 January 1996 (age 30)
- Place of birth: Brazil
- Position: Defender

Team information
- Current team: Trollhättan
- Number: 3

Senior career*
Years	Team	Apps	(Gls)
2016–2018	Örebro Syrianska IF		
2018–2022	Örebro SK	11	(0)
2020	→ Vasalunds IF (loan)	6	(1)
2021	→ Dalkurd FF (loan)	14	(2)
2023–	Trollhättan	39	(2)
- * Club domestic league appearances and goals as of 1 January 2025

Fabio de Sousa Silva (born 30 January 1996) is a Brazilian footballer who plays for Swedish club Trollhättan.
