= Johan Brattberg =

Swedish footballer (born 1996)

Personal information
- Date of birth: 28 December 1996 (age 29)
- Place of birth: Sweden
- Height: 1.98 m (6 ft 6 in)
- Position: Goalkeeper

Team information
- Current team: Helsingborgs IF
- Number: 1

Youth career
- Falkenbergs FF

Senior career*
Years	Team	Apps	(Gls)
2017–2020	Falkenbergs FF	28	(0)
2016	→ Eskilsminne IF (loan)	4	(0)
2016–2018	→ Ullareds IK (loan)	33	(0)
2021–2024	BK Häcken	3	(0)
2021	→ Falkenbergs FF (loan)	1	(0)
2022	→ Utsikten (loan)	14	(0)
2024	Västerås SK	15	(0)
2025–	Helsingborgs IF	48	(0)
- * Club domestic league appearances and goals as of 12 November 2026

Johan Brattberg (born 28 December 1996) is a Swedish footballer who plays for Helsingborgs IF.

== Club career ==
Brattberg began his footballing career with his hometown club Falkenbergs FF. In February 2016, he was loaned out to Eskilsminne IF. Later that year, in August 2016, he joined Ullareds IK on another loan deal. From 2016 to 2018, he made regular appearances for Ullareds IK while also being named on the bench for Falkenbergs FF in several matches. He made his Superettan debut for Falkenbergs FF on 22 October 2017 in a 1–1 draw against Östers IF.

In February 2021, Brattberg signed a two-year contract with BK Häcken. However, he was immediately loaned back to Falkenbergs FF on a deal lasting until the summer. In January 2022, he was loaned to Superettan side Utsiktens BK for the remainder of the season. In July 2022, Brattberg was recalled by BK Häcken and simultaneously extended his contract through the 2024 season. He made two Allsvenskan appearances in 2022 as BK Häcken secured their first-ever Swedish championship title.

In February 2024, Brattberg joined Västerås SK on a two-year deal. However, already at the end of the year, on 30 December 2024, he signed for Helsingborgs IF on a three-year deal.

Ahead of the 2025 season, he signed with Helsingborgs IF.

== Honours ==
BK Häcken

- Allsvenskan: 2022
- Svenska cupen: 2023
