= Ängelholms FF =

Swedish football club

- Full name: Ängelholms Fotbollförening
- Founded: 1976; 50 years ago
- Ground: Ängelholms IP, Ängelholm
- Capacity: 4,000
- Chairman: Mats Johansson
- Head coach: Roar Hansen
- League: Ettan Fotboll
- 2025: Ettan Södra, 9th of 16
- Website: http://www.angelholmsff.se/
Home colours	Away colours

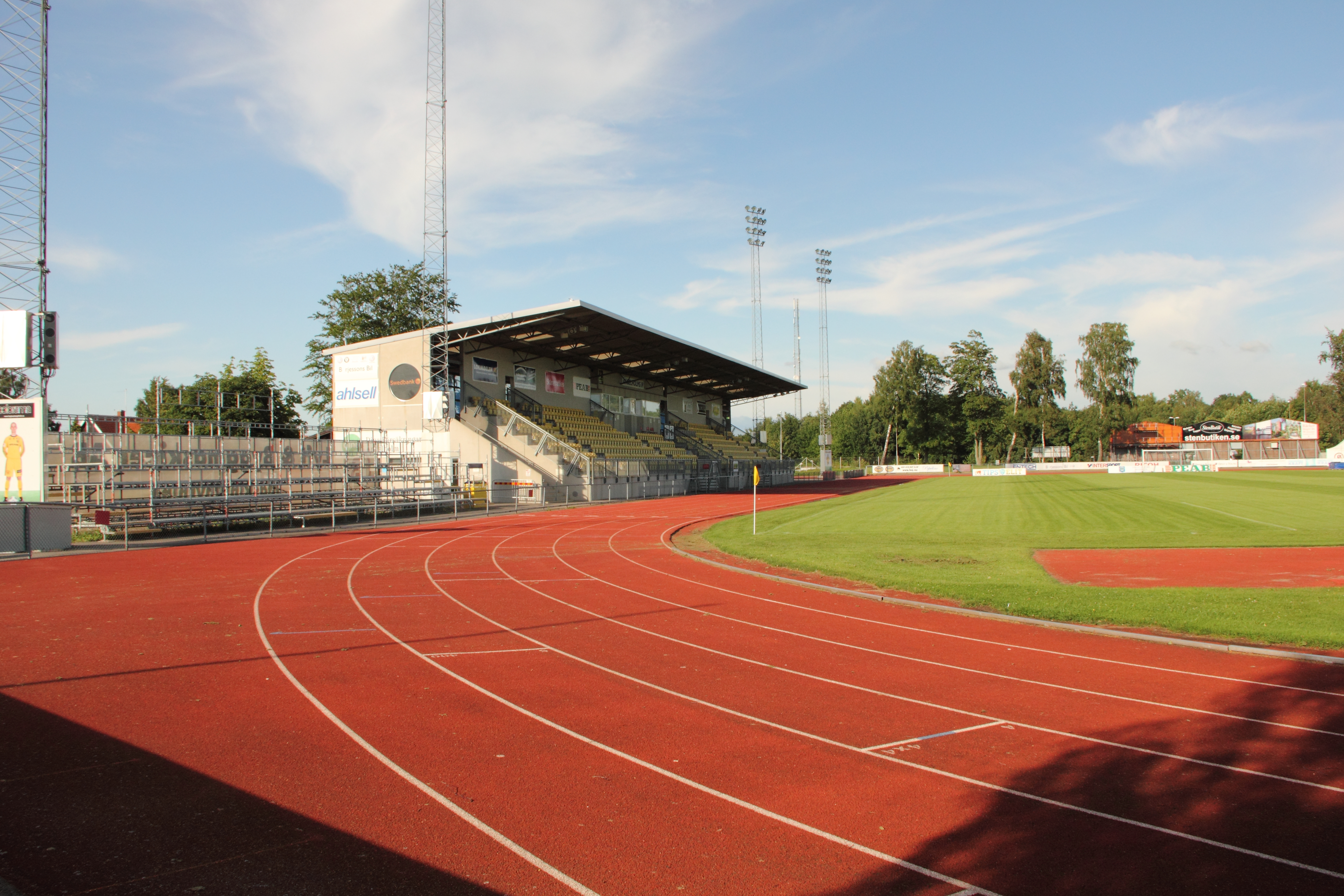
Ängelholms IP

Ängelholms FF is a football club based in Ängelholm, Sweden. The club is affiliated to Skånes Fotbollförbund and play their home games at Ängelholms IP. The club was formed in 1976 as a merger between Ängelholms IF and Skörpinge GIF. The club plays in Division 1, the third highest tier of Swedish football.

== History ==
Ängelholms IF were founded in 1905 and Skörpinge GIF were founded in 1950. Ängelholms IF had their most successful period in the 1930s when they played in Swedish Division 2 against clubs such as Malmö FF, Halmstads BK and Helsingborgs IF. Ängelholms IF were the most successful club in Ängelholm until Skörpinge GIF were founded and later seriously started to compete for the best talents of the town.

Discussions of a possible merger initiated in 1975 after the two clubs realised the potential in a merger. Both clubs realised that the best opportunity for Ängelholm to have a professional club would be to merge the two clubs. They merged in 1976 and founded Ängelholms FF. However the success that the two clubs had in vision took until the 1990s to aspire. Between 1997 and 2001, Ängelholms FF were promoted from Division 4 to the second highest tier, Superettan. The club was relegated back to Division 2 and played there until they were promoted to the newly created tier three, Division 1. The club was once again promoted in their second season of the league and found themselves in Superettan for the second time in the club's history. In 2008 the club reached their highest position in the Swedish league system yet, 5th place in Superettan.

On 22 December 2016 the club applied for bankruptcy. However, on 17 January 2017, it was announced that the club had been saved from bankruptcy.

== Players ==
=== First-team squad ===
As of 1 September 2026

Note: Flags indicate national team as defined under FIFA eligibility rules; some limited exceptions apply. Players may hold more than one non-FIFA nationality.

No.	Pos.	Nation	Player
1	GK	SWE	Robin Streifert
2	DF	SWE	Mohammad Ahmadi
3	DF	SWE	Eric Vedholm
4	DF	SWE	William Sonntag
5	DF	SWE	Benjamin Hasselqvist
6	DF	SWE	Charlie Weberg
7	FW	SWE	Adam Touray
8	MF	SWE	Benjamin Tannus
9	FW	SWE	Anton Nilsson
10	FW	SWE	Marcly Tshikupe
11	FW	SWE	Tim Amilon Persson
14	MF	SWE	Vilgot Carlsson
15	DF	SWE	Arvid Wiklund

No.	Pos.	Nation	Player
16	DF	SWE	Melvin Ahlqvist
17	DF	GHA	Thomas Boakye
18	MF	SWE	Melker Tågsjö
19	MF	SWE	Diego Alfonsi
20	FW	SWE	Elion Lipovica
21	FW	SWE	Ebbe Orrling
23	MF	SWE	Oliver Stojanovic Fredin
24	MF	SWE	Endrit Lipovica
25	DF	SWE	Jacob Svensson
27	DF	SWE	Ludvig Lööw
28	MF	SWE	Pelle Svorén
30	GK	SWE	Zackarias Nilsson

=== Retired numbers ===
12 – Daniel Johansson, defender (1996–2009)

== Achievements ==
=== League ===
- Division 2 Västra Götaland:
