= Husqvarna FF =

Swedish football club

- Full name: Husqvarna Fotbollförening
- Short name: HFF
- Founded: 3 February 1987; 39 years ago
- Ground: Vapenvallen, Huskvarna
- Capacity: 4,000
- Chairman: Stefan Axelsson
- Head coach: Benjamin Westman
- League: Ettan Södra
- 2025: Ettan Södra, 15th of 16
- Website: www.husqvarnaff.se
Home colours	Away colours

Husqvarna FF is a football club in Huskvarna, Sweden. The team is sponsored by the Husqvarna AB.

== History ==
Husqvarna FF was founded on 3 February 1987 following the merger of the men's association football sections of Husqvarna IF and Huskvarna Södra IS. In its early years the new club played in Divisions 2 and 3. The club's fortunes improved in 1998 when the club finished with nine points ahead of Myresjö IF to win Division 2 Östra Götaland and gain promotion to Division 1 Södra, the second tier of Swedish football. However their stay in Division 1 was short-lived and they were relegated at the end of the 1999 season.

Since 2006 the club has been playing in Division 1 Södra which is now the third tier of the Swedish football league system except the 2012 season when they played in Division 2 Östra Götaland. In 2013, they were promoted to Superettan which is the second tier in Swedish football.

== Notable coaches ==
- Glenn Ståhl (2009–2010)
- Niclas Tagesson (2011–present)

== Season to season ==
Season	Level	Division	Section	Position	Movements
1993	Tier 3	Division 2	Östra Götaland	4th	
1994	Tier 3	Division 2	Östra Götaland	2nd	
1995	Tier 3	Division 2	Östra Götaland	5th	
1996	Tier 3	Division 2	Östra Götaland	6th	
1997	Tier 3	Division 2	Östra Götaland	3rd	
1998	Tier 3	Division 2	Östra Götaland	1st	Promoted
1999	Tier 2	Division 1	Södra	11th	Relegated
2000	Tier 3	Division 2	Östra Götaland	4th	
2001	Tier 3	Division 2	Östra Götaland	7th	
2002	Tier 3	Division 2	Östra Götaland	1st	Promotion Playoffs
2003	Tier 3	Division 2	Östra Götaland	2nd	
2004	Tier 3	Division 2	Östra Götaland	1st	Promotion Playoffs
2005	Tier 3	Division 2	Mellersta Götaland	4th	Promoted
2006*	Tier 3	Division 1	Södra	5th	
2007	Tier 3	Division 1	Södra	9th	
2008	Tier 3	Division 1	Södra	11th	
2009	Tier 3	Division 1	Södra	6th	
2010	Tier 3	Division 1	Södra	11th	
2011	Tier 3	Division 1	Södra	13th	Relegated
2012	Tier 4	Division 2	Östra Götaland	1st	Promoted
2013	Tier 3	Division 1	Södra	1st	Promoted
2014	Tier 2	Superettan		16th	Relegated
2015	Tier 3	Division 1	Södra	11th	
2016	Tier 3	Division 1	Södra	6th	
2017	Tier 3	Division 1	Södra	10th	
2018	Tier 3	Division 1	Södra	16th	Relegated
2019	Tier 4	Division 2	Östra Götaland	3rd	

* League restructuring in 2006 resulted in a new division being created at Tier 3 and subsequent divisions dropping a level.

== Current squad ==
As of 31 August 2025

Note: Flags indicate national team as defined under FIFA eligibility rules; some limited exceptions apply. Players may hold more than one non-FIFA nationality.

No.	Pos.	Nation	Player
1	GK	SWE	Manne Eriksson
2	DF	SWE	Fredrik Cårebo
3	DF	SWE	Adam Hansson
4	DF	SWE	Benjamin Omerovic
5	DF	SWE	Anton Vukasovic
6	DF	SWE	Alex Petrovic
7	MF	SWE	Noel Sernelius (on loan from IFK Norrköping)
8	MF	SWE	Benjamin Lindblad
9	FW	SWE	Adam Rubin
10	FW	SWE	Edin Hamidović
11	MF	SWE	William Svefors
12	FW	SWE	Simon Adjei

No.	Pos.	Nation	Player
13	DF	SWE	Abdiqafar Ahmed Arab
14	MF	SWE	William Lind
15	DF	SWE	Adam Lindström Leister
17	MF	SWE	Emirhan Gecer
18	FW	SWE	William Rubendahl
19	DF	SWE	Klevis Galabri
22	FW	SWE	Fred Božičević (on loan from IFK Värnamo)
23	FW	ENG	Ayomide Jibodu
27	DF	SWE	Antonio Jankulovski
28	MF	SWE	Svante Svedin
30	GK	SWE	Patric Freijd
33	GK	SRB	Vilson Caković

=== Out on loan ===
Note: Flags indicate national team as defined under FIFA eligibility rules; some limited exceptions apply. Players may hold more than one non-FIFA nationality.

No.	Pos.	Nation	Player
—	FW	SWE	Victor Rotviker (at IF Haga until 30 November 2025)
20	MF	SWE	Abdirasaq Ahmed Arab (at IF Haga until 30 November 2025)

== Management ==
=== Technical staff ===
As of 13 April 2017

Name	Role
(Sweden) Benjamin Westman	Head coach
(Sweden) Zoran Petrovic	Assistant manager

== Achievements ==
=== League ===
- Division 1 Södra
  - Champions (1): 2013

== Footnotes ==
A Current youth players who at least have sat on the bench in a competitive match.
