= Jonathan Tamimi =

Jordanian footballer

Personal information
- Full name: Jonathan Tamimi Syberg
- Date of birth: 12 October 1994 (age 32)
- Place of birth: Sweden
- Height: 1.78 m (5 ft 10 in)
- Position: Right-back

Youth career
- 1999–2012: Hammarby IF

Senior career*
Years	Team	Apps	(Gls)
2013–2015	Hammarby IF	7	(0)
2015–2017	Jönköpings Södra	44	(0)
2018–2019	GIF Sundsvall	59	(1)
2020	Mjällby AIF	20	(0)
2021	Degerfors	18	(0)
2022–2023	Brage	58	(2)
2024	Al-Hussein		
2024	Kauno Žalgiris	13	(0)

International career^{‡}
2013	Sweden U19	2	(0)
2017–2018	Jordan	5	(0)
- * Club domestic league appearances and goals as of 11 November 2024 ‡ National team caps and goals as of 15 January 2020

Jonathan Tamimi Syberg (born 12 October 1994) is a professional footballer who plays as a right-back. Born in Sweden, he represents Jordan internationally.

== International career ==
Tamimi debuted for the Jordan national football team in a friendly 1–1 tie with Libya on 25 December 2017.

== Honours ==
=== Club ===
Hammarby IF

- Superettan (1): 2014

Jönköpings Södra

- Superettan (1): 2015
