= IFK Öxnehaga =

Swedish sports club

- Full name: Idrottsföreningen kamraterna Öxnehaga
- Sport: soccer
- Founded: 10 April 1955
- Team history: IFK Huskvarna (1955–?)
- Based in: Huskvarna, Sweden
- Ballpark: Öxnehaga IP

IFK Öxnehaga is a sports club in Öxnehaga in Huskvarna, Sweden, established on 10 April 1955 as IFK Huskvarna.

The women's soccer team played in the Swedish second division during the late 1990s and the early 2000s.

When IFK Jönköping was disbanded in time for the 1998 season, the activity was transferred to IFK Öxnehaga.

In 1999, the club won both the Småland women's and girls' district championship.
