= List of Swedish football transfers winter 2022–23 =

This is a list of Swedish football transfers for the 2022–23 winter transfer window. Only transfers featuring Allsvenskan are listed.

== Allsvenskan ==
Note: Flags indicate national team as has been defined under FIFA eligibility rules. Players may hold more than one non-FIFA nationality.

=== Häcken ===
In:

No.	Pos.	Nation	Player
9	FW	NOR	Ola Kamara (free agent)
13	DF	SWE	Simon Sandberg (from Hammarby)
16	MF	SWE	Pontus Dahbo (promoted from junior squad)
30	GK	SWE	Sebastian Banozic (promoted from junior squad)
31	DF	SWE	Charlie Axede (promoted from junior squad)
35	DF	SWE	Sigge Jansson (promoted from junior squad)
38	FW	SWE	William Nilsson (promoted from junior squad)
40	FW	SWE	Anomnachi Chidi (promoted from junior squad)

Out:

No.	Pos.	Nation	Player
8	MF	SWE	Erik Friberg (retired)
9	FW	SWE	Alexander Jeremejeff (to (Greece) Panathinaikos)
33	DF	SWE	Sebastian Lagerlund (to Utsikten)
—	MF	BIH	Semir Bosnic (on loan to Norrby)
—	MF	NOR	Tobias Heintz (to (Bulgaria) CSKA Sofia, previously on loan at (Norway) Sarpsborg)
—	MF	SWE	Alexander Faltsetas (to Utsikten, previously on loan at Helsingborg)
—	MF	SWE	William Milovanovic (to (Slovenia) Koper, previously on loan at Utsikten)
—	FW	FIN	Jasse Tuominen (to (Finland) KuPS, previously on loan at (Norway) Tromsø)
—	FW	SWE	Leonardo Farah Shahin (to Falkenberg, previously on loan at Qviding)
—	DF	CIV	Yannick Adjoumani (to (Ivory Coast) ASEC Mimosas, previously on loan at Östersund)

=== Djurgården ===
In:

No.	Pos.	Nation	Player
11	FW	NOR	Oliver Berg (from Kalmar)
12	DF	SWE	Theo Bergvall (from Brommapojkarna)
15	FW	SWE	Oskar Fallenius (from (Denmark) Brøndby)
17	DF	ESP	Carlos Moros Gracia (from Mjällby)
18	FW	SWE	Jacob Bergström (from Mjällby)
20	MF	SWE	Isak Alemayehu (promoted from junior squad)
21	MF	SWE	Lucas Bergvall (from Brommapojkarna)
22	MF	SWE	Wilmer Odefalk (from Brommapojkarna)

Out:

No.	Pos.	Nation	Player
3	DF	SWE	Hjalmar Ekdal (to (England) Burnley)
11	FW	ALB	Albion Ademi (on loan to Värnamo)
12	MF	ZAM	Emmanuel Banda (to (Croatia) Rijeka)
15	GK	RUS	Aleksandr Vasyutin (loan return to (Russia) Zenit)
17	FW	SWE	Kalle Holmberg (to (Malta) Ħamrun Spartans)
25	MF	MLI	Amadou Doumbouya (to (Russia) Kuban Krasnodar)
—	DF	KEN	Frank Odhiambo (on loan to Vasalund, previously on loan at Haninge)
—	DF	SWE	Axel Wallenborg (on loan to (Denmark) AB, previously on loan at Brommapojkarna)
—	GK	SWE	David Celic (to J-Södra, previously on loan at Karlberg)
—	DF	SWE	Linus Tagesson (to Örgryte, previously on loan at Täby)
—	MF	SWE	Mattias Mitku (to Eskilstuna, previously on loan at Karlstad)

=== Hammarby ===
In:

No.	Pos.	Nation	Player
3	DF	SWE	Anton Kralj (from Degerfors)
5	MF	SWE	Tesfaldet Tekie (from (Netherlands) Go Ahead Eagles)
7	FW	MNE	Viktor Đukanović (from (Montenegro) Budućnost)
9	MF	BIH	Adi Nalić (from Malmö)
17	MF	NOR	August Mikkelsen (from (Norway) Tromsø)
21	DF	SWE	Simon Strand (from Elfsborg)
31	FW	CMR	Saidou Alioum (from (Cameroon) Sahel, previously on loan)
39	MF	TUR	İsak Vural (on loan from (Turkey) Fenerbahçe)
48	MF	GUI	Ibrahima Breze Fofana (from Hammarby TFF)
—	MF	NIG	Moustapha Amadou Sabo (from (Niger) Sonidep)

Out:

No.	Pos.	Nation	Player
2	DF	SWE	Simon Sandberg (to Häcken)
4	DF	SWE	Richard Magyar (retired)
5	DF	IRQ	Mohanad Jeahze (to (United States) DC United)
6	MF	SWE	Darijan Bojanić (to (South Korea) Ulsan Hyundai)
8	MF	DEN	Jeppe Andersen (to (Norway) Sarpsborg)
9	FW	NOR	Veton Berisha (to (Norway) Molde)
16	FW	SWE	Gustav Ludwigson (to (South Korea) Ulsan Hyundai)
17	MF	ESP	David Concha (retired)
29	FW	CIV	Bayéré Junior Loué (on loan to (Turkey) Göztepe)
—	MF	NIG	Moustapha Amadou Sabo (on loan to Hammarby TFF)

=== Kalmar ===
In:

No.	Pos.	Nation	Player
9	FW	DEN	Mileta Rajović (from (Denmark) Næstved)
19	MF	FIN	Saku Ylätupa (from Sundsvall)
23	MF	SWE	Robert Gojani (from (Denmark) Silkeborg)
26	DF	SWE	Arash Motaraghebjafarpour (from Dalkurd)
57	DF	SWE	Arvin Davoudi-Kia (from Malmö youth)
—	FW	TUR	Deniz Hümmet (from (Turkey) Çaykur Rizespor)

Out:

No.	Pos.	Nation	Player
10	MF	SWE	Filip Sachpekidis (to (Greece) Levadiakos)
12	MF	SWE	Sebastian Nanasi (loan return to Malmö)
16	DF	SWE	Adnan Kojic (free agent)
19	MF	SWE	Lukas Rhöse (to Skövde)
20	FW	NOR	Oliver Berg (to Djurgården)
23	DF	SWE	Johan Stenmark (to Trelleborg)
26	MF	SWE	Victor Backman (to Örebro)
27	FW	SEN	Papa Diouf (to (Italy) Brindisi)
—	FW	SWE	Edvin Crona (on loan to Oskarshamn, previously on loan at Åtvidaberg)
—	FW	BRA	Maxwell (on loan to (Brazil) Chapecoense, previously on loan at (Brazil) Guarani)

=== AIK ===
In:

No.	Pos.	Nation	Player
7	MF	DEN	Viktor Fischer (on loan from (Belgium) Antwerp)
9	FW	SWE	Omar Faraj (from (Spain) Atlético Levante, previously on loan at Degerfors)
16	DF	FIN	Robin Tihi (loan return from Värnamo)
18	MF	SWE	Abdihakim Ali (from Vasalund)
21	MF	SWE	Jimmy Durmaz (free agent)
22	MF	CIV	Aboubakar Keita (from (Belgium) Charleroi, previously on loan at (Israel) Sektzia Ness Ziona)
31	MF	NGA	Abdussalam Magashy (from Värnamo)
32	DF	POR	Rui Modesto (from (Finland) Honka)
44	MF	SWE	Elias Durmaz (from Vasalund)
47	FW	SWE	Alexander Fesshaie (promoted from junior squad)

Out:

No.	Pos.	Nation	Player
2	DF	SWE	Joe Mendes (to (Portugal) Braga)
3	DF	SWE	Per Karlsson (retired)
7	MF	SWE	Sebastian Larsson (retired)
9	FW	ARG	Nicolás Stefanelli (to (United States) Inter Miami)
10	FW	SWE	Nabil Bahoui (to Qatar SC)
14	DF	SWE	Lucas Forsberg (to Sundsvall, previously on loan at Sollentuna)
22	FW	SWE	Benjamin Mbunga Kimpioka (on loan to (Switzerland) Luzern)
24	DF	GAM	Jesper Ceesay (to Norrköping)
26	MF	SWE	Yasin Ayari (to (England) Brighton & Hove Albion)
29	DF	KEN	Collins Sichenje (on loan to (Finland) KuPS)
30	FW	KEN	Henry Atola (on loan to Norrby)
33	DF	SWE	Mikael Lustig (retired)
34	FW	SWE	Erik Ring (on loan to Helsingborg)
—	GK	SWE	Samuel Brolin (on loan to (Denmark) Horsens, previously on loan at Mjällby)
—	DF	SWE	Rasmus Bonde (on loan to (Norway) Hødd, previously on loan at Vasalund)
—	DF	SYR	Ahmad Faqa (on loan to (Iceland) HK, previously on loan at Sandviken)
—	FW	SWE	Calvin Kabuye (on loan to Östersund, previously on loan at Vasalund)
—	GK	DEN	Jakob Haugaard (to (Norway) Tromsø, previously on loan)
—	MF	SWE	Tom Strannegård (to (Norway) Start, previously on loan)

=== Elfsborg ===
In:

No.	Pos.	Nation	Player
1	GK	SWE	Melker Uppenberg (from Eskilstuna)
2	DF	SWE	Gustaf Lagerbielke (loan return from Degerfors)
21	MF	SWE	André Boman (from Varberg)
25	FW	SWE	Jack Cooper-Love (loan return from Skövde)

Out:

No.	Pos.	Nation	Player
5	DF	GAM	Maudo Jarjué (on loan to (Slovakia) Slovan Bratislava)
14	FW	NOR	Oscar Aga (to (Norway) Rosenborg)
15	DF	FIN	Leo Väisänen (to (United States) Austin)
20	DF	SWE	Simon Strand (to Hammarby)
21	MF	SWE	Rasmus Alm (to (United States) St. Louis City)
—	FW	SWE	Prince Isaac Kouame (to (Norway) Brattvåg, previously on loan at Skövde)

=== Malmö ===
In:

No.	Pos.	Nation	Player
2	DF	SWE	Anton Tinnerholm (from (United States) New York City)
19	DF	CAN	Derek Cornelius (from (Canada) Vancouver Whitecaps, previously on loan at (Greece) Panetolikos)
21	FW	SWE	Stefano Vecchia (from (Norway) Rosenborg)
22	MF	SWE	Taha Ali (from Helsingborg)
25	DF	BRA	Gabriel Busanello (from (Brazil) Chapecoense, previously on loan at (Ukraine) Dnipro-1)

Out:

No.	Pos.	Nation	Player
7	MF	MKD	Erdal Rakip (to (Turkey) Antalyaspor)
11	FW	SWE	Ola Toivonen (retired)
14	DF	SWE	Felix Beijmo (on loan to (Denmark) AGF)
18	MF	USA	Romain Gall (to (Serbia) Mladost Novi Sad)
21	DF	BIH	Dennis Hadžikadunić (loan return to (Russia) Rostov)
22	MF	BIH	Adi Nalić (to Hammarby)
23	DF	CZE	Matěj Chaluš (on loan to (Netherlands) Groningen)
32	MF	NOR	Jo Inge Berget (free agent)
33	FW	SLE	Mohamed Buya Turay (free agent)
39	GK	SWE	Viktor Andersson (on loan to Lund)
—	GK	SWE	Mathias Nilsson (on loan to Örgryte, previously on loan at Öster)
—	DF	SWE	André Álvarez Pérez (on loan to Olympic)
—	MF	SWE	Mubaarak Nuh (on loan to Örgryte, previously on loan at Olympic)
—	MF	SWE	David Edvardsson (on loan to Landskrona, previously on loan at Värnamo)
—	MF	SWE	August Karlin (on loan to J-Södra, previously on loan at Olympic)
—	MF	SWE	Peter Gwargis (on loan to Degerfors, previously on loan at J-Södra)
—	DF	SWE	Noah Eile (reloan to Mjällby)
—	FW	SWE	Samuel Burakovsky (reloan to Olympic)
—	FW	GHA	Malik Abubakari (on loan to (Slovakia) Slovan Bratislava, previously on loan at (Finland) HJK)
—	DF	MLI	Ismaël Sidibé (to (Luxembourg) Dudelange, previously on loan at Olympic)
—	MF	SWE	Samuel Adrian (to J-Södra, previously on loan)
—	MF	SWE	Amel Mujanic (to Örgryte, previously on loan at (Cyprus) APOEL)
—	MF	SWE	Melker Widell (to Landskrona, previously on loan at Olympic)
—	MF	SWE	Markus Björkqvist (to Trelleborg, previously on loan at Utsikten)

=== Göteborg ===
In:

No.	Pos.	Nation	Player
5	DF	SWE	Sebastian Ohlsson (free agent)
6	MF	NOR	Anders Trondsen (free agent)
8	MF	NOR	Elias Kristoffersen Hagen (from (Norway) Bodø/Glimt)
15	DF	DEN	Sebastian Hausner (from (Denmark) AGF)
19	DF	SWE	Adam Carlén (from Degerfors)

Out:

No.	Pos.	Nation	Player
1	GK	SUR	Warner Hahn (to (Japan) Kyoto Sanga)
4	DF	SWE	Carl Johansson (on loan to (Denmark) Randers)
8	MF	SYR	Hosam Aiesh (to (South Korea) Seoul)
11	FW	EST	Erik Sorga (to (Bulgaria) Lokomotiv Plovdiv)
15	FW	SWE	Alfons Nygaard (to Tvååker)
21	MF	SWE	Simon Thern (to Värnamo)
26	DF	NED	Tim van Assema (to Tvååker)
29	FW	NGA	Saidu Salisu (loan return to (Nigeria) Kano Pillars)
30	DF	SWE	Mattias Bjärsmyr (retired)
31	GK	SWE	Gustav Lillienberg (to Falkenberg)
—	MF	SWE	Johannes Selvén (on loan to Örgryte)
—	MF	IRQ	Amir Al-Ammari (on loan to Halmstad, previously on loan at Mjällby)

=== Mjällby ===
In:

No.	Pos.	Nation	Player
3	DF	SWE	Arvid Brorsson (from Örgryte)
4	DF	SWE	Noah Eile (reloan from Malmö)
5	DF	NOR	Colin Rösler (from (Norway) Lillestrøm)
6	MF	SWE	Imam Jagne (free agent)
9	FW	DEN	Max Fenger (on loan from (Denmark) OB)
16	FW	SWE	Alexander Johansson (from Varberg)
17	MF	SWE	Elliot Stroud (from Oddevold)
23	FW	CHN	Afrden Asqer (on loan from (China) Guangzhou)
24	DF	SWE	Tom Pettersson (from (Norway) Lillestrøm)
26	MF	SWE	Noah Persson (on loan from (Switzerland) Young Boys)
35	GK	SWE	Alexander Lundin (from Brommapojkarna)

Out:

No.	Pos.	Nation	Player
5	DF	KOS	Jetmir Haliti (loan return to AIK)
8	MF	GHA	Enoch Kofi Adu (to (Finland) Ekenäs)
16	FW	SWE	Jacob Bergström (to Djurgården)
17	DF	ESP	Carlos Moros Gracia (to Djurgården)
20	MF	IRQ	Amir Al-Ammari (loan return to Göteborg)
23	MF	SWE	Andreas Blomqvist (free agent)
24	FW	SWE	Heradi Rashidi (free agent)
26	MF	SWE	Noah Persson (to (Switzerland) Young Boys)
30	GK	SWE	Samuel Brolin (loan return to AIK)
—	FW	SWE	Taylor Silverholt (on loan to Jönköping Södra, previously on loan at Falkenberg)

=== Värnamo ===
In:

No.	Pos.	Nation	Player
3	DF	SWE	Viktor Bergh (from Norrby)
8	FW	ALB	Albion Ademi (on loan from Djurgården)
14	FW	SWE	Gustav Engvall (from (Belgium) Mechelen, previously on loan at (Norway) Sarpsborg)
19	MF	CAN	Marco Bustos (from (Canada) Pacific FC)
22	MF	SWE	Simon Thern (from Göteborg)
24	DF	SWE	Emin Grozdanic (from GAIS)

Out:

No.	Pos.	Nation	Player
2	DF	NZL	Francis de Vries (to (New Zealand) Eastern Suburbs)
3	DF	FIN	Robin Tihi (loan return to AIK)
14	FW	SWE	Marcus Antonsson (to (Saudi Arabia) Al-Adalah)
15	DF	SWE	Felix Wennergrund (to Oskarshamn)
21	MF	NGA	Abdussalam Magashy (to AIK)
24	MF	SWE	Moonga Simba (loan return to (Norway) Brann)
32	MF	SWE	David Edvardsson (loan return to Malmö)
—	GK	SWE	Hampus Gustafsson (on loan to Norrby, previously on loan at Åtvidaberg)
—	FW	SWE	Haris Avdiu (to Karlstad, previously on loan at Östersund)
—	FW	SWE	Victor Andersson (free agent, previously on loan at Ljungskile)

=== Sirius ===
In:

No.	Pos.	Nation	Player
19	MF	SWE	Melker Heier (from Landskrona)
22	MF	SWE	André Alsanati (from Eskilstuna)
28	FW	DEN	Magnus Kaastrup (on loan from (Denmark) Lyngby)
30	GK	SWE	Jakob Tånnander (from (Finland) HJK)

Out:

No.	Pos.	Nation	Player
2	MF	SWE	Adam Hellborg (to Helsingborg)
3	DF	SWE	Karl Larson (free agent)
7	MF	SWE	Filip Rogić (to (Thailand) Buriram United)
8	DF	SWE	Tim Björkström (to (Norway) Fredrikstad)
10	MF	JPN	Yukiya Sugita (to (Iran) Foolad)
19	FW	FIN	Antonio Yakoub (loan return to Assyriska)
34	GK	SWE	Tommi Vaiho (loan return to Djurgården)
36	DF	SWE	Noel Hansson (free agent)
—	MF	SWE	Samuel Wikman (to Dalkurd, previously on loan at Umeå)

=== Norrköping ===
In:

No.	Pos.	Nation	Player
2	DF	NOR	Niklas Gunnarsson (from (Norway) Strømsgodset)
3	DF	DEN	Marcus Baggesen (from (Denmark) Silkeborg youth)
6	DF	SWE	Isak Ssewankambo (free agent)
10	MF	DEN	Vito Hammershøy-Mistrati (from (Romania) Cluj)
14	DF	SWE	Yahya Kalley (on loan from (Netherlands) Groningen)
16	MF	SWE	Elvis Lindkvist (free agent)
19	FW	DEN	Victor Lind (on loan from (Denmark) Midtjylland, previously on loan at (Norway) HamKam)
21	DF	GAM	Jesper Ceesay (from AIK)
45	FW	SWE	Emil Roback (on loan from (Italy) Milan, previously on loan at (Denmark) Nordsjælland)

Out:

No.	Pos.	Nation	Player
2	DF	NGA	Godswill Ekpolo (to (Cyprus) Apollon Limassol)
6	DF	SWE	Linus Wahlqvist (to (Poland) Pogoń Szczecin)
10	MF	SWE	Jonathan Levi (to (Hungary) Puskás Akadémia)
14	DF	ALB	Egzon Binaku (to GAIS)
16	DF	SWE	Viktor Agardius (to Brommapojkarna)
21	DF	SWE	Dino Salihovic (on loan to GAIS)
27	MF	ISL	Jóhannes Kristinn Bjarnason (to (Iceland) KR)
29	GK	SWE	Julius Lindgren (on loan to Trollhättan)
31	DF	SWE	Edvin Tellgren (on loan to Sylvia)
33	FW	SWE	Darrell Kamdem Tibell (on loan to Skövde)
39	DF	SWE	Theodore Rask (on loan to Östersund)
—	DF	ISL	Oliver Stefánsson (to (Iceland) Breiðablik, previously on loan at (Iceland) ÍA)
—	FW	SWE	Emanuel Chabo (to Åtvidaberg, previously on loan at Sylvia)

=== Degerfors ===
In:

No.	Pos.	Nation	Player
1	GK	NOR	Sondre Rossbach (on loan from (Norway) Odd, previously on loan at (Norway) Vålerenga)
3	DF	SWE	Abdelkarim Mammar Chaouche (from Eskilstuna)
9	FW	SWE	Gustav Lindgren (from Sollentuna)
14	FW	NGA	Fortune Bassey (on loan from (Hungary) Ferencváros, previously on loan at (Czech Republic) Viktoria Plzeň)
15	DF	LUX	Seid Korac (from (Denmark) Esbjerg, previously on loan at (Cyprus) Akritas Chlorakas)
17	MF	SWE	Carl Ljungberg (promoted from junior squad)
19	MF	CRO	Damjan Pavlović (on loan from (Croatia) Rijeka)
21	MF	SWE	Peter Gwargis (on loan from Malmö, previously on loan at J-Södra)
24	MF	SWE	De Pievre Ilunga (promoted from junior squad)
25	GK	SWE	Jonas Olsson (from Brommapojkarna)

Out:

No.	Pos.	Nation	Player
1	GK	ENG	Alfie Whiteman (loan return to (England) Tottenham Hotspur)
3	DF	UGA	Ronald Mukiibi (to Utsikten)
9	FW	SWE	Johan Bertilsson (to Karlstad)
14	FW	MKD	Daniel Krezic (to (Republic of Ireland) Cork City)
15	DF	SWE	Gustaf Lagerbielke (loan return to Elfsborg)
17	DF	SWE	Anton Kralj (to Hammarby)
19	FW	SWE	Omar Faraj (loan return to (Spain) Atlético Levante)
21	DF	SWE	Adam Carlén (to Göteborg)
23	MF	SWE	Adhavan Rajamohan (free agent)
25	GK	USA	Jeffrey Gal (to (United States) Chicago Fire)
—	GK	SWE	Hugo Claesson (to Åtvidaberg, previously on loan)

=== Varberg ===
In:

No.	Pos.	Nation	Player
1	GK	SWE	David Olsson (from Lindome)
12	DF	SWE	Vilmer Rönnberg (from Hammarby TFF)
16	MF	SWE	Adnan Marić (from J-Södra)
17	FW	SWE	Assad Al Hamlawi (from Helsingborg, previously on loan at J-Södra)
19	MF	GNB	Júnior Pussick (from (Spain) Manchego Ciudad Real)
20	DF	SWE	Oliver Silverholt (from Öster)
36	FW	SWE	Ömür Pektas (from Stocksund)
39	MF	FRA	Yassine El Ouatki (from (France) Paris Saint-Germain B)
40	DF	SWE	Niklas Dahlström (from J-Södra)
45	MF	SWE	Maxime Sainte (from Hammarby TFF)

Out:

No.	Pos.	Nation	Player
1	GK	SWE	Philip Mårtensson (free agent)
9	FW	SWE	Robin Simović (to (South Korea) Jeonnam Dragons)
12	FW	SWE	Simon Adjei (to Eskilstuna)
16	FW	SWE	Alexander Johansson (to Mjällby)
19	FW	SWE	Filip Bohman (to Trelleborg)
22	MF	SWE	André Boman (to Elfsborg)
26	DF	SWE	Noah Johansson (to Tvååker)
28	FW	SWE	Flamur Dzelili (to J-Södra)
32	FW	NED	Des Kunst (to Katwijk)
—	MF	SWE	Albin Winbo (to (Republic of Ireland) Cork City, previously on loan at (Norway) Sandefjord)
—	FW	SWE	Jaheem Burke (to Västerås, previously on loan at Norrby)

=== Brommapojkarna ===
In:

No.	Pos.	Nation	Player
1	GK	SWE	Oscar Linnér (from (Denmark) AaB)
2	DF	NOR	Torbjørn Lysaker Heggem (from (Norway) Sandnes Ulf)
5	DF	SWE	Viktor Agardius (from Norrköping)
8	FW	RSA	Liam Jordan (from (Denmark) Helsingør)
13	MF	SWE	Ludvig Fritzson (from Östersund)
17	MF	DEN	Alexander Jensen (from (Denmark) Fredericia)
21	MF	SWE	Samuel Kroon (from Halmstad)
24	MF	SWE	Kevin Ackermann (from Örgryte)
26	DF	ARM	André Calisir (from (Denmark) Silkeborg)

Out:

No.	Pos.	Nation	Player
1	GK	SWE	Jonas Olsson (to Degerfors)
2	DF	SWE	Martin Falkeborn (to (Gibraltar) Europa Point)
5	DF	SWE	Oscar Krusnell (to (Norway) Haugesund)
8	MF	SWE	Nicklas Maripuu (to Vasalund)
12	DF	SWE	Alexander Almqvist (to Oddevold)
18	DF	SWE	Robin Frej (to GAIS)
20	GK	SWE	Alexander Lundin (to Mjällby)
21	FW	SWE	Philip Hellquist (to Täby)
22	MF	SWE	Wilmer Odefalk (to Djurgården)
24	DF	SWE	Theo Bergvall (to Djurgården)
26	MF	SWE	Lucas Bergvall (to Djurgården)
27	FW	SWE	Elias Jemal (to Vasalund)
29	DF	SWE	Axel Wallenborg (loan return to Djurgården)
—	FW	SWE	Felix Strängborn (to Boden)

=== Halmstad ===
In:

No.	Pos.	Nation	Player
9	FW	SWE	Viktor Granath (from Västerås)
11	MF	SWE	Villiam Granath (from Skövde)
15	DF	SWE	Gustav Friberg (from Skövde)
16	DF	SWE	Benjamin Hjertstrand (from Örebro)
18	FW	GHA	Naeem Mohammed (from Sandviken)
24	MF	IRQ	Amir Al-Ammari (on loan from Göteborg, previously on loan at Mjällby)

Out:

No.	Pos.	Nation	Player
3	DF	SWE	Alexander Berntsson (to J-Södra)
10	FW	GHA	Sadat Karim (to (Greece) Apollon Smyrnis)
11	MF	SWE	Samuel Kroon (to Brommapojkarna)
14	FW	SWE	Mikael Boman (free agent)
18	MF	SWE	Emil Tot Wikström (to Brage)
21	DF	SWE	Andreas Bengtsson (to (Denmark) Køge)
—	DF	SWE	Isac Larsson (free agent, previously on loan at Ängelholm)

== See also ==
- 2023 Allsvenskan
