= List of Swedish football transfers summer 2022 =

Swedish football transfers

This is a list of Swedish football transfers for the 2022 summer transfer window. Only transfers featuring Allsvenskan are listed.

== Allsvenskan ==
Note: Flags indicate national team as has been defined under FIFA eligibility rules. Players may hold more than one non-FIFA nationality.

=== AIK ===
In: Note: Flags indicate national team as defined under FIFA eligibility rules; some limited exceptions apply. Players may hold more than one non-FIFA nationality.

No.	Pos.	Nation	Player
11	FW	SWE	John Guidetti (from (Spain) Celta)
17	MF	LUX	Vincent Thill (on loan from (Ukraine) Vorskla Poltava)
38	MF	SWE	Taha Ayari (promoted from junior squad)

Out: Note: Flags indicate national team as defined under FIFA eligibility rules; some limited exceptions apply. Players may hold more than one non-FIFA nationality.

No.	Pos.	Nation	Player
17	MF	GHA	Ebenezer Ofori (to (Denmark) Vejle, previously on loan)
18	MF	SWE	Amar Abdirahman Ahmed (to (France) Troyes)
19	FW	SWE	Jordan Larsson (loan return to (Russia) Spartak Moskva)
32	MF	SWE	Tom Strannegård (on loan to (Norway) Start)
–	DF	LBN	Felix Michel Melki (to Eskilstuna, previously on loan)
–	FW	SRB	Bojan Radulović (to (Finland) HJK Helsinki, previously on loan)
–	DF	SWE	Ahmad Faqa (on loan to Sandviken, previously loan on at Västerås)

=== Degerfors ===
In: Note: Flags indicate national team as defined under FIFA eligibility rules; some limited exceptions apply. Players may hold more than one non-FIFA nationality.

No.	Pos.	Nation	Player
15	DF	SWE	Gustaf Lagerbielke (on loan from Elfsborg)
18	FW	SWE	Albin Mörfelt (from (Norway) Vålerenga)
19	FW	SWE	Omar Faraj (on loan from (Spain) Levante)
20	MF	SWE	Elyas Bouzaiene (from Lund)

Out: Note: Flags indicate national team as defined under FIFA eligibility rules; some limited exceptions apply. Players may hold more than one non-FIFA nationality.

No.	Pos.	Nation	Player
15	MF	SWE	Jakob Andersson (released)
19	MF	SWE	Abdelrahman Saidi (to Hammarby)

=== Djurgården ===
In: Note: Flags indicate national team as defined under FIFA eligibility rules; some limited exceptions apply. Players may hold more than one non-FIFA nationality.

No.	Pos.	Nation	Player
14	MF	SWE	Besard Sabovic (from (Russia) Khimki)
33	DF	SWE	Marcus Danielson (free transfer)

Out: Note: Flags indicate national team as defined under FIFA eligibility rules; some limited exceptions apply. Players may hold more than one non-FIFA nationality.

No.	Pos.	Nation	Player
18	MF	SWE	Isak Hien (to (Italy) Hellas Verona)
22	DF	NOR	Leo Cornic (to (Norway) Rosenborg)
24	DF	KEN	Frank Odhiambo (on loan to Haninge)
27	DF	SWE	Melker Jonsson (on loan to Landskrona, then sold)
–	GK	NOR	Per Kristian Bråtveit (to (Norway) Vålerenga, previously on loan at (France) Nîmes Olympique)
–	FW	SWE	Adam Bergmark Wiberg (to Öster, previously on loan)
–	DF	SWE	Axel Wallenborg (on loan to Brommapojkarna, previously on loan at Haninge)

=== Elfsborg ===
In: Note: Flags indicate national team as defined under FIFA eligibility rules; some limited exceptions apply. Players may hold more than one non-FIFA nationality.

No.	Pos.	Nation	Player
8	DF	SWE	Sebastian Holmén (from (Turkey) Çaykur Rizespor)
16	MF	KEN	Timothy Ouma (from (Kenya) Nairobi City Stars)
23	DF	SWE	Niklas Hult (from (Germany) Hannover 96)

Out: Note: Flags indicate national team as defined under FIFA eligibility rules; some limited exceptions apply. Players may hold more than one non-FIFA nationality.

No.	Pos.	Nation	Player
2	DF	SWE	Gustaf Lagerbielke (on loan to Degerfors)
10	MF	SWE	Simon Olsson (to (Netherlands) Heerenveen)
22	FW	SWE	Kevin Holmén (on loan to Skövde)
23	FW	SWE	Prince Isaac Kouame (on loan to Skövde, previously on loan at Motala)
29	DF	SWE	Oliver Zandén (to (France) Toulouse)

=== GIF Sundsvall ===
In: Note: Flags indicate national team as defined under FIFA eligibility rules; some limited exceptions apply. Players may hold more than one non-FIFA nationality.

No.	Pos.	Nation	Player
6	MF	AUS	Peter Makrillos (from (Denmark) Fredericia)
27	DF	POR	Gabriel Castro (from (Portugal) Sintrense)

Out: Note: Flags indicate national team as defined under FIFA eligibility rules; some limited exceptions apply. Players may hold more than one non-FIFA nationality.

No.	Pos.	Nation	Player
2	DF	SWE	Anton Eriksson (to Norrköping)
6	DF	SWE	Daniel Stensson (to Sirius)
18	MF	SWE	Jesper Carström (on loan to Gefle)
20	DF	SWE	Niklas Dahlström (to Jönköpings Södra)

=== Häcken ===
In: Note: Flags indicate national team as defined under FIFA eligibility rules; some limited exceptions apply. Players may hold more than one non-FIFA nationality.

No.	Pos.	Nation	Player
14	MF	SWE	Simon Gustafson (from (Netherlands) Utrecht)
20	FW	JAM	Blair Turgott (free transfer)
22	MF	SWE	Tobias Sana (from IFK Göteborg)
23	MF	SWE	Momodou Lamin Sonko (promoted from junior squad)
30	GK	SWE	Johan Brattberg (loan return from Utsikten)

Out: Note: Flags indicate national team as defined under FIFA eligibility rules; some limited exceptions apply. Players may hold more than one non-FIFA nationality.

No.	Pos.	Nation	Player
6	MF	SWE	Alexander Faltsetas (on loan to Helsingborg)
7	MF	SWE	Leo Bengtsson (to (Cyprus) Aris Limassol)
17	MF	SWE	Gustav Berggren (to (Poland) Raków Częstochowa)
22	DF	SWE	Tobias Carlsson (on loan to Varberg)
28	MF	SWE	Samir Maarouf (to Eskilstuna)
29	GK	NOR	Jonathan Rasheed (to Värnamo)

=== Hammarby ===
In: Note: Flags indicate national team as defined under FIFA eligibility rules; some limited exceptions apply. Players may hold more than one non-FIFA nationality.

No.	Pos.	Nation	Player
9	FW	NOR	Veton Berisha (from (Norway) Viking)
15	MF	SWE	Pavle Vagić (from (Norway) Rosenborg)
17	FW	ESP	David Concha (from (Spain) Badajoz)
30	DF	SUR	Shaquille Pinas (from (Bulgaria) Ludogorets Razgrad)
32	DF	GHA	Nathaniel Adjei (from Hammarby Talang)
33	MF	SWE	Fredrik Hammar (from Hammarby Talang)
34	MF	SWE	Alper Demirol (promoted from junior squad)
40	MF	SWE	Abdelrahman Saidi (from Degerfors)
–	FW	SWE	Montader Madjed (from Varberg)
–	DF	SWE	Casper Eklund (from Öster)
–	FW	CMR	Saidou Alioum (on loan from (Cameroon) Sahel)

Out: Note: Flags indicate national team as defined under FIFA eligibility rules; some limited exceptions apply. Players may hold more than one non-FIFA nationality.

No.	Pos.	Nation	Player
3	DF	SWE	Dennis Widgren (to Sirius)
7	FW	SLO	Aljoša Matko (to (Slovenia) Celje, previously on loan at (Slovenia) Olimpija Ljubljana)
9	MF	KOS	Astrit Selmani (to (Israel) Hapoel Be'er Sheva)
15	FW	SWE	Mayckel Lahdo (to (Netherlands) AZ)
17	MF	SWE	Abdul Khalili (to Helsingborg)
31	DF	SWE	Ben Engdahl (to (Denmark) Nordsjælland)
42	DF	DEN	Bjørn Paulsen (to (Denmark) OB)
44	MF	SWE	Williot Swedberg (to (Spain) Celta)
–	FW	SWE	Montader Madjed (on loan to Hammarby Talang)
–	DF	SWE	Casper Eklund (on loan to Hammarby Talang)
–	FW	CMR	Saidou Alioum (on loan to Hammarby Talang)

=== Helsingborg ===
In: Note: Flags indicate national team as defined under FIFA eligibility rules; some limited exceptions apply. Players may hold more than one non-FIFA nationality.

No.	Pos.	Nation	Player
2	DF	DEN	Philip Rejnhold (from (Denmark) Helsingør)
7	FW	ALB	Arian Kabashi (from Dalkurd)
15	FW	SWE	Rasmus Wiedesheim-Paul (on loan from (Norway) Rosenborg)
16	MF	SWE	Alexander Faltsetas (on loan from Häcken)
19	MF	SWE	Abdul Khalili (from Hammarby)
33	FW	SWE	Amar Muhsin (from Eskilstuna)
44	DF	NOR	Thomas Rogne (from (Greece) Apollon Smyrnis)

Out: Note: Flags indicate national team as defined under FIFA eligibility rules; some limited exceptions apply. Players may hold more than one non-FIFA nationality.

No.	Pos.	Nation	Player
2	DF	CGO	Ravy Tsouka (to (Belgium) Zulte Waregem)
7	FW	SWE	Viktor Lundberg (on loan to Örgryte)
9	FW	CUW	Anthony van den Hurk (to (Turkey) Çaykur Rizespor)
11	FW	FIN	Rasmus Karjalainen (to (Finland) AC Oulu)
14	FW	SWE	Adam Kaied (on loan to (Norway) Stabæk)
15	FW	SWE	Assad Al Hamlawi (on loan to Jönköpings Södra)
16	DF	SWE	Jakob Voelkerling Persson (on loan to Ängelholm, then sold to Sirius)
18	GK	SWE	Alexander Nilsson (on loan to Jönköpings Södra)
19	MF	SWE	Lucas Lingman (on loan to (Finland) HJK Helsinki)
24	DF	SWE	Emil Hellman (on loan to Ängelholm)
26	MF	SWE	Victor Göransson (on loan to Ängelholm)
30	MF	SWE	Albert Ejupi (to (Austria) Hartberg)
37	MF	SWE	Armin Gigović (loan return to (Russia) Rostov)
40	GK	SWE	Nils Arvidsson (on loan to Ängelholm)

=== IFK Göteborg ===
In: Note: Flags indicate national team as defined under FIFA eligibility rules; some limited exceptions apply. Players may hold more than one non-FIFA nationality.

No.	Pos.	Nation	Player
6	FW	NOR	Eman Markovic (from Norrköping)
10	FW	NGR	Suleiman Abdullahi (from (Germany) Union Berlin)
16	FW	SWE	Linus Carlstrand (promoted from junior squad)
18	DF	SWE	Felix Eriksson (promoted from junior squad)
24	MF	CIV	Abundance Salaou (from (Ivory Coast) ASEC Mimosas)
27	DF	SWE	Alai Hussain Ghasem (promoted from junior squad)
29	FW	NGR	Saidu Salisu (on loan from (Nigeria) Kano Pillars)
99	GK	SWE	Pontus Dahlberg (from (England) Watford)

Out: Note: Flags indicate national team as defined under FIFA eligibility rules; some limited exceptions apply. Players may hold more than one non-FIFA nationality.

No.	Pos.	Nation	Player
3	DF	BRA	Bernardo Vilar (to Värnamo)
5	DF	SWE	Alexander Jallow (to (Italy) Brescia)
6	MF	IRQ	Amir Al-Ammari (on loan to Mjällby)
12	GK	ISL	Adam Ingi Benediktsson (on loan to Trollhättan)
22	MF	SWE	Tobias Sana (to Häcken)
23	MF	IRQ	Kevin Yakob (to (Denmark) AGF)
24	MF	CRO	Filip Ambrož (on loan to (Croatia) Dugopolje)
29	FW	SWE	Oscar Vilhelmsson (to (Germany) SV Darmstadt 98)

=== Kalmar ===
In: Note: Flags indicate national team as defined under FIFA eligibility rules; some limited exceptions apply. Players may hold more than one non-FIFA nationality.

No.	Pos.	Nation	Player
12	FW	SWE	Sebastian Nanasi (on loan from Malmö)
16	DF	SWE	Adnan Kojic (from Sylvia)
18	FW	SWE	Isak Bjerkebo (from Malmö U20)
27	FW	SEN	Papa Alioune Diouf (from (Cyprus) Ermis Aradippou)
—	DF	FIN	Rony Jansson (from (Finland) HJK Helsinki)

Out: Note: Flags indicate national team as defined under FIFA eligibility rules; some limited exceptions apply. Players may hold more than one non-FIFA nationality.

No.	Pos.	Nation	Player
5	DF	SWE	Doug Bergqvist (loan return to (Ukraine) Chornomorets Odesa)
9	MF	SWE	Isak Jansson (to (Spain) Cartagena)
28	DF	SWE	Elias Olsson (on loan to (Denmark) Næstved)
–	FW	SWE	Alex Mortensen (to (Netherlands) Groningen, previously on loan)

=== Malmö ===
In: Note: Flags indicate national team as defined under FIFA eligibility rules; some limited exceptions apply. Players may hold more than one non-FIFA nationality.

No.	Pos.	Nation	Player
15	MF	SWE	Joseph Ceesay (from (Poland) Lechia Gdańsk)
20	MF	SWE	Moustafa Zeidan (from Sirius)
25	MF	FRA	Mahamé Siby (from (France) Strasbourg)
26	MF	SWE	Mubaarak Nuh (loan return from (Denmark) Jammerbugt)
33	FW	SLE	Mohamed Buya Turay (from (China) Henan Jianye)
39	GK	SWE	Viktor Andersson (promoted from junior squad)
40	MF	GHA	Emmanuel Lomotey (from (France) Amiens)

Out: Note: Flags indicate national team as defined under FIFA eligibility rules; some limited exceptions apply. Players may hold more than one non-FIFA nationality.

No.	Pos.	Nation	Player
2	DF	SWE	Eric Larsson (to (Greece) OFI)
15	DF	BIH	Anel Ahmedhodžić (to (England) Sheffield United, previously on loan at (France) Bordeaux)
17	FW	GHA	Malik Abubakari (on loan to (Finland) HJK Helsinki)
19	MF	SRB	Veljko Birmančević (to (France) Toulouse)
33	MF	SWE	Amel Mujanić (on loan to (Cyprus) APOEL)
35	MF	SWE	Samuel Adrian (on loan to Jönköpings Södra)
37	FW	SWE	Sebastian Nanasi (on loan to Kalmar)
–	FW	MLI	Abdramane Djittèye (on loan to Lund, previously on loan at (Denmark) Jammerbugt)
—	DF	MLI	Ismaël Sidibé (on loan to Olympic, previously on loan at (Denmark) Jammerbugt)
–	DF	NGR	Kelvin Emmanuel Igbonekwu (on loan to Olympic, previously on loan at (Denmark) Jammerbugt)
–	MF	SWE	David Edvardsson (on loan to Värnamo, previously on loan at (Denmark) Jammerbugt)
–	MF	SWE	Aleksander Damnjanovic Nilsson (to (Sweden) Sandefjord, previously on loan)

=== Mjällby ===
In: Note: Flags indicate national team as defined under FIFA eligibility rules; some limited exceptions apply. Players may hold more than one non-FIFA nationality.

No.	Pos.	Nation	Player
2	DF	SWE	Jesper Merbom Adolfsson (from Västerås)
18	FW	SWE	Yusuf Abdulazeez (from (Nigeria) Gombe United)
24	DF	SWE	Heradi Rashidi (from Brommapojkarna)
20	MF	IRQ	Amir Al-Ammari (on loan from IFK Göteborg)
–	GK	SWE	Elia Berg (promoted from junior squad)

Out: Note: Flags indicate national team as defined under FIFA eligibility rules; some limited exceptions apply. Players may hold more than one non-FIFA nationality.

No.	Pos.	Nation	Player
2	DF	CRO	Josip Filipović (released)
6	MF	DEN	Magnus Wørts (retired)
9	FW	SWE	Albin Mörfelt (loan return to (Norway) Vålerenga)
18	FW	SWE	Rasmus Wiedesheim-Paul (loan return to (Norway) Rosenborg)
24	FW	SWE	Taylor Silverholt (on loan to Falkenberg)
–	GK	SWE	Elia Berg (on loan to Sölvesborg)

=== Norrköping ===
In: Note: Flags indicate national team as defined under FIFA eligibility rules; some limited exceptions apply. Players may hold more than one non-FIFA nationality.

No.	Pos.	Nation	Player
8	MF	ISL	Arnór Sigurðsson (on loan from (Russia) CSKA Moscow)
9	MF	ISL	Arnór Traustason (from (United States) New England Revolution)
17	MF	SWE	Laorent Shabani (from Sirius)
22	FW	ISL	Andri Lucas Guðjohnsen (from (Spain) Real Madrid Castilla)
24	DF	SWE	Anton Eriksson (from GIF Sundsvall)
25	DF	SWE	Moutaz Neffati (promoted from junior squad)
28	FW	SWE	Fritiof Hellichius (loan return from Sylvia)
34	MF	SWE	Noel Sernelius (promoted from junior squad)

Out: Note: Flags indicate national team as defined under FIFA eligibility rules; some limited exceptions apply. Players may hold more than one non-FIFA nationality.

No.	Pos.	Nation	Player
3	DF	ISR	Yahav Gurfinkel (released)
8	MF	GHA	Ishaq Abdulrazak (to (Belgium) Anderlecht)
9	FW	NOR	Eman Markovic (to IFK Göteborg)
19	FW	SWE	Lucas Lima (to (Norway) Fredrikstad)
25	MF	SWE	Filip Dagerstål (loan return to (Russia) Khimki)

=== Sirius ===
In: Note: Flags indicate national team as defined under FIFA eligibility rules; some limited exceptions apply. Players may hold more than one non-FIFA nationality.

No.	Pos.	Nation	Player
12	DF	ISL	Óli Valur Ómarsson (from (Iceland) Stjarnan)
18	DF	SWE	Daniel Stensson (from GIF Sundsvall)
21	DF	SWE	Dennis Widgren (from Hammarby)
23	MF	RSA	Tashreeq Matthews (from Varberg)
26	DF	SWE	Jakob Voelkerling Persson (from Helsingborg)
32	MF	SWE	Samuel Wikman (loan return from Umeå)

Out: Note: Flags indicate national team as defined under FIFA eligibility rules; some limited exceptions apply. Players may hold more than one non-FIFA nationality.

No.	Pos.	Nation	Player
16	MF	SWE	Herman Sjögrell (on loan to Örgryte)
18	MF	SWE	Laorent Shabani (to Norrköping)
19	FW	SWE	Antonio Yakoub (on loan to Gefle)
21	DF	SLE	Kevin Wright (released)
23	MF	SWE	Moustafa Zeidan (to Malmö)
26	DF	SWE	Isak Ssewankambo (released)
27	DF	SWE	Johan Karlsson (to Kalmar)
30	GK	SWE	August Ahlin (retired)

=== Varberg ===
In: Note: Flags indicate national team as defined under FIFA eligibility rules; some limited exceptions apply. Players may hold more than one non-FIFA nationality.

No.	Pos.	Nation	Player
19	FW	SWE	Filip Bohman (from Olympic)
20	DF	SWE	Tobias Carlsson (on loan from Häcken)
21	MF	POR	Filipe Sissé (from (Portugal) Manchego Ciudad Real)
33	MF	SWE	Jacob Redenfors (promoted from junior squad)
35	FW	SWE	Dion Krasniqi (from Lund)
42	GK	SWE	Stojan Lukić (free transfer)

Out: Note: Flags indicate national team as defined under FIFA eligibility rules; some limited exceptions apply. Players may hold more than one non-FIFA nationality.

No.	Pos.	Nation	Player
6	MF	SWE	Albin Winbo (on loan to (Norway) Sandefjord)
10	MF	RSA	Tashreeq Matthews (to Sirius)
19	FW	SWE	Montader Madjed (to Hammarby)
21	MF	SWE	Victor Karlsson (on loan to Norrby)
33	FW	SWE	Jaheem Burke (on loan to Norrby)

=== Värnamo ===
In: Note: Flags indicate national team as defined under FIFA eligibility rules; some limited exceptions apply. Players may hold more than one non-FIFA nationality.

No.	Pos.	Nation	Player
1	GK	NOR	Jonathan Rasheed (from Häcken)
16	FW	SWE	Ajdin Zeljkovic (from Örgryte)
26	DF	SWE	Albin Lohikangas (from Gefle)
27	DF	SWE	Johan Kenneryd (promoted from junior squad)
28	FW	GHA	Frank Junior Adjei (from (Ghana) Bibiani Gold Stars)
31	GK	SWE	Hampus Gustafsson (loan return from Åtvidaberg)
32	MF	SWE	David Edvardsson (on loan from Malmö)
33	DF	BRA	Bernardo Vilar (from IFK Göteborg)
—	MF	SWE	Kenan Bilalovic (promoted from junior squad)

Out: Note: Flags indicate national team as defined under FIFA eligibility rules; some limited exceptions apply. Players may hold more than one non-FIFA nationality.

No.	Pos.	Nation	Player
1	GK	SWE	Filip Eriksson (released)
10	DF	BRA	Erick Brendon (to Östersund)
19	FW	SWE	Haris Avdiu (on loan to Östersund)
22	FW	SWE	Victor Andersson (on loan to Ljungskile)
29	FW	SLE	Christian Moses (to Örebro)
31	GK	SWE	Hampus Gustafsson (on loan to Åtvidaberg)

== See also ==
- 2022 Allsvenskan
