= 2020 AIK Fotboll season =

AIK
2020 season
- Chairman: Robert Falck
- Manager: Rikard Norling (until 27 July); Bartosz Grzelak (from 31 July)
- Stadium: Friends Arena
- Allsvenskan: 9th
- 2019–20 Svenska Cupen: Quarterfinal vs Malmö
- 2020–21 Svenska Cupen: Progress to 2018 season
- Top goalscorer: League: Henok Goitom (8); All: Henok Goitom (9)
Home colours	Away colours

The 2020 season was AIK's 129th in existence, their 92nd season in Allsvenskan and their 15th consecutive season in the league. The team was competing in Allsvenskan and Svenska Cupen.

== Squad ==
As of match played 6 December 2020

No.	Name	Nationality	Position	Date of birth (age)	Signed from	Signed in	Contract ends	Apps.	Goals
Goalkeepers
13	Kyriakos Stamatopoulos	(Canada)	GK	28 August 1979 (aged 41)	Tromsø	2011		63	0
23	Budimir Janošević	(Serbia)	GK	21 October 1989 (aged 31)	IF Brommapojkarna	2018	2020	34	0
31	Jakob Haugaard	(Denmark)	GK	1 May 1992 (aged 28)	Unattached	2020		16	0
Defenders
3	Per Karlsson	(Sweden)	DF	2 January 1986 (aged 34)	Academy	2003			
4	Sotirios Papagiannopoulos	(Sweden)	DF	5 September 1990 (aged 30)	Copenhagen	2020		13	0
12	Felix Michel	(Lebanon)	DF	23 July 1994 (aged 26)	AFC Eskilstuna	2019	2022	20	0
15	Robert Lundström	(Sweden)	DF	1 November 1989 (aged 31)	Vålerenga	2018	2020	46	3
16	Robin Tihi	(Finland)	DF	16 March 2002 (aged 18)	Academy	2020		16	1
20	Rasmus Lindkvist	(Sweden)	DF	16 May 1990 (aged 30)	Vålerenga	2017	2020	94	8
25	Erick Otieno	(Kenya)	DF	27 September 1996 (aged 24)	Vasalund	2020		6	0
28	Adam Ben Lamin	(Tunisia)	DF	2 June 2001 (aged 19)	Academy	2019		0	0
29	Eric Kahl	(Sweden)	DF	27 September 2001 (aged 19)	Academy	2020		27	0
33	Mikael Lustig	(Sweden)	DF	13 December 1986 (aged 33)	KAA Gent	2020		13	2
Midfielders
6	Panajotis Dimitriadis	(Sweden)	MF	12 August 1986 (aged 34)	Giresunspor	2018	2020	75	2
7	Sebastian Larsson	(Sweden)	MF	6 June 1985 (aged 35)	Hull City	2018	2020	93	18
8	Enoch Adu	(Ghana)	MF	14 September 1990 (aged 30)	Akhisarspor	2018	2020	104	1
10	Nabil Bahoui	(Sweden)	MF	5 February 1991 (aged 29)	De Graafschap	2019	2022	120	43
17	Ebenezer Ofori	(Ghana)	MF	1 July 1995 (aged 25)	VfB Stuttgart	2020		122	6
18	Bilal Hussein	(Sweden)	MF	22 April 2000 (aged 20)	Academy	2017		49	5
22	Filip Rogić	(Sweden)	MF	14 June 1993 (aged 27)	Orenburg	2020		11	1
24	Heradi Rashidi	(Sweden)	MF	24 July 1994 (aged 26)	Dalkurd	2018	2020	62	2
26	Yasin Ayari	(Sweden)	MF	6 October 2003 (aged 17)	Academy	2020		1	0
32	Tom Strannegård	(Sweden)	MF	29 April 2002 (aged 18)	Academy	2019		14	1
34	Erik Ring	(Sweden)	MF	24 April 2002 (aged 18)	Academy	2020		11	1
Forwards
9	Kolbeinn Sigþórsson	(Iceland)	FW	14 March 1990 (aged 30)	Nantes	2019	2021	45	4
11	Stefan Silva	(Sweden)	FW	11 March 1990 (aged 30)	Palermo	2018	2021	35	2
14	Paulos Abraham	(Sweden)	FW	16 July 2002 (aged 18)	Brommapojkarna	2020		28	5
21	Bojan Radulović	(Serbia)	FW	29 December 1999 (aged 20)	Brighton & Hove Albion	2020		3	0
36	Henok Goitom	(Eritrea)	FW	22 September 1984 (aged 36)	San Jose Earthquakes	2017	2018	262	95
Out on loan
2	Daniel Granli	(Norway)	DF	1 May 1994 (aged 26)	Stabæk	2019	2022	38	0
17	Daniel Mushitu	(Sweden)	FW	22 February 2000 (aged 20)	Västerås	2017		5	0
19	Saku Ylätupa	(Finland)	MF	4 August 1999 (aged 21)	AFC Ajax	2019	2022	22	2
35	Samuel Brolin	(Sweden)	GK	1 May 1998 (aged 22)	Academy	2018		0	0
Left during the season
5	Karol Mets	(Estonia)	DF	16 May 1993 (aged 27)	NAC Breda	2019	2021	49	3
21	Jasir Asani	(Albania)	FW	19 May 1995 (aged 25)	on loan from Partizani Tirana	2020	2020	7	2

=== Players out on loan ===
Note: Flags indicate national team as defined under FIFA eligibility rules; some limited exceptions apply. Players may hold more than one non-FIFA nationality.

No.	Pos.	Nation	Player
2	DF	NOR	Daniel Granli (at AaB until 31 December 2020)
17	FW	SWE	Daniel Mushitu (at IF Karlstad until 31 December 2020)

No.	Pos.	Nation	Player
19	MF	FIN	Saku Ylätupa (at IFK Mariehamn until 31 December 2020)
35	GK	SWE	Samuel Brolin (at Akropolis IF until 31 December 2020)

== Transfers ==
=== In ===
Date	Position	Nationality	Name	From	Fee	Ref.
1 January 2020	DF	(Kenya)	Erick Otieno	Vasalund	Free	
7 January 2020	GK	(Denmark)	Jakob Haugaard	Unattached	Free	
9 January 2020	MF	(Ghana)	Ebenezer Ofori	VfB Stuttgart	Undisclosed	
17 March 2020	FW	(Sweden)	Paulos Abraham	IF Brommapojkarna	Undisclosed	
17 August 2020	DF	(Sweden)	Sotirios Papagiannopoulos	FC Copenhagen	Undisclosed	
17 August 2020	FW	(Serbia)	Bojan Radulović	Unattached	Free	
19 August 2020	MF	(Sweden)	Filip Rogić	Unattached	Free	
25 August 2020	DF	(Sweden)	Mikael Lustig	Unattached	Free	

=== Loans in ===
Start date	Position	Nationality	Name	From	End date	Ref.
1 January 2020	FW	(Albania)	Jasir Asani	Partizani Tirana	30 August 2020	

=== Out ===
Date	Position	Nationality	Name	To	Fee	Ref.
1 January 2020	MF	(Sweden)	Christos Gravius	Degerfors	Undisclosed	
1 January 2020	FW	(Argentina)	Nicolás Stefanelli	Unión La Calera	Undisclosed	
7 January 2020	GK	(Sweden)	Oscar Linnér	Arminia Bielefeld	Undisclosed	
2 October 2020	DF	(Estonia)	Karol Mets	Ettifaq	Undisclosed	

=== Loans out ===
Start date	Position	Nationality	Name	To	End date	Ref.
1 January 2020	GK	(Sweden)	Samuel Brolin	Akropolis	31 December 2020	
1 January 2020	FW	(Sweden)	Daniel Mushitu	IF Karlstad	31 December 2020	
1 July 2020	DF	(Norway)	Daniel Granli	AaB	31 December 2020	
1 July 2020	MF	(Finland)	Saku Ylätupa	IFK Mariehamn	31 December 2020	

== Friendlies ==
18 January 2020	AIK (Sweden)	2–1	(Sweden) IF Karlstad	Solna
14:00	Michel 63'; Asani 72'	Report	Gerhardsson Arvidsson 39'	Stadium: Skytteholms IP; Attendance: 3,292; Referee: Fredrik Hansson

25 January 2020	AIK (Sweden)	1–1	(Sweden) Västerås SK	Solna
14:00	Larsson 4'	Report	Videhult 84'	Stadium: Skytteholms IP; Attendance: 3,803; Referee: Adam Ladebäck

31 January 2020	GIF Sundsvall (Sweden)	1–0	(Sweden) AIK	Sundsvall
13:00	Pichkah 43'	Report	Adu (yellow card) 42'	Stadium: Nordichallen; Attendance: 325; Referee: Arian Chalak

15 February 2020	AIK (Sweden)	1–1	(Russia) FK Rostov	Marbella, Spain
16:00	Mets (yellow card) 65'; Asani 74' (pen.)	Report	Shomurodov 57' (pen.); Pesyakov (yellow card) 73'	Stadium: La Quinta Football Fields

19 February 2020	Akropolis IF (Sweden)	3–0	(Sweden) AIK	Stockholm
17:00	Jakobsson 33'; Weilid 62'; Vasić 90'	Report		Stadium: Grimsta IP; Attendance: 400; Referee: Victor Wolf

== Competitions ==
=== Allsvenskan ===
==== League table ====
Pos	Team	Pld	W	D	L	GF	GA	GD	Pts	Qualification or relegation
7	Örebro SK	30	12	6	12	37	41	−4	42	
8	Hammarby IF	30	10	11	9	47	47	0	41	Qualification for the Europa Conference League second qualifying round (Note: Hammarby IF qualified for the Europa Conference League second qualifying round by winning the 2020–21 Svenska Cupen.)
9	AIK	30	10	9	11	30	33	−3	39	
10	IK Sirius	30	9	11	10	43	51	−8	38	
11	Varbergs BoIS	30	10	7	13	45	44	+1	37	

Source: svenskfotboll.se (in Swedish)
Rules for classification: 1) Points; 2) Goal difference; 3) Goals scored; 4) Head-to-head points; 5) Head-to-head goal difference; 6) Head-to-head away goals scored; 7) Play-off
(Note: Play-off is only played if need to decide champion, teams for relegation or UEFA competition and will be played on a neutral ground).

==== Results summary ====
Overall								Home						Away					
Pld	W	D	L	GF	GA	GD	Pts	W	D	L	GF	GA	GD	W	D	L	GF	GA	GD
5	1	2	2	4	7	−3	5	1	2	0	4	3	+1	0	0	2	0	4	−4

Last updated: 5 March 2020.
Source: AIK Fotboll (in Swedish)

==== Results ====
14 June 2020 Match 1	Örebro	0–2	AIK	Örebro
17:30	Skovgaard (yellow card) 76'	Summary	Ofori (yellow card) 20'; Tihi 59'; Asani 90+2'	Stadium: Behrn Arena; Attendance: 0 Referee: (Sweden) Martin Strömbergsson

17 June 2020 Match 2	AIK	1–4	Norrköping	Solna, Stockholm
19:00	Granli (yellow card) 14'; Goitom 88'	Summary	Thern 5'; Gastegren 9'; Lauritsen 29'; Gerson 32' (pen.) (yellow card) 61'; Hakšabanović (yellow card) 84'	Stadium: Friends Arena; Attendance: 0 Referee: (Sweden) Glenn Nyberg

21 June 2020 Match 3	Hammarby	0–2	AIK	Stockholm
17:30	Andersen (yellow card) 38'; Paulinho (yellow card) 63'	Summary	Tihi (yellow card) 16'; Mets (yellow card) 47'; Tom Strannegård (yellow card) 54'; Hussein 55'; Larsson 58' (pen.)	Stadium: Tele2 Arena; Attendance: 0 Referee: (Sweden) Andreas Ekberg

28 June 2020 Match 4	AIK	2–2	Malmö FF	Solna, Stockholm
17:30	Ofori (yellow card) 24'; Larsson 45+1'; Hussein 58'; Lindkvist (yellow card) 69'; Mets (yellow card) 89'	Summary	Thelin 70' 90' (pen.); Nielsen (yellow card) 88'	Stadium: Friends Arena; Attendance: 0 Referee: (Sweden) Mohammed Al-Hakim

2 July 2020 Match 5	IFK Göteborg	1–0	AIK	Gothenburg
19:00	Farnerud (yellow card) 90'; Mets 90+2' (o.g.)	Summary	Granli (yellow card) 49'; Eric Kahl (yellow card) 63'; Mets (yellow card) 85'	Stadium: Gamla Ullevi; Attendance: 0 Referee: (Sweden) Kristoffer Karlsson

5 July 2020 Match 6	AIK	1–1	Falkenberg	Solna, Stockholm
14:30	Paulos Abraham (yellow card) 37' (goal) 90+1'	Summary	Peter 62'	Stadium: Friends Arena; Attendance: 0 Referee: (Sweden) Kaspar Sjöberg

12 July 2020 Match 7	Helsingborg	2–0	AIK	Helsingborg
14:30	Svensson (yellow card) 45+1'; Alex Timossi Andersson 68'; van den Hurk 83'	Summary	Larsson (yellow card) 73'	Stadium: Olympia; Attendance: 0 Referee: (Sweden) Glenn Nyberg

15 July 2020 Match 8	AIK	1–0	Sirius	Solna, Stockholm
19:00	Hussein (yellow card) 46'; Goitom 74'; Michel (yellow card) 85'; Stamatopoulos (yellow card) 90+2'	Summary	Andersson (yellow card) 28'; Björkström (yellow card) 57'; Hellborg (yellow card) 73'	Stadium: Friends Arena; Attendance: 0 Referee: (Sweden) Bojan Pandžić

19 July 2020 Match 9	Varberg	2–2	AIK	Varberg
14:30	Zackrisson 23'; Selmani 89' (pen.)	Summary	Goitom 12'; Paulos Abraham 75'; Mets (yellow card) 90+1'	Stadium: Varberg Energi Arena; Attendance: 0 Referee: (Sweden) Fredrik Klitte

22 July 2020 Match 10	Häcken	4–0	AIK	Gothenburg
19:00	Bengtsson 6'; Youssef 36'; Zuta 74'; Nilsson 88'	Summary	Eric Kahl (yellow card) 32'; Larsson (yellow card) 42'; Hussein (yellow card) 45+1'; Bahoui (yellow card) 90'	Stadium: Bravida Arena; Attendance: 0 Referee: (Sweden) Mohammed Al-Hakim

26 July 2020 Match 11	AIK	0–1	Djurgården	Solna, Stockholm
17:30	Hussein (yellow card) 45+3'; Goitom (yellow card) 76'	Summary	Witry 77'; Berg (yellow card) 83'; Ulvestad (yellow card) 90+5'	Stadium: Friends Arena; Attendance: 0 Referee: (Sweden) Glenn Nyberg

2 August 2020 Match 12	Kalmar	0–0	AIK	Kalmar
18:00			Adu (yellow card) 21'; Mets (yellow card) 33'	Stadium: Guldfågeln Arena; Attendance: 0 Referee: (Sweden) Kaspar Sjöberg

6 August 2020 Match 13	AIK	1–2	Elfsborg	Solna, Stockholm
19:00	Bahoui (yellow card) 32'; Goitom 89'; Eric Kahl (yellow card) 90+1'	Summary	Okumu (yellow card) 6'; Frick 18' (yellow card) 33'; Karlsson 39'	Stadium: Friends Arena; Attendance: 0 Referee: (Sweden) Bojan Pandžić

9 August 2020 Match 14	Mjällby	3–1	AIK	Hällevik
17:30	Ogbu 10' 43' (pen.); Jeahze (yellow card) 58'; Silverholt 76'	Summary	Tihi (yellow card) 35'; Adu 40' (pen.); Karlsson (yellow card) 42'	Stadium: Strandvallen; Attendance: 0 Referee: (Sweden) Mohammed Al-Hakim

13 August 2020 Match 15	AIK	0–1	Östersunds FK	Solna, Stockholm
19:00	Michel (yellow card) 23'; Karlsson (red card) 85'; Adu (yellow card) 90+7'	Summary	Fritzson 27'; Amin (yellow card) 78'; Haugan (yellow card) 87'; Sonko Sundberg (red card) 90+7'	Stadium: Friends Arena; Attendance: 0 Referee: (Sweden) Kristoffer Karlsson

16 August 2020 Match 16	Falkenberg	1–1	AIK	Falkenberg
14:30	Söderström 45+5'; Gustaf Nilsson (yellow card) 77'	Summary	Larsson 23' (yellow card) 54'; Bahoui (yellow card) 39'; Eric Kahl (yellow card) 61'; Ofori (yellow card) 63'; Dimitriadis (yellow card) 90+1'	Stadium: Falcon Alkoholfri Arena; Attendance: 0 Referee: (Sweden) Kristoffer Karlsson

23 August 2020 Match 17	AIK	2–0	Helsingborg	Solna, Stockholm
17:30	Larsson 19'; Mets 52'; Bahoui (yellow card) 79'	Summary		Stadium: Friends Arena; Attendance: 0 Referee: (Sweden) Victor Wolf

30 August 2020 Match 18	AIK	0–1	Häcken	Solna, Stockholm
14:30			Irandust 57'	Stadium: Friends Arena; Attendance: 0

13 September 2020 Match 19	Malmö FF	0–0	AIK	Malmö
17:30				Stadium: Eleda Stadion; Attendance: 0

20 September 2020 Match 20	AIK	3–0	Hammarby	Solna, Stockholm
14:30	Bahoui 27'; Abraham 37'; Lustig 77'			Stadium: Friends Arena; Attendance: 0

28 September 2020 Match 21	AIK	1–0	Mjällby	Solna, Stockholm
19:00	Bahoui 90+3'			Stadium: Friends Arena; Attendance: 0

4 October 2020 Match 22	Östersunds FK	1–2	AIK	Östersund
14:30	Ishwerwood 87'		Karlsson 7'; Goitom 64'	Stadium: Jämtkraft Arena; Attendance: 0

18 October 2020 Match 23	AIK	2–0	IFK Göteborg	Solna, Stockholm
17:30	Rogić 4'; Goitom 61'			Stadium: Friends Arena; Attendance: 0

26 October 2020 Match 24	Norrköping	2–2	AIK	Norrköping
19:00	Levi 46'; Castegren 50'		Goitom 26'; Larsson 87' (pen.)	Stadium: Östgötaporten; Attendance: 0

29 October 2020 Match 25	IK Sirius	0–0	AIK	Uppsala
19:00				Stadium: Studenternas IP; Attendance: 0

2 November 2020 Match 26	AIK	1–0	Varberg	Solna, Stockholm
19:00	Goitom 58'			Stadium: Friends Arena; Attendance: 0

8 November 2020 Match 27	Djurgården	0–1	AIK	Stockholm
14:30			Nabil Bahoui 74'	Stadium: Tele2 Arena; Attendance: 0

22 November 2020 Match 28	AIK	0–2	Örebro	Solna, Stockholm
14:30	Hussein (yellow card) 64'; Papagiannopoulos (yellow card) 80'; Bahoui (yellow card) 88'; Sigþórsson (yellow card) 90+4'	Report	Almebäck (yellow card) 29'; Kahl 39' (o.g.); Hümmet 60' (yellow card) 61'; Mårtensson (yellow card) 68'; Gall (yellow card) 88'	Stadium: Friends Arena; Attendance: 0 Referee: (Sweden) Glenn Nyberg

30 November 2020 Match 29	AIK	0–1	Kalmar	Solna, Stockholm
19:00	Papagiannopoulos (yellow card) 29'; Adu (yellow card) 72'	Report	Elm (yellow card) 31'; Isak Jansson (yellow card) 70'; Israelsson 84'; Söderberg (yellow card) 90+2'	Stadium: Friends Arena; Attendance: 0 Referee: (Sweden) Bojan Pandžić

6 December 2020 Match 30	IF Elfsborg	2–2	AIK	Borås
14:30	Olsson 16'; Alm 22'; Frick (yellow card) 66'	Report	Papagiannopoulos (yellow card) 50'; Bahoui 59'; Lustig 70' (yellow card) 74'; Goitom (yellow card) 86'; Larsson (yellow card) 90+3'	Stadium: Borås Arena; Attendance: 0 Referee: (Sweden) Fredrik Klitte

=== Svenska Cupen ===
==== 2019–20 ====
===== Group stage =====
Pos	Team	Pld	W	D	L	GF	GA	GD	Pts	Qualification
1	AIK	3	2	1	0	6	3	+3	7	Advance to Knockout stage
2	Kalmar FF	3	2	0	1	9	3	+6	6	
3	Jönköpings Södra IF	3	1	1	1	4	7	−3	4	
4	Örgryte IS	3	0	0	3	0	6	−6	0	

Source: Swedish Football Association
Rules for classification: 1) Points; 2) Goal difference; 3) Goals scored; 4) Head-to-head record; 5) Highest ranked team

23 February 2020 Group stage	AIK	2–2	Jönköpings Södra IF	Solna
12:30	Haugaard (yellow card) 21'; Otieno (yellow card) 68'; Ofori 79'; Goitom 81'	Report	Crona (yellow card) 55'; Kozica 69' (pen.); Hamidovic 74'; Kwakwa (yellow card) 90+1'	Stadium: Skytteholms IP; Attendance: 4,923; Referee: Bojan Pandzic

1 March 2020 Group stage	Örgryte IS	0–1	AIK	Gothenburg
14:30	Paulson (yellow card) 18' (yellow-red card) 89'; Stanisic (yellow card) 54'; Sahlin (yellow card) 66'	Report	Razak 32' (o.g.)	Stadium: Bravida Arena; Attendance: 2,111; Referee: Kaspar Sjöberg

9 March 2020 Group stage	AIK	3–1	Kalmar FF	Solna
19:00	Ylätupa 45+3', 71'; Mets (yellow card) 74'; Asani 79' (yellow card) 42'	Report	Löfkvist (yellow card) 10'; Elm (yellow card) 32'; Fröling (yellow card) 74'; Aliti 76'; Johansson (yellow card) 86'	Stadium: Skytteholms IP; Attendance: 5,026; Referee: Mohammed Al-Hakim

===== Knock-out stage =====
25 June 2020 Quarter-final	Malmö FF	4–1	AIK	Malmö
16:00	Christiansen 39' 66' 88'; Rieks 74'	Summary	Paulos Abraham 7' (yellow card) 9' (yellow-red card) 71'; Tihi (yellow card) 58'; Karlsson (red card) 78'	Stadium: Eleda Stadion; Attendance: 0 Referee: (Sweden) Kristoffer Karlsson

==== 2020–21 ====
1 October 2020 Second round	Karlslund	1–2	AIK	Örebro
14:00	Diawara 60'	Report	Abraham 15'; Ring 17'	Stadium: Karlslund Arena; Attendance: 0

== Squad statistics ==
As of match played 6 December 2020

=== Appearances and goals ===
No.	Pos	Nat	Player	Total		Allsvenskan		2019–20 Svenska Cupen		2020–21 Svenska Cupen	
No.	Pos	Nat	Player	Apps	Goals	Apps	Goals	Apps	Goals	Apps	Goals
3	DF	(Sweden) SWE	Per Karlsson	31	1	23+3	1	3+1	0	1	0
4	DF	(Sweden) SWE	Sotirios Papagiannopoulos	13	0	12	0	0	0	1	0
6	MF	(Sweden) SWE	Panajotis Dimitriadis	10	0	0+9	0	0	0	1	0
7	MF	(Sweden) SWE	Sebastian Larsson	33	5	27+1	5	4	0	0+1	0
8	MF	(Ghana) GHA	Enoch Kofi Adu	27	1	16+7	1	1+3	0	0	0
9	FW	(Iceland) ISL	Kolbeinn Sigþórsson	20	0	5+13	0	0+1	0	0+1	0
10	MF	(Sweden) SWE	Nabil Bahoui	17	4	10+7	4	0	0	0	0
11	FW	(Sweden) SWE	Stefan Silva	18	0	2+11	0	2+2	0	1	0
12	DF	(Lebanon) LBN	Felix Michel	11	0	5+3	0	1+2	0	0	0
14	FW	(Sweden) SWE	Paulos Abraham	28	5	22+4	3	1	1	1	1
15	DF	(Sweden) SWE	Robert Lundström	17	0	5+10	0	1	0	1	0
16	DF	(Finland) FIN	Robin Tihi	16	1	10+3	1	3	0	0	0
17	MF	(Ghana) GHA	Ebenezer Ofori	21	1	10+6	0	3+1	1	1	0
18	MF	(Sweden) SWE	Bilal Hussein	27	2	16+9	2	1	0	0+1	0
20	DF	(Sweden) SWE	Rasmus Lindkvist	14	0	5+5	0	2+2	0	0	0
21	FW	(Serbia) SRB	Bojan Radulović	3	0	1+2	0	0	0	0	0
22	MF	(Sweden) SWE	Filip Rogić	11	1	10+1	1	0	0	0	0
23	GK	(Serbia) SRB	Budimir Janošević	19	0	16	0	2	0	1	0
24	MF	(Sweden) SWE	Heradi Rashidi	12	0	8+3	0	0+1	0	0	0
25	DF	(Kenya) KEN	Erick Otieno	6	0	1+3	0	2	0	0	0
26	MF	(Sweden) SWE	Yasin Ayari	1	0	1	0	0	0	0	0
29	DF	(Sweden) SWE	Eric Kahl	27	0	23+3	0	0	0	1	0
31	GK	(Denmark) DEN	Jakob Haugaard	16	0	14	0	2	0	0	0
32	MF	(Sweden) SWE	Tom Strannegård	13	0	8+4	0	1	0	0	0
33	DF	(Sweden) SWE	Mikael Lustig	13	2	11+2	2	0	0	0	0
34	MF	(Sweden) SWE	Erik Ring	11	1	7+3	0	0	0	1	1
36	FW	(Eritrea) ERI	Henok Goitom	34	9	26+3	8	4	1	1	0
Players away on loan:
2	DF	(Norway) NOR	Daniel Granli	14	0	11+2	0	0+1	0	0	0
19	MF	(Finland) FIN	Saku Ylätupa	11	2	4+3	0	4	2	0	0
Players who appeared for AIK but left during the season:
5	DF	(Estonia) EST	Karol Mets	24	1	19+1	1	4	0	0	0
21	FW	(Albania) ALB	Jasir Asani	7	2	2+2	1	3	1	0	0

=== Goal scorers ===
Place	Position	Nation	Number	Name	Allsvenskan	2019–20 Svenska Cupen	2020–21 Svenska Cupen	Total
1	FW	(Eritrea)	36	Henok Goitom	8	1	0	9
2	MF	(Sweden)	7	Sebastian Larsson	5	0	0	5
2	FW	(Sweden)	14	Paulos Abraham	3	1	1	5
4	MF	(Sweden)	10	Nabil Bahoui	4	0	0	4
5	DF	(Sweden)	33	Mikael Lustig	2	0	0	2
5	MF	(Sweden)	18	Bilal Hussein	2	0	0	2
5	MF	(Albania)	21	Jasir Asani	1	1	0	2
5	MF	(Finland)	19	Saku Ylätupa	0	2	0	2
9	DF	(Sweden)	3	Per Karlsson	1	0	0	1
9	DF	(Estonia)	5	Karol Mets	1	0	0	1
9	DF	(Finland)	16	Robin Tihi	1	0	0	1
9	MF	(Ghana)	8	Enoch Kofi Adu	1	0	0	1
9	MF	(Sweden)	22	Filip Rogić	1	0	0	1
9	MF	(Ghana)	17	Ebenezer Ofori	0	1	0	1
9	MF	(Sweden)	34	Erik Ring	0	0	1	1
9				Own goal	0	1	0	1
TOTALS					30	7	2	39

=== Clean sheets ===
Place	Position	Nation	Number	Name	Allsvenskan	2019–20 Svenska Cupen	2020–21 Svenska Cupen	Total
1	GK	(Serbia)	23	Budimir Janošević	8	1	0	9
2	GK	(Denmark)	31	Jakob Haugaard	4	0	0	4
TOTALS					12	1	0	13

=== Disciplinary record ===
Number	Nation	Position	Name	Allsvenskan		2019–20 Svenska Cupen		2020–21 Svenska Cupen		Total	
Number	Nation	Position	Name	Yellow card	Red card	Yellow card	Red card	Yellow card	Red card	Yellow card	Red card
3	(Sweden)	DF	Per Karlsson	3	1	0	1	0	0	3	2
4	(Sweden)	DF	Sotirios Papagiannopoulos	6	1	0	0	0	0	6	1
6	(Sweden)	MF	Panajotis Dimitriadis	1	0	0	0	0	0	1	0
7	(Sweden)	MF	Sebastian Larsson	8	0	0	0	0	0	8	0
8	(Ghana)	MF	Enoch Kofi Adu	5	0	0	0	0	0	5	0
9	(Iceland)	FW	Kolbeinn Sigþórsson	1	0	0	0	0	0	1	0
10	(Sweden)	MF	Nabil Bahoui	6	0	0	0	0	0	6	0
12	(Lebanon)	DF	Felix Michel	2	0	0	0	0	0	2	0
13	(Canada)	GK	Kyriakos Stamatopoulos	1	0	0	0	0	0	1	0
14	(Sweden)	FW	Paulos Abraham	1	0	2	1	0	0	3	1
16	(Finland)	DF	Robin Tihi	2	0	1	0	0	0	3	0
17	(Ghana)	MF	Ebenezer Ofori	5	1	0	0	0	0	5	1
18	(Sweden)	MF	Bilal Hussein	4	0	0	0	0	0	4	0
20	(Sweden)	DF	Rasmus Lindkvist	1	0	0	0	0	0	1	0
22	(Sweden)	MF	Filip Rogić	2	0	0	0	0	0	2	0
23	(Serbia)	GK	Budimir Janošević	1	0	0	0	0	0	1	0
25	(Kenya)	DF	Erick Otieno	1	0	1	0	0	0	2	0
29	(Sweden)	DF	Eric Kahl	6	0	0	0	0	0	6	0
31	(Denmark)	GK	Jakob Haugaard	0	0	1	0	0	0	1	0
32	(Sweden)	MF	Tom Strannegård	1	0	0	0	0	0	1	0
33	(Sweden)	DF	Mikael Lustig	1	0	0	0	0	0	1	0
36	(Eritrea)	FW	Henok Goitom	2	0	0	0	0	0	2	0
Players away on loan:
2	(Norway)	DF	Daniel Granli	2	0	0	0	0	0	2	0
Players who left AIK during the season:
5	(Estonia)	DF	Karol Mets	5	0	1	0	0	0	6	0
21	(Albania)	MF	Jasir Asani	0	0	1	0	0	0	1	0
Total				67	3	7	2	0	0	74	5
