= Jonas Olsson =

Jonas Olsson is the name of:

- Jonas Olsson (footballer, born 1970), Swedish football manager and former player
- Jonas Olsson (footballer, born 1983), Swedish footballer
- Jonas Olsson (footballer, born 1990), Swedish footballer
- Jonas Olsson (footballer, born 1994), Swedish footballer
- Jonas Olsson (cyclist), Swedish cyclist; competed at the 2002 European Road Championships
- Jonas Olsson (ice hockey), Swedish ice hockey player in 2011–12 GET-ligaen season
- Jonas Olsson (music producer), Finnish music producer, sound engineer and songwriter
