= Austin Agwata =

Nigerian footballer (born 2002)

Personal information
- Full name: Austin Agwata Kenechukwu
- Date of birth: 30 June 2002 (age 24)
- Place of birth: Enugu, Nigeria
- Height: 1.77 m (5 ft 10 in)
- Position: Forward

Youth career
- –2021: Topflight

Senior career*
Years	Team	Apps	(Gls)
2021	Minsk	9	(0)
2022	Haninge	11	(1)
2023	Tiszakécske	4	(1)
2023–2024	MFK Zvolen		
- * Club domestic league appearances and goals as of 7 June 2023

Austin Agwata (born 30 June 2002) is a Nigerian professional footballer.
