= Ferhad Ayaz =

Swedish footballer

Ferhat
Personal information
- Date of birth: 10 October 1994 (age 32)
- Place of birth: Nusaybin, Turkey
- Height: 1.78 m (5 ft 10 in)
- Position: Winger

Team information
- Current team: IFK Haninge
- Number: 17

Youth career
- Karlslunds IF HFK
- IFK Kristinehamn

Senior career*
Years	Team	Apps	(Gls)
2012–2014	Degerfors IF	56	(14)
2015–2016	Gaziantepspor	11	(0)
2016–2017	Örebro SK	19	(2)
2018–2019	Dalkurd FF	30	(4)
2019–2021	Degerfors IF	50	(4)
2022	Borac Banja Luka	10	(2)
2022–2023	IK Brage	9	(0)
2023–2024	Eendracht Aalst	21	(5)
2025–	IFK Haninge	7	(2)

International career
2013	Sweden U19	4	(0)
2014–2015	Sweden U21	7	(2)
- * Club domestic league appearances and goals as of 24 November 2025

Ferhat Ayaz (born Ferhat Ayaz; 10 October 1994) is a Swedish footballer who plays for IFK Haninge.

== Career ==
Ayaz, who came to Sweden when he was five years old, started playing football in Karlslunds IF HFK and played as a junior also for IFK Kristinehamn before joining Degerfors IF.

Ayaz started his professional career with Degerfors IF in Superettan, the Swedish second tier, where he made 56 appearances and scored 14 goals across two full seasons.

In 2015, he moved to Gaziantepspor in his country of birth. He made his Turkish Süper Lig debut on 31 January, but failed to impress and returned to his native country and Örebro SK in 2016.

In early 2018, he made another transfer, signing a four-year deal with fellow Allsvenskan club Dalkurd FF.

On 29 January 2022, Ayaz joined Borac Banja Luka in Bosnia and Herzegovina until the end of the season.
