= Maxime Sainte =

Swedish association football player (born 2001)

Personal information
- Full name: Maxime Joël Anne Marie Sainte
- Date of birth: October 25, 2001 (age 25)
- Place of birth: Sweden
- Position: Midfielder

Team information
- Current team: IFK Lidingö
- Number: 4

Youth career
- 2019–2020: AIK Stockholm

Senior career*
Years	Team	Apps	(Gls)
2020–	Oskarshamns AIK	26	(3)
2021–2022	Hammarby Talang FF	41	(4)
2023–2024	Varbergs BoIS	19	(0)
2025	Nacka FC	18	(3)
2026–	IFK Lidingö		
- * Club domestic league appearances and goals

Maxime Sainte (born October 25, 2001) is a Swedish footballer who plays for IFK Lidingö.

== Personal life ==
Sainte is of Algerian descent through his mother.
