= Jakob Haugaard =

Danish footballer (born 1992)

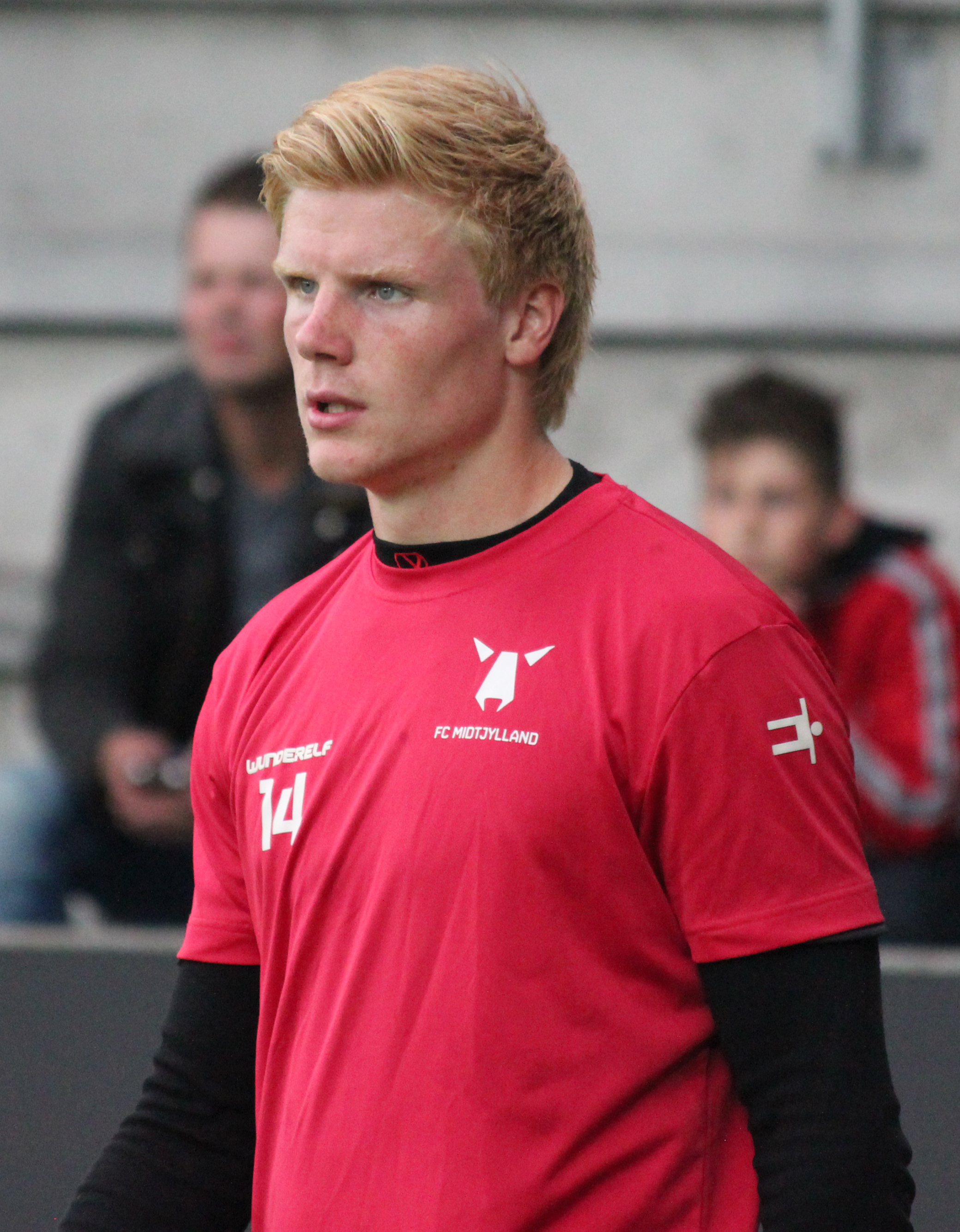
- Haugaard with Midtjylland in 2013

Personal information
- Full name: Jakob Let Haugaard
- Date of birth: 1 May 1992 (age 34)
- Place of birth: Sundby, Denmark
- Height: 1.99 m (6 ft 6 in)
- Position: Goalkeeper

Team information
- Current team: Tromsø
- Number: 1

Youth career
- Tårnby Boldklub
- Brøndby IF
- AB

Senior career*
Years	Team	Apps	(Gls)
2010–2011	AB	14	(0)
2011–2015	Midtjylland	30	(0)
2015–2019	Stoke City	5	(0)
2017	→ Wigan Athletic (loan)	8	(0)
2020–2022	AIK	14	(0)
2022	→ Tromsø (loan)	29	(0)
2023–	Tromsø	110	(0)

International career
2010	Denmark U-18	1	(0)
2012	Denmark U-20	2	(0)
- * Club domestic league appearances and goals as of 30 October 2026

Jakob Let Haugaard (born 1 May 1992) is a Danish professional footballer who plays as a goalkeeper for Tromsø.

Haugaard began his career with Akademisk BK before moving to Danish Superliga side Midtjylland in December 2011. He was used as back-up goalkeeper until the 2014–15 season where he helped Midtjylland win the Danish title. In the summer of 2015, Haugaard joined Premier League side Stoke City. Haugaard spent four seasons at Stoke and was used as third choice goalkeeper making only a handful of appearances. He also had a short loan spell at Wigan Athletic.

== Career ==
=== Midtjylland ===
Haugaard was born in Sundby and played in the youth teams at Tårnby Boldklub and Brøndby IF before he signed with Danish 1st Division side Akademisk BK in 2010. He broke through into the first team towards the end of the 2010–11 season playing 14 matches with the Gladsaxe Stadium club. His performances for AB attracted the interest of Danish Superliga side Midtjylland.

He signed for Midtjylland in December 2011. He spent the 2011–12 season with the reserve team. He made his Midtjylland debut on 27 July 2012 in a 2–2 draw away at AC Horsens. He went and played seven matches during the 2012–13 season. In 2013–14 he was used as back-up to Jonas Lössl and only made one appearance. The 2014–15 season was Haugaard's break-through season at Midtjylland as he played 23 times as the Wolves won their first Danish title.

=== Stoke City ===
On 27 May 2015, Haugaard signed a three-year contract with Premier League side Stoke City. Haugaard replaced compatriot Thomas Sørensen at the Britannia Stadium and Haugaard stated that he hopes to have the same impact as Sørensen. He made his debut for Stoke on 9 January 2016 in a 2–1 FA Cup victory away at Doncaster Rovers. Following a long-term injury to first choice goalkeeper Jack Butland, Haugaard was given his Premier League debut on 2 April 2016 in a 2–2 draw with Swansea City. He endured a tough time in his next match, away at Liverpool where he conceded four goals. He shared goalkeeper duties with Shay Given until the end of the 2015–16 season. Haugaard remained third choice goalkeeper at Stoke for the next three seasons and left the club at the end of the 2018–19 campaign.

==== Wigan Athletic (loan) ====
On 7 January 2017, Haugaard joined EFL Championship club Wigan Athletic on loan for the remainder of the 2016–17 season. He made his debut for Wigan on the same day in an FA Cup match against Nottingham Forest and saved a penalty as Wigan won 2–0. Haugaard was heavily criticised by Latics caretaker manager Graham Barrow following a 2–1 defeat at Brighton & Hove Albion on 17 April, describing the goals he conceded as "Sunday League" and admitting that he is only playing Haugaard because of the terms in the loan deal with Stoke. He returned to Stoke on 21 April 2017 after suffering a shoulder injury.

== Career statistics ==
As of 30 October 2026

Appearances and goals by club, season and competition
Club	Season	League			National cup (Note: Includes Danish Cup, FA Cup, Svenska Cupen, Norwegian Cup)		League Cup (Note: Includes EFL Cup)		Europe		Other		Total	
Club	Season	Division	Apps	Goals	Apps	Goals	Apps	Goals	Apps	Goals	Apps	Goals	Apps	Goals
AB	2010–11	Danish 1st Division	14	0	0	0	—		—		—		14	0
Midtjylland	2011–12	Danish Superliga	0	0	0	0	—		0	0	—		0	0
Midtjylland	2012–13	Danish Superliga	6	0	1	0	—		0	0	—		7	0
Midtjylland	2013–14	Danish Superliga	1	0	0	0	—		—		—		1	0
Midtjylland	2014–15	Danish Superliga	23	0	0	0	—		2 (Note: Appearances in UEFA Europa League)	0	—		25	0
Midtjylland	Total		30	0	1	0	—		2	0	—		33	0
Stoke City	2015–16	Premier League	5	0	2	0	0	0	—		—		7	0
Stoke City	2016–17	Premier League	0	0	0	0	0	0	—		—		0	0
Stoke City	2017–18	Premier League	0	0	0	0	0	0	—		—		0	0
Stoke City	2018–19	Championship	0	0	0	0	0	0	—		—		0	0
Stoke City	Total		5	0	2	0	0	0	—		—		7	0
Stoke City U23	2016–17	—	—		—		—		—		2 (Note: Appearances in EFL Trophy)	0	2	0
Stoke City U23	2017–18	—	—		—		—		—		2	0	2	0
Stoke City U23	2018–19	—	—		—		—		—		2	0	2	0
Stoke City U23	Total		—		—		—		—		6	0	6	0
Wigan Athletic (loan)	2016–17	Championship	8	0	2	0	0	0	—		—		10	0
AIK	2020	Allsvenskan	14	0	2	0	—		—		—		16	0
AIK	2021	Allsvenskan	0	0	0	0	—		—		—		0	0
AIK	Total		14	0	2	0	—		—		—		16	0
Tromsø (loan)	2022	Eliteserien	29	0	2	0	—		—		—		31	0
Tromsø	2023	Eliteserien	28	0	0	0	—		—		—		28	0
Tromsø	2024	Eliteserien	28	0	1	0	—		3 (Note: Appearances in UEFA Conference League)	0	—		32	0
Tromsø	2025	Eliteserien	30	0	0	0	—		—		—		30	0
Tromsø	2026	Eliteserien	24	0	2	0	—		6 (Note: Two Appearances in UEFA Europa League, and four appearances in UEFA Conference League)	0	—		32	0
Tromsø	Total		139	0	3	0	—		9	0	—		151	0
Career total			210	0	12	0	0	0	11	0	6	0	239	0

== Honours ==
Midtjylland

- Danish Superliga: 2014–15
