= August Ahlin =

Swedish footballer

Personal information
- Full name: August Per Arnold Ahlin
- Date of birth: 6 April 1997 (age 29)
- Height: 1.82 m (6 ft 0 in)
- Position: Goalkeeper

Youth career
- Djurgårdens IF

Senior career*
| Years | Team | Apps | (Gls) |
| 2017–2018 | Boo FK | 1 | (0) |
| 2018–2021 | Gamla Upsala SK | 73 | (0) |
| 2021–2022 | IK Sirius | 9 | (0) |
- * Club domestic league appearances and goals

August Per Arnold Ahlin (born 6 April 1997) is a Swedish former football goalkeeper.
