= Jaheem Burke =

Swedish footballer (born 2001)

Personal information
- Date of birth: 19 August 2001 (age 25)
- Place of birth: Kingston, Jamaica
- Height: 1.82 m (6 ft 0 in)
- Position: Winger

Team information
- Current team: IFK Haninge
- Number: 17

Youth career
- Rågsveds IF
- Hammarby IF
- IFK Haninge
- 2019–2020: UCAM Murcia

Senior career*
Years	Team	Apps	(Gls)
2018–2019	IFK Haninge	12	(1)
2020	Fagersta Södra IK	1	(0)
2020	Rågsveds IF	9	(5)
2021	Hammarby TFF	23	(6)
2022	Varbergs BoIS	7	(1)
2022	→ Varbergs GIF (loan)	1	(1)
2022	→ Norrby IF (loan)	16	(5)
2023	Västerås SK	19	(4)
2024–2025	Spartak Trnava	1	(0)
2024	→ Utsiktens BK (loan)	4	(0)
2025	IFK Haninge	0	(0)
2025	Kormákur/Hvöt	11	(1)
2025–	IFK Haninge	1	(0)
- * Club domestic league appearances and goals as of 24 November 2025

Jaheem Burke (born 19 August 2001) is a Swedish footballer who plays for IFK Haninge as a winger.

== Club career ==
Burke was born in Jamaica. He moved with his father to Sweden at the age of 11, and took up football, with which he had little acquaintance until then. Burke joined the youth sector of Rågsveds IF. Moving to Hammarby IF and then IFK Haninge, an assist made by Burke in an U19 match went viral with 5 million views through the Dutch Instagram outlet 433.

Burke made his senior debut for Haninge in 2018 before spending time in Spain with UCAM Murcia during the 2019–20 season. He returned to Sweden for the postponed start of the 2020 season, joining Division 3 team Fagersta Södra IK. After only one game, he joined childhood team Rågsved. Three of his goals in the Rågsved jersey came as a hat-trick.

In 2021 he played his first full season in senior football, scoring 6 times for Hammarby Talang FF. Burke was therefore picked up by Allsvenskan sophomores Varbergs BoIS ahead of the 2022 season. Burke signed four-year deal. He made his Allsvenskan debut on 10 April 2022 against Kalmar. His first Allsvenskan goal came against Häcken in May 2022. During the course of the autumn, he was loaned out to Norrby IF where he made his debut in Superettan.

Ahead of the 2023 season he went on to Superettan team Västerås SK. In the summer of 2023 he was temporarily sidelined because of EKG irregularities and fear of a heart condition. After helping win the 2023 Superettan, Burke was sold to FC Spartak Trnava, for whom he signed a two-and-a-half year contract in January 2024. In February 2024 Burke made his Slovak First League debut for Trnava, in February 2024 in a 1–0 away loss against Ružomberok. He made a permanent transfer back to Sweden ahead of the 2025 season, joining newcomers to the Swedish third tier, IFK Haninge.

== Personal life ==
In 2024, Burke stated his desire to choose Jamaica over Sweden, should he be called up to play internationally.
