= Filip Bohman =

Swedish footballer

Personal information
- Full name: Filip Magnus Bohman
- Date of birth: 24 November 1996 (age 29)
- Height: 1.86 m (6 ft 1 in)
- Position: Striker

Team information
- Current team: AFC Malmö
- Number: 9

Youth career
- Skurups AIF

Senior career*
Years	Team	Apps	(Gls)
–2018	Skurups AIF		
2019	BK Olympic	20	(9)
2020–2021	Lunds BK	54	(12)
2022	BK Olympic	17	(15)
2022	Varbergs BoIS	12	(1)
2023–2026	Trelleborgs FF	79	(15)
2026–	AFC Malmö	15	(6)
- * Club domestic league appearances and goals as of 16 November 2026

Filip Bohman (born 24 November 1996) is a Swedish footballer who plays as a striker for Ettan Fotboll club AFC Malmö.

Described as a late bloomer, Bohman started his youth career in Skurups AIF and also played senior football for the club, except for a hiatus from football before the age of 20. Following a good season in the 2018 Division 5, the seventh tier in Sweden, he was picked up by BK Olympic.

9 goals in the 2019 Division 2 led to him moving up one additional tier, to Lunds BK in the Division 1. After a goalless 2020 he scored 12 times in the 2021 Ettan. Ahead of the 2022 season he returned to BK Olympic.

By June 2022, Bohman had scored 15 goals in 14 games in the 2022 Ettan. Several clubs were interested in signing him. He was announced as a new signing by Allsvenskan's Varbergs BoIS. Varberg then decided to buy Bohman immediately, rather than waiting to the winter transfer window. He stopped at 15 goals in 17 games for Olympic.

Bohman scored his first Allsvenskan goal in October 2022 against Häcken. He only remained for half a season in Varberg, however. Ahead of the 2023 season he signed for Superettan team Trelleborgs FF. Among his notable goals in Trelleborg was two goals in the 3–2 away victory over Skövde in May 2023, and one goal in the 2–1 away victory over Örgryte in May 2024.
