= Bojan Radulović (footballer) =

Serbian footballer (born 1999)

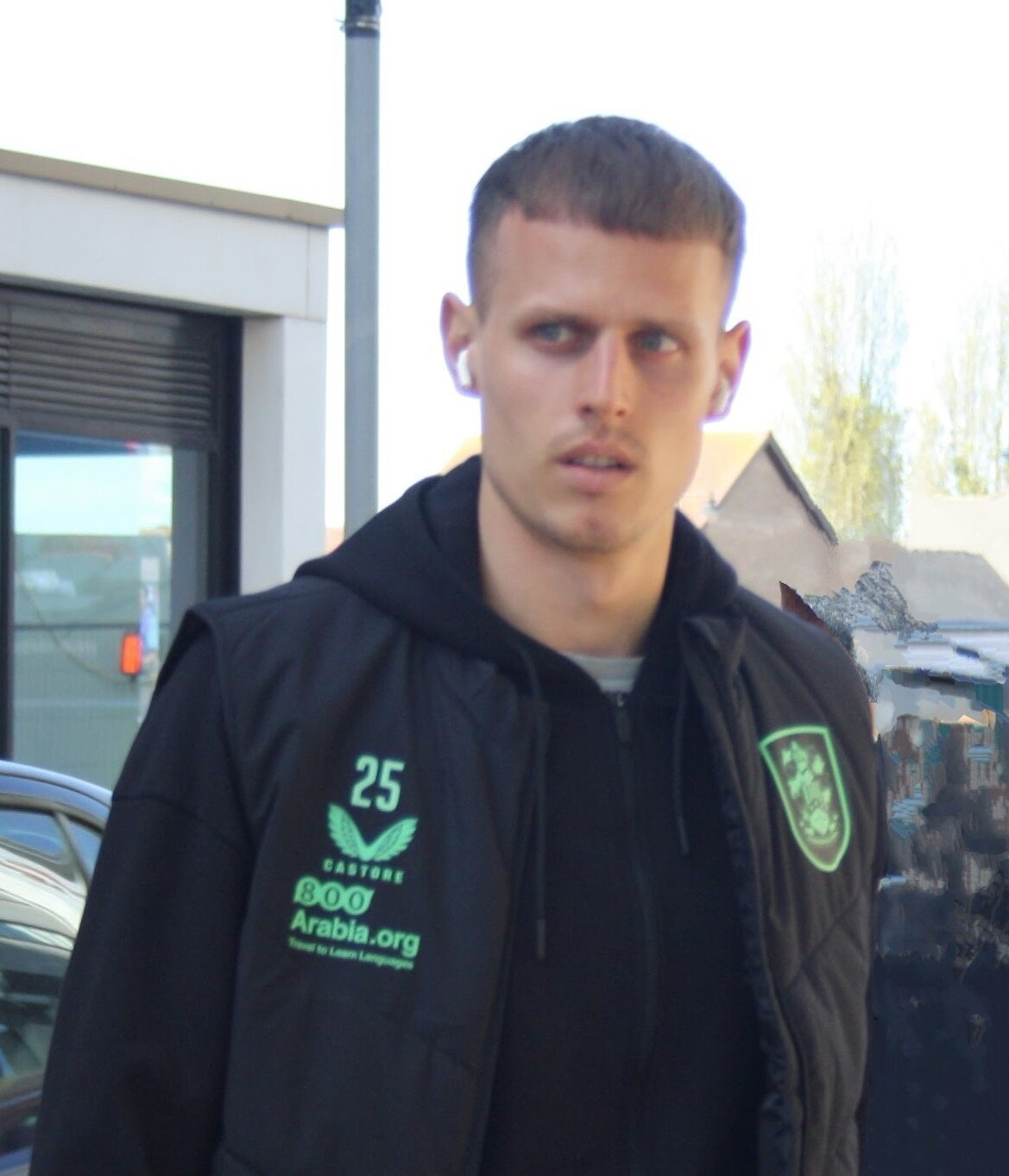
- Radulović in 2026

Personal information
- Full name: Bojan Radulović-Samouković
- Date of birth: 29 December 1999 (age 26)
- Place of birth: Lleida, Spain
- Height: 1.91 m (6 ft 3 in)
- Position: Striker

Team information
- Current team: Huddersfield Town
- Number: 25

Youth career
- –2017: Lleida Esportiu
- 2018–2020: Brighton & Hove Albion

Senior career*
Years	Team	Apps	(Gls)
2017–2018	Lleida Esportiu	13	(1)
2018–2020	Brighton & Hove Albion	0	(0)
2018–2019	→ Espanyol B (loan)	8	(1)
2020	→ Alavés B (loan)	6	(0)
2020–2022	AIK	29	(3)
2022	→ HJK (loan)	15	(5)
2022–2023	HJK	32	(21)
2024–	Huddersfield Town	60	(13)
2025	→ Fortuna Sittard (loan)	11	(1)

International career
2018	Serbia U19	2	(0)
- * Club domestic league appearances and goals as of 17 October 2026

Bojan Radulović-Samouković (Serbian Cyrillic: Бојан Радуловић-Самоуковић; born 29 December 1999) is a professional footballer who plays as a striker for EFL League One club Huddersfield Town. Born in Spain, he has represented Serbia at under-19 level.

== Career ==
=== Lleida Esportiu ===
Radulović started to play football for a local club Lleida Esportiu in Spain. He played in the club's youth sector before making his senior debut with the first team in 2017 in the Spanish third tier.

He gained a relatively wide recognition on 29 November 2017, when he scored the winning goal in the Copa del Rey round of 32 match against La Liga club Real Sociedad, after coming in as a substitute. The match ended in a 3–2 win for Lleida.

=== Brighton and loans ===
On 1 February 2018, Radulović signed for English Premier League side Brighton for an undisclosed fee, and was registered to their youth academy. He played 22 matches for the club's youth team in Premier League 2 and scored eight goals in total.

On 28 August 2018, he was sent on loan to Spanish third division club Espanyol B.

On 31 January 2020, he was sent on loan to Alavés B in the Spanish third division.

=== AIK ===
On 17 August 2020, Radulović signed for Swedish team AIK on a free transfer. And on 7 February 2021, in a friendly game against Örebro SK, he scored his first goal in AIK, followed later by another goal by him.

He was unable to make a major breakthrough in AIK, and was mainly deployed as a late substitute, recording only two full 90-minute appearances in Allsvenskan.

=== HJK ===
On 15 February 2022, Radulović joined HJK in Finland on a loan deal until the end of July 2022.

In July HJK bought Radulović from AIK for a rumoured fee of €150,000, and initially signed with him on a deal until the end of 2023 season, subsequently extended until the end of 2024. During the 2022 Veikkausliiga season, Radulovic recorded eight goals in the league, the most in the team, as HJK renewed the title for the third consecutive year. Radulovic also scored two goals in the club's European campaign, where HJK qualified for the 2022–23 UEFA Europa League group stage, but he missed most of the UEL games due to injury.

Radulović scored a hat-trick in eleven minutes after coming on as a substitute in a 3–1 away win against Inter Turku in the league, on 20 August 2023. He scored 18 goals in 24 league games during the 2023 Veikkausliiga season, earning himself the golden boot as HJK won the league for the fourth straight season. In an interview with Ilta Sanomat, he explained that he had adjusted better to Helsinki and the team and felt he was in much better shape and more confident than the first season, saying: "Now I remain cool after a poor performance and I know I will score in the next."

On 31 August 2023, Radulović scored a brace against Farul Constanta in the decisive 2nd leg of the 2023-24 UEFA Europa Conference League play-off round, leading HJK to a 2–0 victory (3–2 aggregate) and securing a spot in the group stage. He also scored HJK's only goal as the team drew 1–1 to Aberdeen FC away in the Conference League. Radulovic finished the HJK's 2023–24 European campaign scoring a total of six goals in 13 matches, including scoring three times in the group stage.

=== Huddersfield Town ===
On 5 January 2024, Radulović signed with EFL Championship club Huddersfield Town on a three-and-a-half-year deal for an undisclosed fee, rumoured to be €1.4 million. Two days later, on 7 January 2024, Radulović made his debut for the club, as a substitute in a FA Cup defeat against Manchester City at the Etihad Stadium. On 1 April 2024, Radulović scored his first goal for Huddersfield in Championship, in a 1–1 away draw against Stoke City. However, the club were relegated to EFL League One at the end of the season.

On 4 February 2025, he joined Eredivisie club Fortuna Sittard on loan for the remainder of the season.

== Personal life ==
He is dating Spanish top model Laura Simon de Clair. He is the son of former footballer Radoslav Radulović, who played for Lleida.

== Career statistics ==
As of 25 August 2026

Appearances and goals by club, season and competition
Club	Season	League			National cup (Note: Includes Copa del rey, Svenska Cupen, Suomen Cup, FA Cup)		League cup (Note: Includes Finnish League Cup, EFL Cup)		Continental		Other		Total	
Club	Season	Division	Apps	Goals	Apps	Goals	Apps	Goals	Apps	Goals	Apps	Goals	Apps	Goals
Lleida Esportiu	2017–18	Segunda División B	13	1	5	1	—		—		0	0	18	2
Brighton & Hove Albion	2017–18	Premier League	0	0	0	0	0	0	—		0	0	0	0
Brighton & Hove Albion	2018–19	Premier League	0	0	0	0	0	0	—		0	0	0	0
Brighton & Hove Albion	2019–20	Premier League	0	0	0	0	0	0	—		3 (Note: Appearances in the EFL Trophy)	1	3	1
Brighton & Hove Albion	Total		0	0	0	0	0	0	0	0	3	1	3	1
Espanyol B (loan)	2018–19	Segunda División B	8	1	—		—		—		—		8	1
Alavés B (loan)	2019–20	Segunda División B	6	0	—		—		—		—		6	0
AIK	2020	Allsvenskan	3	0	0	0	—		—		—		3	0
AIK	2021	Allsvenskan	26	3	1	0	—		—		—		27	3
AIK	2022	Allsvenskan	0	0	1	1	—		0	0	—		1	1
AIK	Total		29	3	1	0	0	0	0	0	0	0	31	4
HJK (loan)	2022	Veikkausliiga	15	5	2	0	2	1	—		—		19	6
HJK	2022	Veikkausliiga	8	3	—		—		9 (Note: Includes UEFA Champions League and UEFA Europa League)	2	—		17	5
HJK	2023	Veikkausliiga	24	18	1	0	4	1	13 (Note: Includes UEFA Champions League, UEFA Europa League and UEFA Europa Conference League)	6	—		42	25
HJK	Total		47	26	3	0	6	2	22	8	0	0	78	36
Huddersfield Town	2023–24	Championship	11	1	1	0	0	0	—		0	0	12	1
Huddersfield Town	2024–25	League One	17	1	1	0	0	0	–		3	0	21	1
Huddersfield Town	2025–26	League One	23	8	1	1	2	0	—		3	0	28	9
Huddersfield Town	2026–27	League One	2	1	0	0	0	0	–		0	0	2	1
Huddersfield Town	Total		53	11	3	1	2	0	0	0	6	0	63	12
Fortuna Sittard (loan)	2024–25	Eredivisie	10	1	–		–		–		–		10	1
Career total			194	45	15	3	8	2	24	8	7	1	252	59

== Honours ==
AIK

- Allsvenskan runner-up: 2021

HJK

- Veikkausliiga: 2022, 2023
- Finnish League Cup: 2023

Individual

- Veikkausliiga top scorer: 2023
- Sports Journalists: Veikkausliiga Team of the Year 2023
