= Bilal Hussein (footballer) =

Swedish footballer

Personal information
- Date of birth: 22 April 2000 (age 26)
- Place of birth: Stockholm, Sweden
- Height: 1.75 m (5 ft 9 in)
- Position: Midfielder

Team information
- Current team: Degerfors
- Number: 8

Youth career
- 2007–2014: Bromstens IK
- 2014–2018: AIK

Senior career*
Years	Team	Apps	(Gls)
2018–2023	AIK	114	(4)
2018	→ Vasalunds IF (loan)	7	(0)
2023–2025	Hertha BSC	17	(1)
2024–2025	Hertha BSC II	15	(0)
2026–	Degerfors	5	(0)

International career^{‡}
2017–2018	Sweden U19	12	(0)
2019–2022	Sweden U21	19	(2)
2023	Sweden	2	(0)
- * Club domestic league appearances and goals as of 17 July 2026 ‡ National team caps and goals as of 21:41, 13 January 2023 (UTC)

Bilal Hussein (born 22 April 2000) is a Swedish footballer who plays as a midfielder for Allsvenskan side Degerfors. He has been capped twice for the Sweden national team.

== Club career ==
Hussein began playing football with his local club Bromstens IK at the age of 7, and joined the AIK youth academy in 2014. On 20 January 2018, Hussein signed his first professional contract with AIK, keeping him at the club until 2021. He made his professional debut for AIK in a 2–0 Allsvenskan win over IK Sirius on 27 April 2018.

On 30 August 2023, Hussein signed a three-year contract with Hertha BSC in Germany.

== International career ==
Hussein was born in Sweden to Somali parents. He is a youth international for Sweden. He made his full international debut for Sweden on 9 January 2023, replacing Hugo Larsson 68 minutes into a friendly 2–0 win against Finland.

== Career statistics ==
=== Club ===
As of match played 6 November 2022

Appearances and goals by club, season and competition
Club	Season	League			National Cup		Continental		Total	
Club	Season	Division	Apps	Goals	Apps	Goals	Apps	Goals	Apps	Goals
AIK	2017	Allsvenskan	0	0	0	0	—		0	0
AIK	2018	Allsvenskan	1	0	1	0	—		2	0
AIK	2019	Allsvenskan	16	0	3	0	—		19	0
AIK	2020	Allsvenskan	25	2	4	1	3	0	32	3
AIK	2021	Allsvenskan	30	1	3	0	0	0	33	1
AIK	2022	Allsvenskan	24	1	5	0	6	0	43	1
AIK	Total		96	4	16	1	9	0	129	5
Career total			96	4	16	1	9	0	129	5

=== International ===
Appearances and goals by national team and year
National team	Year	Apps	Goals
Sweden	2023	2	0
Total		2	0
