= Andreas Bengtsson =

Swedish footballer

Personal information
- Full name: Andreas Bengtsson
- Date of birth: 22 February 1996 (age 30)
- Place of birth: Sweden
- Height: 1.88 m (6 ft 2 in)
- Position: Left-back

Youth career
- –2009: Oskarströms IS
- 2009–2014: Halmstads BK

Senior career*
Years	Team	Apps	(Gls)
2015–2022	Halmstads BK	178	(3)
2023	HB Køge	15	(0)

International career
2014–2016	Sweden U19	11	(0)
- * Club domestic league appearances and goals as of 17 June 2023

Andreas Bengtsson (born 22 February 1996) is a Swedish footballer. (Note: Andreas Bengtsson at Soccerway (archived). Retrieved 24 April 2023.)
