= Samuel Kroon =

Swedish footballer

Personal information
- Full name: Samuel Karl Johan Kroon
- Date of birth: 28 November 1996 (age 29)
- Height: 1.86 m (6 ft 1 in)
- Position: Midfielder

Team information
- Current team: Knattspyrnufélag Akureyrar
- Number: 17

Youth career
- IK Bele

Senior career*
Years	Team	Apps	(Gls)
2015	Bele Barkarby FF		
2016–2018	Nyköpings BIS	62	(6)
2019	Umeå FC	27	(9)
2020–2022	Halmstads BK	62	(12)
2023	IF Brommapojkarna	12	(1)
2023–2026	Örebro	61	(6)
2026–	Knattspyrnufélag Akureyrar	12	(0)
- * Club domestic league appearances and goals as of 16 November 2026

Samuel Kroon (born 28 November 1996) is a Swedish professional footballer who plays as a midfielder for Besta deild karla club Knattspyrnufélag Akureyrar.
