= Abdussalam Magashy =

Nigerian footballer

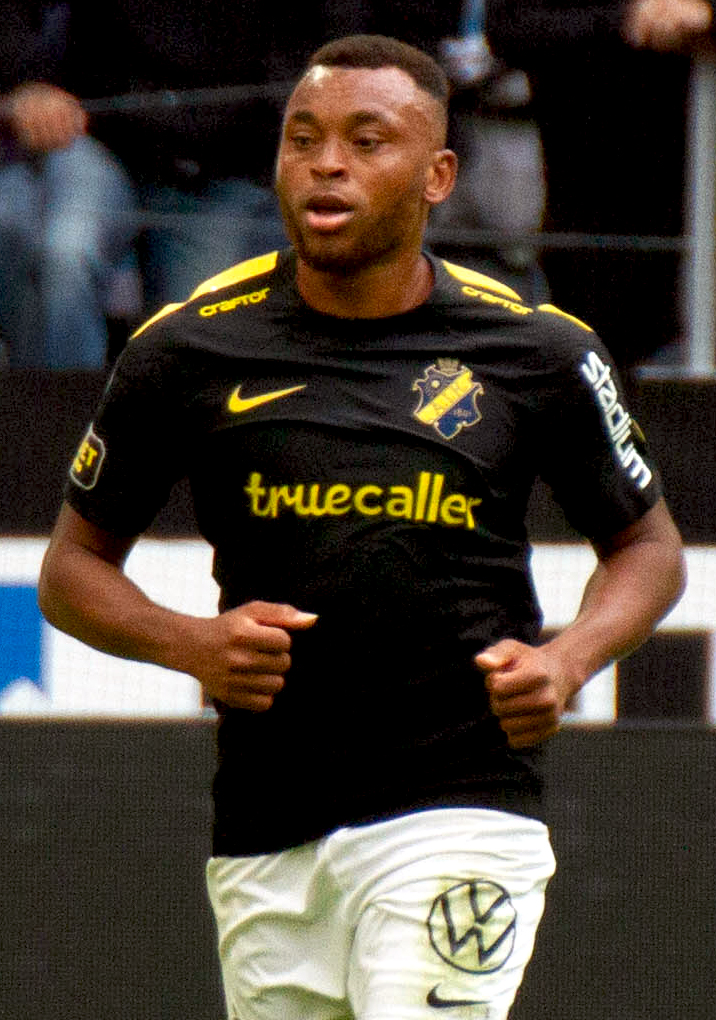
- Magashy at AIK in 2023.

Personal information
- Full name: Abdussalam Muhammad Magashy
- Date of birth: 6 April 1998 (age 28)
- Place of birth: Kano, Nigeria
- Height: 1.76 m (5 ft 9 in)
- Position: Attacking midfielder

Team information
- Current team: Kalmar FF
- Number: 21

Youth career
- FC Heart

Senior career*
| Years | Team | Apps | (Gls) |
| 2018 | Växjö United FC | 11 | (2) |
| 2018–2019 | Kristianstad FC | 37 | (7) |
| 2020–2022 | IFK Värnamo | 82 | (13) |
| 2023 | AIK | 15 | (2) |
| 2024– | Kalmar FF | 54 | (5) |
- * Club domestic league appearances and goals as of 8 July 2026

Abdussalam Magashy (born 6 April 1998) is a Nigerian footballer who plays as an attacking midfielder for Kalmar FF.

== Career ==
Magashy started his career in Nigerian club FC Heart. In 2018 he moved to Sweden, joining lowly Växjö United. Already after half a season he moved to Division 1 club Kristianstad FC. His breakthrough came in IFK Värnamo, where he participated in back-to-back promotions from the 2020 Division 1 and 2021 Superettan. As Magashy played every game of Värnamo's maiden 2022 Allsvenskan campaign, he caught the attention of bigger clubs.

Ahead of the 2023 season, Magashy was signed by AIK as a starter. As AIK changed managers in the running of the 2023 Allsvenskan, Magashy was benched for the first time in his career. He was reportedly discussed as a new signing in several Swedish and Norwegian clubs, He ended up joining Kalmar FF. The 2024 Allsvenskan ended in relegation.
