= Emil Hellman =

Swedish footballer (born 2001)

Personal information
- Date of birth: 20 April 2001 (age 25)
- Place of birth: Helsingborg, Sweden
- Height: 1.83 m (6 ft 0 in)
- Positions: Left-back; centre-back

Team information
- Current team: Varbergs BoIS
- Number: 5

Youth career
- Högaborgs BK
- Helsingborgs IF

Senior career*
Years	Team	Apps	(Gls)
2020–2023	Helsingborgs IF	34	(0)
2022	→ Ängelholms FF (loan)	4	(0)
2024	Næstved	14	(0)
2024–	Varbergs BoIS	65	(1)
- * Club domestic league appearances and goals as of 11 November 2026

Emil Hellman (born 20 April 2001) is a Swedish footballer who plays as a defender for Varbergs BoIS.

== Career ==
On 1 February 2024, Hellman joined Danish 1st Division side Næstved Boldklub. He left Næstved at the end of the season, which ended with relegation to the 2024-25 Danish 2nd Division.
