= Jakob Voelkerling Persson =

Swedish footballer (born 2000)

Personal information
- Full name: Jakob Axel Krister Voelkerling Persson
- Date of birth: 27 September 2000 (age 26)
- Place of birth: Trelleborg, Sweden
- Height: 1.92 m (6 ft 4 in)
- Position: Centre-back

Team information
- Current team: Helsingborgs IF
- Number: 3

Youth career
- Trelleborgs FF
- –2019: Helsingborgs IF

Senior career*
Years	Team	Apps	(Gls)
2019–2022	Helsingborgs IF	16	(0)
2022	→ Ängelholms FF (loan)	2	(0)
2022–2025	IK Sirius	74	(2)
2026–	Helsingborgs IF	26	(1)
- * Club domestic league appearances and goals as of 12 November 2026

Jakob Axel Krister Voelkerling Persson (born 27 September 2000) is a Swedish footballer who plays as a defender for Helsingborgs IF.

== Career ==
He started his career with Helsingborgs IF.

On 13 January 2026, Voelkerling Persson moved back to play for Helsingborgs IF on a two-year contract.
