= Robin Tihi =

Footballer (born 2002)

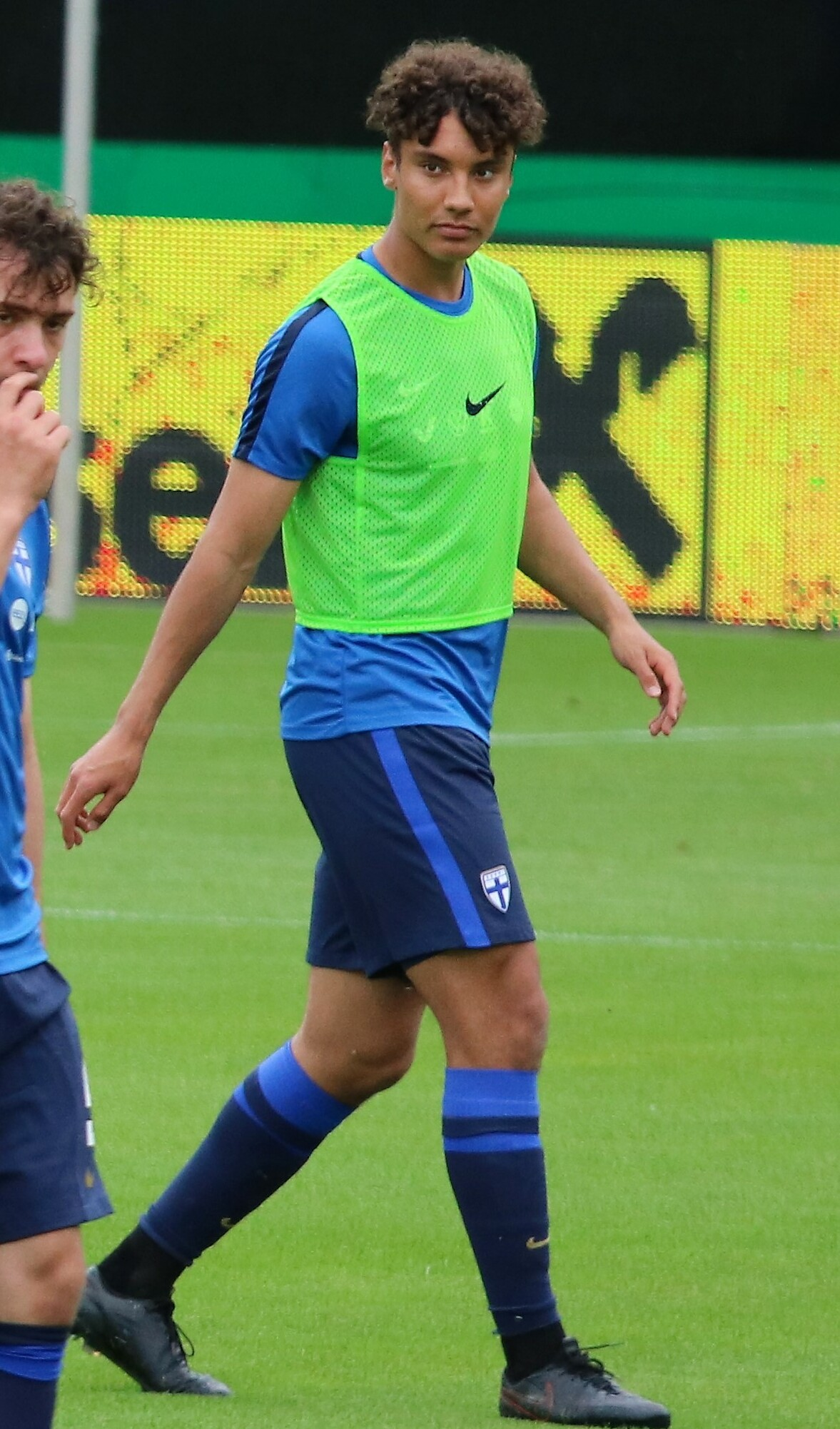
- Tihi in 2022

Personal information
- Full name: Robin Amin Tihi
- Date of birth: 16 March 2002 (age 24)
- Place of birth: Danderyd, Sweden
- Height: 1.85 m (6 ft 1 in)
- Position: Centre-back

Team information
- Current team: Al Ahli
- Number: 16

Youth career
- 2007–2014: Vasalunds IF
- 2014–2020: AIK

Senior career*
Years	Team	Apps	(Gls)
2020–2023	AIK	26	(1)
2021	→ AFC Eskilstuna (loan)	28	(2)
2022	→ IFK Värnamo (loan)	28	(0)
2023–	Al Ahli Doha	50	(3)

International career^{‡}
2018	Sweden U16	3	(0)
2020–2023	Finland U21	22	(0)
2023	Finland	1	(0)
- * Club domestic league appearances and goals as of 17 January 2026 ‡ National team caps and goals as of 20 June 2023

Robin Amin Tihi (born 16 March 2002) is a professional footballer who plays as a centre-back for Qatar Stars League club Al Ahli. Born in Sweden, Tihi represented Finland internationally.

== Club career ==
=== Early career and AIK ===
Tihi began playing football in the youth sector of Vasalunds IF in 2007. In 2014, he joined the youth academy of AIK.

Tihi made his senior debut with AIK first team in Allsvenskan in the 2020 season, ultimately making 13 league appearances in the season and scoring once.

For the 2021 season, he was loaned out to Superettan club AFC Eskilstuna.

On 26 January 2022, Tihi joined Värnamo on a season-long loan.

=== Al Ahli ===
On 14 August 2023, Tihi left AIK after signing a five-year deal with Qatar Stars League club Al-Ahli Doha, for a reported fee of €1.7 million. He made his debut on September 29, 2023, scoring in a 4–2 win over Muaither. He went on to play 18 matches in the league that season, scoring two goals as Al Ahli finished in 10th place, just outside the relegation zone.

== International career ==
Tihi is eligible to represent Finland, Sweden and Morocco. He originally represented the Sweden U16s, before switching to represent the Finland U21 national team.

Tihi made his full international debut for Finland senior national team on 12 January 2023, playing the full 90 minutes in a 1–0 friendly loss against Estonia.

On 19 November 2023, it was reported in Finnish media, that Tihi had declined an invitation to the Finland U21 for the 2025 UEFA Euro under-21 championship qualifying matches.

== Personal life ==
Tihi was born in Sweden to a Finnish mother and Moroccan father. He attended the Finnish school in Stockholm and speaks Finnish fluently. His younger sister Bianca has played football in AIK youth team, and represented Sweden and Morocco at youth international level.

== Career statistics ==
=== Club ===
As of 29 May 2025

Appearances and goals by club, season and competition
Club	Season	League			National cup (Note: Includes Svenska Cupen and Emir of Qatar Cup)		League cup (Note: Includes Qatari Stars Cup)		Continental		Other		Total	
Club	Season	Division	Apps	Goals	Apps	Goals	Apps	Goals	Apps	Goals	Apps	Goals	Apps	Goals
AIK	2020	Allsvenskan	13	1	3	0	—		—		—		16	1
AIK	2021	Allsvenskan	0	0	3	0	—		—		—		3	0
AIK	2022	Allsvenskan	0	0	0	0	—		0	0	—		0	0
AIK	2023	Allsvenskan	13	0	3	0	—		—		—		16	0
AIK	Total		26	1	9	0	0	0	0	0	0	0	35	1
AFC Eskilstuna (loan)	2021	Superettan	28	2	1	0	—		—		—		29	2
IFK Värnamo (loan)	2022	Allsvenskan	28	0	2	0	—		—		—		30	0
Al Ahli Doha	2023–24	Qatar Stars League	18	2	0	0	5	1	—		—		23	3
Al Ahli Doha	2024–25	Qatar Stars League	22	1	3	0	6	0	—		1 (Note: Includes Qatar Cup)	0	32	1
Al Ahli Doha	Total		40	3	3	0	11	1	0	0	1	0	55	4
Career total			120	6	15	0	11	1	0	0	1	0	147	7

=== International ===
As of 12 January 2023

National team	Year	Competitive		Friendly		Total	
National team	Year	Apps	Goals	Apps	Goals	Apps	Goals
Finland	2023	0	0	1	0	1	0
Total		0	0	1	0	1	0
