= Niklas Dahlström =

Swedish footballer

Personal information
- Full name: Niklas Birger Dahlström
- Date of birth: 28 May 1997 (age 29)
- Height: 1.93 m (6 ft 4 in)
- Position: Defender

Team information
- Current team: Varbergs BoIS
- Number: 22

Youth career
- Strands IF

Senior career*
Years	Team	Apps	(Gls)
2015	Strands IF	12	(0)
2016–2020	Hudiksvalls FF	93	(3)
2020–2022	GIF Sundsvall	62	(3)
2022	→ Jönköpings Södra IF (loan)	11	(1)
2023–	Varbergs BoIS	104	(6)
- * Club domestic league appearances and goals as of 11 November 2026

Niklas Dahlström (born 28 May 1997) is a Swedish footballer who plays as a defender for Varbergs BoIS in Superettan.

== Career ==
Dahlström started his youth career in Strands IF and played senior football for them in 2015. Then followed four seasons in Hudiksvalls FF in Division 2. In 2020, Hudiksvalls FF's league was suspended due to the pandemic. In June 2020, Dahlström joined GIF Sundsvall to be able to play on a higher level. He made his Superettan debut later that month against Dalkurd, and after GIF Sundsvall were promoted from the 2021 Superettan, he made his Allsvenskan debut in April 2022 against Sirius.

In early 2022 Dahlström missed 7 matches after sustaining a broken scaphoid bone. For Dahlström, it was demoralizing not to be able to play football with a hand injury. He also lost his place in the team. He joined Jönköpings Södra IF on loan in August 2022, to play the remainder of 2022, and J-Södra later wanted to retain him. Instead, Dahlström left GIF Sundsvall (who had been relegated to Superettan) for Allsvenskan club Varbergs BoIS.
