= Jonas Olsson (footballer, born 1994) =

Swedish footballer

Personal information
- Full name: Jonas Helmer Olsson
- Date of birth: 14 September 1994 (age 32)
- Height: 1.88 m (6 ft 2 in)
- Position: Goalkeeper

Team information
- Current team: GIF Sundsvall
- Number: 1

Youth career
- BKV Norrtälje
- –2014: AIK

Senior career*
Years	Team	Apps	(Gls)
2014	→ IK Frej (loan)	0	(0)
2015	IK Frej	0	(0)
2015	→ Sollentuna FK (loan)	11	(0)
2016–2018	Sollentuna FK	81	(0)
2019	IK Frej	22	(0)
2020–2022	IF Brommapojkarna	53	(0)
2023	Degerfors IF	6	(0)
2024–	GIF Sundsvall	86	(0)
- * Club domestic league appearances and goals as of 12 November 2026

Jonas Olsson (born 14 September 1994) is a Swedish footballer who plays as a goalkeeper for GIF Sundsvall in Superettan. He made his breakthrough in IF Brommapojkarna with back-to-back promotions from the 2021 Ettan and 2022 Superettan, and has played for Degerfors IF in Allsvenskan.

== Career ==
Olsson began his career in BKV Norrtälje and joined the youth system of AIK. He was not given a chance in their senior ranks, and made his way up through smaller clubs from the Stockholm area; Sollentuna FK, IK Frej and IF Brommapojkarna.

Olsson was the backup goalkeeper at Brommapojkarna in 2020, but felt the situation "strengthened him mentally". In 2021 he became first choice under a new manager, and kept several clean sheets. Brommapojkarna won promotion from the 2021 Ettan, with Olsson conceding only 18 goals and keeping 17 clean sheets. He was awarded the Ettan Goalkeeper of the Year title.

Brommapojkarna won another promotion from the 2022 Superettan, but Olsson's contract expired. He instead signed with BP's Allsvenskan competitor Degerfors IF. His ascent to the highest league in Sweden was described as "winding".

Starting the 2023 season as backup for Sondre Rossbach, the latter was criticized after a string of heavy losses. Olsson subsequently made his Allsvenskan debut in May 2023 against AIK. Following Degerfors' relegation, he signed a three-year contract with another Superettan team GIF Sundsvall.
