= IFK Haninge =

Swedish football club

- Full name: Idrottsföreningen Kamraterna Haninge
- Founded: 10 October 2004; 21 years ago
- Ground: Torvalla IP; Haninge, Stockholm
- Chairman: Aldo Sartori Diaz
- Head coach: Erkan Zengin
- League: Ettan Norra
- 2024: Div 2 Södra Svealand, 1st
Home colours	Away colours

IFK Haninge is a Swedish football club located in Haninge in Stockholm County.

== Background ==
Since their foundation Brandbergens IF is now IFK Haninge and has participated mainly in the lower divisions of the Swedish football league system. The club currently plays in Division 2 Södra Svealand which is the 4th tier of Swedish football. Next year the will play in Division 1 north. They play their home matches at the Torvalla IP in Haninge, Stockholm.

Brandbergens IF are affiliated to Stockholms Fotbollförbund.

Before the 2012 season, Brandbergens IF merged into one club called IFK Haninge. After 2015 season it was announced that the team will be renamed from IFK Haninge-Brandbergen to just IFK Haninge with a new team logo.

== Current squad ==
As of 1 September 2025 Note: Flags indicate national team as defined under FIFA eligibility rules; some limited exceptions apply. Players may hold more than one non-FIFA nationality.

No.	Pos.	Nation	Player
1	GK	SWE	Cem Alpek
2	DF	SWE	Kalle Selin Stregart
3	DF	SWE	Filip Nieminen Eriksson
4	DF	TUN	Adam Ben Lamin
5	DF	SWE	Sitapha Ndure
6	MF	EST	Oliver Cekredzi
6	MF	TUR	Furkan Malak (on loan from Göztepe)
7	FW	SWE	Maximilian Djene
8	DF	SWE	Vincent Sundberg
9	FW	SYR	Abdulmannan Khalil
10	MF	SWE	Oliver Kass Kawo
10	FW	SWE	Erkan Zengin
11	FW	SWE	Pa Dibba
12	MF	SWE	Hadi Noori

No.	Pos.	Nation	Player
13	MF	SWE	Ludvig Lundvall
14	MF	SWE	Mattias Bouvin
15	DF	SWE	Christian Pelenda
16	MF	SWE	Ahmet Tuhral
17	FW	SWE	Jaheem Burke
18	FW	SWE	Ferhad Ayaz
19	FW	SWE	Jonathan Tesfay Habte
20	FW	SWE	Nikolay Staykov
21	MF	SRI	Adhavan Rajamohan
22	MF	SWE	William Miguel
23	MF	ITA	Mursal Banse
25	GK	SUI	Tyron Zecchin
—	MF	SWE	Alexander Lindgren

=== Out on loan ===
Note: Flags indicate national team as defined under FIFA eligibility rules; some limited exceptions apply. Players may hold more than one non-FIFA nationality.

No.	Pos.	Nation	Player
—	MF	SWE	Linus Lenerius (at Gefle IF until 30 November 2025)

== Recent history ==
In recent seasons IFK Haninge/Brandbergens IF have competed in the following divisions:

2020 - Division 1 Norra
2019 - Division 2 Södra Svealand
2018 - Division 2 Södra Svealand
2017 - Division 2 Södra Svealand
2016 - Division 3 Södra Svealand
2015 - Division 3 Södra Svealand
2014 - Division 3 Södra Svealand
2013 - Division 3 Södra Svealand
2012 - Division 3 Södra Svealand
2011 - Division 3 Södra Svealand
2010 - Division 4 Stockholm Södra
2009 - Division 5 Stockholm Södra
2008 - Division 6 Stockholm E
2007 - Division 6 Stockholm D
2006 - Division 7 Stockholm G
2005 - Division 7 Stockholm G
2004 - Division 7 Stockholm G
2003 - Division 7 Stockholm F
2002 - Division 7 Stockholm G
2001 - Division 7 Stockholm F
2000 - Division 7 Stockholm G
1999 - Division 7 Stockholm F

== Attendances ==
In recent seasons Brandbergens IF have had the following average attendances:

Season	Average attendance	Division / Section	Level
2009	Not available	Div 5 Stockholm Södra	Tier 7
2010		Div 4 Stockholm Södra	Tier 6
2011	373	Div 3 Södra Svealand	Tier 5
2012	313	Div 3 Södra Svealand	Tier 5

* Attendances are provided in the Publikliga sections of the Svenska Fotbollförbundet website.
