= Varbergs BoIS =

Swedish football club

- Full name: Varbergs Boll- och Idrottssällskap
- Founded: 25 March 1925; 101 years ago
- Ground: Påskbergsvallen, Varberg
- Capacity: 4,500
- Chairman: Lars Karlsson
- Head coach: Victor Salwén
- League: Superettan
- 2025: 6th of 16
- Website: www.boisfc.nu
Home colours	Away colours

Varbergs BoIS FC is a Swedish professional football club located in Varberg, the main town of Varberg Municipality in Halland County.

== Background ==
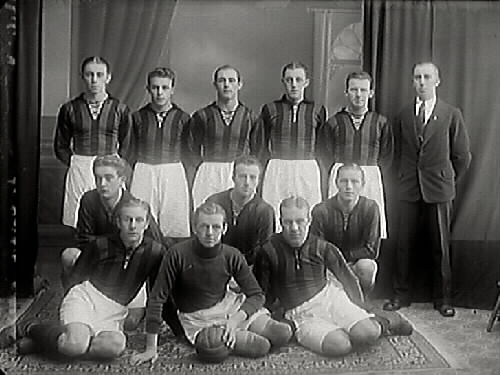
The Varbergs BoIS football team of 1932.

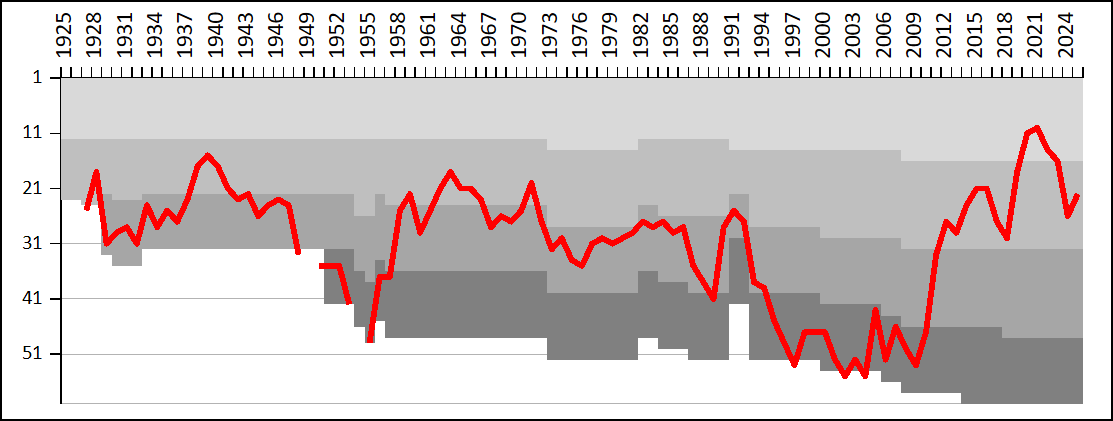
A chart showing the progress of Varbergs BoIS through the Swedish football league system. The different shades of gray represent league divisions.

The club was formed at a meeting in the Varbergs Folkets Hus on 25 March 1925. The backbone of the new club was a group of men from the Haga district of Varberg who had previously started a football club named Haga Bollklubb.

Over the years several sports have been covered by the club but activities are now centred on football and wrestling. The new organisations Varbergs BoIS FC (football) and Varbergs BoIS BK (wrestling) work side by side under the "umbrella" of Varbergs BoIS.

Since their foundation Varbergs BoIS FC has participated mainly in the middle divisions of the Swedish football league system. The club currently plays in Allsvenskan which is the top tier of Swedish football. They play their home matches at the Påskbergsvallen in Varberg and are well known for their distinctive green and black striped shirts.

Varbergs BoIS FC are affiliated to the Hallands Fotbollförbund. The club has an active youth section and girls football was introduced in 2008.

The club made their debut at the top level in the 2020 Allsvenskan.

== Players ==
=== First-team squad ===
As of 1 September 2026

Note: Flags indicate national team as defined under FIFA eligibility rules; some limited exceptions apply. Players may hold more than one non-FIFA nationality.

No.	Pos.	Nation	Player
1	GK	SWE	Oscar Ekman
2	DF	SWE	Gustav Broman
3	DF	SWE	Hampus Zackrisson
5	DF	SWE	Emil Hellman
7	MF	SWE	Wilhelm Ärlig
8	DF	SWE	Albin Winbo
9	FW	SWE	Laorent Shabani
10	MF	FIN	Axel Vidjeskog
11	FW	SWE	Nuurdin Ali Mohudin
12	MF	SWE	Lucas Kåhed
14	MF	SWE	Oliver Alfonsi
15	DF	SWE	Noah Johansson

No.	Pos.	Nation	Player
16	MF	SWE	Anton Thorsson
17	DF	SWE	Edvin Tellgren
18	DF	SWE	Joakim Lindner
19	FW	SWE	Jonathan Nilsson
20	FW	SWE	Olle Werner
21	MF	FIN	Isak Vidjeskog
22	DF	SWE	Niklas Dahlström
23	MF	SWE	Lucas Sibelius (on loan from Västerås SK)
24	MF	SWE	Oliver Brynéus
28	MF	KOS	Erion Sadiku
29	GK	SWE	Daniel Strindholm
49	FW	HAI	Shanyder Borgelin

=== Out on loan ===
Note: Flags indicate national team as defined under FIFA eligibility rules; some limited exceptions apply. Players may hold more than one non-FIFA nationality.

No.	Pos.	Nation	Player
40	DF	SWE	David Gustafsson (at Utsiktens BK until 30 November 2026)
41	MF	SWE	Nils Salomonsson Önnebo (at Laholms FK until 30 November 2026)

No.	Pos.	Nation	Player
42	MF	SWE	Viggo Gustavsson (at Tvååkers IF until 30 November 2026)
—	FW	KOS	Aulon Bitiqi (at IK Oddevold until 30 November 2026)

== Season to season ==
Season	Level	Division	Section	Position	Movements
1993	Tier 3	Division 2	Västra Götaland	10th	Relegation Playoffs
1994	Tier 3	Division 2	Västra Götaland	11th	Relegated
1995	Tier 4	Division 3	Sydvästra Götaland	5th	
1996	Tier 4	Division 3	Sydvästra Götaland	9th	Relegation Playoffs – Relegated
1997	Tier 5	Division 4	Halland	1st	Promoted
1998	Tier 4	Division 3	Sydvästra Götaland	7th	
1999	Tier 4	Division 3	Sydvästra Götaland	7th	
2000	Tier 4	Division 3	Sydvästra Götaland	5th	
2001	Tier 4	Division 3	Sydvästra Götaland	10th	Relegated
2002	Tier 5	Division 4	Halland	1st	Promoted
2003	Tier 4	Division 3	Sydvästra Götaland	10th	Relegated
2004	Tier 5	Division 4	Halland	1st	Promoted
2005	Tier 4	Division 3	Sydvästra Götaland	1st	Promoted
2006*	Tier 4	Division 2	Västra Götaland	8th	
2007	Tier 4	Division 2	Västra Götaland	2nd	
2008	Tier 4	Division 2	Västra Götaland	4th	
2009	Tier 4	Division 2	Västra Götaland	7th	
2010	Tier 4	Division 2	Södra Götaland	1st	Promoted
2011	Tier 3	Division 1	Södra	1st	Promoted
2012	Tier 2	Superettan		11th	
2013	Tier 2	Superettan		13th	Relegation Playoffs - Not Relegated
2014	Tier 2	Superettan		8th	
2015	Tier 2	Superettan		5th	
2016	Tier 2	Superettan		5th	
2017	Tier 2	Superettan		11th	
2018	Tier 2	Superettan		14th	Relegation Playoffs - Not Relegated
2019	Tier 2	Superettan		2nd	Promoted
2020	Tier 1	Allsvenskan		11th	
2021	Tier 1	Allsvenskan		10th	
2022	Tier 1	Allsvenskan		14th	Relegation Playoffs - Not Relegated
2023	Tier 1	Allsvenskan		16th	Relegated
2024	Tier 2	Superettan		10th	
2025	Tier 2	Superettan		6th	

* League restructuring in 2006 resulted in a new division being created at Tier 3 and subsequent divisions dropping a level.
