= 2019 AIK Fotboll season =

AIK
2019 season
- Chairman: Robert Falck
- Manager: Rikard Norling
- Stadium: Friends Arena
- Allsvenskan: 4th
- Svenska Cupen: Semi-finals
- Champions League: Second qualifying round
- Europa League: Play-off round
- Top goalscorer: League: Tarik Elyounoussi; Henok Goitom (11 each); All: Henok Goitom (15 goals)
- Highest home attendance: 45,367 (1 September 2019 vs Djurgården IF, Allsvenskan)
- Lowest home attendance: 7,875 (2 March 2019 vs Örgryte IS, Svenska Cupen)
- Average home league attendance: 18,970 (in Allsvenskan); 8,867 (in Svenska Cupen); 18,023 (in European cups); 17,420 (in all competitions)
Home colours	Away colours

The 2019 season was AIK's 128th in existence, their 91st season in Allsvenskan and their 14th consecutive season in the league. The team was competing in Allsvenskan, Svenska Cupen and UEFA Champions League.

== Squad ==
As of match played 2 November 2019

No.	Name	Nationality	Position	Date of birth (age)	Signed from	Signed in	Contract ends	Apps.	Goals
Goalkeepers
13	Kyriakos Stamatopoulos	(Canada)	GK	28 August 1979 (aged 40)	Tromsø	2011		63	0
23	Budimir Janošević	(Serbia)	GK	21 October 1989 (aged 30)	IF Brommapojkarna	2018	2020	15	0
34	Oscar Linnér	(Sweden)	GK	23 February 1997 (aged 22)	Academy	2015		115	0
Defenders
2	Daniel Granli	(Norway)	DF	1 May 1994 (aged 25)	Stabæk	2019	2022	24	0
3	Per Karlsson	(Sweden)	DF	2 January 1986 (aged 33)	Academy	2003			
5	Jesper Nyholm	(Sweden)	DF	10 September 1993 (aged 26)	Dalkurd	2017	2019	34	1
9	Rasmus Lindkvist	(Sweden)	DF	16 May 1990 (aged 29)	Vålerenga	2017	2020	80	8
12	Felix Michel	(Lebanon)	DF	23 July 1994 (aged 25)	AFC Eskilstuna	2019	2022	9	0
14	Karol Mets	(Estonia)	DF	16 May 1993 (aged 26)	NAC Breda	2019	2021	35	2
15	Robert Lundström	(Sweden)	DF	1 November 1989 (aged 30)	Vålerenga	2018	2020	29	3
Midfielders
6	Panajotis Dimitriadis	(Sweden)	MF	12 August 1986 (aged 33)	Giresunspor	2018	2020	65	2
7	Sebastian Larsson	(Sweden)	MF	6 June 1985 (aged 34)	Hull City	2018	2020	60	13
8	Enoch Adu	(Ghana)	MF	14 September 1990 (aged 29)	Akhisarspor	2018	2020	77	0
11	Nabil Bahoui	(Sweden)	MF	5 February 1991 (aged 28)	De Graafschap	2019	2022	103	39
16	Anton Salétros	(Sweden)	MF	12 April 1996 (aged 23)	on loan from Rostov	2019	2019	143	7
18	Bilal Hussein	(Sweden)	MF	22 April 2000 (aged 19)	Academy	2017		22	3
19	Saku Ylätupa	(Finland)	MF	4 August 1999 (aged 20)	AFC Ajax	2019	2022	11	0
20	Tarik Elyounoussi	(Norway)	MF	23 February 1988 (aged 31)	Olympiacos	2018	2019	74	26
24	Heradi Rashidi	(Sweden)	MF	24 July 1994 (aged 25)	Dalkurd	2018	2020	50	2
32	Tom Strannegård	(Sweden)	MF	29 April 2002 (aged 17)	Academy	2019		1	1
Forwards
10	Chinedu Obasi	(Nigeria)	FW	1 June 1986 (aged 33)	IF Elfsborg	2019	2019	47	20
17	Daniel Mushitu	(Sweden)	FW	22 February 2000 (aged 19)	Västerås	2017		5	0
30	Kolbeinn Sigþórsson	(Iceland)	FW	14 March 1990 (aged 29)	Nantes	2019	2021	25	4
36	Henok Goitom	(Eritrea)	FW	22 September 1984 (aged 35)	San Jose Earthquakes	2017	2018	228	86
Out on loan
11	Stefan Silva	(Sweden)	FW	11 March 1990 (aged 29)	Palermo	2018	2021	17	2
17	Adam Ben Lamin	(Tunisia)	DF	2 June 2001 (aged 18)	Academy	2019		0	0
22	Nicolás Stefanelli	(Argentina)	FW	22 November 1994 (aged 24)	Defensa y Justicia	2017	2020	44	17
31	Christos Gravius	(Sweden)	MF	14 October 1997 (aged 22)	Academy	2015		17	0
35	Samuel Brolin	(Sweden)	GK	1 May 1998 (aged 21)	Academy	2018		0	0
Left during the season
21	Daniel Sundgren	(Sweden)	DF	22 November 1990 (aged 28)	Degerfors	2016	2019	118	12
24	Robin Jansson	(Sweden)	DF	15 November 1991 (aged 27)	IK Oddevold	2018	2019	31	3
25	Magnar Ødegaard	(Norway)	DF	11 May 1993 (aged 26)	Tromsø	2019	2019	3	0
26	Joel Ekstrand	(Sweden)	DF	4 February 1989 (aged 30)	Rotherham United	2018	2020	6	0
28	Jack Lahne	(Sweden)	FW	24 October 2001 (aged 18)	on loan from Amiens	2019	2019	9	1

=== Players out on loan ===
Note: Flags indicate national team as defined under FIFA eligibility rules; some limited exceptions apply. Players may hold more than one non-FIFA nationality.

No.	Pos.	Nation	Player
11	FW	SWE	Stefan Silva (at Fatih Karagümrük until 31 December 2019)
17	DF	TUN	Adam Ben Lamin (at Utsikten until 31 December 2019)
22	FW	ARG	Nicolás Stefanelli (at Unión La Calera until 31 December 2019)

No.	Pos.	Nation	Player
31	MF	SWE	Christos Gravius (at Degerfors until 31 December 2019)
35	GK	SWE	Samuel Brolin (at Vasalund until 31 December 2019)

== Transfers ==
=== In ===
Date	Position	Nationality	Name	From	Fee	Ref.
22 January 2019	FW	(Nigeria)	Chinedu Obasi	IF Elfsborg	Undisclosed	
28 January 2019	DF	(Norway)	Daniel Granli	Stabaek	Undisclosed	
29 January 2019	MF	(Finland)	Saku Ylätupa	AFC Ajax	Undisclosed	
14 February 2019	DF	(Norway)	Magnar Ødegaard	Tromsø	Undisclosed	
14 March 2019	DF	(Estonia)	Karol Mets	NAC Breda	Undisclosed	
31 March 2019	FW	(Iceland)	Kolbeinn Sigþórsson	Nantes	Undisclosed	
25 July 2019	DF	(Lebanon)	Felix Michel	AFC Eskilstuna	Undisclosed	
25 July 2019	MF	(Sweden)	Nabil Bahoui	De Graafschap	Undisclosed	

=== Loans in ===
Start date	Position	Nationality	Name	From	End date	Ref.
6 February 2019	MF	(Sweden)	Anton Salétros	Rostov	31 December 2019	
5 April 2019	FW	(Sweden)	Jack Lahne	Amiens	30 June 2019	

=== Out ===
Date	Position	Nationality	Name	To	Fee	Ref.
1 January 2019	FW	(Sweden)	Albin Linnér	IF Brommapojkarna	Undisclosed	
7 January 2019	MF	(Sweden)	Kristoffer Olsson	Krasnodar	Undisclosed	
12 March 2019	DF	(Sweden)	Robin Jansson	Orlando City	Undisclosed	
11 July 2019	DF	(Sweden)	Daniel Sundgren	Aris Thessaloniki	Undisclosed	

=== Loans out ===
Start date	Position	Nationality	Name	To	End date	Ref.
16 January 2019	FW	(Sweden)	Daniel Mushitu	Vasalunds IF	31 December 2019	
18 January 2019	FW	(Argentina)	Nicolás Stefanelli	Anorthosis Famagusta	30 June 2019	
12 February 2019	MF	(Sweden)	Christos Gravius	Degerfors IF	31 December 2019	
27 February 2019	GK	(Sweden)	Samuel Brolin	Vasalunds IF	31 December 2019	
25 July 2019	FW	(Sweden)	Stefan Silva	Fatih Karagümrük	31 December 2019	
29 July 2019	FW	(Argentina)	Nicolás Stefanelli	Unión La Calera	31 December 2019	
16 August 2019	DF	(Tunisia)	Adam Ben Lamin	Utsiktens BK	31 December 2019	

=== Released ===
Date	Position	Nationality	Name	Joined	Date	Ref
30 June 2019	DF	(Norway)	Magnar Ødegaard	Sarpsborg 08	18 July 2019	
9 October 2019	DF	(Sweden)	Joel Ekstrand	Retired		
31 December 2019	DF	(Sweden)	Jesper Nyholm	Djurgården		
31 December 2019	MF	(Norway)	Tarik Elyounoussi	Shonan Bellmare	12 January 2020	
31 December 2019	FW	(Nigeria)	Chinedu Obasi	Rheindorf Altach		

== Friendlies ==
19 January 2019	Vasalund	0–1	AIK	Stockholm
14:00 CET (UTC+1)		Report	Hussein 83'	Stadium: Skytteholms IP; Attendance: 1,100; Referee: Fredrik Hansson

25 January 2019	AIK	1–1	GIF Sundsvall	Stockholm
14:30 CET (UTC+1)	Sundgren 26' (pen.)	Report	Hallenius 11'	Stadium: Skytteholms IP; Referee: Glenn Nyberg
Note: Match originally scheduled for 26 January, but moved forward due to anticipated bad weather.

8 February 2019	New York City FC	1–1	AIK	Abu Dhabi, United Arab Emirates
14:00 CET (UTC+1)	Mitriță 50'	Report	Larsson (yellow card); Sundgren 53' (pen.)	Stadium: New York University

24 March 2019	AIK	2–2	IF Brommapojkarna	Stockholm
13:00 CET (UTC+1)	Obasi 14'; Silva 39'	Report	Pehrsson 10'; Linnér 90+4'	Stadium: Friends Arena; Attendance: 1,626; Referee: Johan Krantz

19 June 2019	AIK	1–1	BK Häcken	Bengtsfors
17:00 CET (UTC+1)	Hussein 16'	Report	Irandust 54'	Stadium: Långevi IP; Attendance: 2,000

== Competitions ==
=== Overview ===
Competition	First match	Last match	Starting round	Final position	Record							
Competition	First match	Last match	Starting round	Final position	Pld	W	D	L	GF	GA	GD	Win %
Allsvenskan	31 March 2019	2 November 2019	Matchday 1	4th	30	19	5	6	47	24	+23	63.33
2018–19 Svenska Cupen	16 February 2019	17 March 2019	From 2018 season	Semifinal	5	3	2	0	8	4	+4	60.00
2019–20 Svenska Cupen	9 November 2019	Progress to 2020 season	Second Round	Progress to 2020 season	1	1	0	0	7	0	+7	100.00
UEFA Champions League	9 July 2019	31 July 2019	First qualifying round	Second qualifying round	4	2	0	2	8	7	+1	50.00
UEFA Europa League	8 August 2019	29 August 2019	Third qualifying round	Playoff round	4	1	1	2	4	8	−4	25.00
Total					44	26	8	10	74	43	+31	59.09

Last updated: 2 November 2019
Source: Competitions

=== Allsvenskan ===
==== League table ====
Pos	Team	Pld	W	D	L	GF	GA	GD	Pts	Qualification or relegation
2	Malmö FF	30	19	8	3	56	16	+40	65	Qualification for the Europa League first qualifying round
3	Hammarby IF	30	20	5	5	75	38	+37	65	Qualification for the Europa League first qualifying round
4	AIK	30	19	5	6	47	24	+23	62	
5	IFK Norrköping	30	16	9	5	54	26	+28	57	
6	BK Häcken	30	14	7	9	44	29	+15	49	

Source: svenskfotboll.se (in Swedish)
Rules for classification: 1) Points; 2) Goal difference; 3) Goals scored; 4) Head-to-head points; 5) Head-to-head goal difference; 6) Head-to-head away goals scored; 7) Play-off
(Note: Play-off is only played if need to decide champion, teams for relegation or UEFA competition and will be played on a neutral ground).

==== Results summary ====
Overall								Home						Away					
Pld	W	D	L	GF	GA	GD	Pts	W	D	L	GF	GA	GD	W	D	L	GF	GA	GD
30	19	5	6	47	24	+23	62	11	2	2	21	7	+14	8	3	4	26	17	+9

Last updated: 2 November 2019.
Source: (in Swedish)

==== Results by round ====
Round	1	2	3	4	5	6	7	8	9	10	11	12	13	14	15	16	17	18	19	20	21	22	23	24	25	26	27	28	29	30
Ground	H	A	H	A	H	A	H	A	A	H	A	H	H (Note: matchday 18)	H (Note: matchday 13)	A (Note: matchday 14)	H (Note: matchday 15)	H (Note: matchday 16)	A (Note: matchday 17)	A	H	A	H	A	A	H	A	H	A	A	H
Result	D	D	W	L	W	L	W	W	W	W	D	W	L	D	W	W	W	W	W	L	W	W	W	L	W	D	W	W	L	W
Position	11	11	5	8	4	9	8	5	5	3	4	3	3	3	2	1	1	3	2	3	2	2	2	3	3	4	4	4	4	4

Updated to match(es) played on 2 November 2019. Source: see Results
A = Away; H = Home; W = Win; D = Draw; L = Loss

==== Results ====
31 March 2019 1	AIK	0–0	Östersund	Stockholm
15:00	Adu (yellow card) 90+5'	Report	Amin (yellow card) 3'; Isherwood (yellow card) 39'	Stadium: Friends Arena; Attendance: 29,157; Referee: Patrik Eriksson

8 April 2019 2	IFK Norrköping	0–0	AIK	Norrköping
19:00		Report	Mets (yellow card) 21'; Larsson (yellow card) 31'; Obasi (yellow card) 61'	Stadium: Östgötaporten; Attendance: 14,162; Referee: Andreas Ekberg

14 April 2019 3	AIK	2–1	IK Sirius	Stockholm
15:00	Obasi 62'; Lahne 75' (yellow card) 77'; Silva (yellow card) 85'; Larsson (yellow card) 90+5'	Report	Persson (yellow card) 4'; Ceesay (yellow card) 38'; Haglund 45+1'; Björkström (yellow card) 90+5'	Stadium: Friends Arena; Attendance: 16,019; Referee: Mohammed Al-Hakim

19 April 2019 4	Örebro SK	2–1	AIK	Örebro
16:00	Rogić 56', 90+2' (yellow card) 90+3'; Björkman (yellow card) 74'	Report	Lahne (yellow card) 48'; Elyounoussi 58'	Stadium: Behrn Arena; Attendance: 11,221; Referee: Kristoffer Karlsson

24 April 2019 5	AIK	1–0	BK Häcken	Stockholm
19:00	Larsson (yellow card) 45+1'; Sundgren 76' (yellow card) 40'; Linnér (yellow card) 90+3'	Report	Lindgren (yellow card) 47'; Ekpolo (yellow card) 82'	Stadium: Friends Arena; Attendance: 11,131; Referee: Glenn Nyberg

29 April 2019 6	IFK Göteborg	3–0	AIK	Gothenburg
19:00	Kharaishvili 45+1'; Lagemyr 65' (yellow card) 58'; Abraham 81'; Erlingmark (yellow card) 83'	Report	Sundgren (yellow card) 44'; Adu (yellow card) 45+1'; Mets (yellow card) 59'; Salétros (yellow card) 77'	Stadium: Ullevi; Attendance: 15,311; Referee: Kristoffer Karlsson

4 May 2019 7	AIK	2–1	AFC Eskilstuna	Stockholm
13:30	Sundgren 31' (pen.); Elyounoussi 50'; Ylätupa (yellow card) 90+2'	Report	Bobko (yellow card) 26'; Söderberg (red card) 45'; Nnamani 55'	Stadium: Friends Arena; Attendance: 12,314; Referee: Magnus Lindgren

12 May 2019 8	Djurgården	0–2	AIK	Stockholm
15:00		Report	Lahne (yellow card) 25'; Elyounoussi 51', 63'; Salétros (yellow card) 86'; Larsson (yellow card) 87'	Stadium: Tele2 Arena; Attendance: 21,167; Referee: Bojan Pandžić

15 May 2019 9	Helsingborg	1–3	AIK	Helsingborg
19:00	Svensson 17' (yellow card) 64'; Joelsson (yellow card) 42'; Wánderson (yellow card) 90'	Report	Elyounoussi 16', 69'; Sundgren 43' (pen.)	Stadium: Olympia; Attendance: 8,538; Referee: Stefan Johannesson

20 May 2019 10	AIK	2–0	Falkenberg	Stockholm
19:00	Dimitriadis (yellow card) 45'; Elyounoussi 48', 57'	Report	Björkengren (yellow card) 36'	Stadium: Friends Arena; Attendance: 14,822; Referee: Mohammed Al-Hakim

24 May 2019 11	GIF Sundsvall	1–1	AIK	Sundsvall
19:00	Batanero 42'	Report	Elyounoussi 26'	Stadium: Idrottsparken; Attendance: 4,560; Referee: Patrik Eriksson

2 June 2019 12	AIK	2–0	Hammarby	Stockholm
15:00	Larsson 17', 19'	Report	Sandberg (yellow card) 30'; Widgren (yellow card) 40'	Stadium: Friends Arena; Attendance: 32,861; Referee: Glenn Nyberg

25 June 2019 18	AIK	0–2	IFK Norrköping	Stockholm
19:00	Dimitriadis (red card) 55'; Salétros (yellow card) 61'; Lahne (yellow card) 81'	Report	Þórarinsson (yellow card) 24'; Nyman 44', 63'; Gerson (yellow card) 70'	Stadium: Friends Arena; Attendance: 18,091; Referee: Bojan Pandžić

30 June 2019 13	AIK	0–0	Malmö FF	Stockholm
15:00	Elyounoussi (yellow card) 42'; Larsson (yellow card) 82'	Report	Traustason (yellow card) 39'; Innocent (yellow card) 68'; Brorsson (yellow card) 87'	Stadium: Friends Arena; Attendance: 19,141; Referee: Stefan Johannesson

6 July 2019 14	Kalmar FF	0–1	AIK	Kalmar
16:00	Romário (yellow card) 45+13' (yellow-red card) 79'; Rafinha (yellow card) 63'; Diouf (yellow card) 76'; V.Elm (yellow card) 86'	Report	Sigþórsson (yellow card) 40'; Mets (yellow card) 45+14'; Obasi 56'	Stadium: Guldfågeln Arena; Attendance: 7,139; Referee: Kristoffer Karlsson

13 July 2019 15	AIK	3–0	IF Elfsborg	Stockholm
16:00	Sigþórsson 24', 39'; Goitom 65'	Report	Frick (yellow card) 9'; Ndione (yellow card) 86'	Stadium: Friends Arena; Attendance: 12,076; Referee: Victor Wolf

20 July 2019 16	AIK	2–0	Helsingborg	Stockholm
16:00	Salétros 30'; Obasi 80'	Report	Granqvist (yellow card) 8'; Randrup (yellow card) 34'	Stadium: Friends Arena; Attendance: 14,314; Referee: Mohammed Al-Hakim

27 July 2019 17	IK Sirius	0–2	AIK	Uppsala
16:00	Andersson (yellow card) 80'; Saeid (yellow card) 90+5'	Report	Obasi 54'; Goitom 65'	Stadium: Studenternas IP; Attendance: 6,132; Referee: Patrik Eriksson

11 August 2019 19	AFC Eskilstuna	2–4	AIK	Eskilstuna
15:00	Hodžić 8'; Camara 90+5'	Report	Salétros (yellow card) 12'; Goitom 29'; Sigþórsson (yellow card) 49'; Larsson 65' (pen.); Bahoui 78', 81'	Stadium: Tunavallen; Attendance: 6,037; Referee: Bojan Pandžić

17 August 2019 20	AIK	1–2	Kalmar FF	Stockholm
16:00	Larsson (yellow card) 40'; Elyounoussi 51'	Report	Jakobsen 10'; Aliti 45' (yellow card) 45+1'; Herrem (yellow card) 53'; Manns (yellow card) 59'; Rafael (yellow card) 71'	Stadium: Friends Arena; Attendance: 14,406; Referee: Stefan Johannesson

24 August 2019 21	Östersund	1–3	AIK	Östersund
13:30	Sonko Sundberg (yellow card) 39'; Haugan (yellow card) 49' (yellow-red card) 76'; Turgott 60'; Pettersson (yellow card) 70'	Report	Salétros 47'; Granli (yellow card) 53'; Obasi (yellow card) 70'; Lindkvist 89'; Rashidi 90+2'	Stadium: Jämtkraft Arena; Attendance: 5,107; Referee: Kaspar Sjöberg

1 September 2019 22	AIK	1–0	Djurgården	Stockholm
15:00	Larsson 23' (pen.); Elyounoussi (yellow card) 50'; Adu (yellow card) 78' (yellow-red card) 90+1'; Bahoui (yellow card) 90+6'	Report	Danielson (yellow card) 21'; Kujović (yellow card) 90+1'	Stadium: Friends Arena; Attendance: 45,367; Referee: Andreas Ekberg

15 September 2019 23	BK Häcken	1–2	AIK	Gothenburg
15:00	Lindgren (yellow card) 47'; Paulinho 56' (yellow card) 66'; Friberg (yellow card) 70'	Report	Obasi 26'; Elyounoussi (yellow card) 40'; Mets (yellow card) 84'; Lindkvist (yellow card) 90+3'	Stadium: Bravida Arena; Attendance: 5,208; Referee: Glenn Nyberg

22 September 2019 24	Hammarby	2–1	AIK	Stockholm
15:00	Rodić 30', 56' (yellow card) 31'; Kačaniklić (yellow card) 72'	Report	Sigþórsson (yellow card) 35'; Mets 68' (yellow card) 71'; Linnér (yellow card) 72'	Stadium: Tele2 Arena; Attendance: 27,329; Referee: Kristoffer Karlsson

25 September 2019 25	AIK	1–0	IFK Göteborg	Stockholm
19:00	Larsson 20' (pen.) (yellow card) 34'; Goitom (yellow card) 22'; Elyounoussi (yellow card) 90+2'; Mets (yellow card) 90+3'	Report	Calisir (yellow card) 19' (red card) 69'	Stadium: Friends Arena; Attendance: 18,068; Referee: Andreas Ekberg

29 September 2019 26	IF Elfsborg	1–1	AIK	Borås
15:00	Heltne Nilsen (yellow card) 57'; Okumu (yellow card) 70'; Karlsson (yellow card) 76'; Levi 83'; Lundevall (yellow card) 90+1'	Report	Goitom 75'; Salétros (yellow card) 90'	Stadium: Borås Arena; Attendance: 6,042; Referee: Mohammed Al-Hakim

6 October 2019 27	AIK	2–0	Örebro SK	Stockholm
16:00	Goitom 54', 90+6'; Salétros (yellow card) 64'	Report	Bertilsson (yellow card) 90+4'	Stadium: Friends Arena; Attendance: 12,427; Referee: Glenn Nyberg

20 October 2019 28	Falkenberg	1–5	AIK	Falkenberg
15:00	Nilsson (red card) 9'; Mathisen (yellow card) 36'; Peter 84'	Report	Goitom 13', 33', 79', 80'; Elyounoussi 70'	Stadium: Falcon Alkoholfri Arena; Attendance: 3,606; Referee: Martin Strömbergsson

27 October 2019 29	Malmö FF	2–0	AIK	Malmö
19:00	Larsson (yellow card) 6'; Bengtsson (yellow card) 21'; Rieks (yellow card) 75'; Christiansen 78'; Traustason 87'	Report	Elyounoussi (yellow card) 30'; Mets (yellow card) 79'; Karlsson (yellow card) 90+1'	Stadium: Stadion; Attendance: 21,379; Referee: Bojan Pandžić

2 November 2019 30	AIK	2–1	GIF Sundsvall	Stockholm
13:00	Larsson (yellow card) 66'; Sigþórsson 69'; Goitom 90+2'	Report	Gracia (yellow card) 12'; Blomberg 76' (yellow card) 64'	Stadium: Friends Arena; Attendance: 14,355; Referee: Kaspar Sjöberg

=== Svenska Cupen ===
==== 2018–19 ====
===== Group stage =====
Pos	Team	Pld	W	D	L	GF	GA	GD	Pts	Qualification
1	AIK	3	2	1	0	3	1	+2	7	Advance to Knockout stage
2	Jönköpings Södra IF	3	2	0	1	3	2	+1	6	
3	Örgryte IS	3	1	0	2	3	3	0	3	
4	Norrby IF	3	0	1	2	1	4	−3	1	

Updated to match(es) played on 2 March 2019. Source: Swedish Football Association
Rules for classification: 1) Points; 2) Goal difference; 3) Goals scored; 4) Head-to-head record; 5) Highest ranked team

16 February 2019 1	AIK	1–0	Jönköpings Södra	Stockholm
14:00 CET (UTC+1)	Sundgren 14' (pen.)	Report	Pettersson (yellow card) 14'	Stadium: Friends Arena; Attendance: 9,995; Referee: Victor Wolf

24 February 2018 2	Norrby	1–1	AIK	Borås
17:00 CET (UTC+1)	Andersson (yellow card) 20'; Yarsuvat 25'; Krasnici (yellow card) 58'; Savolainen (yellow card) 89'	Report	Elyounoussi 43' (yellow card) 64'	Stadium: Borås Arena; Attendance: 974; Referee: Granit Maqedonci

2 March 2019 3	AIK	1–0	Örgryte	Stockholm
14:00 CET (UTC+1)	Elyounoussi (yellow card) 74'; Goitom 85'	Report	Ludwigson (yellow card) 34'; Almström-Tähti (yellow card) 49'	Stadium: Friends Arena; Attendance: 7,875; Referee: Kristoffer Karlsson

===== Knock-out stage =====
9 March 2019 Quarterfinal	Öster	2–4 (a.e.t.)	AIK	Växjö
16:00 CET (UTC+1)	Lundgren (yellow card) 6'; S.Karlsson (yellow card) 39'; Kapčević 42', 64' (pen.)	Report	Larsson 7'; Sundgren 85' (pen.); Obasi 98', 109'	Stadium: Myresjöhus Arena; Attendance: 2,835; Referee: Kaspar Sjöberg

17 March 2019 Semifinal	AIK	1–1 (a.e.t.) (5–6 p)	AFC Eskilstuna	Stockholm
18:15 CET (UTC+1)	Dimitriadis 55'; Sundgren (yellow card) 69'; Elyounoussi (yellow card) 112'	Report	Larsson 82' (o.g.); León Bernal (yellow card) 83'; Raskaj (yellow card) 108'	Stadium: Friends Arena; Attendance: 8,731; Referee: Stefan Johannesson
	Penalties
	Larsson (penalty scored); Elyounoussi (penalty scored); Goitom (penalty missed); Obasi (penalty missed); Ylätupa (penalty scored); Adu (penalty scored); Linnér (penalty scored); Rashidi (penalty missed)		(penalty scored) Hodžić; (penalty missed) Loeper; (penalty scored) Avdić; (penalty scored) León Bernal; (penalty missed) Kojic; (penalty scored) Camara; (penalty scored) Jarl; (penalty scored) Michel

==== 2019–20 ====
9 November 2019 Second Round	Enskede	0–7	AIK	Stockholm
14:00 CEST (UTC+2)	Stigenberg (yellow card) 70' (yellow-red card) 83'; Lager (yellow card) 77'	Report	Larsson 23'; Elyounoussi 30', 39', 60'; Stigenberg 45+1' (o.g.); Hussein 84' (pen.); Strannegård 89'	Stadium: Friends Arena; Attendance: 4,039; Referee: Richard Sundell

=== UEFA Champions League ===
==== Qualifying rounds ====
9 July 2019 First qualifying round 1st leg	Ararat-Armenia	2–1	(Sweden) AIK	Yerevan, Armenia
16:00 CEST (UTC+2)	Avetisyan 3' (pen.), 45'; Malakyan (yellow card) 28'; Antonov (yellow card) 89'	Report	Lundström (yellow card) 2' (yellow-red card) 13'; Obasi 39'	Stadium: Yerevan Football Academy Stadium; Attendance: 1,497; Referee: Duje Strukan (Croatia)

17 July 2019 First qualifying round 2nd leg	AIK (Sweden)	3–1 (4–3 agg.)	Ararat-Armenia	Stockholm, Sweden
19:00 CEST (UTC+2)	Goitom 46', 52'; Larsson 62' (pen.); Adu (yellow card) 66'	Report	Kobyalko 77'	Stadium: Friends Arena; Attendance: 11,382; Referee: Robert Hennessy (Republic of Ireland)

24 July 2019 Second qualifying round 1st leg	NK Maribor (Slovenia)	2–1	(Sweden) AIK	Maribor, Slovenia
20:15 CEST (UTC+2)	Kronaveter 6'; Crețu (yellow card) 13'; Ivković 38'	Report	Goitom 28'	Stadium: Stadion Ljudski vrt Attendance: 7,816; Referee: Sascha Stegemann (Germany)

31 July 2019 Second qualifying round 2nd leg	AIK (Sweden)	3–2 (a.e.t.) (4–4 (a) agg.)	(Slovenia) NK Maribor	Stockholm, Sweden
19:00 CEST (UTC+2)	Karlsson 4'; Elyounoussi (yellow card) 10' (goal) 93'; Salétros (yellow card) 24'; Larsson (yellow card) 41' (goal) 61'		Kotnik 48'; Peričić (yellow card) 60'; Vrhovec (yellow card) 75'; Crețu (yellow card) 53' (goal) 117'; Pirić (yellow card) 120+1'	Stadium: Tele2 Arena; Attendance: 19,179; Referee: Adrien Jaccottet (Switzerland)

=== UEFA Europa League ===
==== Qualifying rounds ====
8 August 2019 Third qualifying round 1st leg	Sheriff Tiraspol (Moldova)	1–2	(Sweden) AIK	Tiraspol, Moldova
19:00 CEST (UTC+2)	Kendysh 56' (pen.); Tambe (yellow card) 75'; Lukić (yellow card) 84'	Report	Lukić 12' (o.g.); Sigþórsson 14'; Dimitriadis (yellow card) 55'; Elyounoussi (yellow card) 57'	Stadium: Sheriff Stadium; Attendance: 6,341; Referee: Kevin Clancy (Scotland)

15 August 2019 Third qualifying round 2nd leg	AIK (Sweden)	1–1 (3–2 agg.)	(Moldova) Sheriff Tiraspol	Stockholm, Sweden
19:00 CEST (UTC+2)	Elyounoussi (yellow card) 50'; Bahoui 61'	Report	Mužek (yellow card) 27'; Kendysh (yellow card) 39'; Lukić (yellow card) 44'; Boban 87'	Stadium: Friends Arena; Attendance: 13,122; Referee: Roi Reinshreiber (Israel)

22 August 2019 Playoff round 1st leg	Celtic (Scotland)	2–0	(Sweden) AIK	Glasgow, Scotland
19:45 CEST (UTC+2)	Bolingoli-Mbombo (yellow card) 44'; Forrest 48'; Édouard 73'	Report	Larsson (yellow card) 38'; Lundström (yellow card) 74'	Stadium: Celtic Park; Attendance: 40,885; Referee: Tamás Bognár (Hungary)

29 August 2019 Playoff round 2nd leg	AIK (Sweden)	1–4 (1–6 agg.)	(Scotland) Celtic	Stockholm, Sweden
19:00 CEST (UTC+2)	Bahoui (yellow card) 8'; Larsson 33' (pen.); Adu (yellow card) 51'; Mets (yellow card) 53'	Report	Forrest 17'; Bitton (yellow card) 30'; Linnér 34' (o.g.); Brown (yellow card) 51'; Édouard (yellow card) 71'; Jullien 87'; Morgan 90+3'	Stadium: Tele2 Arena; Attendance: 28,410; Referee: Nikola Dabanović (Montenegro)

== Squad statistics ==
As of match played 2 November 2019

=== Appearances and goals ===
No.	Pos	Nat	Player	Total		Allsvenskan		2018–19 Svenska Cupen		2019–20 Svenska Cupen		UEFA Champions League		UEFA Europa League	
No.	Pos	Nat	Player	Apps	Goals	Apps	Goals	Apps	Goals	Apps	Goals	Apps	Goals	Apps	Goals
2	DF	(Norway) NOR	Daniel Granli	24	0	9+2	0	5	0	1	0	4	0	3	0
3	DF	(Sweden) SWE	Per Karlsson	40	1	28	0	5	0	0	0	3	1	4	0
6	MF	(Sweden) SWE	Panajotis Dimitriadis	34	1	23+2	0	1+2	1	1	0	1+2	0	1+1	0
7	MF	(Sweden) SWE	Sebastian Larsson	42	11	25+3	6	5	1	1	1	3+1	2	4	1
8	MF	(Ghana) GHA	Enoch Adu	41	0	27	0	5	0	1	0	4	0	4	0
9	DF	(Sweden) SWE	Rasmus Lindkvist	28	1	15+3	1	4+1	0	0	0	0+3	0	2	0
10	FW	(Nigeria) NGR	Chinedu Obasi	27	8	15+3	5	1+2	2	0	0	3+1	1	1+1	0
11	MF	(Sweden) SWE	Nabil Bahoui	13	3	2+6	2	0	0	0+1	0	0	0	2+2	1
12	DF	(Lebanon) LBN	Felix Michel	9	0	3+5	0	0	0	0	0	0	0	0+1	0
14	DF	(Estonia) EST	Karol Mets	35	2	25+1	2	0	0	1	0	4	0	4	0
15	DF	(Sweden) SWE	Robert Lundström	19	2	8+5	2	0	0	0	0	2	0	4	0
16	MF	(Sweden) SWE	Anton Salétros	39	2	18+8	2	4	0	1	0	4	0	3+1	0
18	MF	(Sweden) SWE	Bilal Hussein	22	3	10+6	2	0+2	0	1	1	1+1	0	0+1	0
19	MF	(Finland) FIN	Saku Ylätupa	11	0	2+4	0	2+2	0	0+1	0	0	0	0	0
20	MF	(Norway) NOR	Tarik Elyounoussi	40	15	24+4	11	4+1	0	1	3	4	1	2	0
23	GK	(Serbia) SRB	Budimir Janošević	5	0	3	0	1	0	1	0	0	0	0	0
24	MF	(Sweden) SWE	Heradi Rashidi	31	1	10+10	1	2+2	0	1	0	2+1	0	0+3	0
30	FW	(Iceland) ISL	Kolbeinn Sigþórsson	25	4	12+5	3	0	0	1	0	1+3	0	3	1
32	MF	(Sweden) SWE	Tom Strannegård	1	1	0	0	0	0	0+1	1	0	0	0	0
34	GK	(Sweden) SWE	Oscar Linnér	39	0	27	0	4	0	0	0	4	0	4	0
36	FW	(Eritrea) ERI	Henok Goitom	43	15	23+7	11	4+1	1	0	0	4	3	3+1	0
Players away on loan:
11	FW	(Sweden) SWE	Stefan Silva	4	0	1+3	0	0	0	0	0	0	0	0	0
Players who appeared for AIK but left during the season:
21	DF	(Sweden) SWE	Daniel Sundgren	20	5	15	3	4+1	2	0	0	0	0	0	0
24	DF	(Sweden) SWE	Robin Jansson	2	0	0	0	2	0	0	0	0	0	0	0
25	DF	(Norway) NOR	Magnar Ødegaard	3	0	0	0	2+1	0	0	0	0	0	0	0
28	FW	(Sweden) SWE	Jack Lahne	9	1	5+4	1	0	0	0	0	0	0	0	0

=== Goal scorers ===
Place	Position	Nation	Number	Name	Allsvenskan	2018–19 Svenska Cupen	2019–20 Svenska Cupen	UEFA Champions League	UEFA Europa League	Total
1	MF	(Norway)	20	Tarik Elyounoussi	11	1	3	1	0	16
2	FW	(Eritrea)	36	Henok Goitom	11	1	0	3	0	15
3	MF	(Sweden)	16	Sebastian Larsson	6	1	1	2	1	11
4	FW	(Nigeria)	10	Chinedu Obasi	5	2	0	1	0	8
5	DF	(Sweden)	21	Daniel Sundgren	3	2	0	0	0	5
6	FW	(Iceland)	30	Kolbeinn Sigþórsson	3	0	0	0	1	4
7	MF	(Sweden)	11	Nabil Bahoui	2	0	0	0	1	3
8	MF	(Sweden)	16	Anton Salétros	2	0	0	0	0	2
9	DF	(Sweden)	9	Rasmus Lindkvist	1	0	0	0	0	1
9	DF	(Estonia)	14	Karol Mets	1	0	0	0	0	1
9	MF	(Sweden)	24	Heradi Rashidi	1	0	0	0	0	1
9	FW	(Sweden)	28	Jack Lahne	1	0	0	0	0	1
9	MF	(Sweden)	6	Panajotis Dimitriadis	0	1	0	0	0	1
9	MF	(Sweden)	18	Bilal Hussein	0	0	1	0	0	1
9	MF	(Sweden)	32	Tom Strannegård	0	0	1	0	0	1
9	DF	(Sweden)	3	Per Karlsson	0	0	0	1	0	1
9				Own goal	0	0	1	0	0	1
TOTALS					47	8	7	8	3	73

=== Clean sheets ===
Place	Position	Nation	Number	Name	Allsvenskan	2018–19 Svenska Cupen	2019–20 Svenska Cupen	UEFA Champions League	UEFA Europa League	Total
1	GK	(Sweden)	34	Oscar Linnér	14	2	0	0	0	16
2	GK	(Serbia)	23	Budimir Janošević	0	0	1	0	0	1
TOTALS					14	2	1	0	0	17

=== Disciplinary record ===
Number	Nation	Position	Name	Allsvenskan		2018–19 Svenska Cupen		2019–20 Svenska Cupen		UEFA Champions League		UEFA Europa League		Total	
Number	Nation	Position	Name	Yellow card	Red card	Yellow card	Red card	Yellow card	Red card	Yellow card	Red card	Yellow card	Red card	Yellow card	Red card
2	(Norway)	DF	Daniel Granli	1	0	0	0	0	0	0	0	0	0	1	0
3	(Sweden)	DF	Per Karlsson	1	0	0	0	0	0	0	0	0	0	1	0
6	(Sweden)	MF	Panajotis Dimitriadis	1	1	0	0	0	0	0	0	1	0	2	1
7	(Sweden)	MF	Sebastian Larsson	8	0	0	0	0	0	1	0	1	0	10	0
8	(Ghana)	MF	Enoch Adu	4	1	0	0	0	0	1	0	1	0	6	1
9	(Sweden)	DF	Rasmus Lindkvist	1	0	0	0	0	0	0	0	0	0	1	0
10	(Nigeria)	FW	Chinedu Obasi	2	0	0	0	0	0	0	0	0	0	2	0
11	(Sweden)	MF	Nabil Bahoui	1	0	0	0	0	0	0	0	1	0	2	0
14	(Estonia)	DF	Karol Mets	7	0	0	0	0	0	0	0	1	0	8	0
15	(Norway)	DF	Robert Lundström	0	0	0	0	0	0	2	1	1	0	3	1
16	(Sweden)	MF	Anton Salétros	6	0	0	0	0	0	1	0	0	0	7	0
19	(Finland)	MF	Saku Ylätupa	1	0	0	0	0	0	0	0	0	0	1	0
20	(Norway)	MF	Tarik Elyounoussi	5	0	3	0	0	0	1	0	2	0	11	0
30	(Iceland)	FW	Kolbeinn Sigþórsson	3	0	0	0	0	0	0	0	1	0	4	0
34	(Sweden)	GK	Oscar Linnér	2	0	0	0	0	0	0	0	0	0	2	0
36	(Eritrea)	FW	Henok Goitom	1	0	0	0	0	0	0	0	0	0	1	0
Players away on loan:
11	(Sweden)	FW	Stefan Silva	1	0	0	0	0	0	0	0	0	0	1	0
Players who left AIK during the season:
21	(Sweden)	DF	Daniel Sundgren	2	0	1	0	0	0	0	0	0	0	3	0
28	(Sweden)	FW	Jack Lahne	4	0	0	0	0	0	0	0	0	0	4	0
Total				51	2	4	0	0	0	6	1	9	0	70	3
