= Engedal =

Engedal is a surname. Notable people with the surname include:

- Knud Engedal (born 1942), Danish footballer
- Lars Martin Engedal (born 1983), Norwegian footballer
- Svend Engedal (1928–2001), Danish-born American soccer player
