= Lennart Söderberg =

Swedish football player and manager (1941–2022)

Personal information
- Full name: Kurt Lennart Söderberg
- Date of birth: 7 July 1941
- Place of birth: Torpshammar, Sweden
- Date of death: 13 October 2022 (aged 81)
- Position: Defender

Youth career
- 1948–1950: Råsunda IS
- 1950–1959: AIK

Senior career*
Years	Team	Apps	(Gls)
1959–1961	AIK	7	(1)
1961	GIF Sundsvall		
1962–1968	AIK	78	(0)
1968–1970	Ljusdals IF		
1970	AIK	0	(0)
1972	Ulriksdals SK		

International career
1959	Sweden U19	1	(0)
1961–1964	Sweden U21	5	(0)
1965	Sweden B	3	(0)
1965	Sweden	1	(0)

Managerial career
- 1967–1969: Ljusdals IF
- 1971–1972: Ulriksdals SK
- 1973–1975: Gefle IF
- 1975–1980: Västerås SK
- 1981–1982: IFK Eskilstuna
- 1983–1984: Odds BK
- 1984: Västerås SK
- 1985–1986: Vasalunds IF
- 1987–1989: Gefle IF
- 1990–1991: Ikast FS
- 1993: Anorthosis Famagusta
- 1993–1994: Syrianska FC
- 1994–1997: Västerås SK
- 1997: IFK Malmö
- 1998: IFK Eskilstuna
- 2001: Köpings FF
- 2004: Västerås SK
- * Club domestic league appearances and goals

Kurt Lennart Söderberg (7 July 1941 – 13 October 2022) was a Swedish football player and manager. He won one cap for the Sweden national team in 1965

== Playing career ==
Söderberg was born in Torpshammar, but his family moved to Solna when he was three years old. He started playing football at age seven in Råsunda IS, later AIK. His nickname became Liston.

Söderberg played for AIK, GIF Sundsvall, Ljusdals IF and Ulriksdals SK between 1959 and 1972. He represented the Sweden U19, U21, B, and A teams between 1959 and 1965, winning one cap for the senior team.

== Coaching career ==
Söderberg coached Ljusdals IF, Ulriksdals SK, Gefle IF, Västerås SK, IFK Eskilstuna, Odds BK, Vasalunds IF, Ikast FS, Syrianska FC, Anorthosis Famagusta, IFK Malmö and Köpings FF.

== Personal life and death ==
Söderberg died on 13 October 2022, at the age of 81.
