= Filip Almström-Tähti =

Swedish footballer

Personal information
- Full name: Filip Juhani Almström-Tähti
- Date of birth: 22 June 1991 (age 35)
- Height: 1.73 m (5 ft 8 in)
- Position: Defender

Team information
- Current team: FC Stockholm Internazionale

Youth career
- Älta IF
- Hammarby Talang FF

Senior career*
| Years | Team | Apps | (Gls) |
| 2011 | Nacka FF | 23 | (0) |
| 2013–2014 | Huddinge IF | | |
| 2015–2016 | IK Frej | 30 | (0) |
| 2017 | Notodden FK | 20 | (0) |
| 2018–2019 | Örgryte IS | 48 | (4) |
| 2020–2021 | Västerås SK | 37 | (0) |
| 2021 | IFK Mariehamn | 12 | (0) |
| 2022– | FC Stockholm Internazionale | 0 | (0) |
- * Club domestic league appearances and goals as of 29 November 2021

Filip Almström-Tähti (born 22 June 1991) is a Swedish professional footballer who plays as a defender for FC Stockholm Internazionale.
