= Västerås SK Fotboll =

Swedish football club

Västerås
- Full name: Västerås Sportklubb
- Nickname: Grönvitt (Green-White)
- Founded: 29 January 1904; 122 years ago
- Ground: Hitachi Energy Arena, Västerås
- Capacity: 8,750
- Chairman: Stefan Brandberg
- Head coach: Alexander Rubin
- League: Allsvenskan
- 2025: Superettan, 1st of 16 (champions)
- Website: www.vskfotboll.nu
Home colours	Away colours

Västerås Sportklubb, commonly known as Västerås SK or VSK, is a Swedish professional football club based in Västerås. The club is affiliated with Västmanlands Fotbollförbund and play their home games at the Hitachi Energy Arena since 2008.

Formed on 29 January 1904, the club is currently playing in Allsvenskan for the sixth season ever after winning Superettan in 2025 and securing promotion back to the top division.

== History ==
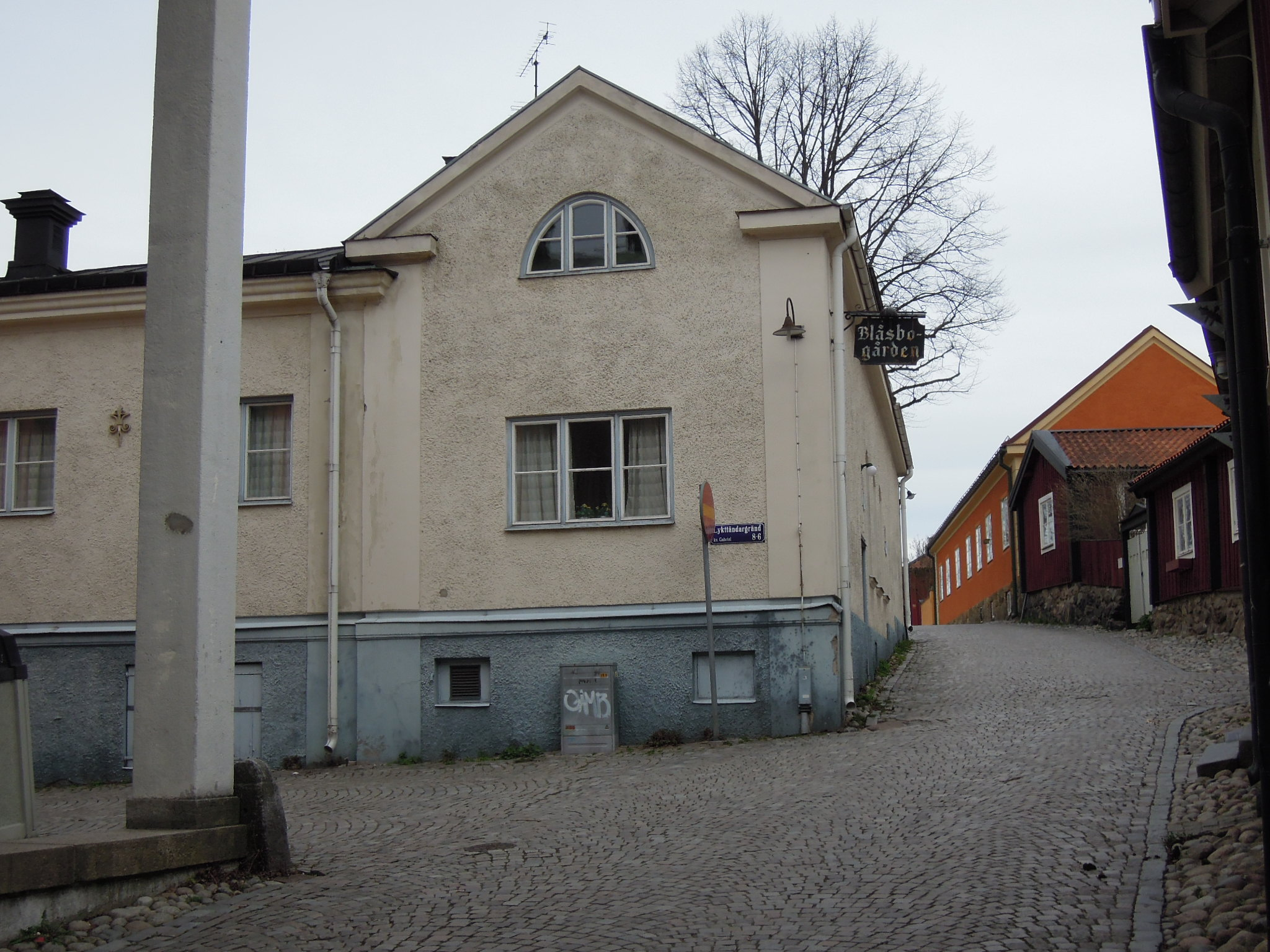
Blåsbogården, where the club was originally founded.

In 1904 a group of teenage friends led by Krispin Svärd gathered together in the local people's house Blåsbogården to found a new sports club in Västerås. The club badge was designed by eighteen-year-old Keo Ohlsson who took inspiration from the Västerås Municipality coat of arms. It is unknown why the colors green and white were chosen.

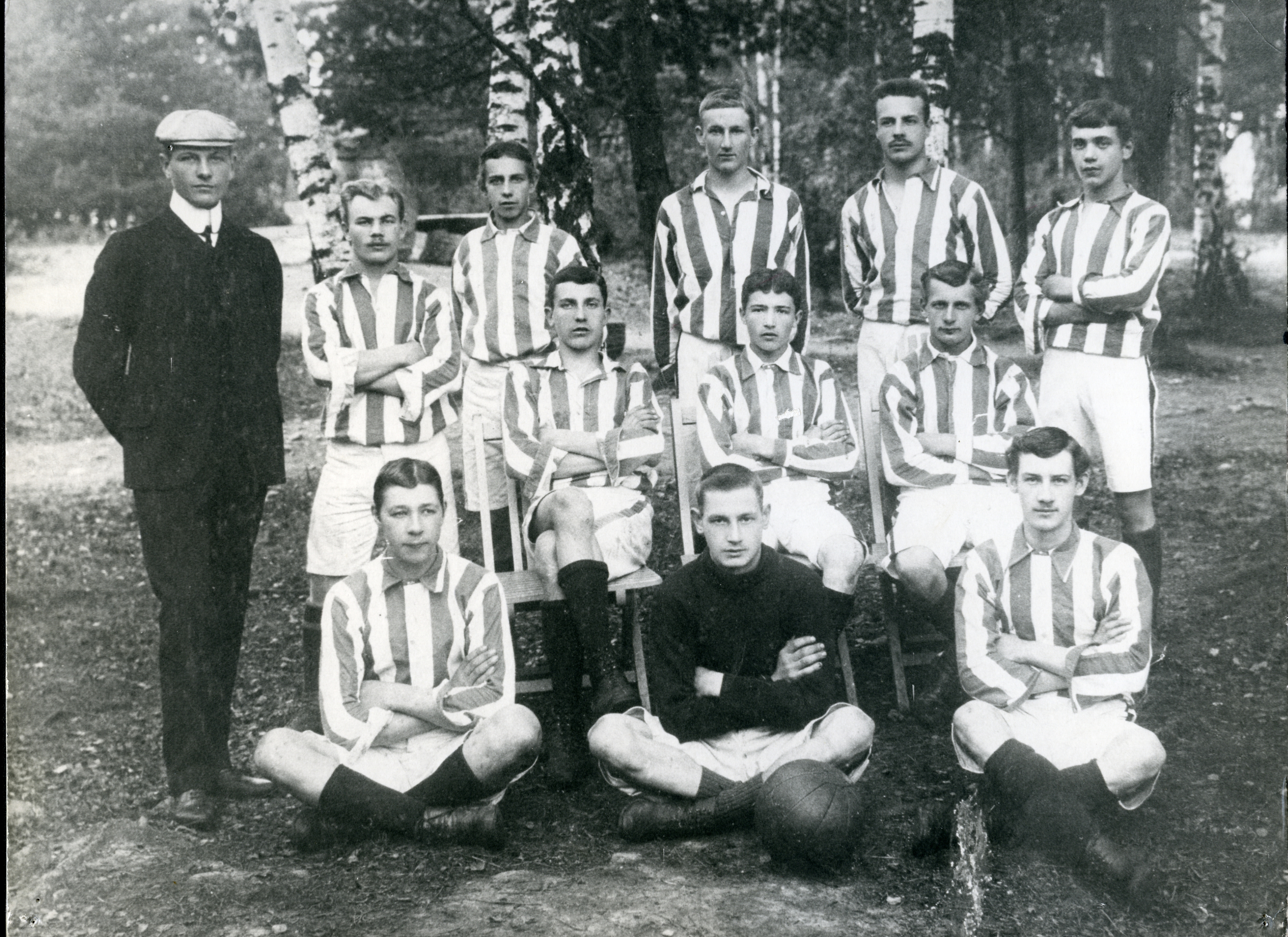
The original Västerås SK team of 1904.

The early years were mostly spent playing against other local clubs in the Djäkneberget park with the goal being to become the best team in the city. In 1905 they participated in the 1905 Svenska Mästerskapet which was a cup competition that decided the national champion at the time, before the swedish football league system had been organized. They beat local rival IFK Västerås in the first round but then left a walkover for the second round away against IFK Örebro.

Fifty years later they reached the highest division of swedish football for the first time ever as they participated in the 1955–56 Allsvenskan season. They managed to avoid relegation by three points and also recorded their largest ever home attendance of 14,208 spectators. That 10th place finish still remains the clubs best ever to this day. Their stay in the top flight would only last for two years though as the very next season they were relegated back down again.

In 1978 and 1997 the club had two more single season stints in Allsvenskan before the success of recent years, both times under the leadership of coach Lennart "Liston" Söderberg.

== Kit ==
Västerås SK play in green and white horizontally striped shirts with white shorts and socks. But shirts with vertical stripes and fully white shirts have also occurred in their history.

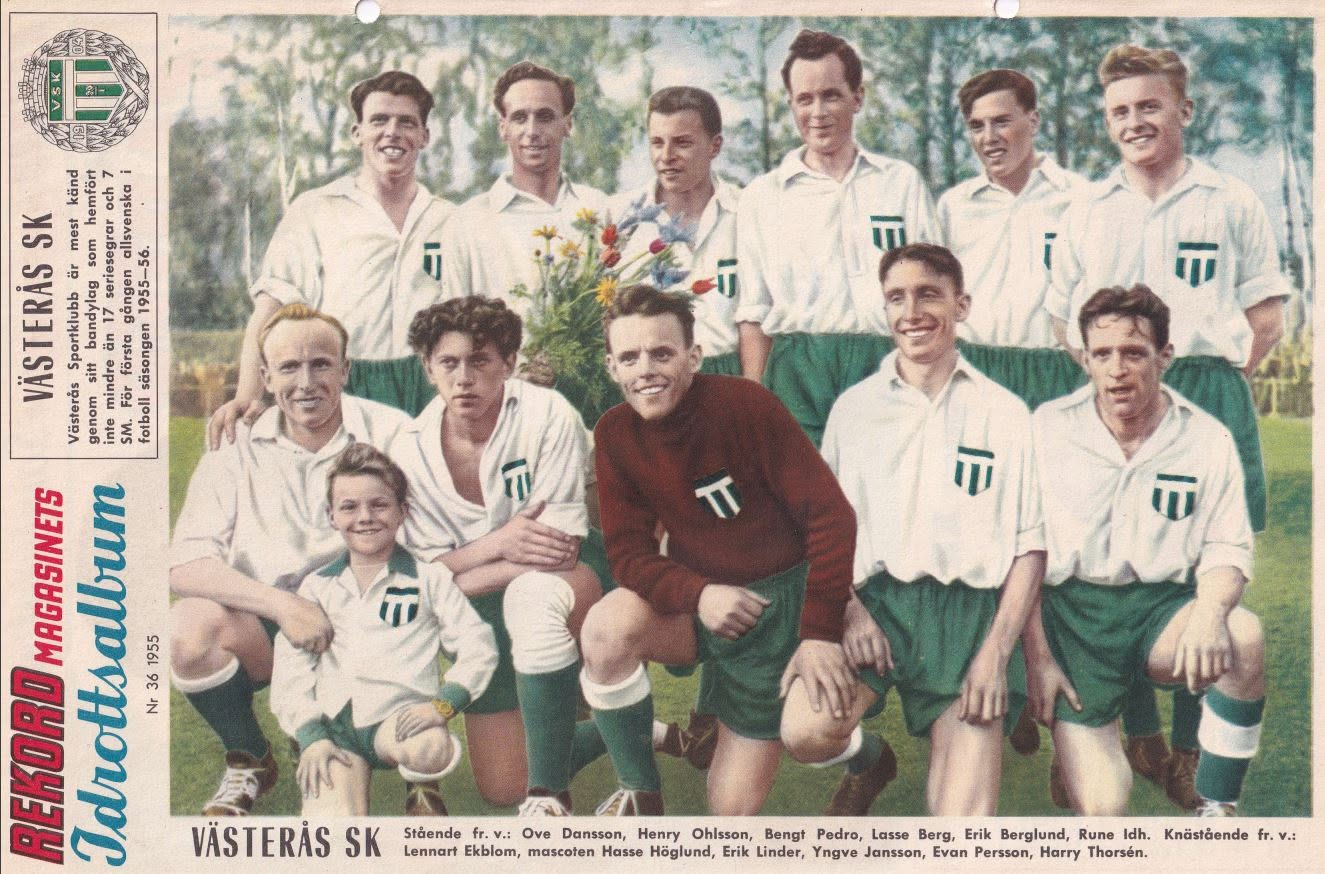
Västerås SK wearing fully white shirts during the 1955–56 Allsvenskan season.

Period	Kit manufacturer	Shirt sponsor (chest)
1995	(Italy) Diadora	Ford
1997	(England) Umbro	ABB
1998	(England) Umbro	Rank Xerox
1999–2004	(England) Umbro	None
2006	(United States) Nike	MJP Bygg
2007–2011	(United States) Nike	None
2012	(United States) Nike	ABB
2013–2018	(United States) Nike	None
2019	(United States) Nike	ABAX
2020–2021	(United States) Nike	Kinnarps
2022–2023	(Germany) Puma	Kinnarps
2024	(Germany) Puma	Telexia
2025–	(Germany) Puma	Hitachi

== Recent seasons ==
Summary of the ten most recent seasons for Västerås SK:

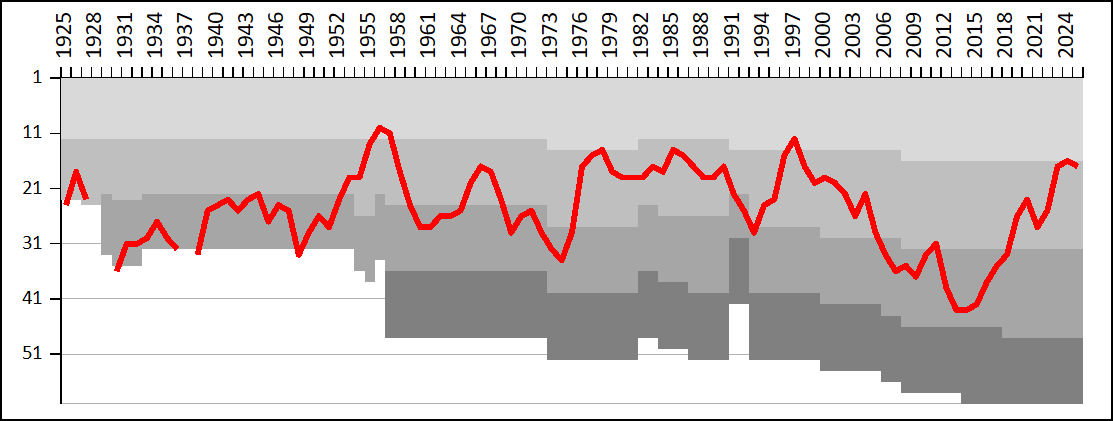
A chart showing the progress of Västerås SK through the swedish football league system. The different shades of gray represent league divisions.

Season	Division	Tier	Pos	Pl	W	D	L	+	-	P	Cup	Attendances
2016	Ettan	3	6	26	9	8	9	51	39	35	2nd round	1,490
2017	Ettan	3	3	26	14	3	9	53	32	45	1st round	1,754
2018	Ettan	3	↑ 1	30	22	2	6	56	26	68	2nd round	2,062
2019	Superettan	2	10	30	8	10	12	41	40	34	Group stage	2,291
2020	Superettan	2	7	30	11	6	13	40	44	39	Semifinals	0
2021	Superettan	2	12	30	8	12	10	36	40	36	2nd round	847
2022	Superettan	2	9	30	10	10	10	50	49	40	Group stage	1,488
2023	Superettan	2	↑ 1	30	19	6	5	48	24	63	Group stage	3,782
2024	Allsvenskan	1	↓ 16	30	6	5	19	26	43	23	Group stage	6,331
2025	Superettan	2	↑ 1	30	20	5	5	62	30	65	Group stage	4,502

== Stadiums ==
Västerås SK play their home games at the Hitachi Energy Arena, which is part of the larger Rocklunda IP sports area in the outskirts of the city that feature a range of different stadiums for several sports. It was built in 2008 and has a max capacity of 8,750 people for the 2026 Allsvenskan season. Before moving into their new stadium the club played at Arosvallen, built in 1932, which hosted two games of the 1958 FIFA World Cup.

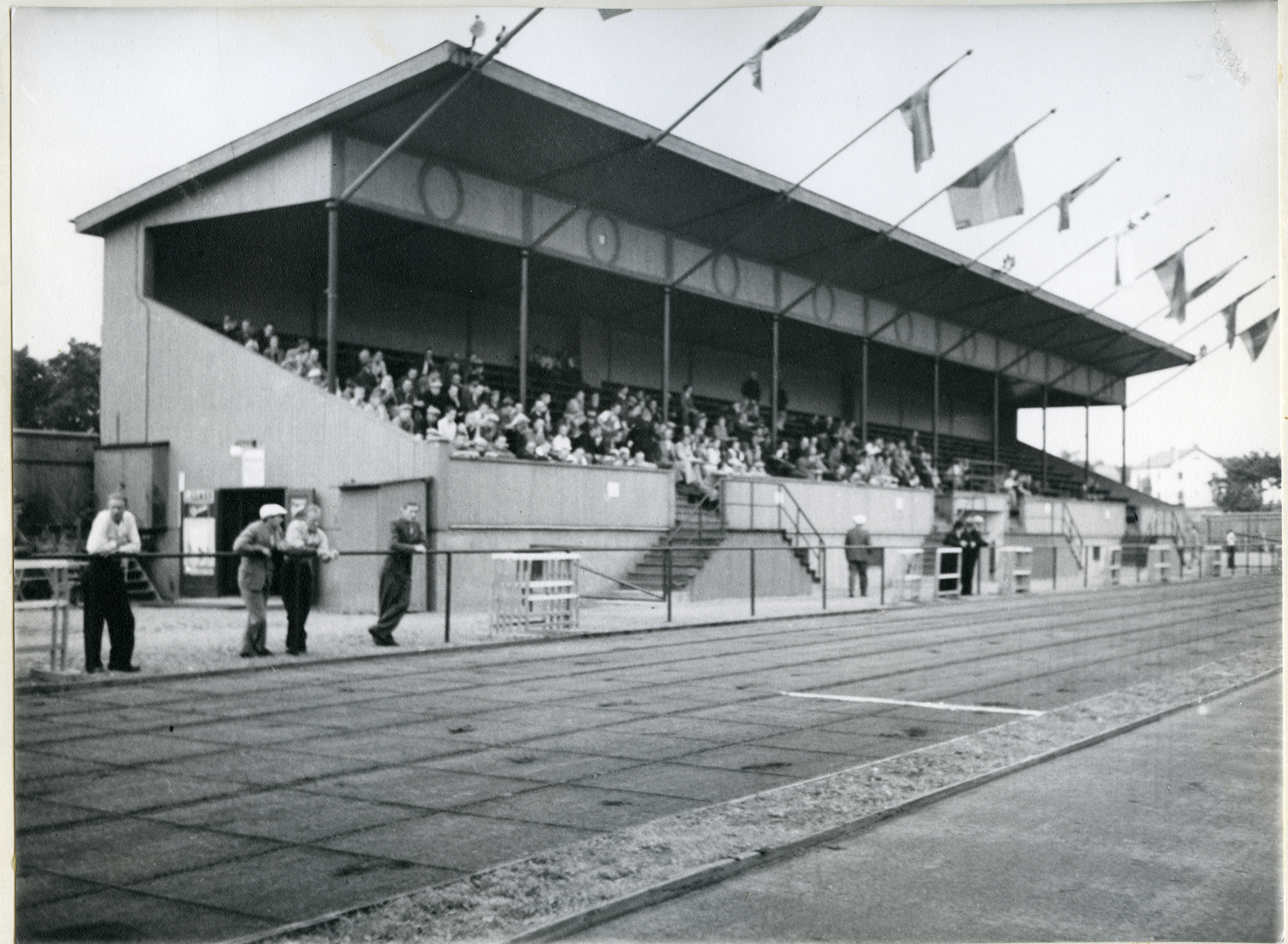
The main stand of the clubs old stadium Arosvallen in 1937.

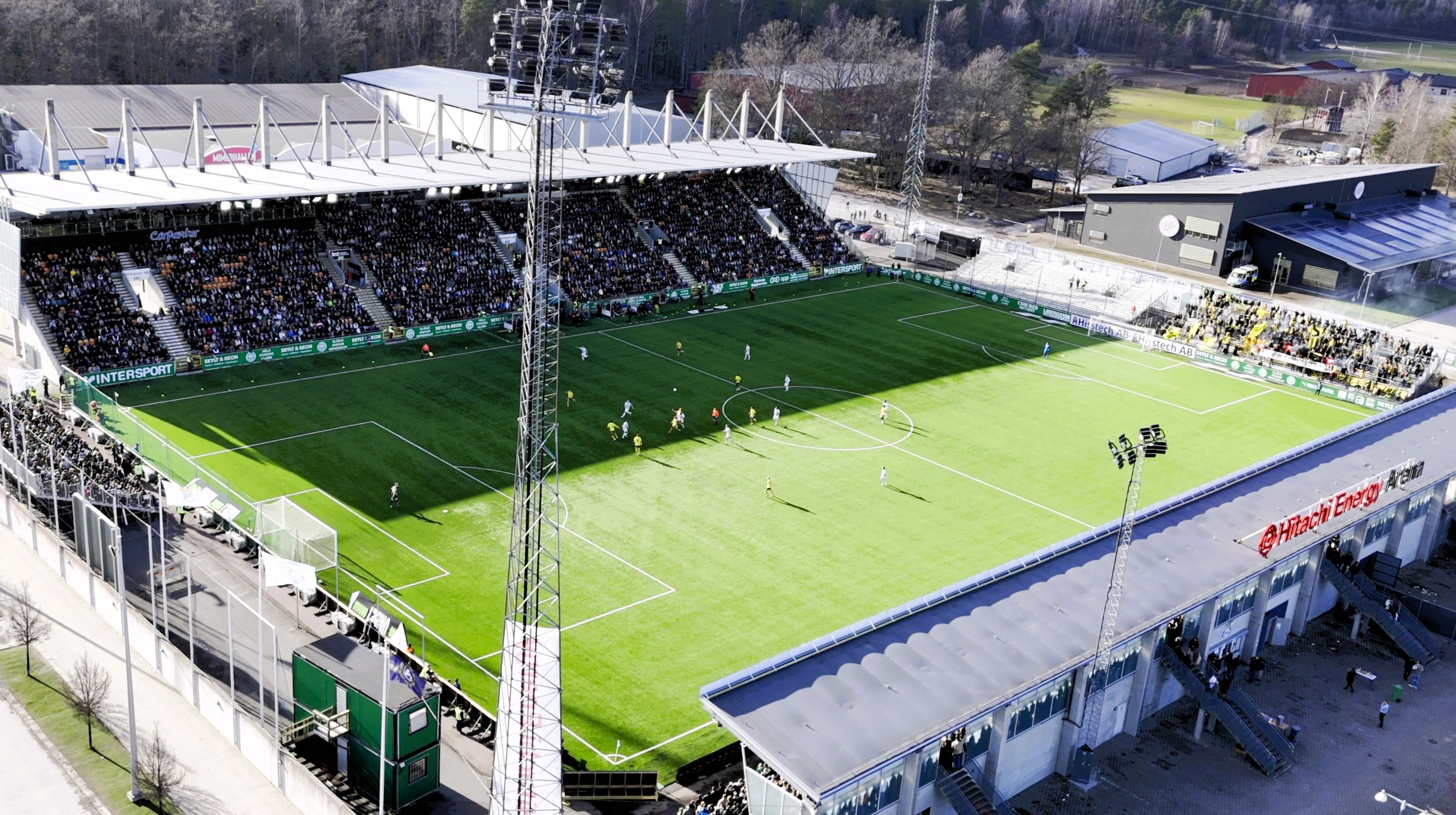
Their current home stadium Hitachi Energy Arena.

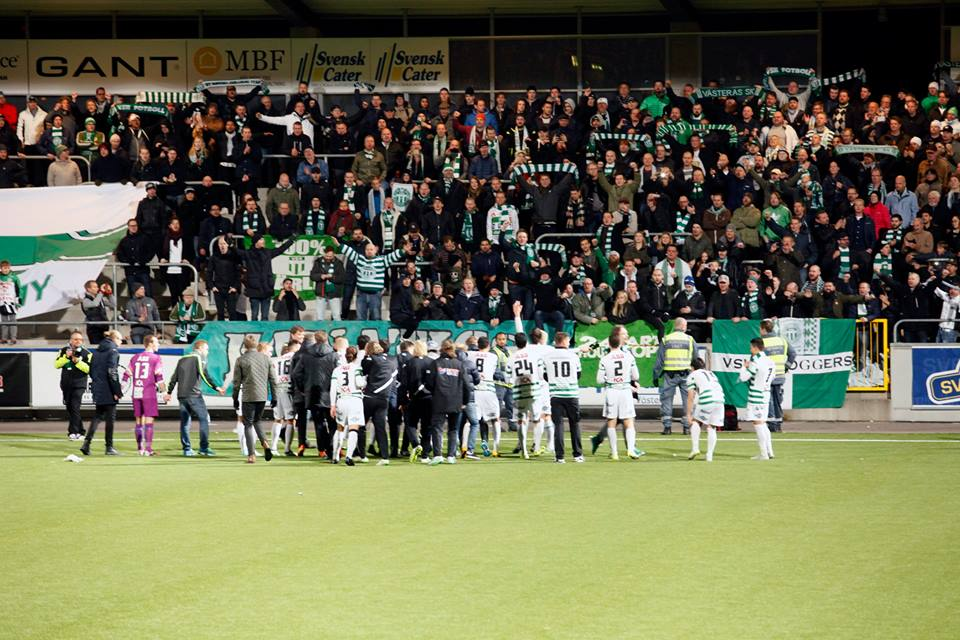
The team thanking the supporters in their home stadium after the last game of 2015.

== Players ==
As of 3 September 2026

Note: Flags indicate national team as defined under FIFA eligibility rules; some limited exceptions apply. Players may hold more than one non-FIFA nationality.

No.	Pos.	Nation	Player
1	GK	SWE	Anton Fagerström
2	DF	SWE	Herman Magnusson
3	DF	DEN	Marcus Baggesen
4	DF	SWE	Philip Bonde
5	MF	SWE	Karl Gunnarsson
7	FW	SWE	Abdelrahman Boudah (on loan from Albirex Niigata)
8	MF	SEN	Mamadou Diagne
9	FW	DEN	Casper Risbjerg
10	MF	SWE	Jonathan Ring
11	MF	SWE	Simon Gefvert
14	MF	KOS	Ismet Lushaku
15	DF	SWE	Jonathan Karlsson (on loan from Hammarby)
16	FW	CGO	Bonaventure Lendambi
17	MF	BFA	Axel Taonsa

No.	Pos.	Nation	Player
18	DF	BDI	Frédéric Nsabiyumva
19	MF	SWE	Jens Magnusson
20	MF	SWE	Melvin Ljungqvist
21	DF	SWE	Victor Wernersson
22	DF	SWE	Leonardo Bark
23	DF	SWE	Peter Amoran
24	DF	SWE	Jack Tagesson
25	GK	BRA	André Bernardini
26	MF	SWE	Levi Hansas
27	FW	SEN	Moussa Diallo
28	DF	GUI	Madiou Keita
30	MF	FRO	Mattias Hellisdal
32	MF	SWE	Musab Abdi Mohamud
34	GK	SWE	Elis Jäger

=== Out on loan ===
Note: Flags indicate national team as defined under FIFA eligibility rules; some limited exceptions apply. Players may hold more than one non-FIFA nationality.

No.	Pos.	Nation	Player
23	MF	SWE	Lucas Sibelius (at Varbergs BoIS until 30 November 2026)

=== Retired number(s) ===
Note: Flags indicate national team as defined under FIFA eligibility rules; some limited exceptions apply. Players may hold more than one non-FIFA nationality.

No.	Pos.	Nation	Player
12		SWE	Fans of the club

=== Notable players ===
Players included in the article series about the 20 greatest Västerås SK players of all time by the Västerås-based newspaper VLT:

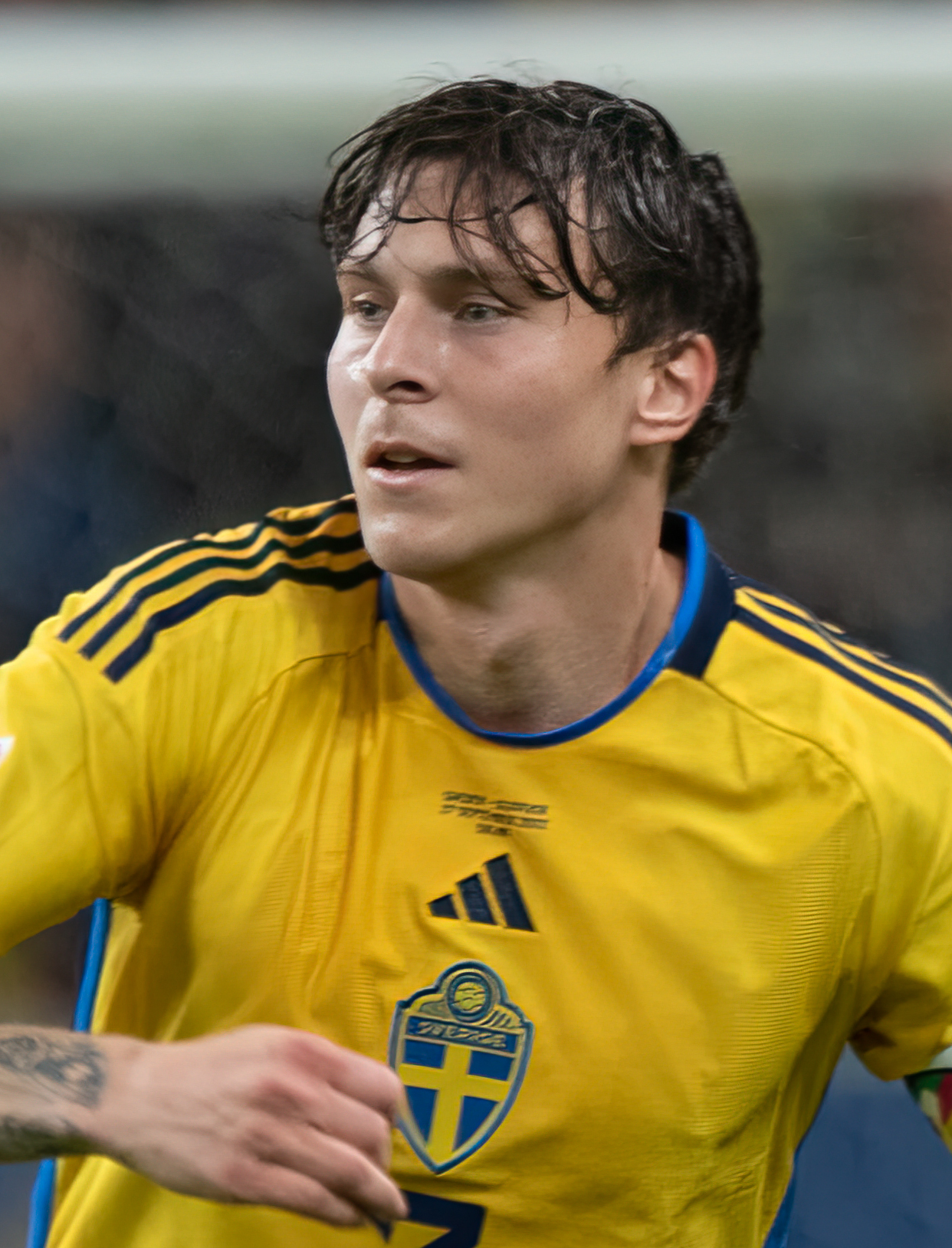
Västerås native Victor Lindelöf started playing first team football for the club at the age of fifteen.

Name	Years
(Sweden) Victor Lindelöf	2009–2012
(Sweden) Peter Markstedt	1991–1997, 2000, 2005
(Sweden) Stefan Bärlin	1994–1997, 2003–2004, 2008–2011
(Sweden) Ove Dansson	1942–1959
(Denmark) Knud Engedal	1970–1978
(Sweden) Johan Svensson	1992–2008
(Sweden) Stig Fredriksson	1977–1981
(Sweden) Thomas Andersson	1988–1990, 1995–1997, 2002
(Sweden) Pontus Kåmark	1985–1989
(Sweden) Lars Pettersson	1946–1955
(Sweden) Joonas Botold	2001–2008
(England) Graham Howell	1976–1982
(Sweden) Jonny Rödlund	1987, 1994, 1997–1999
(Sweden) Daniel Majstorovic	1998–2000
(Sweden) Fredrik Stenman	1999–2002
(Sweden) Jonas Hellgren	2010–2011, 2016–2021
(Sweden) Filip Tronêt	2010–2011, 2012, 2016–2023
(Sweden) Oskar Wahlström	2000–2003, 2010–2011
(Sweden) Oscar Pehrsson	2008–2012
(Sweden) Karwan Safari	2015–2020

== Management ==
=== Organisation ===
As of 16 August 2026

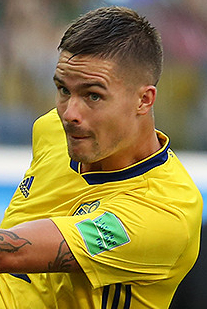
Former Sweden men's national football team player Mikael Lustig is currently the head of football at Västerås SK.

Name	Role
(Sweden) Robin Hals	Club director
(Sweden) Billy Magnusson	Sporting director
(Sweden) Mikael Lustig	Head of football
(New Zealand) James Vaughan	Director of youth academy
(Sweden) Oscar Norrby	Development director of youth academy
(Sweden) Victor Bergman	Youth coordinator
(Sweden) Lee Larsson	Event coordinator
(Sweden) Charlotta Åström	Financial manager
(Sweden) Lovisa Sjöblom	Content producer
(Sweden) Fabian Tapia Rosales	Business-to-Consumer
(Sweden) Caroline Breed	Sales
(Sweden) Martin Nilsson	Sales

=== Technical staff ===
As of 16 August 2026

Name	Role
(Sweden) Alexander Rubin	Head coach
(Sweden) Anton Höglund	Assistant coach
(Sweden) Johannes Petersson	Goalkeeping coach
(Sweden) Joel Bäckström	Analyst
(Sweden) Felix Siljebäck Larsen	Fitness coach
(Sweden) Alexander Larsson	Physiotherapist
(Sweden) David Björkman	Chiropractor
(Sweden) Wilhelm Westergren	Leader
(Sweden) (Turkey) Fehmi Sezgir	Equipment manager

=== Previous Managers ===
- (Sweden) Helmer Dahlborg (1928)
- (Sweden) Sten Mellgren (1930)
- (Hungary) Lajos Czeizler (1940)
- (Sweden) Henning Kjell (1940–43)
- (Sweden) Carl Larsson (1943)
- (Sweden) Erik Holmquist (1951)
- (Germany) Werner Löwenthal (1952)
- (Sweden) Ynge Johansson (1953)
- (Sweden) Börje Wretman (1954)
- (Sweden) Birger Wretman (1955–1956)
- (Austria) Karl Pannagl (1956–1957)
- (Sweden) Börje Wretman (1957–1958)
- (Sweden) Rune Berglund (1958–1959)
- (Sweden) Ola Gärdin (1960)
- (Sweden) Bengt Lindholm (1961–1962)
- (Sweden) Ove Danson (1963–1964)
- (Sweden) Stig Genberg (1965–1966)
- (Sweden) Lars-Erik Ahlberg (1967–1969)
- (Sweden) Hans Björkman (1970)
- (Sweden) Helge Antlind (1971–1972)
- (Denmark) Knud Engedal (1972)
- (Denmark) Jimmie Damgaard (1972–1974)
- (Sweden) Lennart Söderberg (1975–1980)
- (Sweden) Lars-Åke Bäckström (1981–1982)
- (Sweden) Sven-Erik Käll (1983–1984)
- (Sweden) Thomas Lundin (1985–1987)
- (Sweden) Svante Larsson (1988)
- (Sweden) Harry Svensson (1989)
- (Sweden) Anders Wengrud (1990–1991)
- (Sweden) Leif Klingborg and (Sweden) Sven-Erik Wessberg (1992)
- (Sweden) Sven-Erik Wessberg (1993–1994)
- (Sweden) Lennart Söderberg (1994–1997)
- (England) Graham Howell (1997)
- (Sweden) Bo Petersson (1997)
- (Sweden) Peter Nilsson (1998–1999)
- (Sweden) Leif Klingborg (1999)
- (Sweden) Kjell Jonevret (1999–2000)
- (Sweden) Kent Karlsson (2001–2002)
- (Sweden) Leif Klingborg (2003)
- (Sweden) Lennart Söderberg (2004)
- (England) Richard Money (2004)
- (Sweden) Per Gidlund (2005)
- (Sweden) Kjell Friman (2005)
- (Sweden) Peter Markstedt (2005)
- (Sweden) Sören Cratz (2006–2007)
- (Sweden) Hans Johansson (2007–2008)
- (Sweden) Jörgen Zetterström (2009)
- (Sweden) Kalle Granath (2010–2011)
- (Sweden) (Turkey) Erik Acar (2011–2013)
- (Sweden) (Iran) Ramin Kiani (2013–2014)
- (Sweden) Fredrik Ramström (2014)
- (Sweden) Peter Markstedt and (Sweden) Leif Berg (2015)
- (Sweden) Johan Mjällby (2016–2018)
- (Sweden) Tor-Arne Fredheim (2018)
- (Sweden) Thomas Gabrielsson (2018–2019)
- (Sweden) Peter Markstedt and (Sweden) Leif Berg (2019)
- (Sweden) Thomas Askebrand (2020–2021)
- (Sweden) Kalle Karlsson (2021–2025)
- (Sweden) Alexander Rubin (2026–)

== Achievements ==
- Division 1 Norra:
  - Winners (3): 1996, 2010, 2018
- Superettan:
  - Winners (2): 2023, 2025
