= Anton Fagerström =

Swedish footballer (born 1991)

Personal information
- Date of birth: 6 December 1991 (age 34)
- Height: 1.85 m (6 ft 1 in)
- Position: Goalkeeper

Team information
- Current team: Västerås SK
- Number: 1

Youth career
- IFK Visby
- Visby AIK
- IFK Norrköping

Senior career*
Years	Team	Apps	(Gls)
2009	IFK Norrköping	0	(0)
2010–2011	FC Gute	20	(0)
2012–2016	Nyköpings BIS	103	(0)
2016–2017	Örebro SK	0	(0)
2018–	Västerås SK	196	(0)
- * Club domestic league appearances and goals as of 12 November 2025

Anton Fagerström (born 6 December 1991) is a Swedish footballer who plays as a goalkeeper for Västerås SK.

== Career ==
In his early career he played for IFK Visby, Visby AIK and IFK Norrköping. Having been benched 5 times for Norrköping's senior team in 2009, he moved back to Gotland and FC Gute in 2010, and made his senior debut for that club in the 2011 Division 2. After the season, he was given the GA Ball as the Player of the Year in Gotland.

In 2012, Fagerström started playing for Nyköpings BIS. After many years in Nyköping, he was signed by Örebro SK in July 2016 as a replacement for Jacob Rinne. He was out of contract at Nyköping.

After one year, Fagerström had still not played a league game and was doubtful regarding a renewal of his contract. Fagertröm ended up not playing a single league match for Örebro. He moved to Ettan club Västerås SK in 2018, winning promotion to Superettan in his first season. In 2019, interest in him was reportedly shown by Swedish teams as well as a Greek club.

In the 2023 Superettan, Fagerström experienced a career highlight as he was named Goalkeeper of the Year and Västerås won promotion to the 2024 Allsvenskan. He made his Allsvenskan debut on 1 April 2024 at the age of 32.

Västerås suffered relegation after one season. Fagerström's contract was also about to expire, but before 2024 was over, a one-year extension through 2025 was announced.

== Coaching ==
In 2019 and 2020, Fagerström was the goalkeeping coach for Västerås U19.
