= Karol Mets =

Estonian footballer (born 1993)

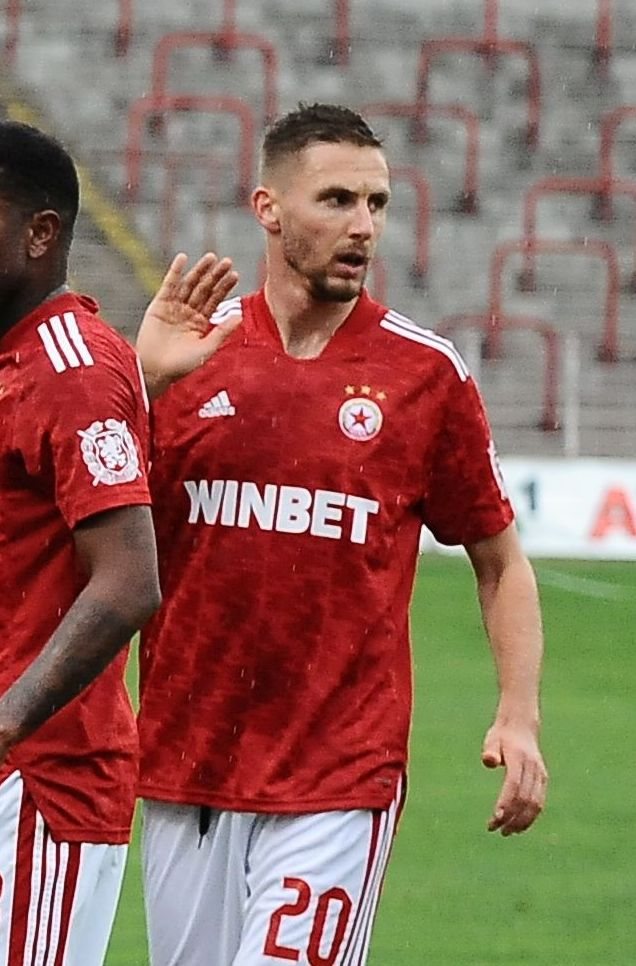
- Mets playing for CSKA Sofia in 2021

Personal information
- Date of birth: 16 May 1993 (age 33)
- Place of birth: Viljandi, Estonia
- Height: 1.91 m (6 ft 3 in)
- Positions: Centre-back; defensive midfielder

Team information
- Current team: VfL Bochum
- Number: 5

Youth career
- 2003–2009: Tulevik
- 2011: Flora

Senior career*
Years	Team	Apps	(Gls)
2009–2010	Tulevik II	51	(4)
2010	Warrior	4	(1)
2010–2014	Flora	115	(7)
2011–2012	Flora II	19	(3)
2014–2017	Viking	72	(0)
2017–2019	NAC Breda	40	(1)
2019–2020	AIK	46	(2)
2020–2021	Al-Ettifaq	23	(0)
2021–2022	CSKA Sofia	12	(0)
2022–2023	Zürich	25	(1)
2023	→ FC St. Pauli (loan)	17	(0)
2023–2026	FC St. Pauli	65	(1)
2026–	VfL Bochum	10	(0)

International career^{‡}
2009	Estonia U17	8	(0)
2010	Estonia U18	1	(0)
2010–2012	Estonia U19	32	(0)
2012–2014	Estonia U21	20	(0)
2013–	Estonia	109	(0)
- * Club domestic league appearances and goals as of 19:25, 28 August 2026 (UTC) ‡ National team caps and goals as of 16 November 2026 (UTC)

Karol Mets (Estonian: [ˈkɑrol mets]; born 16 May 1993) is an Estonian professional footballer who plays as a centre back or defensive midfielder for German 2. Bundesliga club VfL Bochum and the Estonia national team.

== Club career ==
=== Early football career in Estonia ===
Mets came through the Tulevik youth system, and played for the club's reserve sides Tulevik II and Warrior.

In November 2010, Mets was included in Flora's first team squad for pre-season training. He made his debut for the club on 1 March 2011, against Levadia in the Estonian Supercup match. Flora won 5–3 on penalties. Mets made his debut in the Meistriliiga on 2 April 2011 in a 1–0 away victory over Kuressaare. He soon established himself as Flora's first choice centre back alongside Karl Palatu. Mets helped Flora win the Meistriliiga title in 2011.

=== Viking ===
On 5 December 2014, Mets signed a three-year contract with Norwegian club Viking. He made his debut in the Tippeligaen on 6 April 2015 in a 1–0 away loss to Mjøndalen.

=== NAC Breda ===
On 31 July 2017, Mets joined Eredivisie club NAC Breda on a three-year deal for an undisclosed fee, rumored to be around €100,000. He made his debut in the Eredivisie in a 4–1 away loss to Vitesse on 12 August 2017, when he came on as a half-time substitute for Arno Verschueren. Mets scored his first goal for NAC Breda on 20 September 2017, in a 4–3 loss to Achilles '29 in the first round of the KNVB Cup.

=== AIK ===
On 14 March 2019, Mets signed a three-year contract with Swedish champions AIK for a fee of €300,000. He made his debut in the Allsvenskan on 31 March 2019, in a 0–0 home draw against Östersund.

=== Later career ===
On 2 October 2020, Mets signed a three-year contract with Saudi club Al-Ettifaq. On 10 August 2021, he signed a contract with Bulgarian club CSKA Sofia until the end of 2021–22 season. On 7 January 2022, Mets signed with Swiss club Zürich until June 2024.

On 5 January 2023, Mets joined 2. Bundesliga club St. Pauli on loan from Zürich until the end of the season with an option to buy, which the club eventually bought at the end of season. Mets played all games of the 2023–24 season in the starting line-up, only missed out 2 games due to a red card. St. Pauli won the league and were promoted to the Bundesliga for the 2024–25 season. However, Mets only recorded 10 appearances in the Bundesliga before a knee injury he sustained in November 2024 resulted in him missing the rest of the season.

On 17 July 2026, Mets signed a two-season contract with VfL Bochum in 2. Bundesliga.

== International career ==
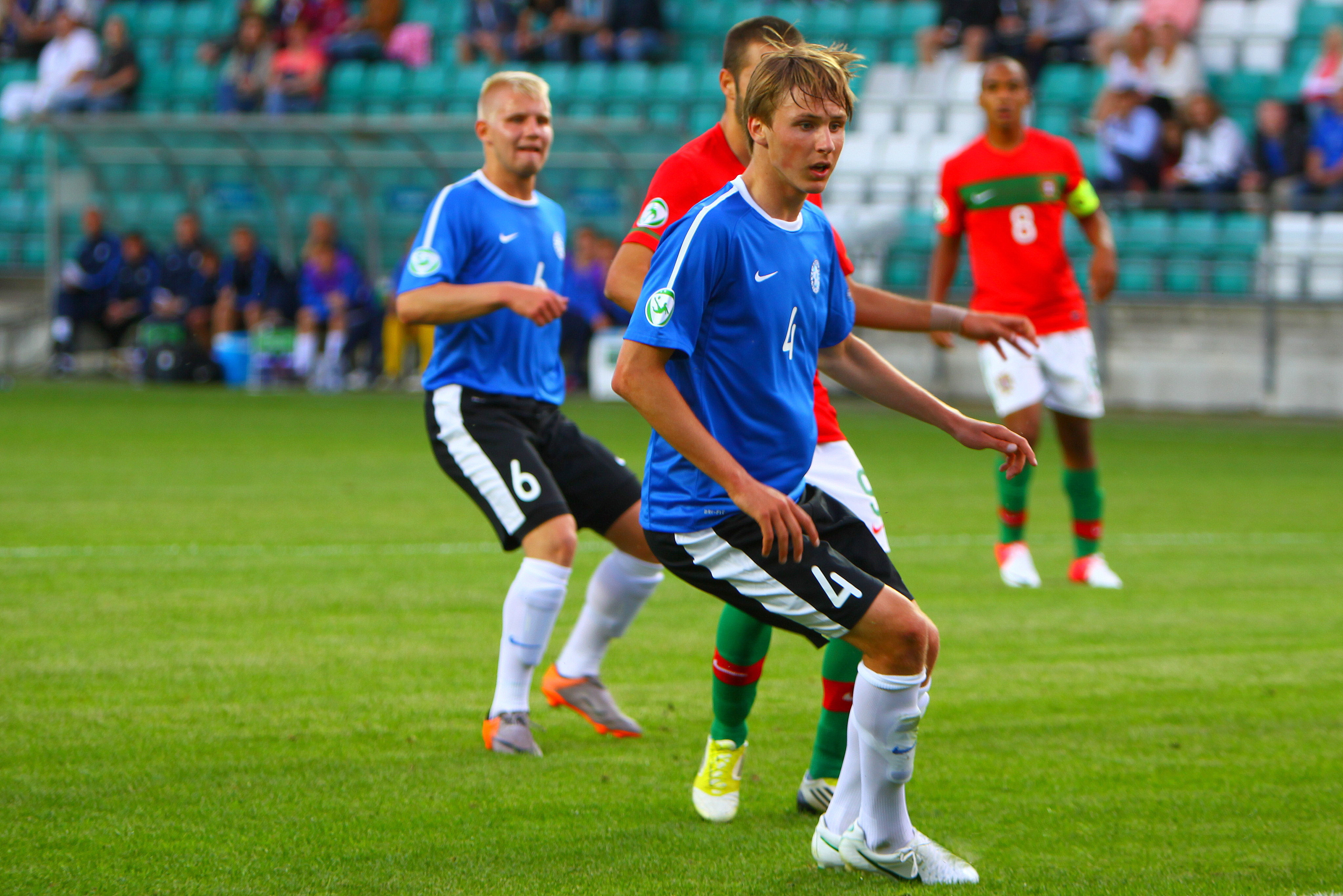
Mets playing against Portugal at the 2012 UEFA European Under-19 Championship

On 19 November 2013, Mets debuted for Estonian senior squad in a 3–0 friendly away against over Liechtenstein. On 19 November 2024, he featured in his 100th international match against Slovakia during the UEFA Nations League.

== Career statistics ==
=== Club ===
As of match played 28 August 2026

Appearances and goals by club, season and competition
Club	Season	League			Cup (Note: Includes Estonian Cup, Norwegian Cup, KNVB Cup, Svenska Cupen, King Cup, Bulgarian Cup, Swiss Cup, DFB-Pokal)		Europe		Other		Total	
Club	Season	Division	Apps	Goals	Apps	Goals	Apps	Goals	Apps	Goals	Apps	Goals
Tulevik II	2009	Esiliiga	28	3	3	0	—		1 (Note: Appearance in Esiliiga relegation play-offs)	0	32	3
Tulevik II	2010	II liiga	23	1	—		—		—		23	1
Tulevik II	Total		51	4	3	0	—		1	0	55	4
Warrior	2010	Esiliiga	4	1	0	0	—		0	0	4	1
Flora II	2011	Esiliiga	17	1	0	0	—		—		17	1
Flora II	2012	Esiliiga	2	2	0	0	—		—		2	2
Flora II	Total		19	3	0	0	—		—		19	3
Flora	2011	Meistriliiga	16	1	3	1	0	0	3 (Note: Two appearances in Baltic Champions Cup, one appearance in Estonian Supercup)	0	22	2
Flora	2012	Meistriliiga	32	4	3	0	2 (Note: Appearances in UEFA Champions League)	0	0	0	37	4
Flora	2013	Meistriliiga	32	2	4	0	2 (Note: Appearances in UEFA Europa League)	0	—		38	2
Flora	2014	Meistriliiga	35	0	3	2	—		0	0	38	2
Flora	Total		115	7	13	3	4	0	3	0	135	10
Viking	2015	Tippeligaen	28	0	6	0	—		—		34	0
Viking	2016	Tippeligaen	29	0	3	0	—		—		32	0
Viking	2017	Eliteserien	15	0	2	0	—		—		17	0
Viking	Total		72	0	11	0	—		—		83	0
NAC Breda	2017–18	Eredivisie	25	0	1	1	—		—		26	1
NAC Breda	2018–19	Eredivisie	15	1	1	0	—		—		16	1
NAC Breda	Total		40	1	2	1	—		—		42	2
AIK	2019	Allsvenskan	26	1	0	0	—		—		26	1
AIK	2020	Allsvenskan	20	1	5	0	8	0	—		33	1
AIK	Total		46	2	5	0	8	0	—		59	2
Al-Ettifaq	2020–21	Saudi Pro League	23	0	1	0	—		—		24	0
CSKA Sofia	2021–22	Bulgarian First League	12	0	2	0	0	0	0	0	14	0
Zürich	2021–22	Swiss Super League	12	1	—		—		—		12	1
Zürich	2022–23	Swiss Super League	13	0	0	0	6 (Note: Appearances in UEFA Europa League)	0	—		19	0
Zürich	Total		25	1	0	0	6	0	—		31	1
FC St. Pauli (loan)	2022–23	2. Bundesliga	17	0	—		—		—		17	0
FC St. Pauli	2023–24	2. Bundesliga	32	0	4	0	—		—		36	0
FC St. Pauli	2024–25	Bundesliga	10	0	2	0	—		—		12	0
FC St. Pauli	2025–26	Bundesliga	23	1	3	0	—		—		26	1
FC St. Pauli	St. Pauli total		82	1	9	0	—		—		91	1
VfL Bochum	2026–27	2. Bundesliga	3	0	1	0	—		—		4	0
Career total			492	19	47	4	18	0	4	0	553	24

=== International ===
As of match played 16 November 2026

Appearances and goals by national team and year
National team	Year	Apps	Goals
Estonia	2013	1	0
Estonia	2014	13	0
Estonia	2015	9	0
Estonia	2016	13	0
Estonia	2017	9	0
Estonia	2018	7	0
Estonia	2019	9	0
Estonia	2020	4	0
Estonia	2021	10	0
Estonia	2022	9	0
Estonia	2023	7	0
Estonia	2024	9	0
Estonia	2025	4	0
Estonia	2026	5	0
Total		109	0

== Honours ==
Flora

- Meistriliiga: 2011
- Estonian Cup: 2012–13
- Estonian Supercup: 2011, 2012

Zürich

- Swiss Super League: 2021–22

FC St. Pauli

- 2.Bundesliga: 2023–24

Estonia

- Baltic Cup: 2021, 2024

Individual

- Estonian Footballer of the Year: 2023, 2024
- Estonian Young Footballer of the Year: 2014
