= Daniel Björkman =

Swedish footballer (born 1993)

Personal information
- Full name: Lars Daniel Björkman
- Date of birth: 21 February 1993 (age 33)
- Place of birth: Falun, Sweden
- Height: 1.84 m (6 ft 0 in)
- Position: Centre-back

Team information
- Current team: Falu BS (assistant)

Youth career
- Samuelsdals IF
- IK Brage

Senior career*
Years	Team	Apps	(Gls)
2012–2014	IK Brage	16	(0)
2015–2018	BK Forward	66	(4)
2019–2020	Örebro SK	13	(0)
2021	KÍ	10	(1)
2022–2024	BK Forward	31	(1)
2024	Falu BS	0	(0)
- * Club domestic league appearances and goals

Lars Daniel Björkman (born 21 February 1993) is a Swedish former professional footballer who played as a centre-back. He has previously played for KÍ, Örebro SK, IK Brage, and BK Forward. He is currently assistant coach of Falu BS.

== Career ==
Björkman started his football career with Samuelsdals IF in Falun. In 2012, he moved to IK Brage, before joining Örebro-based club BK Forward in 2015.

After strong performances in 2018, several clubs showed interest. Björkman had trials with AIK, IFK Göteborg, and Örebro SK. Eventually, he signed a two-year contract with Örebro SK. In February 2021, Björkman moved to Faroe Islands Premier League club KÍ on a one-year contract. He left the club after his contract expired in December 2021.

In July 2022, Björkman returned to BK Forward. Ahead of the 2024 season, Björkman moved to Falu BS. He never played a competitive match for the club due to injury. He retired from football and became assistant coach of the club.

== Honours ==
KÍ

- Faroe Islands Premier League: 2021
