= Panajotis Dimitriadis =

Swedish association football player

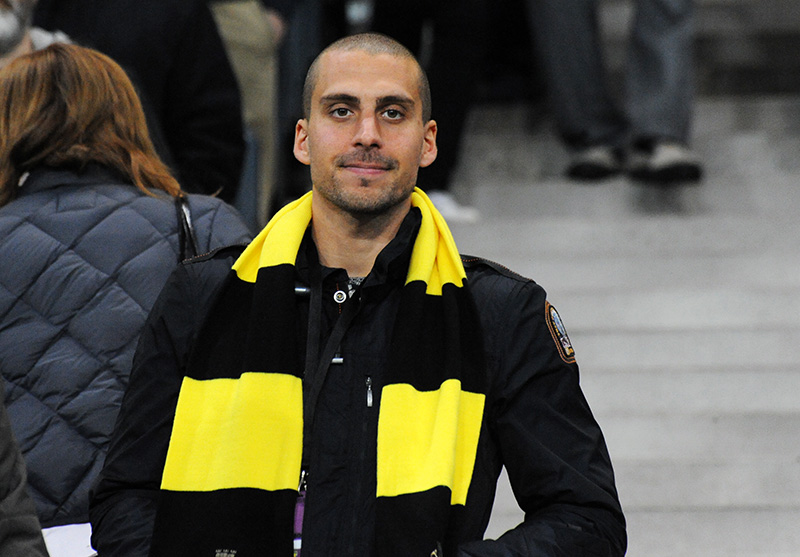

Personal information
- Full name: Panajotis Dimitriadis
- Date of birth: 12 August 1986 (age 40)
- Place of birth: Stockholm, Sweden
- Height: 1.81 m (5 ft 11 in)
- Position: Utility player

Team information
- Current team: Akropolis

Youth career
- AIK
- Djurgården

Senior career*
Years	Team	Apps	(Gls)
2007–2009	Vasalund	74	(12)
2010–2012	Sandefjord	87	(11)
2013–2014	Brommapojkarna	25	(2)
2014–2015	AIK	15	(0)
2015–2016	Gençlerbirliği	13	(1)
2016–2018	Giresunspor	59	(8)
2018–2020	AIK	47	(1)
2021–	Akropolis	28	(0)
- * Club domestic league appearances and goals as of 5 December 2021

Panajotis "Panos" Dimitriadis (born 12 August 1986) is a Greek-Swedish professional footballer who plays for Akropolis. Known for his ability to play in several positions, at AIK he was mainly considered a central defender, but is also an option as a defensive midfielder (his preferred position), offensive midfielder or wing-back.

Dimitriadis started his career at AIK's and Djurgården's respective youth departments, before he joined Vasalund and played for the team in Superettan. He joined the Tippeligaen side Sandefjord in 2010, and stayed at the club after their relegation to Adeccoligaen. He joined Brommapojkarna ahead of the 2013 season, before he returned to his youth-club AIK ahead of the 2014 season.

== Career ==
A Swedish-Greek, Dimitriadis was born in Stockholm. During his youth he played for both Djurgården and AIK, and he was named "youth player of the year" at Djurgården in 2004. He played 45 matches and scored 10 goals for Vasalund in Swedish Division 1 from 2007 to 2008, and was on an unsuccessful trial with his youth-club in January 2009.

After playing 29 matches and scoring two goals for Vasalund in the 2009 Superettan, Dimitriadis was bought by the Tippeligaen side Sandefjord. Dimitriadis was brought to the Norwegian club as a back-up for the midfielders Marciano and Ebrima Sohna, and signed a two-year contract with the club. Dimitriadis was injured in a pre-season match against Ljungskile along with Malick Mane, and Sandefjord's head coach Patrick Walker blamed the artificial turf in LSK-Hallen for the injuries. Dimitriadis recovered from the injury, and started the opening match of the 2010 season against Start on 14 March 2010. He played a total of 29 matches and scored four goals in 2010, when Sandefjord was relegated from Tippeligaen. Dimitriadis stayed at the club after the relegation.

Even though Dimitriadis is an offensive midfielder and have played as a forward he was used as a centre-back in the 2012 season, due to the injuries on Alexander Gabrielsen and Yaw Ihle Amankwah, with great success. After a match against Ullensaker/Kisa his teammate Eirik André Lamøy told the local newspaper Sandefjords Blad that if it was possible, he wanted to have several Dimitriadis playing in different positions which would make the team better.

Dimitriadis continued to play centre-back throughout the season due to injuries, and his performance as a defender got him on Thomas Berntsen in Norwegian TV 2's list as one of Adeccoligaen's five best players. Nenad Lukic, Dimitriadis' agent, later told that clubs from Sweden, Turkey and Greece was interested in signing the midfielder. Dimitriadis played all of the 30 league-matches and scored three goals in the 2012 season. He also scored a hat-trick in the promotion play-off match against Ullensaker/Kisa, which Sandefjord lost 4–3. His contract with Sandefjord expired after the 2012 season, and he returned to Sweden and Stockholm in February 2013 when he signed for the newly promoted Allsvenskan side Brommapojkarna. Ahead of the 2014 season, Dimitriadis joined his old youth-club AIK on a free transfer.

After a one and a half year stint in AIK, he signed for Gençlerbirliği in Turkey on 29 May 2015.

On 26 August 2016, he joined Giresunspor on a one-year contract.

On 4 July 2018, Dimitriadis signed for AIK for two years, making a return to Allsvenskan and Swedish football.

On 1 February 2021, Dimitriadis signed with Akropolis.

== Career statistics ==
As of 30 November 2013

Season	Club	Division	League		Cup		Total	
Season	Club	Division	Apps	Goals	Apps	Goals	Apps	Goals
2010	Sandefjord	Tippeligaen	29	4	3	0	32	4
2011	Sandefjord	Adeccoligaen	28	4	3	3	31	7
2012	Sandefjord	Adeccoligaen	30	3	5	2	35	5
2013	Brommapojkarna	Allsvenskan	25	2	1	0	26	2
Career Total			112	13	12	5	124	18

== Honours ==
AIK

- Allsvenskan: 2018
