= Oscar Pehrsson =

Swedish footballer (born 1988)

Personal information
- Full name: Oscar Pehrsson
- Date of birth: 10 April 1988 (age 38)
- Place of birth: Skerike, Sweden
- Height: 1.92 m (6 ft 4 in)
- Position: Centre back

Senior career*
| Years | Team | Apps | (Gls) |
| 2005 | Gideonsbergs IF | | |
| 2006–2012 | Västerås SK | 124 | (10) |
| 2006 | → Gideonsbergs IF (loan) | | |
| 2012–2018 | IK Sirius | 150 | (9) |
| 2019 | IF Brommapojkarna | 22 | (1) |
| 2020–2024 | Akropolis IF | 17 | (0) |
- * Club domestic league appearances and goals as of 18:29, 24 March 2021 (UTC)

Oscar Pehrsson (born 10 April 1988) is a Swedish footballer who last played for Akropolis IF.
