= Sebastian Larsson =

Swedish footballer (born 1985)

- Larsson as assistant coach for Sweden in 2026

Personal information
- Full name: Bengt Ulf Sebastian Larsson
- Date of birth: 6 June 1985 (age 41)
- Place of birth: Eskilstuna, Sweden
- Height: 1.78 m (5 ft 10 in)
- Position: Midfielder

Team information
- Current team: Sweden (assistant coach)

Youth career
- –2001: IFK Eskilstuna
- 2001–2004: Arsenal

Senior career*
Years	Team	Apps	(Gls)
2004–2007	Arsenal	3	(0)
2006–2007	→ Birmingham City (loan)	27	(1)
2007–2011	Birmingham City	157	(18)
2011–2017	Sunderland	176	(12)
2017–2018	Hull City	40	(2)
2018–2022	AIK	123	(21)
Total		526	(54)

International career
2000–2002	Sweden U17	23	(6)
2003	Sweden U19	9	(4)
2004–2006	Sweden U21	12	(0)
2008–2021	Sweden	133	(10)

Managerial career
- 2024–: Sweden (assistant)
- * Club domestic league appearances and goals

Bengt Ulf Sebastian Larsson (Swedish pronunciation: [ˈlɑ̌ːʂɔn]; born 6 June 1985) is a Swedish professional football coach and former player who is assistant coach of the Sweden national team. Renowned for being a set-piece specialist, Larsson played as a midfielder.

Beginning his career at hometown club IFK Eskilstuna, Larsson was signed by Arsenal. He made three Premier League appearances for the Gunners, before joining Birmingham City, initially on loan for the 2006–07 season, before a permanent transfer in the winter of 2007. Larsson spent five years at Birmingham, experiencing promotion to, and relegation from, the Premier League on two occasions. He joined Sunderland on 1 July 2011 upon the expiry of his contract, after Birmingham suffered relegation. He left Sunderland in 2017 to sign for Hull City in the EFL Championship where he spent one season. He returned to his native Sweden in 2018 to sign for AIK, and helped them win the 2018 Allsvenskan title before retiring in 2022.

A full international between 2008 and 2021, Larsson represented Sweden at the 2008, 2012, 2016 and 2020 editions of the UEFA European Championship, as well as the FIFA World Cup in 2018, at which he helped his country reach the quarter-finals. He amassed 133 caps for his country, scoring ten goals.

== Club career ==
=== Early career ===
Larsson was born in Eskilstuna and initially played football for his hometown team, IFK Eskilstuna. He joined Arsenal aged 16 during the summer of 2001, on a four-year professional contract.

=== Arsenal ===
Having been on the substitutes bench for a match against Panathinaikos, he made his first-team debut against Manchester City in the League Cup on 27 October 2004, where he played out of position at left back. He played in two further League Cup matches that season.

He made his Premier League debut on 1 February 2006, replacing Sol Campbell at half time as Arsenal lost 3–2 at home to West Ham United. Due to Campbell's defensive errors in that match, Larsson started the next two league matches in defence in his absence, a 2–0 win away to Birmingham City three days later, and a 1–1 draw at home to Bolton Wanderers on 11 February, in which he was substituted for Dennis Bergkamp as Arsenal sought their equaliser.

==== Loan to Birmingham City ====
Larsson joined Championship club Birmingham City on a season-long loan from Arsenal in August 2006, with an option to make the move permanent. Larsson made an immediate impact, scoring late winners in his first few games, against Crystal Palace and Shrewsbury Town. He also scored two goals against Newcastle United in the FA Cup.

=== Birmingham City ===
At the end of January 2007, Larsson signed permanently for Birmingham City on a four-year deal for a £1 million fee. He scored Birmingham's goal of the season, against Sheffield Wednesday in April 2007, running half the length of the field with the ball and finishing from inside the goal area.

In the 2006–07 season, Larsson was used mainly on the right wing, occasionally filling in at right-back or left-back when players were injured. His performances on the wide right of midfield in the 2007–08 season, in particular a man-of-the-match showing against Bolton Wanderers, indicated this to be his best position.

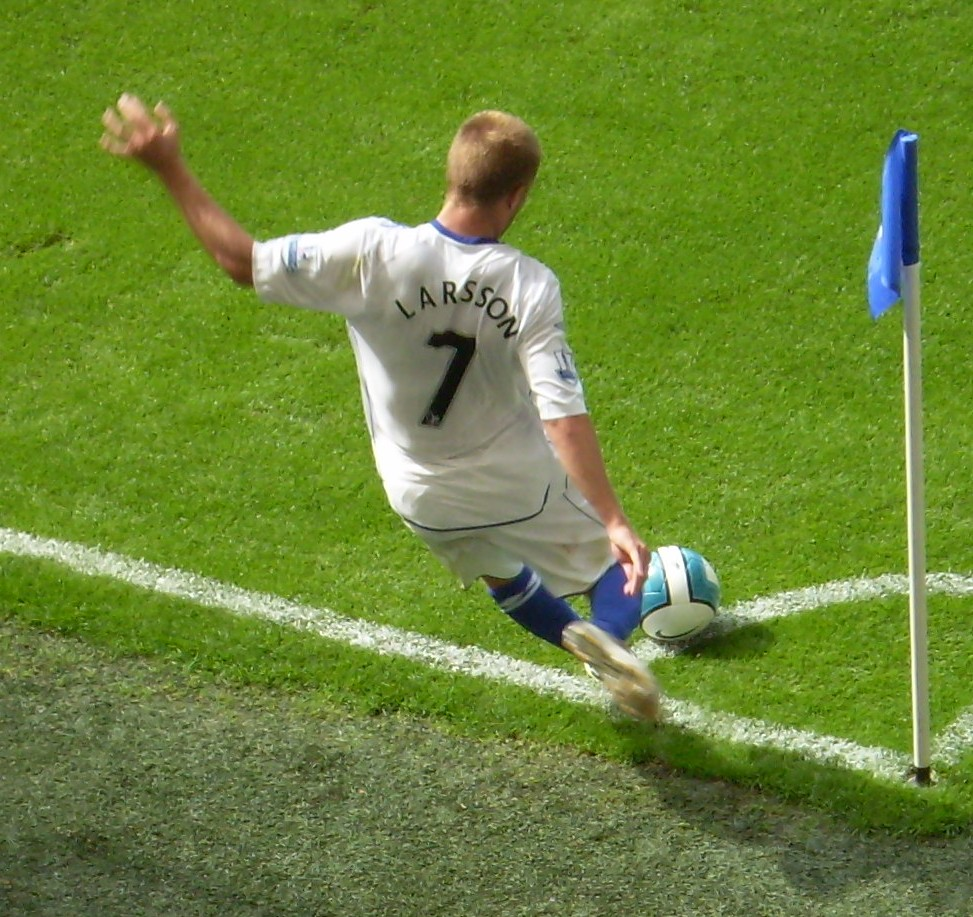
Larsson taking a corner for Birmingham City in 2007

Recalled to the starting eleven by new manager Alex McLeish for the game at Tottenham Hotspur in December 2007, Larsson scored a spectacular stoppage-time goal to give Birmingham their first away win in the Premier League for over three months. He scored half of his six goals that season with direct free kicks, two in consecutive games, against Tottenham and Portsmouth, and one from 30 yards (27 m) against Liverpool. With four weeks of the season remaining, Opta statistics rated Larsson as the most accurate taker of a direct free kick in the Premier League, though this ability failed to save Birmingham from relegation.

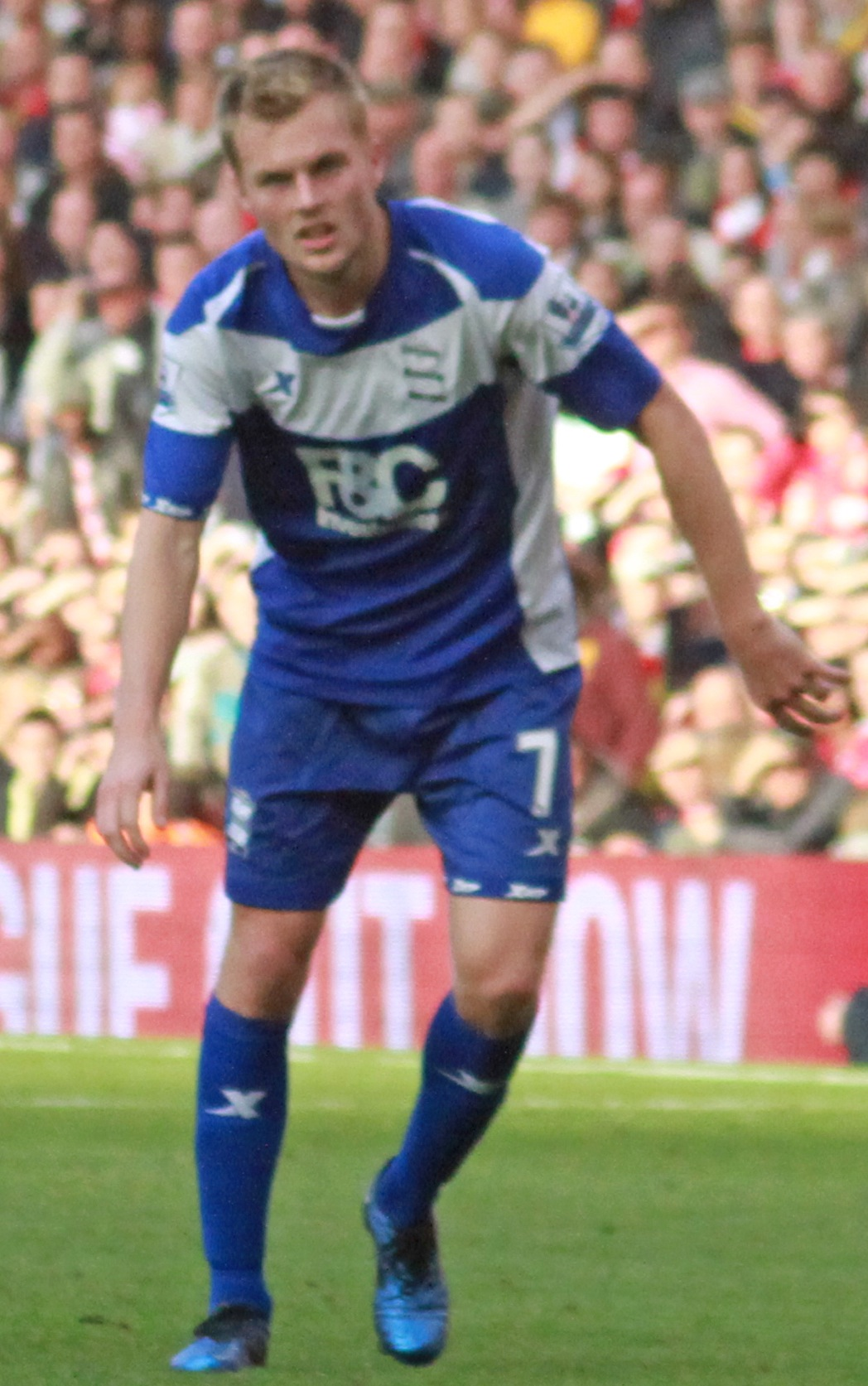
Larsson playing for Birmingham City in 2010

On the opening day of the 2010–11 season, Larsson recovered from what the Observer's reporter described as an "anonymous" start to provide assists for both Birmingham's goals as they drew 2–2 with Sunderland at the Stadium of Light. He again provided an assist, this time for Craig Gardner, in his side's first home game, a 2–1 win against Blackburn Rovers. Away to Fulham on 27 November, Alexander Hleb made "a terrific run" and a "slide-rule" pass to Larsson, who opened the scoring with his first goal of the season, a low shot across the goalkeeper. The game finished 1–1.

Larsson played his part in Birmingham's run to the 2011 League Cup Final. He scored from the penalty spot before Nikola Žigić headed an 84th-minute winner in the quarter-final against local rivals Aston Villa. In the first leg of the semi-final against West Ham United, Liam Ridgewell scored from Larsson's corner before Victor Obinna was sent off for kicking Larsson in the groin in an off-the-ball incident. Despite speculation over his future at Birmingham – with his contract due to expire at the end of the season, his advisor was given permission to talk to Newcastle United about a proposed move during the January transfer window, but personal terms were not agreed, and the player was booed when he came on as a substitute in the previous game, against Manchester United – Larsson returned to the starting eleven in place of the cup-tied David Bentley and played 100 minutes as Birmingham overturned a 2–1 deficit to win the semi-final 4–3 on aggregate. Roger Johnson flicked on Larsson's corner for Žigić to give his team an unexpected lead in the final at Wembley against firm favourites Arsenal. Though Robin van Persie equalised, Obafemi Martins scored an 89th-minute winner to give Birmingham their first trophy since 1963.

Larsson took advantage of a defensive mix-up to open the scoring as Birmingham beat Sunderland 2–0 at St Andrew's on 16 April, and four days later, marked his 200th appearance for the club in all competitions with a penalty, albeit in a losing cause, against reigning champions Chelsea. On 1 May, he exploited Michael Mancienne's mistake to score the equalising goal against Wolverhampton Wanderers, helping his side earn a point despite playing with ten men for more than an hour after Gardner was sent off. No new contract was agreed, and following relegation to the Championship, the club confirmed that Larsson was to leave at the end of the season when his existing deal expired.

=== Sunderland ===
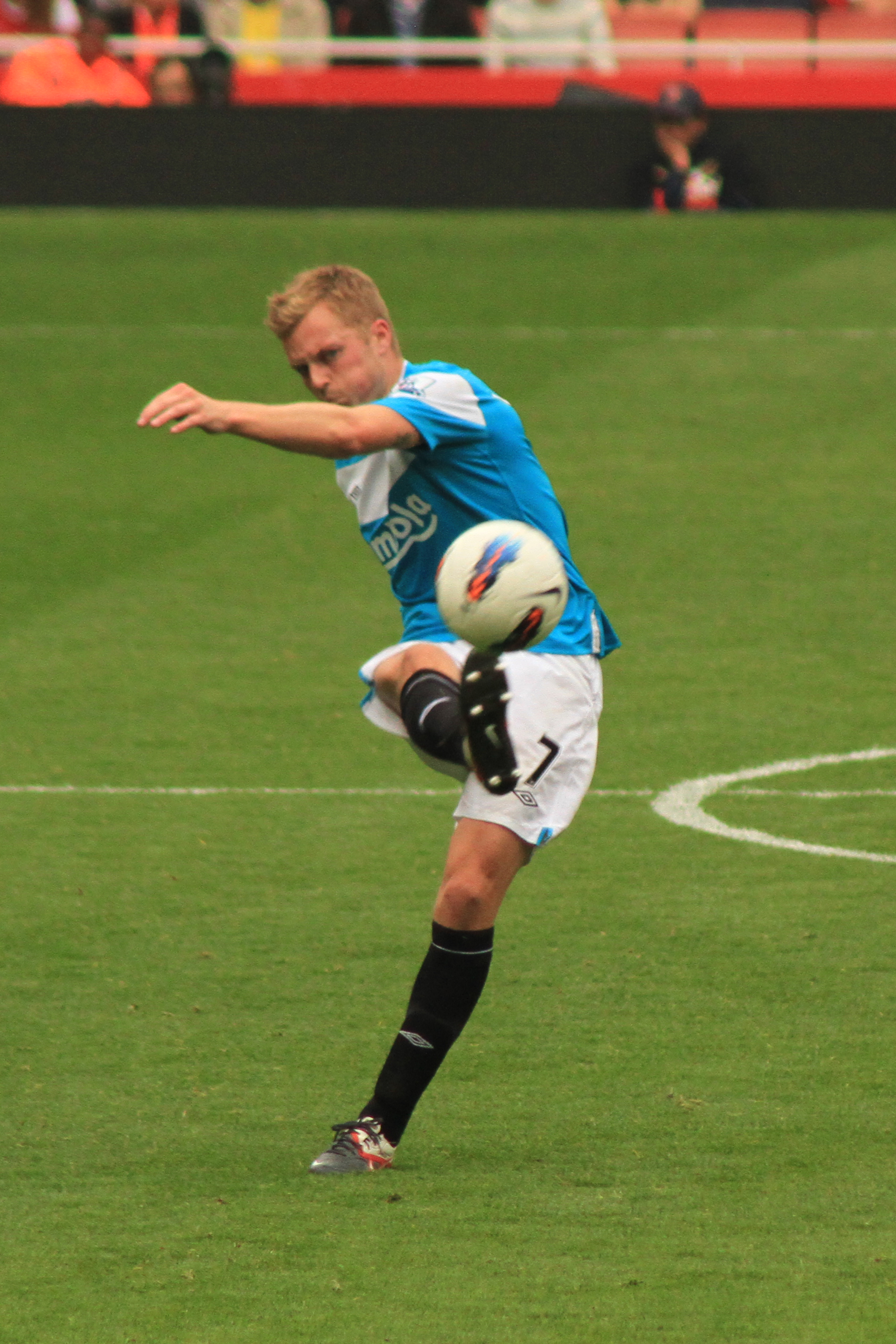
Larsson taking a free-kick for Sunderland in 2011

On 22 June 2011, Sunderland confirmed that Larsson would join the club on a free transfer under the Bosman ruling on 1 July, thus linking him up with former Birmingham manager Steve Bruce. He was given squad number 7 for the 2011–12 season. He marked his debut with the second-half equaliser in a 1–1 draw on the opening day of the season against Liverpool at Anfield, when given room at the far post to produce a "superb first-time angled volley." His second Sunderland goal, direct from a free kick, put his team 4–0 up against Stoke City at the Stadium of Light in their first win of the season. Larsson scored directly from another free-kick against Arsenal at the Emirates Stadium a month later, prompting Arsenal manager Arsène Wenger to label his former player "maybe the best in the league as a free-kick-taker."

He scored the opening goal in Sunderland's 2–1 home defeat by Wigan Athletic on 26 November, which proved to be Bruce's last game in charge of the Black Cats. Sunderland visited Wolves the following week under caretaker manager Eric Black. With Sunderland 1–0 up, Larsson won a penalty, although replays suggested he dived. His penalty was saved by Wayne Hennessey; less than 30 seconds later, Steven Fletcher equalised for Wolves, and went on to add a late winner. Larsson made amends in the following game, scoring from a free kick against Blackburn Rovers in injury-time to secure a late 2–1 win in Martin O'Neill's first game as manager. Larsson scored another free kick on 8 January in the FA Cup in a 2–0 win against Peterborough United at London Road. In the fifth round tie with Arsenal, a quick counterattack from Sunderland saw Larsson hit the woodwork, and the ball subsequently hit Alex Oxlade-Chamberlain to put Sunderland 2–0 up and into the quarter-finals. Larsson scored twice as Sunderland drew 3–3 with Manchester City at the Etihad Stadium on 31 March.

Larsson produced a "25-yard thunderbolt" as his first goal of the 2012–13 Premier League season against West Ham United on 12 January 2013 in a 3–0 win. He provided the assist for Stéphane Sessègnon's goal in Sunderland's 1–0 defeat of Everton on 20 April, pushing the club clear of the relegation zone. The strike against West Ham proved to be Larsson's only goal of the campaign, a season in which was underwhelming on both individual and club levels as Sunderland barely managed to avoid relegation.

His first goal of the 2013–14 season came on 6 November 2013, in a 2–1 win against Southampton in the League Cup. His first league goal of the season came against Manchester United on 3 May 2014, where he scored the only goal of the game. The result gave Sunderland their first win at Old Trafford since 1968. After contributing to Sunderland's escape from relegation, he was given a new contract to run until 2017.

On 16 August 2014, Larsson scored a late equaliser for Sunderland in their 2–2 draw with West Bromwich Albion on the opening day of the 2014–15 Premier League season. His second goal of the season was a free kick to open the scoring in a 1–1 draw with Everton on 9 November, and his third, another direct free kick, came in a 2–1 loss at Tottenham on 17 December. Larsson was named Sunderland's Supporters' Player of the Year for the 2014–15 season.

=== Hull City ===
After being released by Sunderland when their relegation from the Premier League coincided with the expiry of his contract, Larsson signed a one-year contract with Championship club Hull City on 9 August 2017. He made his first appearance for the club when he came off the bench as a 74th-minute substitute for Kamil Grosicki in the 4–1 home win against Burton Albion on 12 August 2017. On 30 September 2017, he scored his first goal for Hull City, when he scored the 6th goal in a 6–1 home victory over Birmingham City.

He was offered a new contract by Hull at the end of the 2017–18 season.

=== AIK ===
On 11 June 2018, Larsson signed for Allsvenskan club AIK. His first season with AIK was very successful, as he helped the team win the Swedish Championship for the twelfth time in the club's history after claiming the 2018 Allsvenskan title. Larsson retired after the 2022 season.

== International career ==
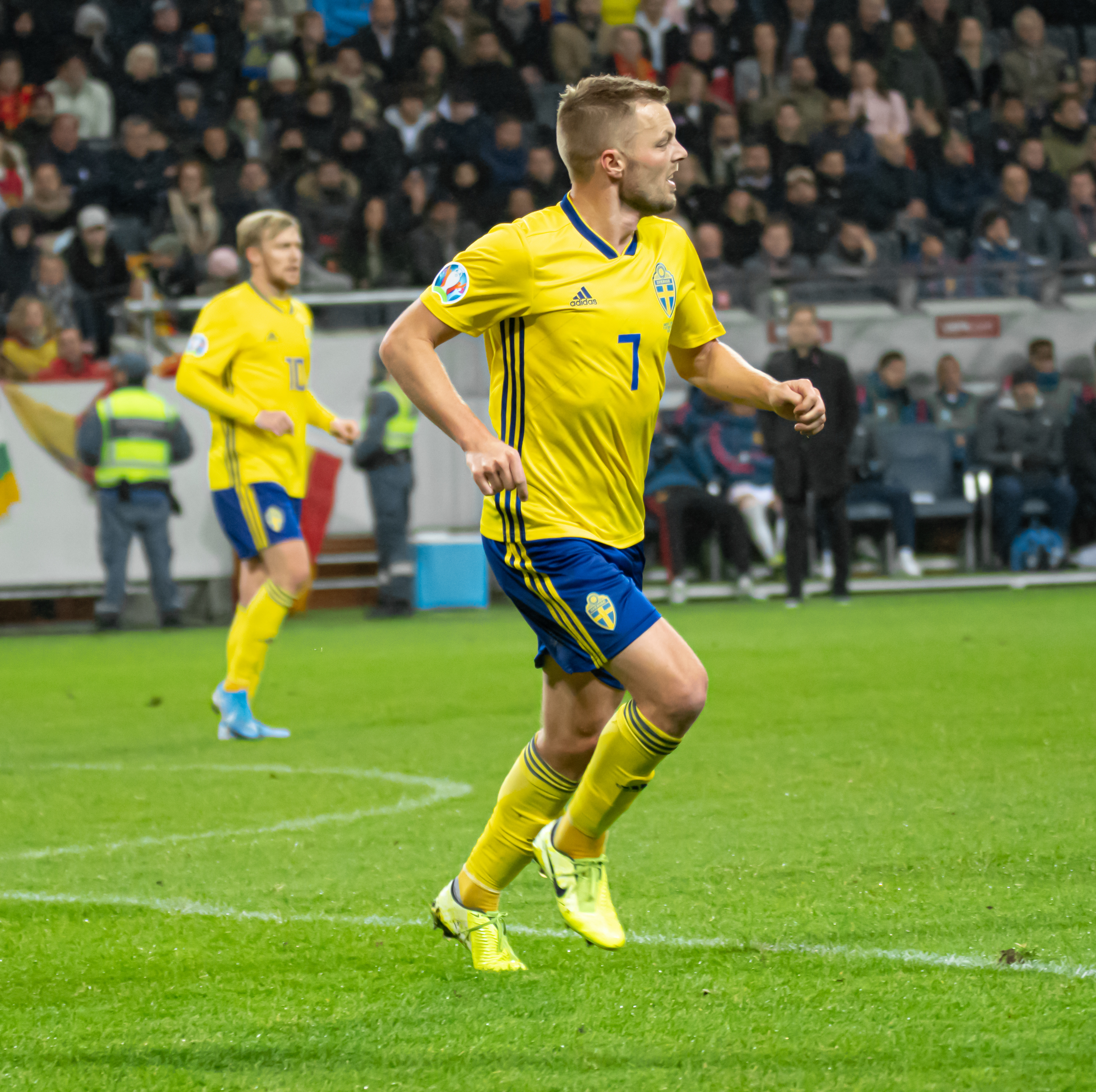
Larsson playing for Sweden against Spain in 2019

Larsson received his first call-up to the Sweden squad for the UEFA Euro 2008 qualifying games against Liechtenstein and Northern Ireland in October 2007. He was an unused substitute against Liechtenstein but did not make the bench for the Northern Ireland game. He made his debut for Sweden in February 2008, playing the whole 90 minutes of a friendly draw against Turkey in Istanbul. He was named in Sweden's 23-man squad for UEFA Euro 2008, and has since become a regular in the national team.

He scored his first goal at senior international level in March 2011 as Sweden beat Moldova 2–1 in a Euro 2012 qualifier. During the qualifiers in October, Larsson added two more goals to his international tally. The first was the opener in a 2–1 away victory over Finland in Helsinki, and the second was a penalty as Sweden came from behind to beat the Netherlands 3–2 on 11 October at the Råsunda Stadium in Stockholm. In February 2012, Larsson scored two second-half goals to down Croatia 3–1 at the Maksimir Stadium in Zagreb.

Larsson was selected in Sweden's squad for Euro 2012. He started all three of their group games and scored the second goal in their 2–0 win over France, but Sweden did not make it through to the knockout stages of the competition.

On 15 October 2013, Larsson registered 2 assists in their 3–5 loss against Germany in a World Cup Qualification game. He was captain during the game.

Larsson was named in Sweden's 23-man squad for the 2018 FIFA World Cup in Russia. In the last warm-up match before the tournament, a goalless draw with Peru on 9 June, he made his 100th senior appearance for his country. At the 2018 World Cup, Larsson played in four games for Sweden as they were eliminated by England in the quarter-finals. He got his ninth international goal on 28 March 2021, scoring from the penalty spot in a 3–0 World Cup qualifying win over Kosovo.

Larsson started in all four matches of Sweden at Euro 2020, serving as captain in the absence of Andreas Granqvist. Following the tournament, he announced his retirement from international football.

== Personal life ==
Larsson lives in Eskilstuna with his wife Tina. As of June 2018, the couple have two daughters. His father, Svante Larsson, is a former football player and coach, who briefly played for IFK Eskilstuna (1976–1977).

== Career statistics ==
=== Club ===
Appearances and goals by club, season and competition
Club	Season	League			National cup (Note: Includes FA Cup, Svenska Cupen)		League cup (Note: Includes Football League/EFL Cup)		Europe		Other		Total	
Club	Season	Division	Apps	Goals	Apps	Goals	Apps	Goals	Apps	Goals	Apps	Goals	Apps	Goals
Arsenal	2004–05	Premier League	0	0	0	0	3	0	0	0	0	0	3	0
Arsenal	2005–06	Premier League	3	0	1	0	4	0	1 (Note: Appearance in UEFA Champions League)	0	0	0	9	0
Arsenal	Total		3	0	1	0	7	0	1	0	0	0	12	0
Birmingham City	2006–07	Championship	43	4	3	3	4	2	—		—		50	9
Birmingham City	2007–08	Premier League	35	6	1	0	1	0	—		—		37	6
Birmingham City	2008–09	Championship	38	1	0	0	1	0	—		—		39	1
Birmingham City	2009–10	Premier League	33	4	4	0	1	0	—		—		38	4
Birmingham City	2010–11	Premier League	35	4	1	0	5	1	—		—		41	5
Birmingham City	Total		184	19	9	3	12	3	—		—		205	25
Sunderland	2011–12	Premier League	32	7	6	1	1	0	—		—		39	8
Sunderland	2012–13	Premier League	38	1	2	0	1	0	—		—		41	1
Sunderland	2013–14	Premier League	31	1	4	0	6	1	—		—		41	2
Sunderland	2014–15	Premier League	36	3	3	0	1	0	—		—		40	3
Sunderland	2015–16	Premier League	18	0	0	0	1	0	—		—		19	0
Sunderland	2016–17	Premier League	21	0	2	0	0	0	—		—		23	0
Sunderland	Total		176	12	17	1	10	1	—		—		203	14
Sunderland U23	2016–17	—			—		—		—		1 (Note: Appearance in EFL Trophy)	0	1	0
Hull City	2017–18	Championship	40	2	0	0	0	0	—		—		40	2
AIK	2018	Allsvenskan	15	2	1	0	—		2 (Note: Appearances in UEFA Europa League)	0	—		18	2
AIK	2019	Allsvenskan	28	6	6	2	—		8 (Note: Four appearances and two goals in UEFA Champions League, four appearances and one goal in UEFA Europa League)	3	—		42	11
AIK	2020	Allsvenskan	28	5	5	0	—		—		—		33	5
AIK	2021	Allsvenskan	25	3	3	3	—		—		—		10	4
AIK	2022	Allsvenskan	27	5	5	2	—		6 (Note: Appearances in UEFA Conference League)	1	—		38	8
AIK	Total		123	21	20	7	—		16	4	—		159	32
Career total			526	54	47	11	29	4	17	4	1	0	620	73

=== International ===
Appearances and goals by national team and year
National team	Year	Apps	Goals
Sweden	2008	9	0
Sweden	2009	10	0
Sweden	2010	8	0
Sweden	2011	11	3
Sweden	2012	12	3
Sweden	2013	12	0
Sweden	2014	8	0
Sweden	2015	10	0
Sweden	2016	7	0
Sweden	2017	9	0
Sweden	2018	13	0
Sweden	2019	9	2
Sweden	2020	7	0
Sweden	2021	8	2
Total		133	10

Sweden score listed first, score column indicates score after each Larsson goal.

International goals by date, venue, cap, opponent, score, result and competition
No.	Date	Venue	Cap	Opponent	Score	Result	Competition	Ref.
1	28 March 2011	Råsunda Stadium, Solna, Sweden	29	Moldova	2–0	2–1	UEFA Euro 2012 qualifying	
2	7 October 2011	Helsinki Olympic Stadium, Helsinki, Finland	35	Finland	1–0	2–1	UEFA Euro 2012 qualifying	
3	11 October 2011	Råsunda Stadium, Solna, Sweden	36	Netherlands	2–2	3–2	UEFA Euro 2012 qualifying	
4	29 February 2012	Stadion Maksimir, Zagreb, Croatia	39	Croatia	2–1	3–1	Friendly	
5	29 February 2012	Stadion Maksimir, Zagreb, Croatia	39	Croatia	3–1	3–1	Friendly	
6	19 June 2012	Olimpiyskiy National Sports Complex, Kyiv, Ukraine	44	France	2–0	2–0	UEFA Euro 2012	
7	12 October 2019	National Stadium, Ta' Qali, Malta	116	Malta	2–0	4–0	UEFA Euro 2020 qualifying	
8	12 October 2019	National Stadium, Ta' Qali, Malta	116	Malta	4–0	4–0	UEFA Euro 2020 qualifying	
9	28 March 2021	Fadil Vokrri Stadium, Pristina, Kosovo	127	Kosovo	3–0	3–0	2022 FIFA World Cup qualification	
10	29 May 2021	Friends Arena, Solna, Sweden	128	Finland	2–0	2–0	Friendly	

== Honours ==
Birmingham City

- Football League Cup: 2010–11
- Football League Championship runner-up: 2006–07, 2008–09

Sunderland

- Football League Cup runner-up: 2013–14

AIK

- Allsvenskan: 2018

Individual

- Birmingham City Player of the Year: 2007–08
- Birmingham City Players' Player of the Year: 2007–08
- Birmingham City Goal of the Season: 2007–08
- Sunderland Supporters' Player of the Year: 2014–15

== See also ==
- List of footballers with 100 or more caps
