= Knud Engedal =

Danish footballer (born 1942)

Personal information
- Full name: Knud Erik Engedal
- Date of birth: 18 March 1942 (age 84)
- Place of birth: Sønderborg, Denmark
- Position: Goalkeeper

Senior career*
Years	Team	Apps	(Gls)
1972–1978	B 1913		
1972–1978	Västerås SK		
1978–1982	Kolding IF		

International career
1964	Denmark U21	2	(0)
1965–1966	Denmark B	3	(0)
1968–1969	Denmark	17	(0)
- * Club domestic league appearances and goals

Knud Erik Engedal (born 18 March 1942) is a Danish former footballer who played as a goalkeeper. He made 17 appearances for the Denmark national team from 1968 to 1969.
