= 2026 IFK Göteborg season =

IFK Göteborg
2026 season
- Chairman: Magnus Nilsson
- Head coach: Stefan Billborn (until 27 July); Joachim Björklund (from 27 July)
- Stadium: Gamla Ullevi
- Allsvenskan: 10th
- 2025–26 Svenska Cupen: Quarter-finals
- 2026–27 UEFA Conference League: Third qualifying round
- Top goalscorer: League: Sam Larsson (8); All: Tobias Heintz; Sam Larsson (8)
- Highest home attendance: 18,084 vs. GAIS (26 April 2026, Allsvenskan)
- Lowest home attendance: 5,507 vs. Östersunds FK (21 February 2026, Svenska Cupen); Allsvenskan: 15,486 vs. IF Brommapojkarna (17 July 2026)
- Average home league attendance: 16,455
- Biggest win: 4–0 vs. Trelleborgs FF (28 February 2026, Svenska Cupen)
- Biggest defeat: 0–6 vs. Djurgårdens IF (4 May 2026, Allsvenskan)
Home colours	Away colours

The 2026 season is IFK Göteborg's 121st in existence, their 94th season in Allsvenskan and their 50th consecutive season in the league. They compete in Allsvenskan, Svenska Cupen and in qualification for the UEFA Conference League. League play started on 6 April and will end on 29 November.

August Erlingmark was appointed new captain, following the retirement of Gustav Svensson.

== Players ==
=== Squad information ===
N	Pos.	Nat.	Name	Age	Since	App	Goals	Ends	Transfer fee	Notes
1	GK	(Norway)	Jonathan Rasheed	34	2026	0	0	2026	Free	
3	DF	(Sweden)	August Erlingmark (captain)	28	2024	177	9	2028	Free	
4	MF	(Sweden)	Kevin Ackermann	25	2026	9	0	2028	Free	
5	DF	(Denmark)	Jonas Bager	30	2024	44	0	2027	Free	
6	DF	(Iceland)	Hjörtur Hermannsson	31	2026	20	1	2028	Free	
7	FW	(Denmark)	Alexander Simmelhack	21	2026	9	3	2030 (June)	~ 7.0M SEK	
8	FW	(Sweden)	Sam Larsson (3rd captain)	33	2026	64	14	2028	Free	
9	FW	(Denmark)	Max Fenger	25	2025	47	12	2027	~ 2.0M SEK	
10	MF	(Sweden)	Ramon Pascal Lundqvist	29	2024	28	3	2027	~ 3.4M SEK	
11	FW	(Slovenia)	Nino Žugelj	26	2026	8	3	2027 (June)	Free	On loan from Djurgårdens IF
12	GK	(Sweden)	Viktor Andersson	22	2026	15	0	2026	Free	On loan from IFK Värnamo
14	FW	(Norway)	Tobias Heintz (vice-captain)	28	2025	56	14	2027	Free	
15	MF	(Denmark)	David Kruse	24	2024	67	4	2028	Undisclosed	
16	MF	(Sweden)	Filip Ottosson	30	2026	14	1	2029	Free	On loan to Lillestrøm SK
17	DF	(Sweden)	Alexander Jallow	28	2026	88	2	2027	Free	
18	DF	(Sweden)	Felix Eriksson	22	2022	48	2	2028	Youth system	
19	FW	(Albania)	Arbnor Muçolli	27	2023	30	8	2026	Free	
20	DF	(Sweden)	Gabriel Ersoy	21	2026	0	0	2028	Undisclosed	
21	MF	(Sweden)	Leo Radaković	19	2025	3	0	2028	Youth system	
22	DF	(Sweden)	Noah Tolf	21	2024	51	2	2029 (June)	Youth system	
23	MF	(Iceland)	Kolbeinn Þórðarson	26	2023	80	11	2028	Free	
24	MF	(Sweden)	Oliver Månsson	17	2026	17	0	2028	Youth system	
25	GK	(Sweden)	Elis Bishesari	21	2024	52	0	2027	Youth system	
26	DF	(Sweden)	Emil Fasth	18	2026	4	0	2030 (June)	Youth system	
27	FW	(Sweden)	Alfons Borén	20	2025	9	1	2028	Youth system	
28	DF	(Ghana)	Issaka Seidu	20	2026	7	0	2027 (June)	Free	On loan from FC Nordsjælland
29	FW	(Sweden)	Adam Bergmark Wiberg	29	2026	19	1	2029 (June)	Free	
30	FW	(Canada)	Tiago Coimbra	22	2026	7	0	2029 (June)	~ 2.7M SEK	
	MF	(Sweden)	Imam Jagne	23	2025	30	1	2028	~ 4.9M SEK	On loan to A.E. Kifisia

- Last updated: 8 November 2026
- Source: IFK Göteborg and players' Wikipedia articles
- Ordered by squad number.

=== Transfers ===
==== In ====
Date	Pos.	Player	From	Type	Fee	Ref.
10 September 2025	MF	(Sweden) Filip Ottosson	(Norway) Sandefjord	Free transfer		
27 November 2025	MF	(Sweden) Leo Radaković	Academy			
18 December 2025	DF	(Sweden) Alexander Jallow		Free transfer		
19 December 2025	DF	(Sweden) Gabriel Ersoy	(Sweden) Vasalunds IF	Transfer	Undisclosed	
19 January 2026	GK	(Norway) Jonathan Rasheed	(Iceland) KA	Free transfer		
31 January 2026	FW	(Canada) Tiago Coimbra	(Canada) HFX Wanderers	Transfer	~ 2.7M SEK	
17 February 2026	GK	(Sweden) Viktor Andersson	(Sweden) IFK Värnamo	Loan		
25 February 2026	FW	(Sweden) Adam Bergmark Wiberg	(South Korea) Chungnam Asan	Free transfer		
14 March 2026	GK	(Sweden) Fredrik Andersson	(Sweden) Varbergs BoIS	Free transfer		
24 March 2026	MF	(Sweden) Oliver Månsson	Academy			
8 July 2026	DF	(Ghana) Issaka Seidu	(Denmark) FC Nordsjælland	Loan		
14 July 2026	FW	(Sweden) Sam Larsson	(Turkey) Fatih Karagümrük	Free transfer		
14 July 2026	DF	(Iceland) Hjörtur Hermannsson	(Greece) Volos	Free transfer		
18 August 2026	DF	(Sweden) Emil Fasth	Academy			
28 August 2026	FW	(Slovenia) Nino Žugelj	(Sweden) Djurgårdens IF	Loan		
31 August 2026	FW	(Denmark) Alexander Simmelhack	(Denmark) Silkeborg IF	Transfer	~ 7.0M SEK	
31 August 2026	MF	(Sweden) Kevin Ackermann	(Sweden) IF Brommapojkarna	Free transfer		

==== Out ====
Date	Pos.	Player	To	Type	Fee	Ref.
31 October 2025	DF	(Sweden) Gustav Svensson	Retirement			
2 December 2025	FW	(Sweden) Linus Carlstrand	(Sweden) Östers IF	Transfer	~ 2.7M SEK	
22 December 2025	GK	(Sweden) Pontus Dahlberg	(Norway) Lillestrøm SK	Transfer	~ 2.7M SEK	
9 February 2026	DF	(Norway) Anders Trondsen	(Norway) HamKam	Free transfer		
17 February 2026	DF	(Denmark) Thomas Santos	(Poland) Motor Lublin	Transfer	~ 1.4M SEK	
19 February 2026	MF	(Ivory Coast) Abundance Salaou	(Canada) Toronto FC II	Transfer	Undisclosed	
30 June 2026	MF	(Sweden) Lucas Kåhed	(Sweden) Varbergs BoIS	Free transfer		
30 June 2026	GK	(Sweden) Fredrik Andersson		Free transfer		
4 July 2026	MF	(Sweden) Benjamin Brantlind	(France) Strasbourg	Transfer	~ 20.0M SEK	
16 July 2026	MF	(Sweden) Imam Jagne	(Greece) A.E. Kifisia	Loan		
12 August 2026	DF	(Ghana) Rockson Yeboah	(Spain) Osasuna	Transfer	~ 33.1M SEK	
14 August 2026	FW	(Cameroon) Saidou Alioum	(Czech Republic) Jablonec	Transfer	~ 8.8M SEK	
1 September 2026	MF	(Sweden) Filip Ottosson	(Norway) Lillestrøm SK	Loan		
3 September 2026	FW	(Togo) Sebastian Clemmensen	(Portugal) Rio Ave	Transfer	~ 15.6M SEK	

== Club ==
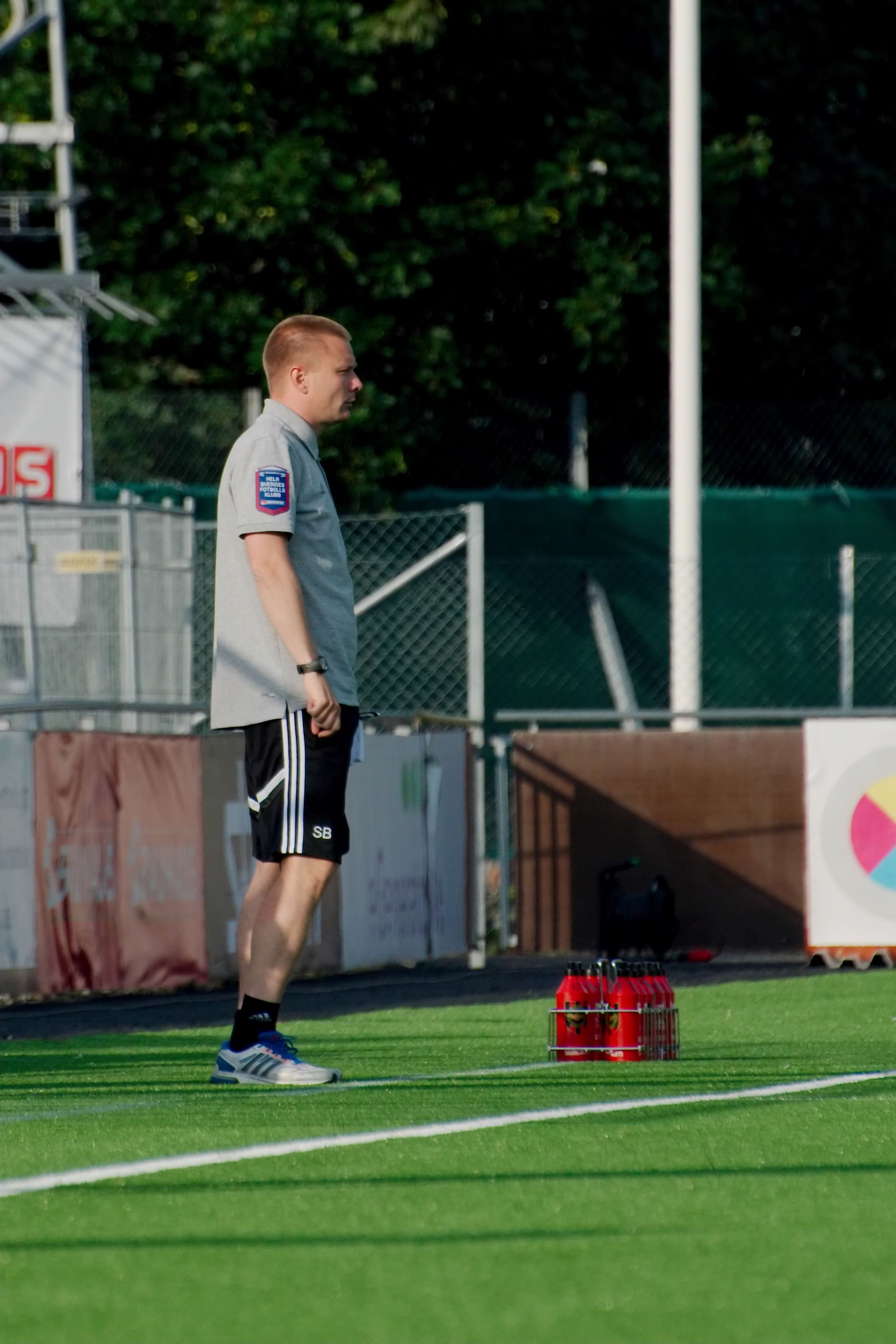
The 2026 season was Stefan Billborn's third and final season at IFK Göteborg.

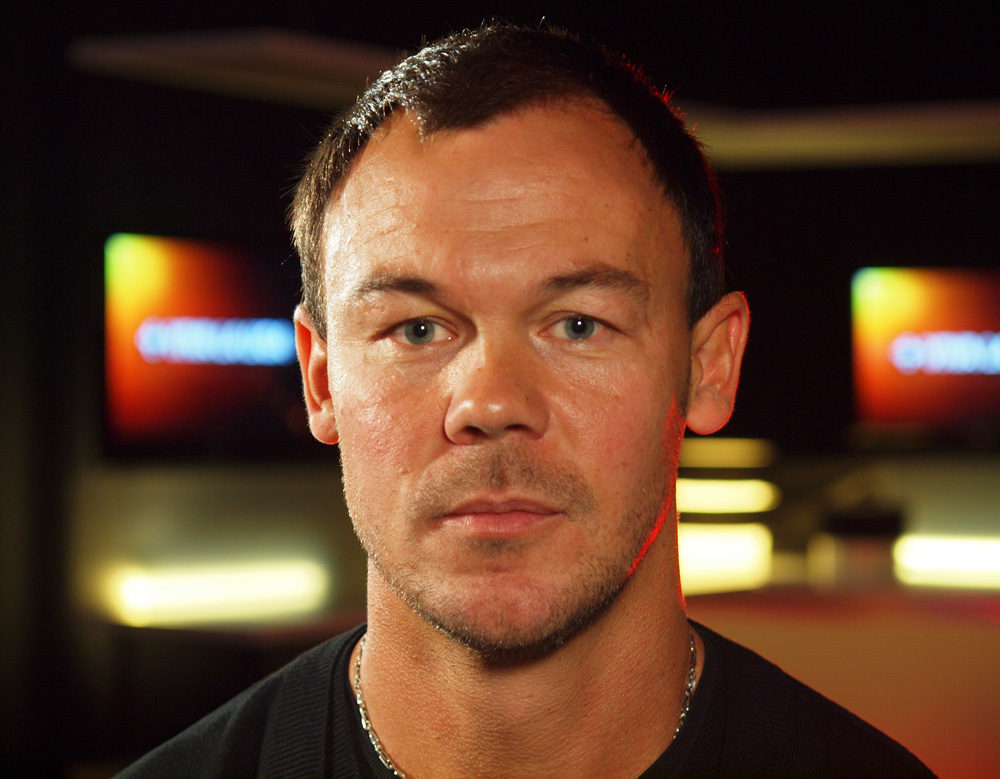
The 2026 season is Joachim Björklund's first season at IFK Göteborg as head coach.

=== Coaching staff ===
Role	Name
Head coach	(Sweden) Joachim Björklund
Assistant coaches	(Sweden) Marcus Berg
Assistant coaches	(Sweden) Oscar Wendt
Goalkeeping coach	(Scotland) Lee Baxter
Analyst	(Sweden) Liam Wohlén
Scout	(Sweden) David Vuković
Sports coordinator	(Sweden) Samuel Yngvesson
Strength and conditioning coach	(England) Hakeem Araba
Physiotherapist	(Sweden) Kaj Leuther
Equipment managers	(Sweden) Eva Qvistgaard
Equipment managers	(Sweden) Rolf Gustavsson

=== Other information ===
Chairman	(Sweden) Magnus Nilsson
Club director	(Sweden) Nicklas Lauwell
Head of football	(Sweden) Jesper Jansson
Technical manager	(Sweden) Magnus Edlund
Ground (capacity and dimensions)	Gamla Ullevi (18,454 / 105x68 m)

Source: IFK Göteborg and Gamla Ullevi

== Competitions ==
=== Overall ===
Competition	Started round	Current position / round	Final position / round	First match	Last match
Allsvenskan	Matchday 1	10th		6 April 2026	29 November 2026
2025–26 Svenska Cupen	Round 2	—	Quarter-finals	20 August 2025	15 March 2026
2026–27 UEFA Conference League	Second qualifying round	—	Third qualifying round	21 July 2026	13 August 2026

Updated to match played 8 November 2026
Source: Competitions

=== Allsvenskan ===
==== League table ====
Pos	Team	Pld	W	D	L	GF	GA	GD	Pts
8	AIK	28	11	8	9	46	49	−3	41
9	GAIS	28	11	7	10	36	28	+8	40
10	IFK Göteborg	28	10	9	9	36	46	−10	39
11	IF Brommapojkarna	28	9	8	11	39	44	−5	35
12	Mjällby AIF	28	6	10	12	30	43	−13	28

Updated to match(es) played on 8 November 2026. Source: svenskfotboll.se (in Swedish)
Rules for classification: 1) Points; 2) Goal difference; 3) Goals scored; 4) Head-to-head points; 5) Head-to-head goal difference; 6) Head-to-head away goals scored; 7) Play-off
(Note: Play-off is only played if need to decide champion, teams for relegation or UEFA competition and will be played on a neutral ground).

==== Results summary ====
Overall								Home						Away					
Pld	W	D	L	GF	GA	GD	Pts	W	D	L	GF	GA	GD	W	D	L	GF	GA	GD
28	10	9	9	36	46	−10	39	6	5	3	17	14	+3	4	4	6	19	32	−13

Last updated: 8 November 2026.
Source: svenskfotboll.se (in Swedish)

==== Results by round ====
Round	1	2	3	4	5	6	7	8	9	10	11	12	13	14	15	16	17	18	19	20	21	22	23	24	25	26	27	28	29	30
Ground	A	H	A	A	H	A	H	A	H	A	H	A	H	A	H	H	A	H	H	A	H	A	H	A	A	H	A	H	A	H
Result	L	L	D	D	D	L	L	W	D	W	L	L	W	L	W	W	L	D	W	W	W	W	W	D	D	D	L	D		
Position	14	15	14	14	14	15	15	14	14	14	14	14	13	13	13	10	12	12	11	11	9	9	8	8	9	9	9	10		

Updated to match(es) played on 8 November 2026. Source: see below
A = Away; H = Home; W = Win; D = Draw; L = Loss

==== Matches ====
Kickoff times are in UTC+2 unless stated otherwise.

6 April 2026 Round 1	IF Elfsborg	2–0	IFK Göteborg	Borås
14:00	Silverholt 59'; Magnússon 65'	Report		Stadium: Borås Arena; Attendance: 14,344; Referee: Victor Wolf

11 April 2026 Round 2	IFK Göteborg	0–2	BK Häcken	Gothenburg
15:00		Report	Lindgren 17'; Rygaard 84'	Stadium: Gamla Ullevi; Attendance: 17,457; Referee: Joakim Sars

18 April 2026 Round 3	Halmstads BK	1–1	IFK Göteborg	Halmstad
15:00	Faraj 62'	Report	Heintz 64'	Stadium: Örjans Vall; Attendance: 8,644; Referee: Oscar Johnson

23 April 2026 Round 4	Kalmar FF	1–1	IFK Göteborg	Kalmar
19:00	Rosenqvist 29'	Report	Heintz 45+1'	Stadium: Guldfågeln Arena; Attendance: 4,896; Referee: Adam Ladebäck

26 April 2026 Round 5	IFK Göteborg	2–2	GAIS	Gothenburg
16:30	Yeboah 25'; Kruse 72'	Report	Andersson 63'; Milovanovic 69'	Stadium: Gamla Ullevi; Attendance: 18,084; Referee: Fredrik Klitte

4 May 2026 Round 6	Djurgårdens IF	6–0	IFK Göteborg	Stockholm
19:00	Okkels 15'; Åslund 31', 62'; Lien 34'; Asoro 81', 90'	Report		Stadium: 3Arena; Attendance: 20,415; Referee: Kristoffer Karlsson

9 May 2026 Round 7	IFK Göteborg	0–1	Hammarby IF	Gothenburg
15:00		Report	Eriksson 90+3'	Stadium: Gamla Ullevi; Attendance: 16,281; Referee: Victor Wolf

18 May 2026 Round 8	Örgryte IS	2–3	IFK Göteborg	Gothenburg
19:00	Hofvander 37'; Paulson 87'	Report	Erlingmark 21'; Brantlind 28'; Eriksson 90'	Stadium: Gamla Ullevi; Attendance: 17,119; Referee: Glenn Nyberg
Note: Match abandoned in the 40th minute after repeated incidents in the stands. The remainder of the match was played behind closed doors the following day, 19 May, at 15:00.

25 May 2026 Round 9	IFK Göteborg	1–1	Mjällby AIF	Gothenburg
19:00	Clemmensen 51'	Report	Bergström 58' (pen.)	Stadium: Gamla Ullevi; Attendance: 16,653; Referee: Oscar Johnson

31 May 2026 Round 10	Västerås SK	4–5	IFK Göteborg	Västerås
14:00	Gunnarsson 27'; Ladefoged 30'; Taonsa 53', 66'	Report	Heintz 1', 8', 37', 79'; Bergmark Wiberg 9'	Stadium: Hitachi Energy Arena; Attendance: 7,656; Referee: Granit Maqedonci

5 July 2026 Round 11	IFK Göteborg	1–2	AIK	Gothenburg
14:00	Clemmensen 30'	Report	Hove 34'; Kouame 76'	Stadium: Gamla Ullevi; Attendance: 16,598; Referee: Kristoffer Karlsson

12 July 2026 Round 12	Malmö FF	4–0	IFK Göteborg	Malmö
14:00	Đurić 8'; Botheim 23', 45+2'; Höög 48'	Report		Stadium: Stadion; Attendance: 19,674; Referee: Granit Maqedonci

17 July 2026 Round 13	IFK Göteborg	2–1	IF Brommapojkarna	Gothenburg
19:00	Yeboah 54'; Clemmensen 79'	Report	Berg 67'	Stadium: Gamla Ullevi; Attendance: 15,486; Referee: Adam Ladebäck

26 July 2026 Round 14	IK Sirius	4–1	IFK Göteborg	Uppsala
14:00	Soumah 6'; Ure 23'; Lindberg 71'; Ljungberg 83'	Report	Larsson 45' (pen.)	Stadium: Studenternas IP; Attendance: 9,761; Referee: Oscar Johnson

2 August 2026 Round 15	IFK Göteborg	2–0	Degerfors IF	Gothenburg
14:00	Larsson 25' (pen.); Ottosson 90+4'	Report		Stadium: Gamla Ullevi; Attendance: 15,985; Referee: Joakim Sars

9 August 2026 Round 16	IFK Göteborg	3–2	Kalmar FF	Gothenburg
16:30	Kruse 13'; Larsson 77' (pen.); Borén 81'	Report	Rosenqvist 9'; Sagoe 84'	Stadium: Gamla Ullevi; Attendance: 16,251; Referee: Erik Mattsson

16 August 2026 Round 17	Degerfors IF	3–0	IFK Göteborg	Degerfors
14:00	Vukojević 18', 25'; Diatara 30'	Report		Stadium: Stora Valla; Attendance: 5,723; Referee: Kristoffer Karlsson

23 August 2026 Round 18	IFK Göteborg	1–1	IF Elfsborg	Gothenburg
14:00	Larsson 63' (pen.)	Report	Östman 90'	Stadium: Gamla Ullevi; Attendance: 15,823; Referee: Mohammed Al-Hakim

30 August 2026 Round 19	IFK Göteborg	1–0	Örgryte IS	Gothenburg
16:30	Hermannsson 61'	Report		Stadium: Gamla Ullevi; Attendance: 16,804; Referee: Adam Ladebäck

7 September 2026 Round 20	Mjällby AIF	1–4	IFK Göteborg	Hällevik
19:00	Lindberg 83'	Report	Žugelj 59'; Simmelhack 63'; Larsson 75', 79'	Stadium: Strandvallen; Attendance: 4,143; Referee: Joakim Sars

12 September 2026 Round 21	IFK Göteborg	2–1	Halmstads BK	Gothenburg
17:30	Larsson 37'; Eriksson 52'	Report	Ascone 73' (pen.)	Stadium: Gamla Ullevi; Attendance: 15,821; Referee: Victor Wolf

19 September 2026 Round 22	IF Brommapojkarna	0–1	IFK Göteborg	Stockholm
15:00		Report	Simmelhack 51'	Stadium: Grimsta IP; Attendance: 2,585; Referee: Granit Maqedonci

9 October 2026 Round 23	IFK Göteborg	1–0	Västerås SK	Gothenburg
19:00	Tolf 9'	Report		Stadium: Gamla Ullevi; Attendance: 16,213; Referee: Richard Sundell

17 October 2026 Round 24	AIK	2–2	IFK Göteborg	Solna
18:10	Tomás 36'; Kouame 75'	Report	Žugelj 27'; Simmelhack 68'	Stadium: Nationalarenan; Attendance: 29,676; Referee: Kristoffer Karlsson

25 October 2026 Round 25	GAIS	1–1	IFK Göteborg	Gothenburg
14:00 UTC+1	Vasić 32' (pen.)	Report	Larsson 72'	Stadium: Gamla Ullevi; Attendance: 16,522; Referee: Mohammed Al-Hakim

28 October 2026 Round 26	IFK Göteborg	1–1	Djurgårdens IF	Gothenburg
19:00 UTC+1	Žugelj 39'	Report	Hegland 59'	Stadium: Gamla Ullevi; Attendance: 16,785; Referee: Adam Ladebäck

1 November 2026 Round 27	BK Häcken	1–0	IFK Göteborg	Gothenburg
16:30 UTC+1	Bager 16' (o.g.)	Report		Stadium: Nordic Wellness Arena; Attendance: 6,316; Referee: Fredrik Klitte

8 November 2026 Round 28	IFK Göteborg	0–0	Malmö FF	Gothenburg
14:00 UTC+1		Report		Stadium: Gamla Ullevi; Attendance: 16,124; Referee: Adi Aganović

23 November 2026 Round 29	Hammarby IF	v	IFK Göteborg	Stockholm
19:00 UTC+1				Stadium: 3Arena

29 November 2026 Round 30	IFK Göteborg	v	IK Sirius	Gothenburg
15:00 UTC+1				Stadium: Gamla Ullevi

=== Svenska Cupen ===
==== 2025–26 ====
The tournament continued from the 2025 season.

Kickoff times are in UTC+1.

===== Group stage =====
Pos	Team	Pld	W	D	L	GF	GA	GD	Pts	Qualification	IFKG	ÖFK	DEG	TFF
1	IFK Göteborg	3	2	1	0	7	1	+6	7	Advance to Knockout stage		0–0	3–1	
2	Östersunds FK	3	1	2	0	4	1	+3	5					3–0
3	Degerfors IF	3	1	1	1	5	4	+1	4			1–1		3–0
4	Trelleborgs FF	3	0	0	3	0	10	−10	0		0–4			

Source: SvFF
Rules for classification: 1) Points; 2) Goal difference; 3) Goals scored; 4) Head-to-head record; 5) Lowest disciplinary points; 6) Highest ranked team

21 February 2026 Matchday 1	IFK Göteborg	0–0	Östersunds FK	Gothenburg
13:00		Report		Stadium: Nordic Wellness Arena; Attendance: 5,507; Referee: Joakim Sars

28 February 2026 Matchday 2	Trelleborgs FF	0–4	IFK Göteborg	Trelleborg
15:00		Report	Alioum 6' (pen.); Tolf 42'; Clemmensen 51'; Heintz 77'	Stadium: Vångavallen; Attendance: 714; Referee: Fredrik Klitte

8 March 2026 Matchday 3	IFK Göteborg	3–1	Degerfors IF	Gothenburg
15:00	Fenger 2'; Þórðarson 24'; Alioum 31'	Report	Berisson 84'	Stadium: Nordic Wellness Arena; Attendance: 5,682; Referee: Granit Maqedonci

===== Knockout stage =====
15 March 2026 Quarter-finals	IK Sirius	1–0 (a.e.t.)	IFK Göteborg	Uppsala
17:15	Bjerkebo 104' (pen.)	Report		Stadium: Studenternas IP; Attendance: 6,620; Referee: Kristoffer Karlsson

==== 2026–27 ====
The tournament continues into the 2027 season.

===== Qualification stage =====
2 September 2026 Round 2	BK Olympic	0–5	IFK Göteborg	Malmö
19:00 UTC+2		Report	Simmelhack 7'; Eriksson 17'; Heintz 45'; Žugelj 53'; Fenger 90'	Stadium: Malmö IP; Referee: Rasmus Eriksson

=== UEFA Conference League ===
Kickoff times are in UTC+2 unless stated otherwise.

==== Qualifying ====
===== Second qualifying round =====
21 July 2026 First leg	IFK Göteborg (Sweden)	1−2	(Estonia) FCI Levadia	Gothenburg, Sweden
19:00	Nwankwo 90+2' (o.g.)	Report	Wendell 33', 45+1'	Stadium: Gamla Ullevi; Attendance: 15,749; Referee: Dmytro Panchyshyn (Ukraine)

30 July 2026 Second leg	FCI Levadia (Estonia)	1−3 (a.e.t.) (3–4 agg.)	(Sweden) IFK Göteborg	Tallinn, Estonia
19:30 UTC+3	Skvortsov 120+1'	Report	Bergmark Wiberg 57', 93'; Alioum 103'	Stadium: Lilleküla Stadium; Attendance: 7,725; Referee: Sigurd Kringstad (Norway)

===== Third qualifying round =====
6 August 2026 First leg	IFK Göteborg (Sweden)	0−1	(Belgium) Gent	Gothenburg, Sweden
19:00		Report	Goore 45'	Stadium: Gamla Ullevi; Attendance: 15,468; Referee: Antoni Bandić (Bosnia and Herzegovina)

13 August 2026 Second leg	Gent (Belgium)	1–1 (2–1 agg.)	(Sweden) IFK Göteborg	Ghent, Belgium
20:30	Volckaert 27'	Report	Alioum 85'	Stadium: Planet Group Arena; Attendance: 10,531; Referee: Gustavo Correia (Portugal)

== Non-competitive ==
=== Pre-season ===
Kickoff times are in UTC+1 unless stated otherwise.

23 January 2026 Friendly	Östers IF	1–3	IFK Göteborg	Växjö, Sweden
17:00	Kouakou 3'	Report	Borén 28'; Alioum 34'; Ersoy 55'	Stadium: Sportfältet Teleborg; Attendance: 935; Referee: Adi Aganović

2 February 2026 The Atlantic Cup	Rosenborg BK (Norway)	0–1	(Sweden) IFK Göteborg	Faro/Loulé, Portugal
19:30 UTC+0		Report	Fenger 90'	Stadium: Estádio Algarve; Attendance: 50

6 February 2026 The Atlantic Cup	IFK Göteborg (Sweden)	3–1	(Czech Republic) Artis Brno	Faro/Loulé, Portugal
14:00 UTC+0	Ottosson 15'; Fenger 30', 50'	Report	Navrátil 63'	Stadium: Estádio Algarve; Attendance: 50; Referee: Eduardo Rebocho (Portugal)

14 February 2026 Friendly	IFK Göteborg (Sweden)	4–2	(Norway) Stabæk	Gothenburg, Sweden
17:00	Alioum 10'; Ekorness 58' (o.g.); Clemmensen 67'; Fenger 72' (pen.)	Report	Wendt 50'; Oppedal 75'	Stadium: Valhalla IP; Attendance: 863; Referee: Fredrik Oppong

23 March 2026 Friendly	IFK Göteborg	2–1	IK Oddevold	Gothenburg, Sweden
15:00	Coimbra 74'; Fenger 90'	Report	Krezic 88'	Stadium: Valhalla IP; Referee: Joakim Sars

27 March 2026 Friendly	Vålerenga (Norway)	3–3	(Sweden) IFK Göteborg	Oslo, Norway
16:00	Sørensen 27'; Haren 32'; Tshiembe 84'	Report	Kruse 16'; Clemmensen 52'; Heintz 90+1'	Stadium: Intility Arena

=== Mid-season ===
Kickoff times are in UTC+2 unless stated otherwise.

18 June 2026 Friendly	IFK Göteborg (Sweden)	1–1	(Norway) Vålerenga	Gothenburg, Sweden
17:00	Ottosson 11'	Report	Lange 67'	Stadium: Hjällbovallen; Attendance: 500; Referee: Joakim Sars

27 June 2026 Friendly	IFK Göteborg (Sweden)	1–2	(Norway) HamKam	Gothenburg, Sweden
16:00	Erlingmark 9'	Report	Udahl 60' (pen.), 63'	Stadium: Torslandavallen; Attendance: 730; Referee: Fredrik Klitte

3 October 2026 Friendly	Arka Gdynia (Poland)	3–2	(Sweden) IFK Göteborg	Gdynia, Poland
19:00	Dzięgielewski 3'; Pawłowski 71', 79'	Report	Borén 47'; Žugelj 49'	Stadium: Stadion Miejski; Attendance: 10,020; Referee: Damian Kos (Poland)

12 November 2026 Friendly	Sarpsborg 08 (Norway)	4–0	(Sweden) IFK Göteborg	Sarpsborg, Norway
14:00 UTC+1	Utvik 18'; Halvorsen 74'; Gueye 79'; Büki 90'	Report		Stadium: Sarpsborg Stadion
