= 2025 IFK Göteborg season =

IFK Göteborg
2025 season
- Chairman: Magnus Nilsson
- Head coach: Stefan Billborn
- Stadium: Gamla Ullevi
- Allsvenskan: 4th
- 2024–25 Svenska Cupen: Semi-finals
- Top goalscorer: League: Max Fenger (12); All: Max Fenger (15)
- Highest home attendance: 26,190 vs. Hammarby IF (9 March 2025, Svenska Cupen); Allsvenskan: 18,021 vs. GAIS (28 April 2025)
- Lowest home attendance: 4,811 vs. Sandvikens IF (22 February 2025, Svenska Cupen); Allsvenskan: 15,357 vs. IF Brommapojkarna (21 September 2025)
- Average home league attendance: 16,615
- Biggest win: 4–0 vs. Hammarby IF (9 March 2025, Svenska Cupen); 4–0 vs. Qviding FIF (20 August 2025, Svenska Cupen)
- Biggest defeat: 0–4 vs. Hammarby IF (30 March 2025, Allsvenskan)
| Home colours | Away colours | Third colours |

The 2025 season was IFK Göteborg's 120th in existence, their 93rd season in Allsvenskan and their 49th consecutive season in the league. They competed in Allsvenskan and Svenska Cupen. League play started on 30 March and ended on 9 November.

== Players ==
=== Squad ===
Note: Flags indicate national team as defined under FIFA eligibility rules; some limited exceptions apply. Players may hold more than one non-FIFA nationality.

| No. | Pos. | Nation | Player |
|---|---|---|---|
| 1 | GK | SWE | Pontus Dahlberg (3rd captain) |
| 3 | DF | SWE | August Erlingmark (vice-captain) |
| 4 | DF | GHA | Rockson Yeboah |
| 5 | DF | DEN | Jonas Bager |
| 7 | FW | TOG | Sebastian Clemmensen |
| 8 | MF | SWE | Imam Jagne |
| 9 | FW | DEN | Max Fenger |
| 10 | MF | SWE | Ramon Pascal Lundqvist |
| 11 | FW | CMR | Saidou Alioum |
| 13 | DF | SWE | Gustav Svensson (captain) |
| 14 | FW | NOR | Tobias Heintz |

| No. | Pos. | Nation | Player |
|---|---|---|---|
| 15 | MF | DEN | David Kruse |
| 16 | FW | SWE | Linus Carlstrand |
| 18 | DF | SWE | Felix Eriksson |
| 19 | FW | ALB | Arbnor Muçolli |
| 22 | DF | SWE | Noah Tolf |
| 23 | MF | ISL | Kolbeinn Þórðarson |
| 25 | GK | SWE | Elis Bishesari |
| 26 | MF | SWE | Benjamin Brantlind |
| 27 | FW | SWE | Alfons Borén |
| 28 | MF | SWE | Lucas Kåhed |
| 29 | DF | DEN | Thomas Santos |

=== Transfers ===
==== In ====
| Date | Pos. | Player | From | Type | Fee | Ref. |
|---|---|---|---|---|---|---|
| 28 November 2024 | DF | (Sweden) Noah Tolf | Academy | | | |
| 13 December 2024 | MF | (Sweden) Imam Jagne | (Sweden) Mjällby AIF | Transfer | ~ 4.9M SEK | |
| 13 January 2025 | FW | (Norway) Tobias Heintz | (Bulgaria) CSKA Sofia | Free transfer | | |
| 6 February 2025 | FW | (Togo) Sebastian Clemmensen | (Sweden) Hammarby IF | Transfer | ~ 6.9M SEK | |
| 14 February 2025 | FW | (Denmark) Max Fenger | (Denmark) OB | Transfer | ~ 2.0M SEK | |
| 26 February 2025 | FW | (Sweden) Alfons Borén | Academy | | | |
| 21 May 2025 | GK | (Sweden) David Mikhail | (Sweden) IFK Värnamo | Free transfer | | |
| 1 July 2025 | FW | (Cameroon) Saidou Alioum | (Sweden) Hammarby IF | Transfer | ~ 7.0M SEK | |

==== Out ====
| Date | Pos. | Player | To | Type | Fee | Ref. |
|---|---|---|---|---|---|---|
| 20 November 2024 | MF | (Sweden) Sebastian Ohlsson | (Sweden) Degerfors IF | Free transfer | | |
| 21 November 2024 | DF | (Sweden) Emil Salomonsson | Retirement | | | |
| 22 November 2024 | DF | (Sweden) Oscar Wendt | Retirement | | | |
| 20 January 2025 | FW | (Denmark) Laurs Skjellerup | (Italy) Sassuolo | Transfer | ~ 40.2M SEK | |
| 21 January 2025 | FW | (Sweden) Gustaf Norlin | (Poland) ŁKS Łódź | Free transfer | | |
| 4 February 2025 | FW | (Sweden) Oscar Pettersson | (Netherlands) Go Ahead Eagles | Transfer | ~ 3.9M SEK | |
| 10 February 2025 | FW | (Nigeria) Suleiman Abdullahi | | Free transfer | | |
| 11 March 2025 | MF | (Ivory Coast) Abundance Salaou | (Sweden) Utsiktens BK | Loan | | |
| 1 July 2025 | MF | (Sweden) Adam Carlén | (Netherlands) Excelsior | Transfer | ~ 5.7M SEK | |
| 11 August 2025 | GK | (Sweden) David Mikhail | | Free transfer | | |
| 29 August 2025 | FW | (Norway) Eman Marković | (Poland) GKS Katowice | Transfer | Undisclosed | |
| 30 August 2025 | FW | (Sweden) Hussein Carneil | (Spain) Atlético Sanluqueño | Free transfer | | |
| 2 September 2025 | DF | (Norway) Anders Trondsen | (Norway) Sarpsborg 08 | Loan | | |

== Club ==
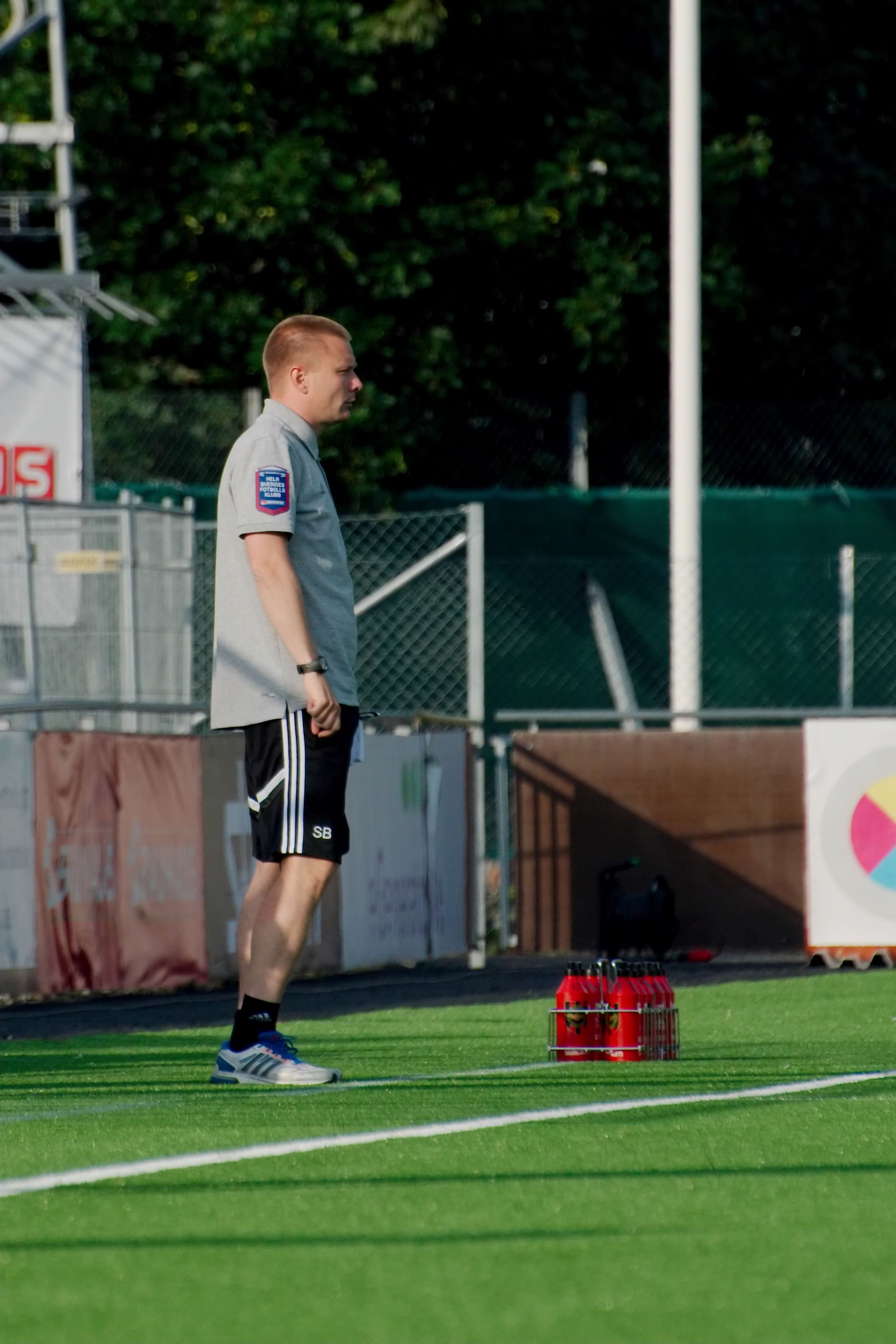
The 2025 season was Stefan Billborn's second season at IFK Göteborg.

=== Coaching staff ===
| Role | Name |
|---|---|
| Head coach | (Sweden) Stefan Billborn |
| Assistant coach | (Sweden) Joachim Björklund |
| Second assistant coach | (Sweden) Marcus Berg |
| Goalkeeping coach | (Scotland) Lee Baxter |
| Technical manager | (Sweden) Magnus Edlund |
| Analyst | (Sweden) Liam Wohlén |
| Scout | (Sweden) David Vuković |
| Strength and conditioning coach | (England) Hakeem Araba |
| Physiotherapists | (Sweden) Fredrik Larsson |
| Physiotherapists | (Sweden) Kaj Leuther |
| Physiotherapists | (Sweden) Calle Persson |
| Equipment managers | (Sweden) Rolf Gustavsson |
| Equipment managers | (Sweden) Håkan Lindahl |

=== Other information ===
| Chairman | (Sweden) Magnus Nilsson |
| Club director | (Sweden) Håkan Mild |
| Head of football | (Sweden) Jesper Jansson |
| Sporting director | (Sweden) Hannes Stiller |
| Assistant sporting director | (Sweden) Oscar Wendt |
| Ground (capacity and dimensions) | Gamla Ullevi (18,454 / 105x68 m) |

Source: IFK Göteborg and Gamla Ullevi

== Competitions ==
=== Overall ===
| Competition | Started round | Final position / round | First match | Last match |
|---|---|---|---|---|
| Allsvenskan | Matchday 1 | 4th | 30 March 2025 | 9 November 2025 |
| 2024–25 Svenska Cupen | Round 2 | Semi-finals | 22 August 2024 | 16 March 2025 |

Updated to match played 9 November 2025
Source: Competitions

=== Allsvenskan ===
==== League table ====
| Pos | Team | Pld | W | D | L | GF | GA | GD | Pts | Qualification or relegation |
|---|---|---|---|---|---|---|---|---|---|---|
| 2 | Hammarby IF | 30 | 19 | 5 | 6 | 60 | 29 | +31 | 62 | Qualification for the Europa League second qualifying round (Note: The 2025–26 Svenska Cupen winners qualifies for the Europa League second qualifying round. Since the cup winners (Mjällby AIF) qualified based on league position, the Europa League spot was passed to the second-placed team, and the second Conference League second qualifying round spot was passed to the fourth-placed team.) |
| 3 | GAIS | 30 | 14 | 10 | 6 | 45 | 30 | +15 | 52 | Qualification for the Conference League second qualifying round |
| 4 | IFK Göteborg | 30 | 16 | 3 | 11 | 41 | 33 | +8 | 51 | Qualification for the Conference League second qualifying round |
| 5 | Djurgårdens IF | 30 | 13 | 10 | 7 | 52 | 32 | +20 | 49 | |
| 6 | Malmö FF | 30 | 13 | 10 | 7 | 46 | 33 | +13 | 49 | |

Source: svenskfotboll.se (in Swedish)
Rules for classification: 1) Points; 2) Goal difference; 3) Goals scored; 4) Head-to-head points; 5) Head-to-head goal difference; 6) Head-to-head away goals scored; 7) Play-off
(Note: Play-off is only played if need to decide champion, teams for relegation or UEFA competition and will be played on a neutral ground).

==== Results summary ====
| Overall | | | | | | | | Home | | | | | | Away | | | | | |
| Pld | W | D | L | GF | GA | GD | Pts | W | D | L | GF | GA | GD | W | D | L | GF | GA | GD |
|---|---|---|---|---|---|---|---|---|---|---|---|---|---|---|---|---|---|---|---|
| 30 | 16 | 3 | 11 | 41 | 33 | +8 | 51 | 7 | 1 | 7 | 19 | 16 | +3 | 9 | 2 | 4 | 22 | 17 | +5 |

Last updated: 9 November 2025.
Source: svenskfotboll.se (in Swedish)

==== Results by round ====
| Round | 1 | 2 | 3 | 4 | 5 | 6 | 7 | 8 | 9 | 10 | 11 | 12 | 13 | 14 | 15 | 16 | 17 | 18 | 19 | 20 | 21 | 22 | 23 | 24 | 25 | 26 | 27 | 28 | 29 | 30 |
|---|---|---|---|---|---|---|---|---|---|---|---|---|---|---|---|---|---|---|---|---|---|---|---|---|---|---|---|---|---|---|
| Ground | A | H | A | H | A | H | A | H | H | A | H | A | A | H | H | A | A | H | A | H | A | H | A | H | A | H | H | A | A | H |
| Result | L | W | W | L | W | D | L | L | L | W | W | W | L | W | L | W | L | W | W | W | D | W | W | L | W | L | L | W | D | W |
| Position | 15 | 10 | 5 | 10 | 6 | 7 | 10 | 11 | 12 | 10 | 6 | 6 | 7 | 7 | 7 | 7 | 8 | 7 | 7 | 7 | 7 | 6 | 4 | 5 | 4 | 5 | 6 | 4 | 5 | 4 |

Updated to match(es) played on 9 November 2025. Source: see below
A = Away; H = Home; W = Win; D = Draw; L = Loss

==== Matches ====
Kickoff times are in UTC+2 unless stated otherwise.

| 30 March 2025 Round 1 | Hammarby IF | 4–0 | IFK Göteborg | Stockholm |
| 14:00 | M. Karlsson 21'; Erabi 42'; Besara 73'; Strand 85' | Report | | Stadium: 3Arena; Attendance: 30,217; Referee: Oscar Johnson |

| 5 April 2025 Round 2 | IFK Göteborg | 1–0 | Halmstads BK | Gothenburg |
| 15:00 | Fenger 54' | Report | | Stadium: Gamla Ullevi; Attendance: 17,251; Referee: Fredrik Klitte |

| 13 April 2025 Round 3 | IFK Värnamo | 0–1 | IFK Göteborg | Värnamo |
| 14:00 | | Report | Fenger 37' | Stadium: Finnvedsvallen; Attendance: 4,108; Referee: Tess Olofsson |

| 20 April 2025 Round 4 | IFK Göteborg | 2–3 | BK Häcken | Gothenburg |
| 16:30 | Þórðarson 38'; Fenger 45' (pen.) | Report | Hrstić 23'; Layouni 45+2'; Gustafson 90+7' | Stadium: Gamla Ullevi; Attendance: 17,318; Referee: Glenn Nyberg |

| 24 April 2025 Round 5 | IFK Norrköping | 2–3 | IFK Göteborg | Norrköping |
| 19:00 | Nyman 41'; Watson 45+1' | Report | Clemmensen 61'; Fenger 76', 85' (pen.) | Stadium: Nya Parken; Attendance: 8,718; Referee: Adam Ladebäck |

| 28 April 2025 Round 6 | IFK Göteborg | 1–1 | GAIS | Gothenburg |
| 19:10 | Kruse 67' | Report | Ibrahim 15' | Stadium: Gamla Ullevi; Attendance: 18,021; Referee: Joakim Östling |

| 4 May 2025 Round 7 | Mjällby AIF | 1–0 | IFK Göteborg | Hällevik |
| 16:30 | Røjkjær 30' | Report | | Stadium: Strandvallen; Attendance: 5,496; Referee: Mohammed Al-Hakim |

| 12 May 2025 Round 8 | IFK Göteborg | 1–2 | Djurgårdens IF | Gothenburg |
| 19:10 | Danielson 25' (o.g.) | Report | Nguen 4'; Haarala 77' | Stadium: Gamla Ullevi; Attendance: 16,872; Referee: Adam Ladebäck |

| 15 May 2025 Round 9 | IFK Göteborg | 0–1 | Östers IF | Gothenburg |
| 19:00 | | Report | Bishesari 58' (o.g.) | Stadium: Gamla Ullevi; Attendance: 15,754; Referee: Erik Mattsson |

| 19 May 2025 Round 10 | Degerfors IF | 1–3 | IFK Göteborg | Degerfors |
| 19:00 | Rafferty 52' | Report | Heintz 6', 32'; Fenger 9' | Stadium: Stora Valla; Attendance: 5,722; Referee: Fredrik Klitte |

| 25 May 2025 Round 11 | IFK Göteborg | 1–0 | Malmö FF | Gothenburg |
| 14:00 | Þórðarson 58' | Report | | Stadium: Gamla Ullevi; Attendance: 16,284; Referee: Victor Wolf |

| 1 June 2025 Round 12 | IF Brommapojkarna | 1–3 | IFK Göteborg | Stockholm |
| 14:00 | Jakobsen 63' (pen.) | Report | Þórðarson 24', 42'; Clemmensen 90+8' | Stadium: Grimsta IP; Attendance: 2,682; Referee: Kristoffer Karlsson |

| 29 June 2025 Round 13 | AIK | 3–0 | IFK Göteborg | Solna |
| 14:00 | Benković 30'; Filling 43'; Hove 61' | Report | | Stadium: Nationalarenan; Attendance: 38,172; Referee: Oscar Johnson |

| 6 July 2025 Round 14 | IFK Göteborg | 3–1 | IK Sirius | Gothenburg |
| 14:00 | Fenger 38' (pen.), 87'; Clemmensen 90+3' | Report | Walta 4' (pen.) | Stadium: Gamla Ullevi; Attendance: 16,212; Referee: Adam Ladebäck |

| 12 July 2025 Round 15 | IFK Göteborg | 1–2 | IF Elfsborg | Gothenburg |
| 15:00 | Clemmensen 26' | Report | Wikström 40', 45' | Stadium: Gamla Ullevi; Attendance: 16,617; Referee: Mohammed Al-Hakim |

| 20 July 2025 Round 16 | IK Sirius | 0–1 | IFK Göteborg | Uppsala |
| 14:00 | | Report | Kruse 59' | Stadium: Studenternas IP; Attendance: 6,730; Referee: Adi Aganović |

| 28 July 2025 Round 17 | IF Elfsborg | 4–3 | IFK Göteborg | Borås |
| 19:00 | Wikström 19'; Erlingmark 62' (o.g.); Larsson 90+3', 90+5' | Report | Heintz 4'; Fenger 14'; Alioum 20' | Stadium: Borås Arena; Attendance: 14,304; Referee: Glenn Nyberg |

| 4 August 2025 Round 18 | IFK Göteborg | 3–0 | Degerfors IF | Gothenburg |
| 19:00 | Fenger 36'; Þórðarson 45'; Santos 51' | Report | | Stadium: Gamla Ullevi; Attendance: 16,605; Referee: Kristoffer Karlsson |

| 11 August 2025 Round 19 | GAIS | 0–1 | IFK Göteborg | Gothenburg |
| 19:00 | | Report | Þórðarson 12' | Stadium: Gamla Ullevi; Attendance: 18,078; Referee: Fredrik Klitte |

| 17 August 2025 Round 20 | IFK Göteborg | 2–1 | AIK | Gothenburg |
| 14:00 | Heintz 37', 55' | Report | Isherwood 60' | Stadium: Gamla Ullevi; Attendance: 17,023; Referee: Mohammed Al-Hakim |

| 24 August 2025 Round 21 | Malmö FF | 0–0 | IFK Göteborg | Malmö |
| 16:30 | | Report | | Stadium: Stadion; Attendance: 20,597; Referee: Granit Maqedonci |

| 30 August 2025 Round 22 | IFK Göteborg | 1–0 | IFK Värnamo | Gothenburg |
| 15:00 | Tolf 45' | Report | | Stadium: Gamla Ullevi; Attendance: 15,919; Referee: Richard Sundell |

| 15 September 2025 Round 23 | BK Häcken | 1–2 | IFK Göteborg | Gothenburg |
| 19:10 | Rygaard 40' | Report | Heintz 13', 71' | Stadium: Bravida Arena; Attendance: 6,316; Referee: Kristoffer Karlsson |

| 21 September 2025 Round 24 | IFK Göteborg | 0–1 | IF Brommapojkarna | Gothenburg |
| 14:00 | | Report | Alladoh 56' | Stadium: Gamla Ullevi; Attendance: 15,357; Referee: Adi Aganović |

| 29 September 2025 Round 25 | Östers IF | 0–2 | IFK Göteborg | Växjö |
| 19:10 | | Report | Fenger 62'; Þórðarson 89' | Stadium: Spiris Arena; Attendance: 8,047; Referee: Oscar Johnson |

| 5 October 2025 Round 26 | IFK Göteborg | 1–2 | Hammarby IF | Gothenburg |
| 14:00 | Fenger 81' | Report | Abraham 3', 61' | Stadium: Gamla Ullevi; Attendance: 16,644; Referee: Mohammed Al-Hakim |

| 20 October 2025 Round 27 | IFK Göteborg | 0–2 | Mjällby AIF | Gothenburg |
| 19:10 | | Report | Bergström 21'; Pettersson 28' | Stadium: Gamla Ullevi; Attendance: 16,937; Referee: Kristoffer Karlsson |

| 26 October 2025 Round 28 | Halmstads BK | 0–3 | IFK Göteborg | Halmstad |
| 16:30 UTC+1 | | Report | Heintz 44'; Þórðarson 48'; Brantlind 86' | Stadium: Örjans Vall; Attendance: 8,424; Referee: Glenn Nyberg |

| 2 November 2025 Round 29 | Djurgårdens IF | 0–0 | IFK Göteborg | Stockholm |
| 16:30 UTC+1 | | Report | | Stadium: 3Arena; Attendance: 26,809; Referee: Granit Maqedonci |

| 9 November 2025 Round 30 | IFK Göteborg | 2–0 | IFK Norrköping | Gothenburg |
| 15:00 UTC+1 | Alioum 62'; Jagne 90+3' | Report | | Stadium: Gamla Ullevi; Attendance: 16,412; Referee: Mohammed Al-Hakim |

=== Svenska Cupen ===
==== 2024–25 ====
The tournament continued from the 2024 season.

Kickoff times are in UTC+1.

===== Group stage =====
| Pos | Team | Pld | W | D | L | GF | GA | GD | Pts | Qualification | IFKG | DIF | SIF | IKO |
|---|---|---|---|---|---|---|---|---|---|---|---|---|---|---|
| 1 | IFK Göteborg | 3 | 3 | 0 | 0 | 9 | 3 | +6 | 9 | Advance to Knockout stage | | | 3–0 | 2–0 |
| 2 | Djurgårdens IF | 3 | 1 | 1 | 1 | 7 | 6 | +1 | 4 | | 3–4 | | 2–0 | |
| 3 | Sandvikens IF | 3 | 1 | 0 | 2 | 1 | 5 | −4 | 3 | | | | | 1–0 |
| 4 | IK Oddevold | 3 | 0 | 1 | 2 | 2 | 5 | −3 | 1 | | | 2–2 | | |

Source: SvFF
Rules for classification: 1) Points; 2) Goal difference; 3) Goals scored; 4) Head-to-head record; 5) Lowest disciplinary points; 6) Highest ranked team

| 16 February 2025 Matchday 1 | IFK Göteborg | 2–0 | IK Oddevold | Gothenburg |
| 15:15 | Merbom Adolfsson 58' (o.g.); Heintz 72' | Report | | Stadium: Bravida Arena; Attendance: 5,157; Referee: Granit Maqedonci |

| 22 February 2025 Matchday 2 | IFK Göteborg | 3–0 | Sandvikens IF | Gothenburg |
| 17:30 | Lundqvist 14'; Clemmensen 51'; Jagne 70' | Report | | Stadium: Bravida Arena; Attendance: 4,811; Referee: Joakim Östling |

| 2 March 2025 Matchday 3 | Djurgårdens IF | 3–4 | IFK Göteborg | Stockholm |
| 13:00 | Žugelj 27'; Fallenius 41'; Kosugi 90+6' | Report | Jagne 12'; Fenger 45', 67'; Santos 86' | Stadium: 3Arena; Attendance: 17,731; Referee: Glenn Nyberg |

===== Knockout stage =====
| 9 March 2025 Quarter-finals | IFK Göteborg | 4–0 | Hammarby IF | Gothenburg |
| 13:00 | Heintz 25'; Marković 33', 72', 82' | Report | | Stadium: Ullevi; Attendance: 26,190; Referee: Fredrik Klitte |

| 16 March 2025 Semi-finals | Malmö FF | 3–2 (a.e.t.) | IFK Göteborg | Malmö |
| 16:00 | Kiese Thelin 31', 45+2'; Berg 112' | Report | Fenger 72'; Þórðarson 87' | Stadium: Stadion; Attendance: 20,742; Referee: Kristoffer Karlsson |

==== 2025–26 ====
The tournament continued into the 2026 season.

===== Qualification stage =====
| 20 August 2025 Round 2 | Qviding FIF | 0–4 | IFK Göteborg | Gothenburg |
| 18:30 UTC+2 | | Report | Marković 34'; Trondsen 38'; Bager 65', 88' | Stadium: Gamla Ullevi; Attendance: 5,018; Referee: Fredrik Oppong |

== Non-competitive ==
=== Pre-season ===
Kickoff times are in UTC+1 unless stated otherwise.

| 25 January 2025 Friendly | Lillestrøm SK (Norway) | 2–0 | (Sweden) IFK Göteborg | Lillestrøm, Norway |
| 14:00 | Drammeh 61'; Svenningsen 84' | Report | | Stadium: LSK-Hallen; Attendance: 1,500; Referee: Mohammad Usman Aslam (Norway) |

| 30 January 2025 The Atlantic Cup | IFK Göteborg (Sweden) | 1–0 | (Norway) Rosenborg BK | Faro/Loulé, Portugal |
| 19:00 UTC+0 | Marković 41' | Report | | Stadium: Estádio Algarve; Attendance: 50; Referee: Fá Sanhá (Portugal) |

| 5 February 2025 The Atlantic Cup | IFK Göteborg (Sweden) | 1–2 | (England) Brentford B | Faro/Loulé, Portugal |
| 20:00 UTC+0 | Erlingmark 44' | Report | Morgan 45+1'; Avenell 73' | Stadium: Estádio Algarve; Attendance: 50; Referee: Marcos Brazão (Portugal) |

| 22 March 2025 Friendly | IFK Göteborg (Sweden) | 2–0 | (Finland) IFK Mariehamn | Gothenburg, Sweden |
| 14:00 | Fenger 13'; Clemmensen 78' | Report | | Stadium: Valhalla IP; Attendance: 1,033; Referee: Fikret Buqa |

=== Mid-season ===
Kickoff times are in UTC+2.

| 19 June 2025 Friendly | IFK Göteborg | 3–3 | Östers IF | Alingsås, Sweden |
| 16:00 | Svensson 6'; Fenger 75', 87' (pen.) | Report | Uddenäs 12'; Ljung 72'; Seger 80' | Stadium: Mjörnvallen; Attendance: 1,846; Referee: Fredrik Oppong |

| 8 October 2025 Friendly | IFK Göteborg (Sweden) | 0–0 | (Norway) Lillestrøm SK | Ljungskile, Sweden |
| 14:00 | | Report | | Stadium: Skarsjövallen; Attendance: 120; Referee: Philip Lindh |
