= Benjamin Brantlind =

Swedish footballer (born 2008)

Personal information
- Full name: Benjamin Gustav Brantlind
- Date of birth: 15 August 2008 (age 18)
- Place of birth: Kungälv, Sweden
- Height: 1.83 m (6 ft 0 in)
- Position: Attacking midfielder

Team information
- Current team: Strasbourg
- Number: 45

Youth career
- –2019: IK Kongahälla
- 2019–2021: BK Häcken
- 2021–2023: IFK Göteborg

Senior career*
Years	Team	Apps	(Gls)
2024–2026	IFK Göteborg	22	(2)
2026–	Strasbourg	0	(0)

International career^{‡}
2023–2025	Sweden U17	23	(7)
2025–	Sweden U19	14	(9)
- * Club domestic league appearances and goals as of 17:18, 5 July 2026 (UTC) ‡ National team caps and goals as of 00:07, 4 October 2026 (UTC)

Benjamin Gustav Brantlind (born 15 August 2008) is a Swedish footballer who plays as an attacking midfielder for Ligue 1 club Strasbourg.

== Career ==
He made his first competitive match for IFK Göteborg against Djurgårdens IF in 2023–24 Svenska Cupen on 3 March 2024.

On 4 July 2026, IFK Göteborg confirmed the sale of Brantlind to Ligue 1 club RC Strasbourg Alsace. He signed a five-year contract running until 2031. The transfer fee was reported as €1 million plus up to €800,000 in bonuses.

== Career statistics ==
As of match played 31 May 2026

Appearances and goals by club, season and competition
Club	Season	League			Cup		Europe		Total	
Club	Season	Division	Apps	Goals	Apps	Goals	Apps	Goals	Apps	Goals
IFK Göteborg	2024	Allsvenskan	1	0	2	0	—		3	0
IFK Göteborg	2025	Allsvenskan	12	1	3	0	—		15	1
IFK Göteborg	2026	Allsvenskan	9	1	3	0	—		12	1
IFK Göteborg	Total		22	1	8	0	—		30	2
Strasbourg	2026–27	Ligue 1	0	0	0	0	—		0	0
Career total			22	1	8	0	0	0	30	2
