= Viktor Andersson (footballer) =

Swedish footballer (born 2004)

Personal information
- Full name: Johan Viktor Andersson
- Date of birth: 30 March 2004 (age 22)
- Place of birth: Malmö, Sweden
- Height: 1.89 m (6 ft 2 1/2 in)
- Position: Goalkeeper

Team information
- Current team: IFK Göteborg (on loan from IFK Värnamo)
- Number: 12

Youth career
- –2015: GIF Nike
- 2015–2022: Malmö FF

Senior career*
| Years | Team | Apps | (Gls) |
| 2022–2023 | Malmö FF | 0 | (0) |
| 2023 | → Lunds BK (loan) | 26 | (0) |
| 2024– | IFK Värnamo | 19 | (0) |
| 2026– | → IFK Göteborg (loan) | 9 | (0) |

International career^{‡}
| 2021–2022 | Sweden U19 | 2 | (0) |
| 2024–2026 | Sweden U21 | 3 | (0) |
- * Club domestic league appearances and goals as of 19:05, 19 September 2026 (UTC) ‡ National team caps and goals as of 17:07, 6 October 2026 (UTC)

Johan Viktor Andersson (born 30 March 2004) is a Swedish professional footballer who plays as a goalkeeper for Allsvenskan side IFK Göteborg, on loan from Superettan side IFK Värnamo. He is a former Sweden youth international.

== Club career ==
He joined Malmö FF at the age of 11 years-old. On 20 May 2022, he signed his first senior contract with the club, agreeing to a three and-a-half year deal. In December 2022, he was loaned to Lunds BK on a season-long loan where he played 26 matches in Ettan Fotboll in the 2023 season, keeping ten clean sheets.

On 13 December 2023, Andersson was signed by IFK Värnamo on a three and-a-half year contract. He made his competitive debut on 2 March 2024 in a 1–0 loss against Halmstads BK in the group stage of the 2023-2024 Svenska Cupen, where he was substituted on in the second half for the injured Jonathan Rasheed. He subsequently made his Allsvenskan debut in the on 1 April 2024, in a 2–2 draw against IF Elfsborg. With Rasheed sidelined he continued as the club's first choice keeper that season.

== International career ==
In November 2024, he made his debut for Sweden U21 against Ireland U21.
