= Supporterklubben Änglarna =

IFK Göteborg supporter club

Supporterklubben Änglarna ("Supporters' association the Angels"), often called only Änglarna, is the official supporters' association of the Swedish football club IFK Göteborg, from Gothenburg. Änglarna is not attached to the club, and is controlled and organised by people not hired by the club. It is a non-profit-making association which was started in 1969, although the year of foundation is often set as 1973, when the association really became active. It has around 3,500 members.
