= David Mikhail =

Swedish footballer (born 1998)

Personal information
- Full name: David Mikhail
- Date of birth: 13 December 1998 (age 27)
- Place of birth: Stockholm, Sweden
- Height: 1.88 m (6 ft 2 in)
- Position: Goalkeeper

Youth career
- Södertälje FF
- IF Brommapojkarna
- –2016: Syrianska
- 2017: Huddinge

Senior career*
Years	Team	Apps	(Gls)
2018–2019	Huddinge	33	(0)
2020–2022	Stockholm Internazionale	21	(0)
2023	Täby	30	(0)
2024–2025	IFK Värnamo	0	(0)
2024	→ Lahti (loan)	3	(0)
2025	IFK Göteborg	0	(0)
- * Club domestic league appearances and goals as of 09:38, 24 May 2025 (UTC)

David Mikhail (born 13 December 1998) is a Swedish footballer who plays as a goalkeeper.

== Club career ==
After playing for Stockholm Internazionale and Täby FK, Mikhail signed with IFK Värnamo on 1 March 2024.

On 23 August 2024, he was loaned out to Lahti in Finnish Veikkausliiga for the remainder of the season. He made four appearances for the club, but returned to Värnamo after Lahti was relegated at the end of the season.

== Personal life ==
Mikhail is of Egyptian descent. His brother Marcus is also a footballer.

He has studied law at the Stockholm University and works as lawyer.
