= Karlsrofältet =

Former football pitch in Gothenburg, Sweden

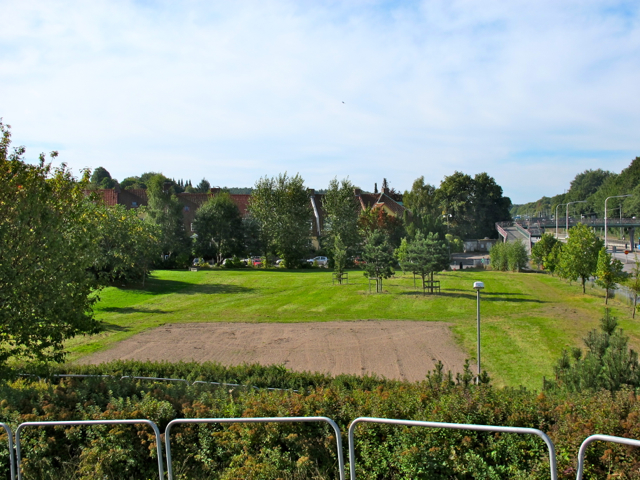
- Karlsrofältet in 2013
- Interactive map of Karlsrofältet
- Location: Gothenburg, Sweden
- Coordinates: 57.685556°N 11.953333°E
- Owner: Gothenburg Municipality
- Type: Football field
- Surface: Dirt

Construction
- Built: 1890s
- Renovated: 1906
- Closed: 1950s

Tenant
- IFK Göteborg 1904–1910

Karlsrofältet (transl. The Karlsro Field) is a former football pitch in Gothenburg, Sweden. It was the first home ground of IFK Göteborg, and was used extensively for grassroots football until the 1950s.

== History ==
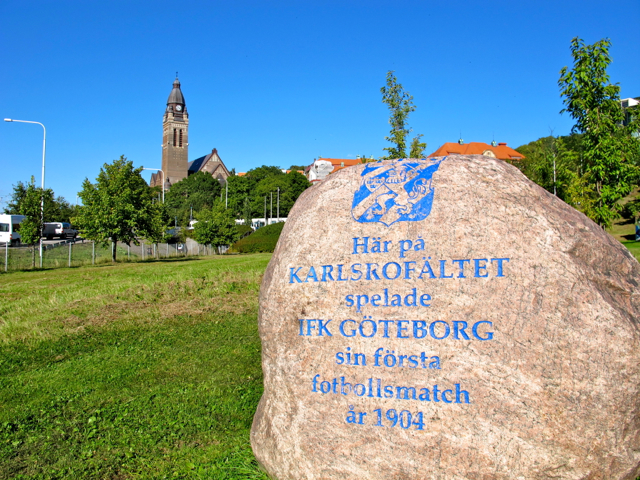
The memorial stone at Karlsrofältet. The Annedal Church is visible in the background.

The site was originally planned to house the new Sahlgrenska University Hospital, and the municipality bought the land in 1896 for that purpose. The plans were however changed and the land was instead converted to a playground for the planned Änggården garden city. Sports clubs from around the nearby Linnéstaden district also started using the field.

One such club was IFK Göteborg founded in 1904, who played their first match—a training match between the first and second team of the club—on the field. A memorial stone was raised on the field by IFK Göteborg in 1982 bearing the text "Founded 4-10-1904, Karlsrofältet, This is where IFK started their football career" (Swedish: "Stiftad 4-10-1904, Karlsrofältet, Här startade IFK sin fotbollskarriär") and a list of achievements by the club, including the 1982 UEFA Cup victory. The original stone has later been replaced by a new stone with the text "Here on Karlsrofältet, IFK Göteborg played their first football match in 1904" (Swedish: "Här på Karlsrofältet spelade IFK Göteborg sin första fotbollsmatch år 1904").

The field was renovated in 1906, ensuring correct playing dimensions and regulation goalposts. It was mainly used for training and lower league games—the Gothenburg Football Association used the pitch for some league games from 1907 to 1909—, due to the lack of changing rooms and a very uneven pitch. Karlsrofältet was largely unused for matches during the First World War, but again saw increased use after the war. The short distance to the Annedal Church caused problems when Annedals IS and Haga BK organised a match played during Good Friday morning service in the early 1920s, which was not allowed at the time. IFK Göteborg stopped using the venue for training in 1910, but returned a final time in 1923 to play the season premiere at Karlsrofältet in front of a crowd of 4,000.

Lower league matches continued to be played on the field during the 1930s and 1940s—with reduced activity during the Second World War—, but all official activity was moved from the field in the 1950s due to major traffic rerouting nearby claiming part of the ground, and in 1960 the pitch size was reduced from the previous full-size to seven-a-side measurements, due to further traffic projects in the area.
