= Alfons Borén =

Swedish footballer (born 2006)

Personal information
- Full name: Alfons Borén
- Date of birth: 13 September 2006 (age 20)
- Place of birth: Kungsbacka, Sweden
- Height: 1.80 m (5 ft 11 in)
- Position: Winger

Team information
- Current team: IFK Göteborg
- Number: 27

Youth career
- Lerkils IF
- –2023: Varbergs BoIS
- 2024: IFK Göteborg

Senior career*
Years	Team	Apps	(Gls)
2025–	IFK Göteborg	8	(1)
2026	→ Ljungskile SK (loan)	20	(1)
- * Club domestic league appearances and goals as of 12 November 2026

Alfons Borén (born 13 September 2006) is a Swedish footballer who plays for IFK Göteborg as a winger.

== Career ==
=== IFK Göteborg ===
On 26 February 2025, Borén signed his first senior contract with Allsvenskan club IFK Göteborg. He signed a four-year contract with the club. He made his first competitive match for IFK Göteborg against Qviding FIF in 2025–26 Svenska Cupen on 20 August 2025. Two months later, on 26 October 2025, Borén made his debut in Allsvenskan against Halmstads BK, after being substituted in for Max Fenger in the 89th minute.
