= Gabriel Ersoy =

Swedish footballer

Personal information
- Full name: Gabriel Elias Ersoy
- Date of birth: 27 June 2005 (age 21)
- Place of birth: Jakobsberg, Sweden
- Height: 1.87 m (6 ft 2 in)
- Position: Centre-back

Team information
- Current team: IFK Göteborg
- Number: 20

Youth career
- FC Järfälla
- AIK
- IF Brommapojkarna
- –2022: Vasalund IF

Senior career*
Years	Team	Apps	(Gls)
2022–2025	Vasalund IF	62	(4)
2026–	IFK Göteborg	0	(0)
- * Club domestic league appearances and goals as of 16:00, 19 April 2026 (UTC)

Gabriel Elias Ersoy (born 27 June 2005) is a Swedish footballer who plays as a centre-back for IFK Göteborg.

== Club career ==
Ersoy began his youth career at local side FC Järfälla before joining IF Brommapojkarna at the age of Nine. After four years at the club he joined AIK where he spent 2 years before moving to Vasalund IF. On the 19 December 2025, IFK Göteborg announced the signing of Ersoy.
