= Leo Radaković =

Swedish footballer (born 2007)

Personal information
- Full name: Leo Radaković
- Date of birth: 21 July 2007 (age 19)
- Place of birth: Gothenburg, Sweden
- Position: Attacking midfielder

Team information
- Current team: IFK Göteborg
- Number: 21

Youth career
- 2015–2025: IFK Göteborg

Senior career*
Years	Team	Apps	(Gls)
2025–	IFK Göteborg	3	(0)
- * Club domestic league appearances and goals as of 23:16, 11 September 2026 (UTC)

Leo Radaković (born 21 July 2007) is a Swedish footballer who plays as an attacking midfielder for Allsvenskan club IFK Göteborg.

== Club career ==
On 20 August 2025, Radaković made his debut for IFK Göteborg in Svenska Cupen against Qviding FIF. On 27 November 2025, he signed a first-team contract until 2028. He made his Allsvenskan debut for IFK Göteborg against Malmö FF on 12 July 2026.
