= Sebastian Clemmensen =

Danish-Togolese footballer (born 2003)

Personal information
- Full name: Sebastian Senna Hounou Clemmensen
- Date of birth: 1 September 2003 (age 23)
- Place of birth: Tårnby, Denmark
- Height: 1.83 m (6 ft 0 in)
- Positions: Striker; winger

Team information
- Current team: Rio Ave

Youth career
- –2018: Kastrup BK
- 2019–2020: FC Copenhagen
- 2020–2023: B.93

Senior career*
Years	Team	Apps	(Gls)
2023–2024	B.93	35	(12)
2024	Hammarby IF	3	(0)
2025–2026	IFK Göteborg	40	(7)
2026–	Rio Ave	0	(0)

International career^{‡}
2024	Togo U23	1	(1)
- * Club domestic league appearances and goals as of 19:31, 3 September 2026 (UTC) ‡ National team caps and goals as of 21:38, 11 February 2025 (UTC)

Sebastian Senna Hounou Clemmensen (born 1 September 2003) is a professional footballer who plays as a striker and winger for Rio Ave. Born in Denmark, he represents Togo at an international level.

== Club career ==
Clemmensen played for B.93 in Denmark, after also playing youth football for Kastrup BK and FC Copenhagen. He made his senior debut for B.93 in a league game against AB in May 2023.

On 25 August 2024, Clemmensen signed a four-and-a-half-year contract with Hammarby IF. He made his Allsvenskan debut in a 0–0 draw against IF Elfsborg on 22 September 2024, being substituted in for Bazoumana Touré in the 84th minute.

On 6 February 2025, Clemmensen signed a four-year contract with IFK Göteborg.

== International career ==
Clemmensen made his debut for the Togo U23 team in January 2024.
