= Issaka Seidu =

Ghanaian footballer

Personal information
- Full name: Issaka Seidu
- Date of birth: 5 June 2006 (age 20)
- Place of birth: Savelugu, Ghana
- Height: 1.76 m (5 ft 9 in)
- Position: Left-back

Team information
- Current team: IFK Göteborg (on loan from Nordsjælland)
- Number: 28

Youth career
- –2024: Right to Dream Academy
- 2024–2025: Nordsjælland

Senior career*
Years	Team	Apps	(Gls)
2025–	Nordsjælland	5	(0)
2026	→ Ljungskile SK (loan)	13	(1)
2026–	→ IFK Göteborg (loan)	6	(0)
- * Club domestic league appearances and goals as of 23:19, 11 September 2026 (UTC)

Issaka Seidu (born 5 June 2006), also known by his nickname Baba, is a Ghanaian footballer who plays as a left-back for Allsvenskan club IFK Göteborg, on loan from Danish Superliga club Nordsjælland.

== Career ==
Seidu spent the first half of the 2026 Superettan season on loan from Nordsjælland to Ljungskile SK. On 8 July 2026, he signed a loan contract with Allsvenskan club IFK Göteborg until 30 June 2027.

== Career statistics ==
As of match played 22 July 2026

Appearances and goals by club, season and competition
Club	Season	League			Cup		Europe		Other		Total	
Club	Season	Division	Apps	Goals	Apps	Goals	Apps	Goals	Apps	Goals	Apps	Goals
Nordsjælland	2025–26	Danish Superliga	5	0	2	0	—		—		7	0
Ljungskile SK (loan)	2026	Superettan	13	1	—		—		—		13	1
IFK Göteborg (loan)	2026	Allsvenskan	0	0	0	0	1 (Note: Appearances in UEFA Conference League)	0	—		1	0
Career total			18	1	2	0	1	0	0	0	21	1
