= Max Fenger =

Danish footballer (born 2001)

Personal information
- Full name: Max Johannes Whitta Fenger
- Date of birth: 7 August 2001 (age 25)
- Place of birth: Himmelev, Denmark
- Height: 1.85 m (6 ft 1 in)
- Positions: Striker; winger

Team information
- Current team: IFK Göteborg
- Number: 9

Youth career
- –2018: FC Roskilde
- 2018–2020: OB

Senior career*
Years	Team	Apps	(Gls)
2020–2025	OB	90	(15)
2023	→ Mjällby AIF (loan)	30	(6)
2025–	IFK Göteborg	44	(12)
- * Club domestic league appearances and goals as of 19:00, 19 September 2026 (UTC)

Max Johannes Whitta Fenger (Danish pronunciation: [ˈfeŋɐ]; born 7 August 2001) is a Danish professional footballer who plays as a striker or a winger for Allsvenskan club IFK Göteborg.

== Club career ==
Fenger started playing in the youth system at FC Roskilde, before signing with OB on 8 August 2018, after scoring 26 goals in a season in the U17 league for Roskilde. He initially became part of the under-19 team of OB.

He made his professional debut on 1 June 2020 in a 1–0 away loss to AGF, coming on as a substitute in the 47th minute for Mart Lieder. His first goal for the club came in the play-offs for European football, scoring in a 2–1 away loss to Randers FC on 11 July after making a start. In the return game, he secured advancement for OB by scoring a brace as the team won 2–0 at home. Fenger finished his first season in the first team with 10 appearances, in which he scored four goals – all in the play-offs for European football, which OB eventually lost out after a 1–0 loss to AGF.

Fenger struggled to find playing time the following season, as he was sidelined with a knee injury which he suffered in a loss to Brøndby IF on 8 November 2020. He made his comeback on 9 April 2021 in a 0–1 home loss to Vejle Boldklub as a late substitute.

On 23 March 2023, Fenger was sent on loan to Allsvenskan club Mjällby AIF until 31 July 2023. On 27 July 2023 the club confirmed, that the loan spell had been extended until the end of 2023.

On 14 February 2025, Fenger signed a three-year contract with IFK Göteborg.

== Career statistics ==
As of match played 21 February 2026

Appearances and goals by club, season and competition
Club	Season	League			National cup (Note: Includes Danish Cup, Svenska Cupen)		Europe		Other		Total	
Club	Season	Division	Apps	Goals	Apps	Goals	Apps	Goals	Apps	Goals	Apps	Goals
OB	2019–20	Superliga	6	0	0	0	—		4 (Note: Appearances in Superliga Europa League play-off)	4	10	4
OB	2020–21	Superliga	17	1	1	0	—		—		18	1
OB	2021–22	Superliga	32	6	7	2	—		—		39	8
OB	2022–23	Superliga	5	0	1	0	—		—		6	0
OB	2023–24	Superliga	13	3	0	0	—		—		13	3
OB	2024–25	1st Division	17	5	1	0	—		—		18	5
OB	Total		90	15	10	2	0	0	4	4	104	21
Mjällby AIF (loan)	2023	Allsvenskan	30	6	2	1	—		—		32	7
IFK Göteborg	2025	Allsvenskan	30	12	4	3	—		—		34	15
IFK Göteborg	2026	Allsvenskan	0	0	1	0	—		—		1	0
IFK Göteborg	Total		30	12	5	3	—		—		35	15
Career total			135	28	18	6	0	0	4	4	157	38
