= Emil Fasth =

Swedish footballer (born 2009)

Personal information
- Full name: Emil Carl Olof Fasth
- Date of birth: 5 May 2008 (age 18)
- Place of birth: Kristianstad, Sweden
- Height: 1.78 m (5 ft 10 in)
- Position: Centre-back

Team information
- Current team: IFK Göteborg
- Number: 26

Youth career
- Kristianstad BoIS
- –2024: Nosaby IF
- 2024–2026: IFK Göteborg

Senior career*
Years	Team	Apps	(Gls)
2024	Nosaby IF	13	(0)
2026–	IFK Göteborg	2	(0)
2026	→ FC Trollhättan (loan)	18	(0)

International career^{‡}
2025–	Sweden U19	7	(0)
- * Club domestic league appearances and goals as of 19:13, 19 September 2026 (UTC) ‡ National team caps and goals as of 00:05, 4 October 2026 (UTC)

Emil Carl Olof Fasth (born 5 May 2008) is a Swedish footballer who plays as a centre-back for Allsvenskan club IFK Göteborg.

== Career ==
He made his Allsvenskan debut for IFK Göteborg against Mjällby AIF on 7 September 2026.
