= Oliver Månsson =

Swedish footballer (born 2009)

Personal information
- Full name: Oliver Johan Månsson
- Date of birth: 4 August 2009 (age 17)
- Place of birth: Falkenberg, Sweden
- Height: 1.84 m (6 ft 0 in)
- Position: Central midfielder

Team information
- Current team: IFK Göteborg
- Number: 24

Youth career
- –2021: IF Böljan
- 2022–2026: IFK Göteborg

Senior career*
Years	Team	Apps	(Gls)
2026–	IFK Göteborg	11	(0)

International career^{‡}
2024–2026	Sweden U17	25	(2)
2026–	Sweden U19	3	(0)
- * Club domestic league appearances and goals as of 19:12, 19 September 2026 (UTC) ‡ National team caps and goals as of 18:52, 7 October 2026 (UTC)

Oliver Johan Månsson (born 4 August 2009) is a Swedish footballer who plays as a central midfielder for Allsvenskan club IFK Göteborg.

== Career ==
He made his Allsvenskan debut for IFK Göteborg against Djurgårdens IF on 4 May 2026.
