= Jonathan Rasheed =

Norwegian footballer (born 1991)

Personal information
- Full name: Jonathan Ayola Ursin Rasheed
- Date of birth: 21 November 1991 (age 34)
- Place of birth: Gothenburg, Sweden
- Height: 1.91 m (6 ft 3 in)
- Position: Goalkeeper

Team information
- Current team: IFK Göteborg
- Number: 1

Youth career
- Kortedala IF
- GAIS

Senior career*
Years	Team	Apps	(Gls)
2008	Lärje-Angereds IF	2	(0)
2010	Qviding FIF	0	(0)
2011–2012	IF Sylvia	26	(0)
2013	Stabæk 2	22	(0)
2013	Stabæk	0	(0)
2014	Alta IF	1	(0)
2014	Ljungskile SK	0	(0)
2015	Follo FK	28	(0)
2016	IFK Värnamo	30	(0)
2017–2022	BK Häcken	9	(0)
2022–2024	IFK Värnamo	38	(0)
2025	KA	3	(0)
2026–	IFK Göteborg	0	(0)
- * Club domestic league appearances and goals as of 21:52, 19 January 2026 (UTC)

Jonathan Ayola Ursin Rasheed (born 21 November 1991) is a professional footballer who plays as a goalkeeper for Allsvenskan club IFK Göteborg. Born in Sweden, he is a citizen of Norway and Nigeria.

== Club career ==
Rasheed started his youth career with Kortedala IF, played junior football for GAIS and started his senior career with Qviding FIF. After two years with limited play in third-tier IF Sylvia he moved to Norwegian club Stabæk Fotball as second-choice goalkeeper. Not featuring once for the first team, in 2014 he was signed by Alta IF, but did not play more than once there either.

In 2015 and 2016 he was finally a first-choice goalkeeper, first for Norwegian second-tier side Follo FK and then for Swedish second-tier side IFK Värnamo. He was brought to BK Häcken and finally made his debut in a fully professional league in 2018. He missed all of 2019 due to injury.

Rasheed left Häcken for Värnamo, now an Allsvenskan club, in 2022. Rasheed overtok Pilip Vaitsiakhovich as first-choice goalkeeper in 2023.

== Personal life ==
Rasheed was born in Sweden to a Nigerian father and a Norwegian mother.

== Honours ==
BK Häcken

- Allsvenskan: 2022
