= Elis Bishesari =

Swedish footballer (born 2005)

Personal information
- Full name: Elis Ștefan Bishesari
- Date of birth: 19 May 2005 (age 21)
- Place of birth: Stockholm, Sweden
- Height: 1.85 m (6 ft 1 in)
- Position: Goalkeeper

Team information
- Current team: IFK Göteborg
- Number: 25

Youth career
- Hässelby SK
- AIK
- –2022: IF Brommapojkarna
- 2023–2024: IFK Göteborg

Senior career*
Years	Team	Apps	(Gls)
2024–	IFK Göteborg	52	(0)
2024	→ Västra Frölunda IF (loan)	3	(0)

International career^{‡}
2021–2022	Sweden U17	12	(0)
2022–2023	Sweden U19	8	(0)
2024–2026	Sweden U21	12	(0)
- * Club domestic league appearances and goals as of 14:43, 19 July 2026 (UTC) ‡ National team caps and goals as of 17:38, 1 April 2026 (UTC)

Elis Ștefan Bishesari (born 19 May 2005) is a Swedish professional footballer who plays as a goalkeeper for Allsvenskan club IFK Göteborg.

== Club career ==
Elis Bishesari made his Allsvenskan debut during their season opener against Djurgårdens IF on 1 April 2024.

== International career ==
In June 2019, Bishesari was named in the national under-15 team of Romania, which he is eligible for through his mother. He made his debut for Sweden U17 on 7 August 2021 against Denmark. He was named in Sweden's squad for the 2022 UEFA European Under-17 Championship in Israel and played a total of 12 matches for the Swedish national under-17 team. In 2022, he was called up for Sweden U19.

== Personal life ==
Elis Ștefan Bishesari was born in Stockholm, Sweden. He has Romanian descent from his mother and Iranian descent from his father.

== Career statistics ==
=== Club ===
As of match played 21 July 2026

Appearances and goals by club, season and competition
Club	Season	League			National Cup		Continental		Other		Total	
Club	Season	Division	Apps	Goals	Apps	Goals	Apps	Goals	Apps	Goals	Apps	Goals
IFK Göteborg	2023	Allsvenskan	0	0	0	0	—		—		0	0
IFK Göteborg	2024	Allsvenskan	16	0	1	0	—		—		17	0
IFK Göteborg	2025	Allsvenskan	23	0	2	0	—		—		25	0
IFK Göteborg	2026	Allsvenskan	13	0	1	0	1 (Note: Appearance(s) in UEFA Conference League)	0	—		15	0
Career total			52	0	4	0	1	0	0	0	57	0
