= Noah Tolf =

Swedish footballer (born 2005)

Personal information
- Full name: Noah Klas Tolf
- Date of birth: 13 August 2005 (age 21)
- Place of birth: Alingsås, Sweden
- Height: 1.80 m (5 ft 11 in)
- Positions: Left-back; central midfielder

Team information
- Current team: IFK Göteborg
- Number: 22

Youth career
- –2020: Gerdskens BK
- 2021–2024: IFK Göteborg

Senior career*
Years	Team	Apps	(Gls)
2024–	IFK Göteborg	45	(1)
2024	→ Västra Frölunda IF (loan)	23	(5)

International career^{‡}
2025–2026	Sweden U21	9	(0)
- * Club domestic league appearances and goals as of 19:10, 19 September 2026 (UTC) ‡ National team caps and goals as of 17:12, 6 October 2026 (UTC)

Noah Klas Tolf (born 13 August 2005) is a Swedish footballer who plays as a left-back, central midfielder for IFK Göteborg.

== Career ==
Tolf made his first Allsvenskan match for IFK Göteborg in a 3–0 win against IF Brommapojkarna on 29 April 2024, being substituted in for Kolbeinn Þórðarson in the 85th minute. He spend the majority on the 2024 season on loan in Västra Frölunda IF in Division 2, where he played 23 games and won the Midfielder of the Year award in Division 2 Västra Götaland.

On 28 November 2024, Tolf signed a first-team contract with IFK Göteborg until 2028. Upon joining the first team, Tolf changed his primary position to left-back.

== Honours ==
Individual

- Allsvenskan Newcomer of the year: 2025
