= David Kruse =

Danish footballer (born 2002)

Personal information
- Full name: David Kjær Kruse
- Date of birth: 15 May 2002 (age 24)
- Place of birth: Uldum, Denmark
- Height: 1.85 m (6 ft 1 in)
- Position: Central midfielder

Team information
- Current team: IFK Göteborg
- Number: 15

Youth career
- Sole IF
- Hedensted IF
- Horsens

Senior career*
Years	Team	Apps	(Gls)
2019–2023	Horsens	67	(0)
2023–2024	Valenciennes	22	(1)
2024–	IFK Göteborg	61	(4)

International career^{‡}
2022	Denmark U20	2	(0)
2023–2024	Denmark U21	9	(0)
- * Club domestic league appearances and goals as of 19:07, 19 September 2026 (UTC) ‡ National team caps and goals as of 19:53, 9 December 2024 (UTC)

David Kjær Kruse (born 15 May 2002) is a Danish professional footballer who plays as a midfielder for Allsvenskan club IFK Göteborg.

== Career ==
=== Horsens ===
Kruse started playing football at Sole IF, where he played for 4,5-years. He later joined Hedensted IF, where he was for 1,5-years, before joining AC Horsens as a U13 player. In August 2019, after a good season with the U17s, games for the reserve team and training with the first team, 17-year old Kruse signed a contract with Horsens until June 2022.

Shortly after, on 4 September 2019, Kruse got his official debut for Horsens in a Danish Cup game against BK Union. This was his only official first team appearance in the 2019–20 season.

In September 2020 Horsens confirmed, that 18-year old Kruse had been permanently promoted to the first team squad. After two Danish Cup appearances in beginning of the 2020–21 season, Kruse got his Danish Superliga debut for Horsens on 11 April 2021 against SønderjyskE. He made a total of five appearances in the Superliga, before he signed a contract extension at the end of the season, until June 2025.

=== Valenciennes ===
On 10 August 2023 it was confirmed, that Kruse had been sold to Ligue 2 side Valenciennes FC, signing a three-year deal, with an option for one further year.

=== IFK Göteborg ===
On 1 August 2024, Allsvenskan club IFK Göteborg confirmed that they had signed Kruse on a deal until the end of 2028.
