= Felix Eriksson (footballer) =

Swedish footballer

Personal information
- Full name: Felix David William Eriksson
- Date of birth: 21 May 2004 (age 22)
- Place of birth: Ljungby, Sweden
- Height: 1.77 m (5 ft 10 in)
- Position: Right-back

Team information
- Current team: IFK Göteborg
- Number: 18

Youth career
- –2018: GAIS
- 2019–2022: IFK Göteborg

Senior career*
| Years | Team | Apps | (Gls) |
| 2022– | IFK Göteborg | 44 | (2) |
| 2023 | → Utsiktens BK (loan) | 3 | (0) |
| 2024 | → Sogndal (loan) | 28 | (3) |

International career^{‡}
| 2020 | Sweden U17 | 2 | (0) |
| 2021–2023 | Sweden U19 | 13 | (0) |
| 2025 | Sweden U21 | 2 | (0) |
- * Club domestic league appearances and goals as of 19:08, 19 September 2026 (UTC) ‡ National team caps and goals as of 18:47, 18 November 2025 (UTC)

Felix David William Eriksson (born 21 May 2004) is a Swedish footballer who plays as a right-back for IFK Göteborg.
