= IFK Göteborg =

Football club in Gothenburg, Sweden

Göteborg
- Full name: Idrottsföreningen Kamraterna Göteborg (officially IFK Göteborg Fotboll)
- Nicknames: Blåvitt (Blue-White); Änglarna (The Angels); Kamraterna (The Comrades)
- Short name: IFK
- Founded: 4 October 1904; 122 years ago
- Ground: Gamla Ullevi, Gothenburg
- Capacity: 18,454
- Owner: Member-owned
- Chairman: Magnus Nilsson
- Head coach: Joachim Björklund
- League: Allsvenskan
- 2025: Allsvenskan, 4th of 16
- Website: ifkgoteborg.se
Home colours	Away colours

Idrottsföreningen Kamraterna Göteborg (officially IFK Göteborg Fotboll), commonly known as IFK Göteborg, IFK (especially locally) or Blåvitt, is a Swedish professional football club based in Gothenburg. Founded in 1904, it is the only club in the Nordic countries that has won one of the main UEFA competitions, having won the UEFA Cup in both 1982 and 1987. IFK is affiliated with Göteborgs Fotbollförbund and play their home games at Gamla Ullevi. The club colours are blue and white, colours shared both with the sports society which the club originated from, Idrottsföreningen Kamraterna, and with the coat of arms of the city of Gothenburg. The team colours have influenced the historical nickname Blåvitt.

Besides the two UEFA Cup titles, IFK have won 18 Swedish championship titles, second most in Swedish football after Malmö FF, and have the second most national cup titles with eight. The team has qualified for four group stages of the UEFA Champions League, and reached the semi-finals of the 1985–86 European Cup. IFK Göteborg is the only club team in any sport to have won the Jerring Award, an award for best Swedish sports performance of the year voted by the Swedish people, for the 1982 UEFA Cup victory.

IFK Göteborg play in the highest Swedish league, Allsvenskan, where they have played for the majority of their history. They have played in the Swedish first tier continuously since 1977, which is the longest ongoing top-flight tenure in Sweden. The club won its first Swedish championship in 1908, four years after the founding, and has won at least one championship title in every decade since, except the 1920s, 1970s and 2010s. IFK Göteborg's most successful period was from 1982 to 1996, when the team prospered in European football and won 10 out of 15 Swedish championships.

== History ==
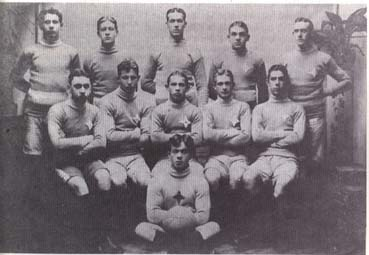
The IFK Göteborg squad in the year 1905.

IFK Göteborg was founded on 4 October 1904, at Café Olivedal in the Annedal district of Linnéstaden in downtown Gothenburg. It was the third, but the only remaining, IFK association founded in Gothenburg, becoming the 39th overall. A committee for football was created at the historic first meeting; the association's first football match ended in a 4–1 victory against another club from the area, IK Viking. The foundation of IFK Göteborg was important for the development of football in the city, as until that point, Örgryte IS, the largest of Gothenburg clubs, were dominant, with IFK Göteborg offering some needed competition.

In 1907, IFK Göteborg became the first Swedish team in four years to beat Örgryte IS. They then went on to win their first Swedish Championship in 1908 by winning the cup tournament Svenska Mästerskapet, and three players from the club were selected to play for Sweden in the national team's first match. That year IFK played teams from outside Sweden for the first time, meeting the Danish clubs Østerbro BK and Boldklubben af 1893.

In 1910, the team played in blue and white striped jerseys for the first time. Two years later the team drew 1–1 in a game against the 1912 Swedish Olympic team, and the newspapers in Stockholm nominated IFK Göteborg as "the best Swedish football club ever". IFK Göteborg won Svenska Serien, the highest Swedish league at the time, but not the Swedish Championship deciding competition, for the fifth time in a row in 1917. The early IFK Göteborg team had no trainer; the club gained its first such official in 1921, when Hungarian manager Sándor Bródy was hired. Bródy was appointed manager for IFK two years later. The first Swedish official national league, Allsvenskan, started in late 1924, the year the legendary Filip Johansson made his debut for IFK Göteborg. The club finished second, but Johansson scored 39 goals in 22 games and was the league's top goalscorer.

A chart showing the progress of IFK Göteborg through the Swedish football league system. The different shades of grey represent league divisions.

IFK won their first Allsvenskan title in 1934–35, the ten previous seasons of the league saw the club finish in the top four. Swedish football was dominated by teams from Gothenburg during these years, but IFK Göteborg were surprisingly relegated in 1937–38, although the team was promoted back to Allsvenskan the next season. Back in the highest division, IFK finished second, with the league continuing despite the outbreak of World War II. IFK won another title in 1941–42 with a strong team, but the rest of the decade saw mixed results. The 1940s team included the talented Gunnar Gren, who became the top scorer in 1946–47. He was also awarded Guldbollen as the best player in Sweden, and won an Olympic gold medal with the Swedish team at the 1948 Olympics. When Gren left in 1949, IFK were relegated from Allsvenskan the following season. As happened the last time IFK played in a lower league, they were promoted directly back to Allsvenskan after one season in Division 2. IFK went on to compete in a European Cup, the European Champion Clubs' Cup, for the first time in 1958, but were eliminated in the second round by SC Wismut. In 1959, the all-time Allsvenskan record attendance of 52,194 was set when IFK played Örgryte IS at Nya Ullevi.

After an unglamorous decade, IFK were led by manager and retired footballer Bertil Johansson to a surprising championship title in 1969. The following season was one of the darkest in their history. IFK were relegated, and unlike previous relegations they did not make an immediate return. After three seasons in the second league IFK had lost all signs of being a team from Allsvenskan, and had still not managed to gain promotion. But after hard work from board member Anders Bernmar and others to get the club on the right track, IFK were promoted to Allsvenskan in 1976. In 1979, IFK hired Sven-Göran Eriksson as manager. He introduced the 4–4–2 system with "pressure and support", called the Swenglish model, which would give IFK great success later on, and his first season at the club ended with a second place in Allsvenskan and the club's first gold medal in Svenska Cupen.

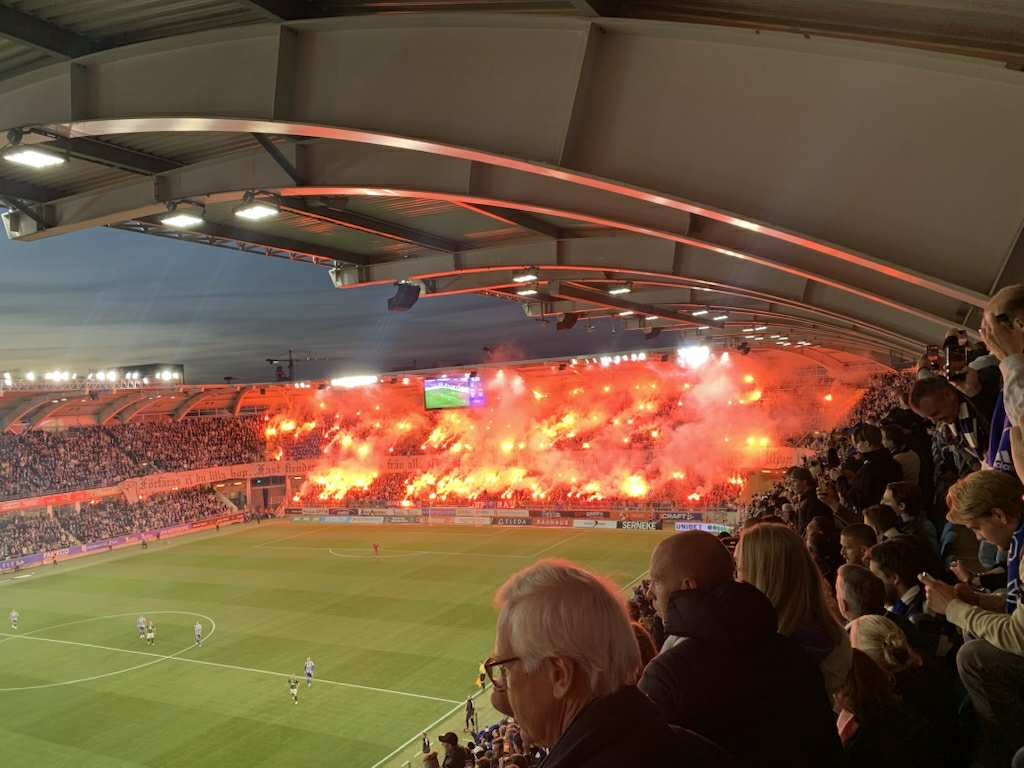
IFK Göteborgs fans in a game against GAIS in 2024

After reinforcing the team with several expensive players, including Thomas Wernerson and Stig Fredriksson, IFK had finished second in the league and reached the quarter-finals in the UEFA Cup as 1981 came to an end. 1982 then became a turbulent season as the whole board was replaced and the club almost went bankrupt, even needing to borrow money from the official supporter's association to travel to Valencia to play the quarter-final of the UEFA Cup. After the troubled start IFK won every competition they entered, including Allsvenskan, the Allsvenskan play-off, Svenska Cupen, and the UEFA Cup, defeating Hamburger SV 4–0 on aggregate in the finals. During the following 15 years the club was the leading club in Swedish football, winning the Swedish championship ten times, the domestic cup three times and the UEFA Cup twice.

IFK managed to field a strong team for a couple of years and won gold in the league in both 1983 and 1984, and the cup in 1983. In 1986, the team reached the semi-finals of the European Cup but were defeated on penalties against FC Barcelona. A new team of talents won both the UEFA Cup and Allsvenskan once again in 1987, after beating Dundee United in the UEFA Cup final. The youth manager Roger Gustafsson took over the team from Gunder Bengtsson in 1990, and his time with IFK was to become very successful, winning Allsvenskan five times between 1990 and 1995.

As IFK won the 1993 Allsvenskan, they qualified for European competition. IFK advanced to the group stage of the Champions League, where they faced FC Barcelona, Manchester United and Galatasaray. Elimination at the group stage was widely anticipated, but IFK Göteborg confounded expectations by winning the group and advancing to the knockout stage. However, IFK Göteborg was eliminated in the quarter-finals by Bayern Munich on away goals.

The last years before the new millennium were disappointing for IFK, providing a stark contrast to the earlier success. The team only managed a silver in 1997 and an eighth place in 1998, after buying several expensive players who failed to produce. In both 1998 and 1999 IFK changed managers mid-season, something which had previously never happened in the club's history. The last year of the decade ended with a sixth-place finish. The new millennium offered varied results, with the club playing a relegation play-off in 2002, but challenging for the championship in 2001, 2004, and 2005. In 2007, the first title in eleven years was secured in the last round of Allsvenskan. The club then won the national cup Svenska Cupen the next season. IFK Göteborg are still considered to be one of the "Big Three" in Swedish football, along with Malmö FF and AIK, despite only having won the Allsvenskan title once during the last 20 years.

== Colours, crest and sponsorship ==
=== Colours and kit ===
The traditional colours of all IFK associations are blue and white, and IFK Göteborg is no exception. Soon after the club's foundation in 1904, it was decided that the kit should consist of a blue and white striped shirt with blue shorts. But the design was too costly and instead a cheaper alternative was used. Thus the club's first kit used a blue shirt with a single horizontal white stripe and a four-pointed star, one of the IFK association symbols, in white on the chest. During the next few years, white or blue shirts without stripes were used. In 1910, a kit comprising a blue and white vertically striped shirt and blue shorts was used for the first time inspired by the kit of Kjøbenhavns Boldklub. This kit has remained as the home colours ever since. The small amount of sponsor logos, together with the longtime use of blue and white stripes, has made the kit a classic in Swedish football. The most common away kit has been red and white in different styles, though other colour combinations, for example orange and white, have been used, mainly in the 1990s and 2000s. The away kit introduced in 2005 once again used red and white. An almost completely white third kit with blue details was introduced in mid-2007 after requests from supporters. In the 2010s, the away-kit colours have seen much variation, including a pink shirt with black shorts, a black kit with light-grey details, the more traditional red kit with white trimmings, and a purple kit with white details introduced in 2016.

Home kit used for the 1904–05 seasons.
Home kit used for the 1906 season.
Home kit used for the 1907–09 seasons.
Home kit used since the 1910 season with only minor variations.

=== Crest ===
Crest first used in 1919

The crest of IFK Göteborg has its origins in the coat of arms of the city of Gothenburg which in turn is based on several other heraldic arms. The lion on a field of silver and blue is the heraldic arms of the House of Bjälbo, and the lion holds the Three Crowns of Sweden, both symbols being used in the coat of arms of Sweden. This arms was granted to Gothenburg by Gustavus Adolphus. The coat of arms of the city sees the lion facing the sinister (heraldic left, which is viewer's right) side which often is interpreted as a fleeing lion, the normal being a lion facing the dexter (heraldic right) side, and IFK chose to use the latter on the club crest. Finally the three letters IFK were added on top. This crest has been used since it first appeared on the kit in 1919. These main elements have not been modified since then, but during the years several different designs of the crest have been used, occasionally having the lion facing the sinister side. In the early 1980s, the club standardised the design and only minor changes, such as element colours and different hues, have been made since then, with the exception of the years 1997–1999 when IFK, with Reebok as kit sponsors, used a crest with some more distinct changes to the standard elements. Details of the crest were slightly updated in 2020 to increase visibility and clarity, and the blue colour was modified. The new blue colour is the result of analysing different blue hues used in home kits from the last 40 years, and selecting the mean colour value. Before 1919 various other symbols were used, with the four-pointed star of the IFK associations featuring on the shirts until 1910.

Note: when the lion of the coat of arms of Gothenburg is mirrored in the IFK Göteborg crest, it unheraldically holds a shield in its right hand and a sword in its left hand.

=== Sponsorship ===
Kappa is the club's kit manufacturer since 2016, replacing Adidas, who had supplied the kit for a majority of the seasons since the 1970s.

Apart from the Kappa brand, IFK Göteborg has the logos of the following companies visible on their shirt and shorts: Serneke, a construction company; Elkontakt, an electrical contractor; Morris Law, a law firm; Atea, an IT-infrastructure company; Länsförsäkringar, an insurance company and bank; Rasta, a chain of road restaurants and motels; German automakers Volkswagen; and league sponsors Svenska Spel, a government-owned gambling company.

Serneke replaced Prioritet Finans as the main shirt sponsor before the 2019 season, becoming the third main sponsor in the club's history. The grocery-store chain ICA had sponsored IFK Göteborg since 1974, and their logo was displayed on the chest of the shirt 1980–2010, leading some to consider it an integral part of the shirt. The ICA logo was reproduced in its original red colour for the first few years, but was then changed to a blue-and-white version to better blend with the kit colours.

Period	Kit manufacturer	Shirt sponsor
1977–78	Adidas	None
1979	Admiral	None
1980	Admiral	ICA
1981–92	Adidas	ICA
1993–96	ASICS	ICA
1997–99	Reebok	ICA
2000–10	Adidas	ICA
2011–14	Adidas	Prioritet Finans
2015	Adidas	None (Note: First half of the season.)
2015	Adidas	Prioritet Finans
2016–18	Kappa	Prioritet Finans
2019	Kappa	Serneke
2020–	Craft	Serneke

== Facilities and stadiums ==
=== Facilities ===
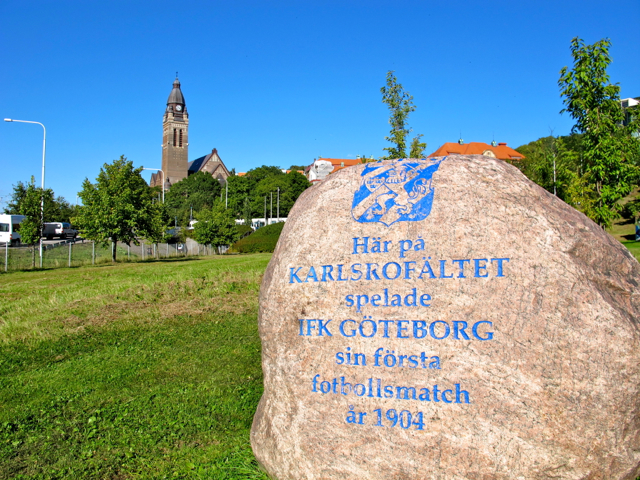
The memorial stone at Karlsrofältet.

IFK Göteborg played its first match, a training match between the first and second team of the club, at Karlsrofältet. A memorial stone with the caption "Here at Karlsrofältet, IFK Göteborg played their first ever football match in the year 1904" (Swedish: "Här på Karlsrofältet spelade IFK Göteborg sin första fotbollsmatch år 1904") has been raised by the field to commemorate the event. Karlsrofältet was mainly used as a training pitch in the early years of the club, until IFK stopped using the field completely in 1910.

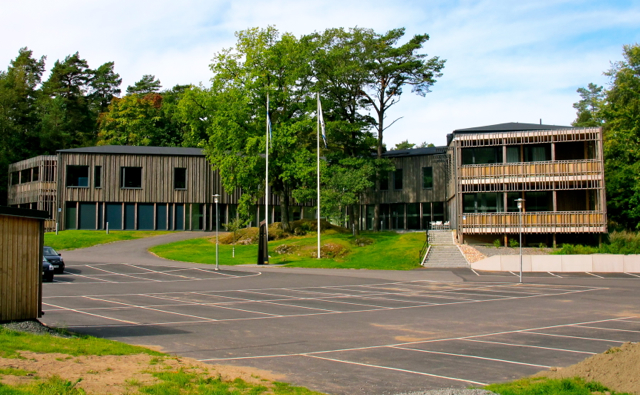
Overview of Kamratgården.

Between 1946 and 1964, IFK's clubhouse was Lilla Sjödala, located in Pixbo, Mölnlycke, just outside Gothenburg. The house was mostly used by the club's orienteering and athletics departments. On 1 October 1961, a new 220 square metres (2,400 sq ft) complex, Kamratgården, was officially opened near Delsjön. A number of additions were made over the years, and by 2004 the floor area of Kamratgården had grown to 1,200 square metres (13,000 sq ft), a nearby indoor hall and two full-size grass pitches. The buildings were demolished in February 2011, and a new modern facility was opened on 18 March 2012, housing an administrative and sports area on two floors and 2,000 square metres (22,000 sq ft).

The football academy of IFK Göteborg as well as Änglagårdsskolan, an elementary school affiliated with IFK, are housed at Prioritet Serneke Arena, a multi-sport complex in the district of Kviberg. The indoor full-size football pitch at Prioritet Serneke Arena is also, on occasion, used for first-team friendly matches.

=== Stadiums ===
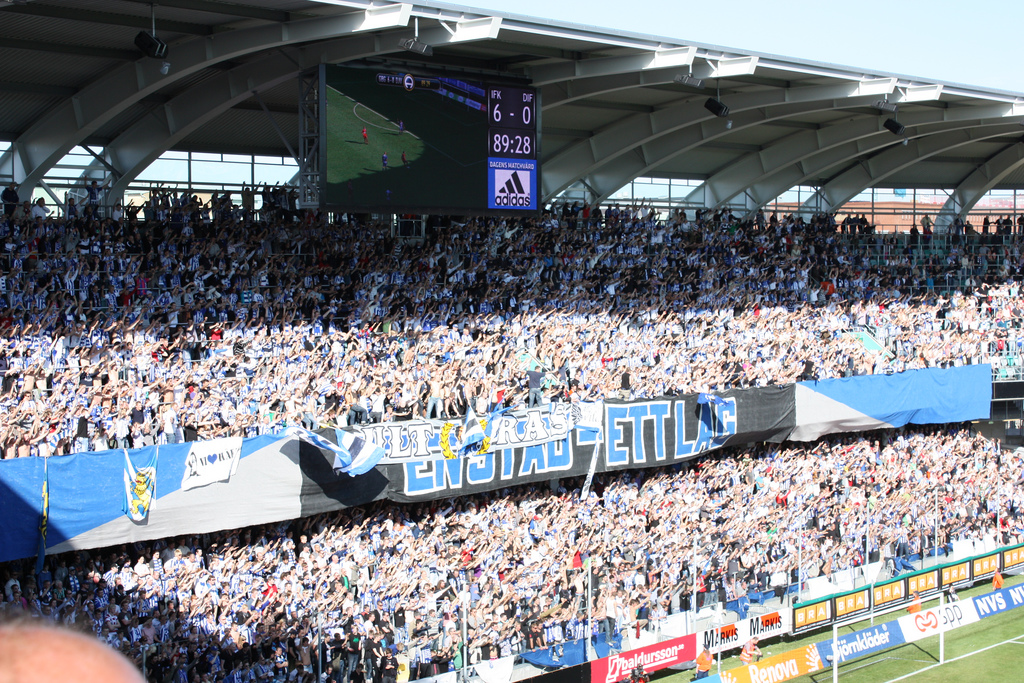
IFK Göteborg's first match (11 April 2009) at the new stadium Gamla Ullevi, a match which IFK won 6–0 against Djurgårdens IF.

Historically, IFK Göteborg's main home stadium has been Gamla Ullevi, where the majority of the competitive games have been played. The club has played there in two separate periods, most recently after leaving Ullevi (Nya Ullevi) in 1992, although matches attracting large crowds, such as derbies against the rivals Örgryte IS and GAIS, or international games, were still played at the larger Ullevi stadium. Gamla Ullevi's capacity was 18,000 when used in the 1990s and 2000s, while Nya Ullevi has a capacity of 43,200.

Gamla Ullevi was demolished on 9 January 2007 to make place for a new stadium with the same name, Gamla Ullevi, with a capacity of 18,800. The new stadium was completed in late 2008, but not opened until the start of the 2009 season. During construction, IFK Göteborg played the 2007 and 2008 seasons at Nya Ullevi. On 11 April 2009 IFK Göteborg played their first game on the new Gamla Ullevi stadium and won against Djurgården with 6–0 in front of 18,276 spectators.

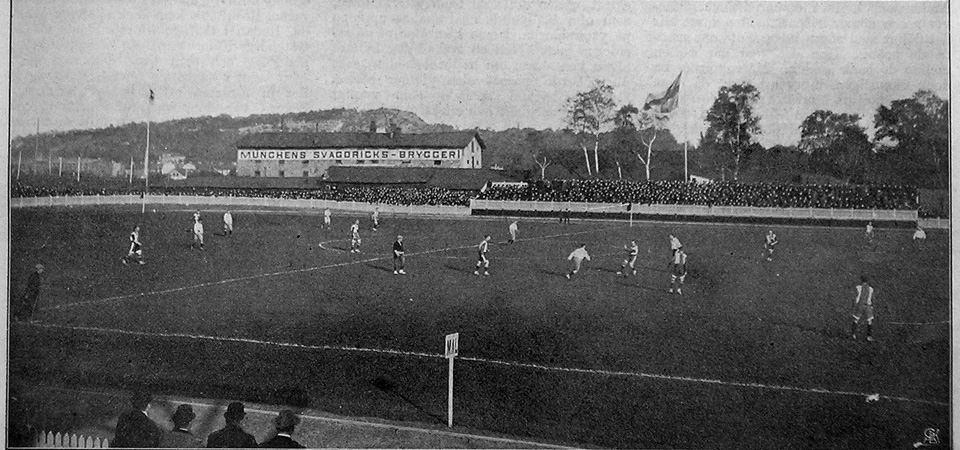
Walhalla IP during the 1908 Svenska Mästerskapet Final between IFK Göteborg and IFK Uppsala.

IFK Göteborg have used three other stadia as official home grounds. The first ground was Idrottsplatsen, in use from 1905 to 1915. It was built in 1896 for the cycling club Göteborgs Velocipedklubb, and was originally used for track cycling. During the 1909 season IFK Göteborg also used Örgryte's then home ground, Balders Hage, due to a conflict with the owners of Idrottsplatsen. The third official stadium was Walhalla Idrottsplats, used for a number of home matches at the same time as Idrottsplatsen. A fourth ground, Slottsskogsvallen, has never been the official home ground, but has nonetheless been used a number of times for IFK Göteborg home matches.

Idrottsplatsen fell into decline due to poor leadership and a troubled economy in the 1910s, and a decision was made to completely renovate the arena with the help of outside sponsorship and funding. The construction of the new football ground was started in 1915 and used the site of Idrottsplatsen as foundation. The new stadium, originally named Ullervi, but later changed to Ullevi and finally Gamla Ullevi, was opened in 1916. It was the home ground of IFK Göteborg until 1958, when Nya Ullevi, built for the 1958 World Cup held in Sweden, was opened. Due to a number of seasons with low attendance in Swedish football in the late 1980s and early 1990s, a move back to Gamla Ullevi was made in 1992.

== Supporters and club relationships ==
=== Supporters ===
Before the foundation of IFK Göteborg, the dominant club in the Gothenburg area was Örgryte IS, which was considered a middle and upper class club. IFK became popular among the working class, creating a fierce rivalry based upon both local pride and social class. In the early 20th century, supporters were supposed to act as gentlemen, applauding and supporting both their own team, and the opponents. However, this proved a hard task for supporters of the Gothenburg teams. Local patriotism and class differences sometimes resulted in fights and pitch invasions, making the Swedish press view IFK and Örgryte fans as the scum of Swedish football.

After World War I, the rivalry calmed, and Gothenburg supporters became known as friendly and sportsmanlike fans. However, this only applied to the behaviour on home ground, as IFK supporters continued to behave badly when travelling to away matches by train (called Göteborgstågen, the Gothenburg trains), a phenomenon that grew quickly in the 1920s. This behaviour peaked in 1939, just after the outbreak of World War II, when approximately 1,900 IFK fans travelled to Borås to see IFK play Elfsborg. After a 2–3 loss, the fans fought with the Borås police, before returning home to Gothenburg and disturbing a wartime blackout exercise.

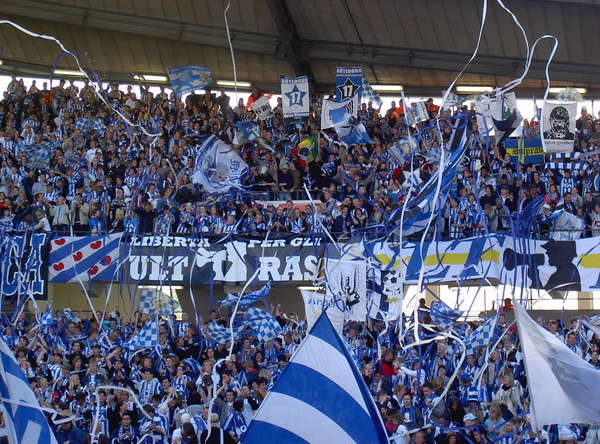
IFK Göteborg supporters at the home derby against Örgryte IS in 2005.

As in most other parts of the world, the decades following the World War II were relatively free from football violence and the supporter culture did not change much. Swedish football culture started to change in the late 1960s, becoming heavily inspired and influenced by the English supporter culture. This flourished in the 1970s and 1980s, giving birth to some of the most well-known Swedish supporters clubs, AIK's Black Army, Djurgårdens IF's Blue Saints (later Järnkaminerna), and IFK Göteborg's supporters club, Änglarna (the Angels). The first attempt to found an IFK supporters club was made in 1969, but interest diminished when IFK Göteborg were relegated from the highest league the following year. The supporters club was not re-founded until 1973, which is considered the year of foundation of Änglarna.

As the club gained success in European club tournaments in the 1980s and 1990s, and thousands of IFK fans travelled to Hamburg, Barcelona, Dundee, Milan, Manchester and Munich, the supporters gained influence on the club, for example by lending money to the almost bankrupt IFK Göteborg so the team could go to Valencia to play the quarter-final in the UEFA Cup in 1982, or by being the main force behind the move back to Gamla Ullevi in 1992. The early 1990s saw a downward trend in attendance numbers, even though the club was successful on the pitch, but the trend turned in the later years of the decade and the first few years of the new millennium brought the club's highest average attendance since the early 1980s.

In the 2000s, supporter culture in Sweden started to shift from being English-influenced to being more influenced by the Southern European countries and their football culture, making tifos and ultras a common sight in Swedish arenas. From acting as an almost uniform group of fans gathered under the same flag, (Änglarna), IFK fans created separate supporter factions, including Ultra Bulldogs, Young Lions and West Coast Angelz. IFK is the most popular football club in Sweden; a 2004 survey concluded that IFK Göteborg had support from 13% of Swedish football fans, and surveys in 2016 and 2017 again confirmed that IFK was the most popular club in Sweden, with a support of 10%. A majority, 51%, of football fans in Gothenburg support IFK, and the club is the fourth most popular in Stockholm (after AIK, Djurgårdens IF and Hammarby IF) and the second most popular in Malmö, after Malmö FF.

Since 2009, the club's entrance music is "Snart skiner Poseidon" ("Soon Poseidon will shine"), referring to one of Gothenburg's landmarks, Poseidon med brunnskar, a bronze statue created by Carl Milles. The song was written by singer-songwriter Joel Alme.

=== Club relationships ===
IFK Göteborg is part of Göteborgsalliansen, an alliance including two other major teams from Gothenburg: GAIS and Örgryte IS. Besides arranging tournaments, they together hosted big games in which the best players from each club represented the side. In 2015, IFK announced a partnership with Utsiktens BK, an agreement involving IFK's players to be loaned out to the club for first team experience. The supporter group Ultras Göteborg have a supporter friendship with Ultras Nürnberg, fans of the German football club 1. FC Nürnberg.

== Players ==
=== First-team squad ===
As of 3 September 2026

Note: Flags indicate national team as defined under FIFA eligibility rules; some limited exceptions apply. Players may hold more than one non-FIFA nationality.

No.	Pos.	Nation	Player
1	GK	NOR	Jonathan Rasheed
3	DF	SWE	August Erlingmark (captain)
4	MF	SWE	Kevin Ackermann
5	DF	DEN	Jonas Bager
6	DF	ISL	Hjörtur Hermannsson
7	FW	DEN	Alexander Simmelhack
8	FW	SWE	Sam Larsson (3rd captain)
9	FW	DEN	Max Fenger
10	MF	SWE	Ramon Pascal Lundqvist
11	FW	SLO	Nino Žugelj (on loan from Djurgårdens IF)
12	GK	SWE	Viktor Andersson (on loan from IFK Värnamo)
14	FW	NOR	Tobias Heintz (vice-captain)
15	MF	DEN	David Kruse
17	DF	SWE	Alexander Jallow

No.	Pos.	Nation	Player
18	DF	SWE	Felix Eriksson
19	FW	ALB	Arbnor Muçolli
20	DF	SWE	Gabriel Ersoy
21	MF	SWE	Leo Radaković
22	DF	SWE	Noah Tolf
23	MF	ISL	Kolbeinn Þórðarson
24	MF	SWE	Oliver Månsson
25	GK	SWE	Elis Bishesari
26	DF	SWE	Emil Fasth (Note: Included on a loan list with FC Trollhättan, meaning he is available for both clubs during the season.)
27	FW	SWE	Alfons Borén (Note: Included on a loan list with Ljungskile SK, meaning he is available for both clubs during the season.)
28	DF	GHA	Issaka Seidu (on loan from FC Nordsjælland)
29	FW	SWE	Adam Bergmark Wiberg
30	FW	CAN	Tiago Coimbra

=== Out on loan ===
As of 1 September 2026

Note: Flags indicate national team as defined under FIFA eligibility rules; some limited exceptions apply. Players may hold more than one non-FIFA nationality.

No. / Pos. / Nation / Player; 16 / MF / SWE / Filip Ottosson (at Lillestrøm SK until 31 January 2027)	No. / Pos. / Nation / Player; — / MF / SWE / Imam Jagne (at A.E. Kifisia until 30 June 2027)

=== Youth players with first-team experience ===
As of 9 October 2026 (Note: Current youth players who have sat on the bench in at least one competitive match, or are part of the top talent group.)

Note: Flags indicate national team as defined under FIFA eligibility rules; some limited exceptions apply. Players may hold more than one non-FIFA nationality.

No.	Pos.	Nation	Player
31	GK	SWE	Alexander Carlsson (Note: Included on a loan list with Falkenbergs FF, meaning he is available for both clubs during the season.)
33	DF	SWE	Rasmus Nåfors Dahlin
35	MF	SWE	Natanael Lundén
—	GK	SWE	William Anttonen

No.	Pos.	Nation	Player
—	MF	SWE	Freddie Lantz (Note: Included on a loan list with IK Oddevold, meaning he is available for both clubs during the season.)
—	MF	NGR	Ifeoluwa Olowoporoku
—	FW	SSD	Peter Lazarus

=== Notable players ===
As of 25 February 2024

The all-star team chosen by Göteborgs-Posten readers in 2004.

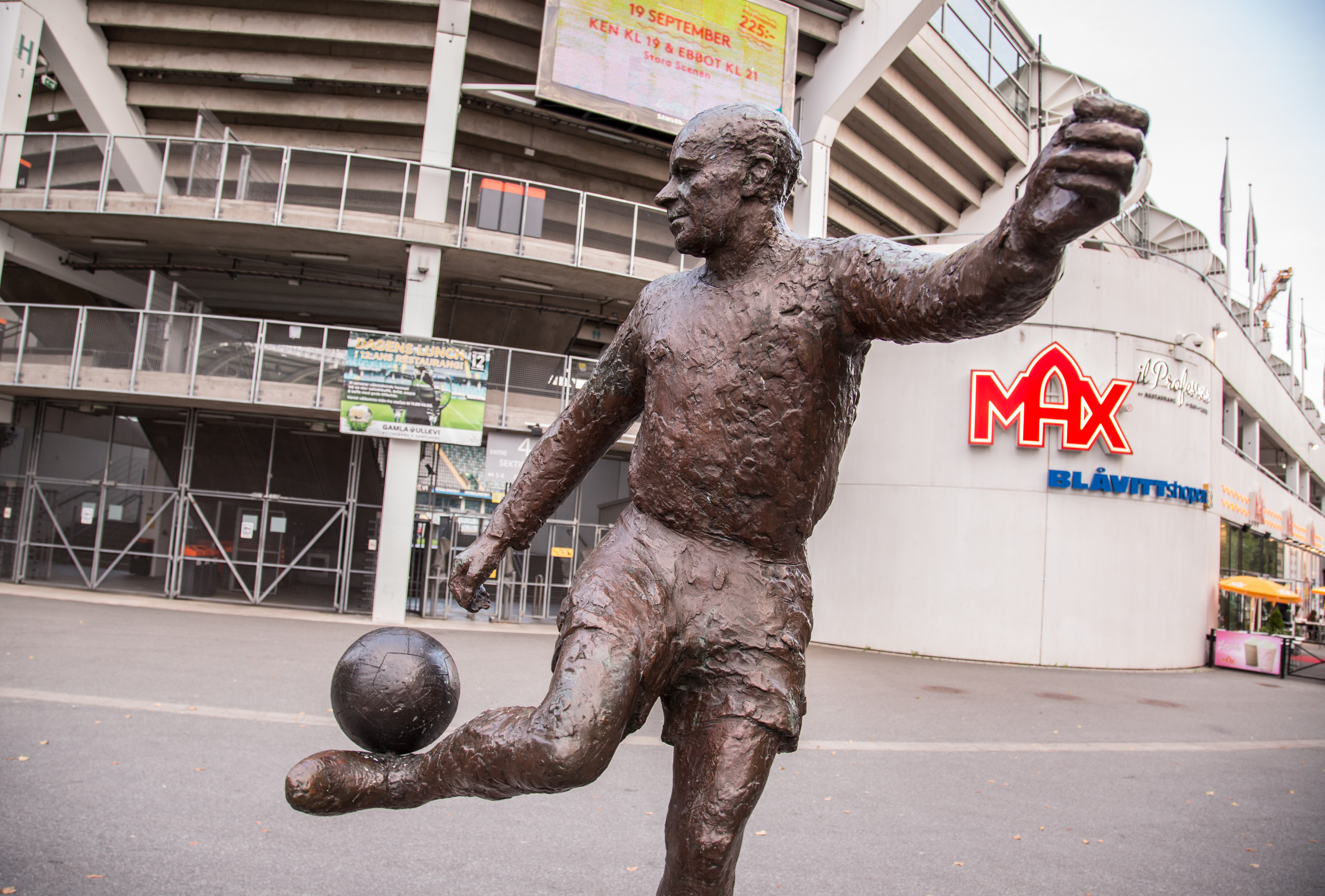
Gunnar Gren, playing for IFK Göteborg between 1941 and 1949, has been honoured by a statue outside Gamla Ullevi.

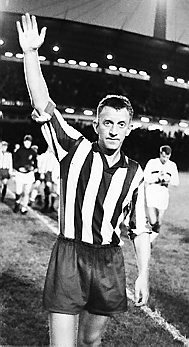
Bertil Johansson scored 162 goals in 268 league games for IFK Göteborg between 1955 and 1968.

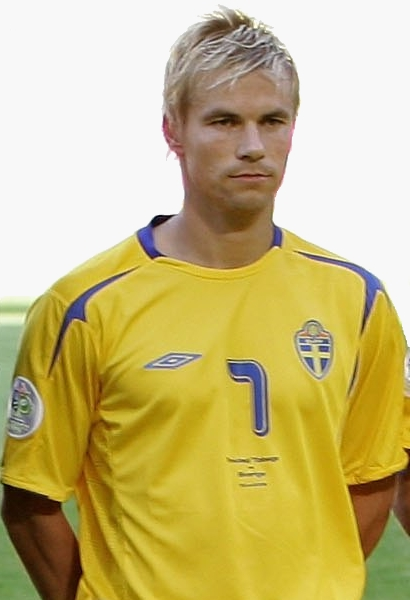
Niclas Alexandersson has played 109 matches for the national team and has won two Swedish championships with IFK Göteborg.

The following players fulfill one or more of these four criteria:

1. Have been voted for the greatest ever IFK Göteborg team in a 2004 poll by readers of the regional newspaper Göteborgs-Posten (11 players).
2. Have been chosen for the dream team presented in the club's official 100-year jubilee book published in 2004 (11 players).
3. Have been portrayed in the 1997 all-star team book "Alla tiders Blåvitt" (11 players and 5 substitutes).
4. Have gained more than 80 caps for their national team (10 players).

Name	Position	IFK Göteborg career (Note: Career years only include years with competitive matches.)	League record (Note: "League" matches includes Svenska Serien, Fyrkantserien, Allsvenskan, Mästerskapsserien and Division 2 matches as well as qualification and play-off matches.)		Criteria			
Name	Position	IFK Göteborg career	Matches	Goals	1.	2.	3.	4.
(Sweden) Erik Börjesson	Forward	1907–1910; 1912–1920	64	83		x		
(Sweden) Filip Johansson	Forward	1924–1932	181	180	x	x		
(Sweden) Arne Nyberg	Forward	1932–1950	297	131		x		
(Sweden) Gunnar Gren	Forward	1941–1949	164	78	x		x	
(Sweden) Bengt Berndtsson	Forward	1951–1967	348	69	x	x	x	
(Sweden) Bertil Johansson	Forward	1955–1968	268	162	x	x	x	
(Sweden) Donald Niklasson	Defender	1967–1977	189	12		x		
(Sweden) Björn Nordqvist	Defender	1975–1978	83	2				x
(Sweden) Torbjörn Nilsson	Forward	1975–1976; 1977–1982; 1984–1986	212	127	x	x	x	
(Sweden) Tord Holmgren	Midfielder	1977–1987	245	26			x	
(Sweden) Tommy Holmgren	Midfielder; Forward	1978–1989	242	20		x	x	
(Sweden) Ruben Svensson	Defender	1978–1986	195	23	x		(x)	
(Sweden) Glenn Strömberg	Midfielder	1979–1982	97	9	x		x	
(Sweden) Glenn Hysén	Defender	1979–1983; 1985–1987	155	13	x		x	
(Sweden) Stig Fredriksson	Defender	1981–1987	179	16	x		x	
(Sweden) Thomas Wernerson	Goalkeeper	1981–1987	181	0			(x)	
(Sweden) Roland Nilsson	Defender	1983–1989	124	7				x
(Sweden) Peter Larsson	Defender	1984–1987	101	13			x	
(Sweden) Stefan Pettersson	Forward	1984–1988; 1994–1998	162	58			(x)	
(Norway) Erik Thorstvedt	Goalkeeper	1988	24	0				x
(Sweden) Kennet Andersson	Forward	1989–1991	63	29				x
(Sweden) Thomas Ravelli	Goalkeeper	1989–1997	211	0	x	x	x	x
(Sweden) Stefan Rehn	Midfielder	1990–1995	138	28			(x)	
(Sweden) Håkan Mild	Midfielder	1990–1993; 1995–1996; 1998–2001; 2002–2005	252	26		x		
(Sweden) Jesper Blomqvist	Midfielder	1993–1996	73	18			(x)	
(Sweden) Magnus Erlingmark	Defender; Midfielder; Forward	1993–2004	280	43	x	x		
(Sweden) Teddy Lučić	Defender	1996–1998	58	2				x
(Sweden) Niclas Alexandersson	Midfielder	1996–1997; 2004–2008; 2009	176	32				x
(Sweden) Marcus Berg	Forward	2005–2007; 2021–2023	118	51				x
(Iceland) Ragnar Sigurðsson	Defender	2007–2011	125	12				x
(Slovakia) Marek Hamšík	Midfielder	2021	6	1				x

=== Supporters' player of the year ===
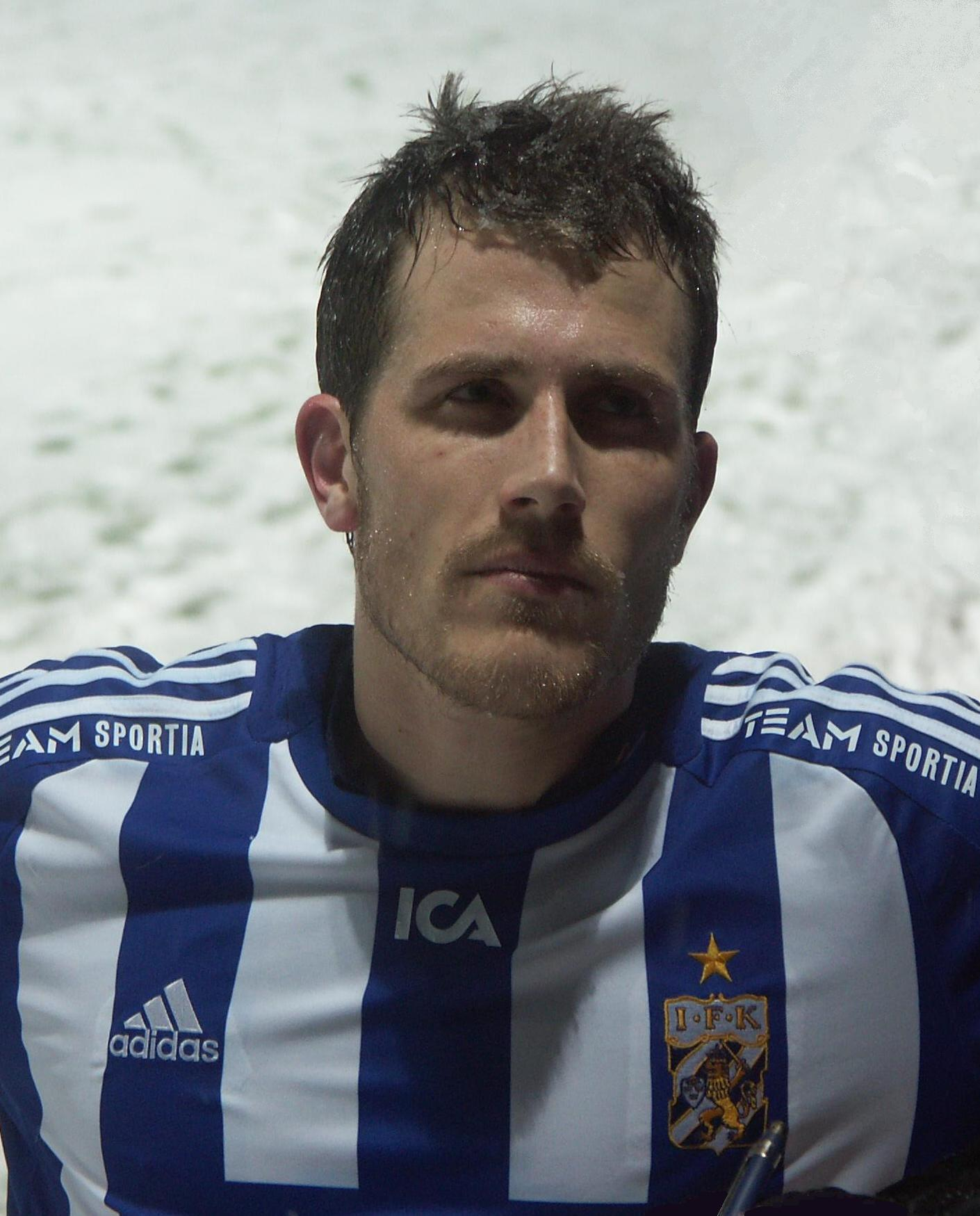
Tobias Hysén in a pre-season friendly in 2009, later that year was awarded the "Ärkeängeln" honorary prize.

The supporters' club Supporterklubben Änglarna award the honorary prize "Ärkeängeln" ("The Archangel") to a player for their great loyalty and sporting merits each year since 1973, the prize can only be won once. The following recipients have been decided by board vote until 1982 and by member vote since 1983. Since 2023, players in the women's team are eligible as well.

1973 – (Sweden) Reine Feldt
1974 – (Sweden) Jan Nordström
1975 – (Sweden) Conny Karlsson
1976 – (Sweden) Reine Olausson
1977 – (Sweden) Björn Nordqvist
1978 – (Sweden) Reine Almqvist
1979 – (Sweden) Torbjörn Nilsson
1980 – (Sweden) Tord Holmgren
1981 – (Sweden) Glenn Hysén
1982 – (Sweden) Ruben Svensson
1983 – (Sweden) Jerry Carlsson
1984 – (Sweden) Stig Fredriksson
1985 – (Sweden) Thomas Wernerson
1986 – (Sweden) Tommy Holmgren
1987 – (Sweden) Stefan Pettersson
1988 – (Sweden) Roland Nilsson
1989 – (Sweden) Magnus "Lill-Tidan" Johansson
1990 – (Sweden) Ola Svensson
1991 – (Sweden) Thomas Ravelli
1992 – (Sweden) Johnny Ekström
1993 – (Sweden) Peter Eriksson
1994 – (Sweden) Mikael Nilsson
1995 – (Sweden) Jonas Olsson
1996 – (Sweden) Stefan Lindqvist
1997 – (Sweden) Magnus Erlingmark
1998 – (Sweden) Mikael Martinsson
1999 – (Sweden) Håkan Mild
2000 – (Sweden) Stefan Landberg
2001 – (Sweden) Bengt Andersson
2002 – (Sweden) Tomas Rosenkvist
2003 – (Sweden) Mikael Antonsson
2004 – (Sweden) Niclas Alexandersson
2005 – (Sweden) Magnus "Ölme" Johansson
2006 – (Sweden) Dennis Jonsson
2007 – (Iceland) Hjálmar Jónsson
2008 – (Sweden) Stefan Selaković
2009 – (Sweden) Tobias Hysén
2010 – (Iceland) Ragnar Sigurðsson
2011 – (Sweden) Thomas Olsson
2012 – (Sweden) Jakob Johansson
2013 – (Sweden) Hannes Stiller
2014 – (Sweden) Emil Salomonsson
2015 – (Sweden) John Alvbåge
2016 – (Bolivia) Martin Smedberg-Dalence
2017 – (Sweden) Sebastian Eriksson
2018 – (Sweden) Robin Söder
2019 – (Denmark) Lasse Vibe
2020 – (Sweden) Mattias Bjärsmyr
2021 – (Sweden) Tobias Sana
2022 – (Sweden) Marcus Berg
2023 – (Sweden) Gustav Svensson
2024 – (Sweden) Leia Molund (Note: Awarded to a player in the women's team.)
2025 – (Iceland) Kolbeinn Þórðarson

== Management ==
=== Board ===
As of 10 March 2026

Role	Name
Chairman	(Sweden) Magnus Nilsson
Vice chairman	(Sweden) Teresa Utković
Secretary	(Sweden) Lars Dahlström
Board members	(Sweden) Sofia Bohlin
Board members	(Sweden) Philip Haglund
Board members	(Sweden) Andrej Häggblad Hristov
Board members	(Sweden) Jessica Nauckhoff
Board members	(Sweden) Rickard Ärlig
Board members	(Sweden) Ingalill Östman

=== Organisation ===
As of 6 July 2026

Role	Name
Club director	(Sweden) Nicklas Lauwell
Operations manager	(Sweden) Sofia Hultberg
Financial manager	(Sweden) Martina Sjögren
Communications manager	(Sweden) Marcus Modéer
Head of football	(Sweden) Jesper Jansson
Technical manager	(Sweden) Magnus Edlund
Director of youth academy	(Sweden) Jonas Olsson

=== Technical staff ===
As of 2 July 2026

Role	Name
Head coach	(Sweden) Joachim Björklund
Assistant coaches	(Sweden) Marcus Berg
Assistant coaches	(Sweden) Oscar Wendt
Goalkeeping coach	(Scotland) Lee Baxter
Analyst	(Sweden) Liam Wohlén
Scout	(Sweden) David Vuković
Sports coordinator	(Sweden) Samuel Yngvesson
Strength and conditioning coach	(England) Hakeem Araba
Physiotherapist	(Sweden) Kaj Leuther
Equipment managers	(Sweden) Eva Qvistgaard
Equipment managers	(Sweden) Rolf Gustavsson

=== Notable managers ===
The following 15 managers either have won at least one major honour with IFK Göteborg or have managed the team for 100 or more league matches. The managers are listed according to when they were first appointed manager for IFK Göteborg.

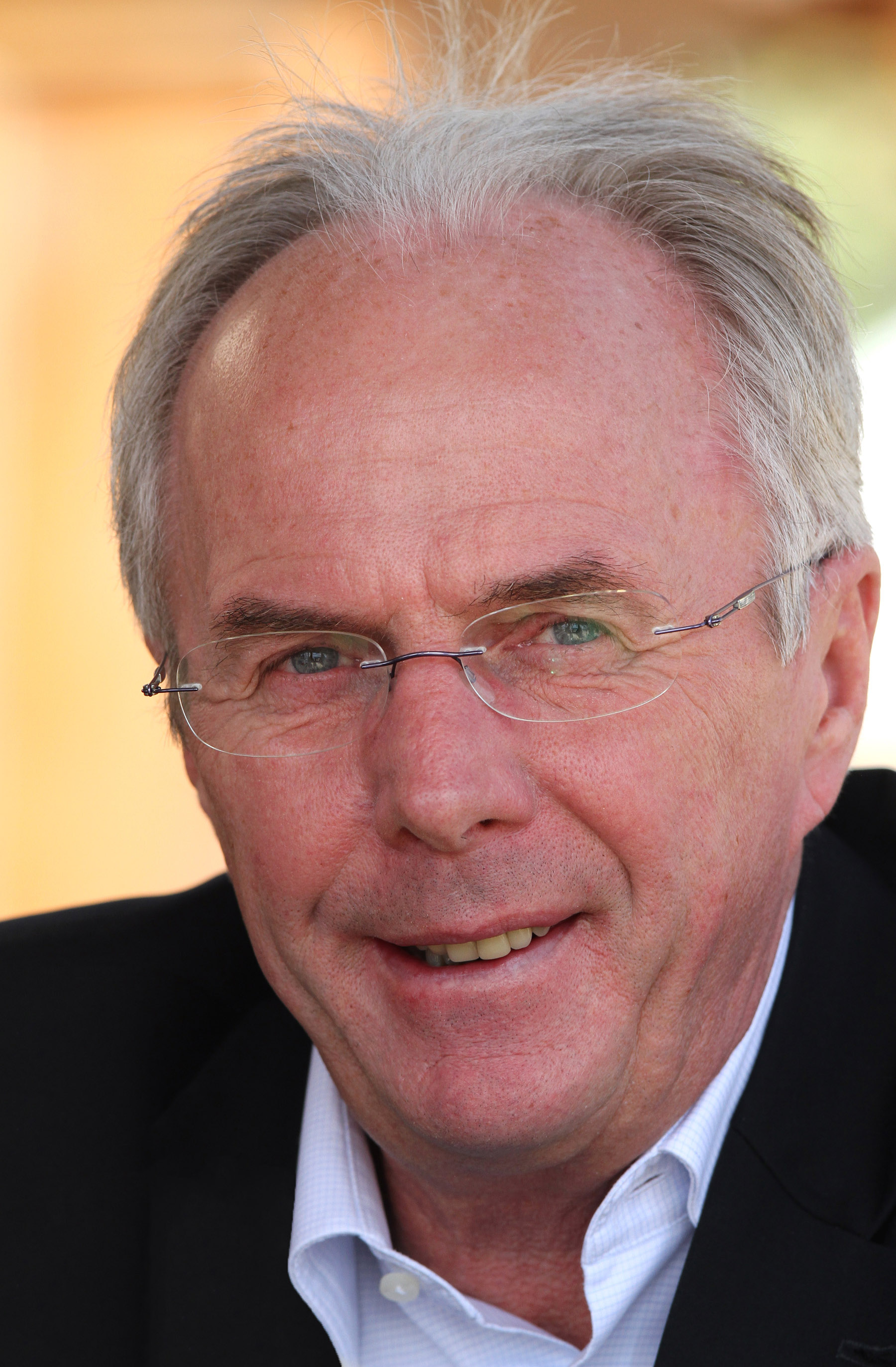
Sven-Göran Eriksson managed IFK Göteborg between 1979 and 1982.

Name	IFK Göteborg career	League matches	Swedish Championship	Svenska Cupen	UEFA Cup
(Sweden) Henning Svensson	1924–1929; 1931–1932; 1943	183			
(Sweden) Eric Hjelm	1930; 1933–1938	137	1934–35		
(Sweden) Ernst Andersson	1941–1942	43	1941–42		
(Hungary) József Nagy	1943–1948	110			
(Austria) Walter Probst	1954–1958	99	1957–58		
(Sweden) Bertil Johansson	1967–1970	88	1969		
(Sweden) Sven-Göran Eriksson	1979–1982	87		1978–79; 1981–82	1981–82
(Sweden) Gunder Bengtsson	1982; 1985–1987	79	1982; 1987		1986–87
(Sweden) Björn Westerberg	1983–1984	44	1983; 1984	1982–83	
(Sweden) Roger Gustafsson	1990–1995; 2002	165	1990; 1991; 1993; 1994; 1995	1991	
(Sweden) Mats Jingblad	1996–1998	60	1996		
(Sweden) Stefan Rehn (Note: Stefan Rehn and Jonas Olsson shared the head coach responsibility from 2007 until halfway through the 2010 season.)	2007–2010	100	2007	2008	
(Sweden) Jonas Olsson	2007–2011	146	2007	2008	
(Sweden) Mikael Stahre	2012–2014; 2021–2023	142		2012–13	
(Sweden) Jörgen Lennartsson	2015–2017	74		2014–15	
(Sweden) Poya Asbaghi	2018–2020	78		2019–20	

== Honours ==
=== Domestic ===
- Swedish Champions (Note: The title of "Swedish Champions" has been awarded to the winner of four different competitions over the years. Between 1896 and 1925 the title was awarded to the winner of Svenska Mästerskapet, a stand-alone cup tournament. No club were given the title between 1926 and 1930 even though the first-tier league Allsvenskan was played. In 1931 the title was reinstated and awarded to the winner of Allsvenskan. Between 1982 and 1990 a play-off in cup format was held at the end of the league season to decide the champions. After the play-off format in 1991 and 1992 the title was decided by the winner of Mästerskapsserien, an additional league after the end of Allsvenskan. Since the 1993 season the title has once again been awarded to the winner of Allsvenskan.)
  - Winners (18): 1908, 1910, 1918, 1934–35, 1941–42, 1957–58, 1969, 1982, 1983, 1984, 1987, 1990, 1991, 1993, 1994, 1995, 1996, 2007

==== League ====
- Allsvenskan:
  - Winners (13): 1934–35, 1941–42, 1957–58, 1969, 1982, 1984, 1990, 1991, 1993, 1994, 1995, 1996, 2007
  - Runners-up (13): 1924–25, 1926–27, 1929–30, 1939–40, 1979, 1981, 1986, 1988, 1997, 2005, 2009, 2014, 2015
- Svenska Serien:
  - Winners (5): 1912–13, 1913–14, 1914–15, 1915–16, 1916–17
- Fyrkantserien:
  - Winners (2): 1918, 1919
- Mästerskapsserien:
  - Winners (1): 1991
- Division 2
  - Winners (3): 1938–39, 1950–51, 1976
  - Runners-up (2): 1972, 1975

==== Cups ====
- Svenska Cupen:
  - Winners (8): 1978–79, 1981–82, 1982–83, 1991, 2008, 2012–13, 2014–15, 2019–20
  - Runners-up (5): 1985–86, 1998–99, 2004, 2007, 2009
- Allsvenskan play-offs:
  - Winners (5): 1982, 1983, 1984, 1987, 1990
  - Runners-up (1): 1985
- Svenska Mästerskapet:
  - Winners (3): 1908, 1910, 1918
- Svenska Supercupen:
  - Winners (1): 2008
  - Runners-up (4): 2009, 2010, 2013, 2015
- Kamratmästerskapen:
  - Winners (11): 1909, 1910, 1912, 1913, 1914, 1915, 1920, 1921, 1922, 1924, 1940
  - Runners-up (2): 1906, 1908

=== European ===
- UEFA Cup:
  - Winners (2): 1981–82, 1986–87
- European Cup/UEFA Champions League:
  - Semi-finals (2): 1985–86, 1992–93
  - Quarter-finals (3): 1984–85, 1988–89, 1994–95
- UEFA Cup Winners' Cup:
  - Quarter-finals (1): 1979–80
- Intertoto Cup:
  - Winners (8): 1967 (Group B4), 1980 (Outright Winner), 1981 (Group 7), 1982 (Group 9), 1983 (Group 7), 1985 (Group 3), 1986 (Group 10), 1988 (Group 2)
- Royal League:
  - Runners-up (1): 2004–05

=== Doubles, trebles and quadruples ===
==== Doubles ====
- Fyrkantserien and Svenska Mästerskapet (Swedish Champions):
  - Winners (1): 1918
- Allsvenskan play-offs (Swedish Champions) and Svenska Cupen:
  - Winners (1): 1983
- Allsvenskan and Allsvenskan play-offs (Swedish Champions):
  - Winners (2): 1984, 1990
- Svenska Cupen and Svenska Supercupen:
  - Winners (1): 2008

==== Trebles ====
- Allsvenskan, Allsvenskan play-offs (Swedish Champions) and the UEFA Cup:
  - Winners (1): 1987
- Allsvenskan, Mästerskapsserien (Swedish Champions) and Svenska Cupen:
  - Winners (1): 1991

==== Quadruples ====
- Allsvenskan, Allsvenskan play-offs (Swedish Champions), Svenska Cupen and the UEFA Cup:
  - Winners (1): 1982

== Records ==
- Home victory, Allsvenskan: 9–1 vs. IK Sleipner, 10 May 1925; 8–0 vs. Hammarby IF, 2 June 1925; 8–0 vs. Stattena IF, 21 April 1930
- Away victory, Allsvenskan: 9–2 vs. IFK Eskilstuna, 8 October 1933; 7–0 vs. IK Sleipner, 20 April 1941
- Home loss, Allsvenskan: 2–9 vs. Malmö FF, 10 September 1949
- Away loss, Allsvenskan: 0–7 vs. IFK Norrköping, 1 May 1960
- Highest attendance, Nya Ullevi: 52,194 vs. Örgryte IS, 3 June 1959
- Highest attendance, Gamla Ullevi: 31,064 vs. GAIS, 27 May 1955
- Highest attendance, Slottsskogsvallen: 21,580 vs. AIK, 25 October 1931
- Highest average attendance, season: 23,796, 1977
- Most appearances, total: 609, Mikael Nilsson 1987–01
- Most appearances, Allsvenskan: 348, Bengt Berndtsson 1951–67
- Most goals scored, total: 333, Filip Johansson 1924–34
- Most goals scored, Allsvenskan: 180, Filip Johansson 1924–34
- Most goals scored, season, Allsvenskan: 39, Filip Johansson 1924–25
