= 1982 UEFA Cup final =

1982 UEFA Cup Final
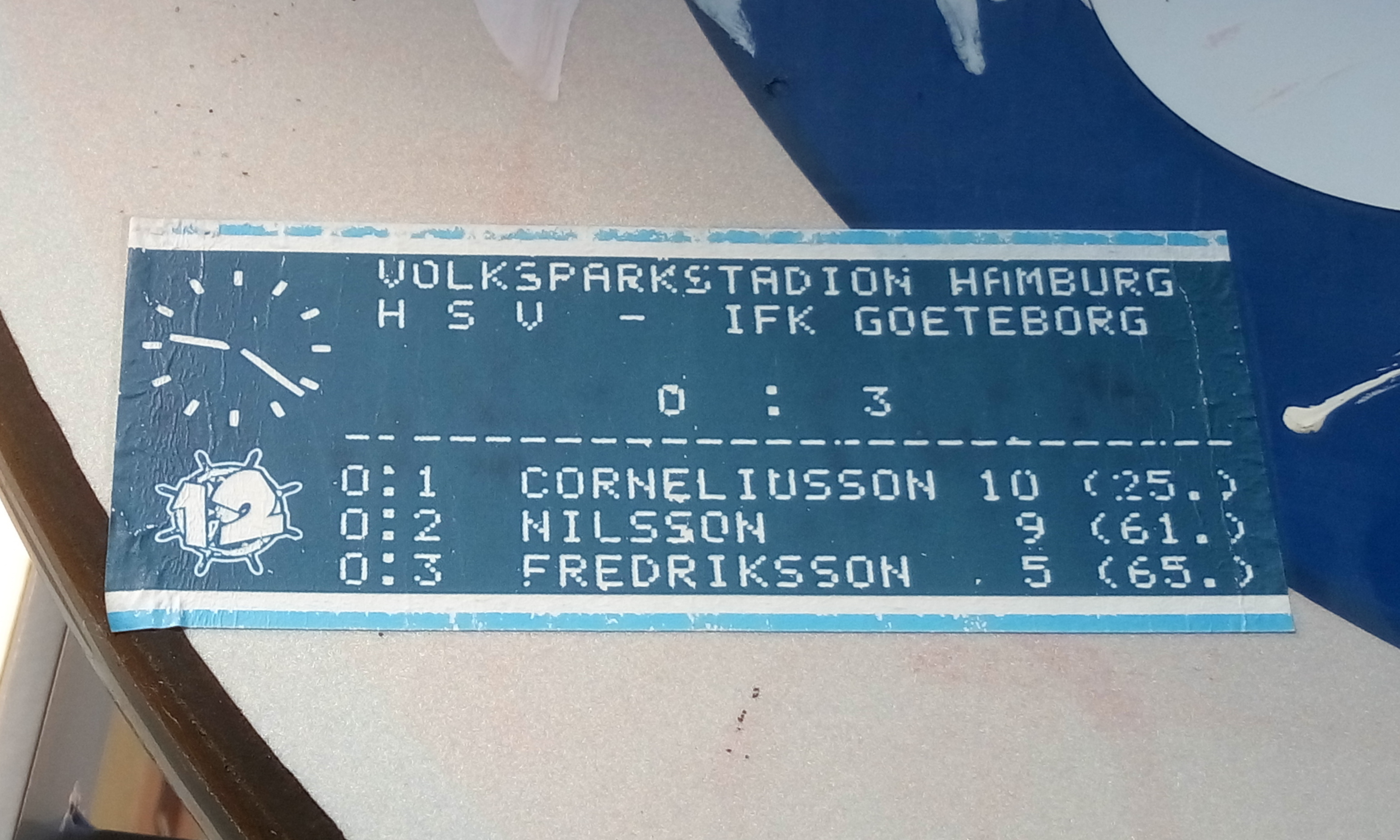
- Sticker commemorating the second leg of the Final.
- Event: 1981–82 UEFA Cup
IFK Göteborg	Hamburger SV
(Sweden)	(West Germany)
4	0
- on aggregate

First leg
IFK Göteborg	Hamburger SV
1	0
- Date: 5 May 1982
- Venue: Ullevi, Gothenburg
- Referee: John Carpenter (Republic of Ireland)
- Attendance: 42,548

Second leg
Hamburger SV	IFK Göteborg
0	3
- Date: 19 May 1982
- Venue: Volksparkstadion, Hamburg
- Referee: George Courtney (England)
- Attendance: 57,312

The 1982 UEFA Cup Final was played on 5 May 1982 and 19 May 1982 between IFK Göteborg of Sweden and Hamburg of West Germany. IFK won 4–0 on aggregate to win the first major European honour in the club's history.

With this defeat, Hamburg became the first club to have been runner-up in all three major pre-1999 European competitions (European Champion Clubs' Cup/UEFA Champions League, UEFA Cup/UEFA Europa League, and the now-defunct Cup Winners' Cup), having lost the 1968 European Cup Winners' Cup Final and the 1980 European Cup Final.

== Route to the final ==
IFK Göteborg				Round	Hamburger SV			
Opponent	Agg.	1st leg	2nd leg		Opponent	Agg.	1st leg	2nd leg
(Finland) Haka	7–2	3–2 (A)	4–0 (H)	First round	(Netherlands) FC Utrecht	6–4	0–1 (H)	6–3 (A)
(Austria) Sturm Graz	5–4	2–2 (A)	3–2 (H)	Second round	(France) Girondins de Bordeaux	3–2	1–2 (A)	2–0 (H)
(Romania) Dinamo București	4–1	3–1 (H)	1–0 (A)	Third round	(Scotland) Aberdeen	5–4	2–3 (A)	3–1 (H)
(Spain) Valencia	4–2	2–2 (A)	2–0 (H)	Quarter-finals	(Switzerland) Neuchâtel Xamax	3–2	3–2 (H)	0–0 (A)
(West Germany) Kaiserslautern	3–2 (a.e.t.)	1–1 (A)	2–1 (a.e.t.) (H)	Semi-finals	(Socialist Federal Republic of Yugoslavia) Radnički Niš	6–3	1–2 (A)	5–1 (H)

== Match details ==
=== First leg ===
5 May 1982

IFK Göteborg (Sweden)	1–0	(West Germany) Hamburger SV
Tord Holmgren 87'	Report Overview (archive) Overview

Ullevi, Gothenburg
Attendance: 42,548
Referee: John Carpenter (Republic of Ireland)

IFK Göteborg	Hamburger SV

GK	1	(Sweden) Thomas Wernerson
DF	2	(Sweden) Ruben Svensson
DF	3	(Sweden) Glenn Hysén
DF	4	(Sweden) Conny Karlsson (c)
DF	5	(Sweden) Stig Fredriksson
MF	6	(Sweden) Tord Holmgren
MF	7	(Sweden) Glenn Strömberg
MF	8	(Sweden) Jerry Carlsson
FW	9	(Sweden) Torbjörn Nilsson	(substituted off) 19'
FW	10	(Sweden) Dan Corneliusson
FW	11	(Sweden) Tommy Holmgren	(substituted off) 46'
Substitutes:
GK	12	(Sweden) Ove Tobiasson
MF	13	(Sweden) Glenn Schiller	(substituted on) 46'
DF	14	(Sweden) Glenn Holm
FW	15	(Sweden) Martin Holmberg
FW	16	(Sweden) Håkan Sandberg	(substituted on) 19'
Manager:
(Sweden) Sven-Göran Eriksson

GK	1	(West Germany) Uli Stein
RB	2	(West Germany) Manfred Kaltz
LB	3	(West Germany) Jürgen Groh
CB	4	(West Germany) Ditmar Jakobs
SW	5	(West Germany) Holger Hieronymus
MF	6	(West Germany) Jimmy Hartwig
MF	7	(West Germany) Bernd Wehmeyer
MF	8	(West Germany) Thomas von Heesen	(substituted off) 82'
CF	9	(West Germany) Horst Hrubesch (c)
MF	10	(West Germany) Felix Magath
CF	11	(Denmark) Lars Bastrup
Substitutes:
MF	12	(West Germany) Caspar Memering	(substituted on) 82'
FW	13	(Socialist Federal Republic of Yugoslavia) Boriša Đorđević
MF	14	(West Germany) Bernhard Scharold
MF	15	(West Germany) Michael Schröder
GK	-	(West Germany) Heinz-Josef Koitka
Manager:
(Austria) Ernst Happel

=== Second leg ===
19 May 1982

Hamburger SV (West Germany)	0–3	(Sweden) IFK Göteborg
	Report Overview (archive) Overview	Corneliusson 25'; Nilsson 62'; Fredriksson 65' (pen.)

Volksparkstadion, Hamburg
Attendance: 57,312
Referee: George Courtney (England)

Hamburger SV	IFK Göteborg

GK	1	(West Germany) Uli Stein
RB	2	(West Germany) Manfred Kaltz	(substituted off) 75'
LB	3	(West Germany) Bernd Wehmeyer
CB	4	(West Germany) Jürgen Groh
SW	5	(West Germany) Holger Hieronymus
MF	6	(West Germany) Jimmy Hartwig
MF	7	(West Germany) Thomas von Heesen
MF	8	(West Germany) Caspar Memering
CF	9	(West Germany) Horst Hrubesch (c)
MF	10	(West Germany) Felix Magath
CF	11	(Denmark) Lars Bastrup
Substitutes:
DF	14	(West Germany) Peter Hidien	(substituted on) 75'
Manager:
(Austria) Ernst Happel

GK	1	(Sweden) Thomas Wernersson
DF	2	(Sweden) Ruben Svensson
DF	3	(Sweden) Glenn Hysén	(substituted off) 19'
DF	4	(Sweden) Conny Karlsson (c)
DF	5	(Sweden) Stig Fredriksson
MF	6	(Sweden) Tord Holmgren
MF	7	(Sweden) Glenn Strömberg
MF	8	(Sweden) Jerry Carlsson
FW	9	(Sweden) Torbjörn Nilsson
FW	10	(Sweden) Dan Corneliusson	(substituted off) 67'
FW	11	(Sweden) Tommy Holmgren
Substitutes:
GK		(Sweden) Ove Tobiasson
MF	13	(Sweden) Glenn Schiller	(substituted on) 19'
DF		(Sweden) Glenn Holm
FW		(Sweden) Martin Holmberg
FW	16	(Sweden) Håkan Sandberg	(substituted on) 67'
Manager:
(Sweden) Sven-Göran Eriksson

== See also ==
- 1982 European Cup final
- 1982 European Cup Winners' Cup final
- IFK Göteborg in European football
- 1981–82 Hamburger SV season
