= List of IFK Göteborg players =

This is a list of notable IFK Göteborg footballers. Generally, this means players that have played more than 300 matches in total for the club, although some exceptional players who have played fewer matches are also included. For a list of all IFK Göteborg players with a Wikipedia article, see the IFK Göteborg players' category. Players are listed according to total number of games played. Substitute appearances included.

As of 31 December 2012

Name	Nat	Pos	IFK Göteborg career	Total apps	Total goals	League apps	League goals	Swedish champion	UEFA Cup winner
Mikael Nilsson	(Sweden)	DF	1987–2001	609	48	307	25	6 (1990, 1991, 1993, 1994, 1995, 1996)	0
Bengt 'Fölet' Berndtsson	(Sweden)	FW	1950–67	599	125	348	69	1 (1957–58)	0
Jerry Carlsson	(Sweden)	MF	1974–87	535	77	247	29	3 (1982, 1983, 1984)	1 (1981–82)
Magnus Erlingmark	(Sweden)	DF/MF/FW	1993–2004	515	77	278	43	4 (1993, 1994, 1995, 1996)	0
Tommy Holmgren	(Sweden)	MF/FW	1977–89	510	69	242	20	4 (1982, 1983, 1984, 1987)	2 (1981–82, 1986–87)
Tord Holmgren	(Sweden)	MF	1977–87	502	52	245	26	4 (1982, 1983, 1984, 1987)	2 (1981–82, 1986–87)
Magnus 'Ölme' Johansson	(Sweden)	DF	1990–98, 2003–07	478	24	223	6	6 (1990, 1991, 1993, 1994, 1995, 1996)	0
Arne Nyberg	(Sweden)	FW	1932–50	469	289	297	130	2 (1934–35, 1941–42)	0
Ernst Andersson	(Sweden)	MF	1927–43	469	14	296	6	2 (1934–35, 1941–42)	0
Anders Rydberg	(Sweden)	GK	1923–39	464	0	296	0	1 (1934–35)	0
Bertil 'Bebben' Johansson	(Sweden)	FW	1954–68	464	290	268	162	1 (1957–58)	0
Håkan Mild	(Sweden)	MF	1988–93, 95–96, 98–2001, 02–05	459	58	252	26	4 (1990, 1991, 1993, 1996)	0
Gunnar Rydberg	(Sweden)	FW	1921–36	457	307	264	147	1 (1934–35)	0
Torbjörn Nilsson	(Sweden)	FW	1975–76, 77–82, 84–86	444	329	212	127	2 (1982, 1984)	1 (1981–82)
Björn 'Nalle' Ericsson	(Sweden)	DF/FW	1964–76	441	82	246	38	1 (1969)	0
Holger Hansson	(Sweden)	MF	1946–61	426	23	254	12	1 (1957–58)	0
Peter 'Erra' Eriksson	(Sweden)	MF	1988–98, 2002	421	93	179	29	3 (1990, 1991, 1993)	0
Henry Andersson	(Sweden)	GK	1943–57, 59–62	417	0	245	0	0	0
Nils 'Tidan' Johansson	(Sweden)	MF	1955–67	410	67	218	20	1 (1957–58)	0
Conny Karlsson	(Sweden)	DF	1975–82	402	10	202	4	1 (1982)	1 (1981–82)
Bengt Andersson	(Sweden)	GK	1998–2008	401	0	246	0	1 (2007)	0
Thomas Ravelli	(Sweden)	GK	1989–97	398	0	211	0	6 (1990, 1991, 1993, 1994, 1995, 1996)	0
Rune 'Killing' Emanuelsson	(Sweden)	DF	1941–56	395	23	227	7	0	0
Ruben Svensson	(Sweden)	DF	1978–86	390	48	195	23	3 (1982, 1983, 1984)	1 (1981–82)
Reine Olausson	(Sweden)	DF/FW	1971–80	385	25	207	7	0	0
Thomas Wernerson	(Sweden)	GK	1981–89	370	0	181	0	4 (1982, 1983, 1984, 1987)	2 (1981–82, 1986–87)
Stig Fredriksson	(Sweden)	DF	1980–88	363	45	179	16	4 (1982, 1983, 1984, 1987)	2 (1981–82, 1986–87)
Erik Bergqvist	(Sweden)	FW	1942–55	355	0	206	0	0	0
Reine Feldt	(Sweden)	DF	1965–75	350	5	214	1	1 (1969)	0
Stefan Lindqvist	(Sweden)	MF/FW	1991–97, 1999	350	38	171	23	5 (1991, 1993, 1994, 1995, 1996)	0
Stefan Pettersson	(Sweden)	FW	1984–88, 94–98	344	116	162	58	4 (1987, 1994, 1995, 1996)	1 (1986–87)
Hjálmar Jónsson	(Iceland)	DF	2002–	337	15	204	6	1 (2007)	0
Donald Niklasson	(Sweden)	DF	1967–78	335	25	189	12	1 (1969)	0
Lennart Nilsson	(Sweden)	DF	1954–65	333	0	165	0	1 (1957–58)	0
Henry Larsson	(Sweden)	DF	1943–54	330	13	176	6	0	0
Pontus Kåmark	(Sweden)	DF	1989–95, 2001–02	330	13	167	4	4 (1991, 1993, 1994, 1995)	0
Holger Bengtsson	(Sweden)	FW	1938–50	328	215	208	100	1 (1941–42)	0
Stefan Selakovic	(Sweden)	MF/FW	2005–12	328	79	201	41	1 (2007)	0
Glenn Hysén	(Sweden)	DF	1978–83, 85–87	319	26	155	13	3 (1982, 1983, 1987)	2 (1981–82, 1986–87)
Filip 'Svarte-Filip' Johansson	(Sweden)	FW	1924–33	277	333	181	180	0	0

Key

- GK — Goalkeeper
- DF — Defender
- MF — Midfielder
- FW — Forward
