= 1981–82 UEFA Cup =

11th season of Europe's secondary club football tournament organised by UEFA

Tournament details
- Dates: 15 September 1981 – 19 May 1982
- Teams: 64 (from 32 associations)

Final positions
- Champions: (Sweden) IFK Göteborg (1st title)
- Runners-up: (West Germany) Hamburger SV

Tournament statistics
- Matches played: 126
- Goals scored: 389 (3.09 per match)
- Top scorer(s): Torbjörn Nilsson (IFK Göteborg); 9 goals

The 1981–82 UEFA Cup was the 11th edition of the UEFA Cup, the third-tier club football competition organised by UEFA. The final was played over two legs at Ullevi, Gothenburg, Sweden, and at the Volksparkstadion, Hamburg, Germany. The final was won by IFK Göteborg of Sweden, who defeated Hamburger SV of Germany by an aggregate result of 4–0 to claim their first UEFA Cup title.

This was the first of two UEFA Cup conquests for Göteborg, which were the only major European titles achieved by Swedish teams. It was also the first Swedish team to play and win in a UEFA Cup final, while Hamburg went on to win the European Cup a year later. For the second and last time in UEFA Cup or UEFA Europa League history, both finalists won their national championship in the same season.

== Association team allocation ==
A total of 64 teams from 32 UEFA member associations participate in the 1981–82 UEFA Cup. The association ranking based on the UEFA country coefficients is used to determine the number of participating teams for each association:

- Associations 1–3 each have four teams qualify.
- Associations 4–8 each have three teams qualify.
- Associations 9–21 each have two teams qualify.
- Associations 22–32 each have one team qualify.

=== Association ranking ===
For the 1981–82 UEFA Cup, the associations are allocated places according to their 1980 UEFA country coefficients, which takes into account their performance in European competitions from 1975–76 to 1979–80.

Association ranking for 1981-82 UEFA Cup

Rank	Association	Coeff.	Teams	Notes
1	West Germany	53.998	4	
2	England	38.426	4	
3	Belgium	37.300	4	
4	Spain	36.066	3	
5	Netherlands	35.250	3	
6	East Germany	29.400	3	
7	Soviet Union	28.050	3	
8	France	27.750	3	
9	(Socialist Federal Republic of Yugoslavia) Yugoslavia	26.000	2	
10	Italy	24.165	2	
11	Czechoslovakia	22.300	2	
12	Hungary	20.150	2	
13	Scotland	19.250	2	
14	Portugal	18.500	2	
15	Switzerland	18.400	2	
-	Wales	17.000	0	
16	Poland	16.850	2	

Rank	Association	Coeff.	Teams	Notes
17	Austria	16.000	2	
18	Greece	15.750	2	
19	Bulgaria	15.450	2	
20	Sweden	14.150	2	
21	Romania	13.050	2	
22	Denmark	10.000	1	
23	(Republic of Ireland) Republic of Ireland	9.665	1	
24	Turkey	7.750	1	
25	Norway	6.500	1	
26	Cyprus	5.332	1	
27	Finland	3.832	1	
=28	Luxembourg	3.666	1	
=28	(Northern Ireland) Northern Ireland	3.666	1	
=30	Malta	3.664	1	
=30	Iceland	3.664	1	
32	Albania	3.000	1	

Wales: There was no national league in Wales before 1992 and the only competition organised by the Football Association of Wales was the Welsh Cup so Wales had just a single participant in European competitions, the winner (or best placed Welsh team as several English teams also competed) of the Welsh Cup which competed in the UEFA Cup Winners' Cup. Its virtual ranking is only an original research, because the UEFA country ranking was only used to allocate the UEFA Cup spots at time, so Wales was not included.

=== Teams ===
The labels in the parentheses show how each team qualified for competition:

- TH: Title holders
- CW: Cup winners
- CR: Cup runners-up
- LC: League Cup winners
- 2nd, 3rd, 4th, 5th, 6th, etc.: League position
- P-W: End-of-season European competition play-offs winners

Qualified teams for 1981–82 UEFA Cup
(West Germany) Hamburger SV (2nd)	(West Germany) Stuttgart (3rd)	(West Germany) Kaiserslautern (4th)	(West Germany) Borussia Mönchengladbach (6th)
(England) Ipswich Town (2nd)^{TH}	(England) Arsenal (3rd)	(England) West Bromwich Albion (4th)	(England) Southampton (6th)
(Belgium) Lokeren (2nd)	(Belgium) Beveren (4th)	(Belgium) Winterslag (5th)	(Belgium) Club Brugge (6th)
(Spain) Real Madrid (2nd)	(Spain) Atlético Madrid (3rd)	(Spain) Valencia (4th)	(Netherlands) Utrecht (3rd)
(Netherlands) Feyenoord (4th)	(Netherlands) PSV Eindhoven (5th)	(East Germany) Carl Zeiss Jena (2nd)	(East Germany) Magdeburg (3rd)
(East Germany) Dynamo Dresden (4th)	(Soviet Union) Spartak Moscow (2nd)	(Soviet Union) Zenit Leningrad (3rd)	(Soviet Union) CSKA Moscow (5th)
(France) Nantes (2nd)	(France) Bordeaux (3rd)	(France) Monaco (4th)	(Socialist Federal Republic of Yugoslavia) Hajduk Split (2nd)
(Socialist Federal Republic of Yugoslavia) Radnički Niš (3rd)	(Italy) Napoli (3rd)	(Italy) Internazionale (4th)	(Czechoslovakia) Bohemians Praha (3rd)
(Czechoslovakia) Sparta Prague (4th)	(Hungary) Tatabánya (2nd)	(Hungary) Videoton (4th)	(Scotland) Aberdeen (2nd)
(Scotland) Dundee United (LC)	(Portugal) Sporting CP (3rd)	(Portugal) Boavista (4th)	(Switzerland) Grasshoppers (2nd)
(Switzerland) Neuchâtel Xamax (3rd)	(Poland) Wisła Kraków (2nd)	(Poland) Szombierki Bytom (3rd)	(Austria) Sturm Graz (2nd)
(Austria) Rapid Wien (3rd)	(Greece) Aris (3rd)	(Greece) Panathinaikos (5th)	(Bulgaria) Levski-Spartak Sofia (2nd)
(Bulgaria) Akademik Sofia (4th)	(Sweden) Malmö (2nd)	(Sweden) IFK Göteborg (3rd)	(Romania) Dinamo București (2nd)
(Romania) Argeș Pitești (3rd)	(Denmark) Næstved (2nd)	(Republic of Ireland) Limerick United (3rd)	(Turkey) Adanaspor (2nd)
(Norway) Bryne (2nd)	(Cyprus) APOEL (2nd)	(Finland) Haka (2nd)	(Northern Ireland) Linfield (2nd)
(Luxembourg) Red Boys Differdange (2nd)	(Iceland) Víkingur (P-W)	(Malta) Sliema Wanderers (2nd)	(Albania) Dinamo Tirana (2nd)

Notes

1. Greece: AEK Athens finished second in the 1980–81 Alpha Ethniki, but couldn't qualify for the UEFA Cup due to a one year ban imposed in 1979, due to incidents in the locker room and the referees' room after a return game against Argeș Pitești in the first round of the 1979–80 European Cup. The ban was only due to be enacted on the first season where AEK would've qualified for European competition, having failed to do so the previous year after losing a play-off game that would've enable AEK to serve its penalty a year earlier. Therefore, the UEFA Cup place went to the 5th placed team, Panathinaikos.

== Schedule ==
The schedule of the competition was as follows. Matches were scheduled for Wednesdays, though some matches exceptionally took place on Tuesdays, and two first round matches were held on Thursdays.

Schedule for 1981–82 UEFA Cup
Round	First leg	Second leg
First round	15–17 September 1981	29 September – 1 October 1981
Second round	20–21 October 1981	3–4 November 1981
Third round	25 November – 1 December 1981	9 December 1981
Quarter-finals	3 March 1982	17 March 1982
Semi-finals	7 April 1982	21 April 1982
Final	5 May 1982	19 May 1982

== Bracket ==
First round
(Austria) Rapid Wien	2	2	4
(Hungary) Videoton	2	0	2
(Netherlands) PSV Eindhoven	7	1	8
(Denmark) Næstved	0	2	2
(Hungary) Tatabánya	2	0	2
(Spain) Real Madrid (a)	1	1	2
(Albania) Dinamo Tirana	1	0	1
(East Germany) Carl Zeiss Jena	0	4	4
(Greece) Aris	4	4	8
(Malta) Sliema Wanderers	0	2	2
(France) Nantes	1	2	3
(Belgium) Lokeren	1	4	5
(Soviet Union) Spartak Moscow	3	3	6
(Belgium) Club Brugge	1	1	2
(West Germany) 1. FC Kaiserslautern	1	2	3
(Bulgaria) Akademik Sofia	0	1	1
(Czechoslovakia) Bohemians	0	0	0
(Spain) Valencia	1	1	2
(Portugal) Boavista	4	1	5
(Spain) Atlético Madrid	1	3	4
(Belgium) Beveren	3	5	8
(Northern Ireland) Linfield	0	0	0
(Socialist Federal Republic of Yugoslavia) Hajduk Split	3	2	5
(West Germany) VfB Stuttgart	1	2	3
(Austria) Sturm Graz (a)	1	1	2
(Soviet Union) CSKA Moscow	0	2	2
(Finland) Haka	2	0	2
(Sweden) IFK Göteborg	3	4	7
(Turkey) Adanaspor	1	1	2
(Italy) Internazionale	3	4	7
(Romania) Dinamo București	3	1	4
(Bulgaria) Levski Sofia	0	2	2
(Norway) Bryne	0	2	2
(Belgium) FC Winterslag	2	1	3
(Greece) Panathinaikos	0	0	0
(England) Arsenal	2	1	3
(East Germany) 1. FC Magdeburg	3	0	3
(West Germany) Borussia Mönchengladbach (a)	1	2	3
(France) Monaco	2	2	4
(Scotland) Dundee United	5	1	6
(Switzerland) Grasshoppers	1	3	4
(England) West Bromwich Albion	0	1	1
(Italy) Napoli	2	0	2
(Socialist Federal Republic of Yugoslavia) Radnički Niš (a)	2	0	2
(Netherlands) Feyenoord	2	1	3
(Poland) Szombierki Bytom	0	1	1
(Soviet Union) Zenit Leningrad	1	1	2
(East Germany) Dynamo Dresden	2	4	6
(England) Ipswich Town	1	1	2
(Scotland) Aberdeen	1	3	4
(Cyprus) APOEL	1	0	1
(Romania) Argeș Pitești	1	4	5
(Iceland) Víkingur	0	0	0
(France) Bordeaux	4	4	8
(West Germany) Hamburger SV	0	6	6
(Netherlands) FC Utrecht	1	3	4
(Republic of Ireland) Limerick United	0	1	1
(England) Southampton	3	1	4
(Portugal) Sporting CP	4	7	11
(Luxembourg) FA Red Boys Differdange	0	0	0
(Sweden) Malmö FF	2	3	5
(Poland) Wisła Kraków	0	1	1
(Switzerland) Neuchâtel Xamax	4	2	6
(Czechoslovakia) Sparta Prague	0	3	3

Second round
(Austria) Rapid Wien (a)	1	1	2
(Netherlands) PSV Eindhoven	0	2	2
(Spain) Real Madrid	3	0	3
(East Germany) Carl Zeiss Jena	2	0	2
(Greece) Aris	1	0	1
(Belgium) Lokeren	1	4	5
(Soviet Union) Spartak Moscow	2	0	2
(West Germany) 1. FC Kaiserslautern	1	4	5
(Spain) Valencia	2	0	2
(Portugal) Boavista	0	1	1
(Belgium) Beveren	2	2	4
(Socialist Federal Republic of Yugoslavia) Hajduk Split (a)	3	1	4
(Austria) Sturm Graz	2	2	4
(Sweden) IFK Göteborg	2	3	5
(Italy) Internazionale	1	2	3
(Romania) Dinamo București	1	3	4
(Belgium) FC Winterslag (a)	1	1	2
(England) Arsenal	0	2	2
(West Germany) Borussia Mönchengladbach	2	0	2
(Scotland) Dundee United	0	5	5
(Switzerland) Grasshoppers	2	0	2
(Socialist Federal Republic of Yugoslavia) Radnički Niš	0	2	2
(Netherlands) Feyenoord	2	1	3
(East Germany) Dynamo Dresden	1	1	2
(Scotland) Aberdeen	3	2	5
(Romania) Argeș Pitești	0	2	2
(France) Bordeaux	2	0	2
(West Germany) Hamburger SV	1	2	3
(England) Southampton	2	0	2
(Portugal) Sporting CP	4	0	4
(Sweden) Malmö FF	0	0	0
(Switzerland) Neuchâtel Xamax	1	1	2

Round of 16
(Austria) Rapid Wien	0	0	0
(Spain) Real Madrid	1	0	1
(Belgium) Lokeren	1	1	2
(West Germany) 1. FC Kaiserslautern	0	4	4
(Spain) Valencia	5	1	6
(Socialist Federal Republic of Yugoslavia) Hajduk Split	1	4	5
(Sweden) IFK Göteborg	3	1	4
(Romania) Dinamo București	1	0	1
(Belgium) FC Winterslag	0	0	0
(Scotland) Dundee United	0	5	5
(Socialist Federal Republic of Yugoslavia) Radnički Niš	2	0	2
(Netherlands) Feyenoord	0	1	1
(Scotland) Aberdeen	3	1	4
(West Germany) Hamburger SV	2	3	5
(Portugal) Sporting CP	0	0	0
(Switzerland) Neuchâtel Xamax	0	1	1

Quarter-finals
(Spain) Real Madrid	3	0	3
(West Germany) 1. FC Kaiserslautern	1	5	6
(Spain) Valencia	2	0	2
(Sweden) IFK Göteborg	2	2	4
(Scotland) Dundee United	2	0	2
(Socialist Federal Republic of Yugoslavia) Radnički Niš	0	3	3
(West Germany) Hamburger SV	3	0	3
(Switzerland) Neuchâtel Xamax	2	0	2

Semi-finals
(West Germany) 1. FC Kaiserslautern	1	1	2
(Sweden) IFK Göteborg	1	2	3
(Socialist Federal Republic of Yugoslavia) Radnički Niš	2	1	3
(West Germany) Hamburger SV	1	5	6

Final
(Sweden) IFK Göteborg	1	3	4
(West Germany) Hamburger SV	0	0	0

== First round ==
Team 1	Agg.	Team 2	1st leg	2nd leg
1. FC Kaiserslautern (West Germany)	3–1	(Bulgaria) Akademik Sofia	1–0	2–1
1. FC Magdeburg (East Germany)	3–3 (a)	(West Germany) Borussia Mönchengladbach	3–1	0–2
Adanaspor (Turkey)	2–7	(Italy) Internazionale	1–3	1–4
APOEL (Cyprus)	1–5	(Romania) Argeș Pitești	1–1	0–4
Aris (Greece)	8–2	(Malta) Sliema Wanderers	4–0	4–2
Monaco (France)	4–6	(Scotland) Dundee United	2–5	2–1
Boavista (Portugal)	5–4	(Spain) Atlético Madrid	4–1	1–3
Bryne (Norway)	2–3	(Belgium) FC Winterslag	0–2	2–1
Dinamo București (Romania)	4–2	(Bulgaria) Levski Sofia	3–0	1–2
Bohemians (Czechoslovakia)	0–2	(Spain) Valencia	0–1	0–1
Haka (Finland)	2–7	(Sweden) IFK Göteborg	2–3	0–4
Nantes (France)	3–5	(Belgium) Lokeren	1–1	2–4
Spartak Moscow (Soviet Union)	6–2	(Belgium) Club Brugge	3–1	3–1
Zenit Leningrad (Soviet Union)	2–6	(East Germany) Dynamo Dresden	1–2	1–4
Feyenoord (Netherlands)	3–1	(Poland) Szombierki Bytom	2–0	1–1
Grasshoppers (Switzerland)	4–1	(England) West Bromwich Albion	1–0	3–1
Hajduk Split (Socialist Federal Republic of Yugoslavia)	5–3	(West Germany) VfB Stuttgart	3–1	2–2
Hamburger SV (West Germany)	6–4	(Netherlands) FC Utrecht	0–1	6–3
Ipswich Town (England)	2–4	(Scotland) Aberdeen	1–1	1–3
Beveren (Belgium)	8–0	(Northern Ireland) Linfield	3–0	5–0
Víkingur (Iceland)	0–8	(France) Bordeaux	0–4	0–4
Dinamo Tirana (Albania)	1–4	(East Germany) Carl Zeiss Jena	1–0	0–4
Limerick United (Republic of Ireland)	1–4	(England) Southampton	0–3	1–1
Malmö FF (Sweden)	5–1	(Poland) Wisła Kraków	2–0	3–1
Napoli (Italy)	2–2 (a)	(Socialist Federal Republic of Yugoslavia) Radnički Niš	2–2	0–0
Neuchâtel Xamax (Switzerland)	6–3	(Czechoslovakia) Sparta Prague	4–0	2–3
Panathinaikos (Greece)	0–3	(England) Arsenal	0–2	0–1
PSV Eindhoven (Netherlands)	8–2	(Denmark) Næstved	7–0	1–2
Rapid Wien (Austria)	4–2	(Hungary) Videoton	2–2	2–0
Sturm Graz (Austria)	2–2 (a)	(Soviet Union) CSKA Moscow	1–0	1–2
Sporting CP (Portugal)	11–0	(Luxembourg) FA Red Boys Differdange	4–0	7–0
Tatabánya (Hungary)	2–2 (a)	(Spain) Real Madrid	2–1	0–1

=== First leg ===
15 September 1981
17:00

Bohemians (Czechoslovakia)	0–1	(Spain) Valencia
		Saura 67'

V Dolicku
Referee: Rolf Ericsson (Sweden)

15 September 1981
20:00

Neuchâtel Xamax (Switzerland)	4–0	(Czechoslovakia) Sparta Prague
Lüthi 8', 80'; Pellegrini 22'; Trinchero 30' (pen.)

Stade de la Maladière, Neuchâtel
Attendance: 13,000
Referee: Luigi Angolin (Italy)

16 September 1981
15:00

Tatabánya (Hungary)	2–1	(Spain) Real Madrid
Weimper 31' (pen.); Csapó 78'		Santillana 44'

Grosics Gyula Stadion, Tatabánya
Referee: Adolf Mathias (Austria)

16 September 1981
15:45

Aris (Greece)	4–0	(Malta) Sliema Wanderers
Panov 33'; Kouis 63', 77' (pen.), 89'

Kleanthis Vikelidis Stadium, Thessaloniki
Referee: Cristian Teodorescu (Romania)

16 September 1981
17:30

Dinamo București (Romania)	3–0	(Bulgaria) Levski Spartak Sofia
Georgescu 12', 41'; Dragnea 37'	Report

Stadionul Dinamo, Bucharest
Attendance: 13,000
Referee: Talal Tokat (Turkey)

16 September 1981
16:30

Dinamo Tirana (Albania)	1–0	(East Germany) Carl Zeiss Jena
Zëri 61'

Selman Stërmasi Stadium, Tirana
Referee: Laszlo Györi (Hungary)

16 September 1981
17:00

Spartak Moscow (Soviet Union)	3–1	(Belgium) Club Brugge
Shvetsov 7', 63'; Gavrilov 80'		Sørensen 15'

Lokomotiv Stadium, Moscow
Referee: Ulf Eriksson (Sweden)

16 September 1981
17:00

Zenit Leningrad (Soviet Union)	1–2	(East Germany) Dynamo Dresden
Zheludkov 14'		Dörner 32'; Heidler 36'

Leningrad

16 September 1981
18:00

Bryne (Norway)	0–2	(Belgium) FC Winterslag
		Berger 32'; Weis 85'

Bryne Stadion, Bryne
Referee: Ib. F. Nielsen (Denmark)

16 September 1981
18:00

Rapid Wien (Austria)	2–2	(Hungary) Videoton
Weber 82'; Panenka 89' (pen.)		Szabo 31'; Végh 87' (pen.)

Gerhard Hanappi Stadium, Vienna
Referee: Trajce Madzovski (Yugoslavia)

16 September 1981
18:00

Haka (Finland)	2–3	(Sweden) IFK Göteborg
Kujanpää 14', 68'		Fredriksson 26' (pen.); Corneliusson 46'; Carlsson 60'

Tehtaan kenttä, Valkeakoski
Referee: Rolf Haugen (Norway)

16 September 1981
18:30

Boavista (Portugal)	4–1	(Spain) Atlético Madrid
Vital 6'; Jorge Silva 17'; Diamantino 74'; Palhares 88'		Pedro Pablo 61'

Estádio do Bessa, Porto
Attendance: 20,000
Referee: John Hunting (England)

16 September 1981
18:45

Limerick United (Republic of Ireland)	0–3	(England) Southampton
	Report	Moran 58', 59'; Armstrong 78'

Markets Field, Limerick
Attendance: 10,000
Referee: Henk van Ettekoven (Netherlands)

16 September 1981
19:00

Hajduk Split (Socialist Federal Republic of Yugoslavia)	3–1	(West Germany) VfB Stuttgart
Zo. Vujović 40'; Zl. Vujović 65', 69'		Rožić 57' (o.g.)

Stadion Poljud, Split
Referee: Marcel Van Langenhove (Belgium)

16 September 1981
19:00

Malmö FF (Sweden)	2–0	(Poland) Wisła Kraków
Nilsson 33'; Kindvall 58'

Malmö IP, Malmö
Referee: Gerd Hennig (West Germany)

16 September 1981
19:30

Adanaspor (Turkey)	1–3	(Italy) Internazionale
Özer 11' (pen.)		Serena 60'; Bini 77'; Altobelli 89'

5 Ocak Stadium, Adana
Referee: Vojtech Christov (Czechoslovakia)

16 September 1981
19:30

Panathinaikos (Greece)	0–2	(England) Arsenal
		McDermott 34'; Meade 72'

Olympic Stadium, Athens
Referee: Siegfried Kirschen (East Germany)

16 September 1981
19:30

PSV Eindhoven (Netherlands)	7–0	(Denmark) Naestved BK
R. van de Kerkhof 6'; W. van de Kerkhof 11'; Thoresen 17'; Geels 51', 61', 77'; Huh 85'

Philips Stadion, Eindhoven
Referee: Frederick Mcknight (Northern Ireland)

16 September 1981
19:30

Sturm Graz (Austria)	1–0	(Soviet Union) CSKA Moscow
Schauss 67'

Stadion Graz-Liebenau, Graz
Referee: Alojzy Jarguz (Poland)

16 September 1981
20:00

Beveren (Belgium)	3–0	(Northern Ireland) Linfield
Schönberger 25' (pen.); Albert 58'; Martens 60'

Freethiel Stadion, Beveren
Referee: Jean-Marie Macheret (Switzerland)

17 September 1981

Víkingur (Iceland)	0-4	(France) Bordeaux
		Fernandez 16'; Tresor 30'; Gemmrich 40'; Lacombe 70'

Víkingsvöllur, Reykjavík
Attendance: 1,500
Referee: Hugh Alexander (Scotland)

16 September 1981
20:00

APOEL (Cyprus)	1–1	(Romania) Argeș Pitești
Antoniou 10'	Report	Ignat 20'

Makario Stadium, Nicosia
Attendance: 10,000
Referee: Hiqmet Kuka (Albania)

16 September 1981
20:00

Feyenoord (Netherlands)	2–0	(Poland) Szombierki Bytom
Bouwens 72'; Nielsen 78'

De Kuip, Rotterdam
Referee: Josef Poucek (Czechoslovakia)

16 September 1981
20:00

Grasshoppers (Switzerland)	1–0	(England) West Bromwich Albion
Fimian 39'

Hardturm, Zürich
Referee: Franz Wöhrer (Austria)

16 September 1981
20:00

Hamburger SV (West Germany)	0–1	(Netherlands) FC Utrecht
	Report	Carbo 79'

Volksparkstadion, Hamburg
Referee: Dušan Krchnak (Czechoslovakia)

16 September 1981
20:00

1. FC Kaiserslautern (West Germany)	1–0	(Bulgaria) Akademik Sofia
Brehme 28' (pen.)

Fritz-Walter-Stadion, Kaiserslautern
Referee: Zoran Petrović (Yugoslavia)

16 September 1981
20:00

1. FC Magdeburg (East Germany)	3–1	(West Germany) Borussia Mönchengladbach
Hoffmann 39'; Streich 42'; Matthäus 57' (o.g.)		Mill 51'

Ernst Grube Stadium, Magdeburg
Referee: Brian Mcginlay (Scotland)

16 September 1981
20:30

Nantes (France)	1–1	(Belgium) Lokeren
Halilhodžić 2'		Dobiaš 51'

Stade de la Beaujoire, Nantes
Referee: Klaus Scheurell (East Germany)

16 September 1981
20:30

Ipswich Town (England)	1–1	(Scotland) Aberdeen
Thijssen 45'		Hewitt 65'

Portman Road, Ipswich
Referee: Gianfranco Menegali (Italy)

16 September 1981
20:30

Monaco (France)	2–5	(Scotland) Dundee United
Edström 62'; Bellone 89'		Kirkwood 15'; Dodds 20', 72'; Bannon 70' (pen.), 85' (pen.)

Stade Louis II, Monaco
Referee: Jose L. Garcia Carrion (Spain)

16 September 1981
20:30

Napoli (Italy)	2–2	(Socialist Federal Republic of Yugoslavia) Radnički Niš
Damiani 69' (pen.); Musella 81'		Stoiljković 71'; Aleksić 79'

Stadio San Paolo, Naples
Referee: George Courtney, (England)

16 September 1981
21:30

Sporting CP (Portugal)	4–0	(Luxembourg) Red Boys Differdange
António Oliveira 29', 85'; Manuel Fernandes 47'; Rui Jordão 89'

Estádio José Alvalade, Lisbon
Attendance: 30,000
Referee: Victoriano Sanchez Arminio (Spain)

=== Second leg ===
30 September 1981
21:00

Valencia (Spain)	1–0	(Czechoslovakia) Bohemians
Solsona 32'

Mestalla, Valencia
Referee: André Daina (Switzerland)

Valencia won 2–0 on aggregate.

29 September 1981
17:00

Sparta Prague (Czechoslovakia)	3–2	(Switzerland) Neuchâtel Xamax
Chovanec 51'; Straka 72' (pen.); Kotal 84'		Trinchero 24' (pen.); Lüthi 41'

Stadion Letná, Prague
Referee: Heinz Fahnler (Austria)

Neuchâtel Xamax won 6–3 on aggregate.

30 September 1981
21:00

Real Madrid (Spain)	1–0	(Hungary) Tatabánya
Isidro 73'

Santiago Bernabéu, Madrid
Referee: Patrick Mulhall (Republic of Ireland)

2–2 on aggregate; Real Madrid won on away goals.

30 September 1981
15:45

Sliema Wanderers (Malta)	2–4	(Greece) Aris
Tortell 50'; Losco 80'		Semertzidis 13'; Kouis 15'; Zelilidis 60'; Panov 83'

Ta' Qali National Stadium, Attard
Referee: Pietro D'elia (Italy)

Aris won 8–2 on aggregate.

29 September 1981
17:30

Levski Spartak Sofia (Bulgaria)	2–1	(Romania) Dinamo București
Kurdov 22', 33'	Report	Augustin 86'

Vasil Levski, Sofia
Attendance: 35,000
Referee: Eldar Azimzade (Soviet Union)

Dinamo București won 4–2 on aggregate.

30 September 1981
20:00

Carl Zeiss Jena (East Germany)	4–0	(Albania) Dinamo Tirana
Raab 11'; Schnuphase 60', 67'; Trocha 82'

Ernst-Abbe-Sportfeld, Jena
Referee: Gheorghe Dragomir (Romania)

Carl Zeiss Jena won 4–1 on aggregate.

30 September 1981
18:00

Club Brugge (Belgium)	1–3	(Soviet Union) Spartak Moscow
Wellens 31'		Rodionov 13'; Shavlo 42'; Gavrilov 48'

Jan Breydel Stadium, Bruges
Referee: Miklos Nagy (Hungary)

Spartak Moscow won 6–2 on aggregate.

30 September 1981
20:00

Dynamo Dresden (East Germany)	4–1	(Soviet Union) Zenit Leningrad
Trautmann 9'; Schmuck 14'; Minge 49'; Heidler 71'		Kazachyonok 39'

Rudolf-Harbig-Stadium, Dresden
Referee: Velitchko Nikolov Tzontchev (Bulgaria)

Dynamo Dresden won 6–2 on aggregate.

30 September 1981
18:00

FC Winterslag (Belgium)	1–2	(Norway) Bryne
Billen 17'		Mæland 22'; Hellvik 50'

Referee: David Syme (Scotland)

FC Winterslag won 3–2 on aggregate.

30 September 1981
19:00

Videoton (Hungary)	0–2	(Austria) Rapid Wien
		Krankl 21', 79'

Sóstói Stadion, Székesfehérvár
Referee: Evangelos Giannacoudakis (Greece)

Rapid Wien won 4–2 on aggregate.

30 September 1981
19:00

IFK Göteborg (Sweden)	4–0	(Finland) Haka
Schiller 2'; Nilsson 6'; Karlsson 27'; Holmgren 67'

Ullevi, Gothenburg
Referee: Siegfried Kirschen (East Germany)

IFK Göteborg won 7–2 on aggregate.

1 October 1981
21:00

Atlético Madrid (Spain)	3–1	(Portugal) Boavista
Dirceu 9', 61'; Cano 87' (pen.)		Diamantino 43'

Vicente Calderón Stadium, Madrid
Referee: Walter Horstmann (West Germany)

Boavista won 5–4 on aggregate.

29 September 1981
20:30

Southampton (England)	1–1	(Republic of Ireland) Limerick United
Keegan 63'	Report	Walsh 65'

The Dell, Southampton
Attendance: 12,841
Referee: Rolf Nyhus (Norway)

Southampton won 4–1 on aggregate.

30 September 1981
19:30

VfB Stuttgart (West Germany)	2–2	(Socialist Federal Republic of Yugoslavia) Hajduk Split
Schäfer 83'; D. Müller 85'		Bogdanović 11'; Jelikić 29'

Neckarstadion, Stuttgart
Referee: Károly Palotai (Hungary)

Hajduk Split won 5–3 on aggregate.

30 September 1981
17:30

Wisła Kraków (Poland)	1–3	(Sweden) Malmö FF
Kapka 5'		Palmér 51'; Prytz 64'; Nilsson 73'

Stadion Miejski, Kraków
Referee: Hendrik Weerink (Netherlands)

Malmö FF won 5–1 on aggregate.

30 September 1981
20:15

Internazionale (Italy)	4–1	(Turkey) Adanaspor
Beccalossi 18'; Bagni 52'; Serena 75'; Altobelli 80'		Kahraman 87'

San Siro, Milan
Referee: Ivan Yossifov (Bulgaria)

Internazionale won 7–2 on aggregate.

30 September 1981
20:30

Arsenal (England)	1–0	(Greece) Panathinaikos
Talbot 53'

Highbury, London
Referee: Erich Linemayr (Austria)

Arsenal won 3–0 on aggregate.

30 September 1981
19:00

Naestved BK (Denmark)	2–1	(Netherlands) PSV Eindhoven
Hansen 55', 88'		Thoresen 64'

Næstved Stadion, Næstved
Referee: Arto Ravander (Finland)

PSV Eindhoven won 8–2 on aggregate.

30 September 1981
19:00

CSKA Moscow (Soviet Union)	2–1	(Austria) Sturm Graz
Chesnokov 26'; Tarkhanov 74'		Bakota 64'

Peschanoe Stadium, Moscow
Referee: Paolo Bergamo (Italy)

2–2 on aggregate, Sturm Graz won on away goals

29 September 1981
19:30

Linfield (Northern Ireland)	0–5	(Belgium) Beveren
		Martens 24', 46', 64', 87'; D. Pfaff 49'

Windsor Park, Belfast
Referee: Egbert Mulder (Netherlands)

Beveren won 8–0 on aggregate.

30 September 1981

(France) Bordeaux	4-0	Víkingur (Iceland)
Fernandez 44'; Martinez 75'; Relmy 80'; Tresdor 87'

Stade Chaban-Delmas, Bordeaux
Attendance: 6,500
Referee: Francis Bastian (Luxembourg)

30 September 1981
14:30

Argeș Pitești (Romania)	4–0	(Cyprus) APOEL
Turcu 21'; Băluță 28'; Cârstea 61'; Kallo 77'	Report

Stadionul 1 Mai, Pitești
Attendance: 9,000
Referee: Myroslav Stupar (Soviet Union)

Argeș Pitești won 5–1 on aggregate.

30 September 1981
14:30

Szombierki Bytom (Poland)	1–1	(Netherlands) Feyenoord
Ogaza 53'		Bouwens 87'

Stadion Szombierek, Bytom
Referee: Jack Baumann (Switzerland)

Feyenoord won 3–1 on aggregate.

30 September 1981
19:30

West Bromwich Albion (England)	1–3	(Switzerland) Grasshoppers
Robertson 49'		Fimian 11'; Koller 15'; Jara 74'

The Hawthorns, West Bromwich
Referee: Günter Linn (West Germany)

Grasshoppers won 4–1 on aggregate.

30 September 1981
20:00

FC Utrecht (Netherlands)	3–6	(West Germany) Hamburger SV
Carbo 58' de Kruijk 65' (pen.) van Veen 78'	Report	Milewski 14', 84'; Wehmeyer 24'; Hartwig 38'; Bastrup 46' von Heesen 61'

Stadion Galgenwaard, Utrecht
Referee: David Richardson (England)

Hamburger SV won 6–4 on aggregate.

30 September 1981
19:30

Akademik Sofia (Bulgaria)	1–2	(West Germany) 1. FC Kaiserslautern
Lipenski 15'		Melzer 19'; Briegel 25' (pen.)

Sportkomplex Akademik, Sofia
Referee: Alain Delmer (France)

1. FC Kaiserslautern won 3–1 on aggregate.

30 September 1981
20:00

Borussia Mönchengladbach (West Germany)	2–0	(East Germany) 1. FC Magdeburg
Pinkall 66'; Matthäus 84'

Bökelbergstadion, Mönchengladbach
Referee: Ronald Bridges (Wales)

3–3 on aggregate; Borussia Mönchengladbach won on away goals.

29 September 1981
20:00

Lokeren (Belgium)	4–2	(France) Nantes
Lato 20'; Snelders 27'; Verheyen 62'; Elkjær 69'		Muller 81'; Baronchelli 83'

Daknamstadion, Lokeren
Referee: Alfred Grey (England)

Lokeren won 5–3 on aggregate.

30 September 1981
20:30

Aberdeen (Scotland)	3–1	(England) Ipswich Town
Strachan 10' (pen.); Weir 55', 85'		Wark 34' (pen.)

Pittodrie Stadium, Aberdeen
Referee: Michel Vautrot (France)

Aberdeen won 4–2 on aggregate.

30 September 1981
20:30

Dundee United (Scotland)	1–2	(France) Monaco
Milne 79'		Edström 47'; Bellone 59'

Tannadice Park, Dundee
Referee: Roger Verhaeghe (Belgium)

Dundee United won 6–4 on aggregate.

30 September 1981

Radnički Niš (Socialist Federal Republic of Yugoslavia)	0–0	(Italy) Napoli

2–2 on aggregate; Radnički Niš won on away goals.

30 September 1981
20:00

Red Boys Differdange (Luxembourg)	0–7	(Portugal) Sporting CP
		António Oliveira 15', 35', 84'; Inácio 28'; Rui Jordão 32'; Mário Jorge 53'; Carlos Freire 79'

Stade du Thillenberg, Differdange
Attendance: 3,250
Referee: Louis Delsemme (Belgium)

Sporting CP won 11–0 on aggregate.

== Second round ==
Team 1	Agg.	Team 2	1st leg	2nd leg
Aberdeen (Scotland)	5–2	(Romania) Argeș Pitești	3–0	2–2
Aris (Greece)	1–5	(Belgium) Lokeren	1–1	0–4
Borussia Mönchengladbach (West Germany)	2–5	(Scotland) Dundee United	2–0	0–5
Bordeaux (France)	2–3	(West Germany) Hamburger SV	2–1	0–2
Spartak Moscow (Soviet Union)	2–5	(West Germany) 1. FC Kaiserslautern	2–1	0–4
Feyenoord (Netherlands)	3–2	(East Germany) Dynamo Dresden	2–1	1–1
Grasshoppers (Switzerland)	2–2 (0–3 p)	(Socialist Federal Republic of Yugoslavia) Radnički Niš	2–0	0–2 (a.e.t.)
Internazionale (Italy)	3–4	(Romania) Dinamo București	1–1	2–3 (a.e.t.)
FC Winterslag (Belgium)	2–2 (a)	(England) Arsenal	1–0	1–2
K.S.K. Beveren (Belgium)	4–4 (a)	(Socialist Federal Republic of Yugoslavia) Hajduk Split	2–3	2–1
Malmö FF (Sweden)	0–2	(Switzerland) Neuchâtel Xamax	0–1	0–1
Real Madrid (Spain)	3–2	(East Germany) Carl Zeiss Jena	3–2	0–0
Rapid Wien (Austria)	2–2 (a)	(Netherlands) PSV Eindhoven	1–0	1–2
Sturm Graz (Austria)	4–5	(Sweden) IFK Göteborg	2–2	2–3
Southampton (England)	2–4	(Portugal) Sporting CP	2–4	0–0
Valencia (Spain)	2–1	(Portugal) Boavista	2–0	0–1

=== First leg ===
21 October 1981
12:30

Aberdeen (Scotland)	3–0	(Romania) Argeș Pitești
Strachan 12'; Weir 24'; Hewitt 45'	Report

Pittodrie Stadium, Aberdeen
Attendance: 20,000
Referee: Svein Inge Thime (Norway)

21 October 1981
14:15

Aris (Greece)	1–1	(Belgium) Lokeren
Kouis 87'		Elkjær 53'

Kleanthis Vikelidis Stadium, Thessaloniki
Referee: Bogdan Dochev (Bulgaria)

20 October 1981
20:00

Borussia Mönchengladbach (West Germany)	2–0	(Scotland) Dundee United
Schäffer 70'; Hannes 86'

Bökelbergstadion, Mönchengladbach
Referee: Nicolae Rainea (Romania)

21 October 1981
20:30

Bordeaux (France)	2–1	(West Germany) Hamburger SV
Gemmrich 13'; Soler 77'		Kaltz 29' (pen.)

Stade Chaban-Delmas, Bordeaux
Referee: André Daina (Switzerland)

21 October 1981
17:00

Spartak Moscow (Soviet Union)	2–1	(West Germany) 1. FC Kaiserslautern
Rodionov 38'; Gavrilov 61'		Funkel 82'

Lokomotiv Stadium, Moscow
Referee: Egbert Mulder (Netherlands)

21 October 1981
20:00

Feyenoord (Netherlands)	2–1	(East Germany) Dynamo Dresden
Kaczor 55'; Vermeulen 71'		Heidler 41'

De Kuip, Rotterdam
Referee: Clive Thomas (Wales)

21 October 1981

Grasshoppers (Switzerland)	2–0	(Socialist Federal Republic of Yugoslavia) Radnički Niš
Jara 17'; Sulser 78' (pen.)

Referee: Emmanuel Platopoulos (Greece)

21 October 1981
19:45

Internazionale (Italy)	1–1	(Romania) Dinamo București
Pasinato 24'	Report	Custov 39'

San Siro, Milan
Attendance: 40,000
Referee: Georges Konrath (France)

20 October 1981
20:00

FC Winterslag (Belgium)	1–0	(England) Arsenal
Berger 62'

Winterslag Stadium, Genk
Referee: Emilio Guruceta Muro (Spain)

21 October 1981
20:00

Beveren (Belgium)	2–3	(Socialist Federal Republic of Yugoslavia) Hajduk Split
Theunis 68'; Van Moer 69'		Gudelj 17'; Zl. Vujović 39'; Slišković 72'

Freethiel Stadion, Beveren
Referee: Romualdas Yushka (Soviet Union)

21 October 1981
19:00

Malmö FF (Sweden)	0–1	(Switzerland) Neuchâtel Xamax
		Pellegrini 9'

Malmö IP, Malmö
Referee: Juhani Smolander (Finland)

21 October 1981
21:00

Real Madrid (Spain)	3–2	(East Germany) Carl Zeiss Jena
García Cortés 66' (pen.); Gallego 76'; Isidro 78'		Bielau 36'; Kurbjuweit 72'

Santiago Bernabéu, Madrid
Referee: Marcel Van Langenhove (Belgium)

21 October 1981
20:00

Rapid Wien (Austria)	1–0	(Netherlands) PSV Eindhoven
Panenka 72'

Gerhard Hanappi Stadium, Vienna
Referee: Klaus Scheurell (East Germany)

20 October 1981

Sturm Graz (Austria)	2–2	(Sweden) IFK Göteborg
Breber 14'; Niederbacher 22'		Nilsson 36', 68'

Stadion Graz-Liebenau, Austria
Referee: Edvard Sostaric (Yugoslavia)

21 October 1981
20:30

Southampton (England)	2–4	(Portugal) Sporting CP
Keegan 68' (pen.); Channon 71'		Jordão 2'; Holmes 20' (o.g.); Manuel Fernandes 41', 90+1'

The Dell, Southampton
Attendance: 18,573
Referee: Erik Fredriksson (Sweden)

21 October 1981
21:00

Valencia (Spain)	2–0	(Portugal) Boavista
Roberto 54'; Welzl 84'

Estadio Luis Casanova, Valencia
Attendance: 32,500
Referee: Alexis Ponnet (Belgium)

=== Second leg ===
4 November 1981
12:30

Argeș Pitești (Romania)	2–2	(Scotland) Aberdeen
Radu II 31'; Bărbulescu 36'	Report	Strachan 55' (pen.); Hewitt 85'

Stadionul 1 Mai, Pitești
Attendance: 13,000
Referee: Jan Redelfs (West Germany)

Aberdeen won 5–2 on aggregate.

4 November 1981
20:00

Lokeren (Belgium)	4–0	(Greece) Aris
Guðjohnsen 32', 51'; Lato 42'; Mommens 78'

Daknamstadion, Lokeren
Referee: Ronald Bridges (Wales)

Lokeren won 5–1 on aggregate.

3 November 1981
20:30

Dundee United (Scotland)	5–0	(West Germany) Borussia Mönchengladbach
Milne 36'; Kirkwood 44'; Sturrock 52'; Hegarty 75'; Bannon 76'

Tannadice Park, Dundee
Referee: Ulf Eriksson (Sweden)

Dundee United won 5–2 on aggregate.

4 November 1981
20:00

Hamburger SV (West Germany)	2–0	(France) Bordeaux
Hrubesch 27', 43'

Volksparkstadion, Hamburg
Referee: Miklos Nagy (Hungary)

Hamburger SV won 3–2 on aggregate.

4 November 1981
20:00

1. FC Kaiserslautern (West Germany)	4–0	(Soviet Union) Spartak Moscow
Funkel 12'; Briegel 44', 65'; Geye 54'

Fritz-Walter-Stadion, Kaiserslautern
Referee: Victoriano Sanchez Arminio (Spain)

1. FC Kaiserslautern won 5–2 on aggregate.

4 November 1981
17:00

Dynamo Dresden (East Germany)	1–1	(Netherlands) Feyenoord
Lippmann 84'		van Deinsen 89'

Rudolf-Harbig-Stadium, Dresden
Referee: George Courtney (England)

Feyenoord won 3–2 on aggregate.

4 November 1981
13:30

Radnički Niš (Socialist Federal Republic of Yugoslavia)	2–0 (a.e.t.)	(Switzerland) Grasshoppers
Đorđević 39' (pen.); Savić 65'
Penalties
	3–0

Čair Stadium, Niš
Referee: Dušan Krchnak (Czechoslovakia)

2–2 on aggregate; Radnički Niš won 3–0 on penalties.

4 November 1981
13:00

Dinamo București (Romania)	3–2 (a.e.t.)	(Italy) Internazionale
Georgescu 30'; Augustin 100'; Orac 107'	Report	Altobelli 47'; Prohaska 94'

Stadionul Dinamo, Bucharest
Attendance: 20,000
Referee: Roger Schoeters (Belgium)

Dinamo București won 4–3 on aggregate.

3 November 1981
20:30

Arsenal (England)	2–1	(Belgium) FC Winterslag
Hollins 32'; Rix 71'		Billen 3'

Highbury, London
Referee: Alojzy Jarguz (Poland)

2–2 on aggregate; Winterslag won on away goals.

4 November 1981
17:30

Hajduk Split (Socialist Federal Republic of Yugoslavia)	1–2	(Belgium) Beveren
Pešić 67'		Crève 12'; Albert 17'

Stadion Poljud, Split
Referee: Talat Tokat (Turkey)

4–4 on aggregate; Hajduk Split won on away goals.

3 November 1981
20:00

Neuchâtel Xamax (Switzerland)	1–0	(Sweden) Malmö FF
Pellegrini 58'

Stade de la Maladière, Neuchâtel
Referee: Augusto Marques Pires (Portugal)

Neuchâtel Xamax won 2–0 on aggregate.

4 November 1981
20:00

Carl Zeiss Jena (East Germany)	0–0	(Spain) Real Madrid

Ernst-Abbe-Sportfeld, Jena
Referee: Brian Mcginlay (Scotland)

Real Madrid won 3–2 on aggregate.

4 November 1981
19:30

PSV Eindhoven (Netherlands)	2–1	(Austria) Rapid Wien
Poortvliet 38', 57'		Krankl 26'

Philips Stadion, Eindhoven
Referee: David Syme (Scotland)

2–2 on aggregate; Rapid Wien won on away goals.

4 November 1981

IFK Göteborg (Sweden)	3–2	(Austria) Sturm Graz
Tor. Holmgren 47'; Nilsson 75'; Fredriksson 89' (pen.)		Stendal 70'; Bakota 82'

Gamla Ullevi, Sweden
Referee: Rolf Nyhus (Norway)

IFK Göteborg won 5–4 on aggregate.

4 November 1981
22:00

Sporting CP (Portugal)	0–0	(England) Southampton

Estádio José Alvalade, Lisbon
Attendance: 50,000
Referee: Rudolf Renggli (Switzerland)

Sporting CP won 4–2 on aggregate.

4 November 1981
16:00

Boavista (Portugal)	1–0	(Spain) Valencia
Diamantino 12'

Estádio do Bessa, Porto
Attendance: 15,000
Referee: Vojtech Christov (Czechoslovakia)

Valencia won 2–1 on aggregate.

== Third round ==
Team 1	Agg.	Team 2	1st leg	2nd leg
Aberdeen (Scotland)	4–5	(West Germany) Hamburger SV	3–2	1–3
IFK Göteborg (Sweden)	4–1	(Romania) Dinamo București	3–1	1–0
FC Winterslag (Belgium)	0–5	(Scotland) Dundee United	0–0	0–5
Lokeren (Belgium)	2–4	(West Germany) 1. FC Kaiserslautern	1–0	1–4
Radnički Niš (Socialist Federal Republic of Yugoslavia)	2–1	(Netherlands) Feyenoord	2–0	0–1
Rapid Wien (Austria)	0–1	(Spain) Real Madrid	0–1	0–0
Sporting CP (Portugal)	0–1	(Switzerland) Neuchâtel Xamax	0–0	0–1
Valencia (Spain)	6–5	(Socialist Federal Republic of Yugoslavia) Hajduk Split	5–1	1–4

=== First leg ===
25 November 1981
20:30

Aberdeen (Scotland)	3–2	(West Germany) Hamburger SV
Black 25'; Hewitt 65', 81'		Hrubesch 51', 87'

Pittodrie, Aberdeen
Referee: Roger Schoeters (Belgium)

25 November 1981
18:00

IFK Göteborg (Sweden)	3–1	(Romania) Dinamo București
Holmgren 27'; Nilsson 33', 51'	Report	Mulțescu 64'

Ullevi, Gothenburg
Attendance: 10,000
Referee: Volker Roth (West Germany)

1 December 1981
20:00

FC Winterslag (Belgium)	0–0	(Scotland) Dundee United

Referee: Bruno Galler (Switzerland)

25 November 1981
20:00

Lokeren (Belgium)	1–0	(West Germany) 1. FC Kaiserslautern
Lato 46'

Daknamstadion, Lokeren
Referee: Gianfranco Menegali (Italy)

25 November 1981
13:00

Radnički Niš (Socialist Federal Republic of Yugoslavia)	2–0	(Netherlands) Feyenoord
Radosavljević 28'; Savić 81'

Čair Stadium, Niš
Referee: Emilio Guruceta Mur (Spain)

25 November 1981
17:00

Rapid Wien (Austria)	0–1	(Spain) Real Madrid
		Santillana 79'

Gerhard Hanappi Stadium, Vienna
Referee: Georges Konrath (France)

25 November 1981

Sporting CP (Portugal)	0–0	(Switzerland) Neuchâtel Xamax

Estádio José Alvalade, Lisbon
Attendance: 42,500
Referee: Siegfried Kirschen (East Germany)

25 November 1981
20:00

Valencia (Spain)	5–1	(Socialist Federal Republic of Yugoslavia) Hajduk Split
Tendillo 27'; Rodríguez 31', 51'; Welzl 84'; Arnesen 89'		Zoran Vujović 66'

Mestalla, Valencia
Referee: Robert Valentine (Scotland)

=== Second leg ===
9 December 1981
20:00

Hamburger SV (West Germany)	3–1	(Scotland) Aberdeen
Hrubesch 33'; Memering 59'; Jakobs 67'		McGhee 79'

Volksparkstadion, Hamburg
Referee: Romualdas Yushka (Soviet Union)

Hamburger SV won 5–4 on aggregate.

9 December 1981
12:00

Dinamo București (Romania)	0–1	(Sweden) IFK Göteborg
	Report	Nilsson 23'

Stadionul Dinamo, Bucharest
Attendance: 15,000
Referee: Egbert Mulder (Netherlands)

IFK Göteborg won 4–1 on aggregate.

9 December 1981
20:30

Dundee United (Scotland)	5–0	(Belgium) FC Winterslag
Bannon 25'; Narey 33'; Hegarty 37'; Milne 50', 70'

Tannadice, Dundee
Referee: Vojtech Christov (Slovakia)

Dundee United won 5–0 on aggregate.

9 December 1981
20:00

1. FC Kaiserslautern (West Germany)	4–1	(Belgium) Lokeren
Hofeditz 43'; Briegel 63'; Eilenfeldt 73'; Funkel 80'		Guðjohnsen 84'

Fritz-Walter-Stadion, Kaiserslautern
Referee: Ioan Igna (Romania)

1. FC Kaiserslautern won 4–2 on aggregate.

9 December 1981
20:00

Feyenoord (Netherlands)	1–0	(Socialist Federal Republic of Yugoslavia) Radnički Niš
Nielsen 29'

De Kuip, Rotterdam
Referee: Erik Fredriksson (Sweden)

Radnički Niš won 2–1 on aggregate.

9 December 1981
21:00

Real Madrid (Spain)	0–0	(Austria) Rapid Wien

Santiago Bernabéu, Madrid
Referee: Jack Baumann (Switzerland)

Real Madrid won 1–0 on aggregate.

9 December 1981
20:00

Neuchâtel Xamax (Switzerland)	1–0	(Portugal) Sporting CP
Andrey 27'

Stade de la Maladière, Neuchâtel
Attendance: 17,187
Referee: Bogdan Dochev (Bulgaria)

Neuchâtel Xamax won 1–0 on aggregate.

9 December 1981
16:30

Hajduk Split (Socialist Federal Republic of Yugoslavia)	4–1	(Spain) Valencia
Gudelj 7', 68', 90+1'; Primorac 21'		Saura 52'

Stadion Poljud, Split
Referee: Erich Linemayr (Austria)

Valencia won 6–5 on aggregate.

== Quarter-finals ==
Team 1	Agg.	Team 2	1st leg	2nd leg
Dundee United (Scotland)	2–3	(Socialist Federal Republic of Yugoslavia) Radnički Niš	2–0	0–3
Hamburger SV (West Germany)	3–2	(Switzerland) Neuchâtel Xamax	3–2	0–0
Real Madrid (Spain)	3–6	(West Germany) 1. FC Kaiserslautern	3–1	0–5
Valencia (Spain)	2–4	(Sweden) IFK Göteborg	2–2	0–2

=== First leg ===
3 March 1982
20:30

Dundee United (Scotland)	2–0	(Socialist Federal Republic of Yugoslavia) Radnički Niš
Narey 41'; Dodds 43'

Tannadice, Dundee
Referee: Jan Redelfs (West Germany)

3 March 1982
20:00

Hamburger SV (West Germany)	3–2	(Switzerland) Neuchâtel Xamax
Bastrup 32'; Memering 71'; Von Heesen 75'		Givens 36'; Lüthi 52'

Volksparkstadion, Hamburg
Referee: Anders Mattsson (Finland)

3 March 1982
21:00

Real Madrid (Spain)	3–1	(West Germany) 1. FC Kaiserslautern
Cunningham 25'; Hernández 34'; Juanito 68'		Eilenfeldt 81' (pen.)

Santiago Bernabéu, Madrid
Referee: Vojtech Christov (Czechoslovakia)

3 March 1982
21:00

Valencia (Spain)	2–2	(Sweden) IFK Göteborg
Arnesen 6', 18'		Svensson 13'; Nilsson 14'

Mestalla, Valencia
Attendance: 28,000
Referee: John Carpenter (Republic of Ireland)

=== Second leg ===
17 March 1982
15:00

Radnički Niš (Socialist Federal Republic of Yugoslavia)	3–0	(Scotland) Dundee United
Panajotović 52', 72'; Nikolić 86'

Čair Stadium, Niš
Referee: Bogdan Dochev (Bulgaria)

Radnički Niš won 3–2 on aggregate.

17 March 1982
20:00

Neuchâtel Xamax (Switzerland)	0–0	(West Germany) Hamburger SV

Stade de la Maladière, Neuchâtel
Referee: Alojzy Jarguz (Poland)

Hamburger SV won 3–2 on aggregate.

17 March 1982
21:00

1. FC Kaiserslautern (West Germany)	5–0	(Spain) Real Madrid
Funkel 7', 17'; Bongartz 48'; Eilenfeldt 54'; Geye 71'

Fritz-Walter-Stadion, Kaiserslautern
Referee: Károly Palotai (Hungary)

1. FC Kaiserslautern won 6–3 on aggregate.

17 March 1982
19:00

IFK Göteborg (Sweden)	2–0	(Spain) Valencia
Holmgren 4'; Fredriksson 59' (pen.)

Ullevi, Gothenburg
Attendance: 50,108
Referee: Luigi Agnolin (Italy)

IFK Göteborg won 4–2 on aggregate.

== Semi-finals ==
Team 1	Agg.	Team 2	1st leg	2nd leg
1. FC Kaiserslautern (West Germany)	2–3	(Sweden) IFK Göteborg	1–1	1–2 (a.e.t.)
Radnički Niš (Socialist Federal Republic of Yugoslavia)	3–6	(West Germany) Hamburger SV	2–1	1–5

=== First leg ===
7 April 1982
20:00

1. FC Kaiserslautern (West Germany)	1–1	(Sweden) IFK Göteborg
Hofeditz 9'		Corneliusson 28'

Fritz-Walter-Stadion, Kaiserslautern
Attendance: 34,500
Referee: Roger Schoeters (Belgium)

7 April 1982
16:00

Radnički Niš (Socialist Federal Republic of Yugoslavia)	2–1	(West Germany) Hamburger SV
Beganović 49'; Obradović 78'		von Heesen 57'

Čair Stadium, Niš
Referee: Luigi Agnolin (Italy)

=== Second leg ===
21 April 1982
19:00

IFK Göteborg (Sweden)	2–1 (a.e.t.)	(West Germany) 1. FC Kaiserslautern
Holmgren 42'; Fredriksson 102' (pen.)		Geye 57'

Ullevi, Gothenburg
Attendance: 50,053
Referee: Romualdas Yushka (Soviet Union)

IFK Göteborg won 3–2 on aggregate.

21 April 1982
16:00

Hamburger SV (West Germany)	5–1	(Socialist Federal Republic of Yugoslavia) Radnički Niš
Hartwig 7', 30'; Von Heesen 21', 49'; Magath 58'		Panajotović 84'

Volksparkstadion, Hamburg
Referee: André Daina (Switzerland)

Hamburger SV won 6–3 on aggregate.

== Final ==
=== First leg ===
5 May 1982
19:00

IFK Göteborg (Sweden)	1–0	(West Germany) Hamburger SV
Holmgren 88'

Ullevi, Gothenburg
Attendance: 42,548
Referee: John Carpenter (Republic of Ireland)

=== Second leg ===
19 May 1982
19:00

Hamburger SV (West Germany)	0–3	(Sweden) IFK Göteborg
		Corneliusson 25'; Nilsson 61'; Fredriksson 65' (pen.)

Volksparkstadion, Hamburg
Attendance: 57,312
Referee: George Courtney (England)

IFK Göteborg won 4–0 on aggregate.

== Top goalscorers ==
Rank	Name	Team	Goals
1	(Sweden) Torbjörn Nilsson	(Sweden) IFK Göteborg	9
=2	(Greece) Dinos Kouis	(Greece) Aris	5
=2	(Sweden) Stig Fredriksson	(Sweden) IFK Göteborg	5
=2	(Scotland) John Hewitt	(Scotland) Aberdeen	5
=2	(Portugal) António Oliveira	(Portugal) Sporting CP	5
=2	(Belgium) Ronny Martens	(Belgium) Beveren	5
=2	(West Germany) Thomas von Heesen	(West Germany) Hamburger SV	5
=2	(West Germany) Friedhelm Funkel	(West Germany) 1. FC Kaiserslautern	5
=2	(West Germany) Horst Hrubesch	(West Germany) Hamburger SV	5
=10	(Switzerland) Robert Lüthi	(Switzerland) Neuchâtel Xamax	4
=10	(Scotland) Eamonn Bannon	(Scotland) Dundee United	4
=10	(West Germany) Hans-Peter Briegel	(West Germany) 1. FC Kaiserslautern	4
=10	(Scotland) Ralph Milne	(Scotland) Dundee United	4
=10	(Socialist Federal Republic of Yugoslavia) Ivan Gudelj	(Socialist Federal Republic of Yugoslavia) Hajduk Split	4
=10	(West Germany) Norbert Eilenfeldt	(West Germany) 1. FC Kaiserslautern	4
