= Thomas Ravelli =

Swedish footballer (born 1959)

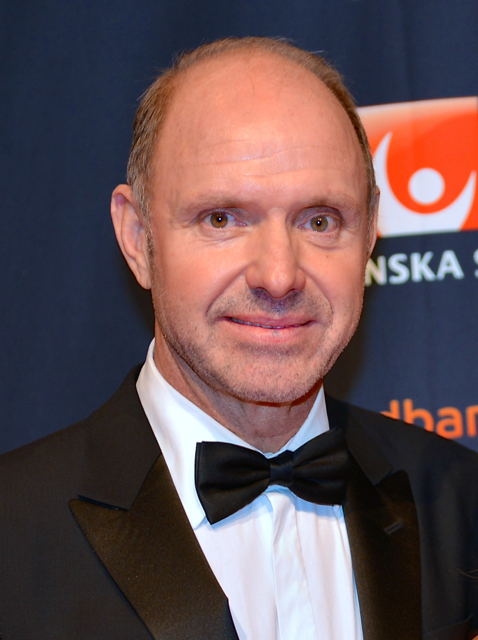
- Ravelli at the Swedish Sports Awards inside the Stockholm Globe Arena in Stockholm, Sweden in 2014

Personal information
- Full name: Thomas Ravelli
- Date of birth: 13 August 1959 (age 67)
- Place of birth: Vimmerby, Sweden
- Height: 1.86 m (6 ft 1 in)
- Position: Goalkeeper

Youth career
- Öster

Senior career*
Years	Team	Apps	(Gls)
1976–1988	Öster	219	(0)
1989–1997	IFK Göteborg	211	(0)
1998	Tampa Bay Mutiny	23	(0)
1999	Öster	8	(0)
Total		461	(0)

International career
1977	Sweden U18	9	(0)
1979–1981	Sweden U21	10	(0)
1981–1997	Sweden	143	(0)
Medal record
Sweden
FIFA World Cup
Bronze medal – third place	1994 United States
- * Club domestic league appearances and goals

Thomas Ravelli (Swedish: [ˈtʊ̌mːas raˈvɛ̌lːɪ]; born 13 August 1959) is a Swedish former professional footballer who played as a goalkeeper. His 21-year professional career was almost exclusively associated with Öster and Göteborg, for whom he appeared in a combined 416 Allsvenskan games. The most-capped player for the Sweden national team for several years, Ravelli represented the nation at the 1990 and 1994 FIFA World Cups, and UEFA Euro 1992. In 1981, he was awarded Guldbollen as Sweden's best footballer of the year.

== Club career ==
Ravelli was born in Vimmerby where he lived his first five years of life. After a shorter stint in Åtvidaberg the family settled in Växjö. At the club level he played for Östers IF and IFK Göteborg, winning three Allsvenskan championships during his ten-year tenure with the former team before signing for the latter in 1989, at the age of 29.

With Göteborg, Ravelli conquered a further six leagues and his only Swedish Cup. In 1998, already 39, he joined the Tampa Bay Mutiny of Major League Soccer, closing out his career the following year with his first club; in total, he played in nearly 500 official matches as a professional.

== International career ==
Ravelli's international career spanned almost two decades, starting in 1981. He played in the 1990 FIFA World Cup, UEFA Euro 1992, and the 1994 World Cup, with Sweden finishing third in the latter tournament, and appeared in a total of 143 games. The 1994 World Cup semi-final against Brazil was Ravelli's 116th game for Sweden, overtaking Björn Nordqvist's appearances record.

He is well known for saving two penalties during the shootout against Romania in 1994 World Cup's quarter-final clash, including one in the "sudden death" by Miodrag Belodedici (5–4 win). This feat led to him finishing second in the year's race for Goalkeeper of the Year, behind Belgian Michel Preud'Homme, and he was also named by France Football as the seventh best player in Europe.

== Style of play ==
Ravelli was a goalkeeper who was regarded in particular for his positional sense and ability to read the game and organise his defence. As such, he is often considered to be a world-class player in his prime, as well as one of Sweden's greatest goalkeepers ever. Ravelli was also known for his leadership and vocal presence in goal in spite of his eccentric and temperamental personality. He stood out for his longevity throughout his career; however, he also came into criticism at times from his managers over his poor work-rate in training.

Although Ravelli was not known to be a penalty-saving specialist, Ravelli drew attention to himself in the media when he stopped two penalties in Sweden's quarter-final penalty shoot-out victory over Romania at the 1994 World Cup.

Ravelli was also known for his temperament among teammates, and he was also known to be a prankster, at one point cutting holes into Martin Dahlin's underwear.

== Personal life ==
Ravelli's twin brother, Andreas, is also a former footballer. Their father, Dr. Peter Ravelli, was an Austrian immigrant of Italian descent who moved to Sweden in 1952, and the siblings played alongside each other at Öster and the national team.

Ravelli participated as a celebrity dancer in Let's Dance 2019, broadcast on TV4.

== Career statistics ==
=== Club ===
Appearances and goals by club, season and competition
Club	Season	League			Cup		Continental		Total	
Club	Season	Division	Apps	Goals	Apps	Goals	Apps	Goals	Apps	Goals
Östers IF	1976	Allsvenskan	0	0			1	0		
Östers IF	1977	Allsvenskan	0	0						
Östers IF	1978	Allsvenskan	0	0						
Östers IF	1979	Allsvenskan	13	0						
Östers IF	1980	Allsvenskan	26	0						
Östers IF	1981	Allsvenskan	26	0						
Östers IF	1982	Allsvenskan	24	0						
Östers IF	1983	Allsvenskan	28	0						
Östers IF	1984	Allsvenskan	17	0						
Östers IF	1985	Allsvenskan	19	0						
Östers IF	1986	Allsvenskan	20	0						
Östers IF	1987	Allsvenskan	24	0						
Östers IF	1988	Allsvenskan	22	0						
Östers IF	Total		219	0						
IFK Göteborg	1989	Allsvenskan	22	0	5	0	2	0	29	0
IFK Göteborg	1990	Allsvenskan	26	0	2	0	–		28	0
IFK Göteborg	1991	Allsvenskan	28	0	6	0	4	0	38	0
IFK Göteborg	1992	Allsvenskan	24	0	1	0	4	0	29	0
IFK Göteborg	1993	Allsvenskan	26	0	3	0	4	0	33	0
IFK Göteborg	1994	Allsvenskan	25	0	1	0	8	0	34	0
IFK Göteborg	1995	Allsvenskan	20	0	6	0	3	0	29	0
IFK Göteborg	1996	Allsvenskan	17	0	5	0	8	0	30	0
IFK Göteborg	1997	Allsvenskan	23	0	1	0	7	0	31	0
IFK Göteborg	Total		211	0	30	0	40	0	281	0
Tampa Bay Mutiny	1998	Major League Soccer	23	0			–			
Östers IF	1999	Division 1 Södra	8	0			–			
Career total			461	0						

=== International ===
Appearances and goals by national team and year
National team	Year	Apps	Goals
Sweden	1981	10	0
Sweden	1982	7	0
Sweden	1983	10	0
Sweden	1984	6	0
Sweden	1985	6	0
Sweden	1986	4	0
Sweden	1987	9	0
Sweden	1988	8	0
Sweden	1989	8	0
Sweden	1990	10	0
Sweden	1991	7	0
Sweden	1992	10	0
Sweden	1993	9	0
Sweden	1994	17	0
Sweden	1995	7	0
Sweden	1996	5	0
Sweden	1997	10	0
Total		143	0

== Honours ==
Östers IF

- Allsvenskan: 1978, 1980, 1981

IFK Göteborg

- Allsvenskan: 1990, 1991, 1993, 1994, 1995, 1996
- Svenska Cupen: 1991

Sweden

- FIFA World Cup bronze: 1994

Individual

- Guldbollen: 1981
- Swedish Goalkeeper of the Year: 1995, 1997
- IFFHS World's Best Goalkeeper: Silver Ball 1994, Bronze Ball 1995
- MLS All-Star, 1998
- Årets Ärkeängel: 1991

== See also ==
- List of European association football families
- List of men's footballers with 100 or more international caps
