= Thomas Wernerson =

Swedish former footballer

Personal information
- Full name: Thomas Eric Ivar Wernersson
- Date of birth: 15 June 1955 (age 71)
- Place of birth: Nässjö, Sweden
- Position: Goalkeeper

Youth career
- Handskeryds IF

Senior career*
Years	Team	Apps	(Gls)
1975–1980	Åtvidabergs FF	127	(0)
1981–1987	IFK Göteborg	153	(0)
Total		280	(0)

International career
1979–1985	Sweden	9	(0)
- * Club domestic league appearances and goals

Thomas Eric Ivar Wernersson (born 15 June 1955), better known as Thomas Wernerson, is a Swedish former professional footballer who played as a goalkeeper. Starting off his career with Åtvidabergs FF in the mid-1970s, he is best remembered for his time with IFK Göteborg between 1981 and 1987 with which he won two UEFA Cup titles and four Swedish Championships. A full international between 1979 and 1985, he won nine caps for the Sweden national team.

== Club career ==
=== Åtvidabergs FF ===
Wernerson started off his career with Åtvidabergs FF, and witnessed the team win the 1972 and 1973 Allsvenskan seasons as a youth player before being promoted to the senior team in 1975. He spent a total of six seasons at Åtvidaberg, and helped the team win promotion back to Allsvenskan in 1977 after having been relegated in 1976. He was also a part of the Åtvidaberg team that reached the final of the 1978–79 Svenska Cupen, losing to IFK Göteborg.

=== IFK Göteborg ===
Wernerson was signed to IFK Göteborg by Sven-Göran Eriksson after the 1980 Allsvenskan season. He made his IFK Göteborg debut in a 1981 Allsvenskan game against GIF Sundsvall. He went on to help the team win four Swedish championships (1982, 1983, 1984, and 1987), two Svenska Cupen titles (1981–82 and 1982–83), and most notably two UEFA Cup titles (1981–82 and 1986–87). He was also a part of the IFK Göteborg team that reached the semi-finals in the 1985–86 European Cup before being eliminated by FC Barcelona.

After having been the first-choice goalkeeper for IFK Göteborg from 1981 until 1987, he retired from competitive football in 1988. In total Wernerson spent seven seasons as a player with IFK Göteborg, appearing in 370 games including friendly games in which he also scored one goal. He kept a clean sheet in 18 European games for IFK Göteborg, which is a club record.

== International career ==
Wernerson made his full international debut for Sweden in a Euro 1980 qualifier against Luxembourg on 23 October 1979. He went on to mostly serve as back-up goalkeeper for Thomas Ravelli during his international career. He made his ninth and ultimately last international appearance on 18 November 1985 in a 1986 FIFA World Cup qualifier against Malta.

== Career statistics ==
=== Club ===
Appearances and goals by club, season and competition
Club	Season	Division	League		Svenska Cupen		Other (Note: Includes UEFA competitions, Allsvenskan play-offs)		Total	
Club	Season	Division	Apps	Goals	Apps	Goals	Apps	Goals	Apps	Goals
Åtvidabergs FF	1975	Allsvenskan								
Åtvidabergs FF	1976	Allsvenskan								
Åtvidabergs FF	1977	Division 2 Södra								
Åtvidabergs FF	1978	Allsvenskan								
Åtvidabergs FF	1979	Allsvenskan								
Åtvidabergs FF	1980	Allsvenskan								
Åtvidabergs FF	Total		127	0					127	0
IFK Göteborg	1981	Allsvenskan	25	0	3	0	6	0	34	0
IFK Göteborg	1982	Allsvenskan	22	0	5	0	14	0	41	0
IFK Göteborg	1983	Allsvenskan	20	0	4	0	8	0	32	0
IFK Göteborg	1984	Allsvenskan	22	0	3	0	11	0	36	0
IFK Göteborg	1985	Allsvenskan	22	0	3	0	9	0	34	0
IFK Göteborg	1986	Allsvenskan	20	0	5	0	11	0	36	0
IFK Göteborg	1987	Allsvenskan	22	0	2	0	12	0	36	0
IFK Göteborg	Total		153	0	25	0	71	0	249	0
Career total			280	0	25	0	71	0	376	0

=== International ===
Appearances and goals by national team and year
National team	Year	Apps	Goals
Sweden	1979	2	0
Sweden	1980	3	0
Sweden	1981	1	0
Sweden	1982	1	0
Sweden	1983	0	0
Sweden	1984	0	0
Sweden	1985	2	0
Total		9	0

== Honours ==
IFK Göteborg

- UEFA Cup: 1981–82, 1986–87
- Swedish Champion: 1982, 1983, 1984, 1987
- Svenska Cupen: 1981–82, 1982–83

Individual

- Stor Grabb: 1983
- Årets Ärkeängel: 1985
