= Conny Klack =

Swedish footballer

Conny Klack, born 1940, is a Swedish footballer who played in Sandvikens IF before being transferred to GIF Sundsvall. He was a strong full-back and a part of the team that took GIF Sundsvall to the Swedish premier division in 1965. After his years in GIF Sundsvall, he played for local rival IFK Sundsvall.
