= John Carpenter (referee) =

Irish football referee (1936–2021)

- Full name: John Walter Carpenter
- Born: 22 August 1936; Donnycarney, Dublin, Ireland
- Died: 30 May 2021 (aged 84); Clontarf, Dublin, Ireland
- Other occupation: Butcher

Domestic
Years	League	Role
1964–1984	League of Ireland	Referee

International
Years	League	Role
1969–1984	FIFA listed	Referee

John Walter Carpenter (22 August 1936 – 30 May 2021) was an Irish professional football referee who officiated primarily in the League of Ireland from 1964 to 1984, as well as for FIFA as a FIFA international referee from 1969 to 1984.

== Career ==
Carpenter took up refereeing in the early 1960s when his playing career with St Patrick's Athletic was cut short by a broken leg. He progressed through the Dublin & District Schoolboys' League, the Leinster Junior League and the Athletic Union League before joining the League of Ireland panel in 1964.

Carpenter also had a distinguished career in European club competitions, refereeing 37 matches and culminating in the 1982 UEFA Cup Final. He also refereed 15 full international matches between 1970 and 1983; however, he failed to make the referee panel for the 1974 FIFA World Cup, instead being selected as a reserve referee. When the North American Soccer League was launched, Carpenter was one of a small number of European referees who were invited to officiate.

== Personal life ==
Carpenter was born in Donnycarney, Dublin and originally worked as a butcher with Olhausen's in Talbot Street. He died at his Clontarf home on 30 May 2021, aged 84.
