= Torbjörn Nilsson =

Swedish footballer (born 1954)

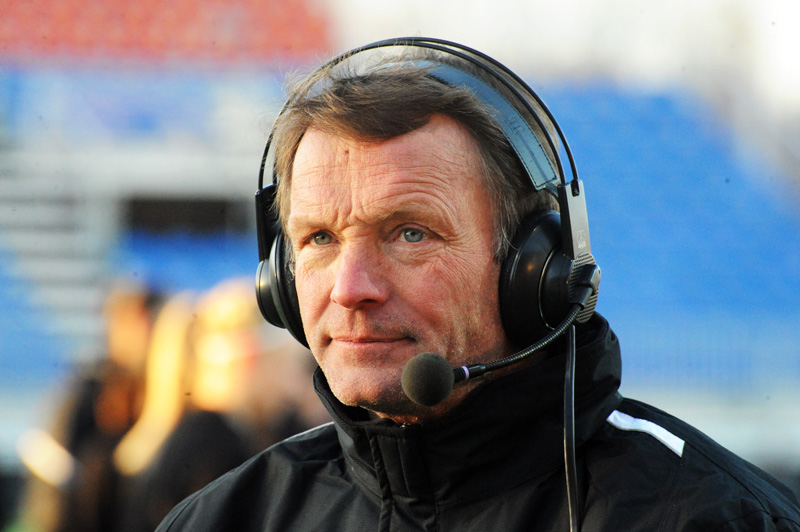
- Nilsson in 2014

Personal information
- Full name: Torbjörn Anders Nilsson
- Date of birth: 9 July 1954 (age 72)
- Place of birth: Västerås, Sweden
- Height: 1.90 m (6 ft 3 in)
- Position: Forward

Youth career
- 1966–1970: Jonsereds IF

Senior career*
Years	Team	Apps	(Gls)
1971–1974	Jonsereds IF	80	(50)
1975–1976	IFK Göteborg	49	(34)
1976–1977	PSV Eindhoven	11	(2)
1977–1982	IFK Göteborg	114	(62)
1982–1984	1. FC Kaiserslautern	65	(22)
1984–1986	IFK Göteborg	49	(31)
1986–1990	Jonsereds IF	40	(14)
Total		408	(215)

International career
1975–1980	Sweden U21	8	(2)
1976–1985	Sweden	28	(9)

Managerial career
- 1988–1990: Jonsereds IF
- 1991–1993: Örgryte IS
- 1994–1995: IK Oddevold
- 1997–1999: Västra Frölunda IF
- 2001: BK Häcken
- 2002–2004: Sweden U-21
- 2008–2013: Kopparbergs/Göteborg FC
- 2017: IFK Göteborg (assistant coach)
- * Club domestic league appearances and goals

Torbjörn Anders Nilsson (born 9 July 1954) is a Swedish former football player and manager. A forward, he is considered one of the best Swedish footballers of all time. He is best remembered for his time with IFK Göteborg with which he won two Swedish championship titles, the 1981–82 UEFA Cup, and reached the semi-finals of the 1985–86 European Cup. He also represented PSV Eindhoven in the Netherlands and 1. FC Kaiserslautern in Germany during a career that spanned between 1971 and 1990. A full international between 1976 and 1985, he won 28 caps for the Sweden national team and scored nine goals. He represented his country at the 1978 FIFA World Cup and was the 1982 recipient of Guldbollen.

== Playing career ==
Nilsson was born in Västerås on 9 July 1954, and raised in Hallstahammar. He and his family (father Göte, mother Daisy, the brothers Rolf and Bosse and sister Rose-Marie) moved to Partille, outside Gothenburg, before he started school, and he began his footballing career in Jonsereds IF at the age of seven or eight. Nilsson joined IFK Göteborg for the 1975 season, and helped the club climb back to the top tier of Swedish football, Allsvenskan, by winning Division 2 in 1976. He tried his luck abroad with PSV Eindhoven, but returned to IFK after only one season. He then helped the team to a treble in 1982, the Swedish championship (IFK won both Allsvenskan and the title-deciding play-off), Svenska Cupen, and the UEFA Cup. He was awarded Guldbollen, the Swedish footballer of the year award, for his heroics.

Nilsson moved to Kaiserslautern in Germany, where he played two seasons, and was about to move to Benfica when his former Göteborg manager Sven-Göran Eriksson left that club. Instead, Nilsson moved home to Gothenburg and his former club. When he ended his playing career after three seasons due to knee problems, Nilsson had led the club to another Swedish Championship, and nearly a European Cup final in 1986. IFK was eliminated by FC Barcelona after having won the home leg 3–0. They lost the away match by the same score. Nilsson still regrets not taking a penalty in the ensuing penalty shootout, which forced two young and inexperienced players — Roland Nilsson and Per Edmund Mordt — to the spot. Both missed their penalties.

Despite Nilsson's so-so stays abroad, and his short career in the Sweden national team – for whom he played only 28 matches and scored nine goals – he is considered to be one of the greatest Swedish footballers of all time. He declined to play for the national team for four years in the early 1980s when he was at his prime, the most important reason for this was that Nilsson not felt comfortable in the national team and the coach Lars Arnesson, who mixtured a lot with different formations, which did not suit the playing style that Nilsson liked. He instead concentrated on his club team, but made a comeback in the national team in 1984, scoring a goal in the 3–1 win against Portugal in the 1986 World Cup qualification. Nilsson was elected to the Swedish football Hall of Fame in 2003.

In a March 2020 Sky Sports interview, Sven-Göran Eriksson said that Nilsson was the best striker he had ever managed.

== Coaching career ==
After ending his professional playing career, Torbjörn Nilsson acted as playing manager for his youth club Jonsereds IF, before becoming manager of Örgryte IS, then in Division 1, in 1991. The club was relegated to Division 2, but managed to advance two divisions into Allsvenskan the next year, thanks to the Swedish league system at the time. The luck did not last, however, and Örgryte was relegated from the highest league in 1993. Nilsson moved to IK Oddevold from Uddevalla, and brought the club to Allsvenskan for the first time in its history in 1995. He left his job after the season and did not take a new one for a year.

He then took the job as manager of Västra Frölunda IF in 1997, and for the third time coached a team to a promotion to Allsvenskan. He stayed as manager for Västra Frölunda for two seasons and led the club to a fifth and seventh place, the two best seasonal results the club has enjoyed. He took another one-year break before starting his fourth spell as manager for a Gothenburg club, BK Häcken, in 2001. He only stayed for one year, not being able to keep the club in the highest league. Instead he became the manager of the Sweden under-21 team, leading the team through a successful qualification to the 2004 UEFA U-21 Championship, where the team narrowly lost the semi-final and third place matches after penalty shootouts and extra time, respectively. He did not coach any team between 2004 and 2008, but then resumed his managerial career in Gothenburg's best women's team, Kopparbergs/Göteborg FC.

== Career statistics ==
=== Club ===
Appearances and goals by club, season and competition
Club	Season	League			National cup		Europe		Other		Total	
Club	Season	Division	Apps	Goals	Apps	Goals	Apps	Goals	Apps	Goals	Apps	Goals
Jonsereds IF	1971											
Jonsereds IF	1972											
Jonsereds IF	1973											
Jonsereds IF	1974											
Jonsereds IF	Total		80	50			0	0			80	50
IFK Göteborg	1975	Allsvenskan	25	14	2	0	0	0	15	11	42	26
IFK Göteborg	1976	Allsvenskan	24	20	1	3	0	0	23	25	48	48
IFK Göteborg	Total		49	34	3	3	0	0	38	36	90	74
PSV Eindhoven	1976–77	Eredivisie	11	2			0	0			11	2
IFK Göteborg	1977	Allsvenskan	6	3	2	1	0	0	4	1	12	5
IFK Göteborg	1978	Allsvenskan	25	8	5	7	0	0	15	16	45	31
IFK Göteborg	1979	Allsvenskan	25	11	5	6	4 (Note: UEFA Cup Winners' Cup matches only)	0	15	10	49	27
IFK Göteborg	1980	Allsvenskan	25	14	4	1	4 (Note: UEFA Cup Winners' Cup (2 matches, 1 goal) and UEFA Cup (2 matches, 3 goals))	4	18	14	51	33
IFK Göteborg	1981	Allsvenskan	26	20	3	4	6 (Note: UEFA Cup matches only)	7	19	18	54	49
IFK Göteborg	1982	Allsvenskan	7	6	2	3	6	2	14	17	29	28
IFK Göteborg	Total		114	62	21	22	20	13	85	76	240	173
1. FC Kaiserslautern	1982–83	Bundesliga	33	9	0	0	8	4	–		41	13
1. FC Kaiserslautern	1983–84	Bundesliga	32	13	2	1	2	2	–		36	16
1. FC Kaiserslautern	Total		65	22	12	7	10	6			87	35
IFK Göteborg	1984	Allsvenskan	17 (Note: Allsvenskan (11 matches, 9 goals) and Allsvenskan play-off (6 matches, 5 goals))	14	2	2	4 (Note: European Cup matches only)	6	9	6	32	28
IFK Göteborg	1985	Allsvenskan	22 (Note: Allsvenskan (18 matches, 8 goals) and Allsvenskan play-off (4 matches, 0 goals))	8	3	2	6	6	17	11	48	27
IFK Göteborg	1986	Allsvenskan	10	9	3	1	4	2	17	15	34	27
IFK Göteborg	Total		49	31	8	5	14	14	43	32	114	82
Jonsereds IF	1986											
Jonsereds IF	1987											
Jonsereds IF	1988											
Jonsereds IF	1989											
Jonsereds IF	1990											
Jonsereds IF	Total		40	14			0	0			40	14
Career total			277	149	46	38	44	33	166	144	533	365

=== International ===
Appearances and goals by national team and year
National team	Year	Apps	Goals
Sweden	1976	4	1
Sweden	1977	2	0
Sweden	1978	5	1
Sweden	1979	2	4
Sweden	1980	4	0
Sweden	1981	4	2
Sweden	1982	0	0
Sweden	1983	0	0
Sweden	1984	1	1
Sweden	1985	6	0
Total		28	9

Scores and results list Sweden's goal tally first, score column indicates score after each Nilsson goal.

List of international goals scored by Torbjörn Nilsson
No.	Date	Venue	Opponent	Score	Result	Competition	Ref.
1	11 August 1976	Malmö Stadium, Malmö, Sweden	Finland	5–0	6–0	1972–77 Nordic Football Championship	
2	28 June 1978	Ryavallen, Örebro, Sweden	Finland	1–0	2–1	1978–80 Nordic Football Championship	
3	14 November 1979	Merdeka Stadium, Kuala Lumpur, Malaysia	Malaysia	1–0	3–1	Friendly	
4	17 November 1979	National Stadium, Singapore	Singapore	1–0	5–0	Friendly	
5	17 November 1979	National Stadium, Singapore	Singapore	4–0	5–0	Friendly	
6	17 November 1979	National Stadium, Singapore	Singapore	5–0	5–0	Friendly	
7	28 February 1981	Lahtis Storhall, Lahti, Finland	Norway	1–2	4–2	Friendly	
8	1 March 1981	Lahtis Storhall, Lahti, Finland	Finland	1–2	1–2	Friendly	
9	14 November 1984	Alvalade Stadium, Lisbon, Portugal	Portugal	3–1	3–1	1986 FIFA World Cup qualification	

== Honours ==
IFK Göteborg

- UEFA Cup: 1981–82
- Swedish Champion: 1982, 1984
- Svenska Cupen: 1978–1979, 1981–82

Individual

- Guldbollen: 1982
- Allsvenskan top scorer: 1981
- European Cup top scorer: 1984–85 (7 goals, shared with Michel Platini), 1985–86 (7 goals)
- UEFA Cup top scorer: 1981–82 (9 goals)
- Årets ärkeängel: 1979

== Notes ==
- Alsiö, Martin; Frantz, Alf; Lindahl, Jimmy; et al., eds. (2004). 100 år: Svenska fotbollförbundets jubileumsbok 1904–2004, del 2: statistiken. Vällingby: Stroemberg Media Group. ISBN 91-86184-59-8.
