= 1980–81 DDR-Oberliga =

DDR-Oberliga
- Season: 1980–81
- Champions: BFC Dynamo
- Relegated: Stahl Riesa; BSG Chemie Böhlen
- European Cup: BFC Dynamo
- European Cup Winners' Cup: 1. FC Lokomotive Leipzig
- UEFA Cup: FC Carl Zeiss Jena; 1. FC Magdeburg; Dynamo Dresden
- Matches: 182
- Goals: 621 (3.41 per match)
- Top goalscorer: Joachim Streich (20)
- Total attendance: 2,265,400
- Average attendance: 12,445

The 1980–81 DDR-Oberliga was the 32nd season of the DDR-Oberliga, the first tier of league football in East Germany.

The league was contested by fourteen teams. BFC Dynamo won the championship, the club's third of ten consecutive East German championships from 1978 to 1988.

Joachim Streich of 1. FC Magdeburg was the league's top scorer with 20 goals, while Hans-Ulrich Grapenthin of FC Carl Zeiss Jena took out the seasons East German Footballer of the year award.

On the strength of the 1980–81 title BFC Dynamo qualified for the 1981–82 European Cup where the club was knocked out by Aston Villa in the second round. Sixth-placed club 1. FC Lokomotive Leipzig qualified for the 1981–82 European Cup Winners' Cup as the seasons FDGB-Pokal winners and lost to FC Barcelona in the quarter finals. Second-placed FC Carl Zeiss Jena qualified for the 1981–82 UEFA Cup where it was knocked out in the second round by Real Madrid while third-placed 1. FC Magdeburg lost to Borussia Mönchengladbach in the first round and fourth-placed Dynamo Dresden was eliminated by Feyenoord Rotterdam in the second round.

== Table ==
The 1980–81 season saw two newly promoted clubs F.C. Hansa Rostock and BSG Chemie Böhlen.

Pos	Team	Pld	W	D	L	GF	GA	GD	Pts	Qualification or relegation
1	Berliner FC Dynamo (C)	26	17	5	4	74	31	+43	39	Qualification to European Cup first round
2	FC Carl Zeiss Jena	26	16	4	6	57	29	+28	36	Qualification to UEFA Cup first round
3	1. FC Magdeburg	26	15	4	7	58	35	+23	34	Qualification to UEFA Cup first round
4	SG Dynamo Dresden	26	16	2	8	49	37	+12	34	Qualification to UEFA Cup first round
5	FC Vorwärts Frankfurt	26	13	5	8	58	40	+18	31	
6	1. FC Lokomotive Leipzig	26	12	4	10	46	35	+11	28	Qualification to Cup Winners' Cup first round
7	FC Rot-Weiss Erfurt	26	10	7	9	37	49	−12	27	
8	Hallescher FC Chemie	26	11	3	12	41	41	0	25	
9	FC Karl-Marx-Stadt	26	6	9	11	37	54	−17	21	
10	F.C. Hansa Rostock	26	6	8	12	35	47	−12	20	
11	BSG Sachsenring Zwickau	26	7	4	15	32	51	−19	18	
12	BSG Wismut Aue	26	7	4	15	34	60	−26	18	
13	BSG Stahl Riesa (R)	26	6	5	15	38	64	−26	17	Relegation to DDR-Liga
14	BSG Chemie Böhlen (R)	26	5	6	15	25	48	−23	16	Relegation to DDR-Liga

(C) Champions; (R) Relegated

== Results ==
Home \ Away	BFC	CZJ	CHB	DRE	HFC	HRO	KMS	LOK	MAG	RWE	SZW	STR	VFO	AUE
BFC Dynamo		2–1	2–0	2–1	3–0	4–0	5–0	3–0	1–1	7–1	2–0	4–1	1–2	5–1
Carl Zeiss Jena	2–2		3–1	2–0	3–1	1–0	5–0	2–1	2–3	1–2	5–0	1–0	1–1	2–0
Chemie Böhlen	2–2	1–3		0–2	0–1	2–2	1–1	2–0	2–3	1–1	2–0	1–1	3–2	1–0
Dynamo Dresden	3–1	3–2	2–1		3–2	4–0	2–0	2–1	3–1	2–2	3–2	1–2	3–1	3–0
Hallescher FC Chemie	2–1	0–1	2–0	4–2		2–1	4–1	1–0	1–1	2–3	4–2	3–1	2–3	2–1
Hansa Rostock	4–4	1–3	2–0	1–1	1–1		1–1	2–2	1–0	1–1	1–3	6–2	1–0	4–1
Karl-Marx-Stadt	1–2	3–2	2–1	1–2	2–2	2–0		6–1	1–1	1–1	1–1	5–4	1–1	0–0
Lokomotive Leipzig	0–1	0–0	2–0	2–1	3–1	1–2	3–1		1–1	4–1	0–0	3–0	6–1	6–1
1. FC Magdeburg	2–4	3–1	2–0	1–2	1–0	3–1	4–0	4–1		1–2	3–2	5–1	4–1	4–1
Rot-Weiß Erfurt	3–3	0–0	0–2	0–1	1–0	3–1	3–2	1–0	2–5		2–1	2–0	1–3	2–2
Sachsenring Zwickau	1–3	0–3	2–2	3–0	0–3	2–0	1–0	0–3	0–1	2–0		5–1	0–2	3–2
Stahl Riesa	1–4	3–5	4–0	0–2	2–0	1–0	3–3	1–2	2–1	0–1	0–0		1–1	2–2
Vorwärts Frankfurt (Oder)	2–1	1–2	4–0	3–0	1–0	2–2	4–1	1–2	1–2	4–1	6–1	5–2		5–1
Wismut Aue	0–5	1–4	3–0	3–1	4–1	1–0	0–1	0–2	2–1	3–1	2–1	2–3	1–1	

Legend: Blue = home team win; Yellow = draw; Red = away team win.
