= Mario Relmy =

Guadeloupean footballer (born 1960)

Personal information
- Date of birth: 7 May 1960 (age 66)
- Place of birth: Pointe-à-Pitre, Guadeloupe
- Height: 1.82 m (5 ft 11 1/2 in)
- Position: Striker

Senior career*
Years	Team	Apps	(Gls)
1980–1983	Bordeaux	6	(0)
1982–1987	Rennes	112	(43)
1983–1984	→ Limoges (loan)	33	(23)
1987–1988	Chamois Niortais	35	(4)
1988–1990	Metz	29	(6)
1990–1992	Dijon	24	(6)
1992–1994	Le Tampon	?	(?)
- * Club domestic league appearances and goals

Mario Relmy (born 7 May 1960) is a former professional footballer who played as a striker.
