= IFK Sundsvall =

Swedish football club

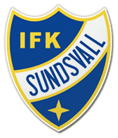
- Full name: Idrottsföreningen Kamraterna Sundsvall
- Founded: 22 February 1895
- Ground: Baldershovs IP; Sundsvall; Sweden
- Capacity: 5,000
- Chairman: Tomas Sandström
- League: Division 4 Medelpad
Home colours	Away colours

IFK Sundsvall is a Swedish football club located in Sundsvall. The club was formed on 22 February 1895.

== Background ==
Since their foundation IFK Sundsvall has participated mainly in the upper and middle divisions of the Swedish football league system. They have spent five seasons in the Allsvenskan from 1976 to 1977 and 1979–81. The nearest they have come to premier status since was in 1992 when they played in the Kvalsvenskan after progressing from Division 1 Norra. The club currently plays in Division 2 Norra Svealand which is the fourth tier of Swedish football. They play their home matches at the Baldershovs IP in Sundsvall.

IFK Sundsvall are affiliated to the Medelpads Fotbollförbund.

== Season to season ==
Season	Level	Division	Section	Position	Movements
1970	Tier 3	Division 3	Södra Norrland Nedre	4th	
1971	Tier 3	Division 3	Södra Norrland Övre	1st	Promotion Playoff – Promoted
1972	Tier 2	Division 2	Norra	7th	
1973	Tier 2	Division 2	Norra	3rd	
1974	Tier 2	Division 2	Norra	3rd	
1975	Tier 2	Division 2	Norra	1st	Promoted
1976	Tier 1	Allsvenskan		12th	
1977	Tier 1	Allsvenskan		13th	Relegated
1978	Tier 2	Division 2	Norra	1st	Promoted
1979	Tier 1	Allsvenskan		9th	
1980	Tier 1	Allsvenskan		7th	
1981	Tier 1	Allsvenskan		13th	Relegated
1982	Tier 2	Division 2	Norra	4th	
1983	Tier 2	Division 2	Norra	7th	
1984	Tier 2	Division 2	Norra	12th	Relegated
1985	Tier 3	Division 3	Södra Norrland	1st	Promotion Playoff
1986	Tier 3	Division 3	Mellersta Norrland	2nd	
1987	Tier 3	Division 2	Norra	9th	
1988	Tier 3	Division 2	Norra	13th	Relegated
1989	Tier 4	Division 3	Mellersta Norrland	1st	Promoted
1990	Tier 3	Division 2	Norra	1st	Promoted
1991	Tier 2	Division 1	Norra	6th	Spring Competition
	Tier 2	Division 1	Norra	4th	Autumn Competition
1992	Tier 2	Division 1	Norra	1st	Spring Competition
	Tier 2	Division 1	Kvalsvenskan	8th	Autumn Competition
1993	Tier 2	Division 1	Norra	13th	Relegated
1994	Tier 3	Division 2	Östra Svealand	9th	
1995	Tier 3	Division 2	Norrland	2nd	Promotion Playoffs – Not Promoted
1996	Tier 3	Division 2	Norrland	6th	
1997	Tier 3	Division 2	Norrland	11th	Relegated
1998	Tier 4	Division 3	Mellersta Norrland	4th	
1999	Tier 4	Division 3	Mellersta Norrland	3rd	
2000	Tier 4	Division 3	Mellersta Norrland	8th	
2001	Tier 4	Division 3	Mellersta Norrland	4th	
2002	Tier 4	Division 3	Mellersta Norrland	2nd	Promotion Playoffs
2003	Tier 4	Division 3	Mellersta Norrland	5th	
2004	Tier 4	Division 3	Mellersta Norrland	7th	
2005	Tier 4	Division 3	Mellersta Norrland	4th	Promotion Playoffs – Promoted
2006*	Tier 4	Division 2	Norrland	8th	
2007	Tier 4	Division 2	Norrland	11th	Relegated
2008	Tier 5	Division 3	Mellersta Norrland	4th	
2009	Tier 5	Division 3	Mellersta Norrland	2nd	Promotion Playoffs – Promoted
2010	Tier 4	Division 2	Norra Svealand	12th	Relegated
2011	Tier 5	Division 3	Mellersta Norrland	5th	
2012	Tier 5	Division 3	Mellersta Norrland	9th	Relegation Playoffs – Not Relegated
2013	Tier 5	Division 3	Sodra Norrland	10th	Relegation Playoffs – Relegated
2014	Tier 6	Division 4	Medelpad	3rd	
2015	Tier 6	Division 4	Medelpad	4th	
2016	Tier 6	Division 4	Medelpad	4th	
2017	Tier 6	Division 4	Medelpad	4th	
2018	Tier 6	Division 4	Medelpad	10th	Relegated
2019	Tier 7	Division 5	Medelpad	2nd	Promoted
2020	Tier 6	Division 4	Medelpad	7th	
2021	Tier 6	Division 4	Medelpad	5th	
2022	Tier 6	Division 4	Medelpad	5th	
2023	Tier 6	Division 4	Medelpad	4th	
2024	Tier 6	Division 4	Medelpad		

* League restructuring in 2006 resulted in a new division being created at Tier 3 and subsequent divisions dropping a level.

== Achievements ==
- Division 1 Norra:
  - Winners (1): 1992

== Attendances ==
In recent seasons IFK Sundsvall have had the following average attendances:

Season	Average attendance	Division / Section	Level
2005	124	Div 3 Mellersta Norrland	Tier 4
2006	251	Div 2 Norrland	Tier 4
2007	143	Div 2 Norrland	Tier 4
2008	133	Div 3 Mellersta Norrland	Tier 5
2009	143	Div 3 Mellersta Norrland	Tier 5
2010	191	Div 2 Norra Svealand	Tier 4
2011	143	Div 3 Mellersta Norrland	Tier 5
2012	?	Div 3 Mellersta Norrland	Tier 5
2013	?	Div 3 Sodra Norrland	Tier 5
2014	79	Div 4 Medelpad	Tier 5
2015	72	Div 4 Medelpad	Tier 5
2016	?	Div 4 Medelpad	Tier 5
2017	78	Div 4 Medelpad	Tier 5
2018		Div 4 Medelpad	Tier 5

* Attendances are provided in the Publikliga sections of the Svenska Fotbollförbundet website.

The attendance record for IFK Sundsvall was 10,650 spectators for the match against IFK Norrköping in the Allsvenskan on 16 May 1976.
