= Karl Berger (footballer) =

German footballer

Personal information
- Date of birth: 13 June 1951 (age 75)
- Place of birth: Stuttgart, West Germany
- Position: Forward

Youth career
- Fellbach
- 1969-1971: VfB Stuttgart Amateure

Senior career*
Years	Team	Apps	(Gls)
1971–1974	VfB Stuttgart	29	(4)
1974–1978	Karlsruher SC	115	(32)
1978–1979	Fortuna Köln	5	(0)
1979–1982	Winterslag		
1982–1983	Thor Waterschei		
1983–1984	Schaffhausen		

Managerial career
- 1984–1986: Schaffhausen
- 1986–1987: Baden
- * Club domestic league appearances and goals

Karl Berger (born 13 June 1951) is a German former football player and coach who played as a forward.
