= Dan Corneliusson =

Swedish footballer (born 1961)

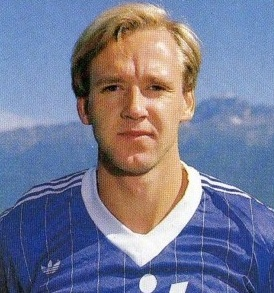
- Corneliusson with Como in 1985

Personal information
- Full name: Mats Dan Erling Corneliusson
- Date of birth: 2 October 1961 (age 65)
- Place of birth: Trollhättan, Sweden
- Height: 1.82 m (6 ft 0 in)
- Position: Striker

Senior career*
Years	Team	Apps	(Gls)
1978–1983	IFK Göteborg	62	(29)
1983–1984	VfB Stuttgart	28	(12)
1984–1989	Como	112	(18)
1989–1990	FC Wettingen	27	(9)
1990–1992	Malmö FF	36	(9)
1993	Qviding FIF	0	(0)
1994–1995	Karlstad BK	17	(4)
Total		282	(81)

International career
1978	Sweden U17	3	(4)
1978–1979	Sweden U19	17	(6)
1981–1982	Sweden U21	4	(0)
1982–1990	Sweden	22	(12)
- * Club domestic league appearances and goals

Mats Dan Erling Corneliusson (born 2 October 1961) is a Swedish former professional footballer who played as a striker. He represented IFK Göteborg, VfB Stuttgart, Como, FC Wettingen, Malmö FF, Qviding FF, and Karlstad BK during a career that spanned between 1978 and 1995. A full international between 1982 and 1990, he won 22 caps and scored 12 goals for the Sweden national team.

== Club career ==
Corneliusson is best remembered for his time with IFK Göteborg with which he won the UEFA Cup and was the 1982 Allsvenskan top scorer. He also represented VfB Stuttgart, with which he became the 1983–84 Bundesliga champion, Como, FC Wettingen, Malmö FF, Qviding FF, and Karlstad BK between 1978 and 1995.

== International career ==
A full international between 1982 and 1990, Corneliusson won 22 caps and scored 12 goals for the Sweden national team. He also represented the Sweden U17, U19, and U21 teams between 1978 and 1982.

== Career statistics ==
=== International ===
Appearances and goals by national team and year
National team	Year	Apps	Goals
Sweden	1982	3	1
Sweden	1983	8	6
Sweden	1984	3	1
Sweden	1985	3	3
Sweden	1986	2	0
Sweden	1987	1	0
Sweden	1988	0	0
Sweden	1989	0	0
Sweden	1990	2	1
Total		22	12

Scores and results list Sweden's goal tally first, score column indicates score after each Corneliusson goal.

List of international goals scored by Dan Corneliusson
No.	Date	Venue	Opponent	Score	Result	Competition	Ref.
1	13 November 1982	Makarios Athletic Center, Nicosia, Cyprus	Cyprus	1–0	1–0	UEFA Euro 1984 qualifying	
2	27 April 1983	Stadion Galgenwaard, Utrecht, Netherlands	Netherlands	1–0	3–0	Friendly	
3	27 April 1983	Stadion Galgenwaard, Utrecht, Netherlands	Netherlands	3–0	3–0	Friendly	
4	15 May 1983	Malmö Stadium, Malmö, Sweden	Cyprus	2–0	5–0	UEFA Euro 1984 qualifying	
5	22 June 1983	Ullevi, Gothenburg, Sweden	Brazil	1–1	3–3	Friendly	
6	22 June 1983	Ullevi, Gothenburg, Sweden	Brazil	2–1	3–3	Friendly	
7	21 September 1983	Råsunda Stadium, Solna, Sweden	Czechoslovakia	1–0	1–0	UEFA Euro 1984 qualifying	
8	23 May 1984	Norrköpings Idrottspark, Norrköping, Sweden	Malta	2–0	4–0	1986 FIFA World Cup qualifying	
9	11 September 1985	Parken, Copenhagen, Denmark	Denmark	2–0	3–0	Friendly	
10	25 September 1985	Råsunda Stadium, Solna, Sweden	West Germany	1–2	2–2	1986 FIFA World Cup qualifying	
11	16 October 1985	Stadion Evžena Rošického, Prague, Czechoslovakia	Czechoslovakia	1–0	1–2	1986 FIFA World Cup qualifying	
12	26 September 1990	Råsunda Stadium, Solna, Sweden	Bulgaria	1–0	2–0	Friendly	

== Honours ==
IFK Göteborg

- UEFA Cup: 1981–82
- Swedish Champion: 1982, 1983
- Svenska Cupen: 1978–79, 1981–82, 1982–83

VfB Stuttgart

- Bundesliga: 1983–84

Individual

- Allsvenskan top scorer: 1982
