= Glenn Schiller =

Swedish footballer (born 1960)

Personal information
- Full name: Glenn Jan Schiller
- Date of birth: 28 March 1960 (age 66)
- Position: Midfielder

Senior career*
Years	Team	Apps	(Gls)
1978–1986	IFK Göteborg	124	(16)
1986–1992	Djurgårdens IF	127	(2)
Total		251	(18)

International career
1979–1980	Sweden U21	3	(0)
- * Club domestic league appearances and goals

Glenn Jan Schiller (born 28 March 1960) is a Swedish former professional footballer who played as a midfielder for IFK Göteborg and Djurgårdens IF. He was in the IFK Göteborg 1981–82 UEFA Cup winning side.
