= Zvonko Breber =

Yugoslav footballer

Personal information
- Full name: Zvonko Breber
- Date of birth: 25 May 1952 (age 74)
- Place of birth: Zagreb, PR Croatia, FPR Yugoslavia
- Position: Midfielder

Senior career*
Years	Team	Apps	(Gls)
1970–1972	Dinamo Zagreb		
1972–1980	Maribor	214	(30)
1980–1984	Sturm Graz	122	(9)
1984–1985	Kapfenberger SV		

Managerial career
- 2016–2017: Maribor B
- 2018–2020: SV Flavia Solva
- 2020–: Dobrovce
- * Club domestic league appearances and goals

Zvonko Breber (born 25 May 1952) is a Yugoslav retired footballer who played as a midfielder.
