= Tord Holmgren =

Swedish footballer

Personal information
- Full name: Tord Holmgren
- Date of birth: 9 November 1957 (age 68)
- Place of birth: Palohuornas, Sweden
- Position: Midfielder

Senior career*
Years	Team	Apps	(Gls)
1977	Gällivare	17	(1)
1977–1987	IFK Göteborg	217	(22)
1990–1991	Fredrikstad	22	(4)
Total		256	(27)

International career
1979–1985	Sweden	26	(1)
- * Club domestic league appearances and goals

Tord Holmgren (born 9 November 1957) is a Swedish former footballer who played as a midfielder.

Holmgren won the UEFA Cup twice, in 1982 and 1987. He spent most of his career playing alongside his younger brother Tommy Holmgren for IFK Göteborg.

== Honours ==
Individual

- Årets ärkeängel: 1980
