= 1981 Allsvenskan =

57th season of Allsvenskan

Allsvenskan
- Season: 1981
- Champions: Östers IF
- Relegated: IFK Sundsvall; Djurgårdens IF
- European Cup: Östers IF
- UEFA Cup: IFK Göteborg; IFK Norrköping; IK Brage
- Top goalscorer: Torbjörn Nilsson, IFK Göteborg (20)
- Average attendance: 6,296

Statistics of Allsvenskan in season 1981.

== Overview ==
The league was contested by 14 teams, with Östers IF winning the championship.

== League table ==
Pos	Team	Pld	W	D	L	GF	GA	GD	Pts	Qualification or relegation
1	Östers IF (C)	26	19	2	5	57	20	+37	40	Qualification to European Cup first round
2	IFK Göteborg	26	15	6	5	60	24	+36	36	Qualification to Cup Winners' Cup first round (Note: IFK Göteborg qualified for the European Cup Winners' Cup as Svenska Cupen champions 1981–82.)
3	IFK Norrköping	26	12	8	6	40	30	+10	32	Qualification to UEFA Cup first round
4	IK Brage	26	11	8	7	34	27	+7	30	Qualification to UEFA Cup first round
5	Malmö FF	26	11	5	10	48	44	+4	27	
6	Örgryte IS	26	12	3	11	45	49	−4	27	
7	Hammarby IF	26	9	7	10	48	46	+2	25	
8	AIK	26	8	8	10	35	34	+1	24	
9	Halmstads BK	26	11	2	13	35	44	−9	24	
10	Åtvidabergs FF	26	8	6	12	28	35	−7	22	
11	IF Elfsborg (O)	26	7	8	11	27	38	−11	22	Qualification to Relegation play-offs
12	Kalmar FF (O)	26	9	3	14	28	38	−10	21	Qualification to Relegation play-offs
13	IFK Sundsvall (R)	26	6	6	14	24	58	−34	18	Relegation to Division 2
14	Djurgårdens IF (R)	26	6	4	16	25	47	−22	16	Relegation to Division 2

Rules for classification: 1) points; 2) goal difference; 3) number of goals scored.
(C) Champions; (O) Play-off winners; (R) Relegated

== Results ==
Home \ Away	AIK	DIF	HBK	HIF	IFE	IFKG	IFKN	IFKS	IKB	KFF	MFF	ÅFF	ÖIS	ÖIF
AIK		3–0	0–1	0–1	2–0	1–1	1–1	5–1	1–0	3–1	4–0	2–1	2–3	0–2
Djurgårdens IF	0–0		3–2	1–2	1–2	0–4	0–2	0–1	1–2	0–1	1–1	0–1	3–2	0–2
Halmstads BK	1–0	2–3		2–0	3–1	0–3	1–0	1–0	0–3	1–0	1–2	1–0	2–3	1–0
Hammarby IF	2–1	1–1	1–2		5–1	1–1	0–2	4–4	2–2	1–2	4–4	3–3	3–0	0–1
IF Elfsborg	2–2	1–1	1–1	3–2		1–1	3–2	2–0	2–2	1–3	0–0	0–1	1–0	0–2
IFK Göteborg	2–2	0–1	6–2	5–0	1–0		3–1	0–1	3–1	2–1	4–1	3–0	4–1	3–1
IFK Norrköping	1–1	2–0	2–0	1–3	1–1	1–0		5–1	0–0	0–1	3–1	1–0	1–0	2–2
IFK Sundsvall	1–3	0–2	2–1	1–1	0–0	0–5	2–2		0–2	4–1	2–1	1–1	0–3	0–4
IK Brage	0–0	2–4	2–0	1–0	2–1	1–2	0–0	0–0		3–0	1–0	2–0	4–2	0–0
Kalmar FF	1–0	1–0	1–1	5–1	1–2	2–2	2–4	1–2	0–0		1–2	1–0	2–1	0–2
Malmö FF	3–0	4–1	2–5	1–0	1–0	0–2	4–0	5–0	6–3	1–0		1–1	3–3	0–1
Åtvidabergs FF	1–1	3–0	2–1	0–3	0–1	1–1	1–2	3–1	0–1	1–0	3–2		3–1	1–2
Örgryte IS	3–1	3–1	4–2	1–5	1–0	2–1	2–2	2–0	1–0	1–0	3–1	1–1		1–3
Östers IF	5–0	3–1	3–1	1–3	3–1	2–1	1–2	4–0	2–0	3–0	1–2	3–0	4–1	

Legend: Blue = home team win; Yellow = draw; Red = away team win.

== Relegation play-offs ==
Häcken	0–1	Elfsborg

Kalmar FF	2–0	IFK Eskilstuna

Elfsborg	1–1	Häcken

IFK Eskilstuna	2–2	Kalmar FF

Elfsborg won 2–1 on aggregate. Kalmar FF won 4–2 on aggregate.

== Attendances ==
#	Club	Average attendance	Highest attendance
1	IFK Göteborg	12,627	40,072
2	Hammarby IF	8,308	16,642
3	Örgryte IS	8,048	34,426
4	IFK Norrköping	6,724	12,567
5	AIK	6,479	12,543
6	Malmö FF	6,212	14,937
7	IK Brage	6,087	9,572
8	IF Elfsborg	6,011	10,721
9	Östers IF	5,587	11,634
10	Halmstads BK	5,134	9,194
11	Djurgårdens IF	4,967	17,075
12	Kalmar FF	4,359	6,924
13	IFK Sundsvall	4,085	7,770
14	Åtvidabergs FF	3,497	5,912
