= Ulf Eriksson (referee) =

Swedish footballer and referee

- Full name: Ulf Helmer Johan Eriksson
- Born: 26 May 1942 (age 84); Sollefteå, Sweden

Domestic
Years	League	Role
–1989	Allsvenskan	Referee

International
Years	League	Role
1974–1989	FIFA listed	Referee

Ulf Helmer Johan "Utta" Eriksson (born 26 May 1942) is a retired football referee from Sollefteå, Sweden. He was a referee officiating at the 1978 FIFA World Cup, including the match between Argentina and Poland.
