= 1984 Allsvenskan =

60th season of Allsvenskan

Allsvenskan
- Season: 1984
- Champions: IFK Göteborg (Allsvenskan champions and Swedish champions after play-offs)
- Relegated: IF Elfsborg; Gefle IF
- European Cup: IFK Göteborg
- UEFA Cup: Malmö FF; Hammarby IF
- Top goalscorer: Billy Ohlsson, Hammarby IF (14)
- Average attendance: 6,072

Statistics of Allsvenskan in season 1984.

== Overview ==
The league was contested by 12 teams, with IFK Göteborg winning the league and the Swedish championship after the play-offs.

== League table ==
Pos	Team	Pld	W	D	L	GF	GA	GD	Pts	Qualification or relegation
1	IFK Göteborg (C, S)	22	14	4	4	43	19	+24	32	Allsvenskan play-offs, Qualification to European Cup first round
2	AIK	22	12	7	3	28	12	+16	31	Allsvenskan play-offs, Qualification to Cup Winners' Cup first round (Note: AIK qualified for the European Cup Winners' Cup as Svenska Cupen champions 1984–85.)
3	Malmö FF	22	11	5	6	47	24	+23	27	Allsvenskan play-offs, Qualification to UEFA Cup first round
4	Hammarby IF	22	11	4	7	42	30	+12	26	Allsvenskan play-offs, Qualification to UEFA Cup first round
5	IFK Norrköping	22	8	8	6	33	30	+3	24	Allsvenskan play-offs
6	IK Brage	22	7	6	9	21	25	−4	20	Allsvenskan play-offs
7	Kalmar FF	22	5	10	7	17	25	−8	20	Allsvenskan play-offs
8	Halmstads BK	22	7	5	10	18	26	−8	19	Allsvenskan play-offs
9	Örgryte IS	22	5	7	10	24	36	−12	17	
10	Östers IF	22	5	6	11	28	36	−8	16	
11	IF Elfsborg (R)	22	5	6	11	24	39	−15	16	Relegation to Division 2
12	Gefle IF (R)	22	4	8	10	21	44	−23	16	Relegation to Division 2

Rules for classification: 1) points; 2) goal difference; 3) number of goals scored.
(C) Allsvenskan Champion; (S) Swedish Champion; (R) Relegated

== Results ==
Home \ Away	AIK	GIF	HBK	HIF	IFE	IFKG	IFKN	IKB	KFF	MFF	ÖIS	ÖIF
AIK		2–0	1–0	1–0	0–1	0–0	3–1	1–0	0–0	0–1	2–1	1–1
Gefle IF	0–0		1–0	2–0	2–0	0–3	3–3	0–4	0–0	2–4	1–1	2–1
Halmstads BK	0–1	0–0		0–4	0–1	0–1	0–0	2–1	0–1	1–0	1–1	2–1
Hammarby IF	0–3	4–1	2–0		5–0	2–1	6–2	2–2	2–2	1–0	2–0	1–0
IF Elfsborg	1–3	2–2	1–2	0–3		2–3	1–2	5–0	0–0	2–1	1–1	2–6
IFK Göteborg	1–0	2–0	1–2	2–0	3–1		0–2	2–1	1–2	1–1	3–0	5–0
IFK Norrköping	1–1	3–0	1–2	4–1	2–2	0–3		0–0	2–0	1–0	2–1	1–1
IK Brage	1–2	1–0	2–1	0–0	0–0	2–2	2–1		1–0	0–1	0–1	3–0
Kalmar FF	1–4	1–1	0–0	2–1	1–2	1–1	1–0	0–0		1–1	2–0	1–1
Malmö FF	2–2	7–2	3–1	6–1	2–0	0–1	1–1	4–0	3–0		1–1	4–2
Örgryte IS	0–1	5–1	1–1	2–2	1–0	1–4	2–2	0–1	2–1	2–4		0–4
Östers IF	0–0	1–1	2–3	0–3	0–0	2–3	0–2	1–0	3–0	2–1	0–1	

Legend: Blue = home team win; Yellow = draw; Red = away team win.

== Allsvenskan play-offs ==
The 1984 Allsvenskan play-offs was the third edition of the competition. The eight best placed teams from Allsvenskan qualified to the competition. Allsvenskan champions IFK Göteborg won the competition and the Swedish championship after defeating IFK Norrköping who finished fifth in the league.

=== Quarter-finals ===
==== First leg ====
7 October 1984	Halmstad	0–0	IFK Göteborg	Örjans Vall, Halmstad

7 October 1984	IFK Norrköping	1–0	AIK	Idrottsparken, Norrköping

7 October 1984	Brage	1–0	Malmö FF	Domnarsvallen, Borlänge

7 October 1984	Kalmar FF	3–2	Hammarby	Fredriksskans, Kalmar

==== Second leg ====
10 October 1984	IFK Göteborg	2–1 (2–1 agg.)	Halmstad	Ullevi, Gothenburg

10 October 1984	AIK	2–1 (ag) (2–2 agg.)	IFK Norrköping	Råsunda, Solna

10 October 1984	Malmö FF	2–2 (2–3 agg.)	Brage	Malmö Stadion, Malmö

10 October 1984	Hammarby	3–0 (5–3 agg.)	Kalmar FF	Söderstadion, Stockholm

=== Semi-finals ===
==== First leg ====
21 October 1984	Brage	1–5	IFK Göteborg	Domnarvsvallen, Borlänge

21 October 1984	IFK Norrköping	0–0	Hammarby	Idrottsparken, Norrköping

==== Second leg ====
28 October 1984	IFK Göteborg	2–2 (7–3 agg.)	Brage	Ullevi, Gothenburg

28 October 1984	Hammarby	0–0 (a.e.t.) (0–0 agg.) (4 – 5 p)	IFK Norrköping	Söderstadion, Stockholm

=== Final ===
31 October 1984	IFK Norrköping	1–5	IFK Göteborg	Idrottsparken, Norrköping

3 November 1984	IFK Göteborg	2–0 (7–1 agg.)	IFK Norrköping	Nya Ullevi, Gothenburg

== Season statistics ==
=== Top scorers ===
Rank	Player	Club	Goals
1	(Sweden) Billy Ohlsson	Hammarby IF	14
2	(Sweden) Mats Magnusson	Malmö FF	13
3	(Sweden) Peter Truedsson	Östers IF	12
4	(Sweden) Lars Larsson	Malmö FF	9
4	(Sweden) Torbjörn Nilsson	IFK Göteborg	9
4	(Sweden) Håkan Sandberg	IFK Göteborg	9
4	(Sweden) Jan Hellström	IFK Norrköping	9
8	(Sweden) Thomas Ahlström	IF Elfsborg	8
8	(Sweden) Thomas Johansson	AIK	8
8	(Sweden) Mikael Rönnberg	Malmö FF	8
8	(Sweden) Peter Gerhardsson	Hammarby IF	8

== Attendances ==
No.	Club	Average attendance	Highest attendance
1	IFK Göteborg	10,283	22,407
2	AIK	7,618	26,990
3	Malmö FF	7,490	15,781
4	Hammarby IF	7,303	16,466
5	IFK Norrköping	6,145	10,277
6	Halmstads BK	5,307	12,864
7	Örgryte IS	5,197	17,614
8	IK Brage	4,777	6,944
9	Gefle IF	4,367	5,767
10	Kalmar FF	4,314	9,561
11	IF Elfsborg	4,164	6,710
12	Östers IF	3,161	8,766
