= 1982 Allsvenskan =

58th season of Allsvenskan

Allsvenskan
- Season: 1982
- Champions: IFK Göteborg (Allsvenskan champions and Swedish champions after play-offs)
- Relegated: Kalmar FF (play-offs); IFK Norrköping (play-offs); Åtvidabergs FF
- European Cup: IFK Göteborg
- UEFA Cup: Malmö FF; IF Elfsborg
- Top goalscorer: Dan Corneliusson, IFK Göteborg (12)
- Average attendance: 5,364

Statistics of Allsvenskan in season 1982.

== Overview ==
The league was contested by 12 teams, with IFK Göteborg winning the league and the Swedish championship after the playoffs.

== League table ==
Pos	Team	Pld	W	D	L	GF	GA	GD	Pts	Qualification or relegation
1	IFK Göteborg (C, S)	22	11	7	4	45	22	+23	29	Allsvenskan play-offs, Qualification to European Cup first round
2	Hammarby IF	22	12	4	6	42	27	+15	28	Allsvenskan play-offs, Qualification to Cup Winners' Cup first round (Note: Hammarby qualified for the European Cup Winners' Cup as Svenska Cupen runners-up 1982–83.)
3	IF Elfsborg	22	9	8	5	31	21	+10	26	Allsvenskan play-offs, Qualification to UEFA Cup first round
4	Malmö FF	22	7	11	4	23	15	+8	25	Allsvenskan play-offs, Qualification to UEFA Cup first round
5	Östers IF	22	10	4	8	28	20	+8	24	Allsvenskan play-offs
6	IK Brage	22	9	6	7	24	27	−3	24	Allsvenskan play-offs
7	Örgryte IS	22	7	7	8	27	28	−1	21	Allsvenskan play-offs
8	Halmstads BK	22	7	7	8	39	45	−6	21	Allsvenskan play-offs
9	Kalmar FF (R)	22	6	7	9	21	27	−6	19	Qualification to Relegation play-offs
10	IFK Norrköping (R)	22	5	9	8	28	38	−10	19	Qualification to Relegation play-offs
11	AIK (O)	22	4	10	8	21	31	−10	18	Qualification to Relegation play-offs
12	Åtvidabergs FF (R)	22	4	2	16	17	45	−28	10	Qualification to Relegation play-offs

Rules for classification: 1) points; 2) goal difference; 3) number of goals scored.
(C) Allsvenskan Champion; (S) Swedish Champion; (O) Play-off winners; (R) Relegated

== Results ==
Home \ Away	AIK	HBK	HIF	IFE	IFKG	IFKN	IKB	KFF	MFF	ÅFF	ÖIS	ÖIF
AIK		1–1	0–3	3–2	0–0	1–1	1–1	0–2	0–0	2–3	0–0	1–0
Halmstads BK	2–2		3–0	2–2	1–1	4–4	3–1	4–1	0–0	1–0	4–2	2–4
Hammarby IF	3–0	4–2		2–1	4–1	1–1	6–0	2–2	2–0	1–1	4–2	1–3
IF Elfsborg	1–2	5–2	0–1		0–0	2–2	1–0	2–0	0–1	3–1	2–1	3–1
IFK Göteborg	1–0	5–1	4–1	0–0		2–1	1–0	1–1	1–1	0–1	1–2	2–0
IFK Norrköping	2–3	0–1	1–1	1–2	1–6		2–1	2–1	0–4	2–0	1–1	2–1
IK Brage	1–1	3–2	1–0	0–0	1–3	3–0		0–0	2–2	3–0	1–0	1–0
Kalmar FF	1–0	4–1	2–0	0–0	1–4	0–0	0–2		0–2	1–0	1–2	1–0
Malmö FF	2–0	2–1	2–0	0–1	1–1	1–1	0–0	1–1		1–1	0–0	0–2
Åtvidabergs FF	3–2	0–2	0–3	0–2	2–8	0–2	1–2	1–0	0–2		0–1	0–1
Örgryte IS	0–0	4–0	1–2	2–2	0–2	1–1	0–1	2–1	1–1	4–3		1–0
Östers IF	2–2	0–0	0–1	0–0	3–1	2–1	4–0	1–1	1–0	2–0	1–0	

Legend: Blue = home team win; Yellow = draw; Red = away team win.

== Allsvenskan play-offs ==
The 1982 Allsvenskan play-offs was the first edition of the competition. The eight best placed teams from Allsvenskan qualified to the competition. Allsvenskan champions IFK Göteborg won the competition and the Swedish championship after defeating league runners-up Hammarby IF.

=== Quarter-finals ===
==== First leg ====
10 October 1982	Halmstad	1–1	IFK Göteborg	Örjans Vall, Halmstad
				Attendance: 5,983; Referee: Sven-Olof Thunman (Gävle)

10 October 1982	Örgryte	0–1	Hammarby	Ullevi, Gothenburg
				Attendance: 6,433; Referee: Bengt Jansson (Hallsberg)

10 October 1982	Brage	0–0	Elfsborg	Domnarvsvallen, Borlänge
				Attendance: 3,400; Referee: Bengt Helén (Uppsala)

10 October 1982	Öster	0–2	Malmö FF	Värendsvallen, Växjö
				Attendance: 4,102; Referee: Rune Larsson (Bandhagen)

==== Second leg ====
13 October 1982	IFK Göteborg	3–1 (4 – 2 agg.)	Halmstad	Ullevi, Gothenburg
				Attendance: 5,600; Referee: Sven-Erik Grönlund (Kvissleby)

13 October 1982	Hammarby	5–1 (6–1 agg.)	Örgryte	Söderstadion, Stockholm
				Attendance: 8,449; Referee: Hans Harrysson (Åhus)

13 October 1982	Elfsborg	2–0 (2–0 agg.)	Brage	Ryavallen, Borås
				Attendance: 5,003; Referee: Håkan Lundgren (Umeå)

13 October 1982	Malmö FF	1–2 (3–2 agg.)	Öster	Malmö Stadion, Malmö
				Attendance: 5,123; Referee: Ulf Eriksson (Sollefteå)

=== Semi-finals ===
==== First leg ====
17 October 1982	Malmö FF	0–3	IFK Göteborg	Malmö Stadion, Malmö
				Attendance: 5,606; Referee: Rolf Ericsson (Stockholm)

17 October 1982	Elfsborg	3–1	Hammarby	Ryavallen, Borås
				Attendance: 6,202; Referee: Bo Helén (Uppsala)

==== Second leg ====
24 October 1982	IFK Göteborg	5–1 (8–1 agg.)	Malmö FF	Ullevi, Gothenburg
				Attendance: 5,893; Referee: Erik Fredriksson (Tidaholm)

24 October 1982	Hammarby	3–0 (4–3 agg.)	Elfsborg	Söderstadion, Stockholm
				Attendance: 10,682; Referee: Ulf Eriksson (Sollefteå)

=== Final ===
27 October 1982 First leg	IFK Göteborg	1–2	Hammarby	Ullevi, Gothenburg
				Attendance: 16,908; Referee: Ulf Eriksson (Sollefteå)

31 October 1982 Second leg	Hammarby	1–3 (3–4 agg.)	IFK Göteborg	Söderstadion, Stockholm
				Attendance: 15,583; Referee: Erik Fredriksson (Tidaholm)

=== Relegation play-offs ===
10 October 1982

Gefle	2–0	Kalmar FF

Strömvallen, Gävle
16 October 1982

Kalmar FF	1–2	Gefle

Fredriksskans, Kalmar

9 October 1982

Häcken	2–0	IFK Norrköping

Rambergsvallen, Gothenburg
16 October 1982

IFK Norrköping	1–0	Häcken

Idrottsparken, Norrköping

10 October 1982

Djurgården	1–2	AIK

Stockholms Stadion, Stockholm
16 October 1982

AIK	2–2	Djurgården

Råsunda, Solna

10 October 1982

Mjällby	1–0	Åtvidaberg

Strandvallen, Hällevik
17 October 1982

Åtvidaberg	1–1	Mjällby

Kopparvallen, Åtvidaberg

== Season statistics ==
=== Top scorers ===
Rank	Player	Club	Goals
1	(Sweden) Dan Corneliusson	IFK Göteborg	12
2	(Sweden) Lars Gyllenvåg	IK Brage	10
2	(Sweden) Peter Andersson	Halmstads BK	10
4	(Sweden) Mats Jingblad	Halmstads BK	9
4	(Sweden) Jan Svensson	IFK Norrköping	9
4	(Sweden) Ulf Eriksson	Hammarby IF	9
7	(Sweden) Håkan Sandberg	IFK Göteborg	8
7	(Sweden) Peter Truedsson	Östers IF	8
7	(Sweden) Thomas Larsson	Örgryte IS	8
10	(Sweden) Jan Matsson	Östers IF	7
10	(Sweden) Thomas Sjöberg	Malmö FF	7
10	(Sweden) Frank Klarström	IF Elfsborg	7
10	(Sweden) Peter Gerhardsson	Hammarby IF	7

== Attendances ==
#	Club	Average	Highest
1	Hammarby IF	8,905	16,619
2	IFK Göteborg	8,483	29,544
3	Malmö FF	6,483	20,506
4	AIK	5,872	19,462
5	Örgryte IS	4,728	19,307
6	IK Brage	4,503	7,740
7	IF Elfsborg	4,422	6,485
8	Halmstads BK	4,388	6,805
9	IFK Norrköping	4,247	7,563
10	Kalmar FF	3,695	6,546
11	Östers IF	3,609	9,107
12	Åtvidabergs FF	2,315	3,203
