= Tommy Holmgren =

Swedish footballer

Personal information
- Date of birth: 9 January 1959 (age 67)
- Place of birth: Palohuornas, Sweden
- Position: Midfielder

Senior career*
Years	Team	Apps	(Gls)
1976	Gällivare SK	20	(6)
1977–1989	IFK Göteborg	213	(18)
Total		233	(24)

International career
1981–1986	Sweden	26	(0)
- * Club domestic league appearances and goals

Tommy Holmgren (born 9 January 1959) is a Swedish former footballer who played as a midfielder. Holmgren played his whole career for IFK Göteborg and won four Allsvenskan titles, three Swedish cups and two UEFA Cups with them. He also played several matches for Sweden's football team.

In a World Cup qualifier against Malta in 1984, Holmgren got kicked in the head by an opponent. He was out for a long time and when he came back he was not as good as he had been previously, before the incident many European clubs wanted to sign Holmgren but after it, nearly all of them stopped trying to sign him and he instead played on for Göteborg.

He is the younger brother of Tord Holmgren and they played together for several seasons. Holmgren is considered the best footballer of all time from Norrbotten along with Stig Sundqvist.

== Honours ==
Individual

- Årets Ärkeängel: 1986
