= 1980 Allsvenskan =

56th season of Allsvenskan

Allsvenskan
- Season: 1980
- Champions: Östers IF
- Relegated: Landskrona BoIS; Mjällby AIF
- European Cup: Östers IF
- UEFA Cup: Malmö FF; IFK Göteborg
- Top goalscorer: Billy Ohlsson, Hammarby IF (19)
- Average attendance: 6,285

Statistics of Allsvenskan in season 1980.

== Overview ==
The league was contested by 14 teams, with Östers IF winning the championship.

== League table ==
| Pos | Team | Pld | W | D | L | GF | GA | GD | Pts | Qualification or relegation |
|---|---|---|---|---|---|---|---|---|---|---|
| 1 | Östers IF (C) | 26 | 13 | 11 | 2 | 41 | 16 | +25 | 37 | Qualification to European Cup first round |
| 2 | Malmö FF | 26 | 13 | 9 | 4 | 37 | 22 | +15 | 35 | Qualification to UEFA Cup first round |
| 3 | IFK Göteborg | 26 | 12 | 10 | 4 | 45 | 26 | +19 | 34 | Qualification to UEFA Cup first round |
| 4 | IK Brage | 26 | 12 | 9 | 5 | 29 | 18 | +11 | 33 | |
| 5 | Hammarby IF | 26 | 11 | 8 | 7 | 49 | 31 | +18 | 30 | |
| 6 | IF Elfsborg | 26 | 8 | 12 | 6 | 32 | 26 | +6 | 28 | |
| 7 | IFK Sundsvall | 26 | 8 | 10 | 8 | 31 | 37 | −6 | 26 | |
| 8 | Halmstads BK | 26 | 8 | 9 | 9 | 32 | 28 | +4 | 25 | |
| 9 | Kalmar FF | 26 | 8 | 8 | 10 | 25 | 33 | −8 | 24 | Qualification to Cup Winners' Cup first round (Note: Kalmar FF qualified for the European Cup Winners' Cup as Svenska Cupen champions 1980–81.) |
| 10 | IFK Norrköping | 26 | 7 | 8 | 11 | 25 | 39 | −14 | 22 | |
| 11 | Åtvidabergs FF | 26 | 5 | 11 | 10 | 29 | 37 | −8 | 21 | |
| 12 | Djurgårdens IF | 26 | 7 | 7 | 12 | 24 | 37 | −13 | 21 | |
| 13 | Landskrona BoIS (R) | 26 | 5 | 7 | 14 | 26 | 46 | −20 | 17 | Relegation to Division 2 |
| 14 | Mjällby AIF (R) | 26 | 3 | 5 | 18 | 18 | 47 | −29 | 11 | Relegation to Division 2 |

Rules for classification: 1) points; 2) goal difference; 3) number of goals scored.
(C) Champions; (R) Relegated

== Results ==
| Home \ Away | DIF | HBK | HIF | IFE | IFKG | IFKN | IFKS | IKB | KFF | BOIS | MFF | MAIF | ÅFF | ÖIF |
|---|---|---|---|---|---|---|---|---|---|---|---|---|---|---|
| Djurgårdens IF | | 0–2 | 2–1 | 0–2 | 0–1 | 5–0 | 2–2 | 2–1 | 0–2 | 1–1 | 0–0 | 1–3 | 1–0 | 2–1 |
| Halmstads BK | 0–1 | | 2–4 | 2–2 | 1–1 | 2–0 | 3–0 | 1–1 | 0–1 | 2–1 | 2–2 | 2–1 | 1–1 | 0–1 |
| Hammarby IF | 1–1 | 2–0 | | 2–0 | 5–2 | 1–1 | 3–1 | 3–1 | 2–0 | 0–2 | 0–0 | 1–1 | 1–1 | 0–1 |
| IF Elfsborg | 1–1 | 1–0 | 2–2 | | 1–2 | 1–1 | 3–3 | 0–1 | 1–2 | 1–0 | 2–3 | 3–0 | 2–2 | 1–1 |
| IFK Göteborg | 1–0 | 1–1 | 2–0 | 0–0 | | 3–0 | 3–0 | 1–1 | 2–2 | 5–0 | 0–0 | 5–1 | 2–2 | 4–1 |
| IFK Norrköping | 4–0 | 2–1 | 0–5 | 0–1 | 0–2 | | 3–2 | 1–1 | 2–0 | 1–2 | 3–0 | 0–0 | 1–4 | 1–1 |
| IFK Sundsvall | 2–1 | 2–0 | 2–0 | 0–0 | 1–0 | 1–1 | | 1–1 | 2–1 | 2–2 | 1–3 | 3–1 | 2–0 | 0–0 |
| IK Brage | 2–0 | 1–0 | 1–0 | 0–2 | 3–1 | 1–1 | 2–0 | | 0–0 | 3–0 | 0–0 | 2–1 | 2–0 | 0–0 |
| Kalmar FF | 2–0 | 1–1 | 1–3 | 2–1 | 1–1 | 0–1 | 0–1 | 0–2 | | 1–1 | 0–4 | 5–1 | 1–1 | 0–0 |
| Landskrona BoIS | 1–1 | 1–5 | 2–4 | 0–1 | 0–3 | 1–1 | 4–0 | 3–0 | 2–0 | | 0–2 | 0–1 | 0–2 | 0–0 |
| Malmö FF | 3–0 | 0–2 | 2–1 | 0–0 | 2–2 | 1–0 | 1–0 | 0–0 | 4–0 | 4–0 | | 1–0 | 1–0 | 0–3 |
| Mjällby AIF | 2–2 | 0–1 | 0–4 | 1–3 | 0–1 | 0–1 | 0–0 | 0–1 | 0–1 | 3–2 | 1–1 | | 0–1 | 0–1 |
| Åtvidabergs FF | 0–1 | 0–0 | 3–3 | 1–1 | 0–0 | 1–0 | 2–2 | 0–2 | 0–1 | 1–1 | 1–3 | 2–1 | | 3–6 |
| Östers IF | 2–0 | 1–1 | 1–1 | 0–0 | 4–0 | 3–0 | 1–1 | 1–0 | 1–1 | 2–0 | 4–0 | 3–0 | 2–1 | |

Legend: Blue = home team win; Yellow = draw; Red = away team win.

== Attendances ==
| No. | Club | Average | Change | Highest |
|---|---|---|---|---|
| 1 | IFK Göteborg | 12,273 | -21,4% | 25,603 |
| 2 | Malmö FF | 9,336 | 14,3% | 17,000 |
| 3 | Hammarby IF | 9,030 | -20,9% | 19,069 |
| 4 | IF Elfsborg | 7,593 | -24,2% | 14,458 |
| 5 | Östers IF | 6,860 | 39,5% | 15,308 |
| 6 | IK Brage | 6,572 | - | 9,849 |
| 7 | Halmstads BK | 5,834 | -40,7% | 8,758 |
| 8 | Djurgårdens IF | 5,438 | -34,4% | 24,663 |
| 9 | IFK Sundsvall | 4,940 | -11,1% | 7,970 |
| 10 | Mjällby AIF | 4,371 | - | 8,438 |
| 11 | Landskrona BoIS | 4,327 | -5,6% | 7,930 |
| 12 | Kalmar FF | 4,250 | -14,1% | 6,909 |
| 13 | IFK Norrköping | 4,200 | -46,0% | 7,191 |
| 14 | Åtvidabergs FF | 2,977 | -13,0% | 5,894 |
