= Stig Fredriksson =

Swedish footballer

Personal information
- Date of birth: 6 March 1956 (age 70)
- Place of birth: Sorsele, Sweden
- Position: Defender

Senior career*
Years	Team	Apps	(Gls)
1975–1977	Gimonäs		
1977–1981	Västerås SK	101	(19)
1981–1987	IFK Göteborg	151	(12)

International career
1979–1987	Sweden	58	(2)
- * Club domestic league appearances and goals

Stig Fredriksson (born 6 March 1956) is a Swedish former professional footballer who played as a defender. He played for IFK Göteborg during a large part of his career, winning two UEFA Cups (1982 and 1987), as well as four Swedish Championships with the club. He also played 58 matches for the Sweden national team, captaining 15 of them.

== Honours ==
Individual

- Årets ärkeängel: 1984
