= Ruben Svensson =

Swedish footballer

Personal information
- Full name: Erik Ruben Svensson
- Date of birth: 28 November 1953 (age 72)
- Place of birth: Karlskoga, Sweden
- Position: Defender

Senior career*
Years	Team	Apps	(Gls)
1975–1977	BK Derby		
1977–1986	IFK Göteborg	174	(23)
1986–1987	Västra Frölunda IF		
1997	IFK Göteborg	0	(0)
- * Club domestic league appearances and goals

Erik Ruben Svensson (born 28 November 1953) is a Swedish former footballer who played as a right back, most notably for IFK Göteborg.

== Honours ==
Individual

- Årets ärkeängel: 1982
