= 2022 IFK Göteborg season =

IFK Göteborg
2022 season
- Chairman: Richard Berkling
- Head coach: Mikael Stahre
- Stadium: Gamla Ullevi
- Allsvenskan: 8th
- 2021–22 Svenska Cupen: Quarter-finals
- Top goalscorer: League: Marcus Berg (13); All: Marcus Berg (14)
- Highest home attendance: 18,056 vs. BK Häcken (30 October 2022, Allsvenskan)
- Lowest home attendance: 2,517 vs. Mjällby AIF (6 March 2022, Svenska Cupen); Allsvenskan: 12,068 vs. GIF Sundsvall (28 May 2022)
- Average home league attendance: 14,688
- Biggest win: 4–0 vs. Varbergs BoIS (8 August 2022, Allsvenskan)
- Biggest defeat: 0–4 vs. BK Häcken (30 October 2022, Allsvenskan)
Home colours	Away colours

The 2022 season was IFK Göteborg's 117th in existence, their 90th season in Allsvenskan and their 46th consecutive season in the league. They competed in Allsvenskan and Svenska Cupen. League play started on 3 April and ended on 6 November.

== Players ==
=== Squad ===
Note: Flags indicate national team as defined under FIFA eligibility rules; some limited exceptions apply. Players may hold more than one non-FIFA nationality.

No.	Pos.	Nation	Player
1	GK	SUR	Warner Hahn
2	DF	SWE	Emil Salomonsson
4	DF	SWE	Carl Johansson
6	MF	NOR	Eman Marković
7	MF	SWE	Sebastian Eriksson
8	MF	SYR	Hosam Aiesh
9	FW	SWE	Marcus Berg (captain)
10	FW	NGR	Suleiman Abdullahi
11	FW	EST	Erik Sorga
13	MF	SWE	Gustav Svensson
14	MF	SWE	Gustaf Norlin
15	FW	SWE	Alfons Nygaard
16	FW	SWE	Linus Carlstrand

No.	Pos.	Nation	Player
17	DF	SWE	Oscar Wendt (vice-captain)
18	DF	SWE	Felix Eriksson
19	MF	SWE	Hussein Carneil
20	DF	SWE	Johan Bångsbo
21	MF	SWE	Simon Thern
24	MF	CIV	Abundance Salaou
26	DF	NED	Tim van Assema
27	DF	IRQ	Alai Ghasem
28	MF	SWE	Lucas Kåhed
29	FW	NGR	Saidu Salisu (on loan from Kano Pillars)
30	DF	SWE	Mattias Bjärsmyr (3rd captain)
31	GK	SWE	Gustav Lillienberg
99	GK	SWE	Pontus Dahlberg

== Club ==
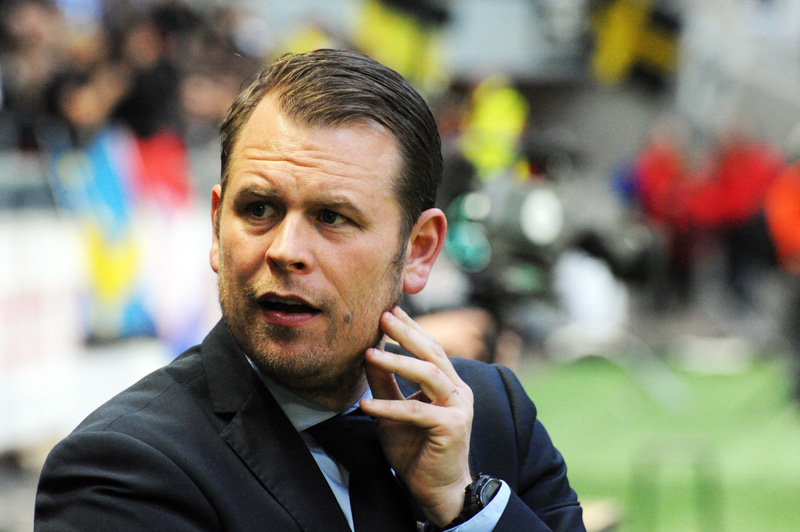
The 2022 season was Mikael Stahre's second season in his second spell at IFK Göteborg.

=== Coaching staff ===
Name	Role
(Sweden) Mikael Stahre	Head coach
(Sweden) Hannes Stiller	Assistant coach
(Sweden) Alexander Tengryd	Assistant coach
(Sweden) Stefan Remnér	Goalkeeping coach
(Sweden) Roland Kaldéus	Fitness coach
(Sweden) Kalle Olsson	Strength and conditioning coach
(Sweden) Fredrik Larsson	Physiotherapist
(Sweden) Kaj Leuther	Physiotherapist
(Sweden) Calle Persson	Physiotherapist
(Sweden) Rolf Gustavsson	Equipment manager
(Sweden) Håkan Lindahl	Equipment manager
(Norway) Stig Torbjørnsen	Head scout
(Sweden) Olle Sultan	Scout
(Sweden) Fred Jähnke	Match analyst

=== Other information ===
Chairman	(Sweden) Richard Berkling
Club director	(Sweden) Håkan Mild
Ground (capacity and dimensions)	Gamla Ullevi (18,600 / 105x68 m)

Source: IFK Göteborg and Gamla Ullevi

== Competitions ==
=== Overall ===
Competition	Started round	Final position / round	First match	Last match
Allsvenskan	Matchday 1	8th	3 April 2022	6 November 2022
2021–22 Svenska Cupen	Round 2	Quarter-finals	17 August 2021	13 March 2022

Updated to match played 6 November 2022
Source: Competitions

=== Allsvenskan ===
==== League table ====
Pos	Team	Pld	W	D	L	GF	GA	GD	Pts
6	IF Elfsborg	30	13	10	7	55	35	+20	49
7	Malmö FF	30	13	7	10	44	34	+10	46
8	IFK Göteborg	30	14	3	13	42	39	+3	45
9	Mjällby AIF	30	11	10	9	33	33	0	43
10	IFK Värnamo	30	9	10	11	34	47	−13	37

Source: svenskfotboll.se (in Swedish)
Rules for classification: 1) Points; 2) Goal difference; 3) Goals scored; 4) Head-to-head points; 5) Head-to-head goal difference; 6) Head-to-head away goals scored; 7) Play-off
(Note: Play-off is only played if need to decide champion, teams for relegation or UEFA competition and will be played on a neutral ground).

==== Results summary ====
Overall								Home						Away					
Pld	W	D	L	GF	GA	GD	Pts	W	D	L	GF	GA	GD	W	D	L	GF	GA	GD
30	14	3	13	42	39	+3	45	7	3	5	19	18	+1	7	0	8	23	21	+2

Last updated: 6 November 2022.
Source: svenskfotboll.se (in Swedish)

==== Results by round ====
Round	1	2	3	4	5	6	7	8	9	10	11	12	13	14	15	16	17	18	19	20	21	22	23	24	25	26	27	28	29	30
Ground	H	A	A	H	A	H	A	H	A	H	A	H	A	H	A	H	A	H	A	H	A	H	A	H	A	H	A	H	H	A
Result	W	W	W	D	L	L	L	D	L	W	W	W	L	D	W	W	W	L	L	W	W	L	L	L	L	W	L	W	L	W
Position	5	4	2	2	4	8	9	11	11	10	8	7	8	7	7	6	5	6	6	6	5	7	7	8	8	7	8	8	8	8

Source: see below
A = Away; H = Home; W = Win; D = Draw; L = Loss

==== Matches ====
Kickoff times are in UTC+2 unless stated otherwise.

3 April 2022 Round 1	IFK Göteborg	2–1	IFK Värnamo	Gothenburg
15:00	Thern 22'; Berg 66'	Report	Magashy 62'	Stadium: Gamla Ullevi; Attendance: 16,794; Referee: Kristoffer Karlsson

10 April 2022 Round 2	Helsingborgs IF	0–1	IFK Göteborg	Helsingborg
15:00		Report	Berg 28'	Stadium: Olympia; Attendance: 11,407; Referee: Victor Wolf

17 April 2022 Round 3	BK Häcken	0–2	IFK Göteborg	Gothenburg
17:30		Report	Vilhelmsson 3'; Aiesh 78'	Stadium: Bravida Arena; Attendance: 6,278; Referee: Glenn Nyberg

20 April 2022 Round 4	IFK Göteborg	1–1	Djurgårdens IF	Gothenburg
19:00	Norlin 24'	Report	Asoro 57'	Stadium: Gamla Ullevi; Attendance: 16,170; Referee: Fredrik Klitte

25 April 2022 Round 5	Malmö FF	1–0	IFK Göteborg	Malmö
19:10	Christiansen 48' (pen.)	Report		Stadium: Stadion; Attendance: 19,785; Referee: Andreas Ekberg

2 May 2022 Round 6	IFK Göteborg	1–2	Kalmar FF	Gothenburg
19:00	Vilhelmsson 34'	Report	Gustafsson 49'; Romário 87'	Stadium: Gamla Ullevi; Attendance: 14,147; Referee: Mohammed Al-Hakim

7 May 2022 Round 7	AIK	1–0	IFK Göteborg	Solna
15:00	Milošević 70'	Report		Stadium: Friends Arena; Attendance: 27,175; Referee: Victor Wolf

15 May 2022 Round 8	IFK Göteborg	1–1	Varbergs BoIS	Gothenburg
17:30	Aiesh 31'	Report	A. Johansson 70'	Stadium: Gamla Ullevi; Attendance: 13,306; Referee: Bojan Pandžić

22 May 2022 Round 9	IF Elfsborg	3–1	IFK Göteborg	Borås
15:00	Frick 9'; Johansson 45' (o.g.); Zandén 55'	Report	Berg 35'	Stadium: Borås Arena; Attendance: 13,126; Referee: Glenn Nyberg

28 May 2022 Round 10	IFK Göteborg	2–0	GIF Sundsvall	Gothenburg
15:00	Berg 87', 90'	Report		Stadium: Gamla Ullevi; Attendance: 12,068; Referee: Mohammed Al-Hakim

27 June 2022 Round 11	IK Sirius	1–2	IFK Göteborg	Uppsala
19:00	Kouakou 36'	Report	Norlin 41'; Yakob 61'	Stadium: Studenternas IP; Attendance: 6,194; Referee: Andreas Ekberg

4 July 2022 Round 12	IFK Göteborg	2–0	Degerfors IF	Gothenburg
19:00	Berg 38', 41'	Report		Stadium: Gamla Ullevi; Attendance: 14,109; Referee: Kaspar Sjöberg

11 July 2022 Round 13	Hammarby IF	3–0	IFK Göteborg	Stockholm
19:00	Besara 43'; Ludwigson 49'; Selmani 72' (pen.)	Report		Stadium: Tele2 Arena; Attendance: 28,837; Referee: Andreas Ekberg

17 July 2022 Round 14	IFK Göteborg	1–1	Mjällby AIF	Gothenburg
15:00	Jallow 42'	Report	Kričak 73'	Stadium: Gamla Ullevi; Attendance: 14,989; Referee: Joakim Östling

25 July 2022 Round 15	IFK Norrköping	0–2	IFK Göteborg	Norrköping
19:00		Report	Thern 40'; Yakob 90+3'	Stadium: Nya Parken; Attendance: 9,544; Referee: Kaspar Sjöberg

1 August 2022 Round 16	IFK Göteborg	2–0	IFK Norrköping	Gothenburg
19:00	Yakob 30'; Carneil 52'	Report		Stadium: Gamla Ullevi; Attendance: 15,085; Referee: Victor Wolf

8 August 2022 Round 17	Varbergs BoIS	0–4	IFK Göteborg	Varberg
19:00		Report	Berg 44', 59'; Norlin 82'; Yakob 86'	Stadium: Påskbergsvallen; Attendance: 4,450; Referee: Adam Ladebäck

15 August 2022 Round 18	IFK Göteborg	0–1	Hammarby IF	Gothenburg
19:10		Report	Trawally 77'	Stadium: Gamla Ullevi; Attendance: 17,351; Referee: Mohammed Al-Hakim

22 August 2022 Round 19	Kalmar FF	1–0	IFK Göteborg	Kalmar
19:00	Johansson 59' (o.g.)	Report		Stadium: Guldfågeln Arena; Attendance: 8,260; Referee: Glenn Nyberg

28 August 2022 Round 20	IFK Göteborg	2–0	IK Sirius	Gothenburg
15:00	Berg 45', 55'	Report		Stadium: Gamla Ullevi; Attendance: 12,587; Referee: Joakim Östling

5 September 2022 Round 21	Mjällby AIF	1–4	IFK Göteborg	Hällevik
19:00	Hahn 86' (o.g.)	Report	Norlin 12', 73'; Bångsbo 33'; Salomonsson 35'	Stadium: Strandvallen; Attendance: 3,611; Referee: Mohammed Al-Hakim

12 September 2022 Round 22	IFK Göteborg	1–3	Helsingborgs IF	Gothenburg
19:10	Norlin 39'	Report	Muhsin 37'; Wiedesheim-Paul 45+1'; Loeper 90+6'	Stadium: Gamla Ullevi; Attendance: 12,581; Referee: Andreas Ekberg

18 September 2022 Round 23	Djurgårdens IF	3–0	IFK Göteborg	Stockholm
17:30	Edvardsen 30', 37' (pen.), 69' (pen.)	Report		Stadium: Tele2 Arena; Attendance: 21,735; Referee: Joakim Östling

3 October 2022 Round 24	IFK Göteborg	1–3	IF Elfsborg	Gothenburg
19:10	Svensson 10'	Report	Baidoo 22'; Bernhardsson 35'; Söderberg 90+8'	Stadium: Gamla Ullevi; Attendance: 13,471; Referee: Kristoffer Karlsson

9 October 2022 Round 25	GIF Sundsvall	3–2	IFK Göteborg	Sundsvall
15:00	Engblom 10', 32' (pen.); Makrillos 45+3'	Report	Sorga 64'; Norlin 90+4'	Stadium: Idrottsparken; Attendance: 3,010; Referee: Victor Wolf

17 October 2022 Round 26	IFK Göteborg	2–1	Malmö FF	Gothenburg
19:10	Norlin 70'; Johansson 83'	Report	Kiese Thelin 46'	Stadium: Gamla Ullevi; Attendance: 14,011; Referee: Mohammed Al-Hakim

20 October 2022 Round 27	Degerfors IF	3–1	IFK Göteborg	Degerfors
19:00	Ohlsson 49'; Lagerbielke 66'; Bouzaiene 84'	Report	Berg 8'	Stadium: Stora Valla; Attendance: 3,389; Referee: Adam Ladebäck

24 October 2022 Round 28	IFK Göteborg	1–0	AIK	Gothenburg
19:10	Marković 81'	Report		Stadium: Gamla Ullevi; Attendance: 15,595; Referee: Victor Wolf

30 October 2022 Round 29	IFK Göteborg	0–4	BK Häcken	Gothenburg
15:00 UTC+1		Report	Turgott 6'; Hammar 16'; Rygaard 31', 82'	Stadium: Gamla Ullevi; Attendance: 18,056; Referee: Mohammed Al-Hakim

6 November 2022 Round 30	IFK Värnamo	1–4	IFK Göteborg	Värnamo
15:00 UTC+1	Zeljković 53'	Report	S. Eriksson 30'; Berg 47'; Norlin 62', 90+2' (pen.)	Stadium: Finnvedsvallen; Attendance: 3,494; Referee: Kristoffer Karlsson

=== Svenska Cupen ===
==== 2021–22 ====
The tournament continued from the 2021 season.

Kickoff times are in UTC+1.

===== Group stage =====
Pos	Team	Pld	W	D	L	GF	GA	GD	Pts	Qualification	IFKG	NIF	MAIF	LAN
1	IFK Göteborg	3	1	2	0	5	3	+2	5	Advance to Knockout stage			2–2	2–0
2	Norrby IF	3	1	2	0	4	2	+2	5		1–1			
3	Mjällby AIF	3	0	3	0	3	3	0	3			0–0		1–1
4	Landskrona BoIS	3	0	1	2	2	6	−4	1			1–3		

Source: Swedish Football Association
Rules for classification: 1) Points; 2) Goal difference; 3) Goals scored; 4) Head-to-head record; 5) Lowest disciplinary points; 6) Highest ranked team

20 February 2022 Matchday 1	IFK Göteborg	2–0	Landskrona BoIS	Gothenburg
13:00	Wendt 43'; Vilhelmsson 48'	Report		Stadium: Valhalla IP; Attendance: 2,553; Referee: Granit Maqedonci

26 February 2022 Matchday 2	Norrby IF	1–1	IFK Göteborg	Borås
13:00	Osmanagić 90+1'	Report	Salomonsson 49'	Stadium: Borås Arena; Attendance: 2,043; Referee: Victor Wolf

6 March 2022 Matchday 3	IFK Göteborg	2–2	Mjällby AIF	Gothenburg
13:00	Berg 16'; Wendt 85'	Report	Moro 20'; Gracia 45+1'	Stadium: Valhalla IP; Attendance: 2,517; Referee: Joakim Östling

===== Knockout stage =====
13 March 2022 Quarter-finals	IF Elfsborg	1–0	IFK Göteborg	Borås
13:30	Ondrejka 65'	Report		Stadium: Borås Arena; Attendance: 5,293; Referee: Glenn Nyberg

==== 2022–23 ====
The tournament continued into the 2023 season.

===== Qualification stage =====
31 August 2022 Round 2	Torns IF	0–3	IFK Göteborg	Stångby
18:00 UTC+2		Report	Marković 24', 77'; Salomonsson 47' (pen.)	Stadium: Tornvallen; Attendance: 1,843; Referee: Per Melin

== Non-competitive ==
=== Pre-season ===
Kickoff times are in UTC+1.

31 January 2022 Friendly	FC Nordsjælland (Denmark)	3–0	(Sweden) IFK Göteborg	Farum, Denmark
14:30	Walta 4'; Antman 21'; Villadsen 23'	Report		Stadium: Right to Dream Park

5 February 2022 Friendly	IFK Göteborg	0–2	Hammarby IF	Marbella, Spain
15:00		Report	Ludwigson 36' (pen.); Magyar 70'	Stadium: Marbella Football Center

10 February 2022 Friendly	IFK Göteborg (Sweden)	2–4	(Russia) Lokomotiv Moscow	Marbella, Spain
16:00	Vilhelmsson 19'; Al-Ammari 32'	Report	Kuchta 8'; Zhemaletdinov 68'; Kerk 74'; Rybus 84'	Stadium: Marbella Football Center; Referee: Espen Eskås (Norway)

22 February 2022 Friendly	IFK Göteborg	1–1	Utsiktens BK	Gothenburg, Sweden
18:00	Yakob 54'	Report	Bohm 30'	Stadium: Valhalla IP; Attendance: 380; Referee: Fredrik Oppong

18 March 2022 Friendly	IFK Göteborg	0–3	Norrby IF	Gothenburg, Sweden
18:00		Report	Lundgren 27'; Beqaj 55'; Wede 74' (pen.)	Stadium: Valhalla IP; Referee: Granit Maqedonci

26 March 2022 Friendly	IFK Göteborg (Sweden)	3–0	(Norway) Fredrikstad FK	Gothenburg, Sweden
13:00	Berg 18'; Sana 42'; Aiesh 60'	Report		Stadium: Ullevi; Referee: Kaspar Sjöberg

=== Mid-season ===
Kickoff times are in UTC+2.

11 June 2022 Friendly	Fredrikstad FK (Norway)	3–1	(Sweden) IFK Göteborg	Fredrikstad, Norway
12:30	Solberg 20' (pen.), 31', 49'	Report	Yakob 17'	Stadium: Fredrikstad Stadion; Attendance: 200; Referee: Ole-Alexander Ekeli Valen

17 June 2022 Friendly	Trelleborgs FF	0–2	IFK Göteborg	Trelleborg, Sweden
17:30		Report	Yakob 65' (pen.), 72'	Stadium: Vångavallen; Referee: Per Melin
