= 2023 IFK Göteborg season =

IFK Göteborg
2023 season
- Chairman: Richard Berkling
- Head coach: Mikael Stahre (until 8 March); William Lundin & Alexander Tengryd (caretakers, 8 March–7 June); Jens Berthel Askou (from 7 June)
- Stadium: Gamla Ullevi
- Allsvenskan: 13th
- 2022–23 Svenska Cupen: Group stage
- Top goalscorer: League: Marcus Berg (7); All: Marcus Berg (7)
- Highest home attendance: 17,875 vs. BK Häcken (27 August 2023, Allsvenskan)
- Lowest home attendance: 3,259 vs. Utsiktens BK (20 February 2023, Svenska Cupen); Allsvenskan: 13,644 vs. Degerfors IF (4 May 2023)
- Average home league attendance: 16,190
- Biggest win: 6–0 vs. Degerfors IF (4 May 2023, Allsvenskan)
- Biggest defeat: 0–4 vs. IFK Norrköping (5 March 2023, Svenska Cupen)
Home colours	Away colours

The 2023 season was IFK Göteborg's 118th in existence, their 91st season in Allsvenskan and their 47th consecutive season in the league. They competed in Allsvenskan and Svenska Cupen. League play started on 2 April and ended on 12 November.

== Players ==
=== Squad ===
Note: Flags indicate national team as defined under FIFA eligibility rules; some limited exceptions apply. Players may hold more than one non-FIFA nationality.

No.	Pos.	Nation	Player
1	GK	SWE	Pontus Dahlberg
2	DF	SWE	Emil Salomonsson
3	DF	SWE	Johan Bångsbo
5	MF	SWE	Sebastian Ohlsson
6	DF	NOR	Anders Trondsen
7	MF	SWE	Sebastian Eriksson
9	FW	SWE	Marcus Berg (captain)
10	MF	SWE	Hussein Carneil
11	MF	NOR	Eman Marković
12	GK	ISL	Adam Ingi Benediktsson
13	MF	SWE	Gustav Svensson (3rd captain)
14	MF	SWE	Gustaf Norlin

No.	Pos.	Nation	Player
15	DF	DEN	Sebastian Hausner
17	DF	SWE	Oscar Wendt (vice-captain)
19	MF	ALB	Arbnor Muçolli
20	FW	NGR	Suleiman Abdullahi
21	MF	SWE	Adam Carlén
22	FW	KOS	Astrit Selmani (on loan from Hapoel Be'er Sheva)
23	MF	ISL	Kolbeinn Þórðarson
24	MF	CIV	Abundance Salaou
26	MF	SWE	David Pérez (on loan from Atalanta)
28	MF	SWE	Lucas Kåhed
29	DF	DEN	Thomas Santos

== Club ==
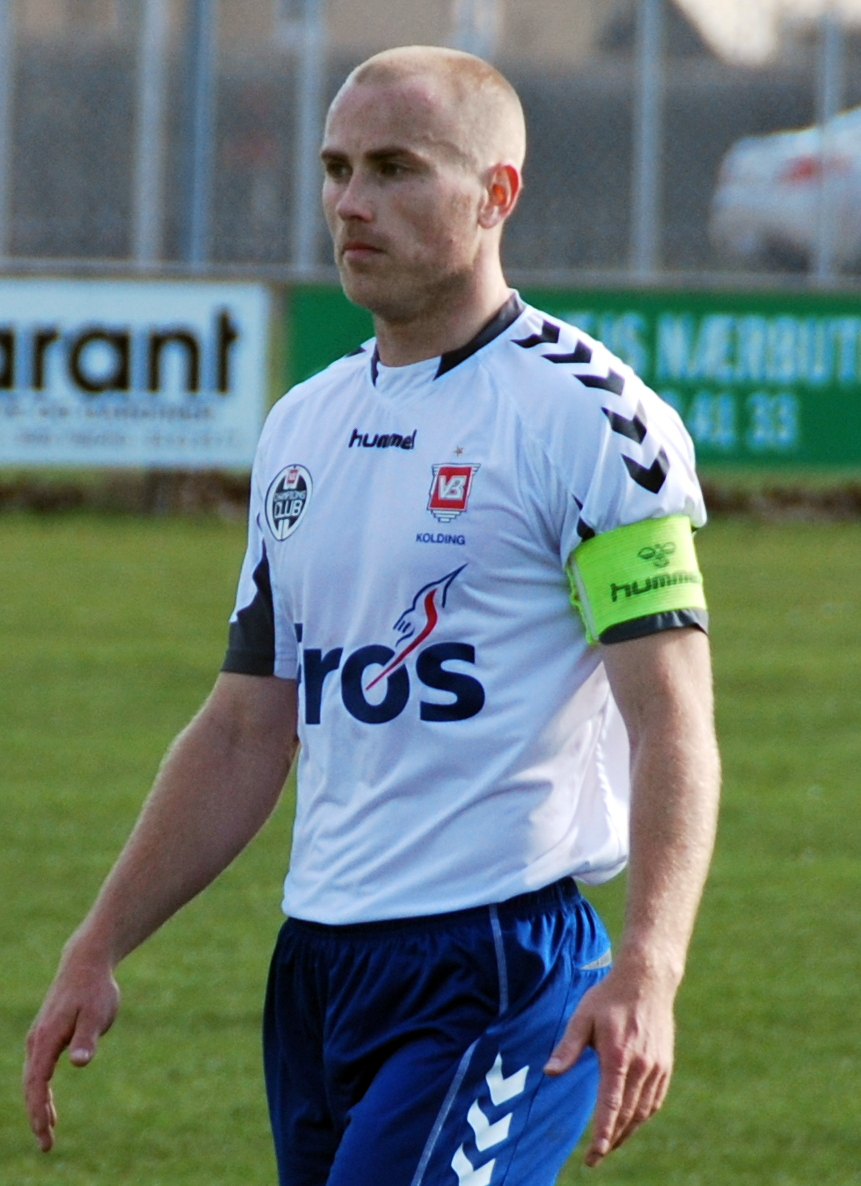
The 2023 season was Jens Berthel Askou's first season at IFK Göteborg.

=== Coaching staff ===
Name	Role
(Denmark) Jens Berthel Askou	Head coach
(Sweden) William Lundin	Assistant coach
(Scotland) Lee Baxter	Goalkeeping coach
(Sweden) Kalle Olsson	Strength and conditioning coach
(Sweden) Fredrik Larsson	Physiotherapist
(Sweden) Kaj Leuther	Physiotherapist
(Sweden) Calle Persson	Physiotherapist
(Sweden) Fred Jähnke	Match analyst
(Norway) Stig Torbjørnsen	Head scout
(Sweden) Olle Sultan	Scout
(Sweden) David Vuković	Sports assistant
(Sweden) Rolf Gustavsson	Equipment manager
(Sweden) Håkan Lindahl	Equipment manager

=== Other information ===
Chairman	(Sweden) Richard Berkling
Club director	(Sweden) Håkan Mild
Technical director	(Sweden) Ola Larsson
Team manager	(Sweden) Hannes Stiller
Ground (capacity and dimensions)	Gamla Ullevi (18,600 / 105x68 m)

Source: IFK Göteborg and Gamla Ullevi

== Competitions ==
=== Overall ===
Competition	Started round	Final position / round	First match	Last match
Allsvenskan	Matchday 1	13th	2 April 2023	12 November 2023
2022–23 Svenska Cupen	Round 2	Group stage	31 August 2022	5 March 2023

Updated to match played 12 November 2023
Source: Competitions

=== Allsvenskan ===
==== League table ====
Pos	Team	Pld	W	D	L	GF	GA	GD	Pts	Qualification or relegation
11	AIK	30	9	9	12	34	38	−4	36	
12	Halmstads BK	30	9	9	12	30	44	−14	36	
13	IFK Göteborg	30	8	10	12	33	37	−4	34	
14	IF Brommapojkarna (O)	30	10	3	17	40	53	−13	33	Qualification for the Allsvenskan play-off
15	Degerfors IF (R)	30	7	5	18	30	62	−32	26	Relegation to Superettan

Source: svenskfotboll.se (in Swedish)
Rules for classification: 1) Points; 2) Goal difference; 3) Goals scored; 4) Head-to-head points; 5) Head-to-head goal difference; 6) Play-off
(Note: Play-off is only played if need to decide champion, teams for relegation or UEFA competition and will be played on a neutral ground).
(O) Play-off winners; (R) Relegated

==== Results summary ====
Overall								Home						Away					
Pld	W	D	L	GF	GA	GD	Pts	W	D	L	GF	GA	GD	W	D	L	GF	GA	GD
30	8	10	12	33	37	−4	34	5	4	6	20	14	+6	3	6	6	13	23	−10

Last updated: 12 November 2023.
Source: svenskfotboll.se (in Swedish)

==== Results by round ====
Round	1	2	3	4	5	6	7	8	9	10	11	12	13	14	15	16	17	18	19	20	21	22	23	24	25	26	27	28	29	30
Ground	H	A	H	A	H	H	A	A	H	A	H	A	A	H	A	H	H	A	H	A	H	A	H	A	A	H	A	H	H	A
Result	L	L	L	L	D	W	D	D	D	L	L	L	D	L	D	D	W	L	W	W	W	D	W	W	D	L	L	L	D	W
Position	12	15	15	16	16	15	13	12	13	14	14	14	15	15	15	15	15	15	15	14	12	12	11	10	10	12	13	13	13	13

Source: see below
A = Away; H = Home; W = Win; D = Draw; L = Loss

==== Matches ====
Kickoff times are in UTC+2 unless stated otherwise.

2 April 2023 Round 1	IFK Göteborg	0–1	IFK Värnamo	Gothenburg
17:30		Report	Berg 90+2' (o.g.)	Stadium: Gamla Ullevi; Attendance: 16,180; Referee: Adam Ladebäck

9 April 2023 Round 2	Kalmar FF	2–0	IFK Göteborg	Kalmar
17:30	Skrabb 31'; Hümmet 90+4'	Report		Stadium: Guldfågeln Arena; Attendance: 8,902; Referee: Granit Maqedonci

17 April 2023 Round 3	IFK Göteborg	0–1	Malmö FF	Gothenburg
19:10		Report	Kiese Thelin 20'	Stadium: Gamla Ullevi; Attendance: 17,051; Referee: Fredrik Klitte

23 April 2023 Round 4	Djurgårdens IF	1–0	IFK Göteborg	Stockholm
15:00	Finndell 6'	Report		Stadium: Tele2 Arena; Attendance: 22,529; Referee: Mohammed Al-Hakim

1 May 2023 Round 5	IFK Göteborg	1–1	IFK Norrköping	Gothenburg
15:00	Ohlsson 8'	Report	Salomonsson 28' (o.g.)	Stadium: Gamla Ullevi; Attendance: 14,983; Referee: Victor Wolf

4 May 2023 Round 6	IFK Göteborg	6–0	Degerfors IF	Gothenburg
19:00	Svensson 6'; Ohlsson 21'; Berg 42', 52'; Hagen 62'; Wendt 84'	Report		Stadium: Gamla Ullevi; Attendance: 13,644; Referee: Mohammed Al-Hakim

8 May 2023 Round 7	IF Brommapojkarna	0–0	IFK Göteborg	Stockholm
19:00		Report		Stadium: Grimsta IP; Attendance: 2,556; Referee: Andreas Ekberg

15 May 2023 Round 8	AIK	2–2	IFK Göteborg	Solna
19:10	Svensson 13' (o.g.); Modesto 54'	Report	Ohlsson 5', 72'	Stadium: Friends Arena; Attendance: 21,113; Referee: Victor Wolf

21 May 2023 Round 9	IFK Göteborg	1–1	Hammarby IF	Gothenburg
17:30	Berg 87' (pen.)	Report	Sadiku 44'	Stadium: Gamla Ullevi; Attendance: 17,289; Referee: Fredrik Klitte

29 May 2023 Round 10	BK Häcken	4–1	IFK Göteborg	Gothenburg
19:10	Larsen 16'; Rygaard 48'; Traoré 55'; Dahbo 87'	Report	Norlin 34'	Stadium: Bravida Arena; Attendance: 6,141; Referee: Granit Maqedonci

3 June 2023 Round 11	IFK Göteborg	0–1	Mjällby AIF	Gothenburg
15:00		Report	Ståhl 58'	Stadium: Gamla Ullevi; Attendance: 14,616; Referee: Richard Sundell

11 June 2023 Round 12	IK Sirius	2–0	IFK Göteborg	Uppsala
15:00	Matthews 6'; Persson 68'	Report		Stadium: Studenternas IP; Attendance: 6,876; Referee: Oscar Johnson

2 July 2023 Round 13	Halmstads BK	0–0	IFK Göteborg	Halmstad
15:00		Report		Stadium: Örjans Vall; Attendance: 9,804; Referee: Joakim Östling

10 July 2023 Round 14	IFK Göteborg	1–2	Varbergs BoIS	Gothenburg
19:00	Norlin 90+4' (pen.)	Report	Krasniqi 55', 90'	Stadium: Gamla Ullevi; Attendance: 15,687; Referee: Mohammed Al-Hakim

16 July 2023 Round 15	IF Elfsborg	1–1	IFK Göteborg	Borås
15:00	Frick 46'	Report	Lagerbielke 29' (o.g.)	Stadium: Borås Arena; Attendance: 14,379; Referee: Glenn Nyberg

23 July 2023 Round 16	IFK Göteborg	0–0	Halmstads BK	Gothenburg
17:30		Report		Stadium: Gamla Ullevi; Attendance: 16,110; Referee: Andreas Ekberg

30 July 2023 Round 17	IFK Göteborg	2–0	Kalmar FF	Gothenburg
17:30	Carlén 40', 62'	Report		Stadium: Gamla Ullevi; Attendance: 15,055; Referee: Joakim Östling

7 August 2023 Round 18	IFK Norrköping	3–0	IFK Göteborg	Norrköping
19:00	Traustason 31', 44'; Shabani 73'	Report		Stadium: Nya Parken; Attendance: 9,390; Referee: Mohammed Al-Hakim

13 August 2023 Round 19	IFK Göteborg	2–1	Djurgårdens IF	Gothenburg
15:00	Muçolli 77'; Berg 86'	Report	Milleskog 20'	Stadium: Gamla Ullevi; Attendance: 16,729; Referee: Andreas Ekberg

19 August 2023 Round 20	Degerfors IF	1–2	IFK Göteborg	Degerfors
15:00	Granath 50'	Report	Salomonsson 65'; Berg 86'	Stadium: Stora Valla; Attendance: 5,880; Referee: Adam Ladebäck

27 August 2023 Round 21	IFK Göteborg	4–2	BK Häcken	Gothenburg
17:30	Berg 21', 52'; Hausner 35'; Muçolli 41'	Report	Romeo 59'; Youssef 75'	Stadium: Gamla Ullevi; Attendance: 17,875; Referee: Glenn Nyberg

3 September 2023 Round 22	Malmö FF	2–2	IFK Göteborg	Malmö
17:30	Kiese Thelin 49' (pen.); Olsson 90+7'	Report	Muçolli 13', 36'	Stadium: Stadion; Attendance: 20,907; Referee: Fredrik Klitte

16 September 2023 Round 23	IFK Göteborg	1–0	IF Brommapojkarna	Gothenburg
15:00	Muçolli 62' (pen.)	Report		Stadium: Gamla Ullevi; Attendance: 16,191; Referee: Kristoffer Karlsson

24 September 2023 Round 24	Mjällby AIF	0–1	IFK Göteborg	Hällevik
15:00		Report	Santos 84'	Stadium: Strandvallen; Attendance: 5,186; Referee: Adam Ladebäck

1 October 2023 Round 25	Hammarby IF	1–1	IFK Göteborg	Stockholm
17:30	Erabi 53'	Report	Muçolli 90+2' (pen.)	Stadium: Tele2 Arena; Attendance: 25,784; Referee: Fredrik Klitte

7 October 2023 Round 26	IFK Göteborg	0–1	IK Sirius	Gothenburg
17:30		Report	Stensson 54'	Stadium: Gamla Ullevi; Attendance: 17,099; Referee: Victor Wolf

23 October 2023 Round 27	IFK Värnamo	3–1	IFK Göteborg	Värnamo
19:00	Engvall 52'; Johansson 63'; Ademi 77'	Report	Salomonsson 19'	Stadium: Finnvedsvallen; Attendance: 3,269; Referee: Kristoffer Karlsson

30 October 2023 Round 28	IFK Göteborg	1–2	IF Elfsborg	Gothenburg
19:10 UTC+1	Holmén 76' (o.g.)	Report	Frick 32'; Bernhardsson 83'	Stadium: Gamla Ullevi; Attendance: 17,228; Referee: Fredrik Klitte

6 November 2023 Round 29	IFK Göteborg	1–1	AIK	Gothenburg
19:10 UTC+1	Papagiannopoulos 30' (o.g.)	Report	Ayari 67'	Stadium: Gamla Ullevi; Attendance: 17,116; Referee: Kristoffer Karlsson

12 November 2023 Round 30	Varbergs BoIS	1–2	IFK Göteborg	Varberg
15:00 UTC+1	Zackrisson 64'	Report	Kåhed 74'; Carlén 90+5'	Stadium: Påskbergsvallen; Attendance: 3,713; Referee: Granit Maqedonci

=== Svenska Cupen ===
==== 2022–23 ====
The tournament continued from the 2022 season.

Kickoff times are in UTC+1.

===== Group stage =====
Pos	Team	Pld	W	D	L	GF	GA	GD	Pts	Qualification	IFKN	GAIS	IFKG	UBK
1	IFK Norrköping	3	2	1	0	8	3	+5	7	Advance to Knockout stage				3–3
2	GAIS	3	2	0	1	4	2	+2	6		0–1		2–1	
3	IFK Göteborg	3	1	0	2	4	8	−4	3		0–4			3–2
4	Utsiktens BK	3	0	1	2	5	8	−3	1			0–2		

Source: SvFF
Rules for classification: 1) Points; 2) Goal difference; 3) Goals scored; 4) Head-to-head record; 5) Lowest disciplinary points; 6) Highest ranked team

20 February 2023 Matchday 1	IFK Göteborg	3–2	Utsiktens BK	Gothenburg
18:30	Marković 12'; Carneil 39'; Hagen 42'	Report	Skoglund 35'; Martinsson 82'	Stadium: Bravida Arena; Attendance: 3,259; Referee: Bojan Pandžić

26 February 2023 Matchday 2	GAIS	2–1	IFK Göteborg	Gothenburg
13:00	Norén 56'; Çelik 62' (pen.)	Report	Carlén 42'	Stadium: Bravida Arena; Attendance: 5,375; Referee: Bojan Pandžić

5 March 2023 Matchday 3	IFK Göteborg	0–4	IFK Norrköping	Gothenburg
15:15		Report	Sigurðsson 37', 64' (pen.); Traustason 45+1'; Shabani 75'	Stadium: Bravida Arena; Attendance: 4,379; Referee: Granit Maqedonci

==== 2023–24 ====
The tournament continued into the 2024 season.

===== Qualification stage =====
23 August 2023 Round 2	IK Zenith	0–2	IFK Göteborg	Gothenburg
19:00 UTC+2		Report	Tyrén 17'; Selmani 70'	Stadium: Hovgårdsvallen; Attendance: 4,041; Referee: Philip Lindh

== Non-competitive ==
=== Pre-season ===
Kickoff times are in UTC+1.

20 January 2023 Friendly	IFK Göteborg	4–1	Degerfors IF	Gothenburg, Sweden
18:00	Ohlsson 2'; Carlstrand 61', 66'; Salomonsson 65'	Report	Hedén Lindskog 90+2'	Stadium: Valhalla IP; Attendance: 2,254; Referee: Bojan Pandžić

28 January 2023 Friendly	IFK Göteborg	1–1	Halmstads BK	Gothenburg, Sweden
12:00	Salomonsson 43'	Report	Vik. Granath 34'	Stadium: Valhalla IP; Attendance: 2,056; Referee: Joakim Östling

6 February 2023 Friendly	Tromsø IL (Norway)	0–2	(Sweden) IFK Göteborg	Alicante, Spain
15:05		Report	Hagen 8'; Abdullahi 28'	Stadium: Albir Garden Pitch; Attendance: 75

11 February 2023 Friendly	Viborg FF (Denmark)	3–0	(Sweden) IFK Göteborg	San Pedro del Pinatar, Spain
15:00	Leemans 10'; Bonde 25'; Paulinho 81'	Report		Stadium: Pinatar Arena; Attendance: 250

10 March 2023 Friendly	IFK Göteborg (Sweden)	1–1	(Finland) IFK Mariehamn	Gothenburg, Sweden
20:00	Carneil 10'	Report	Dé 83'	Stadium: Valhalla IP; Attendance: 355; Referee: Andreas Dufva-Johansson

18 March 2023 Friendly	IFK Göteborg	1–0	Jönköpings Södra IF	Gothenburg, Sweden
14:00	Hagen 69'	Report		Stadium: Valhalla IP; Referee: Fredrik Oppong

25 March 2023 Friendly	IFK Göteborg (Sweden)	1–1	(Norway) Sarpsborg 08	Gothenburg, Sweden
12:30	Norlin 29'	Report	Salomonsson 25' (o.g.)	Stadium: Valhalla IP; Referee: Granit Maqedonci

=== Mid-season ===
25 June 2023 Friendly	Malmö FF	0–1	IFK Göteborg	Malmö, Sweden
16:00 UTC+2		Report	Norlin 26'	Stadium: Stadion; Attendance: 4,930; Referee: Oscar Johnson
