= 2021 IFK Göteborg season =

IFK Göteborg
2021 season
- Chairman: Richard Berkling
- Head coach: Roland Nilsson (until 2 June); Mikael Stahre (from 2 June)
- Stadium: Gamla Ullevi
- Allsvenskan: 8th
- 2020–21 Svenska Cupen: Group stage
- Top goalscorer: League: Marcus Berg (10); All: Marcus Berg (10)
- Highest home attendance: 16,781 vs. Malmö FF (7 November 2021, Allsvenskan)
- Lowest home attendance: 0 vs. GIF Sundsvall (28 February 2021, Svenska Cupen) (Note: Due to the COVID-19 pandemic, the maximum attendance was initially 8 people. This was increased to 500 from 1 June and to approximately 3,000 per section from 1 July. From 29 September, full capacity was allowed.); Allsvenskan: 8 (4 matches); 6,384 vs. Kalmar FF (27 September 2021) (Note: Excluding games before 1 July.)
- Average home league attendance: 7,444; 10,148
- Biggest win: 4–0 vs. Östersunds FK (28 November 2021, Allsvenskan)
- Biggest defeat: 0–3 vs. Hammarby IF (23 September 2021, Allsvenskan)
| Home colours | Away colours |

The 2021 season was IFK Göteborg's 116th in existence, their 89th season in Allsvenskan and their 45th consecutive season in the league. They competed in Allsvenskan and Svenska Cupen. League play started on 11 April and ended on 4 December.

== Players ==
=== Squad ===
Note: Flags indicate national team as defined under FIFA eligibility rules; some limited exceptions apply. Players may hold more than one non-FIFA nationality.

| No. | Pos. | Nation | Player |
|---|---|---|---|
| 1 | GK | (Greece) GRE | Giannis Anestis |
| 3 | DF | (Brazil) BRA | Bernardo Vilar |
| 4 | DF | (Sweden) SWE | Carl Johansson |
| 5 | DF | (Sweden) SWE | Alexander Jallow |
| 7 | MF | (Sweden) SWE | Sebastian Eriksson |
| 8 | MF | (Sweden) SWE | Hosam Aiesh |
| 9 | FW | (Sweden) SWE | Robin Söder (vice-captain) |
| 10 | FW | (Sweden) SWE | Patrik Karlsson Lagemyr |
| 11 | FW | (Iceland) ISL | Kolbeinn Sigþórsson |
| 12 | GK | (Sweden) SWE | Ole Söderberg |
| 13 | MF | (Sweden) SWE | Gustav Svensson |
| 14 | MF | (Sweden) SWE | Gustaf Norlin |
| 17 | DF | (Sweden) SWE | Oscar Wendt |

| No. | Pos. | Nation | Player |
|---|---|---|---|
| 18 | MF | (Sweden) SWE | Isak Dahlqvist |
| 19 | MF | (Sweden) SWE | August Erlingmark |
| 20 | MF | (Sweden) SWE | Simon Thern |
| 22 | MF | (Sweden) SWE | Tobias Sana (3rd captain) |
| 23 | MF | (Sweden) SWE | Kevin Yakob |
| 24 | MF | (Croatia) CRO | Filip Ambrož |
| 25 | GK | (Iceland) ISL | Adam Ingi Benediktsson |
| 29 | FW | (Sweden) SWE | Oscar Vilhelmsson |
| 30 | DF | (Sweden) SWE | Mattias Bjärsmyr |
| 33 | FW | (Sweden) SWE | Marcus Berg (captain) |
| 34 | FW | (Sweden) SWE | Alfons Nygaard |
| 35 | FW | (Sweden) SWE | Lucas Kåhed |

== Club ==
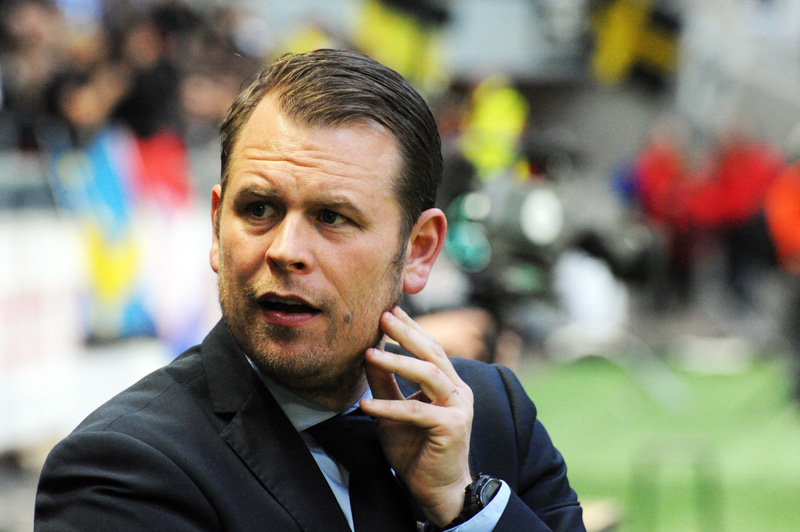
The 2021 season was Mikael Stahre's first season in his second spell at IFK Göteborg.

=== Coaching staff ===
| Name | Role |
|---|---|
| (Sweden) Mikael Stahre | Head coach |
| (Sweden) Patrik Persson | Assistant coach |
| (Sweden) Hannes Stiller | Assistant coach |
| (Sweden) William Strömberg | Assistant coach |
| (Sweden) Stefan Remnér | Goalkeeping coach |
| (Sweden) Roland Kaldéus | Fitness coach |
| (Sweden) Kalle Olsson | Strength and conditioning coach |
| (Sweden) Fredrik Larsson | Physiotherapist |
| (Sweden) Calle Persson | Physiotherapist |
| (Iceland) Jón Karlsson | Club doctor |
| (Sweden) Rolf Gustavsson | Equipment manager |
| (Sweden) Håkan Lindahl | Equipment manager |
| (Iceland) Hjálmar Jónsson | U19 head coach |

=== Other information ===
| Chairman | (Sweden) Richard Berkling |
| Club director | (Sweden) Håkan Mild |
| Director of sports | (Sweden) Pontus Farnerud |
| Ground (capacity and dimensions) | Gamla Ullevi (18,600 / 105x68 m) |

Source: IFK Göteborg and Gamla Ullevi

== Competitions ==
=== Overall ===
| Competition | Started round | Final position / round | First match | Last match |
|---|---|---|---|---|
| Allsvenskan | Matchday 1 | 8th | 10 April 2021 | 4 December 2021 |
| 2020–21 Svenska Cupen | Round 2 | Group stage | 30 September 2020 | 7 March 2021 |

Updated to match played 4 December 2021
Source: Competitions

=== Allsvenskan ===
==== League table ====
| Pos | Team | Pld | W | D | L | GF | GA | GD | Pts |
|---|---|---|---|---|---|---|---|---|---|
| 6 | Kalmar FF | 30 | 13 | 8 | 9 | 41 | 39 | +2 | 47 |
| 7 | IFK Norrköping | 30 | 13 | 5 | 12 | 45 | 41 | +4 | 44 |
| 8 | IFK Göteborg | 30 | 11 | 8 | 11 | 42 | 39 | +3 | 41 |
| 9 | Mjällby AIF | 30 | 9 | 11 | 10 | 34 | 27 | +7 | 38 |
| 10 | Varbergs BoIS | 30 | 9 | 10 | 11 | 35 | 38 | −3 | 37 |

Source: svenskfotboll.se (in Swedish)
Rules for classification: 1) Points; 2) Goal difference; 3) Goals scored; 4) Head-to-head points; 5) Head-to-head goal difference; 6) Head-to-head away goals scored; 7) Play-off
(Note: Play-off is only played if need to decide champion, teams for relegation or UEFA competition and will be played on a neutral ground).

==== Results summary ====
| Overall | | | | | | | | Home | | | | | | Away | | | | | |
| Pld | W | D | L | GF | GA | GD | Pts | W | D | L | GF | GA | GD | W | D | L | GF | GA | GD |
|---|---|---|---|---|---|---|---|---|---|---|---|---|---|---|---|---|---|---|---|
| 30 | 11 | 8 | 11 | 42 | 39 | +3 | 41 | 6 | 3 | 6 | 23 | 17 | +6 | 5 | 5 | 5 | 19 | 22 | −3 |

Last updated: 4 December 2021.
Source: svenskfotboll.se (in Swedish)

==== Results by round ====
| Round | 1 | 2 | 3 | 4 | 5 | 6 | 7 | 8 | 9 | 10 | 11 | 12 | 13 | 14 | 15 | 16 | 17 | 18 | 19 | 20 | 21 | 22 | 23 | 24 | 25 | 26 | 27 | 28 | 29 | 30 |
|---|---|---|---|---|---|---|---|---|---|---|---|---|---|---|---|---|---|---|---|---|---|---|---|---|---|---|---|---|---|---|
| Ground | A | H | H | A | H | A | H | A | H | A | H | A | H | H | A | H | A | H | A | A | H | A | H | A | H | A | H | A | H | A |
| Result | D | W | L | D | D | D | D | D | L | W | W | L | L | D | W | L | L | W | L | L | L | L | W | W | W | W | L | D | W | W |
| Position | 7 | 4 | 8 | 9 | 10 | 10 | 11 | 10 | 12 | 9 | 7 | 8 | 9 | 9 | 9 | 11 | 12 | 11 | 11 | 11 | 12 | 13 | 12 | 11 | 9 | 8 | 10 | 9 | 8 | 8 |

Source: see below
A = Away; H = Home; W = Win; D = Draw; L = Loss

==== Matches ====
Kickoff times are in UTC+2 unless stated otherwise.

| 10 April 2021 Round 1 | Örebro SK | 0–0 | IFK Göteborg | Örebro |
| 17:30 | | Report | | Stadium: Eyravallen; Attendance: 8 Referee: Kaspar Sjöberg |

| 19 April 2021 Round 2 | IFK Göteborg | 2–0 | AIK | Gothenburg |
| 19:00 | Sigþórsson 3', 38' | Report | | Stadium: Ullevi; Attendance: 8 Referee: Andreas Ekberg |

| 26 April 2021 Round 3 | IFK Göteborg | 2–3 | Degerfors IF | Gothenburg |
| 18:30 | Aiesh 52'; Yakob 74' | Report | Ayaz 27'; Bertilsson 38', 49' | Stadium: Ullevi; Attendance: 8 Referee: Victor Wolf |

| 2 May 2021 Round 4 | Halmstads BK | 1–1 | IFK Göteborg | Halmstad |
| 15:00 | Antonsson 10' | Report | Sana 51' | Stadium: Örjans Vall; Attendance: 8 Referee: Glenn Nyberg |

| 8 May 2021 Round 5 | IFK Göteborg | 1–1 | BK Häcken | Gothenburg |
| 15:00 | Sana 90+6' (pen.) | Report | Ekpolo 56' | Stadium: Ullevi; Attendance: 8 Referee: Andreas Ekberg |

| 12 May 2021 Round 6 | Kalmar FF | 0–0 | IFK Göteborg | Kalmar |
| 18:30 | | Report | | Stadium: Guldfågeln Arena; Attendance: 8 Referee: Kristoffer Karlsson |

| 17 May 2021 Round 7 | IFK Göteborg | 2–2 | IK Sirius | Gothenburg |
| 18:30 | Yakob 24'; Hamšík 52' | Report | Kouakou 38', 65' | Stadium: Ullevi; Attendance: 8 Referee: Mohammed Al-Hakim |

| 23 May 2021 Round 8 | Djurgårdens IF | 0–0 | IFK Göteborg | Stockholm |
| 17:30 | | Report | | Stadium: Tele2 Arena; Attendance: 8 Referee: Glenn Nyberg |

| 5 July 2021 Round 9 | IFK Göteborg | 0–1 | IF Elfsborg | Gothenburg |
| 19:00 | | Report | Larsson 75' | Stadium: Ullevi; Attendance: 8,773; Referee: Kaspar Sjöberg |

| 11 July 2021 Round 10 | Östersunds FK | 2–3 | IFK Göteborg | Östersund |
| 17:30 | Jno-Baptiste 57'; Kroon 88' | Report | Sigþórsson 12'; Eriksson 45'; Söder 78' | Stadium: Jämtkraft Arena; Attendance: 1,380; Referee: Glenn Nyberg |

| 18 July 2021 Round 11 | IFK Göteborg | 3–2 | Mjällby AIF | Gothenburg |
| 17:30 | Sigþórsson 39'; Berg 51'; Jallow 83' | Report | Sarr 20', 60' | Stadium: Ullevi; Attendance: 9,031; Referee: Victor Wolf |

| 26 July 2021 Round 12 | Varbergs BoIS | 2–0 | IFK Göteborg | Varberg |
| 19:00 | Alfonsi 5'; Moon 78' (pen.) | Report | | Stadium: Påskbergsvallen; Attendance: 608; Referee: Andreas Ekberg |

| 2 August 2021 Round 13 | IFK Göteborg | 1–2 | IFK Norrköping | Gothenburg |
| 19:00 | Berg 56' | Report | Agardius 20'; Björk 34' | Stadium: Ullevi; Attendance: 9,742; Referee: Mohammed Al-Hakim |

| 8 August 2021 Round 14 | IFK Göteborg | 0–0 | Hammarby IF | Gothenburg |
| 17:30 | | Report | | Stadium: Ullevi; Attendance: 9,337; Referee: Victor Wolf |

| 14 August 2021 Round 15 | Malmö FF | 2–3 | IFK Göteborg | Malmö |
| 15:00 | Čolak 7'; Abubakari 86' | Report | Berg 17'; Larsson 55' (o.g.); Sana 90+9' (pen.) | Stadium: Stadion; Attendance: 5,652; Referee: Glenn Nyberg |

| 23 August 2021 Round 16 | IFK Göteborg | 1–2 | Varbergs BoIS | Gothenburg |
| 19:00 | Söder 90+2' | Report | Tranberg 6'; Moon 49' | Stadium: Ullevi; Attendance: 8,062; Referee: Kaspar Sjöberg |

| 29 August 2021 Round 17 | BK Häcken | 3–2 | IFK Göteborg | Gothenburg |
| 15:00 | Bengtsson 25'; Jeremejeff 40' (pen.); Wålemark 48' | Report | Sana 3' (pen.); Berg 62' | Stadium: Bravida Arena; Attendance: 1,820; Referee: Adam Ladebäck |

| 12 September 2021 Round 18 | IFK Göteborg | 2–0 | Halmstads BK | Gothenburg |
| 17:30 | Sana 45'; Berg 63' | Report | | Stadium: Ullevi; Attendance: 7,101; Referee: Fredrik Klitte |

| 20 September 2021 Round 19 | AIK | 3–1 | IFK Göteborg | Solna |
| 19:00 | Bahoui 5', 13'; Otieno 33' | Report | Thern 25' | Stadium: Friends Arena; Attendance: 14,077; Referee: Adam Ladebäck |

| 23 September 2021 Round 20 | Hammarby IF | 3–0 | IFK Göteborg | Stockholm |
| 19:00 | Amoo 6'; Ouattara 45+3'; Rodić 70' | Report | | Stadium: Tele2 Arena; Attendance: 9,655; Referee: Kaspar Sjöberg |

| 27 September 2021 Round 21 | IFK Göteborg | 0–2 | Kalmar FF | Gothenburg |
| 19:00 | | Report | Romário 17'; J. Ring 60' | Stadium: Ullevi; Attendance: 6,384; Referee: Kristoffer Karlsson |

| 1 October 2021 Round 22 | IF Elfsborg | 1–0 | IFK Göteborg | Borås |
| 19:00 | Okkels 39' | Report | | Stadium: Borås Arena; Attendance: 11,285; Referee: Andreas Ekberg |

| 17 October 2021 Round 23 | IFK Göteborg | 2–0 | Örebro SK | Gothenburg |
| 17:30 | Wendt 43', 90+4' | Report | | Stadium: Gamla Ullevi; Attendance: 13,345; Referee: Victor Wolf |

| 24 October 2021 Round 24 | Mjällby AIF | 1–3 | IFK Göteborg | Hällevik |
| 15:00 | Sarr 49' | Report | Johansson 28', 75'; Berg 83' | Stadium: Strandvallen; Attendance: 4,216; Referee: Mohammed Al-Hakim |

| 28 October 2021 Round 25 | IFK Göteborg | 3–0 | Djurgårdens IF | Gothenburg |
| 19:00 | Erlingmark 20'; Berg 50'; Sana 52' | Report | | Stadium: Gamla Ullevi; Attendance: 12,251; Referee: Kaspar Sjöberg |

| 1 November 2021 Round 26 | Degerfors IF | 0–1 | IFK Göteborg | Degerfors |
| 19:00 UTC+1 | | Report | Vilhelmsson 39' | Stadium: Stora Valla; Attendance: 4,086; Referee: Adam Ladebäck |

| 7 November 2021 Round 27 | IFK Göteborg | 0–2 | Malmö FF | Gothenburg |
| 17:30 UTC+1 | | Report | Rieks 27', 70' | Stadium: Gamla Ullevi; Attendance: 16,781; Referee: Kristoffer Karlsson |

| 21 November 2021 Round 28 | IK Sirius | 3–3 | IFK Göteborg | Uppsala |
| 17:30 UTC+1 | Sylisufaj 33'; Hellborg 45', 85' | Report | Aiesh 20'; Vilhelmsson 38'; Bjärsmyr 90+1' | Stadium: Studenternas IP; Attendance: 4,197; Referee: Glenn Nyberg |

| 28 November 2021 Round 29 | IFK Göteborg | 4–0 | Östersunds FK | Gothenburg |
| 15:00 UTC+1 | Berg 3', 56'; Sana 24'; Ouattara 73' (o.g.) | Report | | Stadium: Gamla Ullevi; Attendance: 10,824; Referee: Granit Maqedonci |

| 4 December 2021 Round 30 | IFK Norrköping | 1–2 | IFK Göteborg | Norrköping |
| 15:00 UTC+1 | Nyman 36' | Report | Berg 14'; Bernardo 59' | Stadium: Nya Parken; Attendance: 3,221; Referee: Kristoffer Karlsson |

=== Svenska Cupen ===
==== 2020–21 ====
The tournament continued from the 2020 season.

Kickoff times are in UTC+1.

===== Group stage =====
| Pos | Team | Pld | W | D | L | GF | GA | GD | Pts | Qualification | IFKN | IFKG | SIF | GIF |
|---|---|---|---|---|---|---|---|---|---|---|---|---|---|---|
| 1 | IFK Norrköping | 3 | 2 | 1 | 0 | 7 | 2 | +5 | 7 | Advance to Knockout stage | | 1–1 | | 2–0 |
| 2 | IFK Göteborg | 3 | 1 | 2 | 0 | 6 | 5 | +1 | 5 | | | | | 1–1 |
| 3 | Sandvikens IF | 3 | 1 | 0 | 2 | 7 | 10 | −3 | 3 | | 1–4 | 3–4 | | |
| 4 | GIF Sundsvall | 3 | 0 | 1 | 2 | 3 | 6 | −3 | 1 | | | | 2–3 | |

Source: Swedish Football Association
Rules for classification: 1) Points; 2) Goal difference; 3) Goals scored; 4) Head-to-head record; 5) Highest ranked team

| 20 February 2021 Matchday 1 | Sandvikens IF | 3–4 | IFK Göteborg | Sandviken |
| 13:00 | Mohammed 27', 49'; Bonnah 46' | Report | Wernbloom 37'; Jallow 67'; Söder 73'; C. Johansson 76' | Stadium: Jernvallen; Attendance: 8 Referee: Glenn Nyberg |

| 28 February 2021 Matchday 2 | IFK Göteborg | 1–1 | GIF Sundsvall | Gothenburg |
| 13:00 | Sana 90+3' (pen.) | Report | Hallenius 63' | Stadium: Valhalla IP; Attendance: 0 Referee: Mohammed Al-Hakim |

| 7 March 2021 Matchday 3 | IFK Norrköping | 1–1 | IFK Göteborg | Norrköping |
| 17:00 | Hakšabanović 45' | Report | Söder 26' | Stadium: Nya Parken; Attendance: 0 Referee: Adam Ladebäck |

==== 2021–22 ====
The tournament continued into the 2022 season.

===== Qualification stage =====
| 17 August 2021 Round 2 | Österlen FF | 0–3 | IFK Göteborg | Skillinge |
| 18:30 UTC+2 | | Report | Norlin 6'; Söder 15'; Aiesh 50' | Stadium: Skillinge IP; Attendance: 1,300; Referee: Adi Aganović |

== Non-competitive ==
=== Pre-season ===
Kickoff times are in UTC+1 unless stated otherwise.

| 5 February 2021 Friendly | IFK Göteborg | 1–1 | Halmstads BK | Gothenburg |
| 15:00 | Nygaard 62' | Report | Tot Wikström 7' | Stadium: Valhalla IP; Attendance: 0 Referee: Granit Maqedonci |

| 9 February 2021 Friendly | IFK Göteborg | 2–2 | Degerfors IF | Gothenburg |
| 16:00 | Norlin 85'; Wikström 89' | Report | Edvardsen 49', 59' | Stadium: Valhalla IP; Attendance: 0 Referee: Joakim Östling |

| 13 February 2021 Friendly | Helsingborgs IF | 0–0 | IFK Göteborg | Helsingborg |
| 14:00 | | Report | | Stadium: Olympiafältet; Attendance: 0 Referee: Andreas Ekberg |

| 13 March 2021 Friendly | IFK Göteborg | 1–0 | IK Sirius | Linköping |
| 16:00 | Sana 67' | Report | | Stadium: Linköping Arena; Attendance: 0 Referee: Andreas Dufva-Johansson |

| 19 March 2021 Friendly | IFK Göteborg | 4–0 | Landskrona BoIS | Gothenburg |
| 18:00 | Yusuf 13'; Thern 42'; Yakob 62', 90+2' | Report | | Stadium: Valhalla IP; Attendance: 0 Referee: Joakim Östling |

| 26 March 2021 Friendly | Malmö FF | 2–1 | IFK Göteborg | Malmö |
| 14:00 | Čolak 48' (pen.); Nanasi 53' | Report | Sana 13' | Stadium: Stadion; Attendance: 0 Referee: Kaspar Sjöberg |

| 2 April 2021 Friendly | IFK Göteborg | 3–3 | IFK Värnamo | Gothenburg |
| 14:00 UTC+2 | Yakob 33', 61'; Yusuf 81' | Report | Johansson 20', 51'; Magashy 36' | Stadium: Valhalla IP; Attendance: 0 Referee: Fredrik Oppong |

=== Mid-season ===
| 23 June 2021 Friendly | IFK Göteborg (Sweden) | 1–2 | (Denmark) Brøndby IF | Gothenburg, Sweden |
| 13:00 UTC+2 | Sigþórsson 9' | Report | Singh 72'; Uhre 83' | Stadium: Ullevi; Attendance: 500; Referee: Fredrik Klitte |
