= List of IFK Göteborg managers =

The following is a list of managers of IFK Göteborg, with their league match record and major honours. Including the current manager Stefan Billborn, IFK Göteborg have had 39 managers or caretaker-managers during 47 managerial spells, excluding the first 16 years of the club's history when there was no official manager. The longest-serving manager is Henning Svensson, who made three spells at the club for a total of 8½ seasons.

Erik Hjelm, Holger Hansson, Hans Karlsson, Gunder Bengtsson, Kjell Pettersson, Roger Gustafsson and Mikael Stahre have all made two spells as manager or caretaker-manager at IFK Göteborg, while Jonas Olsson has had two successive spells as manager, one in cooperation with Stefan Rehn and one as the single manager in charge.

The most successful IFK Göteborg manager in terms of trophies won is Roger Gustafsson who won five Swedish Championships and one Svenska Cupen title during his six-year spell at the club. The only two managers to have won a European title with a Swedish club have done so with IFK Göteborg, Sven-Göran Eriksson won one UEFA Cup title and two Svenska Cupen titles during his spell as manager and Gunder Bengtsson won one UEFA Cup title and two Swedish Championships during his two spells.

The period listed for each spell includes only years where the manager was active during the league season. It does not include years where the manager departed before the start or was appointed after the conclusion of the season. The record only includes matches in Svenska Serien, Allsvenskan, Mästerskapsserien and Division 2.

== Managers ==
Name	Nat	Years		Record							Honours
Name	Nat	From	To	Pld	W	D	L	GF	GA	GD	Honours
No manager		1904	1920	71	50	12	17	239	114	+125	3 Swedish Championships
Sándor 'Alexander' Bródy	(Hungary)	1921	1923	27	12	7	8	51	32	+19	
Henning Svensson	(Sweden)	1924	1929	127	76	28	23	342	177	+165	
Erik Hjelm	(Sweden)	1930	1930	20	13	1	6	55	35	+20	
Henning Svensson	(Sweden)	1931	1932	46	24	10	12	111	70	+41	
Erik Hjelm	(Sweden)	1933	1938	117	55	22	40	221	177	+44	1 Swedish Championship
Dave Morris	(England)	1938	1940	53	32	8	13	117	65	+52	
Ernst Andersson	(Sweden)	1941	1942	43	21	13	9	94	62	+32	1 Swedish Championship
Henning Svensson	(Sweden)	1943	1943	10	4	4	2	22	17	+5	
József Nagy	(Hungary)	1943	1948	110	54	22	34	266	195	+71	
Gunnar Rydberg	(Sweden)	1948	1949	22	9	5	8	36	33	+3	
John Mahon	(England)	1949	1953	84	36	14	34	158	166	−8	
Axel Ohlsson	(Sweden)	1953	1954	22	7	8	7	22	26	−4	
Walter Probst	(Austria)	1954	1958	99	47	15	37	193	160	+33	1 Swedish Championship
Josef 'Pepi' Stroh	(Austria)	1959	1960	33	18	6	9	76	51	+25	
Gunnar Gren	(Sweden)	1960	1960	11	3	3	5	26	26	0	
Holger Hansson	(Sweden)	1961	1962	44	21	8	15	108	79	+29	
Yngve Brodd	(Sweden)	1963	1966	88	40	18	30	158	146	+12	
Bertil 'Bebben' Johansson	(Sweden)	1967	1970	88	32	23	33	137	133	+4	1 Swedish Championship
Hans Karlsson	(Sweden)	1971	1973	70	39	11	20	123	84	+39	
Holger Hansson	(Sweden)	1974	1974	26	10	8	8	50	42	+8	
Nils Berghamn	(Sweden)	1975	1976	52	40	7	5	140	46	+94	
Hans Karlsson	(Sweden)	1977	1978	52	22	14	16	87	78	+9	
Sven-Göran Eriksson	(Sweden)	1979	1982	87	44	27	16	161	83	+78	1 UEFA Cup, 2 Svenska Cupen
Gunder Bengtsson	(Sweden)	1982	1982	13	7	5	1	33	13	+20	1 Swedish Championship
Björn Westerberg	(Sweden)	1983	1984	44	25	9	10	78	38	+40	2 Swedish Championships, 1 Svenska Cupen
Gunder Bengtsson	(Sweden)	1985	1987	66	31	21	14	122	66	+56	1 UEFA Cup, 1 Swedish Championship
Kjell Pettersson	(Sweden)	1988	1989	44	22	9	13	71	47	+24	
Roger Gustafsson	(Sweden)	1990	1995	156	86	34	36	269	152	+117	5 Swedish Championships, 1 Svenska Cupen
Mats Jingblad	(Sweden)	1996	1998	60	33	15	12	118	68	+50	1 Swedish Championship
Reine Almqvist	(Sweden)	1998	1999	30	9	10	11	31	34	−3	
Stefan Lundin	(Sweden)	1999	2002	83	39	18	26	119	103	+16	
Roger Gustafsson	(Sweden)	2002	2002	9	2	2	5	9	15	−6	
Bo Johansson	(Sweden)	2003	2004	52	24	12	16	70	48	+22	
Arne Erlandsen	(Norway)	2005	2006	42	21	13	8	62	37	+25	
Kjell Pettersson	(Sweden)	2006	2006	10	2	3	5	15	21	−6	
Jonas Olsson & Stefan Rehn	(Sweden)	2007	2010	100	49	28	23	164	85	+79	1 Swedish Championship, 1 Svenska Cupen
Jonas Olsson	(Sweden)	2010	2011	46	20	10	16	68	51	+17	
Mikael Stahre	(Sweden)	2012	2014	90	40	29	21	143	106	+37	1 Svenska Cupen
Jörgen Lennartsson	(Sweden)	2015	2017	74	36	23	15	127	86	+41	1 Svenska Cupen
Alf Westerberg	(Sweden)	2017	2017	17	6	4	10	28	27	+1	
Poya Asbaghi	(Sweden)	2018	2020	78	24	24	30	105	112	−7	1 Svenska Cupen
Ferran Sibila	(Spain)	2020	2020	1	0	0	1	0	4	−4	
Roland Nilsson	(Sweden)	2020	2021	19	6	8	5	22	16	+6	
Mikael Stahre	(Sweden)	2021	2023	52	24	5	23	76	71	+5	
William Lundin & Alexander Tengryd	(Sweden)	2023	2023	11	1	4	6	11	14	−3	
Jens Berthel Askou	(Denmark)	2023	2024	31	11	8	12	35	42	−7	
Stefan Billborn	(Sweden)	2024	2026	62	22	15	25	78	90	−12	
Joachim Björklund	(Sweden)	2026		0	0	0	0	0	0	0	
