= Carl Johansson (footballer, born 1994) =

Swedish footballer (born 1994)

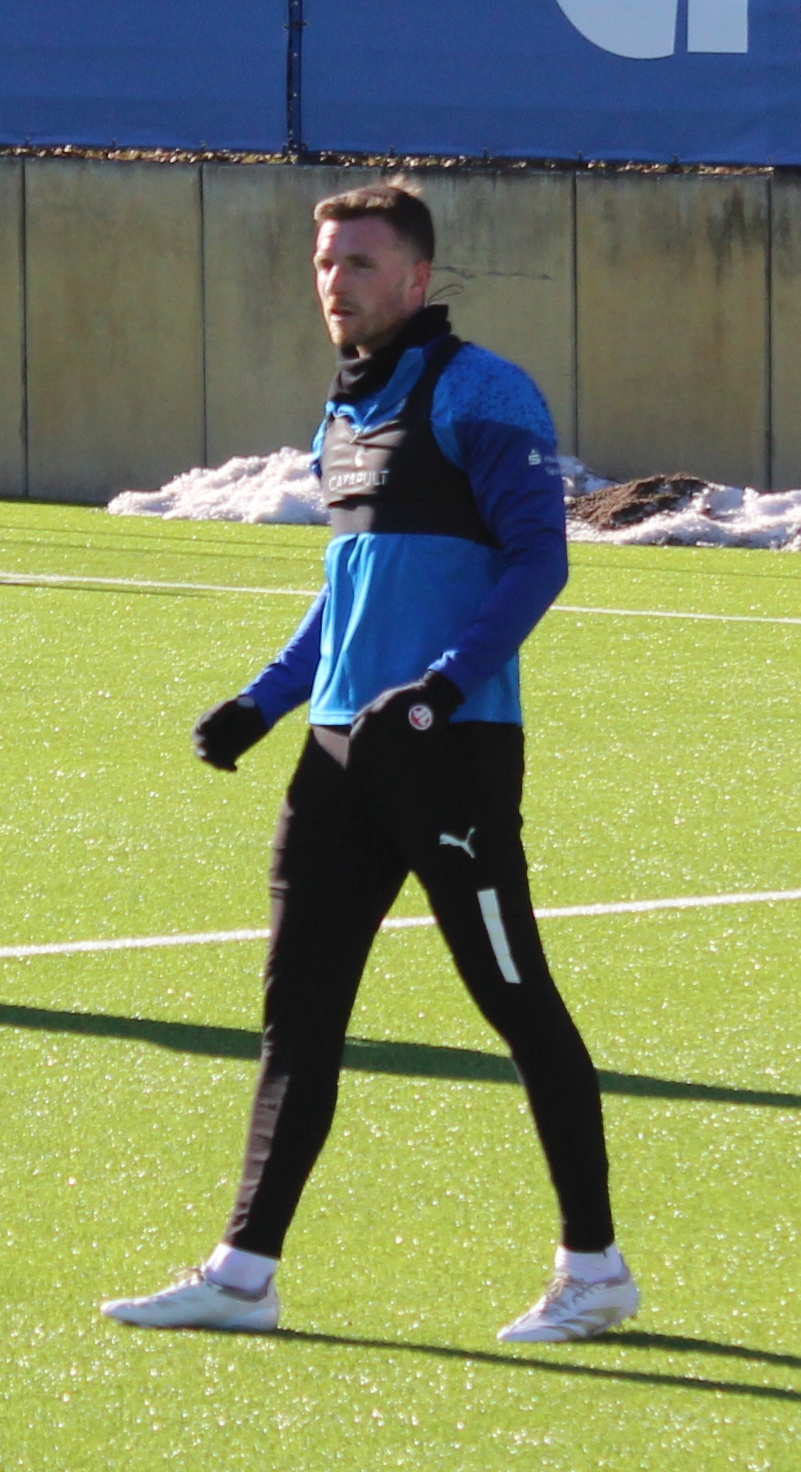

Personal information
- Full name: Carl Anders Lorentz Johansson
- Date of birth: 23 May 1994 (age 32)
- Place of birth: Lund, Sweden
- Height: 1.88 m (6 ft 2 in)
- Position: Centre-back

Youth career
- 1999–2009: Höörs IS
- 2009–2012: Helsingborgs IF

Senior career*
Years	Team	Apps	(Gls)
2013	HIF Akademi	10	(0)
2013–2018	Helsingborgs IF	72	(6)
2019–2020	Falkenbergs FF	53	(4)
2021–2023	IFK Göteborg	45	(3)
2023	→ Randers FC (loan)	13	(1)
2023–2026	Holstein Kiel	33	(1)
2024	Holstein Kiel II	2	(0)

International career
2013–2014	Sweden U19	3	(0)
2014–2015	Sweden U21	3	(1)
- * Club domestic league appearances and goals as of 17 May 2026

Carl Anders Lorentz Johansson (born 23 May 1994) is a Swedish professional footballer who plays as a centre-back.

== Career ==
Johansson made his Allsvenskan debut for Helsingborgs IF on 15 September 2013 against BK Häcken. He was born in Lund but grew up in Höör.

== Career statistics ==
As of match played 17 May 2025

Appearances and goals by club, season and competition
Club	Season	League			Cup		Total	
Club	Season	Division	Apps	Goals	Apps	Goals	Apps	Goals
Helsingborgs IF	2013	Allsvenskan	3	0	—		3	0
Helsingborgs IF	2014	Allsvenskan	12	0	5	0	17	0
Helsingborgs IF	2015	Allsvenskan	16	1	5	0	21	1
Helsingborgs IF	2016	Allsvenskan	6	2	4	0	10	2
Helsingborgs IF	2017	Allsvenskan	19	0	1	0	20	0
Helsingborgs IF	2018	Allsvenskan	16	3	4	0	20	3
Helsingborgs IF	Total		72	6	19	0	91	6
HIF Akademi (loan)	2013	Swedish football division 2	10	0	—		10	0
Falkenbergs FF	2019	Allsvenskan	24	1	1	0	25	1
Falkenbergs FF	2020	Allsvenskan	29	3	3	0	32	3
Falkenbergs FF	Total		53	4	4	0	57	4
IFK Göteborg	2021	Allsvenskan	18	2	4	1	22	3
IFK Göteborg	2022	Allsvenskan	27	1	4	0	31	1
IFK Göteborg	Total		45	3	8	1	53	4
Randers FC (loan)	2022–23	Danish Superliga	13	1	—		13	1
Holstein Kiel	2023–24	2. Bundesliga	12	0	1	0	13	0
Holstein Kiel	2024–25	Bundesliga	10	0	0	0	10	0
Holstein Kiel	Total		22	0	1	0	23	0
Holstein Kiel II	2023–24	Regionalliga Nord	1	0	—		1	0
Holstein Kiel II	2024–25	Regionalliga Nord	1	0	—		1	0
Holstein Kiel II	Total		2	0	—		2	0
Career total			216	14	32	1	248	15
