= Warner Hahn =

Dutch footballer (born 1992)

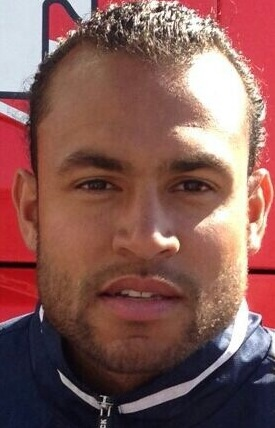

Personal information
- Full name: Warner Lloyd Hahn
- Date of birth: 15 June 1992 (age 34)
- Place of birth: Rotterdam, Netherlands
- Height: 1.90 m (6 ft 3 in)
- Position: Goalkeeper

Team information
- Current team: Hammarby IF
- Number: 1

Youth career
- 1998–2001: vv Alexandria '66
- 2001–2008: Sparta Rotterdam
- 2008–2012: Ajax

Senior career*
Years	Team	Apps	(Gls)
2012–2014	FC Dordrecht	57	(0)
2014–2017	Feyenoord	0	(0)
2014–2015	→ PEC Zwolle (loan)	30	(0)
2017	→ Excelsior (loan)	17	(0)
2017–2020	Heerenveen	63	(0)
2021	Anderlecht	0	(0)
2021–2022	Go Ahead Eagles	19	(0)
2022	IFK Göteborg	26	(0)
2023–2024	Kyoto Sanga	0	(0)
2024–	Hammarby IF	71	(0)

International career^{‡}
2007–2008	Netherlands U16	3	(0)
2008–2009	Netherlands U17	11	(0)
2011	Netherlands U19	5	(0)
2013–2014	Netherlands U21	14	(0)
2021–	Suriname	26	(0)
Medal record
Representing Netherlands
UEFA European Under-17 Championship
Runner-up	Germany 2009	U17 Team
- * Club domestic league appearances and goals as of 7 November 2026 ‡ National team caps and goals as of 23:02, 29 June 2025 (UTC)

Warner Lloyd Hahn (Dutch pronunciation: [ˈʋɑrnər ˈɦaːn]; born 15 June 1992) is a professional footballer who plays as a goalkeeper for Hammarby IF. Born in the Netherlands, he plays for the Suriname national team.

He formerly played for FC Dordrecht, Feyenoord, PEC Zwolle, Excelsior, Anderlecht, Go Ahead Eagles, IFK Göteborg and Kyoto Sanga.

== Club career ==
Hahn joined Go Ahead Eagles in the Netherlands for 2021–22 season and made his debut in a 1–0 loss against Heerenveen on 13 August 2021. On 28 August, Hahn kept his first clean sheet for the club in a 2–0 win against Sparta Rotterdam. On 29 January 2022, Hahn and Go Ahead Eagles mutually agreed to terminate his contract.

On 9 February 2022, he joined Allsvenskan club IFK Göteborg on a one-year contract. At the end of the season, the team announced they would not be renewing Hahn's contract.

On 7 January 2023, Hahn signed for J1 League club Kyoto Sanga for the 2023 season. He made his debut in March 2023, in a 1–3 J.League Cup defeat to Gamba Osaka. In his second appearance for the club, he conceded five goals in a 5–0 defeat to FC Tokyo and did not make another appearance during the 2023 season.

== International career ==
Born in the Netherlands, Hahn is of Surinamese descent. In March 2021, he has been called up to the national squad of Suriname by coach Dean Gorré after receiving the green light from FIFA to call-up Dutch origin players including several that currently play in the Netherlands. He made his debut on 24 March 2021 in a World Cup qualifier against the Cayman Islands. In June 2021, Hahn was named to Suriname's 23-man squad for the 2021 CONCACAF Gold Cup.

== Career statistics ==
=== Club ===
As of match played 16 August 2026

Appearances and goals by club, season and competition
Club	Season	League			National cup (Note: Includes KNVB Cup, Svenska Cupen, Emperor's Cup)		League cup (Note: Includes J.League Cup)		Continental		Other		Total	
Club	Season	Division	Apps	Goals	Apps	Goals	Apps	Goals	Apps	Goals	Apps	Goals	Apps	Goals
FC Dordrecht	2012–13	Eerste Divisie	23	0	2	0	—		—		2 (Note: Appearance(s) in Eredivisie promotion/relegation play-offs)	0	27	0
FC Dordrecht	2013–14	Eerste Divisie	34	0	1	0	—		—		4	0	39	0
FC Dordrecht	Total		57	0	3	0	—		—		6	0	66	0
Feyenoord	2014–15	Eredivisie	0	0	0	0	—		—		—		0	0
Feyenoord	2015–16	Eredivisie	0	0	0	0	—		—		—		0	0
Feyenoord	2016–17	Eredivisie	0	0	0	0	—		—		—		0	0
Feyenoord	Total		0	0	0	0	—		—		—		0	0
PEC Zwolle (loan)	2014–15	Eredivisie	32	0	6	0	—		—		—		38	0
Excelsior (loan)	2016–17	Eredivisie	17	0	—		—		—		—		17	0
Heerenveen	2017–18	Eredivisie	9	0	—		—		—		—		9	0
Heerenveen	2018–19	Eredivisie	34	0	4	0	—		—		—		38	0
Heerenveen	2019–20	Eredivisie	20	0	3	0	—		—		—		23	0
Heerenveen	Total		63	0	7	0	—		—		—		70	0
Anderlecht	2020–21	Belgian Pro League	0	0	0	0	—		—		—		0	0
Go Ahead Eagles	2021–22	Eredivisie	19	0	0	0	—		—		—		0	0
IFK Göteborg	2022	Allsvenskan	26	0	4	0	—		—		—		30	0
Kyoto Sanga	2023	J1 League	0	0	0	0	2	0	—		—		2	0
Kyoto Sanga	2024	J1 League	0	0	1	0	1	0	—		—		2	0
Kyoto Sanga	Total		0	0	1	0	3	0	—		—		4	0
Hammarby IF	2024	Allsvenskan	15	0	0	0	—		—		—		15	0
Hammarby IF	2025	Allsvenskan	29	0	4	0	—		4 (Note: Appearance(s) in UEFA Conference League)	0	—		37	0
Hammarby IF	2026	Allsvenskan	17	0	6	0	—		4 (Note: Two appearances in UEFA Champions League, two appearances in UEFA Conference League)	0	—		27	0
Hammarby IF	Total		61	0	10	0	—		8	0	—		79	0
Career Total			275	0	31	0	3	0	8	0	6	0	324	0

=== International ===
As of match played 24 July 2024

National team	Year	Apps	Goals
Suriname	2021	7	0
Suriname	2022	7	0
Suriname	2023	5	0
Suriname	2024	3	0
Suriname	2025	4	0
Total		26	0

== Honours ==
Individual

- Allsvenskan Goalkeeper of the Year: 2024
