= Eman Marković =

Norwegian footballer (born 1999)

Personal information
- Full name: Eman Marković
- Date of birth: 8 May 1999 (age 27)
- Place of birth: Flekkefjord, Norway
- Height: 1.80 m (5 ft 11 in)
- Position: Winger

Team information
- Current team: GKS Katowice
- Number: 15

Youth career
- –2014: Lyngdal IL
- 2015–2016: Molde FK

Senior career*
Years	Team	Apps	(Gls)
2014	Lyngdal IL	12	(6)
2015–2017	Molde FK 2	48	(14)
2017–2018	Molde FK	0	(0)
2018–2019	Zrinjski Mostar	13	(1)
2019	IK Start 2	7	(4)
2019–2021	IK Start	66	(17)
2022	IFK Norrköping	15	(1)
2022–2025	IFK Göteborg	39	(1)
2024	→ Sandefjord (loan)	30	(6)
2025–	GKS Katowice	29	(9)

International career
2014	Norway U15	4	(0)
2015	Norway U16	11	(0)
2016	Norway U17	5	(0)
2017	Norway U18	13	(5)
2018	Norway U19	7	(3)
2019	Norway U20	5	(1)
2018	Norway U21	1	(0)
- * Club domestic league appearances and goals as of 22:23, 24 August 2026 (UTC)

Eman Marković (born 8 May 1999) is a Norwegian professional footballer who plays as a winger for Polish Ekstraklasa club GKS Katowice. A former Norway youth international, he represented the country from under-15 to under-21 level and took part in the 2018 UEFA European Under-19 Championship and the 2019 FIFA U-20 World Cup.

== Club career ==
=== Lyngdal and Molde ===
Marković began playing football with Lyngdal IL, where he remained until the age of 15. In 2014, he made 12 league appearances and scored six goals for the club's senior side. He subsequently joined the youth system of Molde FK in 2015.

Marković later played for Molde 2, making 48 league appearances and scoring 14 goals between 2015 and 2017. Although he was registered as a member of Molde's senior squad, he did not make a league appearance for the first team.

=== Zrinjski Mostar ===
In June 2018, Marković left Molde and signed his first professional contract with Bosnian club HŠK Zrinjski Mostar. The agreement was valid until 31 May 2020.

He made his Bosnian Premier League debut on 5 August 2018, appearing in a 2–0 away defeat against Željezničar. On 30 November, he scored the only goal of a 1–0 home victory over Krupa, his first league goal for Zrinjski.

Marković left Zrinjski by mutual consent on 8 July 2019. He made 15 appearances in all competitions and scored one goal during his season with the club.

=== Start ===
On 7 August 2019, Marković returned to Norway and signed a four-and-a-half-year contract with Start. His involvement during the remainder of the 2019 season was limited by minor injuries and illness, and he made eight league appearances, six of them as a substitute. He also featured in three promotion play-off matches as Start secured a place in the Eliteserien.

Marković played 28 league matches and scored once during the 2020 Eliteserien season. His most productive campaign for Start came in the 2021 Norwegian First Division, when he recorded 16 goals and eight assists in 30 league appearances. In December 2021, he was voted Start's player of the year in a supporters' poll, receiving more than 60 per cent of the votes.

Across all competitions, Marković made 72 appearances and scored 20 goals for Start.

=== IFK Norrköping and IFK Göteborg ===
On 25 February 2022, Marković joined Swedish Allsvenskan club IFK Norrköping on a four-year contract. He made 15 league appearances and scored one goal during his half-season with the club.

On 9 August 2022, he transferred to fellow Allsvenskan club IFK Göteborg, signing a contract until the end of the 2025 season. He made 13 league appearances and scored once during the remainder of the 2022 campaign, followed by 12 appearances without a goal in 2023.

After periods outside the first-team squad, Marković returned to Norway in February 2024, joining Sandefjord Fotball on loan for the entire season. The agreement included an option to make the transfer permanent. He made 30 Eliteserien appearances for Sandefjord, scoring six goals and providing five assists.

Marković returned to Göteborg before the 2025 season. On 9 March, he scored a hat-trick in a 4–0 Svenska Cupen quarter-final victory over Hammarby. Despite his cup performances, he again lost his regular place in the team during the summer. Marković later described his time outside Göteborg's first-team group and the subsequent loan to Sandefjord as a difficult period in his career.

He left IFK Göteborg in August 2025, having made 58 appearances and scored nine goals for the club in all competitions.

=== GKS Katowice ===
On 29 August 2025, Marković joined Polish Ekstraklasa club GKS Katowice on a permanent transfer. He signed a three-year contract running until June 2028.

Marković established himself as an attacking option for GKS during the 2025–26 season. In the spring of 2026, he recorded six goals and one assist over four consecutive league matches. He finished his first Ekstraklasa campaign with eight goals in 25 league appearances.

== International career ==
Marković was born in Flekkefjord, Norway, and grew up in Lyngdal. Both of his parents were born in Bosnia and Herzegovina, making him eligible to represent either Norway or Bosnia and Herzegovina at international level. He holds both Norwegian and Bosnia and Herzegovina citizenship. Marković has publicly identified with his Bosnian family background.

He represented Norway at every youth level from under-15 to under-21, recording 46 appearances and nine goals across the country's youth teams.

Marković was included in Norway's squad for the 2018 UEFA European Under-19 Championship in Finland. Norway finished third in their group and faced England in a play-off for a place at the following year's FIFA U-20 World Cup. Marković came on as a substitute and scored Norway's second goal in a 3–0 victory, which secured the country's first qualification for the tournament since 1993.

He was subsequently selected for Norway's squad for the 2019 FIFA U-20 World Cup in Poland. On 30 May 2019, Marković came on as a substitute and scored in Norway's 12–0 group-stage victory over Honduras, the largest winning margin in the tournament's history at the time.

== Career statistics ==
As of match played 12 August 2026

Appearances and goals by club, season and competition
Club	Season	League			National cup (Note: Includes Bosnian Cup, Norwegian Cup, Svenska Cupen, Polish Cup)		Europe		Other		Total	
Club	Season	Division	Apps	Goals	Apps	Goals	Apps	Goals	Apps	Goals	Apps	Goals
Zrinjski Mostar	2018–19	Bosnian Premier League	13	1	1	0	0	0	—		14	1
Start	2019	1. divisjon	8	0	0	0	—		3 (Note: Appearances in promotion play-offs.)	0	11	0
Start	2020	Eliteserien	28	1	—		—		—		28	1
Start	2021	1. divisjon	30	16	3	3	—		—		33	19
Start	Total		66	17	3	3	—		3	0	72	20
IFK Norrköping	2022	Allsvenskan	15	1	0	0	—		—		15	1
IFK Göteborg	2022	Allsvenskan	13	1	0	0	—		—		13	1
IFK Göteborg	2023	Allsvenskan	12	0	0	0	—		—		12	0
IFK Göteborg	2025	Allsvenskan	14	0	5	3	—		—		19	3
IFK Göteborg	Total		39	1	5	3	—		0	0	44	4
Sandefjord (loan)	2024	Eliteserien	30	6	1	0	—		—		31	6
GKS Katowice	2025–26	Ekstraklasa	25	8	4	1	—		—		29	9
GKS Katowice	2026–27	Ekstraklasa	2	0	0	0	4 (Note: Appearances in UEFA Conference League)	0	—		6	0
GKS Katowice	Total		27	8	4	1	4	0	—		35	9
Career total			190	34	14	7	4	0	3	0	211	41
