= Kevin Yakob =

Iraqi footballer (born 2000)

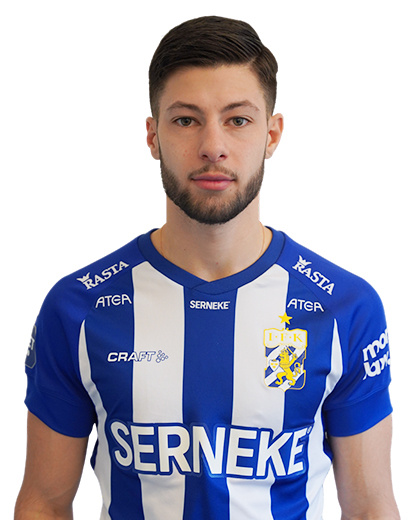
- Yakob in 2021

Personal information
- Full name: Kevin Enkido Yakob William
- Date of birth: 10 October 2000 (age 26)
- Place of birth: Gothenburg, Sweden
- Height: 1.84 m (6 ft 0 in)
- Position: Midfielder

Team information
- Current team: AGF
- Number: 17

Youth career
- –2010: Assyriska BK
- 2010–2012: IFK Göteborg
- 2012–2015: Angered MBIK
- 2016–2018: BK Häcken

Senior career*
Years	Team	Apps	(Gls)
2018–2020	BK Häcken	3	(1)
2020	→ Utsiktens BK (loan)	9	(3)
2021–2022	IFK Göteborg	38	(6)
2022–	AGF	50	(7)

International career^{‡}
2018	Sweden U19	9	(1)
2023–	Iraq	6	(0)
- * Club domestic league appearances and goals as of 16:45, 11 May 2026 (UTC) ‡ National team caps and goals as of 1 April 2026

Kevin Enkido Yakob William (Syriac: ܟܒܢ ܝܥܩܘܒ, born 10 October 2000) is a professional footballer who plays as a midfielder for Danish Superliga club AGF. Born in Sweden, he plays for the Iraq national team.

== Early life ==
Yakob was born in Gothenburg, Sweden to Assyrian parents from Basrah, Iraq.

== Club career ==
=== Youth career ===
Yakob spent his early years playing for local side Assyriska BK, a club formed by Assyrian immigrants like his parents, staying there until 2010. At the age of 9 he joined Allsvenskan club IFK Göteborg's academy, staying there for two years. In 2012, Yakob left Göteborg and joined Angered MBIK, where he would spend the next three years.

In 2015, Yakob travelled to England to trial with Sunderland, where he was given a tour of the club's academy and facilities and met with first team players, including Jermain Defoe. He trained with the club's academy teams and watched a Premier League match at the Stadium of Light. A move to north England never materialised however.

In 2016, at the age of 15, Yakob joined BK Häcken's academy.

=== BK Häcken ===
During the 2018 pre-season, Yakob was included in BK Häcken's first team squad in the preparations, playing 4 friendly matches.

In May 2018, Yakob signed his first professional contract with BK Häcken, signing a four-year contract, keeping him at the club until 2022.

Yakob made his debut for the Häcken first team on 27 October 2018, two weeks after his 18th birthday, coming on in the 83rd minute against Dalkurd FF, scoring less than a minute after coming on. The game ended as a 5–0 win for Häcken.

=== IFK Göteborg ===
In January 2021, he was signed by IFK Göteborg on a two-year professional contract.

=== AGF Aarhus ===
In August 2022, Yakob joined Danish Superliga club AGF Aarhus on a 5-year contract, scoring one goal and making three assists against Vatanspor on his debut in the Danish Cup. On 10 May 2026, he won the Danish Superliga with AGF, the club's first league title in 40 years. In the deciding match against Brøndby, he scored to secure a 2–0 win.

== International career ==
=== Youth ===
Yakob was first called up to the national team in May 2018, as part of the Under-19 squad that would be competing in a friendly tournament on the island of Gotland. He came on against Hungary to make his debut for the Sweden U19s and scored his first international goal on his second appearance against Turkey.

Yakob was called up for the Under-19 European Championship qualifiers in October 2018, starting all three matches against Scotland, Wales and San Marino, facing Premier League players like Chelsea's Billy Gilmour, Liverpool's Neco Williams and Manchester United's Dylan Levitt.

=== Senior ===
In September 2022, Yakob was in the process of getting an Iraqi passport, as he had attracted interest from the Iraq Football Association (IFA) to play for the Iraqi national team. On 18 January 2023, FIFA agreed to transfer Yakob's paperwork to the IFA and therefore making him eligible for selection for the Iraq national football team. He was called up in March 2023 to face Russia but his club refused to let him go due to the fact that the game was in Russia, amidst the invasion of Ukraine. He was called up again in June 2023 to face Colombia. He made his debut against Colombia but after 23 minutes he went off injured, which later turned out to be a cruciate ligament injury.

== Personal life ==
Kevin's family are Assyrians and they moved to Sweden before he was born. He signed a sponsorship deal with Nike in September 2017.

== Career statistics ==
=== Club ===
As of match played 10 April 2026

Club	Season	League			National cup (Note: Includes Svenska Cupen, Danish Cup)		Total	
Club	Season	Division	Apps	Goals	Apps	Goals	Apps	Goals
BK Häcken	2018	Allsvenskan	1	1	1	0	2	1
BK Häcken	2019	Allsvenskan	0	0	0	0	0	0
BK Häcken	2020	Allsvenskan	2	0	1	0	3	0
BK Häcken	Total		3	1	2	0	5	1
Utsiktens BK (loan)	2020	Ettan	9	3	0	0	9	3
IFK Göteborg	2021	Allsvenskan	23	2	3	0	26	2
IFK Göteborg	2022	Allsvenskan	15	4	2	0	17	4
IFK Göteborg	Total		38	6	5	0	43	6
AGF	2022–23	Danish Superliga	24	3	3	2	27	5
AGF	2023–24	Danish Superliga	0	0	0	0	0	0
AGF	2024–25	Danish Superliga	0	0	0	0	0	0
AGF	2025–26	Danish Superliga	21	3	6	0	27	3
AGF	Total		45	6	9	2	54	8
Career total			95	16	16	2	111	18

=== International ===
As of match played 31 March 2026

Appearances and goals by national team and year
National team	Year	Apps	Goals
Iraq	2023	1	0
Iraq	2025	4	0
Iraq	2026	1	0
Total		6	0

== Honours ==
AGF

- Danish Superliga: 2025–26

Individual

- Danish Superliga Goal of the Year: 2025–26
- Danish Superliga Goal of the Month: February 2026
