= Tim van Assema =

Dutch footballer (born 2002)

Personal information
- Full name: Tim Johannes Barend Aloysius van Assema
- Date of birth: 31 January 2002 (age 24)
- Place of birth: Assendelft, Netherlands
- Height: 1.87 m (6 ft 2 in)
- Positions: Midfielder; defender

Team information
- Current team: Tvååkers IF
- Number: 21

Youth career
- –2013: SVA Assendelft
- 2014–2016: IFK Åmål
- 2016–2018: Säffle FF
- 2019–2021: IFK Göteborg

Senior career*
Years	Team	Apps	(Gls)
2018	Säffle FF 2	15	(4)
2018	Säffle FF	8	(1)
2019–2022	IFK Göteborg	2	(0)
2023–	Tvååkers IF	13	(0)
- * Club domestic league appearances and goals as of 16:15, 27 July 2023 (UTC)

Tim Johannes Barend Aloysius van Assema (born 31 January 2002) is a Dutch footballer who plays for Tvååkers IF as a midfielder.
