= Roger Gustafsson =

Swedish footballer and manager

Personal information
- Full name: Roger Gustafsson
- Date of birth: 29 February 1952 (age 74)
- Place of birth: Gothenburg, Sweden
- Position: Defender

Senior career*
Years	Team	Apps	(Gls)
1974–1979	GAIS		
- BK Häcken

Managerial career
- 1983–1989: IFK Göteborg (youth team)
- 1990–1995: IFK Göteborg
- 1996–1999: None
- 2002: IFK Göteborg
- * Club domestic league appearances and goals

Roger Gustafsson (born 29 February 1952, in Gothenburg) is a Swedish former football player and manager. He has played in the highest Swedish league, Allsvenskan, with GAIS, but is better known as the best performing manager in Allsvenskan ever, having won five Swedish championships with IFK Göteborg. He also took the club to the Champions League group stage twice and the quarter-finals of the same tournament once. He is still active in the club as leader of the youth section.

== Achievements ==
- Swedish championships (5): 1990, 1991, 1993, 1994, 1995
- Swedish cup wins (1): 1990–91
- Champions League (2): group stage 1992–93, quarter-finals 1994–95
