= Holger Hansson =

Swedish footballer (1927–2014)

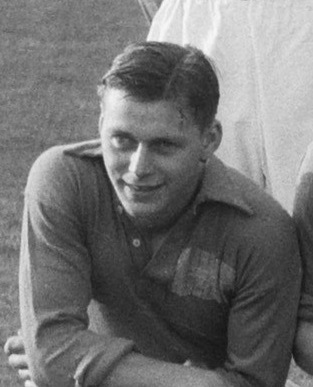

Personal information
- Full name: Holger Valdemar Hansson
- Date of birth: 26 January 1927
- Place of birth: Gothenburg, Sweden
- Date of death: 17 January 2014 (aged 86)
- Position: Defender

Senior career*
Years	Team	Apps	(Gls)
1946–1961	IFK Göteborg	254	(12)

International career
1952–1956	Sweden	9	(0)

Managerial career
- 1960: IK Brage
- 1961–1962: IFK Göteborg
- 1965–1967: GAIS
- 1970–1972: GAIS
- 1974: IFK Göteborg
Medal record
Men's football
Representing Sweden
Bronze medal – third place	1952 Helsinki	Team Competition
- * Club domestic league appearances and goals

Holger Valdemar Hansson (26 January 1927 – 17 January 2014) was a football player and coach. He was born in Gothenburg, Sweden. During his club career, Hansson played for IFK Göteborg. He won the bronze medal at the 1952 Summer Olympics. He later trained a number of teams, including IK Brage, IFK Göteborg, GAIS in Sweden.
