= Tobias Sana =

Swedish footballer (born 1989)

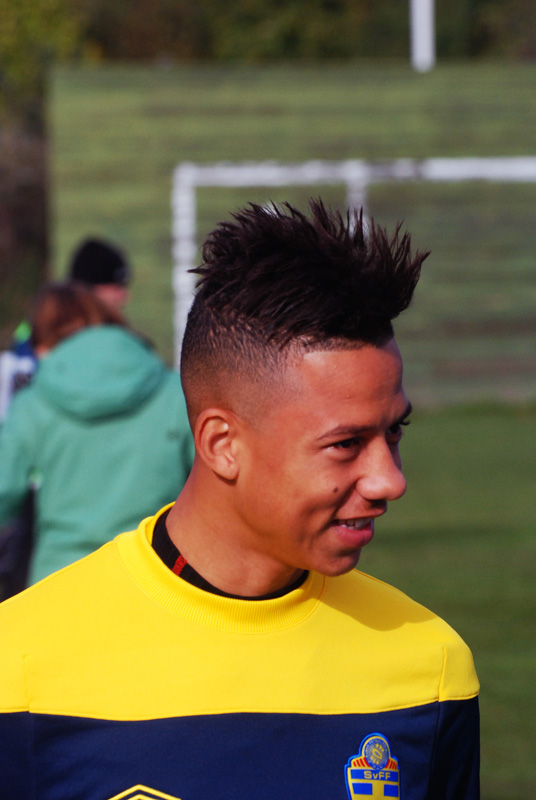
- Sana with Sweden in 2012

Personal information
- Full name: Tobias Tigjani Sana
- Date of birth: 11 July 1989 (age 37)
- Place of birth: Gothenburg, Sweden
- Height: 1.74 m (5 ft 9 in)
- Position: Attacking midfielder

Team information
- Current team: Örgryte IS
- Number: 22

Youth career
- Marieholm BoIK
- –2007: Västra Frölunda IF

Senior career*
Years	Team	Apps	(Gls)
2007–2008	Qviding FIF	28	(2)
2009–2012	IFK Göteborg	53	(3)
2009	→ Qviding FIF (loan)	7	(1)
2012–2015	Ajax	17	(4)
2013–2014	Jong Ajax	26	(3)
2015–2017	Malmö FF	31	(1)
2017–2019	AGF	68	(15)
2019–2022	IFK Göteborg	76	(12)
2022–2023	BK Häcken	19	(2)
2024–	Örgryte IS	58	(10)

International career
2012	Sweden	2	(0)
- * Club domestic league appearances and goals as of 9 July 2026

Tobias Tigjani Sana (born 11 July 1989) is a Swedish professional footballer who plays as an attacking midfielder for Allsvenskan club Örgryte IS.

== Club career ==
=== Qviding FIF ===
Sana began his professional football career in 2007–2008, playing for Qviding FIF, having spent his youth years playing for Marieholm BoIK, followed by Västra Frölunda IF, from where he was recruited to play for Qviding FIF in the Swedish Division 1 Södra and Superettan, the third and second tier of Swedish professional football. He made 28 appearances in two years, in the regular season for the club from Gothenburg, scoring twice.

=== IFK Göteborg ===
In 2009 Sana signed with IFK Göteborg making his debut in the Allsvenskan league, the top tier in Swedish football. A special clause in his contract allowed for him to return to his former club on a loan basis in 2009, before fully committing himself to IFK Göteborg. During the first half of the 2012 season Sana was a first team regular and rated among many as one of the team's best players. Despite that, the team had a disappointing season and Sana only scored two goals and made no assists.

=== AFC Ajax ===
On 1 August 2012, Sana signed a three-year deal with Dutch giants AFC Ajax. IFK Göteborg received €350,000 for the right-winger. On 19 August 2012, Sana earned his first start for AFC Ajax and immediately paid back the support from the manager by scoring his first two Eredivisie goals, and earning himself the Man of the Match award.

=== Malmö FF ===
Swedish champions Malmö FF announced on 14 January 2015 that they had signed Sana on a four-year contract.

=== AGF ===
On 8 July 2017, he signed a three-year contract with AGF, who play in the Danish Superliga.

=== IFK Göteborg ===
On 10 August 2019, Sana signed a three-year contract with IFK Göteborg and by doing so returned to the club he played for between 2009 and 2012.

At the beginning of May 2022, Sana was suspended from the club, which later led to him being forced to leave IFK Göteborg on 19 May 2022.

== International career ==
Born to a Burkinabé father and a Swedish mother, Sana has been eligible to represent either Burkina Faso or Sweden on international level. He chose to represent Sweden, his country of birth, receiving his first call up on 2 October 2012 to play in the World Cup qualifying matches against Faroe Islands and Germany. Not making an appearance against the Faroe Islands, he made his debut for Sweden on 16 October 2012 in the match against Germany, which ended in a 4–4 tie. His second appearance for Sweden came in the friendly match against England on 14 November 2012, which ended in a 4–2 win for Sweden.

== Personal life ==
Sana was born in Sweden, his father is from Burkina Faso, and his mother is from Sweden. Sana holds dual citizenship, but plays for the Sweden national team. Burkina Faso expressed interest in adding the young footballer to their national squad, however Sana expressed his desire to play for the Sweden national team, being the country of his birth. His younger brother Muba is also a footballer and plays for BK Häcken since 2012.

== Career statistics ==
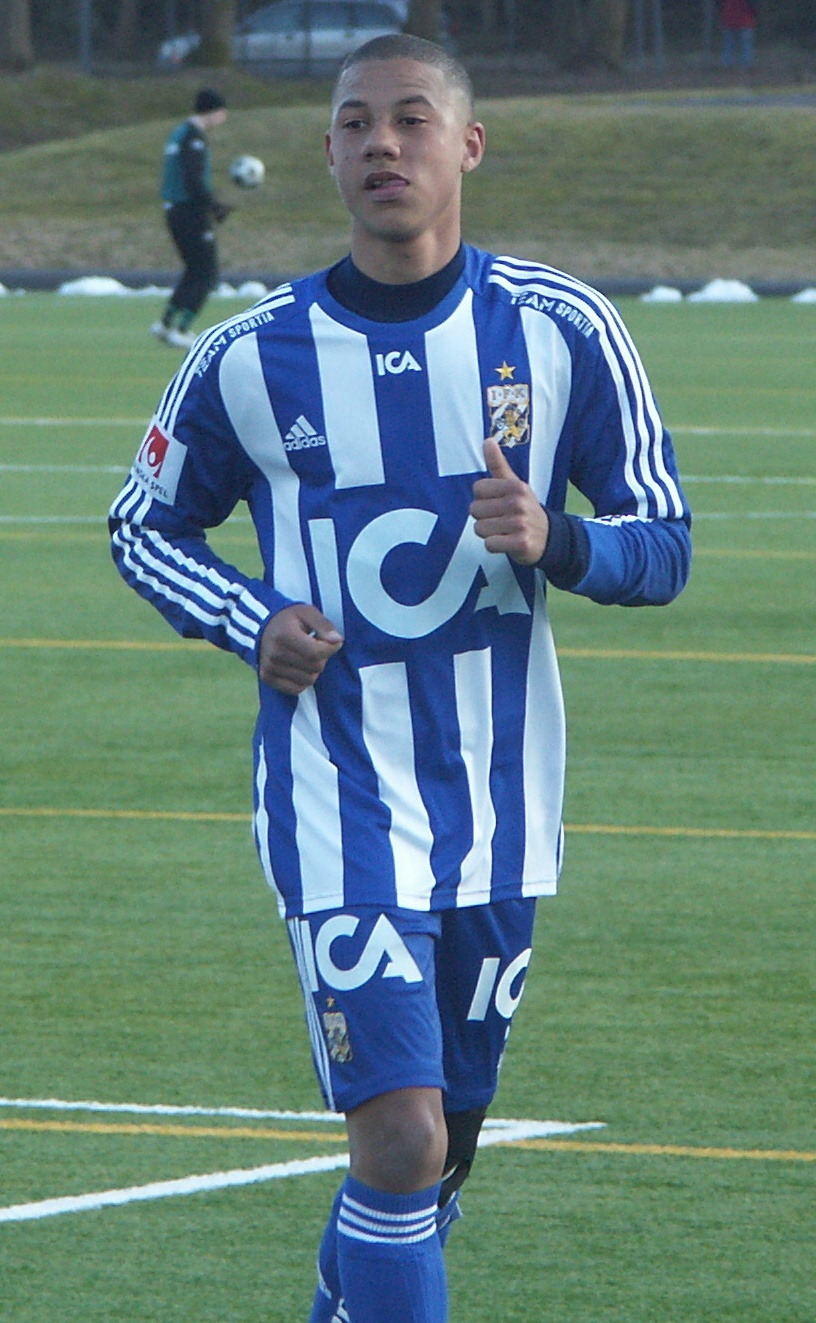
Tobias Sana playing for IFK Göteborg in 2009.

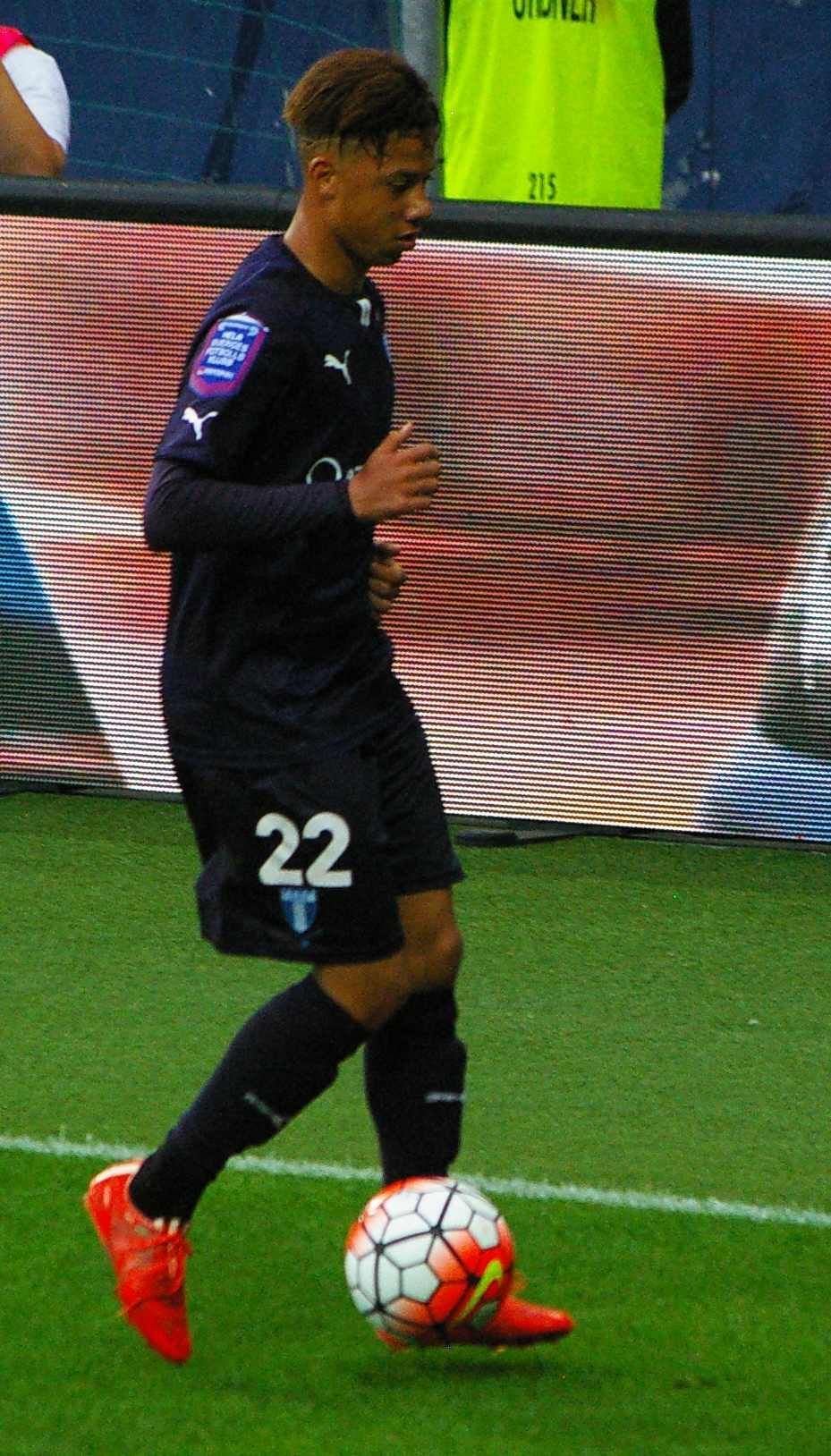
Tobias Sana playing for Malmö FF against FC Salzburg in 2015.

=== Club ===
As of match played on 26 November 2018.

Club	Season	League			Cup		Continental		Total	
Club	Season	Division	Apps	Goals	Apps	Goals	Apps	Goals	Apps	Goals
Qviding FIF	2007	Division 1	6	0	0	0	—		6	0
Qviding FIF	2008	Superettan	22	2	0	0	—		22	2
Qviding FIF	2009	Superettan	7	1	0	0	—		7	1
Qviding FIF	Total		35	3	0	0	0	0	35	3
IFK Göteborg	2009	Allsvenskan	5	0	3	0	0	0	8	0
IFK Göteborg	2010	Allsvenskan	11	1	2	0	0	0	13	1
IFK Göteborg	2011	Allsvenskan	26	0	3	0	—		29	0
IFK Göteborg	2012	Allsvenskan	11	2	0	0	—		11	2
IFK Göteborg	Total		53	3	8	0	0	0	61	3
Ajax	2012–13	Eredivisie	13	4	1	1	5	0	19	5
Ajax	2013–14	Eredivisie	4	0	0	0	0	0	4	0
Ajax	2014–15	Eredivisie	0	0	0	0	0	0	0	0
Ajax	Total		17	4	1	1	5	0	23	5
Jong Ajax (loan)	2013–14	Eerste Divisie	26	3	—		—		26	3
Jong Ajax (loan)	Total		26	3	0	0	0	0	26	3
Malmö FF	2015	Allsvenskan	19	0	3	1	5	0	27	1
Malmö FF	2016	Allsvenskan	11	1	3	0	—		14	1
Malmö FF	2017	Allsvenskan	1	0	1	0	0	0	2	0
Malmö FF	Total		31	1	7	1	5	0	43	2
AGF	2017–18	Danish Superliga	32	8	0	0	—		21	3
AGF	2018–19	Danish Superliga	14	3	1	0	—		15	3
AGF	Total		46	11	1	0	0	0	47	11
Career total			208	25	17	2	10	0	235	27

=== International ===
As of 14 November 2012

National team	Year	Apps	Goals
Sweden	2012	2	0
Total		2	0

== Honours ==
Ajax

- Eredivisie: 2012–13, 2013–14
- Johan Cruyff Shield: 2013

Malmö FF

- Allsvenskan: 2016

IFK Göteborg

- Svenska Cupen: 2019–20

BK Häcken

- Allsvenskan: 2022

Individual

- Årets ärkeängel (IFK Göteborg player who have shown great loyalty to the club): 2021
