= William Lundin =

Swedish footballer and manager

Personal information
- Full name: William Stefan Lundin
- Date of birth: 12 September 1992 (age 34)
- Place of birth: Gävle, Sweden
- Height: 1.83 m (6 ft 0 in)
- Position: Defender

Youth career
- –2004: Strömsbro IF
- 2004–2011: IFK Göteborg

Senior career*
Years	Team	Apps	(Gls)
2012–2013	Gefle IF	0	(0)

Managerial career
- 2017: Stenungsunds IF
- 2018–2022: FC Trollhättan
- 2023: IFK Göteborg (assistant)
- 2023: IFK Göteborg (caretaker)
- 2024–2025: Degerfors IF
- * Club domestic league appearances and goals

William Stefan Lundin (born 12 September 1992) is a Swedish football manager and former player. He is the son of former football manager and player Stefan Lundin.
