= Adam Ingi Benediktsson =

Icelandic footballer (born 2002)

Personal information
- Full name: Adam Ingi Benediktsson
- Date of birth: 28 October 2002 (age 24)
- Place of birth: Grundarfjörður, Iceland
- Height: 1.96 m (6 ft 5 in)
- Position: Goalkeeper

Team information
- Current team: AB
- Number: 54

Youth career
- –2016: FH
- 2017–2019: HK
- 2019–2021: IFK Göteborg

Senior career*
Years	Team	Apps	(Gls)
2021–2024	IFK Göteborg	9	(0)
2022	→ FC Trollhättan (loan)	8	(0)
2024	→ Västra Frölunda IF (loan)	1	(0)
2024–2025	Östersunds FK	18	(0)
2025–	AB	30	(0)

International career
2018	Iceland U16	1	(0)
2019	Iceland U17	2	(0)
2019	Iceland U18	1	(0)
2022–2024	Iceland U21	6	(0)
- * Club domestic league appearances and goals as of 18 June 2026

Adam Ingi Benediktsson (born 28 October 2002) is an Icelandic footballer who plays for Danish 2nd Division side AB as a goalkeeper.

== Career ==
On 19 June 2025, Benediktsson joined Danish 2nd Division side AB on a deal until June 2029.
