= Hussein Carneil =

Swedish footballer

Personal information
- Full name: Hussein Carneil
- Date of birth: 9 May 2003 (age 23)
- Place of birth: Mazar-i-Sharif, Afghanistan
- Height: 1.76 m (5 ft 9 in)
- Position: Attacking midfielder

Team information
- Current team: Halmstads BK
- Number: 14

Youth career
- IFK Trollhättan
- –2019: Skoftebyns IF
- 2019–2021: IFK Göteborg

Senior career*
Years	Team	Apps	(Gls)
2022–2025	IFK Göteborg	39	(1)
2025–2026	Atlético Sanluqueño	8	(0)
2026–	Halmstads BK	10	(2)

International career^{‡}
2023	Sweden U19	2	(0)
2022	Sweden U21	2	(0)
- * Club domestic league appearances and goals as of 9 July 2026 ‡ National team caps and goals as of 17:21, 16 October 2024 (UTC)

Hussein Carneil (born 9 May 2003) is a Swedish footballer who plays as an attacking midfielder for Allsvenskan club Halmstads BK. He began his professional career at IFK Göteborg.

== Personal life ==
Born in Afghanistan, he and his family fled the country when he was 3 years old.
