= HIF Akademi =

Swedish football club

- Full name: Helsingborgs Idrottsförening Akademi
- Founded: 2 March 2013
- Dissolved: 2016
- Ground: Olympia, Helsingborg
- Capacity: 17,200
- League: Division 2 Västra Götaland
| Home colours | Away colours |

HIF Akademi was a Swedish football club located in Helsingborg. The club was a feeder team to Helsingborgs IF.

== Background ==
HIF Akademi was created on 2 March 2013 after Helsingborgs IF took over the club Ramlösa Södra FF and renamed it Helsingborgs IF Akademi. They played their home matches at the Olympia in Helsingborg. The club was dissolved in 2016 as a result of the relegation of Helsingborgs IF to Superettan.

The club was affiliated to Skånes Fotbollförbund.
