= Alexander Jallow =

Swedish footballer

Personal information
- Full name: Alexander Jallow
- Date of birth: 3 March 1998 (age 28)
- Place of birth: Stockholm, Sweden
- Height: 1.83 m (6 ft 0 in)
- Position: Right-back

Team information
- Current team: IFK Göteborg
- Number: 17

Youth career
- –2013: Avesta AIK

Senior career*
Years	Team	Apps	(Gls)
2013	Avesta AIK U	6	(0)
2013–2014	Avesta AIK	32	(2)
2015–2016	IK Brage	33	(0)
2015	→ Avesta AIK (loan)	14	(0)
2017–2019	Jönköpings Södra IF	61	(14)
2020–2022	IFK Göteborg	75	(2)
2022–2025	Brescia	78	(3)
2026–	IFK Göteborg	13	(0)

International career
2015	Sweden U17	2	(0)
2015–2017	Sweden U19	8	(0)
2019	Sweden U21	1	(0)
- * Club domestic league appearances and goals as of 20:56, 2 August 2026 (UTC)

Alexander Jallow (born 3 March 1998) is a Swedish professional footballer who plays as a right-back for Allsvenskan club IFK Göteborg. Jallow has represented Sweden at youth level.

== Club career ==
On 29 February 2020 made Jallow his debut for IFK Göteborg in Svenska Cupen against Sollentuna FK. On 26 August 2022, Jallow signed with Italian club Brescia.

== International career ==
In December 2021, he was selected for the Swedish national team's January tour, which was to be played in Portugal. The tour was later cancelled.

== Personal life ==
Born in Sweden, Jallow is of Gambian descent.
