= Alfons Nygaard =

Swedish footballer

Personal information
- Full name: Alfons Bror Erik Nygaard
- Date of birth: 20 April 2002 (age 24)
- Place of birth: Anneberg, Sweden
- Height: 1.85 m (6 ft 1 in)
- Position: Forward

Team information
- Current team: Lunds BK

Youth career
- –2013: Annebergs IF
- 2014–2021: IFK Göteborg

Senior career*
Years	Team	Apps	(Gls)
2021–2022	IFK Göteborg	1	(0)
2023	Tvååkers IF	22	(3)
2024–2025	Onsala BK	51	(32)
2026–	Lunds BK	0	(0)
- * Club domestic league appearances and goals as of 21:28, 2 February 2026 (UTC)

Alfons Bror Erik Nygaard (born 20 April 2002) is a Swedish footballer who currently plays for Lunds BK as a forward.
