= Alexander Tengryd =

Swedish football manager

Personal information
- Full name: Lars Alexander Sampath Tengryd
- Date of birth: 29 January 1986 (age 40)
- Place of birth: Sri Lanka

Youth career
- Years: Team
- 1992–2004: Trelleborgs FF

Managerial career
- 2016: HIF Akademi
- 2018: Ängelholms FF
- 2019: Helsingborgs IF (assistant)
- 2019: Helsingborgs IF (caretaker)
- 2020–2021: Trelleborgs FF (assistant)
- 2022–2023: IFK Göteborg (assistant)
- 2023: IFK Göteborg (caretaker)
- 2025: Odds BK (caretaker)

Lars Alexander Sampath Tengryd (born 29 January 1986) is a Swedish football manager and former player, who most recently was caretaker manager of OBOS-ligaen club Odds BK.
