= Gustav Svensson =

Swedish footballer (born 1987)

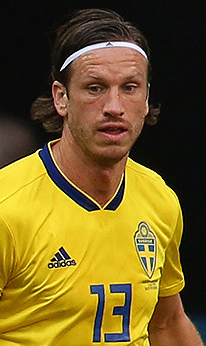
- Svensson with Sweden at the 2018 FIFA World Cup

Personal information
- Full name: Karl Gustav Johan Svensson
- Date of birth: 7 February 1987 (age 39)
- Place of birth: Gothenburg, Sweden
- Height: 1.84 m (6 ft 0 in)
- Positions: Defensive midfielder; centre-back

Youth career
- 1999–2000: Azalea BK
- 2000–2001: ES Le Cannet-Rocheville
- 2001–2005: IFK Göteborg

Senior career*
Years	Team	Apps	(Gls)
2005–2010	IFK Göteborg	101	(8)
2010–2012	Bursaspor	28	(0)
2012–2014	Tavriya Simferopol	21	(0)
2014–2015	IFK Göteborg	52	(1)
2016	Guangzhou R&F	28	(0)
2017–2020	Seattle Sounders FC	90	(4)
2021	Guangzhou City	5	(0)
2021–2025	IFK Göteborg	128	(4)
Total		453	(17)

International career
2007–2009	Sweden U21	24	(1)
2009–2021	Sweden	32	(0)
- * Club domestic league appearances and goals

Karl Gustav Johan Svensson (born 7 February 1987) is a Swedish former professional footballer who played as a defensive midfielder and centre-back. Starting off his footballing career in Sweden with IFK Göteborg in 2005, he went on to play professionally in Turkey, Ukraine, China, and the United States before returning to Sweden in 2021. A full international between 2009 and 2021, Svensson won 32 caps for the Sweden national team and represented his country at the 2018 FIFA World Cup as well as UEFA Euro 2020.

== Club career ==
=== IFK Göteborg ===
He played for a local team in Gothenburg as well as a French team in his youth but joined IFK Göteborg at the age of 14. He played there until 2010 and won the Swedish Championship with the club in 2007. Gustav was nominated as the Newcomer of the year in Swedish football the same season but lost out to Johan Oremo.

=== Bursaspor ===
On 1 September 2010, he signed a three-year contract with 2009–10 Süper Lig champions Bursaspor.

=== Tavriya Simferopol ===
On 7 July 2012, he signed a three-year contract with Ukrainian club Tavriya Simferopol. According to Svensson he was forced to flee Tavriya's native soil Crimea by bus during the 2014 Russian annexation of Crimea.

=== Return to IFK Göteborg ===
On 23 March 2014, he signed a four-year contract with his former club IFK Göteborg.

=== Guangzhou R&F ===
On 14 January 2016, he signed a three-year contract with Chinese club Guangzhou R&F.

=== Seattle Sounders FC ===
On 30 January 2017, Svensson joined MLS side Seattle Sounders FC. Svensson made his Sounders debut in the opening game of the 2017 season, starting at right back in a 2–1 loss to Houston. While he has also played as a center back, Svensson primarily played as a defensive midfielder for the Sounders.

=== Guangzhou City ===
On 9 April 2021, Svensson returned to Chinese Super League side Guangzhou City.

=== Second return to IFK Göteborg ===
On 22 July 2021, Svensson returned to IFK Göteborg for the second time, signing a two-and-a-half-year contract.

== International career ==
=== Youth ===
Making his debut in 2007, Svensson played 24 games for the Sweden under-21 team and was a part of the U21 team that reached the semi-finals of the 2009 UEFA European Under-21 Championship.

=== Senior ===
In May 2018, he was named in Sweden's 23 man squad for the 2018 World Cup in Russia. At the 2018 World Cup, Svensson played in three games for Sweden as they were eliminated by England in the quarter-final. He started and played the full 90 minutes in the second-round game against Switzerland.

On 8 September 2020, Svensson was sent off for the first time in his senior international career in the first half after two yellow cards in Sweden's game against Portugal in the 2020–21 UEFA Nations League. He served as Sweden's team captain for the first time in a friendly game against Denmark on 11 November 2020, in his 30th international appearance.

In May 2021, he was named in Sweden's 26-man squad for UEFA Euro 2020. He appeared in the 1–0 group stage win against Slovakia as Sweden reached the round of 16 before being eliminated by Ukraine. Svensson announced his retirement from international football following the tournament, having won 32 caps for his country between 2009 and 2021.

== Career statistics ==
=== Club ===
As of 13 December 2021

Club	Season	League			National Cup		Continental		Other		Total	
Club	Season	Division	Apps	Goals	Apps	Goals	Apps	Goals	Apps	Goals	Apps	Goals
IFK Göteborg	2005	Allsvenskan	0	0	0	0	2	0	—		2	0
IFK Göteborg	2006	Allsvenskan	5	1	0	0	0	0	—		5	1
IFK Göteborg	2007	Allsvenskan	22	1	6	0	—		—		28	1
IFK Göteborg	2008	Allsvenskan	27	3	3	0	3	0	—		33	3
IFK Göteborg	2009	Allsvenskan	29	2	4	0	2	0	—		35	2
IFK Göteborg	2010	Allsvenskan	18	1	2	0	2	0	—		22	1
IFK Göteborg	Total		101	8	15	0	9	0	—		125	8
Bursaspor	2010–11	Süper Lig	16	0	3	0	5	0	—		24	0
Bursaspor	2011–12	Süper Lig	9	0	1	0	2	0	3	0	15	0
Bursaspor	Total		25	0	4	0	7	0	3	0	39	0
Tavriya Simferopol	2012–13	Ukrainian Premier League	11	0	2	0	—		—		13	0
Tavriya Simferopol	2013–14	Ukrainian Premier League	10	0	0	0	—		—		10	0
Tavriya Simferopol	Total		21	0	2	0	0	0	—		23	0
IFK Göteborg	2014	Allsvenskan	24	0	0	0	5	0	—		29	0
IFK Göteborg	2015	Allsvenskan	28	1	5	0	4	0	—		37	1
IFK Göteborg	Total		52	1	5	0	9	0	—		66	1
Guangzhou R&F	2016	Chinese Super League	28	0	5	0	—		—		33	0
Seattle Sounders FC	2017	Major League Soccer	32	1	5	1	—		—		37	2
Seattle Sounders FC	2018	Major League Soccer	24	3	2	0	4	0	—		30	3
Seattle Sounders FC	2019	Major League Soccer	22	0	4	1	—		—		26	1
Seattle Sounders FC	2020	Major League Soccer	12	0	2	1	0	0	1 (Note: MLS is Back Tournament knockout stage.)	0	15	1
Seattle Sounders FC	Total		90	4	13	3	4	0	1	0	108	7
Guangzhou City	2021	Chinese Super League	5	0	0	0	—		—		5	0
IFK Göteborg	2021	Allsvenskan	19	0	0	0	—		—		19	0
Career total			341	13	44	3	29	0	4	0	418	16

=== International ===
Appearances and goals by national team and year
National team	Year	Apps	Goals
Sweden	2009	2	0
Sweden	2010	0	0
Sweden	2011	0	0
Sweden	2012	0	0
Sweden	2013	0	0
Sweden	2014	0	0
Sweden	2015	2	0
Sweden	2016	2	0
Sweden	2017	4	0
Sweden	2018	10	0
Sweden	2019	7	0
Sweden	2020	3	0
Sweden	2021	2	0
Total		32	0

== Honours ==
IFK Göteborg

- Allsvenskan: 2007
- Svenska Cupen: 2008, 2014–15
- Svenska Supercupen: 2008

Seattle Sounders FC

- MLS Cup: 2019

Individual

- Årets Ärkeängel: 2023
