= Johan Bångsbo =

Swedish footballer (born 2003)

Personal information
- Full name: Mats Johan Edward Bångsbo
- Date of birth: 10 February 2003 (age 23)
- Place of birth: Kungsbacka, Sweden
- Height: 1.91 m (6 ft 3 in)
- Position: Centre-back

Team information
- Current team: Al Jazira
- Number: 14

Youth career
- –2014: Särö IK
- 2015–2021: IFK Göteborg

Senior career*
Years	Team	Apps	(Gls)
2022–2023	IFK Göteborg	38	(1)
2024–	Al Jazira	2	(0)
2024–2025	→ Baniyas (loan)	21	(1)
2025–2026	→ Dibba (loan)	4	(0)

International career^{‡}
2022–2023	Sweden U19	3	(0)
2022–2023	Sweden U21	2	(0)
- * Club domestic league appearances and goals as of 11:19, 12 January 2025 (UTC) ‡ National team caps and goals as of 17:06, 16 October 2024 (UTC)

Mats Johan Edward Bångsbo (born 10 February 2003) is a Swedish professional footballer who plays for UAE Pro League club Al Jazira as a centre-back.
