= Mohammed Al-Hakim =

Swedish-Iraqi football referee (born 1985)

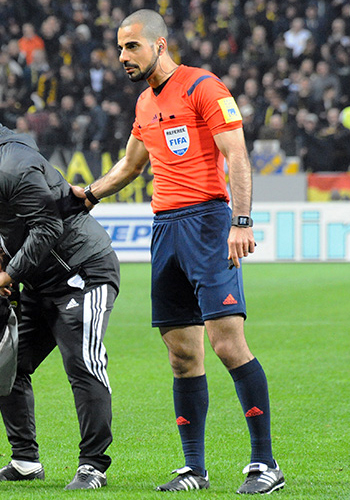
- Al-Hakim in 2015
- Full name: Mohammed Al-Hakim
- Born: 15 April 1985 (age 41); Najaf, Iraq
- Other occupation: Commissioned officer

Domestic
Years	League	Role
2011–	Superettan	Referee
2012–	Allsvenskan	Referee

International
Years	League	Role
2015–	FIFA listed	Referee

Mohammed Al-Hakim (Arabic: محمد الحكيم; born 15 April 1985) is a Swedish Iraqi football referee. Born in Iraq, Al-Hakim moved to Sweden with his family when he was eight years old and settled in Köping, where he still resides.

He became a professional referee in 2008 and has been an Allsvenskan referee since 2012. Al-Hakim has refereed 95 matches in Allsvenskan and 39 matches in Superettan as of January 2017. In 2015, he also became a FIFA referee.

Al-Hakim received much praise from both football pundits and supporters during his officiating in the 2015 season. After the season, he was selected as "Referee of the year" by the Svenska Fotbollförbundet and received a prize at the annual Fotbollsgalan. In August 2015, he was also noticed for his activities on social media, when he started a Facebook page where he openly answered questions regarding his own in-game-decisions. Al-Hakim later closed the profile, citing "lack of time" as the major cause.

Outside of football, he works part-time as an officer in the Swedish Armed Forces.

== Legal issues ==
In 2021, it was announced that Al-Hakim had avoided paying taxes on UEFA compensation for years by not reporting the compensation to the Swedish Tax Agency.

== See also ==
- List of football referees
