= Lucas Kåhed =

Swedish footballer

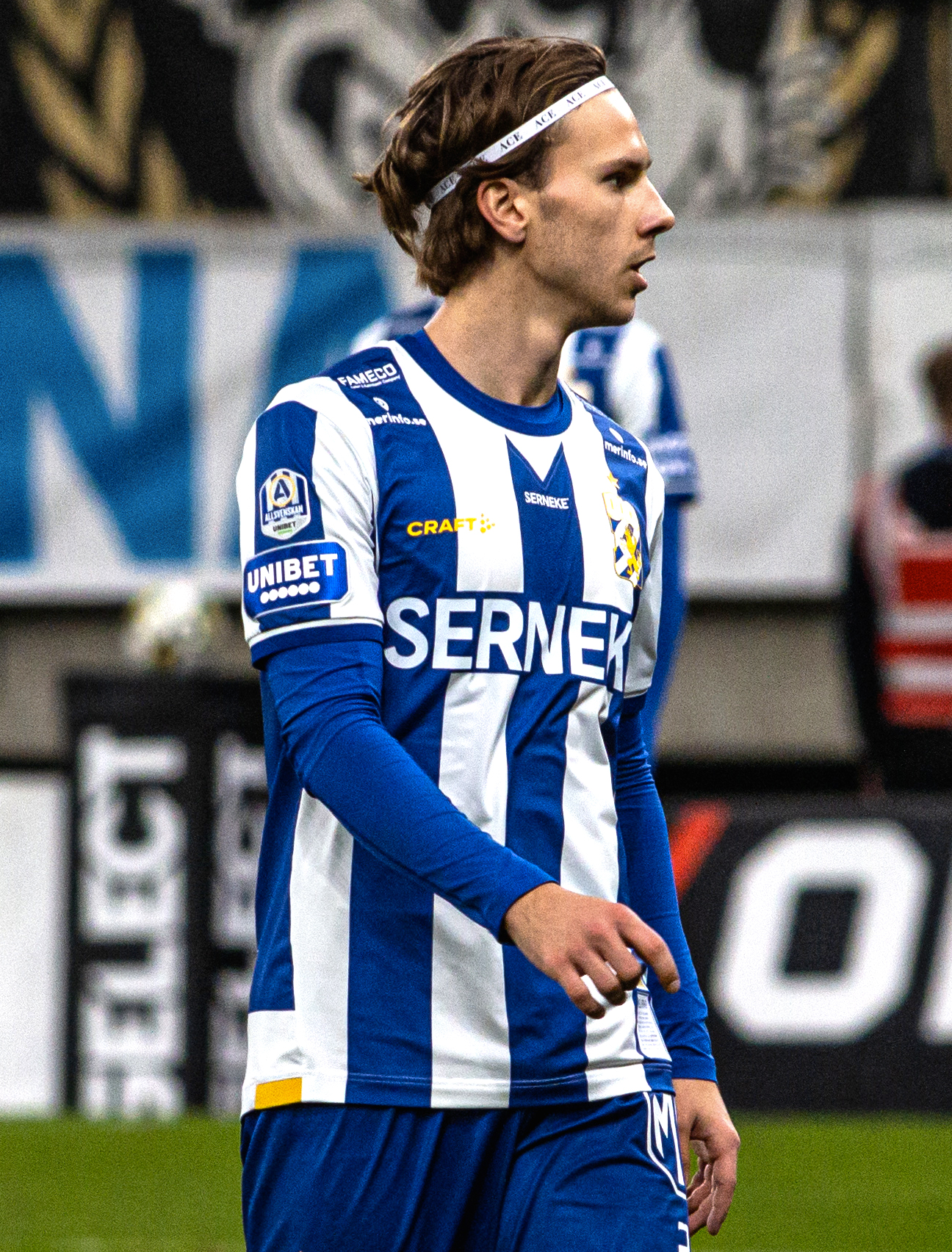

Personal information
- Full name: Lucas Carl-Fredrik Kåhed
- Date of birth: 26 July 2002 (age 24)
- Place of birth: Säffle, Sweden
- Height: 1.72 m (5 ft 8 in)
- Position: Attacking midfielder

Team information
- Current team: Varbergs BoIS
- Number: 12

Youth career
- –2018: Säffle FF
- 2018–2021: IFK Göteborg

Senior career*
Years	Team	Apps	(Gls)
2017	Säffle FF 3	2	(0)
2017–2018	Säffle FF 2	11	(4)
2018	Säffle FF	10	(0)
2021–2026	IFK Göteborg	30	(1)
2026–	Varbergs BoIS	8	(1)

International career
2017–2018	Sweden U17	11	(0)
- * Club domestic league appearances and goals as of 11 November 2026

Lucas Carl-Fredrik Kåhed (born 26 July 2002) is a Swedish footballer who plays as an attacking midfielder for Varbergs BoIS. He last played for IFK Göteborg.
