= Påskbergsvallen =

Sports venue in Varberg, Sweden

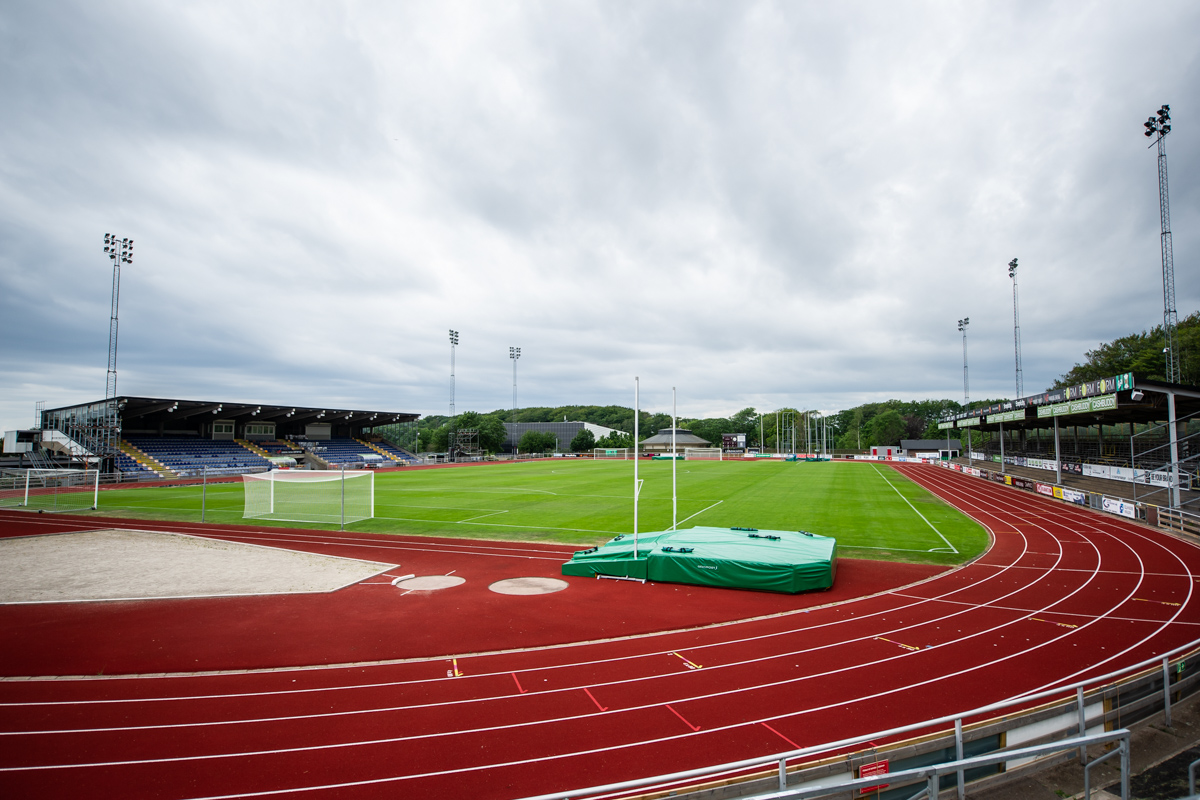
- Påskbergsvallen

- Location within Sweden
- Location: Varberg, Sweden
- Coordinates: 57°5′49″N 12°15′50″E
- Operator: Varbergs BoIS
- Capacity: 4,500
- Type: Stadium
- Events: sporting events (Football, track and field athletics)

Construction
- Opened: 2 July 1925

Påskbergsvallen, 2020–2022 known as Varberg Energi Arena for sponsorship reasons, is a football and track and field athletics stadium in Varberg, Sweden and the home stadium for the football team Varbergs BoIS. Påskbergsvallen has a total capacity of 4,500 spectators.

It was inaugurated on 2 July, 1925, by King Gustaf V of Sweden.
