= Gustaf Norlin =

Swedish footballer (born 1997)

Personal information
- Full name: Axel Gustaf Norlin
- Date of birth: 9 January 1997 (age 29)
- Place of birth: Lidköping, Sweden
- Height: 1.83 m (6 ft 0 in)
- Positions: Striker; winger; wing-back

Team information
- Current team: Miedź Legnica
- Number: 11

Youth career
- IF Heimer
- Lidköpings FK

Senior career*
Years	Team	Apps	(Gls)
2013–2014	Lidköpings FK Akademi	2	(0)
2014–2017	Lidköpings FK	75	(8)
2018–2019	Skövde AIK	55	(9)
2020	Varbergs BoIS	28	(5)
2021–2024	IFK Göteborg	108	(16)
2025–2026	ŁKS Łódź	44	(3)
2026–	Miedź Legnica	0	(0)
- * Club domestic league appearances and goals as of 15:43, 29 May 2026 (UTC)

Axel Gustaf Norlin (born 9 January 1997) is a Swedish professional footballer who plays as a forward, winger or wing-back for I liga club Miedź Legnica.

== Career ==
Norlin made his Allsvenskan debut on the 15 June 2020 in a 3–0 win over Helsingborgs IF, scoring the third and final goal in the 62nd minute.
