= Stora Valla =

Stadium in Degerfors, Sweden

Coordinates: 59°14′18″N 14°26′35″E

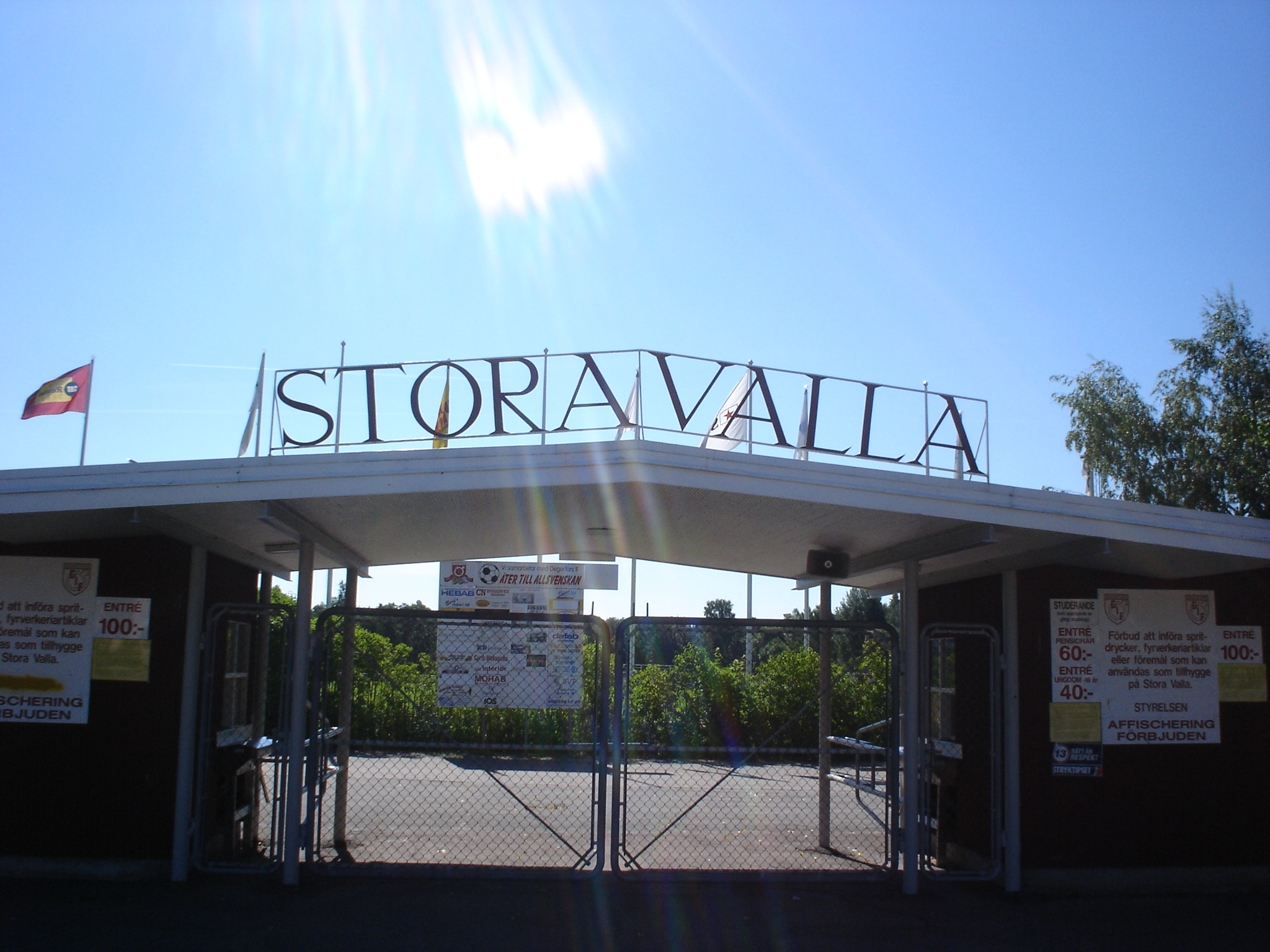
- Entrance at Stora Valla.
- Interactive map of Stora Valla
- Location: Degerfors, Sweden
- Capacity: 10,605

Construction
- Opened: 24 July 1938

Tenant
- Degerfors IF

Stora Valla is a multi-use stadium in Degerfors, Sweden. It is currently used mostly for football matches and hosts the home matches of Degerfors IF. The stadium holds 12,500 people and opened in 1938. The record attendance is 21,065 spectators, when Degerfors IF played IFK Norrköping, 1963.
