= Valhalla IP =

Sports ground in Gothenburg, Sweden

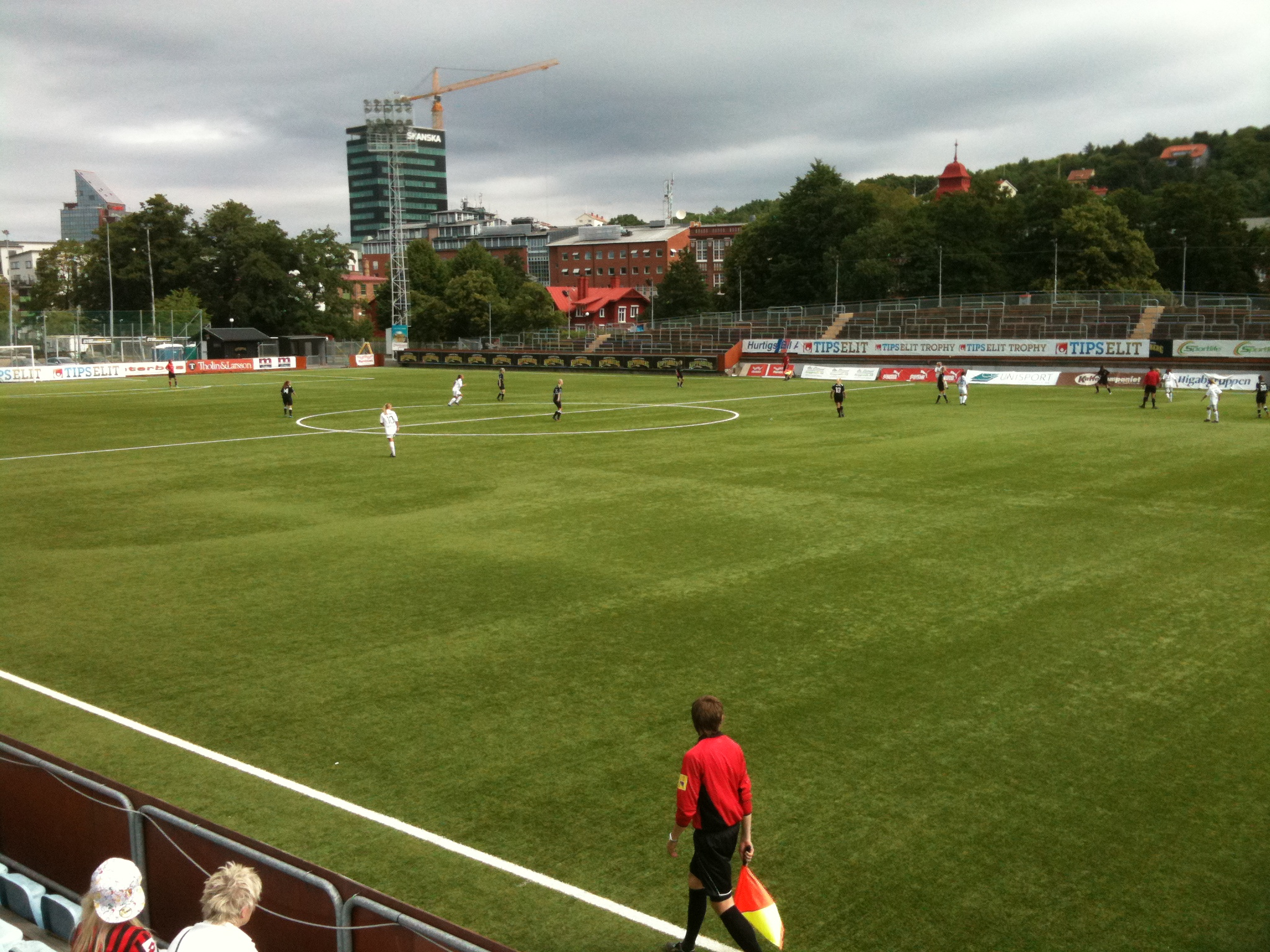
- Interactive map of Valhalla IP
- Full name: Valhalla Idrottsplats
- Location: Gothenburg, Sweden
- Coordinates: 57°42′5.4″N 11°59′25.1″E
- Owner: Higab
- Operator: Got Event
- Capacity: 4,000
- Surface: Artificial
- Field size: 105 X 65 meter

Construction
- Built: 1964
- Opened: 1964

Tenants
- IFK Göteborg (women) (2022–present); Göteborgs DFF (2013–present); Kopparbergs/Göteborg FC (2006–2020); Qviding FIF (2008–present); Örgryte IS (2007–2008, 2014)

Valhalla IP is a stadium in Gothenburg, Sweden which is currently home to IFK Göteborg (women), Göteborgs DFF and Qviding FIF. The stadium is situated close the river Mölndalsån and Burgårdsparken of the town and is named after the Valhalla (Old Norse Valhöll, "Hall of the Slain") is Odin's hall in Norse mythology. The capacity of the stadium is 4,000, where 1,200 are seated. Valhalla IP had an artificial pitch added in October 2006.

On 19 October 2008, during a football match between Örgryte IS and FC Väsby United, after one minute of play a railing in the stands collapsed when fans celebrated a goal scored by Marcus Allbäck. Up to forty spectators fell down on the field, a few suffered minor injuries and one spectator was taken to hospital.

It also hosted some Sweden men's national football team games.

== See also ==
- Scandinavium
- Ullevi
