= 2024 IFK Göteborg season =

IFK Göteborg
2024 season
- Chairman: Richard Berkling
- Head coach: Jens Berthel Askou (until 15 June); Stefan Billborn (from 25 June)
- Stadium: Gamla Ullevi
- Allsvenskan: 13th
- 2023–24 Svenska Cupen: Group stage
- Top goalscorer: League: Paulos Abraham (7); All: Paulos Abraham (7)
- Highest home attendance: 18,051 vs. GAIS (30 September 2024, Allsvenskan)
- Lowest home attendance: 5,074 vs. Skövde AIK (25 February 2024, Svenska Cupen); Allsvenskan: 15,743 vs. Mjällby AIF (21 May 2024)
- Average home league attendance: 16,846
- Biggest win: 3–0 vs. IF Brommapojkarna (29 April 2024, Allsvenskan)
- Biggest defeat: 0–3 vs. Djurgårdens IF (3 March 2024, Svenska Cupen); 1–4 vs. Djurgårdens IF (1 April 2024, Allsvenskan); 0–3 vs. Malmö FF (13 May 2024, Allsvenskan); 2–5 vs. AIK (27 May 2024, Allsvenskan)
Home colours	Away colours

The 2024 season was IFK Göteborg's 119th in existence, their 92nd season in Allsvenskan and their 48th consecutive season in the league. They competed in Allsvenskan and Svenska Cupen. League play started on 1 April and ended on 10 November.

== Players ==
=== Squad ===
Note: Flags indicate national team as defined under FIFA eligibility rules; some limited exceptions apply. Players may hold more than one non-FIFA nationality.

No.	Pos.	Nation	Player
1	GK	(Sweden) SWE	Pontus Dahlberg
2	DF	(Sweden) SWE	Emil Salomonsson (3rd captain)
3	DF	(Sweden) SWE	August Erlingmark
4	DF	(Ghana) GHA	Rockson Yeboah
5	MF	(Sweden) SWE	Sebastian Ohlsson
6	DF	(Norway) NOR	Anders Trondsen
7	FW	(Sweden) SWE	Oscar Pettersson
8	DF	(Denmark) DEN	Jonas Bager
9	FW	(Denmark) DEN	Laurs Skjellerup
10	FW	(Sweden) SWE	Hussein Carneil
11	FW	(Sweden) SWE	Paulos Abraham (on loan from Groningen)
12	GK	(Norway) NOR	Jacob Karlstrøm (on loan from Molde FK)
13	DF	(Sweden) SWE	Gustav Svensson (vice-captain)
14	FW	(Sweden) SWE	Gustaf Norlin

No.	Pos.	Nation	Player
15	MF	(Denmark) DEN	David Kruse
16	FW	(Sweden) SWE	Linus Carlstrand
17	DF	(Sweden) SWE	Oscar Wendt (captain)
19	FW	(Albania) ALB	Arbnor Muçolli
20	FW	(Nigeria) NGA	Suleiman Abdullahi
21	MF	(Sweden) SWE	Adam Carlén
22	FW	(Denmark) DEN	Nikolai Baden (on loan from Lyngby BK)
23	MF	(Iceland) ISL	Kolbeinn Þórðarson
25	GK	(Sweden) SWE	Elis Bishesari
26	MF	(Sweden) SWE	Benjamin Brantlind
28	MF	(Sweden) SWE	Lucas Kåhed
29	DF	(Denmark) DEN	Thomas Santos
30	MF	(Sweden) SWE	Ramon Pascal Lundqvist
34	GK	(Norway) NOR	Anders Kristiansen (on loan from Sarpsborg 08)

== Club ==
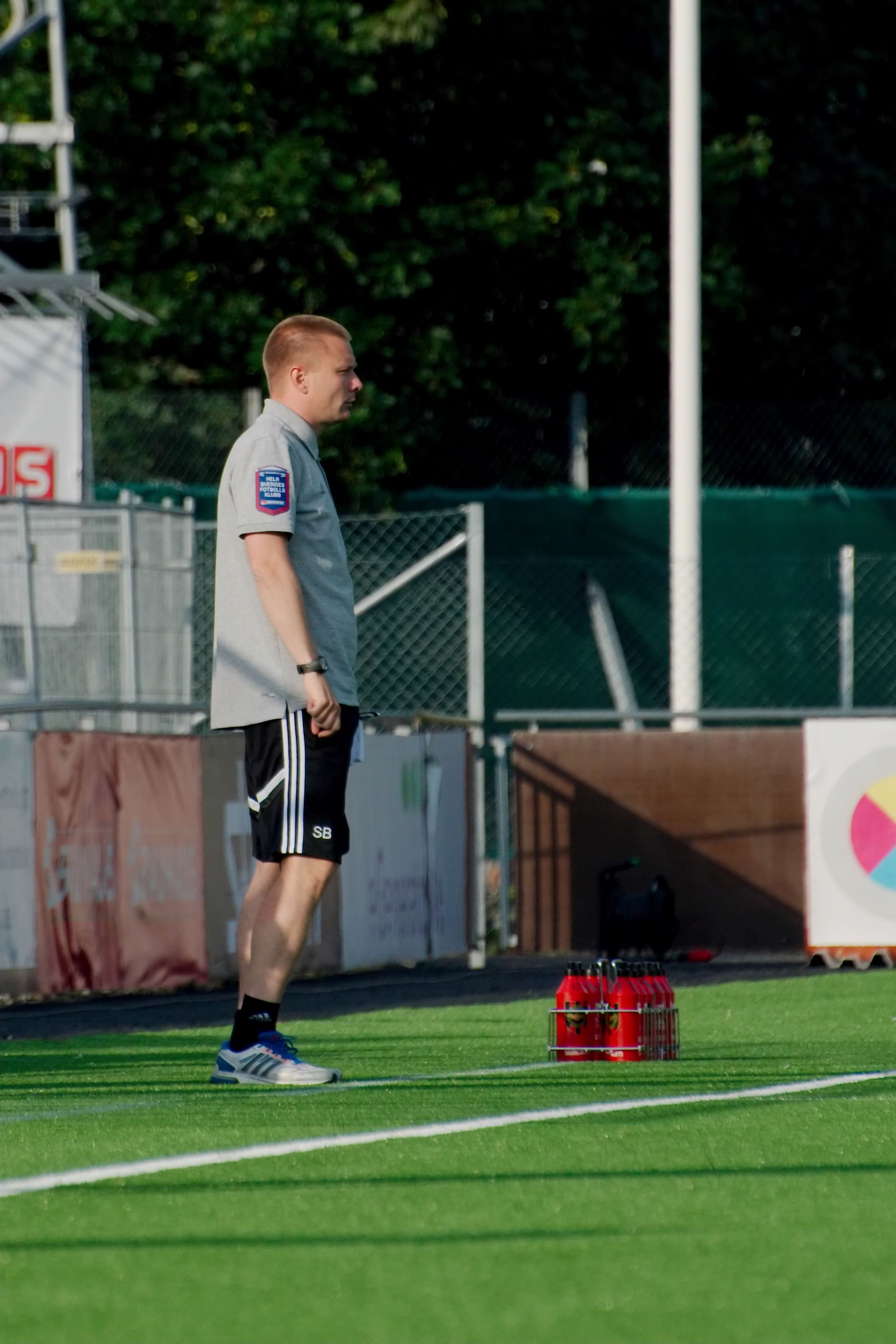
The 2024 season was Stefan Billborn's first season at IFK Göteborg.

=== Coaching staff ===
Name	Role
(Sweden) Stefan Billborn	Head coach
(Sweden) Joachim Björklund	Assistant coach
(Scotland) Lee Baxter	Goalkeeping coach
(Sweden) Magnus Edlund	Football developer
(Sweden) Marcus Berg	Player developer
(Sweden) Marwan Salman	Analyst
(Sweden) Kalle Olsson	Strength and conditioning coach
(Sweden) Fredrik Larsson	Physiotherapist
(Sweden) Kaj Leuther	Physiotherapist
(Sweden) Calle Persson	Physiotherapist
(Norway) Stig Torbjørnsen	Head scout
(Sweden) David Vuković	Sports assistant
(Sweden) Rolf Gustavsson	Equipment manager
(Sweden) Håkan Lindahl	Equipment manager

=== Other information ===
Chairman	(Sweden) Richard Berkling
Club director	(Sweden) Håkan Mild
Technical director	(Sweden) Ola Larsson
Team manager	(Sweden) Hannes Stiller
Ground (capacity and dimensions)	Gamla Ullevi (18,454 / 105x68 m)

Source: IFK Göteborg and Gamla Ullevi

== Competitions ==
=== Overall ===
Competition	Started round	Final position / round	First match	Last match
Allsvenskan	Matchday 1	13th	1 April 2024	10 November 2024
2023–24 Svenska Cupen	Round 2	Group stage	23 August 2023	3 March 2024

Updated to match played 10 November 2024
Source: Competitions

=== Allsvenskan ===
==== League table ====
Pos	Team	Pld	W	D	L	GF	GA	GD	Pts	Qualification or relegation
11	IFK Norrköping	30	9	7	14	36	57	−21	34	
12	Halmstads BK	30	10	3	17	32	50	−18	33	
13	IFK Göteborg	30	7	10	13	33	43	−10	31	
14	IFK Värnamo (O)	30	7	10	13	30	40	−10	31	Qualification for the Allsvenskan play-off
15	Kalmar FF (R)	30	8	6	16	38	58	−20	30	Relegation to Superettan

Source: svenskfotboll.se (in Swedish)
Rules for classification: 1) Points; 2) Goal difference; 3) Goals scored; 4) Head-to-head points; 5) Head-to-head goal difference; 6) Head-to-head away goals scored; 7) Play-off
(Note: Play-off is only played if need to decide champion, teams for relegation or UEFA competition and will be played on a neutral ground).
(O) Play-off winners; (R) Relegated

==== Results summary ====
Overall								Home						Away					
Pld	W	D	L	GF	GA	GD	Pts	W	D	L	GF	GA	GD	W	D	L	GF	GA	GD
30	7	10	13	33	43	−10	31	3	6	6	14	20	−6	4	4	7	19	23	−4

Last updated: 10 November 2024.
Source: svenskfotboll.se (in Swedish)

==== Results by round ====
Round	1	2	3	4	5	6	7	8	9	10	11	12	13	14	15	16	17	18	19	20	21	22	23	24	25	26	27	28	29	30
Ground	H	A	A	H	H	A	A	H	A	H	A	H	A	A	H	H	A	H	H	A	H	A	H	A	H	A	H	A	H	A
Result	L	L	W	D	L	W	L	L	D	W	L	W	L	W	D	L	D	D	D	L	L	D	D	D	W	W	L	L	D	L
Position	13	15	11	12	12	11	12	14	14	12	13	13	13	13	12	13	13	13	12	12	12	12	13	13	11	11	11	12	13	13

Source: see below
A = Away; H = Home; W = Win; D = Draw; L = Loss

==== Matches ====
Kickoff times are in UTC+2 unless stated otherwise.

1 April 2024 Round 1	IFK Göteborg	1–4	Djurgårdens IF	Gothenburg
14:00	Abraham 84'	Report	Danielson 39' (pen.); L. Bergvall 45+7'; Tenho 72'; Gulliksen 76'	Stadium: Gamla Ullevi; Attendance: 17,879; Referee: Glenn Nyberg

7 April 2024 Round 2	Halmstads BK	1–0	IFK Göteborg	Halmstad
14:00	Baffoe 2'	Report		Stadium: Örjans Vall; Attendance: 10,011; Referee: Victor Wolf

14 April 2024 Round 3	Kalmar FF	0–1	IFK Göteborg	Kalmar
14:00		Report	Muçolli 46'	Stadium: Guldfågeln Arena; Attendance: 6,576; Referee: Joakim Östling

20 April 2024 Round 4	IFK Göteborg	1–1	IFK Norrköping	Gothenburg
15:00	Abraham 40'	Report	Traustason 33'	Stadium: Gamla Ullevi; Attendance: 16,861; Referee: Adam Ladebäck

24 April 2024 Round 5	IFK Göteborg	0–1	BK Häcken	Gothenburg
19:00		Report	Layouni 45+6'	Stadium: Gamla Ullevi; Attendance: 17,022; Referee: Kristoffer Karlsson

29 April 2024 Round 6	IF Brommapojkarna	0–3	IFK Göteborg	Stockholm
19:00		Report	Santos 5'; Skjellerup 64'; Yalcouyé 83'	Stadium: Grimsta IP; Attendance: 2,289; Referee: Oscar Johnson

6 May 2024 Round 7	GAIS	2–1	IFK Göteborg	Gothenburg
19:10	Henriksson 33'; Ahl Holmström 76'	Report	Abraham 90+4'	Stadium: Gamla Ullevi; Attendance: 16,646; Referee: Victor Wolf

13 May 2024 Round 8	IFK Göteborg	0–3	Malmö FF	Gothenburg
19:10		Report	Botheim 34'; Rieks 42'; Berg Johnsen 88'	Stadium: Gamla Ullevi; Attendance: 17,316; Referee: Mohammed Al-Hakim

16 May 2024 Round 9	IK Sirius	2–2	IFK Göteborg	Uppsala
19:00	Milleskog 35'; Salech 70'	Report	Pettersson 63'; Abraham 75'	Stadium: Studenternas IP; Attendance: 6,961; Referee: Kristoffer Karlsson

21 May 2024 Round 10	IFK Göteborg	1–0	Mjällby AIF	Gothenburg
19:00	Norlin 89'	Report		Stadium: Gamla Ullevi; Attendance: 15,743; Referee: Glenn Nyberg

27 May 2024 Round 11	AIK	5–2	IFK Göteborg	Solna
19:10	Faraj 34'; Salétros 67'; Svensson 75' (o.g.); Beširović 90+4'; Pittas 90+7'	Report	Pettersson 26'; Wendt 51'	Stadium: Friends Arena; Attendance: 25,932; Referee: Victor Wolf

1 June 2024 Round 12	IFK Göteborg	1–0	IF Elfsborg	Gothenburg
15:00	Norlin 34'	Report		Stadium: Gamla Ullevi; Attendance: 17,183; Referee: Adam Ladebäck

7 July 2024 Round 13	IFK Värnamo	2–0	IFK Göteborg	Värnamo
14:00	Kalu 53'; Zeljković 57'	Report		Stadium: Finnvedsvallen; Attendance: 4,277; Referee: Mohammed Al-Hakim

15 July 2024 Round 14	Hammarby IF	0–1	IFK Göteborg	Stockholm
19:00		Report	Abraham 23'	Stadium: Tele2 Arena; Attendance: 26,062; Referee: Joakim Östling

21 July 2024 Round 15	IFK Göteborg	1–1	Västerås SK	Gothenburg
16:30	Abraham 48'	Report	Boudah 90+9'	Stadium: Gamla Ullevi; Attendance: 17,137; Referee: Fredrik Klitte

27 July 2024 Round 16	IFK Göteborg	3–4	IF Brommapojkarna	Gothenburg
17:30	Svensson 2'; Muçolli 73'; Þórðarson 88'	Report	Vasić 45+2', 64'; Fritzson 52'; Svensson 75' (o.g.)	Stadium: Gamla Ullevi; Attendance: 16,268; Referee: Granit Maqedonci

4 August 2024 Round 17	Djurgårdens IF	1–1	IFK Göteborg	Stockholm
14:00	Ståhl 90+2'	Report	Santos 59'	Stadium: Tele2 Arena; Attendance: 23,418; Referee: Kristoffer Karlsson

10 August 2024 Round 18	IFK Göteborg	0–0	IFK Värnamo	Gothenburg
17:30		Report		Stadium: Gamla Ullevi; Attendance: 15,761; Referee: Adam Ladebäck

17 August 2024 Round 19	IFK Göteborg	1–1	IK Sirius	Gothenburg
15:00	Carlstrand 72'	Report	Persson 52'	Stadium: Gamla Ullevi; Attendance: 15,804; Referee: Fredrik Klitte

25 August 2024 Round 20	IF Elfsborg	3–1	IFK Göteborg	Borås
14:00	Baidoo 33'; Holten 58'; Qasem 66'	Report	Norlin 87'	Stadium: Borås Arena; Attendance: 13,533; Referee: Joakim Östling

1 September 2024 Round 21	IFK Göteborg	0–1	Hammarby IF	Gothenburg
16:30		Report	Erabi 90+11'	Stadium: Gamla Ullevi; Attendance: 17,151; Referee: Oscar Johnson

15 September 2024 Round 22	BK Häcken	3–3	IFK Göteborg	Gothenburg
16:30	Youssef 39', 90+6'; Lindberg 53'	Report	Abraham 33'; Lundqvist 41', 57'	Stadium: Bravida Arena; Attendance: 6,316; Referee: Glenn Nyberg

23 September 2024 Round 23	IFK Göteborg	1–1	Halmstads BK	Gothenburg
19:00	Lundqvist 89'	Report	Agnero 78'	Stadium: Gamla Ullevi; Attendance: 16,065; Referee: Granit Maqedonci

26 September 2024 Round 24	Västerås SK	1–1	IFK Göteborg	Västerås
19:00	Boudah 66'	Report	Norlin 21'	Stadium: Hitachi Energy Arena; Attendance: 6,252; Referee: Mohammed Al-Hakim

30 September 2024 Round 25	IFK Göteborg	2–0	GAIS	Gothenburg
19:10	Þórðarson 36'; Skjellerup 62'	Report		Stadium: Gamla Ullevi; Attendance: 18,051; Referee: Joakim Östling

6 October 2024 Round 26	IFK Norrköping	0–2	IFK Göteborg	Norrköping
16:30		Report	Svensson 33'; Skjellerup 48'	Stadium: Nya Parken; Attendance: 8,767; Referee: Fredrik Klitte

21 October 2024 Round 27	IFK Göteborg	1–2	AIK	Gothenburg
19:10	Ohlsson 88'	Report	Beširović 30'; Tiedemann Hansen 90+6'	Stadium: Gamla Ullevi; Attendance: 17,165; Referee: Oscar Johnson

28 October 2024 Round 28	Malmö FF	2–1	IFK Göteborg	Malmö
19:10 UTC+1	Ali 59'; Bolin 78'	Report	Skjellerup 25'	Stadium: Stadion; Attendance: 21,258; Referee: Glenn Nyberg

2 November 2024 Round 29	IFK Göteborg	1–1	Kalmar FF	Gothenburg
17:30 UTC+1	Þórðarson 45+1'	Report	Hallberg 78'	Stadium: Gamla Ullevi; Attendance: 17,287; Referee: Kristoffer Karlsson

10 November 2024 Round 30	Mjällby AIF	1–0	IFK Göteborg	Hällevik
15:00 UTC+1	Stroud 45+4'	Report		Stadium: Strandvallen; Attendance: 5,362; Referee: Victor Wolf

=== Svenska Cupen ===
==== 2023–24 ====
The tournament continued from the 2023 season.

Kickoff times are in UTC+1.

===== Group stage =====
Pos	Team	Pld	W	D	L	GF	GA	GD	Pts	Qualification	DIF	IFKG	SAIK	NUFC
1	Djurgårdens IF	3	3	0	0	10	0	+10	9	Advance to Knockout stage		3–0	2–0	
2	IFK Göteborg	3	2	0	1	5	6	−1	6				1–0	
3	Skövde AIK	3	1	0	2	1	3	−2	3					1–0
4	Nordic United FC	3	0	0	3	3	10	−7	0		0–5	3–4		

Source: SvFF
Rules for classification: 1) Points; 2) Goal difference; 3) Goals scored; 4) Head-to-head record; 5) Lowest disciplinary points; 6) Highest ranked team

18 February 2024 Matchday 1	Nordic United FC	3–4	IFK Göteborg	Södertälje
15:15	Fellrath 11' (pen.), 73'; Tahan 20'	Report	Muçolli 29', 90+3' (pen.); Santos 53'; Þórðarson 90+5'	Stadium: Södertälje Fotbollsarena; Attendance: 1,400; Referee: Erik Mattsson

25 February 2024 Matchday 2	IFK Göteborg	1–0	Skövde AIK	Gothenburg
13:00	Norlin 85'	Report		Stadium: Bravida Arena; Attendance: 5,074; Referee: Kristoffer Karlsson

3 March 2024 Matchday 3	Djurgårdens IF	3–0	IFK Göteborg	Stockholm
17:30	Gulliksen 76'; Hümmet 81'; Šabović 90+3'	Report		Stadium: Tele2 Arena; Attendance: 16,684; Referee: Joakim Östling

==== 2024–25 ====
The tournament continued into the 2025 season.

===== Qualification stage =====
22 August 2024 Round 2	Ariana FC	0–2	IFK Göteborg	Malmö
18:30 UTC+2		Report	Kåhed 55', 60'	Stadium: Malmö Stadion; Attendance: 1,000; Referee: Per Melin

== Non-competitive ==
=== Pre-season ===
Kickoff times are in UTC+1 unless stated otherwise.

19 January 2024 Friendly	Vendsyssel FF (Denmark)	1–0	(Sweden) IFK Göteborg	Hjørring, Denmark
15:25	Jensen 37'	Report		Stadium: Højenehallen; Attendance: 300

26 January 2024 Friendly	IFK Göteborg	0–1	Halmstads BK	Gothenburg, Sweden
18:00		Report	Mohammed 55'	Stadium: Valhalla IP; Attendance: 2,282; Referee: Fredrik Oppong

2 February 2024 The Atlantic Cup	IFK Göteborg (Sweden)	2–3	(Denmark) Silkeborg IF	Faro/Loulé, Portugal
19:30 UTC+0	Salaou 51'; Salomonsson 70'	Report	Adamsen 13', 54' (pen.); Kusk 34'	Stadium: Estádio Algarve; Attendance: 50; Referee: Flávio Duarte (Portugal)

5 February 2024 The Atlantic Cup	Mafra (Portugal)	7–1	(Sweden) IFK Göteborg	Parchal, Portugal
17:00 UTC+0	Falé 3', 38'; Matos 6', 23', 40'; Sousa 84'; Gabriel 89'	Report	Tyrén 50'	Stadium: Estádio Municipal da Bela Vista; Attendance: 50; Referee: Sérgio Jesus (Portugal)

9 February 2024 The Atlantic Cup	Brøndby IF (Denmark)	1–3	(Sweden) IFK Göteborg	Parchal, Portugal
18:00 UTC+0	Rasmussen 88'	Report	Skjellerup 3'; Muçolli 12' (pen.); Santos 16'	Stadium: Estádio Municipal da Bela Vista; Attendance: 50; Referee: Diogo Rosa (Portugal)

8 March 2024 Friendly	IFK Göteborg	2–1	Östers IF	Gothenburg, Sweden
14:30	Skjellerup 23'; Svensson 45+3'	Report	Bergmark Wiberg 6'	Stadium: Bravida Arena; Referee: Fredrik Oppong

15 March 2024 Friendly	Hammarby IF	1–3	IFK Göteborg	Stockholm, Sweden
16:00	Đukanović 66'	Report	Santos 21'; Salaou 48'; Norlin 70'	Stadium: Tele2 Arena; Attendance: 0 Referee: Farouk Nehdi

23 March 2024 Friendly	IFK Göteborg (Sweden)	0–3	(Norway) Sarpsborg 08	Gothenburg, Sweden
14:30		Report	Sandberg 14'; Berget 42'; Ørjasæter 59'	Stadium: Bravida Arena; Attendance: 1,600; Referee: Per Melin

=== Mid-season ===
Kickoff times are in UTC+2.

20 June 2024 Friendly	Lillestrøm SK (Norway)	2–0	(Sweden) IFK Göteborg	Lillestrøm, Norway
13:00	Lehne Olsen 11' (pen.); Røssing-Lelesiit 90+1'	Report		Stadium: Vigernesjordet; Attendance: 50

25 June 2024 Friendly	IFK Göteborg	1–0	IFK Norrköping	Gothenburg, Sweden
18:00	Skjellerup 5'	Report		Stadium: Ullevi; Attendance: 1,110; Referee: Magnus Lindgren

=== Post-season ===
22 November 2024 Friendly	IK Oddevold	1–2	IFK Göteborg	Uddevalla, Sweden
15:00 UTC+1	Stroud 58'	Report	Pettersson 31'; Þórðarson 73'	Stadium: Thordéngården; Attendance: 714; Referee: Philip Lindh
