= 2021 UEFA European Under-21 Championship qualification Group 3 =

Football tournament qualification stage

Group 3 of the 2021 UEFA European Under-21 Championship qualifying competition consisted of six teams: England, Austria, Turkey, Kosovo, Albania, and Andorra. The composition of the nine groups in the qualifying group stage was decided by the draw held on 11 December 2018, 09:00 CET (UTC+1), at the UEFA headquarters in Nyon, Switzerland, with the teams seeded according to their coefficient ranking.

The group was originally scheduled to be played in home-and-away round-robin format between 23 March 2019 and 13 October 2020. Under the original format, the group winners and the best runners-up among all nine groups (not counting results against the sixth-placed team) would qualify directly for the final tournament, while the remaining eight runners-up would advance to the play-offs.

On 17 March 2020, all matches were put on hold due to the COVID-19 pandemic. On 17 June 2020, UEFA announced that the qualifying group stage would be extended and end on 17 November 2020, while the play-offs, originally scheduled to be played in November 2020, would be cancelled. Instead, the group winners and the five best runners-up among all nine groups (not counting results against the sixth-placed team) would qualify for the final tournament.

== Standings ==
Pos	Team	Pld	W	D	L	GF	GA	GD	Pts	Qualification	England	Austria	Albania	Turkey	Kosovo	Andorra
1	England	10	9	1	0	34	9	+25	28	Final tournament	—	5–1	5–0	2–1	2–0	3–1
2	Austria	10	6	0	4	24	16	+8	18		1–2	—	1–5	3–0	4–0	4–0
3	Albania	10	4	2	4	16	21	−5	14		0–3	0–4	—	1–2	2–1	3–1
4	Turkey	10	4	1	5	15	18	−3	13		2–3	3–2	2–2	—	3–0	1–0
5	Kosovo	10	3	0	7	9	20	−11	9		0–6	0–1	0–1	3–1	—	1–0
6	Andorra	10	1	2	7	10	24	−14	5		3–3	1–3	2–2	2–0	0–4	—

Source: UEFA
Rules for classification: Tiebreakers

== Matches ==
Times are CET/CEST, (Note: CEST (UTC+2) for dates between 31 March and 26 October 2019 and between 29 March and 24 October 2020, and CET (UTC+1) for all other dates.) as listed by UEFA (local times, if different, are in parentheses).

23 March 2019
19:00

Albania	1–2	Turkey
Tafa 20'	Report	Yüksel 11'; Özcan 78'

Elbasan Arena, Elbasan
Attendance: 1,900
Referee: Erik Lambrechts (Belgium)

26 March 2019
18:30

Andorra	2–2	Albania
Aláez 19', 55'	Report	Imeri 53'; Sula 86'

Estadi Comunal, Andorra la Vella
Attendance: 578
Referee: Kári Jóannesarson Á Høvdanum (Faroe Islands)

6 June 2019
18:30

Andorra	0–4	Kosovo
	Report	Gashi 4' (pen.); Daku 30'; Mema 32'; Abedini 45'

Estadi Comunal, Andorra la Vella
Attendance: 207
Referee: Daniyar Sakhi (Kazakhstan)
7 June 2019
19:30 (20:30 TRT)

Turkey	2–2	Albania
Müldür 54'; Dervişoğlu 85'	Report	Maloku 49'; Bullari 90+5'

Necmi Kadıoğlu Stadium, Istanbul
Attendance: 2,100
Referee: Alain Durieux (Luxembourg)

11 June 2019
20:00

Kosovo	3–1	Turkey
Xhemajli 45+2'; Daku 72'; Kastrati 90'	Report	Dervişoğlu 46'

Fadil Vokrri Stadium, Pristina
Attendance: 2,875
Referee: Ivar Orri Kristjansson (Iceland)

5 September 2019
18:00

Andorra	1–3	Austria
Rosas 36'	Report	Meister 22', 26'; Danso 76' (pen.)

Estadi Comunal, Andorra la Vella
Attendance: 278
Referee: Alexandru Tean (Moldova)
6 September 2019
19:45 (20:45 TRT)

Turkey	2–3	England
Sinik 25'; Müldür 51'	Report	Nketiah 4', 74'; Nelson 75'

Kocaeli Stadium, İzmit
Attendance: 14,955
Referee: Luis Godinho (Portugal)

9 September 2019
16:00

Albania	0–4	Austria
	Report	Raguž 6'; Lovrić 9', 73'; Baumgartner 72'

Niko Dovana Stadium, Durrës
Attendance: 1,200
Referee: Petri Viljanen (Finland)
9 September 2019
20:45 (19:45 BST)

England	2–0	Kosovo
Foden 25', 90+3'	Report

KCOM Stadium, Kingston upon Hull
Attendance: 15,258
Referee: Kristoffer Karlsson (Sweden)

11 October 2019
20:30

Austria	3–0	Turkey
Meister 10'; Raguž 32'; Lovrić 65'	Report

Sonnenseestadion, Ritzing
Attendance: 1,076
Referee: Kirill Levnikov (Russia)

15 October 2019
19:00

Albania	2–1	Kosovo
Tafa 76'; Mucolli 81'	Report	Baftiu 90'

Elbasan Arena, Elbasan
Attendance: 845
Referee: José Luis Munuera Montero (Spain)
15 October 2019
20:45 (19:45 BST)

England	5–1	Austria
Hudson-Odoi 12', 45+1'; Nketiah 28', 39', 79'	Report	Baumgartner 66'

Stadium MK, Milton Keynes
Attendance: 11,772
Referee: Michael Fabbri (Italy)

15 November 2019
18:00

Austria	4–0	Kosovo
Raguž 14'; Friedl 20', 69'; Lovrić 74' (pen.)	Report

Keine Sorgen Arena, Ried im Innkreis
Attendance: 3015
Referee: Alan Mario Sant (Malta)
15 November 2019
19:00

Albania	0–3	England
	Report	Foden 22'; Gallagher 43'; Nelson 90+3'

Loro Boriçi Stadium, Shkodër
Attendance: 1,050
Referee: Lionel Tschudi (Switzerland)
19 November 2019
18:00

Andorra	2–0	Turkey
Cucu 7'; Aláez 86' (pen.)	Report

Estadi Nacional, Andorra la Vella
Attendance: 237
Referee: Dragan Petrovic (Bosnia and Herzegovina)

4 September 2020
18:30

Austria	1–5	Albania
Wolf 84' (pen.)	Report	Kallaku 17'; Tuci 27'; Muçi 65', 88'; Selmani 90'

Keine Sorgen Arena, Ried im Innkreis
Attendance: 0 (Note: Due to the COVID-19 pandemic in Europe, all matches scheduled for September 2020 were played behind closed doors.)
Referee: Rob Jenkins (Wales)
4 September 2020
19:00

Kosovo	0–6	England
	Report	Nketiah 52', 56', 62' (pen.); Nelson 67'; Sessegnon 83'; Bellingham 86'

Fadil Vokrri Stadium, Pristina
Attendance: 0
Referee: Mohammed Al-Hakim (Sweden)
4 September 2020
19:30 (20:30 TRT)

Turkey	1–0	Andorra
Yalçın 50'	Report

Necmi Kadıoğlu Stadium, Istanbul
Attendance: 0
Referee: Matthew De Gabriele (Malta)

8 September 2020
19:00

Albania	3–1	Andorra
Selmani 63'; Vrioni 86'; Bullari 90+5'	Report	Aláez 3' (pen.)

Elbasan Arena, Elbasan
Attendance: 0
Referee: Jasmin Sabotic (Luxembourg)
8 September 2020
20:30

Austria	1–2	England
Schmidt 61'	Report	Nketiah 28'; Godfrey 50'

Keine Sorgen Arena, Ried im Innkreis
Attendance: 0
Referee: Fran Jović (Croatia)

7 October 2020
15:00

Andorra	3–3	England
Cucu 28', 76'; García 90+1'	Report	Davies 45+1'; Dasilva 69'; Nketiah 82'

Estadi Nacional, Andorra la Vella
Attendance: 0
Referee: David Fuxman (Israel)
9 October 2020
19:00

Kosovo	0–1	Austria
	Report	Grüll 86'

Fadil Vokrri Stadium, Pristina
Attendance: 20
Referee: Laurent Kopriwa (Luxembourg)

13 October 2020
19:00

Kosovo	1–0	Andorra
Daku 62'	Report

Fadil Vokrri Stadium, Pristina
Attendance: 0
Referee: Jamie Robert Robinson (Northern Ireland)
13 October 2020 (Note: All matches originally scheduled to be played in March 2020 were postponed due to the COVID-19 pandemic in Europe. These matches were subsequently rescheduled to be played in October and November 2020.)
20:30 (19:30 BST)

England	2–1	Turkey
Türkmen 17' (o.g.); Nketiah 88'	Report	Dervişoğlu 90+2'

Molineux Stadium, Wolverhampton
Attendance: 0
Referee: Willy Delajod (France)

13 November 2020 (Note: Three matches originally scheduled to be played in September and October 2020 were rescheduled following postponements to other matches due to the COVID-19 pandemic in Europe.)
18:00 (19:00 TRT)

Turkey	3–2	Austria
Dervişoğlu 64', 81', 90+2'	Report	Arase 36'; Wolf 90'

Samsun 19 Mayis Stadyumu, Samsun
Attendance: 88
Referee: Novak Simović (Serbia)
13 November 2020
19:00

Kosovo	0–1	Albania
	Report	Çokaj 35'

Fadil Vokrri Stadium, Pristina
Attendance: 50
Referee: Nathan Verboomen (Belgium)
13 November 2020
20:30 (19:30 GMT)

England	3–1	Andorra
Jones 27'; Wilmot 49'; Hudson-Odoi 65' (pen.)	Report	García 45' (pen.)

Molineux Stadium, Wolverhampton
Attendance: 0
Referee: Sigurd Kringstad (Norway)

17 November 2020
17:00 (18:00 TRT)

Turkey	3–0	Kosovo
Dervişoğlu 21'; Yalçın 32' (pen.); Özdemir 64'	Report

Samsun 19 Mayis Stadyumu, Samsun
Attendance: 106
Referee: Aleksei Matyunin (Russia)
17 November 2020
20:25

Austria	4–0	Andorra
Wolf 4' (pen.), 31'; Grüll 11'; Wöber 90+5' (pen.)	Report

Keine Sorgen Arena, Ried im Innkreis
Attendance: 0
Referee: Manfredas Lukjancukas (Lithuania)
17 November 2020
20:25 (19:25 GMT)

England	5–0	Albania
Hudson-Odoi 5'; Justin 26'; Musiala 36'; Nketiah 52', 86'	Report

Molineux Stadium, Wolverhampton
Attendance: 0
Referee: Alain Bieri (Switzerland)

== Goalscorers ==
There were 108 goals scored in 30 matches, for an average of 3.6 goals per match.

13 goals

- (England) Eddie Nketiah

7 goals

- (Turkey) Halil Dervişoğlu

4 goals

- (Andorra) Jordi Aláez
- (Austria) Hannes Wolf
- (Austria) Sandi Lovrić
- (England) Callum Hudson-Odoi

3 goals

- (Andorra) Cucu
- (Austria) Nicolas Meister
- (Austria) Marko Raguž
- (England) Phil Foden
- (England) Reiss Nelson
- (Kosovo) Mirlind Daku

2 goals

- (Albania) Emiliano Bullari
- (Albania) Ernest Muçi
- (Albania) Adolf Selmani
- (Albania) Shaqir Tafa
- (Andorra) Christian García
- (Austria) Christoph Baumgartner
- (Austria) Marco Friedl
- (Austria) Marco Grüll
- (Turkey) Mert Müldür
- (Turkey) Güven Yalçın

1 goal

- (Albania) Enis Çokaj
- (Albania) Omar Imeri
- (Albania) Sherif Kallaku
- (Albania) Leonardo Maloku
- (Albania) Arbnor Mucolli
- (Albania) Din Sula
- (Albania) Indrit Tuci
- (Albania) Giacomo Vrioni
- (Andorra) Albert Rosas
- (Austria) Kelvin Arase
- (Austria) Kevin Danso
- (Austria) Patrick Schmidt
- (Austria) Maximilian Wöber
- (England) Jude Bellingham
- (England) Josh Dasilva
- (England) Tom Davies
- (England) Conor Gallagher
- (England) Ben Godfrey
- (England) Curtis Jones
- (England) James Justin
- (England) Jamal Musiala
- (England) Ryan Sessegnon
- (England) Ben Wilmot
- (Kosovo) Eris Abedini
- (Kosovo) Blendi Baftiu
- (Kosovo) Ardit Gashi
- (Kosovo) Lirim Kastrati
- (Kosovo) Lirim Mema
- (Kosovo) Arbenit Xhemajli
- (Turkey) Berkay Özcan
- (Turkey) Doğukan Sinik
- (Turkey) İlker Yüksel
- (Turkey) Berat Özdemir

1 own goal

- (Turkey) Hüseyin Türkmen (against England)
