= The Atlantic Cup (football) =

Annual football tournament in Algarve, Portugal

- Founded: 2011
- Region: Europe (UEFA)
- Teams: 4–11
- Current champions: (United States) FC Dallas (1st title)
- Most championships: (Denmark) AGF (Denmark) Brøndby (Russia) Zenit Saint Petersburg (2 titles each)
- Website: theatlanticcup.co.uk

The Atlantic Cup is a pre/mid-season football tournament held in Algarve, Portugal for European football clubs from national leagues which do not operate in the winter months. It therefore consists mainly of teams from Scandinavia, Northern and Central Europe.

It was founded in 2011 by former Arsenal, Benfica and Sweden midfielder, Stefan Schwarz and ex-Millwall goalkeeper Brian Horne.

Television coverage was originally provided by Eurosport and Eurosport 2.

== Winners ==
Year	Winner	Runner-up
2011	(Sweden) Elfsborg	(Denmark) Odense
2012	(Denmark) Midtjylland	(Croatia) Dinamo Zagreb
2013	(Austria) Rapid Wien	(Denmark) Silkeborg
2014	(Denmark) Copenhagen	(Sweden) Örebro
2015	(Russia) Dynamo Moscow	(Sweden) Örebro
2016	(Russia) Zenit Saint Petersburg	(Sweden) Örebro
2017	(Croatia) Rijeka	(Czech Republic) Jablonec
2018	(Denmark) AGF	(Czech Republic) Jablonec
2019	(Austria) Red Bull Salzburg	(Czech Republic) Jablonec
2020	(Denmark) AGF	(Denmark) Copenhagen
2022	(Russia) Zenit Saint Petersburg	(Denmark) Copenhagen
2023	(Denmark) Brøndby	(Denmark) Copenhagen
2024	(Denmark) Silkeborg	(United States) Real Salt Lake
2025	(Denmark) Brøndby	(Sweden) Värnamo
2026	(United States) FC Dallas	(Sweden) Göteburg

== Editions ==
=== 2011 edition ===
This was the first edition of The Atlantic Cup, contested by two Danish and two Swedish teams. IF Elfsborg won the competition.

Pos	Team	Pld	W	D	L	GF	GA	GD	Pts
1	(Sweden) IF Elfsborg	3	2	1	0	6	3	+3	7
2	(Denmark) Odense BK	3	1	2	0	5	4	+1	5
3	(Sweden) Helsingborgs IF	3	1	1	1	4	4	0	4
4	(Denmark) Brøndby IF	3	0	0	3	3	7	−4	0

	ELF	ODE	HEL	BRO
IF Elfsborg (Sweden)	–	1–1	3–1	2–1
Odense BK (Denmark)	–	–	–	–
Helsingborgs IF (Sweden)	–	1–1	–	–
Brøndby IF (Denmark)	–	2–3	0–2	–

=== 2012 edition ===
This was the second edition, contested by six teams from five countries. FC Midtjylland won the competition beating Dinamo Zagreb 1–0 in the final.

Pos	Team	Pld	W	D	L	GF	GA	GD	Pts
1	(Croatia) Dinamo Zagreb	3	2	1	0	5	2	+3	7
2	(Denmark) FC Midtjylland	3	2	1	0	6	4	+2	7
3	(Poland) Wisla Krakow	3	2	0	1	5	3	+2	6
4	(Denmark) Odense BK	3	1	0	2	3	5	−2	3
5	(Austria) Rapid Wien	3	0	1	2	3	5	−2	1
6	(Sweden) Helsingborgs IF	3	0	1	2	1	4	−3	1

	DIN	MID	WIS	ODE	RAP	HEL
Dinamo Zagreb (Croatia)	–	1–1	–	3–1	–	–
FC Midtjylland (Denmark)	–	–	3–2	–	–	–
Wisla Krakow (Poland)	–	–	–	1–0	–	–
Odense BK (Denmark)	–	–	–	–	–	–
Rapid Wien (Austria)	–	1–2	–	1–2	–	–
Helsingborgs IF (Sweden)	0–1	–	0–2	–	1–1	–

==== Final ====
7 February 2012
17:30

Dinamo Zagreb (Croatia)	0–1	(Denmark) FC Midtjylland

Estádio Algarve, Faro

=== 2013 edition ===
This was the third edition, contested by three teams. S.C. Farense and SV Mattersburg also played but theirs matches were not taken account to the final standings. Rapid Wien won the competition.

Pos	Team	Pld	W	D	L	GF	GA	GD	Pts
1	(Austria) Rapid Wien	2	2	0	0	3	1	+2	6
2	(Denmark) Silkeborg IF	2	1	0	1	5	4	+1	3
3	(Albania) Skënderbeu Korçë	2	0	0	2	2	5	−3	0

	RAP	SIL	SKE	FAR	MAT
Rapid Wien (Austria)	–	2–1	1–0	–	–
Silkeborg IF (Denmark)	–	–	–	–	–
KF Skënderbeu Korçë (Albania)	–	2–4	–	–	0–4
S.C. Farense (Portugal)	0–0	–	–	–	–
SV Mattersburg (Austria)	–	1–1	–	–	–

=== 2014 edition ===
This was the fourth edition of, contested by 8 teams from 6 countries. Television coverage was provided by Eurosport and Eurosport 2. The Danish team Copenhagen won the tournament, finishing the competition only with victories and without conceding a goal. The Swedish team Örebro SK finished in second place, also with victories only, but with a lower goal-difference than Copenhagen.

==== Participating teams ====
- Copenhagen
- FC Midtjylland
- FC Slovan Liberec
- FC Spartak Moscow
- Örebro SK
- FH
- Breiðablik
- SV Mattersburg

==== Standings ====
Pos	Team	Pld	W	D	L	GF	GA	GD	Pts
1	(Denmark) Copenhagen	3	3	0	0	11	0	+11	9
2	(Sweden) Örebro SK	3	3	0	0	8	2	+6	9
3	(Russia) FC Spartak Moscow	3	2	0	1	5	7	−2	6
4	(Iceland) Breiðablik UBK	3	1	1	1	3	4	−1	5
5	(Austria) SV Mattersburg	3	1	1	1	6	5	+1	4
6	(Czech Republic) FC Slovan Liberec	3	1	0	2	2	7	−5	3
7	(Denmark) FC Midtjylland	3	0	0	3	3	6	−3	0
8	(Iceland) FH Hafnarfjarðar	3	0	0	3	4	11	−7	0

==== Matches ====
4 February 2014	Breiðablik UBK	1–1 (4–3 p)	SV Mattersburg	Estádio Albufeira, Albufeira
19:45 (GMT)	Lýðsson 23' (pen.)		Höller 49'
	Penalties
	Gíslason (penalty scored); Halsman (penalty scored); Muminovic (penalty scored); Eyjólfsson (penalty scored)		Malić (penalty scored); Klemen (penalty scored); Prietl (penalty scored)

5 February 2014	Örebro SK	4–1	FH Hafnarfjarðar	Estádio Algarve, Faro
16:00 (GMT)	A. Yasin 20'; Shpëtim Hasani 29'; Samuel Mensah 82'; A. Kamara 85' (pen.)		Davíð Þór Viðarsson 44'

5 February 2014	FC Slovan Liberec	2–1	FC Midtjylland	Estádio Algarve, Faro
19:45 (GMT)	Yevhen Budnik 34'; Kevin Luckassen 59'		André Rømer 74'

7 February 2014	Breiðablik UBK	2–1	FC Midtjylland	Estádio da Nora, Albufeira
16:00 (GMT)	Árni Vilhjálmsson 50'; Elfar Árni Aðalsteinsson 59'		Paul Onuachu 52'

7 February 2014	Copenhagen	4–0	FC Slovan Liberec	Estádio Algarve, Faro
19:45 (GMT)	Andreas Cornelius 31', 39', 66'; Y. Felfel 86'

8 February 2014	Örebro SK	2–1	SV Mattersburg	Estádio da Nora, Albufeira
16:00 (GMT)	Karl Holmberg 5'; Emil Berger 81'	Goals	Alexander Taschner 13'

9 February 2014	FH Hafnarfjarðar	1–3	FC Spartak Moscow	Estádio Albufeira, Albufeira
19:45 (GMT)	Atli Guðnason 10'		Vladimir Obukhov 27'; Denis Davydov 28'; Lucas Barrios 87'

10 February 2014	FC Slovan Liberec	0–2	Örebro SK	Estádio Albufeira, Albufeira
16:00 (GMT)			Daniel Gustavsson 12'; Erik Moberg 24'

10 February 2014	Copenhagen	2–0	Breiðablik UBK	Estádio Algarve, Faro
19:45 (GMT)	Daniel Braaten 10'; Danny Amankwaa 50'

11 February 2014	SV Mattersburg	4–2	FH Hafnarfjarðar	Estádio da Nora, Albufeira
16:00 (GMT)	Ingo Klemen 7', 28', 46'; Markus Pink 79'		A. Björnsson 34'; I.N. Óskarsson 35'

11 February 2014	FC Midtjylland	1–2	FC Spartak Moscow	Estádio Algarve, Faro
19:45 (GMT)	Patrick Banggaard 15'		Lucas Barrios 48', 72'

13 February 2014	FC Spartak Moscow	0–5	Copenhagen	Estádio Algarve, Faro
16:00 (GMT)			Rúrik Gíslason 15'; Igor Vetokele 16'; Pierre Bengtsson 20'; Artyom Timofeyev 33' (o.g.); Christoffer Remmer 82'

=== 2015 edition ===
==== Group A ====
Pos	Team	Pld	W	D	L	GF	GA	GD	Pts
1	(Russia) FC Dynamo Moscow	2	2	0	0	4	1	+3	6
2	(Sweden) IFK Göteborg	2	1	0	1	3	3	+0	3
3	(Czech Republic) Baumit Jablonec	2	1	0	1	3	3	+0	3
4	(Denmark) Copenhagen	2	0	0	2	1	4	−3	0

30 January 2015	FC Dynamo Moscow	2–1	Copenhagen	Estádio Algarve, Faro
22:00	Valbuena 40'; Yusupov 77'	report	Delaney 30'

1 February 2015	IFK Göteborg	3–1	Baumit Jablonec	Estádio Algarve, Faro
16:30	Vibe 9' 35'; Boman 11'	Report	Kopic 58'

4 February 2015	FC Dynamo Moscow	2–0	IFK Göteborg	Estádio Algarve, Faro
16:30	Büttner 54'; Kuranyi 90'	Report

4 February 2015	Baumit Jablonec	2–0	Copenhagen	Estádio Algarve, Faro
20:00	Crnkič 45'; Šabala 58'	Report

==== Group B ====
Pos	Team	Pld	W	W–	D	L+	L	GF	GA	GD	Pts
1	(Sweden) Örebro SK	2	1	1	0	0	0	3	2	+1	5
2	(Denmark) Brøndby IF	2	1	0	0	0	1	2	1	+1	3
3	(Czech Republic) Mladá Boleslav	2	1	0	0	0	1	1	2	−1	3
4	(Denmark) FC Midtjylland	2	0	0	0	1	1	1	2	−1	1

31 January 2015	FC Midtjylland	1–1 (3–4 p)	Örebro SK	Estádio da Nora, Albufeira
14:00	Rasmussen 9'	Report	Gustavsson 88'
	Penalties
	Sisto (penalty scored); Lauridsen (penalty missed); Andersson (penalty missed); Poulsen (penalty scored); Bak Nielsen (penalty missed); J. Larsen (penalty missed)		(penalty scored) Wiktorsson; (penalty missed) Moberg; (penalty missed) Gustavsson; (penalty missed) Haginge; (penalty scored) Kamara; (penalty scored) Åhman Persson

31 January 2015	Brøndby IF	2–0	Mladá Boleslav	Estádio Algarve, Faro
20:00	Dumić 54'; Elmander 55'	Report

3 February 2015	Örebro SK	2–1	Brøndby IF	Estádio da Nora, Albufeira
15:00	Sebastian Ring 13'; Holmberg 58'	Report	Friðjónsson 20'

3 February 2015	Mladá Boleslav	1–0	FC Midtjylland	Estádio Algarve, Faro
20:00	Vacek 24'	Report

==== Finals ====
7 February 2015	Copenhagen	4–2	Mladá Boleslav	Estádio Municipal de Albufeira, Albufeira
11:00	Augustinsson 8'; Toutouh 31'; Amankwaa 34'; Cornelius 44'	Report	Magera 6'; Skalák 67'

7 February 2015	Baumit Jablonec	1–1	FC Midtjylland	Estádio Algarve, Faro
17:30

7 February 2015	IFK Göteborg	0–1	Brøndby IF	Estádio Municipal de Albufeira, Albufeira
21:00

==== Tournament Final ====
7 February 2015	Örebro SK	0–1	FC Dynamo Moscow	Estádio Algarve, Faro
14:30		Report	Dzsudzsák 75'

=== 2016 edition ===
The 2016 edition had the same format as the 2015 Atlantic Cup. The winner of Group A (FK Jablonec) did not contest the final due to the schedule of its flight back home. They were replaced in the final by Group A runner-up, Örebro SK. FC Zenit Saint Petersburg won the competition after a penalty-shootout.

==== Group A ====
Pos	Team	Pld	W	W–	L+	L	GF	GA	GD	Pts
1	(Czech Republic) Jablonec	2	2	0	0	0	4	1	+3	6
2	(Sweden) Örebro SK	2	1	0	0	1	1	1	+0	3
3	(Denmark) AGF	2	1	0	0	1	1	2	−1	3
4	(Sweden) Kalmar FF	2	0	0	0	2	1	3	−2	0

	JAB	ORE	AAR	KAL
Jablonec	–	–	–	2–1
Örebro	–	–	0–1	–
AGF	0–2	–	–	–
Kalmar	–	0–1	–	–

==== Group B ====
Pos	Team	Pld	W	W–	L+	L	GF	GA	GD	Pts
1	(Russia) Zenit Saint Petersburg	2	2	0	0	0	5	2	+3	6
2	(Russia) Lokomotiv Moscow	2	0	1	1	0	1	1	+0	3
3	(Sweden) IFK Norrköping	2	0	1	0	1	3	4	−1	2
4	(Denmark) Brøndby IF	2	0	0	1	1	0	2	−2	1

	ZEN	LOK	NOR	BRO
Zenit Saint Petersburg	–	–	–	2–0
Lokomotiv Moscow	–	–	1–1 (4–6 p)	–
Norrköping	2–3	–	–	–
Brøndby	–	0–0 (2–3 p)	–	–

==== Finals ====
7th	Kalmar (Sweden)	1–2	(Denmark) Brøndby
5th	Jablonec (Czech Republic)	3–2	(Sweden) Norrköping
3rd	AGF (Denmark)	2–1	(Russia) Lokomotiv Moscow
1st	Örebro (Sweden)	1–1 (4–5 p)	(Russia) Zenit Saint Petersburg

=== 2017 edition ===
The 2017 edition was disputed in the same format as 2016 Atlantic Cup was.

==== Group A ====
Pos	Team	Pld	W	W–	L+	L	GF	GA	GD	Pts
1	(Czech Republic) Jablonec	2	1	1	0	0	4	2	+2	5
2	(Ukraine) Shakhtar Donetsk	2	1	0	1	0	5	2	+3	4
3	(Sweden) Örebro	2	1	0	0	1	1	2	−1	3
4	(Denmark) AaB	2	0	0	0	2	0	4	−4	0

	JAB	SHA	ÖRE	AAB
Jablonec	–	–	2–0	–
Shakhtar Donetsk	2–2 (4–5 p)	–	–	–
Örebro	–	–	–	1–0
AaB	–	0–3	–	–

==== Group B ====
Pos	Team	Pld	W	W–	L+	L	GF	GA	GD	Pts
1	(Croatia) Rijeka	2	2	0	0	0	4	0	+4	6
2	(Hungary) Debrecen	2	1	0	0	1	2	1	+1	3
3	(Sweden) Djurgårdens IF	2	1	0	0	1	1	1	0	3
4	(Denmark) AGF	2	0	0	0	2	0	5	−5	0

	RIJ	DEB	DJU	AGF
Rijeka	–	–	–	3–0
Debrecen	–	–	0–1	–
Djurgårdens IF	0–1	–	–	–
AGF	–	0–2	–	–

==== Finals ====
7th	AaB Aalborg (Denmark)	0–0 (1–4 p)	(Sweden) Djurgården
5th	AGF (Denmark)	1–1	(Sweden) Örebro
3rd	Shakhtar (Ukraine)	2–1	(Hungary) Debrecen
1st	Rijeka (Croatia)	3–0	(Czech Republic) Jablonec

=== 2018 edition ===
The 2018 edition was disputed in the same format as 2017 Atlantic Cup.

==== Group A ====
Pos	Team	Pld	W	W–	L+	L	GF	GA	GD	Pts
1	(Denmark) AGF	2	2	0	0	0	4	1	+3	6
2	(Sweden) Norrköping	2	0	1	1	0	2	2	0	3
3	(Croatia) Rijeka	2	0	1	0	1	2	3	−1	2
4	(China) Beijing Sinobo Guoan	2	0	0	1	1	1	3	−2	1

29 January 2018	AGF (Denmark)	2–1	(Croatia) Rijeka	Estádio Algarve, Algarve
16:00 GMT	Sana 45+1' (pen.); Pedersen 55'		Ristovski 73'

29 January 2018	Norrköping (Sweden)	1–1 (4–2 p)	(China) Beijing Sinobo Guoan	Estádio Algarve, Algarve
20:00 GMT	Larsson 27'		Bakambu 25'	Referee: Fábio Piló (Portugal)
	Penalties
	Holmberg (penalty scored); Gerson (penalty scored); Wahlqvist (penalty scored); Jakobsen (penalty scored)		(penalty missed) Liu Guobo; (penalty scored) Zhang Yu; (penalty scored) Wang Ziming; (penalty missed) Zhu Chaoqing

2 February 2018	Rijeka (Croatia)	1–1 (5–3 p)	(Sweden) Norrköping	Estádio Bela Vista, Parchal
16:00 GMT	Gerson 69' (o.g.)		Jakobsen 3'
	Penalties
	Puljić (penalty scored); Dangubić (penalty scored); Zuta (penalty scored); Ristovski (penalty scored); Escoval (penalty scored)		(penalty scored) Gerson; (penalty missed) Larsson; (penalty scored) Jakobsen; (penalty missed) Karlsson

2 February 2018	Beijing Sinobo Guoan (China)	0–2	(Denmark) AGF	Estádio Bela Vista, Parchal
20:00 GMT			Pušić 77'; Bundu 86'	Referee: André Narciso (Portugal)

==== Group B ====
Pos	Team	Pld	W	W–	L+	L	GF	GA	GD	Pts
1	(Czech Republic) Jablonec	2	1	1	0	0	3	2	+1	5
2	(Republic of Ireland) Shamrock Rovers	2	0	2	0	0	0	0	0	4
3	(Sweden) Dalkurd	2	0	0	2	0	1	1	0	2
4	(Sweden) Hammarby	2	0	0	1	1	1	2	−1	1

30 January 2018	Jablonec (Czech Republic)	2–1	(Sweden) Hammarby	Estádio Bela Vista, Parchal
16:00 GMT	Chramosta 1', 3'		Bengtsson 65'

30 January 2018	Shamrock Rovers (Republic of Ireland)	0–0 (6–5 p)	(Sweden) Dalkurd	Estádio Bela Vista, Parchal
20:00 GMT
	Penalties
	Gary Shaw (penalty scored) (penalty missed) (penalty missed) (penalty scored) (penalty scored) (penalty scored); Boyle (penalty scored); Dan Cleary (penalty scored)		(penalty scored) Amin; (penalty scored) Stadler; (penalty missed) Miljević; (penalty scored) Awad; (penalty missed) Moënza; (penalty scored) Ranđelović; (penalty scored) Rashidi; (penalty missed) DeJohn

3 February 2018	Dalkurd (Sweden)	1–1 (4–5 p)	(Czech Republic) Jablonec	Estádio Algarve, Algarve
16:00 GMT	Bnou Marzouk 7'		Piroch 60'

3 February 2018	Hammarby (Sweden)	0–0 (2–4 p)	(Republic of Ireland) Shamrock Rovers	Estádio Algarve, Algarve
20:00 GMT

==== Finals ====
Due to Rijeka's domestic schedule commitments, they departed Portugal early and were replaced by Stade Nyonnais, an invited team. As per tournament rules and regulations, they played in the 7th/8th place play-off match.

6 February 2018 7th/8th place play-off	Stade Nyonnais (Switzerland)	1–2	(Sweden) Hammarby	Estádio da Nora, Albufeira
16:00 GMT

5 February 2018 5th/6th place play-off	Beijing Sinobo Guoan (China)	1–3	(Sweden) Dalkurd	Estádio Bela Vista, Parchal
14:00 GMT	Soriano 11' (pen.)		Berg 7'; DeJohn 26'; Bnou-Marzouk 32'	Referee: André Narciso (Portugal)

6 February 2018 3rd/4th place play-off	Norrköping (Sweden)	1–1 (4-1 p)	(Republic of Ireland) Shamrock Rovers	Estádio da Nora, Albufeira
12:00 GMT	Kalle Holmberg	Report	Seán Boyd
	Penalties
	(penalty scored) Daniel Sjolund; (penalty scored) Alexander Jakobsen; (penalty scored) Jordan Larsson; (penalty scored) Felix Bengtsson		(penalty missed) Sam Bone; (penalty scored) Aaron Bolger; (penalty scored) Dean Dillon

5 February 2018 Tournament Final	AGF (Denmark)	1–1 (5–4 p)	(Czech Republic) Jablonec	Estádio Algarve, Algarve
20:00 GMT

=== 2019 edition ===
Nine teams from 7 countries participated in the 2019 edition.

Pos	Team	Pld	W	W–	L+	L	GF	GA	GD	Pts
1	(Austria) Red Bull Salzburg	2	2	0	0	0	3	0	+3	6
2	(Czech Republic) Jablonec	2	1	1	0	0	2	1	+1	5
3	(Sweden) Norrköping	2	1	0	1	0	5	2	+3	4
4	(Czech Republic) Slavia Prague	2	1	0	0	1	2	1	+1	3
5	(Denmark) AGF	2	1	0	0	1	3	3	+0	3
6	(Portugal) Farense	2	0	1	1	0	2	2	+0	3
7	(China) Beijing Sinobo Guoan	2	0	1	0	1	1	3	−2	2
8	(Austria) SV Mattersburg	2	0	0	1	1	2	5	−3	1
9	(Norway) Rosenborg	2	0	0	0	2	2	5	−3	0

25 January 2019	Farense (Portugal)	1–1 (5–6 p)	(Czech Republic) Jablonec	Estádio da Nora, Albufeira
16:00 GMT	Alan Júnior 77' (pen.)		Kratochvíl 33'
	Penalties
	D. Moura (penalty scored); P. Kadri (penalty scored); Alan Júnior (penalty missed); Pedro Simões (penalty scored); Jorge Ribeiro (penalty scored); Fábio Nunes (penalty scored); Delmiro (penalty missed)		Kubista (penalty scored); Sobol (penalty scored); Považanec (penalty missed); Fábry (penalty scored); Ikaunieks (penalty scored); Hovorka (penalty scored); Břečka (penalty scored)

27 January 2019	Slavia Prague (Czech Republic)	0–1	(Austria) Red Bull Salzburg	Estádio Municipal de Albufeira, Albufeira
16:00 GMT			Daka 65'

28 January 2019	Jablonec (Czech Republic)	1–0	(Denmark) AGF	Estádio Municipal de Albufeira, Albufeira
19:00 GMT	Vătăjelu 53'

30 January 2019	Beijing Sinobo Guoan (China)	1–1 (3–1 p)	(Austria) SV Mattersburg	Estádio Municipal de Albufeira, Albufeira
15:00 GMT

1 February 2019	Red Bull Salzburg (Austria)	2–0	(China) Beijing Sinobo Guoan	Estádio Algarve, Algarve
13:00 GMT

1 February 2019	Rosenborg (Norway)	0–2	(Czech Republic) Slavia Prague	Estádio Algarve, Algarve
20:00 GMT			Stoch 3'; Olayinka 49'	Attendance: 200

4 February 2019	SV Mattersburg (Austria)	1–4	(Sweden) Norrköping	Estádio da Nora, Albufeira
12:00 GMT

4 February 2019	AGF (Denmark)	3–2	(Norway) Rosenborg	Estádio Algarve, Algarve
20:00 GMT	Sana 8'; Toutouh 52'; Mikanović 78'		Søderlund 19'; Hovland 87'	Attendance: 50

6 February 2019	Norrköping (Sweden)	1–1 (1–3 p)	(Portugal) Farense	Estádio da Nora, Albufeira
16:00 GMT

=== 2020 edition ===
The 2020 edition returned to the two-group format, last seen in 2018.

==== Group A ====
Pos	Team	Pld	W	D	L	GF	GA	GD	Pts
1	(Denmark) Copenhagen	2	1	1	0	1	0	1	4
2	(Denmark) Brøndby IF	2	1	0	1	3	2	1	3
3	(Kazakhstan) FC Astana	2	1	0	1	3	2	1	3
4	(Sweden) Norrköping	2	0	1	1	0	2	−2	2

31 January 2020	(Denmark) Brøndby IF	2–0	(Sweden) Norrköping	Estádio Algarve
16:00 GMT	Gammelby 34'; Hedlund 66'	Report		Referee: Marcos Brazao

31 January 2020	Copenhagen	1–0	FC Astana	Estádio Algarve
20:00 GMT	Santos 3'	Report		Attendance: Carlos Cabral

3 February 2020	(Sweden) Norrköping	0–0	(Denmark) Copenhagen	Estádio Municipal de Albufeira
16:00 GMT		Report		Referee: Joao Bernardo

3 February 2020	(Kazakhstan) FC Astana	2–1	(Denmark) Brøndby IF	Estádio Municipal de Albufeira
20:00 GMT	Tomasov 29', 45'	Report	Uhre 45'	Referee: Bruno Vieira

==== Group B ====
Pos	Team	Pld	W	D	L	GF	GA	GD	Pts
1	(Denmark) AGF	2	1	1	0	5	3	2	5
2	(Czech Republic) SK Slavia Praha	2	1	1	0	6	4	2	4
3	(Norway) Vålerenga IF	2	1	0	1	3	4	−1	3
4	(Sweden) BK Häcken	2	0	0	2	1	4	−3	0

1 February 2020	(Denmark) AGF	3–3 (4–3 p)	(Czech Republic) SK Slavia Praha	Estádio Municipal De Albufeira, Albufeira
13:00 GMT	Ankersen 4' Mortensen 33' Ankersen 49'		Musa 48' Musa 54' Provod 60'	Referee: José Salema
	Penalties
	Helenius (penalty scored); Gersbach (penalty scored); Grønbæk (penalty scored); Juelsgård (penalty scored)		Hellebrand (penalty missed); Musa (penalty scored); Boril (penalty scored); Cerv (penalty missed)

2 February 2020	(Sweden) BK Häcken	1–2	(Norway) Vålerenga IF	Estádio da Nora, Albufeira
20:00 GMT				Referee: Paulo Barradas

4 February 2020	(Sweden) BK Häcken	0–2	(Denmark) AGF	Estádio Algarve, Algarve
16:00 GMT			Links 18'; Helenius 21'	Referee: Flavio Lima

4 February 2020	(Norway) Vålerenga	1–3	(Czech Republic) SK Slavia Praha	Estádio Algarve, Algarve
20:00 GMT				Referee: André Pereira

==== Finals ====
7 February 2020	(Denmark) Brøndby IF	2–0	(Czech Republic) SK Slavia Praha	Estádio da Nora, Albufeira
10:00 GMT

8 February 2020	(Kazakhstan) FC Astana	1–2	(Sweden) BK Häcken	TBC
15:00 GMT

7 February 2020	(Sweden) Norrköping	1–2	(Norway) Vålerenga	Estádio da Nora, Albufeira
20:00 GMT

7 February 2020 Tournament Final	(Denmark) Copenhagen	0–1	(Denmark) AGF	Estádio Algarve
15:00 GMT

=== 2022 edition ===
The 2022 tournament was originally intended to follow the two-group format. However, AIK Stockholm was forced to withdraw due to COVID, forcing a format change and welcoming Copenhagen into the tournament.

Pos	Team	Pld	W	D	L	GF	GA	GD	Pts
1	(Russia) FC Zenit	3	2	1	0	4	2	2	8
2	(Denmark) Copenhagen	3	2	1	0	7	5	2	7
3	(Sweden) Halmstads BK	3	2	0	1	5	4	1	6
4	(Iceland) Breiðablik UBK	3	1	1	1	8	8	0	5
5	(Denmark) FC Midtjylland	3	1	1	1	6	5	1	4
6	(Denmark) Brøndby IF	3	1	0	2	3	4	-1	3
7	(England) Brentford B	3	1	0	2	3	4	-1	3
8	(Norway) Vålerenga IF	3	0	0	3	3	7	-4	0

3 February 2022	FC Zenit (Russia)	1–0	(Denmark) FC Midtjylland	Estádio Algarve
15:00 GMT	Alip 40'	Report

3 February 2022	Breiðablik UBK (Iceland)	2–1	(England) Brentford B	Estádio Algarve
19:30 GMT		Report

4 February 2022	Brøndby IF (Denmark)	2–1	(Norway) Vålerenga IF	Estádio Municipal Bela Vista
15:00 GMT		Report

5 February 2022	Halmstads BK (Sweden)	1–2	(Denmark) Copenhagen	Estádio Municipal de Albufeira
15:00 GMT		Report

6 February 2022	FC Midtjylland (Denmark)	3–3 (4–5 p)	(Iceland) Breiðablik UBK	Estádio Municipal de Albufeira
19:30 GMT		Report

8 February 2022	Brentford B (England)	1–0	(Denmark) Brøndby IF	Estádio Algarve
15:00 GMT		Report

8 February 2022	Vålerenga IF (Norway)	1–2	(Sweden) Halmstads BK	Estádio Algarve
19:30 GMT		Report

10 February 2022	Copenhagen (Denmark)	1–1 (2–3 p)	(Russia) FC Zenit	Estádio Algarve
15:00 GMT

11 February 2022	Halmstads BK (Sweden)	2–1	(England) Brentford B	Estádio Municipal de Albufeira
11:00 GMT		Report

11 February 2022	Brøndby IF (Denmark)	1–2	(Russia) FC Zenit	Estádio Algarve
13:00 GMT		Report

11 February 2022	Breiðablik UBK (Iceland)	3–4	(Denmark) Copenhagen	Estádio Municipal de Albufeira
16:00 GMT		Report

11 February 2022	FC Midtjylland (Denmark)	3–1	(Norway) Vålerenga IF	Estádio Municipal de Albufeira
18:30 GMT		Report

=== 2023 edition ===
The 2023 tournament was held 2–10 February 2023 with 10 teams competing.

Pos	Team	Pld	W	D	L	GF	GA	GD	Pts
1	(Denmark) Brøndby	3	3	0	0	7	3	+4	9
2	(Denmark) Copenhagen	3	2	1	0	6	2	+4	7
3	(Norway) Viking Stavanger	3	1	1	1	4	3	+1	5
4	(Denmark) Midtjylland	2	1	1	0	1	1	+1	5
5	(England) Brentford B	3	1	1	1	2	2	0	4
6	(Sweden) Elfsborg	3	1	1	1	6	5	-1	4
7	(Denmark) Lyngby	2	1	0	1	6	4	+2	3
8	(South Korea) Ulsan Hyundai	3	1	0	2	1	4	-3	3
9	(Sweden) AIK	3	0	1	2	3	5	-2	2
10	(Sweden) Halmstad	3	0	0	3	0	5	-5	0

2 February 2023	Ulsan Hyundai (South Korea)	1–0	(England) Brentford B	Estadio Municipal Bela Vista
19:00 GMT	Yun Il-lok 87' (Lee Myung-jae)	Report

3 February 2023	Halmstad (Sweden)	0–2	(Norway) Viking Stavanger	Municipal de Albufeira
17:00 GMT		Report	Sandberg 4'; Svendsen 89'

3 February 2023	Brøndby (Denmark)	2–1	(Sweden) AIK	Estadio Algarve
19:00 GMT	Wass 67' (pen.); Hedlund 81'	Report	Björnström 48'

4 February 2023	Copenhagen (Denmark)	4–1	(Sweden) Elfsborg	Estadio Algarve
17:00 GMT	Cornelius 41' (Sørensen); Gonçalves 61' 73' (pen.); Haraldsson 79' (Diks)	Report	Okkels 52'	Referee: Pedro Ramalho (Portugal)

=== 2024 edition ===
The 2024 tournament was held from 30 January–10 February 2024 with 11 teams competing.

Pos	Team	Pld	W	D	L	GF	GA	GD	Pts
1	(Denmark) Silkeborg	3	3	0	0	8	3	+5	9
2	(United States) Real Salt Lake	3	2	0	1	5	2	+3	6
3	(Norway) Fredrikstad	3	2	0	1	4	1	+3	6
4	(Denmark) Copenhagen	3	2	0	1	9	7	+2	6
5	(Denmark) Brøndby	3	2	0	1	5	5	0	6
6	(China) Beijing Guoan	1	1	0	0	1	0	+1	3
7	(Norway) Molde	2	1	0	1	3	4	-1	3
8	(Sweden) Göteborg	3	1	0	2	6	10	-5	3
9	(Denmark) Midtjylland	2	0	0	2	1	3	-2	0
10	(Sweden) Elfsborg	3	0	0	2	5	10	-5	0
11	(Faroe Islands) Klaksvík	3	0	0	3	0	7	-7	0

31 January 2024	Fredrikstad (Norway)	3–0	(Sweden) Elfsborg	Estádio da Nora
14:30 GMT	Hendriksson 17', 34'; Traoré 45+1'	Report

31 January 2024	Klaksvík (Faroe Islands)	0–1	(China) Beijing Guoan	Pine Cliffs
14:30 GMT		Report

2 February 2024	Molde (Norway)	2–1	(Denmark) Midtjylland	Estádio da Nora
14:30 GMT	Gulbrandsen 3'; Berisha 83'	Report	Mads Bech 73'

2 February 2024	Göteborg (Sweden)	2–3	(Denmark) Silkeborg	Estádio Algarve
19:30 GMT	Salaou 52'; Salomonsson 71'	Report	Adamsen 10', 54'; Kusk 32'

3 February 2024	Brøndby (Denmark)	2–1	(United States) Real Salt Lake	Estádio Algarve
16:00 GMT	Vallys 35'; Suzuki 41'	Report	Julio 16'

4 February 2024	Elfsborg (Sweden)	4–5	(Denmark) Copenhagen	Estádio Algarve
19:00 GMT	Michael Baidoo 30', 51'; Johan Larsson 54'; Jalal Abdullai 85'	Report	Diogo Gonçalves 3'; Mohamed Elyounoussi 20', 36'; Viktor Claesson 48', 90+3'

5 February 2024	Copenhagen (Denmark)	1–2	(Denmark) Brøndby	Estádio Algarve
12:00 GMT	Bardghji 88'	Report	Lauritsen 15'; Schwartau 53'

6 February 2024	Silkeborg (Denmark)	3–0	(Faroe Islands) Klaksvík	Estádio Algarve
14:00 GMT	McCowatt 22'; Carlsen 63'; Kusk 89'	Report

6 February 2024	Real Salt Lake (United States)	1–0	(Norway) Fredrikstad	Estádio Municipal de Lagos
16:00 GMT	Julio 36'	Report

8 February 2024	Copenhagen (Denmark)	3–0	(Norway) Molde	Estádio Algarve
13:00 GMT	Elyounoussi 3', 35'; Larsson 47'	Report

9 February 2024	Elfsborg (Sweden)	1–2	(Denmark) Silkeborg	Estádio Algarve
11:00 GMT	Rapp 14'	Report	Klynge 54'; McCowatt 67'

9 February 2024	Real Salt Lake (United States)	3–0	(Faroe Islands) Klaksvík	Estádio Municipal Bela Vista
13:00 GMT	Julio 38'; Ruiz 52'; Barajas 80'	Report

9 February 2024	Midtjylland (Denmark)	0–1	(Norway) Fredrikstad	Estádio Algarve
16:00 GMT		Report	Molde 80'

9 February 2024	Brøndby (Denmark)	1–3	(Sweden) Göteborg	Estádio Municipal Bela Vista
18:00 GMT	Rasmussen 89'	Report	Santos 3'; Mucolli 12'; Skjellerup 16'

=== 2025 edition ===
The 2025 tournament was held from 30 January–10 February 2025 with 7 teams competing.

Pos	Team	Pld	W	D	L	GF	GA	GD	Pts
1	(Denmark) Brøndby	3	2	0	1	8	7	+1	6
2	(Sweden) Värnamo	3	1	2	0	4	3	+1	5
3	(England) Brentford B	3	1	1	1	3	4	-1	5 (Note: Brentford B earned an additional point from their penalty shootout victory against Värnamo.)
4	(Portugal) Mafra	1	1	0	0	2	0	+2	3
5	(Sweden) Göteborg	2	1	0	1	2	2	0	3
6	(Norway) Rosenborg	3	0	1	2	2	4	-2	2 (Note: Rosenborg earned an additional point from their penalty shootout victory against Värnamo.)
7	(United States) FC Dallas	1	0	0	1	2	3	-1	0

30 January 2025	Brøndby (Denmark)	3–2	(United States) FC Dallas	Estádio Algarve
13:00 GMT	Kvistgaarden 20'; Suzuki 39'; Rajović 76'	Report	20' (o.g.); Farrington 79' (pen.)

30 January 2025	Göteborg (Sweden)	1–0	(Norway) Rosenborg	Estádio Algarve
19:00 GMT	41' (o.g.)	Report

2 February 2025	Brentford B (England)	0–2	(Portugal) Mafra	Estádio Algarve
12:00 GMT		Report	Matos 31'; 46' (o.g.)

4 February 2025	Brøndby (Denmark)	2–3	(Sweden) Värnamo	Estádio Algarve
16:00 GMT	Lauritsen 29'; 57' (o.g.)	Report	Alsalkhadi 40'; Kalu 60', 62'

5 February 2025	Göteborg (Sweden)	1–2	(England) Brentford B	Estádio Algarve
20:00 GMT	Erlingmark 44'	Report	Morgan 45'; Avenell 72'

7 February 2025	Brøndby (Denmark)	3–2	(Norway) Rosenborg	Estádio Algarve
16:00 GMT	Suzuki 39'; Nartey 53'; Wass 76'	Report	Þorvaldsson 78'; Sahsah 90'

9 February 2025	Värnamo (Sweden)	1–1 (2–4 p)	(England) Brentford B	Estádio Algarve
12:00 GMT	Thern 8'	Report	Brierley 30' (pen.)
	Penalties
	Alsalkhadi (penalty scored); Wenderson (penalty missed); Le Roux (penalty missed); Thern (penalty scored)		Brierley (penalty scored); Laidlaw (penalty scored); Avenell (penalty scored); McSorley (penalty scored)

10 February 2025	Rosenborg (Norway)	0–0 (4–1 p)	(Sweden) Värnamo	Estádio Algarve
16:00 GMT		Report
	Penalties
	Islamović (penalty scored); Broholm (penalty scored); Zeidan (penalty scored); Fossum (penalty scored)		Zeljković (penalty scored); Wenderson (penalty missed); Le Roux (penalty missed)

=== 2026 edition ===
The 2026 tournament was held from 25 January–6 February 2026 with 9 teams competing.

Pos	Team	Pld	W	D	L	GF	GA	GD	Pts
1	(United States) FC Dallas	2	2	0	0	7	2	+5	7 (Note: FC Dallas earned an additional point from scoring more than two goals against Brøndby.)
2	(Sweden) IFK Göteborg	2	2	0	0	4	1	+3	7 (Note: IFK Göteborg earned an additional point from scoring more than two goals against Artis Brno.)
3	(Denmark) Randers	2	2	0	0	4	2	+2	7 (Note: Randers earned an additional point from scoring more than two goals against Tromsø.)
4	(Sweden) Mjällby	2	1	0	1	4	2	+2	4 (Note: Mjällby earned an additional point from scoring more than two goals against Artis Brno.)
5	(Norway) Tromsø	2	1	0	1	3	3	0	3
6	(United States) Real Salt Lake	2	1	0	1	2	3	-1	3
7	(Norway) Rosenborg	2	0	0	2	0	2	-2	0
8	(Denmark) Brøndby	2	0	0	2	3	7	-4	0
9	(Czech Republic) Artis Brno	2	0	0	2	2	7	-5	0

25 January 2026	Randers (Denmark)	3–2	(Norway) Tromsø	Estádio Algarve
19:30 WET	Mo. Touré 18'; Olsen 26'; Mu. Touré 83'	Report	Camões 90'; Grundt 90+3'

26 January 2026	Brøndby (Denmark)	1–2	(United States) Real Salt Lake	Estádio Algarve
14:00 WET	Slisz 25'	Report	10'; Katranis 82'

26 January 2026	Brøndby (Denmark)	2–5	(United States) FC Dallas	Estádio Algarve
19:30 WET	Broberg 59'; Poulsen 80'	Report	Ibeagha 30'; Farrington 46', 52'; Johansson 62'; Simmonds 86'

30 January 2026	Real Salt Lake (United States)	0–2	(United States) FC Dallas	Estádio Municipal de Portimão
11:00 WET		Report	Musa 46'; Julio 90+4'

30 January 2026	Tromsø (Norway)	1–0	(Sweden) Mjällby	Estádio Algarve
14:00 WET	Olden Larsen 78'	Report

30 January 2026	Randers (Denmark)	1–0	(Norway) Rosenborg	Estádio Algarve
19:30 WET	Mahmoud 67'	Report

2 February 2026	Rosenborg (Norway)	0–1	(Sweden) IFK Göteborg	Estádio Algarve
19:30 WET		Report	Fenger 90'

3 February 2026	Mjällby (Sweden)	4–1	(Czech Republic) Artis Brno	Estádio Algarve
19:30 WET	Bergström 29', 32', 53'; Kennedy 71'	Report	Adebayo Adediran 15'

6 February 2026	IFK Göteborg (Sweden)	3–1	(Czech Republic) Artis Brno	Estádio Algarve
14:00 WET		Report

== Performance ==
=== By team ===
Team	Winners	Runners-up	Years won	Years runner-up
(Denmark) AGF	2	–	2018, 2020	–
(Russia) Zenit Saint Petersburg	2	–	2016, 2022	–
(Denmark) Brøndby	2	–	2023, 2025	–
(Denmark) Copenhagen	1	3	2014	2020, 2022, 2023
(Denmark) Silkeborg	1	1	2024	2013
(Sweden) Elfsborg	1	–	2011	–
(Denmark) Midtjylland	1	–	2012	–
(Austria) Rapid Wien	1	–	2013	–
(Russia) Dynamo Moscow	1	–	2015	–
(Croatia) HNK Rijeka	1	–	2017	–
(Austria) Red Bull Salzburg	1	–	2019	–
(United States) FC Dallas	1	–	2026	–
(Sweden) Örebro	–	3	–	2014, 2015, 2016
(Czech Republic) Jablonec	–	3	–	2017, 2018, 2019
(Denmark) OB	–	1	–	2011
(Croatia) Dinamo Zagreb	–	1	–	2012
(United States) Real Salt Lake	–	1	–	2024
(Sweden) Värnamo	–	1	–	2025
(Sweden) IFK Göteborg	–	1	–	2026

=== By country ===
Country	Winners	Runners-up	Years won	Years runner-up
Denmark	7	5	2012, 2014, 2018, 2020, 2023, 2024, 2025	2011, 2013, 2020, 2022, 2023
Russia	3	–	2015, 2016, 2022	–
Austria	2	–	2013, 2019	–
Sweden	1	5	2011	2014, 2015, 2016, 2025, 2026
Croatia	1	1	2017	2012
United States	1	1	2026	2024
Czech Republic	–	3	–	2017, 2018, 2019
