= Amer Duka =

Albanian footballer (born 1999)

Personal information
- Full name: Amer Duka
- Date of birth: 21 January 1999 (age 27)
- Place of birth: Shijak, Durrës, Albania
- Height: 1.83 m (6 ft 0 in)
- Position: Centre-back

Team information
- Current team: Egnatia
- Number: 4

Youth career
- 2011–2017: Teuta Durrës
- 2017: Akademia e Futbollit
- 2017–2018: Laçi

Senior career*
Years	Team	Apps	(Gls)
2017–2018	Laçi	0	(0)
2018–2020	Teuta	0	(0)
2018–2019	→ Erzeni (loan)	19	(0)
2020	Luftëtari	13	(0)
2020–2021	Skënderbeu Korçë	3	(0)
2021	Kastrioti	1	(0)
2021–2022	Dukagjini	0	(0)
2022	Korabi	5	(0)
2022–2023	Tërbuni	4	(0)
2023	Erzeni	0	(0)
2024–	Egnatia	1	(0)

International career
2015	Albania U17	2	(0)
2016	Albania U19	1	(0)
2017	Albania U21	1	(0)
- * Club domestic league appearances and goals as of 1 June 2024

Amer Duka (born 21 January 1999) is an Albanian professional footballer who plays as a centre-back for Albanian club Egnatia.

== International career ==
He received his first call up for the Albania under-20 side by same coach of the under-21 team Alban Bushi for the friendly match against Georgia U20 on 14 November 2017. He debuted for under-20 team against Georgia coming on as a substitute in the 55th minute for Leonardo Maloku in an eventual 3–0 loss.

== Career statistics ==
=== Club ===
As of 30 November 2017

Club statistics
Club	Season	League			Cup		Europe (Note: Including continental competitions, such as UEFA Champions League and UEFA Europa League)		Other (Note: Including other competitions, such as Albanian Supercup)		Total	
Club	Season	Division	Apps	Goals	Apps	Goals	Apps	Goals	Apps	Goals	Apps	Goals
Laçi	2017–18	Albanian Superliga	0	0	2	0	—		—		2	0
Career total			0	0	2	0	—		—		2	0

== Honours ==
Egnatia

- Albanian Cup: 2023–24
