= Rei Nuriu =

Albanian footballer

Personal information
- Date of birth: 16 October 1998 (age 28)
- Place of birth: Tirana, Albania
- Height: 1.83 m (6 ft 0 in)
- Position: Midfielder

Youth career
- 2011–2017: Tirana

Senior career*
Years	Team	Apps	(Gls)
2017–2019	Dinamo Tirana	47	(0)
2019–2020	Skënderbeu	0	(0)
2020–2021	Kastrioti	29	(0)
2021–2022	Dinamo Tirana	1	(0)
2022	→ Erzeni (loan)	6	(0)
Total		83	(0)

International career
2017–2018	Albania U20	1	(0)
- * Club domestic league appearances and goals

Rei Nuriu (born 16 October 1998) is an Albanian former professional footballer who plays as a midfielder.

== International career ==
Nuriu received his first call up to the Albania national under-19 team by coach Arjan Bellaj for the friendly tournament Roma Caput Mundi from 29 February–4 March 2016.

He received his first call up for the Albania under-20 side by same coach of the under-21 team Alban Bushi for the friendly match against Georgia U20 on 14 November 2017. He debuted for under-20 team against Georgia coming on as a substitute in the 55th minute for Shaqir Tafa in an eventual 3–0 loss.

== Career statistics ==
=== Club ===
As of 23 December 2017

Club statistics
Club	Season	League			Cup		Europe (Note: Including continental competitions, such as UEFA Champions League and UEFA Europa League)		Other (Note: Including other competitions, such as Albanian Supercup)		Total	
Club	Season	Division	Apps	Goals	Apps	Goals	Apps	Goals	Apps	Goals	Apps	Goals
Tirana	2015–16	Albanian Superliga	0	0	—		—		—		0	0
Dinamo Tirana	2017–18	Albanian First Division	10	0	—		—		—		10	0
Career total			10	0	—		—		—		10	0
