= Leonardo Maloku =

Albanian footballer

Personal information
- Date of birth: 18 May 1998 (age 28)
- Place of birth: Tirana, Albania
- Height: 1.85 m (6 ft 1 in)
- Position: Right-back

Team information
- Current team: Turris Calcio Pescara

Youth career
- –2017: Pescara

Senior career*
Years	Team	Apps	(Gls)
2015–2019	Pescara	0	(0)
2017–2018	→ Santarcangelo (loan)	17	(0)
2018–2019	→ Fano (loan)	1	(0)
2019	→ Fermana (loan)	6	(0)
2019–2020	San Roque	11	(0)
2021	Rosetana		
2021–2023	2000 Calcio Montesilvano		
2023–	Turris Calcio Pescara		

International career^{‡}
2014	Albania U17	3	(0)
2016	Albania U19	3	(0)
2017	Albania U20	1	(0)
2017–2019	Albania U21	10	(0)
- * Club domestic league appearances and goals as of 31 August 2019 ‡ National team caps and goals as of 16 October 2018

Leonardo Maloku (born 18 May 1998) is an Albanian professional footballer who plays as a right-back for Spanish club San Roque and the Albania national under-21 team.

== Club career ==
=== Pescara ===
He signed his first professional contract with Pescara on 29 July 2016 for 5 years valid until 2021. He was gathered for the first time with the first team in the pre-season preparatory stage and was activated in all 3 friendly games mading impressive performances convincing coach Massimo Oddo and the club to sign with him the professional contract.

==== Loan to Santarcangelo ====
He made his debut on 27 August 2017 against Pordenone in the 2017–18 Serie C Group B (North & Central East) opening season, playing the full 90-minutes under coach Giuseppe Angelini in a 0–1 loss with a 90'+4 minute goal.

==== Loan to Fermana ====
On 31 January 2019, he joined Fermana on loan.

=== San Roque ===
On 4 August 2019, he signed with Spanish club San Roque.

== International career ==
He received his first call up for the Albania under-20 side by same coach of the under-21 team Alban Bushi for the friendly match against Georgia U20 on 14 November 2017. He debuted for under-20 team against Georgia by playing as a starter until 55th minute when he was substituted off for Amer Duka with score at 1–0 and the entire match finished in an eventual 3–0 loss.

== Career statistics ==
=== Club ===
As of 22 December 2017

Club statistics
Club	Season	League			Cup		Europe (Note: Including continental competitions, such as UEFA Champions League and UEFA Europa League)		Other		Total	
Club	Season	Division	Apps	Goals	Apps	Goals	Apps	Goals	Apps	Goals	Apps	Goals
Pescara	2015–16	Serie B	0	0	—		—		—		0	0
Pescara	2016–17	Serie B	0	0	0	0	—		—		0	0
Pescara	Total		0	0	0	0	—		—		0	0
Santarcangelo	2017–18	Serie C	11	0	1	0	—		—		12	0
Career total			11	0	1	0	—		—		12	0

Sporting positions
Preceded by Ardit Toli	Albania U19 captain 2011–2016	Succeeded by Rezart Rama
