= Lirim Mema =

Kosovan footballer (born 1998)

Personal information
- Date of birth: 23 January 1998 (age 28)
- Place of birth: Tetovo, Macedonia
- Height: 1.80 m (5 ft 11 in)
- Position: Right-back

Team information
- Current team: Tasmania Berlin
- Number: 22

Youth career
- SC Staaken
- –2014: Tennis Borussia Berlin
- 2014–2017: Eintracht Braunschweig

Senior career*
Years	Team	Apps	(Gls)
2017–2019	Eintracht Braunschweig II	45	(2)
2019–2020	Flamurtari	3	(0)
2020	Drita	3	(0)
2021	Rot-Weiß Erfurt	0	(0)
2021–2022	Tennis Borussia Berlin	29	(3)
2022–	Tasmania Berlin	52	(1)

International career
2017–2019	Kosovo U21	11	(1)
- * Club domestic league appearances and goals as of 20:30, 26 November 2024 (UTC)

Lirim Mema (born 23 January 1998) is a Kosovan professional footballer who plays as a right-back for German club Tasmania Berlin.

== Club career ==
=== Eintracht Braunschweig II ===
On 2 August 2017, Mema made his debut with Eintracht Braunschweig II in a Regionalliga Nord match against Lüneburger SK Hansa after being named in the starting line-up.

=== Flamurtari ===
On 14 August 2019, Mema joined Albanian Superliga side Flamurtari. On 28 August 2019, he made his debut in a 0–3 home defeat against Kukësi after being named in the starting line-up.

=== Drita ===
On 10 February 2020, Mema joined Football Superleague of Kosovo side Drita, on a two-year contract.

== International career ==
On 29 August 2017, Mema received a call-up from Kosovo U21 for a 2019 UEFA European Under-21 Championship qualification matches against Norway U21 and Germany U21. On 1 September 2017, he made his debut with Kosovo U21 in a 2019 UEFA European Under-21 Championship qualification against Norway U21 after being named in the starting line-up.
