= Arbnor Muçolli =

Albanian footballer (born 1999)

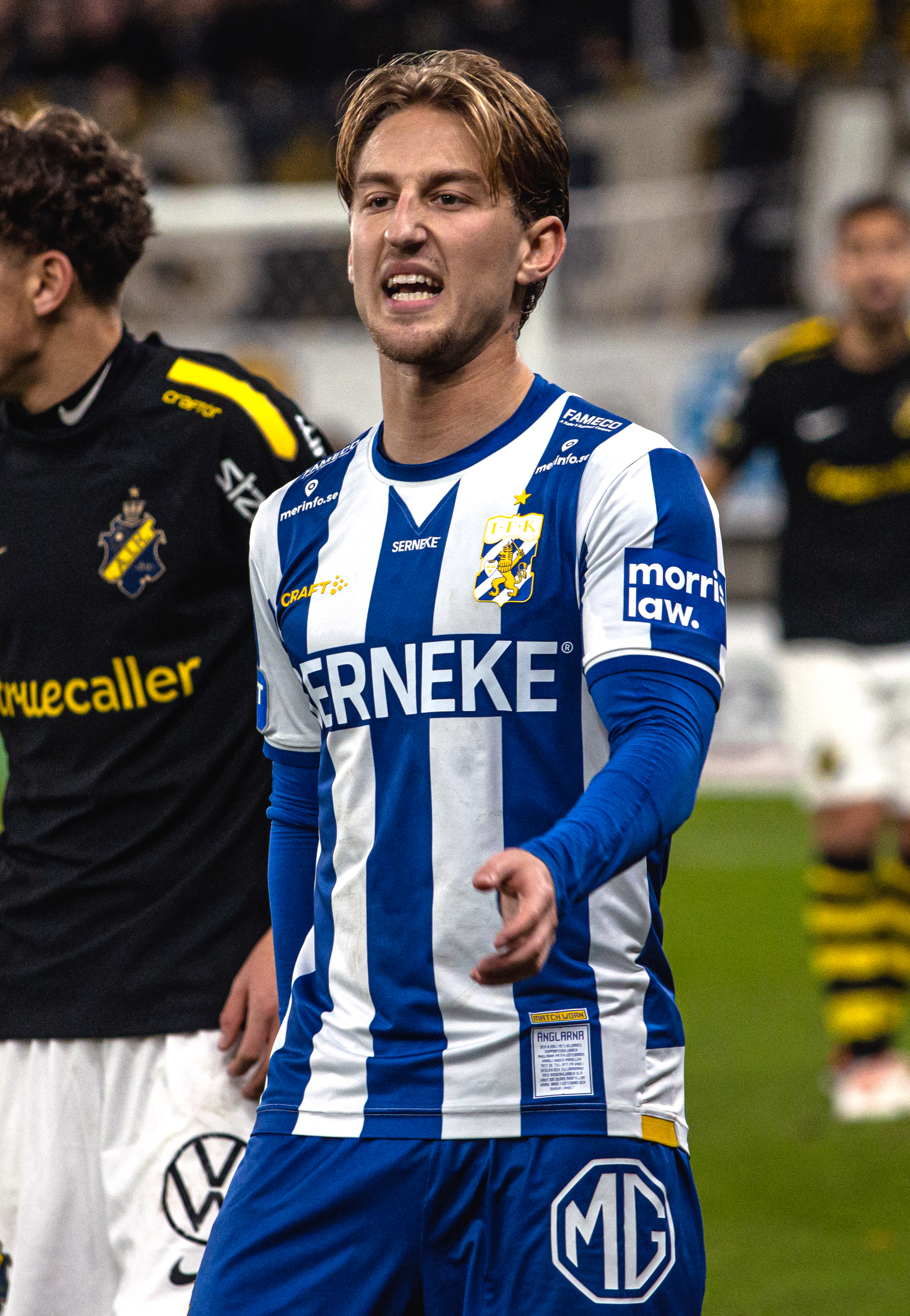
- Muçolli with IFK Göteborg in 2023

Personal information
- Full name: Arbnor Muçolli
- Date of birth: 15 September 1999 (age 27)
- Place of birth: Fredericia, Denmark
- Height: 1.75 m (5 ft 9 in)
- Position: Winger

Team information
- Current team: IFK Göteborg
- Number: 19

Youth career
- 2004–2012: Fredericia
- 2012–2017: Vejle

Senior career*
Years	Team	Apps	(Gls)
2016–2023	Vejle	149	(24)
2023–	IFK Göteborg	30	(8)

International career^{‡}
2016–2017	Denmark U18	4	(0)
2018–2019	Albania U21	11	(1)
2022–	Albania	6	(0)
- * Club domestic league appearances and goals as of 22:30, 10 August 2024 (UTC) ‡ National team caps and goals as of 21:11, 25 March 2024 (UTC)

Arbnor Muçolli ([muˈtʃɔɫi]; born 15 September 1999) is a professional footballer who plays as a winger for Allsvenskan club IFK Göteborg and the Albania national team.

He began his senior career with Vejle in Denmark, where he progressed from the youth system and established himself as a first-team player, before moving to IFK Göteborg in 2023. He has also represented Denmark at youth level and later switched international allegiance to Albania, making his senior debut in 2022 and featuring in UEFA Euro 2024 qualifying.

== Club career ==
=== Early career and Vejle BK ===
Muçolli was born in Fredericia, Denmark, to ethnic Albanian parents from Podujevo, Kosovo, and began his career with local club Fredericia at the age of five alongside his elder brother Agon.

Having established himself as a central midfielder, Muçolli made his debut for Vejle BK on 17 November 2016, aged 17, in a match against Næstved BK, playing 80 minutes before being substituted.

Muçolli missed parts of the 2017–18 season due to injury but still made 15 appearances, contributing to Vejle's promotion to the Superliga.

During the 2018–19 Danish Superliga season, Muçolli became a first-team regular, making 25 league appearances and scoring once, although Vejle were relegated. On 25 July 2018, he extended his contract with the club until 2020.

During the 2019–20 Danish 1st Division season, he helped Vejle earn promotion back to the Danish Superliga, making 26 appearances and winning Player of the Season honours. On 6 July 2020, Muçolli scored a hat-trick in a 4–1 win over Roskilde.

=== IFK Göteborg ===
On 6 July 2023, Muçolli joined Swedish club IFK Göteborg on a contract running until the end of 2026. He made his competitive debut four days later, replacing Marcus Berg at half-time in a 2–1 Allsvenskan defeat against Varbergs BoIS at Gamla Ullevi. His first start for Blåvitt came the following week in a draw away to IF Elfsborg, where he played 81 minutes before being substituted. On 13 August, he scored his first goal for the club in a 2–1 home win over Djurgårdens IF. He scored his first brace on 3 September in a 2–2 draw against Malmö FF, a match temporarily interrupted after objects were thrown from the stands following his second goal. Due to his outstanding performances throughout September 2023, including three goals in three appearances, he was awarded the title of Player of the Month for September. In his debut half-season with IFK Göteborg, Muçolli scored six goals in 17 appearances as the club narrowly avoided relegation by finishing 13th in the league.

Muçolli started 2024 scoring two goals in three Svenska Cupen matches. In August 2024, Muçolli suffered a serious ligament injury while playing against IFK Värnamo, ruling him out for the remainder of the 2024 season and requiring surgery. Although he returned to partial training in July 2025, Swedish media reported in September 2025 that he would miss the remainder of the season after suffering a setback during his recovery from the anterior cruciate ligament injury.

== International career ==
Born in Denmark, he was capped four times at under-18 level, making his debut on 8 March 2017 against Italy.

Being of Albanian descent, Muçolli obtained Albanian citizenship on 8 February 2018, making him eligible to represent Albania internationally. Muçolli represented the Albania under-21 side in the 2019 and 2021 UEFA European Under-21 Championship qualifiers, making his debut against Spain on 6 September 2018, scoring once against Kosovo on 15 October 2019 and earning 10 caps overall.

Muçolli made his senior debut for Albania in a friendly against Estonia on 13 June 2022, and later that year also featured in two additional friendly matches under head coach Edoardo Reja. He made his competitive debut on 20 November 2023 in a UEFA Euro 2024 qualifying match against the Faroe Islands, coming on as a substitute for the final 30 minutes of the 0–0 draw, a result that secured Albania first place in Group E despite finishing level on 15 points with the Czech Republic but ahead on head-to-head records. He was considered as part of the squad rotation options for the UEFA Euro 2024 finals but ultimately missed inclusion after suffering an injury in May 2024.

== Career statistics ==
=== Club ===
As of match played 31 December 2025

Appearances and goals by club, season and competition
Club	Season	League			National cup		Other		Total	
Club	Season	Division	Apps	Goals	Apps	Goals	Apps	Goals	Apps	Goals
Vejle	2016–17	1st Division	3	0	—		—		3	0
Vejle	2017–18	1st Division	15	0	1	0	—		16	0
Vejle	2018–19	Superliga	25	1	1	0	1 (Note: One appearance at 2018–19 Danish Superliga Relegation play-offs)	0	27	1
Vejle	2019–20	1st Division	26	7	0	0	—		26	7
Vejle	2020–21	Superliga	26	4	2	0	—		28	4
Vejle	2021–22	Superliga	26	5	5	0	—		31	5
Vejle	2022–23	1st Division	14	4	1	0	—		15	4
Vejle	Total		135	21	10	0	1	0	150	21
IFK Göteborg	2023	Allsvenskan	17	6	—		—		17	6
IFK Göteborg	2024	Allsvenskan	6	1	3	2	—		9	3
IFK Göteborg	2025	Allsvenskan	Did not feature due to injury							
IFK Göteborg	Total		23	7	3	2	—		26	9
Career total			158	28	13	2	1	0	176	30

=== International ===
As of 25 March 2024

National team	Year	Apps	Goals
Albania	2022	3	0
Albania	2023	1	0
Albania	2024	2	0
Total		6	0

== Honours ==
Vejle

- Danish 1st Division: 2017–18, 2019–20, 2022–23

Individual

- Danish 1st Division Player of the Season: 2019–20
- Danish Superliga Goal of the Season: 2020–21
- Allsvenskan Player of the Month: September 2023
