= Shaqir Tafa =

Albanian professional footballer (born 1998)

Personal information
- Full name: Shaqir Ejup Tafa
- Date of birth: 14 November 1998 (age 27)
- Place of birth: Fondi, Italy
- Height: 1.91 m (6 ft 3 in)
- Position: Centre-back

Team information
- Current team: Real Montecchio

Youth career
- Annonese
- 2010–2014: Liventina
- 2014–2017: Palermo

Senior career*
| Years | Team | Apps | (Gls) |
| 2017–2018 | Palermo | 0 | (0) |
| 2017–2018 | → Monopoli (loan) | 5 | (0) |
| 2018–2019 | Cuneo | 11 | (1) |
| 2019–2020 | Sicula Leonzio | 12 | (0) |
| 2020 | Tirana | 0 | (0) |
| 2021–2022 | Piacenza | 24 | (0) |
| 2022 | Recanatese | 6 | (0) |
| 2023 | Ravenna | 13 | (0) |
| 2023–2024 | Forlì | 29 | (1) |
| 2024–2025 | Fermana | 29 | (1) |
| 2025–2026 | Sangiuliano | 26 | (1) |
| 2026– | Real Montecchio | 0 | (0) |

International career
| 2017 | Albania U20 | 1 | (0) |
| 2017–2019 | Albania U21 | 23 | (2) |
- * Club domestic league appearances and goals as of 28 September 2026

Shaqir Ejup Tafa (born 14 November 1998) is an Albanian professional footballer who plays as a centre-back for Italian Serie D club Real Montecchio.

== Early life ==
Tafa was born in Fondi, province of Latina, Lazio from Albanian parents originally from Luz i Vogël, Kavajë which had emigrated in Italy in 1994. He was 4th family's child and the first son after three daughters. Aged 2, he along with his parents moved to Portogruaro in Veneto and then to Belfiore near Venezia. He started his footballing career there by playing as a forward at Annonese for three years.

Tafa switched position to centre-back following his transfer to Liventina. He enjoyed success there, winning Veneto's national title in 2013. After several trials in 2014, he was brought in by Palermo on initially on loan. In the following years Tafa progressed through Palermo's youth teams, and was notably voted as Palermo primavera's best player of the year, receiving 47% of total votes. He was called for the first time at senior squad in 2017.

== Club career ==
=== Monopoli (loan) ===
On 5 August 2017 Tafa was loaned out to Serie C side Monopoli until the end of the 2017–18 season. Under management of Massimiliano Tangorra Tafa was considered as 6th center-defense choice behind most used trio formed by team's captain Luca Ricci, Mattia Bei and Michele Ferrara (including also Mario Mercadante which was often used as a center-back in place of Ferrara) and other substituters Loris Bacchetti and Nicola Lanzolla. Consequently, Tafa was on the bench for 13 first matches. He made his debut in the penultimate matchday of the year on 23 December against Cosenza playing as a starter along Ricci and Mercadante, thus benching Ferrara whereas Bei moved as a midfielder; Tafa was substituted off in the 73rd minute as the match ended in a 2–0 loss for Monopoli which remained with ten men since the 68th minute.

=== Cuneo ===
On 7 August 2018, he moved on a permanent basis to the Serie C club Cuneo.

=== Sicula Leonzio ===
On 2 September 2019, he signed with Sicula Leonzio.

=== Piacenza ===
After a three-months spell with Albanian club Tirana where he did not appear for the senior squad and was released in November 2020, on 2 February 2021 he returned to Italy and signed with Piacenza.

=== Recanatese ===
On 12 July 2022, he moved to Recanatese.

=== Ravenna ===
On 28 January 2023, Tafa joined Serie D club Ravenna.

== International career ==
=== Early stages: Italy & Albania U19 ===
Early in 2013 Tafa had a gathering stage with Italy national under-17 football team, from where he was scouted by Paolo Tramezzani the Albania national football team assistant coach of Gianni De Biasi. Then in January 2016 he received a call up at Albania national under-19 football team by coach Arjan Bellaj for a gathering stage in Verona, Italy.

=== Albania U21 ===
Tafa received his first international call up to Albania national under-21 football team by coach Redi Jupi for the 2017 UEFA European Under-21 Championship qualification closing match against Israel U21 on 10 October 2016. He didn't feature in the game as he wasn't included in the final 18-man squad.

He was called up by new coach Alban Bushi for a double Friendly matches against Moldova U21 on 25 & 27 March 2017. He debuted for Albania U21 in the second match against Moldova U21 on 27 March playing as a starter to help his side to take a 2–0 victory.

Since he had not debuted yet for Albania in international competitive matches, in April 2017 Tafa was asked again by Italy for their national under-19 team but Tafa answered indirectly to have refused their invitation by posting on social media Facebook a picture while singing the national anthem of Albania during a March's match against Moldova U21.

Tafa was called up by coach Alban Bushi for the Friendly match against France U21 on 5 June 2017 and the 2019 UEFA European Under-21 Championship qualification opening match against Estonia U21 on 12 June 2017. He made his competitive debut for Albania U21 against Estonia U21 on 12 June 2017 under coach Alban Bushi playing the full 90-minutes match to help his side to take a goalless draw. He received his first call up for the Albania under-20 side by same coach of the under-21 team Alban Bushi for the friendly match against Georgia on 14 November 2017. He debuted for under-20 team against Georgia by playing as a starter, where he was granted as team captain, to play until 55th minute when he was substituted off for Rei Nuriu with score at 1–0 and the entire match finished in an eventual 3–0 loss.

== Style of play ==
Tafa mainly operates as a centre-back, but he can play also as a right back and defensive midfielder. He is nicknamed Shaq alike former NBA star Shaquille O'Neal due to his height. He has been compared to 2006 FIFA World Cup winner Andrea Barzagli due to his powerful physical build and power. Tafa himself has cited his role model the Slovak defender Milan Škriniar.

== Career statistics ==
=== Club ===
As of match played 29 September 2021

Appearances and goals by club, season and competition
| Club | Season | League | | | National Cup | | League Cup | | Other | | Total | |
| Club | Season | Division | Apps | Goals | Apps | Goals | Apps | Goals | Apps | Goals | Apps | Goals |
|---|---|---|---|---|---|---|---|---|---|---|---|---|
| Monopoli (loan) | 2017–18 | Serie C | 4 | 0 | — | | — | | — | | 4 | 0 |
| Cuneo | 2018–19 | Serie C | 10 | 1 | — | | 2 | 0 | 1 (Note: Appearance(s) in Relegation Playoffs) | 0 | 13 | 1 |
| Sicula Leonzio | 2019–20 | Serie C | 12 | 0 | — | | 1 | 0 | 1 | 0 | 14 | 0 |
| Piacenza | 2020–21 | Serie C | 13 | 0 | — | | — | | — | | 13 | 0 |
| Piacenza | 2021–22 | Serie C | 3 | 0 | — | | 2 | 1 | — | | 5 | 1 |
| Piacenza | Total | | 16 | 0 | 0 | 0 | 2 | 1 | 0 | 0 | 18 | 1 |
| Career total | | | 42 | 1 | 0 | 0 | 5 | 1 | 2 | 0 | 49 | 2 |

Sporting positions
| Preceded by Aldo Teqja | Albania U20 captain 2017– | Succeeded by Incumbent |
