= Kolbeinn Þórðarson =

Icelandic football player (born 2000)

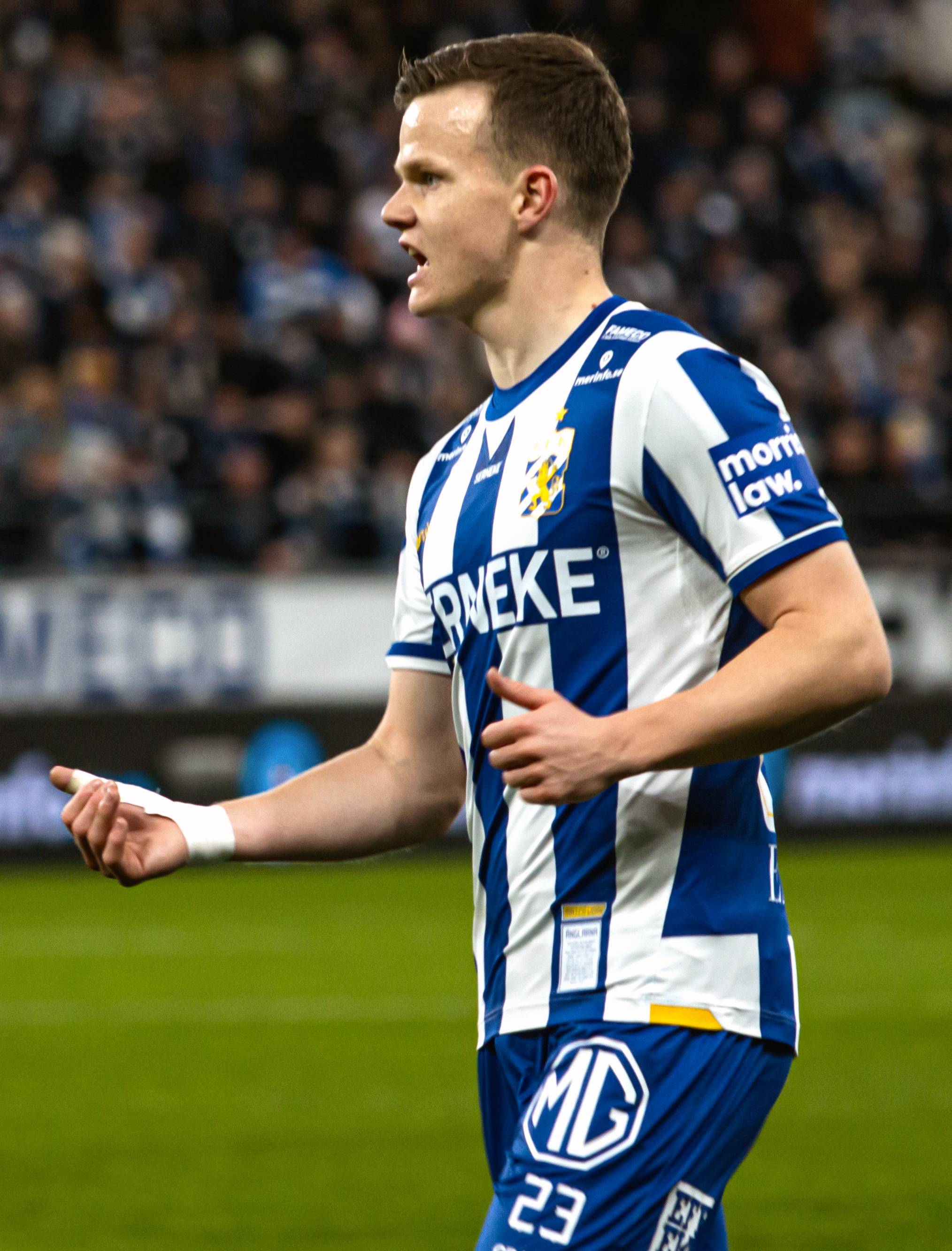

Personal information
- Full name: Kolbeinn Þórðarson
- Date of birth: 12 March 2000 (age 26)
- Place of birth: Kópavogur, Iceland
- Height: 1.77 m (5 ft 10 in)
- Position: Central midfielder

Team information
- Current team: IFK Göteborg
- Number: 23

Senior career*
Years	Team	Apps	(Gls)
2017–2019	Breiðablik	32	(4)
2019–2023	Lommel	88	(7)
2023–	IFK Göteborg	75	(11)

International career^{‡}
2016	Iceland U16	6	(0)
2016	Iceland U17	1	(0)
2018	Iceland U19	2	(0)
2019–2022	Iceland U21	19	(1)
2021–	Iceland	3	(0)
- * Club domestic league appearances and goals as of 19:12, 19 September 2026 (UTC) ‡ National team caps and goals as of 01:04, 10 February 2024 (UTC)

Kolbeinn Þórðarson (anglicized Thordarson) (born 12 March 2000) is an Icelandic professional footballer who plays as a central midfielder for IFK Göteborg and the Iceland national team.

== Club career ==
Kolbeinn played his first senior team games in 2017 with Breiðablik. In July 2019, Kolbeinn signed a three-year contract with Lommel.

In August 2023, Kolbeinn signed for Allsvenskan club IFK Göteborg on a contract until the end of the season.

== International career ==
He made his debut for Iceland national football team on 8 June 2021 in a friendly against Poland. He substituted Aron Gunnarsson in the 87th minute of a 2–2 away draw.

== Career statistics ==
=== Club ===
As of 12 August 2025

Club	Season	League			Cup		Continental		Other		Total	
Club	Season	Division	Apps	Goals	Apps	Goals	Apps	Goals	Apps	Goals	Apps	Goals
Breiðablik	2017	Úrvalsdeild	7	0	0	0	0	0	0	0	7	0
Breiðablik	2018	Úrvalsdeild	12	0	4 (Note: Appearances in the Icelandic Cup)	0	0	0	0	0	16	0
Breiðablik	2019	Úrvalsdeild	13	4	3	0	2 (Note: Appearances in the UEFA Europa League)	0	0	0	18	4
Breiðablik	Total		32	4	7	0	2	0	0	0	41	4
Lommel	2019–20	Proximus League	23	1	2 (Note: Appearances in the Belgian Cup)	0	–		0	0	25	1
Lommel	2020–21	Proximus League	22	2	1	0	–		0	0	23	2
Lommel	2021–22	Proximus League	18	2	2	0	–		0	0	20	2
Lommel	2022–23	Challenger Pro League	18	1	1	0	–		0	0	19	1
Lommel	Total		81	6	6	0	0	0	0	0	87	6
IFK Göteborg	2023	Allsvenskan	10	0	0	0	–		0	0	10	0
IFK Göteborg	2024	Allsvenskan	27	3	3 (Note: Appearances in the Swedish Cup)	1	–		7	1	37	5
IFK Göteborg	2025	Allsvenskan	16	6	4	1	–		1	0	21	7
IFK Göteborg	Total		53	9	7	2	0	0	8	1	68	12
Career total			166	22	20	2	2	0	8	1	196	22

== Honours ==
Individual

- Årets Ärkeängel: 2025
