= Ardit Gashi =

Footballer (born 1998)

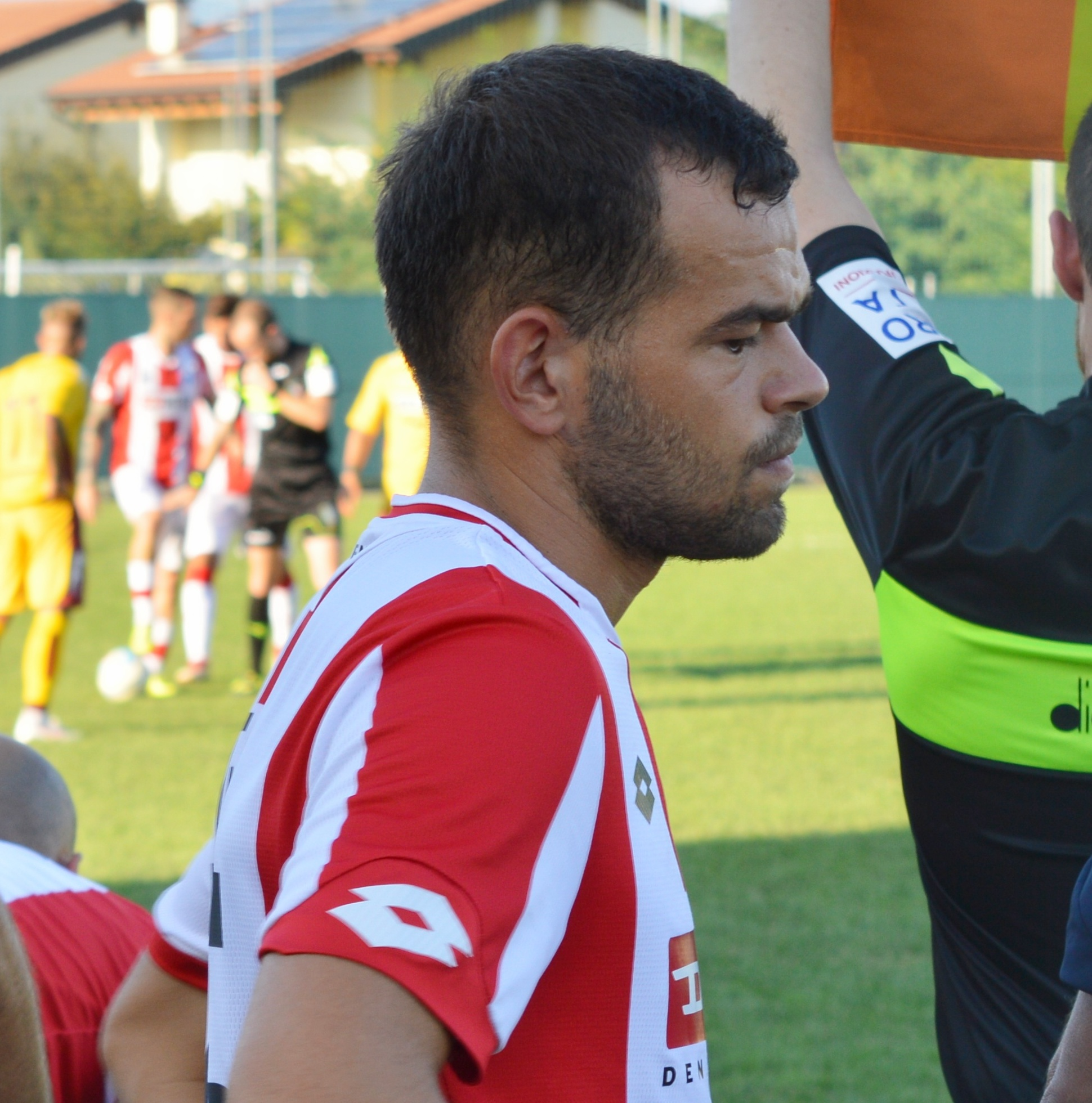
- Gashi with Vicenza Virtus in 2018

Personal information
- Date of birth: 27 November 1998 (age 27)
- Place of birth: Treviso, Italy
- Height: 1.75 m (5 ft 9 in)
- Position: Forward

Team information
- Current team: FC Bassano

Youth career
- 2010–2011: Padernello
- 2011–2015: Giorgione
- 2016: → Torino (loan)

Senior career*
Years	Team	Apps	(Gls)
2015–2016	Giorgione	36	(7)
2017–2018	Bassano Virtus 55	22	(3)
2018–2019	Vicenza Virtus	7	(0)
2019–	Luparense	15	(0)

International career^{‡}
2017–	Kosovo U21	10	(1)
- * Club domestic league appearances and goals as of 14:41, 9 March 2020 (UTC) ‡ National team caps and goals as of 14:41, 9 March 2020 (UTC)

Ardit Gashi (born 9 December 1998) is a professional footballer who plays as a forward for Italian club FC Bassano. Born in Italy, he has represented the Kosovo U21 national team at international level.

== Early life ==
Gashi was born in Treviso, Italy from Kosovo Albanian parents from Suva Reka.

== Club career ==
=== Giorgione ===
On 6 September 2015, Gashi made his debut in a 0–0 home draw against Abano after being named in the starting line-up.

==== Loan at Torino Primavera ====
On 28 July 2016, Gashi joined Campionato Nazionale Primavera side Torino Primavera. On 17 December 2016, he made his debut in a 2–2 home draw against Udinese after coming on as a substitute in place of Filippo Berardi.

=== Bassano Virtus 55 ===
On 2 January 2017, Gashi joined Serie C side Bassano Virtus 55. On 12 March 2017, he made his debut in a 1–0 away defeat against Sambenedettese after coming on as a substitute at 84th minute in place of Michael Fabbro. On 7 July 2017, the club announced that Gashi signed a three-year professional contract with Bassano Virtus 55.

=== Vicenza Virtus ===
On 24 May 2018, Stefano Rosso, the chairman of Bassano Virtus 55 announced the merging of the team with another Serie C club Vicenza Virtus and after the merging of the teams like most players of Bassano Virtus 55, also Gashi became part of the Vicenza Virtus. On 29 July 2018, he made his debut with Vicenza Virtus in the first round of 2018–19 Coppa Italia against Chieri after coming on as a substitute at 60th minute in place of Gianluca Laurenti. On 3 October 2019, his contract was dissolved by mutual consent.

=== Luparense ===
On 6 October 2019, he joined fourth-tier Serie D club Luparense.

== International career ==
On 21 March 2017, Gashi received a call-up from Kosovo U21 for a 2019 UEFA European Under-21 Championship qualification match against Republic of Ireland U21 and made his debut after being named in the starting line-up.
