= Ingo Klemen =

Austrian footballer

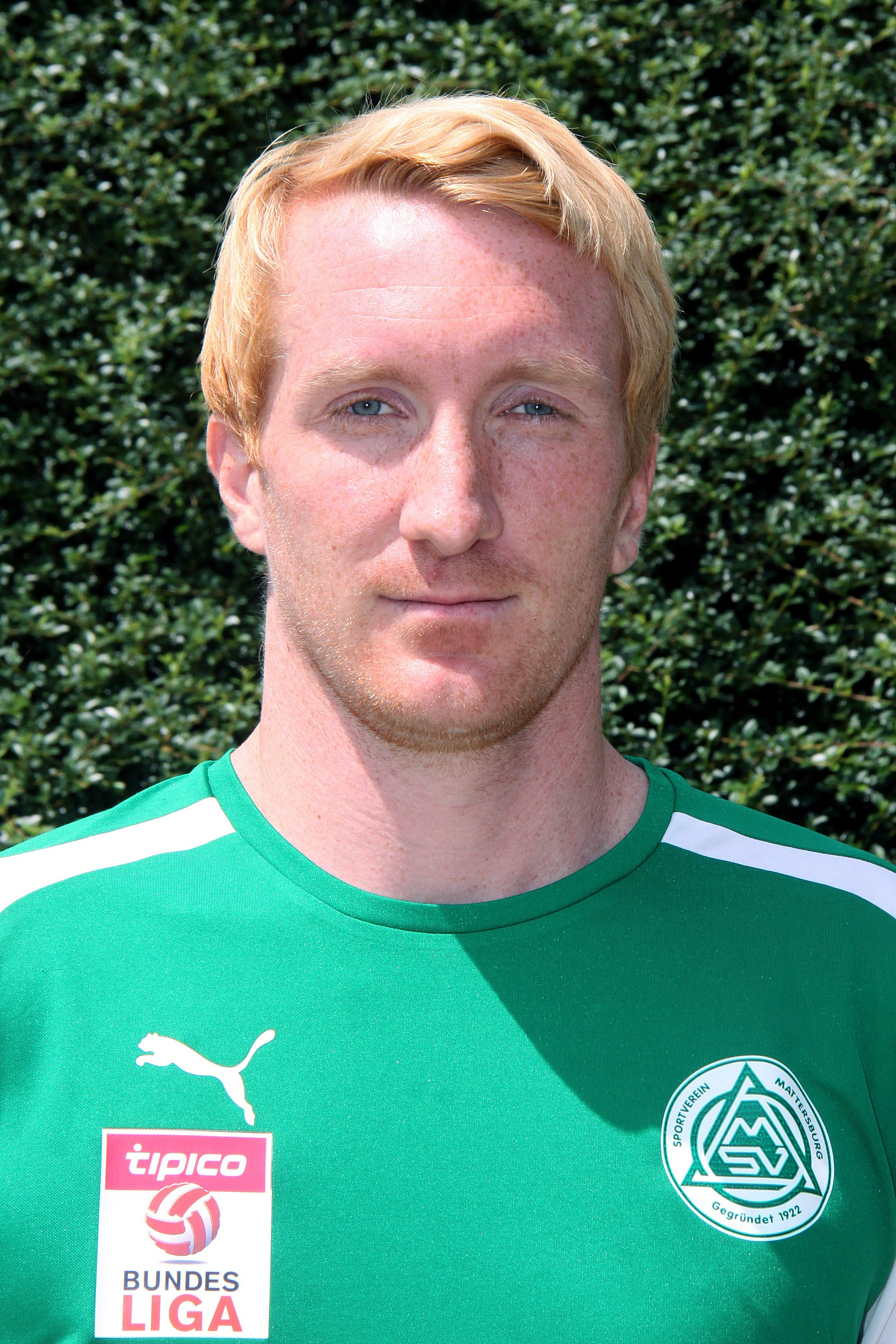

Personal information
- Full name: Ingo Klemen
- Date of birth: 29 July 1986 (age 40)
- Place of birth: Austria
- Height: 1.85 m (6 ft 1 in)
- Position: Forward

Team information
- Current team: SV Mattersburg
- Number: 9

Senior career*
Years	Team	Apps	(Gls)
2010–2012	1. SC Sollenau	56	(30)
2012–	SV Mattersburg II	32	(24)
2012–	SV Mattersburg	61	(14)
- * Club domestic league appearances and goals as of 00:18, 3 January 2016 (UTC)

Ingo Klemen (born 29 July 1986) is an Austrian professional footballer who currently plays as an attacker for SV Mattersburg in the Austrian Football First League.
