= Thomas Santos =

Danish footballer (born 1998)

- Santos with Motor Lublin in 2026

Personal information
- Full name: Thomas Santos Christensen
- Date of birth: 10 October 1998 (age 28)
- Place of birth: Silkeborg, Denmark
- Height: 1.78 m (5 ft 10 in)
- Positions: Right-back; winger

Team information
- Current team: Motor Lublin
- Number: 29

Youth career
- –2008: Silkeborg KFUM
- 2008–2017: Silkeborg IF

Senior career*
Years	Team	Apps	(Gls)
2017–2021	Skive IK	103	(13)
2021–2023	AC Horsens	61	(4)
2023–2025	IFK Göteborg	65	(4)
2026–	Motor Lublin	7	(0)
- * Club domestic league appearances and goals as of 21:36, 29 May 2026 (UTC)

Thomas Santos Christensen (Brazilian Portuguese: [ˈsɐ̃tus], born 10 October 1998) is a Danish professional footballer who plays for Ekstraklasa club Motor Lublin as a right-back and winger.
