= Laurs Skjellerup =

Danish footballer (born 2002)

Personal information
- Full name: Laurs Østerby Skjellerup
- Date of birth: 12 August 2002 (age 24)
- Place of birth: Mariager, Denmark
- Height: 1.95 m (6 ft 5 in)
- Position: Striker

Team information
- Current team: Sassuolo
- Number: 19

Youth career
- –2018: Hobro
- 2018–2022: Randers

Senior career*
Years	Team	Apps	(Gls)
2020–2022	Randers	2	(0)
2022–2023	Hobro	49	(5)
2024	IFK Göteborg	19	(4)
2025–	Sassuolo	6	(0)
2026	→ Spezia (loan)	6	(0)
- * Club domestic league appearances and goals as of 13 May 2026

Laurs Østerby Skjellerup (born 12 August 2002) is a Danish professional footballer who plays as a striker for Serie A club Sassuolo.

== Career ==
=== Randers ===
A youth product of Randers FC, whom he had joined from Hobro, Skjellerup made his professional debut for the club on 28 June 2020, appearing as a late substitute for Emil Riis Jakobsen in a 3–0 home defeat to AC Horsens in the Danish Superliga. He made one further appearance that season, featuring briefly against Esbjerg fB on 8 July 2020. During the 2019–20 and 2020–21 campaigns, Skjellerup primarily played for Randers' under-19 side.

=== Hobro ===
On 12 July 2022, Skjellerup returned to former club Hobro IK, signing a three-year contract with the Danish 1st Division side.

=== IFK Göteborg ===
On 29 December 2023, Skjellerup signed a four-year contract with Allsvenskan club IFK Göteborg. He made 19 league appearances in his first season, scoring four goals, including three in the final six matches of the campaign.

=== Sassuolo ===
On 20 January 2025, Skjellerup joined Serie B club Sassuolo. While the club did not disclose the contract length, media reports indicated a deal running until June 2029. The reported transfer fee was €3.2 million.

On 2 February 2026, Skjellerup joined Italian club Spezia on loan until 30 June 2026.

== Honours ==
Sassuolo

- Serie B: 2024–25
