= 2024 Ulsan HD FC season =

Ulsan HD
2024 season
- Owner: Kwon Oh-gap
- Head coach: Kim Pan-gon
- Stadium: Ulsan Munsu Football Stadium
- K League 1: Champions
- FA Cup: Runners-up
- Champions League (2023–24): Semi-final
- Champions League Elite (2024–25): League stage
Home colours	Away colours	Third colours

The 2024 season was Ulsan HD FC's 41st season in the K League 1, and the first season under the new name after rebranding from Ulsan Hyundai FC. Over the course of the season, the club participated in the 2024 K League 1, the 2024 Korean FA Cup, the 2023–24 AFC Champions League, and the 2024–25 AFC Champions League Elite.

== Players ==
No.	Name	Nationality	Date of birth (age)	Previous club	Contract since
Goalkeepers
1	Jo Su-Huk	(South Korea)	18 March 1987 (age 39)	(South Korea) Incheon United	2017
21	Jo Hyeon-woo	(South Korea)	25 September 1991 (age 35)	(South Korea) Daegu FC	2020
37	Moon Hyeon-ho	(South Korea)	13 May 2003 (age 23)	(South Korea) Chungnam Asan FC	2024
Defenders
2	Sim Sang-min	(South Korea)	21 May 1993 (age 33)	(South Korea) Pohang Steelers	2024
4	Kim Kee-hee	(South Korea)	13 July 1989 (age 37)	(United States) Seattle Sounders	2020
5	Lim Jong-eun	(South Korea)	18 June 1990 (age 36)	(South Korea) Jeonbuk Hyundai Motors	2018
13	Lee Myung-jae	(South Korea)	4 November 1993 (age 33)	(South Korea) Gimcheon Sangmu FC	2014
19	Kim Young-gwon	(South Korea)	27 February 1990 (age 36)	(Japan) Gamba Osaka	2022
20	Hwang Seok-ho	(South Korea)	27 June 1989 (age 37)	(Japan) Sagan Tosu	2024
23	Kim Ju-hwan	(South Korea)	17 February 2001 (age 25)	(South Korea) Cheonan City FC	2024
Midfielders
6	Darijan Bojanić	(Sweden)	28 December 1994 (age 31)	(Sweden) Hammarby	2023
7	Ko Seung-beom	(South Korea)	24 April 1994 (age 32)	(South Korea) Suwon Samsung Bluewings	2024
8	Lee Kyu-seong	(South Korea)	10 May 1994 (age 32)	(South Korea) Seongnam FC	2021
10	Kim Min-woo	(South Korea)	25 February 1990 (age 36)	(China) Chengdu Rongcheng	2024
17	Gustav Ludwigson	(Sweden)	20 October 1993 (age 33)	(Sweden) Hammarby	2023
22	Kim Min-hyeok	(South Korea)	16 August 1992 (age 34)	(South Korea) Seongnam FC	2022
31	Ataru Esaka	(Japan)	31 May 1992 (age 34)	(Japan) Urawa Red Diamonds	2023
32	Jung Woo-young	(South Korea)	14 December 1989 (age 36)	(Saudi Arabia) Al-Khaleej FC	2021
70	Choi Kang-min	(South Korea)	24 April 2002 (age 24)	(South Korea) Daegu Arts University	2024
95	Matheus Sales	(Brazil)	13 May 1995 (age 31)	(Brazil) Atlético Goianiense	2024
Forwards
9	Giorgi Arabidze	(Georgia (country))	4 March 1998 (age 28)	(Georgia (country)) FC Torpedo Kutaisi	2024
11	Um Won-sang	(South Korea)	6 January 1999 (age 27)	(South Korea) Gwangju FC	2022
18	Joo Min-kyu	(South Korea)	13 April 1990 (age 36)	(South Korea) Jeju United	2023
26	Kim Min-jun	(South Korea)	12 February 2000 (age 26)	(South Korea) Gimcheon Sangmu FC	2020
27	Lee Chung-yong	(South Korea)	2 July 1988 (age 38)	(Germany) VfL Bochum	2020
30	Kang Yun-gu	(South Korea)	8 April 2002 (age 24)	(South Korea) Busan IPark	2021
73	Yun Il-lok	(South Korea)	7 March 1992 (age 34)	(South Korea) Gangwon FC	2021
91	Park Chu-young	(South Korea)	10 July 1985 (age 41)	(South Korea) FC Seoul	2022
96	Kim Ji-hyeon	(South Korea)	22 July 1996 (age 30)	(South Korea) Gimcheon Sangmu FC	2021
99	Yago Cariello	(Brazil)	27 July 1999 (age 27)	(South Korea) Gangwon FC	2024
Players who left on loan during mid-season
3	Hong Jae-seok	(South Korea)	3 July 2003 (age 23)	(South Korea) Ulsan Citizen FC	2024
16	Lee Jae-wook	(South Korea)	9 March 2001 (age 25)	(South Korea) Yong In University	2023
24	Park Sang-jun	(South Korea)	19 November 2003 (age 23)	(South Korea) Ulsan University	2024
	Choi Seok-hyeon	(South Korea)	13 January 2003 (age 23)	(South Korea) Dankook University	2024
Players who left permanently during mid-season
9	Martin Ádám	(Hungary)	6 November 1994 (age 32)	(Hungary) Paksi FC	2020
66	Seol Young-woo	(South Korea)	5 December 1998 (age 27)	(South Korea) University of Ulsan	2020
82	Won Du-jae	(South Korea)	18 November 1997 (age 29)	(South Korea) Gimcheon Sangmu FC	2020
97	Kelvin	(Brazil)	18 August 1997 (age 29)	(Brazil) Atlético Goianiense	2024

== Transfers ==
=== Pre-season ===
==== In ====
Transfers in

Position	Player	Transferred from	Fee
GK	(South Korea) Moon Hyeon-ho	(South Korea) Chungnam Asan	Free transfer
DF	(South Korea) Hwang Seok-ho	(Japan) Sagan Tosu	Free transfer
DF	(South Korea) Sim Sang-min	(South Korea) Pohang Steelers	Free transfer
DF	(South Korea) Choi Seok-hyeon	(South Korea) Dankook University	Free transfer (Note: Choi Seok-hyeon signed and moved to Cheongju FC on loan for the season.)
DF	(South Korea) Hong Jae-seok	(South Korea) Ulsan Citizen	Free transfer (Note: Hong Jae-seok signed and moved to Jeju United on loan for the season.)
MF	(South Korea) Kim Min-woo	(China) Chengdu Rongcheng	Free transfer
MF	(South Korea) Ko Seung-beom	(South Korea) Suwon Samsung Bluewings	$600,000
MF	(South Korea) Kim Ju-hwan	(South Korea) Cheonan City	Free transfer
MF	(South Korea) Cho Young-kwang	(South Korea) Dongguk University	Free transfer
MF	(South Korea) Park Sang-jun	(South Korea) Ulsan University	Free transfer
MF	(South Korea) Choi Kang-min	(South Korea) Daegu Arts University	Free transfer
MF	(South Korea) Kim Dong-wook	(South Korea) Dankook University	Free transfer
MF	(Brazil) Matheus Sales	(Brazil) Atlético Goianiense	Free transfer
FW	(Brazil) Kelvin	(Brazil) Atlético Goianiense	R$1.5 million

Returned from loan

Position	Player	Returned from
DF	(South Korea) Kim Tae-hyeon	(Japan) Vegalta Sendai
DF	(South Korea) Kim Do-hyun	(South Korea) Chungbuk Cheongju
DF	(South Korea) Lee Sang-hyeok	(South Korea) Gimpo FC
MF	(South Korea) Oh In-pyo	(South Korea) Suwon FC
MF	(South Korea) Yun Il-lok	(South Korea) Gangwon FC

==== Out ====
Transfers out

Position	Player	Transferred to	Fee
GK	(South Korea) Seol Hyun-Bin	(South Korea) Bucheon FC 1995	Free transfer
GK	(South Korea) Min Dong-hwan		Free transfer
DF	(South Korea) Lee Sang-hyeok	(South Korea) Bucheon FC 1995	Free transfer
DF	(South Korea) Jung Seung-hyun	(Saudi Arabia) Al Wasl	Free transfer
DF	(South Korea) Kim Tae-hyeon	(Japan) Sagan Tosu	Free transfer
DF	(South Korea) Kim Tae-hwan	(South Korea) Jeonbuk Hyundai Motors	Free transfer
DF	(South Korea) Kim Do-hyun	(South Korea) Busan IPark	Free transfer
DF	(South Korea) Choi Seok-hyeon	(South Korea) Chungbuk Cheongju	Free transfer
MF	(South Korea) Kim Sung-joon	(South Korea) Cheonan City	Free transfer
MF	(South Korea) Oh In-pyo	(South Korea) Seoul E-Land	Free transfer
FW	(Georgia (country)) Valeri Qazaishvili	(China) Shandong Taishan	Free transfer

Loaned out

Position	Player	Loaned to	Note
MF	(South Korea) Cho Hyun-taek	(South Korea) Gimcheon Sangmu	Season-long loan
MF	(South Korea) Cho Young-kwang	(South Korea) Seoul E-Land	Season-long loan
MF	(South Korea) Hwang Jae-hwan	(South Korea) Bucheon FC 1995	Season-long loan
MF	(South Korea) Kim Dong-wook	(South Korea) Jeonnam Dragons	Season-long loan

=== Mid-season ===
==== In ====
Transfers in

Position	Player	Transferred from	Fee
DF	(South Korea) Jung Woo-young	(Saudi Arabia) Al-Khaleej	Free transfer
FW	(Georgia (country)) Giorgi Arabidze	(Georgia (country)) Torpedo Kutaisi	$400,000
FW	(Brazil) Yago Cariello	(Portugal) Portimonense	$1.9 million

Returned from loan

Position	Player	Returned from	Note
DF	(South Korea) Won Du-jae	(South Korea) Gimcheon Sangmu	End of military duty (Note: Won Du-jae returned from military duty, and then left for Khor Fakkan Club.)
FW	(South Korea) Kim Min-jun	(South Korea) Gimcheon Sangmu	End of military duty

==== Out ====
Transfers out

Position	Player	Transferred to	Fee
DF	(South Korea) Seol Young-woo	(Serbia) Red Star Belgrade	$1.63 million
FW	(South Korea) Won Du-jae	(United Arab Emirates) Khor Fakkan Club	Undisclosed
FW	(Brazil) Kelvin	(South Korea) Daejeon Hana Citizen	Undisclosed
FW	(Hungary) Martin Ádám	(Cyprus) Asteras Tripolis	Undisclosed

Loaned out

Position	Player	Loaned to	Note
DF	(South Korea) Hong Jae-seok	(South Korea) Jeju United	Season-long loan
MF	(South Korea) Lee Jae-wook	(South Korea) Suwon Samsung Bluewings	Season-long loan
MF	(South Korea) Park Sang-jun	(South Korea) Gyeongju KHNP	Season-long loan

== Competitions ==
=== K League 1 ===
Pos	Team	Pld	W	D	L	GF	GA	GD	Pts	Qualification or relegation (Note: Teams played each other three times (33 matches), before the league was split into two groups, the top six and the bottom six.)
1	Ulsan HD (C)	38	21	9	8	62	40	+22	72	Qualification for Champions League Elite league stage
2	Gangwon FC	38	19	7	12	62	56	+6	64	Qualification for Champions League Elite league stage
3	Gimcheon Sangmu (Note: Military-owned team Gimcheon Sangmu cannot qualify for AFC competitions.)	38	18	9	11	55	41	+14	63	
4	FC Seoul	38	16	10	12	55	42	+13	58	Qualification for Champions League Elite league stage
5	Suwon FC	38	15	8	15	54	57	−3	53	

Source: Soccerway K League
Rules for classification: 1) Points; 2) Goals scored; 3) Goal difference; 4) Wins; 5) Head-to-head points
(C) Champions

==== Matches ====
As usual, the league season was played over 38 matches. After 33 league matches between the 12 participating teams, the teams were split into the final round (top 6 teams) and relegation round (bottom 6 teams).

1 March 2024 1	Ulsan HD	1–0	Pohang Steelers	Ulsan
	Esaka 51'	Report		Stadium: Ulsan Munsu Football Stadium; Attendance: 28,683; Referee: Kim Woo-sung

9 March 2024 2	Gimcheon Sangmu FC	2–3	Ulsan HD	Gimcheon
	Kim Hyeon-ug 58', 61'	Report	Lee Dong-gyeong 17', 26'; Jang Si-young 29'	Stadium: Gimcheon Stadium; Attendance: 5,852; Referee: Kim Yong-woo

17 March 2024 3	Ulsan HD	3–3	Incheon United	Ulsan
	Ádám 33', 63'; Lee Dong-gyeong 54'	Report	Mugoša 38', 75' (pen.); Park Seung-ho 49'	Stadium: Ulsan Munsu Football Stadium; Attendance: 15,233

30 March 2024 4	Jeonbuk Hyundai Motors	2–2	Ulsan HD	Jeonju
	Lee Dong-jun 45+2'; Moon Seon-min 70'	Report	Lee Dong-gyeong 22'; Kim Ji-hyeon 40'	Stadium: Jeonju World Cup Stadium; Attendance: 25,782; Referee: Lee Dong-jun

2 April 2024 5	Daejeon Hana Citizen	2–0	Ulsan HD	Daejeon
	Leandro Ribeiro 48'; Kim In-gyun 60'	Report		Stadium: Daejeon World Cup Stadium; Attendance: 7,927; Referee: Ko Hyung-jin

6 April 2024 6	Ulsan HD	3–0	Suwon FC	Ulsan
	Lee Dong-gyeong 18'; Ludwigson 64'; Joo Min-kyu 90+6'	Report		Stadium: Ulsan Munsu Football Stadium; Attendance: 14,215; Referee: Chae Sang-hyeop

13 April 2024 7	Ulsan HD	4–0	Gangwon FC	Ulsan
	Joo Min-kyu 9', 61'; Lee Dong-gyeong 43'; Um Won-sang 55'	Report		Stadium: Ulsan Munsu Football Stadium; Attendance: 13,874; Referee: Kim Dae-young

28 April 2024 8	Ulsan HD	3–1	Jeju United	Ulsan
	Kelvin 57'; Lee Dong-gyeong 43'; Um Won-sang 55'	Report	Kim Tae-hwan 56'	Stadium: Ulsan Munsu Football Stadium; Attendance: 20,253; Referee: Kim Chong-hyuk

1 May 2024 9	Daegu FC	1–2	Ulsan HD	Daegu
	Park Yong-hui 34'	Report	Kang Yun-gu 42'; Choi Kang-min 82'	Stadium: DGB Daegu Bank Park; Attendance: 11,466; Referee: Ko Hyung-jin

4 May 2024 10	FC Seoul	0–1	Ulsan HD	Seoul
		Report	Ádám 90+2' (pen.)	Stadium: Seoul World Cup Stadium; Attendance: 52,600; Referee: Kim Hee-gon

12 May 2024 11	Ulsan HD	2–2	Gimcheon Sangmu	Ulsan
	Ludwigson 3'; Kim Young-gwon 52'	Report	Kim Dae-won 30' (pen.); Kim Tae-hyeon 90+5'	Stadium: Ulsan Munsu Football Stadium; Attendance: 16,394; Referee: Park Byung-jin

15 May 2024 12	Gwangju FC	2–1	Ulsan HD	Gwangju
	Park Tae-jun 59'; Lee Kang-hyun 82'	Report	Um Won-sang 85'	Stadium: Gwangju Football Stadium; Attendance: 8,069; Referee: Lee Dong-jun

19 May 2024 13	Gangwon FC	1–0	Ulsan HD	Chuncheon
	Cariello 66'	Report		Stadium: Chuncheon Songam Sports Town; Attendance: 7,850; Referee: Chae Sang-hyeop

25 May 2024 14	Ulsan HD	4–1	Daejeon Hana Citizen	Ulsan
	Kim Min-woo 36'; Ludwigson 65', 76'; Joo Min-kyu 90'	Report	Lim Dug-keun 70'	Stadium: Ulsan Munsu Football Stadium; Attendance: 14,676; Referee: Kim Yong-wo

29 May 2024 15	Incheon United FC	1–1	Ulsan HD	Incheon
	M'Poku 49'	Report	Um Won-sang 82'	Stadium: Incheon Football Stadium; Attendance: 8,413; Referee: Shin Yong-jun

1 June 2024 16	Ulsan HD	1–0	Jeonbuk Hyundai Motors	Ulsan
	Esaka 90+4'	Report		Stadium: Ulsan Munsu Football Stadium; Attendance: 29,007; Referee: Ko Hyung-jin

16 June 2024 17	Ulsan HD	2–2	FC Seoul	Ulsan
	Joo Min-kyu 2'; Lee Tae-seok 43' (o.g.)	Report	Iljutcenko 52', 77'	Stadium: Ulsan Munsu Football Stadium; Attendance: 23,856; Referee: Kim Chong-hyuk

23 June 2024 18	Jeju United	2–3	Ulsan HD	Seogwipo
	Reis 22', 77' (pen.)	Report	Joo Min-kyu 45+3', 83'; Kim Min-woo 63'	Stadium: Jeju World Cup Stadium; Attendance: 6,557; Referee: Kim Yong-woo

26 June 2024 19	Ulsan HD	1–0	Daegu FC	Ulsan
	Bojanić 38'	Report		Stadium: Ulsan Munsu Football Stadium; Attendance: 10,273; Referee: Park Byung-jin

30 June 2024 20	Pohang Steelers	2–1	Ulsan HD	Pohang
	Hong Yun-sang 2'; Lee Ho-jae 19' (pen.)	Report	Ko Seung-beom 25'	Stadium: Pohang Steel Yard; Attendance: 13,079; Referee: Ko Hyung-jin

5 July 2024 21	Suwon FC	1–1	Ulsan HD	Suwon
	Kang Sang-woon 73'	Report	Esaka 61'	Stadium: Suwon Sports Complex; Attendance: 7,378; Referee: Kim Yong-woo

10 July 2024 22	Ulsan HD	0–1	Gwangju FC	Ulsan
		Report	Lee Hui-gyun 66'	Stadium: Ulsan Munsu Football Stadium; Attendance: 9,444; Referee: Shin Yong-jun

13 July 2024 23	Ulsan HD	1–0	FC Seoul	Ulsan
	Joo Min-kyu 90+2'	Report		Stadium: Ulsan Munsu Football Stadium; Attendance: 21,064; Referee: Kim Woo-sung

20 July 2024 24	Jeonbuk Hyundai Motors	2–0	Ulsan HD	Jeonju
	Tiago Orobó 79'; Andrigo 90+9'	Report		Stadium: Jeonju World Cup Stadium; Attendance: 18,573; Referee: Kim Dae-young

26 July 2024 25	Jeju United	1–0	Ulsan HD	Seogwipo
	Hong Joon-ho 90+2'	Report		Stadium: Jeju World Cup Stadium; Attendance: 7,346; Referee: Kim Hee-gon

10 August 2024 26	Ulsan HD	1–0	Daegu FC	Ulsan
	Go Myeong-seok 30' (o.g.)	Report		Stadium: Ulsan Munsu Football Stadium; Attendance: 17,372; Referee: Lee Dong-jun

18 August 2024 27	Ulsan HD	1–2	Suwon FC	Ulsan
	Ludwigson 72'	Report	Sun Jun-ho 42'; Anderson Oliveira 55'	Stadium: Ulsan Munsu Football Stadium; Attendance: 13,204; Referee: Ko Hyung-jin

25 August 2024 28	Gwangju FC	0–1	Ulsan HD	Gwangju
		Report	Cariello 87'	Stadium: Gwangju Football Stadium; Attendance: 5,081; Referee: Chae Sang-hyeop

31 August 2024 29	Ulsan HD	5–4	Pohang Steelers	Ulsan
	Arabidze 5', 36'; Cariello 57'; Ludwigson 78'; Kim Young-gwon 87'	Report	Hong Yun-sang 9'; Jorge Luiz 83'; Eo Jeong-won 89'; Lee Tae-seok 90+2'	Stadium: Ulsan Munsu Football Stadium; Attendance: 22,106; Referee: Kim Hee-gon

13 September 2024 30	Ulsan HD	2–0	Gangwon FC	Ulsan
	Kang Yun-gu 15'; Esaka 79'	Report		Stadium: Ulsan Munsu Football Stadium; Attendance: 22,010; Referee: Park Byung-jin

22 September 2024 31	Incheon United FC	0–0	Ulsan HD	Incheon
		Report		Stadium: Incheon Football Stadium; Attendance: 13,888; Referee: Shin Yong-jun

27 September 2024 32	Daejeon Hana Citizen	0–1	Ulsan HD	Daejeon
		Report	Bojanić 19' (pen.)	Stadium: Daejeon World Cup Stadium; Attendance: 11,219; Referee: Chae Sang-hyeop

6 October 2024 33	Ulsan HD	2–1	Gimcheon Sangmu	Ulsan
	Ko Seung-beom 76'; Cariello 80'	Report	Mo Jae-hyeon 22'	Stadium: Ulsan Munsu Football Stadium; Attendance: 24,417; Referee: Kim Chong-hyuk

19 October 2024 34	Gimcheon Sangmu FC	0–0	Ulsan HD	Gimcheon
		Report		Stadium: Gimcheon Stadium; Attendance: 5,636; Referee: Chae Sang-hyeop

27 October 2024 35	Pohang Steelers	0–2	Ulsan HD	Pohang
		Report	Ko Seung-beom 33'; Joo Min-kyu 65'	Stadium: Pohang Steel Yard; Attendance: 13,212; Referee: Kim Chong-hyuk

1 November 2024 36	Ulsan HD	2–1	Gangwon FC	Ulsan
	Ludwigson 36'; Joo Min-kyu 54'	Report	Lee Sang-heon 65'	Stadium: Ulsan Munsu Football Stadium; Attendance: 13,438; Referee: Ko Hyung-jin

10 November 2024 37	FC Seoul	1–1	Ulsan HD	Seoul
	Lingard 51'	Report	Ko Seung-beom 45+2'	Stadium: Seoul World Cup Stadium; Attendance: 37,288; Referee: Kim Woo-sung

23 November 2024 38	Ulsan HD	4–2	Suwon FC	Ulsan
	Cariello 4' (pen.); Kim Min-jun 52'; Esaka 84'; Park Chu-young 89'	Report	Jeong Seung-won 42', 63'	Stadium: Ulsan Munsu Football Stadium; Attendance: 24,096; Referee: Lee Dong-jun

=== Korean FA Cup ===
19 June 2024 Round of 16	Ulsan HD	4–4 (a.e.t.) (3–0 p)	Gyeongnam FC	Ulsan
19:00 UTC+9				Stadium: Ulsan Munsu Football Stadium

17 July 2024 Quarter-final	Ulsan HD	1–0	Incheon United	Ulsan
19:00 UTC+9	Kim Min-jun 27'			Stadium: Ulsan Munsu Football Stadium; Attendance: 4.498; Referee: Kim Jong-hyeok

21 August 2024 Semi-final first leg	Gwangju FC	0–1	Ulsan HD	Gwangju
19:00 UTC+9			Cariello 55'	Stadium: Gwangju Football Stadium; Attendance: 1,500; Referee: Park Byeong-jin

28 August 2024 Semi-final second leg	Ulsan HD	2–2 (3–2 agg.)	Gwangju FC	Ulsan
19:00 UTC+9	Lim Jong-eun 13'; Matheus Sales 54'		Oh Hu-seong 47', 90'	Stadium: Ulsan Munsu Football Stadium; Attendance: 5,201; Referee: Shin Yong-jun

30 November 2024 Final	Pohang Steelers	3–1 (a.e.t.)	Ulsan HD	Seoul World Cup Stadium, Seoul
15:00 UTC+9	Jeong Jae-hee 69'; Kim In-sung 112'; Kang Hyeon-je 120+5'	Report	Joo Min-kyu 38'	Attendance: 27,184; Referee: Kim Young-woo

=== 2023–24 AFC Champions League ===
==== Knockout stage ====
15 February 2024 Round of 16 first leg	Ulsan HD (South Korea)	3–0	(Japan) Ventforet Kofu	Ulsan, South Korea
19:00 UTC+9	Joo Min-kyu 37', 45' (pen.); Seol Young-woo 61'	Report		Stadium: Ulsan Munsu Football Stadium; Attendance: 7,621; Referee: Omar Mohamed Al Ali (United Arab Emirates)

21 February 2024 Round of 16 second leg	Ventforet Kofu (Japan)	1–2 (1–5 agg.)	(South Korea) Ulsan HD	Tokyo, Japan
18:00 UTC+9	Mitsuhira 88'	Report	Kim Ji-hyeon 11'; Joo Min-kyu 90+4'	Stadium: Japan National Stadium (Note: To comply with the AFC requirements, Ventforet Kofu played at the Japan National Stadium instead of their home ground.); Attendance: 15,932; Referee: Moood Bonyadifard (Iran)

5 March 2024 Quarter-final first leg	Jeonbuk Hyundai Motors (South Korea)	1–1	(South Korea) Ulsan HD	Jeonju, South Korea
19:00 UTC+7	Song Min-kyu 4'; Tiago Orobó (penalty missed) 25; Moon Seon-min (yellow card) 42'		Lee Myung-jae 77' (yellow card) 22'	Stadium: Jeonju World Cup Stadium; Attendance: 9,338; Referee: Adel Al Naqbi (United Arab Emirates)

12 March 2024 Quarter-final second leg	Ulsan HD (South Korea)	1–0 (2–1 agg.)	(South Korea) Jeonbuk Hyundai Motors	Ulsan, South Korea
19.00 UTC+7	Seol Young-woo 45+2'	Report		Stadium: Ulsan Munsu Football Stadium; Referee: Alireza Faghani (Iran)

17 April 2024 Semi-final first leg	Ulsan HD (South Korea)	1–0	(Japan) Yokohama F. Marinos	Ulsan, South Korea
19:00 UTC+9	Lee Dong-gyeong 19'	Report		Stadium: Ulsan Munsu Football Stadium; Attendance: 9,558; Referee: Ahmed Al-Kaf (Oman)

24 April 2024 Semi-final second leg	Yokohama F. Marinos (Japan)	3–2 (a.e.t.) (3–3 agg.) (5–4 p)	(South Korea) Ulsan HD	Yokohama, Japan
19:00 UTC+9	Uenaka 13', 30'; Anderson Lopes 21'	Report	Matheus Sales 35'; Bojanić 42' (pen.)	Stadium: Nissan Stadium; Attendance: 16,098; Referee: Alireza Faghani (Australia)
	Penalties
	Anderson Lopes (penalty scored); Mizunuma (penalty scored); Matsubara (penalty scored); Amano (penalty scored); Eduardo (penalty scored)		(penalty scored) Ádám; (penalty scored) Kelvin; (penalty scored) Ko Seung-beom; (penalty scored) Lee Chung-yong; (penalty missed) Kim Min-woo

=== 2024–25 AFC Champions League Elite ===
Pos	Team	Pld	W	D	L	GF	GA	GD	Pts	Qualification
8	(China) Shanghai Port	8	2	2	4	10	18	−8	8	Advance to round of 16
9	(South Korea) Pohang Steelers	7	2	0	5	9	17	−8	6	
10	(South Korea) Ulsan HD	7	1	0	6	4	16	−12	3	
11	(Australia) Central Coast Mariners	7	0	1	6	8	18	−10	1	
12	(China) Shandong Taishan	0	0	0	0	0	0	0	0	Withdrawn, record expunged (Note: Shandong Taishan were considered to have withdrawn from the AFC Champions League Elite after the club confirmed that it did not intend to report for their league stage match against Ulsan HD on 19 February 2025. Their remaining fixture was cancelled, with their seven played matches being expunged.)

Source: Asian Football Confederation
Rules for classification: 1) points; 2) goal difference; 3) number of goals scored; 4) number of matches won; 5) penalty shoot-out if only two teams remain tied and played each other on the final matchday 6) fair play ranking; 7) drawing of lots
Notes:

Win Draw Loss

==== League stage ====
18 September 2024 1	Ulsan HD (South Korea)	0–1	(Japan) Kawasaki Frontale	Ulsan, South Korea
19:00 UTC+9		Report	Marcinho 54'	Stadium: Ulsan Munsu Football Stadium; Attendance: 9,673; Referee: Omar Mohamed Al-Ali (United Arab Emirates)

2 October 2024 2	Yokohama F. Marinos (Japan)	4–0	(South Korea) Ulsan HD	Yokohama, Japan
19:00 UTC+9	Watanabe 4' (pen.); Nishimura 44'; Lopes 83'; Mizunuma 90+2'	Report		Stadium: International Stadium Yokohama; Attendance: 8,153; Referee: Mohammed Al Hoaish (Saudi Arabia)

22 October 2024 3	Ulsan HD (South Korea)	0–2	(Japan) Vissel Kobe	Ulsan, South Korea
19:00 UTC+9		Report	Taisei Miyashiro 48', 73'	Stadium: Ulsan Munsu Football Stadium; Attendance: 5,371; Referee: Alireza Faghani (Iran)

5 November 2024 4	Johor Darul Ta'zim (Malaysia)	3–0	(South Korea) Ulsan HD	Iskandar Puteri, Malaysia
19:00 UTC+8	Arif Aiman 9'; Óscar Arribas 68'; Bérgson 88'	Report		Stadium: Sultan Ibrahim Stadium; Attendance: 34,236; Referee: Adham Makhadmeh (Jordan)

26 November 2024 5	Ulsan HD (South Korea)	1–3	(China) Shanghai Port	Ulsan, South Korea
19:00 UTC+9	Joo Min-kyu 73'	Report	Vargas 11', 23', 83'	Stadium: Ulsan Munsu Football Stadium; Attendance: 3,121; Referee: Nazmi Nasaruddin (Malaysia)

4 December 2024 6	Shanghai Shenhua (China)	1–2	(South Korea) Ulsan HD	Shanghai, China
19:00 UTC+8	André Luis 23'	Report	Cariello 58' (pen.); Kang Min-woo 66'	Stadium: Shanghai Stadium; Attendance: 26,191; Referee: Salman Ahmad Falahi (Qatar)

== Team statistics ==
=== Appearances and goals ===
No.	Pos.	Player	K League		FA Cup		AFC Champions League 2023–24 ACL		AFC Champions League Elite 2024–25 ACL Elite		Total	
No.	Pos.	Player	Apps.	Goals	Apps.	Goals	Apps.	Goals	Apps.	Goals	Apps.	Goals
1	GK	(South Korea) Jo Su-huk	0	0	0	0	0	0	1	0	1	0
2	DF	(South Korea) Sim Sang-min	9	0	1	0	0	0	3	0	13	0
4	DF	(South Korea) Kim Kee-hee	22	0	1+2	0	2	0	1	0	28	0
5	DF	(South Korea) Lim Jong-eun	20+4	0	4+1	1	0+1	0	3+1	0	34	1
6	MF	(Sweden) Darijan Bojanić	22+4	2	2+1	0	0+1	0	2	0	32	2
7	MF	(South Korea) Ko Seung-beom	25+3	4	3	0	5+1	0	3+2	0	42	4
8	MF	(South Korea) Lee Kyu-seong	14+11	0	3	0	4+3	0	4+1	0	40	0
9	FW	(Georgia (country)) Giorgi Arabidze	5+2	2	0+1	0	0	0	2+3	0	13	2
10	MF	(South Korea) Kim Min-woo	11+8	2	3	1	1+4	0	3+1	0	31	3
11	FW	(South Korea) Um Won-sang	12+14	4	2+1	1	5	0	0	0	34	5
13	DF	(South Korea) Lee Myung-jae	27+1	0	3+1	0	6	1	2+2	0	42	1
17	MF	(Sweden) Gustav Ludwigson	17+5	7	2	0	4+1	0	2+3	0	34	7
18	FW	(South Korea) Joo Min-kyu	26+7	10	2+2	1	5+1	2	3+2	1	48	14
19	DF	(South Korea) Kim Young-gwon	20+1	1	2+1	0	5+1	0	4	0	34	1
20	DF	(South Korea) Hwang Seok-ho	12+5	0	1+1	0	5+1	0	3+2	0	30	0
21	GK	(South Korea) Jo Hyeon-woo	38	0	4	0	6	0	5	0	53	0
22	MF	(South Korea) Kim Min-hyeok	7+6	0	3	0	0+2	0	0	0	18	0
23	DF	(South Korea) Kim Ju-hwan	2	0	0	0	0	0	0	0	2	0
26	FW	(South Korea) Kim Min-jun	3+3	1	1+1	1	0	0	2+2	0	12	2
27	FW	(South Korea) Lee Chung-yong	7+16	0	2+2	1	0+2	0	2+3	0	34	1
28	FW	(South Korea) Jang Si-young	9+9	1	0+2	0	0	0	1+1	0	22	1
30	MF	(South Korea) Kang Yun-gu	20	2	0	0	0	0	0	0	20	2
31	MF	(Japan) Ataru Esaka	9+20	5	0+4	1	2+2	0	4+2	0	43	6
32	FW	(South Korea) Jung Woo-young	4+4	0	2+1	0	0	0	2	0	13	0
33	DF	(South Korea) Kang Min-woo	3+2	0	1	0	0	0	1	1	7	1
37	GK	(South Korea) Moon Hyun-ho	0	0	1	0	0	0	0	0	1	0
70	FW	(South Korea) Choi Kang-min	8+13	1	3	0	0	0	0	0	24	1
73	FW	(South Korea) Yun Il-lok	21+5	0	2+1	1	0	0	6	0	35	1
91	FW	(South Korea) Park Chu-young	0+2	1	0	0	0	0	0	0	2	1
95	MF	(Brazil) Matheus Sales	6+6	0	1	1	1+4	1	3	0	20	2
96	FW	(South Korea) Kim Ji-hyeon	4+6	1	0+1	0	0+3	1	0	0	14	2
99	FW	(Brazil) Yago Cariello	5+7	4	2+1	1	0	0	3+2	1	20	6
Players featured on a match but left the club mid-season on loan transfer
3	DF	(South Korea) Hong Jae-seok	0+2	0	1	0	0	0	0	0	3	0
24	DF	(South Korea) Park Sang-jun	0	0	1	0	0	0	0	0	0	0
16	MF	(South Korea) Lee Jae-wook	0	0	1	0	0	0	0	0	2	0
Players featured on a match but left the club mid-season permanently
9	FW	(Hungary) Martin Ádám	6+4	3	0	0	4+1	0	0	0	15	3
14	FW	(South Korea) Lee Dong-gyeong	7+1	7	0	0	4+2	1	0	0	0	0
66	DF	(South Korea) Seol Young-woo	7+2	0	0	0	6	2	0	0	15	2
82	MF	(South Korea) Won Du-jae	3+2	0	0+2	0	0	0	0	0	7	0
97	FW	(Brazil) Kelvin	6+4	2	2	0	0+2	0	0	0	14	2
