= 2020 Hammarby Fotboll season =

Swedish football team

Hammarby Fotboll
2020 season
- Chairman: Richard von Yxkull
- Head coach: Stefan Billborn
- Stadium: Tele2 Arena
- Allsvenskan: 8th
- 2019–20 Svenska Cupen: Quarter final
- Europa League: Second qualifying round
- Top goalscorer: League: Aron Jóhannsson (12); All: Aron Jóhannsson (15)
- Highest home attendance: 14 518 (24 February vs Varbergs BoIS, Svenska Cupen)
Home colours	Away colours

The 2020 season was Hammarby Fotboll's 105th in existence, their 51st season in Allsvenskan and their 6th consecutive season in the league. They competed in Allsvenskan, Svenska Cupen and Europa League during the year. League play was planned to start in early April, but was postponed until June due to concerns over the coronavirus pandemic. Stefan Billborn made his third season as manager.

== Summary ==
In a season postponed due to the COVID-19 pandemic, the side disappointedly finished 8th in the Allsvenskan table. The club won 3–0 against Puskás Akadémia in the first round of the 2020–21 UEFA Europa League, but was eliminated from the tournament in the second round against Lech Poznań through a 0–3 loss.

== Players ==
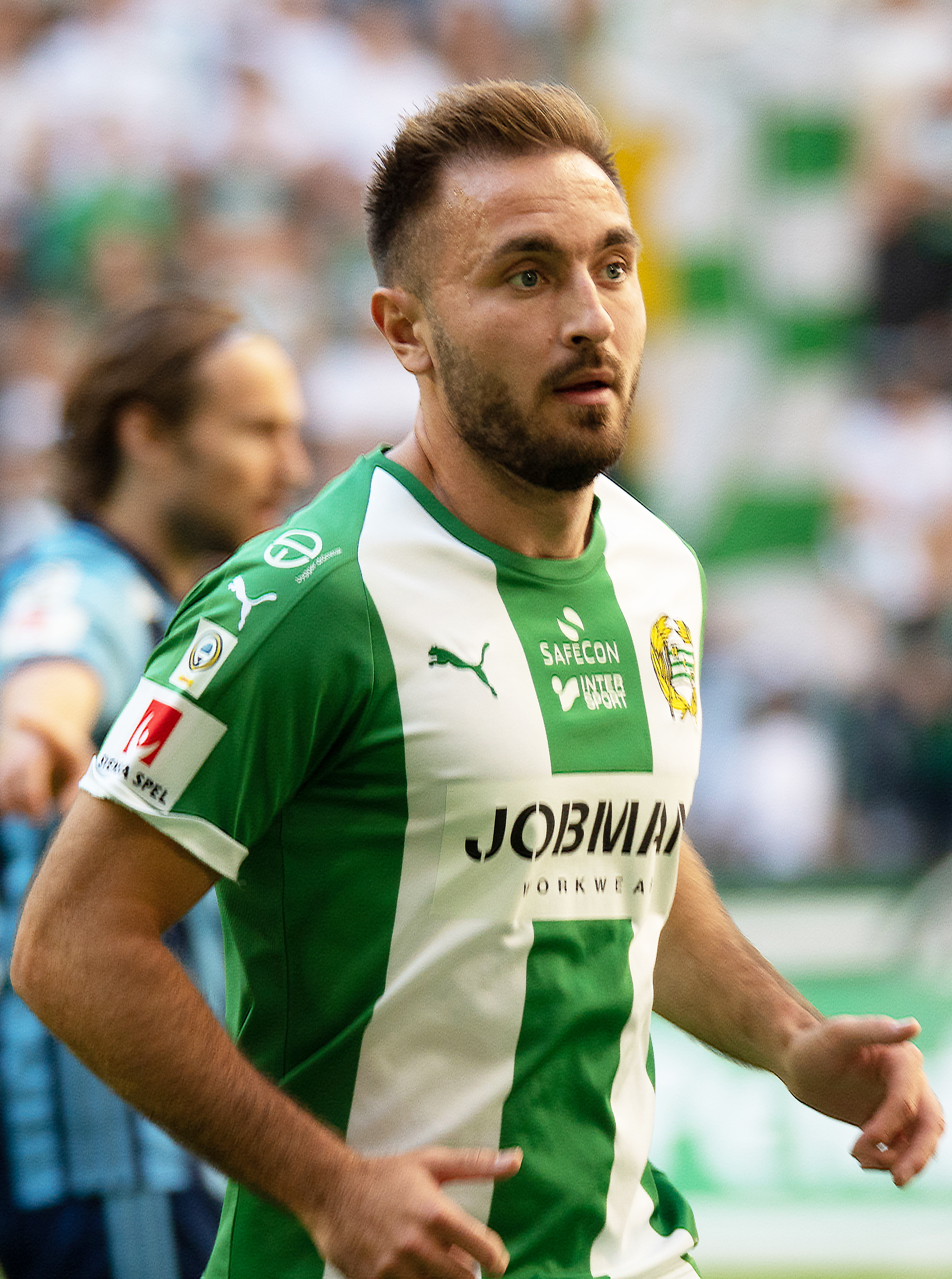
Muamer Tanković was the league top scorer at Hammarby in 2019.

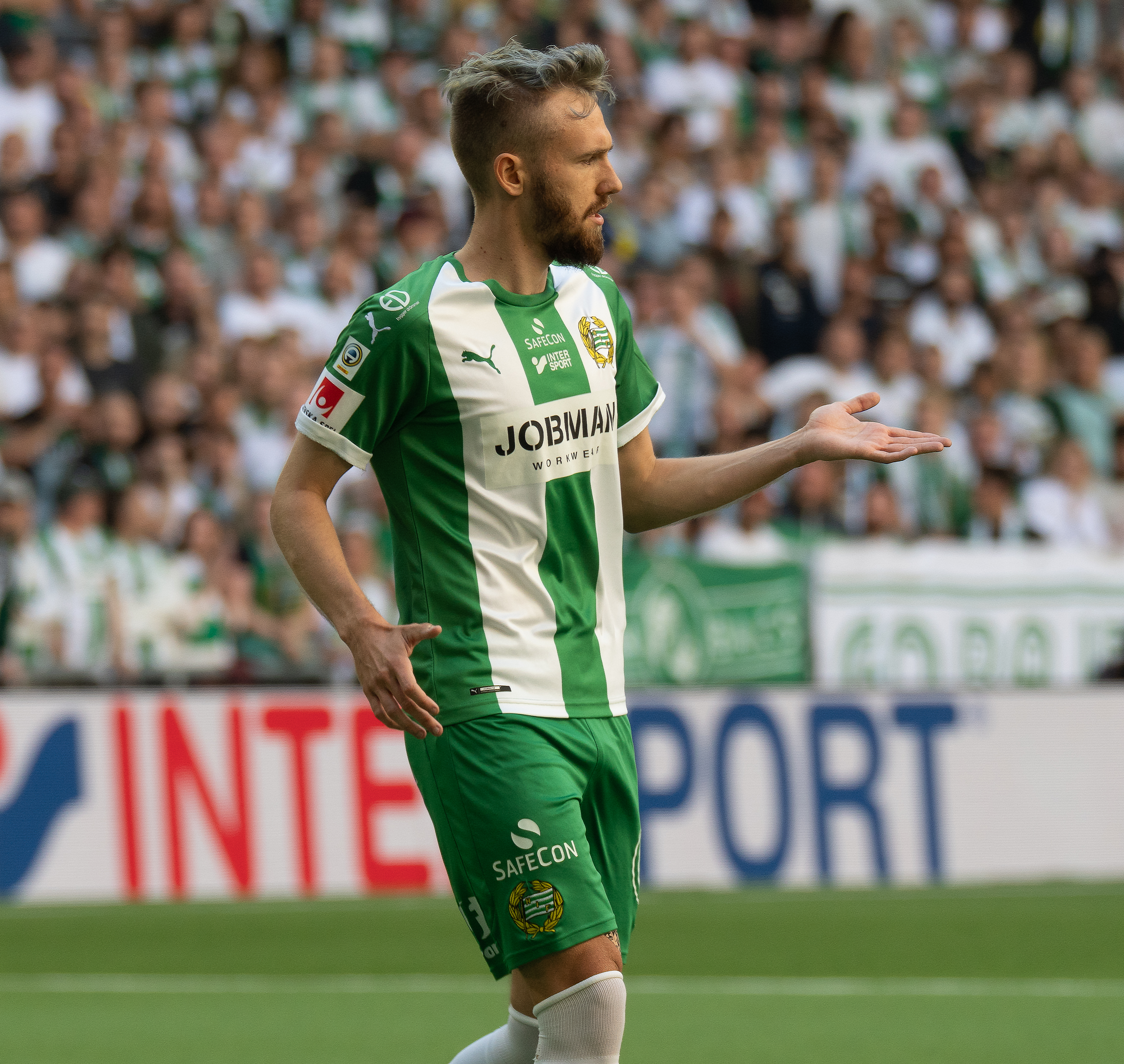
Simon Sandberg was nominated as Allsvenskan "defender of the year" in 2019.

=== Squad information ===
N	Pos.	Nat.	Name	Age	Since	App	Goals	Ends	Transfer fee	Notes
1	GK	(Denmark)	David Ousted	35	2020	25	0	2020	Free	
2	DF	(Sweden)	Simon Sandberg	26	2018	71	0	2022	Free	
3	DF	(Sweden)	Dennis Widgren	26	2019	43	0	2022 (June)	Free	
4	DF	(Sweden)	Richard Magyar	29	2019	70	4	2022 (June)	Free	
5	DF	(Sweden)	David Fällman (vice captain)	30	2018	70	1	2021 (June)	Free	
6	MF	(Sweden)	Darijan Bojanić	26	2019	52	4	2023 (June)	Free	
7	MF	(Sweden)	Imad Khalili	33	2015	100	16	2021 (June)	Free	
8	MF	(Denmark)	Jeppe Andersen (captain)	28	2017	95	3	2023 (June)	Free	
9	MF	(Brazil)	Paulinho	34	2020	16	3	2021	Free	
11	MF	(Montenegro)	Vladimir Rodić	27	2018	52	9	2021	Undisclosed	On loan to Odds BK
13	DF	(Denmark)	Mads Fenger	30	2017	80	4	2023	Free	
14	MF	(Sweden)	Tim Söderström	26	2019	42	1	2021 (June)	Free	
15	DF	(Sweden)	Hjalmar Ekdal	22	2019	0	0	2021 (June)	Undisclosed	On loan to IK Sirius
16	FW	(Sweden)	Gustav Ludwigson	27	2020	29	9	2022	Undisclosed	
17	MF	(Sweden)	Abdul Khalili	28	2020	27	2	2021	Free	
18	FW	(Sweden)	Filston Mawana	20	2019	0	0	2021	Undisclosed	On loan to IK Frej (Note: Hammarby IF have a cooperation with IK Frej and might temporarily loan out players during the season and recall them without further notice.)
19	MF	(Gabon)	Serge-Junior Martinsson Ngouali	28	2017	73	3	2020	Undisclosed	
20	MF	(Sweden)	Alexander Kačaniklić	29	2019	48	14	2021	Free	
21	DF	(Sweden)	Oscar Krusnell	21	2017	5	0	2020	Undisclosed	On loan to IK Frej
23	FW	(United States)	Aron Jóhannsson	30	2019	32	12	2022 (July)	Free	
24	GK	(Sweden)	Oliver Nnonyelu Dovin	18	2019	1	0	2021	Youth system	On loan to IK Frej
25	GK	(Sweden)	Davor Blažević	27	2018	22	0	2022	Free	
26	DF	(Sweden)	Kalle Björklund	21	2019	14	1	2021 (June)	Free	
28	DF	(Brazil)	Jean	25	2019	5	0	2021	Undisclosed	On loan to Turun Palloseura
30	DF	(Iraq)	Mohanad Jeahze	23	2020	8	0	2023	Undisclosed	
31	MF	(Sweden)	Aimar Sher	18	2019	22	1	2022	Youth system	
33	MF	(Nigeria)	Akinkunmi Amoo	18	2020	6	0	2024 (July)	Undisclosed	
35	DF	(Sweden)	Axel Sjöberg	20	2020	1	0	2021	Free	
–	MF	(Ghana)	Abdul Halik Hudu	20	2018	0	0	2022 (July)	Undisclosed	On loan to GIF Sundsvall

- Last updated: 14 December 2020
- Source: Hammarby Fotboll and players' Wikipedia articles
- Ordered by squad number.

=== Transfers ===
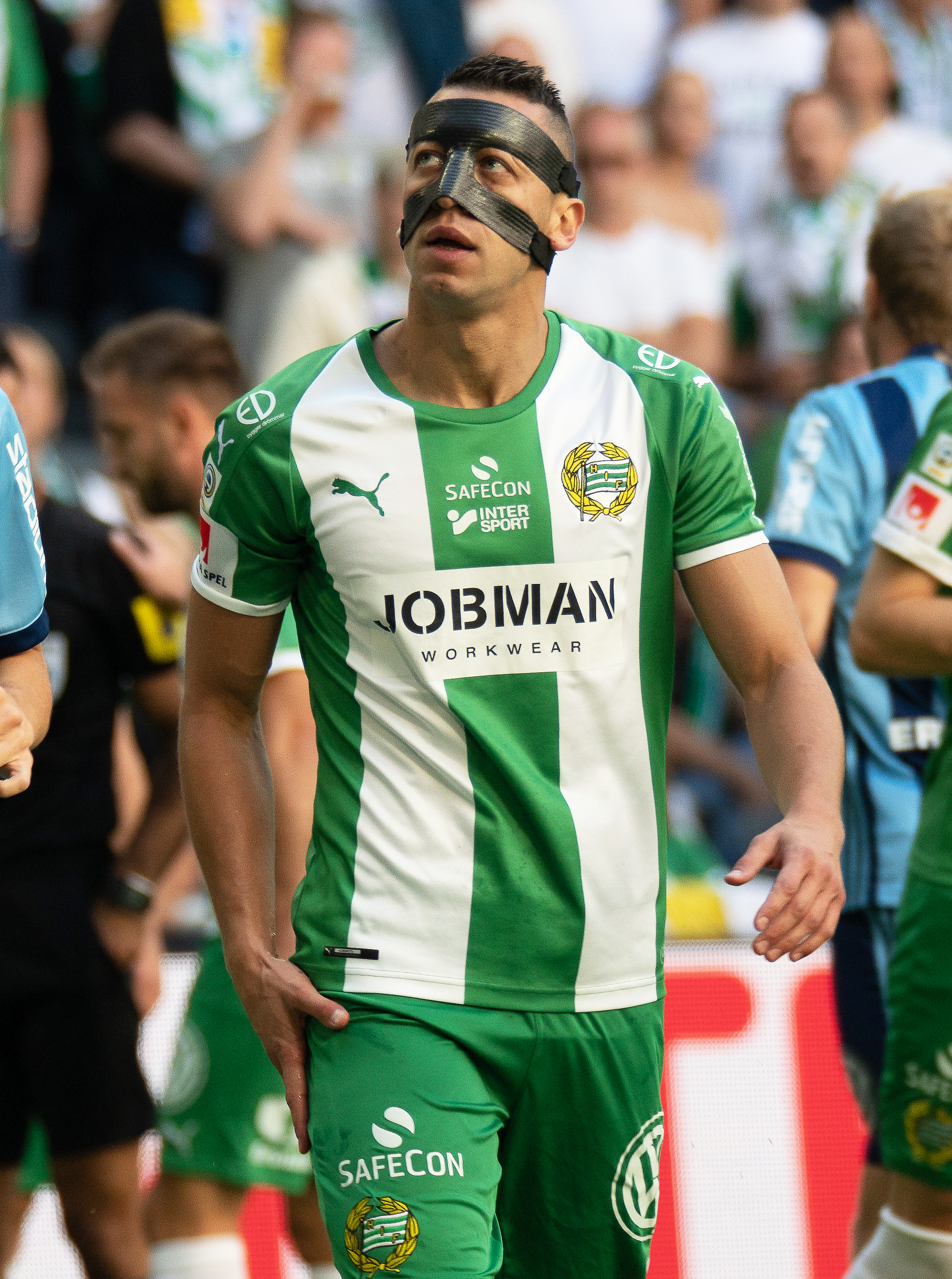
Nikola Đurđić was voted as "forward of the season" in Allsvenskan 2019, but left the club after the season.

==== In ====
No.	Pos.	Nat.	Name	Age	Moving from	Type	Transfer window	Ends	Transfer fee	Source
16	FW	(Sweden)	Gustav Ludwigson	26	Örgryte IS	Transfer	Winter	2022	Undisclosed	hammarbyfotboll.se
9	FW	(Brazil)	Paulinho	33	Hapoel Be'er Sheva (Israel)	Bosman	Winter	2021	Free	hammarbyfotboll.se
1	GK	(Denmark)	David Ousted	35	Chicago Fire (United States)	Bosman	Winter	2020	Free	hammarbyfotboll.se
17	MF	(Sweden)	Abdul Khalili	27	Kasımpaşa (Turkey)	Bosman	Winter	2021	Free	hammarbyfotboll.se
33	MF	(Nigeria)	Akinkunmi Amoo	18	Sidos F.C. (Nigeria)	Transfer	Summer	2024 (June)	Undisclosed	hammarbyfotboll.se
33	MF	(Sweden)	Axel Sjöberg	20	IK Frej	Transfer	Summer	2021	Free	hammarbyfotboll.se
30	DF	(Iraq)	Mohanad Jeahze	23	Mjällby AIF	Transfer	Summer	2023	Undisclosed	hammarbyfotboll.se

==== Out ====
No.	Pos.	Nat.	Name	Age	Moving to	Type	Transfer window	Transfer fee	Source
77	DF	(Norway)	Mats Solheim	31	(Norway) Stabæk	End of contract	Winter	Free	hammarbyfotboll.se
16	MF	(Sweden)	Leo Bengtsson	21	BK Häcken	Transfer	Winter	Undisclosed	hammarbyfotboll.se
40	FW	(Serbia)	Nikola Đurđić	33	(China) Chengdu	Transfer	Winter	Undisclosed	hammarbyfotboll.se
1	GK	(Sweden)	Johan Wiland	39	Retired	End of contract	Winter	Free	hammarbyfotboll.se
23	DF	(Sweden)	Marcus Degerlund	21	Jönköpings Södra	Transfer	Winter	Undisclosed	hammarbyfotboll.se
–	MF	(Ghana)	Abdul Halik Hudu	20	GIF Sundsvall	Loan	Summer	Loan	hammarbyfotboll.se
34	FW	(Sweden)	Emil Roback	17	(Italy) Milan	Transfer	Summer	Undisclosed	hammarbyfotboll.se
28	DF	(Brazil)	Jean	25	(Finland) Turun Palloseura	Loan	Summer	Loan	hammarbyfotboll.se
11	MF	(Montenegro)	Vladimir Rodić	27	(Norway) Odds BK	Loan	Summer	Loan	hammarbyfotboll.se
22	FW	(Sweden)	Muamer Tanković	25	(Greece) AEK Athens	Transfer	Summer	Free	hammarbyfotboll.se

== Player statistics ==
=== Appearances and goals ===
No.	Pos	Nat	Player	Total		Allsvenskan		2019–20 and 2020–21 Svenska Cupen		Europa League	
No.	Pos	Nat	Player	Apps	Goals	Apps	Goals	Apps	Goals	Apps	Goals
Goalkeepers
1	GK	(Denmark) DEN	David Ousted	29	0	25	0	2	0	2	0
24	GK	(Sweden) SWE	Oliver Nnonyelu Dovin	1	0	1	0	0	0	0	0
31	GK	(Sweden) SWE	Davor Blažević	7	0	4	0	3	0	0	0
Defenders
2	DF	(Sweden) SWE	Simon Sandberg	21	0	18+2	0	1	0	0	0
3	DF	(Sweden) SWE	Dennis Widgren	23	1	12+6	0	4+1	1	0	0
4	DF	(Sweden) SWE	Richard Magyar	18	1	12+2	1	3	0	0+1	0
5	DF	(Sweden) SWE	David Fällman	30	0	23+2	0	3	0	2	0
13	DF	(Denmark) DEN	Mads Fenger	33	1	26+2	1	3	0	2	0
14	DF	(Sweden) SWE	Tim Söderström	30	1	14+10	1	4+1	0	1	0
26	DF	(Sweden) SWE	Kalle Björklund	16	1	6+8	1	1	0	1	0
30	DF	(Iraq) IRQ	Mohanad Jeahze	10	0	8	0	0	0	2	0
35	DF	(Sweden) SWE	Axel Sjöberg	2	0	0+1	0	0+1	0	0	0
Midfielders
6	MF	(Sweden) SWE	Darijan Bojanić	28	2	17+6	0	4	1	1	1
7	MF	(Sweden) SWE	Imad Khalili	27	5	7+15	4	3+1	1	1	0
8	MF	(Denmark) DEN	Jeppe Andersen	35	1	25+3	0	3+2	1	2	0
17	MF	(Sweden) SWE	Abdul Khalili	32	3	26+1	2	2+1	0	2	1
19	MF	(Gabon) GAB	Serge-Junior Martinsson Ngouali	21	0	9+9	0	1+1	0	1	0
20	MF	(Sweden) SWE	Alexander Kačaniklić	27	8	19+4	4	3	4	0+1	0
31	MF	(Sweden) SWE	Aimar Sher	23	1	9+12	1	0+2	0	0	0
33	MF	(Nigeria) NGR	Akinkunmi Amoo	7	2	0+6	0	1	2	0	0
Forwards
9	FW	(Brazil) BRA	Paulinho	23	4	10+6	3	3+2	0	2	1
16	FW	(Sweden) SWE	Gustav Ludwigson	35	10	22+7	9	2+3	1	1	0
23	FW	(United States) USA	Aron Jóhannsson	27	15	15+7	12	3	3	1+1	0
Players transferred/loaned out during the season
11	MF	(Montenegro) MNE	Vladimir Rodić	19	0	9+8	0	0+1	0	0+1	0
22	FW	(Sweden) SWE	Muamer Tanković	19	10	13+1	7	3+1	3	1	0
28	DF	(Brazil) BRA	Jean	4	0	0+2	0	0+2	0	0	0
34	FW	(Sweden) SWE	Emil Roback	1	0	0	0	0+1	0	0	0

Last updated: 14 December 2020
Source: hammarbyfotboll.se

== Club ==
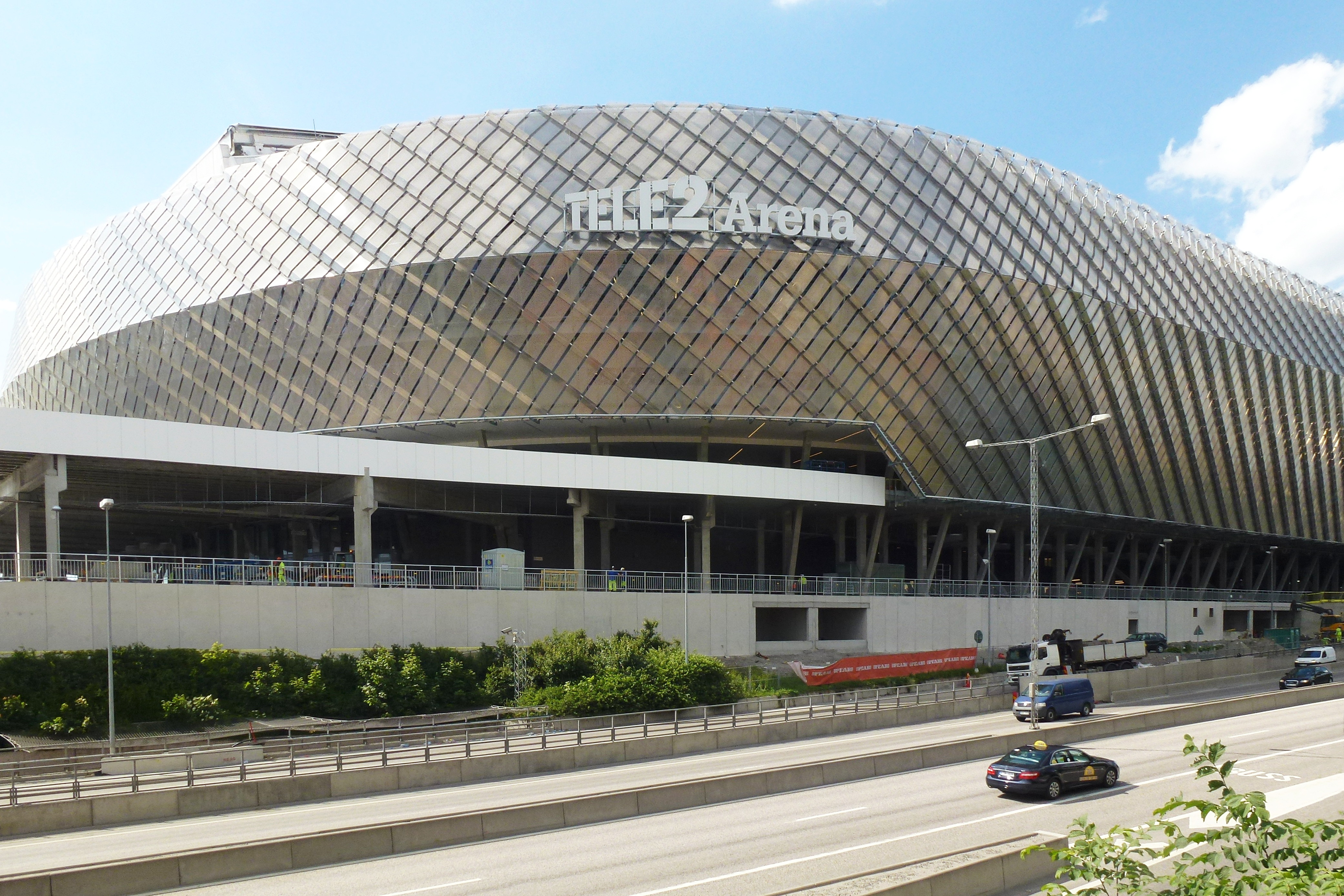
Tele2 Arena is the second largest stadium in Allsvenskan.

=== Coaching staff ===
Name	Role
(Sweden) Stefan Billborn	Head coach
(Sweden) Joachim Björklund	Assistant coach
(Sweden) Tony Gustavsson	First-team coach
(Sweden) Jimmy Lidberg	Fitness coach
(Sweden) Mikael "Mille" Olsson	Goalkeeping coach
(Sweden) Mathias Eriksson	Team manager
(Sweden) Wadda Tamimi	Assistant team manager
(England) David Sumpter	Data scientist
(Sweden) Mikael Klots Rubin	Head of medical team
(Sweden) Andreas Gavelius	Physiotherapist
(Sweden) Anders Bitén	Equipment manager
(Sweden) Fredrik Samuelsson	U19 head coach
(Sweden) Jonas Holtbäck	U17 head coach
(Sweden) Gustav Scheutz	U19 and U17 goalkeeping coach

=== Other information ===
Chairman	(Sweden) Richard von Yxkull
Managing director	(Sweden) Henrik Kindlund
Director of football	(Sweden) Jesper Jansson
Technical director	(Sweden) Ola Larsson
Head of scouting	(Sweden) Mikael Hjelmberg
Ground (capacity and dimensions)	Tele2 Arena (33,000 / )

== Pre-season and friendlies ==
=== Friendlies ===
21 January 2021 Friendly	Hammarby IF	1–0	FC Linköping City	Stockholm
13:00 CET (UTC+01)	Rodić 75'	Report		Stadium: Årsta Idrottsplats

28 January 2020 Friendly	Hammarby IF (Sweden)	0–4	(Denmark) FC Midtjylland	Stockholm
16:15 CET (UTC+01)		Report	Mabil 15', (yellow card) 36'; Sparv (yellow card) 38'; Vibe 52'; Dreyer 56'; Evander 60'	Stadium: Hammarby IP; Attendance: 2 432; Referee: Glenn Nyberg (Sweden)

1 February 2020 Friendly	FC Flora (Estonia)	1–1	(Sweden) Hammarby IF	Tallinn, Estonia
14:45 CET (UTC+02)	Kreida 62'	Report	Andersen (yellow card) 34'; Bojanić 90+2'	Stadium: EJLi Jalgpallihallis

8 February 2020 Friendly	Hammarby IF (Sweden)	2–4	(Czech Republic) Slavia Prague	Faro, Portugal
20:00 CET (UTC±00:00)	Magyar (yellow card) 19'; Tanković 35'; Andersen (yellow card) 65'; Ludwigson 86'	Report	Stanciu 3'; Masopust 7'; Bořil 23'; Coufal 87'; Musa (yellow card) 90'	Stadium: Estádio Algarve

12 February 2020 Friendly	S.C. Farense (Portugal)	3–2	(Sweden) Hammarby IF	Portugal
16:00 CET (UTC±00:00)	Bandarra 21'; Gauld 67' (pen.); Lucca 82'	Report	Kačaniklić 43'; Tanković 80'	Stadium: The Campus

== Competitions ==
=== Allsvenskan ===
==== League table ====
Pos	Team	Pld	W	D	L	GF	GA	GD	Pts	Qualification or relegation
6	IFK Norrköping	30	13	7	10	60	46	+14	46	
7	Örebro SK	30	12	6	12	37	41	−4	42	
8	Hammarby IF	30	10	11	9	47	47	0	41	Qualification for the Europa Conference League second qualifying round (Note: Hammarby IF qualified for the Europa Conference League second qualifying round by winning the 2020–21 Svenska Cupen.)
9	AIK	30	10	9	11	30	33	−3	39	
10	IK Sirius	30	9	11	10	43	51	−8	38	

Source: svenskfotboll.se (in Swedish)
Rules for classification: 1) Points; 2) Goal difference; 3) Goals scored; 4) Head-to-head points; 5) Head-to-head goal difference; 6) Head-to-head away goals scored; 7) Play-off
(Note: Play-off is only played if need to decide champion, teams for relegation or UEFA competition and will be played on a neutral ground).

==== Results summary ====
Overall								Home						Away					
Pld	W	D	L	GF	GA	GD	Pts	W	D	L	GF	GA	GD	W	D	L	GF	GA	GD
30	10	11	9	47	47	0	41	4	9	2	23	18	+5	6	2	7	24	29	−5

Source: svenskfotboll.se (in Swedish)

==== Results by round ====
Round	1	2	3	4	5	6	7	8	9	10	11	12	13	14	15	16	17	18	19	20	21	22	23	24	25	26	27	28	29	30
Ground	H	A	H	A	H	A	A	A	H	A	H	A	H	A	A	H	A	H	A	H	A	A	H	H	A	H	A	H	H	A
Result	W	D	L	L	W	L	D	W	D	L	W	D	D	W	W	D	L	D	W	D	L	W	D	W	W	D	L	D	L	L
Position	2	2	7	12	9	11	12	10	11	11	8	8	7	6	6	6	7	7	7	7	7	7	7	6	6	6	6	6	7	8

Source: see below
A = Away; H = Home; W = Win; D = Draw; L = Loss

==== Matches ====
Kickoff times are in (UTC+01) unless stated otherwise.

===== June =====
14 June 2020 Round 1	Hammarby IF	2–0	Östersunds FK	Stockholm
17:30	Paulinho (yellow card) 34'; Tanković 45', 59'	Report	Weymans (yellow card) 13'; Sonko Sundberg (yellow card) 79'	Stadium: Tele2 Arena; Attendance: 0 Referee: Bojan Pandžić (Sweden)
Note: Match was postponed from its original date due to concerns over the coronavirus pandemic and subsequently played behind closed doors.

17 June 2020 Round 2	IF Elfsborg	2–2	Hammarby IF	Borås
19:00	Alm 45+1'; Per Frick 84'	Report	Söderström (yellow card) 11'; Paulinho 66'; Kačaniklić 70'	Stadium: Borås Arena; Attendance: 0 Referee: Kristoffer Karlsson (Sweden)
Note: Match was postponed from its original date due to concerns over the coronavirus pandemic and subsequently played behind closed doors.

21 June 2020 Round 3	Hammarby IF	0–2	AIK	Stockholm
17:30	Jeppe Andersen (yellow card) 38'; Paulinho (yellow card) 63'	Report	Tihi (yellow card) 16'; Mets (yellow card) 47'; Strannegård (yellow card) 47'; Hussein 55'; Larsson 58' (pen.)	Stadium: Tele2 Arena; Attendance: 0 Referee: Andreas Ekberg (Sweden)
Note: Match was postponed from its original date due to concerns over the coronavirus pandemic and subsequently played behind closed doors.

28 June 2020 Round 4	Mjällby AIF	2–1	Hammarby IF	Hällevik
14:30	David Batanero (yellow card) 71'; Löfquist (yellow card) 85'; Bergström 88'; Ogbu 90+3'	Report	Tanković 1'; Magyar (red card) 27'; Andersen (yellow card) 43'; Widgren (yellow card) 63'; Fenger (yellow card) 89'; Kačaniklić (yellow card) 90+2'	Stadium: Strandvallen; Attendance: 0 Referee: Victor Wolf (Sweden)
Note: Match was postponed from its original date due to concerns over the coronavirus pandemic and subsequently played behind closed doors.

===== July =====
2 July 2020 Round 5	Hammarby IF	1–0	Varbergs BoIS	Stockholm
19:00	A. Khalili (yellow card) 30'; Ludwigson 33'; Sher (yellow card) 44'; Kačaniklić (yellow card) 77'	Report	Aliev (yellow card) 15'; Modig (yellow card) 45+2'; Ayer (yellow card) 71'	Stadium: Tele2 Arena; Attendance: 0 Referee: Fredrik Klitte (Sweden)
Note: Match was postponed from its original date due to concerns over the coronavirus pandemic and subsequently played behind closed doors.

5 July 2020 Round 6	BK Häcken	3–0	Hammarby IF	Gothenburg
17:30	Berggren 16'; Søderlund (yellow card) 36', (goal) 62'; Andersson 89'	Report	Widgren (yellow card) 15'; Sandberg (yellow card) 44'	Stadium: Bravida Arena; Attendance: 0 Referee: Andreas Ekberg (Sweden)
Note: Match was postponed from its original date due to concerns over the coronavirus pandemic and subsequently played behind closed doors.

11 July 2020 Round 7	Hammarby IF	0–0	IK Sirius	Stockholm
15:00	Widgren (yellow card) 10'; Andersen (yellow card) 53'; A. Khalili (yellow card) 66'; Fenger (yellow card) 90+7'	Report	Larson (yellow card) 27'; Hellborg (yellow card) 71'	Stadium: Tele2 Arena; Attendance: 0 Referee: Mohammed Al-Hakim (Sweden)
Note: Match was postponed from its original date due to concerns over the coronavirus pandemic and subsequently played behind closed doors.

16 July 2020 Round 8	Kalmar FF	1–2	Hammarby IF	Kalmar
19:00	Magnusson 8'; Ring (red card) 86'	Report	Paulinho 45+1'; Ludwigson 73'	Stadium: Guldfågeln Arena; Attendance: 0 Referee: Glenn Nyberg (Sweden)
Note: Match was postponed from its original date due to concerns over the coronavirus pandemic and subsequently played behind closed doors.

20 July 2020 Round 9	Hammarby IF	1–1	IFK Göteborg	Stockholm
19:00	Fenger (yellow card) 16'; Andersen (yellow card) 56'; I. Khalili 69'	Report	Aiesh 90+4' (pen.)	Stadium: Tele2 Arena; Attendance: 0 Referee: Kristoffer Karlsson (Sweden)
Note: Match was postponed from its original date due to concerns over the coronavirus pandemic and subsequently played behind closed doors.

23 July 2020 Round 10	Malmö FF	3–0	Hammarby IF	Malmö
19:00	Berget 28'; Thelin 36'; Antonsson 46'; Toivonen (yellow card) 77'	Report	Khalili (yellow card) 35'; A. Khalili (yellow card) 79'	Stadium: Eleda Stadion; Attendance: 0 Referee: Andreas Ekberg (Sweden)
Note: Match was postponed from its original date due to concerns over the coronavirus pandemic and subsequently played behind closed doors.

27 July 2020 Round 11	Hammarby IF	3–0	Örebro SK	Stockholm
19:00	Ludwigson 32'; Fenger 47'; A. Khalili 73'; Söderström (yellow card) 85'	Report	Gerzić (yellow card) 29'; Collander (yellow card) 40'; Hjertstrand (yellow card) 65'	Stadium: Tele2 Arena; Attendance: 0 Referee: Kaspar Sjöberg (Sweden)
Note: Match was postponed from its original date due to concerns over the coronavirus pandemic and subsequently played behind closed doors.

===== August =====
2 August 2020 Round 12	Helsingborgs IF	1–1	Hammarby IF	Helsingborg
14:30	Hendriksson (yellow card) 11'; Svensson 21'; Abubakari (yellow card) 29'; Randrup (yellow card) 31'	Report	Martinsson Ngouali (yellow card) 38'; Sher (yellow card) 83'; Söderström (yellow card) 90'; Gustav Ludwigson 90+3'; I. Khalili (yellow card) 90+4'	Stadium: Olympia; Attendance: 0 Referee: Adam Ladebäck (Sweden)
Note: Match was postponed from its original date due to concerns over the coronavirus pandemic and subsequently played behind closed doors.

5 August 2020 Round 13	Hammarby IF	1–1	Falkenbergs FF	Stockholm
19:00	Kačaniklić 72'	Report	Wede 10'; Noring (yellow card) 14'; Joza (yellow card) 37'; Karlsson (yellow card) 43'; Mathisen (yellow card) 66'; Johansson (yellow card) 85'	Stadium: Tele2 Arena; Attendance: 0 Referee: Kristoffer Karlsson (Sweden)
Note: Match was postponed from its original date due to concerns over the coronavirus pandemic and subsequently played behind closed doors.

9 August 2020 Round 14	Djurgårdens IF	1–2	Hammarby IF	Stockholm
17:30	Karlström (yellow card) 68'; Fenger 74' (o.g.)	Report	Jóhannsson 4'; I. Khalili 33'; Fällman (yellow card) 38'; Björklund (yellow card) 58'; Ludwigson (yellow card) 67'; Andersen (yellow card) 68'; Sher (yellow card) 90+1'	Stadium: Tele2 Arena; Attendance: 0 Referee: Andreas Ekberg (Sweden)
Note: Match was postponed from its original date due to concerns over the coronavirus pandemic and subsequently played behind closed doors.

14 August 2020 Round 15	IFK Norrköping	1–2	Hammarby IF	Norrköping
19:00	Wahlqvist (yellow card) 22'; Krogh Gerson 51' (pen.)	Report	Björklund 16', (yellow card) 37'; Andersen (yellow card) 28'; Widgren (yellow card) 64'; Ousted (yellow card) 90+5'; A. Khalili 90+5'	Stadium: Nya Parken; Attendance: 0 Referee: Bojan Pandžić (Sweden)
Note: Match was postponed from its original date due to concerns over the coronavirus pandemic and subsequently played behind closed doors.

16 August 2020 Round 16	Hammarby IF	2–2	IF Elfsborg	Stockholm
14:30	I. Khalili 32'; Aron Jóhannsson 79' (pen.); Jean (yellow card) 82'; Fällman (yellow card) 88'	Report	Frick 19', (yellow card) 86'; Karlsson 64'; Strand (yellow card) 69' (yellow-red card) 78'; Okumu (yellow card) 87'	Stadium: Tele2 Arena; Attendance: 0 Referee: Mohammed Al-Hakim (Sweden)
Note: Match was postponed from its original date due to concerns over the coronavirus pandemic and subsequently played behind closed doors.

22 August 2020 Round 17	IK Sirius	3–1	Hammarby IF	Uppsala
15:00	Ekdal (yellow card) 34'; Saeid 85' (pen.); Vecchia 90' (pen.); Andersson 90+5'	Report	Guerreiro 39'; Ludwigson (yellow card) 78'; Widgren (yellow card) 83' (red card); Tim Söderström (yellow card) 89'	Stadium: Studenternas IP; Attendance: 0 Referee: Kaspar Sjöberg (Sweden)
Note: Match was postponed from its original date due to concerns over the coronavirus pandemic and subsequently played behind closed doors.

30 August 2020 Round 18	Hammarby IF	3–3	Kalmar FF	Stockholm
17:30	Magyar 28'; Ludwigson (yellow card) 33'; Jóhannsson 47', 60' (pen.)	Report	Johansson 34' (pen.); Ingelsson 37'; Aliti (yellow card) 54'; Nouri (yellow card) 79'; Ahl Holmström 82', (yellow card) 87'	Stadium: Tele2 Arena; Attendance: 0 Referee: Adam Ladebäck (Sweden)
Note: Match was postponed from its original date due to concerns over the coronavirus pandemic and subsequently played behind closed doors.

===== September =====
10 September 2020 Round 19	IFK Göteborg	0–4	Hammarby IF	Gothenburg
19:00	Kouakou (yellow card) 41'; Aiesh (yellow card) 45'; Wernbloom (yellow card) 59'	Report	Jóhannsson 20'; Fenger (yellow card) 31'; Andersen (yellow card) 54'; Sher (yellow card) 61'; Khalili (yellow card) 63'; Tanković 71', 78', 87'; Jeahze (yellow card) 75'	Stadium: Gamla Ullevi; Attendance: 0 Referee: Kristoffer Karlsson (Sweden)
Note: Match was postponed from its original date due to concerns over the coronavirus pandemic and subsequently played behind closed doors.

13 September 2020 Round 20	Hammarby IF	2–2	Helsingborgs IF	Stockholm
14:30	I. Khalili 12'; Jóhannsson 55'	Report	Svensson 47'; Figueroa (yellow card) 53'; Ceesay (yellow card) 59'; Timossi Andersson 73'	Stadium: Tele2 Arena; Attendance: 0 Referee: Victor Wolf (Sweden)
Note: Match was postponed from its original date due to concerns over the coronavirus pandemic and subsequently played behind closed doors.

20 September 2020 Round 21	AIK	3–0	Hammarby IF	Solna
14:30	Bahoui 27'; Abraham 37'; Karlsson (yellow card) 75'; Lustig 77'	Report	Rodić (yellow card) 54'	Stadium: Friends Arena; Attendance: 0 Referee: Mohammed Al-Hakim (Sweden)
Note: Match was postponed from its original date due to concerns over the coronavirus pandemic and subsequently played behind closed doors.

20 September 2020 Round 22	Falkenbergs FF	1–3	Hammarby IF	Falkenberg
14:30	Wede 12', (yellow card) 58'; Noring (yellow card) 90+2'	Report	Ericsson 60' (o.g.); Jóhannsson 66', (yellow card) 82', (goal) 90+3' (pen.)	Stadium: Falcon Alkoholfri Arena; Attendance: 0 Referee: Glenn Nyberg (Sweden)
Note: Match was postponed from its original date due to concerns over the coronavirus pandemic and subsequently played behind closed doors.

===== October =====
4 October 2020 Round 23	Hammarby IF	1–1	Djurgårdens IF	Stockholm
14:30	Tanković 24'; Jóhannsson (yellow card) 67'; Söderström (yellow card) 82'; Andersen (yellow card) 84'	Report	Radetinac (yellow card) 48'; Ulvestad (yellow card) 53'; Nyholm 90+4'	Stadium: Tele2 Arena; Attendance: 0 Referee: Kristoffer Karlsson (Sweden)
Note: Match was postponed from its original date due to concerns over the coronavirus pandemic and subsequently played behind closed doors.

18 October 2020 Round 24	Hammarby IF	4–2	Mjällby AIF	Stockholm
14:30	Ludwigson 3', 12'; Jóhannsson 5'; Söderström 62', (yellow card) 79'; Magyar (yellow card) 90'	Report	Moro 25'; Spelmann (yellow card) 33'; Nyholm 90+4'; Batanero 69', (yellow card) 73'	Stadium: Tele2 Arena; Attendance: 0 Referee: Granit Maqedonci (Sweden)
Note: Match was postponed from its original date due to concerns over the coronavirus pandemic and subsequently played behind closed doors.

25 October 2020 Round 25	Östersunds FK	1–3	Hammarby IF	Östersund
14:30	Fritzson (yellow card) 57'; Turgott 78'	Report	Ludwigson 53'; Kačaniklić 62'; Jóhannsson 74', (yellow card) 80'; Amoo (yellow card) 90+2'	Stadium: Jämtkraft Arena; Attendance: 0 Referee: Fredrik Klitte (Sweden)
Note: Match was postponed from its original date due to concerns over the coronavirus pandemic and subsequently played behind closed doors.

===== November =====
1 November 2020 Round 26	Hammarby IF	1–1	BK Häcken	Stockholm
14:30	Fenger (yellow card) 21'; Sher 90+1'	Report	Søderlund 17', (yellow card) 77'; Yasin (yellow card) 45'	Stadium: Tele2 Arena; Attendance: 0 Referee: Bojan Pandžić (Sweden)
Note: Match was postponed from its original date due to concerns over the coronavirus pandemic and subsequently played behind closed doors.

8 November 2020 Round 27	Varbergs BoIS	5–2	Hammarby IF	Varberg
14:30	Selmani 8', 33' (pen.), 84'; Book 53'; Mensah (yellow card) 54'; Lindner (yellow card) 64'; Barny (yellow card) 68'; Zackrisson (yellow card) 76'; Ejupi 80'	Report	Jeahze (yellow card) 7' (yellow-red card) 38'; Jóhannsson 45+3' (pen.); Ludwigson 54'; Fällman (yellow card) 64'; A. Khalili (yellow card) 77'	Stadium: Varberg Energi Arena; Attendance: 0 Referee: Glenn Nyberg (Sweden)
Note: Match was postponed from its original date due to concerns over the coronavirus pandemic and subsequently played behind closed doors.

22 November 2020 Round 28	Hammarby IF	2–2	Malmö FF	Stockholm
17:30	Jóhannsson (yellow card) 29', (goal) 35'; Söderström (yellow card) 53'; Fällman (yellow card) 57'; Kačaniklić 79'; Andersen (yellow card) 82'	Report	Ericsson 13' (o.g.); Christiansen (yellow card) 27', (goal) 45'; Rieks (yellow card) 57'; Traustason (yellow card) 58'	Stadium: Tele2 Arena; Attendance: 0 Referee: Andreas Ekberg (Sweden)
Note: Match was postponed from its original date due to concerns over the coronavirus pandemic and subsequently played behind closed doors.

===== December =====
1 December 2020 Round 29	Hammarby IF	0–1	IFK Norrköping	Stockholm
19:00		Report	Nyman 39'	Stadium: Tele2 Arena; Attendance: 0 Referee: Mohammed Al-Hakim (Sweden)
Note: Match was postponed from its original date due to concerns over the coronavirus pandemic and subsequently played behind closed doors.

6 December 2020 Round 30	Örebro SK	2–1	Hammarby IF	Örebro
14:30	Skovgaard 17'; Mehmeti (yellow card) 31'; Besara (yellow card) 64'; Seger (yellow card) 87'; Björndahl 90'	Report	Magyar (yellow card) 13' (yellow-red card) 30'; Fenger (yellow card) 40'; Ludwigson 68'; Fällman (yellow card) 90+1'	Stadium: Tele2 Arena; Attendance: 0 Referee: Kristoffer Karlsson (Sweden)
Note: Match was postponed from its original date due to concerns over the coronavirus pandemic and subsequently played behind closed doors.

=== Svenska Cupen ===
==== 2019–20 ====
The tournament continued from the 2019 season.

Kickoff times are in UTC+1.

===== Group 3 =====
Pos	Team	Pld	W	D	L	GF	GA	GD	Pts	Qualification
1	Hammarby IF	3	3	0	0	11	1	+10	9	Advance to Knockout stage
2	Varbergs BoIS	3	1	1	1	6	7	−1	4	
3	IF Brommapojkarna	3	0	2	1	3	5	−2	2	
4	GIF Sundsvall	3	0	1	2	3	10	−7	1	

Source: Swedish Football Association
Rules for classification: 1) Points; 2) Goal difference; 3) Goals scored; 4) Head-to-head record; 5) Highest ranked team

24 February 2020 Matchday 1	Hammarby IF	5–1	Varbergs BoIS	Stockholm
19:00	Bojanić (yellow card) 8'; Jóhannsson 19', 57'; Kačaniklić 27', 52'; Tanković (yellow card) 77', (goal) 90+2'	Report	Modig (yellow card) 51'; Johansson 66'; Tranberg (yellow card) 76'; Lindner (yellow card) 81'	Stadium: Tele2 Arena; Attendance: 14 518; Referee: Victor Wolf (Sweden)

1 March 2020 Matchday 2	IF Brommapojkarna	0–2	Hammarby IF	Stockholm
16:30	Arvidsson (yellow card) 85'	Report	I. Khalili 2'; Magyar (yellow card) 25'; Kačaniklić 58'	Stadium: Grimsta IP; Attendance: 3 186; Referee: Mohammed Al-Hakim (Sweden)

8 March 2020 Matchday 3	Hammarby IF	4–0	GIF Sundsvall	Stockholm
12:30	Jóhannsson 46'; Bojanić 56'; Kačaniklić 73'; Tanković 87'	Report		Stadium: Tele2 Arena; Attendance: 14 350; Referee: Martin Strömbergsson (Sweden)

===== Knockout stage =====
25 June 2020 Quarter-finals	Hammarby IF	1–3 (a.e.t.)	IFK Göteborg	Stockholm
18:00	Tanković 19'; Andersen (red card) 52'; Guerreiro (yellow card) 103'; Fällman (yellow card) 104'	Report	Aiesh 54', 104' (pen.) Calisir (yellow card) 84'; Yusuf (yellow card) 106'; Abraham 108'	Stadium: Tele2 Arena; Attendance: 0 Referee: (Sweden)
Note: Match was postponed from its original date due to concerns over the coronavirus pandemic and subsequently played behind closed doors.

==== 2020–21 ====
The tournament continues into the 2021 season.

===== Qualification stage =====
12 November 2020 Round 2	FC Gute	0–5	Hammarby IF	Visby
18:00		Report	Andersen 5'; Amoo 32', 73'; Widgren 45'; Ludwigson 67'	Stadium: Gutavallen; Attendance: 3 935; Referee: Adam Ladebäck (Sweden)

=== UEFA Europa League ===
Kickoff times are in UTC+1 unless stated otherwise.

==== 2020–21 ====
===== Qualifying phase and play-off round =====
====== First qualifying round ======
27 August 2020	Hammarby IF	3–0	Puskás Akadémia	Stockholm
19:00	A. Khalili 14'; Bojanić 32'; Guerreiro 84'; Rodić (yellow card) 89'	Report	Kiss (yellow card) 30'; Nagy (yellow card) 33'; Latifi (yellow card) 48'	Stadium: Tele2 Arena; Attendance: 0 Referee: Mario Zebec, (Croatia)
Note: Match was played behind closed doors due to concerns over the coronavirus pandemic.

====== Second qualifying round ======
16 September 2020	Hammarby IF	0–3	Lech Poznań	Stockholm
19:00	Jeahze (yellow card) 14'; Andersen (yellow card) 27' (yellow-red card) 63'; Martinsson Ngouali (yellow card) 47'; Ousted (yellow card) 80'; A. Khalili (yellow card) 81'; Kačaniklić (yellow card) 82'	Report	Ramírez (yellow card) 36'; Tiba 55'; Kamiński (yellow card) 82', (goal) 89'; Skóraś (yellow card) 83'; Marchwiński 90+3'	Stadium: Tele2 Arena; Attendance: 0 Referee: Sascha Stegemann, (Germany)
Note: Match was played behind closed doors due to concerns over the coronavirus pandemic.
