= Kim Ju-hwan =

Kim Ju-hwan may refer to:

- Kim Ju-hwan (footballer, born 1982)
- Kim Ju-hwan (footballer, born 2001)
