= Gustav Ludwigson =

Swedish footballer (born 1993)

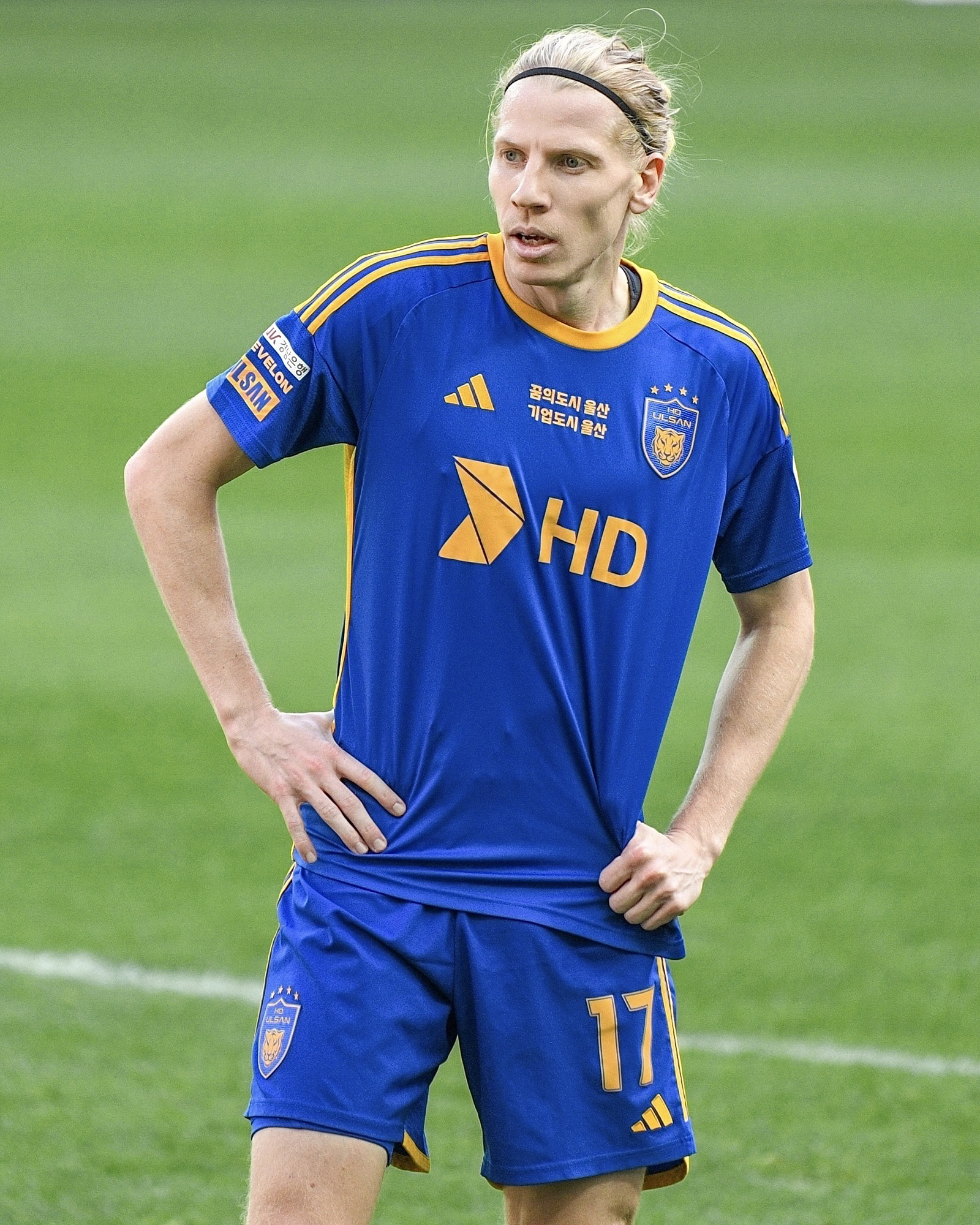
- Ludwigson with Ulsan HD in 2024

Personal information
- Full name: Gustav Erik Ludwigson
- Date of birth: 20 October 1993 (age 33)
- Place of birth: Gothenburg, Sweden
- Height: 1.82 m (6 ft 0 in)
- Position: Forward

Team information
- Current team: Daejeon Hana Citizen
- Number: 17

Youth career
- –2011: Mölnlycke IF

Senior career*
Years	Team	Apps	(Gls)
2011–2014	Mölnlycke IF	53	(27)
2015–2017	Sävedalens IF	60	(23)
2018–2019	Örgryte IS	59	(23)
2020–2022	Hammarby IF	88	(32)
2023–2025	Ulsan HD	85	(18)
2026-	Daejeon Hana Citizen	21	(2)
- * Club domestic league appearances and goals as of 3 August 2026

Gustav Erik Ludwigson (born 20 October 1993) is a Swedish footballer who plays as a forward or as a second striker for K League 1 club Daejeon Hana Citizen.

== Club career ==
=== Early career ===
Ludwigson started to play football with local club Mölnycke IF. In 2015, he transferred to Sävedalens IF.

In total, Ludwigson would go on to score 23 goals in 60 league games for Sävedalen across three seasons. He helped the club to win a promotion to Division 2, Sweden's fourth tier, before leaving in 2017.

=== Örgryte IS ===
On 21 December 2017, Ludwigson signed a one-year contract with Örgryte IS in Superettan, the domestic second tier. He had previously gone on trial with the club twice in his career.

In his first season at the club, Ludwigson scored 11 goals and featured in all 30 league games. In August 2018, he extended his contract until 2020. Örgryte finished 4th in the 2018 Superettan table, and at the end of season Ludwigson was voted as Player of the Year by the fans of the club.

Ludwigson retained his fine form in 2019, and won the prize of Superettan Player of the Month in July.

=== Hammarby IF ===
==== 2020 ====
On 8 August 2019, it was announced that Ludwigson would join Hammarby IF in Allsvenskan ahead of the 2020 season. He signed a three-year deal with the club, and reports suggested a transfer fee of around 0,5 million Swedish kronor. In his debut season in 2020, Ludwigson scored nine goals and provided 11 assists in 29 league games, being voted as Hammarby Player of the Year by the supporters of the club, although the side disappointedly finished 8th in the Allsvenskan table.

==== 2021 ====
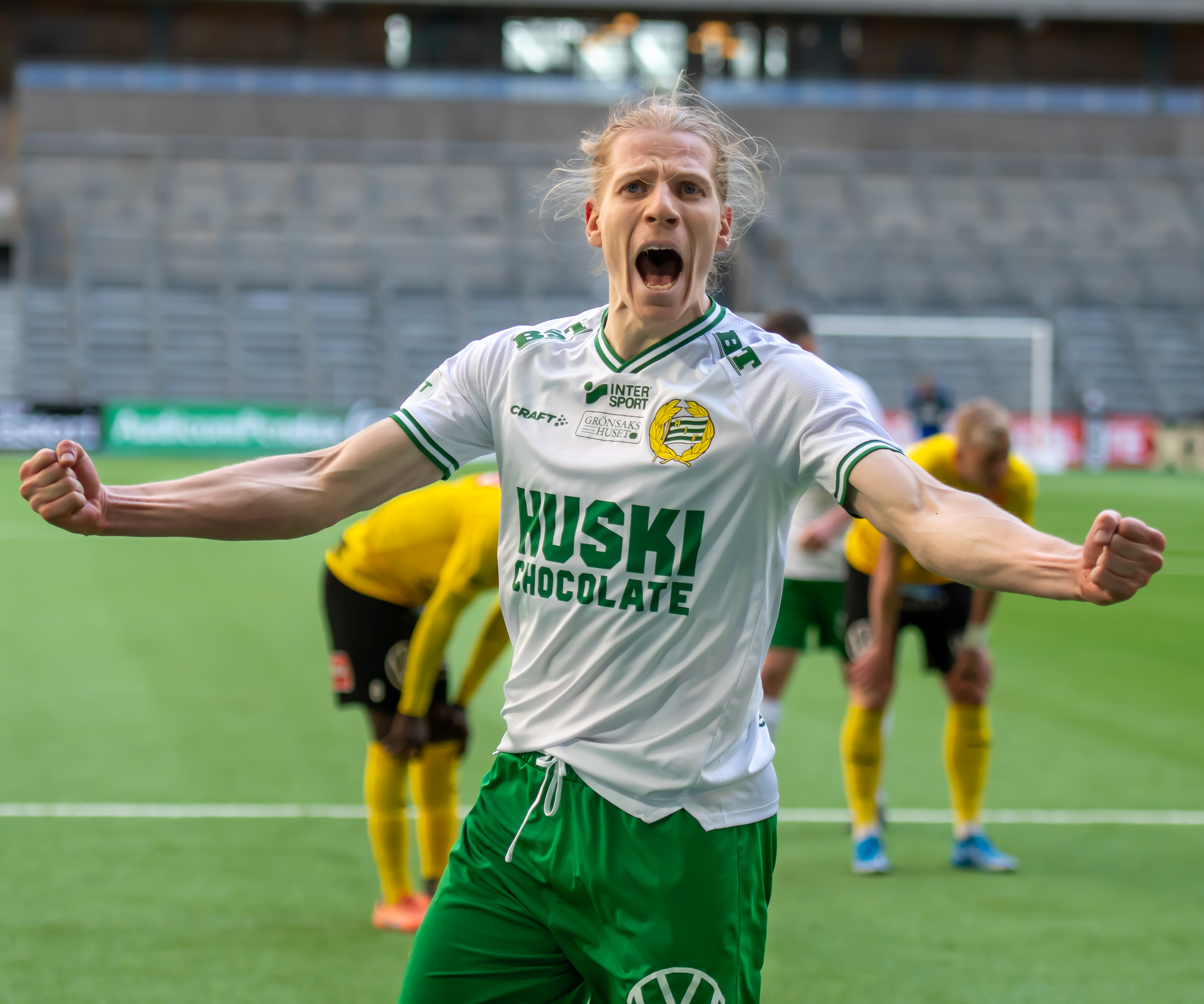
Ludwigson with Hammarby IF in 2021

On 26 March 2021, Ludwigson renewed his contract with Hammarby, with his new deal running until the end of 2024. On 30 May 2021, Ludwigson won the 2020–21 Svenska Cupen, the main domestic cup, with Hammarby through a 5–4 win on penalties (0–0 after full-time) against BK Häcken in the final. He featured in all six games as the side reached the play-off round of the 2021–22 UEFA Europa Conference League, after eliminating Maribor (4–1 on aggregate) and FK Čukarički (6–4 on aggregate, in which Ludwigson scored), where the club was knocked out by Basel (4–4 on aggregate) after a penalty shoot-out. On 23 September 2021, Ludwigson was appointed as the new vice-captain of Hammarby by head coach Miloš Milojević. Ludwigson was named Hammarby Player of the Year for a second consecutive season, being only the second ever player to win the prize twice beside Max von Schlebrügge.

==== 2022 ====
On 4 March 2022, Ludwigson signed a new five-year contract with Hammarby, running until the end of 2026. In the process, he reportedly turned down a move to Ulsan Hyundai. Ludwigson featured in the final of the 2021–22 Svenska Cupen, in which Hammarby lost by 4–5 on penalties to Malmö FF after the game ended in a 0–0 draw.

=== Ulsan Hyundai ===
On 5 January 2023, Ludwigson transferred to K League 1 club Ulsan Hyundai, linking up with his former teammate Darijan Bojanić. The transfer fee was reportedly set at around 6 million SEK, after the Korean club activated a release clause in Ludwigson's contract.

== International career ==
Ludwigson was called up to the Sweden national team for the training tour in Portugal in early 2022, that later was cancelled due to the COVID-19 pandemic.

== Personal life ==
Ludwigson is the great-grandson of footballer Robert Zander, who represented Sweden in the 1920 and 1924 Summer Olympics.

== Career statistics ==
=== Club ===
As of match played 3 August 2026

Appearances and goals by club, season and competition
Club	Season	League			Cup		Continental		Total	
Club	Season	Division	Apps	Goals	Apps	Goals	Apps	Goals	Apps	Goals
Mölnlycke IF	2011	Division 5B Göteborg	9	4	—		—		9	4
Mölnlycke IF	2012	Division 4B Göteborg	14	10	—		—		14	10
Mölnlycke IF	2013	Division 4B Göteborg	20	8	—		—		20	8
Mölnlycke IF	2014	Division 4B Göteborg	10	5	—		—		10	5
Mölnlycke IF	Total		53	27	—		—		53	27
Sävedalens IF	2015	Division 3 Mellersta Götaland	13	4	0	0	—		13	4
Sävedalens IF	2016	Division 2 Västra Götaland	23	11	0	0	—		23	11
Sävedalens IF	2017	Division 2 Västra Götaland	24	8	1	0	—		25	8
Sävedalens IF	Total		60	23	1	0	—		61	23
Örgryte IS	2018	Superettan	30	11	3	0	—		33	11
Örgryte IS	2019	Superettan	29	12	1	0	—		30	12
Örgryte IS	Total		59	23	4	0	—		63	23
Hammarby IF	2020	Allsvenskan	29	9	5	1	1 (Note: Appearances in UEFA Europa League)	0	35	10
Hammarby IF	2021	Allsvenskan	30	11	6	2	6 (Note: Appearances in UEFA Europa Conference League)	1	40	14
Hammarby IF	2022	Allsvenskan	29	12	4	1	—		33	13
Hammarby IF	Total		88	32	15	4	7	1	110	37
Ulsan Hyundai/ Ulsan HD	2023	K League 1	27	6	2	0	5 (Note: Appearances in AFC Champions League)	3	34	9
Ulsan Hyundai/ Ulsan HD	2024	K League 1	22	7	2	0	10 (Note: Appearances in AFC Champions League Elite)	0	34	7
Ulsan Hyundai/ Ulsan HD	2025	K League 1	36	4	1	0	6 (Note: 3 Appearances in AFC Champions League Elite and 3 Appearances in FIFA World Cup)	1	43	6
Ulsan Hyundai/ Ulsan HD	Total		85	18	5	0	18	4	111	22
Daejeon Hana Citizen	2026	K League 1	21	2	1	0	0	0	22	2
Career total			366	125	26	4	25	5	417	134

== Honours ==
Hammarby IF

- Svenska Cupen: 2020–21

Ulsan Hyundai

- K League 1: 2023, 2024

Individual

- Hammarby IF Player of the Year: 2020, 2021
- Allsvenskan top assist provider: 2020
