= Aimar Sher =

Iraqi footballer (born 2002)

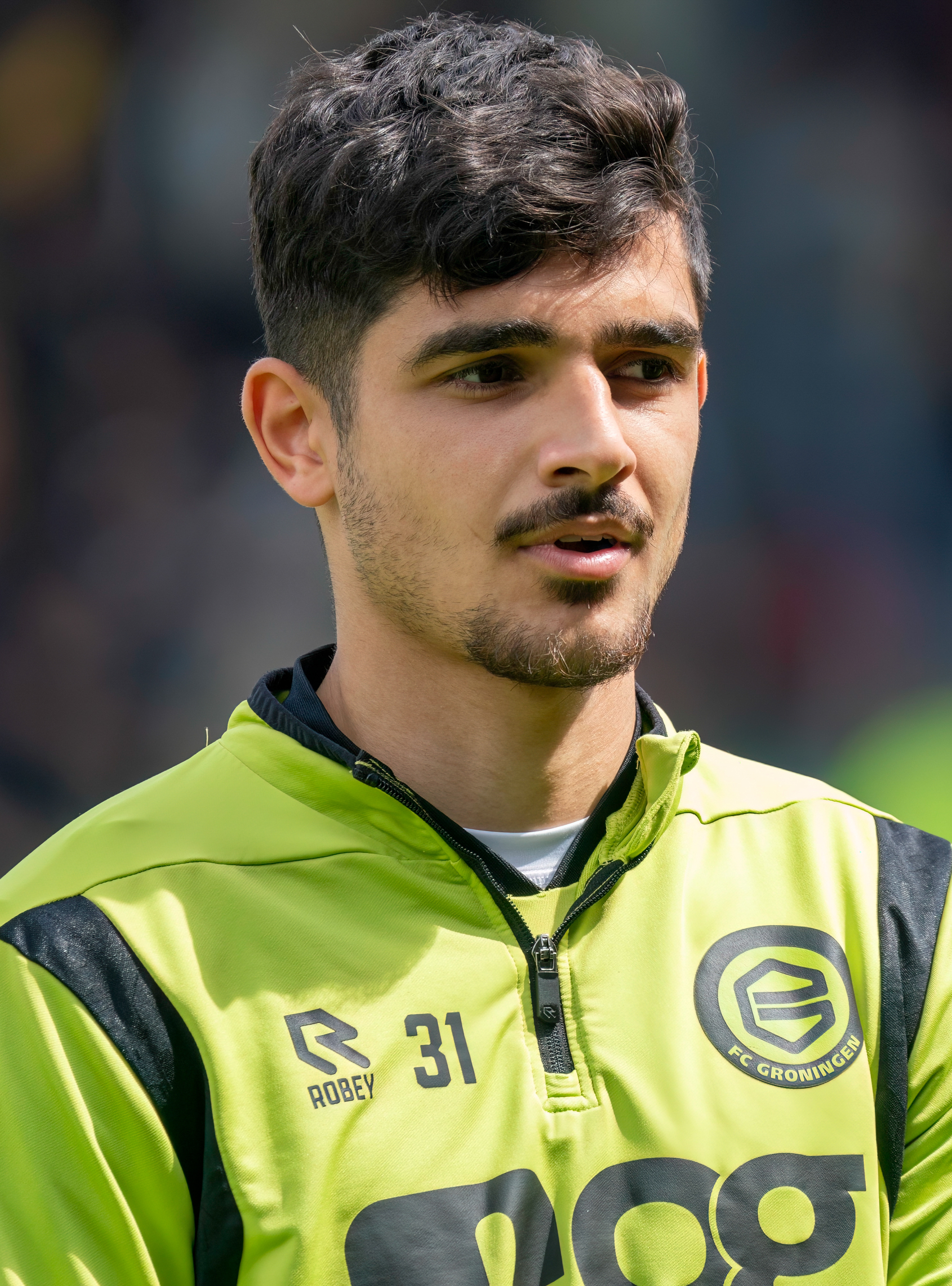
- Sher in 2023

Personal information
- Full name: Aimar Hazar Anwar Sher
- Date of birth: 20 December 2002 (age 23)
- Place of birth: Kirkuk, Iraq
- Height: 1.84 m (6 ft 0 in)
- Position: Midfielder

Team information
- Current team: Sarpsborg 08
- Number: 6

Youth career
- Mälarhöjdens IK
- Enskede IK
- 2013–2019: Hammarby IF

Senior career*
Years	Team	Apps	(Gls)
2019–2021	Hammarby IF	32	(1)
2020	→ IK Frej (loan)	7	(0)
2021–2023	Spezia	1	(0)
2023	→ Groningen (loan)	6	(0)
2024–	Sarpsborg 08	57	(1)

International career^{‡}
2018	Sweden U17	2	(1)
2019–2020	Sweden U19	3	(0)
2021–2024	Sweden U21	5	(1)
2025–	Iraq	4	(0)
- * Club domestic league appearances and goals as of 23 July 2026 ‡ National team caps and goals as of 18 November 2025

Aimar Hazar Anwar Sher (born 20 December 2002) is an Iraqi professional footballer who plays as a midfielder for Sarpsborg 08 and the Iraq national team.

== Early life ==
Sher was born in Kirkuk, Iraq to Assyro-Chaldean parents, but moved to Sweden at age four together with his family.

He grew up in Stockholm and started to play football as a youngster with local clubs Mälarhöjdens IK and Enskede IK, before joining the academy of Hammarby IF in 2013. Sher was part of the Hammarby side that won the U17 Swedish championship in 2019.

== Club career ==
=== Hammarby IF ===
On 21 August 2019, Sher made his competitive debut for Hammarby in a 3–1 away win against IFK Luleå in Svenska Cupen. The next month, on 25 September, Sher made his league debut for the club, coming on as a late substitute in a 3–1 away win against IK Sirius in Allsvenskan. He became Hammarby's youngest Allsvenskan debutant so far at age 16 and nine months, surpassing the former record holder Isac Lidberg. Sher signed his first professional contract with Hammarby on 20 November 2019.

On 5 August 2020, Sher signed a new two-year contract with Hammarby after establishing himself in the first-team squad. He scored his first competitive goal for the club on 1 November the same year, a stoppage-time equaliser in a 1–1 home draw against BK Häcken. In his full debut season, Sher played 21 games, although the side disappointedly finished 8th in the table.

On 30 May 2021, Sher won the 2020–21 Svenska Cupen with Hammarby, through a 5–4 win on penalties (0–0 after full-time) against BK Häcken in the final, where he scored his attempt.

=== Spezia ===
On 19 August 2021, Sher transferred to Spezia in the Serie A, for a reported fee of around €1,5 million, signing a five-year contract. On 3 October, he made his competitive debut for the club in a 0–4 home loss against Hellas Verona.

==== Loan to Groningen ====
On 17 January 2023, Sher was loaned by FC Groningen in the Netherlands.

==== Release by Spezia ====
On 1 September 2023, his contract with Spezia was terminated by mutual consent.

== International career ==
Sher scored in his debut for the Swedish U17 national team in a 1–2 friendly loss against Denmark on 18 April 2018.

On 7 September 2021, Sher made his debut for the Swedish U21 national team, coming on as a substitute in a 1–1 away draw against Bosnia and Herzegovina, in the qualification to the 2023 UEFA European Under-21 Championship.

On 24 February 2025, Sher's request to switch allegiance to Iraq was approved by FIFA.

== Personal life ==
His first name is an homage to the Argentinian former football player Pablo Aimar. Sher is a Christian.

== Career statistics ==
=== Club ===
As of 18 July 2025

Club	Season	League			Cup		Continental		Total	
Club	Season	Division	Apps	Goals	Apps	Goals	Apps	Goals	Apps	Goals
Hammarby IF	2019	Allsvenskan	1	0	1	0	—		2	0
Hammarby IF	2020	Allsvenskan	21	1	1	0	0	0	22	1
Hammarby IF	2021	Allsvenskan	10	0	1	0	2 (Note: Appearances in UEFA Europa Conference League)	0	13	0
Hammarby IF	Total		32	1	3	0	2	0	37	1
IK Frej (loan)	2020	Ettan	7	0	0	0	—		7	0
Spezia	2021–22	Serie A	1	0	1	0	—		2	0
Spezia	2022–23	Serie A	0	0	1	0	—		1	0
Spezia	Total		1	0	2	0	—		3	0
Groningen (loan)	2022–23	Eredivisie	6	0	0	0	—		6	0
Sarpsborg 08	2024	Eliteserien	27	0	4	0	—		31	0
Sarpsborg 08	2025	Eliteserien	9	0	3	0	—		12	0
Sarpsborg 08	Total		36	0	7	0	—		43	0
Career total			82	1	12	0	2	0	96	1

== Honours ==
Hammarby IF

- Svenska Cupen: 2020–21
