= Kim Min-jun (footballer, born February 2000) =

South Korean association football player

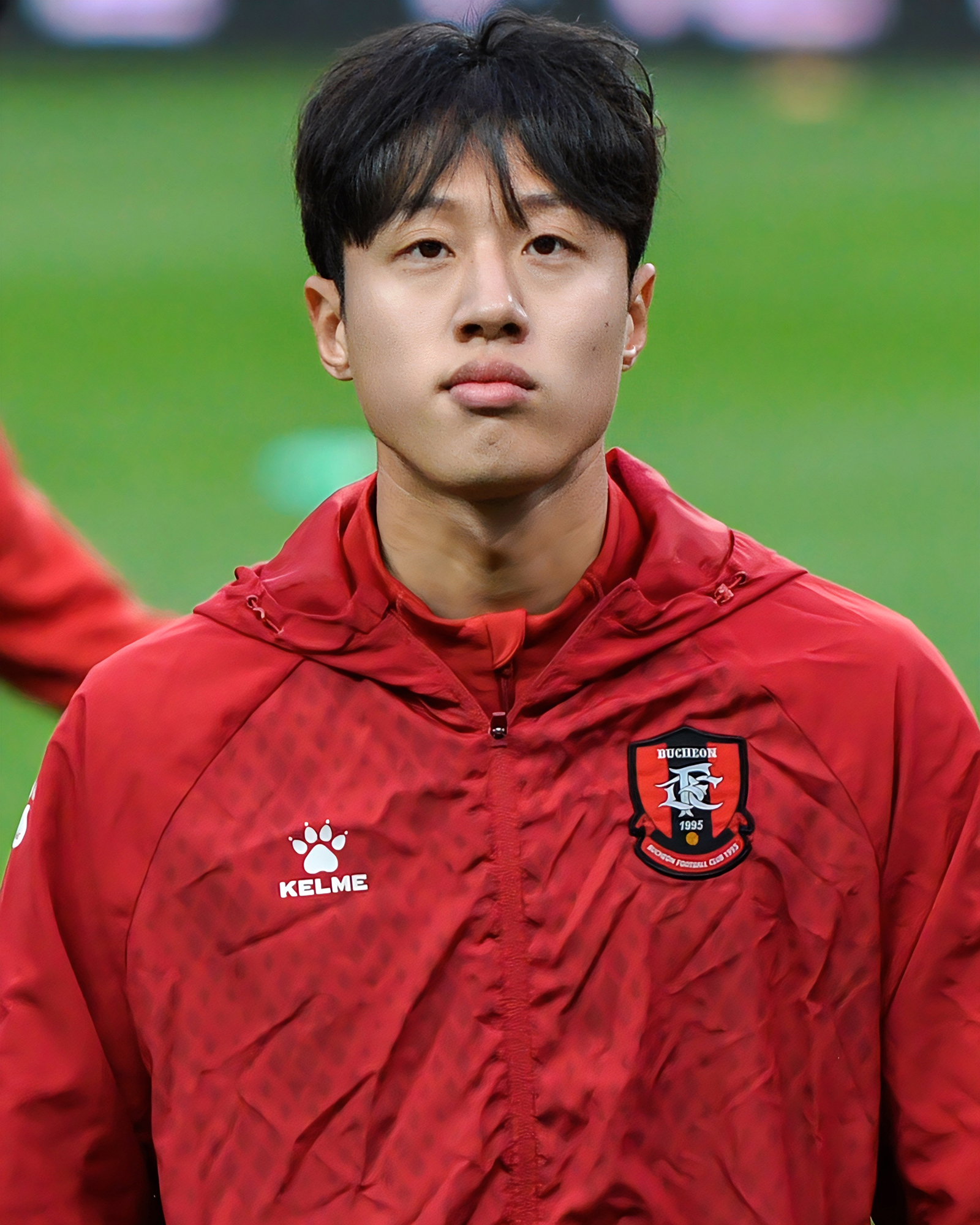
- Kim in 2026

Personal information
- Date of birth: 12 February 2000 (age 26)
- Place of birth: South Korea
- Height: 1.83 m (6 ft 0 in)
- Position: Forward

Team information
- Current team: Bucheon FC 1995
- Number: 13

Youth career
- 2010–2011: Hansol Elementary School
- 2012: Boin Middle School
- 2013: Incheon Chelsea Soccer School
- 2014–2015: Gyeyang Middle School
- 2016–2018: Ulsan Hyundai
- 2019: University of Ulsan

Senior career*
Years	Team	Apps	(Gls)
2020–2024	Ulsan HD	53	(7)
2023–2024	→ Gimcheon Sangmu (army)	40	(7)
2025	Gangwon FC	9	(0)
2026–	Bucheon FC 1995	15	(1)
Korean name
Hangul	김민준
RR	Gim Minjun
MR	Kim Minjun
- * Club domestic league appearances and goals as of 4 August 2026

Kim Min-jun (Korean: 김민준; born 12 February 2000) is a South Korean footballer who plays as a forward for K League 1 club Bucheon FC 1995.

== Career statistics ==
As of 4 January 2026

Appearances and goals by club, season and competition
Club	Season	League			National cup		Continental		Other		Total	
Club	Season	Division	Apps	Goals	Apps	Goals	Apps	Goals	Apps	Goals	Apps	Goals
Ulsan HD	2020	K League 1	0	0	0	0	0 (Note: Appearances in AFC Champions League)	0	—		0	0
Ulsan HD	2021	K League 1	28	5	0	0	5	2	1 (Note: Appearance in FIFA Club World Cup)	0	34	7
Ulsan HD	2022	K League 1	19	1	1	0	1	0	—		21	1
Ulsan HD	2024	K League 1	6	1	2	1	4	0	—		12	2
Ulsan HD	Total		53	7	3	1	10	2	1	0	67	10
Gimcheon Sangmu	2023	K League 2	28	6	1	0	—		—		29	6
Gimcheon Sangmu	2024	K League 1	12	1	1	1	—		—		13	2
Gimcheon Sangmu	Total		40	7	2	1	—		—		42	8
Gangwon FC	2025	K League 1	9	0	1	0			—		29	6
Career total			102	14	6	2	10	2	1	0	119	18
