= Tim Waker =

Swedish footballer

Personal information
- Full name: Tim Roger Waker
- Date of birth: 4 January 1994 (age 32)
- Place of birth: Stockholm, Sweden
- Height: 1.89 m (6 ft 2 in)
- Positions: Full-back; central midfielder

Youth career
- Djurö-Vindö IF
- Hammarby IF
- –2010: Brommapojkarna
- 2011–2012: Djurgårdens IF

Senior career*
Years	Team	Apps	(Gls)
2013–2015	Djurgårdens IF	2	(0)
2015	→ Jönköpings Södra IF (loan)	22	(5)
2016	Assyriska FF	29	(5)
2017–2018	IF Brommapojkarna	49	(1)
2019–2021	Hammarby IF	42	(1)
2021–2022	Marítimo	8	(0)
2022–2024	IF Brommapojkarna	39	(2)
Total		191	(14)

International career
2013	Sweden U19	2	(0)
- * Club domestic league appearances and goals

Tim Roger Waker (né Söderström, born 4 January 1994) is a Swedish former professional footballer who played as a full-back or central midfielder.

== Career ==
Söderström joined Djurgårdens IF as a youth player from IF Brommapojkarna together with Simon Tibbling at the start of 2011. After a successful 2012 season with the U19 team, he received the "Youth Player of the Year" award from the club and moved up into the U21 team at the start of 2013. Eventually, Söderström made his senior debut in Djurgårdens IF coming on as a sub in the top Swedish division Allsvenskan against Gefle IF in the 82nd minute on 27 October 2013.

In August 2018, Söderström signed a two-year contract with Hammarby IF, thus leaving Brommapojkarna upon his contract expiration in January 2019.

On 31 January 2021, Söderström transferred from Hammarby to Marítimo in the Portuguese Primeira Liga.

On 29 July 2022, Söderström returned to Brommapojkarna on a contract until the end of 2023 season. In the 2022 season, he helped the club return to Allsvenskan.

On 1 November 2024, Waker announced that he had retired from football.

== Honours ==
Jönköpings Södra

- Superettan: 2015

Brommapojkarna

- Superettan: 2017
