= Kelvin (footballer, born 1997) =

Brazilian footballer

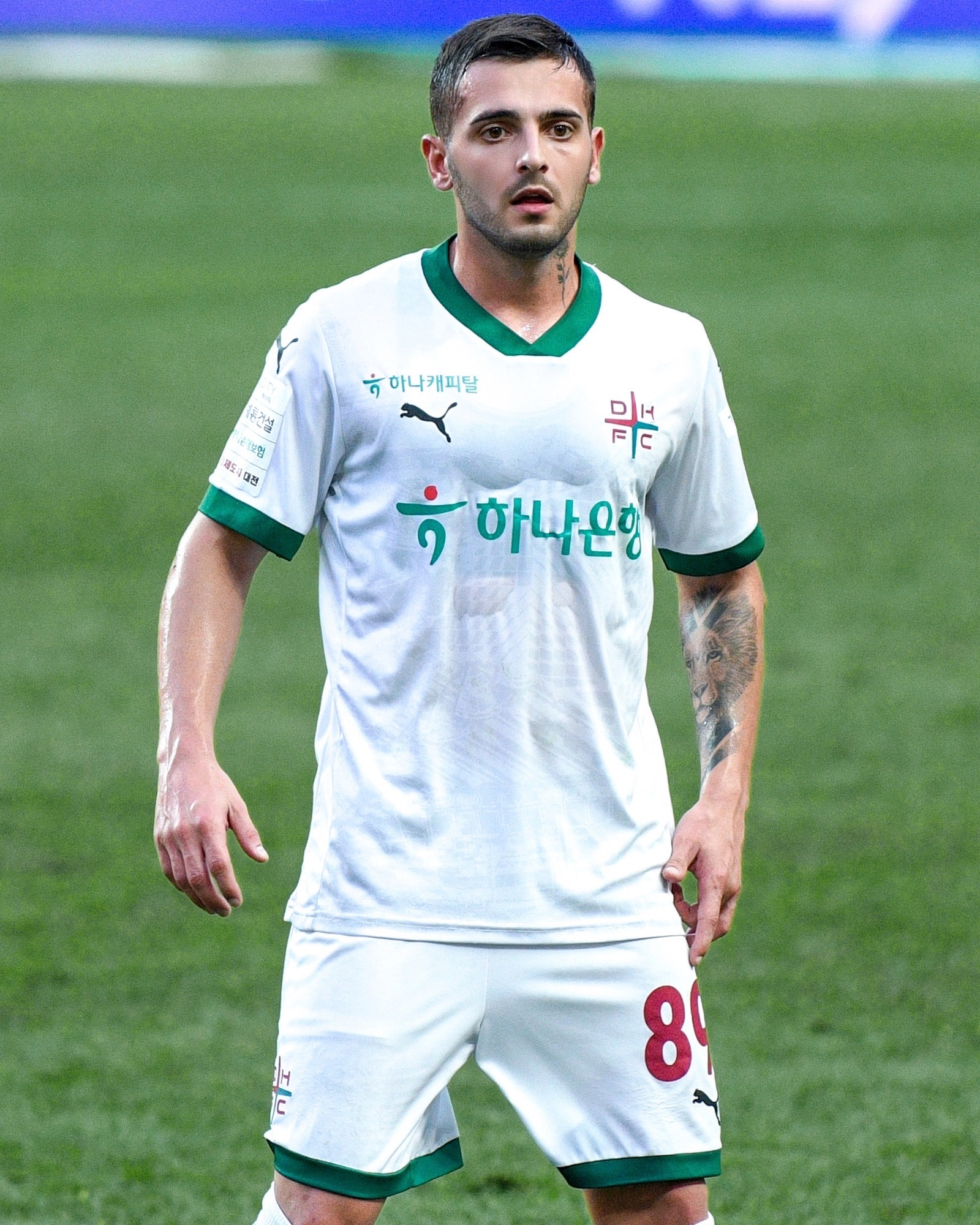
- Kelvin in 2024

Personal information
- Full name: Kelvin Giacobe Alves dos Santos
- Date of birth: 18 August 1997 (age 29)
- Place of birth: Ibarama, Brazil
- Height: 1.74 m (5 ft 9 in)
- Position: Forward

Team information
- Current team: Botafogo-SP

Youth career
- Esportivo
- 2015–2016: → Grêmio (loan)
- 2016–2017: São José-RS

Senior career*
Years	Team	Apps	(Gls)
2014–2015	Esportivo	14	(2)
2017–2018	São José-RS	36	(5)
2019	Novo Hamburgo	11	(0)
2019–2020	Botafogo-PB	24	(4)
2020	XV de Piracicaba	3	(0)
2020–2021	São José-RS	18	(0)
2021	Caxias	18	(0)
2022	ABC	28	(9)
2022–2023	Atlético Goianiense	57	(6)
2024	Ulsan HD	10	(1)
2024–2025	Daejeon Hana Citizen	14	(0)
2025	→ Atlético Goianiense (loan)	19	(2)
2026–	Botafogo-SP	33	(1)
- * Club domestic league appearances and goals as of 18 November 2026

Kelvin Giacobe Alves dos Santos (born 18 August 1997), simply known as Kelvin, is a Brazilian footballer who plays as a forward for Botafogo-SP.

== Club career ==
Born in Ibarama, Rio Grande do Sul, Kelvin made his senior debut with Esportivo before being loaned to the under-20 side of Grêmio on 11 August 2015. Upon returning, he subsequently moved to São José-RS, initially playing in the youth sides before establishing himself as a first team regular.

In December 2018, Kelvin joined Novo Hamburgo ahead of the ensuing campaign. The following 12 April, he signed for Botafogo-PB for the Série C.

Kelvin moved to XV de Piracicaba on 3 September 2020, reuniting with former Botafogo manager Evaristo Piza. On 13 October, he returned to former side São José.

On 29 April 2021, Kelvin agreed to a deal with Rio Claro, but moved to Caxias on 3 June. On 2 December, he was announced at ABC.

On 9 June 2022, ABC president confirmed the transfer of Kelvin to Série A side Atlético Goianiense, with the deal being effective on 18 July. He made his debut in the category on 21 July, coming on as a half-time substitute for Luiz Fernando and scoring his team's only in a 4–1 away loss against Athletico Paranaense.

== Career statistics ==
As of 14 September 2024

Club	Season	League			State League		Cup		Continental		Other		Total	
Club	Season	Division	Apps	Goals	Apps	Goals	Apps	Goals	Apps	Goals	Apps	Goals	Apps	Goals
Esportivo	2014	Gaúcho	—		0	0	—		—		3 (Note: Appearance(s) in Copa FGF)	0	3	0
Esportivo	2015	Gaúcho Série A2	—		14	2	—		—		—		14	2
Esportivo	Subtotal		—		14	2	—		—		3	0	17	2
São José-RS	2017	Série D	11	2	0	0	—		—		13	3	24	5
São José-RS	2018	Série D	12	2	13	1	—		—		—		25	3
São José-RS	Subtotal		23	4	13	1	—		—		13	3	49	8
Novo Hamburgo	2019	Gaúcho	—		11	0	—		—		—		11	0
Botafogo-PB	2019	Série C	15	3	—		—		—		—		15	3
Botafogo-PB	2020	Série C	3	0	6	1	1	0	—		5 (Note: Appearance(s) in Copa do Nordeste)	0	15	1
Botafogo-PB	Subtotal		18	3	6	1	1	0	—		5	0	30	4
XV de Piracicaba	2020	Paulista A2	—		3	0	—		—		—		3	0
São José-RS	2020	Série C	9	0	—		—		—		—		9	0
São José-RS	2021	Série C	0	0	9	0	—		—		—		9	0
São José-RS	Subtotal		9	0	9	0	—		—		—		18	0
Caxias	2021	Série D	18	0	—		—		—		—		18	0
ABC	2022	Série C	9	3	19	6	2	0	—		—		30	9
Atlético Goianiense	2022	Série A	11	1	—		0	0	—		—		11	1
Atlético Goianiense	2023	Série B	30	3	16	2	0	0	—		—		46	5
Atlético Goianiense	Total		41	4	16	2	0	0	—		—		57	6
Ulsan	2024	K League 1	10	1	—		0	0	0	0	—		10	1
Daejeon	2024	K League 1	5	1	—		0	0	0	0	—		5	1
Career total			133	16	91	12	3	0	0	0	21	3	248	32

== Honours ==
São José-RS

- Copa FGF: 2017

ABC

- Campeonato Potiguar: 2022
