= Anton Wede =

Swedish footballer

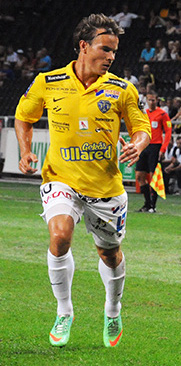

Personal information
- Full name: Anton Erik Magnus Wede
- Date of birth: 20 April 1990 (age 36)
- Place of birth: Fagersta, Sweden
- Height: 1.74 m (5 ft 8 1/2 in)
- Position: Midfielder

Team information
- Current team: Norrby
- Number: 21

Youth career
- –2005: Västanfors IF
- 2006–2010: Elfsborg

Senior career*
| Years | Team | Apps | (Gls) |
| 2010–2012 | Elfsborg | 0 | (0) |
| 2011–2012 | → Falkenberg (loan) | 26 | (7) |
| 2013–2014 | Falkenberg | 55 | (6) |
| 2015–2017 | Helsingborg | 55 | (6) |
| 2017 | GAIS | 13 | (0) |
| 2018–2021 | Falkenberg | 108 | (10) |
| 2022– | Norrby | 49 | (12) |
- * Club domestic league appearances and goals as of 30 November 2023

Anton Wede (born 20 April 1990) is a Swedish footballer who plays for Norrby as a midfielder.

== Club career ==
On 7 February 2022, Wede joined Norrby on a two-year deal.
