= Joakim Lindner =

Swedish footballer (born 1991)

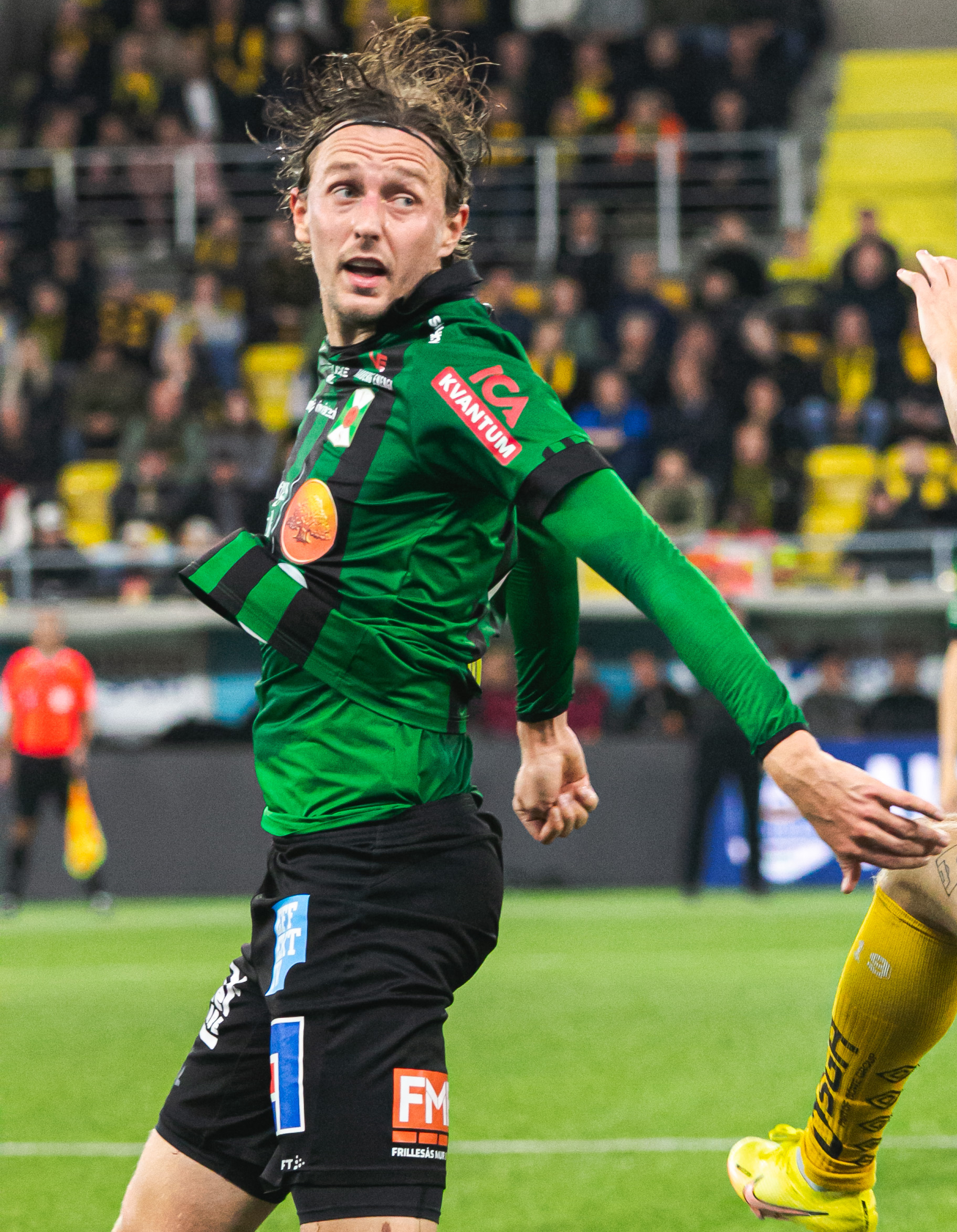

Personal information
- Full name: Joakim Magnus Bertil Lindner
- Date of birth: 22 March 1991 (age 35)
- Place of birth: Stockholm, Sweden
- Height: 1.93 m (6 ft 4 in)
- Position: Midfielder

Team information
- Current team: Varbergs BoIS
- Number: 18

Youth career
- 1996–2010: IF Brommapojkarna

Senior career*
Years	Team	Apps	(Gls)
2010–2013	IF Brommapojkarna	56	(4)
2010	→ Gröndals IK (loan)	14	(4)
2014	Östers IF	21	(0)
2015–	Varbergs BoIS	247	(13)
- * Club domestic league appearances and goals as of 11 November 2026

Joakim Lindner (born 22 March 1991) is a Swedish footballer who plays for Varbergs BoIS as a midfielder.

He is son to the competitive sailor Magnus Olsson.
