= Kim Ju-hwan (footballer, born 2001) =

Korean association football player

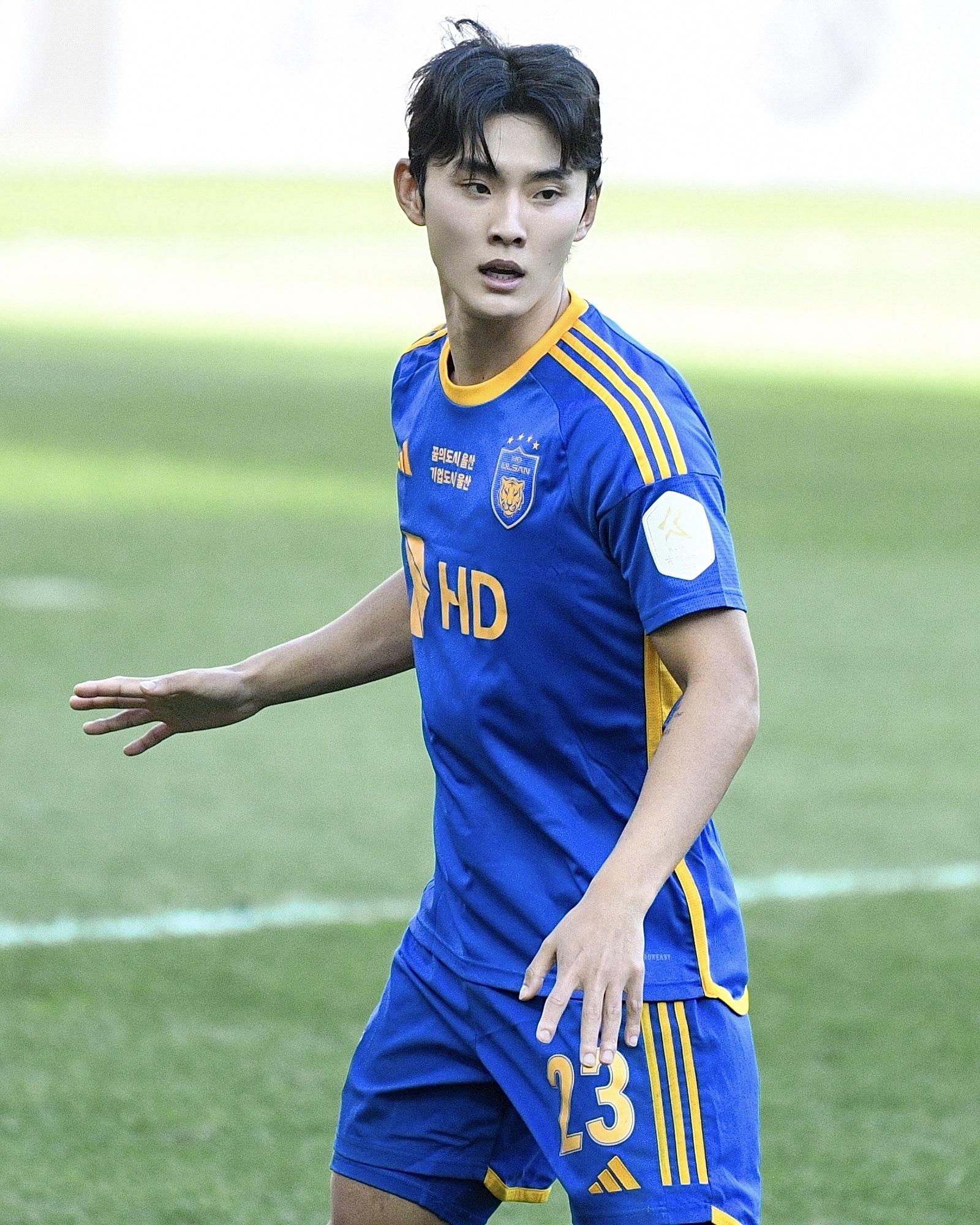
- Kim in 2024

Personal information
- Date of birth: 17 February 2001 (age 25)
- Place of birth: South Korea
- Height: 1.76 m (5 ft 9 in)
- Position: Defender

Team information
- Current team: Seoul E-Land FC
- Number: 19

Youth career
- 2011–2013: Icheon Nam Elementary School
- 2014–2016: Joongdong Middle School
- 2017–2020: Pohang Steelers

Senior career*
Years	Team	Apps	(Gls)
2020–2023	Pohang Steelers	1	(0)
2021	→ Gyeongnam FC (loan)	24	(0)
2022	→ FC Anyang (loan)	25	(0)
2023	Cheonan City FC	31	(0)
2024	Ulsan HD FC	2	(0)
2025–	Seoul E-Land FC	28	(0)
- * Club domestic league appearances and goals as of 5 August 2026

- Kim Ju-hwan
- Hangul: 김주환
- RR: Gim Juhwan
- MR: Kim Chuhwan

Kim Ju-hwan (Korean: 김주환; born 17 February 2001) is a South Korean footballer currently playing as a right back for Seoul E-Land FC.

== Early life ==
Kim was born in South Korea. He played for Incheon Nam Elementary School and Joongdong Middle school's youth teams before joining Pohang Steelers' youth team.

== Career ==
Kim made his debut for Pohang against Gwangju on 27 September 2020.

Kim made his debut for Gyeongnam against Seoul E-Land on 21 March 2021.

Kim made his debut for Anyang against Jeonnam Dragons on 19 February 2022.

Kim made his debut for Cheonan against Busan IPark on 1 March 2023.

Ju-hwan joined Ulsan HD FC in 2024.

He joined Seoul E-Land FC on 5 January 2025.

== Career statistics ==
=== Club ===
As of 20 February 2022.

Club	Season	League			Cup		Other		Total	
Club	Season	Division	Apps	Goals	Apps	Goals	Apps	Goals	Apps	Goals
Pohang Steelers	2020	K League 1	1	0	0	0	0	0	1	0
Gyeongnam FC (loan)	2021	K League 2	24	0	2	0	0	0	26	0
FC Anyang (loan)	2022	K League 2	1	0	0	0	0	0	1	0
Career total			26	0	2	0	0	0	28	0
