= Darijan Bojanić =

Swedish footballer (born 1994)

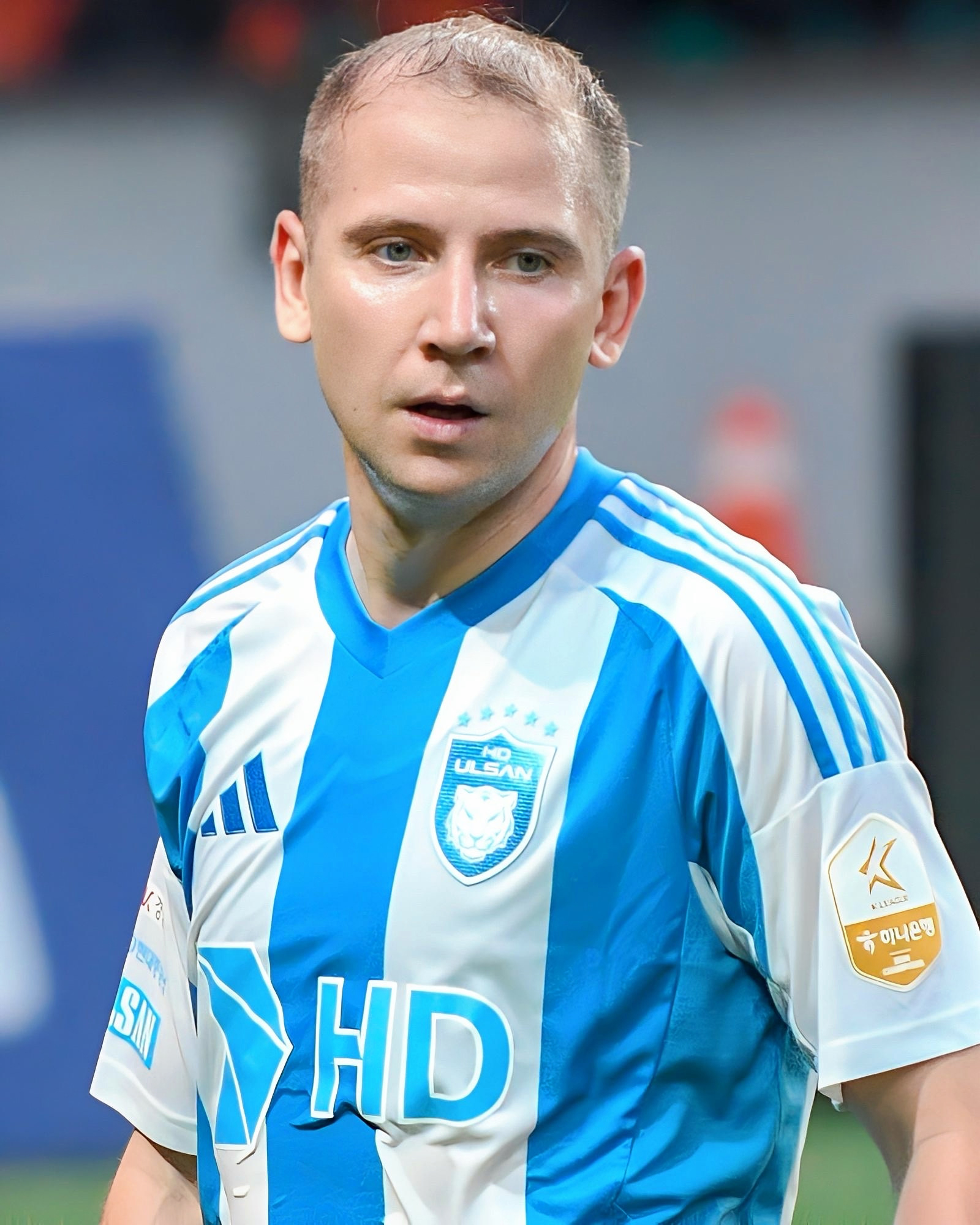
- Bojanić in 2025

Personal information
- Date of birth: 28 December 1994 (age 31)
- Place of birth: Växjö, Sweden
- Height: 1.87 m (6 ft 2 in)
- Position: Central midfielder

Team information
- Current team: Ulsan Hyundai
- Number: 6

Youth career
- –2010: Gislaveds IS

Senior career*
Years	Team	Apps	(Gls)
2010	Gislaveds IS	12	(4)
2010–2013	Östers IF	30	(0)
2013–2014	IFK Göteborg	10	(2)
2014–2018	Helsingborgs IF	96	(16)
2017	→ Östersunds FK (loan)	4	(1)
2019–2022	Hammarby IF	110	(9)
2023–	Ulsan Hyundai	81	(4)

International career^{‡}
2011	Sweden U17	4	(1)
2012–2014	Sweden U19	6	(1)
2020	Sweden	2	(0)
- * Club domestic league appearances and goals as of 3 August 2026 ‡ National team caps and goals as of 15:47, 16 January 2022 (UTC)

Darijan Bojanić (Bosnian pronunciation: [darijan bojanitɕ]; born 28 December 1994) is a Swedish professional footballer who plays as a central midfielder for K League 1 club Ulsan Hyundai.

== Early life ==
His parents fled from Bosnia and Herzegovina during the Yugoslav Wars while his mother was pregnant with him. Bojanić was born in Växjö, Sweden, and grew up in Gislaved. His mother is of Croat descent, while his father is Bosnian. Bojanić is fluent in the Bosnian language.

== Club career ==
=== Östers IF ===
In 2010, after debuting in the senior team at local club Gislaveds IS at age 16, Bojanić moved to Östers IF in Superettan, Sweden's second tier. Around that time, he also attracted interest from several European clubs, reportedly Fulham and Heerenveen. In 2012, Bojanić made 12 appearances as Öster won Superettan and got promoted to the first division.

In 2013, Bojanić made his debut in Allsvenskan, aged 18. Midway through the season, after making 14 appearances for Öster, he transferred to IFK Göteborg.

=== IFK Göteborg ===
On 2 August 2013, Bojanić signed a four-and-a-half-year contract with IFK Göteborg, but failed to make an impact at the club. He reportedly had disciplinary issues during his stay at IFK Göteborg and Bojanić later admitted that he once fell asleep during a team meeting. In total, Bojanić would only make 10 league appearances for the side.

=== Helsingborgs IF ===
On 15 July 2014, Bojanić moved to Helsingborgs IF. He reunited with his former coach from Öster, Roar Hansen, and soon established himself as a starting player at the club.

Bojanić fell out of favour with manager Henrik Larsson in 2016 after the player had criticised his coach in the media. Helsingborg got relegated to Superettan the same year. In 2017, he went on loan to Östersunds FK in Allsvenskan, but failed to make an impact, only making four league appearances for the side. He won the 2016–17 Svenska Cupen, the main domestic cup, with Östersund.

In 2018, Bojanić played 29 games, scored six goals and provided 13 assists, as Helsingborg won a promotion to Allsvenskan. At the end of the season, he was voted as Superettan Player of the Year.

=== Hammarby IF ===
==== 2019 ====
On 26 November 2018, Bojanić moved on a free transfer to Hammarby IF, signing a three-and-a-half-year contract. He played 29 games in the 2019 season, scoring four goals and providing 11 assists, the most in the league, as Hammarby finished third in the table after eight straight wins at the end of the campaign. He vas voted as Allsvenskan Player of the Month in October, and Hammarby Player of the Season by the fans at the end of the year.

==== 2020 ====
In January 2020, Bojanić signed a new three-and-a-half-year contract with Hammarby. The season was postponed due to the COVID-19 pandemic with Bojanić being in poor form and plagued by injuries, only making 23 appearances as his side disappointedly finished 8th in the table. Although, he scored from a free-kick in the first round of the 2020–21 UEFA Europa League against Puskás Akadémia (in a 3–0 win), before the club was eliminated from the tournament in the second round against Lech Poznań (in a 0–3 loss).

==== 2021 ====
On 30 May 2021, Bojanić won the 2020–21 Svenska Cupen with Hammarby, through a 5–4 win on penalties (0–0 after full-time) against BK Häcken in the final. He featured in all six games as the side reached the play-off round of the 2021–22 UEFA Europa Conference League, after eliminating Maribor (4–1 on aggregate) and FK Čukarički (6–4 on aggregate), where the club was knocked out by Basel (4–4 on aggregate) after a penalty shoot-out, in which Bojanić missed his attempt.

On 23 September 2021, Bojanić was appointed as the new club captain of Hammarby by head coach Miloš Milojević, replacing Jeppe Andersen. On 2 April 2022, Bojanić was demoted to vice-captain by new head coach Martí Cifuentes, being replaced by Richard Magyar.

==== 2022 ====
Bojanić featured in the final of the 2021–22 Svenska Cupen, in which Hammarby lost by 4–5 on penalties to Malmö FF after the game ended in a 0–0 draw. During the summer, he reportedly attracted interest from FC Zürich in the Swiss Super League, but their bid was rejected. In the league, Bojanić scored four goals in 29 appearances, often captaining his side, that ultimately finished 3rd in the Allsvenskan table. On 10 November 2022, shortly after the final game of the season, Hammarby accepted a bid from K League 1 club Ulsan Hyundai for his transfer, subject to the player's personal agreement.

=== Ulsan Hyundai ===
On 14 November 2022, Ulsan Hyundai confirmed that they had reached an agreement for his transfer, effective in January 2023.

== International career ==
Between 2011 and 2014, Bojanić won several caps for both the Swedish U17 and U19 teams.

Bojanić was called up to the Swedish senior squad for the training tour in early 2020. He made his debut in a 1–0 friendly win against Moldova on 9 January 2020. Three days later, on 12 January, he provided the assist to Simon Hedlund as Sweden won 1–0 against Kosovo. Manager Janne Andersson praised him as one of the best Swedish players during the tour.

In 2021, Bojanić confirmed that he was contemplating switching his allegiance to Bosnia and Herzegovina, where his family originally is from, pending a call-up and an application for dual citizenship.

== Style of play ==
As a deep-lying playmaker, Bojanić is known for his strong passing game and technique. He is also a set piece-specialist.

== Career statistics ==
=== Club ===
As of match played 3 August 2026

Club	Season	League			Cup		Continental		Total	
Club	Season	Division	Apps	Goals	Apps	Goals	Apps	Goals	Apps	Goals
Gislaveds IS	2010	Division 3	12	4	—		—		12	4
Gislaveds IS	Total		12	4	0	0	0	0	12	4
Östers IF	2010	Superettan	0	0	—		—		0	0
Östers IF	2011	Superettan	5	0	4	0	—		9	0
Östers IF	2012	Superettan	11	0	1	0	—		12	0
Östers IF	2013	Allsvenskan	14	0	2	0	—		16	0
Östers IF	Total		30	0	7	0	0	0	37	0
IFK Göteborg	2013	Allsvenskan	7	1	1	1	—		8	2
IFK Göteborg	2014	Allsvenskan	3	1	3	1	0	0	6	2
IFK Göteborg	Total		10	2	4	2	0	0	14	4
Helsingborgs IF	2014	Allsvenskan	11	2	0	0	—		11	2
Helsingborgs IF	2015	Allsvenskan	27	3	6	2	—		33	5
Helsingborgs IF	2016	Allsvenskan	17	3	5	2	—		22	5
Helsingborgs IF	2017	Superettan	12	2	1	0	—		13	2
Helsingborgs IF	2018	Superettan	29	6	4	0	—		33	6
Helsingborgs IF	Total		96	16	16	4	0	0	112	20
Östersunds FK (loan)	2017	Allsvenskan	4	1	2	1	—		6	2
Östersunds FK (loan)	Total		4	1	2	1	0	0	6	2
Hammarby IF	2019	Allsvenskan	29	4	3	0	—		32	4
Hammarby IF	2020	Allsvenskan	23	0	4	1	1 (Note: Appearances in UEFA Europa League)	1	28	1
Hammarby IF	2021	Allsvenskan	29	1	4	0	6 (Note: Appearances in UEFA Europa Conference League)	0	39	1
Hammarby IF	2022	Allsvenskan	29	4	7	2	—		36	6
Hammarby IF	Total		110	9	18	3	7	1	135	13
Ulsan Hyundai	2023	K League 1	9	0	2	0	2 (Note: Appearances in AFC Champions League)	0	13	0
Ulsan Hyundai	2024	K League 1	26	2	3	0	3	1	32	3
Ulsan Hyundai	2025	K League 1	26	2	2	0	7 (Note: Four appearances in AFC Champions League and 3 appearances in FIFA Club World Cup)	0	35	2
Ulsan Hyundai	2026	K League 1	20	0	0	0	2	1	22	1
Ulsan Hyundai	Total		81	4	7	0	14	2	102	6
Career total			343	36	54	10	21	3	418	49

=== International ===
As of 12 January 2020

National team	Year	Apps	Goals
Sweden	2020	2	0
Total		2	0

== Honours ==
Gislaveds IS

- Division 3 Sydvästra Götaland: 2010

Östers IF

- Superettan: 2012

Östersunds FK

- Svenska Cupen: 2016–17

Helsingborgs IF

- Superettan: 2018

Hammarby IF

- Svenska Cupen: 2020–21

Ulsan Hyundai

- K League 1: 2023, 2024

Individual

- Hammarby IF Player of the Year: 2019
- Superettan Player of the Year: 2018
- Allsvenskan top assist provider: 2019
