= 2019–20 Svenska Cupen =

Tournament details
- Country: Sweden
- Dates: 15 May 2019 – 30 July 2020
- Teams: 96 (competition proper)

Final positions
- Champions: IFK Göteborg
- Runners-up: Malmö FF

Tournament statistics
- Matches played: 119
- Top goal scorer(s): Ahmed Awad; Alexander Kačaniklić (5 goals)
- All statistics correct as of 31 July 2020.

The 2019–20 Svenska Cupen was the 64th season of the Svenska Cupen and the eighth season with the current format. The eventual champions, IFK Göteborg, secured a place in the second qualifying round of the 2020–21 UEFA Europa League. A total of 96 clubs entered the competition, 64 teams from district sites and 32 from the Allsvenskan and the Superettan.

The first rounds were played between 1 May and 6 June 2019. The first round draw was announced on 25 April 2019. Times up to October 2019 and from 31 March 2020 are CEST (UTC+2). Times from 28 October 2019 to 30 March 2020 are CET (UTC+1).

The tournament was suspended before the quarterfinals due to the COVID-19 pandemic. On 18 June 2020, following the UEFA's publication of its intended dates for the 2020–21 UEFA Europa League (for which the winner of the Svenska Cupen qualifies) on 17 June 2020, the Swedish football association announced that the 2019–20 Svenska Cupen would resume play, with quarterfinals played on 25 June 2020, semi-finals on 9 July 2020 and the final on 30 July 2020. All remaining games were to be played without any attendance and with the additional rules adopted by the Swedish football association following the pandemic, which included inter alia that all teams are allowed to make five substitutions during one game.

== Round and draw dates ==
The schedule of the competition is as follows.

Phase	Round	Draw date	Match date
Initial rounds	Round 1	24 April 2019	15 May – 3 July 2019
Initial rounds	Round 2	4 July 2019	21 – 22 August 2019
Group stage	Matchday 1	28 November 2019	15 – 24 February 2020
Group stage	Matchday 2	28 November 2019	29 February – 2 March 2020
Group stage	Matchday 3	28 November 2019	7 – 9 March 2020
Knockout stage	Quarterfinals	9 March 2020	25 June 2020
Knockout stage	Semi-finals	9 March 2020	9 July 2020
Knockout stage	Final	9 March 2020	30 July 2020

== Teams ==
Round	Clubs remaining	Clubs involved	Winners from previous round	New entries this round	Leagues participating in this round
Round 1	96	64	0	64	Division 1 (19 teams); Division 2 (29 teams); Division 3 (8 teams); Division 4 (7 teams); Division 5 (1 team)
Round 2	64	64	32	32	Allsvenskan (16 teams); Superettan (16 teams); Division 1 (14 teams); Division 2 (15 teams); Division 3 (1 team); Division 4 (2 teams)
Group stage	32	32	32	0	Allsvenskan (15 teams); Superettan (11 teams); Division 1 (5 teams); Division 2 (1 team)

== Round 1 ==
64 teams from the third tier or lower of the Swedish league system competed in this round.

15 May 2019	Gnosjö IF (5)	0–3	IFK Värnamo (3)	Gnosjö
18:30		Report	Ajdarevic 10'; Siljander 19'; Ferizi 37'	Stadium: Töllshov; Attendance: 411; Referee: Hakan Söderman

21 May 2019	Vårgårda IK (4)	1–1 (a.e.t.) (5–4 p)	Lindome GIF (3)	Vårgårda
19:00	Baker 58'	Report	Alö 65' (pen.)	Stadium: Tånga Hed; Attendance: 172; Referee: Georges Jansizjan
	Penalties
	Lager (penalty scored); Olafsson (penalty scored); Martinsson (penalty scored); Abdulrahman (penalty scored); Rundqvist (penalty scored)		Alö (penalty scored); Jigliden (penalty scored); Hedlund (penalty scored); Lagerstedt (penalty scored); Karlberg (penalty missed)

21 May 2019	IFÖ Bromölla IF (4)	0–4	Lunds BK (3)	Bromölla
19:00		Report	Balint 21'; Hofvander 30'; A. Johansson 47'; Aliti 90'	Stadium: Strandangens IP A-plan; Attendance: 122; Referee: Mohamed Rachid

21 May 2019	IK Franke (5)	0–2	Gamla Upsala SK (4)	Västerås
19:00		Report	Jalil 57'; Kumric 90'	Stadium: Råby IP 3 Attendance: 115; Referee: Erik Nordqvist

5 June 2019	KF Velebit (6)	0–2	Qviding FIF (4)	Gothenburg
18:30		Report	Tidstrand 7', 84'	Stadium: Velebit IP 1 Gras; Attendance: 250; Referee: Christer Hallén

5 June 2019	BKV Norrtälje (5)	0–4	Akropolis IF (3)	Norrtälje
19:30		Report	Lindqvist 5'; Zlotnik 47', 73'; Sosseh 66'	Stadium: Norrtälje Sportcentrum; Attendance: 110; Referee: Suhel Youssef

5 June 2019	Newroz FC (4)	2–6	Sollentuna FK (3)	Skärholmen
19:30	Törnstrand 21' (pen.); Kaarle 90'	Report	Ramsell 16'; Molinatti 35'; Streete 69'; Johansson 70', 90+2'; Löfberg 87'	Stadium: Satra Idrottsplats; Attendance: 69; Referee: Erik Skotte

6 June 2019	Vendelsö IK (6)	1–8	FC Gute (4)	Haninge
15:00	Bjurholt 36'	Report	Dahlstrom 16', 58', 61'; Jan 17', 79', 90+2' ((pen)); Wallden 54'; Nordkvist 87'	Stadium: Torvala; Attendance: 69; Referee: Jonathan Varli

8 June 2019	BK Astrio (6)	2–0	Höganäs BK (5)	Eketanga-Sondrum, Halmstad
12:00	Hansson 43'; Albrektsson 60'	Report		Stadium: Sondrums IP A Attendance: 122; Referee: Oskar Hallengren

11 June 2019	Dagsbergs IF (6)	1–0	Värmbols FC (4)	Ljunga
19:00	Eliason 63'	Report		Stadium: Dagsbergsvallen; Attendance: 89; Referee: Shayan Mollaei

12 June 2019	Assyriska BK (4)	0–5	Utsiktens BK (3)	Västra Frölunda
19:00		Report	Jernarp 31'; Skoglund 48', 49'; Skoog 50'; Bosnic 53'	Stadium: Ruddalens IP 1 Attendance: 120; Referee: Christer Hallén

12 June 2019	IK Östria Lambohov (7)	1–4	Husqvarna FF (4)	Linköping
19:00	Dahl 60'	Report	Dimitrijevic 26'; Krasniqi 43'; Koutcho 57'; Ibrahim 85'	Stadium: Lambohovsvallen; Attendance: 95; Referee: Gheorge Piscoran

12 June 2019	Råslätts SK (4)	2–0	Skövde AIK (3)	Jönköping
19:00	Hussein 37'; Lönn 64'	Report		Stadium: Råslatts IP; Attendance: 150; Referee: Barech Afzal-Khan

12 June 2019	IFK Timrå (4)	4–0	IFK Östersund (4)	Sorberge
19:00	Tägtström 22'; Nordlund 34', 59'; Hafizovic 80'	Report		Stadium: Timrå IP Konstgräs; Attendance: 50; Referee: Martin Palm

12 June 2019	Värtans IK (5)	1–2	Enskede IK (4)	Stockholm
19:45	Wahlberg 52'	Report	Stigenberg 13'; Sobrinho 50'	Stadium: Hjorthagens IP; Attendance: 50; Referee: Jonas Jonsson

12 June 2019	IFK Haninge (4)	3–3 (a.e.t.) (4–5 p)	IFK Stocksund (4)	Haninge
20:00	Nobell 53'; Sjöberg 118'; Dosis 120'	Report	Sletsjøe 90'; Ceylan 91'; Stahl 120+1'	Stadium: Torvalla IP 1 Attendance: 100; Referee: Jasmin Svraka
	Penalties
	Riahi (penalty scored); Nobell (penalty scored); Yasar (penalty missed); Sjöberg (penalty scored); Amoah (penalty scored)		Ceylan (penalty scored); Nilsson (penalty scored); Ahlstrand (penalty scored); Grönborg (penalty scored); Andue (penalty scored)

25 June 2019	IFK Luleå (4)	3–3 (a.e.t.) (4–3 p)	Umeå FC (3)	Luleå
19:00	Vigerbäck 27'; Nouri 46'; Wårell 84'	Report	Kadhim 18', 43', 90'	Stadium: Skogsvallen; Attendance: 368; Referee: Pontus Olofsson
	Penalties
	Olausson (penalty scored); Oksarsson (penalty scored); Olsson (penalty missed); Assam (penalty scored); Nouri (penalty missed); Pettersen (penalty scored)		Wikström (penalty scored); Edegware (penalty missed); Stigedahl (penalty scored); Eriksson (penalty missed); Yeboah (penalty scored); Ziara (penalty missed)

25 June 2019	Hässleholms IF (4)	2–6	Torns IF (3)	Hässleholm
19:00	Ströbeck 34'; Wedenell 25'	Report	Sulaiman 29', 45'; Åkerlund 31'; Lundberg 46', 59'; Ahlgren 83'	Stadium: Österas IP A-plan; Referee: Dino Demo

25 June 2019	Eneby BK (5)	0–3	Oskarshamns AIK (3)	Norrköping
19:00		Report	Christensson 28' (pen.), 60'; Eliassi 90+3'	Stadium: MAXIvallen; Attendance: 85; Referee: Jovan Krsmanovic

25 June 2019	Grebbestads IF (4)	0–4	FC Trollhättan (3)	Grebbestads
19:00		Report	Mogren 4', 26'; Rexhepi 75'; Karlsson 89'	Stadium: Siljevi 1 11-manna Attendance: 325; Referee: Admir Hasanbegovic

26 June 2019	Växjö United FC (5)	0–3; Awarded	FK Karlskrona (4)
19:00		Report

26 June 2019	Gottne IF (4)	3–1	Hudiksvalls FF (4)	Gottne
19:00	Mawira 8'; Larsson 36'; Abubakari 79'	Report	Eliasson 14'	Stadium: Haraldsängen 1 Attendance: 220; Referee: Magnus Wiklund

26 June 2019	Tågarps AIK (6)	1–3	FC Rosengård 1917 (4)	Svalöv
19:00	Lindström 30'	Report	Cloria 52'; Burrniku 64'; Malicevic 67'	Stadium: Tagarps IP A-plan; Attendance: 105; Referee: Bobby Sjögren-Engels

26 June 2019	Nyköpings BIS (3)	2–2 (a.e.t.) (4–2 p)	Vasalunds IF (3)	Nyköping
19:00	Alp 36'; Benker 85'	Report	Karku 9'; Mushitu 78'	Stadium: Rosvalla IP KG A Referee: Jasmin Svraka
	Penalties
	Nordenberg (penalty scored); Wickman (penalty scored); E. Ahmetovic (penalty scored); Benker (penalty scored)		Bulut (penalty scored); M. Traore (penalty scored); Doumbia (penalty missed); Traoré (penalty missed)

29 June 2019	Vattholma IF (6)	1–5	Forssa BK (5)	Uppsala
15:00	Övragård 75'	Report	Abic 19'; Ingesson 48'; Abdi 72'; Abika 73'; Younis 88'	Stadium: Änglavallen; Attendance: 357; Referee: Dejan Lukacevic

1 July 2019	Vänersborgs IF (4)	1–2 (a.e.t.)	IK Gauthiod (4)	Vänersborg
19:00	Own Goal 3'	Report	Forsblad 60'; Nilsson 91'	Stadium: Vänersvallen Nord; Referee: Joseph Matti

2 July 2019	IFK Mora FK (4)	0–2	Sandvikens IF (3)	Mora
19:00		Report	Mohammed 70'; Aspgren 90+2'	Stadium: Prästholmens IP; Attendance: 128; Referee: Patrik Larsson

2 July 2019	Vinbergs IF (4)	0–1	Tvååkers IF (3)	Vinberg
19:00		Report	Berggren 39'	Stadium: Vinåvallen A Attendance: 250; Referee: Ahmed Al-Kodri

2 July 2019	Carlstad United BK (3)	5–0	Rynninge IK (3)	Molkom
19:00	Almqvist 39'; McNeil 44'; Rhöse 58'; Nyman 60'; Lashkari 79'	Report		Stadium: Molkoms IP; Attendance: 486; Referee: Erik Nordqvist

3 July 2019	IFK Lidingö FK (4)	1–0	Karlbergs BK (4)	Lidingö
19:00	Aguirre 29'	Report		Stadium: Lidingövallen 2 Attendance: 85; Referee: Daniel Alamidi

3 July 2019	Hittarps IK (4)	0–1	Eskilsminne IF (3)	Helsingborg
19:00		Report	Åberg 80'	Stadium: Larods IP A-plan; Attendance: 314; Referee: Oscar Johnson

3 July 2019	Högsäters GF (6)	0–2	Karlstad BK (3)	Högsäter
19:00		Report	Johansson 34'; Edvardsen 60'	Stadium: Genevi IP 1 Attendance: 350; Referee: Philip Lindh

== Round 2 ==
64 teams will compete in this round: 32 winners from Round 1 and the 32 teams from the 2019 Allsvenskan and 2019 Superettan. All games will be played on August 21–22, 2019.

=== Seeding ===
Section	Seeded teams		Unseeded teams	
North	AFC Eskilstuna (1)	IFK Norrköping (1)	Akropolis IF (3)	IFK Timrå (4)
North	AIK (1)	IK Brage (2)	Dagsbergs IF (6)	Nyköpings BIS (3)
North	Dalkurd FF (2)	IK Frej (2)	Enskede IK (4)	Sollentuna FK (3)
North	Degerfors IF (2)	IK Sirius (1)	FC Gute (4)	Forssa BK (5)
North	Djurgårdens IF (1)	Syrianska FC (2)	Gamla Upsala SK (4)	Carlstad United BK (3)
North	GIF Sundsvall (1)	Västerås SK (2)	Gottne IF (4)	Karlstad BK (3)
North	Hammarby IF (1)	Örebro SK (1)	IFK Luleå (4)	IFK Lidingö FK (4)
North	IF Brommapojkarna (2)	Östersunds FK (1)	IFK Stocksund (4)	Sandvikens IF (3)
South	BK Häcken (1)	Kalmar FF (1)	BK Astrio (6)	Eskilsminne IF (3)
South	Falkenbergs FF (1)	Malmö FF (1)	FC Rosengård 1917 (4)	FC Trollhättan (3)
South	GAIS (2)	Mjällby AIF (2)	FK Karlskrona (4)	Husqvarna FF (4)
South	Halmstads BK (2)	Norrby IF (2)	IFK Värnamo (3)	IK Gauthiod (4)
South	Helsingborgs IF (1)	Trelleborgs FF (2)	Lunds BK (3)	Oskarshamns AIK (3)
South	IF Elfsborg (1)	Varbergs BoIS (2)	Qviding FIF (4)	Råslätts SK (4)
South	IFK Göteborg (1)	Örgryte IS (2)	Torns IF (3)	Tvååkers IF (3)
South	Jönköpings Södra IF (2)	Östers IF (2)	Utsiktens BK (3)	Vårgårda IK (4)

=== Matches ===
14 August 2019	IFK Stocksund (4)	0–1	Östersunds FK (1)	Stocksund, Stockholm
18:30		Report	Colkett 20'	Stadium: Danderyd Arena; Attendance: 1,000; Referee: Fredrik Hansson

14 August 2019	Carlstad United BK (3)	2–3	AFC Eskilstuna (1)	Karlstad
18:30	Nyman 23'; Sachs 37'	Report	Kozica 43', 74'; Nalic 61'	Stadium: Tingvalla IP; Attendance: 460; Referee: Martin Segerud

14 August 2019	Lunds BK (3)	0–1	Varbergs BoIS (2)	Lund
18:30		Report	Karlsson 58'	Stadium: Klostergårdens IP; Attendance: 100; Referee: Fredrik Klitte

21 August 2019	Qviding FIF (4)	1–3	BK Häcken (1)	Gothenburg
18:00	Lindberg 74'	Report	Paulinho 35' (pen.), 84'; Yasin 90+2'	Stadium: Valhalla IP; Attendance: 789; Referee: Joakim Östling

21 August 2019	Tvååkers IF (3)	2–0	Trelleborgs FF (2)	Tvååker
18:00	Adolfsson 13'; Johansson 61'	Report		Stadium: Övrevi IP; Attendance: 473; Referee: Almir Kadirić

21 August 2019	Råslätts SK (4)	0–1	GAIS (2)	Jönköping
18:00		Report	Saebbö 20'	Stadium: Råslätts IP; Attendance: 212; Referee: Linuz Söderberg

21 August 2019	Karlstad BK (3)	1–1 (a.e.t.) (3–5 p)	IK Sirius (1)	Karlstad
18:30	Henriksson 99'	Report	Björkström 120+1'	Stadium: Tingvalla IP; Attendance: 1,152; Referee: Enzo Vesprini

21 August 2019	Forssa BK (5)	2–4	Syrianska FC (2)	Borlänge
18:30	Ali 4'; Ernström 19'	Report	Tjärnberg 31' (o.g.); Rajalakso 44'; Genc 50'; Rashidi 90'	Stadium: Domnarvsvallen; Attendance: 527; Referee: Richard Sundell

21 August 2019	Gottne IF (4)	2–4 (a.e.t.)	IF Brommapojkarna (2)	Gottne
18:30	Harmon 50' (pen.); Johnson 80'	Report	Linnér 44', 93'; Liliu 65'; Omondi 116'	Stadium: Haraldsängen 1 Attendance: 1,029; Referee: Henrik Molin

21 August 2019	Gamla Upsala SK (4)	1–3	Västerås SK (2)	Uppsala
18:30	Mellberg 90+2'	Report	Johansson 25', 63'; Tsouka Dozi 43'	Stadium: Lötens IP; Attendance: 219; Referee: Rambod Beigi

21 August 2019	Sollentuna FK (3)	4–3	Degerfors IF (2)	Sollentuna
18:30	Ekroth 5' (o.g.); Pishdari 83', 89'; Lagerbielke 86'	Report	Granath 36'; Carlén 46'; Okon 54'	Stadium: Sollentunavallen; Attendance: 450; Referee: Tom Ghorbani

21 August 2019	IFK Lidingö FK (4)	1–3 (a.e.t.)	GIF Sundsvall (1)	Lidingö
18:30	Boltegård Blom 90+1'	Report	Mas 69', 106'; Berg 120+6'	Stadium: Lidingövallen; Attendance: 1,778; Referee: Johan Krantz

21 August 2019	Torns IF (3)	1–2 (a.e.t.)	Jönköpings Södra IF (2)	Stångby
18:30	Östlund 46'	Report	Thelin 65', 112'	Stadium: Stångby IP; Attendance: 418; Referee: Per Melin

21 August 2019	FC Rosengård 1917 (4)	1–2	Kalmar FF (1)	Rosengård, Malmö
18:30	Sakirovski 79'	Report	Rafael 19', 34'	Stadium: Rosengårds IP; Attendance: 480; Referee: Robert Daradić

21 August 2019	Husqvarna FF (4)	0–4	Mjällby AIF (2)	Huskvarna
18:30		Report	Pärsson 52'; Georges 56'; Omoh 79'; Halvadžić 90'	Stadium: Vapenvallen; Attendance: 246; Referee: Robin Andersson

21 August 2019	Utsiktens BK (3)	0–1	Örgryte IS (2)	Västra Frölunda, Gothenburg
18:30		Report	Zanjanchi 4'	Stadium: Ruddalens IP; Attendance: 1,091; Referee: Haris Memišević

21 August 2019	Eskilsminne IF (3)	1–0	Norrby IF (2)	Helsingborg
18:30	Christoffersson 86'	Report		Stadium: Harlyckans IP; Attendance: 224; Referee: Rinon Hasani

21 August 2019	FK Karlskrona (4)	2–1	Östers IF (2)	Karlskrona
18:30	Hansson 36'; Enarsson 45+3'	Report	Johannesson 56'	Stadium: Västra Mark IP; Attendance: 649; Referee: Andreas Johansson

21 August 2019	FC Trollhättan (3)	1–2	Halmstads BK (2)	Trollhättan
18:30	Berntsson 16'	Report	Karim 59'; Karlsson 87' (o.g.)	Stadium: Edsborgs IP; Attendance: 571; Referee: Antti Kanerva

21 August 2019	FC Gute (4)	2–4	Dalkurd FF (2)	Visby
18:30	Dahlström 18'; Rynell 52'	Report	Moënza 16'; Awad 27', 62'; Berger 89' (pen.)	Stadium: Gutavallen; Attendance: 617; Referee: Ozan Cambilel

21 August 2019	Nyköpings BIS (3)	0–1	Örebro SK (1)	Nyköping
18:30		Report	Prodell 45+1'	Stadium: Rosvalla IP; Attendance: 387; Referee: Fredrik Hansson

21 August 2019	Sandvikens IF (3)	2–1	IK Frej (2)	Sandviken
18:30	Hägg 82' (pen.); Koidan 84'	Report	Zé Vitor 58'	Stadium: Jernvallen; Attendance: 540; Referee: Mohamed Nablsi

21 August 2019	IFK Luleå (4)	1–3	Hammarby IF (1)	Luleå
18:30	Olausson 29' (pen.)	Report	Đurđić 9'; Tanković 12'; Kačaniklić 68'	Stadium: Skogsvallen; Attendance: 3,935; Referee: Tess Olofsson

21 August 2019	IFK Timrå (4)	1–6	IFK Norrköping (1)	Timrå
18:30	Nordlund 59'	Report	Holmberg 33'; Kusu 39'; Bergmann Jóhannesson 45'; Blomqvist 56'; Álvarez 78'; Björk 90+2'	Stadium: Timrå IP; Attendance: 1,025; Referee: Arian Chalak

22 August 2019	IK Gauthiod (4)	1–3 (a.e.t.)	IF Elfsborg (1)	Grästorp
18:30	R. Nilsson 70'	Report	Ishizaki 44', 119'; Karlsson 105'	Stadium: Lunnevi IP; Attendance: 311; Referee: Fredrick Oppong

22 August 2019	Vårgårda IK (4)	0–4	Falkenbergs FF (1)	Vårgårda
18:30		Report	Söderström 15'; Peter 56', 58'; Sylisufaj 90'	Stadium: Tånga Hed IP; Attendance: 422; Referee: Kristoffer Karlsson

22 August 2019	Akropolis IF (3)	1–2	Djurgårdens IF (1)	Spånga, Stockholm
18:30	Lindqvist 85'	Report	Radetinac 5'; Pettersson 8'	Stadium: Spånga IP; Attendance: 1,680; Referee: Victor Wolf

22 August 2019	Oskarshamns AIK (3)	2–1	Helsingborgs IF (1)	Oskarshamn
18:30	Persson 69'; Christensson 84' (pen.)	Report	Weberg 39' (pen.)	Stadium: Arena Oskarshamn; Attendance: 568; Referee: Albert Mustafa

22 August 2019	BK Astrio (6)	0–4	IFK Göteborg (1)	Halmstad
18:00	<	Report	Abraham 31'; Sana 59'; Vibe 66'; Vilhelmsson 87'	Stadium: Söndrums IP A Attendance: 1,857; Referee: Daniel Böcker

22 August 2019	Dagsbergs IF (6)	0–12	IK Brage (2)	Ljunga
18:30		Report	Lundbäck 8', 29', 53'; Sellin 14', 27'; Ekblad 31'; A. Lundin 49'; Stenberg 62'; Jonsson 69'; Zetterström 71'; O. Lundin 76'; Andersson 89'	Stadium: Dagsbergsvallen; Attendance: 350; Referee: David Almgren

9 November 2019	Enskede IK (4)	0–7	AIK (1)	Solna
14:00		Report	Larsson 23'; Elyounoussi 30', 39', 60'; Stigenberg 45+1' (o.g.); Hussein 84' (pen.); Strannegård 89'	Stadium: Friends Arena; Attendance: 4,039; Referee: Richard Sundell

10 November 2019	IFK Värnamo (3)	0–2	Malmö FF (1)	Värnamo
16:00		Report	Berget 57'; Molins 62'	Stadium: Finnvedsvallen; Attendance: 2,975; Referee: Robert Daradić

== Group stage ==
The 32 winners from round 2 will be divided into eight groups of four teams. The 16 highest ranked winners from the previous rounds will be seeded to the top two positions in each group and the 16 remaining winners will be unseeded in the draw. The ranking of the 16 seeded teams will be decided by league position in the 2019 season. All teams in the group stage will play each other once, the highest-ranked teams from the previous rounds and teams from tier three or lower will have the right to play two home matches.

=== Group 1 ===
Pos	Team	Pld	W	D	L	GF	GA	GD	Pts	Qualification	MJÄ	DJU	DAL	SAN
1	Mjällby AIF	3	3	0	0	10	2	+8	9	Advance to Knockout stage			5–0	
2	Djurgårdens IF	3	1	1	1	6	6	0	4		1–2		3–2	
3	Dalkurd FF	3	1	0	2	5	9	−4	3					3–1
4	Sandvikens IF	3	0	1	2	4	8	−4	1		1–3	2–2		

Source: Swedish Football Association
Rules for classification: 1) Points; 2) Goal difference; 3) Goals scored; 4) Head-to-head record; 5) Highest ranked team

22 February 2020 Matchday 1	Djurgårdens IF	3–2	Dalkurd FF	Stockholm
12:30 (UTC+1)	Kujović 18', 23'; Holmberg 31'	Report	Cissoko 43'; Kabashi (yellow card) 59'; Berggren 78'	Stadium: Tele2 Arena; Attendance: 7,047; Referee: Martin Strömbergsson

22 February 2020 Matchday 1	Sandvikens IF	1–3	Mjällby AIF	Sandviken
12:30 (UTC+1)	Englund 35'	Report	Björkander 61'; Bergström 80'; Silverholt 90+4'	Stadium: Jernvallen 1 Konstgräs; Attendance: 439; Referee: Johan Krantz

2 March 2020 Matchday 2	Sandvikens IF	2–2	Djurgårdens IF	Sandviken
19:00 (UTC+1)	Koidan 80'; Englund 87'; Engqvist (yellow card) 90+3'	Report	Karlström 7'; Ulvestad 18'	Stadium: Göransson Arena; Attendance: 4,223; Referee: Enzo Vesprini

2 March 2020 Matchday 2	Mjällby AIF	5–0	Dalkurd FF	Hällevik
19:00 (UTC+1)	Moro 8', 17', 20'; Löfquist 42'; Watson (yellow card) 68'; Silverholt 82'; Petersson (yellow card) 82'	Report		Stadium: Strandvallen A-plan; Attendance: 350; Referee: Mohammadreza Faghani

7 March 2020 Matchday 3	Dalkurd FF	3–1	Sandvikens IF	Uppsala
14:30 (UTC+1)	Stensson 8'; Igbarumah 45+2'; Cissoko 62'; Clemons (yellow card) 79'	Report	Koidan (yellow card) 7'; Lindgren (yellow card) 43'; Mohammed 84'	Stadium: Lötens IP Konstgräs; Referee: Fredrik Hansson

7 March 2020 Matchday 3	Djurgårdens IF	1–2	Mjällby AIF	Stockholm
14:30 (UTC+1)	Augustinsson 16' (yellow card) 41'	Report	Löfquist (yellow card) 15'; Moro 29'; Löfgren 70'; Eriksson (yellow card) 75'	Stadium: Tele2 Arena; Attendance: 7,075; Referee: Kaspar Sjöberg

=== Group 2 ===
Pos	Team	Pld	W	D	L	GF	GA	GD	Pts	Qualification	MFF	AFC	SYR	FKK
1	Malmö FF	3	3	0	0	13	1	+12	9	Advance to Knockout stage		3–0	8–0	
2	AFC Eskilstuna	3	1	1	1	7	5	+2	4				6–1	
3	Syrianska FC	3	1	0	2	6	15	−9	3					5–1
4	FK Karlskrona	3	0	1	2	3	8	−5	1		1–2	1–1		

Source: Swedish Football Association
Rules for classification: 1) Points; 2) Goal difference; 3) Goals scored; 4) Head-to-head record; 5) Highest ranked team

15 February 2020 Matchday 1	Malmö FF	8–0	Syrianska FC	Malmö
16:00 (UTC+1)	Antonsson 6', 47'; Larsson 21'; Traustason 22'; Nalić 50'; Gall 67'; Vagić 69'; Molins 88'	Report		Stadium: Malmö IP; Attendance: 3569; Referee: Adam Ladebäck

23 February 2020 Matchday 1	FK Karlskrona	1–1	AFC Eskilstuna	Jämjö
14:30 (UTC+1)	Hansson 66'	Report	Lushaku 38'	Stadium: Jämjö IP; Attendance: 470; Referee: Per Melin

1 March 2020 Matchday 2	FK Karlskrona	1–2	Malmö FF	Karlskrona
14:30 (UTC+1)	Petersson 26'	Report	Molins 55'; Knudsen 80'	Stadium: Västra Mark IP; Attendance: TBA; Referee: Fredrik Klitte

1 March 2020 Matchday 2	AFC Eskilstuna	6–1	Syrianska FC	Eskilstuna
14:30 (UTC+1)	Loeper 9', 31', 90+3'; Nnamani 11'; Rossi 55', 82'	Report	Ceylan 79'	Stadium: Tunavallen; Attendance: 217; Referee: Richard Sundell

8 March 2020 Matchday 3	Syrianska FC	5–1	FK Karlskrona	Södertälje
14:30 (UTC+1)	Durmaz 38', 83'; Katourgi 55', 73', 76'	Report	Kangeman 16'	Stadium: Södertälje Fotbollsarena; Attendance: 65; Referee: Mohammadreza Faghani

8 March 2020 Matchday 3	Malmö FF	3–0	AFC Eskilstuna	Malmö
14:30 (UTC+1)	Christiansen 70'; Nielsen 82'; Larsson 89'	Report		Stadium: Malmö IP; Attendance: 3,469; Referee: Kristoffer Karlsson

=== Group 3 ===
Pos	Team	Pld	W	D	L	GF	GA	GD	Pts	Qualification	HAM	VAR	BP	SUN
1	Hammarby IF	3	3	0	0	11	1	+10	9	Advance to Knockout stage		5–1		4–0
2	Varbergs BoIS	3	1	1	1	6	7	−1	4				1–1	
3	IF Brommapojkarna	3	0	2	1	3	5	−2	2		0–2			
4	GIF Sundsvall	3	0	1	2	3	10	−7	1			1–4	2–2	

Source: Swedish Football Association
Rules for classification: 1) Points; 2) Goal difference; 3) Goals scored; 4) Head-to-head record; 5) Highest ranked team

24 February 2020 Matchday 1	Hammarby IF	5–1	Varbergs BoIS	Stockholm
19:00 (UTC+1)	Jóhannsson 19', 57'; Kačaniklić 27', 52'; Tanković 90+2'	Report	Johansson 66'	Stadium: Tele2 Arena; Attendance: 14518; Referee: Victor Wolf

24 February 2020 Matchday 1	GIF Sundsvall	2–2	IF Brommapojkarna	Sundsvall
19:00 (UTC+1)	Engblom 23'; Costa 34'	Report	Abraham 11'; Lepik 67'	Stadium: Nordichallen; Attendance: 400; Referee: Enzo Vesprini

1 March 2020 Matchday 2	IF Brommapojkarna	0–2	Hammarby IF	Stockholm
16:30 (UTC+1)		Report	Khalili 2'; Kačaniklić 58'	Stadium: Grimsta IP 1 Attendance: 3186; Referee: Mohammed Al-Hakim

1 March 2020 Matchday 2	GIF Sundsvall	1–4	Varbergs BoIS	Sundsvall
16:30 (UTC+1)	Olsson 34'	Report	Seljmani 16', 89'; Johansson 35'; Norlin 90+3'	Stadium: NP3 Arena; Attendance: TBA; Referee: Johan Krantz

8 March 2020 Matchday 3	Varbergs BoIS	1–1	IF Brommapojkarna	Varberg
12:30 (UTC+1)	Matthews 37'	Report	Arvidsson 50' (pen.)	Stadium: Håstens IP konstgräs Attendance: 283; Referee: TBA

8 March 2020 Matchday 3	Hammarby IF	4–0	GIF Sundsvall	Stockholm
12:30 (UTC+1)	Jóhannsson 46'; Bojanić 56'; Kačaniklić 73'; Tanković 87'	Report		Stadium: Tele2 Arena; Attendance: 14,350; Referee: Martin Strömbergsson

=== Group 4 ===
Pos	Team	Pld	W	D	L	GF	GA	GD	Pts	Qualification	AIK	KAL	JÖN	ÖIS
1	AIK	3	2	1	0	6	3	+3	7	Advance to Knockout stage		3–1	2–2	
2	Kalmar FF	3	2	0	1	9	3	+6	6				5–0	3–0
3	Jönköpings Södra IF	3	1	1	1	4	7	−3	4					2–0
4	Örgryte IS	3	0	0	3	0	6	−6	0		0–1			

Source: Swedish Football Association
Rules for classification: 1) Points; 2) Goal difference; 3) Goals scored; 4) Head-to-head record; 5) Highest ranked team

23 February 2020 Matchday 1	AIK	2–2	Jönköpings Södra IF	Solna
12:30 (UTC+1)	Ofori 79'; Goitom 81'	Report	Kozica 69' (pen.); Hamidovic 74'	Stadium: Skytteholms IP; Attendance: 4923; Referee: Bojan Pandžić

23 February 2020 Matchday 1	Kalmar FF	3–0	Örgryte IS	Kalmar
12:30 (UTC+1)	Sachpekidis 12'; Magnusson 29', 71'	Report		Stadium: Gasten IP; Attendance: 607; Referee: Fredrik Klitte

1 March 2020 Matchday 2	Örgryte IS	0–1	AIK	Gothenburg
14:30 (UTC+1)		Report	32' (o.g.)	Stadium: Bravida Arena; Attendance: 2111; Referee: Kaspar Sjöberg

1 March 2020 Matchday 2	Kalmar FF	5–0	Jönköpings Södra IF	Kalmar
14:30 (UTC+1)	Fröling 3', 33'; Jansson 13', 29'; Elm 79'	Report		Stadium: Gasten IP; Attendance: 712; Referee: Robert Daradic

9 March 2020 Matchday 3	Jönköpings Södra IF	2–0	Örgryte IS	Jönköping
19:00 (UTC+1)	Kozica 33'; 39' (o.g.)	Report		Stadium: Tipshallen Elmia; Attendance: 362; Referee: Granit Maqedonci

9 March 2020 Matchday 3	AIK	3–1	Kalmar FF	Solna
19:00 (UTC+1)	Ylätupa 45+3', 71'; Asani 79'	Report	Aliti 76'	Stadium: Skytteholms IP; Attendance: 5,026; Referee: Mohammed Al-Hakim

=== Group 5 ===
Pos	Team	Pld	W	D	L	GF	GA	GD	Pts	Qualification	FAL	NOR	HBK	TVÅ
1	Falkenbergs FF	3	2	0	1	4	2	+2	6	Advance to Knockout stage			1–0	
2	IFK Norrköping	3	2	0	1	3	2	+1	6		1–0		1–0	
3	Halmstads BK	3	1	0	2	2	3	−1	3					2–1
4	Tvååkers IF	3	1	0	2	4	6	−2	3		1–3	2–1		

Source: Swedish Football Association
Rules for classification: 1) Points; 2) Goal difference; 3) Goals scored; 4) Head-to-head record; 5) Highest ranked team

23 February 2020 Matchday 1	IFK Norrköping	1–0	Halmstads BK	Norrköping
14:30 (UTC+1)	Björk 38'	Report		Stadium: Östgötaporten; Attendance: 3012; Referee: Mohammed Al-Hakim

23 February 2020 Matchday 1	Tvååkers IF	1–3	Falkenbergs FF	Tvååker
14:30 (UTC+1)	Zeqiri 71'	Report	Peter 16', 67'; Carlsson 61'	Stadium: Övrevi C Attendance: 702; Referee: Richard Sundell

1 March 2020 Matchday 2	Tvååkers IF	2–1	IFK Norrköping	Tvååker
12:30 (UTC+1)	Adolfsson 69'; Svensson 86'	Report	Björk 41'	Stadium: Övrevi C Attendance: 356; Referee: Antti Kanerva

1 March 2020 Matchday 2	Falkenbergs FF	1–0	Halmstads BK	Vinberg
12:30 (UTC+1)	Sylisufaj 77'	Report		Stadium: Vinåvallen B Attendance: 450; Referee: Magnus Lindgren

7 March 2020 Matchday 3	Halmstads BK	2–1	Tvååkers IF	Halmstad
16:30 (UTC+1)		Report		Stadium: Skedalaheds IP 3 Attendance: TBA; Referee: Fredrik Klitte

7 March 2020 Matchday 3	IFK Norrköping	1–0	Falkenbergs FF	Norrköping
16:30 (UTC+1)	Hakšabanović 68'	Report		Stadium: Östgötaporten; Attendance: 2,585; Referee: Glenn Nyberg

=== Group 6 ===
Pos	Team	Pld	W	D	L	GF	GA	GD	Pts	Qualification	HÄC	ÖFK	GAIS	ESK
1	BK Häcken	3	3	0	0	9	0	+9	9	Advance to Knockout stage		2–0	3–0	
2	Östersunds FK	3	2	0	1	9	2	+7	6				4–0	
3	GAIS	3	1	0	2	4	8	−4	3					4–1
4	Eskilsminne IF	3	0	0	3	1	13	−12	0		0–4	0–5		

Source: Swedish Football Association
Rules for classification: 1) Points; 2) Goal difference; 3) Goals scored; 4) Head-to-head record; 5) Highest ranked team

23 February 2020 Matchday 1	BK Häcken	3–0	GAIS	Gothenburg
16:30 (UTC+1)	Lundberg 13'; Irandust 27'; Yasin 80'	Report		Stadium: Bravida Arena; Attendance: 2661; Referee: Glenn Nyberg

23 February 2020 Matchday 1	Eskilsminne IF	0–5	Östersunds FK	Helsingborg
16:30 (UTC+1)		Report	Löfvenmark 4' (o.g.); Kroon 7'; Kadiri 49'; Mukiibi 81'; Hörberg 83'	Stadium: Olympiafältet Plan 10 konstgräs Attendance: 252; Referee: Andreas Ekberg

29 February 2020 Matchday 2	Eskilsminne IF	0–4	BK Häcken	Helsingborg
14:30 (UTC+1)		Report	Toivio 45', 56'; Youssef 83'; Yasin 89'	Stadium: Olympiafältet Plan 10 konstgräs Attendance: 178; Referee: Kristoffer Karlsson

29 February 2020 Matchday 2	Östersunds FK	4–0	GAIS	Östersund
14:30 (UTC+1)	Kadiri 20', 40', 52'; Kroon 33' (pen.)	Report		Stadium: Jämtkraft Arena; Attendance: 1954; Referee: Farouk Nehdi

8 March 2020 Matchday 3	GAIS	4–1	Eskilsminne IF	Gothenburg
14:30 (UTC+1)		Report		Stadium: Valhalla 1 Konstgräs; Attendance: 501; Referee: Robert Daradic

8 March 2020 Matchday 3	BK Häcken	2–0	Östersunds FK	Gothenburg
14:30 (UTC+1)	Irandust 8'; Ekpolo 35'	Report		Stadium: Bravida Arena; Attendance: 1,145; Referee: Joakim Östling

=== Group 7 ===
Pos	Team	Pld	W	D	L	GF	GA	GD	Pts	Qualification	IFKG	VSK	IKS	SFK
1	IFK Göteborg	3	2	1	0	5	1	+4	7	Advance to Knockout stage		2–0	1–1	
2	Västerås SK	3	2	0	1	7	2	+5	6					4–0
3	IK Sirius	3	1	1	1	9	5	+4	4			0–3		
4	Sollentuna FK	3	0	0	3	1	14	−13	0		0–2		1–8	

Source: Swedish Football Association
Rules for classification: 1) Points; 2) Goal difference; 3) Goals scored; 4) Head-to-head record; 5) Highest ranked team

22 February 2020 Matchday 1	IFK Göteborg	2–0	Västerås SK	Gothenburg
16:30 (UTC+1)	Kharaishvili 12'; Söder 25'	Report		Stadium: Valhalla 1 Konstgräs; Attendance: TBA; Referee: Kristoffer Karlsson

22 February 2020 Matchday 1	Sollentuna FK	1–8	IK Sirius	Stockholm
16:30 (UTC+1)	Ali 9'	Report	Björnström 5'; Lindberg 18', 24', 33', 74'; Andersson 31'; Holmquist Vecchia 44', 56'	Stadium: Grimsta IP; Attendance: 349; Referee: Fredrik Hansson

29 February 2020 Matchday 2	Sollentuna FK	0–2	IFK Göteborg	Stockholm
12:30 (UTC+1)		Report	Kharaishvili 21'; Söder 68'	Stadium: Grimsta IP; Attendance: 927; Referee: Martin Strömbergsson

29 February 2020 Matchday 2	IK Sirius	0–3	Västerås SK	Täby
12:30 (UTC+1)		Report	Tronêt 4'; Awad 34', 51' (pen.)	Stadium: Vikingavallen/Täby IP 1 Attendance: 465; Referee: Glenn Nyberg

7 March 2020 Matchday 3	Västerås SK	4–0	Sollentuna FK	Västerås
12:30 (UTC+1)	Sabetkar 2'; Awad 6' (pen.); Karlberg 59', 62'	Report		Stadium: Solid Park Arena; Attendance: TBA; Referee: Farouk Nehdi

7 March 2020 Matchday 3	IFK Göteborg	1–1	IK Sirius	Gothenburg
12:30 (UTC+1)		Report		Stadium: Valhalla 1 Konstgräs; Attendance: TBA; Referee: Andreas Ekberg

=== Group 8 ===
Pos	Team	Pld	W	D	L	GF	GA	GD	Pts	Qualification	ELF	ÖRE	BRA	OSK
1	IF Elfsborg	3	2	0	1	5	2	+3	6	Advance to Knockout stage		1–0	3–0	
2	Örebro SK	3	1	1	1	7	5	+2	4				3–3	
3	IK Brage	3	1	1	1	6	7	−1	4					3–1
4	Oskarshamns AIK	3	1	0	2	4	8	−4	3		2–1	1–4		

Source: Swedish Football Association
Rules for classification: 1) Points; 2) Goal difference; 3) Goals scored; 4) Head-to-head record; 5) Highest ranked team

22 February 2020 Matchday 1	IF Elfsborg	3–0	IK Brage	Borås
14:30 (UTC+1)	Frick 28', 56'; Karlsson 55'	Report		Stadium: Rydahallen; Attendance: 764; Referee: Kaspar Sjöberg

22 February 2020 Matchday 1	Oskarshamns AIK	1–4	Örebro SK	Oskarshamn
14:30 (UTC+1)	Dudu 77'	Report	Gerzić 33'; Larsson 51' (pen.); Book 61': Björndahl 89' (pen.)	Stadium: Ernemar IP - Konstgräs; Attendance: 320; Referee: Joakim Östling

29 February 2020 Matchday 2	Oskarshamns AIK	2–1	IF Elfsborg	Oskarshamn
16:30 (UTC+1)	Podrimcaku 7'; Stejdahl 47'	Report	Alm 13'	Stadium: Ernemar IP - Konstgräs; Attendance: 98; Referee: Andreas Johansson

29 February 2020 Matchday 2	Örebro SK	3–3	IK Brage	Örebro
16:30 (UTC+1)	Amin 34'; Book 64', 82'	Report	Hellberg 15'; Kouakou 39'; Pllana 90+3'	Stadium: Behrn Arena; Attendance: 986; Referee: Victor Wolf

8 March 2020 Matchday 3	IK Brage	3–1	Oskarshamns AIK	Borlänge
16:30 (UTC+1)	Pllana 31'; Kouakou 70' (pen.); Antonsson 77'	Report	Eliassi 20'	Stadium: Domnarvsvallen; Attendance: 213; Referee: Enzo Vesprini

8 March 2020 Matchday 3	IF Elfsborg	1–0	Örebro SK	Borås
16:30 (UTC+1)	Ndione 88'	Report		Stadium: Borås Arena; Attendance: 775; Referee: Victor Wolf

== Knockout stage ==
=== Qualified teams ===
Pos	Grp	Team	Pld	W	D	L	GF	GA	GD	Pts	Qualification
1	2	Malmö FF	3	3	0	0	13	1	+12	9	Seeded in Quarter-final draw
2	3	Hammarby IF	3	3	0	0	11	1	+10	9	Seeded in Quarter-final draw
3	6	BK Häcken	3	3	0	0	9	0	+9	9	Seeded in Quarter-final draw
4	1	Mjällby AIF	3	3	0	0	10	2	+8	9	Seeded in Quarter-final draw
5	7	IFK Göteborg	3	2	1	0	5	1	+4	7	Unseeded in Quarter-final draw
6	4	AIK	3	2	1	0	6	3	+3	7	Unseeded in Quarter-final draw
7	8	IF Elfsborg	3	2	0	1	5	2	+3	6	Unseeded in Quarter-final draw
8	5	Falkenbergs FF	3	2	0	1	4	2	+2	6	Unseeded in Quarter-final draw

Updated to match(es) played on 9 March 2020. Source: Group results
Rules for classification: 1) Points; 2) Goal difference; 3) Goals scored; 4) Ranking in 2019 season

=== Bracket ===
Quarter-finals
25 June 2020 – Gothenburg
BK Häcken	1
IF Elfsborg	2
25 June 2020 – Stockholm
Hammarby IF	1
IFK Göteborg (a.e.t.)	3
25 June 2020 – Hällevik
Mjällby AIF	1
Falkenbergs FF	0
25 June 2020 – Malmö
Malmö FF	4
AIK	1

Semi-finals
9 July 2020 – Borås
IF Elfsborg	0
IFK Göteborg (a.e.t.)	1
9 July 2020 – Hällevik
Mjällby AIF	0 (2)
Malmö FF (p)	0 (4)

Final
30 July 2020 – Gothenburg
IFK Göteborg (a.e.t.)	2
Malmö FF	1

=== Quarter-finals ===
25 June 2020	BK Häcken	1–2	IF Elfsborg	Gothenburg
18:00	Bengtsson 58'	Report	Alm 50'; McVey 71'	Stadium: Bravida Arena; Attendance: 0 Referee: Glenn Nyberg

25 June 2020	Hammarby IF	1–3 (a.e.t.)	IFK Göteborg	Stockholm
18:00	Tanković 19'	Report	Aiesh 54', 104' (pen.); Abraham 108'	Stadium: Tele2 Arena; Attendance: 0 Referee: Kaspar Sjöberg

25 June 2020	Mjällby AIF	1–0	Falkenbergs FF	Hällevik
20:15	Silverholt 48'	Report		Stadium: Strandvallen; Attendance: 0 Referee: Bojan Pandžić

25 June 2020	Malmö FF	4–1	AIK	Malmö
20:15	Christiansen 39', 66', 88'; Rieks 74'	Report	Abraham 7'	Stadium: Stadion; Attendance: 0 Referee: Kristoffer Karlsson

=== Semi-finals ===
9 July 2020	IF Elfsborg	0–1 (a.e.t.)	IFK Göteborg	Borås
17:45		Report	Wernersson 98'	Stadium: Borås Arena; Attendance: 0 Referee: Mohammed Al-Hakim

9 July 2020	Mjällby AIF	0–0 (a.e.t.) (2–4 p)	Malmö FF	Hällevik
20:15		Report		Stadium: Strandvallen; Attendance: 0 Referee: Kristoffer Karlsson
	Penalties
	Batanero (penalty missed); Ogbu (penalty scored); Löfquist (penalty scored); Moro (penalty missed)		(penalty scored) Berget; (penalty scored) Ahmedhosžić; (penalty missed) Bachirou; (penalty scored) Molins; (penalty scored) Knudsen

=== Final ===
30 July 2020
17:45

IFK Göteborg	2–1 (a.e.t.)	Malmö FF
Karlsson Lagemyr 86'; Farnerud 94'	Report	Toivonen 40'

Gamla Ullevi, Gothenburg
Attendance: 0
Referee: Glenn Nyberg
