= 2020 Djurgårdens IF season =

Djurgårdens IF Fotboll
2020 season
- Chairman: Lars-Erik Sjöberg
- Manager: Kim Bergstrand; Thomas Lagerlöf
- Stadium: Tele2 Arena
- Allsvenskan: 4th
- 2019–20 Svenska Cupen: Group stage
- 2020–21 Svenska Cupen: Semi-final
- UEFA Champions League: First qualifying round
| Home colours | Away colours | Third colours |

The 2020 season was Djurgårdens IF's 120th in existence, their 65th season in Allsvenskan and their 20th consecutive season in the league. In addition to the, Allsvenskan, they will compete in the 2019–20 and 2020–21 editions of the Svenska Cupen and the Champions League where they entered at the first qualifying round.

Djurgården entered the league season as defending champions having won their 12th league title, and the first in 14 years, on the final day of the 2019 season.

== Squad ==
As of 13 July 2020

| Squad No. | Name | Nationality | Position(s) | Date of birth (age) | Previous club |
Goalkeepers
| 12 | Per Kristian Bråtveit | (Norway) | GK | 15 February 1996 (age 30) | (Norway) Haugesund |
| 30 | Tommi Vaiho | (Sweden) (Finland) | GK | 13 September 1988 (age 38) | (Sweden) GAIS |
| 35 | Erland Tangvik | (Norway) | GK | 9 July 1997 (age 29) | (Norway) Tiller IL |
Defenders
| 2 | Jesper Nyholm | (Sweden) | CB | 10 September 1993 (age 33) | (Sweden) AIK |
| 4 | Jacob Une Larsson | (Sweden) | CB | 8 April 1994 (age 32) | (Sweden) Brommapojkarna |
| 5 | Elliot Käck | (Sweden) | LB | 18 September 1989 (age 37) | (Norway) Start |
| 15 | Jonathan Augustinsson | (Sweden) | LB/CB | 30 March 1996 (age 30) | (Sweden) Brommapojkarna |
| 16 | Aslak Fonn Witry | (Norway) | RB | 10 February 1996 (age 30) | (Norway) Ranheim |
| 21 | Erik Berg | (Sweden) | CB | 30 December 1988 (age 37) | (Denmark) Copenhagen |
| 26 | Linus Tagesson | (Sweden) | RB | 31 December 2002 (age 23) | Youth System |
| 28 | Alexander Abrahamsson | (Sweden) | CB | 7 August 1999 (age 27) | Youth System |
| – | Melker Jonsson | (Sweden) | CB | 10 July 2002 (age 24) | Youth System |
Midfielders
| 6 | Jesper Karlström (captain) | (Sweden) | CM | 23 October 1993 (age 33) | (Sweden) Brommapojkarna |
| 8 | Kevin Walker | (Sweden) (Republic of Ireland) | CM | 21 July 1989 (age 37) | (Sweden) GIF Sundsvall |
| 9 | Haris Radetinac | (Bosnia and Herzegovina) | RW/RB | 28 October 1985 (age 41) | (Sweden) Mjällby |
| 10 | Astrit Ajdarević | (Albania) (Sweden) | CM | 17 April 1990 (age 36) | (Greece) AEK Athens |
| 11 | Jonathan Ring | (Sweden) | LW/RW | 5 December 1991 (age 34) | (Sweden) Kalmar FF |
| 14 | Edward Chilufya | (Zambia) | RW/LW/ST | 17 September 1999 (age 27) | (Zambia) Mpande Academy |
| 19 | Nicklas Bärkroth | (Sweden) | RW/LW | 19 January 1992 (age 34) | (Poland) Lech Poznań |
| 22 | Emmanuel Banda | (Zambia) | CM | 29 September 1997 (age 29) | (Belgium) Oostende |
| 23 | Fredrik Ulvestad | (Norway) | CM | 19 May 1992 (age 34) | (England) Burnley |
| 24 | Curtis Edwards | (England) | CM | 12 January 1994 (age 32) | (Sweden) Östersunds FK |
Forwards
| 17 | Kalle Holmberg | (Sweden) | ST | 3 March 1993 (age 33) | (Sweden) IFK Norrköping |
| 20 | Emir Kujović | (Sweden) (Montenegro) | ST | 22 June 1988 (age 38) | (Germany) Fortuna Düsseldorf |
| 29 | Oscar Pettersson | (Sweden) | ST | 1 February 2000 (age 26) | Youth System |

=== Out on loan ===
Note: Flags indicate national team as defined under FIFA eligibility rules; some limited exceptions apply. Players may hold more than one non-FIFA nationality.

| No. | Pos. | Nation | Player |
|---|---|---|---|
| — | DF | SWE | Johan Andersson (to GIF Sundsvall until 31 December 2020) |
| — | MF | SWE | Dženis Kozica (to Jönköpings Södra until 31 December 2020) |

| No. | Pos. | Nation | Player |
|---|---|---|---|
| — | FW | SWE | Adam Bergmark Wiberg (to Örgryte until 31 December 2020) |
| — | MF | SWE | Hampus Finndell (to Dalkurd FF until 31 December 2020) |

== Competitions ==
=== Allsvenskan ===
==== League table ====
| Pos | Team | Pld | W | D | L | GF | GA | GD | Pts | Qualification or relegation |
|---|---|---|---|---|---|---|---|---|---|---|
| 2 | IF Elfsborg | 30 | 12 | 15 | 3 | 49 | 38 | +11 | 51 | Qualification for the Europa Conference League second qualifying round |
| 3 | BK Häcken | 30 | 12 | 13 | 5 | 45 | 29 | +16 | 49 | Qualification for the Europa Conference League second qualifying round |
| 4 | Djurgårdens IF | 30 | 14 | 6 | 10 | 48 | 33 | +15 | 48 | |
| 5 | Mjällby AIF | 30 | 13 | 8 | 9 | 48 | 44 | +4 | 47 | |
| 6 | IFK Norrköping | 30 | 13 | 7 | 10 | 60 | 46 | +14 | 46 | |

Source: svenskfotboll.se (in Swedish)
Rules for classification: 1) Points; 2) Goal difference; 3) Goals scored; 4) Head-to-head points; 5) Head-to-head goal difference; 6) Head-to-head away goals scored; 7) Play-off
(Note: Play-off is only played if need to decide champion, teams for relegation or UEFA competition and will be played on a neutral ground).

==== Results summary ====
| Overall | | | | | | | | Home | | | | | | Away | | | | | |
| Pld | W | D | L | GF | GA | GD | Pts | W | D | L | GF | GA | GD | W | D | L | GF | GA | GD |
|---|---|---|---|---|---|---|---|---|---|---|---|---|---|---|---|---|---|---|---|
| 30 | 14 | 6 | 10 | 48 | 33 | +15 | 48 | 7 | 4 | 4 | 27 | 16 | +11 | 7 | 2 | 6 | 21 | 17 | +4 |

Last updated: 6 December 2020.
Source: See Matches

==== Results by round ====
| Round | 1 | 2 | 3 | 4 | 5 | 6 | 7 | 8 | 9 | 10 | 11 | 12 | 13 | 14 | 15 | 16 | 17 | 18 | 19 | 20 | 21 | 22 | 23 | 24 | 25 | 26 | 27 | 28 | 29 | 30 |
|---|---|---|---|---|---|---|---|---|---|---|---|---|---|---|---|---|---|---|---|---|---|---|---|---|---|---|---|---|---|---|
| Ground | A | H | A | H | A | H | A | H | A | H | A | H | A | H | H | A | H | A | A | H | A | H | A | H | H | A | H | A | A | H |
| Result | W | L | L | W | L | D | W | W | L | D | W | W | W | L | W | W | D | L | W | D | D | L | D | W | W | L | L | W | L | W |
| Position | 3 | 8 | 13 | 4 | 11 | 10 | 5 | 3 | 5 | 5 | 5 | 5 | 5 | 5 | 5 | 5 | 5 | 5 | 5 | 5 | 4 | 4 | 4 | 4 | 4 | 4 | 4 | 4 | 4 | 4 |

Source: See Matches
A = Away; H = Home; W = Win; D = Draw; L = Loss

==== Matches ====
| 14 June 2020 1 | Sirius | 0–2 | Djurgården | Uppsala |
| 15:00 CEST (UTC+2) | Jarl (yellow card) 69' | Report | Berg 24'; Une Larsson (yellow card) 70'; Pettersson 87' | Stadium: Studenternas IP; Referee: (Sweden) Victor Wolf |

| 17 June 2020 2 | Djurgården | 1–2 | Örebro | Stockholm |
| 10:00 CEST (UTC+2) | Ulvestad (yellow card) 32'; Kujović 35' | Report | Besara 39' (yellow card) 81'; Mårtensson (yellow card) 59'; Book 89'; Björndahl (yellow card) 90+2' | Stadium: Tele2 Arena; Referee: (Sweden) Adam Ladebäck |

| 21 June 2020 3 | Norrköping | 3–0 | Djurgården | Norrköping |
| 17:30 CEST (UTC+2) | Nyman 20'; Lauritsen 38'; Levi 83' | Report | Berg 24'; Une Larsson (yellow card) 70'; Pettersson 87' | Stadium: Nya Parken; Referee: (Sweden) Bojan Pandžić |

| 28 June 2020 4 | Djurgården | 5–0 | Kalmar | Stockholm |
| 17:30 CEST (UTC+2) | Ulvestad 5' (pen.) 9' 39'; Augustinsson 10'; Walker 84' | Report | Aliti (yellow card) 4'; Romarinho (yellow card) 31' (yellow-red card) 87' | Stadium: Tele2 Arena; Referee: (Sweden) Adam Ladebäck |

| 1 July 2020 5 | Malmö | 1–0 | Djurgården | Malmö |
| 10:00 CEST (UTC+2) | Safari (yellow card) 39'; Christiansen 43' | Report | Berg (yellow card) 29'; Augustinsson (yellow card) 45'; Karlström (yellow card) 64' | Stadium: Eleda Stadion; Referee: (Sweden) Glenn Nyberg |

| 6 July 2020 6 | Djurgården | 2–2 | Helsingborg | Stockholm |
| 10:00 CEST (UTC+2) | Holmberg 9'; Karlström (yellow card) 14'; Ulvestad 23' (pen.); Berg (yellow card) 84' | Report | Svensson 31'; Diskerud (yellow card) 45+2'; Abubakari (yellow card) 55'; Gigović 65' | Stadium: Tele2 Arena; Referee: (Sweden) Bojan Pandžić |

| 12 July 2020 7 | Göteborg | 1–2 | Djurgården | Gothenburg |
| 08:30 CEST (UTC+2) | Tolinsson (red card) 25'; Kharaishvili (penalty missed) 37'; Holm (yellow card) 55'; Aiesh 62' (pen.) | Report | Ulvestad 9' (pen.); Holmberg 34'; Karlström (yellow card) 35' | Stadium: Gamla Ullevi; Referee: (Sweden) Kaspar Sjöberg |

| 15 July 2020 8 | Djurgården | 1–0 | Falkenberg | Stockholm |
| 10:00 CEST (UTC+2) | Une Larsson (yellow card) 59'; Käck (yellow card) 87'; Holmberg (yellow card) 90+1'; Witry 90+3' | Report | van Looy (yellow card) 32'; Englund (yellow card) 55' (yellow-red card) 83'; Karlsson (yellow card) 60' | Stadium: Tele2 Arena; Referee: (Sweden) Bojan Pandžić |

| 19 July 2020 9 | Elfsborg | 1–0 | Djurgården | Borås |
| 17:30 CEST (UTC+2) | Olsson (yellow card) 40'; Hümmet (yellow card) 55'; Holmén (yellow card) 77'; Une Larsson 88' (o.g.) | Report | | Stadium: Borås Arena; Referee: (Sweden) Glenn Nyberg |

| 22 July 2020 10 | Djurgården | 0–0 | Östersund | Stockholm |
| 19:00 CEST (UTC+2) | | Report | Haugan (yellow card) 63' | Stadium: Tele2 Arena; Referee: (Sweden) Victor Wolf |

| 26 July 2020 11 | AIK | 0–1 | Djurgården | Solna |
| 17:30 CEST (UTC+2) | Hussein (yellow card) 45+3'; Goitom (yellow card) 76' | Report | Witry 77'; Berg (yellow card) 83'; Ulvestad (yellow card) 90+5' | Stadium: Friends Arena; Referee: (Sweden) Glenn Nyberg |

| 1 August 2020 12 | Djurgården | 3–1 | Häcken | Stockholm |
| 15:00 CEST (UTC+2) | Ulvestad (yellow card) 8'; Holmberg 20' 45+3'; Berg 47' (yellow card) 58'; Karlström (yellow card) 79' | Report | Youssef (yellow card) 9'; Wålemark 32' | Stadium: Tele2 Arena; Referee: (Sweden) Bojan Pandžić |

| 5 August 2020 13 | Varberg | 1–2 | Djurgården | Varberg |
| 19:00 CEST (UTC+2) | Zackrisson (yellow card) 52'; Birkfeldt 54' | Report | Kujović 29'; Ulvestad 42' (pen.) | Stadium: Varberg Energi Arena; Referee: (Sweden) Mohammed Al-Hakim |

| 9 August 2020 14 | Djurgården | 1–2 | Hammarby | Stockholm |
| 17:30 CEST (UTC+2) | Karlström (yellow card) 68'; Fenger 74' (o.g.) | Report | Jóhannsson 4'; Imad Khalili 33'; Fällman (yellow card) 38'; Björklund (yellow card) 58'; Andersen (yellow card) 68'; Ludwigson (yellow card) 68'; Sher (yellow card) 90+1' | Stadium: Tele2 Arena; Referee: (Sweden) Andreas Ekberg |

| 12 August 2020 15 | Djurgården | 2–1 | Mjällby | Stockholm |
| 19:00 CEST (UTC+2) | Ulvestad (yellow card) 31'; Karlström (yellow card) 37'; Kujović 51'; Augustinsson 64'; Berg (yellow card) 78'; Une Larsson (yellow card) 89' | Report | Ogbu 29'; Löfquist (yellow card) 88' | Stadium: Tele2 Arena; Referee: (Sweden) Per Melin |

| 15 August 2020 16 | Örebro | 0–3 | Djurgården | Örebro |
| 15:00 CEST (UTC+2) | Mehmeti (yellow card) 60' | Report | Banda 45'; Käck (yellow card) 75'; Bärkroth 83'; Chilufya 90' | Stadium: Behrn Arena; Referee: (Sweden) Glenn Nyberg |

| 22 August 2020 17 | Djurgården | 2–2 | Göteborg | Stockholm |
| 15:00 CEST (UTC+2) | Une Larsson (yellow card) 41'; Berg 51' (yellow card) 73'; Edwards 59'; Witry (yellow card) 72' | Report | Sana 42' (pen.); Jallow (yellow card) 57'; Farnerud 87' | Stadium: Tele2 Arena; Referee: (Sweden) Kristoffer Karlsson |

| 30 August 2020 18 | Helsingborg | 3–1 | Djurgården | Helsingborg |
| 14:30 CEST (UTC+2) | Jönsson 60'; van den Hurk 71'; Abubakari (yellow card) 77'; Gero 81' | Report | Edwards 56'; Ulvestad (yellow card) 86' | Stadium: Olympia; Referee: (Sweden) Granite Maqedonci |

| 12 September 2020 19 | Djurgården | 1–1 | Elfsborg | Stockholm |
| 15:00 CEST (UTC+2) | Chilufya 47'; Radetinac (yellow card) 85' | Report | Karlsson 21'; Alm (yellow card) 53'; Holst (yellow card) 82'; Väisänen (yellow card) 90+5' | Stadium: Tele2 Arena; Referee: (Sweden) Kaspar Sjöberg |

| 20 September 2020 20 | Östersund | 1–1 | Djurgården | Östersund |
| 14:30 CEST (UTC+2) | Jno-Baptiste 90+1' | Report | Une Larsson (yellow card) 42'; Eriksson 61'; Walker (yellow card) 86'; Karlström (yellow card) 89' | Stadium: Jämtkraft Arena; Referee: (Sweden) Granite Maqedonci |

| 27 September 2020 21 | Djurgården | 1–2 | Norrköping | Stockholm |
| 17:30 CEST (UTC+2) | Kujović 78' | Report | Wahlqvist 5'; Nyman 57'; Jóhannesson (yellow card) 72'; Binaku (yellow card) 82'; Isak Pettersson (yellow card) 90+2' | Stadium: Tele2 Arena; Referee: (Sweden) Victor Wolf |

| 4 October 2020 22 | Hammarby | 1–1 | Djurgården | Stockholm |
| 14:30 CEST (UTC+2) | Tanković 24'; Jóhannsson (yellow card) 67'; Söderström (yellow card) 82'; Andersen (yellow card) 84' | Report | Radetinac (yellow card) 48'; Ulvestad (yellow card) 53'; Nyholm 90+4' | Stadium: Tele2 Arena; Referee: (Sweden) Kristoffer Karlsson |

| 19 October 2020 23 | Djurgården | 3–2 | Malmö | Stockholm |
| 19:00 CEST (UTC+2) | Bärkroth (yellow card) 25'; Radetinac (yellow card) 32'; Eriksson (yellow card) 66'; Une Larsson (yellow card) 75'; Ulvestad 81'; Holmberg 82' 89' | Report | Toivonen 18' 62'; Berget (yellow card) 32'; Brorsson (yellow card) 68'; Christiansen (yellow card) 73'; Traustason (yellow card) 90+6' | Stadium: Tele2 Arena; Referee: (Sweden) Glenn Nyberg |

| 24 October 2020 24 | Djurgården | 4–0 | Sirius | Stockholm |
| 15:00 CEST (UTC+2) | Ulvestad (yellow card) 34' (goal) 77' 86'; Karlström (yellow card) 57'; Holmberg 66' 72' | Report | Larson (yellow card) 10'; Björnström (yellow card) 30'; Stefano Vecchia (yellow card) 32' (yellow-red card) 58' | Stadium: Tele2 Arena; Referee: (Sweden) Andreas Ekberg |

| 28 October 2020 25 | Häcken | 0–2 | Djurgården | Gothenburg |
| 19:00 CEST (UTC+2) | Berggren (yellow card) 69' | Report | Radetinac 8'; Käck (yellow card) 53'; Ulvestad 71' (pen.); Eriksson (yellow card) 76' | Stadium: Bravida Arena; Referee: (Sweden) Mohammed Al-Hakim |

| 1 November 2020 26 | Falkenberg | 3–2 | Djurgården | Falkenberg |
| 17:30 CEST (UTC+2) | Johansson 6'; Peter 49'; Ericsson (yellow card) 51'; Mathisen (yellow card) 69' (goal) 74'; Amiot (yellow card) 90' | Report | Kujović 16'; Eriksson (yellow card) 46'; Ulvestad 52' (pen.); Augustinsson (yellow card) 77' | Stadium: Falcon Alkoholfri Arena; Referee: (Sweden) Victor Wolf |

| 8 November 2020 27 | Djurgården | 0–1 | AIK | Stockholm |
| 14:30 CEST (UTC+2) | Ulvestad (yellow card) 55' | Report | Larsson (yellow card) 43'; Bahoui 74' | Stadium: Tele2 Arena; Referee: (Sweden) Kaspar Sjöberg |

| 22 November 2020 28 | Kalmar | 0–3 | Djurgården | Kalmar |
| 14:30 CEST (UTC+2) | Bergqvist (yellow card) 90+2' | Report | Edwards 11'; Holmberg 18'; Eriksson (penalty missed) 31' 31'; Kujović (yellow card) 90+2' | Stadium: Guldfågeln Arena; Referee: (Sweden) Mohammed Al-Hakim |

| 29 November 2020 29 | Mjällby | 2–1 | Djurgården | Hällevik |
| 17:30 CEST (UTC+2) | Šabović (yellow card) 9'; Bergström 15'; Löfquist (yellow card) 57'; Ogbu 64'; Spelmann (yellow card) 86' | Report | Une Larsson (yellow card) 18'; Augustinsson (yellow card) 27'; Berg (yellow card) 45+1'; Eriksson 54'; Karlström (yellow card) 63' | Stadium: Strandvallen; Referee: (Sweden) Kristoffer Karlsson |

| 6 December 2020 30 | Djurgården | 1–0 | Varberg | Stockholm |
| 14:30 CEST (UTC+2) | Karlström (yellow card) 28' (goal) 46'; Nyholm (red card) 61'; Käck (yellow card) 75'; Kujović (yellow card) 89' | Report | Tashreeq Matthews (red card) 28' | Stadium: Tele2 Arena; Referee: (Sweden) Victor Wolf |

=== 2019–20 Svenska Cupen ===
==== Group stage ====
| Pos | Team | Pld | W | D | L | GF | GA | GD | Pts | Qualification |
|---|---|---|---|---|---|---|---|---|---|---|
| 1 | Mjällby AIF | 3 | 3 | 0 | 0 | 10 | 2 | +8 | 9 | Advance to Knockout stage |
| 2 | Djurgårdens IF | 3 | 1 | 1 | 1 | 6 | 6 | 0 | 4 | |
| 3 | Dalkurd FF | 3 | 1 | 0 | 2 | 5 | 9 | −4 | 3 | |
| 4 | Sandvikens IF | 3 | 0 | 1 | 2 | 4 | 8 | −4 | 1 | |

Source: Swedish Football Association
Rules for classification: 1) Points; 2) Goal difference; 3) Goals scored; 4) Head-to-head record; 5) Highest ranked team

===== Matches =====
| 22 February 2020 Matchday 1 | Djurgården | 3–2 | Dalkurd FF | Stockholm |
| 12:30 (UTC+1) | Kujović 18', 23'; Holmberg 31' | Report | Cissoko 43'; Kabashi (yellow card) 59'; Berggren 78' | Stadium: Tele2 Arena; Attendance: 7,047; Referee: Martin Strömbergsson |

| 2 March 2020 Matchday 2 | Sandvikens IF | 2–2 | Djurgården | Sandviken |
| 19:00 (UTC+1) | Koidan 80'; Englund 87'; Engqvist (yellow card) 90+3' | Report | Karlström 7'; Ulvestad 18' | Stadium: Göransson Arena; Attendance: 4,223; Referee: Enzo Vesprini |

| 7 March 2020 Matchday 3 | Djurgården | 1–2 | Mjällby AIF | Stockholm |
| 14:30 (UTC+1) | Augustinsson 16' (yellow card) 41' | Report | Löfquist (yellow card) 15'; Moro 29'; Löfgren 70'; Eriksson (yellow card) 75' | Stadium: Tele2 Arena; Attendance: 7,075; Referee: Kaspar Sjöberg |

=== 2020–21 Svenska Cupen ===
==== Matches ====
| 19 November 2020 Second qualifying round | Sollentuna FK (3) | 0–4 | Djurgårdens IF (1) | Sollentuna |
| 18:30 | | Report | Käck 41'; Kujović 45+2' (pen.), 90+1'; Une Larsson 80' | Stadium: Sollentunavallen; Referee: Fredrik Hansson |

=== 2020–21 Champions League ===
| 19 August 2020 First Qualifying Round | (Hungary) Ferencváros | 2–0 | Djurgården | Budapest |
| 19:00 | Nguen 33' 62'; Blažič (yellow card) 46'; Kovačević (yellow card) 66' | Report | Holmberg (yellow card) 65'; Berg (yellow card) 71' | Stadium: Groupama Arena; Attendance: 0 Referee: (Switzerland) Fedayi San |

=== 2020–21 Europa League ===
| 17 September 2020 Second Qualifying Round | Djurgården | 2–1 | (Gibraltar) Europa | Stockholm |
| 19:00 | Edwards (yellow card) 2' (goal) 42'; Chilufya (yellow card) 52'; Ulvestad 69' (pen.) | Report | Walker (penalty missed) 40'; Quillo (yellow card) 55' (yellow-red card) 62'; Gallardo 57'; Olmo (yellow card) 82'; Poku (yellow card) 89' | Stadium: Tele2 Arena; Attendance: 0 Referee: (France) Stéphanie Frappart |

| 24 September 2020 Third Qualifying Round | Djurgården | 0–1 | (Romania) CFR Cluj | Stockholm |
| 19:00 | Eriksson (yellow card) 12'; Chilufya (yellow card) 44'; Ulvestad (yellow card) 90+5' | Report | Vinícius 55'; Bordeianu (yellow card) 80'; Rondón (yellow card) 90+3' | Stadium: Tele2 Arena; Attendance: 0 Referee: (Poland) Bartosz Frankowski |

== Statistics ==
=== Appearances ===
Last updated: 6 December 2020.

| No. | Pos. | Name | Allsvenskan | | Svenska Cupen | | European Competition | | Total | |
| No. | Pos. | Name | Apps | Goals | Apps | Goals | Apps | Goals | Apps | Goals |
Goalkeepers
| 12 | GK | (Norway) Per Kristian Bråtveit | 18 | 0 | 0 | 0 | 3 | 0 | 21 | 0 |
| 30 | GK | (Sweden) Tommi Vaiho | 12 | 0 | 4 | 0 | 0 | 0 | 16 | 0 |
Defenders
| 2 | DF | (Philippines) Jesper Nyholm | 6+5 | 1 | 0 | 0 | 1 | 0 | 7+5 | 1 |
| 3 | DF | (Sweden) Marcus Danielson | 0 | 0 | 1 | 0 | 0 | 0 | 1 | 0 |
| 4 | DF | (Sweden) Jacob Une Larsson | 27 | 0 | 4 | 1 | 3 | 0 | 34 | 1 |
| 5 | DF | (Sweden) Elliot Käck | 18+7 | 0 | 2+1 | 1 | 2 | 0 | 22+8 | 1 |
| 15 | DF | (Sweden) Jonathan Augustinsson | 26+1 | 2 | 4 | 1 | 2+1 | 0 | 32+2 | 3 |
| 16 | DF | (Norway) Aslak Fonn Witry | 25+1 | 2 | 3 | 0 | 3 | 0 | 31+1 | 2 |
| 21 | DF | (Sweden) Erik Berg | 16+5 | 3 | 0 | 0 | 1 | 0 | 17+5 | 3 |
| 26 | DF | (Sweden) Linus Tagesson | 0 | 0 | 1 | 0 | 0 | 0 | 1 | 0 |
| 27 | DF | (Sweden) Melker Jonsson | 0+2 | 0 | 0 | 0 | 0 | 0 | 0+2 | 0 |
Midfielders
| 6 | MF | (Sweden) Jesper Karlström | 28 | 1 | 3 | 1 | 3 | 0 | 34 | 2 |
| 7 | MF | (Sweden) Magnus Eriksson | 10+3 | 3 | 1 | 0 | 2 | 0 | 13+3 | 3 |
| 8 | MF | (Sweden) Kevin Walker | 5+10 | 1 | 1+1 | 0 | 0 | 0 | 6+11 | 1 |
| 9 | MF | (Bosnia and Herzegovina) Haris Radetinac | 24+3 | 1 | 3+1 | 0 | 2+1 | 0 | 29+5 | 1 |
| 10 | MF | (Albania) Astrit Ajdarević | 1+3 | 0 | 0+2 | 0 | 0 | 0 | 1+5 | 0 |
| 11 | MF | (Sweden) Jonathan Ring | 17+7 | 0 | 1 | 0 | 0+2 | 0 | 18+9 | 0 |
| 14 | MF | (Zambia) Edward Chilufya | 10+6 | 2 | 2 | 0 | 2+1 | 0 | 14+7 | 2 |
| 19 | MF | (Sweden) Nicklas Bärkroth | 8+7 | 1 | 2+1 | 0 | 0 | 0 | 10+8 | 1 |
| 22 | MF | (Zambia) Emmanuel Banda | 4+4 | 1 | 0+2 | 0 | 1 | 0 | 5+6 | 1 |
| 23 | MF | (Norway) Fredrik Ulvestad | 27 | 11 | 3 | 1 | 3 | 1 | 33 | 13 |
| 24 | MF | (England) Curtis Edwards | 18+7 | 3 | 1+3 | 0 | 3 | 1 | 22+10 | 4 |
| 25 | MF | (Sweden) Mattias Mitku | 0+3 | 0 | 0+1 | 0 | 0 | 0 | 0+4 | 0 |
Forwards
| 17 | FW | (Sweden) Kalle Holmberg | 21+9 | 9 | 4 | 1 | 1+1 | 0 | 26+10 | 10 |
| 20 | FW | (Sweden) Emir Kujović | 9+19 | 5 | 4 | 4 | 1+2 | 0 | 14+21 | 9 |
| 29 | FW | (Sweden) Oscar Pettersson | 0+6 | 1 | 0 | 0 | 0 | 0 | 0+6 | 1 |

=== Goalscorers ===
The list is sorted by shirt number when total goals are equal.

| Rnk | Pos | No. | Player | Allsvenskan | Svenska Cupen | European Competition | Total |
|---|---|---|---|---|---|---|---|
| 1 | MF | 23 | (Norway) Fredrik Ulvestad | 11 | 1 | 1 | 13 |
| 2 | FW | 17 | (Sweden) Kalle Holmberg | 9 | 1 | 0 | 10 |
| 3 | FW | 20 | (Sweden) Emir Kujović | 5 | 4 | 0 | 9 |
| 4 | MF | 24 | (England) Curtis Edwards | 3 | 0 | 1 | 4 |
| 5 | MF | 7 | (Sweden) Magnus Eriksson | 3 | 0 | 0 | 3 |
| 5 | DF | 15 | (Sweden) Jonathan Augustinsson | 2 | 1 | 0 | 3 |
| 5 | DF | 21 | (Sweden) Erik Berg | 3 | 0 | 0 | 3 |
| 8 | MF | 6 | (Sweden) Jesper Karlström | 1 | 1 | 0 | 2 |
| 8 | MF | 14 | (Zambia) Edward Chilufya | 2 | 0 | 0 | 2 |
| 8 | DF | 16 | (Norway) Aslak Fonn Witry | 2 | 0 | 0 | 2 |
| 11 | DF | 2 | (Philippines) Jesper Nyholm | 1 | 0 | 0 | 1 |
| 11 | DF | 4 | (Sweden) Jacob Une Larsson | 0 | 1 | 0 | 1 |
| 11 | DF | 5 | (Sweden) Elliot Käck | 0 | 1 | 0 | 1 |
| 11 | MF | 8 | (Sweden) Kevin Walker | 1 | 0 | 0 | 1 |
| 11 | MF | 9 | (Sweden) Haris Radetinac | 1 | 0 | 0 | 1 |
| 11 | MF | 19 | (Sweden) Nicklas Bärkroth | 1 | 0 | 0 | 1 |
| 11 | MF | 22 | (Zambia) Emmanuel Banda | 1 | 0 | 0 | 1 |
| 11 | FW | 29 | (Sweden) Oscar Pettersson | 1 | 0 | 0 | 1 |
| TOTALS | | | | 47 | 10 | 2 | 59 |

==== Hat-tricks ====
| Player | Against | Competition | Minutes | Score after goals | Result | Date |
|---|---|---|---|---|---|---|
| (Norway) Fredrik Ulvestad | (Sweden) Kalmar | Allsvenskan | 5', 9', 39' | 1–0, 2–0, 4–0 | 5–0 (H) | 28 June 2020 |

==== Own goals ====
| Player | Against | Competition | Minute | Score after own goal | Result | Date |
|---|---|---|---|---|---|---|
| (Sweden) Jacob Une Larsson | (Sweden) Elfsborg | Allsvenskan | 88' | 1–0 | 1–0 (A) | 19 July 2020 |

=== Clean sheets ===
The list is sorted by shirt number when total clean sheets are equal.

| Rnk | No. | Player | Allsvenskan | Svenska Cupen | European Competition | Total |
|---|---|---|---|---|---|---|
| 1 | 30 | (Sweden) Tommi Vaiho | 5 | 1 | 0 | 6 |
| 2 | 12 | (Norway) Per Kristian Bråtveit | 5 | 0 | 0 | 5 |
| TOTALS | | | 10 | 1 | 0 | 11 |
