= Leonard Pllana =

Kosovan association football player (born 1996)

Personal information
- Full name: Leonard Arben Pllana
- Date of birth: 26 August 1996 (age 30)
- Place of birth: Mitrovica, FR Yugoslavia
- Height: 1.85 m (6 ft 1 in)
- Position: Forward

Team information
- Current team: Hwaseong
- Number: 11

Youth career
- 2002–2014: Trepça

Senior career*
Years	Team	Apps	(Gls)
2014–2015	Grebbestad	24	(17)
2016–2018	Dalkurd	37	(5)
2017	→ Norrby (loan)	12	(3)
2018–2019	GAIS	37	(4)
2020–2021	Brage	56	(21)
2022–2024	Jeonnam Dragons	66	(14)
2024–2025	Gimpo	68	(14)
2026–	Hwaseong	19	(9)

International career^{‡}
2017	Kosovo U21	2	(0)
- * Club domestic league appearances and goals as of 5 August 2026 ‡ National team caps and goals as of 5 September 2017

Leonard Arben Pllana (born 26 August 1996) is a Kosovan professional footballer who plays as a forward for K League 2 club Hwaseong FC.

== Club career ==
=== Early career ===
Pllana at the age of six started playing football in Trepça. On 12 January 2014, he joined Division 2 side Grebbestad. Pllana in July 2015 was on trial at Helsingborg U21, where on 21 July, he played in a league match against Häcken U21 after being named in the starting line-up and scored his side's only goal during a 1–3 home defeat.

=== Dalkurd ===
On 10 September 2015, Pllana signed a three-year contract with Superettan club Dalkurd and this transfer would become legally effective in January 2016. On 18 April 2016, he made his debut against Sirius after coming on as a substitute at 65th minute in place of Ahmed Awad and scored his side's second goal during a 1–2 away win.

==== Loan at Norrby ====
On 15 July 2017, Pllana joined Superettan side Norrby, on a season-long loan. Seven days later, he made his debut in a 0–3 home defeat against Falkenberg after being named in the starting line-up. Fourteen days after debut, Pllana scored his first goal for Norrby in his third appearance for the club in a 3–2 home win over Helsingborg in Superettan.

=== GAIS ===
On 7 August 2018, Pllana signed a one-year contract with Superettan club GAIS. Five days later, he made his debut in a 1–1 away draw against his former club Norrby after being named in the starting line-up.

=== Brage ===
On 27 November 2019, Pllana signed a one-year contract with Superettan club Brage and this transfer would become legally effective in January 2020. On 22 February 2020, he made his debut with Brage in the 2019–20 Svenska Cupen group stage against Elfsborg after being named in the starting line-up. Seven days after debut, Pllana scored his first goal for Brage in his second appearance for the club in a 3–3 away draw over Örebro in the 2019–20 Svenska Cupen group stage.

=== Jeonnam Dragons ===
On 25 January 2022, Pllana signed a two-year contract with K League 2 club Jeonnam Dragons. Jeonnam Dragons reportedly paid a €400,000 transfer fee. On 19 February 2022, he made his debut in a 1–0 away defeat against Anyang after being named in the starting line-up.

== International career ==
On 21 March 2017, Pllana received a call-up from Kosovo U21 for a 2019 UEFA European Under-21 Championship qualification match against Republic of Ireland U21, and made his debut after being named in the starting line-up.

== Personal life ==
Pllana was born in Mitrovica, FR Yugoslavia from Kosovo Albanian parents. His younger brother Bujar Pllana is a footballer who plays as a centre-back.

== Career statistics ==
=== Club ===
As of 1 July 2022

Club	Season	League			Cup		Continental		Other		Total	
Club	Season	Division	Apps	Goals	Apps	Goals	Apps	Goals	Apps	Goals	Apps	Goals
Grebbestad	2014	Division 2	0	0	—				9 (Note: Appearance(s) with Grebbestad B.)	11	9	11
Grebbestad	2015	Division 2	24	17	—				3	2	27	19
Grebbestad	Total		24	17	—				12	13	36	30
Dalkurd	2016	Superettan	21	3	1	0	—				22	3
Dalkurd	2017	Superettan	11	2	4	1	—				15	3
Norrby (loan)	2017	Superettan	12	3	1	0	—				13	3
Dalkurd	2018	Allsvenskan	5	0	3	0	—				8	0
Dalkurd	Total		49	8	9	1	—				58	9
GAIS	2018	Superettan	11	1	0	0	—				11	1
GAIS	2019	Superettan	26	3	0	0	—				26	3
GAIS	Total		37	4	1	0	—				37	4
Brage	2020	Superettan	28	8	3	2	—				31	10
Brage	2021	Superettan	28	13	5	2	—				33	15
Brage	Total		56	21	8	4	—				64	25
Jeonnam Dragons	2022	K League 2	14	5	0	0	6	2	—		20	7
Jeonnam Dragons	Total		14	5	0	0	6	2	—		20	7
Career total			180	55	18	5	6	2	12	13	216	75
