= Jönköping Bandy IF =

- City: Jönköping, Sweden
- League: Division 1
- Division: Södra
- Founded: 14 August 1947; 77 years ago
- Home arena: Råslätts IP

Jönköping Bandy IF is a bandy club in Jönköping, Sweden. The club was founded as Norrby IK in 1947, and was then a club for association football. The club changed names to Järhaga SK in 1949 and started playing bandy in 1963. While the bandy team thrived, the football club struggled and was ultimately dissolved in the 1980s. In mid 2005, the club changed to the present name, to better highlight its hometown.

The club has played in second tier Allsvenskan league, of Swedish bandy, for many seasons.
