= Kim Hellberg =

Swedish football manager (born 1988)

- Hellberg with Middlesbrough in 2026

Personal information
- Full name: Kim Alexander Hellberg
- Date of birth: 1 February 1988 (age 38)
- Place of birth: Norrköping, Sweden
- Height: 5 ft 11 in (1.80 m)
- Position: Midfielder

Team information
- Current team: Middlesbrough (head coach)

Youth career
- Smedby AIS

Senior career*
Years	Team	Apps	(Gls)
2005–2008	Kuddby IF		
2008–2009	Ringarums IF		
2009–2012	Dagsbergs IF		
2012–2013	Kimstad GoIF	5	(0)
2014	Dagsbergs IF	2	(0)
2020	Dagsbergs IF	1	(0)

Managerial career
- 2011–2012: Kimstad GoIF
- 2013–2016: Kuddby IF
- 2016–2019: IF Sylvia
- 2021–2023: IFK Värnamo
- 2024–2025: Hammarby IF
- 2025–: Middlesbrough
- * Club domestic league appearances and goals

Kim Alexander Hellberg (born 1 February 1988) is a Swedish professional football manager and former player who is the current head coach of EFL Championship club Middlesbrough.

He played as a midfielder in Sweden's lower divisions and began coaching during his playing career. In 2018, he led IF Sylvia to promotion to the third-tier Ettan. He was appointed assistant manager of Allsvenskan club IFK Norrköping in 2020, and at the end of the following year was named in his first top-flight head coach job at IFK Värnamo. He led Hammarby IF to consecutive runners-up positions in 2024 and 2025.

== Playing career ==
Born and raised in Norrköping, Sweden, Hellberg began his footballing journey in the city's grassroots scene. He came through the youth ranks at Smedby AIS before playing as a midfielder in the lower tiers of Swedish football. During his senior career, he represented clubs including Kuddby IF, Ringarums IF and Dagsbergs IF. While playing, Hellberg started his coaching career with Kimstad GoIF in 2011 at age 23, winning Division 5 in his debut season. Hellberg's playing career remained at the amateur and semi-professional level, with Division 3 being the highest tier in which he appeared.

Hellberg has spoken candidly about his playing career and early decision to become a coach. Reflecting on his time as a lower-league player, he stated, "I tried to be a footballer when I was a kid, but I felt quite early that I’m not good enough." Hellberg decided to retire from playing at the age of 22 and focus on coaching instead, later remarking, "I'm very happy that I… put my boots on the shelf and start coaching… because that was a very good decision," whilst also crediting his father's long coaching career with inspiring his own path into management.

== Coaching career ==
=== Early career ===
In 2013, Hellberg was appointed as the head coach of Kuddby IF. In just three seasons, he led Kuddby from Division 5 to Division 3. Towards the beginning of his coaching career, Hellberg also worked as a physical education teacher and subsequently as a primary school teacher.

In 2017, Hellberg joined IF Sylvia in Division 2, Sweden's fourth tier. In 2018, his second season in charge of the club, he led the side to a promotion to Ettan.

On 4 January 2020, Hellberg joined Allsvenskan club IFK Norrköping as an assistant coach to Jens Gustafsson. He also joined his father Stefan Hellberg in the coaching staff. On 10 April 2021, Hellberg signed a new two-year contract with the club, continuing as an assistant to new head coach Rikard Norling.

=== IFK Värnamo ===
On 6 December 2021, Hellberg was appointed as the new head coach of IFK Värnamo, signing a two-year contract ahead of the first ever Allsvenskan season in the club's history. In 2022, Värnamo surprisingly finished 10th in the Allsvenskan table, avoiding relegation by 20 points.

Ahead of the 2023 season, Hellberg attracted interest from fellow Allsvenskan club IFK Göteborg, but he decided to turned down the move. Instead, he led Värnamo to a 5th place in Allsvenskan, after a strong second half of the campaign. At the end of the season, Hellberg was nominated for the Allsvenskan Manager of the Year award, but the prize ultimately went to Jimmy Thelin from IF Elfsborg. On 17 November 2023, it was announced that Hellberg would leave Värnamo at the end of the year at the expiration of his contract.

=== Hammarby IF ===
On 14 December 2023, Hellberg was announced as the new head coach of Hammarby IF in Allsvenskan, signing a three-year contract. In his first full season in charge, he led Hammarby to a second-place finish in the 2024 Allsvenskan, the club's highest league placing since 2019, and was recognised with the Allsvenskan Coach of the Month award for October 2024 after a strong run of results in which Hammarby secured key victories in the closing stages of the campaign. The club's improvements over the course of the campaign saw Hellberg shortlisted at the Allsvenskans Stora Pris for the coach of the year accolade.

Under Hellberg, Hammarby repeated as runners-up in the 2025 Allsvenskan, finishing second behind eventual champions Mjällby AIF and again securing qualification for the UEFA Conference League as one of Sweden's top league sides. Across his two seasons, the team maintained a high win percentage and strong goal differential, with an attacking output among the division's best. Hammarby participated in the 2025–26 UEFA Conference League qualifiers; they progressed through the early rounds before being eliminated by Norwegian club Rosenborg BK in the third qualifying round, losing 1–0 on aggregate.

In November 2025, Hellberg had talks with EFL Championship club Swansea City. Days later, he was interviewed for the vacancy at Middlesbrough in the same division, with his appointment being subject to receiving a work permit.

=== Middlesbrough ===
On 24 November 2025, Hellberg was appointed head coach of EFL Championship club Middlesbrough, becoming the club's second overseas-born head coach. He joined after Middlesbrough moved to secure his services ahead of Swansea City, who had been close to appointing him, with the club reportedly paying around £250,000 in compensation to release him from his contract at Hammarby. Hellberg made an immediate impact at Middlesbrough, winning his first four competitive matches as head coach. This run equalled the club record for the best start by a managerial appointment, a feat previously achieved only by Bryan Robson in 1994. He subsequently won the EFL Championship Manager of the Month accolade after a successful period in January 2026 as Middlesbrough gained fifteen points from six games to move level with league leaders Coventry City; this became the first instance that a club had two separate managers win the award in the same season as Hellberg's predecessor Rob Edwards won the award in August 2025.

Middlesbrough's form dipped in the second half of the season with a late run of 2 wins in 10 games, including a 7 game winless streak across March and April. This saw them slip out of the automatic promotion spots, having spent 35 matchdays inside there across the season. A 2–2 draw away to Wrexham on the final day of the season ensured a fifth-placed finish for Middlesbrough, missing out on automatic promotion and settling for the play-offs. During preparation for their play-off semi-final against Southampton, their opponents were accused of improperly recording Middlesbrough's training sessions, which was dubbed "Spygate" in English media. Despite being defeated 2–1 on aggregate across the two-legged semi-final, Middlesbrough were reinstated when Southampton were disqualified from the play-offs after being found guilty of espionage on three separate occasions. They were subsequently defeated 1–0 by Hull City in the play-off final, with Hellberg referring to this period as a "rollercoaster of emotions".

Having started the 2026–27 season in impressive form, Hellberg was named Championship Manager of the Month for October 2026 after thirteen points from five unbeaten matches.

== Managerial style ==
The impact he's had on me in a short space of time has been massive, both in my football and my day-to-day life. I feel like I've come on leaps and bounds, and I can't thank him enough.

— Middlesbrough player Tommy Conway on Hellberg's influence on his development, 9 February 2026.

Hellberg's teams are built around a possession-focused, high-intensity style of play. His sides typically prioritise control of the ball and proactive attacking patterns, aiming to dominate possession and create frequent scoring opportunities through quick movement and vertical progression. When out of possession, they employ aggressive pressing to win the ball back swiftly, reflecting a modern, front-foot approach to transitional phases.

Tactically, Hellberg has often deployed formations such as 4–2–3–1 and 4–3–3, with a flexible back four and an emphasis on fluid positioning across midfield and attack. His system is adaptable, with players encouraged to interchange roles and maintain intense involvement in both phases of play.

Hellberg has cited several high-profile coaches as influences on his philosophy, including Marcelo Bielsa, whose intense pressing and demanding work-rate have shaped Hellberg's expectations of his teams. He has also acknowledged inspiration from Roberto De Zerbi, Pep Guardiola and Jürgen Klopp, reflecting a blend of possession tenets with energetic transitional play.

Assessments of Hellberg's style have noted its dynamic and sometimes high-risk nature, with an emphasis on training intensity and creating game-like scenarios in practice to instil his tactical principles. Supporters and observers have described his approach as technically demanding and capable of unlocking player potential, with examples of individuals flourishing under his guidance.

Reception to Hellberg's methods has been broadly positive among players and fans. Middlesbrough squad members have expressed enthusiasm for his approach, highlighting a collaborative atmosphere and willingness to adapt the team's possession strengths. Critics, while acknowledging the effectiveness of his possession game, have occasionally pointed to challenges in breaking down well-organised defences or adapting to different competitive environments.

== Personal life ==
Hellberg grew up in a football-centric family; his father, Stefan, was a coach for over three decades. Hellberg has credited his early exposure to football and coaching with shaping his career path. He and his wife have two children together, a son and a daughter.

== Managerial statistics ==
As of match played 21 November 2026

Managerial record by team and tenure
Team	From	To	Record					Ref.
Team	From	To	P	W	D	L	Win %	Ref.
IF Sylvia	1 December 2016	31 December 2019	30	11	5	14	36.7	
IFK Värnamo	6 December 2021	17 November 2023	65	26	13	26	40.0	
Hammarby IF	14 December 2023	24 November 2025	73	40	15	18	54.8	
Middlesbrough	26 November 2025	Present	52	25	14	13	48.1	
Total			220	102	47	71	46.4	—

== Honours ==
=== As a player ===
Dagsbergs IF

- Division 5 Östergötland Östra: 2011

=== As a manager ===
Kimstad GoIF

- Division 5 Mellersta: 2011

Kuddby IF

- Division 4 Östergötland Östra: 2015
- Division 5 Östergötland Östra: 2014

IF Sylvia

- Division 2 Södra Svealand: 2018

Individual

- Allsvenskan Coach of the Month: October 2024
- EFL Championship Manager of the Month: January 2026, October 2026
