= Dagsbergs IF =

Swedish football club

- Full name: Dagsbergs; Idrottsförening
- Nickname(s): Dacka
- Founded: 1963
- Ground: Dagsbergsvallen, Ljunga
- Chairman: Joakim Appelqvist
- Manager: Niclas Jonsson; Daniel Thapper
- League: Division 3 Nordöstra Götaland
- 2019: Div 4 Östergötland Östra, 1st
Home colours	Away colours

Dagsbergs IF is a Swedish football club located in Ljunga. Founded in 1963 by Åke "Bajdoff" Johansson.

== Background ==
Dagsbergs IF currently plays in Division 3 Nordöstra Götaland which is the fifth tier of Swedish football. They play their home matches at the Dagsbergsvallen in Dagsberg.

Dagsbergs IF are affiliated to Östergötlands Fotbollförbund.

== Players ==
=== First-team squad ===
As of 5 January 2019

Note: Flags indicate national team as defined under FIFA eligibility rules; some limited exceptions apply. Players may hold more than one non-FIFA nationality.

No.	Pos.	Nation	Player
—	GK	(Sweden) SWE	Elis Tunesson
—	GK	(Sweden) SWE	Kim Pettersson
—	DF	(Sweden) SWE	Benny Bergström
—	DF	(Sweden) SWE	Niclas Fyrberg
—	DF	(Sweden) SWE	Kevin Bjerselius
—	DF	(Sweden) SWE	Oskar Svensson
—	DF	(Sweden) SWE	Erik Johansson
—	DF	(Sweden) SWE	Jens Johansson
—	DF	(Sweden) SWE	Martin Johansson
—	DF	(Sweden) SWE	Mikael Löfgren
—	DF	(Sweden) SWE	Johan Magnusson
—	DF	(Sweden) SWE	Joakim Petersson
—	DF	(Sweden) SWE	Jimmy Sjöblom
—	MF	(Sweden) SWE	Viktor Alnerheim
—	MF	(Sweden) SWE	Jacob Andersson

No.	Pos.	Nation	Player
—	MF	(Sweden) SWE	Oliwer Augustsson
—	MF	(Sweden) SWE	Erik Eliason
—	MF	(Sweden) SWE	Kim Eklund
—	MF	(Sweden) SWE	Calle Jonsson
—	MF	(Sweden) SWE	Jesper Jonsson
—	MF	(Sweden) SWE	Joacim Jonsson
—	MF	(Sweden) SWE	Johan Jonsson (captain)
—	MF	(Sweden) SWE	Johan Jonsson
—	MF	(Sweden) SWE	Martin Tyrén
—	MF	(Sweden) SWE	Robin Wiklund
—	MF	(Sweden) SWE	Adam Åström
—	FW	(Sweden) SWE	Viktor Jonsson
—	FW	(Sweden) SWE	Robin Svensson
—	FW	(Sweden) SWE	Erik Petersson
—	FW	(Sweden) SWE	Erik Uhrbom

=== Notable former players ===
- Anders Whass
- Kim Hellberg

== Records ==
- Most played games:

(Sweden) Jesper Jonsson, 218 games (2013–)

- Most goals:

(Sweden) Andreas Bengtsson, 181 goals (2011–2019)

== Management ==
=== Technical staff ===
As of 30 December 2019

Name	Role
(Sweden) Johan Ruya	Antrenör Muduru
(Sweden) Daniel Thapper	Head coach
(Sweden) Jesper Eriksson	Team manager
(Sweden) Andreas Bengtsson	Sports director
(Sweden) Niklas Bark Kristensson	Physiotherapist
(Sweden) Peter Bergfast	Physiotherapist
(Sweden) Niklas Klangeryd	Equipment manager

== Season to season ==
Season	Level	Division	Section	Position	Movements
1964	Tier 6	Division 6	Östergötland B	8th	
1965	Tier 6	Division 6	Östergötland A	6th	
1966	Tier 6	Division 6	Östergötland A	3rd	
1967	Tier 6	Division 6	Östergötland A	5th	
1968	Tier 6	Division 6	Östergötland A	1st	Promoted
1969	Tier 5	Division 5	Östergötland A	10th	
1970	Tier 5	Division 5	Östergötland A	8th	
1971	Tier 5	Division 5	Östergötland A	8th	
1972	Tier 5	Division 5	Östergötland A	9th	
1973	Tier 5	Division 5	Östergötland A	9th	
1974	Tier 5	Division 5	Östergötland A	7th	
1975	Tier 5	Division 5	Östergötland A	10th	
1976	Tier 5	Division 5	Östergötland A	8th	
1977	Tier 5	Division 5	Östergötland A	11th	Relegated
1978	Tier 6	Division 6	Östergötland B	4th	
1979	Tier 6	Division 6	Östergötland B	1st	Promoted
1980	Tier 5	Division 5	Östergötland B	11th	Relegated
1981	Tier 6	Division 6	Östergötland B	3rd	
1982	Tier 6	Division 6	Östergötland B	6th	
1983	Tier 6	Division 6	Östergötland B	8th	
1984	Tier 6	Division 6	Östergötland B	4th	
1985	Tier 6	Division 6	Östergötland A	4th	
1986	Tier 6	Division 6	Östergötland A	4th	
1987*	Tier 7	Division 6	Östergötland A	3rd	
1988	Tier 7	Division 6	Östergötland B	2nd	
1989	Tier 7	Division 6	Östergötland C	1st	Promoted
1990	Tier 6	Division 5	Östergötland A	5th	
1991	Tier 6	Division 5	Östergötland A	2nd	
1992	Tier 6	Division 5	Östergötland A	2nd	
1993	Tier 6	Division 5	Östergötland Östra	10th	
1994	Tier 6	Division 5	Östergötland Östra	6th	
1995	Tier 6	Division 5	Östergötland Östra	5th	
1996	Tier 6	Division 5	Östergötland Östra	2nd	Promoted
1997	Tier 5	Division 4	Östergötland Östra	5th	
1998	Tier 5	Division 4	Östergötland Östra	10th	
1999	Tier 5	Division 4	Östergötland Östra	6th	
2000	Tier 5	Division 4	Östergötland Östra	8th	
2001	Tier 5	Division 4	Östergötland Östra	6th	
2002	Tier 5	Division 4	Östergötland Östra	3rd	
2003	Tier 5	Division 4	Östergötland Östra	6th	
2004	Tier 5	Division 4	Östergötland Östra	3rd	
2005	Tier 5	Division 4	Östergötland Östra	12th	Relegated
2006*	Tier 7	Division 5	Östergötland Östra	1st	Promoted
2007	Tier 6	Division 4	Östergötland Östra	10th	
2008	Tier 6	Division 4	Östergötland Östra	10th	
2009	Tier 6	Division 4	Östergötland Östra	12th	Relegated
2010	Tier 7	Division 5	Östergötland Östra	2nd	
2011	Tier 7	Division 5	Östergötland Östra	1st	Promoted
2012	Tier 6	Division 4	Östergötland Östra	9th	
2013	Tier 6	Division 4	Östergötland Östra	5th	
2014	Tier 6	Division 4	Östergötland Östra	10th	
2015	Tier 6	Division 4	Östergötland Östra	11th	Relegated
2016	Tier 7	Division 5	Östergötland Östra	4th	
2017	Tier 7	Division 5	Östergötland Östra	1st	Promoted
2018	Tier 6	Division 4	Östergötland Östra	3rd	
2019	Tier 6	Division 4	Östergötland Östra	1st	Promoted
2020	Tier 5	Division 3	Nordöstra Götaland	TBD	

- League restructuring in 1987 and 2006 resulted in a new divisions being created and subsequent divisions dropping a level.
