= Christoffer Aspgren =

Swedish footballer

Personal information
- Full name: Christoffer Daniel Aspgren
- Date of birth: 20 September 1995 (age 31)
- Place of birth: Sweden
- Height: 1.77 m (5 ft 9 1/2 in)
- Position: Midfielder

Team information
- Current team: Gefle IF
- Number: 19

Youth career
- –2010: Marma Mehede IF
- 2011–2014: Gefle IF

Senior career*
Years	Team	Apps	(Gls)
2014–2015	Gefle IF	3	(0)
2015	→ Piteå IF (loan)	2	(0)
2016–2021	Sandvikens IF	126	(3)
2022–	Gefle IF	70	(0)
- * Club domestic league appearances and goals as of 15 November 2024

Christoffer Aspgren (born 20 September 1995) is a Swedish footballer who plays as a midfielder for Gefle IF.
