= Rasmus Lindgren (footballer, born 1994) =

Swedish footballer

Personal information
- Date of birth: 17 June 1994 (age 32)
- Place of birth: Sweden
- Height: 1.75 m (5 ft 9 in)
- Position: Midfielder

Youth career
- –2010: Avesta AIK

Senior career*
Years	Team	Apps	(Gls)
2011–2015	Helsingborgs IF	2	(0)
2014	→ Ängelholms FF (loan)	7	(0)
2014	→ HIF Akademi (loan)		
2015–2016	Avesta AIK		
2017	IK Brage	15	(1)

International career
2009–2010	Sweden U17	14	(1)
2011–2013	Sweden U19	4	(0)
- * Club domestic league appearances and goals as of 13 February 2018

Rasmus Lindgren (born 17 June 1994) is a Swedish footballer who plays as a midfielder.
