= Råslätts IP =

Sports ground in Råslätt, Jönköping, Sweden

Coordinates: 57.7447°N 14.1547°E

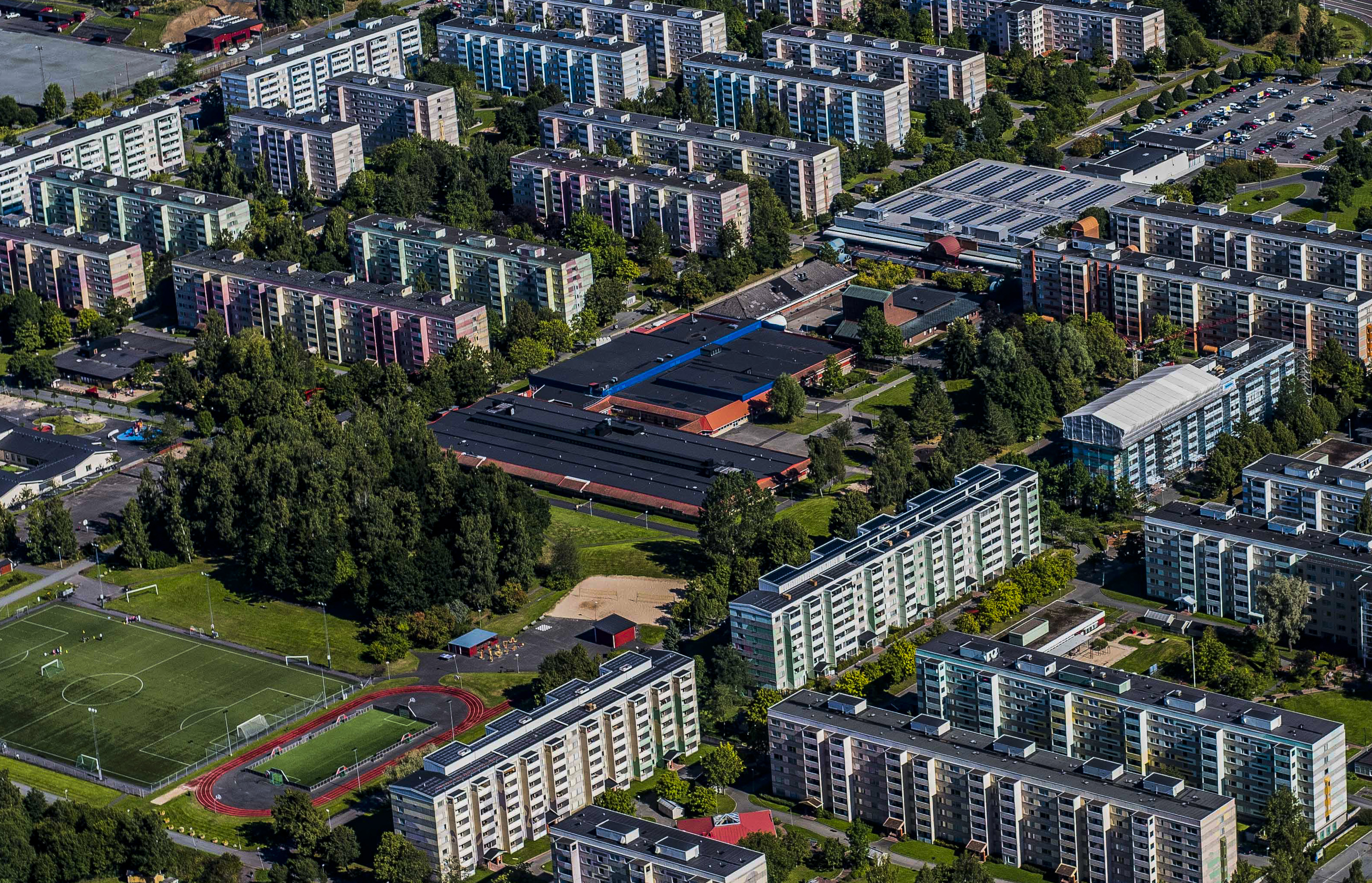
- September 2015 aerial photograph of Råslätt, with Råslätts IP seen to the bottom left.
- Interactive map of Råslätts IP
- Location: Jönköping, Sweden
- Owner: Jönköping Municipality
- Type: sports ground

Construction
- Groundbreaking: 1971

Tenants
- Jönköping Bandy IF; Råslätts SK

Råslätts IP is a sports ground in Råslätt in Jönköping, Sweden. Construction began in 1971.

It is mostly used for bandy, soccer and track and field athletics, and serves as home ground for Jönköping Bandy IF's bandy team and Råslätts SK's soccer team. The artificial ice rink was opened on 15 January 1988. There are plans to build a multi arena with an indoor bandy venue, originally thought to have been completed by 2009.

At Råslätts IP, international bandy games have been played between Sweden and Russia in 1993 (Swedish victory, 4-1) and 1997 (Swedish victory, 6-4). The seating capacity is 3 000 spectators.

On 19 January 2013, a practice game was played there where Månsarps IF defeated the Canadian national team 6-1., and on 21 January the same year another similar game was played where Jönköping Bandy IF won, 5-4, over the Team USA.
