= Jesper Tolinsson =

Swedish footballer (born 2003)

- Tolinsson with Sweden U21 in 2023

Personal information
- Full name: Jesper Mikael Tolinsson
- Date of birth: 28 February 2003 (age 23)
- Place of birth: Gothenburg, Sweden
- Height: 1.90 m (6 ft 3 in)
- Position: Centre-back

Team information
- Current team: Lommel
- Number: 14

Youth career
- –2014: Tuve IF
- 2015–2020: IFK Göteborg

Senior career*
| Years | Team | Apps | (Gls) |
| 2020–2021 | IFK Göteborg | 16 | (0) |
| 2021– | Lommel | 79 | (0) |
| 2023 | → IFK Norrköping (loan) | 10 | (0) |

International career^{‡}
| 2018–2020 | Sweden U17 | 16 | (0) |
| 2021–2024 | Sweden U21 | 14 | (0) |
- * Club domestic league appearances and goals as of 15:35, 20 April 2026 (UTC) ‡ National team caps and goals as of 20:26, 15 October 2024 (UTC)

Jesper Mikael Tolinsson (born 28 February 2003) is a Swedish professional footballer who plays for Belgian club Lommel as a centre-back.
