= Oscar Pettersson =

Swedish footballer

Personal information
- Full name: Oscar Hans Pettersson
- Date of birth: 1 February 2000 (age 26)
- Place of birth: Stockholm, Sweden
- Height: 1.78 m (5 ft 10 in)
- Position: Winger

Team information
- Current team: GAIS
- Number: 32

Youth career
- 2005–2016: Bromstens IK
- 2016–2018: Djurgårdens IF

Senior career*
| Years | Team | Apps | (Gls) |
| 2019–2020 | Djurgårdens IF | 6 | (1) |
| 2020 | → Akropolis IF (loan) | 13 | (4) |
| 2021 | Akropolis IF | 12 | (1) |
| 2022–2023 | IF Brommapojkarna | 60 | (24) |
| 2024 | IFK Göteborg | 23 | (2) |
| 2025–2026 | Go Ahead Eagles | 12 | (0) |
| 2026– | GAIS | 10 | (1) |

International career^{‡}
| 2016 | Sweden U17 | 3 | (0) |
| 2024 | Sweden | 1 | (0) |
- * Club domestic league appearances and goals as of 8 July 2026 ‡ National team caps and goals as of 23:40, 12 January 2024 (UTC)

Oscar Hans Pettersson (born 1 February 2000) is a Swedish professional footballer who plays as a winger for GAIS.

== Club career ==
Pettersson debuted for Djurgården on 23 February 2019, when he came on as a substitute in a Svenska cupen win against Hässleholms IF. Later the same year, he appeared in Allsvenskan on two occasions, making his debut in a 4–0 win against IK Sirius on 10 August 2019, for the team that was found champions in the end of the season. On 4 September 2020, Pettersson was loaned out to Superettan club Akropolis IF from Djurgården until the end of the season with the possibility to appear for both clubs.

After the 2020 season, Pettersson's contract with Djurgården ended, and Pettersson joined Akropolis permanently, signing a two-year contract in early 2021. In May 2021, Pettersson was diagnosed with myocarditis and forced to a football break. In late September 2021, he returned to the football field after four and half months, coming in as a substitute against Jönköpings Södra.

Before the 2022 season, he joined IF Brommapojkarna. With BP, he made 30 appearances for the 2022 Superettan league-winning team in his first season, scoring on 15 occasions.

On 3 December 2023, it was announced that Pettersson would join Allsvenskan side IFK Göteborg on a free transfer since 1 January 2024, signing a three-year contract with the club in the process.

On 4 February 2025, Pettersson was announced at Go Ahead Eagles on a three year contract until 2028, with the option of a further year.

On 20 March 2026, Pettersson moved back to Sweden to play for GAIS in the Swedish Allsvenskan signing af four-year contract.

== International career ==
Pettersson made his full international debut for the Sweden national team on 12 January 2024 in a friendly game against Estonia which Sweden won 2–1.

== Career statistics ==
=== Club ===
As of match played 17 December 2025

Appearances and goals by club, season and competition
| Club | Season | League | | | National cup | | Europe | | Other | | Total | |
| Club | Season | Division | Apps | Goals | Apps | Goals | Apps | Goals | Apps | Goals | Apps | Goals |
|---|---|---|---|---|---|---|---|---|---|---|---|---|
| Djurgårdens IF | 2019 | Allsvenskan | 2 | 0 | 1 | 1 | — | | — | | 3 | 1 |
| Djurgårdens IF | 2020 | Allsvenskan | 4 | 1 | 0 | 0 | — | | — | | 4 | 1 |
| Djurgårdens IF | Total | | 6 | 1 | 1 | 1 | — | | — | | 7 | 2 |
| Akropolis IF (loan) | 2020 | Superettan | 13 | 4 | 0 | 0 | — | | — | | 13 | 4 |
| Akropolis IF | 2021 | Superettan | 12 | 1 | 2 | 0 | — | | 2 (Note: Appearances in Superettan relegation play-offs) | 0 | 16 | 1 |
| IF Brommapojkarna | 2022 | Superettan | 30 | 15 | 2 | 0 | — | | — | | 32 | 15 |
| IF Brommapojkarna | 2023 | Allsvenskan | 30 | 9 | 3 | 1 | — | | — | | 33 | 10 |
| IF Brommapojkarna | Total | | 60 | 24 | 5 | 1 | — | | — | | 65 | 25 |
| IFK Göteborg | 2024 | Allsvenskan | 23 | 2 | 4 | 0 | — | | — | | 27 | 2 |
| Go Ahead Eagles | 2024–25 | Eredivisie | 7 | 0 | 1 | 0 | — | | — | | 8 | 0 |
| Go Ahead Eagles | 2025–26 | Eredivisie | 5 | 0 | 1 | 0 | 1 (Note: Appearances in UEFA Europa League) | 0 | 0 | 0 | 7 | 0 |
| Go Ahead Eagles | Total | | 12 | 0 | 2 | 0 | 1 | 0 | 0 | 0 | 15 | 0 |
| Career total | | | 126 | 32 | 14 | 2 | 1 | 0 | 2 | 0 | 143 | 34 |

=== International ===
As of match played 12 January 2024

Appearances and goals by national team and year
| National team | Year | Apps | Goals |
|---|---|---|---|
| Sweden | 2024 | 1 | 0 |
| Total | | 1 | 0 |

== Honours ==
Go Ahead Eagles

- KNVB Cup: 2024–25

Djurgården

- Allsvenskan: 2019

Brommapojkarna

- Superettan: 2022
