= Kalle Söderström =

Swedish association football player

Personal information
- Full name: Karl Göran Söderström
- Date of birth: 26 October 1985 (age 41)
- Height: 1.81 m (5 ft 11 in)
- Position: Midfielder

Team information
- Current team: Rolfstorp/Skällinge

Youth career
- Rydebäcks IF

Senior career*
Years	Team	Apps	(Gls)
2009–2011	Höganäs BK	55	(33)
2011–2017	Varbergs BoIS	156	(19)
2018–2021	Falkenbergs FF	98	(10)
2022	Varbergs GIF	14	(4)
2023–	Rolfstorp/Skällinge	10	(12)
- * Club domestic league appearances and goals as of 22:48, 20 April 2025 (UTC)

Karl Göran "Kalle" Söderström (born 26 October 1985) is a Swedish football player who plays for Rolfstorp/Skällinge.

== Career ==
Between 2009 and 2011, Söderström played for Höganäs BK. He scored 12 goals in 19 matches for the club in Division 3 2009. The 2010 season made Söderström 12 goals in 20 matches. In 2011, he scored nine goals in 14 matches.

In August 2011, Söderström was recruited by Varbergs BoIS. In November 2011, the contract was extended by two years. In November 2013, he again extended the contract by two years. In December 2015, Söderström extended the contract by one year. In January 2017, he extended his contract for another year.

Prior to the 2018 season, he signed a two-year contract with Falkenbergs FF. On 31 March 2019 Soderstrom made his Allsvenskan debut for Falkenbergs against Örebro SK. In December 2021 he was signed by Varbergs GIF.
