= Ahmed Awad (footballer) =

Palestinian footballer

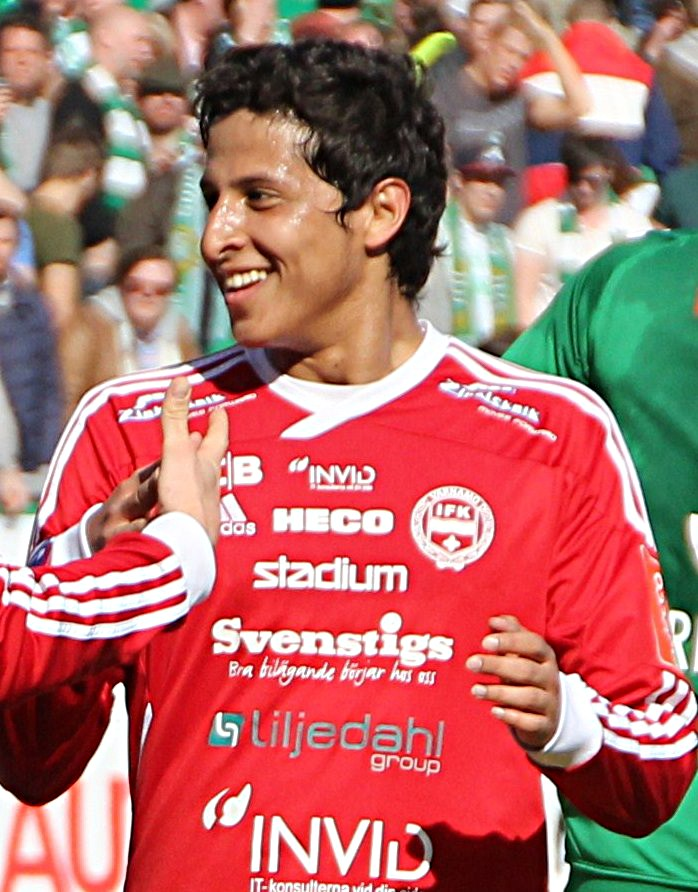
- Awad with IFK Värnamo in 2013

Personal information
- Full name: Ahmed Y. Awad Mohammad
- Date of birth: 1 June 1992 (age 34)
- Place of birth: Tiberias, Israel
- Height: 1.81 m (5 ft 11 in)
- Position: Midfielder

Team information
- Current team: AFC Malmö
- Number: 30

Youth career
- IK Brage

Senior career*
Years	Team	Apps	(Gls)
2011–2012	Dalkurd	39	(11)
2013	IFK Värnamo	22	(0)
2014–2019	Dalkurd	145	(43)
2020	Västerås SK	13	(1)
2020–2021	Östersunds FK	15	(1)
2022–2023	Dalkurd	15	(0)
2023–2024	Ariana	41	(17)
2025	Police Tero	12	(4)
2025–	AFC Malmö	34	(8)

International career^{‡}
2016–	Palestine	4	(1)
- * Club domestic league appearances and goals as of 16 November 2026 ‡ National team caps and goals as of 22 March 2018

Ahmed Y. Awad Mohammad (Arabic: أحمد عواد محمد; born 1 June 1992) is a Palestinian professional footballer who plays as a midfielder for AFC Malmö and the Palestine national team. Awad started playing football in the youth academy of IK Brage, before moving to Dalkurd. In 2013, he transferred to IFK Värnamo in Superettan, but returned to Dalkurd a year later.

== International career ==
Awad was raised in Sweden to parents of Palestinian descent, and is eligible for both Sweden and Palestine. In March 2016, Awad accepted a call-up to the Palestine national football team, and was on the bench in their 2–0 loss against the UAE in a FIFA World Cup qualifier on 24 March 2016.

== Career statistics ==
=== International ===
Scores and results list Palestine's goal tally first.

Goal	Date	Venue	Opponent	Score	Result	Competition
1	29 March 2016	Dora International Stadium, Hebron, Palestine	Timor-Leste	6–0	7–0	2018 FIFA World Cup qualification

== Honours ==
=== Individual ===
- Svenska Cupen Top goalscorer: 2019–20
