= Haris Radetinac =

Bosnian footballer (born 1985)

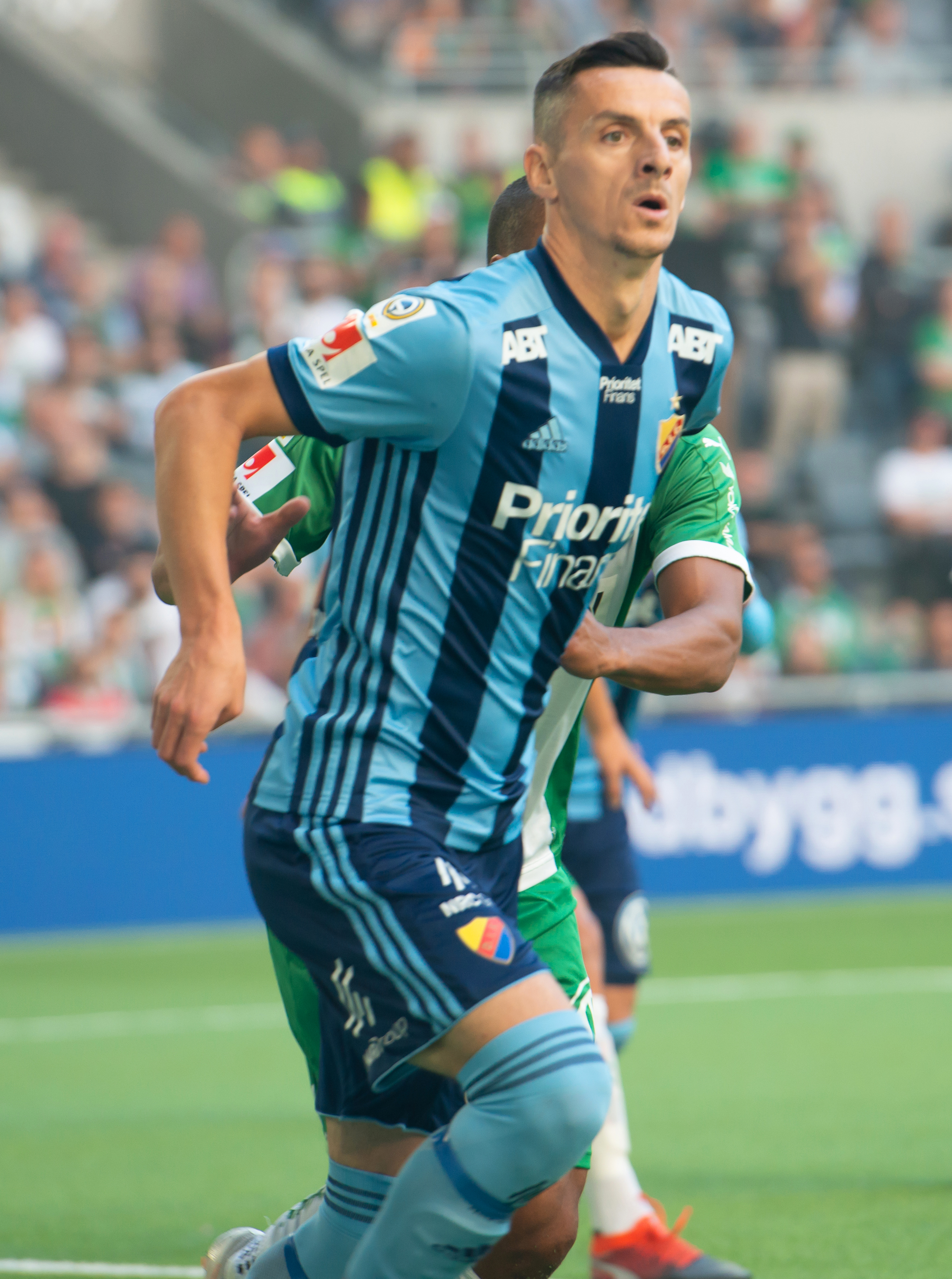
- Radetinac playing for Djurgårdens IF in 2018

Personal information
- Full name: Haris Radetinac
- Date of birth: 28 October 1985 (age 41)
- Place of birth: Novi Pazar, SFR Yugoslavia
- Height: 1.87 m (6 ft 2 in)
- Positions: Midfielder; winger

Team information
- Current team: Åtvidaberg
- Number: 9

Youth career
- –2003: Novi Pazar
- 2004: Linköpings FF

Senior career*
Years	Team	Apps	(Gls)
2005–2006	Linköpings FF	8	(12)
2007–2011	Åtvidaberg	145	(16)
2012–2013	Mjällby	47	(5)
2013–2024	Djurgården	241	(22)
2025-	Åtvidaberg	50	(17)
- * Club domestic league appearances and goals as of 16 November 2026

Haris Radetinac (born 28 October 1985) is a Serbian professional footballer who plays as a midfielder for Swedish third-tier club Åtvidaberg.

Ahead of the 2025 season Radetinac returned to Åtvidabergs FF accepting a role as a playing assistant manager.

== Career ==
Radetinac was born in Serbia but moved to Linköping, Sweden as an 18-year-old. There he joined local side Linköpings FF and eventually started playing with their first team in the fourth and fifth tier of Swedish football. In 2007, he was picked up by nearby Superettan team Åtvidabergs FF where he became an immediate starter and only missed five league games during his five years with the club. In 2009 Åtvidaberg was promoted to Allsvenskan for the first time since 1982, but was immediately relegated again the following year. Even though the club won promotion again in the 2011 Superettan he still made the move to another Allsvenskan side, Mjällby AIF, at the end of that year.

During the summer of 2013 he was offered a contract by Stockholm based club AIK but instead chose to sign a 3.5-year deal with their archrivals Djurgårdens IF. In the beginning he struggled for his new club, but after the new manager Per Olsson arrived Radetinac regained his form and was considered one of the best players in the league when he suffered an ACL injury which made him miss the second half of the 2015 Allsvenskan season. On 10 May 2018 he played as Djurgården beat Malmö FF 3–0 in the 2018 Svenska Cupen final. On 14 December 2024 he announced that it would be his last season, and after 303 competition games, the upcoming game against Legia Warzawa in UECL on 19 December will be his last.

== International career ==
The Bosnia and Herzegovina national football team showed interest in Radetinac while he was playing for Mjällby and he was included in a preliminary squad of theirs but never picked for the final squad of an international game.

== Personal ==
One of the career goals for Radetinac has been to play football in Italy, preferably for AS Roma.

== Honours ==
Djurgårdens IF

- Allsvenskan: 2019
- Svenska Cupen: 2017–18

Individual

- Årets Järnkamin: 2020
