= Nsima Peter =

Nigerian footballer (born 1988)

Personal information
- Date of birth: 28 December 1988 (age 37)
- Place of birth: Nigeria
- Height: 1.85 m (6 ft 1 in)
- Position: Forward

Team information
- Current team: Stafsinge IF

Senior career*
Years	Team	Apps	(Gls)
2011–2012	Kristianstad	43	(19)
2013–2016	Varberg	95	(27)
2017–2018	Frej	50	(18)
2019–2020	Falkenberg	44	(7)
2021	Akhisarspor	13	(2)
2021	Falkenberg	11	(2)
2022–2023	Utsikten	22	(4)
2023	Unirea Slobozia	0	(0)
2023	Nordic United FC	25	(6)
2024-	Stafsinge IF		
- * Club domestic league appearances and goals as of 29 December 2025

Nsima Peter (born 28 December 1988) is a Nigerian professional footballer who plays as a striker for Swedish club Stafsinge IF.

== Club career ==
Peter's mother club was Wikki Tourists FC. In 2011 he came to Sweden and Kristianstad. In the first match that he started he scored a hat-trick against Oddevold. On 29 September 2012, he again scored a hat-trick, this time against Karlstad in a match that ended with a 3-1 win for KFF.

In February 2013, he signed a three-year contract with Varberg. In December 2016, Peter was recruited by Frej, where he signed a one-year contract with an option for another year. On 18 November 2018, Peter was recruited by Falkenberg, where he signed a two-year contract. On 13 April 2019 he made his debut in the Allsvenskan for Falkenbergs against Häcken.

On 16 February 2022, Peter signed with Utsikten in Superettan.

In January 2023 Peter signed for Romanian club AFC Unirea Slobozia.

In March 2023 he returned to Sweden and signed for Nordic United FC.

In March 2024, he signed for the Swedish 3rd division club Stafsinge IF.
