= Robin Book =

Swedish footballer

Personal information
- Date of birth: 5 April 1992 (age 34)
- Height: 1.78 m (5 ft 10 in)
- Position: Midfielder

Team information
- Current team: Utsiktens BK
- Number: 11

Youth career
- Helsingborgs IF

Senior career*
Years	Team	Apps	(Gls)
2010–2011	Helsingborgs IF	0	(0)
2010–2011	→ Ramlösa Södra FF (loan)	31	(3)
2012–2015	Eskilsminne IF	84	(24)
2016	Syrianska FC	14	(3)
2016	GAIS	11	(2)
2017–2018	Utsiktens BK	49	(20)
2019	Varbergs BoIS	28	(6)
2020	Örebro SK	16	(2)
2020	→ Varbergs BoIS (loan)	11	(2)
2021–2024	Jönköpings Södra IF	70	(21)
2024–	Utsiktens BK	57	(11)
- * Club domestic league appearances and goals as of 16 November 2025

Robin Book (born 5 April 1992) is a Swedish professional footballer who plays as a midfielder for Utsiktens BK.
