= Ljunga =

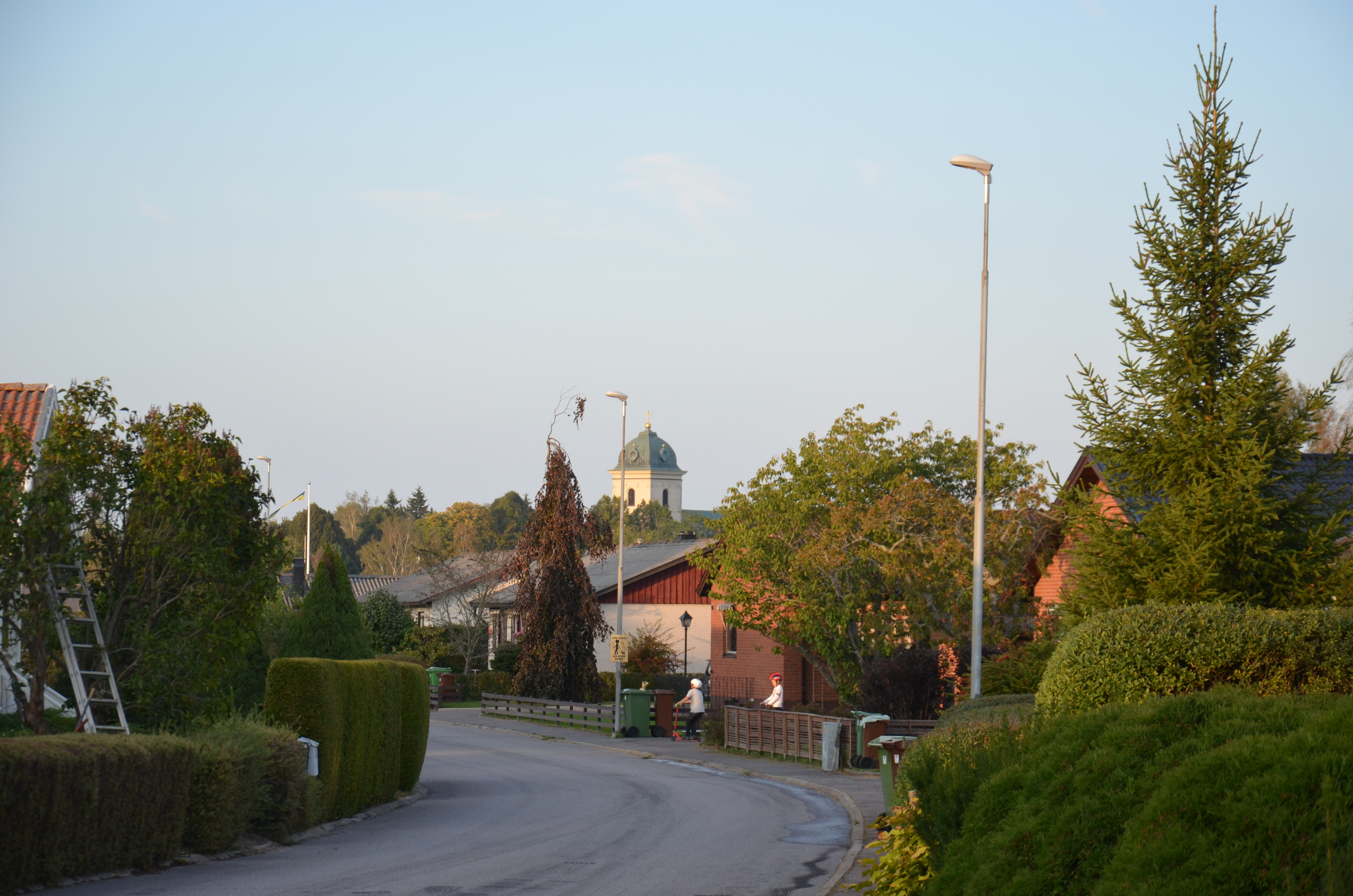
- Ljunga, east of Norrköping, Sweden. In the background Dagsberg church.

- Location within Östergötland Location within Sweden
- Coordinates: 58°31′N 16°21′E
- Country: Sweden
- Province: Östergötland
- County: Östergötland County
- Municipality: Norrköping Municipality

Area
  - Total: 0.68 km^{2} (0.26 sq mi)

Population (31 December 2010)
  - Total: 688
  - Density: 1,006/km^{2} (2,610/sq mi)
- Time zone: UTC+1 (CET)
  - Summer (DST): UTC+2 (CEST)

Ljunga is a locality situated in Norrköping Municipality, Östergötland County, Sweden with 688 inhabitants in 2010.
