= David Löfquist =

Swedish footballer (born 1986)

Personal information
- Full name: David Sebastian Magnus Löfquist
- Date of birth: 6 August 1986 (age 40)
- Place of birth: Sweden
- Height: 1.89 m (6 ft 2 in)
- Positions: Midfielder; forward

Team information
- Current team: Kristianstad FC
- Number: 12

Youth career
- Sölvesborgs GoIF

Senior career*
Years	Team	Apps	(Gls)
2006	Sölvesborgs GoIF		
2007–2011	Mjällby AIF	131	(21)
2012–2014	Parma	0	(0)
2012	→ Gubbio (loan)	9	(1)
2012	→ Malmö FF (loan)	4	(0)
2013	→ OB (loan)	13	(0)
2014–2015	Mjällby AIF	48	(5)
2016	Qingdao Red Lions	?	(9)
2017–2023	Mjällby AIF	184	(20)
2024–2026	Kristianstad FC	54	(11)
- * Club domestic league appearances and goals as of 7 August 2026

David Löfquist (born 6 August 1986) is a Swedish footballer who plays for Kristianstad FC. His nickname is "Löken" (English: "The Onion").

== Career ==
=== Mjällby AIF ===
Löfquist started his professional career at Mjällby AIF where he played for five seasons. The three first seasons was in Sweden's second highest tier of football, Superettan, while the last two seasons was in Sweden's highest league, Allsvenskan. Löfquist managed to play more than 130 league matches for Mjällby before he left the club in early 2012.

=== Parma ===
On 5 December 2011 it was announced that Löfquist had signed a two-and-a-half-year-long contract with Italian side Parma with an option to further extend the contract with two years in the summer of 2014.

==== Loan to Gubbio ====
Before Löfquist had played for Parma he was loaned out to Serie B side Gubbio on 31 January 2012 for the remainder of the 2011–12 season.

==== Loan to Malmö FF ====
On the last day of the transfer window, 31 August 2012, Löfquist signed a loan deal with Allsvenskan club Malmö FF for the rest of the 2012 season. Löfquist only appeared in four league matches for Malmö FF during the loan spell.

== Career statistics ==
As of 5 October 2012

Club performance			League		Cup		Continental		Total	
Season	Club	League	Apps	Goals	Apps	Goals	Apps	Goals	Apps	Goals
Sweden			League		Svenska Cupen		Europe		Total	
2007	Mjällby AIF	Superettan	19	1	—		—		19	1
2008	Mjällby AIF	Superettan	26	1	—		—		26	1
2009	Mjällby AIF	Superettan	30	5	—		—		30	5
2010	Mjällby AIF	Allsvenskan	29	6	4	0	—		33	6
2011	Mjällby AIF	Allsvenskan	27	8	1	0	—		28	8
Italy			League		Coppa Italia		Europe		Total	
2011–12	Gubbio	Serie B	9	1	0	0	—		9	1
Sweden			League		Svenska Cupen		Europe		Total	
2012	Malmö FF	Allsvenskan	4	0	0	0	—		4	0
Total	Sweden		135	21	5	0	0	0	140	21
Total	Italy		9	1	0	0	0	0	9	1
Career total			144	22	5	0	0	0	149	22

== Honours ==
=== Club ===
==== Mjällby AIF ====
- Superettan: 2009, 2019
