= Leo Englund =

Swedish footballer

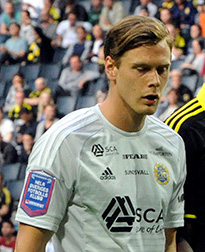

Personal information
- Full name: Nils Leo Englund
- Date of birth: 16 April 1991 (age 35)
- Place of birth: Sweden
- Height: 1.90 m (6 ft 3 in)
- Position: Forward

Team information
- Current team: Gefle IF
- Number: 11

Youth career
- IFK Bjurfors

Senior career*
Years	Team	Apps	(Gls)
2008–2009	Sunnanå SK	35	(31)
2010–2013	Skellefteå FF	74	(47)
2014–2015	GIF Sundsvall	35	(1)
2016	Umeå FC	26	(4)
2017–2018	Skellefteå FF	53	(44)
2019–2020	Sandvikens IF	56	(36)
2021–	Gefle IF	117	(50)
- * Club domestic league appearances and goals as of 8 May 2025

Leo Englund (born 16 April 1991) is a Swedish footballer who plays for Gefle IF as a forward.
