= Mamudo Moro =

Ghanaian footballer (born 1995)

Personal information
- Date of birth: 7 March 1995 (age 31)
- Place of birth: Accra, Ghana
- Height: 1.83 m (6 ft 0 in)
- Position: Midfielder

Team information
- Current team: BK Olympic
- Number: 16

Senior career*
Years	Team	Apps	(Gls)
2014	Sjöbo IF	12	(14)
2014–2015	BW 90 IF	22	(6)
2015	IFK Hässleholm	10	(5)
2016–2017	Mjällby AIF	41	(21)
2018–2019	Helsingborgs IF	50	(10)
2020–2024	Mjällby AIF	92	(13)
2024	Skövde AIK	17	(4)
2025	Al-Faisaly	1	(0)
2025	Ekenäs IF	7	(1)
2026–	BK Olympic	24	(6)
- * Club domestic league appearances and goals as of 16 November 2026

Mamudo Moro (born 7 March 1995) is a Ghanaian professional footballer who plays as a midfielder for Swedish club BK Olympic.

== Club career ==
On 29 February 2024, Moro signed a two-year contract with Skövde AIK.
