= 2019 Hammarby Fotboll season =

Swedish football team

Hammarby Fotboll
2019 season
- Chairman: Richard von Yxkull
- Head coach: Stefan Billborn
- Stadium: Tele2 Arena
- Allsvenskan: 3rd
- 2018–19 Svenska Cupen: Quarter-final
- Top goalscorer: League: Muamer Tanković (14); All: Muamer Tanković (15)
- Highest home attendance: 31 337 (7 April vs Kalmar FF, Allsvenskan)
- Lowest home attendance: 11 140 (18 February vs Varbergs BoIS, Svenska Cupen)
- Average home league attendance: 24 232

The 2019 season was Hammarby Fotboll's 104th in existence, their 50th season in Allsvenskan and their 5th consecutive season in the league. They competed in Allsvenskan and Svenska Cupen during the year. League play started in early April and lasted until November. Stefan Billborn made his second season as manager.

== Summary ==
Hammarby started the league play in a mediocre fashion, but made a strong finish to the season (with eight straight wins during between match day 22 and 30) and ultimately finished 3rd in Allsvenskan. This meant that the club qualified for the 2020–21 UEFA Europa League, their first continental competition in over ten years.

== Players ==
=== Squad information ===
N	Pos.	Nat.	Name	Age	Since	App	Goals	Ends	Transfer fee	Notes
1	GK	(Sweden)	Johan Wiland	38	2017	46	0	2019	Undisclosed	
2	DF	(Sweden)	Simon Sandberg	25	2018	51	0	2022	Free	
3	DF	(Sweden)	Dennis Widgren	25	2019	25	0	2022 (June)	Free	
4	DF	(Sweden)	Richard Magyar	28	2019	55	3	2022 (June)	Free	
5	DF	(Sweden)	David Fällman (vice captain)	29	2018	45	1	2020	Free	
6	MF	(Sweden)	Darijan Bojanić	25	2019	29	4	2022 (June)	Free	
7	MF	(Sweden)	Imad Khalili	32	2015	78	12	2020	Free	
8	MF	(Denmark)	Jeppe Andersen (captain)	27	2017	67	3	2023 (June)	Free	
11	MF	(Montenegro)	Vladimir Rodić	26	2018	35	9	2021	Undisclosed	
13	DF	(Denmark)	Mads Fenger	29	2017	52	3	2020 (June)	Free	
14	MF	(Sweden)	Tim Söderström	25	2019	18	0	2020	Free	
16	MF	(Sweden)	Leo Bengtsson	21	2016	34	0	2021	Youth system	
18	FW	(Sweden)	Filston Mawana	19	2019	0	0	2021	Undisclosed	
19	MF	(Gabon)	Serge-Junior Martinsson Ngouali	27	2017	55	3	2020 (June)	Undisclosed	
20	MF	(Sweden)	Alexander Kačaniklić	28	2019	25	10	2021	Free	
20	MF	(Ghana)	Abdul Halik Hudu	19	2018	0	0	2021 (June)	Undisclosed	On loan to IK Frej (Note: Hammarby IF have a cooperation with IK Frej and might temporarily loan out players during the season and recall them without further notice.)
21	DF	(Sweden)	Oscar Krusnell	20	2017	5	0	2020 (June)	Undisclosed	On loan to Team TG FF
22	FW	(Sweden)	Muamer Tanković	24	2017	70	22	2020 (June)	Undisclosed	
23	FW	(United States)	Aron Jóhannsson	29	2019	10	0	2022 (June)	Free	
23	DF	(Sweden)	Marcus Degerlund	21	2016	23	0	2021 (June)	Youth system	On loan to IK Frej
25	GK	(Sweden)	Davor Blažević	26	2018	18	0	2022	Free	
26	DF	(Sweden)	Kalle Björklund	20	2019	0	0	2020	Free	
28	DF	(Brazil)	Jean	24	2019	3	0	2021	Undisclosed	On loan to IK Frej
31	MF	(Sweden)	André Alsanati	19	2019	0	0	2020 (June)	Youth system	On loan to IK Frej
40	FW	(Serbia)	Nikola Đurđić	33	2018	54	26	2021	Free	
77	DF	(Norway)	Mats Solheim	32	2015	111	8	2019	Undisclosed	

- Last updated: 2 November 2019
- Source: Hammarby Fotboll and players' Wikipedia articles
- Ordered by squad number.

=== Transfers ===
==== In ====
No.	Pos.	Nat.	Name	Age	Moving from	Type	Transfer window	Ends	Transfer fee	Source
26	DF	(Sweden)	Kalle Björklund	19	Torre Levante (Spain)	Bosman	Winter	2020	Free	hammarbyfotboll.se
14	MF	(Sweden)	Tim Söderström	25	IF Brommapojkarna	Bosman	Winter	2020	Free	hammarbyfotboll.se
6	MF	(Sweden)	Darijan Bojanić	24	Helsingborgs IF	Bosman	Winter	2022 (June)	Free	hammarbyfotboll.se
3	DF	(Sweden)	Dennis Widgren	24	Östersunds FK	Bosman	Winter	2022 (June)	Free	hammarbyfotboll.se
4	DF	(Ivory Coast)	Odilon Kossounou	18	ASEC Mimosas (Ivory Coast)	Transfer	Winter	2022	Undisclosed	hammarbyfotboll.se
27	GK	(Italy)	Gianluca Curci	33	AFC Eskilstuna	Bosman	Winter	2019 (June)	Free	hammarbyfotboll.se
31	MF	(Sweden)	André Alsanati	19	Youth system	Promoted	Winter	2020 (June)	–	hammarbyfotboll.se
28	DF	(Brazil)	Jean	23	Tubarão (Brazil)	Transfer	Winter	2021	Undisclosed	hammarbyfotboll.se
20	MF	(Sweden)	Alexander Kačaniklić	27	FC Nantes (France)	Bosman	Winter	2021	Free	hammarbyfotboll.se
17	FW	(Iceland)	Viðar Örn Kjartansson	29	FC Rostov (Russia)	Loan	Winter	2019 (June)	Loan	hammarbyfotboll.se
18	FW	(Sweden)	Filston Mawana	18	TSG 1899 Hoffenheim (Germany)	Transfer	Winter	2021	Undisclosed	hammarbyfotboll.se
4	DF	(Sweden)	Richard Magyar	28	Greuther Fürth (Germany)	Transfer	Winter	2022 (June)	Free	hammarbyfotboll.se
23	FW	(United States)	Aron Jóhannsson	28	Werder Bremen (Germany)	Transfer	Winter	2022 (June)	Free	hammarbyfotboll.se

==== Out ====
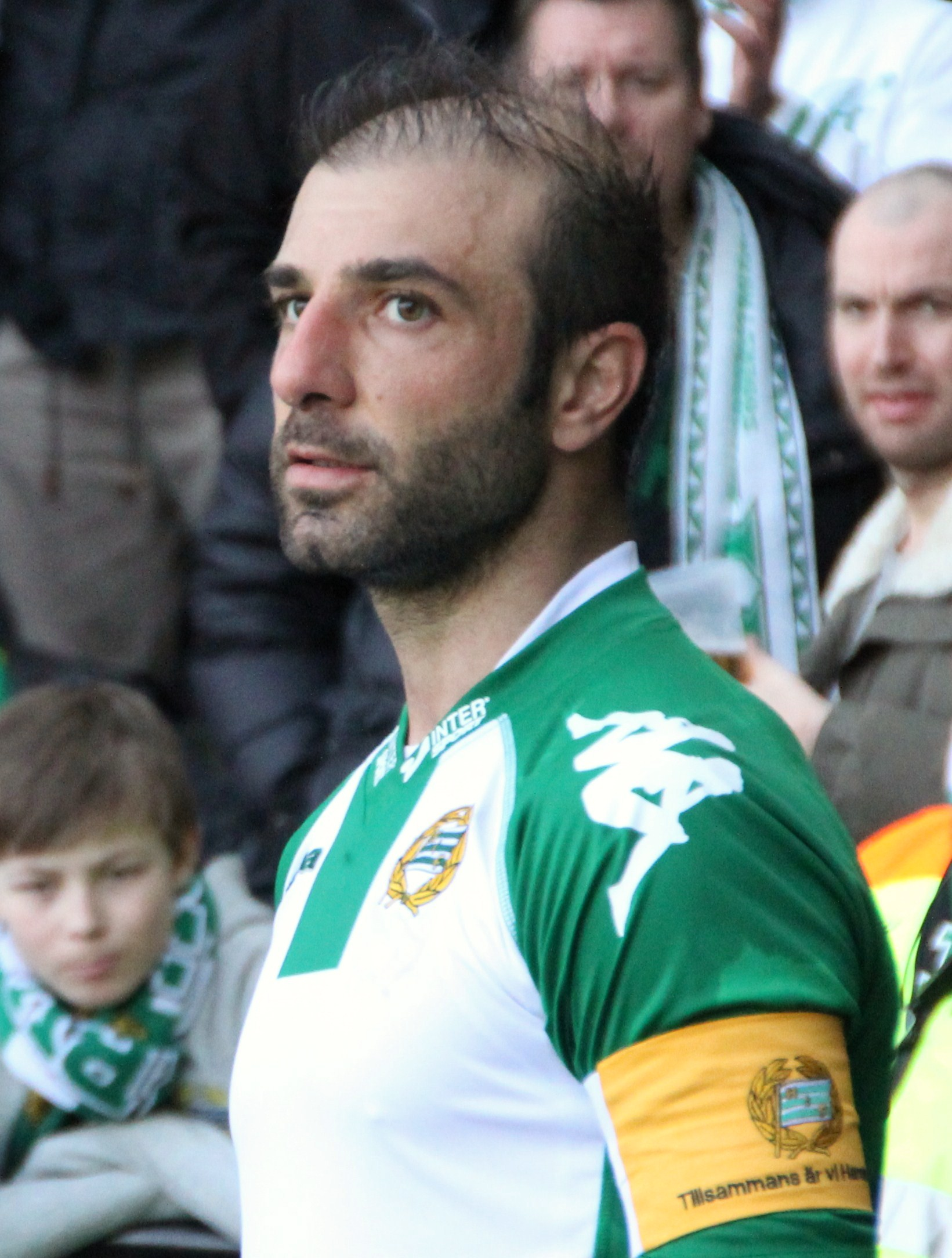
Kennedy Bakircioglu played 12 seasons at Hammarby.

No.	Pos.	Nat.	Name	Age	Moving to	Type	Transfer window	Transfer fee	Source
10	MF	(Sweden)	Kennedy Bakircioglu	38	Retired	End of contract	Winter	Free	hammarbyfotboll.se
27	GK	(Sweden)	Benny Lekström	37	Free agent	End of contract	Winter	Free	hammarbyfotboll.se
18	MF	(Sweden)	Rebin Asaad	24	Free agent	End of contract	Winter	Free	hammarbyfotboll.se
3	DF	(Brazil)	Neto Borges	22	(Belgium) Genk	Transfer	Winter	Undisclosed	hammarbyfotboll.se
4	DF	(Denmark)	Bjørn Paulsen	27	(Germany) FC Ingolstadt	Transfer	Winter	Undisclosed	hammarbyfotboll.se
6	MF	(Sweden)	Jiloan Hamad	28	(South Korea) Incheon United	End of contract	Winter	Free	hammarbyfotboll.se
14	MF	(Sweden)	Junes Barny	29	IFK Göteborg	End of contract	Winter	Free	ifkgoteborg.se
17	MF	(Sweden)	Dušan Jajić	20	IF Brommapojkarna	Transfer	Winter	Undisclosed	hammarbyfotboll.se
9	FW	(Norway)	Sander Svendsen	21	(Norway) Odds BK	Loan	Winter	Loan	hammarbyfotboll.se
4	DF	(Ivory Coast)	Odilon Kossounou	18	(Belgium) Club Brugge	Transfer	Summer	Undisclosed	hammarbyfotboll.se
9	FW	(Norway)	Sander Svendsen	21	(Denmark) Odense BK	Transfer	Summer	Undisclosed	hammarbyfotboll.se
17	FW	(Iceland)	Viðar Örn Kjartansson	29	(Russia) FC Rostov	End of loan	Summer	Free	expressen.se
27	GK	(Italy)	Gianluca Curci	34	Free agent	End of contract	Summer	Free	expressen.se

== Player statistics ==
=== Appearances and goals ===
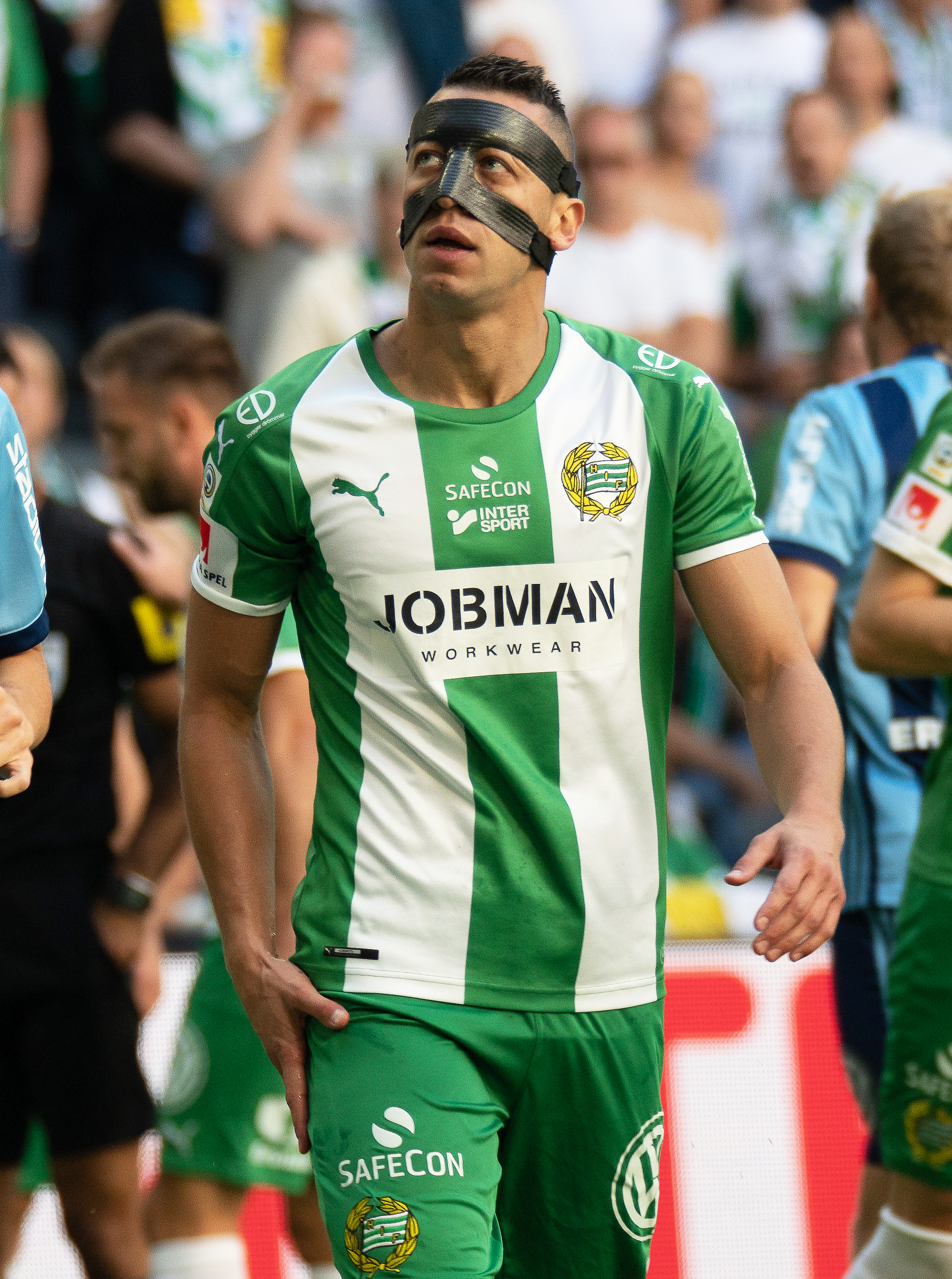
Nikola Đurđić was the league top scorer at Hammarby in 2018.

As of 2 November 2019

Number	Position	Name	2019 Allsvenskan		2018–19 Svenska Cupen 2019–20 Svenska Cupen		Total	
Number	Position	Name	Appearances	Goals	Appearances	Goals	Appearances	Goals
1	GK	Johan Wiland	7	0	0	0	7	0
2	DF	Simon Sandberg	28	0	4	0	32	0
3	DF	Dennis Widgren	25	0	2	0	27	0
4	DF	Richard Magyar	14	2	1	0	15	2
5	DF	David Fällman	18	1	3	0	21	1
6	MF	Darijan Bojanić	29	4	3	0	32	4
7	MF	Imad Khalili	23	8	4	1	27	9
8	MF	Jeppe Andersen	26	2	3	1	29	3
11	MF	Vladimir Rodić	21	6	3	0	24	6
13	DF	Mads Fenger	23	1	4	2	27	3
14	MF	Tim Söderström	18	0	4	0	22	0
16	MF	Leo Bengtsson	6	0	4	0	10	0
18	FW	Filston Mawana	0	0	1	0	0	0
19	MF	Serge-Junior Martinsson Ngouali	8	1	0	0	8	1
20	MF	Alexander Kačaniklić	25	10	4	1	29	11
22	FW	Muamer Tanković	28	14	5	1	33	15
23	FW	Aron Jóhannsson	10	0	0	0	10	0
25	GK	Davor Blažević	13	0	3	0	16	0
26	DF	Kalle Björklund	0	0	0	0	0	0
31	MF	Aimar Sher	1	0	1	0	2	0
40	FW	Nikola Đurđić	27	13	5	2	32	15
77	DF	Mats Solheim	26	3	3	1	29	4
Players that left the club during the season
4	DF	Odilon Kossounou	9	0	4	0	13	0
9	FW	Sander Svendsen	0	0	3	1	3	1
17	FW	Viðar Örn Kjartansson	15	7	0	0	15	7
20	MF	Abdul Halik Hudu	0	0	0	0	0	0
21	DF	Oscar Krusnell	0	0	0	0	0	0
23	DF	Marcus Degerlund	1	0	0	0	1	0
27	GK	Gianluca Curci	12	0	2	0	14	0
28	DF	Jean Carlos	3	0	2	0	5	0
31	MF	André Alsanati	0	0	0	0	0	0

=== Disciplinary record ===
N	P	Nat.	Name	Allsvenskan			Svenska Cupen			Total			Notes
N	P	Nat.	Name	Yellow card	Second yellow card	Red card	Yellow card	Second yellow card	Red card	Yellow card	Second yellow card	Red card	Notes
1	GK	(Sweden)	Johan Wiland										
2	DF	(Sweden)	Simon Sandberg	4		1				4		1	
3	DF	(Sweden)	Dennis Widgren	3			1			4			
4	DF	(Sweden)	Richard Magyar	1			1			2			
4	DF	(Ivory Coast)	Odilon Kossounou	3			1			4			
5	DF	(Sweden)	David Fällman	1						1			
6	MF	(Sweden)	Darijan Bojanić	4						4			
7	FW	(Sweden)	Imad Khalili	4						4			
8	MF	(Denmark)	Jeppe Andersen	6	1		1			7	1		
9	FW	(Norway)	Sander Svendsen										
11	MF	(Montenegro)	Vladimir Rodić	3						3			
13	DF	(Denmark)	Mads Fenger	3		1				3		1	
14	MF	(Sweden)	Tim Söderström										
16	MF	(Sweden)	Leo Bengtsson										
17	FW	(Iceland)	Viðar Örn Kjartansson	2						2			
18	FW	(Sweden)	Filston Mawana										
19	MF	(Gabon)	Serge-Junior Martinsson Ngouali										
20	MF	(Sweden)	Alexander Kačaniklić	3						3			
22	FW	(Sweden)	Muamer Tanković	3			1			4			
23	FW	(United States)	Aron Jóhannsson										
25	GK	(Sweden)	Davor Blažević	1						1			
26	DF	(Sweden)	Kalle Björklund										
27	GK	(Italy)	Gianluca Curci										
28	DF	(Brazil)	Jean Carlos	1						1			
40	FW	(Serbia)	Nikola Đurđić	4	2		1			5	2		
77	DF	(Norway)	Mats Solheim	2						2			

Last updated: 2 November 2019
Source: hammarbyfotboll.se
Only competitive matches
(yellow card) = Number of bookings; (second yellow card) = Number of sending offs after a second yellow card; (red card) = Number of sending offs by a direct red card.

== Club ==
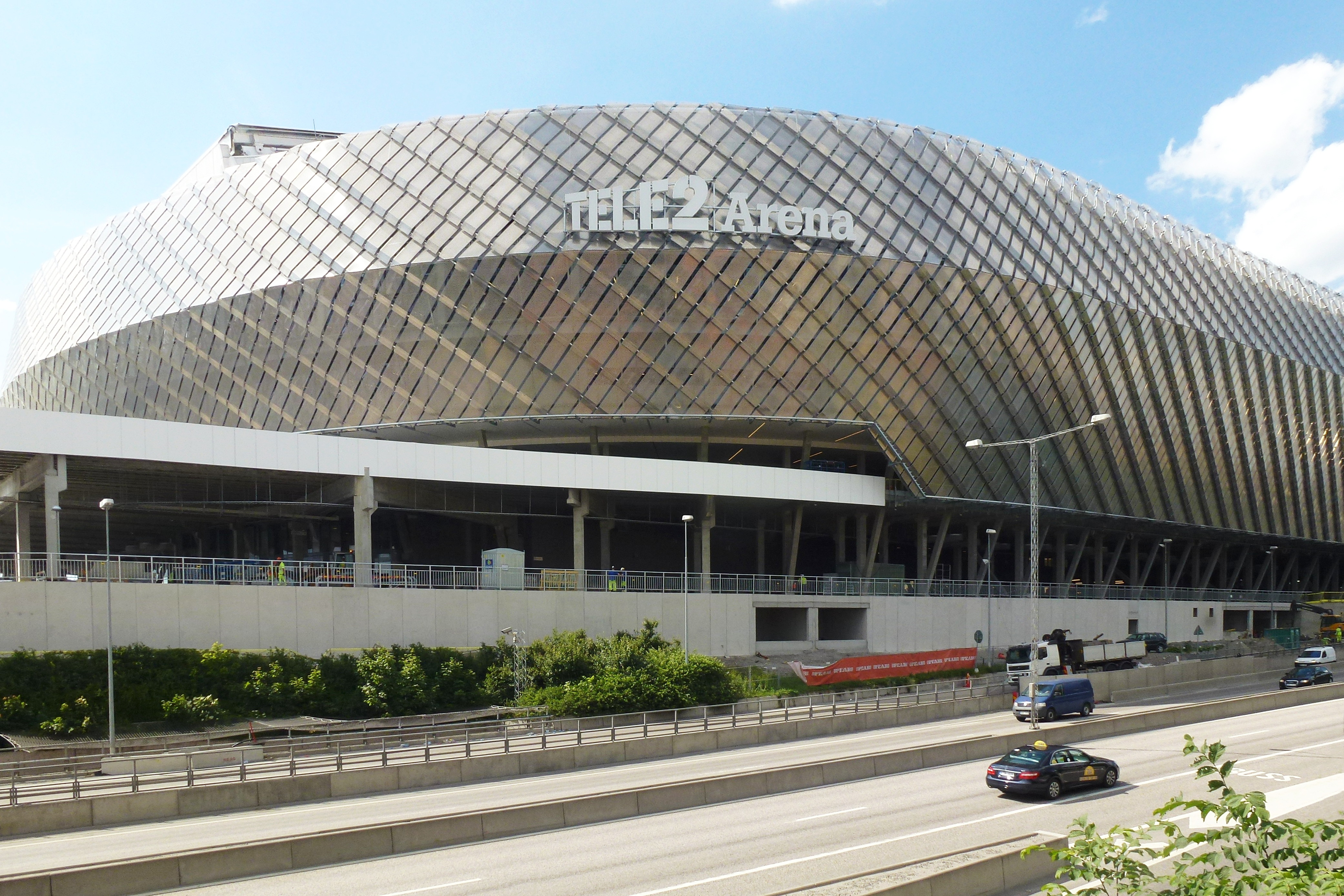
Tele2 Arena is the second largest stadium in Allsvenskan.

=== Coaching staff ===
Position	Staff
Manager	(Sweden) Stefan Billborn
Assistant manager	(Sweden) Joachim Björklund
Assistant manager	(Sweden) Pablo Piñones Arce
Fitness and individual coach	(Sweden) Janne Mian
Goalkeeping coach	(Sweden) Mikael "Mille" Olsson
Team manager	(Sweden) Mathias Eriksson
Assistant team manager	(Sweden) Wadda Tamimi
Data scientist	(England) David Sumpter
Club doctor	(Sweden) Mikael Klotz
Physiotherapist	(Sweden) Andreas Gavelius
Equipment manager	(Sweden) Anders Bitén
U19 head coach	(England) Martin Foyston
U19 assistant coach	(England) Jamie Steel
U17 head coach	(Sweden) Fredrik Samuelsson
U19 and U17 goalkeeping coach	(Sweden) Gustav Scheutz

=== Other information ===
Chairman	(Sweden) Richard von Yxkull
Managing director	(Sweden) Henrik Kindlund
Director of football	(Sweden) Jesper Jansson
Technical director	(Sweden) Ola Larsson
Head of scouting	(Sweden) Mikael Hjelmberg
Ground (capacity and dimensions)	Tele2 Arena (33,000 / )

== Pre-season and friendlies ==
=== Friendlies ===
19 January 2019 Friendly	IK Frej	1–3	Hammarby IF	Täby
13:00 CET (UTC+01)	Alsanati 67'	Report	Rodić 37'; Bojanić 39'; Degerlund 61'	Stadium: Vikingavallen; Attendance: 1,622; Referee: Granit Maqedonci (Sweden)

26 January 2019 Friendly	HJK Helsinki (Finland)	3–1	(Sweden) Hammarby IF	Helsinki, Finland
13:45 CET (UTC+01)	Pelvas 54'; Tarasov 59', 86'	Report	Rodić 51'	Stadium: Talin jalkapallohalli Attendance: 600

4 February 2019 Friendly	Hammarby IF (Sweden)	1–0	(Austria) St. Pölten	Belek, Turkey
15:00 CET (UTC+01)	Söderström (yellow card) 64'; Rodić 86'; Blažević (yellow card) 90+2'	Report

8 February 2019 Friendly	Hammarby IF (Sweden)	3–1	(Japan) Shonan Bellmare	Belek, Turkey
12:00 CET (UTC+01)	Tanković 18' (pen.); Đurđić 48' (pen.); Andersen (yellow card) 79'; Leo Bengtsson 86'	Report	Suzuki 90+4'

18 March 2019 Friendly	Hammarby IF	2–2	FC Linköping City	Stockholm
14:15 CET (UTC+01)	Svendsen 69'; Khalili 90'	Report	Sabah 16'; Alm 33'	Stadium: Hammarby IP; Referee: Mohammed Al-Hakim (Sweden)

24 March 2019 Friendly	Mjällby AIF	0–1	Hammarby IF	Hällevik
15:00 CET (UTC+01)		Report	Đurđić 34'	Stadium: Strandvallen; Referee: Andreas Ekberg (Sweden)

19 June 2019 Friendly	Kalmar FF	1–0	Hammarby IF	Kosta
18:00 CET (UTC+01)	Ahl Holmström 75'	Report		Stadium: Ekevallen

== Competitions ==
=== Allsvenskan ===
==== League table ====
Pos	Team	Pld	W	D	L	GF	GA	GD	Pts	Qualification or relegation
1	Djurgårdens IF (C)	30	20	6	4	53	19	+34	66	Qualification for the Champions League first qualifying round
2	Malmö FF	30	19	8	3	56	16	+40	65	Qualification for the Europa League first qualifying round
3	Hammarby IF	30	20	5	5	75	38	+37	65	Qualification for the Europa League first qualifying round
4	AIK	30	19	5	6	47	24	+23	62	
5	IFK Norrköping	30	16	9	5	54	26	+28	57	

Source: svenskfotboll.se (in Swedish)
Rules for classification: 1) Points; 2) Goal difference; 3) Goals scored; 4) Head-to-head points; 5) Head-to-head goal difference; 6) Head-to-head away goals scored; 7) Play-off
(Note: Play-off is only played if need to decide champion, teams for relegation or UEFA competition and will be played on a neutral ground).
(C) Champions

==== Results summary ====
Overall								Home						Away					
Pld	W	D	L	GF	GA	GD	Pts	W	D	L	GF	GA	GD	W	D	L	GF	GA	GD
30	20	5	5	75	38	+37	65	13	2	0	49	15	+34	7	3	5	26	23	+3

Source: svenskfotboll.se (in Swedish)

==== Results by round ====
Round	1	2	3	4	5	6	7	8	9	10	11	12	13	14	15	16	17	18	19	20	21	22	23	24	25	26	27	28	29	30
Ground	A	H	A	H	A	H	A	H	H	A	H	A	A	H	A	H	A	A	H	H	A	A	H	H	A	H	A	H	A	H
Result	D	D	L	W	L	W	W	W	W	D	D	L	L	W	W	W	W	D	W	W	W	L	W	W	W	W	W	W	W	W
Position	8	10	13	7	13	8	7	4	4	6	6	6	6	6	6	6	4	5	4	4	3	5	4	4	4	3	3	2	3	3

Source: see below
A = Away; H = Home; W = Win; D = Draw; L = Loss

==== Matches ====
Kickoff times are in (UTC+01) unless stated otherwise.

===== April =====
1 April 2019 Round 1	IF Elfsborg	1–1	Hammarby IF	Borås
19:00	Holst 43'; Levi (yellow card) 82'	Report	Tanković 18'; Kossounou (yellow card) 28'; Fenger (yellow card) 51'	Stadium: Borås Arena; Attendance: 8 737; Referee: Andreas Ekberg (Sweden)

7 April 2019 Round 2	Hammarby IF	1–1	Kalmar FF	Stockholm
17:30	Đurđić 68', (yellow card) 90'; Sandberg (yellow card) 90'; Rodić (yellow card) 90'	Report	Fröling 18'; Johansson (yellow card) 70'; Aliti (yellow card) 90'; Eid (yellow card) 90'	Stadium: Tele2 Arena; Attendance: 31 337; Referee: Mohammed Al-Hakim (Sweden)

15 April 2019 Round 3	Helsingborgs IF	2–1	Hammarby IF	Helsingborg
19:00	Abubakari 15'; Wanderson (yellow card) 18'; Farnerud (yellow card) 68'; Boysen (yellow card) 90'; Curci 82' (o.g.)	Report	Kjartansson 20', (yellow card) 68'; Solheim (yellow card) 33'	Stadium: Olympia; Attendance: 10 156; Referee: Bojan Pandžić (Sweden)

21 April 2019 Round 4	Hammarby IF	3–1	AFC Eskilstuna	Stockholm
17:30	Khalili 19', 64'; Kjartansson 32'	Report	Nnamani (yellow card) 25'; Bobko 83'	Stadium: Tele2 Arena; Attendance: 19 445; Referee: Martin Strömbergsson (Sweden)

24 April 2019 Round 5	Malmö FF	4–1	Hammarby IF	Malmö
19:00	Traustason 53'; Christiansen (yellow card) 56'; Antonsson 61'; Rieks (yellow card) 67', (goal) 71'; Rosenberg 83'	Report	Tanković 13', (yellow card) 23'; Sandberg (yellow card) 40'	Stadium: Swedbank Stadion; Attendance: 16 065; Referee: Kristoffer Karlsson (Sweden)

28 April 2019 Round 6	Hammarby IF	2–1	Djurgårdens IF	Stockholm
15:00	Khalili (yellow card) 15'; Đurđić 30', (yellow card) 53'; Kjartansson 39'; Bojanić (yellow card) 43'; Andersen (yellow card) 57'	Report	Buya Turay 30'; Ajdarević (yellow card) 57'; Bråtveit (yellow card) 69'; Berg (yellow card) 76'	Stadium: Tele2 Arena; Attendance: 27 554; Referee: Andreas Ekberg (Sweden)

===== May =====
5 May 2019 Round 7	Örebro SK	2–3	Hammarby IF	Örebro
17:30	Prodell 82'; Rogić 90+2'	Report	Fällman 44'; Đurđić 55'; Khalili 77'; Kossounou (yellow card) 84'; Kačaniklić (yellow card) 90+3'	Stadium: Behrn Arena; Attendance: 9 148; Referee: Victor Wolf (Sweden)

10 May 2019 Round 8	Hammarby IF	2–0	IK Sirius	Stockholm
19:00	Tanković 31' (pen.), 39'	Report	Arvidsson (yellow card) 54'	Stadium: Tele2 Arena; Attendance: 21 905; Referee: Kaspar Sjöberg (Sweden)

14 May 2019 Round 9	Hammarby IF	4–0	Östersunds FK	Stockholm
19:00	Andersen 4'; Kjartansson 13'; Đurđić 30'; Tanković 60' (pen.); Widgren (yellow card) 70'; Sandberg (red card) 76'	Report	Islamović (yellow card) 38'; Isherwood (yellow card) 67'; Weymans (yellow card) 76'	Stadium: Tele2 Arena; Attendance: 20 247; Referee: Kristoffer Karlsson (Sweden)

20 May 2019 Round 10	IFK Göteborg	0–0	Hammarby IF	Gothenburg
19:00	Yusuf (yellow card) 4'; Ohlsson (yellow card) 90'	Report	Đurđić (yellow card) 42' (yellow-red card) 90+4'	Stadium: Gamla Ullevi; Attendance: 14 136; Referee: Andreas Ekberg (Sweden)

27 May 2019 Round 11	Hammarby IF	2–2	IFK Norrköping	Stockholm
19:00	Kjartansson 2'; Khalili (yellow card) 18'; Andersen (yellow card) 43'; Tanković (yellow card) 60', (goal) 72'; Jean (yellow card) 71'; Kossounou (yellow card) 90+3'	Report	Nyman 16'; Larsson 33'; Lauritsen (yellow card) 90+1'	Stadium: Tele2 Arena; Attendance: 22 654; Referee: Bojan Pandžić (Sweden)

===== June =====
2 June 2019 Round 12	AIK	2–0	Hammarby IF	Solna
15:00	Larsson 17', 19'	Report	Sandberg (yellow card) 29'; Widgren (yellow card) 40'	Stadium: Friends Arena; Attendance: 32 861; Referee: Glenn Nyberg (Sweden)

===== July =====
1 July 2019 Round 13	BK Häcken	2–0	Hammarby IF	Gothenburg
19:00	Ekpolo (yellow card) 8'; Mohammed 42'; Faltsetas (yellow card) 44'; Hammar (yellow card) 45+4'; Jeremejeff 81'	Report	Khalili (yellow card) 33'; Fällman (yellow card) 43'; Fenger (red card) 44'	Stadium: Bravida Arena; Attendance: 4 897; Referee: Glenn Nyberg (Sweden)

7 July 2019 Round 14	Hammarby IF	6–2	Falkenbergs FF	Stockholm
15:00	Kačaniklić 8', 56', 57'; Kjartansson 13', (yellow card) 90+2'; Đurđić 18', 73' (pen.)	Report	Björkengren (yellow card) 45'; Pogrebnyak (yellow card) 60'; Joza 78'; Özen (yellow card) 78' (yellow-red card) 90+3'; Robin Östlind 88'	Stadium: Tele2 Arena; Attendance: 18 475; Referee: Bojan Pandžić (Sweden)

15 July 2019 Round 15	GIF Sundsvall	2–3	Hammarby IF	Sundsvall
15:00	Gracia (yellow card) 29', (goal) 33'; Eriksson 59'; Ciércoles (yellow card) 73'	Report	Andersen (yellow card) 27'; Bojanić 30'; Tanković 41'; Kjartansson 90+2'	Stadium: NP3 Arena; Attendance: 6 020; Referee: Mohammed Al-Hakim (Sweden)

23 July 2019 Round 16	Hammarby IF	5–2	IF Elfsborg	Stockholm
19:00	Khalili 18', 31'; Gregersen 28' (o.g.); Tanković 39'; Kačaniklić 63'; Sandberg (yellow card) 77'	Report	Strand (yellow card) 13'; Frick 45+1'; Karlsson 47'; Holst (yellow card) 56'; Holmén (yellow card) 72'; Portillo (yellow card) 74'; Hümmet (yellow card) 84'	Stadium: Tele2 Arena; Attendance: 21 161; Referee: Andreas Ekberg (Sweden)

27 July 2019 Round 17	AFC Eskilstuna	1–6	Hammarby IF	Eskilstuna
18:00	Kozica 12'; Raskaj (yellow card) 25'; Hodžić (yellow card) 62'	Report	Đurđić 18', 33', 67'; Kačaniklić 23'; Khalili 50'; Tanković 54'	Stadium: Tunavallen; Attendance: 7 037; Referee: Mohammed Al-Hakim (Sweden)

===== August =====
4 August 2019 Round 18	Kalmar FF	2–2	Hammarby IF	Kalmar
15:00	Akas (yellow card) 33'; Rafael (yellow card) 36'; Agardius (yellow card) 39'; Fröling 79' (pen.); Löfkvist 84'	Report	Solheim 41'; Blažević (red card) 59'; Tanković 64'; Kačaniklić (yellow card) 79'; Đurđić (yellow card) 89'	Stadium: Guldfågeln Arena; Attendance: 9 116; Referee: Victor Wolf (Sweden)

11 August 2019 Round 19	Hammarby IF	2–1	Helsingborgs IF	Stockholm
17:30	Kačaniklić 22'; Tanković 38'; Rodić (yellow card) 90+2'	Report	Farnerud 82'	Stadium: Tele2 Arena; Attendance: 22 137; Referee: Kristoffer Karlsson (Sweden)

17 August 2019 Round 20	Hammarby IF	3–0	GIF Sundsvall	Stockholm
16:00	Kačaniklić 15'; Tanković 35'; Bojanić (yellow card) 59'; Ciércoles 84' (o.g.)	Report	Gracia (yellow card) 55'; Ciércoles (yellow card) 59'	Stadium: Tele2 Arena; Attendance: 21 337; Referee: Kaspar Sjöberg (Sweden)

26 August 2019 Round 21	Falkenbergs FF	0–2	Hammarby IF	Falkenberg
19:00	Björkengren (yellow card) 73'; Chibuike (yellow card) 85'	Report	Bojanić 15', 45+1', (yellow card) 58'; Andersen (yellow card) 72'	Stadium: Falcon Alkoholfri Arena; Attendance: 4 328; Referee: Andreas Ekberg (Sweden)

===== September =====
1 September 2019 Round 22	IFK Norrköping	2–0	Hammarby IF	Norrköping
17:30	Dagerstål 45+3'; Larsen (yellow card) 61'; Hakšabanović 90+5'	Report	Đurđić (yellow card) 61' (yellow-red card) 90+6'	Stadium: Östgötaporten; Attendance: 13 125; Referee: Glenn Nyberg (Sweden)

15 September 2019 Round 23	Hammarby IF	6–2	IFK Göteborg	Stockholm
15:00	Rodić 2'; Bojanić 7', (yellow card) 43'; Khalili 13'; Magyar 55'; Andersen (yellow card) 58'; Fenger 61'; Tanković 85'	Report	Kharaishvili 19', 57', (yellow card) 60'; Toko (yellow card) 43'	Stadium: Tele2 Arena; Attendance: 26 552; Referee: Kristoffer Karlsson (Sweden)

22 September 2019 Round 24	Hammarby IF	2–1	AIK	Stockholm
15:00	Rodić 30', (yellow card) 31', (goal) 56'; Kačaniklić (yellow card) 71'	Report	Sigþórsson (yellow card) 34'; Mets 67', (yellow card) 69'; Linnér (yellow card) 71'	Stadium: Tele2 Arena; Attendance: 27 329; Referee: Kristoffer Karlsson (Sweden)

25 September 2019 Round 25	IK Sirius	1–3	Hammarby IF	Uppsala
19:00	Andersson 85'	Report	Andersen (yellow card) 33', (goal) 68'; Martinsson Ngouali 53'; Tanković 74'	Stadium: Studenternas IP; Attendance: 6 035; Referee: Magnus Lindgren (Sweden)

30 September 2019 Round 26	Hammarby IF	5–1	Örebro SK	Stockholm
19:00	Rodić 39', 63', 81'; Đurđić 58'; Solheim (yellow card) 79', (goal) 90+4'	Report	Prodell 11'	Stadium: Tele2 Arena; Attendance: 23 194; Referee: Martin Strömbergsson (Sweden)

===== October =====
6 October 2019 Round 27	Djurgårdens IF	1–2	Hammarby IF	Stockholm
15:00	Karlström (yellow card) 62'; Turay 74'	Report	Fenger (yellow card) 45'; Andersen (yellow card) 50' (yellow-red card) 59'; Đurđić 53'; Kačaniklić 56'; Tanković (yellow card) 75'; Blažević (yellow card) 82'	Stadium: Tele2 Arena; Attendance: 25 053; Referee: Kristoffer Karlsson (Sweden)

20 October 2019 Round 28	Hammarby IF	2–0	Malmö FF	Stockholm
15:00	Kačaniklić 15'; Khalili (yellow card) 70'; Widgren (yellow card) 79'; Magyar 88'	Report	Traustason (yellow card) 42'; Beijmo (yellow card) 44'; Lewicki (yellow card) 45+1'; Bachirou (yellow card) 65'; Larsson (yellow card) 87'	Stadium: Tele2 Arena; Attendance: 29 117; Referee: Glenn Nyberg (Sweden)

27 October 2019 Round 29	Östersunds FK	1–2	Hammarby IF	Östersund
17:45	Weymans (yellow card) 64'; Kroon 84'; Mensiro (yellow card) 88'	Report	Khalili 50'; Đurđić 72', (yellow card) 88'	Stadium: Jämtkraft Arena; Attendance: 6 395; Referee: Martin Strömbergsson (Sweden)

===== November =====
2 November 2019 Round 30	Hammarby IF	4–1	BK Häcken	Stockholm
13:00	Mads Fenger (yellow card) 2'; Magyar (yellow card) 17'; Kačaniklić 35'; Đurđić 66'; Đurđić 66'; Lindgren 70' (o.g.); Solheim 90+5'	Report	Youssef (yellow card) 4'; Nilsson 51'; Lindgren (yellow card) 88'	Stadium: Tele2 Arena; Attendance: 31 037; Referee: Mohammed Al-Hakim (Sweden)

=== Svenska Cupen ===
==== 2018–19 ====
The tournament continued from the 2018 season.

Kickoff times are in UTC+1.

===== Group 4 =====
Pos	Team	Pld	W	D	L	GF	GA	GD	Pts	Qualification
1	Hammarby IF	3	2	1	0	7	2	+5	7	Advance to Knockout stage
2	Dalkurd FF	3	2	0	1	4	3	+1	6	
3	Eskilsminne IF	3	0	2	1	2	4	−2	2	
4	Varbergs BoIS	3	0	1	2	1	5	−4	1	

Updated to match(es) played on 4 March 2019. Source: Swedish Football Association
Rules for classification: 1) Points; 2) Goal difference; 3) Goals scored; 4) Head-to-head record; 5) Highest ranked team

18 February 2019 Matchday 1	Hammarby IF	3–0	Varbergs BoIS	Stockholm
19:00	Đurđić 7'; Widgren (yellow card) 22'; Svendsen 57'; Solheim 90+4'	Report	Möller (yellow card) 33'	Stadium: Tele2 Arena; Attendance: 11,140; Referee: Magnus Lindgren (Sweden)

24 February 2019 Matchday 2	Eskilsminne IF	1–1	Hammarby IF	Helsingborg
15:00	Egger 21'; Peterson (yellow card) 25'; Egger (yellow card) 43'	Report	Tanković (yellow card) 7'; Khalili 37'; Andersen (yellow card) 65'	Stadium: Olympiafältet; Attendance: 1,541; Referee: Per Melin (Sweden)

4 March 2019 Matchday 3	Hammarby IF	3–1	Dalkurd FF	Stockholm
19:00	Andersen 31'; Fenger 38', 87'	Report	Tranberg 7', (yellow card) 57'; Ayaz (yellow card) 57'; Jasarevic (yellow card) 80'; Lawan (yellow card) 45' (yellow-red card) 81'; Ismail (yellow card) 81'	Stadium: Tele2 Arena; Attendance: 11,470; Referee: Victor Wolf (Sweden)

===== Knockout stage =====
10 March 2019 Quarter-finals	Djurgårdens IF	0–0 (a.e.t.) (4–2 p)	Hammarby IF	Stockholm
15:00	Buya Turay (yellow card) 12'; Käck (yellow card) 78'	Report	Kossounou (yellow card) 24'	Stadium: Tele2 Arena; Attendance: 20,750; Referee: Glenn Nyberg (Sweden)
	Penalties
	Walker (penalty missed); Danielsson (penalty scored); Ulvestad (penalty scored); Karlström (penalty scored); Fonn Witry (penalty scored)		Andersen (penalty missed); Fenger (penalty scored); Đurđić (penalty missed); Tanković (penalty scored)

==== 2019–20 ====
The tournament continues into the 2020 season.

===== Qualification stage =====
21 August 2019 Round 2	IFK Luleå	1–3	Hammarby IF	Luleå
18:30	Olausson 29' (pen.); Assam (yellow card) 77'	Report	Đurđić 9', (yellow card) 36'; Tanković 12'; Magyar (yellow card) 29'; Kačaniklić 68'	Stadium: Skogsvallen; Attendance: 3 935; Referee: Tess Olofsson (Sweden)
