= 2020–21 Svenska Cupen =

Tournament details
- Country: Sweden
- Dates: 30 July 2020 – 30 May 2021
- Teams: 96

Final positions
- Champions: Hammarby IF
- Runners-up: BK Häcken

The 2020–21 Svenska Cupen was the 65th season of the Svenska Cupen and the ninth season with the current format. Hammarby won the cup for the first time and secured a spot in the second qualifying round of the 2021–22 UEFA Europa Conference League. A total of 96 clubs entered the competition, 64 teams from district sites and 32 from the Allsvenskan and the Superettan.

== Round and draw dates ==
The schedule of the competition was as follows:

Phase	Round	Draw date	Match date
Initial rounds	Round 1	TBD	30 July – 26 August 2020
Initial rounds	Round 2	28 August 2020	30 September – 1 October 2020
Group stage	Matchday 1	7 December 2020	20-22 February 2021
Group stage	Matchday 2	7 December 2020	27 February - 1 March 2021
Group stage	Matchday 3	7 December 2020	6-7 March 2021
Knockout stage	Quarterfinals	TBA	13 March - 1 April 2021
Knockout stage	Semi-finals	TBA	20 March - 4 April 2021
Knockout stage	Final	TBA	30 May 2021

== Teams ==
Round	Clubs remaining	Clubs involved	Winners from previous round	New entries this round	Leagues participating in this round
Round 1	96	64	0	64	Division 1 (18 teams); Division 2 (33 teams); Division 3 (10 teams); Division 4 (2 teams); Division 5 (1 team)
Round 2	64	64	32	32	Allsvenskan (16 teams); Superettan (16 teams)
Group stage	32	32	32	0	TBA

== Round 1 ==
First round matches were played between 30 July and 16 September. 64 clubs from the third tier or lower of the Swedish league system competed in this round.

30 July 2020	Ängelholms FF (4)	1–1 (2–4 p)	Lunds BK (3)	Ängelholm
19:00 CEST (UTC+2)	Olsson 23'	Report	Hansson 83'	Stadium: Ängelholms IP; Referee: Bobby Sjögren-Engels

31 July 2020	BK Forward (4)	1–0	IF Karlstad (3)	Örebro
19:00 CEST (UTC+2)	Ponciano 81'	Report		Stadium: Trängens IP; Attendance: 50; Referee: Jim Eriksson

1 August 2020	Assyriska BK (4)	5–3	Onsala BK (4)	Gothenburg
13:00 CEST (UTC+2)	Neves 6'; Choulabi 37'; Korenado 54'; Garis 62'; Luzayadio 85'	Report	Nåfors 18'; Dehlryd 76'; Karlsson 90+4'	Stadium: Ruddalens IP; Referee: Mergim Rexhepi

1 August 2020	IFK Stocksund (4)	0–1	Vasalunds IF (3)	Danderyd
14:00 CEST (UTC+2)		Report		Stadium: Danderyds gymnasium Referee: Mohammad Dabestani

2 August 2020	Värtans IK (5)	2–4 (a.e.t.)	FC Gute (4)	Stockholm
14:00 CEST (UTC+2)	Hansebjer 8', 96'	Report	Ali 84'; Stals 112'; Hodin 114', 120'	Stadium: Östermalms IP; Referee: Jonathan Varli

2 August 2020	Skiljebo SK (4)	1–2	Karlslunds IF (3)	Hamre IP, Västerås
14:00 CEST (UTC+2)	Norgren 28'	Report	Habib 61'; Höijer 90+2'	Referee: Erik Nordqvist

2 August 2020	IF Karlstad Fotbollsutveckling (4)	2–1	IFK Åmål (4)	Våxnäs IP, Karlstad
16:00 CEST (UTC+2)	Augustsson 50'; Palenius 58'	Report	Ertürk 78'	Referee: Rasmus Ekelund

2 August 2020	Kvarnsvedens IK (4)	0–3	Sandvikens IF (3)	Ljungbergsplanen, Borlänge
17:00 CEST (UTC+2)		Report	Håkansson 32'; Englund 54'; 72' (o.g.)	Referee: Martin Thorén

4 August 2020	Stenungsunds IF (4)	1–0	FC Trollhättan (3)	Nösnäsvallen, Stenungsund
19:00 CEST (UTC+2)	Bergholtz 85'	Report		Attendance: 50; Referee: George Jansizian

4 August 2020	Kristianstad FC (4)	2–3 (a.e.t.)	Torns IF (3)	Kristianstads Fotbollsarena, Kristianstad
19:00 CEST (UTC+2)	Eichmüller 62'; Polozen 80'	Report	Zadran 72'; Mustafa 76', 116'	Referee: Jovan Krsmanovic

4 August 2020	FC Rosengård 1917 (4)	1–2 (a.e.t.)	Landskrona BoIS (3)	Rosengårds Södra IP, Malmö
19:00 CEST (UTC+2)	Sakirovski 90'	Report	Wihlstrand 84'; Kvist 118'	Referee: Oscar Johnson

18 August 2020	Assyriska IF (4)	5–3	Oskarshamns AIK (3)	Mamre IP, Norrköping
19:00 CEST (UTC+2)	Neves 6'; Choulabi 37'; Andersson 54'; Garis 62'; Luzayadio 85'	Report	Nåfors 18'; Dehlryd 76'; Karlsson 90+4'

19 August 2020	IF Lödde (5)	1–0	Eskilsminne IF (3)	Tolvans IP, Löddeköpinge
18:30 CEST (UTC+2)		Report

19 August 2020	Hudiksvalls FF (4)	2–1	Ytterhogdals IK (4)	Glysisvallen, Hudiksvall
19:00 CEST (UTC+2)	Lööf 37'; Smedbakken 89'	Report	Gurung 57'

19 August 2020	Karlbergs BK (4)	1–3	IF Brommapojkarna (3)	Stadshagens IP, Stockholm
19:00 CEST (UTC+2)	Fernández 39'	Report	Faraj 10'; Sandén 30', 44'

19 August 2020	Trosa Vagnhärad SK (4)	0–6	Sollentuna FK (3)	Häradsvallen, Trosa
19:00 CEST (UTC+2)		Report	Ali 2', 22', 80'; Jelassi 25'; Stenstrand 55'; Lagerbielke 89'

19 August 2020	Enskede IK (4)	2–4	Täby FK (3)	Stockholm
19:00 CEST (UTC+2)		Report		Stadium: Enskede IP; Referee: Hamza Harrami

19 August 2020	Vänersborgs FK (4)	2–2 (2–4 p)	Utsiktens BK (3)	Vänersvallen, Vänersborg
19:00 CEST (UTC+2)		Report

19 August 2020	Newroz FC (4)	4–2 (a.e.t.)	Gamla Upsala SK (4)	Stockholm
19:30 CEST (UTC+2)		Report		Stadium: Sätra IP

19 August 2020	IK Sleipner (5)	1–2	Nyköpings BIS (3)	Nya Parken, Norrköping
19:30 CEST (UTC+2)	Viktor Sjöberg 14'	Report	Jarrett-Marston 32'

25 August 2020	Anderstorps IF (5)	0–3	BK Astrio (5)	Anderstorps IP, Anderstorp
18:30 CEST (UTC+2)		svenskfotboll.se/matchfakta/anderstorps-if-bk-astrio-svenska-cupen-herrar/4702624/

25 August 2020	Angered BK (5)	1–0	IFK Falköping (5)	Hjällbovallen, Gothenburg
18:30 CEST (UTC+2)		Report

25 August 2020	IS Halmia (4)	3–1	Lindome GIF (3)	Örjans Vall, Halmstad
19:00 CEST (UTC+2)		Report

25 August 2020	Enköpings SK (4)	2–3	IFK Haninge (3)	Enavallen, Enköping
19:30 CEST (UTC+2)		Report

26 August 2020	Ekedalens SK (6)	3–1	Gnosjö IF (5)	Idrottsparken, Ekedalen
17:50 CEST (UTC+2)		Report

26 August 2020	Gottne IF (4)	5–0	Stöde IF (4)	Haraldsängen, Gottne
18:00 CEST (UTC+2)		Report

26 August 2020	Åryds IK (5)	1-2	Asarums IF (4)	Åryds IP, Åryd
18:45 CEST (UTC+2)		Report

26 August 2020	Bodens BK (4)	1–1 (4–3 p)	Team TG FF (3)	Boden
19:00 CEST (UTC+2)		Report		Stadium: Boden Arena; Referee: Pontus Olofsson

26 August 2020	Boxholms IF (6)	1-4	Husqvarna FF (4)	Svartåvallen, Boxholm
19:00 CEST (UTC+2)		Report

26 August 2020	Hisingsbacka FC (5)	3-4	IK Gauthiod (4)	Backavallen, Gothenburg
19:30 CEST (UTC+2)		Report

26 August 2020	Rosersbergs IK (7)	1-4	FC Stockholm Internazionale (4)	Råbergsvallen, Rosersberg
20:00		Report

16 September 2020	Hässleholms IF (4)	1–0	Räppe GoIF (4)	Hässleholm
19:00 CEST (UTC+2)		Report		Stadium: Österås IP; Referee: Mohamed Rachid

== Round 2 ==
64 teams will compete in this round: 32 winners from Round 1 and the 32 teams from the 2020 Allsvenskan and 2020 Superettan. All games will be played on 30 September–1 October 2020.

=== Seeding ===
Section	Seeded teams		Unseeded teams	
North	AIK (1)	Djurgårdens IF (1)	BK Forward (4)	IFK Timrå (4)
North	Hammarby IF (1)	IFK Norrköping (1)	Dagsbergs IF (6)	Nyköpings BIS (3)
North	IK Sirius (1)	Örebro SK (1)	Enskede IK (4)	Sollentuna FK (3)
North	Östersunds FK (1)	AFC Eskilstuna (2)	FC Gute (4)	Forssa BK (5)
North	Akropolis IF (2)	Dalkurd FF (2)	Gamla Upsala SK (4)	Carlstad United BK (3)
North	Degerfors IF (2)	GIF Sundsvall (2)	Gottne IF (4)	Karlstad BK (3)
North	IK Brage (2)	Jönköpings Södra IF (2)	IFK Luleå (4)	IFK Lidingö FK (4)
North	Umeå FC (2)	Västerås SK (2)	IFK Stocksund (4)	Sandvikens IF (3)
South	BK Häcken (1)	Falkenbergs FF (1)	Landskrona BoIS (3)	Lunds BK (3)
South	Helsingborgs IF (1)	IF Elfsborg (1)	Oskarshamns AIK (3)	Torns IF (3)
South	IFK Göteborg (1)	Kalmar FF (1)	Utsiktens BK (3)	Asarums IF (4)
South	Malmö FF (1)	Mjällby AIF (1)	Assyriska BK (4)	Husqvarna FF (4)
South	Varbergs BoIS (1)	GAIS (2)	Hässleholms IF (4)	IK Gauthiod (4)
South	Halmstads BK (2)	Ljungskile SK (2)	IS Halmia (4)	Stenungsunds IF (4)
South	Norrby IF (2)	Trelleborgs FF (2)	Angered BK (5)	BK Astrio (5)
South	Örgryte IS (2)	Östers IF (2)	IF Lödde (5)	Ekedalens SK (6)

=== Matches ===
29 September 2020	Vasalunds IF (3)	0–5	IK Brage (2)	Solna
15:30		Report		Stadium: Skytteholms IP; Referee: Johan Krantz

30 September 2020	Bodens BK (4)	0–3	Västerås SK (2)	Boden
15:30		Report		Stadium: Boden Arena; Referee: Joel Bäckström

30 September 2020	BK Forward (4)	0–3	Akropolis IF (2)	Örebro
16:00		Report		Stadium: Trängens IP; Referee: Mohammed Al-Hakim

30 September 2020	IK Gauthiod (4)	1–0	Ljungskile SK (2)	Grästorp
16:00		Report		Stadium: Lunnevi IP; Referee: Haris Memisevic

30 September 2020	Angered BK (5)	1–3	BK Häcken (1)	Gothenburg
16:30		Report		Stadium: Hjällbovallen; Referee: Granit Maqedonci

30 September 2020	BK Astrio (5)	0–9	Falkenbergs FF (1)	Halmstad
16:30		Report		Stadium: Söndrums IP; Referee: Robert Daradic

30 September 2020	Sandvikens IF (3)	2–0	Jönköpings Södra IF (2)	Sandviken
18:00		Report		Stadium: Jernvallen; Referee: Glenn Nyberg

30 September 2020	FC Stockholm Internazionale	1–3 (a.e.t.)	Degerfors IF (2)	Stockholm
18:30		Report		Stadium: Stadshagens IP; Referee: Victor Wolf

30 September 2020	Täby FK	0–2	AFC Eskilstuna (2)	Täby
18:30		Report		Stadium: Vikingavallen; Referee: Adam Ladebäck

30 September 2020	Stenungsunds IF (4)	0–3	IF Elfsborg (1)	Stenungsund
18:30		Report		Stadium: SIF-gården; Attendance: 50; Referee: Magnus Lindgren

30 September 2020	IS Halmia (4)	0–3	Helsingborgs IF (1)	Halmstad
18:30		Report		Stadium: Örjans Vall; Attendance: 50; Referee: Joakim Östling

30 September 2020	Torns IF (3)	2–3 (a.e.t.)	Trelleborgs FF (2)	Stångby
18:30		Report		Stadium: Tornvallen; Attendance: 50; Referee: Kaspar Sjöberg

30 September 2020	Assyriska BK (4)	0–5	Mjällby AIF (1)	Gothenburg
18:30		Report		Stadium: Ruddalens IP; Referee: Antti Kanerva

30 September 2020	Oskarshamns AIK (3)	0–0 (a.e.t.) (5–3 p)	Varbergs BoIS (1)	Oskarshamn
18:30		Report		Stadium: Arena Oskarshamn; Attendance: 50; Referee: Andreas Dufva-Johansson

30 September 2020	Husqvarna FF (4)	1–3	IFK Göteborg (1)	Huskvarna
18:30		Report		Stadium: Vapenvallen; Attendance: 49; Referee: Richard Sundell

30 September 2020	Landskrona BoIS (3)	1–0	Östers IF (2)	Landskrona
18:30		Report		Stadium: Landskrona IP; Attendance: 50; Referee: Fredrik Klitte

1 October 2020	Asarums IF (4)	1–4	Kalmar FF (1)	Asarum
16:30		Report		Stadium: Asarums IP; Referee: Rinon Hasani

1 October 2020	IF Karlstad Fotbollsutveckling (3)	1–2	Dalkurd FF (2)	Karlstad
17:00		Report		Stadium: Tingvalla IP; Attendance: 50; Referee: Enzo Vesprini

1 October 2020	Karlslunds IF (3)	1–2	AIK (1)	Örebro
18:30		Report		Stadium: Karlslund Arena; Attendance: 50; Referee: Farouk Nehdi

1 October 2020	Utsiktens BK (3)	1–0 (a.e.t.)	Norrby IF (2)	Gothenburg
18:30		Report		Stadium: Ruddalens IP; Attendance: 50; Referee: Bojan Pandzic

6 October 2020	Hässleholms IF (4)	1–5	Halmstads BK (2)	Hässleholm
19:00		Report		Stadium: Österås IP; Attendance: 50; Referee: Kaspar Sjöberg

7 October 2020	Hudiksvalls FF (4)	0–3	GIF Sundsvall (2)	Hudiksvall
18:30		Report		Stadium: Glysis Sparbanken Arena; Attendance: 50; Referee: Farouk Nehdi

8 October 2020	Gottne IF (4)	0–6	IFK Norrköping FK (1)	Gottne
15:00		Report		Stadium: Haraldsängen; Attendance: 49; Referee: Henrik Mohlin

8 October 2020	IF Lödde (5)	2–1	Örgryte IS (2)	Löddeköpinge
16:00		Report		Stadium: Tolvans IP; Attendance: 50; Referee: Fikret Buqa

15 October 2020	Nyköpings BIS (3)	2–4	Östersunds FK (1)	Nyköping
13:30		Report		Stadium: Rosvalla IP; Referee: Johan Krantz

18 October 2020	Ekedalens SK (6)	0–2	GAIS (2)	Ekedalen
13:00		Report		Stadium: Idrottsparken; Attendance: 50; Referee: Fikret Buqa

21 October 2020	IFK Haninge (3)	1–2	Örebro SK (1)	Haninge
19:30		Report		Stadium: Torvalla IP; Referee: Farouk Nehdi

11 November 2020	IF Brommapojkarna (3)	1–3	IK Sirius (1)	Stockholm
19:00		Report		Stadium: Grimsta IP; Attendance: 50; Referee: Patrik Eriksson

12 November 2020	FC Gute (4)	0–5	Hammarby IF (1)	Visby
18:00		Report		Stadium: Gutavallen; Attendance: 295; Referee: Adam Ladebäck

19 November 2020	Sollentuna FK (3)	0–4	Djurgårdens IF (1)	Sollentuna
18:30		Report		Stadium: Sollentunavallen; Referee: Fredrik Hansson

2 December 2020	Lunds BK (3)	0–3 (awd)	Malmö FF (1)
19:00		Report

31 January 2021	Newroz FC (4)	0–5	Umeå FC (2)	Stockholm
17:00		Report		Stadium: Stadshagens IP; Referee: Suhel Youssef

== Group stage ==
The 32 winners from round 2 will be divided into eight groups of four teams. The 16 highest ranked winners from the previous rounds will be seeded to the top two positions in each group and the 16 remaining winners will be unseeded in the draw. The ranking of the 16 seeded teams will be decided by league position in the 2020 season. All teams in the group stage will play each other once, the highest-ranked teams from the previous rounds and teams from tier three or lower will have the right to play two home matches.

=== Qualified teams ===
Seeded

- AIK (1)
- BK Häcken (1)
- Djurgårdens IF (1)
- Falkenbergs FF (1)
- Hammarby IF (1)
- Helsingborgs IF (1)
- IF Elfsborg (1)
- IFK Göteborg (1)
- IK Sirius (1)
- IFK Norrköping (1)
- Kalmar FF (1)
- Malmö FF (1)
- Mjällby AIF (1)
- Örebro SK (1)
- Östersunds FK (1)
- Halmstads BK (2)

Unseeded

- AFC Eskilstuna (2)
- Akropolis IF (2)
- Dalkurd FF (2)
- Degerfors IF (2)
- GAIS (2)
- GIF Sundsvall (2)
- IK Brage (2)
- Trelleborgs FF (2)
- Umeå FC (2)
- Västerås SK (2)
- Landskrona BoIS (3)
- Oskarshamns AIK (3)
- Sandvikens IF (3)
- Utsiktens BK (3)
- IK Gauthiod (4)
- IF Lödde (5)

=== Group 1 ===
Pos	Team	Pld	W	D	L	GF	GA	GD	Pts	Qualification	VSK	GAIS	MFF	HBK
1	Västerås SK	3	2	1	0	5	1	+4	7	Advance to Knockout stage		3–0		
2	GAIS	3	2	0	1	3	3	0	6				1–0	
3	Malmö FF	3	1	0	2	5	4	+1	3		1–2			4–1
4	Halmstads BK	3	0	1	2	1	6	−5	1		0–0	0–2		

Updated to match(es) played on 6 March 2021. Source: Swedish Football Association
Rules for classification: 1) Points; 2) Goal difference; 3) Goals scored; 4) Head-to-head record; 5) Highest ranked team

21 February 2021 Matchday 1	Halmstads BK	0−2	GAIS	Halmstad
13:00 (UTC+1)		Report	Grozdanic 21'; Andersson 82'	Stadium: Skedalahed IP; Referee: Andreas Ekberg

21 February 2021 Matchday 1	Malmö FF	1−2	Västerås SK	Malmö
13:00 (UTC+1)	Christiansen 50'	Report	Ribeiro 39'; Johansson 65'	Stadium: Malmö IP; Referee: Kristoffer Karlsson

27 February 2021 Matchday 2	Halmstads BK	0−0	Västerås SK	Halmstad
15:00 (UTC+1)		Report		Stadium: Skedalahed IP; Referee: Enzo Vesprini

1 March 2021 Matchday 2	GAIS	1−0	Malmö FF	Gothenburg
19:00 (UTC+1)	Maric 12'	Report		Stadium: Bravida Arena; Referee: Bojan Pandzic

6 March 2021 Matchday 3	Västerås SK	3−0	GAIS	Västerås
13:00 (UTC+1)	Prodell 23'; Salmon 90'; Lagerbielke 90+3'	Report		Stadium: Iver Arena; Referee: Arian Chalak

6 March 2021 Matchday 3	Malmö FF	4−1	Halmstads BK	Malmö
13:00 (UTC+1)	Antonsson 33'; Nanasi 51'; Toivonen 54'; Sarr 74'	Report	Al-Ammari 40'	Stadium: Malmö IP; Referee: Fredrik Klitte

=== Group 2 ===
Pos	Team	Pld	W	D	L	GF	GA	GD	Pts	Qualification	DEG	IFE	FFF	UTS
1	Degerfors IF	3	3	0	0	6	1	+5	9	Advance to Knockout stage				2–0
2	IF Elfsborg	3	2	0	1	7	4	+3	6		0–1		3–2	
3	Falkenbergs FF	3	1	0	2	6	7	−1	3		1–3			
4	Utsiktens BK	3	0	0	3	2	9	−7	0			1–4	1–3	

Updated to match(es) played on 6 March 2021. Source: Swedish Football Association
Rules for classification: 1) Points; 2) Goal difference; 3) Goals scored; 4) Head-to-head record; 5) Highest ranked team

22 February 2021 Matchday 1	IF Elfsborg	0−1	Degerfors IF	Borås
19:00 (UTC+1)		Report	Abraham 61'	Stadium: Ryda fotbollshall Referee: Bojan Pandzic

22 February 2021 Matchday 1	Utsiktens BK	1−3	Falkenbergs FF	Gothenburg
19:00 (UTC+1)	Olsson 56'	Report	Bergmark Wiberg 15', 25', 83'	Stadium: Bravida Arena; Referee: Joakim Östling

28 February 2021 Matchday 2	Falkenbergs FF	1−3	Degerfors IF	Falkenberg
15:00 (UTC+1)	Bergmark Wiberg 34'	Report	Carlén 23'; Edvardsen 40'; Saidi 69'	Stadium: Vinåvallen; Referee: Victor Wolf

28 February 2021 Matchday 2	Utsiktens BK	1−4	IF Elfsborg	Gothenburg
17:00 (UTC+1)	Skoglund 31'	Report	Okkels 15'; Frick 61'; Ndione 79'; Ondrejka 80'	Stadium: Bravida Arena; Referee: Magnus Lindgren

6 March 2021 Matchday 3	Degerfors IF	2–0	Utsiktens BK	Degerfors
15:00 (UTC+1)	Abraham 30'; Lindell 48'	Report		Stadium: Stora Valla; Referee: Andreas Dufva-Johansson

6 March 2021 Matchday 3	IF Elfsborg	3–2	Falkenbergs FF	Borås
15:00 (UTC+1)	Alm 30'; Larsson 50'; Strand 87'	Report	Bergmark Wiberg 48', 89'	Stadium: Borås Arena; Referee: Kristoffer Karlsson

=== Group 3 ===
Pos	Team	Pld	W	D	L	GF	GA	GD	Pts	Qualification	BKH	DAL	HIF	IKG
1	BK Häcken	3	2	1	0	6	1	+5	7	Advance to Knockout stage		2–0	1–1	
2	Dalkurd FF	3	2	0	1	7	3	+4	6					5–0
3	Helsingborgs IF	3	0	2	1	3	4	−1	2			1–2		
4	IK Gauthiod	3	0	1	2	1	9	−8	1		0–3		1–1	

Updated to match(es) played on 7 March 2021. Source: SFA
Rules for classification: 1) Points; 2) Goal difference; 3) Goals scored; 4) Head-to-head record; 5) Highest ranked team

21 February 2021 Matchday 1	BK Häcken	2−0	Dalkurd FF	Gothenburg
15:00		Report		Stadium: Bravida Arena; Attendance: TBA; Referee: Magnus Lindgren

21 February 2021 Matchday 1	IK Gauthiod	1−1	Helsingborgs IF	Vänersborg
15:00		Report		Stadium: Vänersvallen; Attendance: TBA; Referee: Richard Sundell

27 February 2021 Matchday 2	IK Gauthiod	0−3	BK Häcken	Vänersborg
15:00		Report		Stadium: Vänersvallen; Attendance: TBA; Referee: TBA

27 February 2021 Matchday 2	Helsingborgs IF	1−2	Dalkurd FF	Helsingborg
15:00		Report		Stadium: Olympiafältet; Attendance: TBA; Referee: Kaspar Sjöberg

7 March 2021 Matchday 3	BK Häcken	1−1	Helsingborgs IF	Gothenburg
15:00		Report		Stadium: Bravida Arena; Attendance: TBA; Referee: TBA

7 March 2021 Matchday 3	Dalkurd FF	5−0	IK Gauthiod	Uppsala
15:00		Report		Stadium: Studenternas IP; Attendance: TBA; Referee: TBA

=== Group 4 ===
Pos	Team	Pld	W	D	L	GF	GA	GD	Pts	Qualification	DIF	IKB	KFF	UFC
1	Djurgårdens IF	3	3	0	0	12	1	+11	9	Advance to Knockout stage		1–0	4–1	
2	IK Brage	3	1	0	2	1	2	−1	3					1–0
3	Kalmar FF	3	1	0	2	3	6	−3	3			1–0		1–2
4	Umeå FC	3	1	0	2	2	9	−7	3		0–7			

Updated to match(es) played on 6 March 2021. Source: Swedish Football Association
Rules for classification: 1) Points; 2) Goal difference; 3) Goals scored; 4) Head-to-head record; 5) Highest ranked team

21 February 2021 Matchday 1	Kalmar FF	1−2	Umeå FC	TBA
12:00		Report		Stadium: TBA; Attendance: TBA; Referee: TBA

21 February 2021 Matchday 1	Djurgårdens IF	1−0	IK Brage	TBA
17:00		Report		Stadium: TBA; Attendance: TBA; Referee: TBA

28 February 2021 Matchday 2	Kalmar FF	1−0	IK Brage	TBA
15:00		Report		Stadium: TBA; Attendance: TBA; Referee: TBA

28 February 2021 Matchday 2	Umeå FC	0−7	Djurgårdens IF	TBA
17:00		Report		Stadium: TBA; Attendance: TBA; Referee: TBA

6 March 2021 Matchday 3	Djurgårdens IF	4−1	Kalmar FF	TBA
17:00		Report		Stadium: TBA; Attendance: TBA; Referee: TBA

6 March 2021 Matchday 3	IK Brage	1−0	Umeå FC	TBA
17:00		Report		Stadium: TBA; Attendance: TBA; Referee: TBA

=== Group 5 ===
Pos	Team	Pld	W	D	L	GF	GA	GD	Pts	Qualification	ÖFK	MAIF	BOIS	AKR
1	Östersunds FK	3	2	1	0	5	1	+4	7	Advance to Knockout stage				1–1
2	Mjällby AIF	3	2	0	1	6	2	+4	6		0–1			3–1
3	Landskrona BoIS	3	1	0	2	2	6	−4	3		0–3	0–3		
4	Akropolis IF	3	0	1	2	2	6	−4	1				0–2	

Updated to match(es) played on 7 March 2021. Source: Swedish Football Association
Rules for classification: 1) Points; 2) Goal difference; 3) Goals scored; 4) Head-to-head record; 5) Highest ranked team

21 February 2021 Matchday 1	Mjällby AIF	3−1	Akropolis IF	TBA
13:00		Report		Stadium: TBA; Attendance: TBA; Referee: TBA

21 February 2021 Matchday 1	Landskrona BoIS	0−3	Östersunds FK	TBA
17:00		Report		Stadium: TBA; Attendance: TBA; Referee: TBA

27 February 2021 Matchday 2	Landskrona BoIS	0−3	Mjällby AIF	TBA
13:00		Report		Stadium: TBA; Attendance: TBA; Referee: TBA

3 March 2021 Matchday 2	Östersunds FK	1−1	Akropolis IF	TBA
18:30		Report		Stadium: TBA; Attendance: TBA; Referee: TBA

7 March 2021 Matchday 3	Mjällby AIF	0−1	Östersunds FK	TBA
15:00		Report		Stadium: TBA; Attendance: TBA; Referee: TBA

7 March 2021 Matchday 3	Akropolis IF	0−2	Landskrona BoIS	TBA
15:00		Report		Stadium: TBA; Attendance: TBA; Referee: TBA

=== Group 6 ===
Pos	Team	Pld	W	D	L	GF	GA	GD	Pts	Qualification	IFKN	IFKG	SIF	GIF
1	IFK Norrköping	3	2	1	0	7	2	+5	7	Advance to Knockout stage		1–1		2–0
2	IFK Göteborg	3	1	2	0	6	5	+1	5					1–1
3	Sandvikens IF	3	1	0	2	7	10	−3	3		1–4	3–4		
4	GIF Sundsvall	3	0	1	2	3	6	−3	1				2–3	

Source: Swedish Football Association
Rules for classification: 1) Points; 2) Goal difference; 3) Goals scored; 4) Head-to-head record; 5) Highest ranked team

20 February 2021 Matchday 1	IFK Norrköping	2−0	GIF Sundsvall	TBA
13:00		Report		Stadium: TBA; Attendance: TBA; Referee: TBA

20 February 2021 Matchday 1	Sandvikens IF	3−4	IFK Göteborg	TBA
13:00		Report		Stadium: TBA; Attendance: TBA; Referee: TBA

28 February 2021 Matchday 2	Sandvikens IF	1−4	IFK Norrköping	TBA
13:00		Report		Stadium: TBA; Attendance: TBA; Referee: TBA

28 February 2021 Matchday 2	IFK Göteborg	1−1	GIF Sundsvall	TBA
13:00		Report		Stadium: TBA; Attendance: TBA; Referee: TBA

7 March 2021 Matchday 3	IFK Norrköping	1−1	IFK Göteborg	TBA
17:00		Report		Stadium: TBA; Attendance: TBA; Referee: TBA

7 March 2021 Matchday 3	GIF Sundsvall	2−3	Sandvikens IF	TBA
17:00		Report		Stadium: TBA; Attendance: TBA; Referee: TBA

=== Group 7 ===
Pos	Team	Pld	W	D	L	GF	GA	GD	Pts	Qualification	TFF	IKS	ÖSK	IFL
1	Trelleborgs FF	3	2	1	0	5	2	+3	7	Advance to Knockout stage				3–1
2	IK Sirius	3	1	2	0	4	3	+1	5		1–1			
3	Örebro SK	3	1	1	1	9	3	+6	4		0–1	2–2		
4	IF Lödde	3	0	0	3	1	11	−10	0			0–1	0–7	

Updated to match(es) played on 6 March 2021. Source: Swedish Football Association
Rules for classification: 1) Points; 2) Goal difference; 3) Goals scored; 4) Head-to-head record; 5) Highest ranked team

20 February 2021 Matchday 1	Örebro SK	0−1	Trelleborgs FF	TBA
15:00 (UTC+1)		Report		Stadium: TBA; Attendance: TBA; Referee: TBA

20 February 2021 Matchday 1	IF Lödde	0−1	IK Sirius	TBA
15:00 (UTC+1)		Report		Stadium: TBA; Attendance: TBA; Referee: TBA

28 February 2021 Matchday 2	IF Lödde	0−7	Örebro SK	TBA
13:00 (UTC+1)		Report		Stadium: TBA; Attendance: TBA; Referee: TBA

28 February 2021 Matchday 2	IK Sirius	1−1	Trelleborgs FF	TBA
13:00 (UTC+1)		Report		Stadium: TBA; Attendance: TBA; Referee: TBA

6 March 2021 Matchday 3	Trelleborgs FF	3−1	IF Lödde	TBA
13:00 (UTC+1)		Report		Stadium: TBA; Attendance: TBA; Referee: TBA

6 March 2021 Matchday 3	Örebro SK	2−2	IK Sirius	TBA
13:00 (UTC+1)		Report		Stadium: TBA; Attendance: TBA; Referee: TBA

=== Group 8 ===
Pos	Team	Pld	W	D	L	GF	GA	GD	Pts	Qualification	HAM	AIK	AFC	OAIK
1	Hammarby IF	3	3	0	0	10	3	+7	9	Advance to Knockout stage		3–2	4–1	
2	AIK	3	2	0	1	8	4	+4	6				4–0	
3	AFC Eskilstuna	3	1	0	2	5	9	−4	3					4–1
4	Oskarshamns AIK	3	0	0	3	2	9	−7	0		0–3	1–2		

Updated to match(es) played on 7 March 2021. Source: SFA
Rules for classification: 1) Points; 2) Goal difference; 3) Goals scored; 4) Head-to-head record; 5) Highest ranked team

20 February 2021 Matchday 1	Hammarby IF	4–1	AFC Eskilstuna	Stockholm
13:00 (UTC+1)		Report		Stadium: Tele2 Arena; Referee: Farouk Nehdi

20 February 2021 Matchday 1	Oskarshamns AIK	1–2	AIK	Oskarshamn
15:00 (UTC+1)		Report		Stadium: Arena Oskarshamn; Referee: Fredrik Klitte

27 February 2021 Matchday 2	AIK	4–0	AFC Eskilstuna	Solna
13:00 (UTC+1)		Report		Stadium: Friends Arena; Referee: Glenn Nyberg

28 February 2021 Matchday 2	Oskarshamns AIK	0–3	Hammarby IF	Oskarshamn
15:00 (UTC+1)		Report		Stadium: Arena Oskarshamn; Referee: Fredrik Hansson

7 March 2021 Matchday 3	AFC Eskilstuna	4–1	Oskarshamns AIK	Eskilstuna
13:00 (UTC+1)		Report		Stadium: Tunavallen; Attendance: TBA; Referee: TBA

7 March 2021 Matchday 3	Hammarby IF	3–2	AIK	Stockholm
13:00 (UTC+1)		Report		Stadium: Tele2 Arena; Attendance: TBA; Referee: TBA

== Knockout stage ==
=== Qualified teams ===
Pos	Grp	Team	Pld	W	D	L	GF	GA	GD	Pts	Qualification
1	4	Djurgårdens IF	3	3	0	0	12	1	+11	9	Seeded in Quarter-final draw
2	8	Hammarby IF	3	3	0	0	10	3	+7	9	Seeded in Quarter-final draw
3	2	Degerfors IF	3	3	0	0	6	1	+5	9	Seeded in Quarter-final draw
4	6	IFK Norrköping	3	2	1	0	7	2	+5	7	Seeded in Quarter-final draw
5	3	BK Häcken	3	2	1	0	6	1	+5	7	Unseeded in Quarter-final draw
6	5	Östersunds FK	3	2	1	0	5	1	+4	7	Unseeded in Quarter-final draw
7	1	Västerås SK	3	2	1	0	5	1	+4	7	Unseeded in Quarter-final draw
8	7	Trelleborgs FF	3	2	1	0	5	2	+3	7	Unseeded in Quarter-final draw

Updated to match(es) played on 7 March 2021. Source: Group results
Rules for classification: 1) Points; 2) Goal difference; 3) Goals scored; 4) Ranking in 2020 season

=== Bracket ===
Quarter-finals
14 March 2021 – Stockholm
Djurgårdens IF	3
Östersunds FK	0
1 April 2021 – Stockholm
Hammarby IF (a.e.t.)	3
Trelleborgs FF	2
13 March 2021 – Norrköping
IFK Norrköping	2
BK Häcken	3
14 March 2021 – Degerfors
Degerfors IF	3
Västerås SK (a.e.t.)	4

Semi-finals
4 April 2021 – Stockholm
Djurgårdens IF	0
Hammarby IF	1
20 March 2021 – Gothenburg
BK Häcken	3
Västerås SK	0

Final
30 May 2021 – Stockholm
Hammarby IF	0(5)
BK Häcken	0(4)

=== Quarter-finals ===
13 March 2021	IFK Norrköping	2–3	BK Häcken	Norrköping
16:00 (UTC+1)	Adegbenro 10'; Hakšabanović 35'	Report	Jeremejeff 22'; Traore 45+1'; Heintz 57'	Stadium: Nya Parken; Referee: Andreas Ekberg

14 March 2021	Degerfors IF	3–4 (a.e.t.)	Västerås SK	Degerfors
16:00 (UTC+1)	Edvardsen 36'; Abraham 82'; Bertilsson 115'	Report	Tronêt 48'; Edlund 89'; Sabetkar 98'; Span 109'	Stadium: Stora Valla; Referee: Kristoffer Karlsson

14 March 2021	Djurgårdens IF	3–0	Östersunds FK	Stockholm
13:00 (UTC+1)	Holmberg 15'; Chilufya 52'; Bärkroth 70'	Report		Stadium: Tele2 Arena; Referee: Glenn Nyberg

1 April 2021	Hammarby IF	3–2 (a.e.t.)	Trelleborgs FF	Stockholm
19:00	Andersen 10'; Ludwigson 93'; Accam 99'	Report	Petrović 87' (pen.); Kozica 110'	Stadium: Tele2 Arena; Referee: Joakim Östling

=== Semi-finals ===
20 March 2021	BK Häcken	3–0	Västerås SK	Gothenburg
15:00	Jeremejeff 34', 54'; Lagerbielke 79' (o.g.)	Report		Stadium: Bravida Arena; Attendance: TBA; Referee: TBA

4 April 2021	Djurgårdens IF	0–1	Hammarby IF	Stockholm
13:00		Report	Ouattara 17'	Stadium: Tele2 Arena; Attendance: TBA; Referee: TBA

=== Final ===
30 May 2021
14:30

Hammarby IF	0–0 (a.e.t.)	BK Häcken
	Report
Penalties
Paulinho (penalty scored); Accam (penalty scored); Fenger (penalty scored); Sher (penalty scored); Selmani (penalty scored)	5–4	Faltsetas (penalty scored); Bengtsson (penalty scored); Toivio (penalty scored); Traoré (penalty missed); Youssef (penalty scored)

Tele2 Arena, Stockholm
Attendance: 0
Referee: Kaspar Sjöberg
