= Carl Andersson =

Carl Andersson or Karl Andersson may refer to:

- Carl Andersson (athlete) (1877–1956), Swedish long-distance runner
- Carl Andersson (footballer, born 1900) (1900–1981), Swedish footballer
- Carl-Georg Andersson (1885–1961), Swedish wrestler
- Carl Andersson (wrestler) (1884–1977), Swedish wrestler
- Carl-Oscar Andersson (born 1992), Swedish footballer
- Karl Andersson (sprint canoeist), Swedish canoeist
- Karl Andersson i Eliantorp (1869–1959), Swedish politician
- Karl Björkänge (1895–1966), also known as Karl Andersson i Björkäng, Swedish politician
- Karl-Erik Andersson (1927–2005), Swedish footballer
- Karl-Ivar Andersson (born 1932), Swedish cyclist
- Karl Andersson (publisher), founder of Destroyer Magazine
- Karl Johan Andersson (1827–1867), Swedish explorer, hunter and trader
