= Zadran =

Zadran may refer to:

== People ==
- Zadran (Pashtun tribe)
- Shapoor Zadran, Afghan cricket player
- Noor Zadran, Afghan footballer
- Noor Ali Zadran, Afghan cricket player
- Dawlat Zadran, Afghan cricket player

== Other ==
- Wuza Zadran District, Afghanistan
