= Dennis Widgren =

Swedish footballer

Personal information
- Full name: Trond Dennis Widgren
- Date of birth: 28 March 1994 (age 32)
- Place of birth: Östersund, Sweden
- Height: 1.80 m (5 ft 11 in)
- Position: Left back

Team information
- Current team: Östersund
- Number: 19

Youth career
- –2008: IFK Östersund
- 2009–2010: Östersunds FK

Senior career*
Years	Team	Apps	(Gls)
2010–2018	Östersunds FK	168	(4)
2019–2022	Hammarby IF	53	(0)
2021	→ IK Sirius (loan)	18	(0)
2022–2025	IK Sirius	85	(2)
2026–	Östersund	29	(1)

International career^{‡}
2011–2013	Sweden U19	3	(0)
- * Club domestic league appearances and goals as of 11 November 2026 ‡ National team caps and goals as of 6 January 2019

Trond Dennis Widgren (born 28 March 1994) is a Swedish footballer who plays as a left back for Östersund in Superettan.

== Club career ==
=== Östersunds FK ===
Widgren started to play football at IFK Östersund, before moving to other local club Östersunds FK at age 14. He made his debut for their senior team in 2010.

During Widgren's time at the club, Östersund won several promotions from Division 2, Sweden's fourth tier, to Allsvenskan, the highest division. He was a key player for long-time manager Graham Potter's side between 2010 and 2018, also making several continental appearances in the Europa League.

Widgren was a part of the Östersund side that won Svenska Cupen in 2017, the first domestic title in the club's history.

=== Hammarby IF ===
On 2 January 2019, Widgren moved on a free transfer to fellow Allsvenskan club Hammarby IF, signing a three-and-a-half-year contract. He made 25 league appearances during his first season, as the club finished 3rd in the table.

On 30 May 2021, Widgren won the 2020–21 Svenska Cupen with Hammarby through a 5–4 win on penalties (0–0 after full-time) against BK Häcken in the final.

On 13 July 2021, Widgren was sent on loan for the remainder of the year to fellow Allsvenskan club IK Sirius. Making 18 league appearances, Widgren helped the club avoid relegation by finishing in 11th place in the table, before leaving at the end of the season.

=== IK Sirius ===
On 22 July 2022, Widgren transferred to IK Sirius on a permanent deal, signing a three-and-a-half-year contract.

== International career ==
Between 2011 and 2013, Widgren won three caps for the Swedish U19 national team. He was the first player ever from Östersunds FK to feature in a domestic national team.

== Personal life ==
Widgren was born in Östersund to a Swedish mother and a Norwegian father, thus making him eligible for the Norway national team.

== Career statistics ==
=== Club ===
As of 17 July 2022

Club	Season	Division	League		Svenska Cupen		Europe		Total	
Club	Season	Division	Apps	Goals	Apps	Goals	Apps	Goals	Apps	Goals
Östersunds FK	2010	Division 1	0	0	1	0	–		1	0
Östersunds FK	2011	Division 2	19	2	1	0	–		1	0
Östersunds FK	2012	Division 1	14	0	2	0	–		16	0
Östersunds FK	2013	Superettan	11	0	1	0	–		12	0
Östersunds FK	2014	Superettan	21	0	3	0	–		24	0
Östersunds FK	2015	Superettan	24	0	1	1	–		25	1
Östersunds FK	2016	Allsvenskan	30	0	2	0	–		32	0
Östersunds FK	2017	Allsvenskan	27	0	7	0	11 (Note: Appearances in the UEFA Europa League)	0	27	0
Östersunds FK	2018	Allsvenskan	22	2	4	0	2	0	27	0
Östersunds FK	Total		168	4	22	1	13	0	203	5
Hammarby IF	2019	Allsvenskan	25	0	2	0	–		27	0
Hammarby IF	2020	Allsvenskan	18	0	5	1	0	0	23	1
Hammarby IF	2021	Allsvenskan	2	0	0	0	0	0	2	0
Hammarby IF	2022	Allsvenskan	8	0	0	0	0	0	8	0
Hammarby IF	Total		53	0	7	1	0	0	60	1
IK Sirius (loan)	2021	Allsvenskan	18	0	0	0	—		18	0
Career total			239	4	29	2	13	0	281	6

== Honours ==
Östersunds FK

- Svenska Cupen: 2016–17

Hammarby IF

- Svenska Cupen: 2020–21
