= Simon Sandberg =

Swedish footballer (born 1994)

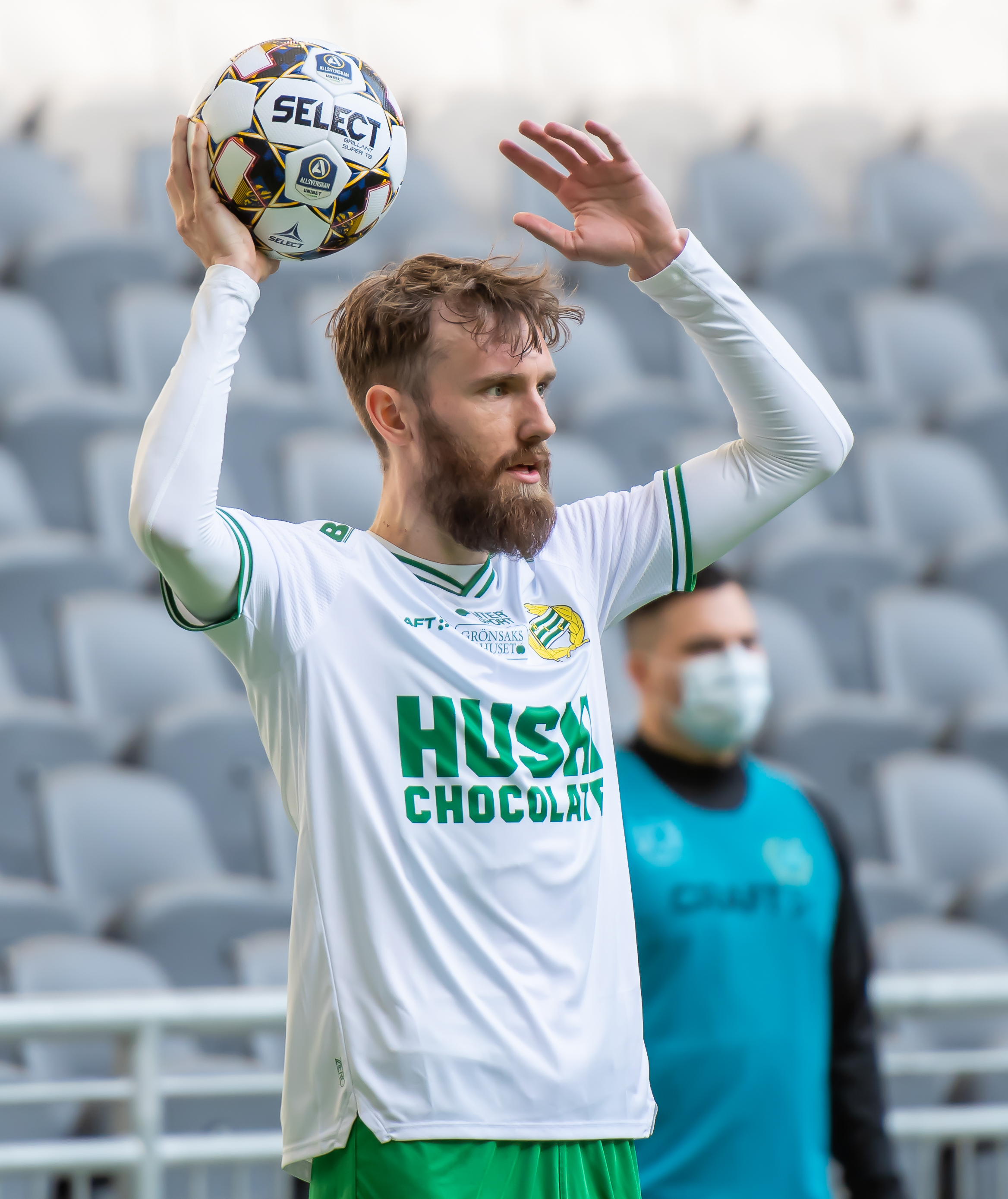
- Sandberg with Hammarby IF in 2021

Personal information
- Full name: Simon Christer Sandberg
- Date of birth: 25 March 1994 (age 32)
- Place of birth: Partille, Sweden
- Height: 1.86 m (6 ft 1 in)
- Position: Right-back

Team information
- Current team: Sirius
- Number: 15

Youth career
- –2009: Björndammens BK
- 2010–2012: BK Häcken

Senior career*
Years	Team	Apps	(Gls)
2013–2016	BK Häcken	61	(1)
2016–2017	Levski Sofia	5	(0)
2018–2022	Hammarby IF	122	(1)
2023–2024	BK Häcken	26	(1)
2024–2025	Lamia	5	(0)
2025–	Sirius	27	(0)

International career^{‡}
2011	Sweden U17	4	(0)
2012–2013	Sweden U19	15	(0)
2015–2016	Sweden U21	5	(0)
2020	Sweden	1	(0)
- * Club domestic league appearances and goals as of 8 July 2026 ‡ National team caps and goals as of 01:18, 16 January 2022 (UTC)

Simon Christer Sandberg (born 25 March 1994) is a Swedish footballer who plays as a right-back for Allsvenskan club Sirius.

== Early life ==
Sandberg grew up in Partille and played both football, with the local club Björndammens BK, and handball during his youth. His father Dennis Sandberg is a professional handball coach. In 2009, at age 15, he was invited to train with Hammarby IF in Allsvenskan, the Swedish top tier, but was not offered a contract. Instead, he signed with BK Häcken the same year and joined their youth academy.

== Club career ==
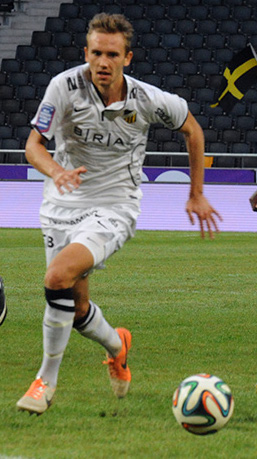
Sandberg playing for BK Häcken in 2014

=== BK Häcken ===
Sandberg signed his first professional contract with BK Häcken in 2012, and made his competitive debut in Allsvenskan on 23 May 2013 in a 3–0 win against Syrianska FC. He soon established himself as a starter at Häcken, playing both as a central defender and full back. Sandberg would move on to make a total of 61 league appearances for Häcken, scoring once, between 2013 and 2016.

Most notably, Sandberg scored the decisive penalty when Häcken won the 2015–16 Svenska Cupen, the club's first ever domestic title, beating Malmö FF in the final after a 2–2 draw (5–6 on penalties).

=== Levski Sofia ===
On 9 July 2016, Sandberg was sold to Levski Sofia in the Bulgarian First League, signing a three-year deal. A transfer fee of around 2 million Swedish kronor (approximately £0,12 million) was suggested, as he only had six months left on his contract with the Swedish club.

Sandberg saw his playing time limited at Levski Sofia, with his stint at the club being plagued by several serious injuries. He also fell out of favour with manager Elin Topuzakov soon after his arrival. Sandberg left the club in November 2017 by mutual consent, after only making five league appearances for Levski Sofia.

=== Hammarby IF ===
On 30 November 2017, ahead of the 2018 Allsvenskan, Sandberg returned to Sweden, signing a two-year contract with Hammarby IF. He made his debut for the club in a 3–1 home win against IK Sirius on 1 April. During the season, Sandberg played 23 league games for Hammarby as the club finished 4th in the table.

On 4 May 2019, Sandberg signed a three-and-a-half-year extension with Hammarby, running until 2022. Throughout the 2019 season, Sandberg played 28 league games and provided seven assists as Hammarby finished 3rd in the table, after eight straight wins at the end of the campaign. After the season, he was nominated as Defender of the Year in Allsvenskan, but eventually lost out on the award.

In 2020, a season postponed due to the COVID-19 pandemic, Sandberg was plagued by a hip injury and only featured in 20 games, as the side disappointedly finished 8th in the table.

On 30 May 2021, Sandberg won the 2020–21 Svenska Cupen with Hammarby through a 5–4 win on penalties (0–0 after full-time) against his former club BK Häcken in the final. Sandberg featured in both legs as the club was knocked out in the play-off round of the 2021–22 UEFA Europa Conference League by Basel (4–4 on aggregate) on penalties, where he scored his attempt. On 7 November 2021, Sandberg scored his first competitive goal for the club in a 3–2 Allsvenskan home win against Örebro SK.

Sandberg featured in the final of the 2021–22 Svenska Cupen, in which Hammarby lost by 4–5 on penalties to Malmö FF after the game ended in a 0–0 draw. On 31 December 2022, Sandberg left Hammarby at the expiration of his contract. In total, he made 122 Allsvenskan appearances for the club.

=== Return to Häcken ===
On 21 February 2023, Sandberg returned to his former club BK Häcken, signing a three-year contract.

=== Lamia ===
On 27 July 2024, Sandberg joined Super League Greece club Lamia.

== International career ==
Sandberg was called up to the Swedish senior squad for the training tour in early 2020. He made his debut in a 1–0 friendly win against Kosovo on 12 January.

== Career statistics ==
=== Club ===
As of 6 November 2022

Appearances and goals by club, season and competition
Club	Season	League			Cup		Continental		Other		Total	
Club	Season	Division	Apps	Goals	Apps	Goals	Apps	Goals	Apps	Goals	Apps	Goals
BK Häcken	2013	Allsvenskan	11	0	0	0	—		—		11	0
BK Häcken	2014	Allsvenskan	15	0	4	1	—		—		19	1
BK Häcken	2015	Allsvenskan	23	0	4	0	—		—		27	0
BK Häcken	2016	Allsvenskan	12	1	2	0	—		—		14	1
BK Häcken	Total		61	1	10	1	0	0	0	0	71	2
Levski Sofia	2016–17	First League	5	0	2	0	—		—		7	0
Levski Sofia	2017–18	First League	0	0	0	0	—		—		0	0
Levski Sofia	Total		5	0	2	0	0	0	0	0	7	0
Hammarby IF	2018	Allsvenskan	23	0	2	0	—		—		25	0
Hammarby IF	2019	Allsvenskan	28	0	4	0	—		—		32	0
Hammarby IF	2020	Allsvenskan	20	0	1	0	0	0	—		21	0
Hammarby IF	2021	Allsvenskan	24	1	5	0	3 (Note: Appearances in UEFA Europa Conference League)	0	—		32	1
Hammarby IF	2022	Allsvenskan	27	0	6	0	—		—		33	0
Hammarby IF	Total		122	1	18	0	3	0	0	0	142	1
Career total			188	2	30	1	3	0	0	0	219	3

== Honours ==
BK Häcken

- Svenska Cupen: 2015–16, 2022–23

Hammarby IF

- Svenska Cupen: 2020–21
