= Gottne IF =

Swedish football club

- Ground: Haraldsängen Fotbollsplan 1 Mellansel, Sweden
- Capacity: 1,029
- Manager: Roger Dannberg
- League: Division 2
- Website: https://www.svenskalag.se/gottneif

Gottne IF is a Swedish football club based in Gottne. The team plays in the Division 2, the four tier league in the country, as of 2022.
