= IF Lödde =

- Full name: Idrottsföreningen Lödde
- Founded: 1942
- Ground: Tolvans IP, Löddeköpinge
- League: Division 2
- 2023: 1st, Division 3

Idrottsföreningen Lödde is a Swedish association football club from Löddeköpinge.

The club was founded in 1942 after the association was able to buy land for a sports field. The sports field was owned by the municipality from 1970, who wanted to convert it into housing. In 2004 the conversion took place as IF Lödde moved to a newly constructed sports field near the Tolvåker School.

The men's football team plays in the Division 2, the fourth tier of Swedish football. The team won promotion from Division 3 in 2023, coached by Daniel Lindgren. When Lödde participated in the 2020–21 Svenska Cupen, there were COVID-19 restrictions on league play, and the restriction on Lödde playing had to be lifted specifically for them to play the cup match.

The women's team plays in Division 3.
