= Karl Björkänge =

Swedish politician (1895–1966)

Karl Björkänge (born Karl Andersson, 31 August 1895, Tumbo – 31 January 1966) was a Swedish politician. He was a member of the Centre Party. He was elected to the Swedish parliament (lower house) in 1949.
