= Henrik Löfkvist =

Swedish footballer

Personal information
- Full name: Karl Henrik Axel Löfkvist Jacobsson
- Date of birth: 5 May 1995 (age 31)
- Place of birth: Sweden
- Height: 1.87 m (6 ft 2 in)
- Position: Defender

Team information
- Current team: Jönköpings Södra
- Number: 2

Senior career*
Years	Team	Apps	(Gls)
2012–2014	Gute	50	(5)
2015	Akropolis	21	(4)
2016–2018	Dalkurd	79	(4)
2019–2021	Kalmar	28	(1)
2022–	Jönköpings Södra	1	(0)
- * Club domestic league appearances and goals as of 19:07, 20 May 2019 (UTC)

Karl Henrik Axel Löfkvist Jacobsson (born 5 May 1995) is a Swedish professional footballer who plays for Jönköpings Södra, as a defender.

== Club career ==
On 17 January 2022, Löfkvist signed a two-year contract with Jönköpings Södra.
