= Ekedalen =

- Location within Västra Götaland Location within Sweden
- Coordinates: 58°12′N 13°50′E
- Country: Sweden
- Province: Västergötland
- County: Västra Götaland County
- Municipality: Tidaholm Municipality

Area
  - Total: 0.54 km^{2} (0.21 sq mi)

Population (31 December 2010)
  - Total: 404
  - Density: 751/km^{2} (1,950/sq mi)
- Time zone: UTC+1 (CET)
  - Summer (DST): UTC+2 (CEST)
- Climate: Dfb

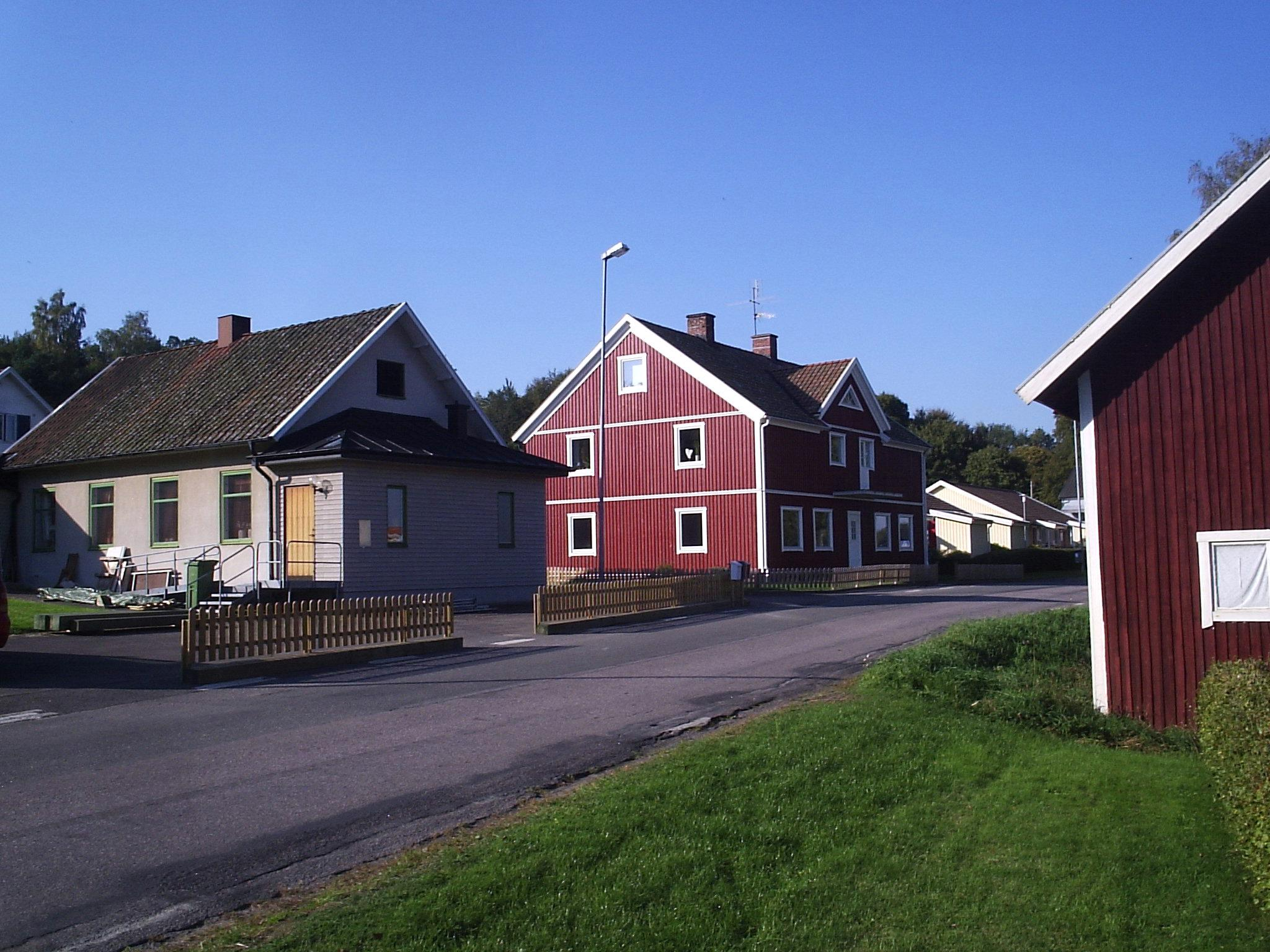
Ekedalen, Tidaholm municipality, September 2006

Ekedalen is a locality situated in Tidaholm Municipality, Västra Götaland County, Sweden with 483 inhabitants in 2020.
