= Karl Andersson i Eliantorp =

Swedish politician

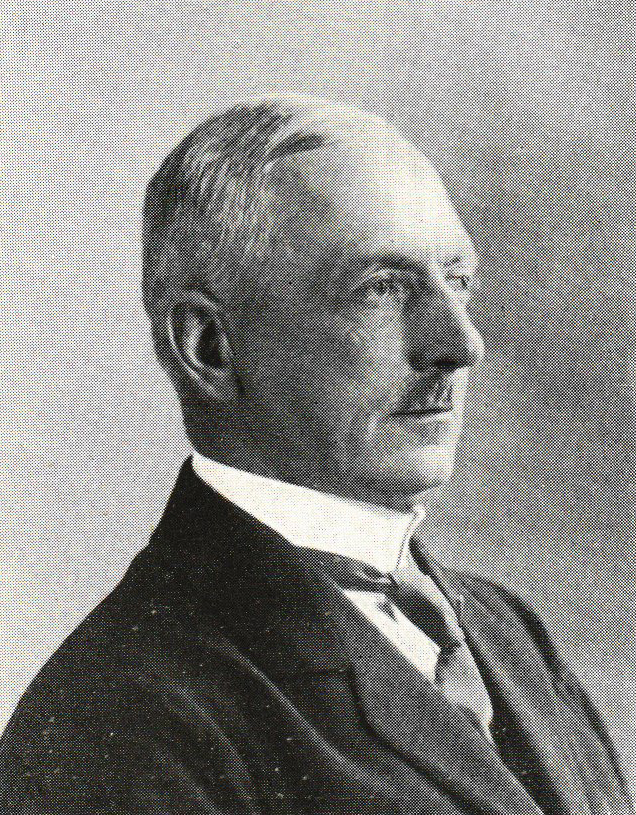

Karl Andersson i Eliantorp (10 August 1869 – 29 October 1959) was a Swedish politician and member of the Riksdag. He was a member of the Farmers' League.
