= Mads Fenger =

Danish football defender (born 1990)

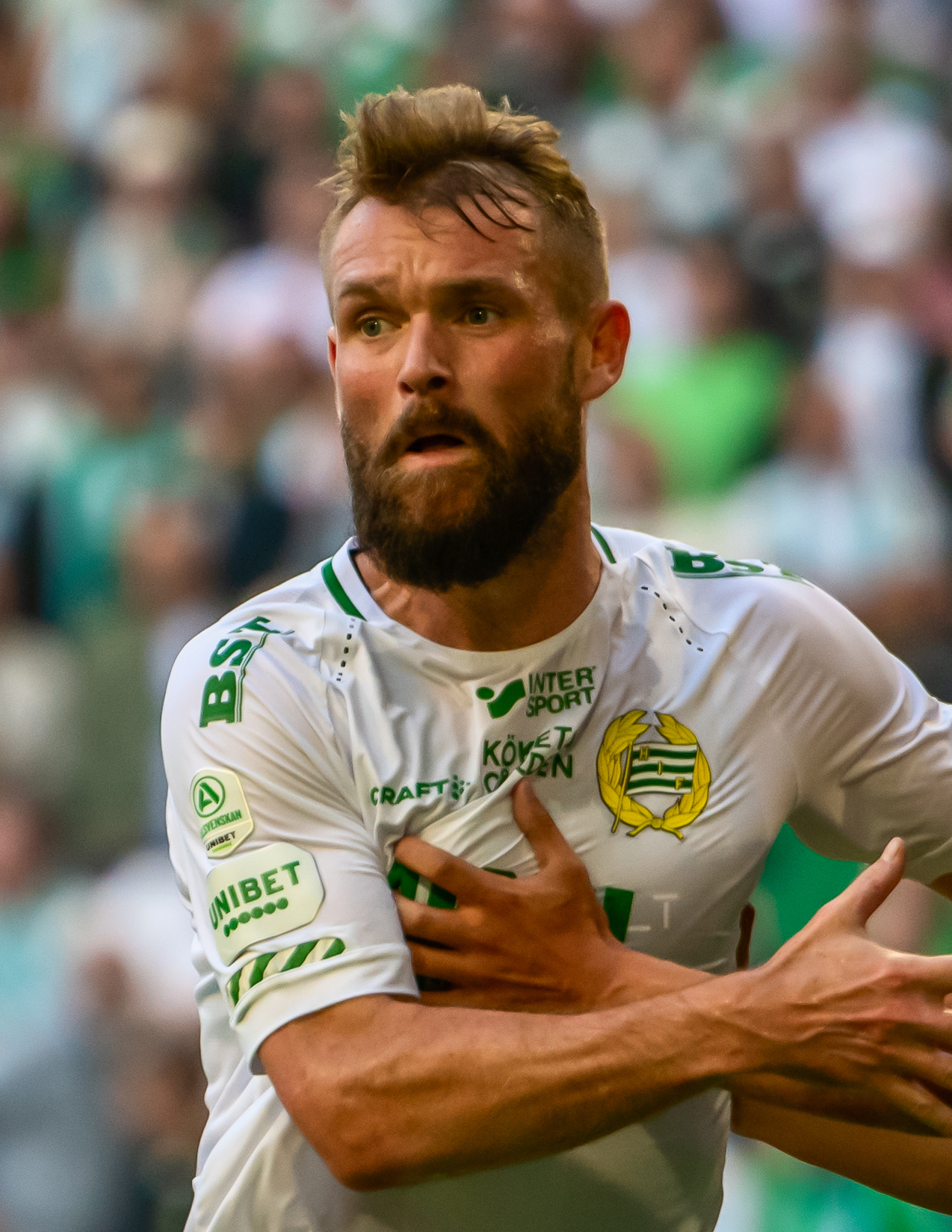
- Fenger with Hammarby in 2022

Personal information
- Full name: Mads Fenger Nielsen
- Date of birth: 10 September 1990 (age 36)
- Place of birth: Aarhus, Denmark
- Height: 1.85 m (6 ft 1 in)
- Position: Centre-back

Team information
- Current team: Horsens
- Number: 13

Youth career
- –2006: Skovbakken
- 2007–2009: Randers Freja

Senior career*
Years	Team	Apps	(Gls)
2009–2017	Randers	223	(3)
2017–2024	Hammarby IF	171	(6)
2025–	Horsens	2	(0)

International career
2009	Denmark U19	5	(0)
2011	Denmark U20	1	(0)
2009–2012	Denmark U21	15	(0)
- * Club domestic league appearances and goals as of 29 May 2025

Mads Fenger Nielsen (born 10 September 1990) is a Danish professional footballer who plays as a centre-back for AC Horsens.

Fenger holds the record for most first team appearances in the history of Randers FC.

== Early life ==
Mads Fenger grew up in Aarhus, Jutland and started his football career at local club IK Skovbakken. In 2007, he joined Randers FC youth academy but soon started to play senior football with their reserve team Randers Freja.

== Club career ==
=== Randers FC ===
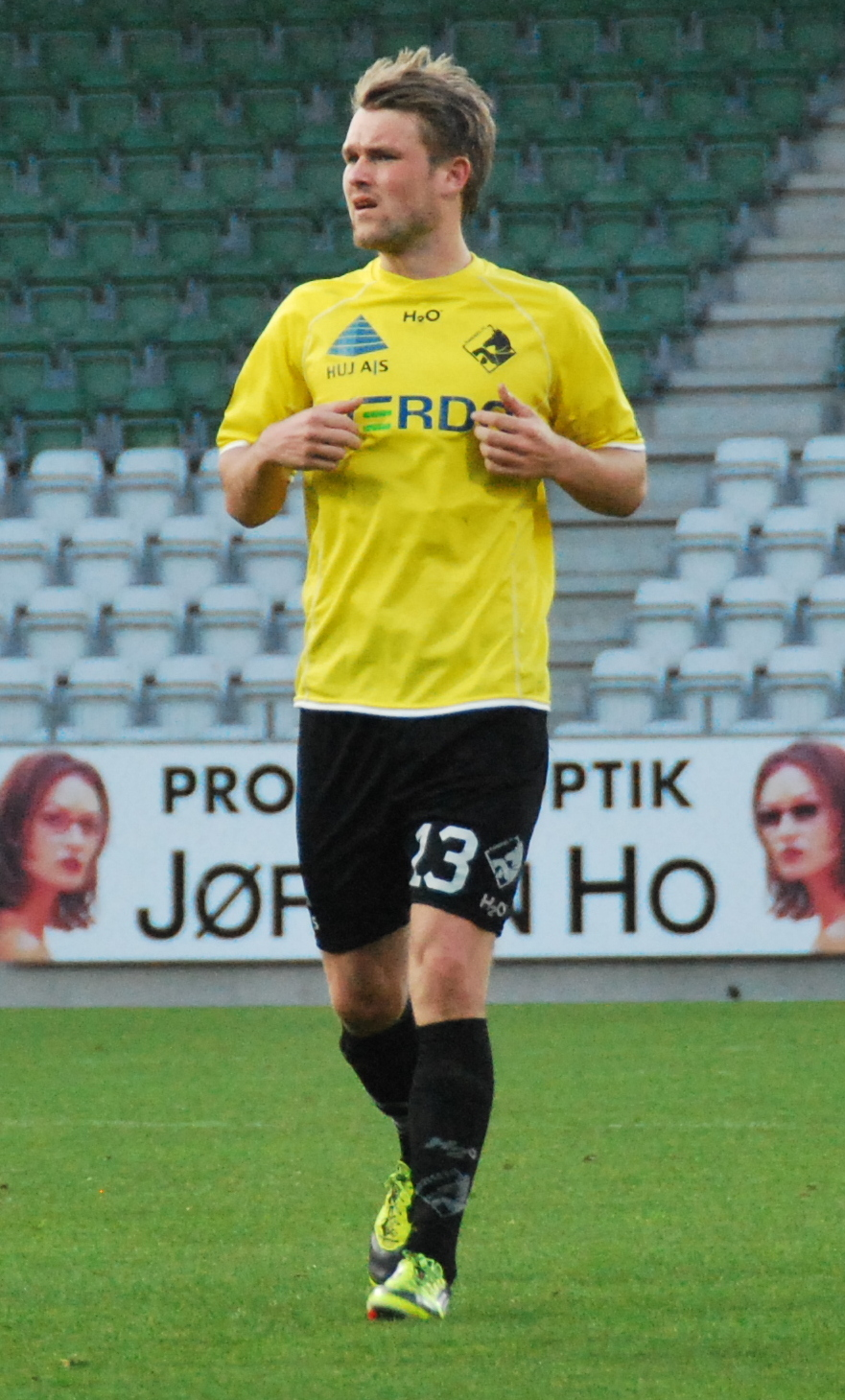
Fenger with Randers FC in 2012

Fenger made his competitive debut for Randers in the 2008–09 season, making three appearances.

During the 2009–10 season, Fenger formed a strong central-defence with Anders Egholm as part of a Randers-team that miraculously avoided relegation after being 13 points under the relegation-line halfway through the season. Fenger and Randers ultimately ended up 10th and avoided relegation, in a season that has since been described as the most dramatic in the history of the club.

The upcoming 2010–11 season, Fenger played 16 league games as Randers had a hard time following up on their results from the previous season. Ultimately the club finished 11th, thus facing relegation to the Danish 1st Division.

Staying with the club despite the relegation, Fenger, once again, played a vital part in a team that secured a second place in the Danish 1st Division and thereby earned a promotion to the Danish Superliga in the 2011–12 season. Fenger played a total of 25 league games throughout the campaign.

In the 2012–13 season, Fenger was a key player in the central defence, playing a total of 32 league games. The season ended with Randers securing a third place – the best league result in the history of the club. Fenger also helped the club to reach the final of the Danish Cup, where the team lost 0–1 to Esbjerg FB.

Following several strong seasons, Fenger was promoted to vice-captain of Randers during the 2014–15 season, marking his growing influence in the squad. Fenger played a total of 32 out of 33 league games, as Randers finished 4th in the league.

On August 16, 2015, in a match against OB, Fenger made his 200th appearance the club, becoming only the second player in the club's history to reach this milestone.

In March 2016, Fenger was promoted to captain at Randers.

He left the club at the end of the 2016–17 season. Fenger holds the record for most first team appearances in the history of said club, 262 across all competitions.

=== Hammarby IF ===
==== 2017 ====
On 17 February 2017, Fenger agreed to join the Swedish Allsvenskan club Hammarby IF on a pre-contract. The three-year deal came to effect on 15 July the same year, at the start of the summer transfer window. Fenger made his competitive debut for the side on 17 July, playing the whole game in 3–0 loss against Elfsborg. He quickly established himself as an important member in manager Jakob Michelsen's side, usually pairing up with compatriot Bjørn Paulsen in the central defence. After making ten appearances for Hammarby, Fenger was ruled out for the remainder of the season following a serious groin injury, which he attracted in a 2–1 win against IFK Göteborg on 20 September. Fenger went under the knife in October, with an expected return in early 2018.

==== 2018 ====
In 2018, Fenger played 18 league games as the club finished 4th in the table. On 7 October, Fenger scored his first goal for Hammarby, from a spectacular free kick, in a 4–2 away win against Brommapojkarna.

==== 2019 ====
In 2019, Fenger made 23 appearances in the league. Hammarby finished 3rd in the Allsvenskan table after eight straight wins at the end of the season. On 24 December the same year, Fenger signed a new four-year contract with the club lasting until the end of 2023.

==== 2020 ====
In 2020, a season postponed due to the COVID-19 pandemic, Fenger continued as a regular starter and played 28 league games, although the side disappointedly finished 8th in the Allsvenskan table. He featured in the first round of the 2020–21 UEFA Europa League against Puskás Akadémia (in a 3–0 win), before the club was eliminated from the tournament in the second round against Lech Poznań (in a 0–3 loss).

==== 2021 ====
On 30 May 2021, Fenger won the 2020–21 Svenska Cupen, the main domestic cup, with Hammarby through a 5–4 win on penalties (0–0 after full-time) against BK Häcken in the final, where he scored his attempt. He featured in all six games as the side reached the play-off round of the 2021–22 UEFA Europa Conference League, after eliminating Maribor (4–1 on aggregate) and FK Čukarički (6–4 on aggregate), where the club was knocked out by Basel (4–4 on aggregate) after a penalty shoot-out, in which Fenger scored his attempt.

On 23 September 2021, in a 3–0 home win against IFK Göteborg, Fenger made his 100th league appearance for Hammarby. He ended the 2021 season making 29 league appearances for Hammarby, that finished 5th in Allsvenskan.

==== 2022 ====
Fenger featured in the final of the 2021–22 Svenska Cupen, in which Hammarby lost by 4–5 on penalties to Malmö FF after the game ended in a 0–0 draw. In the league, Fenger made 26 appearances, scoring once, helping his side to finish 3rd in the 2022 Allsvenskan table.

==== 2023 ====
On 2 April 2023, he was appointed as the new vice-captain of the club, behind Nahir Besara. At the end of the season, on 3 November 2023, Fenger signed a new two-year contract with Hammarby. Throughout the campaign, Fenger made 23 league appearances in Allsvenskan, although Hammarby disappointedly finished 7th in the table.

=== AC Horsens ===
On 13 December 2024, AC Horsens announced the signing of Fenger, starting from 1st January 2025.

== Career statistics ==
=== Club ===
As of 31 March 2024

Appearances and goals by club, season and competition
Club	Season	League			Cup		Continental		Total	
Club	Season	Division	Apps	Goals	Apps	Goals	Apps	Goals	Apps	Goals
Randers FC	2008–09	Danish Superliga	3	0	0	0	—		3	0
Randers FC	2009–10	Danish Superliga	25	0	1	0	6 (Note: Appearances in UEFA Europa League)	0	32	0
Randers FC	2010–11	Danish Superliga	16	0	2	0	5	0	23	0
Randers FC	2011–12	Danish 1st Division	25	1	1	0	—		26	1
Randers FC	2012–13	Danish Superliga	32	0	6	0	—		38	0
Randers FC	2013–14	Danish Superliga	29	2	1	0	2	0	32	1
Randers FC	2014–15	Danish Superliga	32	0	4	1	—		36	1
Randers FC	2015–16	Danish Superliga	32	0	2	0	4	0	38	0
Randers FC	2016–17	Danish Superliga	29	0	3	0	—		32	0
Randers FC	Total		223	3	20	1	17	0	260	4
Hammarby IF	2017	Allsvenskan	10	0	1	0	—		11	0
Hammarby IF	2018	Allsvenskan	19	2	0	0	—		19	2
Hammarby IF	2019	Allsvenskan	23	1	4	2	—		27	3
Hammarby IF	2020	Allsvenskan	28	1	3	0	2	0	33	1
Hammarby IF	2021	Allsvenskan	29	1	7	1	6 (Note: Appearances in UEFA Europa Conference League)	0	42	2
Hammarby IF	2022	Allsvenskan	26	1	7	1	—		33	2
Hammarby IF	2023	Allsvenskan	23	0	4	0	2	0	29	0
Hammarby IF	2024	Allsvenskan	1	0	2	0	—		3	0
Hammarby IF	Total		159	6	28	4	10	0	197	10
Career total			381	9	48	5	27	0	456	14

== Honours ==
Hammarby IF

- Svenska Cupen: 2020–21
