= Carl-Oscar Andersson =

Swedish footballer

Personal information
- Full name: Carl-Oscar Tore; Kent Andersson
- Date of birth: 2 April 1992 (age 34)
- Place of birth: Varberg, Sweden
- Height: 1.86 m (6 ft 1 in)
- Position: Midfielder

Team information
- Current team: Knattspyrnufélag Fjarðabyggðar

Youth career
- –2001: Skrea IF
- 2002–2007: GAIS
- 2008–2010: Falkenbergs FF

Senior career*
Years	Team	Apps	(Gls)
2011	Falkenbergs FF	2	(0)
2011–2012	Mercer Bears	36	(4)
2013–2014	Falkenbergs FF	25	(3)
2015–2015	New York Cosmos B	7	(1)
2015–	Knattspyrnufélag Fjarðabyggðar	1	(0)
- * Club domestic league appearances and goals as of 31 January 2015

Carl-Oscar Andersson (born 2 April 1992), sometimes spelled Carl-Oskar Andersson, is a Swedish footballer who plays for Knattspyrnufélag Fjarðabyggðar as a midfielder. He is son of the comedian Annika Andersson and the GAIS chairman Tomas Andersson.
