= Gottne =

- Location within Västernorrland Location within Sweden Location within European Union
- Coordinates: 63°26′N 18°26′E
- Federation: European Union
- State: Sweden
- County: Västernorrland County
- Municipality: Örnsköldsvik Municipality

Area
  - Total: 0.55 km^{2} (0.21 sq mi)

Population (31 December 2015)
  - Total: 212
  - Density: 380/km^{2} (980/sq mi)
- Time zone: UTC+1 (CET)
  - Summer (DST): UTC+2 (CEST)

Gottne is a locality situated in Örnsköldsvik Municipality, Västernorrland County, Sweden. It had 218 inhabitants in 2010.

== History ==
Gottne has very old origins; among other things, arrowheads of flint have been found that probably dates back to the Neolithic Times (about 3,000 years before Christ).

== Transportation ==
A few kilometers west of Gottne, there was a railway station along the Main Line Through Upper Norrland, Gottne Station, where a settlement grew. However, this expansion was discontinued when the station was closed down in 1963. The area around the former station is now known as Västra Gottne.

== Population ==
In recent years, Gottne has become a Population declining area (Swedish: Avfolkningsbygd).

Historical population in 5-year intervals, 1980–Present
Year	Pop.	±%
1980	204	—
1990	267	+30.9%
1995	232	−13.1%
2000	240	+3.4%
2005	226	−5.8%
2010	218	−3.5%
2015	212	−2.8%
source		—

== Gallery ==
Town

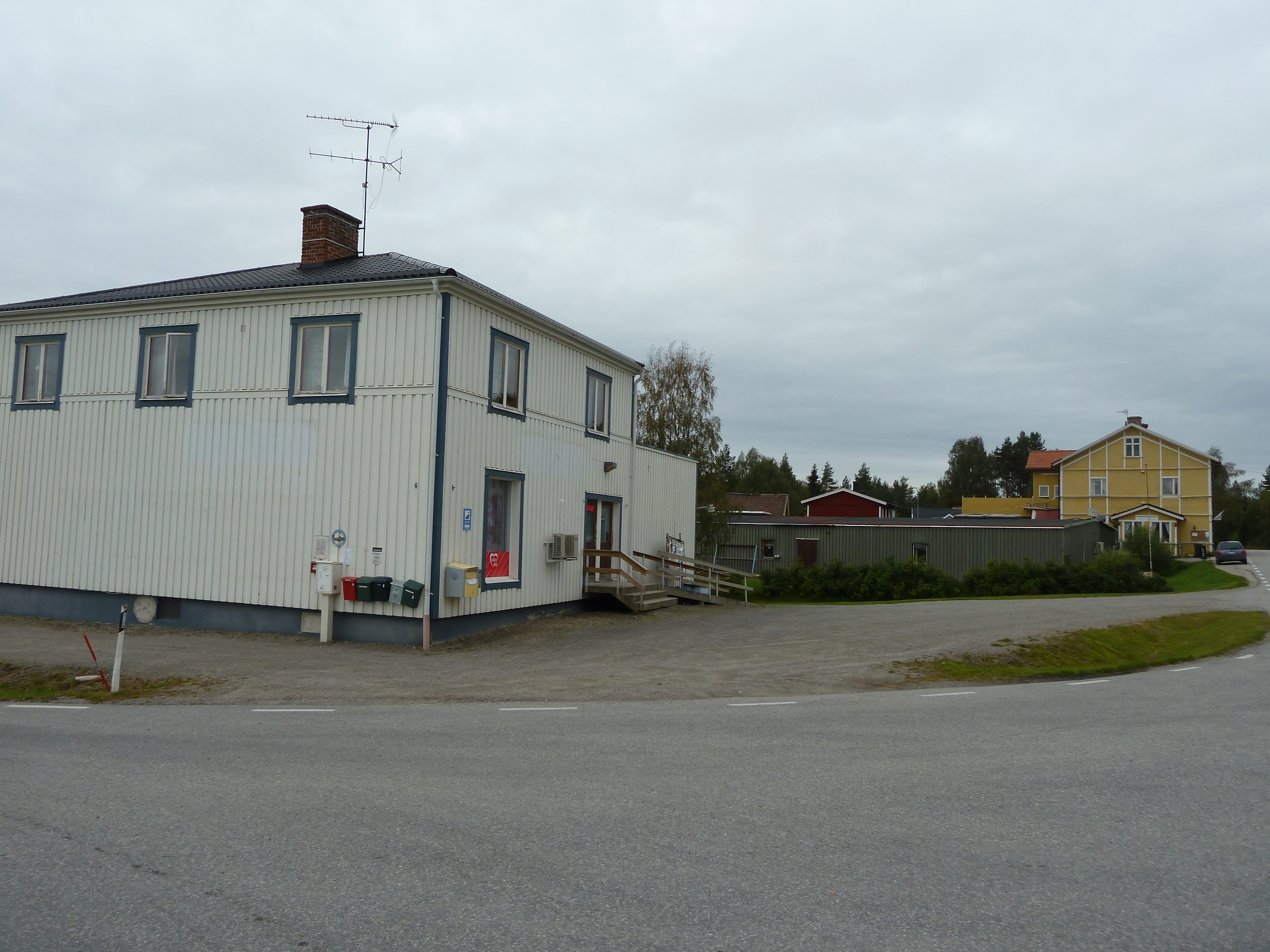

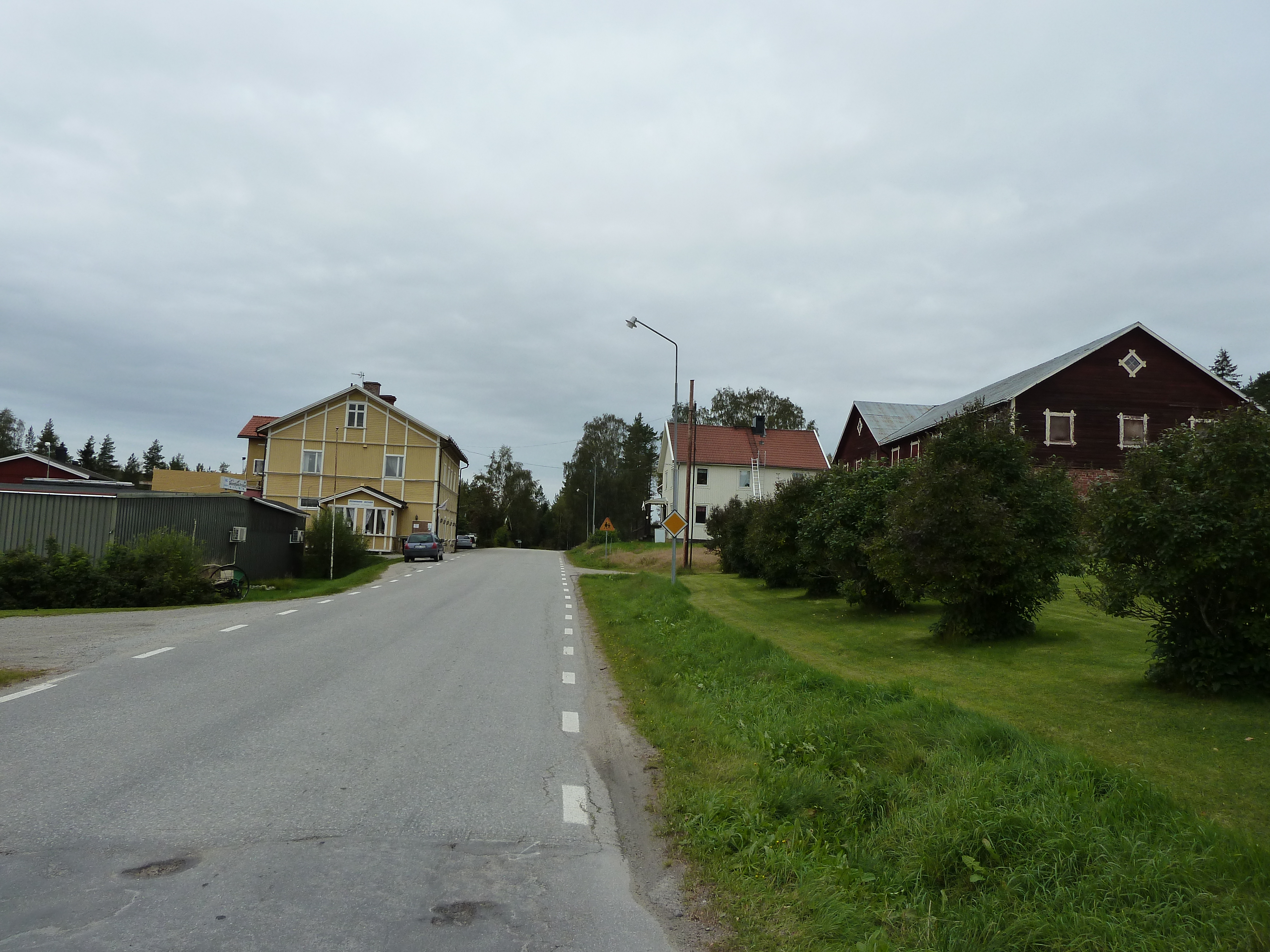
