= Noor Zadran =

Afghan footballer (born 1994)

Personal information
- Date of birth: 23 August 1994 (age 32)
- Place of birth: Khost, Afghanistan
- Height: 1.87 m (6 ft 1 1/2 in)
- Position: Striker

Team information
- Current team: Torns IF
- Number: 21

Senior career*
Years	Team	Apps	(Gls)
2011–2015	Kvarnby IK		
2016	FC Rosengård 1917	21	(1)
2017–2019	IFK Malmö	51	(41)
2018	→ Landskrona BoIS (loan)	6	(0)
2020–	Torns IF	20	(3)

International career^{‡}
2016–	Afghanistan	4	(0)
- * Club domestic league appearances and goals as of 20:35, 30 September 2020 (UTC) ‡ National team caps and goals as of 19:30, 8 January 2019 (UTC)

Noor Zadran (born 23 August 1994) is an Afghan international footballer who plays as a striker for Torns IF.

== Career ==
On 27 November 2019, it was confirmed that Zadran would join Torns IF for the 2020 season.
