= List of Swedish football transfers winter 2019–20 =

This is a list of Swedish football transfers in the 2019–2020 winter transfer window by club. Only clubs of the 2020 Allsvenskan are included.

== Allsvenskan ==
=== AIK ===
In: Note: Flags indicate national team as defined under FIFA eligibility rules; some limited exceptions apply. Players may hold more than one non-FIFA nationality.

No.	Pos.	Nation	Player
11		SWE	Stefan Silva (loan return from (Turkey) Fatih Karagümrük)
14		SWE	Paulos Abraham (from Brommapojkarna)
17		GHA	Ebenezer Ofori (from (Germany) VfB Stuttgart)
21		ALB	Jasir Asani (on loan from (Albania) Partizani)
25		KEN	Eric Ouma (from Vasalund)
28		SWE	Adam Ben Lamin (loan return from Utsikten)
29		SWE	Eric Kahl (promoted from junior squad)
31		DEN	Jakob Haugaard (free transfer)
32		SWE	Tom Strannegård (promoted from junior squad)

Out: Note: Flags indicate national team as defined under FIFA eligibility rules; some limited exceptions apply. Players may hold more than one non-FIFA nationality.

No.	Pos.	Nation	Player
5		SWE	Jesper Nyholm (to Djurgården)
10		NGA	Chinedu Obasi (released)
16		SWE	Anton Salétros (loan return to (Russia) Rostov)
20		NOR	Tarik Elyounoussi (to (Japan) Shonan Bellmare)
26		SWE	Joel Ekstrand (retired)
31		SWE	Christos Gravius (to Degerfors, previously on loan)
34		SWE	Oscar Linnér (to (Germany) Arminia Bielefeld)
—		ARG	Nicolás Stefanelli (to (Chile) Unión La Calera, previously on loan)
—		SWE	Daniel Mushitu (on loan to Karlstad, previously on loan at Vasalund)
—	GK	SWE	Samuel Brolin (on loan to Akropolis, previously on loan at Vasalund)

=== Djurgården ===
In: Note: Flags indicate national team as defined under FIFA eligibility rules; some limited exceptions apply. Players may hold more than one non-FIFA nationality.

No.	Pos.	Nation	Player
17		SWE	Kalle Holmberg (from Norrköping)
22		ZAM	Emmanuel Banda (from (Belgium) Oostende)
26		SWE	Linus Tagesson (promoted from junior squad)
35		NOR	Erland Tangvik (from (Norway) Tiller)

Out: Note: Flags indicate national team as defined under FIFA eligibility rules; some limited exceptions apply. Players may hold more than one non-FIFA nationality.

No.	Pos.	Nation	Player
3		SWE	Marcus Danielson (to (China) Dalian)
17		SWE	Hampus Finndell (on loan to Dalkurd)
22		SWE	Adam Bergmark Wiberg (on loan to Örgryte)
35	GK	SWE	Jacob Widell Zetterström (released?, previously on loan at Lidingö)
77	FW	SLE	Mohamed Buya Turay (loan return to (Belgium) Sint-Truiden)
—		SWE	Joseph Ceesay (to Helsingborg, previously on loan at Dalkurd)
—		SWE	Marcus Hansson (released, previously on loan at Brommapojkarna)
—		SWE	Besard Šabović (to Mjällby, previously on loan at Dalkurd)
—		SWE	Johan Andersson (on loan to GIF Sundsvall, previously on loan at Karlstad)
—		SWE	Dzenis Kozica (to Jönköpings Södra, previously on loan at Eskilstuna)
—	GK	USA	Benjamin Machini (to Hammarby)

=== Elfsborg ===
In: Note: Flags indicate national team as defined under FIFA eligibility rules; some limited exceptions apply. Players may hold more than one non-FIFA nationality.

No.	Pos.	Nation	Player
1	GK	NOR	Mathias Dyngeland (from (Norway) Sogndal)
4		SWE	Christopher McVey (loan return from Dalkurd)
12		SWE	Alexander Bernhardsson (from Örgryte)
14		SWE	Jacob Ondrejka (from Landskrona)
15		FIN	Leo Väisänen (from (Netherlands) Den Bosch)
19		SWE	Tim Stålheden (promoted from junior squad)
23		SWE	Prince Isaac Kouame (promoted from junior squad)
22		SWE	Rasmus Rosenqvist (loan return from GAIS)
24		SWE	Johan Larsson (from (Denmark) Brøndby)
25		SWE	Eduart Iljazi (promoted from junior squad)
28		SWE	Jesper Sandberg-Hesselgren (promoted from junior squad)
29		SWE	Anton Thorsson (promoted from junior squad)

Out: Note: Flags indicate national team as defined under FIFA eligibility rules; some limited exceptions apply. Players may hold more than one non-FIFA nationality.

No.	Pos.	Nation	Player
1	GK	DEN	Kevin Stuhr Ellegaard (to (Denmark) Helsingør)
3	DF	NOR	Stian Rode Gregersen (loan return to (Norway) Molde)
6	DF	SWE	Jon Jönsson (retired)
10		SWE	Simon Lundevall (to (India) NorthEast United)
12		ESP	Álex Portillo (to (Spain) Antequera)
21		SWE	Jonathan Levi (loan return to (Norway) Rosenborg)
23		MSR	Alex Dyer (to (Kuwait) Al Tadhamon)
24		SWE	Stefan Ishizaki (retired)
25		SWE	Arian Kabashi (on loan to Dalkurd, previously on loan at GAIS)
—	GK	SWE	David Olsson (on loan to Örgryte, previously on loan at Oddevold)
—		SWE	Mattias Özgun (on loan to Akropolis, previously on loan at Degerfors)

=== Falkenberg ===
In: Note: Flags indicate national team as defined under FIFA eligibility rules; some limited exceptions apply. Players may hold more than one non-FIFA nationality.

No.	Pos.	Nation	Player
2		SWE	Gabriel Johansson (promoted from junior squad)
3		GHA	Kwame Kizito (from Häcken)
5		SWE	Mohammad Ahmadi (promoted from junior squad)
14		NZL	Matthew Garbett (from (New Zealand) Team Wellington)
15		SWE	Rasmus Fridolf (promoted from junior squad)
16	GK	SWE	Tim Erlandsson (from Frej)
20		NED	Sander van Looy (free transfer)
23		SWE	Lorik Ademi (promoted from junior squad)
31	GK	SWE	Viktor Noring (from Kalmar)
—	MF	SWE	Carl Martinsson (promoted from junior squad)

Out: Note: Flags indicate national team as defined under FIFA eligibility rules; some limited exceptions apply. Players may hold more than one non-FIFA nationality.

No.	Pos.	Nation	Player
2		SWE	Ludvig Johansson (released)
3		SWE	Hampus Svensson (released)
6		SWE	Johan Lassagård (to Värnamo, previously on loan)
11		SWE	Robin Östlind (to Halmstad)
14		SWE	Per Karlsson (to Tvååker)
15		RUS	Kirill Pogrebnyak (to (Uzbekistan) Lokomotiv Tashkent)
16		SWE	Hampus Nilsson (to Trelleborg)
16	GK	SWE	Dennis Bengtsson (released)
19		SWE	Mergim Laci (to Tvååker)
28		NGA	Dominic Chatto (retired)
45		SWE	Passi Prudence (to Landskrona, previously on loan at Eskilsminne)
—		SWE	Denis Kelmendi (released, previously on loan at Stafsinge)
—		SWE	Carl Martinsson (on loan to Tvååker)

=== Hammarby ===
In: Note: Flags indicate national team as defined under FIFA eligibility rules; some limited exceptions apply. Players may hold more than one non-FIFA nationality.

No.	Pos.	Nation	Player
1	GK	DEN	David Ousted (from (United States) Chicago Fire)
9	FW	BRA	Paulinho (from (Israel) Hapoel Be'er Sheva)
16	FW	SWE	Gustav Ludwigson (from Örgryte)
17		SWE	Abdul Khalili (from (Turkey) Kasimpasa)
24	GK	SWE	Oliver Nnonyelu Dovin (promoted from junior squad)
28		BRA	Jean (loan return from Frej)
31		SWE	Aimar Sher (promoted from junior squad)
—		CIV	Loue Bayere Junior (from (Ivory Coast) ASEC Mimosas, previously on loan)
—		CIV	Aziz Outtara Mohammed (from (Ivory Coast) ASEC Mimosas, previously on loan)

Out: Note: Flags indicate national team as defined under FIFA eligibility rules; some limited exceptions apply. Players may hold more than one non-FIFA nationality.

No.	Pos.	Nation	Player
1	GK	SWE	Johan Wiland (retired)
15		SWE	Hjalmar Ekdal (on loan to Sirius, previously on loan at Frej)
16		SWE	Leo Bengtsson (to Häcken, previously on loan at Frej)
23		SWE	Marcus Degerlund (to Jönköpings Södra, previously on loan at Frej)
24	GK	SWE	Oliver Nnonyelu Dovin (on loan to Frej)
26		SWE	Kalle Björklund (on loan to Frej)
31		SWE	Aimar Sher (on loan to Frej)
40	FW	SRB	Nikola Đurđić (to (China) Chengdu Better City)
77	DF	NOR	Mats Solheim (to (Norway) Stabæk)
—	FW	BRA	Zé Vitor (to (Brazil) Tubarão, previously on loan at Frej)
—		CIV	Loue Bayere Junior (on loan to Frej)
—		CIV	Aziz Outtara Mohammed (on loan to Frej)

=== Helsingborg ===
In: Note: Flags indicate national team as defined under FIFA eligibility rules; some limited exceptions apply. Players may hold more than one non-FIFA nationality.

No.	Pos.	Nation	Player
2		FRA	Ravy Tsouka (from Västerås)
3		MKD	Egzon Bejtulai (from (North Macedonia) Shkëndija)
5		FRO	Brandur Hendriksson (from (Iceland) FH Hafnarfjördur)
10		SWE	Rasmus Jönsson (from (Thailand) Buriram United)
13		SWE	Martin Olsson (free transfer)
16		SWE	Erik Figueroa (from (Argentina) Unión La Calera)
18		SWE	Alexander Nilsson (from Hässleholm)
19		SWE	Joseph Ceesay (from Djurgården)
20		SWE	Assad Al Hamlawi (from Ängelholm)
23		ENG	Noel Mbo (loan return from Eskilsminne)
26		SWE	Jakob Voelkerling-Persson (promoted from junior squad)
33		SWE	Alex Timossi Andersson (on loan from (Germany) Bayern U19)
39		NED	Anthony van den Hurk (from (Netherlands) MVV)

Out: Note: Flags indicate national team as defined under FIFA eligibility rules; some limited exceptions apply. Players may hold more than one non-FIFA nationality.

No.	Pos.	Nation	Player
3		SWE	Fredrik Liverstam (to Trelleborg)
8		GHA	Mamudo Moro (to Mjällby)
10		SWE	Alexander Farnerud (to IFK Göteborg)
16		RSA	Tashreeq Matthews (loan return to (Germany) Borussia Dortmund II)
19		DEN	Tobias Mikkelsen (retired)
20		BRA	Wánderson (released)
21		SWE	Charlie Weberg (on loan to GAIS)
22		ISL	Daníel Hafsteinsson (on loan to (Iceland) FH Hafnarfjördur)
26		ENG	Kundai Benyu (loan return to (Scotland) Celtic)
33		BFA	Ibrahim Bancé (loan return to (Ivory Coast) ASEC Mimosas)
57		SWE	Markus Holgersson (retired)
—		SWE	Mattias Almeida (released, previously on loan at Värnamo)

=== Häcken ===
In: Note: Flags indicate national team as defined under FIFA eligibility rules; some limited exceptions apply. Players may hold more than one non-FIFA nationality.

No.	Pos.	Nation	Player
10		FIN	Jasse Tuominen (from (Belarus) BATE Borisov)
15		NOR	Alexander Søderlund (from (Norway) Rosenborg)
16		SWE	Leo Bengtsson (from Hammarby)
22		SWE	Tobias Carlsson (from Varberg)
23		SWE	Patrik Wålemark (from Qviding)
27		SWE	Adnan Marić (from (England) Swansea U23)
99		SWE	Imam Jagne (promoted from junior squad)

Out: Note: Flags indicate national team as defined under FIFA eligibility rules; some limited exceptions apply. Players may hold more than one non-FIFA nationality.

No.	Pos.	Nation	Player
4		FIN	Juhani Ojala (to (Denmark) Vejle)
10		BRA	Paulinho (to (Israel) Hapoel Be'er Sheva)
15		FIN	Kari Arkivuo (to (Finland) Lahti)
16		GHA	Kwame Kizito (to Falkenberg)
24		SWE	Kevin Ackermann (to Örgryte)
—		SWE	Benjamin Arapovic (to Norrby)
—		SWE	Teodor Wålemark (to Ljungskile)

=== IFK Göteborg ===
In: Note: Flags indicate national team as defined under FIFA eligibility rules; some limited exceptions apply. Players may hold more than one non-FIFA nationality.

No.	Pos.	Nation	Player
5		SWE	Alexander Jallow (from Jönköpings Södra)
11		SWE	Amin Affane (loan return from Örgryte)
15		SWE	Jakob Johansson (from (France) Rennes)
17		SWE	Alexander Farnerud (from Helsingborg)

Out: Note: Flags indicate national team as defined under FIFA eligibility rules; some limited exceptions apply. Players may hold more than one non-FIFA nationality.

No.	Pos.	Nation	Player
7		SWE	Sebastian Eriksson (to (Italy) Genoa)
17		SWE	Edvin Dahlqvist (to Qviding, previously on loan at Utsikten)
29		DEN	Lasse Vibe (to (Denmark) Midtjylland)
—		SWE	Erik Gunnarsson (to Utsikten, previously on loan)
—		SWE	Andreas Öhman (to Utsikten, previously on loan)
—		SWE	Jake Weisbrod (to Assyriska, previously on loan at Oddevold)

=== Kalmar ===
In: Note: Flags indicate national team as defined under FIFA eligibility rules; some limited exceptions apply. Players may hold more than one non-FIFA nationality.

No.	Pos.	Nation	Player
3		SWE	Sebastian Ring (from (England) Grimsby)
11		SWE	Svante Ingelsson (on loan from (Italy) Udinese)
18		SWE	Johan Arvidsson (promoted from junior squad)
30	GK	SWE	Tobias Andersson (from Öster)
37		SWE	Edvin Crona (loan return from Värnamo)
—		SWE	Viktor Krüger (promoted from junior squad)
—		SWE	Malte Persson (promoted from junior squad)

Out: Note: Flags indicate national team as defined under FIFA eligibility rules; some limited exceptions apply. Players may hold more than one non-FIFA nationality.

No.	Pos.	Nation	Player
1	GK	SWE	Viktor Noring (to Falkenberg)
3		SWE	Samuel Adrian (loan return to Malmö)
5		SWE	Viktor Agardius (to (Italy) Livorno)
6		SWE	Rasmus Elm (retired)
9		SWE	Måns Söderqvist (to Trelleborg)
12		SWE	Jesper Manns (to Eskilstuna)
14		NGA	Chidiebere Nwakali (released)
18		PLE	Mahmoud Eid (released)
21	GK	SWE	Hampus Strömgren (released)
34		SWE	Herman Hallberg (to Trelleborg)
38		SWE	Adam Hellborg (to Sirius, previously on loan at Oskarshamn)
70		EGY	Alexander Jakobsen (loan return to Norrköping)
95		BRA	Maxwell (on loan to (Brazil) Cuiabá)
—		SWE	Viktor Krüger (on loan to Oskarshamn)
—		SWE	Malte Persson (on loan to Oskarshamn)

=== Malmö ===
In: Note: Flags indicate national team as defined under FIFA eligibility rules; some limited exceptions apply. Players may hold more than one non-FIFA nationality.

No.	Pos.	Nation	Player
7		SWE	Isaac Kiese Thelin (on loan from (Belgium) Anderlecht)
15		SWE	Anel Ahmedhodžić (loan return from (Denmark) Hobro)
22		SWE	Adi Nalić (loan return from Eskilstuna)
34		SWE	Pavle Vagić (loan return from Eskilstuna)
35		SWE	Samuel Adrian (loan return from Kalmar)
36		KOS	Patriot Sejdiu (promoted from junior squad)
38		SWE	Linus Borgström (promoted from junior squad)
39		SWE	Amin Sarr (promoted from junior squad)
40		SWE	Hugo Andersson (loan return from Trelleborg)

Out: Note: Flags indicate national team as defined under FIFA eligibility rules; some limited exceptions apply. Players may hold more than one non-FIFA nationality.

No.	Pos.	Nation	Player
9		SWE	Markus Rosenberg (retired)
16		SWE	Felix Beijmo (loan return to (Germany) Werder Bremen)
18		USA	Romain Gall (on loan to (Norway) Stabæk)
30	GK	SWE	Mathias Nilsson (on loan to Lund, previously on loan at Eskilsminne)
31		SWE	Franz Brorsson (on loan to (Denmark) Esbjerg)
36		KOS	Patriot Sejdiu (on loan to Dalkurd)
38		SWE	Laorent Shabani (to Sirius)
–		SWE	Felix Konstandeliasz (to Lund, previously on loan at Mjällby)
–	GK	SWE	Jakob Tånnander (to (Finland) HJK, previously on loan at Lund)
–	GK	SWE	Marko Johansson (on loan to Mjällby, previously on loan at GAIS)

=== Mjällby ===
In: Note: Flags indicate national team as defined under FIFA eligibility rules; some limited exceptions apply. Players may hold more than one non-FIFA nationality.

No.	Pos.	Nation	Player
1	GK	SWE	Noel Törnqvist (from Halmia)
4	DF	SWE	Max Watson (from Jönköpings Södra, previously on loan)
6		SWE	Eric Björkander (from GIF Sundsvall)
10		GHA	Mamudo Moro (from Helsingborg)
14		SWE	Besard Sabovic (from Djurgården)
16	FW	SWE	Jacob Bergström (from (Norway) Mjøndalen)
17		DEN	Jasin Khayat (from Norrby)
21		SWE	Adam Petersson (promoted from junior squad)
30	GK	SWE	Marko Johansson (on loan from Malmö)
31		ESP	David Batanero (from GIF Sundsvall)
90		NGA	Moses Ogbu (from (England) Grimsby Town)

Out: Note: Flags indicate national team as defined under FIFA eligibility rules; some limited exceptions apply. Players may hold more than one non-FIFA nationality.

No.	Pos.	Nation	Player
1	GK	SWE	Jesper Johansson (retired)
1	GK	SVN	Nino Irgolić (loan return to (Slovenia) Maribor)
8		GAM	Bubacarr Jobe (on loan to Örgryte)
10		SWE	Mirza Halvadžić (to Lund)
11		SWE	William Kvist (to Varberg)
14		SWE	Kevin Höög Jansson (to (Denmark) Fremad Amager)
17		SWE	Charbel Georges (to Arameisk-Syrianska)
18		SWE	Philip Persson (released, previously on loan at Nosaby)
21		SWE	Felix Konstandeliasz (loan return to Malmö FF)
26		GAM	Mohammed Mbye (to IFÖ Bromölla)
29		NGA	Michael Omoh (to (Romania) Politehnica Iași)
—		SWE	Omar Dampha (on loan to IFÖ Bromölla, previously on loan at Kristianstad)
—		SWE	Pontus Jonsson (on loan to Karlskrona)
—		SWE	Jakob Ottosson (to Lund, previously on loan at Kristianstad)

=== Norrköping ===
In: Note: Flags indicate national team as defined under FIFA eligibility rules; some limited exceptions apply. Players may hold more than one non-FIFA nationality.

No.	Pos.	Nation	Player
10		SWE	Jonathan Levi (from (Norway) Rosenborg)
15		SWE	Carl Björk (loan return from Sylvia)
16		SWE	Pontus Almqvist (loan return from Sylvia)
17		SWE	Theodore Rask (from Sylvia)
26		SWE	Kristoffer Khazeni (from Sylvia)
29		SWE	Julius Lindgren (loan return from Sylvia)
77		SWE	Manasse Kusu (loan return from Sylvia)
—		SWE	Felix Jakobsson (from Torn)

Out: Note: Flags indicate national team as defined under FIFA eligibility rules; some limited exceptions apply. Players may hold more than one non-FIFA nationality.

No.	Pos.	Nation	Player
6		DEN	Kasper Larsen (to (Denmark) OB)
8		ISL	Guðmundur Þórarinsson (to (United States) New York City)
10		FIN	Simon Skrabb (to (Italy) Brescia)
17		SWE	Kalle Holmberg (to Djurgården)
24	GK	SWE	Gustav Jansson (to Värmbol)
97	GK	EST	Andreas Vaikla (to (Estonia) Trans Narva)
—		SWE	Johannes Vall (to Ljungskile, previously on loan at Öster)
—	DF	ISL	Alfons Sampsted (to (Norway) Bodø/Glimt, previously on loan at (Iceland) Breiðablik)
—		EGY	Alexander Jakobsen (to (Norway) Sarpsborg 08, previously on loan at Kalmar)
—		SWE	Felix Jakobsson (on loan to Sylvia)

=== Sirius ===
In: Note: Flags indicate national team as defined under FIFA eligibility rules; some limited exceptions apply. Players may hold more than one non-FIFA nationality.

No.	Pos.	Nation	Player
2		SWE	Adam Hellborg (from Kalmar)
13		SWE	Hjalmar Ekdal (on loan from Hammarby)
18		SWE	Laorent Shabani (from Malmö)
20		SWE	Joakim Persson (promoted from junior squad)
21		SWE	Simon Gefvert (from Karlslund)
23		JPN	Yukiya Sugita (from (Iran) Tractor Sazi)
25		SWE	Jamie Roche (promoted from junior squad)
27		SWE	Johan Karlsson (promoted from junior squad)
30	GK	CAN	Jonathan Viscosi (from (United States) San Antonio)
35	GK	SWE	Hannes Sveijer (promoted from junior squad)
77		NGA	Kennedy Igboananike (free transfer)
99		SWE	Nahom Girmai Netabay (from Varberg)

Out: Note: Flags indicate national team as defined under FIFA eligibility rules; some limited exceptions apply. Players may hold more than one non-FIFA nationality.

No.	Pos.	Nation	Player
2		SWE	Linus Nygren (retired)
6		SWE	Robert Åhman Persson (retired)
12		NGA	Henry Offia (to Dalkurd)
14		SWE	Ian Sirelius (retired)
18		SWE	Jesper Arvidsson (to Brommapojkarna)
19		SWE	Christer Gustafsson (to Brommapojkarna)
20		SWE	Sherko Faiqi (to AFK Linköping, previously on loan at Gefle)
21		NGA	John Junior Igbarumah (to Dalkurd)
23		SWE	Philip Haglund (to Brommapojkarna)
25		CIV	Abdul Razak (to Örgryte)
30	GK	SWE	John Alvbåge (to Lindome)

=== Varberg ===
In: Note: Flags indicate national team as defined under FIFA eligibility rules; some limited exceptions apply. Players may hold more than one non-FIFA nationality.

No.	Pos.	Nation	Player
2		SWE	Jon Birkfeldt (from Frej)
6		SWE	Albin Winbo (from Tvååker)
7		SWE	Robin Tranberg (from Dalkurd)
10		NGA	Monday Samuel (from (Israel) Bnei Yehuda)
12		SWE	Rasmus Cronvall (from Varbergs GIF)
16		SWE	Alexander Johansson (from Tvååker)
19		SWE	Gustaf Norlin (from Skövde)
21		RSA	Luke Le Roux (from (South Africa) SuperSport United)
27		RSA	Tashreeq Matthews (from (Germany) Borussia Dortmund II)
30	GK	SWE	Stojan Lukić (from Örgryte)
—		SWE	Axel Pettersson (from Oddevold)
—		SWE	William Kvist (from Mjällby)

Out: Note: Flags indicate national team as defined under FIFA eligibility rules; some limited exceptions apply. Players may hold more than one non-FIFA nationality.

No.	Pos.	Nation	Player
1	GK	USA	Matthew Pyzdrowski (released)
2		SWE	Tobias Carlsson (to Häcken)
6		SWE	Philip Ljung (on loan to Ängelholm)
7		SWE	Perparim Beqaj (to Ljungskile)
10		SWE	Robin Book (to Örebro)
11		SWE	Nahom Girmai Netabay (to Sirius)
12		IRQ	Rebin Asaad (to Torn)
12		SWE	Rasmus Cronvall (on loan to Varbergs GIF)
15		SWE	Edwin Condrup (on loan to Varbergs GIF)
17		SWE	Vuk Lugonjic (to Halmia)
21		SWE	Erik Zetterberg (to (Canada) FC Edmonton, previously on loan at Tvååker)
24		SWE	Hampus Danielsson (on loan to Varbergs GIF)
29		SWE	Nils Bertilsson (on loan to Tvååker, previously on loan at Varbergs GIF)
—		SWE	Jakob Bergman (to Umeå, previously on loan at Nyköping)
—		SWE	Axel Olsson (to Ängelholm, previously on loan)
–		SWE	William Kvist (on loan to Landskrona)
–		SWE	Axel Pettersson (on loan to Ljungskile)

=== Örebro ===
In: Note: Flags indicate national team as defined under FIFA eligibility rules; some limited exceptions apply. Players may hold more than one non-FIFA nationality.

No.	Pos.	Nation	Player
6	DF	SWE	Benjamin Hjertstrand (from Brage)
7	FW	SWE	Erik Björndahl (from Degerfors)
11	MF	SWE	Alfred Ajdarević (loan return from Värnamo)
16	MF	SWE	David Seger (from Sollentuna)
20	MF	SWE	Robin Book (from Varberg)
26	DF	DEN	Andreas Skovgaard (on loan from (Netherlands) Heerenveen)
29	FW	SWE	Jack Lahne (on loan from (France) Amiens)
30	GK	USA	Jake McGuire (from Gefle)
45	GK	SWE	Simon Gustafsson (promoted from junior squad)
—	DF	SWE	Nadir Ayéva (loan return from Karlslund)

Out: Note: Flags indicate national team as defined under FIFA eligibility rules; some limited exceptions apply. Players may hold more than one non-FIFA nationality.

No.	Pos.	Nation	Player
7	MF	SWE	Johan Bertilsson (to Degerfors)
9	FW	SWE	Viktor Prodell (to (Vietnam) Ho Chi Minh City)
13	FW	SWE	Rodin Deprem (to (Germany) Greuther Fürth II)
15	DF	SWE	Martin Lorentzson (retired)
16	MF	IRQ	Yaser Kasim (to (Iraq) Erbil)
18	FW	NGA	Isaac Boye (on loan to Ljungskile, previously on loan at Umeå)
30	GK	SWE	Mathias Karlsson (to GAIS)
45	GK	SWE	Simon Gustafsson (on loan to Forward)
48	MF	SWE	Adam Bark (to Motala)

=== Östersund ===
In: Note: Flags indicate national team as defined under FIFA eligibility rules; some limited exceptions apply. Players may hold more than one non-FIFA nationality.

No.	Pos.	Nation	Player
3		CIV	Kalpi Ouattara (from (Ivory Coast) ASEC, previously on loan)
11		SWE	Henrik Bellman (loan return from (Norway) Levanger)
80		GHA	Frank Arhin (loan return from Dalkurd)
99		FIN	Bakr Abdellaoui (from (Spain) Linense)

Out: Note: Flags indicate national team as defined under FIFA eligibility rules; some limited exceptions apply. Players may hold more than one non-FIFA nationality.

No.	Pos.	Nation	Player
2	DF	SWE	Tom Pettersson (to (United States) Cincinnati)
6	DF	SWE	Doug Bergqvist (to (Poland) Arka Gdynia, previously on loan at (Norway) Haugesund)
8		ENG	Jamie Hopcutt (released)
32		GHA	Patrick Kpozo (on loan to Luleå)
35		SWE	Isac Häggman (on loan to IFK Östersund)
36		SWE	Robin Wikberg (on loan to IFK Östersund)
99	FW	SWE	Dino Islamović (to (Norway) Rosenborg)
