= 2021 Hammarby Fotboll season =

Swedish football team

Hammarby Fotboll
2021 season
- Chairman: Richard von Yxkull
- Head coach: Stefan Billborn (until 11 June 2021); Miloš Milojević (from 13 June 2021)
- Stadium: Tele2 Arena
- Allsvenskan: 5th
- 2020–21 Svenska Cupen: Winners
- Conference League: Play-off round
- Top goalscorer: League: Gustav Ludwigson (11); All: Gustav Ludwigson (14)
- Highest home attendance: 29,317 (17 October vs AIK, Allsvenskan)
Home colours	Away colours	Third colours

The 2021 season was Hammarby Fotboll's 106th in existence, their 52nd season in Allsvenskan and their 7th consecutive season in the league. They competed in Allsvenskan, Svenska Cupen and Conference League during the year. League play started in April, initially behind closed doors due to the coronavirus pandemic. Stefan Billborn made his fourth season as manager, but was sacked after eight rounds and replaced by Miloš Milojević.

== Summary ==
On 30 May 2021, Hammarby IF won the 2020–21 Svenska Cupen, their first title in the main domestic cup, through a 5–4 win on penalties (0–0 after full-time) against BK Häcken in the final.

On 11 June 2021, Hammarby decided to terminate manager Stefan Billborn's contract, with the club placed 8th in the 2021 Allsvenskan table after eight rounds. On 13 June, Miloš Milojević, most recently an assistant at Red Star Belgrade, was appointed new head coach.

The side reached the play-off round of the 2021–22 UEFA Europa Conference League, after eliminating Maribor (4–1 on aggregate) and FK Čukarički (6–4 on aggregate), where it was knocked out by Basel on penalties (4–4 on aggregate).

In Allsvenskan, Hammarby finished in 5th place after a stronger second half of the campaign.

== Players ==
=== Squad information ===
N	Pos.	Nat.	Name	Age	Since	App	Goals	Ends	Transfer fee	Notes
1	GK	(Denmark)	David Ousted	36	2020	47	0	2021	Free	
2	DF	(Sweden)	Simon Sandberg	27	2018	95	1	2022	Free	
3	DF	(Sweden)	Dennis Widgren	27	2019	45	0	2022 (July)	Free	On loan to IK Sirius
4	DF	(Sweden)	Richard Magyar	30	2019	84	5	2022 (July)	Free	
5	DF	(Iraq)	Mohanad Jeahze	24	2020	35	1	2023	Undisclosed	
6	MF	(Sweden)	Darijan Bojanić (captain)	27	2019	81	5	2023 (July)	Free	
7	FW	(Slovenia)	Aljoša Matko	21	2021	13	2	2024 (July)	Undisclosed	
8	MF	(Denmark)	Jeppe Andersen	29	2017	121	5	2023 (July)	Free	
9	MF	(Brazil)	Paulinho	35	2020	27	4	2021	Free	
11	MF	(Montenegro)	Vladimir Rodić	28	2018	73	10	2021	Undisclosed	
13	DF	(Denmark)	Mads Fenger	31	2017	109	5	2023	Free	
15	MF	(Sweden)	Mayckel Lahdo	19	2021	7	0	2022	Youth system	
16	FW	(Sweden)	Gustav Ludwigson	28	2020	59	20	2024	Undisclosed	
17	MF	(Sweden)	Abdul Khalili	29	2020	40	6	2021	Free	
18	FW	(Sweden)	Filston Mawana	21	2019	0	0	2021	Undisclosed	
19	FW	(Sweden)	Jusef Erabi	18	2021	2	0		Youth system	
20	MF	(Ghana)	David Accam	31	2021	13	1	2021	Loan	On loan from Nashville SC
21	FW	(Kosovo)	Astrit Selmani	24	2021	26	9	2024	Undisclosed	
23	DF	(Iceland)	Jón Guðni Fjóluson	32	2021	21	1	2023	Free	
24	GK	(Sweden)	Oliver Dovin	19	2019	9	0	2024 (July)	Youth system	
25	GK	(Sweden)	Davor Blažević	28	2018	23	0	2022	Free	
27	DF	(Sweden)	Josafat Mendes	19	2021	0	0	2023 (July)	Youth system	
26	DF	(Sweden)	Kalle Björklund	22	2019	14	1	2022	Free	On loan to Västerås SK
29	FW	(Ivory Coast)	Bayéré Junior Loué	20	2021	5	0	2023	Undisclosed	On loan to Železničar Pančevo
32	DF	(Ivory Coast)	Aziz Ouattara Mohammed	20	2021	24	2	2023	Undisclosed	
33	MF	(Nigeria)	Akinkunmi Amoo	19	2020	35	9	2024 (July)	Undisclosed	
35	DF	(Sweden)	Axel Sjöberg	21	2020	3	0	2021	Free	On loan to IK Brage
40	DF	(Sweden)	Ben Engdahl	18	2021	1	0		Youth system	
42	DF	(Denmark)	Bjørn Paulsen	30	2021	78	15	2024	Free	
44	MF	(Sweden)	Williot Swedberg	17	2021	19	2	2024 (July)	Youth system	

- Last updated: 4 December 2021
- Source: Hammarby Fotboll and players' Wikipedia articles
- Ordered by squad number.

=== Transfers ===
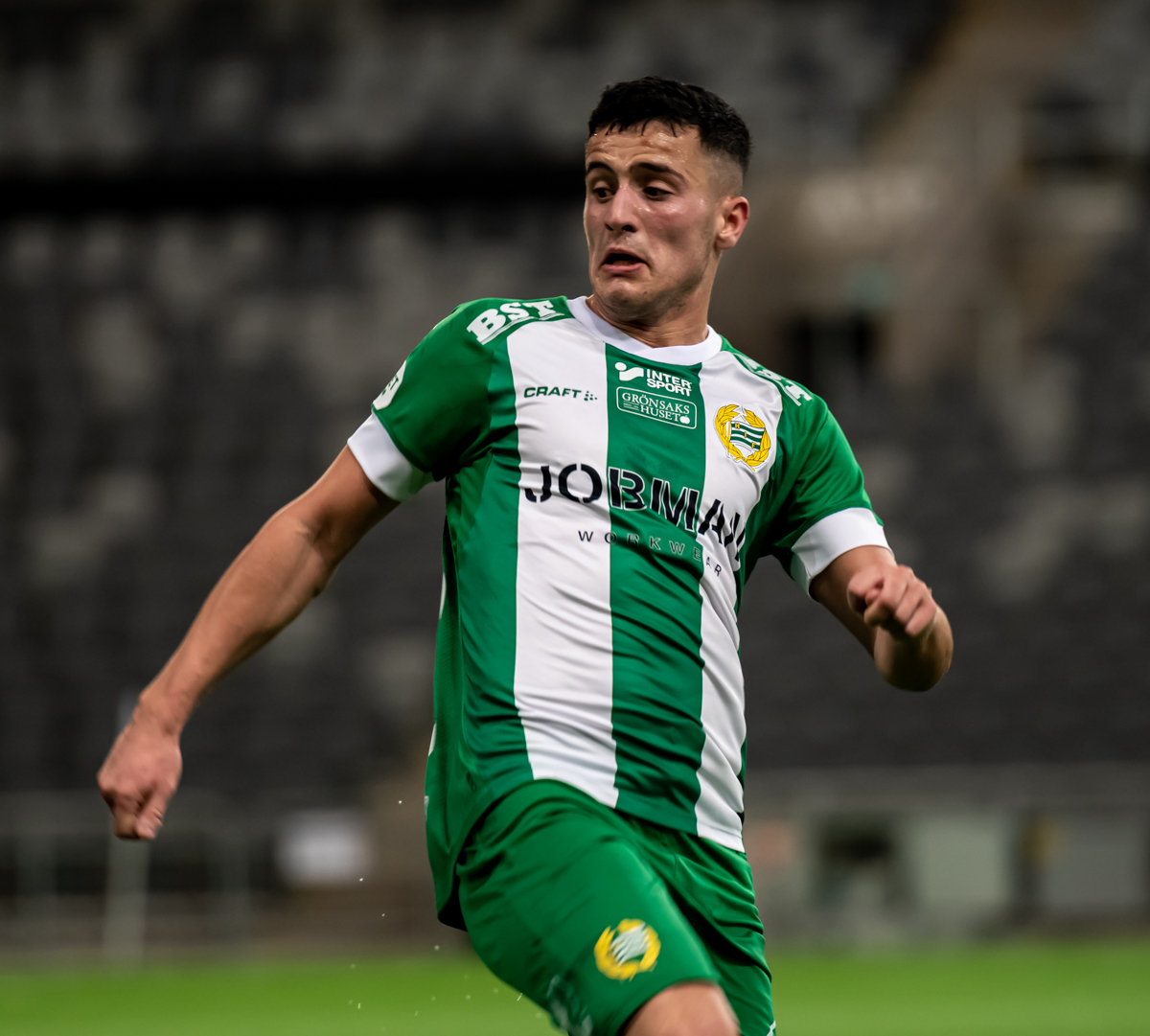
Forward Astrit Selmani was signed for a club record fee before the start of the 2021 season.

==== In ====
No.	Pos.	Nat.	Name	Age	Moving from	Type	Transfer window	Ends	Transfer fee	Source
21	FW	(Kosovo)	Astrit Selmani	23	Varbergs BoIS	Transfer	Winter	2024	Undisclosed	hammarbyfotboll.se
15	MF	(Sweden)	Mayckel Lahdo	18	Youth system	Promoted	Winter	2022	–	hammarbyfotboll.se
23	DF	(Iceland)	Jón Guðni Fjóluson	31	SK Brann (Norway)	Bosman	Winter	2023	Free	hammarbyfotboll.se
20	MF	(Ghana)	David Accam	30	Nashville SC (United States)	Loan	Winter	2021	Loan	hammarbyfotboll.se
42	DF	(Denmark)	Bjørn Paulsen	29	FC Ingolstadt (Germany)	Bosman	Winter	2024	Free	hammarbyfotboll.se
27	DF	(Sweden)	Josafat Mendes	18	Youth system	Promoted	Summer	2023 (July)	–	hammarbyfotboll.se
44	MF	(Sweden)	Williot Swedberg	17	Youth system	Promoted	Summer	2024 (July)	–	hammarbyfotboll.se
7	FW	(Slovenia)	Aljoša Matko	21	NK Maribor (Slovenia)	Transfer	Summer	2024 (July)	Undisclosed	hammarbyfotboll.se

==== Out ====
No.	Pos.	Nat.	Name	Age	Moving to	Type	Transfer window	Transfer fee	Source
19	MF	(Gabon)	Serge-Junior Martinsson Ngouali	28	(Croatia) HNK Gorica	End of contract	Winter	Free	hammarbyfotboll.se
23	FW	(United States)	Aron Jóhannsson	30	(Poland) Lech Poznań	End of contract	Winter	Free	hammarbyfotboll.se
21	DF	(Sweden)	Oscar Krusnell	21	IF Brommapojkarna	End of contract	Winter	Free	bpfotboll.se
15	DF	(Sweden)	Hjalmar Ekdal	22	Djurgårdens IF	Transfer	Winter	Undisclosed	hammarbyfotboll.se
26	DF	(Sweden)	Kalle Björklund	21	Falkenbergs FF	Loan	Winter	Loan	hammarbyfotboll.se
14	DF	(Sweden)	Tim Söderström	27	(Portugal) C.S. Marítimo	Transfer	Winter	Undisclosed	hammarbyfotboll.se
5	DF	(Sweden)	David Fällman	31	(Norway) Aalesunds FK	Transfer	Winter	Undisclosed	hammarbyfotboll.se
20	MF	(Sweden)	Alexander Kačaniklić	29	(Croatia) Hajduk Split	Transfer	Winter	Undisclosed	hammarbyfotboll.se
28	DF	(Brazil)	Jean	25	Varbergs BoIS	Transfer	Winter	Undisclosed	hammarbyfotboll.se
25	GK	(Sweden)	Davor Blažević	28	GIF Sundsvall	Loan	Winter	Loan	hammarbyfotboll.se
7	MF	(Sweden)	Imad Khalili	34	Retired	Loan	Winter	Free	hammarbyfotboll.se
3	DF	(Sweden)	Dennis Widgren	27	IK Sirius	Loan	Summer	Loan	hammarbyfotboll.se
19	MF	(Ghana)	Abdul Halik Hudu	21	(Denmark) Lyngby BK	Transfer	Summer	Undisclosed	hammarbyfotboll.se
26	DF	(Sweden)	Kalle Björklund	21	Västerås SK	Loan	Summer	Loan	hammarbyfotboll.se
35	DF	(Sweden)	Axel Sjöberg	21	IK Brage	Loan	Summer	Loan	hammarbyfotboll.se
31	MF	(Sweden)	Aimar Sher	18	(Italy) Spezia	Transfer	Summer	Undisclosed	hammarbyfotboll.se
29	FW	(Ivory Coast)	Bayéré Junior Loué	20	(Serbia) Železničar Pančevo	Loan	Summer	Loan	hammarbyfotboll.se

== Player statistics ==
=== Appearances and goals ===
No.	Pos	Nat	Player	Total		Allsvenskan		2020–21 and 2021–22 Svenska Cupen		Conference League	
No.	Pos	Nat	Player	Apps	Goals	Apps	Goals	Apps	Goals	Apps	Goals
Goalkeepers
1	GK	(Denmark) DEN	David Ousted	29	0	21+1	0	4	0	3	0
24	GK	(Sweden) SWE	Oliver Nnonyelu Dovin	13	0	8	0	2	0	3	0
31	GK	(Sweden) SWE	Davor Blažević	2	0	1	0	1	0	0	0
Defenders
2	DF	(Sweden) SWE	Simon Sandberg	32	1	16+8	1	4+1	0	0+3	0
4	DF	(Sweden) SWE	Richard Magyar	18	1	11+4	1	2+1	0	0	0
5	DF	(Iraq) IRQ	Mohanad Jeahze	39	2	27	1	5+1	0	6	1
13	DF	(Denmark) DEN	Mads Fenger	42	2	28+1	1	7	1	6	0
23	DF	(Iceland) ISL	Jón Guðni Fjóluson	33	3	21	1	6	0	6	2
27	DF	(Sweden) SWE	Josafat Mendes	2	0	0	0	0+1	0	0+1	0
32	DF	(Ivory Coast) CIV	Aziz Ouattara Mohammed	32	4	17+7	2	2+2	1	1+3	1
40	DF	(Sweden) SWE	Ben Engdahl	1	0	0+1	0	0	0	0	0
42	DF	(Denmark) DEN	Bjørn Paulsen	27	3	18+2	2	1	0	6	1
Midfielders
6	MF	(Sweden) SWE	Darijan Bojanić	39	1	23+6	1	3+1	0	6	0
8	MF	(Denmark) DEN	Jeppe Andersen	37	4	20+6	2	7	2	4	0
11	MF	(Montenegro) MNE	Vladimir Rodić	32	4	12+9	1	5+2	3	4	0
15	MF	(Sweden) SWE	Mayckel Lahdo	11	2	0+7	0	0+4	2	0	0
17	MF	(Sweden) SWE	Abdul Khalili	22	6	10+3	4	4	1	2+3	1
20	MF	(Ghana) GHA	David Accam	22	3	4+9	1	1+3	1	1+4	1
33	MF	(Nigeria) NGR	Akinkunmi Amoo	42	11	21+8	9	6+1	2	4+2	0
44	MF	(Sweden) SWE	Williot Swedberg	25	3	8+11	2	1	0	1+4	1
Forwards
7	FW	(Slovenia) SLO	Aljoša Matko	14	2	4+9	2	1	0	0	0
9	FW	(Brazil) BRA	Paulinho	13	1	2+9	1	0+1	0	0+1	0
16	FW	(Sweden) SWE	Gustav Ludwigson	42	14	28+2	11	5+1	2	6	1
18	FW	(Sweden) SWE	Filston Mawana	0	0	0	0	0	0	0	0
19	FW	(Sweden) SWE	Jusef Erabi	4	0	0+2	0	0	0	0+2	0
21	FW	(Kosovo) KOS	Astrit Selmani	39	15	23+3	9	7	1	6	5
Players transferred/loaned out during the season
3	DF	(Sweden) SWE	Dennis Widgren	2	0	0+2	0	0	0	0	0
7	MF	(Sweden) SWE	Imad Khalili	1	0	0	0	0+1	0	0	0
19	MF	(Ghana) GHA	Abdul Halik Hudu	5	0	0+1	0	3+1	0	0	0
29	FW	(Ivory Coast) CIV	Bayéré Junior Loué	8	0	1+4	0	0+2	0	0+1	0
31	MF	(Sweden) SWE	Aimar Sher	13	0	5+5	0	0+1	0	1+1	0
35	DF	(Sweden) SWE	Axel Sjöberg	4	0	1+1	0	0+2	0	0	0

Last updated: 4 December 2021
Source: hammarbyfotboll.se

== Club ==
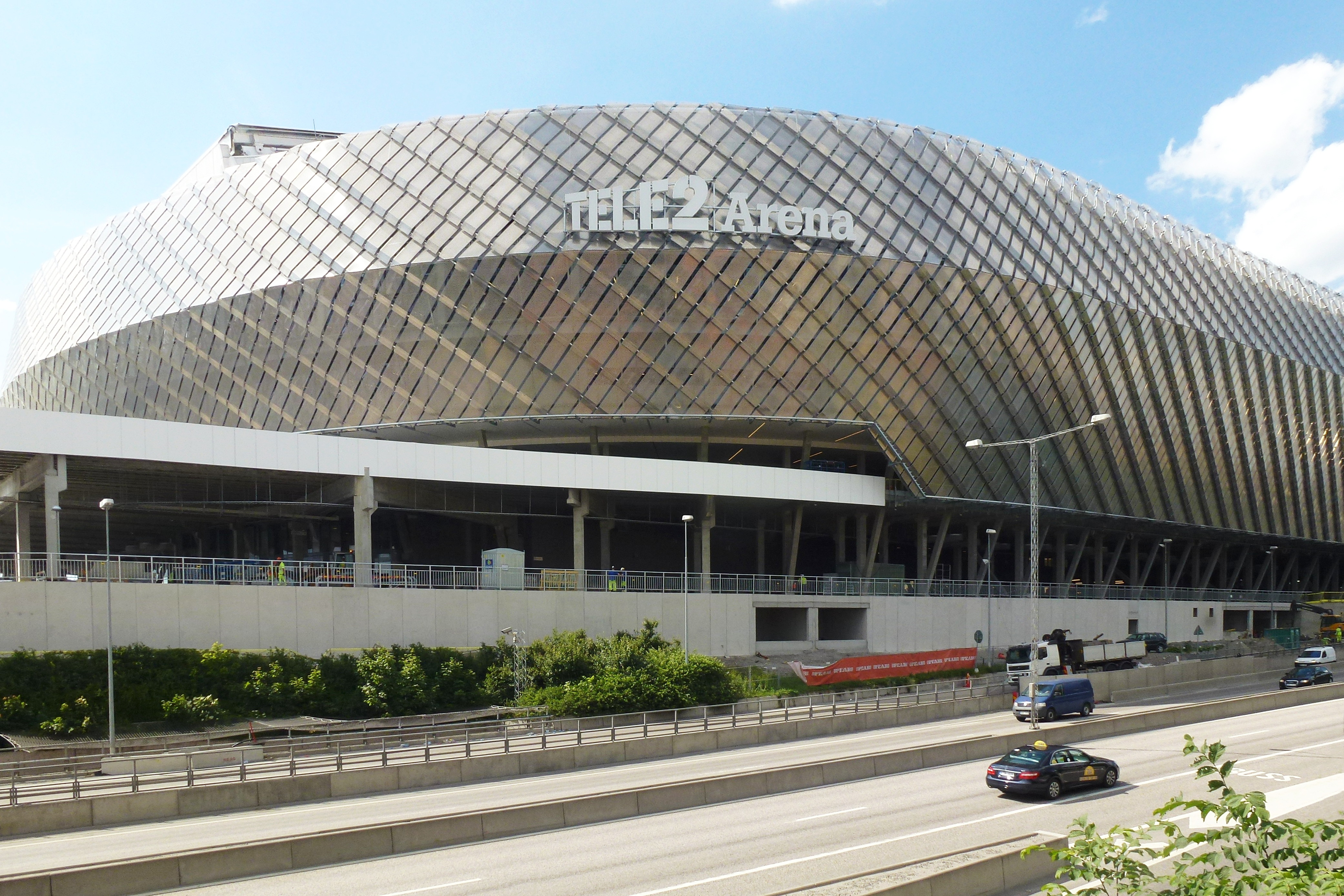
Tele2 Arena is the second largest stadium in Allsvenskan.

=== Coaching staff ===
Name	Role
(Serbia) Miloš Milojević	Head coach
(Sweden) Joachim Björklund	Assistant coach
(Sweden) Mikael "Mille" Olsson	Goalkeeping coach
(Sweden) Jimmy Lidberg	Fitness coach
(Sweden) Atena Gerontidou	Team manager
(Sweden) Wadda Tamimi	Assistant team manager
(England) David Sumpter	Data scientist
(Spain) Fran Peralta	Data scientist
(Sweden) Christian Andersson	Physio
(Sweden) Magnus Svärd	Physio
(Sweden) Ludvig Axelsson	Physio
(Sweden) Anders Bitén	Equipment manager
(Sweden) Fredrik Samuelsson	U19 head coach
(Sweden) Jonas Holtbäck	U17 head coach
(Sweden) Gustav Scheutz	U19 and U17 goalkeeping coach

=== Other information ===
Chairman	(Sweden) Richard von Yxkull
Managing director	(Sweden) Richard von Yxkull
Director of football	(Sweden) Jesper Jansson
Technical director	(Sweden) Ola Larsson
Head of scouting	(Sweden) Mikael Hjelmberg
Ground (capacity and dimensions)	Tele2 Arena (33,000 / )

== Pre-season and friendlies ==
=== Friendlies ===
3 February 2021 Friendly	Hammarby IF	3–3	Akropolis IF	Stockholm
14:00 CET (UTC+01)	Kačaniklić (yellow card) 22'; Erabi 31'; Selmani 79'; Rodić 85'	Report	Stadler 23', 53'; Nekrouf (yellow card) 61'; Pettersson 86'	Stadium: Tele2 Arena; Attendance: 0 Referee: Victor Wolf (Sweden)

7 February 2021 Friendly	Hammarby IF	2–1	IK Brage	Stockholm
13:00 CET (UTC+01)	Bojanić (yellow card) 35'; Loué 75'; Lahdo 80'	Report	Makasi (yellow card) 35', (goal) 45'; Antonsson (yellow card) 38'	Stadium: Tele2 Arena; Attendance: 0 Referee: Adam Ladebäck (Sweden)

11 February 2021 Friendly	Hammarby IF	1–1	IFK Norrköping	Stockholm
14:00 CET (UTC+02)	Amoo 34'	Report	Álvarez (yellow card) 25'; Levi 33'	Stadium: Tele2 Arena; Attendance: 0 Referee: Glenn Nyberg (Sweden)

== Competitions ==
=== Allsvenskan ===
==== League table ====
Pos	Team	Pld	W	D	L	GF	GA	GD	Pts	Qualification or relegation
3	Djurgårdens IF	30	17	6	7	46	30	+16	57	Qualification for the Europa Conference League second qualifying round (Note: The 2021–22 Svenska Cupen winners qualified for the Europa Conference League second qualifying round. Since the cup winners (Malmö FF) qualified based on league position, the cup winner spot was passed to the second-placed team, and the last Conference League second qualifying round spot was passed to the fourth-placed team.)
4	IF Elfsborg	30	17	4	9	51	35	+16	55	Qualification for the Europa Conference League second qualifying round
5	Hammarby IF	30	15	8	7	54	41	+13	53	
6	Kalmar FF	30	13	8	9	41	39	+2	47	
7	IFK Norrköping	30	13	5	12	45	41	+4	44	

Source: svenskfotboll.se (in Swedish)
Rules for classification: 1) Points; 2) Goal difference; 3) Goals scored; 4) Head-to-head points; 5) Head-to-head goal difference; 6) Head-to-head away goals scored; 7) Play-off
(Note: Play-off is only played if need to decide champion, teams for relegation or UEFA competition and will be played on a neutral ground).

==== Results summary ====
Overall								Home						Away					
Pld	W	D	L	GF	GA	GD	Pts	W	D	L	GF	GA	GD	W	D	L	GF	GA	GD
30	15	8	7	54	41	+13	53	11	3	1	35	19	+16	4	5	6	19	22	−3

Source: svenskfotboll.se (in Swedish)

==== Results by round ====
Round	1	2	3	4	5	6	7	8	9	10	11	12	13	14	15	16	17	18	19	20	21	22	23	24	25	26	27	28	29	30
Ground	A	H	A	H	H	A	H	A	H	H	A	H	A	A	H	A	H	A	H	H	A	H	H	H	A	A	H	A	A	H
Result	L	W	L	D	W	W	D	L	D	W	W	W	D	D	L	D	W	L	W	W	D	L	W	W	W	L	W	W	D	W
Position	13	7	10	10	7	4	5	8	8	6	5	4	5	5	5	5	5	6	6	6	6	7	6	5	5	6	5	5	5	5

Source: see below
A = Away; H = Home; W = Win; D = Draw; L = Loss

==== Matches ====
Kickoff times are in (UTC+01) unless stated otherwise.

===== April =====
10 April 2021 Round 1	Malmö FF	3–2	Hammarby IF	Malmö
15:00	Innocent (yellow card) 9'; Christiansen 36' (pen.); Rieks 40'; Knudsen 89'	Report	Ludwigson 21'; Fenger (yellow card) 27'; A. Khalili 45+7'; Ouattara (yellow card) 90+3'	Stadium: Eleda Stadion; Attendance: 8 Referee: Mohammed Al-Hakim (Sweden)

17 April 2021 Round 2	Hammarby IF	2–0	Mjällby AIF	Stockholm
15:00	Jeahze (yellow card) 37'; Amoo 45'; A. Khalili (yellow card) 63'; Ludwigson 75'	Report		Stadium: Tele2 Arena; Attendance: 8 Referee: Adam Ladebäck (Sweden)

25 April 2021 Round 3	AIK	2–0	Hammarby IF	Solna
15:00	Stefanelli 43'; Larsson (yellow card) 72'; Bahoui 77'; Papagiannopoulos (yellow card) 80'; Ylätupa (yellow card) 86'	Report	Selmani (yellow card) 53'; Fjóluson (yellow card) 61'; Sher (yellow card) 81'	Stadium: Friends Arena; Attendance: 8 Referee: Glenn Nyberg (Sweden)

===== May =====
1 May 2021 Round 4	Hammarby IF	1–1	BK Häcken	Stockholm
17:30	A. Khalili (yellow card) 3', (goal) 55'; Selmani (yellow card) 6'; Andersen (yellow card) 71'	Report	Faltsetas (yellow card) 6'; Jeremejeff 8'; Dahlberg (yellow card) 68'; Lindgren (yellow card) 79'	Stadium: Tele2 Arena; Attendance: 8 Referee: Kaspar Sjöberg (Sweden)

8 May 2021 Round 5	Hammarby IF	3–2	IK Sirius	Stockholm
15:00	A. Khalili 14'; Andersen 46'; Amoo 51'	Report	Björnström (yellow card) 11'; Ortmark 50'; Bulut 89'	Stadium: Tele2 Arena; Attendance: 8 Referee: Fredrik Klitte (Sweden)

12 May 2021 Round 6	Varbergs BoIS	1–3	Hammarby IF	Varberg
18:30	Tranberg (yellow card) 26'; Mörfelt 33'; Fofana (yellow card) 48'; Jean (yellow card) 76'; Zackrisson (yellow card) 79'	Report	Accam (yellow card) 38'; Sher (yellow card) 55'; Ouattara 67'; Sandberg (yellow card) 70'; Fenger 74'; Amoo 90+3'	Stadium: Varberg Energi Arena; Attendance: 8 Referee: Bojan Pandžić (Sweden)

16 May 2021 Round 7	Hammarby IF	2–2	Djurgårdens IF	Stockholm
17:30	Andersen (yellow card) 28'; Bojanić (yellow card) 42'; Ludwigson 48'; A. Khalili (yellow card) 76'; Selmani 80'	Report	Une Larsson (yellow card) 9'; Holmberg 45+4', (yellow card) 86'; Finndell 57'	Stadium: Tele2 Arena; Attendance: 8 Referee: Kristoffer Karlsson (Sweden)

23 May 2021 Round 8	Kalmar FF	2–1	Hammarby IF	Kalmar
15:00	Romário 39', (yellow card) 90+3'; Sjöstedt 68'	Report	Ludwigson 7'; Sandberg (yellow card) 11'; Magyar (yellow card) 82'; Guerreiro (yellow card) 90+1'	Stadium: Guldfågeln Arena; Attendance: 8 Referee: Granit Maqedonci (Sweden)

===== July =====
4 July 2021 Round 9	Hammarby IF	1–1	Halmstad BK	Stockholm
17:30	Accam 72'; Sher (yellow card) 82'	Report	Kurtulus (yellow card) 83'; Antonsson 90+1'	Stadium: Tele2 Arena; Attendance: 7 112; Referee: Mohammed Al-Hakim (Sweden)

11 July 2021 Round 10	Hammarby IF	5–1	Degerfors IF	Stockholm
15:00	Bojanić 44'; Ouattara (yellow card) 50'; Amoo 52'; Andersen (yellow card) 61', (goal) 90+2'; Swedberg 81'; Ludwigson 90+4'	Report	Ohlsson (yellow card) 36'; Ekroth (yellow card) 43'; Saidi 45+1', (yellow card) 61'	Stadium: Tele2 Arena; Attendance: 7 129; Referee: Kristoffer Karlsson (Sweden)

18 July 2021 Round 11	Örebro SK	5–1	Hammarby IF	Örebro
15:00	Almebäck (yellow card) 5'; Mårtensson (yellow card) 27'; Walker (yellow card) 56'; Wright (yellow card) 61'	Report	Selmani 1'; Sher (yellow card) 23'; Jeahze 69'; Bojanić (yellow card) 84'	Stadium: Behrn Arena; Attendance: 2 015; Referee: Bojan Pandžić (Sweden)

25 July 2021 Round 12	Hammarby IF	2–1	IFK Norrköping	Stockholm
17:30	Ludwigson 26'; Paulsen 83'; Amoo (yellow card) 90+5'	Report	Adegbenro 2'; Skúlason (yellow card) 39'	Stadium: Tele2 Arena; Attendance: 8 396; Referee: Fredrik Klitte (Sweden)

===== August =====
1 August 2021 Round 13	Östersunds FK	1–1	Hammarby IF	Östersund
17:30	Dosis (yellow card) 29'; Kpozo 38'; Kroon (yellow card) 45+1'; Sonko Sundberg (yellow card) 45+1'	Report	Accam (yellow card) 45+1'; Amoo (yellow card) 65'; Selmani 68'; Andersen (yellow card) 90+4'	Stadium: Jämtkraft Arena; Attendance: 2 298; Referee: Adam Ladebäck (Sweden)

8 August 2021 Round 14	IFK Göteborg	0–0	Hammarby IF	Gothenburg
17:30	Erlingmark (yellow card) 84'; Berg (yellow card) 85'	Report	Andersen (yellow card) 34'; Sher (yellow card) 47'	Stadium: Nya Ullevi; Attendance: 9 337; Referee: Victor Wolf (Sweden)

15 August 2021 Round 15	Hammarby IF	0–2	IF Elfsborg	Stockholm
17:30	Swedberg (yellow card) 32'; Khalili (yellow card) 76'; Jeahze (yellow card) 85'	Report	Alm 26'; Okkels (yellow card) 66'; Bernhardsson 67'	Stadium: Tele2 Arena; Attendance: 8 224; Referee: Andreas Ekberg (Sweden)

22 August 2021 Round 16	IF Elfsborg	2–2	Hammarby IF	Borås
15:00	Bernhardsson 5'; Rømer (yellow card) 39'; Ndione (yellow card) 58'; Holst (yellow card) 60'; Ondrejka 80'	Report	Bojanić (yellow card) 60'; Fjóluson (yellow card) 66'; Matko 90+1'; Khalili 90+5' (pen.)	Stadium: Borås Arena; Attendance: 2 895; Referee: Kristoffer Karlsson (Sweden)

29 August 2021 Round 17	Hammarby IF	2–1	Malmö FF	Stockholm
17:30	Ludwigson 2'; Selmani 68', (yellow card) 86'	Report	Bjørn Paulsen 6' (o.g.); Berget (yellow card) 77'	Stadium: Tele2 Arena; Attendance: 10 002; Referee: Mohammed Al-Hakim (Sweden)

===== September =====
12 September 2021 Round 18	Djurgårdens IF	4–1	Hammarby IF	Stockholm
17:30	Eriksson 30'; Ekdal 39'; Asoro 42'; Chilufya 74'; Käck (yellow card) 83'	Report	Ludwigson 19'; Fenger (yellow card) 35'; Ouattara (yellow card) 48'; Jeahze (yellow card) 88'	Stadium: Tele2 Arena; Attendance: 9 120; Referee: Andreas Ekberg (Sweden)

20 September 2021 Round 19	Hammarby IF	1–0	Hammarby IF	Stockholm
19:00	Amoo 45+3'; Magyar (yellow card) 71'; Selmani (yellow card) 72'	Report	Matthews (yellow card) 18'; Zackrisson (yellow card) 30'; Ejupi (yellow card) 36'; Lindner (yellow card) 45+3'; Lukić (yellow card) 45+3'; Mensah (yellow card) 68'	Stadium: Tele2 Arena; Attendance: 9 514; Referee: Kristoffer Karlsson (Sweden)

23 September 2021 Round 20	Hammarby IF	3–0	IFK Göteborg	Stockholm
19:00	Amoo 6'; Ouattara 45+3'; Jeahze (yellow card) 45+5'; Rodić 70'; Paulsen (yellow card) 77'	Report	Erlingmark (yellow card) 45+2'	Stadium: Tele2 Arena; Attendance: 9 655; Referee: Kaspar Sjöberg (Sweden)

26 September 2021 Round 21	BK Häcken	1–1	Hammarby IF	Gothenburg
17:30	Berggren (yellow card) 29'; Jeremejeff 45+2'; Faltsetas (yellow card) 75'	Report	Fjóluson 31'; Ludwigson (yellow card) 41'; Ouattara (yellow card) 48'; Bojanić (yellow card) 61'	Stadium: Bravida Arena; Attendance: 1 748; Referee: Mohammed Al-Hakim (Sweden)

===== October =====
3 October 2021 Round 22	IFK Norrköping	3–1	Hammarby IF	Norrköping
17:30	Levi 16' (pen.); Adegbenro 45+1', 79'	Report	Fenger (yellow card) 16'; Ouattara (yellow card) 53'; Selmani (yellow card) 61'; Wahlqvist 64' (o.g.)	Stadium: PlatinumCars Arena; Attendance: 13 174; Referee: Victor Wolf (Sweden)

17 October 2021 Round 23	Hammarby IF	1–0	AIK	Stockholm
15:00	Swedberg (yellow card) 41'; Magyar (yellow card) 52'; Amoo 58'	Report	Papagiannopoulos (yellow card) 41'	Stadium: Tele2 Arena; Attendance: 29 317; Referee: Andreas Ekberg (Sweden)

24 October 2021 Round 24	Hammarby IF	4–3	Östersunds FK	Stockholm
15:00	Sonko Sundberg 15' (o.g.); Swedberg 24'; Jeahze (yellow card) 52'; Bojanić (yellow card) 74'; Ludwigson 77'; Amoo 90+3' (pen.); Matko (yellow card) 90+4'	Report	Weymans 8', (yellow card) 70'; Turgott 14'; Fritzson 19'; Sonko Sundberg (yellow card) 52'; Mensiro (red card) 76'	Stadium: Tele2 Arena; Attendance: 21 337; Referee: Kaspar Sjöberg (Sweden)

27 October 2021 Round 25	IK Sirius	0–1	Hammarby IF	Uppsala
19:00	Hellborg (yellow card) 27'; Netabay (yellow card) 34'; Mathisen (yellow card) 56'	Report	Magyar 26'; Ouattara (yellow card) 34'; Paulinho (yellow card) 90'	Stadium: Studenternas IP; Attendance: 7 387; Referee: Fredrik Klitte (Sweden)

===== November =====
1 November 2021 Round 26	Mjällby AIF	2–0	Hammarby IF	Hällevik
19:00	Bergström (yellow card) 16'; Nilsson (yellow card) 34'; Moros Gracia 47'; Moro 90+1'	Report	Jeahze (yellow card) 44'; Fenger (yellow card) 77'; Paulsen (yellow card) 82'	Stadium: Strandvallen; Attendance: 3 809; Referee: Granit Maqedonci (Sweden)

7 November 2021 Round 27	Hammarby IF	3–2	Örebro SK	Stockholm
15:00	Sandberg 52'; Amoo 66'; Ludwigson 85'	Report	Walker (yellow card) 24'; Bjørn Paulsen 44' (o.g.); Bergmark (yellow card) 48'; Mårtensson (yellow card) 56'; Besara 64'	Stadium: Tele2 Arena; Attendance: 22 013; Referee: Mohammed Al-Hakim (Sweden)

21 November 2021 Round 28	Degerfors IF	1–4	Hammarby IF	Degerfors
15:00	Edvardsen 88'	Report	Selmani (yellow card) 11', (goal) 33' (pen.); Paulsen 19'; Paulinho 56'; Ludwigson 77'	Stadium: Stora Valla; Attendance: 3 978; Referee: Kristoffer Karlsson (Sweden)

28 November 2021 Round 29	Halmstads BK	0–0	Hammarby IF	Halmstad
17:30	Kurtulus (yellow card) 19'; Tot Wikström (yellow card) 33'; An. Johansson (yellow card) 86'	Report	Fenger (yellow card) 77'; Matko (yellow card) 80'; Lahdo (yellow card) 84'	Stadium: Örjans Vall; Attendance: 4 277; Referee: Kaspar Sjöberg (Sweden)

===== December =====
4 December 2021 Round 30	Hammarby IF	5–3	Kalmar FF	Stockholm
15:00	Astrit Selmani 6', 19', 23', 50'; Matko 76'	Report	S. Ring (yellow card) 10'; Jansson 33'; J. Ring 56'; Sachpekidis (yellow card) 71'; Israelsson 73'	Stadium: Tele2 Arena; Attendance: 21 213; Referee: Adam Ladebäck (Sweden)

=== Svenska Cupen ===
==== 2020–21 ====
The tournament continued from the 2020 season.

Kickoff times are in UTC+1.

===== Group 3 =====
Pos	Team	Pld	W	D	L	GF	GA	GD	Pts	Qualification
1	Hammarby IF	3	3	0	0	10	3	+7	9	Advance to Knockout stage
2	AIK	3	2	0	1	8	4	+4	6	
3	AFC Eskilstuna	3	1	0	2	5	9	−4	3	
4	Oskarshamns AIK	3	0	0	3	2	9	−7	0	

Updated to match(es) played on 7 March 2021. Source: SFA
Rules for classification: 1) Points; 2) Goal difference; 3) Goals scored; 4) Head-to-head record; 5) Highest ranked team

20 February 2021 Matchday 1	Hammarby IF	4–1	AFC Eskilstuna	Stockholm
13:00	Andersen 11'; Selmani 17'; A. Khalili 47', (yellow card) 59'; Fenger 70'; Sandberg (yellow card) 76'	Report	Ahl Holmström 67'	Stadium: Tele2 Arena; Attendance: 0 Referee: Farouk Nehdi (Sweden)

28 February 2021 Matchday 2	Oskarshamns AIK	0–3	Hammarby IF	Oskarshamn
15:00	Ekeroth (yellow card) 32'; Agebjörn (yellow card) 34'	Report	Sawo 6' (o.g.); Fenger (yellow card) 51'; Amoo 59'; Rodić 61'; Sjöberg (yellow card) 90'	Stadium: Arena Oskarshamn; Attendance: 0 Referee: Fredrik Hansson (Sweden)

7 March 2021 Matchday 3	Hammarby IF	3–2	AIK	Stockholm
13:00	Amoo 19'; Rodić 56', (yellow card) 85'; Magyar (red card) 64'; A. Khalili (yellow card) 71'; Ludwigson 82'	Report	Ylätupa 49'; Otieno (yellow card) 71'; Larsson 73' (pen.); Goitom (yellow card) 77'	Stadium: Tele2 Arena; Attendance: 0 Referee: Mohammed Al-Hakim (Sweden)

===== Knockout stage =====
1 April 2021 Quarter-finals	Hammarby IF	3–2 (a.e.t.)	Trelleborgs FF	Stockholm
19:00	Andersen 9', (yellow card) 38'; Amoo (yellow card) 62'; Selmani (yellow card) 75'; Ousted (yellow card) 90+2'; Ludwigson 93'; Accam 99'	Report	Blomberg (yellow card) 31'; Björkén (yellow card) 66'; Liverstam (yellow card) 81'; Petrović 88' (pen.); Brkić (yellow card) 102'; Kozica 109'; Dhaini (yellow card) 102'	Stadium: Tele2 Arena; Attendance: 0 Referee: Joakim Östling (Sweden)
Note: Match was postponed from its original date due to an outbreak of COVID-19 in Hammarby's first-team squad.

4 April 2021 Semi-finals	Djurgårdens IF	0–1	Hammarby IF	Stockholm
13:00	Une Larsson (yellow card) 22'; Finndell (yellow card) 42'; Eriksson (yellow card) 90+4'	Report	Ouattara 17'; Fenger (yellow card) 25'; Andersen (yellow card) 57'	Stadium: Tele2 Arena; Attendance: 0 Referee: Fredrik Klitte (Sweden)
Note: Match was postponed from its original date due to an outbreak of COVID-19 in Hammarby's first-team squad.

30 May 2021 Final	Hammarby IF	0–0 (a.e.t.) (5–4 p)	BK Häcken	Stockholm
14:30	Andersen (yellow card) 28' (yellow-red card) 120'; Sandberg (yellow card) 65'; Fenger (yellow card) 74'; Selmani (yellow card) 83'; Ousted (yellow card) 104'; Amoo (yellow card) 105+1'	Report	Toivio (yellow card) 20'; Berggren (yellow card) 83'; Jeremejeff (red card) 105'	Stadium: Tele2 Arena; Attendance: 0 Referee: Kaspar Sjöberg (Sweden)
	Penalties
	Paulinho (penalty scored); Accam (penalty scored); Fenger (penalty scored); Sher (penalty scored); Selmani (penalty scored)		(penalty scored) Faltsetas; (penalty scored) Bengtsson; (penalty scored) Toivio; (penalty missed) Traoré; (penalty scored) Youssef

==== 2021–22 ====
The tournament continues into the 2022 season.

===== Qualification stage =====
20 October 2021 Round 2	Hudiksvalls FF	1–3	Hammarby IF	Hudiksvall
17:00	Zerai (yellow card) 76'; Wickman 79'; Bergquist (yellow card) 90+4'	Report	Ouattara (yellow card) 30'; Rodić 64'; Lahdo 87', 90'	Stadium: Glysisvallen; Attendance: 637; Referee: Henrik Mohlin (Sweden)

=== UEFA Europa Conference League ===
Kickoff times are in UTC+1 unless stated otherwise.

==== 2021–22 ====
===== Qualifying phase and play-off round =====
====== Second qualifying round ======
23 July 2021 First leg	Hammarby IF	3–1	NK Maribor	Stockholm
18:45	Selmani 55', 64', 87' (pen.)	Report	Žugelj 60'; Voloder (yellow card) 74'; Vrhovec (yellow card) 81'	Stadium: Tele2 Arena; Attendance: 7 250; Referee: Nick Walsh, (Scotland)

29 July 2021 Second leg	NK Maribor	0–1 (1–4 agg.)	Hammarby IF	Maribor
20:45	Šturm (yellow card) 21'; Milec (yellow card) 67'	Report	Accam 5'; Ouattara (yellow card) 68'	Stadium: Ljudski vrt Attendance: 5 025; Referee: Juan Martínez Munuera, (Spain)

====== Third qualifying round ======
5 August 2021 First leg	FK Čukarički (Serbia)	3-1	(Sweden) Hammarby	Belgrade
21:00 CEST	Jovanović 22'; Docić 40', 53', (yellow card) 90'; Roganovic (yellow card) 39'; Šapić (yellow card) 64'; Drezgić (yellow card) 90'	Report	Ludwigson 25'; Jeahze (yellow card) 15'; Andersen (yellow card) 31'; Fjóluson (yellow card) 69'; Swedberg (yellow card) 84'; Bojanić (yellow card) 89'	Stadium: Partizan Stadium; Attendance: 1 496; Referee: Yevhen Aranovskyi (Ukraine)

12 August 2021 Second leg	Hammarby (Sweden)	5–1 (6–4 agg.)	(Serbia) FK Čukarički	Stockholm
18:45 CEST	Jeahze 12'; Selmani 26', 72'; Paulsen 44'; Rodić (yellow card) 61'; Swedberg 67'; Andersen (yellow card) 75'	Report	Tanasijević (yellow card) 25'; Šapić (yellow card) 45+1'; N'Diaye 64'	Stadium: Tele2 Arena; Attendance: 7 651; Referee: Dennis Higler (Netherlands)

====== Play-off round ======
19 August 2021 First leg	FC Basel (Switzerland)	3-1	(Sweden) Hammarby	Basel
19:30 CEST	Cabral 30', 87', 90' (pen.); Esposito (yellow card) 70'; Stocker (yellow card) 82'	Report	Amoo (yellow card) 8'; Khalili 71'; Bojanić (yellow card) 82'; Fjóluson (yellow card) 90+3'	Stadium: St. Jakob-Park; Attendance: 12 144; Referee: Sergey Ivanov (Russia)

23 August 2021 Second leg	Hammarby (Sweden)	3–1 (a.e.t.) (3–3 agg.) (3–4 p)	(Switzerland) FC Basel	Stockholm
19:00 CEST	Khalili (yellow card) 9'; Fjóluson 48', 54'; Selmani (yellow card) 63'; Ouattara 101', (yellow card) 108'	Report	Xhaka (yellow card) 9'; Lang (yellow card) 53'; Cabral 109' (pen.), (yellow card) 120+1'	Stadium: Tele2 Arena; Attendance: 7 855; Referee: Bobby Madden (Scotland)
	Penalties
	Bojanić (penalty missed); Paulinho (penalty missed); Accam (penalty scored); Fenger (penalty scored); Sandberg (penalty scored)		(penalty scored) Cömert; (penalty scored) Frei; (penalty missed) Pelmard; (penalty scored) Pululu; (penalty scored) Cabral
