= Akinkunmi Amoo =

Nigerian footballer (born 2002)

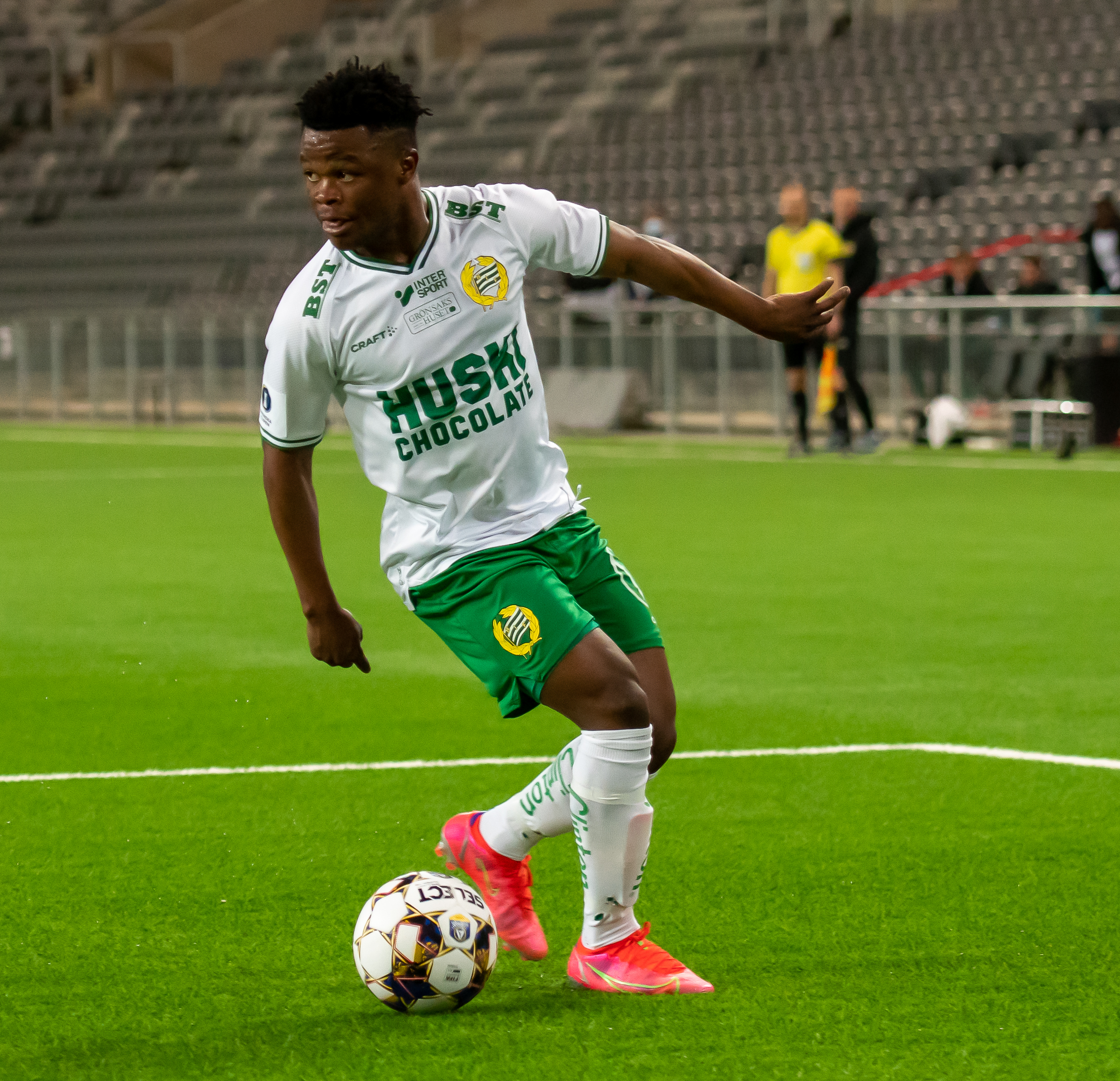
- Amoo with Hammarby IF in 2021

Personal information
- Full name: Akinkunmi Ayobami Amoo
- Date of birth: 7 June 2002 (age 24)
- Place of birth: Ibadan, Nigeria
- Height: 1.63 m (5 ft 4 in)
- Position: Winger

Team information
- Current team: Ratchaburi

Youth career
- Brightville Academy
- Sidos FC

Senior career*
Years	Team	Apps	(Gls)
2020–2022	Hammarby IF	35	(9)
2022–2023	Copenhagen	4	(1)
2023–2024	Omonia	5	(0)
2025	Shanghai Jiading Huilong	22	(4)
2026–	Ratchaburi	0	(0)

International career^{‡}
2019	Nigeria U17	10	(1)
- * Club domestic league appearances and goals as of 3 March 2024 ‡ National team caps and goals as of 8 June 2020

Akinkunmi Ayobami Amoo (born 7 June 2002) is a Nigerian professional footballer who plays as a winger for Ratchaburi.

== Early life ==
Amoo was born in Ibadan, and started playing youth football at Brightville Academy. In his teens, he moved to Lagos to join Sidos FC.

== Club career ==
=== Hammarby IF ===
==== 2020 ====
On 8 June 2020, shortly after his 18th birthday, Amoo transferred to Swedish club Hammarby IF on a four-year contract. In the process, he reportedly turned down a move to Monaco and Milan. Amoo made his competitive debut in Allsvenskan on 14 September, in a 2–2 home draw against Helsingborgs IF. On 10 November, Amoo scored a brace, his first competitive goals for Hammarby IF, in a 5–0 win against FC Gute in Svenska Cupen, the main domestic cup.

==== 2021 ====
In 2021, following the departure of Alexander Kačaniklić, Amoo established himself as a regular starter for Hammarby. On 7 March, he scored a long-range strike against rivals AIK in a 3–2 home win in Svenska Cupen, which meant that his side advanced to the quarter-finals of the tournament. On 17 April, Amoo scored his first league goal in Allsvenskan for the club, in a 2–0 home win against Mjällby AIF. On 30 May, Amoo won the 2020–21 Svenska Cupen with Hammarby, through a 5–4 win on penalties (0–0 after full-time) against BK Häcken in the final. He featured in all six games as the side reached the play-off round of the 2021–22 UEFA Europa Conference League, after eliminating Maribor (4–1 on aggregate) and FK Čukarički (6–4 on aggregate), where the club was knocked out by Basel (4–4 on aggregate) after a penalty shoot-out. Following his performances throughout the year, Amoo reportedly attracted interest from big European clubs like Ajax, Leicester and Valencia. He was one of three finalists for Allsvenskan young player of the year, that ultimately was awarded to Veljko Birmančević from Malmö FF.

=== F.C. Copenhagen ===
On 31 January 2022, Amoo signed a five-year deal with F.C. Copenhagen in the Danish Superliga. The fee was reportedly set at around €4.4 million, plus bonuses and a sell-on clause, making it a record breaking transfer for Hammarby. He also became one of Copenhagen's record arrivals, in the same region as Pep Biel and Ísak Bergmann Jóhannesson.

=== Omonia ===
On 13 September 2023, Amoo signed a three-year deal with Omonia.

On 2 March 2024, Amoo terminated his contract with Omonia for personal reasons.

=== Shanghai Jiading Huilong ===
In February 2025, Amoo joined China League One side Shanghai Jiading Huilong.

== International career ==
Amoo began his international career with Nigeria in the 2019 Africa U-17 Cup of Nations, and scored in his debut in a 5–4 group stage win against Tanzania, where they finished fourth in the tournament. Later the same year, Amoo was part of the Nigerian squad that got knocked out in the round of 16 during the 2019 U-17 World Cup.

In early 2022, Amoo was sought out by Nigeria head coach Augustine Eguavoen for the 2021 Africa Cup of Nations, as a replacement for Odion Ighalo who had to withdraw from the tournament, but the call-up was not granted by the Confederation of African Football.

== Style of play ==
A left-footed player, Amoo is known for his pace, ball control and technical ability. As an inverted winger, he is prone to dribble and cut inside from the flank. Due to his small stature, low centre of gravity and agility, Amoo has been compared with Lionel Messi in his native country, even gaining the nickname "portable" by his teammate Kelechi Iheanacho.

== Rape and sexual assault convictions ==
In September 2022, Amoo was arrested and detained for charges related to sexual assaults in Copenhagen, Denmark. According to reports the incident occurred between April 2022 through August 2022 leading to his arrest in September 2022. He was granted bail in October 2022 after being detained for one month. Amoo has been charged with rape in a sexual relationship other than intercourse, defamation as well as attempted rape and violations of two other women. On June 27, 2023 several Nigeria media outlets revealed that Amoo had been sentenced to one year in prison for sexual assaults. Following an unsuccessful appeal against the convictions in June 2024, Danish media named Amoo as the perpetrator and confirmed the convictions. As of July 2026 - Akinkunmi is wanted by the danish police, as it is believed that he is attempting to hide internationally in order to evade his sentence being carried out.

== Career statistics ==
As of 13 November 2022

Appearances and goals by club, season and competition
Club	Season	League			Cup		Europe		Total	
Club	Season	Division	Apps	Goals	Apps	Goals	Apps	Goals	Apps	Goals
Hammarby IF	2020	Allsvenskan	6	0	1	2	0	0	7	2
Hammarby IF	2021	Allsvenskan	29	9	7	2	6 (Note: Appearances in UEFA Europa Conference League)	0	42	11
Hammarby IF	Total		35	9	8	4	6	0	49	13
Copenhagen	2021–22	Danish Superliga	2	1	0	0	0	0	2	1
Copenhagen	2022–23	Danish Superliga	2	0	0	0	0	0	2	0
Copenhagen	Total		4	1	0	0	0	0	4	1
Career total			39	10	8	4	6	0	53	14

== Honours ==
Hammarby IF

- Svenska Cupen: 2020–21
