= Ben Engdahl =

Swedish footballer

Personal information
- Full name: Ben Mikael Engdahl
- Date of birth: 17 September 2003 (age 23)
- Place of birth: Stockholm, Sweden
- Height: 1.79 m (5 ft 10 in)
- Position: Right-back

Team information
- Current team: BK Häcken
- Number: 17

Youth career
- –2019: Brommapojkarna
- 2020–2021: Hammarby IF

Senior career*
Years	Team	Apps	(Gls)
2021–2022	Hammarby IF	1	(0)
2022	→ Hammarby TFF	12	(0)
2022–2024	Nordsjælland	0	(0)
2023	→ Jönköpings Södra (loan)	12	(0)
2024	→ Helsingør (loan)	3	(0)
2024–	BK Häcken	7	(0)
2024	→ Utsiktens BK (loan)	3	(0)

International career
2019	Sweden U17	4	(1)
2021–2022	Sweden U19	2	(0)
- * Club domestic league appearances and goals as of 5 August 2025

Ben Mikael Engdahl (born 17 September 2003) is a Swedish footballer who plays as a right-back for Allsvenskan club BK Häcken.

== Early life ==
Born and raised in Stockholm, Engdahl played youth football with local club IF Brommapojkarna.

On 3 January 2020, Engdahl joined the youth academy of Hammarby IF. He competed in the 2021–22 UEFA Youth League with the club, getting knocked out by Rangers in the first round through 1–5 on aggregate.

== Club career ==
=== Hammarby IF ===
On 21 November 2021, Engdahl made his debut for Hammarby in Allsvenskan in a 4–1 away win against Degerfors IF. In 2022, he made 12 appearances for affiliated club Hammarby TFF in Ettan, the domestic third tier.

=== Nordsjælland ===
On 10 August 2022, Engdahl transferred to Nordsjælland in the Danish Superliga, signing a five-year contract.

Still yet to make his Nordsjælland debut, the club confirmed on August 4, 2023, that Engdahl would spend the rest of 2023 on loan at Superettan club Jönköpings Södra IF. The very next day, Engdahl made his debut when he was in the starting lineup against Utsiktens BK.

On transfer deadline day, February 1, 2024, Engdahl was loaned to Danish 1st Division side FC Helsingør for the rest of the season. After finishing his loan spell, Engdahl returned to Nordsjælland.

There were just two official appearances for FC Nordsjælland's first team, both in the Danish Cup, and a few matches for the club's U-19 and reserve teams before Engdahl left Nordsjælland in August 2024.

=== BK Häcken ===
On August 24, 2024, Swedish Allsvenskan club BK Häcken confirmed that Engdahl joined the club on a deal until the end of 2027.

== International career ==
On 13 November 2021, Engdahl made his debut for the Swedish U19's in a 2–0 home win against Andorra.

== Career statistics ==
=== Club ===
As of 9 August 2022

Club	Season	League			Cup		Continental		Total	
Club	Season	Division	Apps	Goals	Apps	Goals	Apps	Goals	Apps	Goals
Hammarby TFF	2022	Ettan	12	0	0	0	0	0	12	0
Total			12	0	0	0	0	0	12	0
Hammarby IF	2021	Allsvenskan	1	0	0	0	0	0	1	0
Hammarby IF	2022	Allsvenskan	0	0	2	0	—		2	0
Total			1	0	2	0	0	0	3	0
Career total			12	0	2	0	0	0	14	0
