= Michael Hartmann (soccer) =

American soccer player

Personal information
- Full name: Michael Hartmann
- Date of birth: June 13, 1994 (age 32)
- Place of birth: Medford, New Jersey, United States
- Height: 1.84 m (6 ft 1/2 in)
- Position: Goalkeeper

Team information
- Current team: Östers
- Number: 33

College career
Years	Team	Apps	(Gls)
2012–2015	Caldwell Cougars	70	(0)

Senior career*
Years	Team	Apps	(Gls)
2015	Ocean City Nor'easters	0	(0)
2016	Kolstad	0	(0)
2017–2019	Linköping City	79	(0)
2020–2021	Haka	10	(0)
2021–2026	Oskarshamn	87	(0)
2026–	Östers	2	(0)
- * Club domestic league appearances and goals as of 21 July 2026

Michael Hartmann (born June 13, 1994) is an American professional soccer player who plays as a goalkeeper for Östers.

Raised in Medford, New Jersey, Hartmann played prep soccer at Shawnee High School.

== Career ==
=== College ===
Hartmann played four years of college soccer at Division II school, Caldwell University between 2012 and 2015. During his senior year, Hartmann was also part of the Ocean City Nor'easters side who competed in the USL PDL.

=== Professional ===
Hartmann had trials in Norway before joining 3. divisjon team Kolstad FK, but couldn't play with the team due to work permit issues. He later has trials with Swedish fourth-tier side Linköping City, who he signed with and played with for three seasons, achieving promotion to the third-tier in 2018.

In January 2020, Hartmann joined Finnish top division side FC Haka. He registered ten league appearances and eight in the cup before leaving the club.

In 2021, Hartmann returned to Sweden, signing with third-tier club, Oskarshamns AIK.

In January 2026, Hartmann joined Superettan side Östers on a two-year deal.
