= Oliver Dovin =

Swedish footballer (born 2002)

- Dovin with Leyton Orient in 2026

Personal information
- Full name: Oliver Lukas Dozae Nnonyelu Dovin
- Date of birth: 11 July 2002 (age 24)
- Place of birth: London, England
- Height: 1.87 m (6 ft 2 in)
- Position: Goalkeeper

Team information
- Current team: Coventry City
- Number: 1

Youth career
- –2013: Enskede IK
- 2014–2019: Hammarby IF

Senior career*
Years	Team	Apps	(Gls)
2019–2024	Hammarby IF	85	(0)
2020	→ IK Frej (loan)	23	(0)
2022	→ Hammarby TFF (res.)	24	(0)
2024–	Coventry City	28	(0)
2026	→ Leyton Orient (loan)	0	(0)

International career^{‡}
2017–2019	Sweden U17	11	(0)
2019–2020	Sweden U19	2	(0)
2021–2024	Sweden U21	13	(0)
2023–	Sweden	2	(0)
- * Club domestic league appearances and goals as of 2 September 2026 ‡ National team caps and goals as of 20:09, 15 October 2024 (UTC)

Oliver Lukas Dozae Nnonyelu Dovin (born 11 July 2002) is a professional footballer who plays as a goalkeeper for Premier League club Coventry City. Born in England, he plays for the Sweden national team.

== Early life ==
Dovin was born in London, England, to a British Nigerian father and a Swedish mother. He moved to Stockholm, Sweden, together with his family at age one.

He began playing football as a youngster with local club Enskede IK. In 2014, at age 12, Dovin joined the youth academy of Allsvenskan club Hammarby IF.

== Club career ==
=== Hammarby IF ===
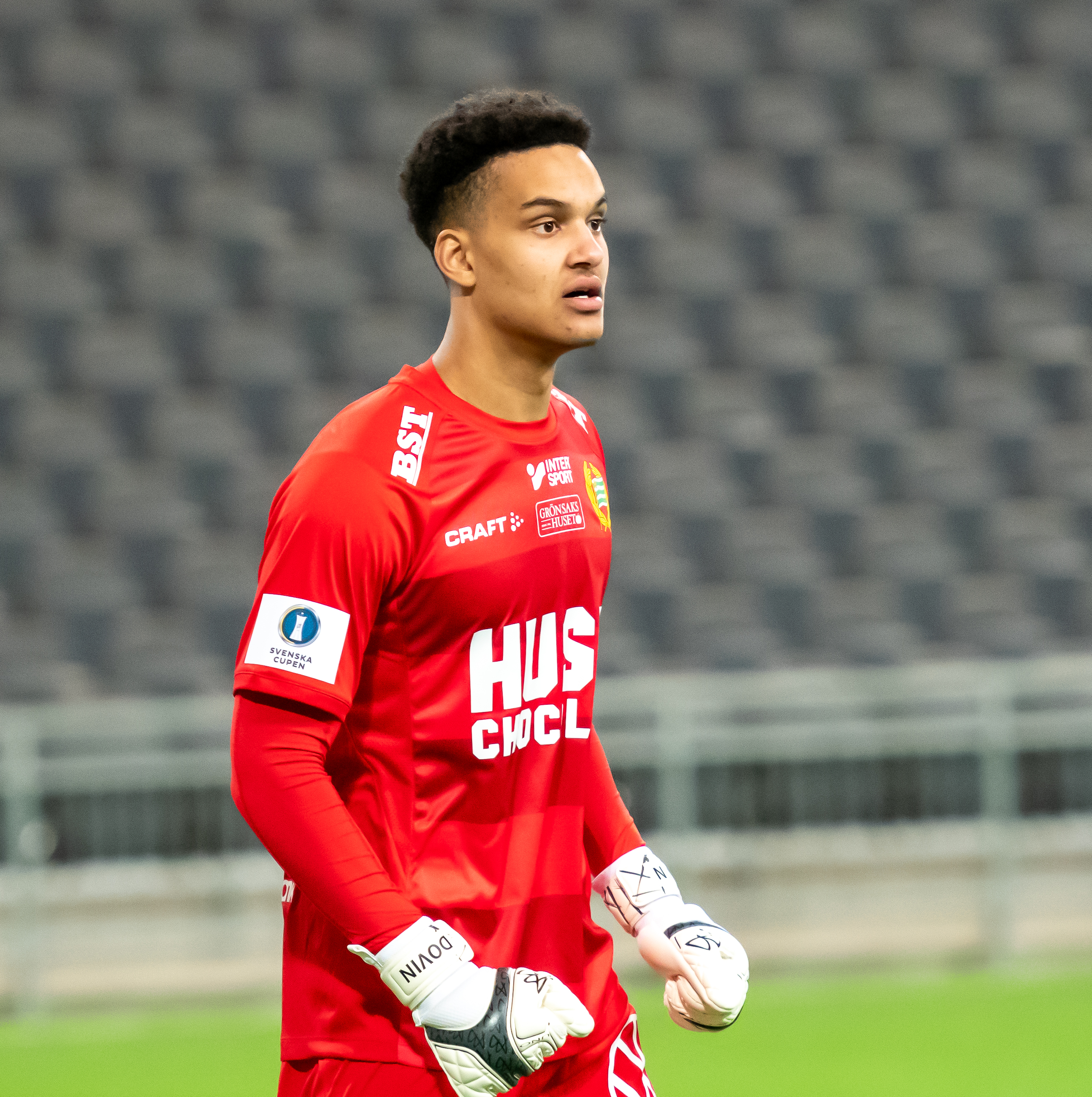
Dovin playing for Hammarby against Trelleborgs FF in a Svenska Cupen fixture in 2021

On 16 August 2018, Dovin signed his first professional contract with Hammarby running until the end of 2021. He appeared as an unused substitute in eight Allsvenskan fixtures in 2019, behind both Johan Wiland and Davor Blažević, as Hammarby finished 3rd in the table.

On 6 December 2020, Dovin made his senior debut in Allsvenskan, in a 1–2 away loss against Örebro SK, the last fixture of the season. He later signed a new long-term deal with Hammarby, running until the summer of 2024.

On 30 May 2021, Dovin won the 2020–21 Svenska Cupen, the main domestic cup, with Hammarby through a 5–4 win on penalties (0–0 after full-time) against BK Häcken in the final. Dovin made three appearances as the side reached the play-off round of the 2021–22 UEFA Europa Conference League, after eliminating Maribor (4–1 on aggregate) and FK Čukarički (6–4 on aggregate), where the club was knocked out by Basel on penalties (4–4 on aggregate). Throughout the season, Dovin made eight appearances in Allsvenskan, competing with David Ousted.

In 2022, Dovin started the year as Hammarby's first choice goalkeeper, but ended the season making 17 league appearances due to injuries. He helped his side to reach a 3rd place in the Allsvenskan table.

On 17 March 2023, Dovin signed a new three-and-a-half-year contract with Hammarby, running until the summer of 2026. Throughout the 2023 season, he made 29 league appearances in Allsvenskan, although Hammarby disappointedly finished 7th in the table.

=== Coventry City ===
In July 2024, Dovin signed for English club Coventry City. In March 2025, Dovin suffered an anterior cruciate ligament injury in an EFL Championship game against Sheffield United.

==== Leyton Orient (loan) ====
On 1 September 2026, he joined EFL League One club Leyton Orient on a season-long loan, however, on 25 September 2026, Dovin returned to Coventry City after just one game for Leyton Orient, following a shoulder injury sustained in a 2–1 loss against Arsenal under-21's in the EFL Trophy.

== International career ==
Dovin was part of the Swedish squad for the 2019 UEFA European Under-17 Championship, where he made 30 saves across three games (the best record among goalkeepers in the whole tournament). On 3 June 2021, Dovin made his debut for the Swedish U21's, playing one half in a 2–0 friendly win against Finland. He made his full international debut for Sweden on 12 January 2023, appearing in the second half as a replacement for Jacob Widell Zetterström in a friendly 2–1 win against Iceland. Thus, Dovin also became the first goalkeeper born in the 21st century to represent the Sweden national team.

== Career statistics ==
=== Club ===
As of match played 28 March 2025

Appearances and goals by club, season and competition
Club	Season	League			National cup (Note: Includes Svenska Cupen, FA Cup)		League cup		Europe		Other		Total	
Club	Season	Division	Apps	Goals	Apps	Goals	Apps	Goals	Apps	Goals	Apps	Goals	Apps	Goals
Hammarby IF	2019	Allsvenskan	0	0	0	0	—		—		—		0	0
Hammarby IF	2020	Allsvenskan	1	0	0	0	—		0	0	—		1	0
Hammarby IF	2021	Allsvenskan	8	0	2	0	—		3 (Note: Appearances in UEFA Europa Conference League)	0	—		13	0
Hammarby IF	2022	Allsvenskan	17	0	4	0	—		—		—		21	0
Hammarby IF	2023	Allsvenskan	29	0	4	0	—		2	0	—		35	0
Hammarby IF	2024	Allsvenskan	13	0	2	0	—		—		—		15	0
Hammarby IF	Total		56	0	12	0	—		5	0	—		73	0
IK Frej (loan)	2020	Ettan	23	0	0	0	—		—		—		23	0
Hammarby TFF (loan)	2022	Ettan	1	0	0	0	—		—		—		1	0
Coventry City	2024–25	Championship	28	0	2	0	0	0	—		0	0	30	0
Coventry City	2025–26	Championship	0	0	0	0	0	0	—		—		0	0
Coventry City	2026–27	Premier League	0	0	0	0	0	0	—		—		0	0
Coventry City	Total		28	0	2	0	0	0	—		—		30	0
Career total			120	0	14	0	0	0	5	0	0	0	139	0

=== International ===
Appearances and goals by national team and year
National team	Year	Apps	Goals
Sweden	2023	1	0
Sweden	2024	1	0
Total		2	0

== Honours ==
Hammarby IF

- Svenska Cupen: 2020–21

Coventry City

- EFL Championship: 2025–26
