= Rasmus Cronvall =

Swedish footballer

Personal information
- Full name: Bengt Ingemar Rasmus Cronvall
- Date of birth: 20 March 2002 (age 24)
- Height: 1.75 m (5 ft 9 in)
- Position: Forward

Team information
- Current team: Oskarshamns AIK
- Number: 21

Senior career*
Years	Team	Apps	(Gls)
2018–2019	Varbergs GIF	41	(22)
2020–2024	Varbergs BoIS	7	(0)
2020	→ Varbergs GIF (loan)	12	(10)
2021	→ Tvååkers IF (loan)	18	(3)
2021	→ Ullareds IK (loan)	5	(0)
2022	→ Tvååkers IF (loan)	12	(0)
2022–2024	→ Varbergs GIF (loan)	58	(36)
2025–	Oskarshamns AIK	8	(2)
- * Club domestic league appearances and goals as of 24 November 2025

Rasmus Cronvall (born 20 March 2002) is a Swedish professional footballer who plays as a forward for Oskarshamns AIK.
