= Aziz Ouattara Mohammed =

Ivorian footballer (born 2001)

Personal information
- Date of birth: 4 January 2001 (age 25)
- Place of birth: Abidjan, Ivory Coast
- Height: 1.89 m (6 ft 2 in)
- Positions: Centre-back; central midfielder

Team information
- Current team: Maccabi Netanya
- Number: 32

Youth career
- 2017–2019: ASEC Mimosas
- 2019: → Hammarby IF (loan)
- 2019–2020: Hammarby IF

Senior career*
Years	Team	Apps	(Gls)
2020–2022	Hammarby IF	24	(2)
2020	→ IK Frej (loan)	26	(2)
2022–2025	Genk	40	(2)
2022–2023	→ Jong Genk	9	(0)
2024–2025	→ KV Mechelen (loan)	26	(0)
2025–	Maccabi Netanya	26	(1)

International career^{‡}
2023	Ivory Coast U23	1	(0)
- * Club domestic league appearances and goals as of 9 September 2025 ‡ National team caps and goals as of 22 March 2023

Aziz Ouattara Mohammed (born 4 January 2001) is an Ivorian professional footballer who plays as a centre-back or central midfielder for Maccabi Netanya in the Israeli Premier League.

== Early life ==
Ouattara was born in the Ivorian capital Abidjan. At age three, Ouattara moved to his grandmother in the neighboring country Ghana, where he mostly grew up. At age 15, he moved back to Abidjan and started to play football in the youth academy of local club ASEC Mimosas.

== Club career ==
=== Hammarby IF ===
On 23 May 2019, Ouattara joined Swedish side Hammarby IF on loan, alongside ASEC teammate Bayéré Junior Loué, after a successful trial. Their chief scout Mikael Hjelmberg compared his playing style to that of compatriot Odilon Kossounou, who just had been sold for a club record fee to Club Brugge. Both Ouattara and Loué completed a permanent transfer to Hammarby IF on 30 December 2019, signing four-year deals with the club. In 2020, Ouattara went on loan to Hammarby's affiliated club IK Frej in Ettan, Sweden's third tier. He played 26 league games, and scored twice, as the side finished 9th in the table.

On 1 April 2021, Ouattara made his competitive debut for Hammarby IF against Trelleborgs FF in the quarter-final of the Svenska Cupen, the main domestic cup. His side won 3–2 after extra time, with Ouattara coming on as a half-time substitute. Three days later, Ouattara started and scored the only goal in a 1–0 win against rivals Djurgårdens IF in the semi-final. On 30 May 2021, Ouattara won the 2020–21 Svenska Cupen with Hammarby IF, through a 5–4 win on penalties (0–0 after full-time) against BK Häcken in the final. He featured in four games as the side reached the play-off round of the 2021–22 UEFA Europa Conference League, after eliminating Maribor (4–1 on aggregate) and FK Čukarički (6–4 on aggregate), where the club was knocked out by Basel (4–4 on aggregate) after a penalty shoot-out, although Ouattara scored in the second leg at home. Following his performances in 2021, Ouattara reportedly attracted interest from other clubs, such as Rennes and Bordeaux in the French Ligue 1, as well as from Al Ain in the UAE Pro League.

=== Genk ===
On 7 January 2022, Ouattara completed a transfer to Belgian Pro League club Genk, signing a contract until the summer of 2026. The transfer fee was reportedly set at around 30 million SEK (€2.9 million at that time). In July 2024, Ouattara signed a one-season loan with fellow Pro League club KV Mechelen.

== Career statistics ==
=== Club ===
As of 4 December 2021

Appearances and goals by club, season and competition
Club	Season	League			National cup		Continental		Total	
Club	Season	Division	Apps	Goals	Apps	Goals	Apps	Goals	Apps	Goals
IK Frej (loan)	2020	Ettan	26	2	0	0	–		26	2
Hammarby IF	2021	Allsvenskan	24	2	4	1	4 (Note: Appearances in UEFA Europa Conference League)	1	32	4
Career total			50	4	4	1	4	1	58	6

== Honours ==
Hammarby IF

- Svenska Cupen: 2020–21
