= Johan Lassagård =

Swedish footballer

Personal information
- Date of birth: 22 June 1994 (age 32)
- Place of birth: Sweden
- Height: 1.85 m (6 ft 1 in)
- Position: Midfielder

Team information
- Current team: IFK Värnamo
- Number: 9

Youth career
- Vinbergs IF

Senior career*
Years	Team	Apps	(Gls)
2010–2016	Vinbergs IF	120	(16)
2017–2019	Falkenbergs FF	14	(0)
2019	→ IFK Värnamo (loan)	14	(3)
2020–	IFK Värnamo	27	(7)
- * Club domestic league appearances and goals as of 19:04, 28 December 2020 (UTC)

Johan Lassagård (born 22 June 1994) is a Swedish footballer who plays for IFK Värnamo.
