= Passi Prudence =

Swedish footballer

Personal information
- Full name: Herve Patient Prudence Nshimirimana
- Date of birth: 15 August 1999 (age 27)
- Place of birth: Burundi
- Height: 1.99 m (6 ft 6 in)
- Position: Midfielder

Team information
- Current team: Landskrona BoIS
- Number: 5

Youth career
- Bjuvs IF
- Billesholms GIF
- Högaborg

Senior career*
Years	Team	Apps	(Gls)
2015–2016	Högaborg		
2017–2019	Falkenbergs FF	6	(0)
2018	→ Tvååkers IF (loan)	1	(0)
2019	→ Eskilsminne IF (loan)	14	(0)
2020–	Landskrona BoIS	0	(0)
- * Club domestic league appearances and goals as of 16:48, 30 November 2019 (UTC)

Herve Patient Prudence Nshimirimana (born 15 August 1999) is a Swedish footballer who plays for Landskrona BoIS.

== Career ==
=== Club career ===
Prudence started playing football at the age of 10 at Bjuvs IF. He soon joined Billesholms GIF, before moving to Högaborgs BK. He got his first team debut for Högaborgs BK in 2015.

On 5 December 2019 it was confirmed, that Prudence would join Landskrona BoIS for the 2020 season, signing a deal until the end of 2021.

== Personal life ==
Born in Sweden, Prudence is of Burundian descent.
