= Herman Hallberg =

Swedish footballer

Personal information
- Full name: Herman Hallberg
- Date of birth: 22 May 1997 (age 29)
- Place of birth: Kalmar, Sweden
- Height: 1.80 m (5 ft 11 in)
- Position: Midfielder

Team information
- Current team: Oskarshamns AIK
- Number: 5

Youth career
- Möre BK
- 2009–2015: Kalmar FF

Senior career*
Years	Team	Apps	(Gls)
2016–2019	Kalmar FF	71	(3)
2020–2024	Trelleborgs FF	66	(4)
2025–	Oskarshamns AIK	22	(0)

International career
2016	Sweden U19	2	(2)
2017	Sweden U21	1	(0)
- * Club domestic league appearances and goals as of 24 November 2025

Herman Hallberg (born 22 May 1997) is a Swedish footballer who plays for Oskarshamns AIK. He's the younger brother of footballer Melker Hallberg.
