= Davor Blažević =

Swedish footballer (born 1993)

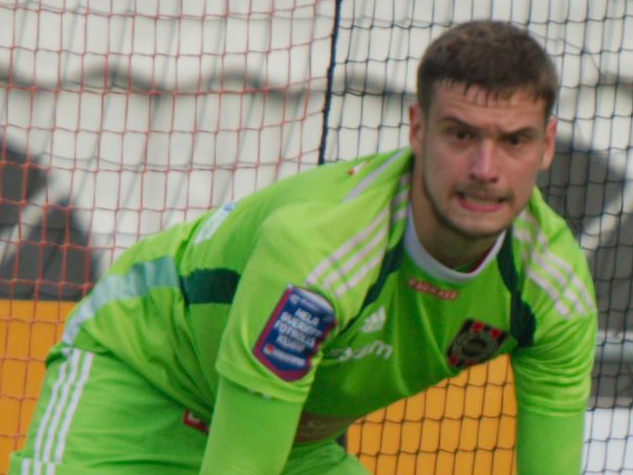

Personal information
- Full name: Davor Blažević
- Date of birth: 7 February 1993 (age 33)
- Place of birth: Falun, Sweden
- Height: 1.90 m (6 ft 3 in)
- Position: Goalkeeper

Team information
- Current team: IF Brommapojkarna
- Number: 25

Youth career
- –2005: Assyriska FF
- 2005–2009: IF Brommapojkarna

Senior career*
Years	Team	Apps	(Gls)
2010–2015	IF Brommapojkarna	40	(0)
2010	→ Gröndals IK (loan)	13	(0)
2016	AFC United	0	(0)
2017	Assyriska FF	9	(0)
2018–2024	Hammarby IF	41	(0)
2021	→ GIF Sundsvall (loan)	11	(0)
2025–	IF Brommapojkarna	14	(0)

International career
2009–2010	Sweden U17	9	(0)
2010–2012	Sweden U19	11	(0)
2012	Sweden U21	1	(0)
- * Club domestic league appearances and goals as of 12 November 2025

Davor Blažević (born 7 February 1993) is a Swedish footballer who plays as a goalkeeper for Allsvenskan club IF Brommapojkarna.

== Early life ==
Blažević was born in Falun, Sweden, to parents from Bosnia and Herzegovina. He grew up in Södertälje and started playing football with local club Assyriska FF as a youngster, before joining the academy of IF Brommapojkarna in 2005.

== Club career ==
=== Brommapojkarna ===
In 2010, Blažević was promoted to Brommapojkarna's first team in Allsvenskan, acting as a back-up to Kristoffer Nordfeldt when the club was relegated from the top tier.

In 2011, Blažević made his senior debut for Brommapojkarna in Superettan, Sweden's second division, making two league appearances. In 2012, he played two league games as Brommapojkarna secured a promotion, finishing 2nd in the Superettan table. Blažević was sidelined throughout the whole 2013 season, due to a cruciate ligament injury.

In 2014, Blažević played 18 league games for Brommapojkarna in Allsvenskan, although the club finished 16th and last in the table, only claiming 12 points in 30 games. Blažević also competed with Brommapojkarna in the 2014–15 UEFA Europa League, eliminating VPS and Crusaders in the first two qualifying rounds. He featured in both legs against the Serie A side Torino in the third qualifying round, when the club was eliminated through 0–7 on aggregate.

In 2015, Brommapojkarna suffered a second consecutive relegation, finishing 16th and last in the Superettan table. Blazevic made 18 league appearances throughout the campaign, but left the club at the end of the year.

=== AFC and Assyriska ===
In April 2016, Blažević was close to joining Jönköpings Södra in Superettan due to an emergency crisis, but the deal fell through after the Swedish Football Association did not grant an exemption outside of the transfer window.

On 2 August 2016, Blažević joined AFC United. He acted as a back-up to Josh Wicks during the second half of the season, as the club finished 2nd in Superettan and won a promotion to Allsvenskan.

On 20 March 2017, Blažević returned to his youth club Assyriska FF, competing in the third tier Ettan. He only made nine league appearances for the side, that finished mid-table, and left at the end of the year.

=== Hammarby IF ===
On 14 February 2018, after a successful trial, Blažević signed a short term-deal with Hammarby IF in Allsvenskan. On 25 June the same year, he signed a new one-and-a-half-year contract with the club. He played the last five league games of the season, after first choice goalkeeper Johan Wiland went under the knife due to a shoulder injury.

In 2019, Blažević mainly served as a backup to both Gianluca Curci and Johan Wiland, but still ended the season making 13 league appearances in total. With Blažević between the sticks, Hammarby made a strong finish to the season (with five straight wins between match day 25 and 30) and ultimately finished 3rd in the Allsvenskan table. On 25 October the same year, Blažević signed a new three-year contract with Hammarby, running until the end of 2022.

On 24 March 2021, Blažević was sent on a three-month loan to GIF Sundsvall in Superettan, Sweden's second tier.

Blažević featured in the final of the 2021–22 Svenska Cupen, in which Hammarby lost by 4–5 on penalties to Malmö FF after the game ended in a 0–0 draw. On 13 September 2022, Blažević signed a new three-year contract with Hammarby, with an option for a further.

=== Brommapojkarna ===
By late 2024, Blažević was no longer a part of Hammarby's plans and returned to Brommapojkarna for the 2025 season.

== Career statistics ==
=== Club ===
As of 20 August 2023

Appearances and goals by club, season and competition
Club	Season	League			Cup		Continental		Other		Total	
Club	Season	Division	Apps	Goals	Apps	Goals	Apps	Goals	Apps	Goals	Apps	Goals
Gröndals IK (loan)	2010	Division 1	13	0	0	0	—		—		13	0
IF Brommapojkarna	2011	Superettan	2	0	3	0	—		—		5	0
IF Brommapojkarna	2012	Superettan	2	0	1	0	—		—		3	0
IF Brommapojkarna	2013	Allsvenskan	0	0	0	0	—		—		0	0
IF Brommapojkarna	2014	Superettan	18	0	1	0	6 (Note: Appearances in UEFA Europa League)	0	—		25	0
IF Brommapojkarna	2015	Superettan	18	0	3	0	—		—		21	0
Total			53	0	8	0	6	0	0	0	67	0
AFC United	2016	Superettan	0	0	1	0	—		—		1	0
Assyriska FF	2017	Division 1	10	0	0	0	—		—		0	0
Total			10	0	1	0	0	0	0	0	11	0
Hammarby IF	2018	Allsvenskan	5	0	1	0	—		—		6	0
Hammarby IF	2019	Allsvenskan	13	0	3	0	—		—		16	0
Hammarby IF	2020	Allsvenskan	4	0	3	0	0	0	—		7	0
GIF Sundsvall (loan)	2021	Superettan	11	0	0	0	—		—		11	0
Hammarby IF	2021	Allsvenskan	1	0	1	0	0	0	—		2	0
Hammarby IF	2022	Allsvenskan	14	0	3	0	—		—		17	0
Hammarby IF	2023	Allsvenskan	2	0	2	0	0	0	—		4	0
Total			50	0	13	0	0	0	0	0	63	0
Career total			113	0	22	0	6	0	0	0	141	0
