= Bayéré Junior Loué =

Ivorian footballer

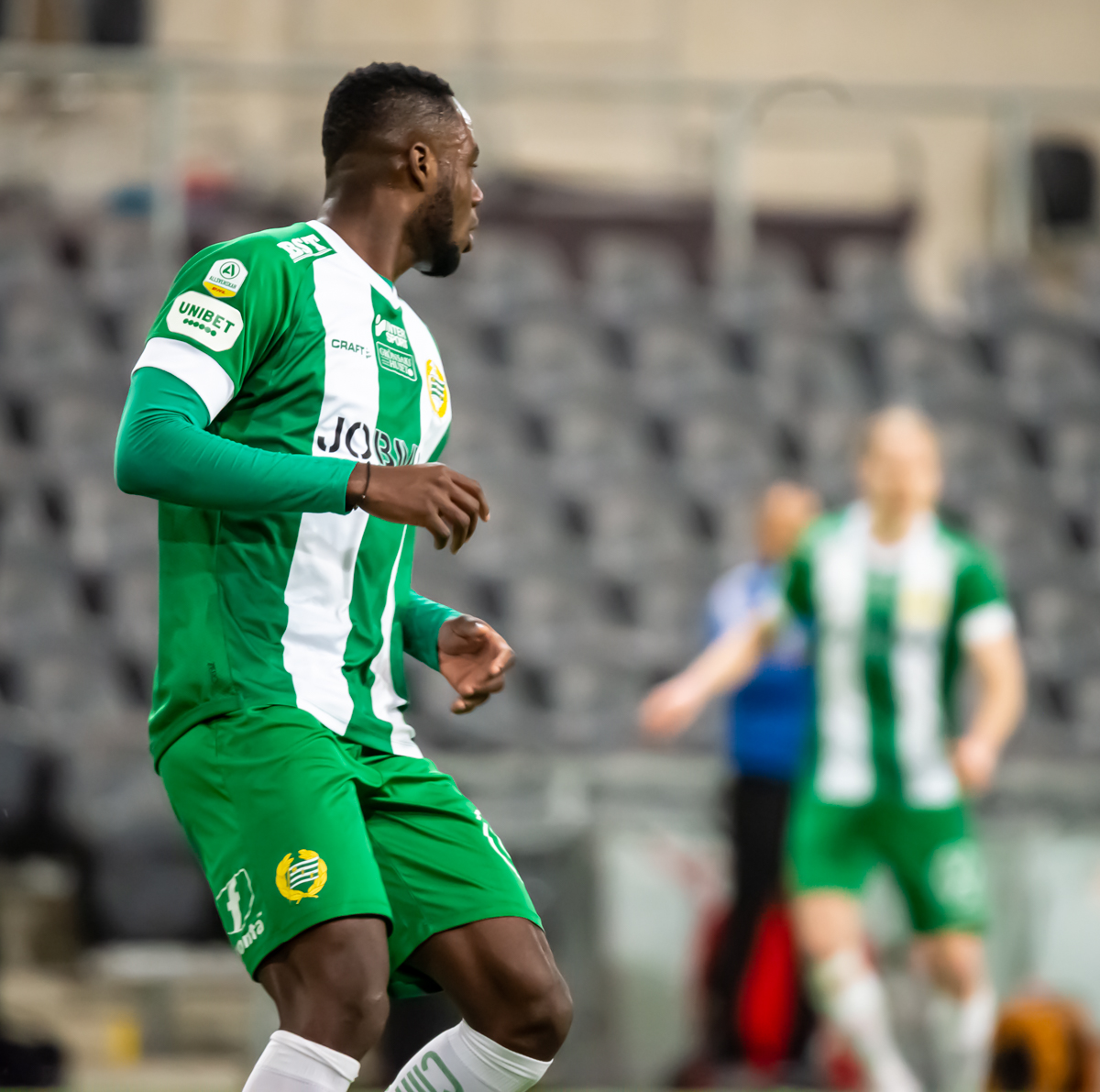
- Loué with Hammarby IF in 2021.

Personal information
- Date of birth: 14 January 2001 (age 25)
- Place of birth: Abidjan, Ivory Coast
- Height: 1.88 m (6 ft 2 in)
- Position: Forward

Team information
- Current team: Zira

Youth career
- Espérance de Tunis
- Olympique Sport d’Abobos
- –2019: ASEC Mimosas
- 2019–2020: Hammarby IF

Senior career*
Years	Team	Apps	(Gls)
2020–2023	Hammarby IF	5	(0)
2020	→ IK Frej (loan)	4	(0)
2021	→ Železničar Pančevo (loan)	16	(2)
2022	→ Hammarby TFF (loan)	19	(3)
2023	→ Göztepe (loan)	5	(1)
2023–2026	Javor Ivanjica	77	(15)
2026–	Zira	0	(0)
- * Club domestic league appearances and goals as of 13 June 2026

Bayéré Junior Loué (born 14 January 2001) is an Ivorian footballer who plays as a forward for Azerbaijan Premier League club Zira.

== Early life ==
Loué was born in Abidjan, Ivory Coast, but grew up in Tunisia where he started to play football at age nine with Espérance de Tunis. He later moved back to his native country, where he represented local club Olympique Sport d’Abobos before joining the prestigious academy of ASEC Mimosas in his teens.

== Club career ==
On 23 May 2019, Loué joined Swedish side Hammarby IF on loan, together with ASEC teammate Aziz Ouattara Mohammed, after a successful trial. Both players completed a permanent transfer on 30 December the same year, signing four-year deals with the club.

In 2020, Loué went on loan to Hammarby's affiliated club IK Frej in Ettan, Sweden's third tier. He spent the vast majority of the season nursing a knee and thigh injury, and ultimately played four league games as the club finished 9th in the table.

On 20 February 2021, Loué made his competitive debut for Hammarby, in a 4–1 home win against AFC Eskilstuna, in the group stage of the main domestic cup, Svenska Cupen. On 30 May 2021, Loué won the 2020–21 Svenska Cupen with Hammarby, through a 5–4 win on penalties (0–0 after full-time) against BK Häcken in the final. In total, he made five Allsvenskan appearances for the side in 2021.

On 15 September 2021, Loué was sent on loan to Železničar Pančevo in the Serbian First League for the remainder of the year. He returned to Sweden in 2022, being sent on loan to affiliated club Hammarby TFF in Ettan, scoring three goals in 19 appearances.

On 8 February 2023, Loué joined Göztepe, competing in the Turkish second tier TFF First League, on loan from Hammarby.

On 13 August 2023, Loué completed a permanent transfer to Javor Ivanjica in the Serbian SuperLiga, signing a three-and-a-half-year contract.

On 21 July 2026, Loué signed a two-year contract with Azerbaijan Premier League club Zira FK.

== Personal life ==
He is the son of former professional footballer Edgar Loué.

== Career statistics ==
As of 17 August 2023

Club	Season	League			Cup		Continental		Total	
Club	Season	Division	Apps	Goals	Apps	Goals	Apps	Goals	Apps	Goals
IK Frej (loan)	2020	Ettan	4	0	0	0	—		4	0
Hammarby IF	2021	Allsvenskan	5	0	2	0	1 (Note: Appearances in UEFA Europa Conference League)	0	8	0
Železničar Pančevo (loan)	2021–22	Serbian First League	16	2	1	0	—		17	2
Hammarby TFF (loan)	2022	Ettan	19	3	0	0	—		19	3
Göztepe (loan)	2022–23	1. Lig	5	1	0	0	—		5	1
Career total			49	6	3	0	1	0	53	6

== Honours ==
Hammarby IF

- Svenska Cupen: 2020–21
