= Varbergs GIF =

Association football club in Sweden

Varbergs GIF FK
- Full name: Varbergs Gymnastik- och Idrottsförening Fotbollsklubb
- Founded: 1905; 121 years ago
- Ground: Påskbergsvallen; Varberg; Sweden
- Capacity: 4,500
- League: Division 3 Sydvästra Götaland
- 2019: Division 3 Sydvästra Götaland, 1st (Promoted)
- Website: varbergsgif.se
Home colours

Varbergs GIF FK is a Swedish football club located in Varberg.

== Background ==
Varbergs Gymnastik- och Idrottsförening was formed on 28 May 1905 and shortly afterwards included football in their programme. In the same year the club became founder members of the Hallands Idrottsförbund (Halland Sports Federation) at the invitation of IF Kamraterna, Halmstad.

In the 1940s, the club also played bandy.

Varbergs GIF FF were declared bankrupt in December 2007 when their tax liabilities could not be met. As a consequence the club dropped out of Division 4 Halland and reformed in the bottom tier in Division 6 Halland Norra.

Varbergs GIF FK currently plays in Division 2 Västra Götaland which is the fourth tier of Swedish football. They play their home matches at the Påskbergsvallen in Varberg.

The club is affiliated to Hallands Fotbollförbund. Varbergs GIF have competed in the Svenska Cupen on 24 occasions and have played 40 matches in the competition.

== Season to season ==
Season	Level	Division	Section	Position	Movements
1993	Tier 5	Division 4	Halland	1st	Promoted
1994	Tier 4	Division 3	Sydvästra Götaland	6th	
1995	Tier 4	Division 3	Sydvästra Götaland	8th	
1996	Tier 4	Division 3	Sydvästra Götaland	6th	
1997	Tier 4	Division 3	Sydvästra Götaland	9th	Relegation Playoffs – Relegated
1998	Tier 5	Division 4	Halland	1st	Promoted
1999	Tier 4	Division 3	Sydvästra Götaland	2nd	
2000	Tier 4	Division 3	Sydvästra Götaland	8th	
2001	Tier 4	Division 3	Sydvästra Götaland	2nd	Promotion Playoffs
2002	Tier 4	Division 3	Sydvästra Götaland	3rd	
2003	Tier 4	Division 3	Sydvästra Götaland	3rd	
2004	Tier 4	Division 3	Mellersta Götaland	2nd	Promotion Playoffs
2005	Tier 4	Division 3	Sydvästra Götaland	4th	Playoffs
2006*	Tier 5	Division 3	Sydvästra Götaland	11th	Relegated
2007	Tier 6b	Division 4	Halland	2nd	Promotion Playoffs
2008	Tier 8	Division 6	Halland Norra	1st	Promoted
2009	Tier 7	Division 5	Halland Norra	1st	Promoted
2010	Tier 6b	Division 4	Halland	1st	Promoted
2011	Tier 6a	Division 4	Halland Elit	4th	
2012	Tier 6a	Division 4	Halland Elit	4th	
2013	Tier 6a	Division 4	Halland Elit	3rd	
2014	Tier 6a	Division 4	Halland Elit	5th	
2015	Tier 6a	Division 4	Halland Elit	2nd	Promotion Playoffs - Promoted
2016	Tier 5	Division 3	Sydvästra Götaland	2nd	Promotion Playoffs - Promoted
2017	Tier 4	Division 2	Västra Götaland	12th	Relegation Playoffs?
2018	Tier 4	Division 2	Västra Götaland	13th	Relegated
2019	Tier 5	Division 3	Sydvästra Götaland	1st	Promoted
2020	Tier 4	Division 2	Västra Götaland		

* League restructuring in 2006 resulted in a new division being created at Tier 3 and subsequent divisions dropping a level.
