= Adam Hellborg =

Swedish footballer

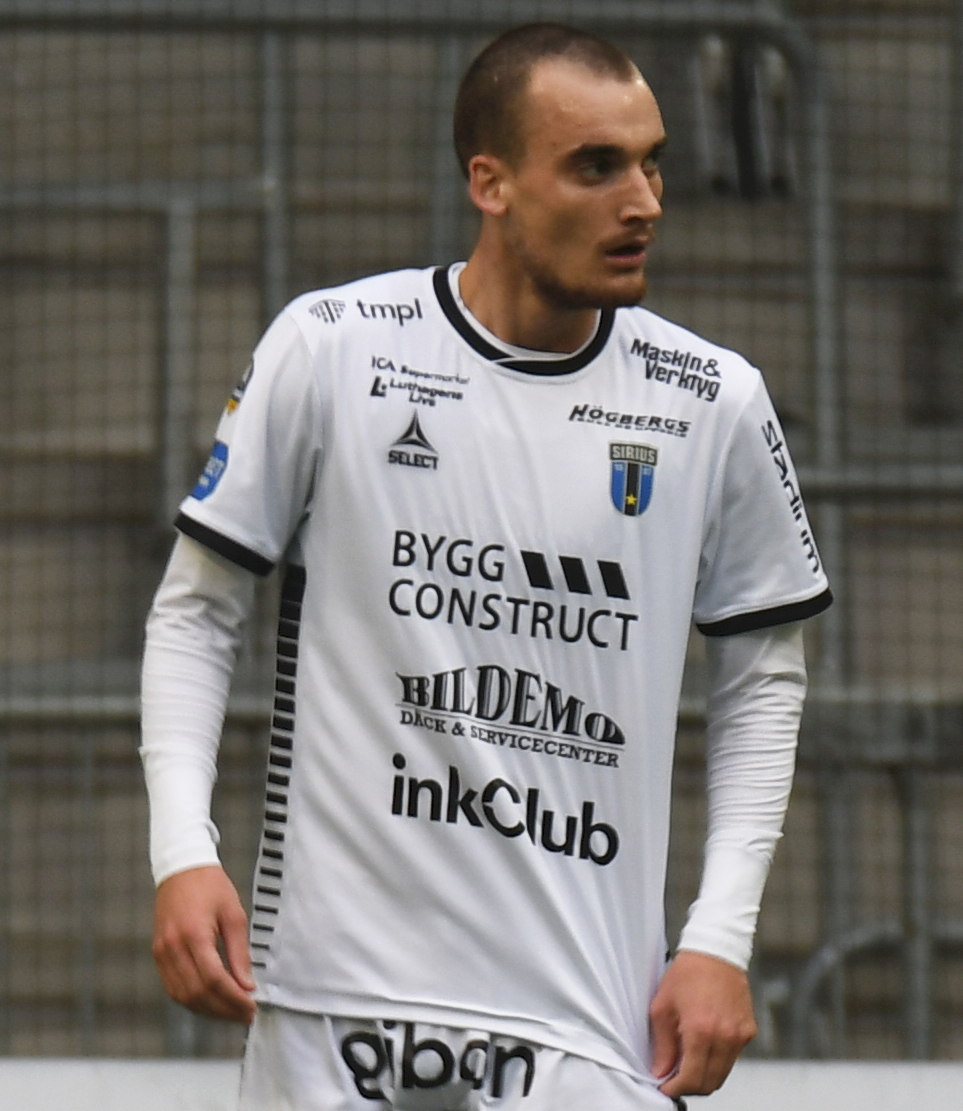

Personal information
- Date of birth: 30 July 1998 (age 28)
- Place of birth: Kiruna, Sweden
- Height: 1.88 m (6 ft 2 in)
- Position: Midfielder

Team information
- Current team: Oskarshamns AIK
- Number: 14

Youth career
- Emmaboda IS
- 2013–2018: Kalmar FF

Senior career*
Years	Team	Apps	(Gls)
2017–2019	Kalmar FF	9	(0)
2019	→ Oskarshamns AIK (loan)	18	(2)
2020–2022	IK Sirius	74	(4)
2023–2024	Helsingborg	46	(1)
2025–	Oskarshamns AIK	13	(2)

International career^{‡}
2013–2015	Sweden U17	16	(0)
2015	Sweden U19	2	(0)
2020	Sweden U21	2	(0)
- * Club domestic league appearances and goals as of 24 November 2025 ‡ National team caps and goals as of 18 November 2020

Adam Hellborg (born 30 July 1998) is a Swedish footballer who plays for Oskarshamns AIK.

== Career ==
=== Club career ===
Hellborg's career started at Emmaboda IS but already in his early teens, he moved to Kalmar FF. After being on the bench already during the previous season, Hellborg made his Allsvenskan debut in a 3–0 victory against Malmö FF on 29 April 29, 2018. He made a total of nine league appearances in 2018, including three from the start, and shortly after the season ended he signed a new two-year agreement with the club..

In April 2019, Hellborg was lent to Oskarshamns AIK through a cooperation agreement.

In December 2019, Hellborg was presented as a new player by IK Sirius.
