= Oskarshamns AIK =

Swedish football club

- Full name: Oskarshamns Allmänna Idrottsklubb
- Short name: OAIK
- Founded: September 1, 1922; 103 years ago
- Ground: Arena Oskarshamn, Oskarshamn, Sweden
- Capacity: 2,000
- Coach: Agim Hasani
- League: Ettan Fotboll
- 2025: Ettan Södra, 13th of 16
Home colours

Oskarshamns Allmänna Idrottsklubb, commonly known as Oskarshamns AIK or OAIK is a Swedish football club located in Oskarshamn, Kalmar County.

== Background ==
Oskarshamns Allmänna Idrottsklubb were formed on 1 September 1922.

Since their foundation Oskarshamns AIK has participated mainly in the middle divisions of the Swedish football league system. They play their home matches on artificial turf at the Arena Oskarshamn in Oskarshamn. The club also uses Ernemar IP.

Oskarshamns AIK are affiliated to Smålands Fotbollförbund.

The club reached the third-tier Division 1 in 2013, starting the 2014 in the league.

== Current squad ==
As of 1 September 2025

Note: Flags indicate national team as defined under FIFA eligibility rules; some limited exceptions apply. Players may hold more than one non-FIFA nationality.

No.	Pos.	Nation	Player
1	GK	USA	Michael Hartmann
2	DF	SWE	Max Högberg
3	DF	SWE	Måns Isaksson
4	DF	SWE	Yusuf Aksoy
5	MF	SWE	Herman Hallberg
6	DF	SWE	Oliver Blomdahl
7	FW	SWE	Leo Jonsson
8	MF	NGA	Olatomi Olaniyan
9	FW	SWE	Anton Nyholm
10	MF	PLE	Tarek Alnator
11	FW	SWE	Alexander Larsson
12	DF	SWE	Lucas Pettersson
13	DF	SWE	Filip Stenman

No.	Pos.	Nation	Player
14	MF	SWE	Adam Hellborg
15	FW	SWE	Ville Nilsson (on loan from Kalmar FF)
16	FW	RSA	Kgotso Masangane
17	DF	SWE	Arvin Davoudi-Kia (on loan from Kalmar FF)
17	DF	SWE	Arton Podrimcaku
19	DF	SWE	Gustav Arvidsson
20	DF	SWE	Sebastian Nilsson
21	FW	SWE	Rasmus Cronvall
27	MF	BRA	Renato
30	GK	SWE	Mirsad Besic (on loan from Östers IF)
40	GK	SWE	Leo Lindblom
77	MF	SWE	Ludvig Navik

== Recent history ==
In recent seasons Oskarshamns AIK have competed in the following divisions:

2020 – Division I, Södra
2019 – Division I, Södra
2018 – Division I, Södra
2017 – Division I, Södra
2016 – Division I, Södra
2015 – Division I, Södra
2014 – Division I, Södra
2013 – Division II, Södra Götaland
2012 – Division II, Östra Götaland
2011 – Division III, Sydöstra Götaland
2010 – Division III, Nordöstra Götaland
2009 – Division III, Sydöstra Götaland
2008 – Division III, Sydöstra Götaland
2007 – Division IV, Småland Östra Elit
2007 – Division IV, Småland Elit Södra
2006 – Division III, Sydöstra Götaland
2005 – Division II, Mellersta Götaland
2004 – Division II, Östra Götaland
2003 – Division III, Sydöstra Götaland
2002 – Division IV, Småland Östra Elit
2000 – Division IV, Småland Sydöstra
1999 – Division III, Nordöstra Götaland
1998 – Division III, Nordöstra Götaland
1997 – Division III, Nordöstra Götaland

== Attendances ==
In recent seasons Oskarshamns AIK have had the following average attendances:

Season	Average attendance	Division / Section	Level
2005	222	Div 2 Mellersta Götaland	Tier 3
2006	146	Div 3 Sydöstra Götaland	Tier 5
2007	Not available	Div 4 Småland Östra Elit	Tier 6
2008	166	Div 3 Sydöstra Götaland	Tier 5
2009	206	Div 3 Sydöstra Götaland	Tier 5
2010	197	Div 3 Nordöstra Götaland	Tier 5
2011	255	Div 3 Sydöstra Götaland	Tier 5
2012	414	Div 2 Östra Götaland	Tier 4
2013	413	Div 2 Södra Götaland	Tier 4
2014	408	Div 1 Södra	Tier 3
2015	482	Div 1 Södra	Tier 3
2016	332	Div 1 Södra	Tier 3
2017	348	Div 1 Södra	Tier 3
2018	432	Div 1 Södra	Tier 3
2019	314	Div 1 Södra	Tier 3
2020		Div 1 Södra	Tier 3

* Attendances are provided in the Publikliga sections of the Svenska Fotbollförbundet website.
