= 2019 Djurgårdens IF season =

Djurgårdens IF Fotboll
2019 season
- Chairman: Lars-Erik Sjöberg
- Manager: Kim Bergstrand; Thomas Lagerlöf
- Stadium: Tele2 Arena
- Allsvenskan: 1st
- 2018–19 Svenska Cupen: Semi-final
- 2019–20 Svenska Cupen: Group stage (continued in 2020)
- Top goalscorer: League: Mohamed Buya Turay (15); All: Mohamed Buya Turay (16)
- Highest home attendance: 28,258 (28 October vs. Örebro SK, Allsvenskan)
- Average home league attendance: 15,958 (Allsvenskan)
Home colours	Away colours	Third colours

The 2019 season was Djurgårdens IF's 119th in existence, their 64th season in Allsvenskan and their 19th consecutive season in the league. They competed in Allsvenskan and the 2018–19 and 2019–20 editions of the Svenska Cupen.

Djurgården secured their 12th league title, and the first in 14 years, with a 2–2 draw away at IFK Norrköping in the last league game of the season after being down 0–2 at half-time, in a league battle that also featured Malmö FF and Hammarby IF all the way to the final day.

== Squad ==
As it stands on 12 December 2019

Squad No.	Name	Nationality	Position(s)	Date of birth (age)	Apps	Goals	Previous club
Goalkeepers
12	Per Kristian Bråtveit	(Norway)	GK	15 February 1996 (age 30)	16	0	(Norway) Haugesund
30	Tommi Vaiho	(Sweden) (Finland)	GK	13 September 1988 (age 38)	56	0	(Sweden) GAIS
35	Jacob Widell Zetterström	(Sweden)	GK	11 July 1998 (age 28)	0	0	(Sweden) IFK Lidingö
37	Benjamin Machini	(United States) (Sweden)	GK	11 September 1996 (age 30)	0	0	(Spain) Burgos
Defenders
3	Marcus Danielson (captain)	(Sweden)	CB	8 April 1990 (age 36)	63	9	(Sweden) GIF Sundsvall
4	Jacob Une Larsson	(Sweden)	CB	8 April 1994 (age 32)	111	8	(Sweden) Brommapojkarna
5	Elliot Käck	(Sweden)	LB	18 September 1989 (age 36)	122	1	(Norway) Start
15	Jonathan Augustinsson	(Sweden)	LB/CB	30 March 1996 (age 30)	62	2	(Sweden) Brommapojkarna
16	Aslak Fonn Witry	(Norway)	RB	10 February 1996 (age 30)	29	4	(Norway) Ranheim
21	Erik Berg	(Sweden)	CB	30 December 1988 (age 37)	24	2	(Denmark) Copenhagen
28	Alexander Abrahamsson	(Sweden)	CB	7 August 1999 (age 27)	2	0	Youth System
Midfielders
6	Jesper Karlström	(Sweden)	CM	23 October 1993 (age 32)	144	12	(Sweden) Brommapojkarna
8	Kevin Walker	(Sweden) (Republic of Ireland)	CM	21 July 1989 (age 37)	139	15	(Sweden) GIF Sundsvall
9	Haris Radetinac	(Bosnia and Herzegovina)	RW/RB	28 October 1985 (age 40)	135	17	(Sweden) Mjällby
10	Astrit Ajdarević	(Albania) (Sweden)	CM	17 April 1990 (age 36)	28	0	(Greece) AEK Athens
11	Jonathan Ring	(Sweden)	LW/RW	5 December 1991 (age 34)	70	12	(Sweden) Kalmar FF
17	Hampus Finndell	(Sweden)	CM	6 June 2000 (age 26)	6	0	(Netherlands) Groningen
18	Edward Chilufya	(Zambia)	RW/LW/ST	17 September 1999 (age 26)	23	2	(Zambia) Mpande Academy
19	Nicklas Bärkroth	(Sweden)	RW/LW	19 January 1992 (age 34)	37	3	(Poland) Lech Poznań
23	Fredrik Ulvestad	(Norway)	CM	19 May 1992 (age 34)	63	6	(England) Burnley
24	Curtis Edwards	(England)	CM	12 January 1994 (age 32)	13	1	(Sweden) Östersunds FK
Forwards
20	Emir Kujović	(Sweden) (Montenegro)	ST	22 June 1988 (age 38)	10	4	(Germany) Fortuna Düsseldorf
22	Adam Bergmark Wiberg	(Sweden)	ST	7 May 1997 (age 29)	11	0	(Sweden) Gefle IF
29	Oscar Pettersson	(Sweden)	ST	1 February 2000 (age 26)	4	1	Youth System
77	Mohamed Buya Turay	(Sierra Leone)	ST	10 January 1995 (age 31)	31	16	(Belgium) Sint-Truiden (loan)

=== Out on loan ===
Note: Flags indicate national team as defined under FIFA eligibility rules; some limited exceptions apply. Players may hold more than one non-FIFA nationality.

No.	Pos.	Nation	Player
2	DF	SWE	Johan Andersson (on loan at Karlstad BK until 31 December 2019)
7	MF	SWE	Dženis Kozica (on loan at AFC Eskilstuna until 31 December 2019)
14	MF	MKD	Besard Sabovic (on loan at Dalkurd FF until 31 December 2019)

No.	Pos.	Nation	Player
16	MF	SWE	Joseph Ceesay (on loan at Dalkurd FF until 31 December 2019)
19	DF	SWE	Marcus Hansson (on loan at IF Brommapojkarna until 31 December 2019)

== Transfers ==
=== In ===
Date	Position	Nationality	Name	From	Fee	Ref.
19 December 2019	GK	(Norway)	Per Kristian Bråtveit	Haugesund	Undisclosed	
20 December 2019	DF	(Norway)	Aslak Fonn Witry	Ranheim	Undisclosed	
8 January 2019	DF	(Sweden)	Elliot Käck	IK Start	Undisclosed	
9 February 2019	MF	(Albania)	Astrit Ajdarević	AEK Athens	Undisclosed	
31 July 2019	MF	(England)	Curtis Edwards	Östersunds FK	Undisclosed	
13 August 2019	FW	(Sweden)	Emir Kujović	Fortuna Düsseldorf	Undisclosed	

=== Loans in ===
Start date	Position	Nationality	Name	From	End date	Ref.
9 January 2019	FW	(Sierra Leone)	Mohamed Buya Turay	Sint-Truiden	End of Season	

=== Out ===
Date	Position	Nationality	Name	To	Fee	Ref.
6 February 2019	FW	(Senegal)	Aliou Badji	Rapid Wien	Undisclosed	
1 March 2019	DF	(Norway)	Niklas Gunnarsson	Palermo	Undisclosed	
11 June 2019	MF	(South Africa)	Mihlali Mayambela	Farense	Undisclosed	
1 July 2019	DF	(Ivory Coast)	Souleymane Kone	Westerlo	Undisclosed	

=== Loans out ===
Start date	Position	Nationality	Name	To	End date	Ref.
19 July 2018	MF	(South Africa)	Mihlali Mayambela	Farense	19 July 2019	
7 January 2019	DF	(Sweden)	Johan Andersson	Karlstad BK	End of Season	
12 January 2019	DF	(Ivory Coast)	Souleymane Kone	DAC Dunajská Streda	15 July 2019	
28 January 2019	MF	(Sweden)	Joseph Ceesay	Dalkurd	End of Season	
29 March 2019	MF	(North Macedonia)	Besard Sabovic	Dalkurd	End of Season	
11 July 2019	MF	(Sweden)	Dženis Kozica	AFC Eskilstuna	End of Season	
31 July 2019	DF	(Sweden)	Marcus Hansson	IF Brommapojkarna	End of Season	

=== Released ===
Date	Position	Nationality	Name	Joined	Date
31 December 2018	GK	(Sweden)	Andreas Isaksson	Retired	
31 December 2018	GK	(Sweden)	Oscar Jonsson	Karlstad	22 January 2019
31 December 2018	DF	(Sweden)	Jonas Olsson	Wigan Athletic	1 February 2019
31 December 2018	MF	(Sweden)	Kerim Mrabti	Birmingham City	18 January 2019
31 December 2018	MF	(Sweden)	Omar Eddahri	GIF Sundsvall	
31 December 2018	FW	(The Gambia)	Amadou Jawo	Brottby SK	

== Competitions ==
=== Allsvenskan ===
==== League table ====
Pos	Team	Pld	W	D	L	GF	GA	GD	Pts	Qualification or relegation
1	Djurgårdens IF (C)	30	20	6	4	53	19	+34	66	Qualification for the Champions League first qualifying round
2	Malmö FF	30	19	8	3	56	16	+40	65	Qualification for the Europa League first qualifying round
3	Hammarby IF	30	20	5	5	75	38	+37	65	Qualification for the Europa League first qualifying round
4	AIK	30	19	5	6	47	24	+23	62	
5	IFK Norrköping	30	16	9	5	54	26	+28	57	

Source: svenskfotboll.se (in Swedish)
Rules for classification: 1) Points; 2) Goal difference; 3) Goals scored; 4) Head-to-head points; 5) Head-to-head goal difference; 6) Head-to-head away goals scored; 7) Play-off
(Note: Play-off is only played if need to decide champion, teams for relegation or UEFA competition and will be played on a neutral ground).
(C) Champions

==== Results summary ====
Overall								Home						Away					
Pld	W	D	L	GF	GA	GD	Pts	W	D	L	GF	GA	GD	W	D	L	GF	GA	GD
30	20	6	4	53	19	+34	66	10	3	2	29	10	+19	10	3	2	24	9	+15

Last updated: 2 November 2019.
Source: See Results

==== Results by round ====
Round	1	2	3	4	5	6	7	8	9	10	11	12	13	14	15	16	17	18	19	20	21	22	23	24	25	26	27	28	29	30
Ground	H	A	H	A	H	A	A	H	A	H	H	A	H	A	H	A	H	A	H	H	A	A	H	A	H	A	H	A	H	A
Result	D	W	W	W	D	L	D	L	W	W	W	W	W	D	D	W	W	W	W	W	W	L	W	W	W	W	L	W	W	D
Position	6	2	1	1	1	1	4	7	6	5	3	2	2	2	3	3	2	1	1	1	1	1	1	1	1	1	2	1	1	1

Source: See Results
A = Away; H = Home; W = Win; D = Draw; L = Loss

==== Results ====
1 April 2019 1	Djurgårdens IF	2 – 2	GIF Sundsvall	Stockholm
19:00 CEST (UTC+2)	Walker 10'; Turay 16'	Report	Hallenius 30'; Gracia (yellow card) 44'; Eddahri 56'; Blomqvist (yellow card) 61'; Berg (yellow card) 68'	Stadium: Tele2 Arena; Attendance: 20,109; Referee: Bojan Pandzic

8 April 2019 2	Örebro	0 – 3	Djurgårdens IF	Örebro
19:00 CEST (UTC+2)	Gerzić (yellow card) 34'	Report	Witry 27', 90'; Turay 71'	Stadium: Behrn Arena; Attendance: 7,803; Referee: Glenn Nyberg

15 April 2019 3	Djurgårdens IF	2 – 1	IFK Göteborg	Stockholm
19:00 CEST (UTC+2)	Ulvestad 50'; Ring (yellow card) 75'; Turay 88'	Report	Kharaishvili (yellow card) 55' (yellow-red card) 67'; Nygren 82'; Wernersson (yellow card) 90+2'; Vibe (yellow card) 90+2'	Stadium: Tele2 Arena; Attendance: 13,575; Referee: Andreas Ekberg

21 April 2019 4	BK Häcken	0 – 1	Djurgårdens IF	Gothenburg
15:00 CEST (UTC+2)	Faltsetas (yellow card) 13'; Berggren (yellow card) 19'; Mohammed (yellow card) 77'; Paulinho (yellow card) 81'; Lindgren (yellow card) 84'	Report	Karlström (yellow card) 14'; Radetinac (yellow card) 19'; Berg 51'	Stadium: Bravida Arena; Attendance: 4,579; Referee: Bojan Pandzic

25 April 2019 5	Djurgårdens IF	1 – 1	IFK Norrköping	Stockholm
18:45 CEST (UTC+2)	Berg (yellow card) 36' (goal) 90+1'; Turay (yellow card) 75'	Report	Skrabb 40' (yellow card) 56'	Stadium: Tele2 Arena; Attendance: 11,246; Referee: Mohammed Al Hakim

28 April 2019 6	Hammarby	2 – 1	Djurgårdens IF	Stockholm
15:00 CEST (UTC+2)	Khalili (yellow card) 14'; Đurđić 19' (yellow card) 42'; Kjartansson 38'; Bojanić (yellow card) 45+1'; Andersen (yellow card) 56'	Report	Turay 29'; Ajdarević (yellow card) 56'; Bråtveit (yellow card) 68'; Berg (yellow card) 76'	Stadium: Tele2 Arena; Attendance: 27,554; Referee: Andreas Ekberg

6 May 2019 7	Helsingborgs IF	1 – 1	Djurgårdens IF	Helsingborg
19:00 CEST (UTC+2)	Weberg (yellow card) 23'; Wánderson (yellow card) 44'; Jönsson 61'	Report	Turay 7'; Karlström (yellow card) 54'; Augustinsson (yellow card) 56'; Berg (yellow card) 77'	Stadium: Olympia; Attendance: 7,098; Referee: Stefan Johannesson

12 May 2019 8	Djurgårdens IF	0 – 2	AIK	Stockholm
15:00 CEST (UTC+2)		Report	Lahne (yellow card) 25'; Elyounoussi 51', 63'; Salétros (yellow card) 86'; Larsson (yellow card) 87'	Stadium: Tele2 Arena; Attendance: 21,127; Referee: Bojan Pandzic

15 May 2019 9	Falkenbergs FF	0 – 3	Djurgårdens IF	Falkenberg
19:00 CEST (UTC+2)	C.Johansson (yellow card) 50'	Report	Ulvestad (yellow card) 13'; Berg (yellow card) 19'; Ring 21'; Mathisen 24' (o.g.); Radetinac 38'	Stadium: Falcon Alkoholfri Arena; Attendance: 3,228; Referee: Patrik Eriksson

19 May 2019 10	Djurgårdens IF	2 – 0	IF Elfsborg	Stockholm
17:30 CEST (UTC+2)	Ulvestad 4', 44' (pen.); Käck (yellow card) 11'; Radetinac (red card) 16'; Turay (yellow card) 31'; Une Larsson (yellow card) 45+13'; Augustinsson (yellow card) 90+1'	Report	Kabran (yellow card) 24'; Jönsson (yellow card) 43'; Strand (yellow card) 45+8'; Gregersen (yellow card) 45+11'	Stadium: Tele2 Arena; Attendance: 10,100; Referee: Glenn Nyberg

26 May 2019 11	Djurgårdens IF	3 – 1	Östersunds FK	Stockholm
15:00 CEST (UTC+2)	Ring 41', 71'; Une Larsson 45+3'	Report	Tekie 19'; Colkett (yellow card) 79'; Isherwood (yellow card) 90+3'	Stadium: Tele2 Arena; Attendance: 9,609; Referee: Victor Wolf

1 June 2019 12	IK Sirius	0 – 2	Djurgårdens IF	Uppsala
16:00 CEST (UTC+2)	Thor (yellow card) 39'; Ceesay (yellow card) 50'	Report	Ring 17'; Karlström (yellow card) 52'; Bärkroth 88'	Stadium: Studenternas IP; Attendance: 5,663; Referee: Kaspar Sjöberg

1 July 2019 13	Djurgårdens IF	2 – 0	Kalmar FF	Stockholm
19:00 CEST (UTC+2)	Ring (yellow card) 84'; Danielson 87'; Turay 90'; Sabovic (yellow card) 90+5'	Report	Aliti (yellow card) 26'; Nouri (yellow card) 59'	Stadium: Tele2 Arena; Attendance: 12,717; Referee: Martin Strömbergsson

8 July 2019 14	AFC Eskilstuna	1 – 1	Djurgårdens IF	Eskilstuna
19:00 CEST (UTC+2)	Melki (yellow card) 12'; Nnamani 50'; Dresevic (yellow card) 71'	Report	Turay 49'; Augustinsson (yellow card) 86'	Stadium: Tunavallen; Attendance: 6,457; Referee: Stefan Johannesson

14 July 2019 15	Djurgårdens IF	1 – 1	Malmö FF	Stockholm
17:30 CEST (UTC+2)	Karlström 68' (yellow card) 73'	Report	Christiansen (yellow card) 47'; Molins 57'; Brorsson (yellow card) 63'	Stadium: Tele2 Arena; Attendance: 18,316; Referee: Kristoffer Karlsson

22 July 2019 16	Kalmar FF	0 – 1	Djurgårdens IF	Kalmar
19:00 CEST (UTC+2)	Rafinha (yellow card) 8'; Hallberg (yellow card) 65'	Report	Käck (yellow card) 41'; Karlström (yellow card) 67'; Danielson 81'	Stadium: Guldfågeln Arena; Attendance: 8,520; Referee: Bojan Pandzic

28 July 2019 17	Djurgårdens IF	2 – 0	BK Häcken	Stockholm
15:00 CEST (UTC+2)	Une Larsson 80'; Chilufya 90+2'	Report	Ghani (yellow card) 84'	Stadium: Tele2 Arena; Attendance: 10,748; Referee: Andreas Ekberg

5 August 2019 18	IF Elfsborg	0 – 1	Djurgårdens IF	Borås
19:00 CEST (UTC+2)	Frick (yellow card) 43'; Holst (yellow card) 45+2'; Olsson (yellow card) 75'; Ishizaki (yellow card) 81'	Report	Walker 50'; Karlström (yellow card) 89'	Stadium: Borås Arena; Attendance: 7,075; Referee: Mohammed Al Hakim

10 August 2019 19	Djurgårdens IF	4 – 0	IK Sirius	Stockholm
16:00 CEST (UTC+2)	Edwards 6'; Turay 21'; Ring 35'; Ulvestad (yellow card) 41' (goal) 90'} Danielson (yellow card) 48'	Report	Björnström (red card) 5'	Stadium: Tele2 Arena; Attendance: 13,797; Referee: Kaspar Sjöberg

19 August 2019 20	Djurgårdens IF	3 – 0	AFC Eskilstuna	Stockholm
19:00 CEST (UTC+2)	Turay 3'; Danielson 17'; Karlström (yellow card) 38'; Bärkroth 69'	Report	Lushaku (yellow card) 49'; Tsveiba (yellow card) 81'	Stadium: Tele2 Arena; Attendance: 13,255; Referee: Mohammed Al Hakim

25 August 2019 21	Malmö FF	0 – 1	Djurgårdens IF	Malmö
17:30 CEST (UTC+2)	Bengtsson (yellow card) 35'; Rosenberg (penalty missed) 68'; Christiansen (yellow card) 76'; Knudsen (yellow card) 90+3'	Report	Käck (yellow card) 15'; Turay 60'; Une Larsson (yellow card) 62'	Stadium: Stadion; Attendance: 21,812; Referee: Glenn Nyberg

1 September 2019 22	AIK	1 – 0	Djurgårdens IF	Stockholm
15:00 CEST (UTC+2)	Larsson 23' (pen.); Elyounoussi (yellow card) 50'; Adu (red card) 90+1'; Bahoui (yellow card) 90+6'	Report	Danielson (yellow card) 21'; Kujović (yellow card) 90+1'	Stadium: Friends Arena; Attendance: 45,367; Referee: Andreas Ekberg

16 September 2019 23	Djurgårdens IF	2 – 0	Helsingborgs IF	Stockholm
19:00 CEST (UTC+2)	Turay (yellow card) 45'; Kujović 72', 79'	Report	Eriksson (yellow card) 38'; Matthews (yellow card) 89'; Sjöberg (yellow card) 90'	Stadium: Tele2 Arena; Attendance: 16,027; Referee: Stefan Johannesson

20 September 2019 24	GIF Sundsvall	1 – 4	Djurgårdens IF	Sundsvall
19:00 CEST (UTC+2)	Blomberg (yellow card) 6'; Nilsson (yellow card) 9'; Eddahri 13'; Björkander (yellow card) 20'; Konate (yellow card) 78'	Report	Ring 9', 63'; Witry 21'; Kujović 30'; Une Larsson (yellow card) 72'	Stadium: NP3 Arena; Attendance: 5,600; Referee: Patrik Eriksson

24 September 2019 25	Djurgårdens IF	1 – 0	Falkenbergs FF	Stockholm
19:00 CEST (UTC+2)	Turay 54'	Report	Björkengren (yellow card) 23'; Karlsson (yellow card) 55'; Wede (yellow card) 86'	Stadium: Tele2 Arena; Attendance: 15,433; Referee: Kaspar Sjöberg

30 September 2019 26	Östersunds FK	1 – 2	Djurgårdens IF	Östersund
19:00 CEST (UTC+2)	Kadiri 28'; Keita (yellow card) 45+3'; Ouattara (yellow card) 47'	Report	Bärkroth 45+3'; Danielson 76'; Ajdarević (yellow card) 89'	Stadium: Jämtkraft Arena; Attendance: 4,262; Referee: Glenn Nyberg

6 October 2019 27	Djurgårdens IF	1 – 2	Hammarby	Stockholm
15:00 CEST (UTC+2)	Karlström (yellow card) 62'; Turay 74'	Report	Fenger (yellow card) 45'; Andersen (yellow card) 50' (yellow-red card) 59'; Đurđić 53'; Kačaniklić 56'; Tanković (yellow card) 75'; Blažević (yellow card) 82'	Stadium: Tele2 Arena; Attendance: 25,053; Referee: Kristoffer Karlsson

21 October 2019 28	IFK Göteborg	0 – 1	Djurgårdens IF	Gothenburg
19:00 CEST (UTC+2)	Erlingmark (yellow card) 55'; Sana (yellow card) 87'; Eriksson (yellow card) 90+5'	Report	Turay (yellow card) 7' (goal) 70'; Käck (yellow card) 22'; Witry (yellow card) 43'; Vaiho (yellow card) 65'; Edwards (yellow card) 90+4'	Stadium: Gamla Ullevi; Attendance: 13,438; Referee: Kristoffer Karlsson

28 October 2019 29	Djurgårdens IF	3 – 0	Örebro	Stockholm
19:00 CET (UTC+1)	Ulvestad 3' (pen.); Turay 63'; Kujović 89'	Report	Kasim (yellow card) 66'	Stadium: Tele2 Arena; Attendance: 28,258; Referee: Stefan Johannesson

2 November 2019 30	IFK Norrköping	2 – 2	Djurgårdens IF	Norrköping
13:00 CET (UTC+1)	Lauritsen 8' (yellow card) 67'; Þórarinsson (yellow card) 10' (yellow-red card) 73'; Hakšabanović 14'; Gerson (yellow card) 58'	Report	Turay (yellow card) 43' (goal) 65'; Karlström 50' (yellow card) 75'; Ulvestad (yellow card) 89'	Stadium: Nya Parken; Attendance: 15,150; Referee: Glenn Nyberg

=== 2018–19 Svenska Cupen ===
==== Group stage ====
Pos	Team	Pld	W	D	L	GF	GA	GD	Pts	Qualification
1	Djurgårdens IF	3	3	0	0	8	3	+5	9	Advance to Knockout stage
2	IK Frej	3	1	1	1	9	3	+6	4	
3	IF Elfsborg	3	1	1	1	8	5	+3	4	
4	Hässleholms IF	3	0	0	3	1	15	−14	0	

Updated to match(es) played on 3 March 2019. Source: Swedish Football Association
Rules for classification: 1) Points; 2) Goal difference; 3) Goals scored; 4) Head-to-head record; 5) Highest ranked team

17 February 2019 1	Djurgårdens IF	2 – 1	IK Frej	Stockholm
15:00 CET (UTC+1)	Walker 35'; Fonn Witry 50'; Ring (yellow card) 53'	Report	L.Polo (yellow card) 40'; Frithzell 59'; Ribeiro (yellow card) 74'	Stadium: Tele2 Arena; Attendance: 4,999; Referee: Glenn Nyberg

23 February 2019 2	Hässleholms IF	0 – 3	Djurgårdens IF	Hässleholm
14:00 CET (UTC+1)	B.Rexhepi (yellow card) 30'; Ahmeti (yellow card) 57'; O.Nilsson (yellow card) 85'	Report	Une Larsson 16'; Danielson 35'; Andersson 88'	Stadium: Österås IP; Attendance: 1,000; Referee: Kaspar Sjöberg

3 March 2019 3	Djurgårdens IF	3 – 2	IF Elfsborg	Stockholm
15:00 CET (UTC+1)	Walker (penalty missed) 9'; Fonn Witry (yellow card) 45+1'; Karlström 47'; Radetinac 54'; Karlström (yellow card) 78'; Kozica 90+1'	Report	Fonn Witry 12' (o.g.); Manns (yellow card) 17'; Strand (yellow card) 44'; Cibicki 56'; Holst (yellow card) 90+6'	Stadium: Tele2 Arena; Attendance: 6,526; Referee: Kristoffer Karlsson

==== Knockout stage ====
10 March 2019 Quarter-final	Djurgårdens IF	0 – 0 (a.e.t.) (4 – 2 p)	Hammarby IF	Stockholm
15:00 CET (UTC+1)	Buya Turay (yellow card) 12'; Käck (yellow card) 78'	Report	Kossounou (yellow card) 24'	Stadium: Tele2 Arena; Attendance: 20,750; Referee: Glenn Nyberg
	Penalties
	Walker (penalty missed); Danielson (penalty scored); Ulvestad (penalty scored); Karlström (penalty scored); Fonn Witry (penalty scored)		Andersen (penalty missed); Fenger (penalty scored); Đurđić (penalty missed); Tanković (penalty scored)

16 March 2019 Semi-final	Djurgårdens IF	2 – 3 (a.e.t.)	BK Häcken	Stockholm
18:15 CET (UTC+1)	Danielson 13'; Karlström (yellow card) 26' (yellow-red card) 113'; Buya Turay 38'; Ajdarević (yellow card) 65'; Fonn Witry (yellow card) 74'	Report	Mohammed 34'; Jeremejeff 60'; Friberg (yellow card) 90'; Çelik 109' (yellow card) 109'; Ghani (yellow card) 116'	Stadium: Tele2 Arena; Referee: Glenn Nyberg

=== 2019–20 Svenska Cupen ===
22 August 2019 Second round	Akropolis IF	1 – 2	Djurgårdens IF	Stockholm
18:30 CEST (UTC+2)	Sivodedov (yellow card) 68'; N.Lindqvist 85'	Report	Radetinac 5'; Pettersson 8'	Stadium: Spånga IP; Attendance: 1,680; Referee: Victor Wolf

Group stages take place during the 2020 season.

== Squad statistics ==
As of match played 2 November 2019

=== Appearances and goals ===
No.	Pos	Nat	Player	Total		Allsvenskan		2018–19 Svenska Cupen		2019–20 Svenska Cupen	
No.	Pos	Nat	Player	Apps	Goals	Apps	Goals	Apps	Goals	Apps	Goals
3	DF	(Sweden) SWE	Marcus Danielson	33	6	27	4	5	2	1	0
4	DF	(Sweden) SWE	Jacob Une Larsson	30	3	25	2	5	1	0	0
5	DF	(Sweden) SWE	Elliot Käck	33	0	27	0	5	0	0+1	0
6	MF	(Sweden) SWE	Jesper Karlström	34	3	28	2	5	1	1	0
8	MF	(Sweden) SWE	Kevin Walker	27	3	8+13	2	5	1	1	0
9	MF	(Bosnia and Herzegovina) BIH	Haris Radetinac	28	3	15+9	1	2+1	1	1	1
10	MF	(Albania) ALB	Astrit Ajdarević	28	0	16+10	0	0+2	0	0	0
11	MF	(Sweden) SWE	Jonathan Ring	34	7	28+1	7	5	0	0	0
12	GK	(Norway) NOR	Per Kristian Bråtveit	16	0	10	0	5	0	1	0
15	DF	(Sweden) SWE	Jonathan Augustinsson	18	0	9+7	0	0+1	0	1	0
16	DF	(Norway) NOR	Aslak Fonn Witry	29	4	24+1	3	4	1	0	0
17	MF	(Sweden) SWE	Hampus Finndell	4	0	0+3	0	0	0	1	0
18	MF	(Zambia) ZAM	Edward Chilufya	13	1	3+6	1	4	0	0	0
19	MF	(Sweden) SWE	Nicklas Bärkroth	23	3	8+11	3	2+1	0	1	0
20	FW	(Sweden) SWE	Emir Kujović	10	4	2+7	4	0	0	0+1	0
21	DF	(Sweden) SWE	Erik Berg	11	2	10+1	2	0	0	0	0
22	FW	(Sweden) SWE	Adam Bergmark Wiberg	11	0	0+5	0	3+2	0	1	0
23	MF	(Norway) NOR	Fredrik Ulvestad	33	6	30	5	2+1	1	0	0
24	MF	(England) ENG	Curtis Edwards	13	1	11+1	1	0	0	0+1	0
28	DF	(Sweden) SWE	Alexander Abrahamsson	2	0	0	0	1	0	1	0
29	FW	(Sweden) SWE	Oscar Pettersson	4	1	0+2	0	1	0	1	1
30	GK	(Sweden) SWE	Tommi Vaiho	20	0	20	0	0	0	0	0
77	FW	(Sierra Leone) SLE	Mohamed Buya Turay	31	16	28+1	15	2	1	0	0
Players away from Djurgårdens on loan:
2	DF	(Sweden) SWE	Johan Andersson	2	1	1	0	0+1	1	0	0
7	MF	(Sweden) SWE	Dženis Kozica	3	0	0	0	0+3	0	0	0
14	MF	(North Macedonia) MKD	Besard Sabovic	3	0	0+1	0	0+2	0	0	0
Players who left Djurgårdens during the season:

=== Goal scorers ===
Place	Position	Nation	Number	Name	Allsvenskan	2018–19 Svenska Cupen	2019–20 Svenska Cupen	Total
1	FW	(Sierra Leone)	77	Mohamed Buya Turay	15	1	0	16
2	MF	(Sweden)	11	Jonathan Ring	7	0	0	7
3	DF	(Sweden)	3	Marcus Danielson	4	2	0	6
4	MF	(Norway)	23	Fredrik Ulvestad	5	0	0	5
5	FW	(Sweden)	20	Emir Kujović	4	0	0	4
5	DF	(Norway)	16	Aslak Fonn Witry	3	1	0	4
7	MF	(Sweden)	19	Nicklas Bärkroth	3	0	0	3
7	DF	(Sweden)	4	Jacob Une Larsson	2	1	0	3
7	MF	(Sweden)	6	Jesper Karlström	2	1	0	3
7	MF	(Sweden)	8	Kevin Walker	2	1	0	3
7	MF	(Bosnia and Herzegovina)	9	Haris Radetinac	3	1	1	2
12	DF	(Sweden)	21	Erik Berg	2	0	0	2
13	MF	(England)	24	Curtis Edwards	1	0	0	1
13	DF	(Sweden)	2	Johan Andersson	0	1	0	1
13	MF	(Sweden)	7	Dženis Kozica	0	1	0	1
13	FW	(Sweden)	29	Oscar Pettersson	0	0	1	1
13				Own goal	1	0	0	1
				TOTALS	53	10	2	65

=== Disciplinary record ===
Number	Nation	Position	Name	Allsvenskan		2018–19 Svenska Cupen		2019–20 Svenska Cupen		Total	
Number	Nation	Position	Name	Booked	Sent off (straight red)	Booked	Sent off (straight red)	Booked	Sent off (straight red)	Booked	Sent off (straight red)
3	(Sweden)	DF	Marcus Danielson	2	0	0	0	0	0	2	0
4	(Sweden)	DF	Jacob Une Larsson	3	0	0	0	0	0	3	0
5	(Sweden)	DF	Elliot Käck	4	0	1	0	0	0	5	0
6	(Sweden)	MF	Jesper Karlström	9	0	2	0	0	0	11	0
8	(Sweden)	MF	Kevin Walker	1	0	0	0	0	0	1	0
9	(Bosnia and Herzegovina)	MF	Haris Radetinac	1	1	0	0	0	0	1	1
10	(Albania)	MF	Astrit Ajdarević	2	0	1	0	0	0	3	0
11	(Sweden)	MF	Jonathan Ring	2	0	1	0	0	0	3	0
12	(Norway)	GK	Per Kristian Bråtveit	1	0	0	0	0	0	1	0
15	(Sweden)	DF	Jonathan Augustinsson	3	0	0	0	0	0	3	0
16	(Norway)	DF	Aslak Fonn Witry	1	0	2	0	0	0	3	0
20	(Sweden)	FW	Emir Kujović	1	0	0	0	0	0	1	0
21	(Sweden)	DF	Erik Berg	4	0	0	0	0	0	4	0
23	(Norway)	MF	Fredrik Ulvestad	3	0	0	0	0	0	3	0
24	(England)	MF	Curtis Edwards	1	0	0	0	0	0	1	0
30	(Sweden)	GK	Tommi Vaiho	1	0	0	0	0	0	1	0
77	(Sierra Leone)	FW	Mohamed Buya Turay	5	0	1	0	0	0	6	0
Players away from Djurgårdens IF on loan:
14	(North Macedonia)	MF	Besard Sabovic	1	0	0	0	0	0	1	0
Players who left Djurgårdens IF during the season:
			TOTALS	41	1	8	0	0	0	49	1
