= 2018 Djurgårdens IF season =

Djurgårdens IF Fotboll
2018 season
- Chairman: Lars-Erik Sjöberg
- Manager: Özcan Melkemichel
- Stadium: Tele2 Arena
- Allsvenskan: 7th
- 2017–18 Svenska Cupen: Champions
- 2018–19 Svenska Cupen: Group stage (continued in 2019)
- UEFA Europa League: Second qualifying round vs Mariupol
- Top goalscorer: League: Aliou Badji (10); All: Tino Kadewere (12)
Home colours	Away colours	Third colours

The 2018 season is Djurgårdens IF's 118th in existence, their 63rd season in Allsvenskan and their 18th consecutive season in the league. They are competing in Allsvenskan and Svenska Cupen and qualified for the 2018–19 UEFA Europa League.

== Squad ==
As of 12 August 2018

Note: Flags indicate national team as defined under FIFA eligibility rules; some limited exceptions apply. Players may hold more than one non-FIFA nationality.

No.	Pos.	Nation	Player
1	GK	SWE	Andreas Isaksson (vice-captain)
2	DF	SWE	Johan Andersson
3	DF	SWE	Marcus Danielson
4	DF	SWE	Jacob Une Larsson
5	DF	NOR	Niklas Gunnarsson
6	MF	SWE	Jesper Karlström
7	MF	SWE	Dženis Kozica
8	MF	SWE	Kevin Walker
9	MF	BIH	Haris Radetinac
10	MF	SWE	Kerim Mrabti
11	MF	SWE	Jonathan Ring
12	FW	SWE	Omar Eddahri

No.	Pos.	Nation	Player
13	DF	SWE	Jonas Olsson (captain)
14	MF	SWE	Besard Sabović
15	DF	SWE	Jonathan Augustinsson
17	MF	SWE	Hampus Finndell
18	MF	ZAM	Edward Chilufya
19	MF	SWE	Nicklas Bärkroth
20	FW	SEN	Aliou Badji
21	DF	SWE	Erik Johansson
23	MF	NOR	Fredrik Ulvestad
30	GK	SWE	Tommi Vaiho
35	GK	SWE	Oscar Jonsson
37	DF	SWE	Matteo Catenacci

=== Out on loan ===
Note: Flags indicate national team as defined under FIFA eligibility rules; some limited exceptions apply. Players may hold more than one non-FIFA nationality.

No.	Pos.	Nation	Player
19	DF	SWE	Marcus Hansson (on loan at IK Frej until the end of 2018 season)
—	FW	SWE	Amadou Jawo (on loan at IK Frej until the end of 2018 season)
—	MF	SWE	Joseph Ceesay (on loan at IK Frej until the end of 2018 season)

No.	Pos.	Nation	Player
—	DF	CIV	Souleymane Kone (on loan at Dunajská Streda until the end of 2018 season)
—	MF	RSA	Mihlali Mayambela (on loan at IK Brage until the end of 2018 season)

== Transfers ==
=== Winter ===
In: Note: Flags indicate national team as defined under FIFA eligibility rules; some limited exceptions apply. Players may hold more than one non-FIFA nationality.

No.	Pos.	Nation	Player
2	DF	SWE	Johan Andersson (from (Sweden) IK Sirius)
3	DF	SWE	Marcus Danielsson (from (Sweden) GIF Sundsvall)
7	MF	SWE	Dženis Kozica (from (Sweden) Jönköpings Södra)
11	MF	SWE	Jonathan Ring (from (Sweden) Kalmar FF)
17	MF	SWE	Hampus Finndell (from (Netherlands) Groningen)
18	MF	ZAM	Edward Chilufya (from (Zambia) Mpande Youth Academy)
19	FW	ARM	Yura Movsisyan (loan from (United States) Real Salt Lake)
23	MF	NOR	Fredrik Ulvestad (from (England) Burnley)
14	MF	SWE	Besard Sabovic (loan return from (Sweden) Brommapojkarna)
35	GK	SWE	Oscar Jonsson (loan return from (Sweden) Enskede)
37	DF	SWE	Matteo Catenacci (from (Sweden) Brommapojkarna)

Out: Note: Flags indicate national team as defined under FIFA eligibility rules; some limited exceptions apply. Players may hold more than one non-FIFA nationality.

No.	Pos.	Nation	Player
3	DF	SWE	Elliot Käck (to (Norway) IK Start)
7	MF	SWE	Magnus Eriksson (to (United States) San Jose Earthquakes)
11	FW	SWE	Amadou Jawo (loan to (Sweden) IK Frej)
15	DF	CIV	Souleymane Kone (loan to (Slovakia) Dunajská Streda)
16	MF	SWE	Kim Källström (Retired)
17	FW	SWE	Gustav Engvall (loan return to (England) Bristol City)
19	DF	SWE	Marcus Hansson (loan to (Sweden) IK Frej)
21	MF	RSA	Mihlali Mayambela (on loan to (Sweden) IK Brage)
23	MF	SWE	Joseph Ceesay (on loan to (Sweden) IK Frej)
29	FW	NGR	Haruna Garba (loan to (Malta) Gżira United)
58	MF	NED	Othman El Kabir (to (Russia) Ural Yekaterinburg)

=== Summer ===
In: Note: Flags indicate national team as defined under FIFA eligibility rules; some limited exceptions apply. Players may hold more than one non-FIFA nationality.

No.	Pos.	Nation	Player
12	FW	SWE	Omar Eddahri (from (Morocco) Ittihad Tanger)
19	MF	SWE	Nicklas Bärkroth (from (Poland) Lech Poznań)
21	DF	SWE	Erik Johansson (from (Denmark) Copenhagen)
—	FW	RSA	Bongi Ntuli (trial from (South Africa) Mamelodi Sundowns)

Out: Note: Flags indicate national team as defined under FIFA eligibility rules; some limited exceptions apply. Players may hold more than one non-FIFA nationality.

No.	Pos.	Nation	Player
19	FW	ARM	Yura Movsisyan (loan return to (United States) Real Salt Lake)
21	FW	NOR	Julian Kristoffersen (to (Denmark) Hobro)
22	DF	SWE	Felix Beijmo (to (Germany) Werder Bremen)
24	FW	ZIM	Tino Kadewere (to (France) Le Havre)
29	FW	NGR	Haruna Garba (to (Malta) Gżira United, previously on loan)

== Competitions ==
=== Allsvenskan ===
==== Results summary ====
Overall								Home						Away					
Pld	W	D	L	GF	GA	GD	Pts	W	D	L	GF	GA	GD	W	D	L	GF	GA	GD
30	13	9	8	39	30	+9	48	6	5	4	16	12	+4	7	4	4	23	18	+5

Last updated: 11 November 2018.
Source: See Results

==== Results by round ====
Round	1	2	3	4	5	6	7	8	9	10	11	12	13	14	15	16	17	18	19	20	21	22	23	24	25	26	27	28	29	30
Ground	A	H	A	H	A	H	A	A	H	H	A	A	H	A	H	H	A	H	H	A	H	H	A	H	A	H	A	H	A	H
Result	W	D	L	W	D	L	L	L	W	W	W	W	D	W	W	D	L	L	D	W	L	W	D	L	D	D	D	W	W	W
Position	7	5	7	4	5	8	10	10	9	7	5	4	4	4	4	5	5	7	8	7	8	8	8	8	8	8	8	8	7	7

Source: See Results
A = Away; H = Home; W = Win; D = Draw; L = Loss

==== Results ====
1 April 2018 1	Östersund	0–1	Djurgårdens IF	Östersund
17:30 CEST (UTC+2)	Papagiannopoulos (yellow card) 42'	Report	Danielsson 13' (yellow card) 90+2'; Walker (yellow card) 87'	Stadium: Jämtkraft Arena; Attendance: 7,114; Referee: Stefan Johannesson

8 April 2018 2	Djurgårdens IF	1–1	Trelleborg	Stockholm
15:00 CEST (UTC+2)	Danielsson 29'; Ulvestad (yellow card) 63'	Report	E.Andersson 54'; Jovanović (yellow card) 72'; Nielsen (yellow card) 80'	Stadium: Tele2 Arena; Attendance: 17,190; Referee: Magnus Lindgren

15 April 2018 3	AIK	2–0	Djurgårdens IF	Stockholm
15:00 CEST (UTC+2)	Lindkvist 15' (yellow card) 90+3'; Sundgren (yellow card) 26'; Olsson (yellow card) 30'; Elyounoussi 46'; Salétros (yellow card) 88'	Report	Olsson (yellow card) 21'; Ulvestad (yellow card) 23'; Movsisyan (red card) 90+2'; Badji (yellow card) 90+3'	Stadium: Friends Arena; Attendance: 30,552; Referee: Jonas Eriksson

18 April 2018 4	Djurgårdens IF	3–0	Malmö FF	Stockholm
19:00 CEST (UTC+2)	Kadewere 46', 77'; Kozica 90+2'	Report	Nielsen (yellow card) 72'	Stadium: Tele2 Arena; Attendance: 13,010; Referee: Mohammed Al Hakim

23 April 2018 5	IF Elfsborg	2–2	Djurgårdens IF	Borås
19:00 CEST (UTC+2)	Lundevall 9'; Gojani (yellow card) 70'; Drešević (yellow card) 80'; Olsson (yellow card) 80'; Jönsson 90'	Report	Ring 21'; Badji 45'; Augustinsson (yellow card) 84'; Olsson (yellow card) 89'	Stadium: Borås Arena; Attendance: 6,540; Referee: Glenn Nyberg

29 April 2018 6	Djurgårdens IF	1–2	Hammarby	Stockholm
15:00 CEST (UTC+2)	Kadewere (yellow card) 26'; Larsson (yellow card) 68'; Walker 78' (pen.)	Report	Tanković 3'; Smárason (yellow card) 77'; Dibba (yellow card) 86' (goal) 90+1'	Stadium: Tele2 Arena; Attendance: 24,396; Referee: Martin Strömbergsson

3 May 2018 7	Malmö FF	1–0	Djurgårdens IF	Malmö
19:00 CEST (UTC+2)	Strandberg 59'; Svanberg (yellow card) 65'	Report	Olsson (yellow card) 20' (yellow-red card) 90+2'; Danielsson (yellow card) 50'	Stadium: Stadion; Attendance: 15,728; Referee: Andreas Ekberg

6 May 2018 8	IF Brommapojkarna	1–0	Djurgårdens IF	Stockholm
15:00 CEST (UTC+2)	Omondi 28'	Report	Karlström (yellow card) 47'	Stadium: Grimsta IP; Attendance: 4,378; Referee: Glenn Nyberg

13 May 2018 9	Djurgårdens IF	1–0	Dalkurd	Stockholm
16:00 CEST (UTC+2)	Kadewere 55'	Report	Amin (yellow card) 39'	Stadium: Tele2 Arena; Attendance: 10,432; Referee: Magnus Lindgren

17 May 2018 10	Djurgårdens IF	2–0	Örebro	Stockholm
19:00 CEST (UTC+2)	Mrabti (yellow card) 32' (goal) 90+1'; Kadewere 67'; Larsson (yellow card) 73'; Beijmo (yellow card) 90+3'	Report	Omoh (yellow card) 26'; Brorsson (yellow card) 78'	Stadium: Tele2 Arena; Attendance: 10,104; Referee: Kristoffer Karlsson

24 May 2018 11	IFK Göteborg	1–3	Djurgårdens IF	Gothenburg
19:00 CEST (UTC+2)	Engvall (yellow card) 28'; Diskerud (yellow card) 52'; Hysén 75'	Report	Mrabti 3' (yellow card) 37'; Beijmo 22'; Ring 54'; Isaksson (yellow card) 90+4'	Stadium: Gamla Ullevi; Attendance: 12,268; Referee: Mohammed Al Hakim

27 May 2018 11	IK Sirius	1–5	Djurgårdens IF	Uppsala
17:30 CEST (UTC+2)	Ogbu 89' (pen.)	Report	Augustinsson (yellow card) 17'; Kadewere 22', 86', 90', 90+3'; Larsson (yellow card) 73'; Ring 77'	Stadium: Studenternas IP; Attendance: 6,192; Referee: Jonas Eriksson

8 July 2018 12	Djurgårdens IF	1–1	IFK Norrköping	Stockholm
17:30 CEST (UTC+2)	Radetinac 14'; Mrabti (yellow card) 58'; Olsson (yellow card) 90+3'	Report	Fjóluson (yellow card) 10'; Skrabb 67'; Dagerstål (yellow card) 77'	Stadium: Tele2 Arena; Attendance: 12,212; Referee: Andreas Ekberg

15 July 2018 14	Kalmar FF	0–1	Djurgårdens IF	Kalmar
14:00 CEST (UTC+2)	Elm (yellow card) 90+6'	Report	Augustinsson 4'	Stadium: Guldfågeln Arena; Attendance: 8,048; Referee: Kasper Sjöberg

22 July 2018 15	Djurgårdens IF	2–1	BK Häcken	Stockholm
15:00 CEST (UTC+2)	Larsson 41'; Olsson (yellow card) 67'; Ulvestad (yellow card) 75'; Gunnarsson (yellow card) 84'; Badji 90+3'	Report	Paulinho 15'; Lindgren (yellow card) 24'; Friberg (yellow card) 75'	Stadium: Tele2 Arena; Attendance: 8,705; Referee: Glenn Nyberg

29 July 2018 16	Djurgårdens IF	1–1	GIF Sundsvall	Stockholm
15:00 CEST (UTC+2)	Badji 76'	Report	Batanero (yellow card) 70'; Wilson 80'; Ciércoles (yellow card) 84'	Stadium: Tele2 Arena; Attendance: 9,898; Referee: Mohammed Al Hakim

12 August 2018 17	BK Häcken	5–0	Djurgårdens IF	Gothenburg
15:00 CEST (UTC+2)	Mohammed 40', 64'; Paulinho 44' (pen.), 51'; Ekpolo (yellow card) 55'; Hammar 72'	Report	Karlström (yellow card) 65'; Walker (yellow card) 79'	Stadium: Bravida Arena; Attendance: 3,384; Referee: Andreas Ekberg

19 August 2018 18	Djurgårdens IF	0–2	Kalmar FF	Stockholm
17:30 CEST (UTC+2)	Ulvestad (yellow card) 88'; Augustinsson (yellow card) 90+1'	Report	Agardius (yellow card) 24'; Fejzullahu 35', 63'; Magnusson (yellow card) 51'	Stadium: Tele2 Arena; Attendance: 9,602; Referee: Magnus Lindgren

26 August 2018 19	Djurgårdens IF	2–2	IF Elfsborg	Stockholm
17:30 CEST (UTC+2)	Larsson (yellow card) 31'; Gunnarsson (yellow card) 43'; Badji (yellow card) 64'; Ulvestad 70' (pen.); Kozica 81'	Report	Frick (yellow card) 3'; Ishizaki (yellow card) 45+1'; Dyer 59'; Lundevall 61'	Stadium: Tele2 Arena; Attendance: 7,608; Referee: Stefan Johannesson

2 September 2018 20	Hammarby	1–3	Djurgårdens IF	Stockholm
15:00 CEST (UTC+2)	Andersen (yellow card) 9'; Neto (yellow card) 43'; Rodić 65'	Report	Mrabti 20'; Radetinac 59'; Badji 89'; Johansson (yellow card) 90+1'	Stadium: Tele2 Arena; Attendance: 26,937; Referee: Mohammed Al Hakim

16 September 2018 21	Djurgårdens IF	0–1	IF Brommapojkarna	Stockholm
17:30 CEST (UTC+2)		Report	Magnusson 51'; Brandeborn (yellow card) 73'	Stadium: Tele2 Arena; Attendance: 9,604; Referee: Kaspar Sjöberg

22 September 2018 22	Trelleborg	0–3	Djurgårdens IF	Trelleborg
16:00 CEST (UTC+2)	Tideman (yellow card) 53'; Hümmet (yellow card) 68'	Report	Mrabti 42', 43'; Augustinsson (yellow card) 68'; Radetinac (yellow card) 68'; Olsson (yellow card) 75'; Kozica 90+4'	Stadium: Vångavallen; Attendance: 1,592; Referee: Bojan Pandzic

26 September 2018 23	GIF Sundsvall	1–1	Djurgårdens IF	Sundsvall
19:00 CEST (UTC+2)	Myrestam (yellow card) 71'; Ciércoles (yellow card) 85'; Berg 89'	Report	Mrabti 23'; Ulvestad (yellow card) 89'	Stadium: Idrottsparken; Attendance: 4,595; Referee: Patrik Eriksson

30 September 2018 24	Djurgårdens IF	0–2	Östersund	Stockholm
17:30 CEST (UTC+2)	Bärkroth (yellow card) 64'	Report	Mukiibi 13' (yellow card) 65'; Widgren 48'	Stadium: Tele2 Arena; Attendance: 10,274; Referee: Magnus Lindgren

7 October 2018 25	IFK Norrköping	1–1	Djurgårdens IF	Norrköping
17:30 CEST (UTC+2)	Danielson 10' (o.g.)	Report	Karlström (yellow card) 66'; Badji 69'	Stadium: Nya Parken; Attendance: 9,433; Referee: Kaspar Sjöberg

21 October 2018 26	Djurgårdens IF	0–0	AIK	Stockholm
15:00 CEST (UTC+2)	Johansson (yellow card) 28'; Olsson (yellow card) 77'	Report	Adu (yellow card) 4'; Milošević (yellow card) 25'; Elyounoussi (yellow card) 39'	Stadium: Tele2 Arena; Attendance: 21,711; Referee: Stefan Johannesson

28 October 2018 27	Örebro	1–1	Djurgårdens IF	Örebro
15:00 CET (UTC+1)	Gerzić 53'	Report	Larsson (yellow card) 3'; Rogić 44' (o.g.); Danielson (yellow card) 79'; Gunnarsson (yellow card) 85'	Stadium: Behrn Arena; Attendance: 5,795; Referee: Johan Hamlin

31 October 2018 28	Djurgårdens IF	2–0	IFK Göteborg	Stockholm
19:00 CET (UTC+1)	Badji 9', 45'; Johansson (yellow card) 49'; Ring (yellow card) 51'	Report	Ohlsson (yellow card) 38'; Jensen (yellow card) 68'	Stadium: Tele2 Arena; Attendance: 8,751; Referee: Kristoffer Karlsson

5 November 2018 29	Dalkurd	1–2	Djurgårdens IF	Gävle
19:00 CET (UTC+1)	Awad 45+2'	Report	Badji 28' (yellow card) 47'; Danielson (yellow card) 60'; Ring 90'	Stadium: Gavlevallen; Attendance: 768; Referee: Magnus Lindgren

11 November 2018 30	Djurgårdens IF	1–0	IK Sirius	Stockholm
15:00 CET (UTC+1)	Walker 13'; Augustinsson (yellow card) 52'	Report	Haglund (yellow card) 67'	Stadium: Tele2 Arena; Attendance: 11,106; Referee: Adam Ladebäck

==== League table ====
Pos	Team	Pld	W	D	L	GF	GA	GD	Pts	Qualification or relegation
5	BK Häcken	30	16	5	9	58	27	+31	53	Qualification for the Europa League second qualifying round (Note: BK Häcken qualified for the Europa League second qualifying round by winning the 2018–19 Svenska Cupen.)
6	Östersunds FK	30	15	4	11	51	39	+12	49	
7	Djurgårdens IF	30	13	9	8	40	31	+9	48	
8	GIF Sundsvall	30	12	8	10	47	35	+12	44	
9	Örebro SK	30	9	8	13	34	40	−6	35	

Source: svenskfotboll.se (in Swedish)
Rules for classification: 1) Points; 2) Goal difference; 3) Goals scored; 4) Head-to-head points; 5) Head-to-head goal difference; 6) Head-to-head away goals scored; 7) Play-off
(Note: Play-off is only played if need to decide champion, teams for relegation or UEFA competition and will be played on a neutral ground).

=== 2017–18 Svenska Cupen ===
==== Group stage ====
Pos	Team	Pld	W	D	L	GF	GA	GD	Pts	Qualification
1	Djurgårdens IF	3	3	0	0	8	0	+8	9	Advance to Knockout stage
2	Degerfors IF	3	1	1	1	4	8	−4	4	
3	IK Frej Täby	3	1	0	2	3	5	−2	3	
4	Jönköpings Södra IF	3	0	1	2	2	4	−2	1	

Source: Swedish Football Association
Rules for classification: 1) Points; 2) Goal difference; 3) Goals scored; 4) Head-to-head record; 5) Highest ranked team

19 February 2018 1	Djurgårdens IF	6–0	Degerfors IF	Stockholm
19:00 CET (UTC+1)	Radetinac 16', 90'; Mrabti 33'; Augustinsson 48'; Kadewere 51', 55'	Report	O.Ekroth (yellow card) 18'; N.Ladan (yellow card) 58'	Stadium: Tele2 Arena; Attendance: 5,568; Referee: Antti Kanerva

24 February 2018 2	IK Frej	0–1	Djurgårdens IF	Täby
12:00 CET (UTC+1)	D.Zlotnik (yellow card) 45'; Falkeborn (yellow card) 85'	Report	Olsson (yellow card) 42'; Gunnarsson 75'; Karlström (yellow card) 89'	Stadium: Vikingavallen; Attendance: 2,516; Referee: Magnus Lindgren

3 March 2018 3	Djurgårdens IF	1–0	Jönköpings Södra	Stockholm
14:00 CET (UTC+1)	Walker 84'	Report		Stadium: Tele2 Arena; Attendance: 6,214; Referee: Stefan Johannesson

==== Knockout stage ====
12 March 2018 Quarter-final	Djurgårdens IF	1–0	BK Häcken	Stockholm
19:00 CET (UTC+1)	Kadewere 77'	Report	Lindgren (yellow card) 78'; Friberg (yellow card) 84'	Stadium: Tele2 Arena; Attendance: 6,697; Referee: Mohammed Al-Hakim

18 March 2018 Semi-final	AIK	0–2	Djurgårdens IF	Solna
19:05 CET (UTC+1)	Olsson (yellow card) 72'	Report	Kadewere 46'; Mrabti 67'; Augustinsson (yellow card) 70'; Karlström (yellow card) 84'	Stadium: Friends Arena; Attendance: 21,200; Referee: Andreas Ekberg

==== Final ====
10 May 2018	Djurgårdens IF	3–0	Malmö FF	Stockholm
15:00 CEST (UTC+2)	Une Larsson 17'; Mrabti (yellow card) 24' (goal) 47'; Karlström (yellow card) 37'; Ring 81'; Kadewere (yellow card) 90'	Report	Rieks (yellow card) 31'; Traustason (yellow card) 37'; Svanberg (yellow card) 71'; Larsson (yellow card) 78'; Nielsen (yellow card) 90'	Stadium: Tele2 Arena; Attendance: 25,123; Referee: Bojan Pandžić

=== 2018–19 Svenska Cupen ===
22 August 2018 Second round	IF Sylvia	0–4	Djurgårdens IF	Norrköping
18:30 CET (UTC+1)		Report	Karlström 21'; Danielsson 30'; Chilufya 61'; Une Larsson 63'	Stadium: Nya Parken; Referee: Nermin Cisic

Group stages took place during the 2019 season.

=== UEFA Europa League ===
==== Qualifying round ====
26 July 2018 Second qualifying round 1st leg	Djurgårdens IF (Sweden)	1–1	(Ukraine) Mariupol	Stockholm, Sweden
19:00 CET (UTC+1)	Ring (yellow card) 71'; Walker (yellow card) 75'; Olsson (yellow card) 90'; Badji 90+4'	Report	Yavorskyi 37'; Horbunov (yellow card) 76'; Khudzhamov (yellow card) 90+3'; Pikhalyonok (yellow card) 90+6'	Stadium: Tele2 Arena; Attendance: 11,200; Referee: Miroslav Zelinka (Czech Republic)

2 August 2018 Second qualifying round 2nd leg	Mariupol (Ukraine)	2–1 (a.e.t.) (3–2 agg.)	(Sweden) Djurgårdens IF	Odesa, Ukraine
19:00 CET (UTC+1)	Fomin (yellow card) 56' (goal) 97' (pen.); Pikhalyonok (yellow card) 61' (goal) 63'	Report	Badji (yellow card) 56' (goal) 77'; Augustinsson (yellow card) 65'; Karlström (yellow card) 83'; Olsson (yellow card) 96'; Ulvestad (yellow card) 114'; Mrabti (yellow card) 120+2'	Stadium: Chornomorets Stadium; Referee: Rob Harvey (Republic of Ireland)
Note: Mariupol played their home matches at Chornomorets Stadium, Odesa, instead of their regular stadium Volodymyr Boiko Stadium, Mariupol, due to the war conditions in Eastern Ukraine.

== Squad statistics ==
As of match played 11 November 2018

=== Appearances and goals ===
No.	Pos	Nat	Player	Total		Allsvenskan		2017–18 Svenska Cupen		2018–19 Svenska Cupen		UEFA Europa League	
No.	Pos	Nat	Player	Apps	Goals	Apps	Goals	Apps	Goals	Apps	Goals	Apps	Goals
1	GK	(Sweden) SWE	Andreas Isaksson	32	0	24	0	6	0	0	0	2	0
2	DF	(Sweden) SWE	Johan Andersson	6	0	0+3	0	0+1	0	1	0	0+1	0
3	DF	(Sweden) SWE	Marcus Danielson	30	3	25	2	1+1	0	1	1	1+1	0
4	DF	(Sweden) SWE	Jacob Une Larsson	33	3	23+1	1	6	1	1	1	1+1	0
5	DF	(Norway) NOR	Niklas Gunnarsson	28	1	12+8	0	3+3	1	1	0	1	0
6	MF	(Sweden) SWE	Jesper Karlström	34	1	20+5	0	6	0	1	1	2	0
7	MF	(Sweden) SWE	Dženis Kozica	36	3	12+16	3	5+1	0	1	0	0+1	0
8	MF	(Sweden) SWE	Kevin Walker	29	3	13+8	2	3+2	1	1	0	0+2	0
9	MF	(Bosnia and Herzegovina) BIH	Haris Radetinac	35	4	20+7	2	5	2	1	0	2	0
10	MF	(Sweden) SWE	Kerim Mrabti	33	9	23+1	6	6	3	0+1	0	2	0
11	MF	(Sweden) SWE	Jonathan Ring	36	5	21+8	4	2+2	1	1	0	2	0
12	FW	(Sweden) SWE	Omar Eddahri	6	0	4+2	0	0	0	0	0	0	0
13	DF	(Sweden) SWE	Jonas Olsson	27	0	18+1	0	6	0	0	0	1+1	0
14	MF	(Sweden) SWE	Besard Sabovic	3	0	0+2	0	0	0	0+1	0	0	0
15	DF	(Sweden) SWE	Jonathan Augustinsson	33	2	26	1	5	1	0	0	2	0
17	MF	(Sweden) SWE	Hampus Finndell	1	0	0	0	0+1	0	0	0	0	0
18	MF	(Zambia) ZAM	Edward Chilufya	10	1	0+8	0	0+1	0	1	1	0	0
19	MF	(Sweden) SWE	Nicklas Bärkroth	14	0	12+2	0	0	0	0	0	0	0
20	FW	(Senegal) SEN	Aliou Badji	34	10	16+12	8	0+3	0	0+1	0	2	2
21	DF	(Sweden) SWE	Erik Johansson	13	0	9+2	0	0	0	0	0	2	0
23	MF	(Norway) NOR	Fredrik Ulvestad	30	1	22+1	1	3+2	0	0	0	2	0
30	GK	(Sweden) SWE	Tommi Vaiho	8	0	6+1	0	0	0	1	0	0	0
Players away from Djurgårdens on loan:
Players who left Djurgårdens during the season:
19	FW	(Armenia) ARM	Yura Movsisyan	4	0	1+3	0	0	0	0	0	0	0
22	DF	(Sweden) SWE	Felix Beijmo	15	1	11	1	3+1	0	0	0	0	0
24	FW	(Zimbabwe) ZIM	Tino Kadewere	18	12	12	8	6	4	0	0	0	0

=== Goal scorers ===
Place	Position	Nation	Number	Name	Allsvenskan	2017–18 Svenska Cupen	2018–19 Svenska Cupen	UEFA Europa League	Total
1	FW	(Zimbabwe)	24	Tino Kadewere	8	4	0	0	12
2	FW	(Senegal)	20	Aliou Badji	8	0	0	2	10
3	MF	(Sweden)	10	Kerim Mrabti	6	3	0	0	9
4	MF	(Sweden)	11	Jonathan Ring	4	1	0	0	5
5	MF	(Bosnia and Herzegovina)	9	Haris Radetinac	2	2	0	0	4
6	MF	(Sweden)	7	Dženis Kozica	3	0	0	0	3
6	MF	(Sweden)	8	Kevin Walker	2	1	0	0	3
6	DF	(Sweden)	3	Marcus Danielsson	2	0	1	0	3
6	DF	(Norway)	4	Jacob Une Larsson	1	1	1	0	3
10	DF	(Sweden)	15	Jonathan Augustinsson	1	1	0	0	2
11	DF	(Sweden)	22	Felix Beijmo	1	0	0	0	1
11	MF	(Norway)	23	Fredrik Ulvestad	1	0	0	0	1
11	DF	(Norway)	5	Niklas Gunnarsson	0	1	0	0	1
11	MF	(Sweden)	6	Jesper Karlström	0	0	1	0	1
11	MF	(Zambia)	18	Edward Chilufya	0	0	1	0	1
				TOTALS	40	14	4	2	60

=== Disciplinary record ===
Number	Nation	Position	Name	Allsvenskan		2017–18 Svenska Cupen		2018–19 Svenska Cupen		UEFA Europa League		Total	
Number	Nation	Position	Name	Yellow card	Red card	Yellow card	Red card	Yellow card	Red card	Yellow card	Red card	Yellow card	Red card
1	(Sweden)	GK	Andreas Isaksson	1	0	0	0	0	0	0	0	1	0
3	(Sweden)	DF	Marcus Danielsson	4	0	0	0	0	0	0	0	4	0
4	(Sweden)	DF	Jacob Une Larsson	5	0	0	0	0	0	0	0	5	0
5	(Norway)	DF	Niklas Gunnarsson	5	0	0	0	0	0	0	0	5	0
6	(Sweden)	MF	Jesper Karlström	3	0	3	0	0	0	1	0	7	0
8	(Sweden)	MF	Kevin Walker	2	0	0	0	0	0	1	0	3	0
9	(Bosnia and Herzegovina)	MF	Haris Radetinac	0	0	0	0	0	0	1	0	1	0
10	(Sweden)	MF	Kerim Mrabti	3	0	1	0	0	0	1	0	5	0
11	(Sweden)	MF	Jonathan Ring	1	0	0	0	0	0	1	0	2	0
13	(Sweden)	DF	Jonas Olsson	8	1	1	0	0	0	2	0	11	1
15	(Sweden)	DF	Jonathan Augustinsson	5	0	1	0	0	0	1	0	7	0
19	(Sweden)	MF	Nicklas Bärkroth	1	0	0	0	0	0	0	0	1	0
20	(Senegal)	FW	Aliou Badji	3	0	0	0	0	0	1	0	4	0
21	(Sweden)	DF	Erik Johansson	3	0	0	0	0	0	0	0	3	0
22	(Sweden)	DF	Felix Beijmo	1	0	0	0	0	0	0	0	1	0
23	(Norway)	MF	Fredrik Ulvestad	5	0	0	0	0	0	1	0	6	0
Players who left Djurgårdens IF during the season:
19	(Armenia)	FW	Yura Movsisyan	0	1	0	0	0	0	0	0	0	1
24	(Zimbabwe)	FW	Tino Kadewere	1	0	1	0	0	0	0	0	2	0
			TOTALS	50	2	7	0	0	0	9	0	66	2
