= Hampus Finndell =

Swedish footballer

Personal information
- Date of birth: 6 June 2000 (age 26)
- Place of birth: Västerås, Sweden
- Height: 1.77 m (5 ft 10 in)
- Position: Central midfielder

Team information
- Current team: Jagiellonia Białystok
- Number: 14

Youth career
- –2012: IK Franke
- 2012–2016: IF Brommapojkarna
- 2016–2017: Groningen

Senior career*
Years	Team	Apps	(Gls)
2018–2024	Djurgårdens IF	80	(13)
2020	→ Dalkurd FF (loan)	25	(0)
2024	→ Eintracht Braunschweig (loan)	9	(0)
2024	Viking	11	(0)
2025–2026	Djurgårdens IF	23	(1)
2026–	Jagiellonia Białystok	3	(0)

International career
2015–2017	Sweden U17	16	(2)
2017–2018	Sweden U19	9	(0)
2021–2022	Sweden U21	3	(0)
- * Club domestic league appearances and goals as of 18:55, 20 September 2026 (UTC)

Hampus Finndell (born 6 June 2000) is a Swedish professional footballer who plays as a central midfielder for Ekstraklasa club Jagiellonia Białystok.

== Career ==
=== Youth career ===
Finndell started out playing for IK Franke in Västerås before moving to Stockholm and IF Brommapojkarna. In 2016, he moved to the Netherlands, joining former IF Brommapojkarna player Simon Tibbling at FC Groningen.

=== Djurgårdens IF ===
On 20 December 2017, Finndell signed a four-year deal with Allsvenskan side Djurgårdens IF. On 15 May 2019, he made his debut in Allsvenskan coming on as a substitute in a 3–0 victory against Falkenbergs FF.

On 1 February 2024, the last day of the German transfer window, Finndell joined 2. Bundesliga club Eintracht Braunschweig on loan until the end of the season. Braunschweig also secured an option to sign him permanently.

== Career statistics ==
As of match played 16 September 2026

Appearances and goals by club, season and competition
Club	Season	League			National cup (Note: Includes Svenska Cupen, DFB Pokal, Norwegian Cup)		Continental		Other		Total	
Club	Season	Division	Apps	Goals	Apps	Goals	Apps	Goals	Apps	Goals	Apps	Goals
Djurgårdens IF	2018	Allsvenskan	0	0	1	0	0	0	—		1	0
Djurgårdens IF	2019	Allsvenskan	3	0	1	0	—		—		4	0
Djurgårdens IF	2021	Allsvenskan	26	3	5	0	—		—		31	3
Djurgårdens IF	2022	Allsvenskan	27	5	6	0	13 (Note: Appearance(s) in UEFA Conference League)	2	—		46	7
Djurgårdens IF	2023	Allsvenskan	24	5	6	1	2	0	—		32	6
Djurgårdens IF	Total		80	13	19	1	15	2	—		114	16
Dalkurd FF (loan)	2020	Superettan	25	0	4	0	—		1 (Note: Appearance(s) in Superettan promotion/relegation play-offs)	0	30	0
Eintracht Braunschweig (loan)	2023-24	2. Bundesliga	9	0	0	0	—		—		9	0
Viking	2024	Eliteserien	11	0	0	0	—		—		11	0
Viking 2	2024	Norwegian Second Division	1	0	—		—		—		1	0
Djurgårdens IF	2025	Allsvenskan	8	0	2	0	6	0	—		16	0
Djurgårdens IF	2026	Allsvenskan	15	1	3	0	—		—		18	1
Djurgårdens IF	Total		23	1	5	0	6	0	—		34	1
Jagiellonia Białystok	2026–27	Ekstraklasa	3	0	0	0	1 (Note: Appearance in UEFA Europa League)	0	—		4	0
Career total			152	14	28	1	22	2	1	0	203	17

== Honours ==
Djurgårdens IF

- Allsvenskan: 2019
- Svenska Cupen: 2017–18
