= Juventus IF =

- Full name: Juventus Idrottsförening
- Founded: 1948
- Dissolved: 2016
- Ground: Råby IP; Västerås; Sweden
Home colours	Away colours

Juventus IF was a Swedish football club located in Västerås. They merged into IFK Stocksund in 2016. 2019 Allsvenskan top scorer Mohamed Buya Turay represented the club at the start of his senior career.

== Background ==
Juventus Idrottsförening (Juventus Athletic Association) was formed in 1948 in by Italians who came to Sweden during the 1940s, and the name referred to Juventus FC from Turin in Italy.

Their biggest sporting success came under the management team headed by chairman Franco Pertunaj. In 2008 Juventus IF won the "triple" by gaining promotion to Division 4, winning the VLT Cup and also winning the DM (district championship) in Futsal. In 2011 another significant achievement was made by gaining promotion via the play-offs to Division 3.

They played their home matches at the Råby IP in Västerås.

The club was affiliated to Västmanlands Fotbollförbund.

== Season to season ==
Season	Level	Division	Section	Position	Movements
1999	Tier 7	Division 6	Västmanland Östra	2nd	
2000	Tier 7	Division 6	Västmanland	11th	Relegated
2001	Tier 8	Division 7	Västmanland	1st	Promoted
2002	Tier 7	Division 6	Västmanland	6th	
2003	Tier 7	Division 6	Västmanland	1st	Promoted
2004	Tier 6	Division 5	Västmanland	4th	Promoted
2005	Tier 5	Division 4	Västmanland	12th	Relegated
2006*	Tier 7	Division 5	Västmanland	10th	
2007	Tier 7	Division 5	Västmanland	5th	
2008	Tier 7	Division 5	Västmanland	2nd	Promoted
2009	Tier 6	Division 4	Västmanland	5th	
2010	Tier 6	Division 4	Västmanland	5th	
2011	Tier 6	Division 4	Västmanland	2nd	Promotion Playoffs – Promoted
2012	Tier 5	Division 3	Södra Svealand	6th	
2013	Tier 5	Division 3	Södra Svealand	7th	
2014	Tier 5	Division 3	Västra Svealand	4th	
2015	Tier 5	Division 3	Östra Svealand		

* League restructuring in 2006 resulted in a new division being created at Tier 3 and subsequent divisions dropping a level.
