= Mohamed Buya Turay =

Sierra Leonean footballer

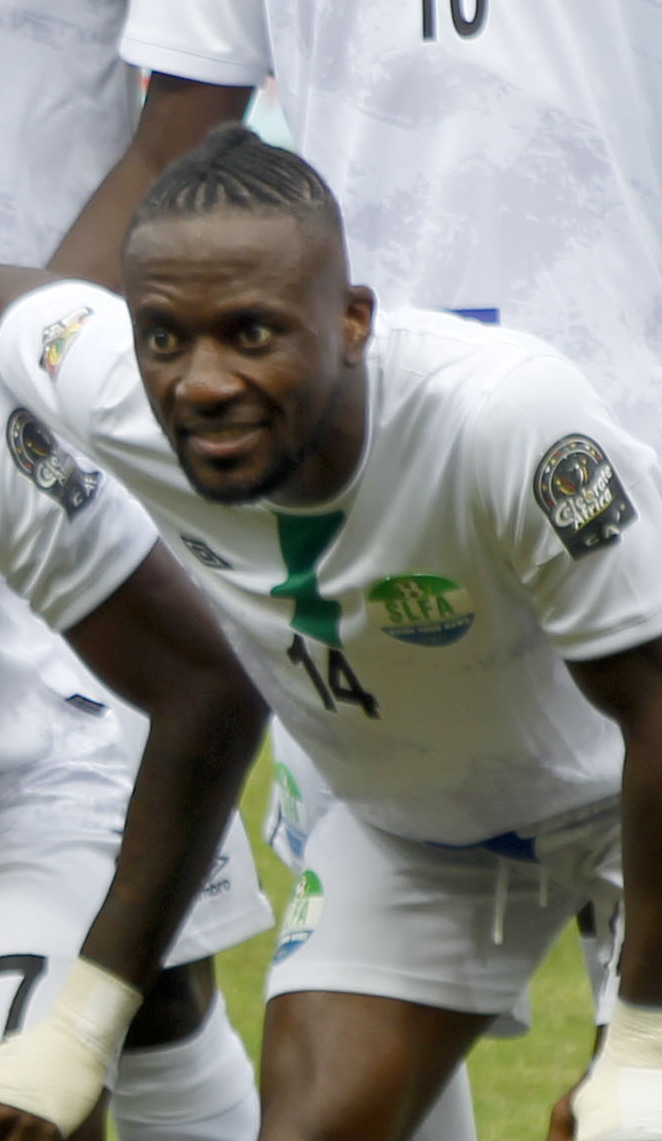
- Turay with Sierra Leone in 2022

Personal information
- Full name: Mohamed Buya Turay
- Date of birth: 10 January 1995 (age 31)
- Place of birth: Freetown, Sierra Leone
- Height: 1.78 m (5 ft 10 in)
- Position: Forward

Team information
- Current team: Zhetysu
- Number: 95

Youth career
- FC Mattia

Senior career*
Years	Team	Apps	(Gls)
2013–2014	Juventus IF	25	(32)
2014	Västerås SK	9	(4)
2015–2017	AFC Eskilstuna	55	(19)
2018	Dalkurd FF	13	(9)
2018–2020	Sint-Truiden	6	(1)
2019	→ Djurgårdens IF (loan)	29	(15)
2020	Hebei China Fortune	16	(5)
2021–2022	Henan Songshan Longmen	8	(1)
2022	Malmö FF	10	(1)
2023	OB	13	(1)
2024–2025	Birmingham Legion	1	(0)
2025–	Zhetysu	7	(1)

International career^{‡}
2017–	Sierra Leone	20	(3)
- * Club domestic league appearances and goals as of 2 November 2025 ‡ National team caps and goals as of 2 November 2025

Mohamed Buya Turay (/tʊˈreɪ/, tuu-RAY; born 10 January 1995) is a Sierra Leonean professional footballer who plays as a forward for Kazakhstan Premier League club Zhetysu.

== Club career ==
=== Early career ===
Born in Freetown, Sierra Leone, Turay began playing football on the streets, which led him to be scouted by FC Mattia, who signed him. According to Turay, he said: "one of the club's coaches gave him bus money so he could go to training. But I ran to training instead. I was small and needed to train to get stronger. I took the money and bought food for the family." His performance attracted by Academie Sante Marie De Dixinn (an academy based in Guinea), who scouted and offered him a contract, but FC Mattia refused. Turay, once again, was scouted by Academy Director Numukeh Tunkara, who then took him to Sweden for a trial. Initially, his trial at Vasalund wasn't a positive one, as the club's management felt he wasn't good enough. As a result, Turay travelled to Nigeria to have another trial. But Patrick Mörk, an agent, was aware of his talent and contacted Juventus IF to sign him, leading an extension of his tourist visa, so he can play in Sweden. When Turay first arrived in Sweden, he struggled in the country with no food to eat and had to rely from his agent to drive him anywhere he went. Despite this, Turay quickly made an impact in the club, scoring twenty goals in eleven matches at the end of the 2013 season. This resulted in him seeing interest from clubs such as Standard Liège, Gefle IF and Assyriska. The 2014 season saw Turay continuing to make an impact, making fourteen appearances and scoring twelve times. Throughout his time at Juventus IF, he went on to make twenty–five appearances and scoring thirty–two times.

In August 2014, Turay joined Västerås SK. However, the move was disputed as there was a disagreement between Juventus IF and Västerås SK over the transfer move. As a result, the agreement resulted in him joining the club on loan, though Västerås SK sports manager Ado Sadzak opinioned that the loan agreement should not have existed as it's not possible to loan a player when they have no contract. He quickly made an impact for the club against Östersunds FK in Svenska Cupen on 20 August 2014 and scored twice in a 3–1 win. Turay went on to score four more goals, coming between 4 October 2014 and 18 October 2014. With his playing time coming from the substitute bench by the time 2014 season ended, he went on to make nine appearances and scoring six times in all competitions for Västerås SK. Following this, Turay left Västerås SK.

=== AFC United/AFC Eskilstuna ===
On 19 August 2015, it was announced that Turay joined Superettan side AFC United. The club wanted to sign him earlier this year but his player license resulted in him remaining with Västerås SK at the time. He made his debut for AFC United, coming on as an 81st-minute substitute, in a 0–0 draw against Mjällby on 23 August 2015. Turay later made two more appearances, both coming as a substitute later in the 2015 season.

At the start of the 2016 season, Turay began to establish himself in the first team as AFC United's first choice striker. He then scored his first goal for the club, in a 2–0 win against Assyriska on 11 May 2016. Two weeks later on 29 May 2016, Turay scored a hat–trick for AFC United, in a 3–1 win against Syrianska. He later scored six more goals later in the 2016 season, including a brace against Degerfors on 27 September 2016. Turay later helped the club reach promotion to the top–flight league next season. At the end of the 2016 season, he went on to make thirty–three appearances and scoring ten times in all competitions. Following this, Turay signed a three-year contract extension with AFC United. It came after his performance attracted interests from clubs, both Sweden and around Europe.

At the start of the 2017 season, with AFC United, which now go under AFC Eskilstuna, Turay started the season well when he scored twice against Örebro and this was followed up by scoring against IFK Göteborg. However in a match against Östersund on 23 April 2017, Turay received a straight red card at the last minutes for a foul on Dennis Widgren, as the club lost 3–1. After serving a two match suspension, he returned to the starting line–up against IFK Norrköping on 12 May 2017 and set up AFC Eskilstuna's only goal of the game, in a 2–1 loss. Turay, once again, followed up by setting up a goal for the club's only goal of the game, in a 2–1 loss against Elfsborg. His next goal came on 31 July 2017 when he scored against Djurgårdens IF, as AFC Eskilstuna lost 2–1. A week later on 13 August 2017, Turay scored his fifth goal of the season against IFK Göteborg. This was followed up by scoring twice against Malmö and once against Vasalunds, in which he was sent–off once again. His performance throughout August resulted in him being nominated for the league's Player of the Month. A month later on 25 September 2017, Turay set up AFC Eskilstuna's only goal of the game, in a 1–0 win against IFK Göteborg. This was followed up by scoring his tenth goal of the season, in a 1–1 draw against Jönköpings Södra. In a follow–up match against BK Häcken, however, he was sent–off in the 39th minute for an unprofessional foul on Rasmus Lindgren, as the club lost 3–0, in what turned out to be his last appearance. As a result of his four match suspension, AFC Eskilstuna were relegated back to Superettan after Jönköpings Södra IF defeated Kalmar 2–0, meaning the club could no longer reach the qualifying position. Throughout the 2017 season, Turay continued to establish himself as the AFC Eskilstuna's first choice striker despite being suspended four times. At the end of the 2017 season, he went on to make twenty–four appearances and scoring ten times in all competitions, making him the club's top scorer.

Turay's performance continued to attract interests from clubs, both Sweden and around Europe, leading to making bids to sign him. On 21 March 2018, it was reported that Dalkurd FF agreed to sign him.

=== Dalkurd FF ===
It was announced on 23 March 2018 that Turay signed for newly promoted Allsvenskan side Dalkurd FF on a three–year contract. Upon joining the club, he said: "I'm very happy because this was what I was waiting for. I have been waiting so long to find out where I will play. Now I'm in Dalkurd, I'm happy to be here. I will do my thing and do what is best for the club, as always."

Turay scored on his debut for Dalkurd against Östersunds on 8 April 2018 by scoring twice, in a 3–0 win. He then scored three goals in three matches between 22 April 2018 and 6 May 2018 against GIF Sundsvall, Örebro and Kalmar. Turay later scored four more goals for the club, including a brace against Brommapojkarna on 7 July 2018. By the time he departed from Dalkurd, Turay went on to make thirteen appearances and scoring nine times in all competitions. His performance at the club, once again, attracted interests from clubs, both Sweden and around Europe.

=== Sint-Truiden ===
It was announced on 8 August 2018 that Turay joined Jupiler League side Sint-Truiden on a three–year contract with a reported undisclosed fee. As part of the transfer move, his former club, AFC Eskilstuna, received compensation as a result. He previously stated in an interview of his intention to leaving Sweden after 2018.

Turay made his debut for the club against Lokeren on 11 August 2018 and scored his first goal, in a 1–1 draw. In a follow–up match against Waasland-Beveren, he made his first start for Sint-Truiden, playing 74 minutes before being substituted, in a 2–2 draw. However, Turay found his first team opportunities limited, as he was placed on the substitute bench. By the time Turay left the club, he went on to make seven appearances and scoring once in all competitions.

Upon returning to his parent club, Turay announced his intention to Sint-Truiden that he would not play for the club again. It came after when both parties weren't on good terms.

==== Loan to Djurgårdens IF ====
It was announced on 9 January 2019 that Turay was loaned out to Allsvenskan side Djurgårdens IF for the rest of the 2019 season. Upon joining the club, he announced his intention to become the best player in the league and aim to help Djurgårdens IF lead their success.

He made his debut for the club in the opening game of the season against GIF Sundsvall and scored his first goal, in a 2–2 draw. This was followed up by scoring in the next two matches against Örebro and IFK Göteborg. His next goal for Djurgårdens IF came on 28 April 2019 against Hammarby, as the club lost 2–1; which was followed up by scoring in a 1–1 draw against Helsingborg. During a 2–0 win against Elfsborg on 19 May 2019 (in which Turay set up a goal for Fredrik Ulvestad, who scored in the match), he attempted a bicycle kick, which resulted in him hit Joakim Nilsson's face and was substituted as a result. After the match, however, Turay received racial abuse from his social media accounts.

Since joining Djurgårdens IF, Turay quickly established himself in the first team, playing as the club's first choice striker. His performance led to transfer speculation that he could leave Djurgårdens IF in the summer but both the club's sporting Bo Andersson and the player, himself, dismissed this from happening. Amid the transfer speculation, Turay scored two goals in two matches between 1 July 2019 and 8 July 2019 against Kalmar and AFC Eskilstuna. A month later, he, once again, scored three goals in three consecutive matches between 10 August 2019 and 25 August 2019 against IK Sirius, AFC Eskilstuna and Malmö. Turay appeared in every match since joining Djurgårdens IF until he missed one match through a yellow card suspension. After serving a one match suspension, Turay returned to the starting line–up against Falkenberg on 24 September 2019 and scored the club's only goal of the game, in a 1–0 win. He then scored three more goals between 6 October 2019 and 28 October 2019, coming against Hammarby, IFK Göteborg and Örebro. In the last game of the season against IFK Norrköping, Turay scored the equalising goal, in a 2–2 draw, resulting in Djurgårdens IF winning the league for the first time since 2005, with a draw to win the league against title contenders, Malmö and Hammarby. At the end of the 2019 season, he went on to make twenty–nine appearances and scoring fifteen times in all competitions. For his performance, Turay was awarded the league's Golden Boot. He also nominated for Forward of the Year at the Allsvenskan Grand Prix ceremony but lost out to Nikola Đurđić.

Following this, Turay wanted to stay at Djurgårdens IF on a permanent basis. However, he was expected to leave the club at the end of the 2019 season, due to his high values. It was announced on 25 December 2019 that Turay would be officially leaving Djurgårdens IF.

=== Hebei China Fortune ===
On 19 July 2020, it was announced that Turay transferred to Chinese club Hebei China Fortune. He was previously linked a move to European clubs, including a rumoured return to Djurgårdens IF.

Turay made his debut for the club against Chongqing Dangdai Lifan on 7 August 2020, coming on as a 72nd-minute substitute, in a 2–2 draw. This was followed up by setting two goals in the next two matches before scoring his first goal for Hebei China Fortune, in a 3–1 win against Wuhan Zall on 21 August 2020. Since joining the club, he spoke about settling in the country. In a match against Beijing Sinobo Guoan, Turay set up two goals for Hebei China Fortune, as the club drew 3–3 on 15 September 2020. This was followed up by scoring two goals in the next two matches against Wuhan Zall. In the league's play–offs against Shandong Taishan, he scored in both legs (including twice in the second leg), as Hebei China Fortune lost 8–5 on aggregate. At the end of the 2020 season, Turay went on to make seventeen appearances and scoring six times in all competitions. His performance was praised by the Chinese media, stating: "After a season, Turay handed over a beautiful record of 6 goals and 5 assists. This is inseparable from his hard work and conscientious attitude."

=== Birmingham Legion FC ===
After a disappointing stay at Danish Superliga club Odense Boldklub, where he managed to score three goals in 16 games in six months, Turay signed on 30 January 2024 with the American USL Championship side Birmingham Legion FC.

== International career ==
In June 2017, Turay was called-up in the Sierra Leone for the first time in a match against Kenya but did not play. A year later, he was called-up in the national team again. Turay made his Sierra Leone debut, starting a match and played 61 minutes before being substituted, in a 1–0 loss against Ethiopia on 9 September 2018.

In August 2019, Turay was called-up in the national team for the first time in almost over a year. He played in both legs of the World Cup qualifying round against Liberia, as Sierra Leone lost 3–2 on aggregate. The following year, Turay played in both matches against Nigeria, as the national team went on to drew 2–2 in the African Cup of Nations Qualifications.

== Personal life ==
Growing up, Buya is the youngest child in his family and has two siblings. He grew up with a single mother, as his father moved up north to work in the diamond mines. Because his mother worked at school as a teacher, she, however, did not allow Buya play football, preferring her children to focus on education instead. Because his mother did not want him to play football, he received football shoes from his friends to go to training and did this without his mother knowledge. While at school, Turay participated in athletics competitions, running both long and short distances. He then completed his education at elementary school and was about to study high school in the next semester. However, Turay did not want to study, preferring to pursue his dream as a professional footballer. Once his mother found out about his dream as a professional footballer, this led the pair to fall out, resulting in him moving out and lived in a city streets. As a result of falling out, he and his mother did not speak for two months.

In April 2018, Turay announced that he was going to be a father for the first time, with his baby daughter was born in July. During his time at Djurgårdens IF, teammate Edward Chilufya consider Turay to be his best friend and a brother to him, having taken care of him since they first met. According to his agent, he said that Turay considered Sweden to be his home. Turay is a Christian and pray on a daily basis.

In November 2019, Turay suffered from an injury which he alleged was caused by 'black magic'. In September 2020, Turay revealed that police searched his belongings when he was travelling from Denmark to Sweden and it left him humiliated once the search was conducted.

Turay married in October 2022; his brother stood in for him as 'groom' during the ceremony as Turay was at football training.

== Career statistics ==
As of match played 10 March 2024

Appearances and goals by club, season and competition
Club	Season	League			National cup		Continental		Other		Total	
Club	Season	Division	Apps	Goals	Apps	Goals	Apps	Goals	Apps	Goals	Apps	Goals
Juventus IF	2013	Division 3	11	20	—		—		—		11	20
Juventus IF	2014	Division 3	14	12	—		—		—		14	12
Juventus IF	Total		25	32	0	0	0	0	0	0	25	35
Västerås SK	2014	Division 1	9	4	1	2	—		—		10	6
AFC Eskilstuna	2015	Superettan	3	0	3	0	—		—		6	0
AFC Eskilstuna	2016	Superettan	29	10	1	0	—		—		30	10
AFC Eskilstuna	2017	Allsvenskan	23	9	1	1	—		—		24	10
AFC Eskilstuna	Total		55	19	5	1	0	0	0	0	60	20
Dalkurd FF	2018	Allsvenskan	13	9	0	0	—		—		13	9
Sint-Truiden	2018–19	Belgian First Division A	6	1	1	0	—		—		7	1
Djurgårdens IF (loan)	2019	Allsvenskan	29	15	2	1	—		—		31	16
Hebei China Fortune	2020	Chinese Super League	16	5	1	1	—		—		17	6
Henan Songshan Longmen	2021	Chinese Super League	8	1	4	0	—		—		12	1
Malmö FF	2022	Allsvenskan	10	1	1	0	5 (Note: Appearance(s) in UEFA Europa League)	1	—		16	2
OB	2023–24	Danish Superliga	13	1	3	2	—		—		16	3
Birmingham Legion	2024	USL Championship	1	0	—		—		—		1	0
Career total			185	88	18	7	5	1	0	0	208	95

== Honours ==
Djurgården

- Allsvenskan: 2019

Individual

- Allsvenskan top scorer: 2019
