= IFK Stocksund =

- Full name: Idrottsföreningen Kamraterna Stocksund
- Founded: 2005
- Ground: Stockhagens IP, Stocksund
- Capacity: 1,000
- Chairman: Shervin Razani
- Manager: Adam Gürsoy
- League: Ettan Fotboll
- 2025: 12th of 16
- Website: www.ifkstocksund.se

Idrottsföreningen Kamraterna Stocksund is a Swedish association football club from Stocksund.

The club was founded in 2005 as a club for youth exclusively. Over time, the club added senior teams for men and women. In 2016, the men's team took over the license of Juventus IF in the Division 3. The club was bankrolled by millionaire Karsten Inde, who set a goal of gaining successive promotions and playing in the 2021 Allsvenskan.

The men's football team plays in the Division 1, the third tier of Swedish football. The women's team plays in Division 2.

== Current squad ==
As of 1 September 2026

Note: Flags indicate national team as defined under FIFA eligibility rules; some limited exceptions apply. Players may hold more than one non-FIFA nationality.

No.	Pos.	Nation	Player
1	GK	SWE	Villy Strindlund (on loan from Sirius)
2	DF	SWE	Axel Floric
3	DF	SWE	Luka Daniel Mihajlovic
4	DF	SWE	Charlie Jonsson
5	DF	CAN	Max Vogele
6	MF	SWE	Endreas Tesfai
6	MF	SWE	Sebastian Lager
7	MF	SWE	Danial Hussein
8	DF	SWE	Dary Boto
9	MF	SWE	Noel Wagberg
9	FW	SWE	Yosef Rauf
10	FW	SWE	Kasper Engström
11	MF	SWE	Langston Wennerlind
12	MF	SWE	Carl Selfvén (on loan from Djurgården)

No.	Pos.	Nation	Player
13	MF	SWE	Eric Rylander
14	DF	SWE	Claus Royo
15	FW	GHA	Abdul Latif Mumuni
16	MF	ZAM	James Nene Sibeene
17	DF	SWE	Jack Pierrou Bengtsson
18	MF	SWE	Soheib Amin Badome
19	FW	SWE	Nasim Maache
20	DF	SWE	Eskil Bodvik
21	MF	FRA	Enzo Mougnol
22	FW	ZAM	Robert Banda
23	DF	SWE	Emil Persson
27	DF	SWE	Ben Magnusson (on loan from Sirius)
31	GK	SWE	Jakob Rhawi
—	FW	CIV	Jean-Paul Sanoko
