= Kim Bergstrand =

Swedish football coach (born 1968)

Personal information
- Full name: Kim Hilding Bergstrand
- Date of birth: 18 April 1968 (age 58)
- Place of birth: Täby, Stockholm, Sweden
- Height: 1.80 m (5 ft 11 in)
- Position: Striker

Youth career
- 1974–1982: IFK Täby
- 1983–1985: AIK

Senior career*
| Years | Team | Apps | (Gls) |
| 1986–1994 | AIK | 148 | (30) |
| 1995–1998 | Hammarby IF | 84 | (28) |
| 1998–2001 | Nacka FF | 40 | (25) |
| 2001–2002 | Brommapojkarna | 21 | (3) |
| Total | | 293 | (86) |

International career
| 1987 | Sweden U21 | 1 | (0) |

Managerial career
- 2001: Nacka FF
- 2002–2007: Brommapojkarna (U19)
- 2008–2010: Brommapojkarna
- 2012–2018: IK Sirius
- 2018–2024: Djurgårdens IF
- * Club domestic league appearances and goals

Kim Hilding Bergstrand (born 18 April 1968) is a Swedish football coach.

== Career ==
=== Playing career ===
Bergstrand played for AIK, Hammarby IF, Nacka FF and IF Brommapojkarna. He became Swedish champion by winning 1992 Mästerskapsserien with AIK.

=== Managerial career ===
Between 2008 and 2010, Kim Bergstrand was the manager of IF Brommapojkarna. In 2012, Kim Bergstrand and Thomas Lagerlöf became managers of IK Sirius.

Before the 2019 season, Kim Bergstrand and Thomas Lagerlöf became managers of Djurgårdens IF. Bergstrand and Lagerlöf managed the team to a Swedish title their first season. In 2022, they took Djurgården to their first European group stage, the 2022–23 UEFA Europa Conference League.

== Honours ==
=== Player ===
AIK

- Swedish Champion: 1992

=== Manager ===
Djurgårdens IF

- Allsvenskan: 2019
