= Jonathan Ring =

Swedish footballer (born 1991)

Personal information
- Full name: Erik Jonathan Ring
- Date of birth: 5 December 1991 (age 34)
- Place of birth: Örebro, Sweden
- Height: 1.82 m (6 ft 0 in)
- Position: Winger

Team information
- Current team: Västerås SK
- Number: 10

Youth career
- Adolfsbergs IK
- Örebro SK

Senior career*
Years	Team	Apps	(Gls)
2011–2012	IFK Värnamo	52	(11)
2013–2016	Kalmar FF	85	(8)
2017	Gençlerbirliği	6	(0)
2017	Kalmar FF	15	(4)
2018–2020	Djurgårdens IF	82	(11)
2021	Kalmar FF	28	(8)
2022–2023	Jeju United	39	(5)
2024	Kalmar FF	29	(4)
2025–	Västerås SK	37	(5)
- * Club domestic league appearances and goals as of 8 July 2026

Jonathan Ring (born 5 December 1991) is a Swedish professional footballer who plays for Västerås SK as a winger.

== Club career ==
On 10 May 2018, Ring scored as Djurgårdens IF beat Malmö FF 3–0 in the Swedish Cup final.

On 25 January 2022, he joined Jeju United FC of K League 1.

== Personal life ==
Jonathan grew up in a sports-oriented family in Örebro, Närke. He is the brother of fellow footballer Sebastian Ring.

== Career statistics ==
As of match played 23 October 2022

Appearances and goals by club, season and competition
Club	Season	League			National cup		Continental		Other		Total	
Club	Season	Division	Apps	Goals	Apps	Goals	Apps	Goals	Apps	Goals	Apps	Goals
IFK Värnamo	2011	Superettan	27	5	2	0	–		–		29	5
IFK Värnamo	2012	Superettan	25	6	1	0	–		0	0	26	6
IFK Värnamo	Total		52	11	3	0	–		–		55	11
Kalmar FF	2013	Allsvenskan	15	1	1	0	–		–		16	1
Kalmar FF	2014	Allsvenskan	23	1	1	0	–		–		24	1
Kalmar FF	2015	Allsvenskan	19	1	0	0	–		–		19	1
Kalmar FF	2016	Allsvenskan	28	5	4	0	–		–		32	5
Kalmar FF	Total		85	8	6	0	0	0	0	0	91	8
Gençlerbirliği	2016–17	Süper Lig	6	0	2	0	–		–		8	0
Kalmar FF	2017	Allsvenskan	15	4	0	0	–		–		15	4
Djurgårdens IF	2018	Allsvenskan	29	4	5	1	2	0	–		36	5
Djurgårdens IF	2019	Allsvenskan	29	7	5	0	–		–		34	7
Djurgårdens IF	2020	Allsvenskan	24	0	1	0	2	0	–		27	0
Djurgårdens IF	Total		82	11	11	1	4	0	–		97	12
Kalmar FF	2021	Allsvenskan	28	8	2	1	–		–		30	9
Jeju United	2022	K League 1	28	5	2	0	–		–		30	5
Career total			281	43	26	2	4	0	0	0	311	45

== Honours ==
Djurgårdens IF

- Allsvenskan: 2019
- Svenska Cupen: 2017–18
