= Johan Andersson (footballer, born June 1995) =

Swedish footballer (born 1995)

Personal information
- Full name: Carl Johan Josef Andersson
- Date of birth: 15 June 1995 (age 31)
- Place of birth: Uppsala, Sweden
- Height: 1.76 m (5 ft 9 1/2 in)
- Position: Right-back

Youth career
- –2011: Vaksala SK
- 2011–2014: IK Sirius

Senior career*
Years	Team	Apps	(Gls)
2014–2017	IK Sirius	75	(8)
2018–2021	Djurgårdens IF	2	(0)
2019	→ Karlstad BK (loan)	8	(4)
2020	→ GIF Sundsvall (loan)	26	(1)
2021	GAIS	26	(0)

International career
2015	Sweden U19	1	(0)
- * Club domestic league appearances and goals as of 21:43, 7 January 2022 (UTC)

Johan Andersson (born 15 June 1995) is a Swedish football player who plays as a right-back.

== Honours ==
=== Club ===
Djurgården

- Allsvenskan: 2019
