= Jonathan Augustinsson =

Swedish footballer (born 1996)

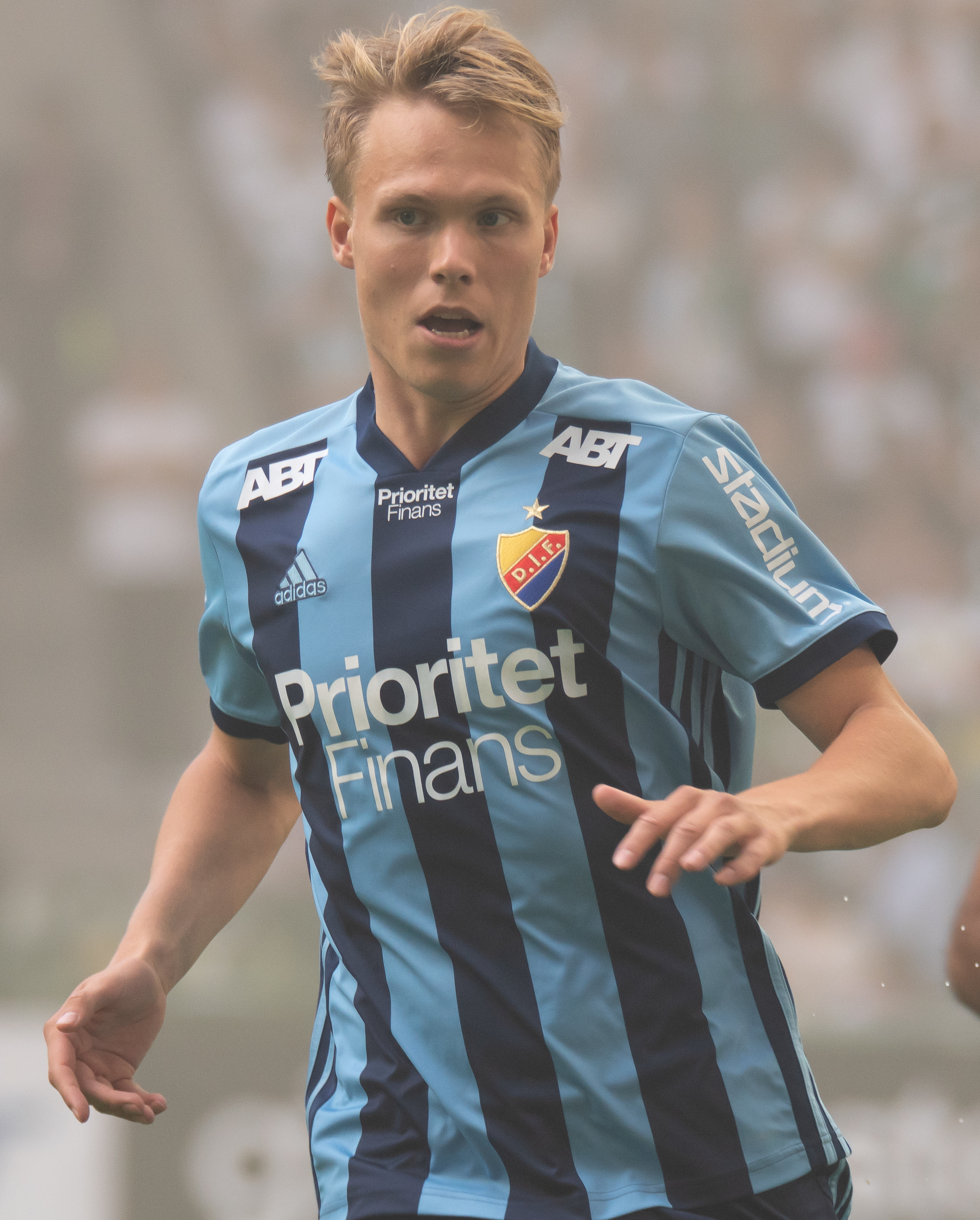
- Augustinsson with Djurgårdens IF in 2018

Personal information
- Full name: Hans Oskar Jonathan Augustinsson
- Date of birth: 30 March 1996 (age 30)
- Place of birth: Stockholm, Sweden
- Height: 1.85 m (6 ft 1 in)
- Position: Left-back

Youth career
- IF Brommapojkarna

Senior career*
Years	Team	Apps	(Gls)
2015	IF Brommapojkarna	16	(0)
2016–2020	Djurgårdens IF	77	(3)
2021–2024	Rosenborg	13	(0)

International career^{‡}
2015	Sweden U19	1	(0)
2019	Sweden	1	(0)
- * Club domestic league appearances and goals as of 12 September 2022 ‡ National team caps and goals as of 8 January 2019

Hans Oskar Jonathan Augustinsson (born 30 March 1996) is a Swedish professional footballer who currently free agent as a left-back.

== Club career ==
Augustinsson signed for Rosenborg BK in 2021, signing a four-year contract with the club.

== International career ==
He made his debut for the Sweden national team on 8 January 2019 in a friendly against Finland, as a starter.

== Personal life ==
Jonathan is the younger brother of Sevilla's Ludwig Augustinsson, who is currently on loan with R.S.C. Anderlecht that also plays in the same position.

== Career statistics ==
=== Club ===
As of match played 11 September 2022

Appearances and goals by club, season and competition
Club	Season	League			National Cup		Europe		Total	
Club	Season	Division	Apps	Goals	Apps	Goals	Apps	Goals	Apps	Goals
Brommapojkarna	2015	Superettan	16	0	0	0	-		16	0
Brommapojkarna	Total		16	0	0	0	-	-	16	0
Djurgården	2016	Allsvenskan	0	0	2	0	-		2	0
Djurgården	2017	Allsvenskan	8	0	6	1	-		14	1
Djurgården	2018	Allsvenskan	26	1	1	0	2	0	29	1
Djurgården	2019	Allsvenskan	16	0	4	1	-		20	1
Djurgården	2020	Allsvenskan	27	2	1	0	3	0	31	2
Djurgården	Total		77	3	14	2	5	0	96	5
Rosenborg	2021	Eliteserien	10	0	1	0	3	0	14	0
Rosenborg	2022	Eliteserien	3	0	1	0	-		4	0
Rosenborg	Total		13	0	2	0	3	0	18	0
Career total			106	3	16	2	8	0		5

== Honours ==
Djurgårdens IF

- Allsvenskan: 2019
- Svenska Cupen: 2017–18
