= Christopher Brandeborn =

Swedish footballer

Personal information
- Date of birth: 5 March 1991 (age 35)
- Place of birth: Sweden
- Height: 1.74 m (5 ft 9 in)
- Position: Right winger

Youth career
- Västerås SK

Senior career*
Years	Team	Apps	(Gls)
2008–2010	Skiljebo SK	45	(19)
2011–2012	Degerfors IF	52	(11)
2013–2015	Assyriska FF	72	(8)
2016–2019	IF Brommapojkarna	70	(12)
- * Club domestic league appearances and goals as of 27 January 2019

Christopher Brandeborn (born 5 March 1991) is a Swedish footballer who most recently played for IF Brommapojkarna.

== Career ==
=== IF Brommapojkarna ===
Brandeborn left IF Brommapojkarna on 9 January 2019.
