= Medi Dresevic =

Swedish footballer

Personal information
- Full name: Mehmed Dresevic
- Date of birth: 6 June 1992 (age 34)
- Place of birth: Sweden
- Height: 1.83 m (6 ft 0 in)
- Position: Defender

Team information
- Current team: Ljungskile
- Number: 6

Senior career*
Years	Team	Apps	(Gls)
2009–2012	Norrby IF	58	(1)
2013–2014	Dalstorps IF	36	(7)
2015	Kristianstads FF	13	(0)
2016–2019	Norrby IF	70	(4)
2019	AFC Eskilstuna	6	(0)
2019	→ Ljungskile (loan)	10	(0)
2020	Utsikten	22	(1)
2021–	Ljungskile	19	(1)
- * Club domestic league appearances and goals as of 20 November 2021

Mehmed Dresevic (born 6 June 1992) is a Swedish footballer who plays for Ljungskile.
