= Dženis Kozica =

Swedish footballer

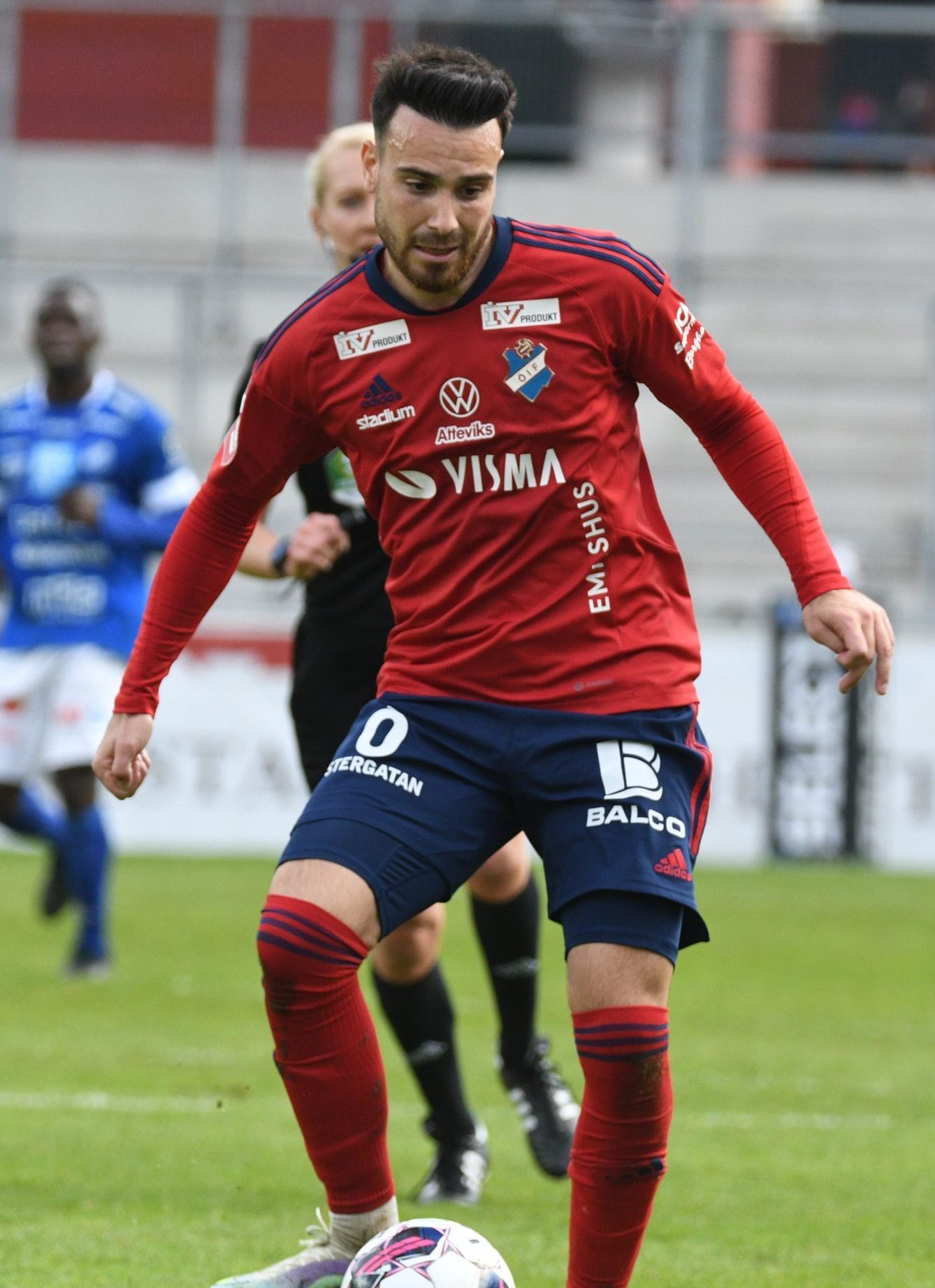
- Kozica with Östers IF in 2022

Personal information
- Date of birth: 28 April 1993 (age 33)
- Place of birth: Trollhättan, Sweden
- Height: 1.80 m (5 ft 11 in)
- Position: Midfielder

Team information
- Current team: Jönköpings Södra
- Number: 10

Youth career
- 2008: IFK Värnamo

Senior career*
Years	Team	Apps	(Gls)
2009–2015	IFK Värnamo	151	(39)
2015–2017	Jönköpings Södra IF	60	(10)
2018–2021	Djurgårdens IF	36	(3)
2019	→ AFC Eskilstuna (loan)	15	(1)
2020	→ Jönköpings Södra IF (loan)	26	(9)
2021	Trelleborgs FF	29	(4)
2022–2023	Östers IF	54	(5)
2024–	Jönköpings Södra IF	88	(10)

International career
2010–2012	Sweden U19	10	(1)
- * Club domestic league appearances and goals as of 16 November 2026

Dženis Kozica (born 28 April 1993) is a Swedish footballer who plays for Jönköpings Södra IF.

== Club career ==
On 10 May 2018 he played as Djurgården beat Malmö FF 3–0 in the Swedish Cup Final.

On 20 January 2022, Kozica signed with Öster.

On 23 February 2024, he signed for three years, back to Jönköpings Södra IF.

== Honours ==
=== Club ===
Djurgårdens IF

- Allsvenskan: 2019
- Svenska Cupen: 2017–18
