= Kalpi Ouattara =

Ivorian footballer

Personal information
- Full name: Kalpi Wilfried Ouattara
- Date of birth: 29 December 1998 (age 27)
- Place of birth: Ivory Coast
- Height: 1.73 m (5 ft 8 in)
- Position: Left-back

Team information
- Current team: Mâcon

Youth career
- –2018: ASEC Mimosas

Senior career*
Years	Team	Apps	(Gls)
2018–2019	ASEC Mimosas		
2019	→ Östersund (loan)	7	(0)
2020–2023	Östersund	28	(0)
2024–	Mâcon	7	(0)

International career^{‡}
2020–	Ivory Coast	2	(0)
- * Club domestic league appearances and goals as of 2 November 2024 ‡ National team caps and goals as of 17 November 2020

Kalpi Ouattara (born 29 December 1998) is an Ivorian professional footballer who plays as a left-back for French Championnat National 3 club Mâcon.

== Career ==
On 20 August 2019, Ouattara joined Allsvenskan side Östersund on loan for the rest of the season from ASEC Mimosas. On 30 August 2019, he made his professional debut for Östersund, playing the full match in a 2–0 loss away to Helsingborg. On 31 December 2019, the Swedish club confirmed, that they had fully signed Outtara from ASEC Mimosas. Ouattara extended his contract with Östersund on 2 January 2023.

== International career ==
Ouattara debuted for the Ivory Coast national team in a 2–1 2021 Africa Cup of Nations qualification win over Madagascar on 12 November 2020.
