= Oscar Jonsson (footballer) =

Swedish footballer

Personal information
- Date of birth: 24 January 1997 (age 29)
- Place of birth: Vemdalen, Sweden
- Height: 1.86 m (6 ft 1 in)
- Position: Goalkeeper

Team information
- Current team: Gefle
- Number: 1

Youth career
- –2013: Svegs IK
- 2013–2014: IK Brage
- 2014–2016: Djurgårdens IF

Senior career*
Years	Team	Apps	(Gls)
2016–2018	Djurgårdens IF	1	(0)
2016	→ Håbo FF (loan)	5	(0)
2017	→ Enskede IK (loan)	6	(0)
2018	→ IK Frej (loan)	0	(0)
2019	Karlstad BK	29	(0)
2020	IF Karlstad	29	(0)
2021–2023	GIF Sundsvall	38	(0)
2024–	Gefle	8	(0)

International career
2014	Sweden U17	3	(0)
2016	Sweden U19	1	(0)
- * Club domestic league appearances and goals as of 15 November 2024

Oscar Jonsson (born 24 January 1997) is a Swedish footballer who plays for Gefle as a goalkeeper.

== Career ==
In 2016 Jonsson was loaned out to Swedish fourth-tier team Håbo FF. In 2017, he went on a loan to third-tier team Enskede IK.

On 22 January 2019, Jonsson signed a two-year contract with Karlstad BK.

On 18 January 2021, Jonsson joined GIF Sundsvall on a three-year deal.

On 22 December 2023, Jonsson signed with Gefle for the 2024 season.

== International career ==
Jonsson has represented the Sweden U17 and Sweden U19.
