= Thomas Lagerlöf =

Swedish footballer and coach

Personal information
- Full name: Thomas Olof Lagerlöf
- Date of birth: 15 November 1971 (age 54)
- Place of birth: Österåker, Stockholm, Sweden
- Height: 1.82 m (5 ft 11 1/2 in)
- Position: Midfielder

Team information
- Current team: Djurgårdens IF (manager)

Youth career
- 1978–1984: IFK Österåker
- 1985–1989: AIK

Senior career*
Years	Team	Apps	(Gls)
1990–2001	AIK	208	(15)
2002–2004	FK Lyn	43	(6)
2004–2007	Brommapojkarna	57	(8)
Total		298	(29)

International career
1993	Sweden U21	1	(0)

Managerial career
- 2007-2008: AIK (assistant coach)
- 2008–2011: Väsby United
- 2012–2018: IK Sirius
- 2018–2024: Djurgårdens IF
- * Club domestic league appearances and goals

Thomas Olof "Tolle" Lagerlöf (born 15 November 1971) is a Swedish football coach. A former player for Stockholm rivals AIK, he has been coach of the Allsvenskan team Djurgårdens IF since 2018 to 2024, leading them to the title in 2019.

== Honours ==
=== Player ===
AIK

- Swedish Champion: 1992, 1998

=== Manager ===
Djurgårdens IF

- Allsvenskan: 2019
