= Omar Eddahri =

Swedish footballer

Personal information
- Full name: Omar Eddahri
- Date of birth: 30 August 1990 (age 36)
- Place of birth: Stockholm, Sweden
- Height: 1.85 m (6 ft 1 in)
- Positions: Attacking midfielder; winger; striker

Youth career
- Sundbybergs IK
- Rissne IF
- Vasalunds IF
- –2008: Djurgårdens IF

Senior career*
Years	Team	Apps	(Gls)
2008	Täby IS	15	(6)
2009	Väsby United	15	(0)
2009	Sollentuna United	10	(9)
2010	Väsby United	1	(0)
2010	Akropolis IF	5	(1)
2011	Sollentuna United		
2012	Kungsängens IF		
2012	Akropolis IF	7	(0)
2013	Sollentuna FK	6	(0)
2014–2017	AFC Eskilstuna	97	(30)
2018	IK Sirius	6	(0)
2018	Ittihad Tanger	0	(0)
2018	Djurgårdens IF	6	(0)
2019	GIF Sundsvall	13	(3)
- * Club domestic league appearances and goals as of 19:26, 27 May 2019 (UTC)

Omar Eddahri (born 30 August 1990) is a Swedish footballer. He can play as a winger, attacking midfielder or striker.

Eddahri is known for his dribbling ability, taking on players with his speed. Eddahri started his career with Sundbybergs IK, Rissne IF, Vasalunds IF and Djurgårdens IF in their youth system, before joining Täby IS, Väsby United, Akropolis IF, Sollentuna United, Sollentuna FK between 2008 and 2014.

From 2014 to 2018 he played for AFC Eskilstuna formally known as AFC United, there he achieved promotions as Champions to the Superettan in 2014 and second-place in 2016 to the top-tier of the Swedish Allsvenskan league. After four years there, he joined Allsvenskan side IK Sirius for six games.

== Club career ==
Eddahri was born in Rissne, Stockholm, Sweden; he started his career playing as a junior for Sundbybergs IK, Rissne IF, Vasalunds IF and Djurgårdens IF. Eddahri played for Täby IS, Väsby United, Akropolis IF, Sollentuna United, Sollentuna FK between 2008 and 2014. While playing for Sollentuna United in September 2011, he went to Spain for one week for a trial with La Liga side Sevilla.

=== AFC United / AFC Eskilstuna ===
Eddahri signed for AFC United in April 2014. He made his debut in a 2–1 defeat at IK Brage on 21 April 2014. He earned promotion into the Superettan as Champions with AFC United in October 2014. In February 2016, Eddahri signed a new two-year contract with the club being renamed AFC Eskilstuna. In November 2016, he won promotion again with AFC United in second-place, only losing out as Champions on goal difference. During his four years at AFC United/AFC Eskilstuna, he was their club captain.

Eddahris intentions were to play abroad in the near future, he was reported to be amidst much transfer speculation with clubs in England, Turkey and Sweden reportedly scouting; in June 2017 EFL Championship side Fulham and TFF First League Eskişehirspor amongst other clubs watching the forward. In February 2018, A-League side Melbourne City were interested in signing Eddahri on a short-term deal. Manager Warren Joyce had been in dialogue with Eddahri.

=== IK Sirius ===
On 5 March 2018, Eddahri signed a one-year contract with Allsvenskan side IK Sirius. After playing six matches for IK Sirius, Eddahri left the club by mutual agreement on 30 May 2018.

=== IR Tanger ===
On 12 June, Eddahri signed a three-year contract with Moroccan Botola club Ittihad Tanger. On 25 July, the club announces the termination the contract of the player at his request.

=== Djurgårdens IF ===
On 9 August 2018, Eddahri signed a short-term contract with Djurgårdens IF, a club that he played with as a junior. The contract will run through the end of the 2018 Allsvenskan season.

== Personal life ==
Eddahri was born in Sweden, he's of Moroccan descent and eligible to play for either Sweden, or the Morocco national football team respectively having already had dialogue with Morocco. Eddahri has many relatives that live in France and has visited numerous times.

== Career statistics ==
As of match played on 23 May 2018

Appearances and goals by club, season and competition
Club	Season	League			Cup (Note: Cup competitions include the Svenska Cupen, Moroccan Throne Cup)		League Cup		Other		Total	
Club	Season	Division	Apps	Goals	Apps	Goals	Apps	Goals	Apps	Goals	Apps	Goals
Täby IS	2008	Division 3 (Swedish football)	15	6	0	0	—		0	0	15	6
Väsby United	2009	Superettan	15	0	0	0	—		0	0	15	0
Sollentuna United	2009	Division 2 (Swedish football)	10	9	0	0	—		0	0	10	9
Väsby United	2010	Superettan	1	0	0	0	—		0	0	1	0
Akropolis IF	2010	Division 2 (Swedish football)	5	1	0	0	—		0	0	5	1
Sollentuna United	2011	Division 2 (Swedish football)	0	0	0	0	—		0	0	0	0
Kungsängens IF	2012	Division 4 (Swedish football)	0	0	0	0	—		0	0	0	0
Akropolis IF	2012	Division 1 (Swedish football)	7	0	0	0	—		0	0	7	0
Sollentuna FK	2013	Division 2 (Swedish football)	6	0	0	0	—		0	0	6	0
AFC United	2014	Division 1 (Swedish football)	24	9	4	0	—		0	0	28	9
AFC United	2015	Superettan	26	6	4	1	—		0	0	30	7
AFC United	2016	Superettan	22	5	1	1	—		0	0	23	6
AFC United	Total		72	20	9	2	—		0	0	81	22
AFC Eskilstuna	2017	Allsvenskan	25	8	0	0	—		0	0	25	8
IK Sirius	2018	Allsvenskan	6	0	0	0	—		0	0	6	0
Ittihad Tanger	2018–19	Botola	0	0	0	0	—		0	0	0	0
Career total			162	44	9	2	—		0	0	171	46

== Honours ==
=== Club ===
AFC United

- Division 1 Norra Champions: 2014
- Superettan second-place promotion: 2016
