= Marcus Danielson =

Swedish footballer

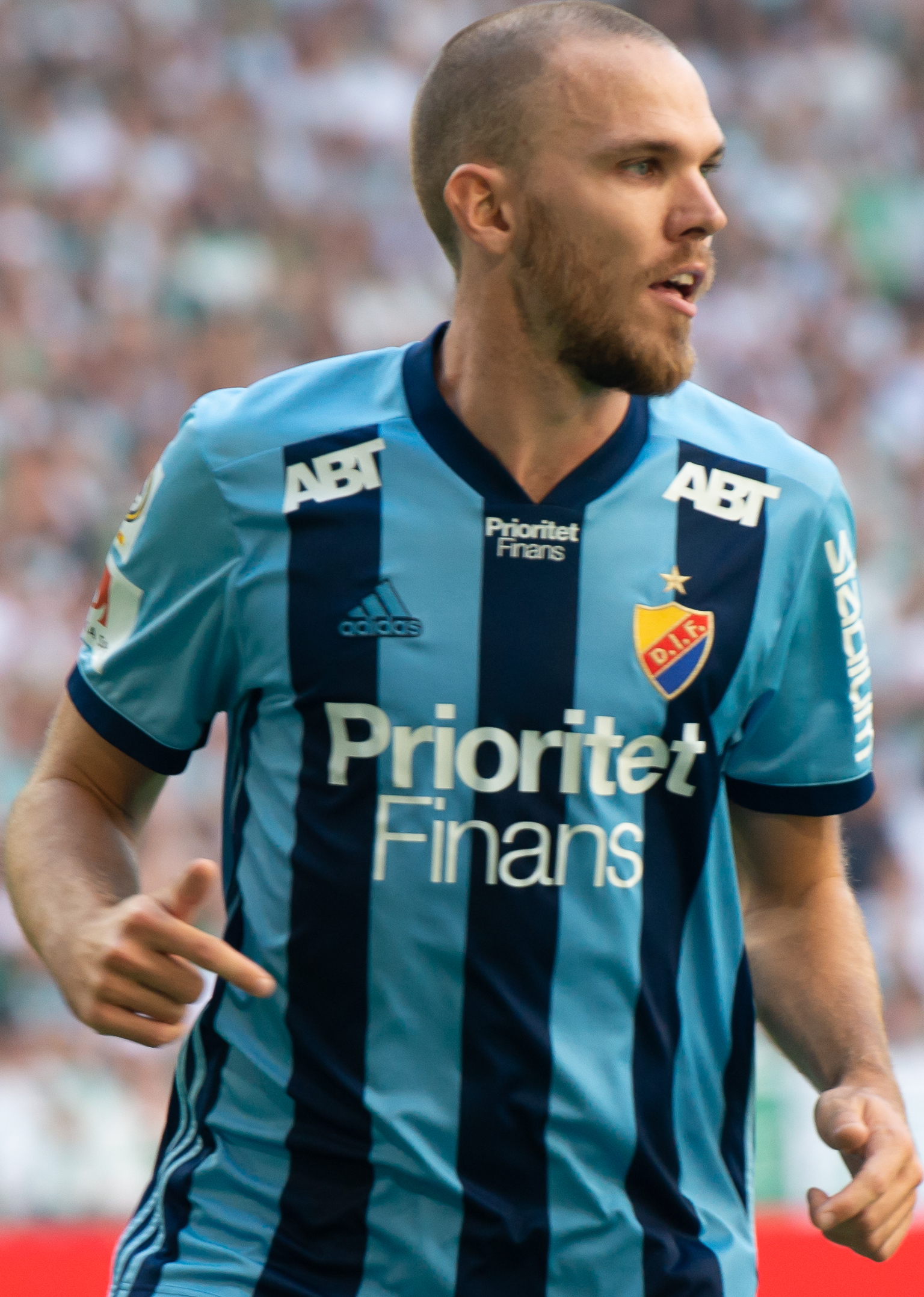
- Danielson playing for Djurgårdens IF in 2018

Personal information
- Full name: Marcus Andreas Danielson
- Date of birth: 8 April 1989 (age 37)
- Place of birth: Eskilstuna, Sweden
- Height: 1.92 m (6 ft 4 in)
- Position: Defender

Team information
- Current team: Siena
- Number: 13

Youth career
- Skogstorps IF

Senior career*
Years	Team	Apps	(Gls)
2005	Skogstorps GoIF		
2006–2007	IFK Eskilstuna	32	(4)
2007–2009	Helsingborgs IF	0	(0)
2009–2011	Västerås SK	67	(15)
2012–2017	GIF Sundsvall	151	(10)
2018–2020	Djurgårdens IF	52	(6)
2020–2022	Dalian Professional	21	(3)
2022–2025	Djurgårdens IF	95	(9)
2026–	Siena	0	(0)

International career
2006	Sweden U17	2	(0)
2007	Sweden U19	3	(0)
2019–2022	Sweden	19	(3)
- * Club domestic league appearances and goals as of 19:39, 19 September 2026 (UTC)

Marcus Andreas Danielson (born 8 April 1989) is a Swedish professional footballer who plays as a defender for Serie D club Siena. A full international between 2019 and 2022, he won 19 caps for the Sweden national team and represented his country at UEFA Euro 2020.

== Club career ==
=== Early career ===
Danielson played for the fourth tier football club IFK Eskilstuna until he successfully trialed for top tier club Helsingborgs IF in the summer of 2007. At Helsingborgs IF he struggled to break into the first team and the club allowed him a free transfer to third tier club Västerås SK on 27 July 2009.

=== Västerås SK ===
Danielson gained considerably more playing time at Västerås SK and by the 2010 league season he was integral part of the team that won the division title and promotion into the Superettan. The club struggled in the second tier and at the end of the 2011 league season they were relegated. While at Västerås, Danielson played center back alongside his future Sweden international teammate Victor Nilsson Lindelöf.

=== GIF Sundsvall ===
On 8 February 2012, Danielson transferred to newly promoted top tier club GIF Sundsvall for the start of the 2012 Allsvenskan. He made his league debut on 31 March 2012 in a 1–0 defeat to Kalmar FF. The club were relegated at the end of the season after losing a relegation play-off to Halmstads BK. Danielson remained at the club, which finished runners-up in the 2014 Superettan and were promoted back into Allsvenskan.

=== Djurgårdens IF ===
On 12 February 2018, Danielson signed for top tier club Djurgårdens IF. He made his league debut in the first game of the campaign on 1 April 2018 against Östersunds FK, scoring the only goal of the game.

On 10 May 2018, Danielson played as Djurgården beat Malmö FF 3–0 in the Swedish Cup Final.

He played in 27 games and was selected as the league's Most Valuable Player when Djurgården won the 2019 Allsvenskan.

=== Dalian Professional ===
On 28 February 2020 Danielson became Djurgården's most expensive outbound transfer ever, when he was sold to the Chinese club Dalian Professional for more than 50 million SEK.

He made his debut for Dalian on 26 July 2020, scoring a goal in a 2–3 loss to Shandong Luneng. In his second game for the club, he picked up a red card when conceding a penalty in a 1–1 draw against Henan Jianye.

== International career ==
=== Youth ===
Danielson represented the Sweden U17 and U19 teams a total of 5 times between 2006 and 2007.

=== Senior ===
On 7 October 2019, Danielson was called up by to the Sweden national team squad for the UEFA Euro 2020 qualifying games against Malta and Spain as a replacement for the injured central defender Pontus Jansson. He scored from a corner ten minutes into his debut, in what ended up as a 4–0 victory for Sweden over Malta. On 14 November 2020, he scored his second international goal in a 2–1 win against Croatia in the 2020–21 UEFA Nations League A, though he also scored an own goal against the same opponent, which contributed to Sweden's eventual relegation. He scored his third international goal in a friendly with Armenia on 5 June 2021.

==== UEFA Euro 2020 ====
He was named in Sweden's UEFA Euro 2020 squad in May 2021, and started in all three group stage games alongside Victor Lindelöf as a centre back. On 29 June 2021, Danielson was sent off in the Round of 16 game against Ukraine following a foul on Artem Besyedin as Sweden was eliminated in extra-time.

==== 2022 FIFA World Cup qualifying and retirement ====
Danielson played in five 2022 FIFA World Cup qualifying games as Sweden failed to qualify for the 2022 FIFA World Cup after losing to Poland in the UEFA second round Path A final on 29 March 2022.

On 12 May 2022, Danielson announced his retirement from the national team. He won a total of 19 caps and scored 3 goals for Sweden.

== Career statistics ==
=== Club ===
As of match played 9 November 2025.

Appearances and goals by club, season and competition
Club	Season	League			National Cup		Continental		Other		Total	
Club	Season	Division	Apps	Goals	Apps	Goals	Apps	Goals	Apps	Goals	Apps	Goals
IFK Eskilstuna	2006	Division 2 Östra Svealand			—		—		—			
IFK Eskilstuna	2007	Division 2 Östra Svealand			—		—		—			
IFK Eskilstuna	Total		32	4	0	0	—		—		32	4
Helsingborgs IF	2008	Allsvenskan	0	0	0	0	—		—		0	0
Västerås SK	2009	Division 1 Norra	12	2	0	0	—		—		12	2
Västerås SK	2010	Division 1 Norra	25	5	0	0	—		—		25	5
Västerås SK	2011	Superettan	30	8	0	0	—		—		30	8
Västerås SK	Total		67	15	0	0	—		—		67	15
GIF Sundsvall	2012	Allsvenskan	29	1	2	0	—		2 (Note: Appearances in Allsvenskan relegation play-offs)	0	33	1
GIF Sundsvall	2013	Superettan	29	3	4	0	—		2	0	35	4
GIF Sundsvall	2014	Superettan	28	1	0	0	—		—		28	1
GIF Sundsvall	2015	Allsvenskan	8	0	0	0	—		—		8	0
GIF Sundsvall	2016	Allsvenskan	30	0	4	0	—		—		34	0
GIF Sundsvall	2017	Allsvenskan	27	5	1	0	—		—		28	5
GIF Sundsvall	2018	Allsvenskan	0	0	1	0	—		—		1	0
GIF Sundsvall	Total		151	10	12	0	—		4	0	167	10
Djurgårdens IF	2018	Allsvenskan	25	2	2	0	—		—		27	2
Djurgårdens IF	2019	Allsvenskan	27	4	0	0	2	0	—		29	4
Djurgårdens IF	Total		52	6	2	0	2	0	—		56	6
Dalian Professional	2020	Chinese Super League	16	1	0	0	—		—		16	1
Dalian Professional	2021	Chinese Super League	10	2	0	0	—		2 (Note: Appearance(s) in CSL Relegation play-offs)	0	12	2
Dalian Professional	Total		26	3	0	0	—		2	0	28	3
Djurgårdens IF	2022	Allsvenskan	13	1	1	0	10	1	—		24	2
Djurgårdens IF	2023	Allsvenskan	29	5	6	1	3	0	—		48	6
Djurgårdens IF	2024	Allsvenskan	23	2	7	1	11	0	—		31	3
Djurgårdens IF	2025	Allsvenskan	30	1	0	0	5	1	—		35	2
Djurgårdens IF	Total		95	9	14	2	29	2	—		138	13
Career total			423	47	28	2	31	2	6	0	488	51

=== International ===
Appearances and goals by national team and year
National team	Year	Apps	Goals
Sweden	2019	2	1
Sweden	2020	5	1
Sweden	2021	10	1
Sweden	2022	2	0
Total		19	3

International goals

Scores and results list Sweden's goal tally first.

No.	Date	Venue	Opponent	Score	Result	Competition	Ref.
1.	12 October 2019	National Stadium, Ta' Qali, Malta	Malta	1–0	4–0	UEFA Euro 2020 qualifying	
2.	14 November 2020	Friends Arena, Solna, Sweden	Croatia	2–0	2–1	2020–21 UEFA Nations League A	
3.	5 June 2021	Friends Arena, Solna, Sweden	Armenia	2–0	3–1	Friendly	

== Honours ==
Västerås SK

- Division 1 Norra: 2010

Djurgårdens IF

- Allsvenskan: 2019
- Svenska Cupen: 2017–18

Individual

- Allsvenskan Most valuable player: 2019
- Allsvenskan Defender of the year: 2019
- Allsvenskan Player of the Month: July 2019
