= 2019 Allsvenskan =

95th season of Allsvenskan

Allsvenskan
- Season: 2019
- Champions: Djurgårdens IF; 8th Allsvenskan title 12th Swedish championship title
- Relegated: GIF Sundsvall; AFC Eskilstuna
- Champions League: Djurgårdens IF
- Europa League: Malmö FF; Hammarby IF; Göteborg (via Svenska Cupen)
- Top goalscorer: Mohamed Buya Turay (15 goals)
- Biggest home win: IFK Göteborg 7–1 Östersunds FK (2 November 2019)
- Biggest away win: AFC Eskilstuna 1–6 Hammarby IF (27 July 2019); Örebro SK 0–5 Malmö FF (2 November 2019)
- Highest scoring: Hammarby IF 6–2 Falkenbergs FF (7 July 2019); Hammarby IF 6–2 IFK Göteborg (15 September 2019); IFK Göteborg 7–1 Östersunds FK (2 November 2019)
- Longest winning run: 8 matches Hammarby IF
- Longest unbeaten run: 18 matches Malmö FF
- Longest winless run: 18 matches GIF Sundsvall
- Longest losing run: 7 matches Östersunds FK
- Highest attendance: 45,367; AIK 1–0 Djurgårdens IF (1 September 2019)
- Lowest attendance: 1,876; AFC Eskilstuna 4–1 BK Häcken (25 August 2019)
- Average attendance: 9,166

The 2019 Allsvenskan, part of the 2019 Swedish football season, was the 95th season of Allsvenskan since its establishment in 1924. A total of 16 teams participated. AIK were the defending champions after winning the title in the previous season.

Djurgårdens IF won the Allsvenskan title, their first since 2005, their 8th overall and their 12th Swedish championship overall, in the 30th and final round on 2 November 2019 by playing a 2–2 tie in their away fixture against IFK Norrköping. This was also the second consecutive year that a team from Stockholm clinched the title.

== Teams ==
Location of teams in 2019 Allsvenskan

A total of sixteen teams are contesting the league, including thirteen sides from the previous season, two promoted teams from the 2018 Superettan and one team from the 2018 Allsvenskan play-offs.

Dalkurd FF and Trelleborgs FF were relegated at the end of the 2018 season after finishing in the bottom two places of the table, and were replaced by the 2018 Superettan champions Helsingborgs IF and runners-up Falkenbergs FF. Helsingborg make their return to Allsvenskan after a two-year absence, this will be their 67th season in the top flight. Falkenberg will take part in Allsvenskan for the fourth time, returning to Allsvenskan after a two-year absence.

The play-off spot was taken by AFC Eskilstuna, replacing IF Brommapojkarna. The team made it back to Allsvenskan after just one season in the second division, having been relegated in 2017.

=== Stadia and locations ===
Team	Location	Stadium	Turf^{1}	Stadium capacity^{1}
AFC Eskilstuna	Eskilstuna	Tunavallen	Artificial	7,500
AIK	Stockholm	Friends Arena	Natural	50,000
BK Häcken	Gothenburg	Bravida Arena	Artificial	6,500
Djurgårdens IF	Stockholm	Tele2 Arena	Artificial	30,000
Falkenbergs FF	Falkenberg	Falcon Alkoholfri Arena	Natural	5,565
GIF Sundsvall	Sundsvall	NP3 Arena	Artificial	7,700
Hammarby IF	Stockholm	Tele2 Arena	Artificial	30,000
Helsingborgs IF	Helsingborg	Olympia	Natural	16,500
IF Elfsborg	Borås	Borås Arena	Artificial	16,899
IFK Göteborg	Gothenburg	Gamla Ullevi	Natural	18,600
IFK Norrköping	Norrköping	Nya Parken	Artificial	15,734
IK Sirius	Uppsala	Studenternas IP	Artificial	6,300
Kalmar FF	Kalmar	Guldfågeln Arena	Natural	12,000
Malmö FF	Malmö	Eleda Stadion	Natural	22,500
Örebro SK	Örebro	Behrn Arena	Artificial	12,300
Östersunds FK	Östersund	Jämtkraft Arena	Artificial	8,466

- ^{1} According to each club information page at the Swedish Football Association website for Allsvenskan.

=== Managerial changes ===
Team	Outgoing manager	Manner of departure	Date of vacancy	Table	Incoming manager	Date of appointment
Djurgårdens IF	(Sweden) Özcan Melkemichel	End of contract	November 15, 2018	Pre-season	(Sweden) Kim Bergstrand (Sweden) Thomas Lagerlöf	November 16, 2018
IK Sirius	(Sweden) Kim Bergstrand (Sweden) Thomas Lagerlöf	Resigned	November 15, 2018	Pre-season	(Sweden) Henrik Rydström	December 10, 2018
Kalmar FF	(Sweden) Henrik Rydström	End of contract	November 18, 2018	Pre-season	(Sweden) Magnus Pehrsson	November 27, 2018
Helsingborgs IF	(Sweden) Per-Ola Ljung	Sacked	June 15, 2019	14th	(Sweden) Henrik Larsson	June 16, 2019
Helsingborgs IF	(Sweden) Henrik Larsson	Resigned	August 23, 2019	12th	(Sweden) Olof Mellberg	September 3, 2019
GIF Sundsvall	(Sweden) Joel Cedergren	Sacked	August 30, 2019	16th	(Sweden) Tony Gustavsson	September 2, 2019
AFC Eskilstuna	(Sweden) Nemanja Miljanović	Promoted to Director of Football Operations	September 5, 2019	15th	(Lithuania) Saulius Širmelis (Lithuania) Saulius Cekanavicius	September 5, 2019
Kalmar FF	(Sweden) Magnus Pehrsson	Sacked	October 31, 2019	13th	(Sweden) Jens Nilsson	October 31, 2019

== League table ==
Pos	Team	Pld	W	D	L	GF	GA	GD	Pts	Qualification or relegation
1	Djurgårdens IF (C)	30	20	6	4	53	19	+34	66	Qualification for the Champions League first qualifying round
2	Malmö FF	30	19	8	3	56	16	+40	65	Qualification for the Europa League first qualifying round
3	Hammarby IF	30	20	5	5	75	38	+37	65	Qualification for the Europa League first qualifying round
4	AIK	30	19	5	6	47	24	+23	62	
5	IFK Norrköping	30	16	9	5	54	26	+28	57	
6	BK Häcken	30	14	7	9	44	29	+15	49	
7	IFK Göteborg	30	13	9	8	46	31	+15	48	Qualification for the Europa League second qualifying round (Note: IFK Göteborg qualified for the Europa League second qualifying round by winning the 2019–20 Svenska Cupen.)
8	IF Elfsborg	30	11	10	9	44	45	−1	43	
9	Örebro SK	30	9	6	15	40	56	−16	33	
10	Helsingborgs IF	30	8	6	16	29	49	−20	30	
11	IK Sirius	30	8	5	17	34	51	−17	29	
12	Östersunds FK	30	5	10	15	27	52	−25	25	
13	Falkenbergs FF	30	6	7	17	25	62	−37	25	
14	Kalmar FF (O)	30	4	11	15	22	47	−25	23	Qualification for the relegation play-offs
15	GIF Sundsvall (R)	30	4	8	18	31	50	−19	20	Relegation to the Superettan
16	AFC Eskilstuna (R)	30	4	8	18	23	55	−32	20	Relegation to the Superettan

Source: svenskfotboll.se (in Swedish)
Rules for classification: 1) Points; 2) Goal difference; 3) Goals scored; 4) Head-to-head points; 5) Head-to-head goal difference; 6) Head-to-head away goals scored; 7) Play-off
(Note: Play-off is only played if need to decide champion, teams for relegation or UEFA competition and will be played on a neutral ground).
(C) Champions; (O) Play-off winners; (R) Relegated

== Positions by round ==
Team ╲ Round	1	2	3	4	5	6	7	8	9	10	11	12	13	14	15	16	17	18	19	20	21	22	23	24	25	26	27	28	29	30
Djurgårdens IF	6	2	1	1	1	1	4	7	6	5	3	2	2	2	3	3	2	1	1	1	1	1	1	1	1	1	2	1	1	1
Malmö FF	10	12	8	3	2	2	1	1	1	1	1	1	1	1	1	2	3	2	3	2	4	3	3	2	2	2	1	3	2	2
Hammarby IF	8	10	13	7	13	8	7	4	4	6	6	6	6	6	6	6	4	5	4	4	3	5	4	4	4	3	3	2	3	3
AIK	11	11	5	8	4	9	8	5	5	3	4	3	3	3	2	1	1	3	2	3	2	2	2	3	3	4	4	4	4	4
IFK Norrköping	15	13	15	9	10	10	10	11	9	8	8	7	7	7	7	7	7	7	7	7	7	7	7	7	5	5	5	5	5	5
BK Häcken	7	4	2	2	7	6	3	3	3	2	5	5	4	5	4	4	6	4	5	5	5	4	5	5	6	6	6	6	6	6
IFK Göteborg	14	8	11	4	6	5	2	2	2	4	2	4	5	4	5	5	5	6	6	6	6	6	6	6	7	7	7	7	7	7
IF Elfsborg	9	15	9	10	3	3	5	8	7	7	7	8	8	8	9	10	8	9	10	8	8	9	9	9	9	8	8	8	8	8
Örebro SK	13	16	16	15	16	14	14	13	13	11	12	9	11	12	12	11	9	8	8	9	9	8	8	8	8	9	9	9	9	9
Helsingborgs IF	2	7	3	6	9	13	12	12	14	13	13	14	13	11	11	12	12	12	11	12	13	10	13	10	10	10	10	10	10	10
IK Sirius	3	1	4	5	8	11	13	14	11	12	9	12	9	9	10	9	11	11	12	13	12	12	10	11	11	11	11	12	11	11
Östersunds FK	12	5	10	12	5	4	6	6	8	9	10	10	10	10	8	8	10	10	9	10	10	11	11	13	13	13	13	11	12	12
Falkenbergs FF	4	9	12	16	15	16	16	16	16	16	16	15	15	15	16	16	13	13	13	14	14	14	14	14	14	15	15	16	14	13
Kalmar FF	16	14	14	11	11	12	11	9	10	10	11	11	12	13	13	13	14	14	14	11	11	13	12	12	12	12	12	13	13	14
GIF Sundsvall	5	3	7	14	12	7	9	10	12	14	14	13	14	14	14	14	15	16	16	16	16	16	16	16	15	14	14	14	15	15
AFC Eskilstuna	1	6	6	13	14	15	15	15	15	15	15	16	16	16	15	15	16	15	15	15	15	15	15	15	16	16	16	15	16	16

Leader
2019–20 UEFA Europa League First qualifying round
Relegation play-offs
Relegation to 2020 Superettan

Source: everysport.com

== Results ==
Home \ Away	AFC	AIK	BKH	DIF	FFF	GIFS	HAM	HIF	IFE	IFKG	IFKN	IKS	KFF	MFF	ÖSK	ÖFK
AFC Eskilstuna	—	2–4	0–2	1–1	0–0	1–0	1–6	1–1	2–2	3–1	0–2	0–0	3–1	0–1	1–1	0–1
AIK	2–1	—	1–0	1–0	2–0	2–1	2–0	2–0	3–0	1–0	0–2	2–1	1–2	0–0	2–0	0–0
BK Häcken	3–0	1–2	—	0–1	4–1	1–0	2–0	2–1	1–2	1–2	0–1	4–1	1–0	1–1	3–0	1–1
Djurgårdens IF	3–0	0–2	2–0	—	1–0	2–2	1–2	2–0	2–0	2–1	1–1	4–0	2–0	1–1	3–0	3–1
Falkenbergs FF	1–0	1–5	0–3	0–3	—	2–0	0–2	1–1	2–1	1–1	0–2	0–0	0–0	1–2	1–0	1–0
GIF Sundsvall	0–0	1–1	0–1	1–4	3–1	—	2–3	1–2	1–2	0–2	4–4	2–1	1–2	3–1	1–2	1–1
Hammarby	3–1	2–1	4–1	2–1	6–2	3–0	—	2–1	5–2	6–2	2–2	2–0	1–1	2–0	5–1	4–0
Helsingborgs IF	2–1	1–3	0–2	1–1	1–1	1–1	2–1	—	1–2	1–2	3–1	1–0	2–0	0–1	1–4	2–0
IF Elfsborg	1–0	1–1	0–0	0–1	4–0	3–1	1–1	1–1	—	2–0	0–0	1–1	2–1	0–3	4–2	4–1
IFK Göteborg	1–0	3–0	0–0	0–1	1–1	2–1	0–0	3–1	3–0	—	0–0	2–1	4–0	0–0	0–1	7–1
IFK Norrköping	4–0	0–0	2–1	2–2	4–3	2–0	2–0	5–0	2–0	1–2	—	0–1	1–0	1–1	3–0	3–0
IK Sirius	3–2	0–2	3–4	0–2	2–0	1–0	1–3	2–1	2–4	2–4	0–2	—	3–0	0–1	3–4	1–1
Kalmar FF	0–0	0–1	1–1	0–1	2–3	0–2	2–2	1–0	1–1	1–1	2–2	0–2	—	0–5	1–1	1–1
Malmö FF	5–0	2–0	1–1	0–1	5–0	2–1	4–1	3–0	4–1	1–0	1–0	1–1	1–0	—	2–1	2–0
Örebro SK	3–1	2–1	1–2	0–3	4–0	0–0	2–3	0–1	2–2	2–2	1–2	0–2	1–1	0–5	—	2–0
Östersunds FK	1–2	1–3	1–1	1–2	3–2	1–1	1–2	3–0	1–1	0–0	2–1	2–0	1–2	0–0	1–3	—

Source: Swedish Football Association (in Swedish)
Legend: Blue = home team win; Yellow = draw; Red = away team win.
For upcoming matches, an "a" indicates there is an article about the rivalry between the two participants.

== Relegation play-offs ==
The 14th-placed team of Allsvenskan met the third-placed team from 2019 Superettan in a two-legged tie on a home-and-away basis with the team from Allsvenskan finishing at home.

6 November 2019
19:00 CET

IK Brage	0–2	Kalmar FF
	Report	Herrem 24'; Fröling 61'

Domnarvsvallen, Borlänge
Attendance: 3,554
Referee: Martin Strömbergsson

10 November 2019
14:45 CET

Kalmar FF	2–2	IK Brage
Aliti 61'; Hallberg 86'	Report	Morsay 88'; Kouakou 90+2'

Guldfågeln Arena, Kalmar
Attendance: 6,218
Referee: Mohammed Al-Hakim

Kalmar FF won 4–2 on aggregate.

== Season statistics ==
=== Top scorers ===
As of 2 November 2019

Rank	Player	Club	Goals
1	(Sierra Leone) Mohamed Buya Turay	Djurgårdens IF	15
2	(Sweden) Robin Söder	IFK Göteborg	14
2	(Sweden) Muamer Tanković	Hammarby IF	14
4	(Serbia) Nikola Đurđić	Hammarby IF	13
4	(Sweden) Markus Rosenberg	Malmö FF	13
6	(Norway) Tarik Elyounoussi	AIK	11
6	(Eritrea) Henok Goitom	AIK	11
6	(Sweden) Jordan Larsson	IFK Norrköping	11
6	(Brazil) Paulinho	BK Häcken	11
6	(Sweden) Carlos Strandberg	Örebro SK	11

=== Hat-tricks ===
Player	For	Against	Result	Date
(Sweden) Alexander Kačaniklić	Hammarby IF	Falkenbergs FF	6–2	7 July 2019
(Sweden) Filip Rogić	Örebro SK	Falkenbergs FF	4–0	20 July 2019
(Serbia) Nikola Đurđić	Hammarby IF	AFC Eskilstuna	1–6	27 July 2019
(Sweden) Carlos Strandberg	Örebro SK	Helsingborgs IF	1–4	29 July 2019
(Sweden) Carlos Strandberg	Örebro SK	IK Sirius	3–4	24 August 2019
(Sweden) Robin Söder	IFK Göteborg	Kalmar FF	4–0	26 August 2019
(Montenegro) Vladimir Rodić	Hammarby IF	Örebro SK	5–1	30 September 2019
(Eritrea) Henok Goitom^{4 goals}	AIK	Falkenbergs FF	1–5	20 October 2019

=== Monthly awards ===
Month	Allsvenskan Player of the Month	
Month	Player	Club
April	(Sweden) Linus Hallenius	GIF Sundsvall
May	(Norway) Tarik Elyounoussi	AIK
July	(Sweden) Marcus Danielson	Djurgårdens IF
August	(Sweden) Muamer Tanković	Hammarby IF
September	(Montenegro) Sead Hakšabanović	IFK Norrköping
October	(Sweden) Darijan Bojanić	Hammarby IF

=== Annual awards ===
Award	Winner	Club
Player of the Year	(Sweden) Marcus Danielson	Djurgårdens IF
Goalkeeper of the Year	(Sweden) Isak Pettersson	IFK Norrköping
Defender of the Year	(Sweden) Marcus Danielson	Djurgårdens IF
Midfielder of the Year	(Denmark) Anders Christiansen	Malmö FF
Striker of the Year	(Serbia) Nikola Djurdjic	Hammarby IF
Breakthrough of the Year	(Nigeria) Alhassan Yusuf	IFK Göteborg
Coach of the Year	(Sweden) Kim Bergstrand	Djurgårdens IF

== Attendances ==
#	Club	Average	Highest
1	Hammarby IF	24,232	31,337
2	AIK	18,970	45,367
3	Malmö FF	16,566	21,812
4	Djurgårdens IF	15,958	28,258
5	IFK Göteborg	12,837	17,222
6	IFK Norrköping	8,476	15,150
7	Helsingborgs IF	8,345	16,127
8	IF Elfsborg	5,823	10,167
9	Örebro SK	5,784	11,221
10	Kalmar FF	5,307	9,116
11	Östersunds FK	4,809	6,395
12	GIF Sundsvall	4,620	6,020
13	IK Sirius FK	4,288	6,132
14	Falkenbergs FF	3,733	6,214
15	BK Häcken	3,632	6,316
16	AFC Eskilstuna	3,276	7,037

== See also ==
Competitions

- 2019 Superettan
- 2019 Division 1
- 2018–19 Svenska Cupen
- 2019–20 Svenska Cupen

Team seasons

- 2019 AIK Fotboll season
- 2019 BK Häcken season
- 2019 Djurgårdens IF season
- 2019 Hammarby Fotboll season
- 2019 Malmö FF season
