= 2016 Djurgårdens IF season =

Djurgårdens IF Fotboll
2016 season
- Chairman: Lars-Erik Sjöberg
- Manager: Pelle Olsson (sacked); Mark Dempsey
- Stadium: Tele2 Arena
- Allsvenskan: 7th
- Svenska Cupen: Group stage
- Top goalscorer: League: Michael Olunga (12); All: Michael Olunga (12)
- Highest home attendance: 24,900 (19 April vs Hammarby IF, Allsvenskan)
- Lowest home attendance: 6,409 (22 February vs Ljungskile SK, Svenska Cupen)
- Average home league attendance: 13,025 (Allsvenskan)
Home colours	Away colours	Third colours

The 2016 season was Djurgårdens IF's 116th in existence, their 61st season in Allsvenskan and their 16th consecutive season in the league. They finished the season in 7th position, while being knocked out of the 2015–16 Svenska Cupen at the group stage, and progressing to the group stage of the 2016–17 Svenska Cupen.

== Squad ==
As of 15 August 2016

Note: Flags indicate national team as defined under FIFA eligibility rules; some limited exceptions apply. Players may hold more than one non-FIFA nationality.

No.	Pos.	Nation	Player
1	GK	SWE	Andreas Isaksson
2	DF	SWE	Tim Björkström
3	DF	SWE	Elliot Käck
4	DF	SWE	Jacob Une Larsson
6	MF	SWE	Alexander Faltsetas
7	MF	KOR	Moon Seon-min
8	MF	SWE	Kevin Walker (captain)
9	MF	BIH	Haris Radetinac
10	MF	NOR	Daniel Berntsen
11	FW	SWE	Amadou Jawo
12	GK	NOR	Kenneth Høie
13	FW	SWE	Mathias Ranégie (on loan from Watford)
14	MF	SWE	Besard Sabovic
16	DF	SWE	Jonathan Augustinsson

No.	Pos.	Nation	Player
17	FW	KEN	Michael Olunga
18	MF	SWE	Kerim Mrabti
19	DF	SWE	Marcus Hansson (vice captain)
21	MF	RSA	Mihlali Mayambela
22	MF	SWE	Jesper Karlström
24	FW	ZIM	Tino Kadewere
27	DF	GAM	Kebba Ceesay
28	DF	NOR	Niklas Gunnarsson
31	DF	SWE	Marcus Enström
36	MF	SWE	Filip Tasic
37	DF	SWE	Wilhelm Loeper
58	MF	NED	Othman El Kabir
77	MF	SWE	Magnus Eriksson

=== Out on loan ===
As of 11 August 2016

Note: Flags indicate national team as defined under FIFA eligibility rules; some limited exceptions apply. Players may hold more than one non-FIFA nationality.

No.	Pos.	Nation	Player
23	GK	SWE	Hampus Nilsson (at Östersunds FK until 8 January 2017)
25	GK	SWE	Oscar Jonsson (at Håbo FF until 8 January 2017)
31	DF	THA	Kevin Deeromram (at Åtvidabergs FF until 8 January 2017)
32	DF	SWE	Michael Jahn (at Karlbergs BK until 8 January 2017)

No.	Pos.	Nation	Player
40	FW	SWE	Samuel Holm (at Åtvidabergs FF until 8 January 2017)
41	FW	SWE	Marijan Ćosić (at Åtvidabergs FF until 8 January 2017)}
—	MF	KOR	Yoon Soo-yong (at Assyriska FF until 8 January 2017)

== Transfers ==
=== Winter ===
In: Note: Flags indicate national team as defined under FIFA eligibility rules; some limited exceptions apply. Players may hold more than one non-FIFA nationality.

No.	Pos.	Nation	Player
4	DF	SWE	Jacob Une Larsson (from (Sweden) Brommapojkarna)
7	MF	KOR	Moon Seon-min (from (Sweden) Östersund)
13	FW	SWE	Mathias Ranégie (on loan from (England) Watford)
14	MF	SWE	Besard Sabović (promoted)
16	DF	SWE	Jonathan Augustinsson (from (Sweden) Brommapojkarna)
17	FW	KEN	Michael Olunga (from (Kenya) Gor Mahia)
19	DF	SWE	Marcus Hansson (from (Norway) Tromsø)
21	MF	RSA	Mihlali Mayambela (from (South Africa) Cape Town All Stars)
24	FW	ZIM	Tino Kadewere (from (Zimbabwe) Harare City)

Out: Note: Flags indicate national team as defined under FIFA eligibility rules; some limited exceptions apply. Players may hold more than one non-FIFA nationality.

No.	Pos.	Nation	Player
2	DF	SWE	Jesper Arvidsson (to (Norway) Vålerenga)
3	DF	SWE	Fredrik Stenman (released)
13	DF	SWE	Emil Bergström (to (Russia) Rubin Kazan)
16	FW	SWE	Sebastian Andersson (to (Sweden) IFK Norrköping)
19	MF	KOR	Yoon Soo-Yong (on loan to (Sweden) Assyriska)
—	DF	SWE	Jakob Glasberg (to (Sweden) Frej)
—	MF	SWE	Tim Söderström (released, previously on loan at (Sweden) Jönköpings Södra)

=== Summer ===
In: Note: Flags indicate national team as defined under FIFA eligibility rules; some limited exceptions apply. Players may hold more than one non-FIFA nationality.

No.	Pos.	Nation	Player
28	DF	NOR	Niklas Gunnarsson (from (Norway) Vålerenga)
77	FW	SWE	Magnus Eriksson (from (Denmark) Brøndby)

Out: Note: Flags indicate national team as defined under FIFA eligibility rules; some limited exceptions apply. Players may hold more than one non-FIFA nationality.

No.	Pos.	Nation	Player
5	DF	SWE	Stefan Karlsson (to (Sweden) Östersund)
15	DF	GAM	Omar Colley (from (Belgium) Racing Genk)
20	FW	LBR	Sam Johnson (to (China) Wuhan Zall)

== Competitions ==
=== Allsvenskan ===
==== Results summary ====
Overall								Home						Away					
Pld	W	D	L	GF	GA	GD	Pts	W	D	L	GF	GA	GD	W	D	L	GF	GA	GD
30	14	1	15	48	47	+1	43	8	1	6	27	22	+5	6	0	9	21	25	−4

Last updated: 6 November 2016.
Source: See Results

==== Results by round ====
Round	1	2	3	4	5	6	7	8	9	10	11	12	13	14	15	16	17	18	19	20	21	22	23	24	25	26	27	28	29	30
Ground	A	H	A	H	A	A	H	A	A	H	H	A	H	A	H	A	H	H	A	H	A	H	H	A	H	A	H	A	H	A
Result	W	W	W	L	L	L	W	L	L	L	W	L	L	L	L	L	W	D	L	W	W	W	L	W	W	L	L	W	W	W
Position	2	1	1	1	3	7	3	8	11	13	8	10	11	13	13	14	14	13	13	13	12	11	12	10	10	10	11	11	9	7

Source: See Results
A = Away; H = Home; W = Win; D = Draw; L = Loss

==== Results ====
3 April 2016 1	Örebro	0 – 2	Djurgårdens IF	Örebro
17:30 CEST (UTC+2)	Ring (yellow card) 31'; Persson (yellow card) 69'	Report	Johnson 24'; Colley 56'	Stadium: Behrn Arena; Attendance: 11,247; Referee: Mohammed Al-Hakim

7 April 2016 2	Djurgårdens IF	5 – 0	Falkenberg	Stockholm
19:00 CEST (UTC+2)	Johnson 6', 54'; Ranégie 13' (pen.); Walker 66'; Colley 71'	Report	Carlsson (yellow card) 39'; Juel-Nielsen (yellow card) 64'	Stadium: Tele2 Arena; Attendance: 15,134; Referee: Magnus Lindgren

10 April 2016 3	Gefle	1 – 2	Djurgårdens IF	Gävle
15:00 CEST (UTC+2)	Nadeau (yellow card) 21'; Skrabb 49'	Report	Björkström (yellow card) 37'; Johnson 77'; Walker (yellow card) 84' (goal) 90+1'	Stadium: Gavlevallen; Attendance: 5,042; Referee: Jonas Eriksson

19 April 2016 4	Djurgårdens IF	1 – 3	Hammarby	Stockholm
19:00 CEST (UTC+2)	Johnson 25'; Ranégie (yellow card) 90+2'	Report	Alex 12', 41'; Israelsson 62'; Haglund (yellow card) 75'	Stadium: Tele2 Arena; Attendance: 24,900; Referee: Andreas Ekberg

24 April 2016 5	Malmö	1 – 0	Djurgårdens IF	Malmö
15:00 CEST (UTC+2)	Carvalho 62'	Report	Hansson (yellow card) 1'; Sabovic (yellow card) 85'	Stadium: Swedbank Stadion; Attendance: 18,734; Referee: Mohammed Al-Hakim

28 April 2016 6	Elfsborg	3 – 0	Djurgårdens IF	Borås
19:00 CEST (UTC+2)	Claesson (yellow card) 13' (goal) 43'; Nilsson 36'; Prodell 66'; Jönsson (yellow card) 83'	Report	Karlsson (yellow card) 17'	Stadium: Borås Arena; Attendance: 6,402; Referee: Bojan Pandzic

2 May 2016 7	Djurgårdens IF	3 – 0	Östersund	Stockholm
19:00 CEST (UTC+2)	Moon 17'; Johnson 18'; Björkström (yellow card) 30'; Faltsetas (yellow card) 49'; Ranégie (yellow card) 63' (goal) 69'	Report	Nouri (yellow card) 52'	Stadium: Tele2 Arena; Attendance: 11,275; Referee: Markus Strömbergsson

9 May 2016 8	Göteborg	2 – 1	Djurgårdens IF	Gothenburg
19:00 CEST (UTC+2)	Engvall 61'; Hysén 82'	Report	Faltsetas (yellow card) 14'; Sabovic 53'	Stadium: Gamla Ullevi; Attendance: 12,214; Referee: Stefan Johannesson

16 May 2016 9	AIK	2 – 0	Djurgårdens IF	Stockholm
19:00 CEST (UTC+2)	Ishizaki 12' (yellow card) 67'; Hauksson 51'	Report	Colley (yellow card) 73'	Stadium: Friends Arena; Attendance: 26,109; Referee: Bojan Pandžić

19 May 2016 10	Djurgårdens IF	0 – 3	Kalmar	Stockholm
19:00 CEST (UTC+2)		Report	Antonsson 15', 90+1'; Ismael (yellow card) 44'; Ring 51'	Stadium: Tele2 Arena; Attendance: 11,114; Referee: Andreas Ekberg

22 May 2016 11	Djurgårdens IF	3 – 0	Helsingborg	Stockholm
17:30 CEST (UTC+2)	Johnson 12'; Berntsen 51'; Karlström 84'	Report		Stadium: Tele2 Arena; Attendance: 13,183; Referee: Glenn Nyberg

29 May 2016 12	BK Häcken	3 – 1	Djurgårdens IF	Gothenburg
17:30 CEST (UTC+2)	Paulinho 12', 45'; Abubakari (yellow card) 24'; Owoeri 57'; Sudić (yellow card) 85'	Report	Ranégie 16'; Colley (yellow card) 31'; Käck (yellow card) 88'	Stadium: Bravida Arena; Attendance: 4,059; Referee: Kaspar Sjöberg

9 July 2016 13	Djurgårdens IF	0 – 1	Norrköping	Stockholm
16:00 CEST (UTC+2)	Colley (yellow card) 90+1'	Report	Andersson 67'; Vaikla (yellow card) 90+3'	Stadium: Tele2 Arena; Attendance: 13,598; Referee: Martin Strömbergsson

18 July 2016 14	Jönköpings Södra	1 – 0	Djurgårdens IF	Jönköping
19:00 CEST (UTC+2)	Thelin 18'; Smylie (yellow card) 63'; Kozica (yellow card) 73'; Cibicki (yellow card) 90+1'	Report	Faltsetas (yellow card) 45+2'	Stadium: Stadsparksvallen; Attendance: 5,811; Referee: Glenn Nyberg

25 July 2016 15	Djurgårdens IF	1 – 3	GIF Sundsvall	Stockholm
19:00 CEST (UTC+2)	Walker (yellow card) 39'; El Kabir (yellow card) 72'; Kadewere 90+4'	Report	Silva 58', 75'; Larsson (yellow card) 87'; Granat 90+2'	Stadium: Tele2 Arena; Attendance: 10,157; Referee: Stefan Johannesson

1 August 2016 16	Kalmar	2 – 1	Djurgårdens IF	Kalmar
19:00 CEST (UTC+2)	Romário (yellow card) 36' (goal) 74'; Colley 69' (o.g.)	Report	Walker 4'; Eriksson (yellow card) 59'; Faltsetas (yellow card) 76'	Stadium: Guldfågeln Arena; Attendance: 8,336; Referee: Johan Hamlin

8 August 2016 17	Djurgårdens IF	3 – 1	Göteborg	Stockholm
19:00 CEST (UTC+2)	Björkström (yellow card) 8'; Olunga 28', 65'; Ranégie 29'; Faltsetas (yellow card) 73'	Report	Pettersson 24'; Rogne (yellow card) 75'	Stadium: Tele2 Arena; Attendance: 13,681; Referee: Andreas Ekberg

14 August 2016 18	Djurgårdens IF	2 – 2	Elfsborg	Stockholm
17:30 CEST (UTC+2)	Olunga 29'; Eriksson 55'; Käck (yellow card) 78'	Report	Frick 25'; Ellegaard (yellow card) 45'; Prodell 50'	Stadium: Tele2 Arena; Attendance: 12,514; Referee: Mohammed Al Hakim

20 August 2016 19	Östersund	1 – 0	Djurgårdens IF	Östersund
16:00 CEST (UTC+2)	Sema 13'; Keita (yellow card) 59'; Widgren (yellow card) 68'; Papagiannopoulos (yellow card) 79'	Report	Walker (yellow card) 83'	Stadium: Jämtkraft Arena; Attendance: 8,027; Referee: Martin Strömbergsson

27 August 2016 20	Djurgårdens IF	2 – 1	Gefle	Stockholm
16:00 CEST (UTC+2)	Gunnarsson 17'; Olunga 86'	Report	Bertilsson 70'	Stadium: Tele2 Arena; Attendance: 10,925; Referee: Glenn Nyberg

11 September 2016 21	Falkenberg	1 – 2	Djurgårdens IF	Falkenberg
15:00 CEST (UTC+2)	Rodevåg (yellow card) 2'; Carlsson (yellow card) 19'; Kwakwa (yellow card) 88'; Araba (yellow card) 90+2'	Report	Gunnarsson (yellow card) 9'; Ranégie 34'; Ceesay (yellow card) 62'; Isaksson (yellow card) 70'; Olunga 75' (yellow card) 76'	Stadium: Falkenbergs IP; Attendance: 3,429; Referee: Bojan Pandzic

18 September 2016 22	Djurgårdens IF	3 – 1	Malmö	Stockholm
17:30 CEST (UTC+2)	Eriksson 7'; Olunga 16', 60'	Report	Eikrem 20'; Christiansen (yellow card) 78'	Stadium: Tele2 Arena; Attendance: 15,370; Referee: Mohammed Al Hakim

21 September 2016 23	Djurgårdens IF	0 – 3	AIK	Stockholm
19:00 CEST (UTC+2)	Ranégie (yellow card) 66'; Björkström (yellow card) 68'; Ceesay (yellow card) 90+3'	Report	Isak 15', 65'; Obasi 76'; Ofori (yellow card) 82'	Stadium: Tele2 Arena; Attendance: 22,197; Referee: Stefan Johannesson

26 September 2016 24	Norrköping	1 – 3	Djurgårdens IF	Norrköping
19:00 CEST (UTC+2)	Wahlqvist (yellow card) 40'; Sjölund (yellow card) 48'; Holmberg 62'; Falk-Olander (yellow card) 79'	Report	Gunnarsson 50'; Olunga 55' (yellow card) 68'; Kadewere (yellow card) 63'; Berntsen 84'	Stadium: Nya Parken; Attendance: 12,682; Referee: Kaspar Sjöberg

2 October 2016 25	Djurgårdens IF	3 – 2	Örebro	Stockholm
17:30 CEST (UTC+2)	Larsson 5'; Walker (yellow card) 8'; Faltsetas 13'; Käck 59'	Report	Ring (yellow card) 15'; Sema 40'; Ayaz 76'; Persson (yellow card) 77'	Stadium: Tele2 Arena; Attendance: 10,683; Referee: Bojan Pandzic

17 October 2016 26	Hammarby	4 – 2	Djurgårdens IF	Stockholm
19:00 CEST (UTC+2)	Rômulo 34', 54', 76'; Sævarsson (yellow card) 38'; Persson (yellow card) 38'; Smárason 40' (yellow card) 82'; Sætra (yellow card) 70'; Solheim (yellow card) 89'	Report	Walker 3'; Ranégie 32' (yellow card) 65'; Ceesay (yellow card) 86'	Stadium: Tele2 Arena; Attendance: 28,493; Referee: Andreas Ekberg

24 October 2016 27	Djurgårdens IF	0 – 2	Jönköpings Södra	Stockholm
19:00 CEST (UTC+2)	Gunnarsson (yellow card) 43'	Report	Siwe (yellow card) 35'; Smylie 45+1'; Kozica 50'	Stadium: Tele2 Arena; Attendance: 6,724; Referee: Kristoffer Karlsson

27 October 2016 28	Helsingborg	1 – 2	Djurgårdens IF	Helsingborg
19:00 CEST (UTC+2)	Achinioti-Jönsson (yellow card) 9'; Samuel (yellow card) 56'; Larsson 66'; Larsson (yellow card) 77'; Dahlberg (yellow card) 79'	Report	Olunga 31', 67' (yellow card) 90+2'	Stadium: Olympia; Attendance: 7,215; Referee: Mohammed Al Hakim

31 October 2016 29	Djurgårdens IF	1 – 0	BK Häcken	Stockholm
19:00 CET (UTC+1)	Walker (yellow card) 12'; Kadewere (yellow card) 23' (goal) 66'; Faltsetas (yellow card) 90+1'	Report	Schüller (yellow card) 8'	Stadium: Tele2 Arena; Attendance: 9,434; Referee: Markus Strömbergsson

6 November 2016 30	GIF Sundsvall	2 – 5	Djurgårdens IF	Sundsvall
15:00 CET (UTC+1)	Sundberg 9'; Wilson 60'	Report	Olunga 14', 55'; Walker (yellow card) 30'; El Kabir 36'; Kadewere 69'; Eriksson 84'	Stadium: Norrporten Arena; Attendance: 3,295; Referee: Glenn Nyberg

==== League table ====
Pos	Team	Pld	W	D	L	GF	GA	GD	Pts	Qualification or relegation
5	IF Elfsborg	30	13	9	8	58	38	+20	48	
6	Kalmar FF	30	12	8	10	45	40	+5	44	
7	Djurgårdens IF	30	14	1	15	48	47	+1	43	
8	Östersunds FK	30	12	6	12	44	46	−2	42	Qualification for the Europa League second qualifying round (Note: Östersunds FK qualified for the Europa League second qualifying round by winning the 2016–17 Svenska Cupen.)
9	Örebro SK	30	11	8	11	48	51	−3	41	

Source: svenskfotboll.se (in Swedish)
Rules for classification: 1) Points; 2) Goal difference; 3) Goals scored; 4) Head-to-head points; 5) Head-to-head goal difference; 6) Head-to-head away goals scored; 7) Play-off
(Note: Play-off is only played if need to decide champion, teams for relegation or UEFA competition and will be played on a neutral ground).

=== 2015–16 Svenska Cupen ===
==== Group stage ====
Pos	Team	Pld	W	D	L	GF	GA	GD	Pts	Qualification
1	Hammarby IF	3	2	1	0	7	3	+4	7	Advance to Knockout stage
2	Syrianska FC	3	2	1	0	2	0	+2	7	
3	Djurgårdens IF	3	1	0	2	3	5	−2	3	
4	Ljungskile SK	3	0	0	3	3	7	−4	0	

Source: Swedish Football Association
Rules for classification: 1) Points; 2) Goal difference; 3) Goals scored; 4) Head-to-head record; 5) Highest ranked team

22 February 2016 1	Djurgårdens IF	2 – 1	Ljungskile SK	Stockholm
19:00 CET (UTC+1)	A.Strömberg 57' (o.g.); Andersson 85'	Report	Olsson 76'; Mohideen (yellow card) 83'; Suleiman (yellow card) 90+2'	Stadium: Tele2 Arena; Attendance: 6,409; Referee: Jonas Eriksson

28 February 2016 2	Syrianska FC	1 – 0	Djurgårdens IF	Södertälje
14:00 CET (UTC+1)	B.Katourgi (yellow card) 45' (goal) 53'; S.Nwosu (yellow card) 45'; Michel (yellow card) 90'	Report	Walker (yellow card) 30' (yellow-red card) 50'	Stadium: Södertälje Fotbollsarena; Referee: Mohammed Al-Hakim

6 March 2016 3	Djurgårdens IF	1 – 3	Hammarby IF	Stockholm
14:00 CET (UTC+1)	Andersson 4'; Käck (yellow card) 42'; Colley (yellow card) 76'	Report	Alex 20'; Persson 26' (yellow card) 76'; Magyar (yellow card) 35'; Torsteinbø (yellow card) 39'; Khalili (yellow card) 58'; Haglund (yellow card) 74' (goal) 78'; Sætra (yellow card) 78'	Stadium: Tele2 Arena; Attendance: 21,367; Referee: Farouk Nehdi

=== 2016–17 Svenska Cupen ===
24 August 2016 Round 2	Smedby AIS	1 – 5	Djurgårdens IF	Norrköping
19:00 CET (UTC+1)	P.Chamoun 89' (pen.)	Report	Karlström 46'; El Kabir 56', 76'; Mayambela 66'; Berntsen 86'	Stadium: Mirum Arena; Attendance: 1,500; Referee: Jim Petersson

Group stage took place during the 2017 season.

== Squad statistics ==
As of match played 20 May 2017

=== Appearances and goals ===
No.	Pos	Nat	Player	Total		Allsvenskan		2015–16 Svenska Cupen		2016–17 Svenska Cupen	
No.	Pos	Nat	Player	Apps	Goals	Apps	Goals	Apps	Goals	Apps	Goals
1	GK	(Sweden) SWE	Andreas Isaksson	8	0	7	0	0	0	1	0
2	DF	(Sweden) SWE	Tim Björkström	24	0	22	0	1	0	0+1	0
3	DF	(Sweden) SWE	Elliot Käck	34	1	30	1	3	0	1	0
4	DF	(Sweden) SWE	Jacob Une Larsson	16	1	10+3	1	1+1	0	1	0
6	MF	(Sweden) SWE	Alexander Faltsetas	29	1	25+1	1	3	0	0	0
7	MF	(South Korea) KOR	Moon Seon-min	10	1	6+4	1	0	0	0	0
8	MF	(Sweden) SWE	Kevin Walker	27	4	24+1	4	2	0	0	0
9	MF	(Bosnia and Herzegovina) BIH	Haris Radetinac	2	0	1+1	0	0	0	0	0
10	MF	(Norway) NOR	Daniel Berntsen	29	3	14+11	2	3	0	1	1
11	FW	(Sweden) SWE	Amadou Jawo	18	0	3+12	0	0+2	0	1	0
12	GK	(Norway) NOR	Kenneth Høie	17	0	16	0	1	0	0	0
13	FW	(Sweden) SWE	Mathias Ranégie	24	6	20+4	6	0	0	0	0
14	MF	(Sweden) SWE	Besard Sabović	8	1	3+4	1	0	0	0+1	0
16	FW	(Sweden) SWE	Sebastian Andersson	3	1	0	0	3	1	0	0
17	FW	(Kenya) KEN	Michael Olunga	28	12	18+9	12	0+1	0	0	0
19	DF	(Sweden) SWE	Marcus Hansson	21	0	18+1	0	2	0	0	0
21	MF	(South Africa) RSA	Mihlali Mayambela	10	1	1+7	0	0+1	0	1	1
22	MF	(Sweden) SWE	Jesper Karlström	20	2	11+5	1	3	0	1	1
23	GK	(Sweden) SWE	Hampus Nilsson	8	0	6	0	2	0	0	0
24	FW	(Zimbabwe) ZIM	Tino Kadewere	25	3	8+13	3	1+2	0	1	0
25	GK	(Sweden) SWE	Oscar Jonsson	1	0	1	0	0	0	0	0
27	DF	(The Gambia) GAM	Kebba Ceesay	15	0	14	0	0	0	1	0
28	DF	(Norway) NOR	Niklas Gunnarsson	14	2	13	2	0	0	1	0
39	MF	(Sweden) SWE	Filip Tasic	2	0	0+1	0	0	0	0+1	0
58	MF	(Netherlands) NED	Othman El Kabir	14	3	12+1	1	0	0	1	2
77	MF	(Sweden) SWE	Magnus Eriksson	17	3	17	3	0	0	0	0
Players away from Djurgårdens on loan:
Players who left Djurgårdens during the season:
5	DF	(Sweden) SWE	Stefan Karlsson	6	0	2+2	0	2	0	0	0
15	DF	(The Gambia) GAM	Omar Colley	20	2	16+1	2	3	0	0	0
20	FW	(Liberia) LBR	Sam Johnson	15	7	12	7	3	0	0	0

=== Goal scorers ===
Place	Position	Nation	Number	Name	Allsvenskan	2015–16 Svenska Cupen	2016–17 Svenska Cupen	Total
1	FW	(Kenya)	17	Michael Olunga	12	0	0	12
2	FW	(Liberia)	20	Sam Johnson	7	0	0	7
3	FW	(Sweden)	13	Mathias Ranégie	6	0	0	6
4	MF	(Sweden)	8	Kevin Walker	4	0	0	4
5	FW	(Zimbabwe)	24	Tino Kadewere	3	0	0	3
5	MF	(Sweden)	77	Magnus Eriksson	3	0	0	3
5	MF	(Norway)	10	Daniel Berntsen	2	0	1	3
5	MF	(Netherlands)	58	Othman El Kabir	1	0	2	3
9	DF	(The Gambia)	15	Omar Colley	2	0	0	2
9	DF	(Norway)	28	Niklas Gunnarsson	2	0	0	2
9	DF	(Sweden)	4	Jacob Une Larsson	1	1	0	2
9	MF	(Sweden)	22	Jesper Karlström	1	0	1	2
13	MF	(South Korea)	7	Moon Seon-min	1	0	0	1
13	MF	(Sweden)	14	Besard Sabovic	1	0	0	1
13	MF	(Sweden)	6	Alexander Faltsetas	1	0	0	1
13	DF	(Sweden)	3	Elliot Käck	1	0	0	1
13	FW	(Sweden)	16	Sebastian Andersson	0	1	0	1
13	MF	(South Africa)	21	Mihlali Mayambela	0	0	1	0
13				Own goal	0	1	0	0
				TOTALS	48	3	5	56

=== Disciplinary record ===
Number	Nation	Position	Name	Allsvenskan		2015–16 Svenska Cupen		2016–17 Svenska Cupen		Total	
Number	Nation	Position	Name	Yellow card	Red card	Yellow card	Red card	Yellow card	Red card	Yellow card	Red card
1	(Sweden)	GK	Andreas Isaksson	1	0	0	0	0	0	1	0
2	(Sweden)	DF	Tim Björkström	4	0	0	0	0	0	4	0
3	(Sweden)	DF	Elliot Käck	2	0	1	0	0	0	3	0
5	(Sweden)	DF	Stefan Karlsson	1	0	0	0	0	0	1	0
6	(Sweden)	MF	Alexander Faltsetas	6	0	0	0	0	0	6	0
8	(Sweden)	MF	Kevin Walker	6	0	2	1	0	0	8	1
13	(Sweden)	FW	Mathias Ranégie	4	0	0	0	0	0	4	0
14	(Sweden)	MF	Besard Sabovic	1	0	0	0	0	0	1	0
15	(The Gambia)	DF	Omar Colley	3	0	1	0	0	0	4	0
17	(Kenya)	FW	Michael Olunga	3	0	0	0	0	0	3	0
19	(Sweden)	DF	Marcus Hansson	1	0	0	0	0	0	1	0
24	(Zimbabwe)	FW	Tino Kadewere	2	0	0	0	0	0	2	0
27	(The Gambia)	DF	Kebba Ceesay	3	0	0	0	0	0	3	0
28	(Norway)	DF	Niklas Gunnarsson	2	0	0	0	0	0	2	0
58	(Netherlands)	MF	Othman El Kabir	1	0	0	0	0	0	1	0
77	(Sweden)	MF	Magnus Eriksson	1	0	0	0	0	0	1	0
			TOTALS	41	0	4	1	0	0	45	1
