= 2017 Djurgårdens IF season =

Djurgårdens IF Fotboll
2017 season
- Chairman: Lars-Erik Sjöberg
- Manager: Özcan Melkemichel
- Stadium: Tele2 Arena
- Allsvenskan: 3rd
- Svenska Cupen: Group stage
- Top goalscorer: League: Magnus Eriksson (14); All: Magnus Eriksson (14)
- Highest home attendance: 26,648 (3 April vs IK Sirius, Allsvenskan)
- Lowest home attendance: 4,024 (4 March vs Helsingborg, Svenskanska Cupen)
Home colours	Away colours	Third colours

The 2017 season was Djurgårdens IF's 117th in existence, their 62nd season in Allsvenskan and their 17th consecutive season in the league. They were competing in Allsvenskan and Svenska Cupen and qualified for the 2018–19 UEFA Europa League.

== Squad ==
As of 15 August 2017

Note: Flags indicate national team as defined under FIFA eligibility rules; some limited exceptions apply. Players may hold more than one non-FIFA nationality.

No.	Pos.	Nation	Player
1	GK	SWE	Andreas Isaksson
3	DF	SWE	Elliot Käck
4	DF	SWE	Jacob Une Larsson
5	DF	NOR	Niklas Gunnarsson
6	MF	SWE	Jesper Karlström
7	MF	SWE	Magnus Eriksson (vice captain)
8	MF	SWE	Kevin Walker
9	MF	BIH	Haris Radetinac
10	MF	SWE	Kerim Mrabti
11	FW	SWE	Amadou Jawo
12	DF	SWE	Jonathan Augustinsson
13	DF	SWE	Jonas Olsson

No.	Pos.	Nation	Player
15	DF	CIV	Souleymane Kone
16	MF	SWE	Kim Källström (captain)
17	FW	SWE	Gustav Engvall (on loan from Bristol City)
19	DF	SWE	Marcus Hansson
20	FW	SEN	Aliou Badji
21	FW	NOR	Julian Kristoffersen
22	DF	SWE	Felix Beijmo
23	MF	SWE	Joseph Ceesay
24	FW	ZIM	Tino Kadewere
29	FW	NGR	Haruna Garba
30	GK	SWE	Tommi Vaiho
58	MF	NED	Othman El Kabir

=== Out on loan ===
As of 31 March 2017

Note: Flags indicate national team as defined under FIFA eligibility rules; some limited exceptions apply. Players may hold more than one non-FIFA nationality.

No.	Pos.	Nation	Player
2	DF	SWE	Tim Björkström (at Östersunds FK until 8 January 2018)
14	MF	SWE	Besard Sabovic (at IF Brommapojkarna until 8 January 2018)
21	MF	RSA	Mihlali Mayambela (at Degerfors IF until 8 January 2018)

No.	Pos.	Nation	Player
25	GK	SWE	Oscar Jonsson (at Enskede IK until 8 January 2018)
31	DF	SWE	Marcus Enström (at Vasalunds IF until 8 January 2018)
36	MF	SWE	Filip Tasic (at Arameiska-Syrianska IF until 8 January 2018)

== Transfers ==
=== Winter ===
In: Note: Flags indicate national team as defined under FIFA eligibility rules; some limited exceptions apply. Players may hold more than one non-FIFA nationality.

No.	Pos.	Nation	Player
13	DF	SWE	Jonas Olsson (from (England) West Bromwich Albion)
15	FW	CIV	Souleymane Kone (from (Armenia) FC Ararat Yerevan)
16	MF	SWE	Kim Källström (from (Switzerland) Grasshoppers)
17	FW	SWE	Gustav Engvall (on loan from (England) Bristol City)
20	FW	SEN	Aliou Badji (from (Senegal) Casa Sports)
22	FW	SWE	Felix Beijmo (from (Sweden) IF Brommapojkarna)
29	FW	NGR	Haruna Garba (from (United Arab Emirates) Dubai CSC)
30	FW	SWE	Tommi Vaiho (from (Sweden) GAIS)

Out: Note: Flags indicate national team as defined under FIFA eligibility rules; some limited exceptions apply. Players may hold more than one non-FIFA nationality.

No.	Pos.	Nation	Player
2	DF	SWE	Tim Björkström (on loan to (Sweden) Östersunds FK)
6	MF	SWE	Alexander Faltsetas (to (Sweden) BK Häcken)
7	MF	KOR	Moon Seon-min (to (South Korea) Incheon United)
10	MF	NOR	Daniel Berntsen (to (Norway) Vålerenga IF)
12	GK	NOR	Kenneth Høie (retired)
13	FW	SWE	Mathias Ranégie (loan return to (England) Watford)
14	MF	SWE	Besard Sabovic (on loan to (Sweden) Brommapojkarna)
17	FW	KEN	Michael Olunga (to (China) Guizhou Hengfeng Zhicheng)
23	GK	SWE	Hampus Nilsson (to (Sweden) Falkenbergs FF)
21	MF	RSA	Mihlali Mayambela (on loan to (Sweden) Degerfors IF)
27	DF	GAM	Kebba Ceesay (to (Sweden) Dalkurd)
31	DF	THA	Kevin Deeromram (to (Thailand) Ratchaburi Mitr Phol)
31	DF	SWE	Marcus Enström (on loan to (Sweden) Vasalund)

=== Summer ===
In: Note: Flags indicate national team as defined under FIFA eligibility rules; some limited exceptions apply. Players may hold more than one non-FIFA nationality.

No.	Pos.	Nation	Player
17	FW	SWE	Gustav Engvall (on loan from (England) Bristol City)
21	FW	NOR	Julian Kristoffersen (from (Denmark) Copenhagen)

Out: Note: Flags indicate national team as defined under FIFA eligibility rules; some limited exceptions apply. Players may hold more than one non-FIFA nationality.

No.	Pos.	Nation	Player
17	FW	SWE	Gustav Engvall (loan return to (England) Bristol City)

== Competitions ==
=== Allsvenskan ===
==== Results summary ====
Overall								Home						Away					
Pld	W	D	L	GF	GA	GD	Pts	W	D	L	GF	GA	GD	W	D	L	GF	GA	GD
30	15	8	7	53	30	+23	53	8	4	3	28	14	+14	7	4	4	25	16	+9

Last updated: 5 November 2017.
Source: See Results

==== Results by round ====
Round	1	2	3	4	5	6	7	8	9	10	11	12	13	14	15	16	17	18	19	20	21	22	23	24	25	26	27	28	29	30
Ground	H	A	H	A	A	H	A	H	A	H	H	A	H	H	A	H	A	H	A	H	A	A	H	A	H	A	A	H	H	A
Result	L	D	W	L	W	D	W	W	D	L	W	L	W	W	L	W	W	L	W	W	D	W	W	D	D	W	L	D	D	W
Position	15	15	7	11	14	8	2	3	5	6	3	6	6	5	6	3	2	3	2	2	2	2	2	2	2	2	2	3	3	3

Source: See Results
A = Away; H = Home; W = Win; D = Draw; L = Loss

==== League table ====
Pos	Team	Pld	W	D	L	GF	GA	GD	Pts	Qualification or relegation
1	Malmö FF (C)	30	19	7	4	63	27	+36	64	Qualification for the Champions League first qualifying round
2	AIK	30	16	9	5	47	22	+25	57	Qualification for the Europa League first qualifying round
3	Djurgårdens IF	30	15	8	7	54	30	+24	53	Qualification for the Europa League second qualifying round (Note: Since the winners of 2017–18 Svenska Cupen (Djurgårdens IF) qualified for European competitions based on their league position, the berth awarded to the 3rd-placed team (Europa League second qualifying round) was passed down to the 4th-placed team (BK Häcken).)
4	BK Häcken	30	14	10	6	42	28	+14	52	Qualification for the Europa League first qualifying round
5	Östersunds FK	30	13	11	6	48	32	+16	50	

Source: svenskfotboll.se (in Swedish)
Rules for classification: 1) Points; 2) Goal difference; 3) Goals scored; 4) Head-to-head points; 5) Head-to-head goal difference; 6) Head-to-head away goals scored; 7) Play-off
(Note: Play-off is only played if need to decide champion, teams for relegation or UEFA competition and will be played on a neutral ground).
(C) Champions

==== Results ====
3 April 2017 1	Djurgårdens IF	0 – 2	IK Sirius	Stockholm
19:00 CEST (UTC+2)	Larsson (yellow card) 25'; Mrabti (yellow card) 57'; Garba (yellow card) 77'; Beijmo (yellow card) 81'	Report	Gustafsson (yellow card) 26'; Ogbu (yellow card) 39'; Sarfo 54', 55'	Stadium: Tele2 Arena; Attendance: 26,648; Referee: Mohammed Al Hakim

9 April 2017 2	BK Häcken	0 – 0	Djurgårdens IF	Gothenburg
17:30 CEST (UTC+2)	Lindgren (yellow card) 26'; Friberg (yellow card) 55'; Paulinho (yellow card) 70'	Report	Eriksson (yellow card) 24'; Kadewere (yellow card) 45+4'; El Kabir (yellow card) 64'; Walker (yellow card) 70'; Källström (yellow card) 89'	Stadium: Bravida Arena; Attendance: 5,541; Referee: Markus Strömbergsson

16 April 2017 3	Djurgårdens IF	3 – 0	IF Elfsborg	Stockholm
17:30 CEST (UTC+2)	Engvall 2'; Mrabti 5'; Eriksson 51'	Report	Dyer (yellow card) 22'; Jebali (yellow card) 53'; Randrup (yellow card) 55'	Stadium: Tele2 Arena; Attendance: 11,435; Referee: Andreas Ekberg

24 April 2017 4	Malmö FF	3 – 2	Djurgårdens IF	Malmö
19:00 CEST (UTC+2)	Tinnerholm 31' (yellow card) 35'; Nielsen (yellow card) 45+1'; Rakip (yellow card) 49'; Berget 75'; Yotún (yellow card) 81' (goal) 86'	Report	El Kabir (yellow card) 35'; Eriksson 45+2' (pen.); Engvall 65'; Karlström (yellow card) 85'	Stadium: Swedbank Stadion; Attendance: 19,074; Referee: Jonas Eriksson

27 April 2017 5	Halmstads BK	0 – 1	Djurgårdens IF	Halmstad
19:00 CEST (UTC+2)	Hakšabanović (yellow card) 19'; Pękalski (yellow card) 42'; Mathisen (yellow card) 44'; Kojić (yellow card) 84'	Report	El Kabir (yellow card) 14'; Eriksson 85' (pen.); Engvall (yellow card) 88'; Isaksson (yellow card) 90+5'; Källström (yellow card) 90+6'	Stadium: Örjans Vall; Attendance: 4,690; Referee: Johan Hamlin

1 May 2017 6	Djurgårdens IF	3 – 3	IFK Norrköping	Stockholm
17:30 CEST (UTC+2)	Eriksson 23', 65'; Källström (yellow card) 25'; Kadewere 90+3'	Report	Telo 5'; Eliasson 28'; Þórarinsson 89' (yellow card) 90+4'	Stadium: Tele2 Arena; Attendance: 17,104; Referee: Stefan Johannesson

7 May 2017 7	Örebro SK	0 – 4	Djurgårdens IF	Örebro
17:30 CEST (UTC+2)	Mårtensson (yellow card) 20'; Almebäck (yellow card) 23'; Jansson (yellow card) 70'; Ring (yellow card) 82'	Report	Engvall 11', 45+1', 52'; Larsson (yellow card) 35'; Mrabti 68'	Stadium: Behrn Arena; Attendance: 9,271; Referee: Magnus Lindgren

15 May 2017 8	Djurgårdens IF	1 – 0	IFK Göteborg	Stockholm
19:00 CEST (UTC+2)	Larsson (yellow card) 28'; Karlström 79'	Report	Diskerud (yellow card) 68'; Rogne (yellow card) 89'	Stadium: Tele2 Arena; Attendance: 16,299; Referee: Andreas Ekberg

18 May 2017 9	Jönköpings Södra IF	1 – 1	Djurgårdens IF	Jönköping
19:00 CEST (UTC+2)	Kozica 45'	Report	Eriksson 46'; Käck (yellow card) 73'	Stadium: Stadsparksvallen; Attendance: 5,175; Referee: Patrik Eriksson

22 May 2017 10	Djurgårdens IF	0 – 1	AIK	Stockholm
19:00 CEST (UTC+2)		Report	Thern 20'; Vrdoljak (yellow card) 47'	Stadium: Tele2 Arena; Attendance: 25,754; Referee: Mohammed Al Hakim

27 May 2017 11	Djurgårdens IF	4 – 1	AFC Eskilstuna	Stockholm
16:00 CEST (UTC+2)	Walker 28', 76'; Mrabti 52'; El Kabir 64'; Gunnarsson (yellow card) 74'	Report	Erlandsson (yellow card) 53'; Meade (yellow card) 57'; Eddahri 60'; Omeje (yellow card) 78'	Stadium: Tele2 Arena; Attendance: 10,255; Referee: Bojan Pandzic

4 June 2017 12	Hammarby	3 – 1	Djurgårdens IF	Stockholm
15:00 CEST (UTC+2)	Rômulo 58', 83'; Bengtsson (yellow card) 71'; Dibba 90+3'	Report	Engvall 32'	Stadium: Tele2 Arena; Attendance: 29,374; Referee: Andreas Ekberg

3 July 2017 13	Djurgårdens IF	4 – 1	Kalmar	Stockholm
19:00 CEST (UTC+2)	Eriksson 37', 72'; El Kabir 63'; Engvall 84'; Mrabti (yellow card) 90'	Report	Elm (yellow card) 30'; Romário 49' (pen.)	Stadium: Tele2 Arena; Attendance: 11,730; Referee: Kristoffer Karlsson

10 July 2017 14	Djurgårdens	2 – 1	GIF Sundsvall	Stockholm
19:00 CEST (UTC+2)	Walker (yellow card) 11'; Källström 31'; El Kabir 64'	Report	Danielsson (yellow card) 17' (yellow-red card) 42'; Hallenius 23'; Gerson (yellow card) 33'	Stadium: Tele2 Arena; Attendance: 12,439; Referee: Jonas Eriksson

16 July 2017 15	Östersund	2 – 1	Djurgårdens	Östersund
17:30 CEST (UTC+2)	Mensiro 23'; Bergqvist (yellow card) 33' (goal) 50'; Aiesh (yellow card) 68'	Report	Widgren 31' (o.g.); El Kabir (yellow card) 49'; Isaksson (yellow card) 90+4'	Stadium: Jämtkraft Arena; Referee: Andreas Ekberg

23 July 2017 16	Djurgårdens	3 – 0	Östersund	Stockholm
15:00 CEST (UTC+2)	Olsson 43', 86' (yellow card) 55'; Eriksson (yellow card) 66'; Badji 82'	Report	Pettersson (yellow card) 40'; Bachirou (yellow card) 52'; Gero (yellow card) 68'	Stadium: Tele2 Arena; Attendance: 11,762; Referee: Magnus Lindgren

31 July 2017 17	AFC Eskilstuna	1 – 2	Djurgårdens	Eskilstuna
19:00 CEST (UTC+2)	Omeje (yellow card) 20'; Buya Turay (yellow card) 42' (goal) 78'; Haghighi (yellow card) 90+1'	Report	Eriksson (yellow card) 20'; Badji 30'; El Kabir 51'; Karlström (yellow card) 90+1'	Stadium: Tunavallen; Attendance: 7,500; Referee: Johan Krantz

7 August 2017 18	Djurgårdens	0 – 1	Malmö	Stockholm
19:00 CEST (UTC+2)	El Kabir (yellow card) 39'; Källström (yellow card) 40'	Report	Tinnerholm (yellow card) 45+3'; Nielsen (yellow card) 49'; Rakip (yellow card) 52'; Christiansen (yellow card) 56'; Rosenberg (red card) 86'; Gunnarsson 90+4' (o.g.)	Stadium: Tele2 Arena; Attendance: 22,208; Referee: Mohammed Al Hakim

13 August 2017 19	IFK Norrköping	0 – 1	Djurgårdens	Norrköping
17:30 CEST (UTC+2)	Fjóluson (yellow card) 8'; Nilsson (yellow card) 71'	Report	Mrabti (yellow card) 8' (goal) 66'	Stadium: Nya Parken; Attendance: 11,620; Referee: Bojan Pandzic

20 August 2017 20	Djurgårdens	2 – 1	Halmstads BK	Stockholm
15:00 CEST (UTC+2)	Eriksson 28' (pen.); Larsson (yellow card) 64'; Engvall 65'; Olsson (yellow card) 86'	Report	Pettersson (yellow card) 27'; Kojić (yellow card) 33'; Gudmundsson 44'; Alho (yellow card) 87'	Stadium: Tele2 Arena; Attendance: 13,093; Referee: Johan Hamlin

27 August 2017 21	AIK	1 – 1	Djurgårdens	Stockholm
15:00 CEST (UTC+2)	Ishizaki (yellow card) 11'; Karlsson (yellow card) 23'; Obasi 39' (pen.); Hauksson (yellow card) 58'; Linnér (yellow card) 81'; Sundgren (yellow card) 89'	Report	Eriksson (yellow card) 55'; Olsson (yellow card) 65'; Walker (yellow card) 71'; Badji 84'	Stadium: Nationalarenan för fotboll Attendance: 33,157; Referee: Stefan Johannesson

11 September 2017 22	IFK Göteborg	1 – 3	Djurgårdens	Gothenburg
19:00 CEST (UTC+2)	Sakor (yellow card) 29'; Boman 45+1'; Diskerud (yellow card) 74'; Rieks (yellow card) 90+2'	Report	Mrabti 18', 52'; Karlström 54'; Beijmo (yellow card) 76'	Stadium: Gamla Ullevi; Attendance: 12,350; Referee: Bojan Pandzic

16 September 2017 23	Djurgårdens	4 – 1	Örebro SK	Stockholm
16:00 CEST (UTC+2)	Källström 12' (yellow card) 72'; Beijmo 38'; Eriksson 62', 65' (pen.)	Report	Rogić (yellow card) 41'; Besara 57'; Mårtensson (yellow card) 64'	Stadium: Tele2 Arena; Attendance: 14,039; Referee: Jonas Eriksson

19 September 2017 24	IF Elfsborg	2 – 2	Djurgårdens	Borås
19:00 CEST (UTC+2)	Manns (yellow card) 64'; Prodell 67'; Jebali 77' (pen.)	Report	Eriksson 8'; Källström 74'; Olsson (yellow card) 84'	Stadium: Borås Arena; Attendance: 7,423; Referee: Glenn Nyberg

24 September 2017 25	Djurgårdens	1 – 1	Hammarby	Stockholm
15:00 CEST (UTC+2)	Olsson 53' (yellow card) 84'	Report	Bakircioglu (yellow card) 19'; Paulsen 41' (yellow card) 55'; Tanković (yellow card) 68'; Hamad (yellow card) 89'	Stadium: Tele2 Arena; Attendance: 24,174; Referee: Bojan Pandzic

1 October 2017 26	GIF Sundsvall	0 – 5	Djurgårdens	Sundsvall
15:00 CEST (UTC+2)	Larsson (yellow card) 50'	Report	Kadewere 21'; Eriksson 24', 50' (pen.); Beijmo 46'; Karlström 77'	Stadium: Idrottsparken; Attendance: 5,280; Referee: Magnus Lindgren

15 October 2017 27	IK Sirius	2 – 0	Djurgårdens	Uppsala
17:30 CEST (UTC+2)	Maholli (yellow card) 22'; E.Andersson (yellow card) 28'; Nilsson 44'; Vecchia 72'; Thor (yellow card) 90+7'	Report		Stadium: Studenternas IP; Attendance: 6,492; Referee: Stefan Johannesson

22 October 2017 28	Djurgårdens	1 – 1	BK Häcken	Stockholm
17:30 CEST (UTC+2)	Larsson 40'; Walker (yellow card) 42'; Käck (yellow card) 46'; Olsson (yellow card) 82'; Källström (yellow card) 90+3'	Report	Paulinho 36'; Yasin (yellow card) 42'; Ranégie (yellow card) 90'	Stadium: Tele2 Arena; Attendance: 14,181; Referee: Jonas Eriksson

29 October 2017 29	Djurgårdens	0 – 0	Jönköpings Södra IF	Stockholm
17:30 CET (UTC+1)	Walker (yellow card) 56'	Report	Gojani (yellow card) 68'; Cajtoft (yellow card) 87'	Stadium: Tele2 Arena; Attendance: 12,493; Referee: Mohammed Al Hakim

5 November 2017 30	Kalmar	0 – 2	Djurgårdens	Kalmar
15:00 CEST (UTC+2)	Fejzullahu (yellow card) 57'; Romário (yellow card) 60'	Report	Mrabti 29', 41'; Källström (yellow card) 55'; Beijmo (yellow card) 90+3'	Stadium: Guldfågeln Arena; Attendance: 8,241; Referee: Andreas Ekberg

=== 2016–17 Svenska Cupen ===
==== Group stage ====
Pos	Team	Pld	W	D	L	GF	GA	GD	Pts	Qualification
1	IF Brommapojkarna	3	2	1	0	8	2	+6	7	Advance to Knockout stage
2	Degerfors IF	3	2	0	1	6	7	−1	6	
3	Djurgårdens IF	3	1	1	1	3	3	0	4	
4	Helsingborgs IF	3	0	0	3	2	7	−5	0	

Source: Swedish Football Association
Rules for classification: 1) Points; 2) Goal difference; 3) Goals scored; 4) Head-to-head record; 5) Highest ranked team

20 February 2017 1	Djurgårdens IF	1 – 2	Degerfors	Stockholm
19:00 CET (UTC+1)	Larsson (yellow card) 20'; Eriksson (yellow card) 32'; Jawo 62'; Ceesay (yellow card) 80'	Report	Hasani 1', 70'; Wiktorsson (yellow card) 50'; Olsson (yellow card) 55'	Stadium: Tele2 Arena; Attendance: 7,000; Referee: Mohammed Al-Hakim

27 February 2017 2	Brommapojkarna	1 – 1	Djurgårdens IF	Stockholm
19:00 CET (UTC+1)	C.Brandeborn (yellow card) 15'; G.Polo 41' (yellow card) 45'; Magnusson (yellow card) 90+1'	Report	Mrabti 54'; Källström (yellow card) 85'; El Kabir (yellow card) 89'	Stadium: Tele2 Arena; Attendance: 2,531; Referee: Johan Hamlin

4 March 2017 3	Djurgårdens IF	1 – 0	Helsingborg	Stockholm
14:00 CET (UTC+1)	Karlström (yellow card) 17'; Larsson (yellow card) 21'; El Kabir 75' (pen.) (yellow card) 78'	Report	Landgren (yellow card) 5'; Akpoveta (yellow card) 65'; C.Seger (yellow card) 75' (yellow-red card) 90+1'; Achinioti-Jönsson (yellow card) 85'	Stadium: Tele2 Arena; Attendance: 4,024; Referee: Markus Strömbergsson

=== 2017–18 Svenska Cupen ===
23 August 2017 Round 2	Gamla Upsala	1 – 4	Djurgårdens	Uppsala
18:30 CET (UTC+1)	J.Bohlin (yellow card) 6' (yellow-red card); D.Yaldir (yellow card) 29'; H.Englund 37'	Report	Radetinac (yellow card) 18'; Badji 75', 89'; Kristoffersen 83'	Stadium: Lötens IP; Attendance: 1,286; Referee: Victor Wolf

Group stages took place during the 2018 season.

== Squad statistics ==
As of match played 5 November 2017

=== Appearances and goals ===
No.	Pos	Nat	Player	Total		Allsvenskan		2016–17 Svenska Cupen		2017–18 Svenska Cupen	
No.	Pos	Nat	Player	Apps	Goals	Apps	Goals	Apps	Goals	Apps	Goals
1	GK	(Sweden) SWE	Andreas Isaksson	32	0	29	0	3	0	0	0
3	DF	(Sweden) SWE	Elliot Käck	34	0	30	0	3	0	1	0
4	DF	(Sweden) SWE	Jacob Une Larsson	32	1	29	1	2	0	1	0
5	DF	(Norway) NOR	Niklas Gunnarsson	23	0	17+5	0	0	0	1	0
6	MF	(Sweden) SWE	Jesper Karlström	27	3	14+10	3	1+1	0	1	0
7	MF	(Sweden) SWE	Magnus Eriksson	32	14	29	14	3	0	0	0
8	MF	(Sweden) SWE	Kevin Walker	31	2	23+4	2	2+1	0	1	0
9	MF	(Bosnia and Herzegovina) BIH	Haris Radetinac	16	0	1+14	0	0	0	1	0
10	MF	(Sweden) SWE	Kerim Mrabti	28	9	24+1	8	2	1	1	0
11	FW	(Sweden) SWE	Amadou Jawo	4	1	0+1	0	2+1	1	0	0
12	DF	(Sweden) SWE	Jonathan Augustinsson	11	0	0+8	0	1+1	0	1	0
13	DF	(Sweden) SWE	Jonas Olsson	22	3	20+2	3	0	0	0	0
15	DF	(Ivory Coast) CIV	Souleymane Kone	2	0	0	0	1	0	0+1	0
16	MF	(Sweden) SWE	Kim Källström	31	3	28	3	3	0	0	0
17	FW	(Sweden) SWE	Gustav Engvall	25	8	24+1	8	0	0	0	0
19	DF	(Sweden) SWE	Marcus Hansson	9	0	0+6	0	2+1	0	0	0
20	FW	(Senegal) SEN	Aliou Badji	21	5	4+16	3	0	0	0+1	2
21	FW	(Norway) NOR	Julian Kristoffersen	4	1	0+3	0	0	0	1	1
22	DF	(Sweden) SWE	Felix Beijmo	26	2	25+1	2	0	0	0	0
24	FW	(Zimbabwe) ZIM	Tino Kadewere	11	2	4+6	2	0	0	1	0
29	FW	(Nigeria) NGR	Haruna Garba	5	0	0+5	0	0	0	0	0
30	GK	(Sweden) SWE	Tommi Vaiho	4	0	1+2	0	0	0	1	0
58	MF	(Netherlands) NED	Othman El Kabir	33	5	28+1	4	3	1	0+1	0
Players away from Djurgårdens on loan:
2	DF	(Sweden) SWE	Tim Björkström	3	0	0	0	2+1	0	0	0
21	MF	(South Africa) RSA	Mihlali Mayambela	3	0	0	0	1+2	0	0	0
Players who left Djurgårdens during the season:
27	DF	(The Gambia) GAM	Kebba Ceesay	3	0	0	0	2+1	0	0	0

=== Goal scorers ===
Place	Position	Nation	Number	Name	Allsvenskan	2016–17 Svenska Cupen	2017–18 Svenska Cupen	Total
1	MF	(Sweden)	7	Magnus Eriksson	14	0	0	14
2	MF	(Sweden)	10	Kerim Mrabti	8	1	0	9
3	FW	(Sweden)	17	Gustav Engvall	8	0	0	8
4	MF	(Netherlands)	58	Othman El Kabir	4	1	0	5
4	FW	(Senegal)	20	Aliou Badji	3	0	2	5
6	FW	(Sweden)	8	Kevin Walker	3	0	0	3
6	MF	(Sweden)	16	Kim Källström	3	0	0	3
6	DF	(Sweden)	13	Jonas Olsson	3	0	0	3
6	MF	(Sweden)	6	Jesper Karlström	3	0	0	3
10	FW	(Zimbabwe)	24	Tino Kadewere	2	0	0	2
10	DF	(Sweden)	22	Felix Beijmo	2	0	0	2
12	DF	(Sweden)	4	Jacob Une Larsson	1	0	0	1
12	FW	(Sweden)	11	Amadou Jawo	0	1	0	1
12	FW	(Norway)	21	Julian Kristoffersen	0	0	1	1
12				Own goal	1	0	0	1
				TOTALS	54	3	3	60

=== Disciplinary record ===
Number	Nation	Position	Name	Allsvenskan		2016–17 Svenska Cupen		2017–18 Svenska Cupen		Total	
Number	Nation	Position	Name	Yellow card	Red card	Yellow card	Red card	Yellow card	Red card	Yellow card	Red card
1	(Sweden)	GK	Andreas Isaksson	2	0	0	0	0	0	2	0
3	(Sweden)	DF	Elliot Käck	2	0	0	0	0	0	2	0
4	(Sweden)	DF	Jacob Une Larsson	4	0	2	0	0	0	6	0
5	(Norway)	DF	Niklas Gunnarsson	1	0	0	0	0	0	1	0
6	(Sweden)	MF	Jesper Karlström	2	0	1	0	0	0	3	0
7	(Sweden)	MF	Magnus Eriksson	4	0	1	0	0	0	5	0
8	(Sweden)	MF	Kevin Walker	5	0	0	0	0	0	5	0
10	(Sweden)	MF	Kerim Mrabti	3	0	0	0	1	0	4	0
13	(Sweden)	DF	Jonas Olsson	6	0	0	0	0	0	6	0
16	(Sweden)	MF	Kim Källström	7	0	1	0	0	0	8	0
17	(Sweden)	FW	Gustav Engvall	1	0	0	0	0	0	1	0
22	(Sweden)	DF	Felix Beijmo	3	0	0	0	0	0	3	0
24	(Zimbabwe)	FW	Tino Kadewere	1	0	0	0	0	0	1	0
27	(The Gambia)	DF	Kebba Ceesay	0	0	1	0	0	0	1	0
29	(Nigeria)	FW	Haruna Garba	1	0	0	0	0	0	1	0
58	(Netherlands)	MF	Othman El Kabir	5	0	2	0	0	0	7	0
			TOTALS	47	0	8	0	1	0	56	0
