= 2014 IF Brommapojkarna season =

IF Brommapojkarna
2014 season
- Chairman: Patrik Emanuelsson
- Manager: Stefan Billborn
- Stadium: Grimsta IP
- Allsvenskan: 16th
- Top goalscorer: League: Gabriel Petrović, Dardan Rexhepi (5); All: Dardan Rexhepi (7)
- Highest home attendance: 2,065 (14 April 2014 vs IFK Göteborg, Allsvenskan)
- Lowest home attendance: 524 (17 July 2014 vs Crusaders F.C., UEFA Europa League)
- Average home league attendance: 1,581 (in Allsvenskan); 1,395 (in all competitions)
Home colours	Away colours

The 2014 season will be Brommapojkarna's 72nd in existence, their 5th season in Allsvenskan and their 2nd consecutive season in the league. The team will be competing in Allsvenskan and UEFA Europa League.

== Current squad ==
=== 2014 squad ===
As of 29 July 2014 Note: Flags indicate national team as defined under FIFA eligibility rules; some limited exceptions apply. Players may hold more than one non-FIFA nationality.

No.	Pos.	Nation	Player
1	GK	SWE	Davor Blažević
2	DF	SWE	Pontus Segerström (captain)
4	MF	SWE	Mauricio Albornoz
5	DF	ISL	Kristinn Jónsson (on loan from Breiðablik)
6	MF	SWE	Jesper Karlström
7	MF	SWE	Gabriel Petrović (vice captain)
8	MF	SWE	Serge-Junior Martinsson Ngouali
9	FW	KOS	Dardan Rexhepi
10	FW	SWE	Gabriel Özkan
11	FW	SWE	Filip Tronêt
12	FW	SWE	Christian Kouakou
13	DF	SWE	Tim Björkström

No.	Pos.	Nation	Player
14	FW	SWE	Nicklas Bärkroth
15	DF	SWE	Carl Starfelt
16	FW	SWE	Pontus Åsbrink
17	MF	SWE	Gustav Sandberg Magnusson
18	DF	SWE	Jacob Une Larsson
19	FW	SWE	Stefano Vecchia Holmquist
21	FW	SWE	Andreas Eriksson
22	DF	SWE	Martin Falkeborn
23	FW	SWE	Victor Söderström
24	MF	SWE	Seth Hellberg
30	GK	SWE	Ivo Vazgeč
—	DF	SWE	Fredric Jonson

== Competitions ==
=== Allsvenskan ===
==== League table ====
Pos	Team	Pld	W	D	L	GF	GA	GD	Pts	Qualification or relegation
12	IFK Norrköping	30	9	9	12	39	50	−11	36	
13	Falkenbergs FF	30	9	6	15	37	49	−12	33	
14	Gefle IF (O)	30	8	8	14	34	42	−8	32	Qualification to Relegation play-offs
15	Mjällby AIF (R)	30	8	5	17	29	47	−18	29	Relegation to Superettan
16	IF Brommapojkarna (R)	30	2	6	22	28	69	−41	12	Relegation to Superettan

Source: svenskfotboll.se (in Swedish)
Rules for classification: 1) points; 2) goal difference; 3) number of goals scored; 4) head-to-head points; 5) head-to-head goal difference; 6) head-to-head away goals scored
(O) Play-off winners; (R) Relegated

=== Svenska Cupen ===
Pos	Team	Pld	W	D	L	GF	GA	GD	Pts	Qualification	BP	ÅFF	JSIF	CU
1	IF Brommapojkarna	3	2	1	0	5	0	+5	7	Advance to Knockout stage	—	—	0–0	—
2	Åtvidabergs FF	3	1	1	1	6	3	+3	4		0–1	—	4–0	—
3	Jönköpings Södra IF	3	1	1	1	4	4	0	4		—	—	—	4–0
4	Carlstad United	3	0	1	2	2	10	−8	1		0–4	2–2	—	—

=== UEFA Europa League ===
First round

3 July 2014 1st round: 1st leg	VPS (Finland)	2–1	(Sweden) Brommapojkarna	Tehtaan kenttä, Valkeakoski
18:00	Strandvall 53'; Parikka 54'	Report	Kouakou 33'	Attendance: 1,025; Referee: Tore Hansen (Norway)

10 July 2014 1st round: 2nd leg	Brommapojkarna (Sweden)	2–0	(Finland) VPS	Tele2 Arena, Stockholm
19:00	Larsson 64'; Petrović 78'	Report		Attendance: 777; Referee: Sergey Lapochkin (Russia)

Brommapojkarna won 3–2 on aggregate.

Second round

17 July 2014 2nd round: 1st leg	Brommapojkarna (Sweden)	4–0	(Northern Ireland) Crusaders	Tele2 Arena, Stockholm
19:00	Rexhepi 9'; Albornoz 27'; Larsson 62'; Bärkroth 65' (pen.)	Report		Attendance: 524; Referee: Christos Nicolaides (Cyprus)

24 July 2014 2nd round: 2nd leg	Crusaders (Northern Ireland)	1–1	(Sweden) Brommapojkarna	Seaview, Belfast
20:45	Coates 17'	Report	Rexhepi 27'	Attendance: 798; Referee: Alain Bieri (Switzerland)

Brommapojkarna won 5–1 on aggregate.

Third round

31 July 2014 3rd round: 1st leg	Brommapojkarna (Sweden)	0–3	(Italy) Torino	Tele2 Arena, Stockholm
19:00		Report	Larrondo 45' (pen.), 53'; Barreto 58'	Attendance: 2,043; Referee: Serdar Gözübüyük (Netherlands)

7 August 2014 3rd round: 2nd leg	Torino (Italy)	4–0	(Sweden) Brommapojkarna	Stadio Olimpico, Turin
20:30	Jónsson 4' (o.g.); Darmian 37'; Quagliarella 80' (pen.); Martínez 90'	Report		Attendance: 22,931; Referee: Paweł Raczkowski (Poland)

Torino won 7–0 on aggregate.
