= Granat (disambiguation) =

Granat was a Soviet space observatory. Granat may also refer to

- Granat (surname)
- Cape Granat in Antarctica
- Granat Encyclopedic Dictionary, a Russian encyclopedic dictionary
- ZKS Granat Skarżysko, a Polish football club
