= Lake Glubokoye (Antarctica) =

Lake in Antarctica

Glubokoye Lake
- Location within Antarctica
- Location: Thala Hills, Enderby Land, Antarctica
- Coordinates: 67°40′S 45°52′E
- Basin countries: (Antarctica)

Glubokoye Lake is a small lake situated just east of Lake Lagernoye and Molodyozhnaya Station in the Thala Hills of Enderby Land, Antarctica. It was mapped and named "Glubokoye ozero" (Russian: Глубокое озеро; deep lake) by the Soviet Antarctic Expedition, 1961–62.
