= Domashnyaya Bank =

Shoal in Enderby Land, Antarctica

Coordinates: 67°39′S 45°50′E

Domashnyaya Bank () is a shoal, covered by only 0.6 metres (2 ft) of water, near Molodezhnaya Station in Enderby Land. It lies close to shore, about 0.5 nautical miles (1 km) southwest of Cape Granat. It was first charted by the Soviet Antarctic Expedition, 1961–62, which called it "Banka Domashnyaya" (domestic bank), presumably for the nearness of the feature to their station.
