= Lake Lagernoye =

Lake in Antarctica

- Location within Antarctica
- Location: Enderby Land, Antarctica
- Coordinates: 67°40′S 45°51′E
- Basin countries: (Antarctica)

Lake Lagernoye is a small lake in Antarctica, situated just south of the camp at Molodyozhnaya Station and immediately west of Lake Glubokoye, in the Thala Hills, Enderby Land. It was mapped and named Ozero Lagernoye (Russian for "camp lake") by the Soviet Antarctic Expedition of 1961–62.
