= Åsbrink =

Åsbrink is a Swedish surname. Notable people with the surname include:

- Elisabeth Åsbrink (born 1965), Swedish author and journalist
- Erik Åsbrink (born 1947), Swedish politician
- Gösta Åsbrink (1881–1966), Swedish gymnast and modern pentathlete
- Pontus Åsbrink (born 1992), Swedish football player
