= Jesper Karlström =

Swedish footballer (born 1995)

- Karlström with Sweden in 2026

Personal information
- Full name: Jesper Kewe Karlström
- Date of birth: 21 June 1995 (age 31)
- Place of birth: Stockholm, Sweden
- Height: 1.82 m (6 ft 0 in)
- Position: Midfielder

Team information
- Current team: Udinese
- Number: 8

Youth career
- 2001–2004: Hammarby IF
- 2004–2012: IF Brommapojkarna

Senior career*
Years	Team	Apps	(Gls)
2012–2014	IF Brommapojkarna	41	(3)
2015–2020	Djurgårdens IF	147	(8)
2017	→ IF Brommapojkarna (loan)	2	(1)
2021–2024	Lech Poznań	111	(4)
2024–	Udinese	84	(2)

International career^{‡}
2012	Sweden U17	9	(3)
2013–2014	Sweden U19	15	(0)
2014–2015	Sweden U21	5	(1)
2018–	Sweden	32	(0)
- * Club domestic league appearances and goals as of 15:17, 9 November 2026 (UTC) ‡ National team caps and goals as of 23:50, 17 November 2026 (UTC)

Jesper Kewe Karlström (born 21 June 1995) is a Swedish professional footballer who plays as a midfielder for Serie A club Udinese, which he captains, and the Sweden national team.

== Club career ==
=== Early career ===
Karlström started out his career playing for Hammarby IF at the age of six. When he turned nine the coach of his team moved to IF Brommapojkarna and brought his entire youth team along with him to the new club, including Karlström.

=== IF Brommapojkarna ===
Shortly after his eighteenth birthday in 2013, Karlström made his Allsvenskan debut for Brommapojkarna away against Kalmar FF. At the start of the next year he scored for the first time when his game-winning goal in the last game of the 2013–14 Svenska Cupen group stage qualified the club for the knockout stage of the tournament. A few months later he also scored his first league goal in the 3–0 home win against IFK Norrköping.

=== Djurgårdens IF ===
Brommapojkarna were relegated at the end of the 2014 Allsvenskan season, but Karlström had performed well enough to be signed by the larger Stockholm club Djurgårdens IF on a four-year deal. Ahead of 2017 Karlström had his shirt number changed from 22 to 6. On 10 May 2018, he played as Djurgarden beat Malmö FF 3–0 in the 2018 Svenska Cupen final.

In 2019 Karlström crowned himself as a Swedish champion as part of the Djurgårdens IF team that won the Swedish league for a twelfth time. Karlström contributed with the 2–1 goal in the remarkable second-half comeback to win the title.

=== Lech Poznań ===
On 2 December 2020, Lech Poznań announced Karlström had signed from Djurgårdens IF on a contract until June 2024. In three-and-a-half-years, he totaled 144 appearances, four goals and nine assists across all competitions for Lech, won the 2021–22 Ekstraklasa title and contributed to the club's best-ever European campaign in 2022–23, when they reached the UEFA Europa Conference League quarter-finals.

=== Udinese ===
On 3 August 2024, Karlström moved to Italian club Udinese on a two-year deal, for a reported fee of €2 million with potential bonuses. He was named Udinese's captain ahead of the 2025–26 season.

== International career ==
Karlström has represented Sweden at the U17, U19 and U21 levels. In November 2014 he made his debut for the Sweden national under-21 football team against Austria.

He made his full international debut for the Sweden national team on 11 January 2018 in a friendly 1–0 win against Denmark, playing for 66 minutes before being replaced by Kristoffer Olsson.

On 12 May 2026, Karlström was named in the Sweden squad for the 2026 FIFA World Cup.

== Career statistics ==
=== Club ===
As of match played 6 November 2026

Appearances and goals by club, season and competition
Club	Season	League			National cup (Note: Includes Svenska Cupen, Polish Cup, Coppa Italia)		Continental		Other		Total	
Club	Season	Division	Apps	Goals	Apps	Goals	Apps	Goals	Apps	Goals	Apps	Goals
IF Brommapojkarna	2013	Allsvenskan	14	0	5	1	—		—		19	1
IF Brommapojkarna	2014	Allsvenskan	27	3	1	0	6 (Note: Appearance(s) in UEFA Europa League)	0	—		34	3
IF Brommapojkarna	Total		41	3	6	1	6	0	—		53	4
Djurgårdens IF	2015	Allsvenskan	26	1	2	1	—		—		28	2
Djurgårdens IF	2016	Allsvenskan	16	1	4	1	—		—		20	2
Djurgårdens IF	2017	Allsvenskan	24	3	3	1	—		—		27	4
Djurgårdens IF	2018	Allsvenskan	25	0	7	0	2	0	—		34	0
Djurgårdens IF	2019	Allsvenskan	28	2	6	2	—		—		34	4
Djurgårdens IF	2020	Allsvenskan	28	1	4	1	3 (Note: One appearance in UEFA Champions League, two appearances in UEFA Europa League)	0	—		35	2
Djurgårdens IF	Total		147	8	26	6	5	0	—		178	14
IF Brommapojkarna (loan)	2017	Superettan	2	1	—		—		—		2	1
Lech Poznań	2020–21	Ekstraklasa	16	0	2	0	—		—		18	0
Lech Poznań	2021–22	Ekstraklasa	32	1	4	0	—		—		36	1
Lech Poznań	2022–23	Ekstraklasa	31	1	1	0	19 (Note: Two appearances in UEFA Champions League, seventeen appearances in UEFA Europa Conference League)	0	1 (Note: Appearance in Polish Super Cup)	0	52	1
Lech Poznań	2023–24	Ekstraklasa	30	2	2	0	4 (Note: Appearance(s) in UEFA Europa Conference League)	0	—		36	2
Lech Poznań	2024–25	Ekstraklasa	2	0	—		—		—		2	0
Lech Poznań	Total		111	4	9	0	23	0	1	0	144	4
Udinese	2024–25	Serie A	37	0	2	0	—		—		39	0
Udinese	2025–26	Serie A	36	1	2	0	—		—		38	1
Udinese	2026–27	Serie A	11	1	2	0	—		—		13	1
Udinese	Total		84	2	6	0	—		—		90	2
Career total			385	18	47	7	34	0	1	0	467	25

=== International ===
As of match played 17 November 2026

Appearances and goals by national team and year
National team	Year	Apps	Goals
Sweden	2018	1	0
Sweden	2019	0	0
Sweden	2020	0	0
Sweden	2021	0	0
Sweden	2022	9	0
Sweden	2023	3	0
Sweden	2024	3	0
Sweden	2025	5	0
Sweden	2026	11	0
Total		32	0

== Honours ==
Djurgårdens IF

- Allsvenskan: 2019
- Svenska Cupen: 2017–18

Lech Poznań

- Ekstraklasa: 2021–22
