= Mihlali Mayambela =

South African soccer player

Personal information
- Full name: Mihlali Samson Mabhuti Mayambela
- Date of birth: 25 August 1996 (age 30)
- Place of birth: Khayelitsha, Cape Town, South Africa
- Height: 1.86 m (6 ft 1 in)
- Positions: Midfielder; winger

Team information
- Current team: Omonia
- Number: 21

Youth career
- Old Mutual Academy
- Orlando Pirates
- Kaizer Chiefs

Senior career*
Years	Team	Apps	(Gls)
2014–2015	Cape Town All Stars	11	(0)
2016–2019	Djurgården	8	(0)
2017	→ Degerfors (loan)	29	(7)
2018	→ Brage (loan)	10	(2)
2018–2019	→ Farense (loan)	32	(4)
2019–2022	Farense	74	(10)
2020	→ Bnei Yehuda (loan)	7	(1)
2021	→ Académica (loan)	16	(3)
2022–2026	Aris Limassol	102	(16)
2026–	Omonia	6	(0)

International career
2022–2024	South Africa	16	(2)
- * Club domestic league appearances and goals as of 14 June 2026

Mihlali Samson "Mabhuti" Mayambela (born 25 August 1996) is a South African professional soccer player who plays as a midfielder for Omonia.

== Career ==
Mayambela started out his youth career with Old Mutual Academy before also spending time at the two Johannesburg clubs Orlando Pirates and Kaizer Chiefs In 2014 and 2015 he played first team football with South African National First Division side Cape Town All Stars where he made 11 league appearances.

After trialing with the club for two weeks during the summer of 2015 Mayambela joined Swedish Allsvenskan side Djurgårdens IF on a four-year deal in January 2016. They had originally intended to sign him during the upcoming summer but due to injuries they decided to make the move six months earlier. On 28 March 2016, it was reported that the Welsh club Swansea City was tracking Mayambela. On 24 August Mayambela scored his first goal for Djurgården, scoring one goal in the Swedish Cup qualifier 5–1 win against Smedby AIS.

In 2017, Mayambela moved on loan to Swedish second tier Superettan club Degerfors IF. Mayambela was loaned out once again in 2018, this time to newly promoted IK Brage in the same division.

On 19 July 2018, Mayambela was loaned out to Farense until the summer of 2019, with an option to buy.

On 28 January 2020, he moved on loan to Israeli Premier League club Bnei Yehuda

In the year of 2022, he was transferred to Cypriot club Aris Limassol on a two-year deal.

== Personal life ==
He is the younger brother of Mark Mayambela. His favourite football club is Kaizer Chiefs.

== Career statistics ==
=== Club ===
As of match played 1 March 2025

Appearances and goals by club, season and competition
Club	Season	League			National cup (Note: Includes Svenska Cupen, Taça de Portugal, Cypriot Cup)		League cup (Note: Includes Taça da Liga)		Continental		Other		Total	
Club	Season	Division	Apps	Goals	Apps	Goals	Apps	Goals	Apps	Goals	Apps	Goals	Apps	Goals
Djurgården	2016	Allsvenskan	8	0	1	0	—		—		—		9	0
Djurgården	2017	Allsvenskan	0	0	4	1	—		—		—		4	1
Djurgården	Total		8	0	5	1	—		—		—		13	1
Degerfors (loan)	2017	Superettan	29	7	0	0	—		—		—		29	7
Degerfors (loan)	2018	Superettan	0	0	1	0	—		—		—		1	0
Degerfors (loan)	Total		29	7	1	0	—		—		—		30	7
Brage (loan)	2018	Superettan	10	2	0	0	—		—		—		10	2
Farense (loan)	2018–19	Liga Portugal 2	32	4	1	0	0	0	—		—		33	4
Farense	2019–20	Liga Portugal 2	14	2	1	0	1	0	—		—		16	2
Farense	2021–22	Liga Portugal 2	28	4	2	0	2	0	—		—		32	4
Farense	Total		42	6	3	0	3	0	—		—		48	6
Bnei Yehuda (loan)	2019–20	Israeli Premier League	7	1	0	0	0	0	—		—		7	1
Académica (loan)	2021–22	Liga Portugal 2	16	3	0	0	0	0	—		—		16	3
Aris Limassol	2022–23	Cypriot First Division	30	4	1	0	—		2 (Note: Appearances in UEFA Europa Conference League)	0	—		33	4
Aris Limassol	2023–24	Cypriot First Division	24	3	2	0	—		12 (Note: Four appearances and one goal in UEFA Champions League, eight appearances and two goals in UEFA Europa League)	3	1 (Note: Appearance in Cypriot Super Cup)	1	39	7
Aris Limassol	2024–25	Cypriot First Division	22	4	0	0	—		—		—		22	4
Aris Limassol	Total		76	11	3	0	—		14	3	1	1	94	15
Career total			220	34	13	1	3	0	14	3	1	1	251	39

=== International ===
Appearances and goals by national team and year
National team	Year	Apps	Goals
South Africa	2022	2	1
South Africa	2023	8	1
South Africa	2024	6	0
Total		16	2

Scores and results list South Africa's goal tally first, score column indicates score after each Mayambela goal.

List of international goals scored by Mihlali Mayambela
No.	Date	Venue	Opponent	Score	Result	Competition
1	24 September 2022	FNB Stadium, Johannesburg, South Africa	Sierra Leone	2–0	4–0	Friendly
2	28 March 2023	Samuel Kanyon Doe Sports Complex, Monrovia, Liberia	Liberia	2–1	2–1	2023 Africa Cup of Nations qualification

== Honours ==
Aris Limassol

- Cypriot First Division: 2022–23
- Cypriot Super Cup: 2023

Omonia

- Cypriot First Division: 2025–26

South Africa

- Africa Cup of Nations third place: 2023
