= Cape Granat =

Headland in Antarctica

Cape Granat (67°39′S 45°51′E) is a cape in the western part of the Thala Hills, 7 nautical miles (13 km) northeast of Campbell Glacier, on the coast of Enderby Land, Antarctica. Molodezhnaya Station is just south of the cape. This feature was mapped and called "Mys Granat" (Cape Garnet) by the Soviet Antarctic Expedition, 1961–62.
