= Granat (surname) =

Granat is the surname of the following people

- Amy Granat (born 1976), American artist
- Adrian Granat (born 1991), Swedish boxer
- Balázs Granát (born 1985), Hungarian football player
- Cary Granat, American entertainer and film producer
- Endre Granat (born 1937), American violinist
- Erik Granat (born 1995), Swedish football player
- Jiří Granát (born 1955), Czech tennis player
- Vladimir Granat (born 1987), Russian football player
- Peter Granat (born 1954, murdered 2010), South African businessman. CEO Autozone, MD Supergroup
