= Besard Šabović =

Swedish footballer (born 1998)

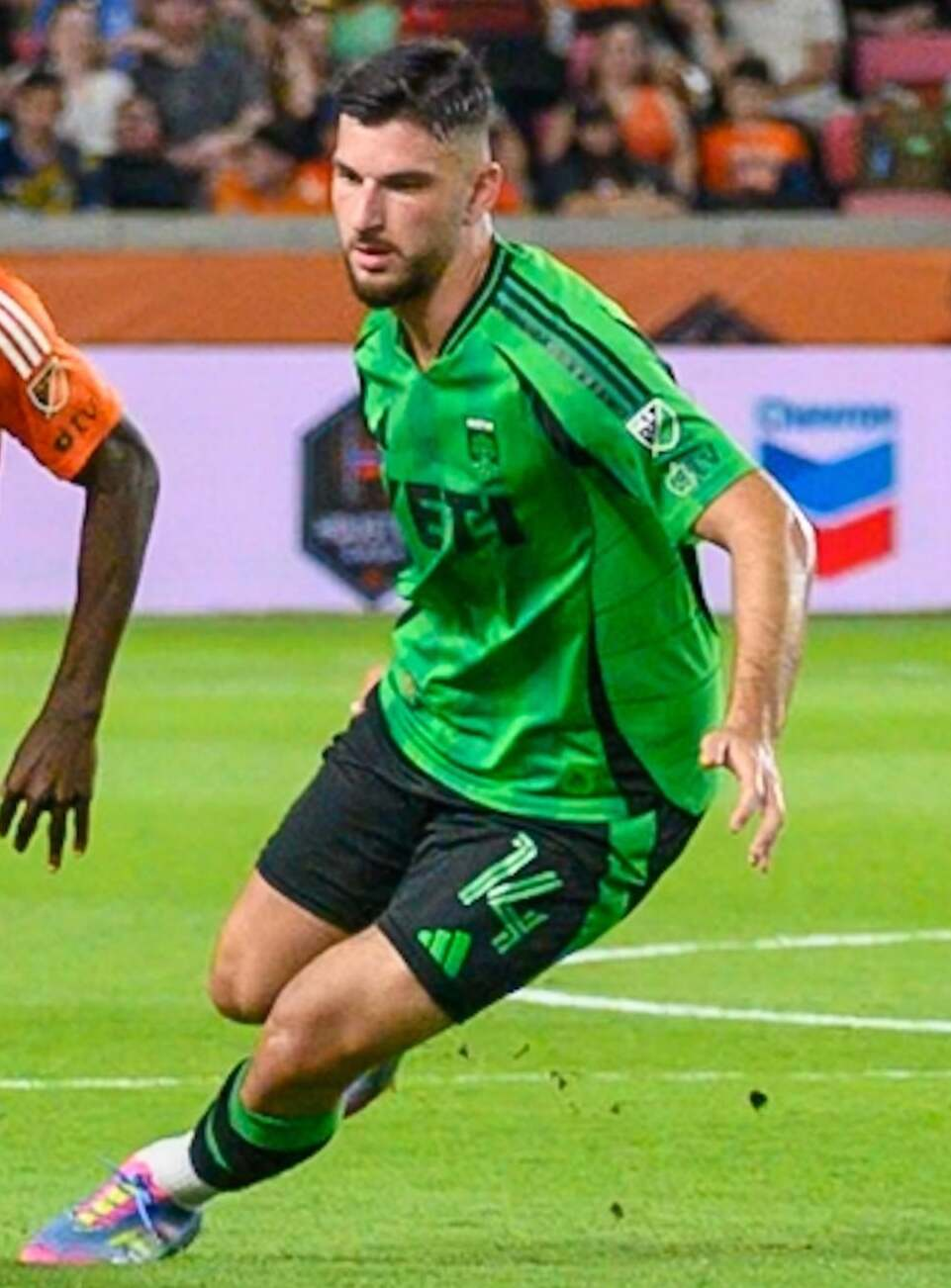
- Šabović with Austin FC in 2025

Personal information
- Date of birth: 5 January 1998 (age 28)
- Place of birth: Stockholm, Sweden
- Height: 1.86 m (6 ft 1 in)
- Position: Midfielder

Team information
- Current team: Austin FC
- Number: 14

Youth career
- 2003–2015: Brommapojkarna
- 2015–2016: Djurgårdens IF

Senior career*
Years	Team	Apps	(Gls)
2016–2019	Djurgårdens IF	10	(1)
2017	→ Brommapojkarna (loan)	7	(0)
2019	→ Dalkurd (loan)	27	(5)
2020	Mjällby	27	(4)
2021	Kayserispor	11	(0)
2021–2022	Khimki	21	(1)
2022–2024	Djurgårdens IF	64	(5)
2025–	Austin FC	61	(1)

International career^{‡}
2013–2014	Sweden U17	9	(0)
2015–2017	Sweden U19	15	(0)
2019	North Macedonia U21	3	(0)
2020	Sweden U21	2	(0)
- * Club domestic league appearances and goals as of 21:26, 8 November 2026 (UTC) ‡ National team caps and goals as of 13 October 2020

Besard Šabović (Macedonian: Бесард Шабовиќ, Albanian: Besard Shaboviq or Besard Ferri; born 5 January 1998) is a Swedish professional footballer who currently plays for Austin FC as a centre midfielder. He has represented both Sweden and North Macedonia at youth international level.

== Club career ==
=== Early career ===
Šabović started out playing for Brommapojkarna at age five. He took part in the TV4-show called Fotbollsfabriken (The Football Factory), which plotted the best 15-years old players in the Brommapojkarna's academy.

=== Djurgårdens IF ===
On 18 February 2015, Šabović joined with Djurgårdens IF, on a three-year under-21 contract. On 12 January 2016, Šabović was promoted to the first team and signed a four-year contract. On 24 April 2016, he made his debut in a 1–0 away defeat against Malmö after coming on as a substitute at 77th minute in place of Alexander Faltsetas.

==== Loan to Brommapojkarna ====
On 24 March 2017, Šabović returned to Superettan side Brommapojkarna, on a season-long loan. On 1 April 2017, he made his debut in a 0–0 away draw against Dalkurd after coming on as a substitute at 89th minute in place of Markus Gustafsson.

==== Loan to Dalkurd ====
On 29 March 2019, Šabović joined Superettan side Dalkurd, on a season-long loan with the opportunity to playing for Djurgården during the loan spell also. On 7 April 2019, he made his debut in a 0–4 home defeat against the former club Brommapojkarna after being named in the starting line-up.

On 1 July 2019, Šabović was called up for a game for Djurgården against Kalmar FF, where he was subbed in for the last few minutes.

=== Khimki ===
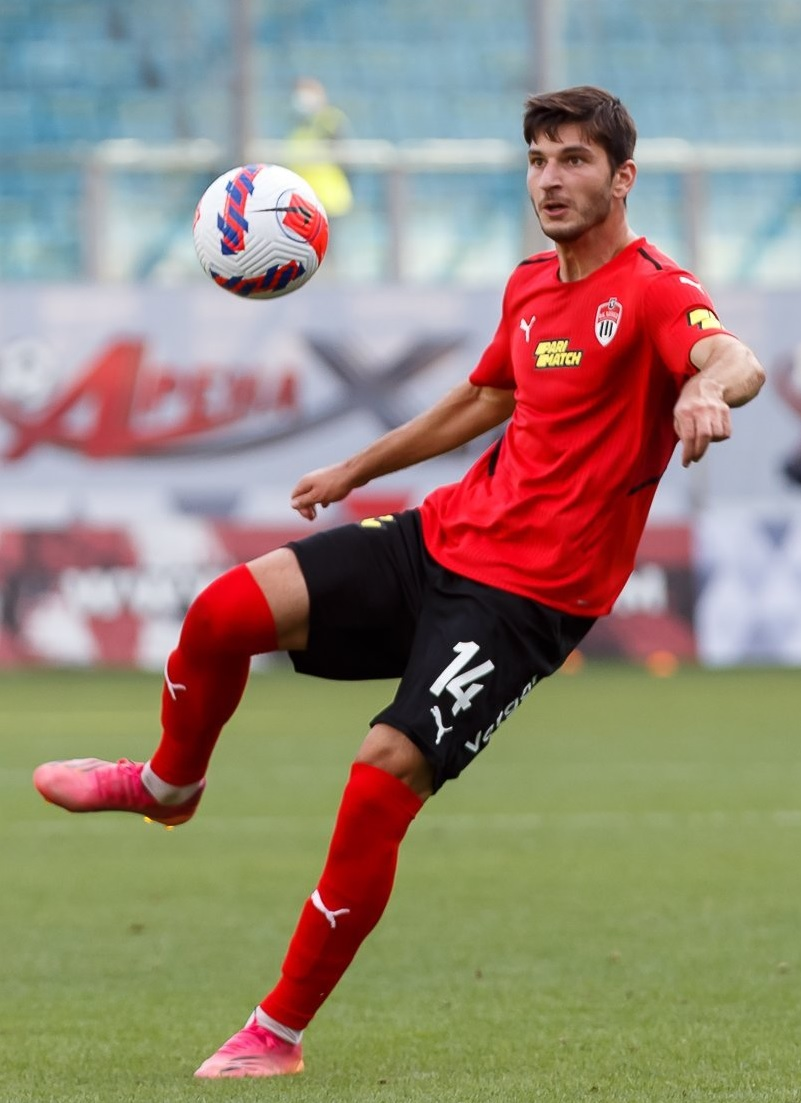
Šabović with FC Khimki in 2021.

On 22 June 2021, he signed with Russian Premier League club FC Khimki. Šabović left Khimki on 3 June 2022.

=== Return to Djurgårdens IF ===
On 10 August 2022, Šabović signed a 2.5-year contract with Djurgårdens IF.

=== Austin FC ===
On 21 January 2025, Šabović signed with Major League Soccer side Austin FC on a three-year deal.

== International career ==
=== North Macedonia ===
==== Under-21 ====
On 14 March 2019, Šabović was named as part of the North Macedonia U21 squad for 2019 Antalya Cup. On 22 March 2019, he made his debut with North Macedonia U21 in a match against Ukraine U21 after coming on as a substitute at 62nd minute in place of Jani Atanasov.

== Personal life ==
Šabović was born in Stockholm, Sweden as the son of a Montenegrin Albanian father from Plav and an Albanian mother from Medveđa. He is the great-grandson of the member of the Albanian nationalist organization League of Prizren, Jakup Ferri.

== Career statistics ==
=== Club ===
As of match played 7 November 2026

Appearances and goals by club, season and competition
Club	Season	League			League Cup		National Cup (Note: Includes appearances in Svenska Cupen, Russian Cup)		Continental (Note: Includes appearances in UEFA Conference League)		Other		Total	
Club	Season	Division	Apps	Goals	Apps	Goals	Apps	Goals	Apps	Goals	Apps	Goals	Apps	Goals
Djurgården	2015	Allsvenskan	0	0	—		0	0	—		—		0	0
Djurgården	2016	Allsvenskan	7	1	—		1	0	—		—		8	1
Djurgården	2018	Allsvenskan	2	0	—		1	0	0	0	—		3	0
Djurgården	2019	Allsvenskan	1	0	—		2	0	—		—		3	0
Djurgården	Total		10	1	—		4	0	0	0	—		14	1
Brommapojkarna (loan)	2017	Superettan	7	0	—		0	0	—		—		7	0
Dalkurd (loan)	2019	Superettan	27	5	—		0	0	—		—		27	5
Mjällby	2020	Allsvenskan	27	4	—		5	0	—		—		32	4
Kayserispor	2020–21	Süper Lig	11	0	—		—		—		—		11	0
Khimki	2021–22	Russian Premier League	21	1	—		2	0	—		—		23	1
Djurgården	2022	Allsvenskan	12	1	—		1	1	7	0	—		20	2
Djurgården	2023	Allsvenskan	25	1	—		6	1	2	0	—		33	2
Djurgården	2024	Allsvenskan	27	3	—		5	2	12	1	—		44	6
Djurgården	Total		64	5	—		12	4	21	1	—		97	10
Austin FC	2025	Major League Soccer	32	1	2 (Note: Appearance in MLS Cup playoffs)	0	4	0	—		—		37	1
Austin FC	2026	Major League Soccer	29	0	0	0	1	0	—		4 (Note: Includes appearances in Leagues Cup)	0	33	0
Austin FC	Total		61	1	2	0	5	0	0	0	4	0	69	1
Career total			228	17	2	0	28	4	21	1	4	0	281	22

== Honours ==
Djurgården

- Allsvenskan: 2019
