= Haruna Garba =

Nigerian footballer

Personal information
- Full name: Haruna Zambuk Garba
- Date of birth: 17 January 1994 (age 32)
- Place of birth: Nigeria
- Height: 1.90 m (6 ft 3 in)
- Position: Striker

Senior career*
Years	Team	Apps	(Gls)
2014–2015	Kruoja Pakruojis	3	(0)
2015	Sliema Wanderers	10	(1)
2015–2016	Hamrun Spartans	25	(22)
2016–2017	Dubai	1	(0)
2017–2018	Djurgården	5	(0)
2018	→ Gżira United (loan)	12	(5)
2018–2019	Gżira United	22	(13)
2018	→ Al-Hilal (loan)	10	(1)
2019–2020	Debrecen	28	(10)
2020	Suzhou Dongwu	2	(0)
2021	Voluntari	4	(0)
- * Club domestic league appearances and goals as of 07:08, 15 June 2021 (UTC)

Haruna Garba (born 17 January 1994) is a Nigerian footballer who plays as a striker.

== Career ==
After joining Gżira United on loan from Djurgårdens IF in January 2018, Gzira made the deal permanent in May 2018. He then joined Sudanese club Al-Hilal on loan. In June 2019 he moved to Nemzeti Bajnokság I, joining Debrecen.
