= Gustav Engvall =

Swedish footballer

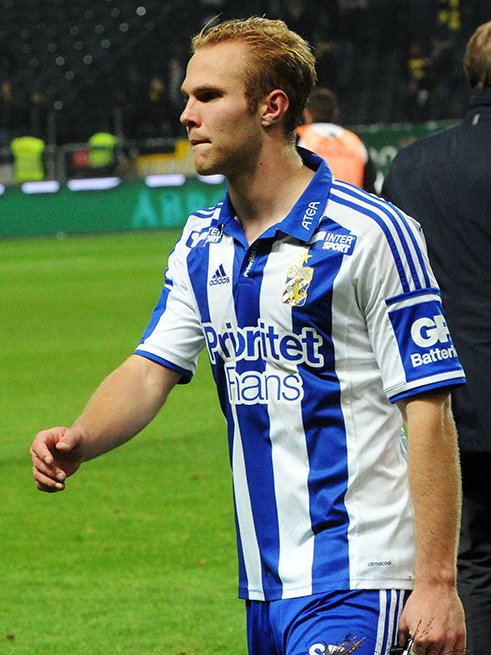
- Engvall with IFK Göteborg in 2015.

Personal information
- Full name: Gustav Per Fredrik Engvall
- Date of birth: 29 April 1996 (age 30)
- Place of birth: Kalmar, Sweden
- Height: 1.84 m (6 ft 0 in)
- Position: Forward

Team information
- Current team: KuPS
- Number: 9

Youth career
- –2010: Färjestadens GoIF
- 2012–2013: IFK Göteborg

Senior career*
Years	Team	Apps	(Gls)
2011–2012	Färjestadens GoIF	28	(1)
2013–2016	IFK Göteborg	64	(16)
2016–2018	Bristol City	4	(0)
2017	→ Djurgårdens IF (loan)	13	(7)
2017	→ Djurgårdens IF (loan)	12	(1)
2018	→ IFK Göteborg (loan)	10	(1)
2018–2023	Mechelen	76	(12)
2022	→ Sarpsborg 08 (loan)	13	(1)
2023–2025	IFK Värnamo	52	(14)
2025–2026	Miedź Legnica	24	(0)
2025	Miedź Legnica II	1	(0)
2026–	KuPS	25	(3)

International career
2011–2013	Sweden U17	26	(9)
2013–2014	Sweden U19	7	(1)
2014–2018	Sweden U21	21	(4)
2016	Sweden	2	(0)
Medal record
Men's football
Representing Sweden
FIFA U-17 World Cup
Third place	2013 United Arab Emirates
- * Club domestic league appearances and goals as of 12 November 2026

Gustav Per Fredrik Engvall (born 29 April 1996) is a Swedish professional footballer who plays as a forward for Veikkausliiga club KuPS.

== Career ==
Starting his career with Färjestadens GoIF, Engvall subsequently played for IFK Göteborg in the Allsvenskan.

In 2016, he signed for EFL Championship side Bristol City, and made his debut in a 2–1 win over Fulham in the EFL Cup on 21 September.

Engvall was loaned out to Djurgården in 2017 for an initial six month period, later extended until the end of the 2017 season.

He returned to IFK Göteborg on loan in March 2018.

On 29 June 2018, Engvall joined Mechelen on a two-year contract.

On 10 August 2022, Engvall moved on loan to Sarpsborg 08 in Norway until the end of 2022.

On 30 December 2024, he signed a two-and-a-half-year deal with Polish second-tier club Miedź Legnica with an option for a further year.

On 3 February 2026, Engvall moved to Finnish side KuPS on a one-year contract.

== Career statistics ==
=== International ===
Appearances and goals by national team and year
National team	Year	Apps	Goals
Sweden	2016	2	0
Total		2	0

== Honours ==
IFK Göteborg

- Svenska Cupen: 2014–15

Mechelen

- Belgian Cup: 2018–19

Sweden U17

- FIFA U-17 World Cup third place: 2013

Individual

- Allsvenskan Newcomer of the year: 2014
