= Christoffer Carlsson =

Swedish footballer

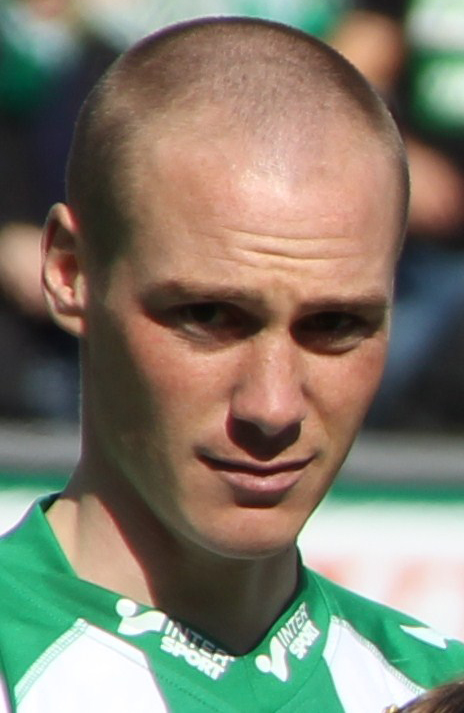

Personal information
- Full name: Fredrik Christoffer Carlsson
- Date of birth: 15 January 1989 (age 37)
- Place of birth: Falkenberg, Sweden
- Height: 1.72 m (5 ft 8 in)
- Position: Midfielder

Youth career
- Stafsinge IF
- Landskrona BoIS

Senior career*
Years	Team	Apps	(Gls)
2006–2009	Landskrona BoIS	59	(4)
2010–2012	Falkenbergs FF	86	(5)
2013	Hammarby IF	24	(0)
2014–2025	Falkenbergs FF	296	(20)
Total		465	(29)

International career
2004–2005	Sweden U17	11	(3)
2006–2008	Sweden U19	8	(1)
- * Club domestic league appearances and goals

Christoffer Carlsson (born 15 January 1989) is a Swedish former footballer who played as a midfielder.

On 8 July 2025, Carlsson announced that he was ending his career, to become a youth coach and work in the marketing department at the club.
