= Tino Kadewere =

Zimbabwean footballer (born 1996)

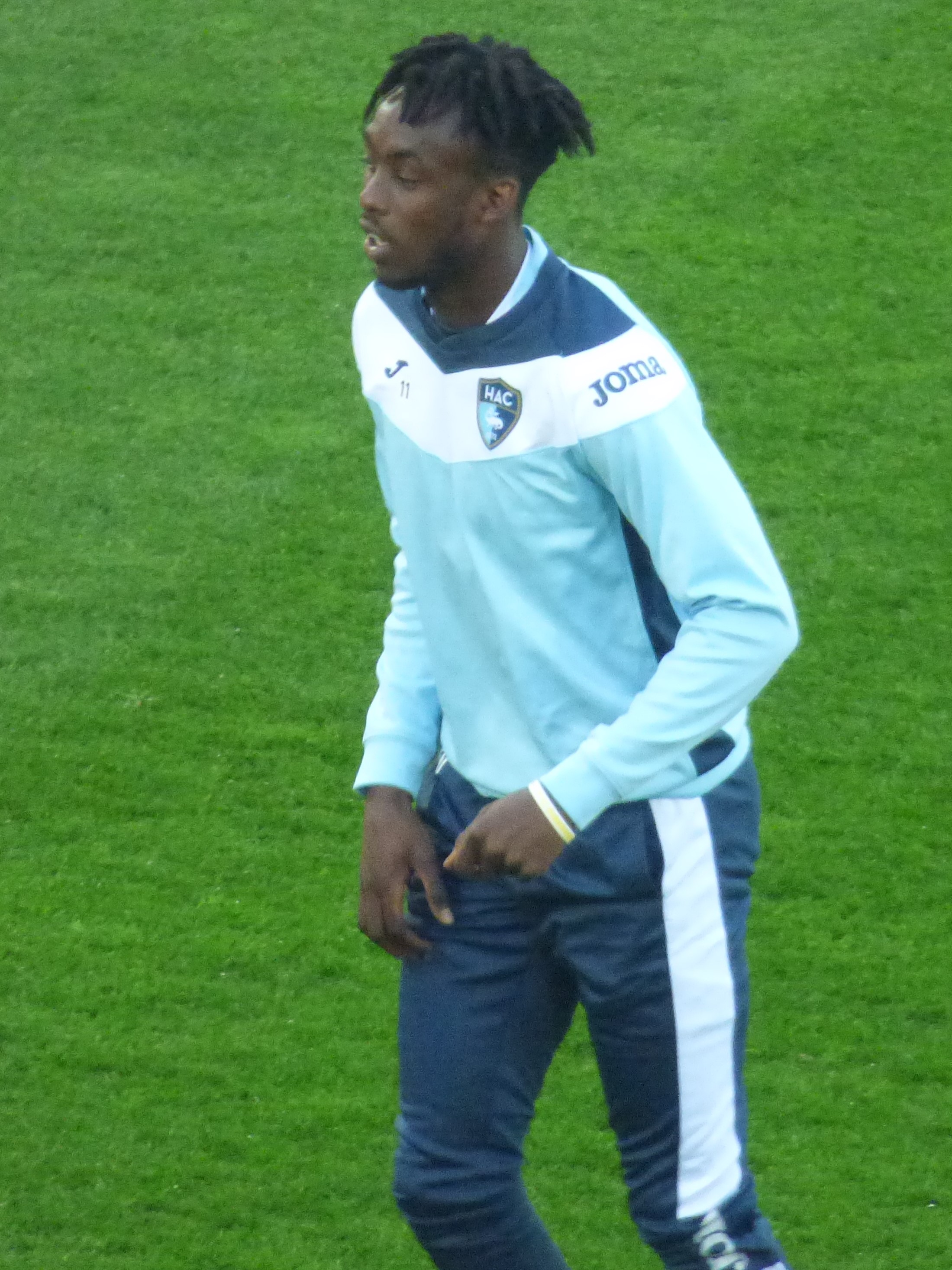
- Kadewere with Le Havre in 2019

Personal information
- Full name: Philana Tinotenda Kadewere
- Date of birth: 5 January 1996 (age 30)
- Place of birth: Highfield, Zimbabwe
- Height: 1.83 m (6 ft 0 in)
- Positions: Forward; winger

Team information
- Current team: Aris
- Number: 9

Youth career
- 2011–2013: Prince Edward School
- 2014: Harare City

Senior career*
Years	Team	Apps	(Gls)
2015	Harare City		
2015	→ Djurgårdens IF (loan)	5	(0)
2016–2018	Djurgårdens IF	43	(13)
2018–2020	Le Havre	43	(23)
2020–2024	Lyon	59	(11)
2020	→ Le Havre (loan)	4	(2)
2022–2023	→ Mallorca (loan)	15	(1)
2024	→ Nantes (loan)	14	(1)
2024–2025	Nantes	12	(1)
2025–	Aris	25	(6)

International career^{‡}
2015–	Zimbabwe	28	(3)
Medal record
Representing Zimbabwe
COSAFA Cup
Winner	2018 South Africa
- * Club domestic league appearances and goals as of 10 November 2026 ‡ National team caps and goals as of 23:49, 5 September 2025 (UTC)

Philana Tinotenda "Tino" Kadewere (born 5 January 1996) is a Zimbabwean professional footballer who plays as a forward or winger for Greek Super League club Aris and the Zimbabwe national team.

== Club career ==
=== Zimbabwe ===
Kadewere was picked by Harare City in 2014 after he had finished playing for his high school team at Prince Edward School. During the first half of his debut season with the first team, he scored seven goals in the Zimbabwe Premier Soccer League.

=== Djurgårdens IF ===
During the summer of 2015, Kadewere went for trials with Swedish first division club Djurgårdens IF and French Ligue 2 side Sochaux. Later he decided to join Djurgårdens IF on loan in August 2015 for the remainder of the season with an option for the club to sign him permanently on a four-year deal at the end of the year. He made his Allsvenskan debut on 29 August 2015. He later joined Djurgården permanently.

Kadewere scored his first league goal for the club on 25 July 2016. It was a consolation goal in the 94th minute of a 3–1 home loss to GIF Sundsvall having been subbed on in the 85th minute.

On 27 May 2018, he scored four goals in a league game against IK Sirius, making him the first Djurgården player since Tommy Berggren in 1978 to score four goals in a single league game.

=== Le Havre ===
In July 2018, Kadewere joined French Ligue 2 side Le Havre on a four-year contract. The transfer fee paid to Djurgården was reported as $2.5 million.

=== Lyon ===
On 22 January 2020, Kadewere signed with Ligue 1 club Olympique Lyonnais. The deal also saw him stay at Le Havre on loan for the remainder of the 2019–20 season.

Kadewere began with the Lyon squad for the 2020–21 season. On 8 November 2020, he scored a brace for Lyon in a 2–1 win over Saint-Étienne.

==== Loan to Mallorca ====
On 29 August 2022, Kadewere joined Mallorca in Spain on loan with an option-to-buy.

=== Nantes ===
On 4 January 2024, Kadewere joined fellow Ligue 1 side Nantes on loan with an option-to-buy. On 14 May 2024, he was permanently transferred to Nantes after the club avoided relegation. Lyon received no transfer fee, but would retain a 25% sell-on clause. On 6 July 2024, Kadewere clarified that his contract with Nantes lasted until 2026, and not 2027 as previously reported.

== International career ==
Kadewere represented Zimbabwe at the under-17, under-20 and under-23 youth levels. He made his international debut for the senior team in a 2–0 win against the Comoros on 21 June 2015.

== Career statistics ==
=== Club ===
As of match played 4 May 2025

Appearances and goals by club, season and competition
Club	Season	League			Cup		Other		Total	
Club	Season	Division	Apps	Goals	Apps	Goals	Apps	Goals	Apps	Goals
Djurgårdens IF (loan)	2015	Allsvenskan	5	0	1	1	—		6	1
Djurgårdens IF	2016	Allsvenskan	21	3	4	0	—		25	3
Djurgårdens IF	2017	Allsvenskan	10	2	1	0	—		11	2
Djurgårdens IF	2018	Allsvenskan	12	8	6	4	—		18	12
Djurgårdens IF	Total		48	13	12	5	—		60	18
Le Havre B	2018–19	Championnat National 2	1	0	—		—		1	0
Le Havre	2018–19	Ligue 2	23	5	2	1	2 (Note: Appearances in the Coupe de la Ligue)	1	27	7
Le Havre	2019–20 (Note: Part of the season spent on loan from Lyon)	Ligue 2	24	20	0	0	0	0	24	20
Le Havre	Total		47	25	2	1	2	1	51	27
Lyon	2020–21	Ligue 1	33	10	0	0	—		33	10
Lyon	2021–22	Ligue 1	15	1	0	0	5 (Note: Appearance(s) in UEFA Europa League)	0	20	1
Lyon	2022–23	Ligue 1	0	0	0	0	—		0	0
Lyon	2023–24	Ligue 1	11	0	0	0	—		11	0
Lyon	Total		59	11	0	0	5	0	64	11
Mallorca (loan)	2022–23	La Liga	15	1	4	1	—		19	2
Nantes (loan)	2023–24	Ligue 1	14	1	2	2	—		16	3
Nantes	2024–25	Ligue 1	12	1	0	0	—		12	1
Nantes	2025–26	Ligue 1	0	0	0	0	—		0	0
Nantes	Total		26	2	2	2	—		28	4
Career total			196	52	20	9	7	1	223	62

=== International ===
As of match played 7 June 2024

Appearances and goals by national team and year
National team	Year	Apps	Goals
Zimbabwe	2015	2	0
Zimbabwe	2016	2	0
Zimbabwe	2017	1	0
Zimbabwe	2018	6	2
Zimbabwe	2019	5	0
Zimbabwe	2020	2	1
Zimbabwe	2021	1	0
Zimbabwe	2022	3	0
Zimbabwe	2023	2	0
Zimbabwe	2024	3	0
Total		27	3

As of match played 12 November 2020.

Scores and results list Zimbabwe's goal tally first, score column indicates score after each Kadewere goal.

List of international goals scored by Tino Kadewere
No.	Date	Venue	Opponent	Score	Result	Competition
1.	9 June 2018	Peter Mokaba Stadium, Polokwane, South Africa	Zambia	1–0	4–2 (a.e.t.)	2018 COSAFA Cup
2.	9 June 2018	Peter Mokaba Stadium, Polokwane, South Africa	Zambia	2–2	4–2 (a.e.t.)	2018 COSAFA Cup
3.	12 November 2020	Stade 5 Juillet 1962, Algiers, Algeria	Algeria	1–3	1–3	2021 Africa Cup of Nations qualification

== Honours ==
Djurgårdens IF

- Svenska Cupen: 2017–18

Zimbabwe

- COSAFA Cup: 2018

Individual

- Ligue 2 UNFP Player of the Month: August 2019
- Ligue 2 top goalscorer: 2019–20
