= Elliot Käck =

Swedish footballer (born 1989)

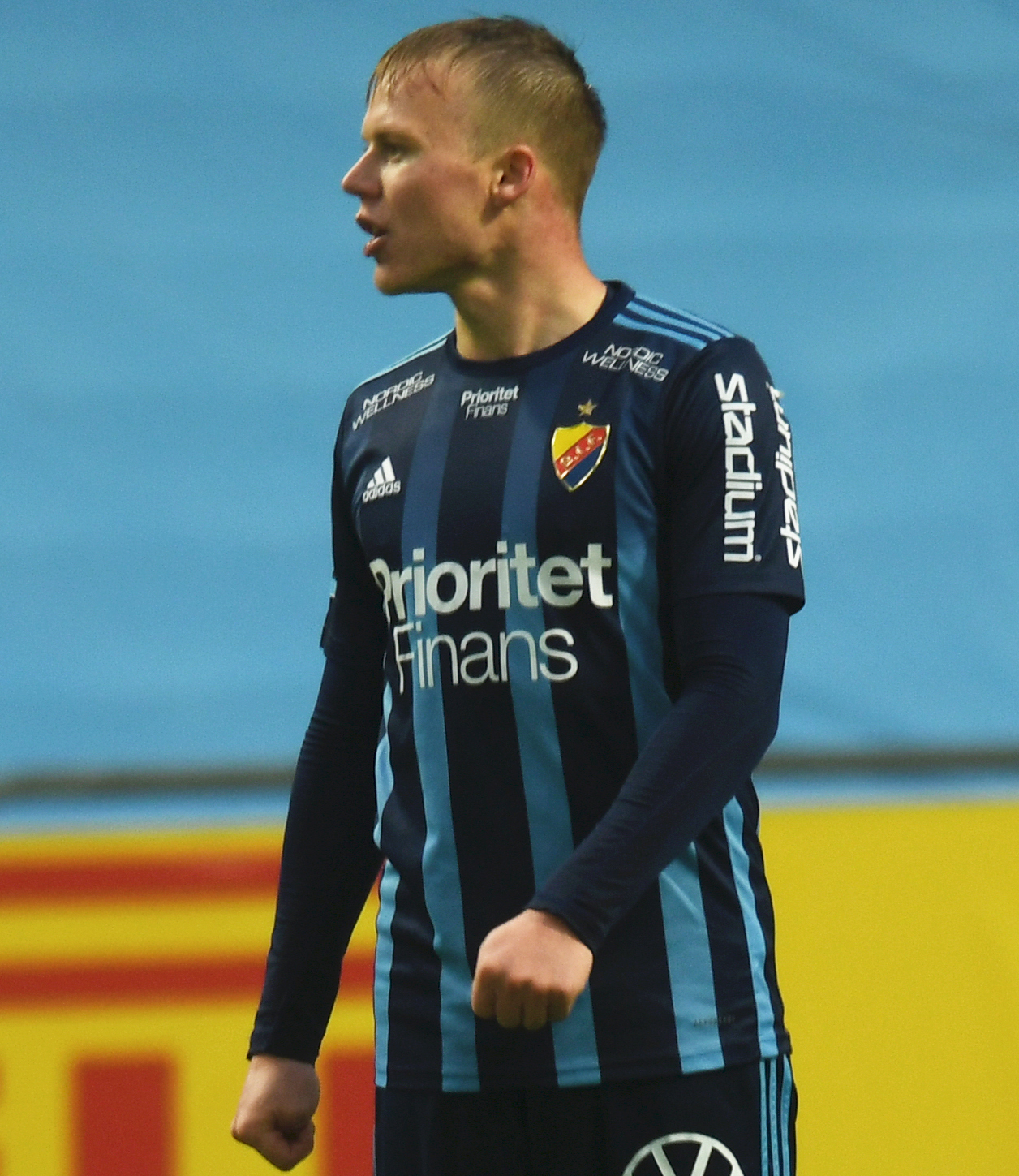
- Käck playing for Djurgårdens IF

Personal information
- Full name: Carl Elliot Leifson Käck
- Date of birth: 18 September 1989 (age 37)
- Place of birth: Stockholm, Sweden
- Height: 1.73 m (5 ft 8 in)
- Position: Left back

Youth career
- 1995–2008: Djurgårdens IF

Senior career*
Years	Team	Apps	(Gls)
2008	Djurgårdens IF	0	(0)
2008	→ Värtans IK (loan)	19	(1)
2009	Värmdö IF	22	(5)
2010–2011	Hammarby Talang FF	49	(6)
2012–2014	IK Sirius	69	(8)
2015–2017	Djurgårdens IF	79	(1)
2018	Start	28	(2)
2019–2023	Djurgårdens IF	82	(0)
- * Club domestic league appearances and goals

Elliot Käck (Swedish pronunciation: [ˈɛ̌lːɪjɔt ˈɕɛkː]; born 18 September 1989) is a Swedish former footballer who played as a left back.

== Career ==
Käck started playing football with Djurgårdens IF when he was six years old and stayed with the club throughout his youth career. At the age of 18 he went on loan to fifth tier side Värtans IK and after leaving Djurgården the following year he played for fourth tier club Värmdö IF and then Hammarby Talang FF in the third tier Division 1. In 2012, he switched clubs in the third tier when he moved to IK Sirius where he helped the club win promotion to Superettan.

Käck joined Djurgården from IK Sirius after the 2014 season. He made his Allsvenskan debut on 9 April 2015 in the BK Häcken–Djurgårdens IF 1–1 draw. He spent most of the season being the backup for the left back position but toward the end he became a regular starter. He made his first Allsvenskan goal on 2 October 2016 in the IFK Norrköping–Djurgårdens IF 1–3 match.

On 8 December 2017 it was announced that Käck would leave Djurgården after three years at the club.

He signed for IK Start in the Eliteserien in December 2017.

In January 2019, Käck returned to Djurgården after one year in Start.

== Personal life ==
A Djurgården fan since childhood, as a youngster Käck attended all the club's home games and derbies and stood in the singing section. His father Leif Käck, an A&R man, lyricist and music-business executive since the 1980s, and noted for breaking Orup, is the founder of Roxy Recordings. Elliot has recording music as one of his hobbies.

== Honours ==
Djurgårdens IF

- Allsvenskan: 2019
