= Hampus Nilsson =

Swedish footballer

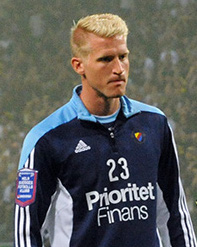
- Nilsson in 2015

Personal information
- Date of birth: 17 July 1990 (age 36)
- Place of birth: Osby, Sweden
- Height: 1.90 m (6 ft 3 in)
- Position: Goalkeeper

Team information
- Current team: Eskilsminne

Youth career
- 1994–2006: IFK Osby

Senior career*
Years	Team	Apps	(Gls)
2007	Landskrona BoIS	0	(0)
2008–2012	Helsingborgs IF	0	(0)
2009	→ Högaborgs BK (loan)	18	(0)
2010–2011	→ IFK Värnamo (loan)	43	(1)
2012	→ Ängelholms FF (loan)	13	(0)
2013–2016	Djurgårdens IF	8	(0)
2016	→ Östersunds FK (loan)	6	(0)
2017–2019	Falkenbergs FF	29	(0)
2020–2021	Trelleborgs FF	29	(0)
2022–	Eskilsminne	0	(0)

International career
2007	Sweden U19	2	(0)
- * Club domestic league appearances and goals as of 27 November 2021

Hampus Nilsson (born 17 July 1990) is a Swedish footballer who plays as a goalkeeper for Eskilsminne.

== Career ==
Hampus Nilsson started his career in IFK Osby as a four year old. He played both as a field player and goalkeeper until the age of thirteen when he decided to focus on the latter. After a year at Landskrona BoIS he joined Helsingborgs IF where he would never get any first team playtime but instead spent several seasons on loan. During his loan with IFK Värnamo in 2010 he helped the club win promotion to second tier Superettan where he also played the following year and then with Ängelholms FF in 2012.

After being released by Helsingborg at the end of 2012 Nilsson was considering retiring from football when he was contacted by agent Markus Karlsson who arranged a trial for him with Allsvenskan club Djurgårdens IF which resulted in a two-year deal before the start of the 2013 Allsvenskan season. In October 2014 he signed a new four-year contract. He finally made his Allsvenskan debut for Djurgården in a 2–0 win against Falkenberg on 24 October 2015, playing for the first time instead of Kenneth Høie who spent the previous 101 games on the pitch.

On 11 August 2016 Nilsson was loaned out to Allsvenskan side Östersunds FK for the rest of the season due to the arrival of Andreas Isaksson.

On 1 December 2016 Nilsson signed for Falkenbergs FF. Nilsson was one out of six players who left the club at the end of 2019. On 8 January 2020, Nilsson signed a two-year deal with Trelleborgs FF.

On 30 November 2021, Nilsson agreed to join Eskilsminne in the fourth-tier Division 2 for the 2022 season.

== International career ==
Nilsson played two games for the Sweden men's national under-19 football team in 2007.

== Personal life ==
Nilsson also played ice hockey in his youth, but when he signed with Landskrona BoIS in 2007 he made the decision to solely focus on football. After joining Djurgården he often stood with the singing section at the home games of the clubs hockey team, which quickly made him a favourite among the fans.
