= Romário (footballer, born 1985) =

Brazilian footballer

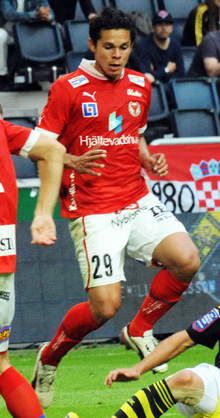

Personal information
- Full name: Romário Pereira Sipião
- Date of birth: 10 August 1985 (age 41)
- Place of birth: Imperatriz, Maranhão, Brazil
- Height: 1.75 m (5 ft 9 in)
- Position: Midfielder

Team information
- Current team: Academy Kalmar

Youth career
- Imperatriz
- –2009: JV Lideral

Senior career*
Years	Team	Apps	(Gls)
2009–2012	GAIS	70	(7)
2013–2024	Kalmar	330	(35)
Total		400	(72)

Managerial career
- 2025–: Academy Kalmar
- * Club domestic league appearances and goals

For the Brazilian footballer and politician born in 1966, see Romário.

Romário Pereira Sipião (born 10 August 1985), commonly known as Romário or Romarinho, is a Brazilian and Swedish football coach and former midfielder.

== Club career ==
Romário scored his first goal for GAIS against Helsingborgs IF in October 2010, a crucial goal in the fight for the title, since the goal ultimately cost Helsingborg three points against title rivals Malmö FF. Romário is famous for good passing and ball handling skills, but can sometimes be hot-headed and receive red cards, seemingly from nowhere. In early 2019 he prolonged his contract with Kalmar FF for another 4.5 years.

After the 2022 season, he has played 271 matches in Allsvenskan for Kalmar FF, this puts him in second place of all time among KFF-players in the Swedish top-flight.
