= Erik Granat =

Swedish footballer (born 1995)

Personal information
- Full name: Erik Tobias Granat
- Date of birth: 9 August 1995 (age 31)
- Place of birth: Sweden
- Height: 1.71 m (5 ft 7 in)
- Position: Midfielder

Team information
- Current team: Gefle IF
- Number: 7

Youth career
- –2013: GIF Sundsvall

Senior career*
| Years | Team | Apps | (Gls) |
| 2014–2018 | GIF Sundsvall | 29 | (1) |
| 2019 | Team TG FF | 29 | (9) |
| 2020– | Gefle IF | 27 | (4) |
- * Club domestic league appearances and goals as of 11:48, 7 March 2021 (UTC)

Erik Granat (born 9 August 1995) is a Swedish footballer who plays for Gefle IF as a midfielder.
