= Othman El Kabir =

Dutch footballer (born 1991)

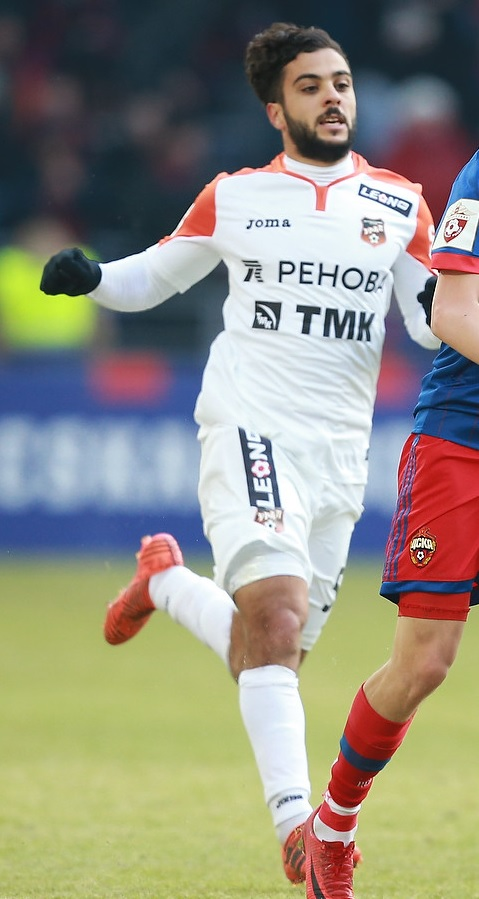
- El Kabir with Ural Yekaterinburg in 2018

Personal information
- Date of birth: 17 July 1991 (age 35)
- Place of birth: Amsterdam, Netherlands
- Height: 1.78 m (5 ft 10 in)
- Position: Midfielder

Youth career
- FC Blauw-Wit Amsterdam
- DCG
- FC Utrecht
- DCG
- –2013: NAC Breda

Senior career*
Years	Team	Apps	(Gls)
2010	Sölvesborgs GoIF	2	(0)
2013–2014	Ängelholms FF	51	(7)
2015–2016	AFC United	42	(14)
2016–2018	Djurgårdens IF	42	(5)
2018–2021	Ural Yekaterinburg	74	(13)
2023	Jönköpings Södra IF	4	(0)
- * Club domestic league appearances and goals as of 13:58, 17 November 2023 (UTC)

Othman El Kabir (Arabic: عثمان الكبير; born 17 July 1991) is a Dutch footballer who plays as a left midfielder.

== Club career ==
=== Djurgårdens IF ===
El Kabir signed a 3 1/2-year deal with Swedish top-tier Djurgårdens IF on 14 July 2016. On 24 August El Kabir scored his first goals for Djurgården, scoring two goals in the Swedish Cup qualifier 5–1 win against Smedby AIS.

On 19 February 2018 El Kabir signed with Ural Yekaterinburg. He left Ural on 30 June 2021.

In August 2023, after two years without a club, he signed for Jönköpings Södra IF in Superettan.

== Personal life ==
Othman El Kabir is the younger brother of Moestafa El Kabir.

== Career statistics ==
As of 13 May 2018

Club	Season	League			Cup		Continental		Total	
Club	Season	Division	Apps	Goals	Apps	Goals	Apps	Goals	Apps	Goals
Ängelholm	2013	Superettan	23	2	1	2	–		24	4
Ängelholm	2014	Superettan	28	5	3	1	–		31	6
Ängelholm	Total		51	7	4	3	0	0	55	10
AFC Eskilstuna	2015	Superettan	27	8	4	1	–		31	9
AFC Eskilstuna	2016	Superettan	15	6	3	1	–		18	7
AFC Eskilstuna	Total		42	14	7	2	0	0	49	16
Djurgården	2016	Allsvenskan	13	1	1	2	–		14	3
Djurgården	2017	Allsvenskan	29	4	4	1	–		33	5
Djurgården	Total		42	5	5	3	0	0	47	8
Ural Yekaterinburg	2017–18	Russian Premier League	10	3	–		–		10	3
Career total			145	29	16	8	0	0	161	37
