= Filip Tasic =

Swedish footballer

Personal information
- Date of birth: 12 November 1998 (age 27)
- Place of birth: Sweden
- Height: 1.82 m (6 ft 0 in)
- Position: Centre midfielder

Youth career
- –2006: Nackadala AIS
- 2006–2016: Djurgårdens IF

Senior career*
Years	Team	Apps	(Gls)
2016–2017	Djurgårdens IF	1	(0)
2017	→ Arameiska-Syrianska IF (loan)	4	(0)
2018	Vasalund IF		

International career
2013–2014	Sweden U17	4	(0)
- * Club domestic league appearances and goals as of 16 May 2018

Filip Tasic (born 12 November 1998) is a Swedish footballer of Serbian ancestry who plays a midfielder.

== Career ==
=== Youth career ===
Tasic started out his football career at local club Nackadala AIS. At the age of eight he moved to Djurgårdens IF. During his years at the academy Tasic had trials with Premier League clubs Arsenal and West Bromwich Albion. In January 2015 Tasic decided to reject the offer from West Bromwich Albion and to sign an U-21-contract with Djurgårdens IF.

=== Djurgårdens IF ===
Tasic made his debut in Allsvenskan for Djurgårdens IF in a 5–2 win against GIF Sundsvall on 6 November 2016 coming on as a sub in the last match of the season. In 2017, he went on a loan to third-tier team Arameiska-Syrianska IF.

== International career ==
Tasic has represented the Sweden men's national under-17 football team.
