= Pontus Åsbrink =

Swedish footballer

Personal information
- Full name: Pontus Per Åsbrink
- Date of birth: 27 June 1992 (age 34)
- Place of birth: Sweden
- Height: 1.77 m (5 ft 9 1/2 in)
- Position: Right winger

Team information
- Current team: Akropolis IF
- Number: 8

Youth career
- –2004: Spånga IS
- 2004–2009: IF Brommapojkarna

Senior career*
Years	Team	Apps	(Gls)
2010–2015	IF Brommapojkarna	122	(12)
2010	→ Gröndals IK (loan)	6	(0)
2016–2017	IK Frej	52	(9)
2018	IFK Mariehamn	25	(2)
2019–	Akropolis IF	9	(3)

International career
2009	Sweden U17	7	(1)
2010–2011	Sweden U19	5	(0)
- * Club domestic league appearances and goals as of 15:03, 30 May 2019 (UTC)

Pontus Åsbrink (born 27 June 1992) is a Swedish footballer who plays for Akropolis IF as a right winger.

== Career ==
Åsbrink left IFK Mariehamn at the end of 2018.
