= Marcus Hansson (footballer) =

Swedish footballer

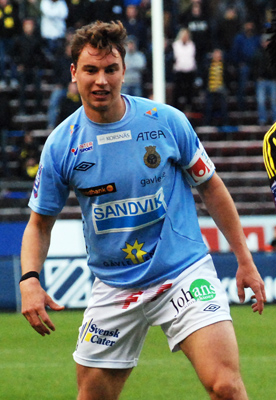
- Hansson playing for Gefle IF

Personal information
- Date of birth: 12 February 1990 (age 36)
- Place of birth: Sweden
- Height: 1.86 m (6 ft 1 in)
- Positions: Midfielder; defender

Youth career
- Åbyggeby FK

Senior career*
Years	Team	Apps	(Gls)
2006	Brynäs IF		
2007–2014	Gefle IF	156	(7)
2008	→ Falu FK (loan)	2	(0)
2015	Tromsø	25	(1)
2016–2019	Djurgårdens IF	25	(0)
2018	→ IK Frej (loan)	28	(0)
2019	→ IF Brommapojkarna (loan)	22	(0)

International career
2006	Sweden U17	3	(0)
2007	Sweden U19	2	(1)
2011	Sweden U21	1	(0)
- * Club domestic league appearances and goals as of 3 November 2019

Marcus Hansson (born 12 February 1990) is a Swedish footballer who plays as a defender and is currently without a club.

== Career ==
Hansson started out playing for Åbyggeby FK before spending one season at lower division Gävle based club Brynäs IF. At the age of 17 he made the move to the local top tier Allsvenskan club Gefle IF where he would stay for seven years and become team captain in 2014. After the 2014 Allsvenskan season had ended he was given the most valuable player award by the Gefle fans and signed with Norwegian side Tromsø.

In Norway Hansson was involved in a controversial situation when a rough tackle on Bjørn Helge Riise caused his brother John Arne Riise to lash out against Hansson in the media, comparing the tackle to a criminal act. In February 2016 Djurgårdens IF announced that they had bought Hansson from his Norwegian club with the intention of using him as a central defender in their upcoming season.

== International career ==
Hansson has represented Sweden at the U17, U19 and U21 youth levels.

== Personal life ==
Hansson has mixed his career of playing professional football with studying economics at university.
