= Jacob Une =

Swedish footballer

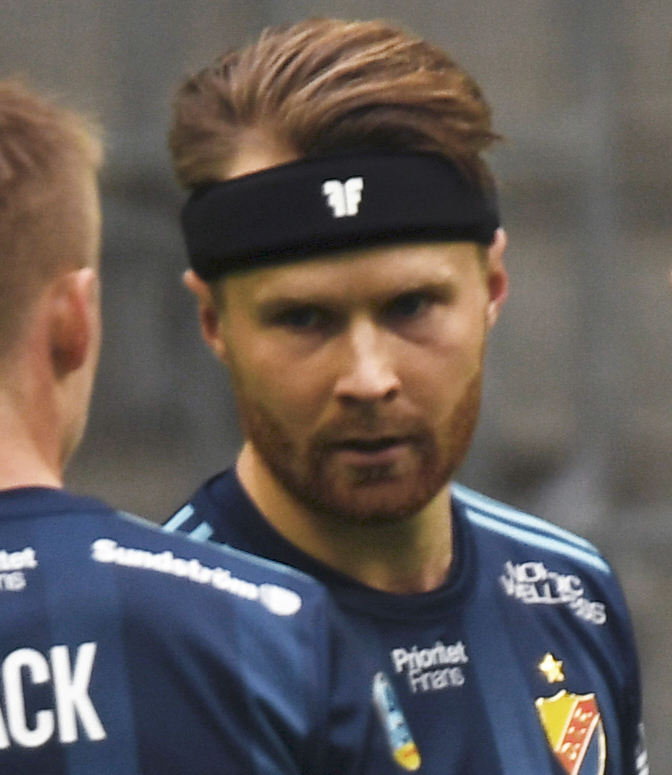
- Une playing for Djurgårdens IF

Personal information
- Full name: Jacob Hugo Une
- Date of birth: 8 April 1994 (age 32)
- Place of birth: Stockholm, Sweden
- Height: 1.81 m (5 ft 11 in)
- Position: Defender

Team information
- Current team: Djurgårdens IF
- Number: 4

Youth career
- 1999–2010: IF Brommapojkarna

Senior career*
Years	Team	Apps	(Gls)
2011–2015	IF Brommapojkarna	94	(9)
2016–	Djurgårdens IF	222	(9)
2022–2023	→ Panetolikos (loan)	43	(0)

International career^{‡}
2009–2011	Sweden U17	17	(1)
2012	Sweden U19	3	(0)
2015–2017	Sweden U21/O	16	(2)
2017–2020	Sweden	3	(0)
- * Club domestic league appearances and goals as of 23:32, 16 October 2026 ‡ National team caps and goals as of 01:10, 16 January 2022 (UTC)

Jacob Hugo Une (born Jacob Hugo Une Larsson on 8 April 1994) is a Swedish professional footballer who plays as a defender for Djurgårdens IF.

== Club career ==
After breaking into the first team at the end of the 2012 Superettan season where IF Brommapojkarna were promoted he established himself as a starting central defender for the team the following year in Swedish top tier Allsvenskan. At only 20 years of age he took over the role as team captain in 2014 after previous captain Pontus Segerström died. The club was relegated back down to Superettan at the end of the season.

=== Djurgårdens IF ===
In July 2015, it was confirmed that Une would join Allsvenskan club Djurgårdens IF on a three-year contract starting in 2016. Une admitted that he chose Djurgården over Norwegian powerhouse Rosenborg BK. When the signing was announced he declared that he was a Djurgården supporter in "heart and soul", a statement which angered fans of Brommapojkarna since he had four months remaining of his contract with the club and also had been playing for Brommapojkarna his whole career. On 2 October 2016 Une scored his first goal for Djurgården with a header in the 3–2 win against Örebro SK. On 10 May 2018, he scored as Djurgården beat Malmö FF 3–0 in the Swedish Cup Final.

== International career ==
Une has represented the Sweden men's national under-17 football team, Sweden men's national under-19 football team and Sweden national under-21 football team. Une was selected in the Swedish Olympic squad for the 2016 Summer Olympics in Rio de Janeiro, Brazil. He played and scored in the friendly game ahead of the Olympic games and played two games in the tournament.

== Career statistics ==
=== Club ===
As of match played 10 November 2024

Appearances and goals by club, season and competition
Club	Season	League			National cup (Note: Includes Svenska Cupen, Greek Cup)		Continental		Other		Total	
Club	Season	Division	Apps	Goals	Apps	Goals	Apps	Goals	Apps	Goals	Apps	Goals
IF Brommapojkarna	2011	Superettan	1	0	0	0	—		—		1	0
IF Brommapojkarna	2012	Superettan	8	3	0	0	—		—		8	3
IF Brommapojkarna	2013	Allsvenskan	29	0	1	0	—		—		30	0
IF Brommapojkarna	2014	Allsvenskan	27	2	5	0	5 (Note: Appearance(s) in UEFA Europa League)	2	—		37	4
IF Brommapojkarna	2015	Superettan	29	4	4	0	—		—		33	4
IF Brommapojkarna	Total		94	9	10	0	5	2	—		109	11
Djurgårdens IF	2016	Allsvenskan	13	1	3	0	—		—		16	1
Djurgårdens IF	2017	Allsvenskan	29	1	3	0	—		—		32	1
Djurgårdens IF	2018	Allsvenskan	24	1	7	2	2	0	—		33	3
Djurgårdens IF	2019	Allsvenskan	25	2	5	1	—		—		30	3
Djurgårdens IF	2020	Allsvenskan	27	0	4	1	3 (Note: One appearance in UEFA Champions League, Two appearances in UEFA Europa League)	0	—		34	1
Djurgårdens IF	2021	Allsvenskan	28	3	3	1	—		—		31	4
Djurgårdens IF	2023	Allsvenskan	14	0	1	0	2 (Note: Appearance(s) in UEFA Europa Conference League)	0	—		17	0
Djurgårdens IF	2024	Allsvenskan	22	0	2	0	8	0	—		31	0
Djurgårdens IF	Total		182	8	28	5	15	0	—		225	13
Panetolikos (loan)	2021-22	Super League Greece	12	0	1	0	—		—		13	0
Panetolikos (loan)	2022-23	Super League Greece	31	0	0	0	—		—		31	0
Panetolikos (loan)	Total		43	0	1	0	—		—		44	0
Career total			319	17	39	5	20	2	—		378	24

=== International ===
As of match played 12 January 2020

National team	Year	Apps	Goals
Sweden	2017	1	0
Sweden	2018	1	0
Sweden	2019	0	0
Sweden	2020	1	0
Total		3	0

== Honours ==
Djurgårdens IF

- Allsvenskan: 2019
- Svenska Cupen: 2017–18
