= Alexander Faltsetas =

Swedish footballer

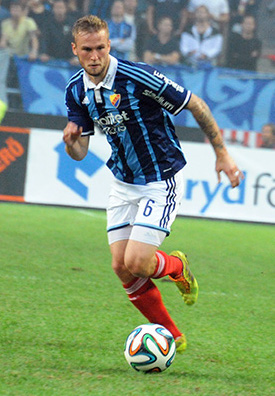
- Faltsetas playing for Djurgårdens IF

Personal information
- Full name: Alexander Daniel Faltsetas
- Date of birth: 4 July 1987 (age 39)
- Place of birth: Gothenburg, Sweden
- Height: 1.81 m (5 ft 11 1/2 in)
- Position: Defensive midfielder

Youth career
- –2005: Västra Frölunda IF

Senior career*
Years	Team	Apps	(Gls)
2005–2008	Västra Frölunda IF	41	(5)
2009	FC Trollhättan	28	(2)
2010–2011	IFK Göteborg	20	(0)
2011	→ IK Brage (loan)	11	(2)
2012–2013	Gefle IF	56	(6)
2014–2016	Djurgårdens IF	76	(3)
2017–2022	BK Häcken	112	(6)
2022	→ Helsingborgs IF (loan)	13	(0)
2023–2025	Utsiktens BK	77	(2)
Total		434	(26)

International career
2006	Sweden U19	1	(0)
- * Club domestic league appearances and goals

Alexander Daniel Faltsetas (born 4 July 1987) is a Swedish former professional footballer who played as defensive midfielder.

== Career ==
Faltsetas started out playing as a child in the Gothenburg based club Västra Frölunda and stayed with them until 2009 when he signed with Superettan side FC Trollhättan after a trial.

He initially started out as an attacking midfielder in Trollhättan but gradually moved back to a more defensive role where he had enough success that Allsvenskan club IFK Göteborg signed him the following year. There he played 19 games in his first season, but saw his playing time reduced to one substitute appearance his second year. Due to the lack of playing time he was loaned to IK Brage in Superettan. Brage wanted to keep him after the season but he instead chose to sign with Gefle IF.

His contract with Gefle ended after the 2013 season and when manager Per Olsson made the move to Djurgårdens IF at the start of 2014 he brought his "favourite player" Faltsetas with him to the new club on a three-year deal.

== Personal life ==
Faltsetas has a Greek father. His favourite Greek football club is PAOK from his father's hometown Thessaloniki.
