= Tim Björkström =

Swedish footballer

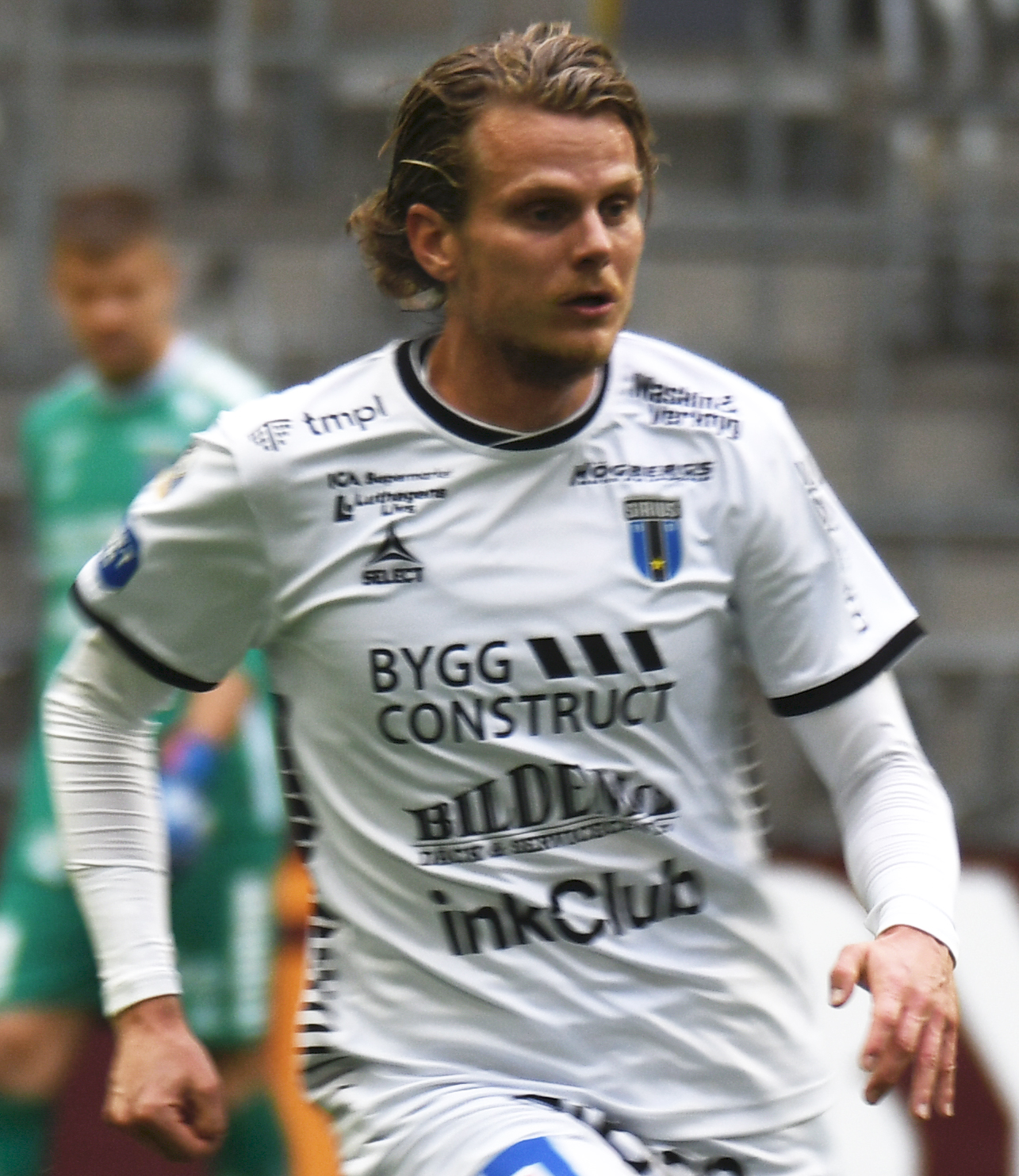
- Björkström playing for IK Sirius in 2020

Personal information
- Full name: Tim Denny Björkström
- Date of birth: 8 January 1991 (age 35)
- Place of birth: Raksta, Sweden
- Height: 1.80 m (5 ft 11 in)
- Position: Defender

Youth career
- Hanvikens SK
- Hammarby IF
- 2003–2007: IF Brommapojkarna

Senior career*
| Years | Team | Apps | (Gls) |
| 2008–2014 | IF Brommapojkarna | 144 | (5) |
| 2008–2009 | → Gröndals IK (loan) | 18 | (0) |
| 2015–2017 | Djurgårdens IF | 47 | (0) |
| 2017 | → Östersunds FK (loan) | 11 | (1) |
| 2018–2023 | IK Sirius | 129 | (2) |
| 2023–2024 | Fredrikstad | 14 | (0) |
| 2024 | → Moss (loan) | 7 | (0) |

International career
| 2006–2008 | Sweden U17 | 19 | (0) |
| 2009–2010 | Sweden U19 | 11 | (2) |
| 2011 | Sweden U21 | 2 | (0) |
- * Club domestic league appearances and goals as of 14 November 2024

Tim Denny Björkström (born 8 January 1991) is a Swedish footballer. He last played for Fredrikstad as a defender.

== Career ==
Björkström started out playing youth football for Hanvikens SK before moving to IF Brommapojkarna when he was twelve. During his teens he trialed with foreign teams like Liverpool F.C. but ended up staying in Sweden. Brommapojkarna had a cooperation with third tier Stockholm club Gröndals IK at the time where Björkström was one of many players to go on loan to gain first team football experience.

In 2009, he made his first team debut in Allsvenskan and became a starter for the club at right back throughout the following years until he left as a free agent at the end of 2014 to sign a three-year deal with Djurgårdens IF.

In January 2023, Björkström joined Norwegian First Division club Fredrikstad.

On 25 August 2024, Björkström was loaned out to Norwegian First Division club Moss FK for the rest of the season.

== International career ==
Björkström has represented Sweden at the U17, U19 and U21 youth levels.

== Personal life ==
Outside of his football career Björkström also owns and runs a car restoration company. The night before each game he has a ritual where he eats candy, potato chips and drinks soda.
