= Molodyozhnaya Station (Antarctica) =

Molodyozhnaya Station Молодёжная
- Antarctic station
- Molodyozhnaya Station

- Location of Molodyozhnaya Station in Antarctica
- Coordinates: 67°39′57″S 45°50′28″E
- Country: Soviet Union; Russia
- Location in Antarctica: Thala Hills, Enderby Land (East Antarctica), Australian Antarctic Territory
- Administered by: Arctic and Antarctic Research Institute
- Established: February 1962 reopened 2006
- Closed: 26 December 1990
- Elevation: 40 m (130 ft)

Population (2017)
  - Summer: 15
  - Winter: 0
- Type: All-year round
- Period: Annual
- Status: Closed and reopened as seasonally
- Activities: List: Environmental sciences; Geodesy; Pollution
- Website: www.aari.nw.ru

Molodyozhnaya (Russian: Молодёжная, "Youth") (also known as "Molodezhnaya") was a Soviet, then Russian research station in East Antarctica at 67°40′S 45°50′E. After being mothballed in 1990, it was reopened in 2006 to operate on a seasonal basis. In Russian, the station is sometimes referred to as the capital of Antarctica.

== Location ==
Molodyozhnaya Station is located in the Thala Hills, 500–600 meters inland from the coast on the southern shore of Alasheyev Bight in the Cosmonaut Sea, at 42 meters above sea level. The area around the station is composed mostly of rocky ridges separated by snow-covered depressions and lakes. The sea near the station is covered in pack ice for much of the year, out to a distance of as much as 100 km at the end of winter. The rise to the summit of the massive East Antarctic Ice Sheet (Dome A) begins 1.5-2.0 km from the shore. Kheis Glacier is located in 15 km east of the station, and Campbell Glacier is roughly the same distance to the southwest.

== History ==
The site was opened in February 1962, and used as a launch site for suborbital meteorological sounding rockets. From 25 May 1969 and 26 December 1990, 1104 M-100 model research sounding rockets were launched from Molodyozhnaya Station. On 28 February 1979, the MMR06 model was launched from Molodyozhnaya. This was the only instance of this model rocket being launched from Molodyozhnaya Station.

Funding for meteorological research became scarce during the late 1980s, as the Soviet Union was collapsing. Launches of the M-100 abruptly ended in 1990, and the station was mothballed. In the 1990s, several scientific and environmental studies were undertaken in the area to fulfill the requirements of the Protocol for the Defence of Nature in the Antarctic Treaty System, but the station wasn't reopened.

In February 2006, Valeriy Lukin, the head of the Russian Antarctic Expedition (RAE), said:

There are plans to open the mothballed stations Molodyozhnaya, Leningradskaya and Russkaya in the 2007-2008 season. This will bring great benefits because these stations are located in the Pacific section of Antarctica, which is poorly covered by scientific studies.

Since 2006, it has operated on a seasonal basis. When open during the Antarctic summer there is occasional amateur radio operation by station personnel.

== Climate ==
The average temperature varies from −19 °C in the coldest months (July–August), to around 0 °C in January.

Climate data for Molodyozhnaya Station (1963–1999)
Month	Jan	Feb	Mar	Apr	May	Jun	Jul	Aug	Sep	Oct	Nov	Dec	Year
Mean daily maximum °C (°F)	2.4 (36.3)	−0.9 (30.4)	−5.2 (22.6)	−8.7 (16.3)	−11.4 (11.5)	−13.1 (8.4)	−14.2 (6.4)	−15.2 (4.6)	−14.1 (6.6)	−9.9 (14.2)	−3.3 (26.1)	1.5 (34.7)	−7.7 (18.1)
Daily mean °C (°F)	−0.7 (30.7)	−4.1 (24.6)	−8.3 (17.1)	−11.7 (10.9)	−14.6 (5.7)	−16.2 (2.8)	−17.5 (0.5)	−18.8 (−1.8)	−17.8 (0.0)	−13.6 (7.5)	−6.8 (19.8)	−1.6 (29.1)	−11.0 (12.2)
Mean daily minimum °C (°F)	−3.7 (25.3)	−6.9 (19.6)	−11.2 (11.8)	−14.5 (5.9)	−17.3 (0.9)	−19.3 (−2.7)	−20.8 (−5.4)	−22.4 (−8.3)	−21.3 (−6.3)	−17.2 (1.0)	−10.4 (13.3)	−4.7 (23.5)	−14.1 (6.6)
Average precipitation mm (inches)	7.2 (0.28)	18.5 (0.73)	51.9 (2.04)	71.0 (2.80)	66.6 (2.62)	52.2 (2.06)	60.2 (2.37)	58.4 (2.30)	48.0 (1.89)	38.6 (1.52)	24.8 (0.98)	8.2 (0.32)	505.6 (19.91)
Average relative humidity (%)	63.7	63.4	68.8	69.7	68.4	66.4	68.3	70.4	69.5	68.2	65.2	64.3	67.2
Source: Arctic and Antarctic Research Institute

== See also ==
Molodyozhnaya Ice Runway
- IATA: none; ICAO: AT15

Summary
- Airport type: Private
- Serves: Molodyozhnaya Station
- Location: Thala Hills
- Time zone: {{{timezone}}} (+3)
- Elevation AMSL: 753 ft (230 m)
- Coordinates: 67°40′58″S 46°08′05″E

Map
- Location of airfield in Antarctica

Runways
Direction	Length		Surface
Direction	ft	m	Surface
10/28	8,395	2,559	Ice

- History of Antarctica
- List of Antarctic expeditions
- List of Antarctic research stations
- List of Antarctic field camps
- Airports in Antarctica
- Soviet Antarctic Expedition
