= Thala Hills =

Coordinates: 67°39′S 45°58′E

The Thala Hills are low, rounded coastal hills between Freeth and Spooner Bays in Enderby Land, Antarctica. The hills were plotted from air photos taken by Antarctic Names Committee of Australia (ANCA) in 1956. They were named by ANCA for the ship Thala Dan, in which ANARE (Australian National Antarctic Research Expeditions) visited the hills in February 1961.
