= List of Swedish football transfers winter 2015–16 =

This is a list of Swedish football transfers in the winter transfer window 2015–16 by club.

Only transfers in and out between 8 January – 31 March 2016 of the Allsvenskan and Superettan are included.

== Allsvenskan ==
=== AIK ===
In: Note: Flags indicate national team as defined under FIFA eligibility rules; some limited exceptions apply. Players may hold more than one non-FIFA nationality.

No.	Pos.	Nation	Player
2	DF	FIN	Sauli Väisänen (loan return from HIFK)
10	FW	SWE	Denni Avdić (from AZ)
11	FW	FIN	Eero Markkanen (from RoPS)
19	MF	IRQ	Ahmed Yasin Ghani (from AGF)
21	DF	SWE	Daniel Sundgren (from Degerfors)
22	FW	SWE	Carlos Strandberg (on loan from CSKA Moscow)
31	MF	SWE	Christos Gravius (loan return from Vasalund)
39	MF	SWE	Amin Affane (from Arminia Bielefeld)

Out: Note: Flags indicate national team as defined under FIFA eligibility rules; some limited exceptions apply. Players may hold more than one non-FIFA nationality.

No.	Pos.	Nation	Player
10	FW	ERI	Henok Goitom (released)
14	MF	ENG	Kenny Pavey (released)
15	MF	ARG	Gabriel Ferreyra (loan return to Boca Juniors)
16	DF	BRA	Alex Pereira (loan return to AFC United)
23	FW	SLE	Mohamed Bangura (to Dalian Yifang)
—	DF	SWE	Alexander Hedman (to Sirius)
—	DF	SWE	Edward Owusu (to Piteå)

=== BK Häcken ===
In: Note: Flags indicate national team as defined under FIFA eligibility rules; some limited exceptions apply. Players may hold more than one non-FIFA nationality.

No.	Pos.	Nation	Player
—	DF	SWE	Niclas Andersén (from Ljungskile)
—	DF	GHA	Baba Mensah (on loan from Inter Allies)
—	MF	SWE	Albin Skoglund (Promoted)
—	FW	NGA	John Owoeri (from Åtvidaberg)

Out: Note: Flags indicate national team as defined under FIFA eligibility rules; some limited exceptions apply. Players may hold more than one non-FIFA nationality.

No.	Pos.	Nation	Player
6	MF	SWE	David Frölund (released)
8	MF	SWE	Ivo Pękalski (released)
13	MF	SWE	Sebastian Ohlsson (to Degerfors)
20	DF	SWE	Tom Söderberg (released)
31	FW	NED	Michiel Hemmen (released)
—	DF	SWE	Ronald Mukiibi (to Östersund)

=== Djurgårdens IF ===
In: Note: Flags indicate national team as defined under FIFA eligibility rules; some limited exceptions apply. Players may hold more than one non-FIFA nationality.

No.	Pos.	Nation	Player
4	DF	SWE	Jacob Une Larsson (from Brommapojkarna)
7	MF	KOR	Moon Seon-min (from Östersund)
14	MF	SWE	Besard Sabović (promoted)
19	DF	SWE	Marcus Hansson (from Tromsø)
21	MF	RSA	Mihlali Mayambela (from Cape Town All Stars)
24	FW	ZIM	Tino Kadewere (from Harare City)
—	MF	SWE	Tim Söderström (loan return from Jönköpings Södra)
—	DF	SWE	Jonathan Augustinsson (from Brommapojkarna)
—	FW	KEN	Michael Olunga (from Gor Mahia)
—	FW	SWE	Mathias Ranégie (on loan from Watford)

Out: Note: Flags indicate national team as defined under FIFA eligibility rules; some limited exceptions apply. Players may hold more than one non-FIFA nationality.

No.	Pos.	Nation	Player
2	DF	SWE	Jesper Arvidsson (to Vålerenga)
3	DF	SWE	Fredrik Stenman (released)
—	DF	SWE	Jakob Glasberg (to Frej)
—	MF	SWE	Tim Söderström (released)
13	DF	SWE	Emil Bergström (to Rubin Kazan)
19	MF	KOR	Yoon Soo-Yong (on loan to Assyriska)
—	FW	SWE	Sebastian Andersson (to IFK Norrköping)

=== Falkenbergs FF ===
In: Note: Flags indicate national team as defined under FIFA eligibility rules; some limited exceptions apply. Players may hold more than one non-FIFA nationality.

No.	Pos.	Nation	Player
17	FW	SWE	Jesper Karlsson (promoted)
20	FW	FIN	Akseli Pelvas (from SJK)
—	DF	DEN	Thomas Juel-Nielsen (from Sandefjord)

Out: Note: Flags indicate national team as defined under FIFA eligibility rules; some limited exceptions apply. Players may hold more than one non-FIFA nationality.

No.	Pos.	Nation	Player
6	MF	SWE	Rasums Andersson (released)
13	DF	SWE	Adam Eriksson (to Helsingborg)
19	MF	SWE	Johan Svahn (released)
20	MF	SWE	Calle Wede (to Helsingborg)
21	MF	NZL	Dan Keat (released)
24	GK	SWE	Johan Brattberg (on loan to Eskilsminne)

=== Gefle IF ===
In: Note: Flags indicate national team as defined under FIFA eligibility rules; some limited exceptions apply. Players may hold more than one non-FIFA nationality.

No.	Pos.	Nation	Player
2	DF	FRA	Joshua Nadeau (free agent)
3	MF	NOR	Simen Rafn (from Fredrikstad)
4	DF	SWE	Anton Lans (from Elfsborg)
8	MF	FIN	Simon Skrabb (on loan from Jaro)
22	GK	SWE	Andreas Andersson (from Sirius)

Out: Note: Flags indicate national team as defined under FIFA eligibility rules; some limited exceptions apply. Players may hold more than one non-FIFA nationality.

No.	Pos.	Nation	Player
2	DF	KOS	Ilir Berisha (released) (Note: "Truppförändringar i Gefle IF". Gefle IF.)
3	DF	SWE	Jonas Olsson (released)
4	DF	SWE	Anders Wikström (retired)
8	MF	SWE	Erik Olsson (released)
19	MF	SWE	Christoffer Aspgren (released)
22	GK	SWE	Sasa Sjanic (released)
23	DF	SWE	Mark da Silva Lindström (released)
25	GK	MNE	Zoran Aković (loan return to Husqvarna)
30	GK	SWE	Oskar Larsson (on loan to Egersunds)

=== GIF Sundsvall ===
In: Note: Flags indicate national team as defined under FIFA eligibility rules; some limited exceptions apply. Players may hold more than one non-FIFA nationality.

No.	Pos.	Nation	Player
5	DF	SWE	Eric Björkander (from Mjällby AIF)
16	MF	SWE	Robin Tranberg (from Varbergs BoIS)
—	MF	SWE	Amaro Bahtijar (from Ånge)
—	MF	ISL	Kristinn Steindórsson (from Columbus Crew)
—	FW	SWE	Stefan Silva (from Sirius)

Out: Note: Flags indicate national team as defined under FIFA eligibility rules; some limited exceptions apply. Players may hold more than one non-FIFA nationality.

No.	Pos.	Nation	Player
2	DF	SWE	Joakim Nilsson (to Elfsborg)
5	DF	ISL	Jón Guðni Fjóluson (to Norrköping)
7	MF	SWE	Daniel Sliper (released)
16	MF	SWE	Simon Helg (released)
25	DF	SWE	Robert Hammarstedt (released)
35	GK	SWE	Jonathan Malmberg (on loan to Levanger)
91	FW	SWE	Leo Englund (released)

=== Hammarby IF ===
In: Note: Flags indicate national team as defined under FIFA eligibility rules; some limited exceptions apply. Players may hold more than one non-FIFA nationality.

No.	Pos.	Nation	Player
6	MF	GHA	Joseph Aidoo (from Inter Allies)
7	FW	BRA	Alex (on loan from Resende)
11	MF	ISL	Arnór Smárason (from Helsingborg)
21	MF	SWE	Melker Hallberg (on loan from Udinese)

Out: Note: Flags indicate national team as defined under FIFA eligibility rules; some limited exceptions apply. Players may hold more than one non-FIFA nationality.

No.	Pos.	Nation	Player
11	FW	SWE	Pablo Piñones Arce (released)
15	MF	SWE	Viktor Nordin (released)
17	FW	SWE	Linus Hallenius (to Helsingborg)
21	DF	NOR	Jan Gunnar Solli (released)
22	MF	NOR	Lars Fuhre (released)

=== Helsingborgs IF ===
In: Note: Flags indicate national team as defined under FIFA eligibility rules; some limited exceptions apply. Players may hold more than one non-FIFA nationality.

No.	Pos.	Nation	Player
7	DF	SWE	Viktor Ljung (from Halmstad)
8	MF	DEN	Martin Christensen (free agent)
9	FW	ZIM	Matthew Rusike (from Halmstad) (Note: "HIF värvar Matthew Rusike". Helsingborgs IF. 19 January 2016.)
11	DF	SWE	Adam Eriksson (from Falkenberg)
15	FW	SWE	Linus Hallenius (to Hammarby)
20	MF	SWE	Calle Wede (from Falkenberg)
24	FW	SWE	Anton Kinnander (loan return from Motala)
31	MF	SWE	Elias Andersson (loan return from Varbergs BoIS)
41	GK	CAN	Tomer Chencinski (from RoPS)

Out: Note: Flags indicate national team as defined under FIFA eligibility rules; some limited exceptions apply. Players may hold more than one non-FIFA nationality.

No.	Pos.	Nation	Player
4	DF	SWE	Fredrik Widlund (released)
7	MF	SWE	Mattias Lindström (released)
9	FW	SWE	Robin Simović (to Nagoya Grampus)
11	MF	ISL	Arnór Smárason (to Hammarby)
20	FW	GHA	Emmanuel Boateng (to LA Galaxy)
21	FW	LBN	Mohamed Ramadan (to Rosengård)
22	FW	SWE	Rade Prica (to Maccabi Petah Tikva)
28	DF	FIN	Jere Uronen (to Genk)
30	GK	SWE	Pär Hansson (released)
32	DF	SWE	Gustav Jarl (to Assyriska)

=== IF Elfsborg ===
In: Note: Flags indicate national team as defined under FIFA eligibility rules; some limited exceptions apply. Players may hold more than one non-FIFA nationality.

No.	Pos.	Nation	Player
4	DF	DEN	Anders Randrup (from Vestsjælland)
5	DF	NOR	Jørgen Horn (from Strømsgodset)
12	DF	SWE	Joakim Nilsson (from GIF Sundsvall)
15	MF	SWE	Rasmus Rosenqvist (promoted)
22	FW	SWE	Viktor Prodell (from Mechelen)
27	MF	NOR	Thomas Kind Bendiksen (on loan from Molde)

Out: Note: Flags indicate national team as defined under FIFA eligibility rules; some limited exceptions apply. Players may hold more than one non-FIFA nationality.

No.	Pos.	Nation	Player
5	DF	SWE	Anton Lans (to Gefle)
8	MF	SWE	Anders Svensson (retired)
13	MF	SWE	Arber Zeneli (to Heerenveen)
15	DF	SWE	Andreas Klarström (retired)
20	FW	IRQ	Arjan Mostafa (released)
25	DF	NOR	Niklas Gunnarsson (loan return to Vålerenga)
—	DF	SWE	Sebastian Holmén (to Dynamo Moscow)

=== IFK Göteborg ===
In: Note: Flags indicate national team as defined under FIFA eligibility rules; some limited exceptions apply. Players may hold more than one non-FIFA nationality.

No.	Pos.	Nation	Player
10	FW	SWE	Tobias Hysén (from Shanghai SIPG)
21	DF	NOR	Benjamin Zalo (from Ørn-Horten)
25	GK	SWE	Erik Dahlin (from Oddevold)
26	FW	SWE	Patrick Karlsson Lagemyr (promoted)

Out: Note: Flags indicate national team as defined under FIFA eligibility rules; some limited exceptions apply. Players may hold more than one non-FIFA nationality.

No.	Pos.	Nation	Player
10	FW	FIN	Riku Riski (loan return to Rosenborg)
12	GK	SWE	Marcus Sandberg (to Vålerenga)
13	MF	SWE	Gustav Svensson (to Guangzhou R&F)
23	DF	SWE	Patrick Dyrestam (on loan to Ängelholm)
26	MF	SWE	Karl Bohm (released)
—	FW	SWE	Victor Edvardsen (released)
—	FW	SEN	Malick Mané (released)

=== IFK Norrköping ===
In: Note: Flags indicate national team as defined under FIFA eligibility rules; some limited exceptions apply. Players may hold more than one non-FIFA nationality.

No.	Pos.	Nation	Player
—	DF	ISL	Jón Guðni Fjóluson (from GIF Sundsvall)
—	FW	SWE	Sebastian Andersson (from Djurgården)

Out: Note: Flags indicate national team as defined under FIFA eligibility rules; some limited exceptions apply. Players may hold more than one non-FIFA nationality.

No.	Pos.	Nation	Player
8	MF	IRQ	Rawez Lawan (released)
23	DF	SWE	David Boo Wiklander (released)
26	DF	SWE	Adnan Kojić (released)
29	GK	SWE	Edvard Setterberg (to Nyköpings BIS)

=== Jönköpings Södra IF ===
In: Note: Flags indicate national team as defined under FIFA eligibility rules; some limited exceptions apply. Players may hold more than one non-FIFA nationality.

No.	Pos.	Nation	Player
—	DF	SWE	Amer Eriksson Ibragic (loan return from Husqvarna)
—	MF	SWE	Adam Fägerhag (from Tibro)
—	MF	SWE	Dzenis Kozica (from Värnamo)
—	MF	NGA	Moses Ogbu (from Sirius)
—	FW	POL	Paweł Cibicki (on loan from Malmö FF)
—	FW	NOR	Johan Gulliksen (from Fram Larvik)
—	FW	RUS	Kirill Laptov (loan return from Husqvarna)

Out: Note: Flags indicate national team as defined under FIFA eligibility rules; some limited exceptions apply. Players may hold more than one non-FIFA nationality.

No.	Pos.	Nation	Player
6	FW	SWE	Fredrik Olsson (to Halmstad)
7	MF	SWE	Ronny Sabo (to Degerfors)
10	MF	SWE	Tim Söderström (loan return to Djurgården)

=== Kalmar FF ===
In: Note: Flags indicate national team as defined under FIFA eligibility rules; some limited exceptions apply. Players may hold more than one non-FIFA nationality.

No.	Pos.	Nation	Player
3	DF	SWE	Sebastian Starke Hedlund (from GAIS)
12	FW	UGA	Lumala Abdu (from Mjällby AIF)
—	DF	CHI	Marko Biskupović (from CD Universidad Católica)

Out: Note: Flags indicate national team as defined under FIFA eligibility rules; some limited exceptions apply. Players may hold more than one non-FIFA nationality.

No.	Pos.	Nation	Player
4	DF	SWE	Ludvig Öhman (to Nagoya Grampus)
18	MF	NOR	Tor Øyvind Hovda (to Sarpsborg 08)
22	DF	SWE	Måns Olström (on loan to Oskarshamn)
25	MF	SWE	Peter Westberg (released)
77	GK	NOR	Lars Cramer (to Aalesund)
80	DF	SRB	Nenad Đorđević (to Berga)
—	DF	SWE	Pontus Fredriksson (on loan to Oskarshamn)

=== Malmö FF ===
In: Note: Flags indicate national team as defined under FIFA eligibility rules; some limited exceptions apply. Players may hold more than one non-FIFA nationality.

No.	Pos.	Nation	Player
7	MF	DEN	Anders Christiansen (from Chievo Verona)
24	FW	ISL	Viðar Örn Kjartansson (from Jiangsu Sainty)
33	FW	SWE	Teddy Bergqvist (promoted)

Out: Note: Flags indicate national team as defined under FIFA eligibility rules; some limited exceptions apply. Players may hold more than one non-FIFA nationality.

No.	Pos.	Nation	Player
7	MF	SWE	Simon Kroon (to SønderjyskE) (Note: "Simon Kroon lämnar MFF". Malmö FF. 21 December 2015.)
11	FW	ALB	Agon Mehmeti (to Stabæk)
15	FW	POL	Paweł Cibicki (on loan to Jönköpings Södra IF)
18	MF	SWE	Petar Petrović (released)
27	GK	SWE	Zlatan Azinović (on loan to Ängelholms FF)
34	DF	SWE	Alexander Blomqvist (to Trelleborg)

=== Örebro SK ===
In: Note: Flags indicate national team as defined under FIFA eligibility rules; some limited exceptions apply. Players may hold more than one non-FIFA nationality.

No.	Pos.	Nation	Player
3	DF	USA	Brendan Hines-Ike (from South Florida Bulls)
23	FW	SWE	Maic Sema (free agent)

Out: Note: Flags indicate national team as defined under FIFA eligibility rules; some limited exceptions apply. Players may hold more than one non-FIFA nationality.

No.	Pos.	Nation	Player
—	MF	SWE	Lukman Murad (released)
—	FW	FRA	Mozart Surville (released)

=== Östersunds FK ===
In: Note: Flags indicate national team as defined under FIFA eligibility rules; some limited exceptions apply. Players may hold more than one non-FIFA nationality.

No.	Pos.	Nation	Player
—	DF	ETH	Walid Atta (free agent)
—	DF	SWE	Ronald Mukiibi (from Häcken)
—	DF	SWE	Gabriel Somi (from Syrianska)
—	FW	SWE	Saman Ghoddos (from Syrianska)

Out: Note: Flags indicate national team as defined under FIFA eligibility rules; some limited exceptions apply. Players may hold more than one non-FIFA nationality.

No.	Pos.	Nation	Player
3	DF	KOS	Kujtim Bala (to Sirius)
15	FW	BIH	Dragan Kapčević (to Sirius)
20	DF	SWE	Jonathan Azulay (to Degerfors)
—	MF	KOR	Moon Seon-min (to Djurgården)
—	FW	ENG	Taylor Morgan (to Tulsa Roughnecks)

== Superettan ==
=== AFC United ===
In: Note: Flags indicate national team as defined under FIFA eligibility rules; some limited exceptions apply. Players may hold more than one non-FIFA nationality.

No.	Pos.	Nation	Player
3	DF	ENG	Jernade Meade (from St Albans Cuty)
4	DF	SWE	Daniel Jarl (free agent)
5	DF	GHA	John Mensah (free agent)
6	DF	SWE	Michael Termanini (Promoted)
7	MF	SWE	Ferid Ali (from Vasalund)
9	FW	SWE	Sasa Matic (from Huddinge)
14	FW	USA	Tristan Bowen (from KuPS)
21	MF	SWE	Carlos Gaete Moggia (from Värnamo)
25	MF	CIV	Abdul Razak (free agent)
85	DF	SWE	Isa Demir (free agent)
91	DF	SWE	Erik Figueroa (free agent)
—	DF	BRA	Alex Pereira (loan return from AIK)

Out: Note: Flags indicate national team as defined under FIFA eligibility rules; some limited exceptions apply. Players may hold more than one non-FIFA nationality.

No.	Pos.	Nation	Player
4	DF	ENG	Korede Aiyegbusi (to Siah Jamegan)
—	DF	BRA	Alex Pereira (to Assyriska)

=== Assyriska FF ===
In: Note: Flags indicate national team as defined under FIFA eligibility rules; some limited exceptions apply. Players may hold more than one non-FIFA nationality.

No.	Pos.	Nation	Player
2	DF	FRA	Mamadou Wague (from Najran)
3	DF	SWE	Simon Strand (from Huddinge)
7	MF	ENG	Kenny Pavey (free agent)
8	MF	SWE	Daniel Sliper (free agent)
9	FW	SWE	Tim Söderström (free agent)
11	MF	KOR	Yoon Soo-Yong (on loan from Djurgården)
13	DF	SWE	Gustav Jarl (from Helsingborg)
14	FW	SWE	Jerome Ugwo (Promoted)
16	DF	BRA	Alex Pereira (from AFC United)
17	MF	SWE	Gino Berg (Promoted)
19	FW	SWE	Ken Fagerberg (free agent)
22	MF	NGA	Ugonna Anyora (free agent)

Out: Note: Flags indicate national team as defined under FIFA eligibility rules; some limited exceptions apply. Players may hold more than one non-FIFA nationality.

No.	Pos.	Nation	Player
7	MF	SWE	Alexander Nilsson (to Sirius)
13	DF	SWE	Isa Demir (released)
88	DF	SWE	Kyle Konwea (to Siah Jamegan)
—	MF	SWE	Christopher Brandeborn (released)

=== Dalkurd FF ===
In: Note: Flags indicate national team as defined under FIFA eligibility rules; some limited exceptions apply. Players may hold more than one non-FIFA nationality.

No.	Pos.	Nation	Player

Out: Note: Flags indicate national team as defined under FIFA eligibility rules; some limited exceptions apply. Players may hold more than one non-FIFA nationality.

No.	Pos.	Nation	Player

=== Degerfors IF ===
In: Note: Flags indicate national team as defined under FIFA eligibility rules; some limited exceptions apply. Players may hold more than one non-FIFA nationality.

No.	Pos.	Nation	Player
1	GK	FIN	Jesse Öst (from Jaro)
2	DF	SWE	Jonathan Azulay (from Östersund)
6	FW	NOR	Magnus Solum (from Kongsvinger)
7	MF	SWE	Ronny Sabo (from Jönköpings Södra)
15	MF	SWE	Sebastian Ohlsson (from Häcken)
18	MF	SWE	Amor Layouni (from Brage)

Out: Note: Flags indicate national team as defined under FIFA eligibility rules; some limited exceptions apply. Players may hold more than one non-FIFA nationality.

No.	Pos.	Nation	Player
1	GK	SWE	August Strömberg (to Ljungskile)
7	FW	SWE	Simon Molander (to Carlstad United)
20	DF	SWE	Daniel Djurić (released)
21	DF	SWE	Daniel Sundgren (to AIK)

=== GAIS ===
In: Note: Flags indicate national team as defined under FIFA eligibility rules; some limited exceptions apply. Players may hold more than one non-FIFA nationality.

No.	Pos.	Nation	Player
—	GK	SWE	Jesper Johansson (from Mjällby AIF)
—	DF	SWE	Carl Nyström (free agent)
—	DF	NZL	Steven Old (from Ljungskile)
—	DF	ENG	James Sinclair (free agent)
—	MF	NZL	Craig Henderson (free agent)
—	FW	SWE	David Johanneson (from Varbergs BoIS)

Out: Note: Flags indicate national team as defined under FIFA eligibility rules; some limited exceptions apply. Players may hold more than one non-FIFA nationality.

No.	Pos.	Nation	Player
3	DF	SWE	David Björkeryd (released)
4	MF	GHA	Yussif Chibsah (released)
6	DF	SWE	Calle Svensson (released)
16	DF	SWE	Sebastian Starke Hedlund (to Kalmar)
19	FW	SWE	Bryan Johansson (released)
28	DF	SWE	Stefan Djurović (released)
29	DF	SWE	Tahir Kocak (released)

=== Halmstads BK ===
In: Note: Flags indicate national team as defined under FIFA eligibility rules; some limited exceptions apply. Players may hold more than one non-FIFA nationality.

No.	Pos.	Nation	Player
—	DF	SWE	Adnan Kojić (free agent)
—	FW	SWE	Fredrik Olsson (from Jönköpings Södra)
—	FW	NOR	Alexander Ruud Tveter (from Follo)

Out: Note: Flags indicate national team as defined under FIFA eligibility rules; some limited exceptions apply. Players may hold more than one non-FIFA nationality.

No.	Pos.	Nation	Player
2	DF	SWE	Viktor Ljung (to Helsingborg)
18	FW	SWE	Shkodran Maholli (to Åtvidaberg)
19	MF	NOR	Snorre Krogsgård (released)
23	FW	ZIM	Matthew Rusike (to Helsingborg) (Note: "HIF värvar Matthew Rusike". Helsingborgs IF. 19 January 2016.)
—	MF	GHA	Kwame Karikari (to Haugesund)

=== IFK Värnamo ===
In: Note: Flags indicate national team as defined under FIFA eligibility rules; some limited exceptions apply. Players may hold more than one non-FIFA nationality.

No.	Pos.	Nation	Player
—	GK	SWE	Jonathan Rasheed (from Follo)
—	MF	SWE	Adnan Kulovac (promoted)
—	FW	SWE	Dido Hussain (from Bollnäs)
—	FW	SWE	Viktor Palmquist (promoted)

Out: Note: Flags indicate national team as defined under FIFA eligibility rules; some limited exceptions apply. Players may hold more than one non-FIFA nationality.

No.	Pos.	Nation	Player
7	MF	SWE	Dzenis Kozica (to Jönköpings Södra)
8	MF	SWE	Carlos Gaete Moggia (to AFC United)

=== IK Frej ===
In: Note: Flags indicate national team as defined under FIFA eligibility rules; some limited exceptions apply. Players may hold more than one non-FIFA nationality.

No.	Pos.	Nation	Player
—	DF	SWE	Jakob Glasberg (from Djurgården)
—	MF	SWE	Dida Rashidi (from Nacka)

Out: Note: Flags indicate national team as defined under FIFA eligibility rules; some limited exceptions apply. Players may hold more than one non-FIFA nationality.

No.	Pos.	Nation	Player
9	FW	CAN	Saša Plavšić (released)
16	MF	SWE	Joakim Blomquist (released)
23	MF	SWE	William Celsing (released)

=== IK Sirius ===
In: Note: Flags indicate national team as defined under FIFA eligibility rules; some limited exceptions apply. Players may hold more than one non-FIFA nationality.

No.	Pos.	Nation	Player
—	GK	SWE	Benny Lekström (from Tromsø)
—	DF	KOS	Kujtim Bala (from Östersund)
—	DF	SWE	Alexander Hedman (from AIK)
—	MF	SWE	Karvan Ahmadi (promoted)
—	MF	SWE	Alexander Nilsson (from Assyriska)
—	FW	BIH	Dragan Kapčević (from Östersund)

Out: Note: Flags indicate national team as defined under FIFA eligibility rules; some limited exceptions apply. Players may hold more than one non-FIFA nationality.

No.	Pos.	Nation	Player
1	GK	SWE	Andreas Andersson (to Gefle)
10	FW	SWE	Stefan Silva (to GIF Sundsvall)
20	MF	NGA	Moses Ogbu (to Jönköpings Södra)
33	DF	SWE	Erik Figueroa (released)

=== Ljungskile SK ===
In: Note: Flags indicate national team as defined under FIFA eligibility rules; some limited exceptions apply. Players may hold more than one non-FIFA nationality.

No.	Pos.	Nation	Player
—	GK	SWE	August Strömberg (from Degerfors)
—	FW	NOR	Tim André Nilsen (from Mjøndalen)
—	FW	NGA	Ahmed Suleiman (free agent)

Out: Note: Flags indicate national team as defined under FIFA eligibility rules; some limited exceptions apply. Players may hold more than one non-FIFA nationality.

No.	Pos.	Nation	Player
2	DF	NZL	Steven Old (to GAIS)
3	DF	SWE	Niclas Andersén (to Häcken)
10	MF	SWE	Jonas Lindberg (to Sarpsborg 08)

=== Syrianska FC ===
In: Note: Flags indicate national team as defined under FIFA eligibility rules; some limited exceptions apply. Players may hold more than one non-FIFA nationality.

No.	Pos.	Nation	Player

Out: Note: Flags indicate national team as defined under FIFA eligibility rules; some limited exceptions apply. Players may hold more than one non-FIFA nationality.

No.	Pos.	Nation	Player
7	FW	SWE	Saman Ghoddos (to Östersund)
14	MF	SWE	Durim Berisha (released)
20	DF	SWE	Gabriel Somi (to Östersund)
99	MF	SWE	Besim Kunić (released)

=== Trelleborgs FF ===
In: Note: Flags indicate national team as defined under FIFA eligibility rules; some limited exceptions apply. Players may hold more than one non-FIFA nationality.

No.	Pos.	Nation	Player
—	DF	SWE	Alexander Blomqvist (from Malmö)
—	DF	SWE	Anton Tideman (from Varbergs BoIS)
—	MF	SWE	Mattias Håkansson (from Mjällby AIF)

Out: Note: Flags indicate national team as defined under FIFA eligibility rules; some limited exceptions apply. Players may hold more than one non-FIFA nationality.

No.	Pos.	Nation	Player

=== Varbergs BoIS ===
In: Note: Flags indicate national team as defined under FIFA eligibility rules; some limited exceptions apply. Players may hold more than one non-FIFA nationality.

No.	Pos.	Nation	Player
—	DF	SWE	Eric Nilsson (from Elfsborg U-21)
—	DF	NOR	Ivan Näsberg (on loan from Vålerenga)
—	MF	SWE	Sebastian Crona (from Halmia)
—	FW	NOR	Riki Alba (on loan from Vålerenga)
—	FW	SWE	Anton Sandberg Magnusson (loan return from Örgryte)

Out: Note: Flags indicate national team as defined under FIFA eligibility rules; some limited exceptions apply. Players may hold more than one non-FIFA nationality.

No.	Pos.	Nation	Player
5	DF	SWE	Anton Tideman (to Trelleborg)
6	MF	SWE	Elias Andersson (loan return to Helsingborg)
11	MF	SWE	Robin Tranberg (to GIF Sundsvall)
17	MF	NOR	Mats André Kaland (to Fredrikstad)
19	FW	SWE	David Johanneson (to GAIS)

=== Åtvidabergs FF ===
In: Note: Flags indicate national team as defined under FIFA eligibility rules; some limited exceptions apply. Players may hold more than one non-FIFA nationality.

No.	Pos.	Nation	Player
—	DF	SWE	Jon Birkfeldt (from HIF Akademi)
—	MF	SWE	Jonathan Asp (from Höllviken)
—	MF	SWE	Alberto Catenacci (from Brommapojkarna)
—	MF	SWE	Joakim Juhlin (from Värmbol)
—	FW	SWE	Simon Alexandersson (from Vimmerby)
—	FW	PLE	Mahmoud Eid (from Nyköpings BIS)
—	FW	SWE	Shkodran Maholli (from Halmstad)

Out: Note: Flags indicate national team as defined under FIFA eligibility rules; some limited exceptions apply. Players may hold more than one non-FIFA nationality.

No.	Pos.	Nation	Player
1	GK	SWE	Henrik Gustavsson (retired)
4	DF	SWE	Andreas Dahlén (retired)
5	DF	SWE	Daniel Hallingström (retired)
8	DF	SWE	Petter Gustafsson (released)
19	FW	NGA	John Owoeri (to Häcken)
32	MF	DEN	Martin Christensen (released)

=== Ängelholms FF ===
In: Note: Flags indicate national team as defined under FIFA eligibility rules; some limited exceptions apply. Players may hold more than one non-FIFA nationality.

No.	Pos.	Nation	Player
—	DF	SWE	Patrick Dyrestam (on loan from Göteborg)
—	MF	SWE	Philip Bernholtz (from Husqvarna)

Out: Note: Flags indicate national team as defined under FIFA eligibility rules; some limited exceptions apply. Players may hold more than one non-FIFA nationality.

No.	Pos.	Nation	Player
18	MF	SWE	Robert Mirosavić (to Högaborg)

=== Örgryte IS ===
In: Note: Flags indicate national team as defined under FIFA eligibility rules; some limited exceptions apply. Players may hold more than one non-FIFA nationality.

No.	Pos.	Nation	Player
—	DF	SWE	Joakim Hall (from Qviding)
—	DF	SWE	David Johansson (from Utsikten)
—	MF	SWE	Andreas Berndtsson (promoted)
—	MF	SWE	Rasmus Andernil Bozic (from BK Häcken U-19)

Out: Note: Flags indicate national team as defined under FIFA eligibility rules; some limited exceptions apply. Players may hold more than one non-FIFA nationality.

No.	Pos.	Nation	Player
2	DF	SWE	Robin Ingvarsson (to BK Forward)
13	FW	SWE	Johan Hedman (released)
19	MF	SWE	André Nillson (on loan to Holmalund)
21	DF	SWE	Adam Rosén (to Utsikten)
22	FW	SWE	Henrik Carlsson (released)
25	FW	SWE	Anton Sandberg Magnusson (loan return to Varbergs BoIS)
88	FW	SWE	Stellan Carlsson (released)
