= List of Swedish football transfers winter 2016–17 =

This is a list of Swedish football transfers in the winter transfer window 2016–17 by club.

Only transfers in and out between 8 January – 31 March 2017 of the Allsvenskan and Superettan are included.

== Allsvenskan ==
=== AFC Eskilstuna ===
In: Note: Flags indicate national team as defined under FIFA eligibility rules; some limited exceptions apply. Players may hold more than one non-FIFA nationality.

No.	Pos.	Nation	Player
1	GK	SWE	Tim Erlandsson (on loan from (England) Nottingham Forest)
2	DF	SWE	Daniel Björnquist (from (Sweden) Örebro)
4	DF	SWE	Ludvig Öhman (from (Japan) Nagoya Grampus)
5	DF	SWE	Gustav Jarl (from (Sweden) Assyriska)
13	MF	AUT	Thomas Piermayr (from (Hungary) Békéscsaba)
14	MF	SWE	Mauricio Albornoz (from (Sweden) Åtvidaberg)
18	FW	TAN	Thomas Ulimwengu (from (Democratic Republic of the Congo) TP Mazembe)
20	MF	GHA	Emmanuel Frimpong (from (Russia) Arsenal Tula)
21	MF	KOS	Anel Raskaj (free agent)
22	DF	SWE	Alexander Michel (from (Sweden) Syrianska)
88	GK	IRN	Alireza Haghighi (free agent)
—	DF	GEO	Zurab Tsiskaridze (from (Czech Republic) Teplice)

Out: Note: Flags indicate national team as defined under FIFA eligibility rules; some limited exceptions apply. Players may hold more than one non-FIFA nationality.

No.	Pos.	Nation	Player
1	GK	SWE	Davor Blažević (to (Sweden) Assyriska)
4	DF	SWE	Daniel Jarl (to (Sweden) Sirius)
6	MF	SWE	Filip Rogic (to (Sweden) Örebro)
21	MF	SWE	Carlos Gaete Moggia (to (Norway) Elverum)
31	GK	USA	Josh Wicks (to (Sweden) Sirius)
85	DF	SWE	Isa Demir (released)
91	DF	SWE	Erik Figueroa (to (Sweden) Brommapojkarna)

=== AIK ===
In: Note: Flags indicate national team as defined under FIFA eligibility rules; some limited exceptions apply. Players may hold more than one non-FIFA nationality.

No.	Pos.	Nation	Player
6	MF	SWE	Simon Thern (on loan from (Netherlands) Heerenveen)
7	MF	SWE	Kristoffer Olsson (from (Denmark) Midtjylland)
9	FW	BIH	Sulejman Krpić (from (Bosnia and Herzegovina) Sloboda Tuzla)
14	DF	CRO	Stipe Vrdoljak (on loan from (Croatia) Novigrad)
36	FW	ERI	Henok Goitom (free agent)

Out: Note: Flags indicate national team as defined under FIFA eligibility rules; some limited exceptions apply. Players may hold more than one non-FIFA nationality.

No.	Pos.	Nation	Player
7	FW	NGA	Chinedu Obasi (to (China) Shenzhen)
17	MF	GHA	Ebenezer Ofori (to (Germany) VfB Stuttgart)
19	MF	IRQ	Ahmed Yasin Ghani (on loan to (Qatar) Muaither)
26	DF	NED	Jos Hooiveld (released)
31	MF	SWE	Christos Gravius (on loan to (Sweden) Jönköpings Södra)
32	DF	GHA	Patrick Kpozo (on loan to (Norway) Tromsø)
36	FW	SWE	Alexander Isak (to (Germany) Borussia Dortmund)

=== BK Häcken ===
In: Note: Flags indicate national team as defined under FIFA eligibility rules; some limited exceptions apply. Players may hold more than one non-FIFA nationality.

No.	Pos.	Nation	Player
4	DF	FIN	Juhani Ojala (from (Finland) SJK)
6	MF	SWE	Alexander Faltsetas (from (Sweden) Djurgården)
8	MF	SWE	Erik Friberg (free agent)
14	DF	SWE	Jakob Lindström (from (Sweden) Örgryte)
18	FW	SWE	Shkodran Maholli (from (Sweden) Åtvidaberg)
22	FW	NGA	Chisom Egbuchulam (on loan from (Nigeria) Enugu Rangers)
23	DF	SWE	David Engström (from (Sweden) Värnamo)
29	GK	NOR	Jonathan Rasheed (from (Sweden) Värnamo)

Out: Note: Flags indicate national team as defined under FIFA eligibility rules; some limited exceptions apply. Players may hold more than one non-FIFA nationality.

No.	Pos.	Nation	Player
29	GK	SWE	Alexander Nadj (released)
—	DF	SWE	Niclas Andersén (to (Sweden) GAIS)
—	MF	GAM	Demba Savage (to (Finland) HJK)
—	MF	FIN	Rasmus Schüller (to (United States) Minnesota United)
—	MF	NED	Niels Vorthoren (to (Norway) Start)
—	FW	NGA	John Owoeri (to (China) Baoding Yingli ETS)

=== Djurgårdens IF ===
In: Note: Flags indicate national team as defined under FIFA eligibility rules; some limited exceptions apply. Players may hold more than one non-FIFA nationality.

No.	Pos.	Nation	Player
13	DF	SWE	Jonas Olsson (from (England) West Bromwich Albion)
15	FW	CIV	Souleymane Kone (from (Armenia) FC Ararat Yerevan)
16	MF	SWE	Kim Källström (from (Switzerland) Grasshoppers)
17	FW	SWE	Gustav Engvall (on loan from (England) Bristol City)
20	FW	SEN	Aliou Badji (from (Senegal) Casa Sports)
22	FW	SWE	Felix Beijmo (from (Sweden) IF Brommapojkarna)
29	FW	NGA	Haruna Garba (from (United Arab Emirates) Dubai CSC)
30	FW	SWE	Tommi Vaiho (from (Sweden) GAIS)

Out: Note: Flags indicate national team as defined under FIFA eligibility rules; some limited exceptions apply. Players may hold more than one non-FIFA nationality.

No.	Pos.	Nation	Player
2	DF	SWE	Tim Björkström (on loan to (Sweden) Östersunds FK)
6	MF	SWE	Alexander Faltsetas (to (Sweden) BK Häcken)
7	MF	KOR	Moon Seon-min (to (South Korea) Incheon United)
10	MF	NOR	Daniel Berntsen (to (Norway) Vålerenga IF)
12	GK	NOR	Kenneth Høie (retired)
13	FW	SWE	Mathias Ranégie (loan return to (England) Watford)
14	MF	SWE	Besard Sabovic (on loan to (Sweden) Brommapojkarna)
17	FW	KEN	Michael Olunga (to (China) Guizhou Hengfeng Zhicheng)
23	GK	SWE	Hampus Nilsson (to (Sweden) Falkenbergs FF)
21	MF	RSA	Mihlali Mayambela (on loan to (Sweden) Degerfors IF)
27	DF	GAM	Kebba Ceesay (to (Sweden) Dalkurd)
31	DF	SWE	Kevin Deeromram (to (Thailand) Ratchaburi Mitr Phol)
31	DF	SWE	Marcus Enström (on loan to (Sweden) Vasalund)

=== GIF Sundsvall ===
In: Note: Flags indicate national team as defined under FIFA eligibility rules; some limited exceptions apply. Players may hold more than one non-FIFA nationality.

No.	Pos.	Nation	Player
2	DF	FIN	Juho Pirttijoki (from (Finland) HIFK)
9	FW	SWE	Linus Hallenius (from (Sweden) Helsingborg)
20	GK	SWE	William Eskelinen (from (Sweden) Hammarby)
23	MF	SWE	Jaudet Salih (from (Sweden) Haninge)
27	MF	USA	Romain Gall (from (Sweden) Nyköpings BIS)

Out: Note: Flags indicate national team as defined under FIFA eligibility rules; some limited exceptions apply. Players may hold more than one non-FIFA nationality.

No.	Pos.	Nation	Player
1	GK	ENG	Lloyd Saxton (on loan to (Norway) Levanger)

=== Halmstads BK ===
In: Note: Flags indicate national team as defined under FIFA eligibility rules; some limited exceptions apply. Players may hold more than one non-FIFA nationality.

No.	Pos.	Nation	Player

Out: Note: Flags indicate national team as defined under FIFA eligibility rules; some limited exceptions apply. Players may hold more than one non-FIFA nationality.

No.	Pos.	Nation	Player

=== Hammarby IF ===
In: Note: Flags indicate national team as defined under FIFA eligibility rules; some limited exceptions apply. Players may hold more than one non-FIFA nationality.

No.	Pos.	Nation	Player

Out: Note: Flags indicate national team as defined under FIFA eligibility rules; some limited exceptions apply. Players may hold more than one non-FIFA nationality.

No.	Pos.	Nation	Player
24	GK	SWE	William Eskelinen (to (Sweden) GIF Sundsvall)

=== IF Elfsborg ===
In: Note: Flags indicate national team as defined under FIFA eligibility rules; some limited exceptions apply. Players may hold more than one non-FIFA nationality.

No.	Pos.	Nation	Player

Out: Note: Flags indicate national team as defined under FIFA eligibility rules; some limited exceptions apply. Players may hold more than one non-FIFA nationality.

No.	Pos.	Nation	Player
—	MF	NOR	Henning Hauger (to (Norway) Strømsgodset)

=== IFK Göteborg ===
In: Note: Flags indicate national team as defined under FIFA eligibility rules; some limited exceptions apply. Players may hold more than one non-FIFA nationality.

No.	Pos.	Nation	Player
—	FW	ISL	Elías Már Ómarsson (from (Norway) Vålerenga, previously on loan)

Out: Note: Flags indicate national team as defined under FIFA eligibility rules; some limited exceptions apply. Players may hold more than one non-FIFA nationality.

No.	Pos.	Nation	Player

=== IFK Norrköping ===
In: Note: Flags indicate national team as defined under FIFA eligibility rules; some limited exceptions apply. Players may hold more than one non-FIFA nationality.

No.	Pos.	Nation	Player
—	MF	ISL	Guðmundur Þórarinsson (from (Norway) Rosenborg)

Out: Note: Flags indicate national team as defined under FIFA eligibility rules; some limited exceptions apply. Players may hold more than one non-FIFA nationality.

No.	Pos.	Nation	Player

=== IK Sirius ===
In: Note: Flags indicate national team as defined under FIFA eligibility rules; some limited exceptions apply. Players may hold more than one non-FIFA nationality.

No.	Pos.	Nation	Player
5	DF	SWE	Daniel Jarl (from (Sweden) Eskilstuna)
31	GK	USA	Josh Wicks (from (Sweden) Eskilstuna)

Out: Note: Flags indicate national team as defined under FIFA eligibility rules; some limited exceptions apply. Players may hold more than one non-FIFA nationality.

No.	Pos.	Nation	Player

=== Jönköpings Södra IF ===
In: Note: Flags indicate national team as defined under FIFA eligibility rules; some limited exceptions apply. Players may hold more than one non-FIFA nationality.

No.	Pos.	Nation	Player
11	FW	ISL	Árni Vilhjálmsson (from (Norway) Lillestrøm)
—	MF	SWE	Christos Gravius (on loan from (Sweden) AIK)

Out: Note: Flags indicate national team as defined under FIFA eligibility rules; some limited exceptions apply. Players may hold more than one non-FIFA nationality.

No.	Pos.	Nation	Player
—	FW	SWE	Pär Ericsson (to (Norway) Kongsvinger)

=== Kalmar FF ===
In: Note: Flags indicate national team as defined under FIFA eligibility rules; some limited exceptions apply. Players may hold more than one non-FIFA nationality.

No.	Pos.	Nation	Player

Out: Note: Flags indicate national team as defined under FIFA eligibility rules; some limited exceptions apply. Players may hold more than one non-FIFA nationality.

No.	Pos.	Nation	Player

=== Malmö FF ===
In: Note: Flags indicate national team as defined under FIFA eligibility rules; some limited exceptions apply. Players may hold more than one non-FIFA nationality.

No.	Pos.	Nation	Player

Out: Note: Flags indicate national team as defined under FIFA eligibility rules; some limited exceptions apply. Players may hold more than one non-FIFA nationality.

No.	Pos.	Nation	Player

=== Örebro SK ===
In: Note: Flags indicate national team as defined under FIFA eligibility rules; some limited exceptions apply. Players may hold more than one non-FIFA nationality.

No.	Pos.	Nation	Player
20	MF	SWE	Filip Rogic (from (Sweden) Eskilstuna)

Out: Note: Flags indicate national team as defined under FIFA eligibility rules; some limited exceptions apply. Players may hold more than one non-FIFA nationality.

No.	Pos.	Nation	Player
—	DF	SWE	Daniel Björnquist (to (Sweden) Eskilstuna)
—	MF	SWE	Martin Broberg (to (Norway) Odd)

=== Östersunds FK ===
In: Note: Flags indicate national team as defined under FIFA eligibility rules; some limited exceptions apply. Players may hold more than one non-FIFA nationality.

No.	Pos.	Nation	Player
—	DF	SWE	Tim Björkström (on loan from (Sweden) Djurgårdens IF)

Out: Note: Flags indicate national team as defined under FIFA eligibility rules; some limited exceptions apply. Players may hold more than one non-FIFA nationality.

No.	Pos.	Nation	Player

== Superettan ==
=== Dalkurd FF ===
In: Note: Flags indicate national team as defined under FIFA eligibility rules; some limited exceptions apply. Players may hold more than one non-FIFA nationality.

No.	Pos.	Nation	Player
3	DF	GAM	Kebba Ceesay (from (Sweden) Djurgårdens IF)

Out: Note: Flags indicate national team as defined under FIFA eligibility rules; some limited exceptions apply. Players may hold more than one non-FIFA nationality.

No.	Pos.	Nation	Player

=== Degerfors IF ===
In: Note: Flags indicate national team as defined under FIFA eligibility rules; some limited exceptions apply. Players may hold more than one non-FIFA nationality.

No.	Pos.	Nation	Player
—	MF	RSA	Mihlali Mayambela (on loan from (Sweden) Djurgårdens IF)

Out: Note: Flags indicate national team as defined under FIFA eligibility rules; some limited exceptions apply. Players may hold more than one non-FIFA nationality.

No.	Pos.	Nation	Player
—	FW	SWE	Amor Layonui (to (Norway) Elverum)

=== IF Brommapojkarna ===
In: Note: Flags indicate national team as defined under FIFA eligibility rules; some limited exceptions apply. Players may hold more than one non-FIFA nationality.

No.	Pos.	Nation	Player
23	DF	SWE	Erik Figueroa (from (Sweden) Eskilstuna)
—	MF	SWE	Besard Sabovic (on loan from (Sweden) Djurgårdens IF)

Out: Note: Flags indicate national team as defined under FIFA eligibility rules; some limited exceptions apply. Players may hold more than one non-FIFA nationality.

No.	Pos.	Nation	Player
22	FW	SWE	Felix Beijmo (to (Sweden) Djurgårdens IF)

=== Falkenbergs FF ===
In: Note: Flags indicate national team as defined under FIFA eligibility rules; some limited exceptions apply. Players may hold more than one non-FIFA nationality.

No.	Pos.	Nation	Player
—	GK	SWE	Hampus Nilsson (from (Sweden) Djurgårdens IF)

Out: Note: Flags indicate national team as defined under FIFA eligibility rules; some limited exceptions apply. Players may hold more than one non-FIFA nationality.

No.	Pos.	Nation	Player

=== IK Frej ===
In: Note: Flags indicate national team as defined under FIFA eligibility rules; some limited exceptions apply. Players may hold more than one non-FIFA nationality.

No.	Pos.	Nation	Player
—	DF	SWE	Martin Falkeborn (on loan from (Norway) Lillestrøm)

Out: Note: Flags indicate national team as defined under FIFA eligibility rules; some limited exceptions apply. Players may hold more than one non-FIFA nationality.

No.	Pos.	Nation	Player
—	MF	SWE	Pontus Silfwer (to (Norway) Mjøndalen)

=== GAIS ===
In: Note: Flags indicate national team as defined under FIFA eligibility rules; some limited exceptions apply. Players may hold more than one non-FIFA nationality.

No.	Pos.	Nation	Player
—	DF	SWE	Niclas Andersén (from (Sweden) BK Häcken)

Out: Note: Flags indicate national team as defined under FIFA eligibility rules; some limited exceptions apply. Players may hold more than one non-FIFA nationality.

No.	Pos.	Nation	Player
—	FW	SWE	Tommi Vaiho (to (Sweden) Djurgården)

=== Gefle IF ===
In: Note: Flags indicate national team as defined under FIFA eligibility rules; some limited exceptions apply. Players may hold more than one non-FIFA nationality.

No.	Pos.	Nation	Player

Out: Note: Flags indicate national team as defined under FIFA eligibility rules; some limited exceptions apply. Players may hold more than one non-FIFA nationality.

No.	Pos.	Nation	Player
—	DF	NOR	Simen Rafn (to (Norway) Lillestrøm)

=== Helsingborgs IF ===
In: Note: Flags indicate national team as defined under FIFA eligibility rules; some limited exceptions apply. Players may hold more than one non-FIFA nationality.

No.	Pos.	Nation	Player

Out: Note: Flags indicate national team as defined under FIFA eligibility rules; some limited exceptions apply. Players may hold more than one non-FIFA nationality.

No.	Pos.	Nation	Player
15	FW	SWE	Linus Hallenius (to (Sweden) GIF Sundsvall)

=== Norrby IF ===
In: Note: Flags indicate national team as defined under FIFA eligibility rules; some limited exceptions apply. Players may hold more than one non-FIFA nationality.

No.	Pos.	Nation	Player

Out: Note: Flags indicate national team as defined under FIFA eligibility rules; some limited exceptions apply. Players may hold more than one non-FIFA nationality.

No.	Pos.	Nation	Player

=== Syrianska FC ===
In: Note: Flags indicate national team as defined under FIFA eligibility rules; some limited exceptions apply. Players may hold more than one non-FIFA nationality.

No.	Pos.	Nation	Player

Out: Note: Flags indicate national team as defined under FIFA eligibility rules; some limited exceptions apply. Players may hold more than one non-FIFA nationality.

No.	Pos.	Nation	Player
—	DF	SWE	Alexander Michel (to (Sweden) Eskilstuna)

=== Trelleborgs FF ===
In: Note: Flags indicate national team as defined under FIFA eligibility rules; some limited exceptions apply. Players may hold more than one non-FIFA nationality.

No.	Pos.	Nation	Player

Out: Note: Flags indicate national team as defined under FIFA eligibility rules; some limited exceptions apply. Players may hold more than one non-FIFA nationality.

No.	Pos.	Nation	Player

=== Varbergs BoIS ===
In: Note: Flags indicate national team as defined under FIFA eligibility rules; some limited exceptions apply. Players may hold more than one non-FIFA nationality.

No.	Pos.	Nation	Player

Out: Note: Flags indicate national team as defined under FIFA eligibility rules; some limited exceptions apply. Players may hold more than one non-FIFA nationality.

No.	Pos.	Nation	Player
—	DF	NOR	Ivan Näsberg (loan return to (Norway) Vålerenga)

=== IFK Värnamo ===
In: Note: Flags indicate national team as defined under FIFA eligibility rules; some limited exceptions apply. Players may hold more than one non-FIFA nationality.

No.	Pos.	Nation	Player

Out: Note: Flags indicate national team as defined under FIFA eligibility rules; some limited exceptions apply. Players may hold more than one non-FIFA nationality.

No.	Pos.	Nation	Player
23	DF	SWE	David Engström (to (Sweden) BK Häcken)
31	GK	NOR	Jonathan Rasheed (to (Sweden) BK Häcken)

=== Åtvidabergs FF ===
In: Note: Flags indicate national team as defined under FIFA eligibility rules; some limited exceptions apply. Players may hold more than one non-FIFA nationality.

No.	Pos.	Nation	Player

Out: Note: Flags indicate national team as defined under FIFA eligibility rules; some limited exceptions apply. Players may hold more than one non-FIFA nationality.

No.	Pos.	Nation	Player
9	FW	SWE	Shkodran Maholli (to (Sweden) BK Häcken)
10	MF	SWE	Mauricio Albornoz (to (Sweden) Eskilstuna)

=== Örgryte IS ===
In: Note: Flags indicate national team as defined under FIFA eligibility rules; some limited exceptions apply. Players may hold more than one non-FIFA nationality.

No.	Pos.	Nation	Player

Out: Note: Flags indicate national team as defined under FIFA eligibility rules; some limited exceptions apply. Players may hold more than one non-FIFA nationality.

No.	Pos.	Nation	Player
—	DF	SWE	Jakob Lindström (to (Sweden) BK Häcken)

=== Östers IF ===
In: Note: Flags indicate national team as defined under FIFA eligibility rules; some limited exceptions apply. Players may hold more than one non-FIFA nationality.

No.	Pos.	Nation	Player
—	MF	NOR	Lars Fuhre (from (Norway) Mjøndalen)

Out: Note: Flags indicate national team as defined under FIFA eligibility rules; some limited exceptions apply. Players may hold more than one non-FIFA nationality.

No.	Pos.	Nation	Player
