= Andreas Andersson =

Andreas Andersson may refer to:

- Andreas Andersson (footballer, born 1974), Swedish footballer (forward)
- Andreas Andersson (footballer, born 1991), Swedish footballer (goalkeeper)
- Andreas Andersson (ice hockey) (born 1979), Swedish ice hockey goaltender
