= Carl Engström =

Carl Engström may refer to:

- Carl Engström (basketball) (born 1991), Swedish basketball player
- Carl Gunnar Engström (1912–1987), Swedish physician and innovator
- Carl Adolf Engström (1855–1924), Finnish engineer, businessman and vuorineuvos
- Carl David Engström (born 1990), Swedish footballer
