= 2019 K League 1 =

37th season of the top division of professional football in South Korea

Hana 1Q K League 1
- Season: 2019
- Dates: 1 March – 1 December 2019
- Champions: Jeonbuk Hyundai Motors (7th title)
- Relegated: Gyeongnam FC; Jeju United
- Champions League: Jeonbuk Hyundai Motors; Ulsan Hyundai; FC Seoul; Suwon Samsung Bluewings
- Matches: 228
- Goals: 593 (2.6 per match)
- Best player: Kim Bo-kyung
- Top goalscorer: Adam Taggart (20 goals)
- Biggest home win: Gangwon 4–0 Sangju (9 July 2019)
- Biggest away win: Jeju 0–5 Ulsan (3 August 2019)
- Highest scoring: Gangwon 5–4 Pohang (23 June 2019)
- Longest winning run: 5 matches Jeonbuk Hyundai Motors
- Longest unbeaten run: 18 matches Jeonbuk Hyundai Motors
- Longest winless run: 20 matches Gyeongnam FC
- Longest losing run: 5 matches Gyeongnam FC; Jeju United
- Highest attendance: 32,057; Seoul 4–2 Suwon (16 June 2019)
- Lowest attendance: 955; Jeju 3–0 Seongnam (21 September 2019)
- Average attendance: 8,014

The 2019 K League 1 was the 37th season of the top division of professional football in South Korea since its establishment in 1983, and the seventh season of the K League 1. Jeonbuk Hyundai Motors were the defending champions.

In the 17th round on 23 June, Pohang Steelers were leading Gangwon FC 4–0 away after 70 minutes, but Gangwon scored five unanswered goals including three in injury time to win 5–4.

== Teams ==
Locations of the 2019 K League 1 clubs

=== General information ===
Club	City/Province	Manager	Owner(s)	Other sponsor(s)
Daegu FC	Daegu	(Brazil) Andre	Daegu Government	DGB Daegu Bank
Gangwon FC	Gangwon	(South Korea) Kim Byung-soo	Gangwon Provincial Government	high1
Gyeongnam FC	Gyeongnam	(South Korea) Kim Jong-boo	Gyeongnam Provincial Government	
Incheon United	Incheon	(South Korea) Yoo Sang-chul	Incheon Government	Shinhan Bank; Incheon International Airport
Jeonbuk Hyundai Motors	Jeonbuk	(Portugal) José Morais	Hyundai Motor Company	Hummel
Jeju United	Jeju	(South Korea) Jo Sung-hwan	SK Energy	
Pohang Steelers	Pohang	(South Korea) Kim Gi-dong	POSCO	Pohang City Hall
Sangju Sangmu	Sangju	(South Korea) Kim Tae-wan	Korea Armed Forces Athletic Corps	
Seongnam FC	Seongnam	(South Korea) Nam Ki-il	Seongnam Government	
FC Seoul	Seoul	(South Korea) Choi Yong-soo	GS Group	
Suwon Samsung Bluewings	Suwon	(South Korea) Lee Lim-saeng	Cheil Worldwide	Samsung Electronics; Maeil Dairies Industry
Ulsan Hyundai	Ulsan	(South Korea) Kim Do-hoon	Hyundai Heavy Industries	Hyundai Oilbank

=== Stadiums ===
Daegu FC	Gangwon FC	Gyeongnam FC	Incheon United	Jeju United	Jeonbuk Hyundai Motors
DGB Daegu Bank Park	Chuncheon Songam Leports Town	Changwon Football Center	Incheon Football Stadium	Jeju World Cup Stadium	Jeonju World Cup Stadium
Capacity: **12,415**	Capacity: **20,000**	Capacity: **20,245**	Capacity: **20,891**	Capacity: **35,657**	Capacity: **42,477**
Pohang Steelers	Sangju Sangmu	Seongnam FC	FC Seoul	Suwon Samsung Bluewings	Ulsan Hyundai
Pohang Steel Yard	Sangju Civic Stadium	Tancheon Stadium	Seoul World Cup Stadium	Suwon World Cup Stadium	Ulsan Munsu Football Stadium
Capacity: **17,443**	Capacity: **15,042**	Capacity: **16,146**	Capacity: **66,704**	Capacity: **44,031**	Capacity: **44,102**

=== Foreign players ===
Restricting the number of foreign players strictly to four per team, including a slot for a player from AFC countries. A team could use four foreign players on the field each game including at least one player from the AFC confederation. Players name in bold indicates the player is registered during the mid-season transfer window.

Club	Player 1	Player 2	Player 3	AFC player	Former players
Daegu FC	(Brazil) Césinha	(Brazil) Edgar Silva	(Brazil) **Rildo**	(Japan) Tsubasa Nishi	(Brazil) Dário Júnior
Gangwon FC	(Bosnia and Herzegovina) Nemanja Bilbija	(Cyprus) Valentinos Sielis		(Japan) **Takahiro Nakazato**	(Serbia) Uroš Đerić
Gyeongnam FC	(Brazil) **Osman Júnior**	(Netherlands) Luc Castaignos	(Serbia) **Uroš Đerić**	(Japan) Takahiro Kunimoto	(Brazil) Negueba (England) Jordan Mutch
Incheon United	(Bosnia and Herzegovina) Gordan Bunoza	(Montenegro) Stefan Mugoša	(Nigeria) **Lanre Kehinde**	(Australia) **Rashid Mahazi**	(Sweden) Jiloan Hamad (Vietnam) Nguyễn Công Phượng
Jeju United	(Brazil) Magno Cruz	(Costa Rica) Elías Aguilar	(Nigeria) **Christian Osaguona**	(Australia) Aleksandar Jovanović	(Brazil) Tiago Marques
Jeonbuk Hyundai Motors	(Brazil) Ricardo Lopes	(Brazil) **Samuel**		(Australia) Bernie Ibini-Isei	(Brazil) Adriano Michael Jackson (Brazil) Tiago Alves
Pohang Steelers	(Brazil) Wanderson Carvalho	(Russia) **Stanislav Iljutcenko**	(Serbia) **Aleksandar Paločević**		(Montenegro) Vladan Adžić
Seongnam FC	(Brazil) Éder	(Martinique) Mathias Coureur			(Brazil) Jajá
FC Seoul	(Spain) Osmar	(Serbia) Aleksandar Pešić		(Uzbekistan) Ikromjon Alibaev	
Suwon Samsung Bluewings	(Montenegro) Dejan Damjanović	(Brazil) Waguininho	(Australia) **Terry Antonis**	(Australia) Adam Taggart	(Bosnia and Herzegovina) Elvis Sarić
Ulsan Hyundai	(Brazil) Júnior Negrão	(Netherlands) Dave Bulthuis	(United States) Mix Diskerud	(Australia) **Jason Davidson**	

== League table ==
Pos	Team	Pld	W	D	L	GF	GA	GD	Pts	Qualification or relegation (Note: Teams are split into two groups (Final A and Final B) after each have played 33 matches.)
1	Jeonbuk Hyundai Motors (C)	38	22	13	3	72	32	+40	79	Qualification for Champions League group stage
2	Ulsan Hyundai	38	23	10	5	71	39	+32	79	Qualification for Champions League group stage
3	FC Seoul	38	15	11	12	53	49	+4	56	Qualification for Champions League play-off round
4	Pohang Steelers	38	16	8	14	49	49	0	56	
5	Daegu FC	38	13	16	9	46	37	+9	55	
6	Gangwon FC	38	14	8	16	56	58	−2	50	
7	Sangju Sangmu	38	16	7	15	49	53	−4	55	
8	Suwon Samsung Bluewings	38	12	12	14	46	49	−3	48	Qualification for Champions League group stage (Note: Qualified as champions of FA Cup.)
9	Seongnam FC	38	12	9	17	30	40	−10	45	
10	Incheon United	38	7	13	18	33	54	−21	34	
11	Gyeongnam FC (R)	38	6	15	17	43	61	−18	33	Qualification for relegation play-offs
12	Jeju United (R)	38	5	12	21	45	72	−27	27	Relegation to K League 2

Source: K League
Rules for classification: 1) Points; 2) Goals scored; 3) Goal difference; 4) Wins; 5) Head-to-head points
(C) Champions; (R) Relegated

== Positions by matchday ==
Leaders
Qualification for Champions League group stage
Qualification for Champions League play-off round
Qualification for relegation play-offs
Relegation to K League 2

=== Round 1–33 ===
Team ╲ Round	1	2	3	4	5	6	7	8	9	10	11	12	13	14	15	16	17	18	19	20	21	22	23	24	25	26	27	28	29	30	31	32	33
Ulsan Hyundai	3	6	4	3	1	1	1	2	2	2	1	1	1	2	2	2	3	3	2	2	2	2	1	1	1	2	1	2	2	2	2	1	1
Jeonbuk Hyundai Motors	5	3	5	4	4	3	3	1	1	1	2	2	2	1	1	1	1	1	1	1	1	1	2	2	2	1	2	1	1	1	1	2	2
FC Seoul	2	2	2	1	2	2	2	3	3	4	3	3	3	3	3	3	2	2	3	3	3	3	3	3	3	3	3	3	3	3	3	3	3
Daegu FC	8	4	3	5	5	5	5	4	4	3	4	4	4	4	4	4	4	4	4	5	5	5	5	5	6	6	4	5	5	5	4	4	4
Pohang Steelers	11	11	8	8	8	7	9	10	8	6	7	6	6	6	7	7	7	7	8	8	7	8	9	9	9	9	9	8	8	8	6	6	5
Gangwon FC	12	9	7	7	7	9	10	7	7	8	6	5	7	7	6	6	5	5	5	4	4	4	4	4	4	4	5	4	4	4	5	5	6
Sangju Sangmu	1	1	1	2	3	4	4	6	5	5	5	7	5	5	5	5	6	6	6	7	8	7	7	7	5	5	6	6	7	7	7	7	7
Suwon Samsung Bluewings	10	12	12	10	10	8	8	9	10	9	8	8	8	8	8	8	8	9	7	6	6	6	6	6	7	7	7	7	6	6	8	8	8
Seongnam FC	9	10	10	11	9	10	7	5	6	7	9	9	9	9	9	9	9	8	9	9	9	9	8	8	8	8	8	9	9	9	9	9	9
Gyeongnam FC	4	7	9	9	6	6	6	8	9	10	10	10	11	10	10	10	10	10	10	11	11	11	11	11	10	10	10	10	10	10	10	10	10
Incheon United	6	5	6	6	11	12	12	11	11	12	12	12	12	12	12	12	11	11	12	12	12	12	12	12	11	11	12	11	11	12	11	11	11
Jeju United	7	8	11	12	12	11	11	12	12	11	11	11	10	11	11	11	12	12	11	10	10	10	10	10	12	12	11	12	12	11	12	12	12

Source: K League

=== Round 34–38 ===
Team ╲ Round	34	35	36	37	38
Jeonbuk Hyundai Motors	2	2	2	2	1
Ulsan Hyundai	1	1	1	1	2
FC Seoul	3	3	3	3	3
Pohang Steelers	6	6	6	5	4
Daegu FC	4	4	4	4	5
Gangwon FC	5	5	5	6	6
Sangju Sangmu	7	7	7	7	7
Suwon Samsung Bluewings	8	8	8	8	8
Seongnam FC	9	9	9	9	9
Incheon United	10	10	10	10	10
Gyeongnam FC	11	11	11	11	11
Jeju United	12	12	12	12	12

Source: K League

== Results ==
=== Matches 1–22 ===
Teams play each other twice, once at home, once away.

Home \ Away	DGU	GWN	GNM	ICU	JJU	JHM	PHS	SJS	SFC	SEO	SSB	USH
Daegu FC	—	2–2	1–1	2–1	2–0	1–4	3–0	1–0	1–1	1–2	0–0	1–1
Gangwon FC	0–2	—	2–1	1–0	0–1	2–3	5–4	4–0	2–1	1–2	0–2	0–0
Gyeongnam FC	2–1	0–2	—	1–1	2–2	3–3	1–2	1–1	2–1	1–2	3–3	1–3
Incheon United	0–3	1–2	2–1	—	1–1	0–1	0–1	1–2	0–0	0–2	2–3	0–3
Jeju United	1–1	2–4	2–0	1–2	—	0–1	1–1	2–3	1–2	4–2	1–3	1–3
Jeonbuk Hyundai Motors	1–1	0–1	4–1	2–0	3–1	—	2–0	2–0	3–1	2–1	1–1	1–1
Pohang Steelers	0–2	1–0	4–1	1–2	1–1	1–1	—	1–2	1–0	0–0	1–0	2–1
Sangju Sangmu	2–0	2–0	1–1	2–0	4–2	0–3	1–1	—	1–0	1–3	0–2	0–1
Seongnam FC	0–1	1–2	1–1	0–0	1–1	0–0	2–0	1–0	—	0–1	2–1	1–4
FC Seoul	2–1	2–2	2–1	0–0	0–0	2–4	2–0	2–0	3–1	—	4–2	2–2
Suwon Samsung Bluewings	0–0	1–1	0–0	2–1	2–0	0–4	3–0	0–0	1–2	1–1	—	1–3
Ulsan Hyundai	0–0	2–1	2–0	1–0	2–1	2–1	1–0	2–2	0–1	2–1	2–1	—

Source: K League
Legend: Blue = home team win; Yellow = draw; Red = away team win.

=== Matches 23–33 ===
Teams play every other team once (either at home or away).

Home \ Away	DGU	GWN	GNM	ICU	JJU	JHM	PHS	SJS	SFC	SEO	SSB	USH
Daegu FC	—	3–1	1–0	—	2–2	—	0–0	—	—	—	0–2	—
Gangwon FC	—	—	2–0	2–2	2–0	3–3	2–1	—	—	—	1–3	—
Gyeongnam FC	—	—	—	—	—	1–1	0–1	—	2–0	—	2–0	3–3
Incheon United	1–1	—	1–1	—	0–0	0–0	—	—	0–1	—	—	3–3
Jeju United	—	—	1–2	—	—	—	—	1–4	3–0	1–1	—	0–5
Jeonbuk Hyundai Motors	0–2	—	—	—	2–2	—	—	2–1	1–1		2–0	3–0
Pohang Steelers	—	—	—	5–3	2–1	1–2	—	—	1–0	2–1	—	2–1
Sangju Sangmu	1–1	2–1	2–1	2–3	—	—	2–1	—	—	—	—	—
Seongnam FC	1–2	1–0	—	—	—	—	—	1–0	—	1–0	0–0	—
FC Seoul	2–1	0–0	1–1	3–1	—	0–2	—	1–2	—	—	—	—
Suwon Samsung Bluewings	—	—	—	0–1	1–0	—	0–2	1–1	—	1–2	—	0–2
Ulsan Hyundai	1–1	2–0	—	—	—	—	—	5–1	1–0	3–1	—	—

Source: K League
Legend: Blue = home team win; Yellow = draw; Red = away team win.

=== Matches 34–38 ===
After 33 matches, the league splits into two sections of six teams each, with teams playing every other team in their section once (either at home or away). The exact matches are determined upon the league table at the time of the split.

==== Final A ====
Home \ Away	DGU	GWN	JHM	PHS	SEO	USH
Daegu FC	—	—	0–2	—	0–0	1–2
Gangwon FC	2–4	—	—	—	3–2	—
Jeonbuk Hyundai Motors	—	1–0	—	3–0	1–1	—
Pohang Steelers	0–0	2–2	—	—	—	—
FC Seoul	—	—	—	0–3	—	0–1
Ulsan Hyundai	—	2–1	1–1	1–4	—	—

Source: K League
Legend: Blue = home team win; Yellow = draw; Red = away team win.

==== Final B ====
Home \ Away	GNM	ICU	JJU	SJS	SNM	SSB
Gyeongnam FC	—	0–0	2–2	0–1	—	—
Incheon United	—	—	—	2–0	—	1–1
Jeju United	—	2–0	—	—	—	2–4
Sangju Sangmu	—	—	2–1	—	0–1	4–1
Seongnam FC	1–2	0–1	3–1	—	—	—
Suwon Samsung Bluewings	2–1	—	—	—	0–0	—

Source: K League
Legend: Blue = home team win; Yellow = draw; Red = away team win.

== Relegation play-offs ==
The promotion-relegation play-offs were held between the winners of the 2019 K League 2 play-offs and the 11th-placed club of the 2019 K League 1.

5 December 2019
19:00 KST

Busan IPark	0–0	Gyeongnam FC
	Report

Busan Gudeok Stadium, Busan
Attendance: 8,249
Referee: Kim Dae-yong

8 December 2019
14:00 KST

Gyeongnam FC	0–2	Busan IPark
	Report	Rômulo 78' (pen.); Novothny 90+5'

Changwon Football Center
Attendance: 5,397
Referee: Go Hyung-jin

Busan IPark won 2–0 on aggregate and were promoted to the K League 1, while Gyeongnam FC were relegated to the K League 2.

== Player statistics ==
=== Top scorers ===
Rank	Player	Club	Goals
1	(Australia) Adam Taggart	Suwon Samsung Bluewings	20
2	(Brazil) Júnior Negrão	Ulsan Hyundai	19
3	(Brazil) Cesinha	Daegu FC	15
3	(Brazil) Wanderson Carvalho	Pohang Steelers	15
5	(Montenegro) Stefan Mugoša	Incheon United	14
6	(Serbia) Uroš Đerić	Gangwon FC; Gyeongnam FC	13
6	(South Korea) Kim Bo-kyung	Ulsan Hyundai	13
8	(South Korea) Park Yong-ji	Sangju Sangmu	12
9	(Brazil) Edgar Silva	Daegu FC	11
9	(Brazil) Ricardo Lopes	Jeonbuk Hyundai Motors	11

=== Top assist providers ===
Rank	Player	Club	Assists
1	(South Korea) Moon Seon-min	Jeonbuk Hyundai Motors	10
1	(Brazil) Cesinha	Daegu FC	10
3	(South Korea) Kim Bo-kyung	Ulsan Hyundai	9
3	(Brazil) Wanderson Carvalho	Pohang Steelers	9
5	(South Korea) Kim Seung-dae	Pohang Steelers; Jeonbuk Hyundai Motors	8
6	(Bosnia and Herzegovina) Elvis Sarić	Suwon Samsung Bluewings	7
6	(South Korea) Kim Tae-hwan	Ulsan Hyundai	7
6	(South Korea) Park Chu-young	FC Seoul	7
6	(Brazil) Ricardo Lopes	Jeonbuk Hyundai Motors	7
10	(South Korea) Lee Yeong-jae	Gyeongnam FC; Gangwon FC	6
10	(South Korea) Jung Seung-yong	Gangwon FC	6
10	(South Korea) Go Yo-han	FC Seoul	6

== Awards ==
=== Main awards ===
The 2019 K League Awards was held on 2 December 2019.

Award	Winner	Club
Most Valuable Player	(South Korea) Kim Bo-kyung	Ulsan Hyundai
Top goalscorer	(Australia) Adam Taggart	Suwon Samsung Bluewings
Top assist provider	(South Korea) Moon Seon-min	Jeonbuk Hyundai Motors
Young Player of the Year	(South Korea) Kim Ji-hyeon	Gangwon FC
Manager of the Year	(Portugal) José Morais	Jeonbuk Hyundai Motors

=== Best XI ===
Position	Winner	Club
Goalkeeper	(South Korea) Jo Hyeon-woo	Daegu FC
Defenders	(South Korea) Hong Chul	Suwon Samsung Bluewings
Defenders	(South Korea) Hong Jeong-ho	Jeonbuk Hyundai Motors
Defenders	(South Korea) Lee Yong	Jeonbuk Hyundai Motors
Defenders	(South Korea) Kim Tae-hwan	Ulsan Hyundai
Midfielders	(South Korea) Moon Seon-min	Jeonbuk Hyundai Motors
Midfielders	(South Korea) Kim Bo-kyung	Ulsan Hyundai
Midfielders	(Brazil) Cesinha	Daegu FC
Midfielders	(Brazil) Wanderson Carvalho	Pohang Steelers
Forwards	(Australia) Adam Taggart	Suwon Samsung Bluewings
Forwards	(Brazil) Júnior Negrão	Ulsan Hyundai

=== Monthly awards ===
Month	Player of the Month		Manager of the Month			Goal of the Month	
Month	Player	Club	Manager	Club	Division	Player	Club
March	(Brazil) Cesinha	Daegu FC	(South Korea) Choi Yong-soo	FC Seoul	K League 1	(South Korea) Kim Dae-won	Daegu FC
April	(South Korea) Kim Jin-hyuk	Daegu FC	(Portugal) José Morais	Jeonbuk Hyundai Motors	K League 1	(South Korea) Yeom Ki-hun	Suwon Samsung Bluewings
May	(South Korea) Kim Shin-wook	Jeonbuk Hyundai Motors	(South Korea) Cho Deok-je	Busan IPark	K League 2	(Serbia) Aleksandar Pešić	FC Seoul
June	(South Korea) Cho Jae-wan	Gangwon FC	(South Korea) Park Jin-sub	Gwangju FC	K League 2	(South Korea) Cho Jae-wan	Gangwon FC
July	(Australia) Adam Taggart	Suwon Samsung Bluewings	(South Korea) Kim Do-hoon	Ulsan Hyundai	K League 1	(Brazil) Éder	Seongnam FC
August	(Brazil) Wanderson Carvalho	Pohang Steelers	(Portugal) José Morais	Jeonbuk Hyundai Motors	K League 1	(South Korea) Lee Soo-bin	Pohang Steelers
September	(Brazil) Júnior Negrão	Ulsan Hyundai	(South Korea) Kim Gi-dong	Pohang Steelers	K League 1	(South Korea) Kim Ji-hyeon	Gangwon FC
October	(South Korea) Moon Seon-min	Jeonbuk Hyundai Motors	(South Korea) Park Jin-sub	Gwangju FC	K League 2	(South Korea) Moon Seon-min	Jeonbuk Hyundai Motors
November			(South Korea) Kim Gi-dong	Pohang Steelers	K League 1	(South Korea) Kim Jin-su	Jeonbuk Hyundai Motors

=== Player of the Round ===
Round	Winner	Club
1	(Brazil) Cesinha	Daegu FC
2	(Brazil) Ricardo Lopes	Jeonbuk Hyundai Motors
3	(South Korea) Kim Seung-dae	Pohang Steelers
4	(Australia) Adam Taggart	Suwon Samsung Bluewings
5	(South Korea) Kim Jin-hyuk	Daegu FC
6	(Serbia) Aleksandar Pešić	FC Seoul
7	(South Korea) Kim In-sung	Ulsan Hyundai
8	(South Korea) Kim Hyeon-uk	Gangwon FC
9	(South Korea) Kim Tae-hwan	Ulsan Hyundai
10	(South Korea) Kim Seung-dae	Pohang Steelers
11	(South Korea) Park Chu-young	FC Seoul
12	(Brazil) Wanderson Carvalho	Pohang Steelers
13	(South Korea) Kim Shin-wook	Jeonbuk Hyundai Motors
14	(South Korea) Moon Seon-min	Jeonbuk Hyundai Motors
15	(South Korea) Park Chu-young	FC Seoul
16	(Spain) Osmar	FC Seoul
17	(South Korea) Cho Jae-wan	Gangwon FC
18	(South Korea) Jung Jo-gook	Gangwon FC
19	(South Korea) Kim Ji-hyeon	Gangwon FC

Round	Winner	Club
20	(South Korea) Yun Il-lok	Jeju United
21	(South Korea) Jo Hyeon-woo	Daegu FC
22	(South Korea) Hong Jeong-ho	Jeonbuk Hyundai Motors
23	(South Korea) Kim Bo-kyung	Ulsan Hyundai
24	(South Korea) Kim Bo-kyung	Ulsan Hyundai
25	(South Korea) Kim Hyo-gi	Gyeongnam FC
26	(Australia) Adam Taggart	Suwon Samsung Bluewings
27	(Brazil) Wanderson Carvalho	Pohang Steelers
28	(Montenegro) Stefan Mugoša	Incheon United
29	(South Korea) Kim Ji-hyeon	Gangwon FC
30	(Brazil) Wanderson Carvalho	Pohang Steelers
31	(Montenegro) Stefan Mugoša	Incheon United
32	(South Korea) Ryu Seung-woo	Sangju Sangmu
33	(South Korea) Lee Gwang-hyeok	Pohang Steelers
34	(South Korea) Lee Hyeon-sik	Gangwon FC
35	(Brazil) Júnior Negrão	Ulsan Hyundai
36	(South Korea) Kim Bo-kyung	Ulsan Hyundai
37	(Brazil) Cesinha	Daegu FC
38	(South Korea) Son Jun-ho	Jeonbuk Hyundai Motors

== Attendance ==
Attendants who entered with free ticket are not counted.

Pos	Team	Total	High	Low	Average	Change
1	FC Seoul	324,162	32,057	7,719	17,061	+47.6%
2	Jeonbuk Hyundai Motors	278,738	20,637	10,044	13,937	+16.9%
3	Daegu FC	203,951	12,172	8,247	10,734	+205.1%
4	Ulsan Hyundai	184,148	19,011	1,568	9,692	+28.8%
5	Suwon Samsung Bluewings	168,024	24,019	3,353	8,843	+31.8%
6	Incheon United	161,593	18,541	4,879	8,505	+92.0%
7	Pohang Steelers	161,134	14,769	2,486	8,481	+13.3%
8	Seongnam FC	105,950	11,238	2,421	5,576	+132.3%^{†}
9	Gyeongnam FC	73,646	7,252	1,034	3,876	+23.0%
10	Jeju United	66,741	6,034	955	3,708	+14.7%
11	Gangwon FC	54,331	5,823	1,732	2,860	+110.9%
12	Sangju Sangmu	44,702	6,278	1,161	2,353	+78.5%
	League total	1,827,120	32,057	955	8,014	+47.2%

Updated to games played on 1 December 2019
Source: K League
Notes:
^{†} Teams that played previous season in K League 2.

== See also ==
- 2019 in South Korean football
- 2019 K League 2
- 2019 Korean FA Cup
