= Kim Ji-hyeon (footballer) =

South Korean footballer

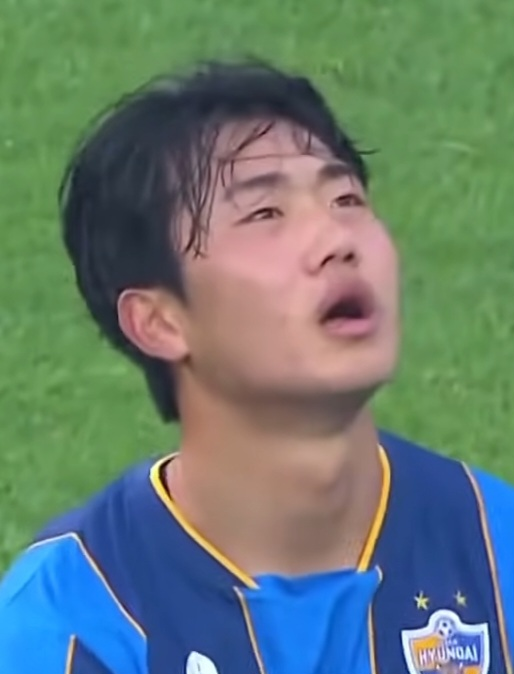

Personal information
- Full name: Kim Ji-hyeon
- Date of birth: 22 July 1996 (age 30)
- Place of birth: South Korea
- Height: 1.83 m (6 ft 0 in)
- Position: Forward

Team information
- Current team: Suwon Samsung Bluewings
- Number: 77

Youth career
- 2015–2017: Halla University

Senior career*
Years	Team	Apps	(Gls)
2018–2020	Gangwon FC	62	(21)
2021–2024	Ulsan Hyundai	32	(2)
2022–2023	Gimcheon Sangmu (Army)	26	(4)
2025–	Suwon Samsung Bluewings	48	(14)

International career^{‡}
2020–	South Korea	0	(0)
- * Club domestic league appearances and goals as of 5 August 2026 ‡ National team caps and goals as of 29 September 2020

Kim Ji-hyeon (Korean: 김지현; born 22 July 1996) is a South Korean footballer who plays as forward for Suwon Samsung Bluewings.

== Career ==
Kim joined K League 1 side Gangwon FC before the start of the 2018 season.

== Club ==
As of 29 May 2021

Club performance			League		Cup		Continental		Total	
Season	Club	League	Apps	Goals	Apps	Goals	Apps	Goals	Apps	Goals
2018	Gangwon FC	K League 1	12	3	1	0	—		13	3
2019	Gangwon FC	K League 1	27	10	2	0	—		29	10
2020	Gangwon FC	K League 1	23	8	2	0	—		25	8
2021	Ulsan Hyundai	K League 1	12	1	1	1	2 (Note: Appearances in 2020 FIFA Club World Cup)	0	15	2
Career total			74	22	6	1	2	0	82	23

== Honours ==
=== Individual ===
- K League Young Player of the Year: 2019
