= Sasa Sjanic =

Swedish footballer

Personal information
- Date of birth: 18 February 1986 (age 40)
- Height: 1.97 m (6 ft 6 in)
- Position: Goalkeeper

Youth career
- Skiljebo SK

Senior career*
Years	Team	Apps	(Gls)
2006	Kalmar FF	0	(0)
2007–2008	IFK Norrköping	6	(0)
2009–2010	IK Sleipner	13	(0)
2011–2013	Vasalunds IF	70	(0)
2014–2015	Gefle IF	5	(0)
- * Club domestic league appearances and goals

Sasa Sjanic (Bosnian: Saša Sjanić; born 18 February 1981) is a Swedish former footballer who played as a goalkeeper.
