= Calle Svensson =

Swedish footballer

Personal information
- Date of birth: 19 June 1987 (age 39)
- Height: 1.79 m (5 ft 10 in)
- Position: Midfielder

Team information
- Current team: IK Sleipner

Youth career
- Lindö FF

Senior career*
Years	Team	Apps	(Gls)
2005	Lindö FF		
2006–2012	IK Sleipner		
2013–2014	Nyköpings BIS	36	(2)
2015	GAIS	23	(0)
2016	Nyköpings BIS	14	(0)
2016	Husqvarna FF	11	(0)
2017–2020	Västerås SK	83	(0)
2021	IFK Mariehamn	26	(0)
2022–	IK Sleipner	0	(0)
- * Club domestic league appearances and goals as of 29 November 2021

Calle Svensson (born 19 June 1987) is a Swedish former professional footballer who played as a midfielder.

He spent the final years of his career with IK Sleipner. In October 2022, Svensson announced his retirement from professional football, effective at the conclusion of the season.

== Club career ==
On 9 December 2021, he returned to IK Sleipner.
