= Peter Westberg =

Swedish footballer

Personal information
- Full name: Hans Peter Emil Westberg
- Date of birth: 22 September 1995 (age 31)
- Place of birth: Visby, Sweden
- Height: 1.85 m (6 ft 1 in)
- Position: Midfielder

Team information
- Current team: Gjøvik-Lyn

Youth career
- –2011: Visby AIK
- 2012–2014: Kalmar FF

Senior career*
Years	Team	Apps	(Gls)
2011–2012	Visby AIK	28	(7)
2011	→ Visby AIK TFF	8	(2)
2012	→ Visby AIK B	1	(0)
2014–2015	Kalmar FF	1	(0)
2015	→ Oskarshamns AIK	9	(0)
2016	Brumunddal Fotball	0	(0)
2016–	Gjøvik-Lyn	0	(0)
- * Club domestic league appearances and goals as of 2 April 2016

Peter Westberg (born 22 September 1995) is a Swedish footballer who plays for Gjøvik-Lyn as a midfielder.
