= Sebastian Ohlsson (footballer, born 1992) =

Swedish footballer

Personal information
- Full name: Sebastian Jonas Ohlsson
- Date of birth: 31 December 1992 (age 33)
- Place of birth: Sweden
- Height: 1.86 m (6 ft 1 in)
- Position: Defensive midfielder

Team information
- Current team: Degerfors IF
- Number: 7

Youth career
- Hova IF

Senior career*
Years	Team	Apps	(Gls)
2010–2013	Skövde AIK	88	(20)
2014–2015	BK Häcken	8	(0)
2016–2017	Degerfors IF	57	(1)
2018–2019	Trelleborgs FF	56	(6)
2020–	Degerfors IF	145	(3)
- * Club domestic league appearances and goals as of 8 July 2026

Sebastian Ohlsson (born 31 December 1992), sometimes spelled Sebastian Olsson, is a Swedish footballer who plays as a defensive midfielder for Degerfors IF.

== Career ==
=== Club career ===
Ohlsson started playing football at Hova IF. He began his senior career at Skövde AIK, where he played between 2010 and 2013. In November 2013, he signed a three-year contract with BK Häcken. He made his Allsvenskan debut on 24 May 2014 in a 1–1 draw against Falkenbergs FF, replacing Ivo Pękalski in the 77th minute. However, he didn't play much and was mostly used on the U21 team. In 2014, Ohlsson won the U21 championship as the team captain, but the lack of playing time in Häcken made him look for alternatives.

In November 2015, Ohlsson signed a two-year contract with Superettan club Degerfors IF. In December 2017, Ohlsson was acquired by Trelleborgs FF, where he signed a three-year contract.

On 21 November 2019, Ohlsson returned to Degerfors IF, where he signed a three-year contract.
