= Isa Demir =

Swedish footballer of Assyrian descent

Personal information
- Full name: Isa Demir
- Date of birth: 10 August 1985 (age 41)
- Place of birth: Södertälje, Sweden
- Height: 1.80 m (5 ft 11 in)
- Position: Right back

Team information
- Current team: Assyriska United
- Number: 85

Youth career
- IFK Värnamo

Senior career*
Years	Team	Apps	(Gls)
2006	IFK Värnamo		
2007–2014	Syrianska FC	115	(4)
2014–2015	Boluspor	4	(0)
2015	Assyriska FF	22	(1)
2016	AFC United	20	(0)
2017	Assyriska FF	16	(0)
2018–2019	Syrianska FC	19	(0)
2020–	Assyriska United	19	(0)
- * Club domestic league appearances and goals as of 19:52, 3 September 2020 (UTC)

Isa Demir (born 10 August 1985) is a Swedish footballer of Assyrian descent who plays as a right back for Assyriska United IK.
