= Carlos Gaete Moggia =

Swedish footballer

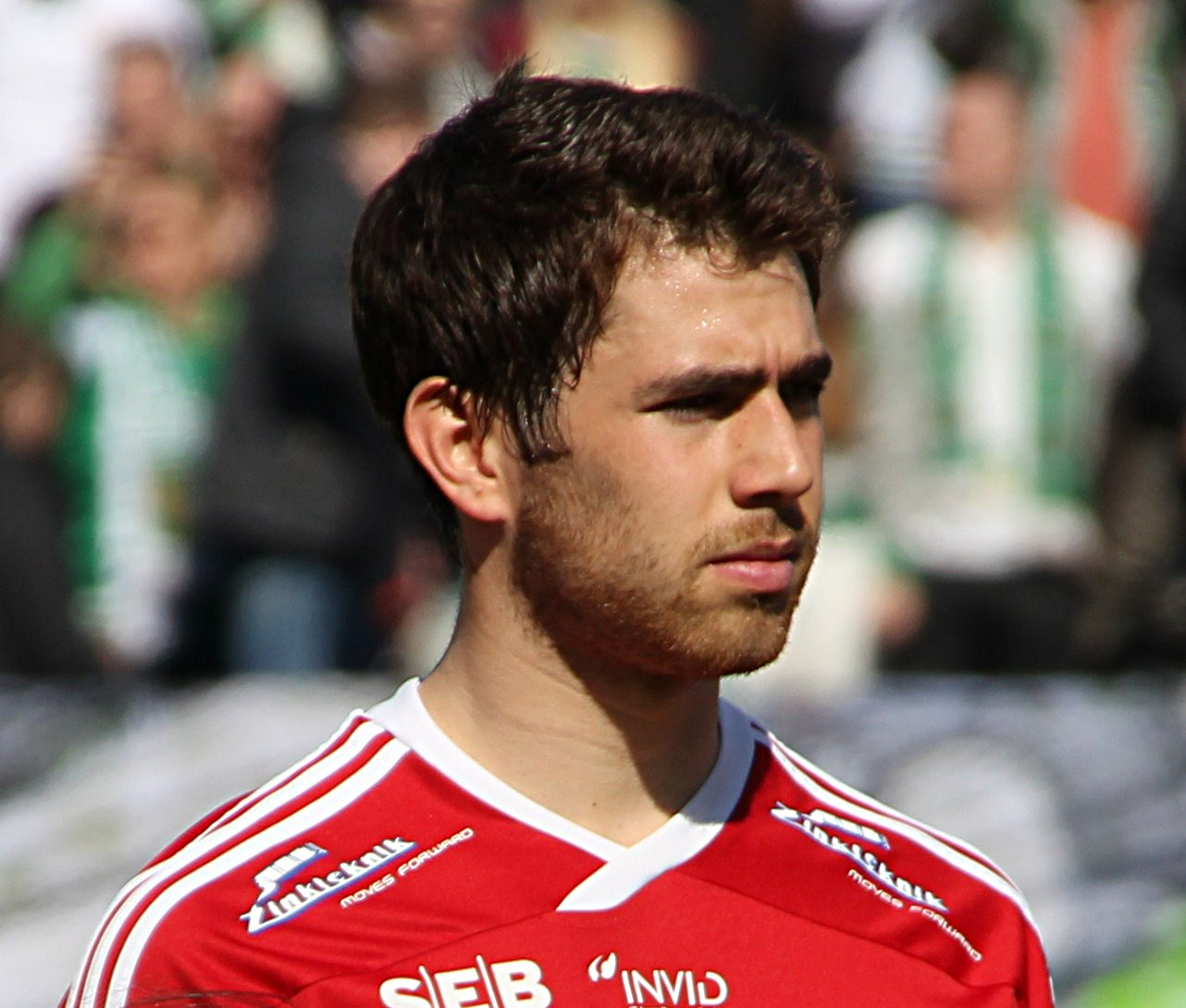

Personal information
- Full name: Carlos Gaete Moggia
- Date of birth: 4 November 1987 (age 39)
- Place of birth: Stockholm, Sweden
- Position: Midfielder

Youth career
- 2002–2005: Haninge FF

Senior career*
Years	Team	Apps	(Gls)
2005–2008	Hammarby TFF	29	(4)
2006	→ Haningealliansen FF (loan)	6	
2008–2011	Hammarby IF	54	(1)
2011	Sirius	11	(0)
2012–2015	Värnamo	85	(3)
2016	AFC United	0	(0)
2017	Elverum Fotball	10	(0)
2017–2020	Västerås	51	(0)
2020	Haninge	9	(0)
2021	FC Stockholm Internazionale	16	(0)

International career
2008–2009	Sweden U-21	7	(0)
- * Club domestic league appearances and goals as of 7 June 2023

Carlos Gaete Moggia (born 4 November 1987 in Stockholm) is a Swedish football midfielder of Chilean descent.

== Career ==
Moggia began his career in the youth side for Haninge FF and joined in Spring 2005 to Hammarby Talang FF. After one season left Hammarby and joined on loan to Haningealliansen FF in the early of 2006.

He made his debut for Hammarby's first team on 14 July 2008 in an away win against Malmö, a match in which he scored with a volley.

He played another three seasons in the club, not being a regular in any season, before joining third-tier club IK Sirius in August 2011.

He spent the first half of the 2017 season with the Norwegian side Elverum Fotball. Following one last season in FC Stockholm Internazionale in 2021, he retired.
