= Andreas Andersson (footballer, born 1991) =

Swedish footballer

Personal information
- Full name: Andreas Johny Sebastian Andersson
- Date of birth: 27 February 1991 (age 35)
- Place of birth: Borås, Sweden
- Height: 1.92 m (6 ft 4 in)
- Position: Goalkeeper

Youth career
- –2008: Gerdskens BK
- 2008–2010: IF Elfsborg

Senior career*
Years	Team	Apps	(Gls)
2010–2013	IF Elfsborg	0	(0)
2011	→ Trollhättan (loan)	2	(0)
2013	→ Ljungskile SK (loan)	10	(0)
2014–2016	IK Sirius	60	(0)
2016–2017	Gefle IF	22	(0)
2017	→ Östersunds FK (loan)	10	(0)
2018–2019	Östersunds FK	19	(0)
2019	Dalkurd FF	27	(0)
2020–2022	Sundsvall	58	(0)
- * Club domestic league appearances and goals as of 6 November 2022

Andreas Andersson (born 27 February 1991) is a Swedish footballer.

== Career ==
=== Club career ===
Andersson started at Gerdskens BK, before joining IF Elfsborg in 2008. In March 2011, Andersson was loaned out to Division 1 club FC Trollhättan. After only two matches at the club, Andersson was recalled to Elfsborg after Jesper Christiansen injured himself. In February 2013, Andersson was loaned out to Ljungskile SK.

In December 2013, Andersson joined IK Sirius, where he signed a two-year contract. After two years as first goalkeeper in Sirius, Andersson moved to Gefle IF in November 2015, where he signed a three-year contract. Andersson made his Allsvenskan debut on April 10, 2016 in a 2-1 loss against Djurgårdens IF.

In January 2017, Andersson was loaned out to Allsvenskan club Östersunds FK. In January 2018, he signed a three-year contract with the club. On January 29, 2019, Andersson was recruited by Dalkurd FF. After the 2019 season, he left the club.

On 1 February 2020, Andersson was recruited by GIF Sundsvall, where he signed a three-year contract.
