= Moon Seon-min =

South Korean footballer (born 1992)

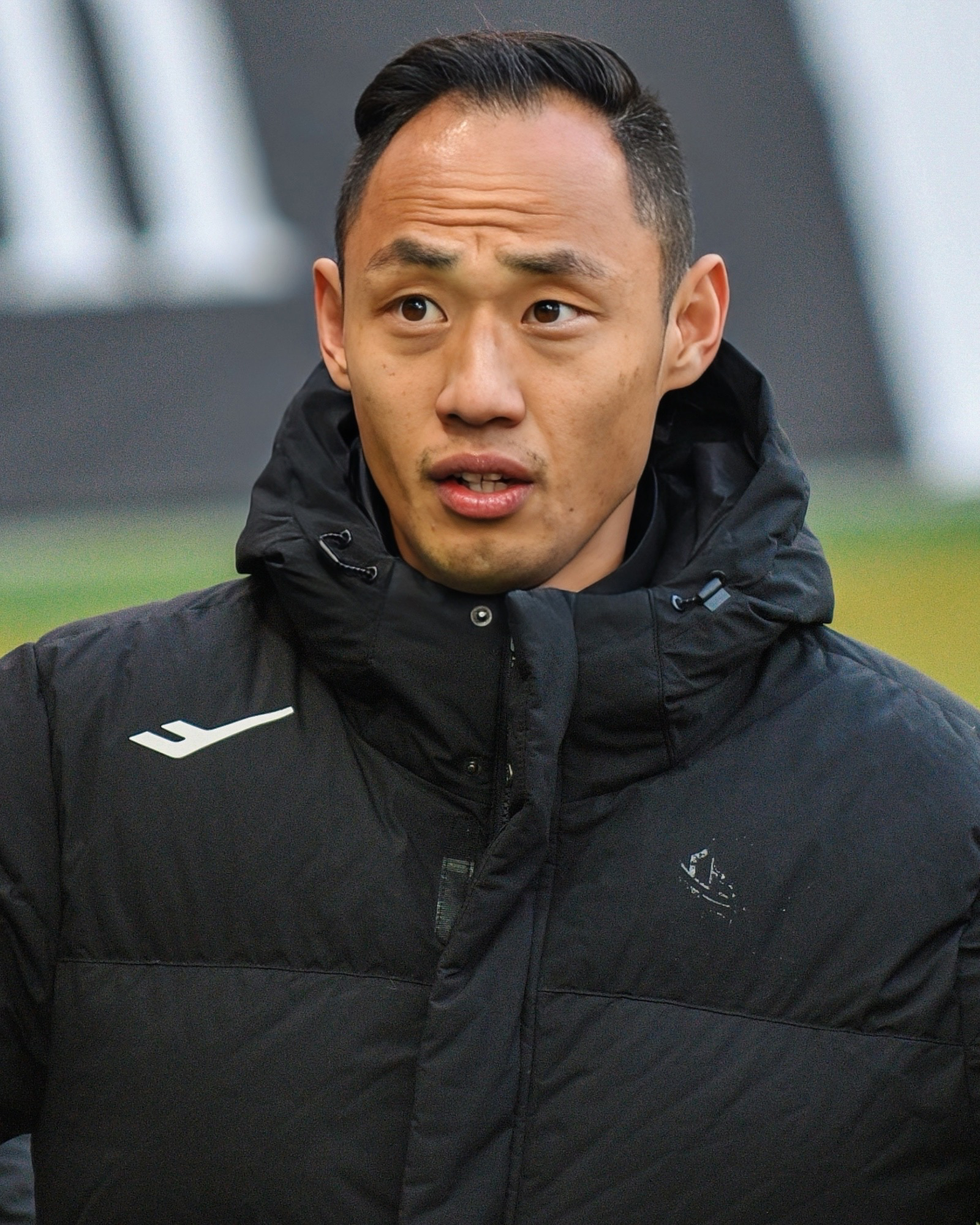
- Moon in 2025

Personal information
- Date of birth: 9 June 1992 (age 34)
- Place of birth: Seoul, South Korea
- Height: 1.73 m (5 ft 8 in)
- Position: Winger

Team information
- Current team: FC Seoul
- Number: 27

Youth career
- 2011: Nike Academy

Senior career*
| Years | Team | Apps | (Gls) |
| 2012–2015 | Östersunds FK | 81 | (10) |
| 2015 | → Djurgårdens IF (loan) | 10 | (1) |
| 2016 | Djurgårdens IF | 10 | (1) |
| 2017–2018 | Incheon United | 67 | (18) |
| 2019–2024 | Jeonbuk Hyundai Motors | 137 | (26) |
| 2020–2021 | → Gimcheon Sangmu (draft) | 21 | (5) |
| 2025– | FC Seoul | 68 | (11) |

International career^{‡}
| 2009 | South Korea U17 | 3 | (0) |
| 2018– | South Korea | 21 | (2) |
Medal record
Representing South Korea
Men's football
EAFF Championship
| Gold medal – first place | 2019 South Korea | Team |
- * Club domestic league appearances and goals as of 8 November 2026 ‡ National team caps and goals as of 15 July 2025

- Moon Seon-min
- Hangul: 문선민
- Hanja: 文宣民
- RR: Mun Seonmin
- MR: Mun Sŏnmin

Moon Seon-min (Korean: 문선민; Hanja: 文宣民; born 9 June 1992) is a South Korean professional footballer who plays as a winger for K League 1 club FC Seoul. He became the first football player from South Korea to play in Allsvenskan, the highest league in Sweden.

== Club career ==
=== Early career ===
Born in Seoul, South Korea, Moon began his football career at Janghoon High School in 2008 and spent two years there. After graduating high school in 2010, Moon's football career suffered a setback when there was no K League clubs offered him a contract and there wasn't an opportunity to join a college squad either. Moon had to pursued elsewhere when he took part in the Nike, Inc. sponsored competition "The Chance" in early 2011 and were among 100 players (later 32) to be selected for the next stage. He became one of the eight winners who got to move to England and join the Nike Academy that summer. While at the Nike Academy, Moon experienced training in a cold weather in England; opposite of the weather in South Korea.

=== Östersunds FK ===
Moon was signed by third tier Swedish club Östersunds FK on 26 January 2012, after their English manager Graham Potter spotted him while he was in his homeland to scout Ghanaian David Accam, who also was training with the Nike Academy at the time.

Moon made Östersunds FK debut, where he started the whole game, in a 1–1 draw against IK Sirius in the opening game of the season. He appeared in two more matches before being sidelined for a month with a toe injury. It wasn't until on 16 June 2012 when Moon made his return from injury, coming on as a 62nd-minute substitute, in a 1–0 loss against IK Frej. In a follow–up match against BK Forward, he scored his first goal for the club, in a 2–1 loss. Moon then scored his second goal of the season on 14 July 2012, in a 1–1 draw against Västerås SK. Since returning to the first team from injury, he regained his first team place and helped the side win the Division 1 Norra and promoted to the second tier Superettan in the 2012 season. At the end of the 2012 season, Moon went on to make twenty–five appearances and scoring two times in all competitions.

At the start of the 2013 season, Moon found himself competing for the first team place, appearing from the substitute bench. It wasn't until on 15 June 2013 when he scored his first goal of the season, in a 2–1 win against Ljungskile. His second goal of the season then came on 10 August 2013, in a 1–0 win against IK Brage. Following this, Moon regained his first team place in the starting line-up for the rest of the 2013 season. He went on to make twenty–five appearances and scoring two times in all competitions. Following the end of the 2013 season, Moon decided to move back home to South Korea due to homesickness. However, halfway into the preseason of 2014, he returned to Östersund and signed with the club again.

Moon started the 2014 season when he scored his first goal of the season, in a 3–0 win against Varbergs BoIS on 3 May 2014 and scored his second goal of the season seven days later on 10 May 2014, in a 3–2 win against Landskrona. Having started the season on the substitute bench, Moon soon regained his first team place in the starting line-up. A month later on 25 June 2014, he scored his third goal of the season, in a 2–1 loss against Ängelholm. Moon later scored two more goals in the 2014 season. Moon also contributed in assisting goals to six later in the 2014 season. Despite being sidelined on two occasions during the 2014 season, he went on to make twenty–five appearances and scoring five times in all competitions. For his performance, Moon was selected as the Östersunds Player of the Year by a Swedish website "FotbollZ" due to his performances.

At the start of the 2015 season, Moon started out the season, appearing on the substitute bench. It wasn't until on 5 May 2015 when he scored his first goal of the season, as well as, setting up the club's third goal of the game for Michael Omoh, who scored a hat–trick, in a 4–1 win against Syrianska. Up until his departure, Moon appeared in every match since the start of the season and made sixteen appearances and scoring once in all competitions.

=== Djurgårdens IF ===
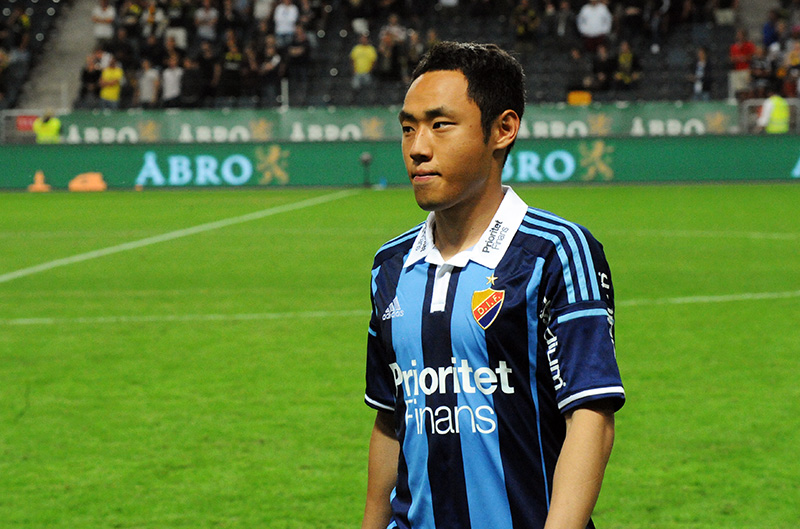
Moon pictured during his time at Djurgårdens IF.

On 17 July 2015, Moon was signed by Allsvenskan side Djurgårdens IF. The club had originally planned to sign him for the start of the 2016 Allsvenskan, but after a season-ending injury to their right winger Haris Radetinac they decided to loan him from Östersund for the rest of the year with an option to buy at the end of the loan.

Having appeared on the substitute bench for two matches, Moon made his Djurgårdens IF debut on 10 August 2015, where he played 71 minutes before being substituted, in a 1–0 loss against AIK. He then scored his first Djurgårdens IF goal, in a 4–2 win against Halmstad on 29 August 2015. Moon found his first team opportunities, as he appeared coming on from the substitute bench and made ten appearances and scoring once in all competitions. Nevertheless, the club were impressed with his performance and signed a permanent basis, signing a three–year contract.

At the start of the 2016 season, Moon began to be in a regular first team football, playing in the midfield position. It wasn't until on 2 May 2016 when Moon scored his first goal of the season, in a 3–0 win against his former club, Östersunds FK. However, his first team opportunities became limited later in the 2016 season, due to being on the substitute bench and facing his own injury concerns. Despite this, he went on to make eleven appearances and scoring once in all competitions. It was announced on 25 November 2016 that Moon had his contract terminated.

After leaving Sweden, Moon said he reflected his time in the country.

=== Incheon United ===
After his release by Djurgårdens IF, Moon returned to South Korea, signing for Incheon United on 8 December 2016. Upon joining the club, he said: "I thought that as a player, I haven't experienced Korean soccer yet. I decided to challenge the K-League when the opportunity came. At that time, I received a proposal from former director Kim Do-hoon and Incheon, and after that, director Ki-hyeong Lee also offered me a transfer offer. I was happy to take a flight to Korea." Moon was also appointed as the club's vice-captain.

Moon made his Incheon United debut on 18 March 2017 against Jeonbuk Hyundai Motors and played 81 minutes, as they drew 0–0. His debut performance was praised by the Korean media. In a follow–up match against Suwon Samsung Bluewings, he scored his first goals for the club, in a 3–3 draw. For his performance, Moon was named MVP Round Four of the 2017 season. Moon became a first team regular for the side, playing in the midfield position and quickly making an impact. Since the start of the season, Moon started in every match until he was dropped for one match against Gangwon on 16 July 2017, due to poor performance. His poor performance continued for the next two months, which saw him placed on the substitute bench. Despite this, Moon continued to regain his first team place and later helped the club avoid relegation. His goals against Jeonnam Dragons and Sangju Sangmu contributed Incheon United's stay in the K–League for another season.

Ahead of the 2018 season, Moon said that he needs to perform well to meet the club supporter's expectations. Moon then scored his first goals of the season, in a 3–2 win against Jeonbuk Hyundai Motors on 10 March 2018. For his performance, Moon was named MVP Round Two of the 2018 season. Since the start of the 2018 season, he continued regain his first team place for the side, playing in the left–wing and right–wing positions. Moon scored five goals throughout April, scoring against Jeju United, Suwon Samsung Bluewings and twice against Gyeongnam. After the conclusion of the World Cup, Moon scored on his return to the starting line-up for the side, and scored another goal, in a 3–3 draw against Jeonbuk Hyundai Motors on 7 July 2018. However, during the match, Moon suffered a hamstring injury and missed one match; which up until then, he played in every match since the start of the 2018 season. Moon returned to the first team from injury, starting the whole game, in a 3–0 loss against Gyeongnam on 14 July 2018. A week later against FC Seoul on 22 July 2018, Moon scored the winning goal in the 87th minute to win 2–1, ending the club's 16-games without a win. He continued to regain his first team for the rest of the 2018 season. A month later on 22 August 2018, Moon scored twice, scoring from the club's first and third goals, as well as, setting up the club's second goal, in a 3–1 win against Jeonnam Dragons. Following the match, he was named MVP Round Twenty–Five of the 2018 season for the second time. Later in the 2018 season, Moon scored three more goals for the side and helped the club avoid relegation once again. At the end of the 2018 season, he went on to make thirty–eight appearances and scoring fourteen times in all competitions.

=== Jeonbuk Hyundai Motors ===
On 15 January 2019, Jeonbuk Hyundai Motors officially signed Moon Sun-min. Moon Sun-min came to Jeonbuk as he was traded against Lee Jae-sung of Jeonbuk Hyundai Motors, who moved to the opposite direction. His departure from Incheon United disappointed the club's supporters. Upon joining Jeonbuk Hyundai Motors, he said joining the club would help him develop as a player and playing in the AFC Champions League. Moon later cited lack of recognition from Paulo Bento was reason of the transfer.

Moon made his Jeonbuk Hyundai Motors debut in the opening game of the season against Daegu as a 75th-minute substitute, in a 1–0 win. He scored his first goal in a follow–up match, in a 4–0 win against Suwon Samsung Bluewings. Four days later, on 13 March 2019, Moon made his AFC Champions League debut, where he played 30 minutes, in a 1–0 against Buriram United. At the start of the 2019 season, Moon found himself placed on the substitute bench, due to his struggling form. His second goal for the club came on 6 April 2019, in a 2–0 win against his former club, Incheon United. A month later on 29 May 2019, Moon scored twice for the club, in a 3–2 win against Gangwon. After the match, he was named MVP Round Fourteen of the 2019 season. This was followed up by scoring against Sangju Sangmu on 2 June 2019. Seventeen days later on 19 June 2019, Moon scored his first AFC Champions League goal, in a 1–1 draw against Shanghai SIPG in the first leg of the AFC Champions League Round of 16. Following the match, his goal was named both Goal and Top Player of the AFC Champions League Round of 16. However, in the second leg, he was sent–off in the last minutes of extra time for an unprofessional foul; the match went to penalty shootout and Jeonbuk Hyundai Motors lost 5–4. After the match, Moon apologised for his actions and said he should have been patient. Then on 10 July 2019, Moon scored his first hat–trick of his career, in a 4–1 win against Daegu. For the next two months, Moon later contributed for the club's matches by assisting several goals, which helped the side go on winning runs in aiming to be a title contenders. In a match against Suwon Samsung Bluewings on 26 September 2019, he came on as a late substitute in the 81st minute and scored the late goal, in a 2–0 win. A month later on 20 October 2019 against Pohang Steelers, Moon scored his eleventh goal of the season, as well as, setting up the opening goal of the game, in a 3–0 win. His goal against Pohang Steelers and performance earned October's Goal of the Month and October's Player of the Month respectively. After missing one match, Moon returned to the starting line-up against Gangwon in the last game of the season and played 85 minutes, as Jeonbuk Hyundai Motors won 1–0 to win the league for the third time consecutively. Moon finished his first season at Jeonbuk Hyundai Motors, making thirty–seven appearances and scoring eleven times in all competitions. For his performance, Moon dominated the 2019 K League Awards the following day, winning K League Top Assistor and K League Best XI. Sports G named Moon as the best signing of 2019.

=== Sangju Sangmu ===
Ahead of the 2020 season, it was announced that Moon joined Sangju Sangmu, a military club. He previously stated in an interview that he has intention to do military service.

== International career ==
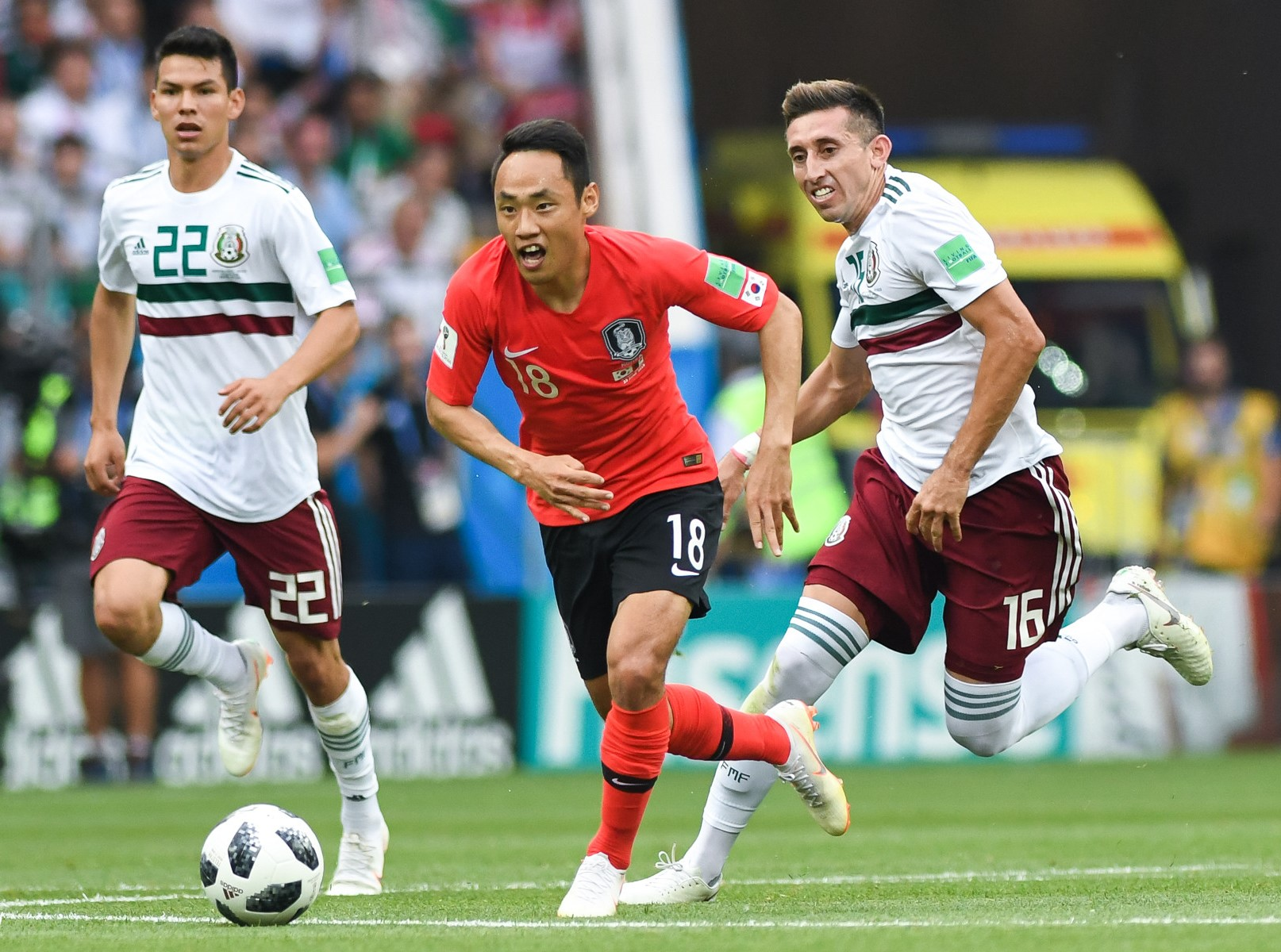
Moon dribbling the ball during South Korea's match against Mexico at the FIFA World Cup in Russia.

In March 2009, Moon was called up to the South Korea U-17 for the first time. He made his South Korea U17 debut, coming on as a 57th-minute substitute, in a 2–0 win against Nigeria U17 on 9 April 2009. Moon later made two more appearances for South Korea U17.

In May 2018, Moon was named in South Korea's preliminary 28 man squad for the 2018 FIFA World Cup in Russia. This was due to his impressive performance at Incheon United at the start of the 2018 season. He made his South Korea's debut against Honduras on 28 May 2018, coming on in the 56th minute and scoring the national side's second goal of the game, in a 2–0 win. Moon appeared in the next two matches, both coming on as a substitute. He eventually made to the 23 man squad. After missing two matches due to an injury and saw him placed on the substitute bench, Moon made his World Cup debut against Mexico on 23 June 2018, and played 77 minutes before being substituted, as South Korea lost 2–1. Following the match, Osen gave Moon's performance a 6.5 points, due to being actively involved in the frontline counterattack situation. He made another World Cup appearance, coming against Germany and played 69 minutes before being substituted, in a 2–0 win on 27 June 2018, but South Korea was eliminated in the group stage tournament, finishing third place and made two appearances. Following the tournament, Best Eleven evaluated Moon's performance, especially against Germany.

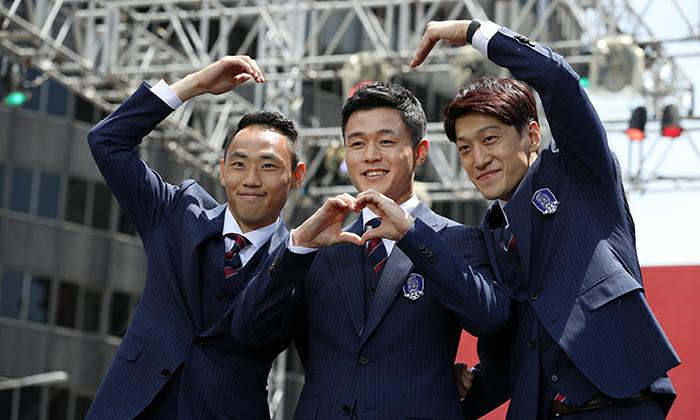
Moon (left) pictured with Lee Chung-yong and Ju Se-jong at the ceremony held at the Seoul Plaza.

Two months later in late–August, Moon was called up to the national squad once again. He made an appearance for the side, playing 22 minutes, in a 2–0 win against Costa Rica on 7 September 2018. Two months later on 20 November 2018, Moon scored his second goal for the national side, in a 4–0 win against Uzbekistan. A month later, however, he was cut from the 23-man squad ahead of the Asian Cup in Qatar. A year later, Moon was called up to the national team for the EAFF E-1 Football Championship as South Korea was the tournament host. He appeared in every match for the national side in the tournament, as South Korea won the EAFF E-1 Football Championship after winning all three matches.

== Personal life ==
Since playing in South Korea, Moon earned a nickname: 'Wolmido Azar'. Growing up, he cited FIFA World Cup In South Korea and Japan as the reason that made him want to be a footballer. During his time abroad, Moon is fluent in English and understand some Swedish.

In June 2018, Moon announced his marriage to Oh Hye-ji, a long time supporter of Incheon United. Together, they have a daughter. Moon said the birth of his daughter made him feel more responsible.

== Career statistics ==
=== Club ===
As of match played 8 November 2026

Appearances and goals by club, season and competition
| Club | Season | League | | | National cup (Note: Includes Svenska Cupen, Korea Cup) | | Continental | | Other | | Total | |
| Club | Season | Division | Apps | Goals | Apps | Goals | Apps | Goals | Apps | Goals | Apps | Goals |
|---|---|---|---|---|---|---|---|---|---|---|---|---|
| Östersunds FK | 2012 | Swedish Division 1 | 15 | 2 | 1 | 0 | — | | — | | 16 | 2 |
| Östersunds FK | 2013 | Superettan | 25 | 2 | — | | — | | — | | 25 | 2 |
| Östersunds FK | 2014 | Superettan | 25 | 5 | — | | — | | — | | 25 | 5 |
| Östersunds FK | 2015 | Superettan | 16 | 1 | — | | — | | — | | 16 | 1 |
| Östersunds FK | Total | | 81 | 10 | 1 | 0 | — | | — | | 82 | 10 |
| Djurgårdens IF (loan) | 2015 | Allsvenskan | 10 | 1 | — | | — | | — | | 10 | 1 |
| Djurgårdens IF | 2016 | Allsvenskan | 10 | 1 | 1 | 0 | — | | — | | 11 | 1 |
| Incheon United | 2017 | K League 1 | 30 | 4 | 1 | 0 | — | | — | | 31 | 4 |
| Incheon United | 2018 | K League 1 | 37 | 14 | 1 | 0 | — | | — | | 38 | 14 |
| Incheon United | Total | | 67 | 18 | 2 | 0 | — | | — | | 69 | 18 |
| Jeonbuk Hyundai Motors | 2019 | K League 1 | 32 | 10 | 0 | 0 | 5 (Note: Appearances in AFC Champions League Elite) | 1 | — | | 37 | 11 |
| Jeonbuk Hyundai Motors | 2021 | K League 1 | 19 | 3 | 0 | 0 | — | | — | | 19 | 3 |
| Jeonbuk Hyundai Motors | 2022 | K League 1 | 23 | 1 | 2 | 0 | 9 | 3 | — | | 34 | 4 |
| Jeonbuk Hyundai Motors | 2023 | K League 1 | 34 | 6 | 4 | 1 | 6 | 4 | — | | 44 | 11 |
| Jeonbuk Hyundai Motors | 2024 | K League 1 | 29 | 6 | 1 | 0 | 5 (Note: Three appearances in AFC Champions League Elite, two appearances and three goals in AFC Champions League Two) | 3 | 2 (Note: Appearances in K League promotion/relegation playoffs) | 1 | 37 | 10 |
| Jeonbuk Hyundai Motors | Total | | 137 | 26 | 7 | 1 | 25 | 11 | 2 | 1 | 171 | 39 |
| Gimcheon Sangmu (draft) | 2020 | K League 1 | 20 | 5 | 0 | 0 | — | | — | | 20 | 5 |
| Gimcheon Sangmu (draft) | 2021 | K League 2 | 1 | 0 | 0 | 0 | — | | — | | 1 | 0 |
| Gimcheon Sangmu (draft) | Total | | 21 | 5 | 0 | 0 | — | | — | | 21 | 5 |
| FC Seoul | 2025 | K League 1 | 35 | 6 | 2 | 0 | 6 | 0 | — | | 43 | 6 |
| FC Seoul | 2026 | K League 1 | 33 | 5 | 1 | 0 | 7 (Note: Four appearances in AFC Champions League Elite, three appearances and two goals in AFC Champions League Two) | 2 | — | | 41 | 7 |
| FC Seoul | Total | | 68 | 11 | 3 | 0 | 13 | 2 | — | | 84 | 13 |
| Career total | | | 394 | 72 | 14 | 1 | 38 | 13 | 2 | 1 | 448 | 87 |

=== International ===
As of match played 15 July 2025

Appearances and goals by national team and year
| National team | Year | Apps | Goals |
|---|---|---|---|
South Korea
| South Korea | 2018 | 11 | 2 |
| South Korea | 2019 | 3 | 0 |
| South Korea | 2023 | 2 | 0 |
| South Korea | 2024 | 1 | 0 |
| South Korea | 2025 | 4 | 0 |
| Total | | 21 | 2 |

Scores and results list South Korea's goal tally first, score column indicates score after each Moon goal.

List of international goals scored by Moon Seon-min
| No. | Date | Venue | Opponent | Score | Result | Competition |
|---|---|---|---|---|---|---|
| 1 | 28 May 2018 | Daegu Stadium, Daegu, South Korea | Honduras | 2–0 | 2–0 | Friendly |
| 2 | 20 November 2018 | Queensland Sport and Athletics Centre, Brisbane, Australia | Uzbekistan | 3–0 | 4–0 | Friendly |

== Honours ==
Östersunds FK

- Swedish Division 1 Norra: 2012

Jeonbuk Hyundai Motors

- K League 1: 2019, 2021
- Korean FA Cup: 2022

Gimcheon Sangmu

- K League 2: 2021

FC Seoul

- K League 1: 2026

South Korea

- EAFF Championship: 2019

Individual

- K League 1 top assist provider: 2019
- K League 1 Best XI: 2019
