= Erik Figueroa =

Swedish footballer

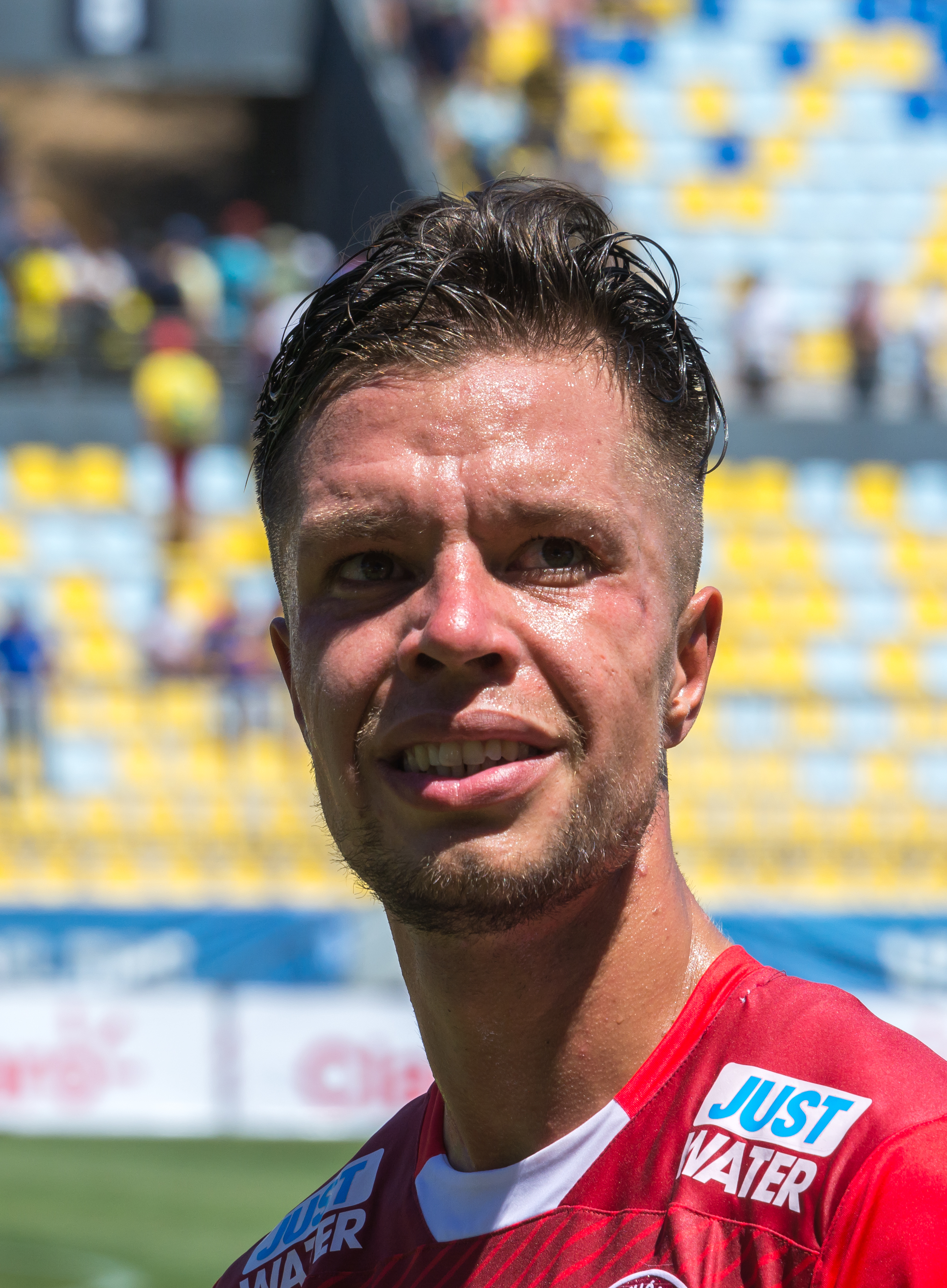

Personal information
- Date of birth: 4 January 1991 (age 35)
- Place of birth: Sundbyberg, Sweden
- Height: 1.83 m (6 ft 0 in)
- Position: Defender

Team information
- Current team: Vasalund IF
- Number: 5

Youth career
- AIK

Senior career*
Years	Team	Apps	(Gls)
2009–2011	Hammarby TFF	58	(4)
2011–2013	Hammarby IF	58	(2)
2014	Vasalund IF	24	(1)
2015	IK Sirius	22	(4)
2016	AFC Eskilstuna	26	(0)
2017–2018	IF Brommapojkarna	54	(4)
2019	Unión La Calera	11	(0)
2020	Helsingborgs IF	10	(0)
2021	Akropolis	23	(2)
2022–	Vasalund IF	53	(1)
- * Club domestic league appearances and goals as of 1 August 2024

Erik Figueroa (born 4 January 1991) is a Swedish footballer who plays for Vasalund IF.

== Career ==
=== Club career ===
Figueroa grew up in Sundbyberg. He played for AIK during his youth years. On his 20th birthday, he signed a professional contract with Hammarby IF after previously playing in the cooperation club Hammarby IF. Figueroa left Hammarby after the 2013 season when the club decided to not extend his contract.

On 25 February 2014, Figueroa signed with Division 1 club Vasalund IF. Before the 2015 season, he moved to IK Sirius.

In December 2016, Figueroa was recruited by IF Brommapojkarna, where he signed a two-year contract. On 9 January 2019, Figueroa was joined Chilean club Unión La Calera. On 20 January 2020, Figueroa then moved back to Sweden and joined Helsingborgs IF, where he signed a one-year contract.

On 20 March 2021, Figuero signed with Akropolis.

== Personal life ==
His mother is Swedish and his father is Chilean. Figueroa is a dual national; he holds a Swedish EU passport as well as a Chilean passport.
