= Niclas Andersén (footballer) =

Swedish footballer

Personal information
- Date of birth: 5 August 1992 (age 34)
- Place of birth: Sweden
- Height: 1.72 m (5 ft 8 in)
- Position: Left-back

Youth career
- Götaholms BK
- IFK Göteborg

Senior career*
Years	Team	Apps	(Gls)
2010–2011	IFK Göteborg	1	(0)
2012-2015	Ljungskile SK	101	(1)
2016	BK Häcken	1	(0)
2017–2023	GAIS	156	(2)
2024	Hovås Billdal	9	(3)

International career
2010–2011	Sweden U19	12	(0)
- * Club domestic league appearances and goals

Niclas Andersén (born 5 August 1992) is a Swedish former footballer who mainly played as a left-back.

Andersén have played two Allsvenskan games, one for IFK Göteborg in 2010 and one for BK Häcken in 2016. Besides four seasons for Ljungskile SK, he has only represented clubs in Gothenburg, Sweden.
