= David Engström =

Swedish footballer

Personal information
- Full name: Carl David Engström
- Date of birth: 7 August 1990 (age 36)
- Place of birth: Västerås, Sweden
- Height: 1.89 m (6 ft 2 in)
- Position: Centre back

Team information
- Current team: Västerås SK
- Number: 5

Youth career
- Irsta IF
- Gideonsbergs IF
- 2007–2008: Västerås SK

Senior career*
| Years | Team | Apps | (Gls) |
| 2009–2010 | Västerås SK | 5 | (0) |
| 2010–2011 | Västerås IK | 28 | (1) |
| 2012–2014 | Moheda IF | 42 | (10) |
| 2015–2017 | IFK Värnamo | 52 | (10) |
| 2017 | BK Häcken | 5 | (0) |
| 2018–2019 | Örgryte IS | 48 | (9) |
| 2020– | Västerås SK | 48 | (1) |
- * Club domestic league appearances and goals as of 2 June 2023

Carl David Engström (born 7 August 1990) is a Swedish footballer who plays for Västerås SK in Superettan as a defender.
