= List of events at Tele2 Arena =

Tele2 Arena is a multi-purpose stadium in Stockholm Globe City, located in Johanneshov, just south of Stockholm City Centre, Sweden, that was open in July 2013. The following is a complete list of all events that have been or will be held at the arena. In addition, the stadium is used as the home venue of the football teams Djurgårdens IF and Hammarby IF.

== 2013 ==
Date	Event	Attendance	Type	Details	Ref
27 July	Gyllene Tider	23,082	Concert	2013 Tour	
24 August	Kent, Lars Winnerbäck, Robyn	39,714	Concert	Inauguration concerts	
7 September	Tyresö Royal Crowns – Kristianstad Predators	unknown	American football	2013 Swedish U19 Championship FInal	
7 September	Stockholm Mean Machines – Arlanda Jets	220	American football	2013 Swedish Women's Championship FInal	
7 September	Örebro Black Knights – Carlstad Crusaders	4,032	American football	2013 Swedish Championship FInal	
16 November	Nitro Circus Live	11,000	Show		
26 November	Volbeat	9,152	Concert	Outlaw Gentlemen & Shady Ladies Live 2013	
30 November	LIGHTS – Winter Illuminate	18,000	Concert	Dance festival	
5 December	Julgalan 2013		Show		
6 December	Julgalan 2013		Show		
7 December	Julgalan 2013		Show		

== 2014 ==
Date	Event	Attendance	Type	Details	Ref
10 January	Hammarby IF – Sandvikens AIK	11,890	Bandy	2013–14 Elitserien	
28 February	Avicii	35,000	Concert	True Tour	
1 March	Avicii	40,000	Concert	True Tour	
10 May	Justin Timberlake	26,602	Concert	The 20/20 Experience World Tour	
1 June	Aerosmith		Concert	Global Warming Tour	

== Sources ==
- Tele2 Arena official site
- Swedish Football Association
- Swedish Bandy Association
