= Hovet =

Indoor ice hockey venue in Stockholm, Sweden

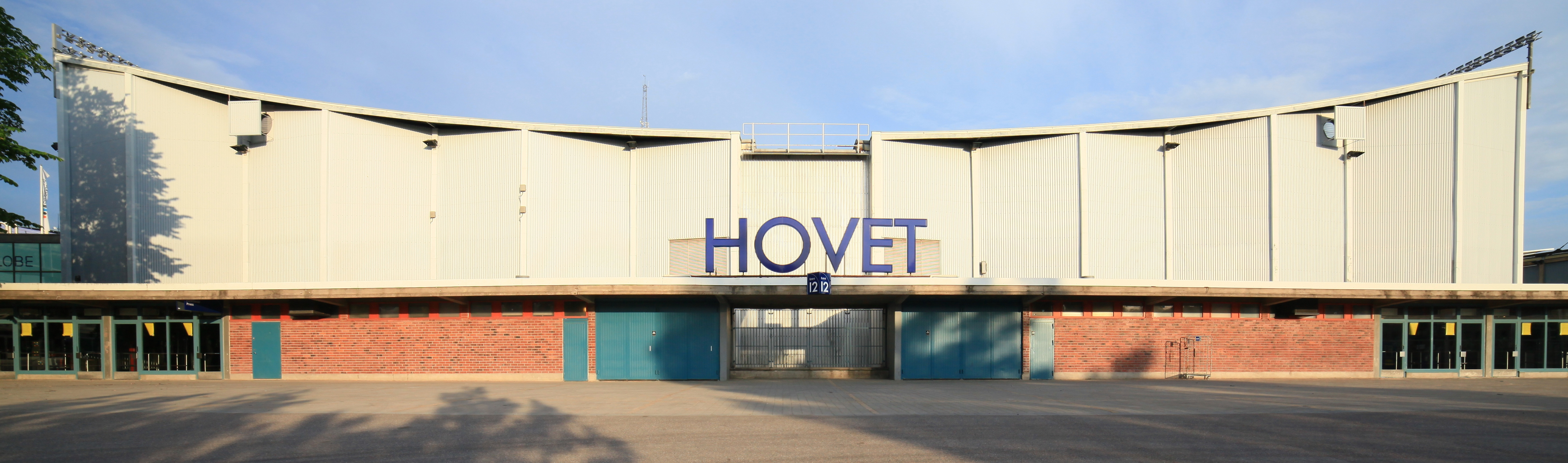
- Interactive map of Hovet
- Former names: Johanneshovs Isstadion (1955–2000)
- Location: Johanneshov, Stockholm
- Coordinates: 59°17′41.5″N 18°4′55″E
- Owner: City of Stockholm via SGA Fastigheter
- Operator: AEG Live / ASM Gobal
- Capacity: 8,094

Construction
- Opened: 4 November 1955
- Renovated: 2002
- Expanded: 1962
- Architect: Paul Hedqvist

Tenants
- AIK IF (HockeyAllsvenskan); Djurgårdens IF (SHL); Djurgårdens IF Dam (SDHL); Hammarby IF (1955–2008)

Website
- Venue website

Hovet (formerly known as Johanneshovs Isstadion or, in English: Johanneshov Ice Stadium) is an arena located in the Johanneshov district of Stockholm (Stockholm Globe City) which is mainly used for ice hockey, concerts and corporate events. It was opened in 1955 as an outdoor arena; a roof was added in 1962, and the arena interior underwent major renovation in 2002. The arena's main tenants are ice hockey clubs AIK and Djurgårdens IF. The official capacity is 8,094 spectators for ice hockey events and 8,300 during concerts.

== History ==
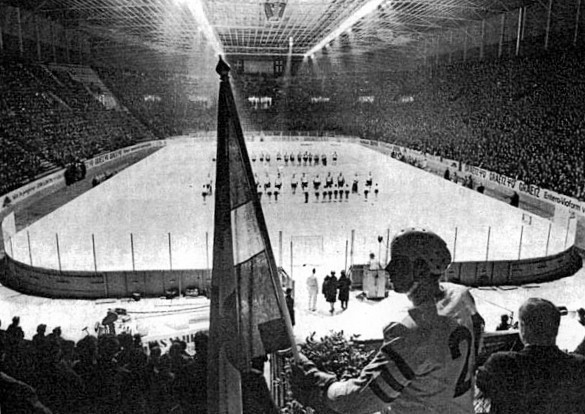
Hovet in November 1962

The arena was officially inaugurated on 4 November 1955 with an ice hockey game between Sweden and Norway, which Sweden won 7–2. The original designer was Swedish architect Paul Hedqvist. A roof was added for the 1963 World Ice Hockey Championships. During the autumn of 2002, every chair was replaced and a restaurant area was added at one of the short ends.

=== Future ===
In early 2016, plans were announced for a demolition of the arena in 2020 or later, and a renovation of Globen to better adapt to ice hockey, and to create wider space for residential buildings. The decision to demolish was made by SGA Fastigheter on 8 November 2017. On 20 June 2022, Stockholm Municipality finally announced that the arena will be demolished, as well as plans to refurbish the Avicii Arena. The ice hockey arena is expected to be demolished in the late 2020s, and in its place an underground ice hockey rink is expected to be built.

However, on 8 October 2025, it was reported that the municipality had reversed its decision and will instead investigate the possibilities of preserving the arena in 2026. In June 2026, it was reported that a new modern indoor arena will be built to replace the current venue, either in its place or relocated to the nearby site of the former Söderstadion, as part of wider redevelopment plans.

== Events ==
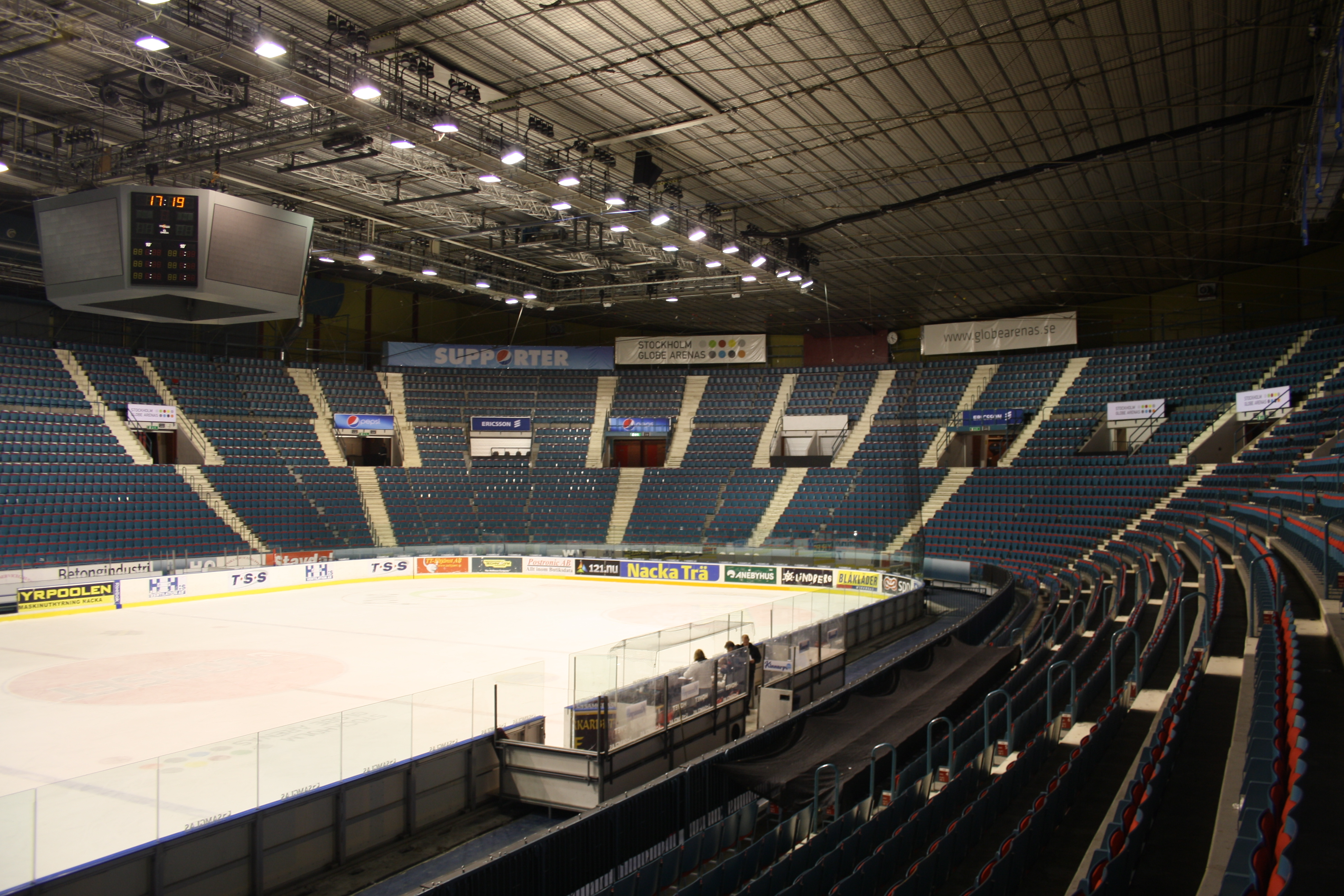
Interior of Hovet in February 2011

Other than AIK and Djurgårdens IF, Hovet has been the regular home arena in different periods for IK Göta, IFK Stockholm, Stureby SK, Mälarhöjden/Västertorp, Brinkens IF, AC Camelen, and Hammarby IF. Since its inaugural year in 2008, Bajen Fans IF, renamed Hammarby IF after the former club, plays one game annually at Hovet. The 2015 Summer European League of Legends Championship Series finals were played at the Hovet.

In May 2016, Hovet was used as the press centre for the 2016 Eurovision Song Contest, which was taking place next door in Globen. The flat ice rink area was covered making way for the press working area, accredited fan zone, filming and radio studios, and a press conference arena.

== See also ==
- Avicii Arena
- 3Arena
- List of indoor arenas in Sweden
- List of indoor arenas in Nordic countries
