= Kingsize =

Kingsize or King size may refer to:

- Bed size
- A size of cigarettes and rolling paper
- Kingsize (The Boo Radleys album), 1998
- Kingsize (Five album), 2001
- King Size (B. B. King album), 1977
- King Size!, a 1959 album by André Previn
- King-Size Homer, the seventh episode of The Simpsons' seventh season
- Kingsize Soundlabs, a recording studio in Silver Lake, California
- "Kingsize (You're My Little Steam Whistle)", a song by Haircut 100 from Pelican West
- "King Size", a song by Anthrax from Stomp 442
- King Syze, underground rapper from hip hop supergroup Army of the Pharaohs
- Kingsize Magazine, a hip-hop magazine in Scandinavia

== See also ==
- Kingsajz, a 1987 Polish film
- "King Size Bed", an unreleased song by Peach PRC
