= Uggleviksreservoaren =

Coordinates: 59°21′6″N 18°04′45″E

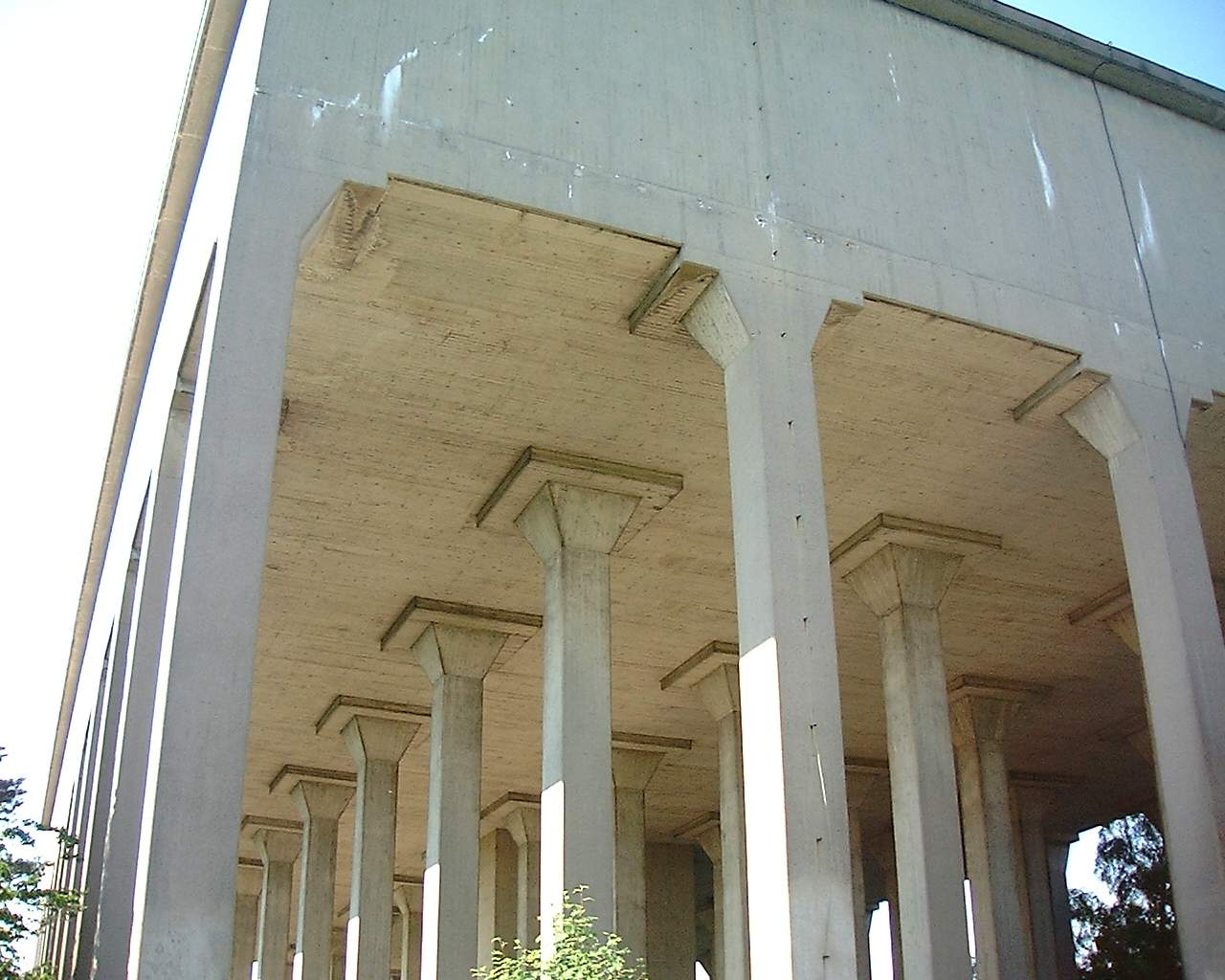
Uggleviksreservoaren

Uggleviksreservoaren (Swedish: The "Uggleviken Reservoir") is a water reservoir located in the forest Lilljansskogen near Uggleviken, a fen at Norra Djurgården in north-eastern central Stockholm, Sweden.

The concrete structure, design by architect Paul Hedqvist and built in 1935, is composed of 64 pillars, each of 1×1 metre cross section and 14 metres tall, carrying the uninsulated tank of 78×39×6 metres, containing 18 thousand cubic metres, crowned by a small lantern. One of the most prominent landmarks in central Stockholm observable from elevated locations kilometres away, the classical structure has a monumentality further amplified by its elevated location in a forest remote from any other buildings. It is one of few remaining, visible traces of the ambitious municipal projects carried through in the early 20th century, still witnessing the restraints and possibilities of casting techniques anticipating pre-stressed concrete and slipform constructions.
