= Paul Hedqvist =

Swedish architect

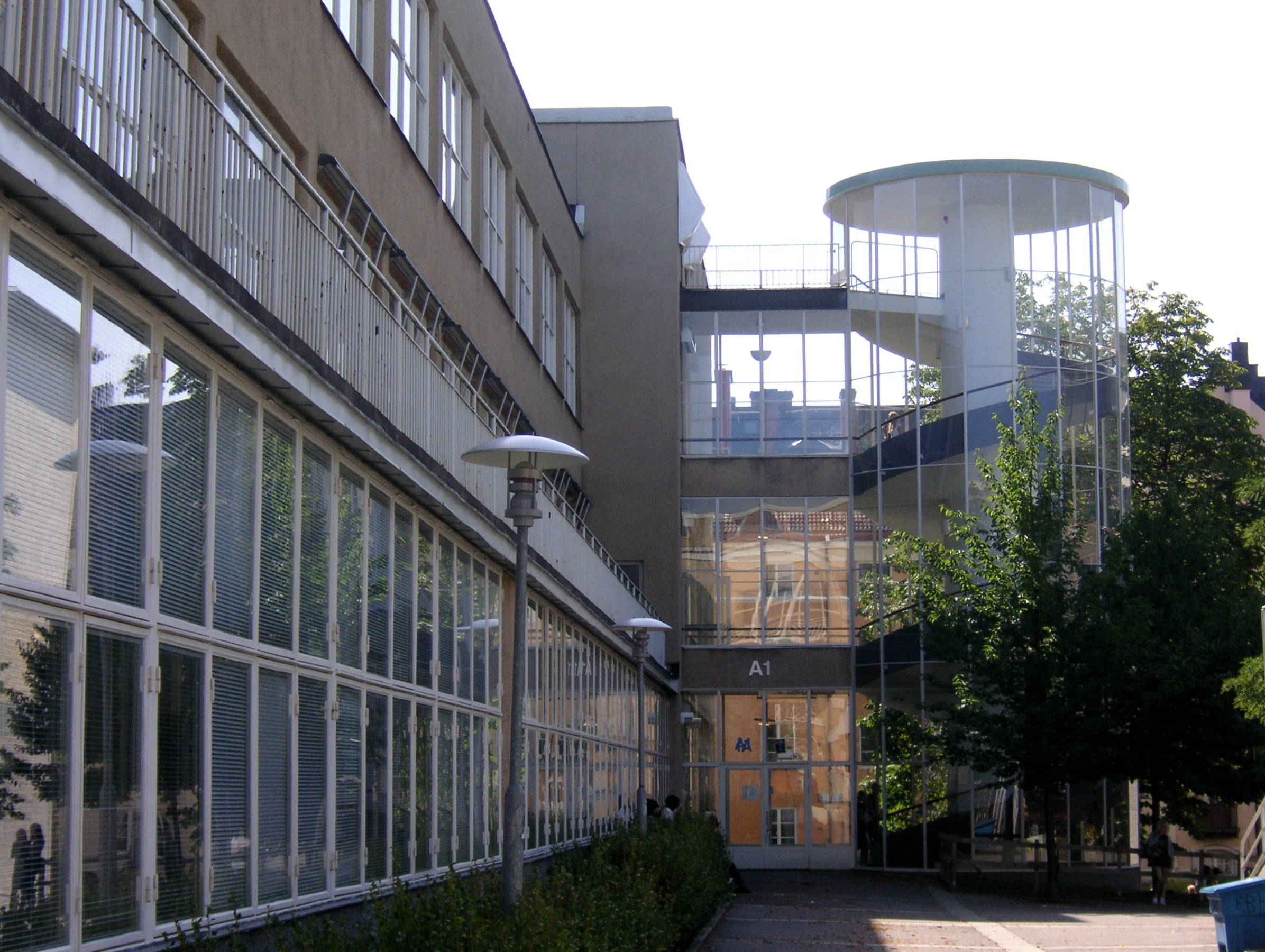
St. Erik's Gymnasium in Stockholm

Paul Hedqvist (21 July 1895 Stockholm - 23 June 1977) was a Swedish modernist architect with many official commissions in Sweden through the 1930s, including housing projects, major bridges, many schools, and urban planning work. His practice evolved into designing office towers and at least one major stadium in the postwar 1950s. At one point he served as the city architect of Stockholm.

== Biography ==
Hedqvist studied at the KTH Royal Institute of Technology in Stockholm and worked for Ragnar Östberg before opening his own office in 1924, with his partner David Dahl. Hedqvist became part of the functionalist movement developing in Sweden after Stockholm International Exhibition (1930), which he took part in. Through the war, from 1938 through 1948, he was professor at the Royal Swedish Academy of Fine Arts in Stockholm.

Hedqvist worked as a functionalist. Early in his career he took part in the 1930 Stockholm Housing Exhibition, organized by Gregor Paulsson, but Hedqvist chose not to join other Swedish architects in the "Accept!" movement. Instead he was awarded a good share of Sweden's high-profile state commissions in the 1930s, dams and housing projects and many schools and the Stockholm airport, working mainly in a rationalist style. There's evidence for a penchant for square proportions for window and facade design. The single most noticeable Modernist flourish is the brilliant cylindrical glass staircase for St. Erik's Gymnasium in Stockholm in 1939. Later in his career Hedqvist took credit for some of the tallest buildings in Sweden.

He was awarded the Prince Eugen Medal for architecture in 1954.

== Work ==
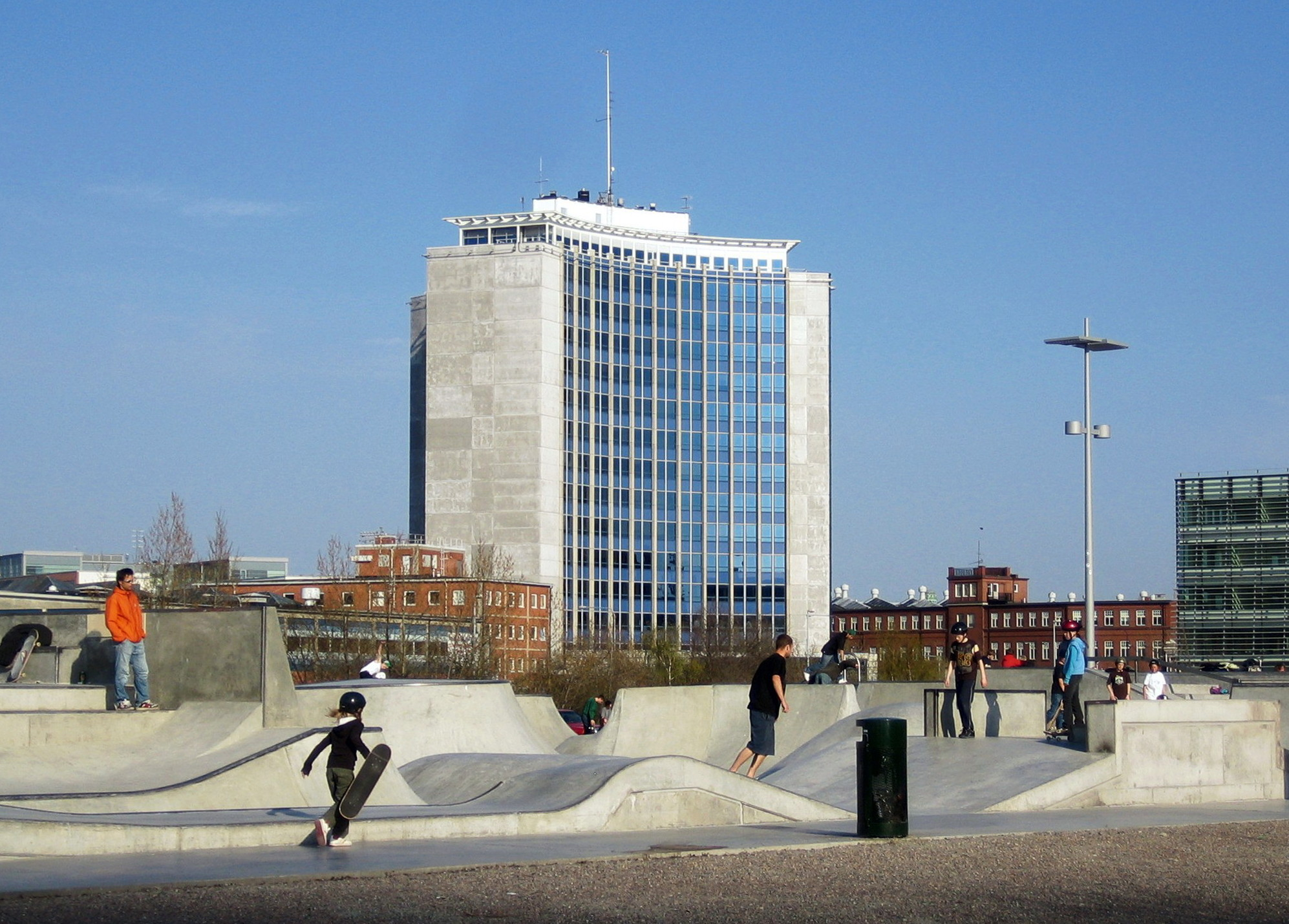
Kockums Building, Malmö, skatepark in the foreground

- a portion of the housing exhibition at the Stockholm International Exhibition (1930)
- municipal baths in Eskilstuna, 1932
- terraced housing, in Ålstensgatan, Bromma, 1932
- the poured-concrete Uggleviksreservoaren ("Uggleviken Reservoir"), in the forest Lilljansskogen near Lake Uggleviken at Norra Djurgården in north-eastern central Stockholm, 1935
- Västerbron and Tranebergsbron bridges, 1935
- a portion of the Röda Bergen housing project in Vasastaden, Stockholm, circa 1936
- main terminal and other structures, Stockholm-Bromma Airport, 1936
- St. Erik's Gymnasium (School), Kungsholmen, 1939, with its distinctive glass-cylinder exterior staircase
- the cable-supported Hovet stadium, formerly known as Johanneshovs Isstadion, Stockholm, 1955
- Kockums Building, Malmö, Skåne län, circa 1955
- the Skatteskrapan ("Tax Scraper") office building, Stockholm, 1959, now converted into student apartments
- the 27-floor slender landmark Dagens Nyheter Building, Stockholm, 1964, tallest building in Sweden from 1964 to 2003
- Biomedical Centre, Uppsala University, Uppsala, circa 1968

== Images ==
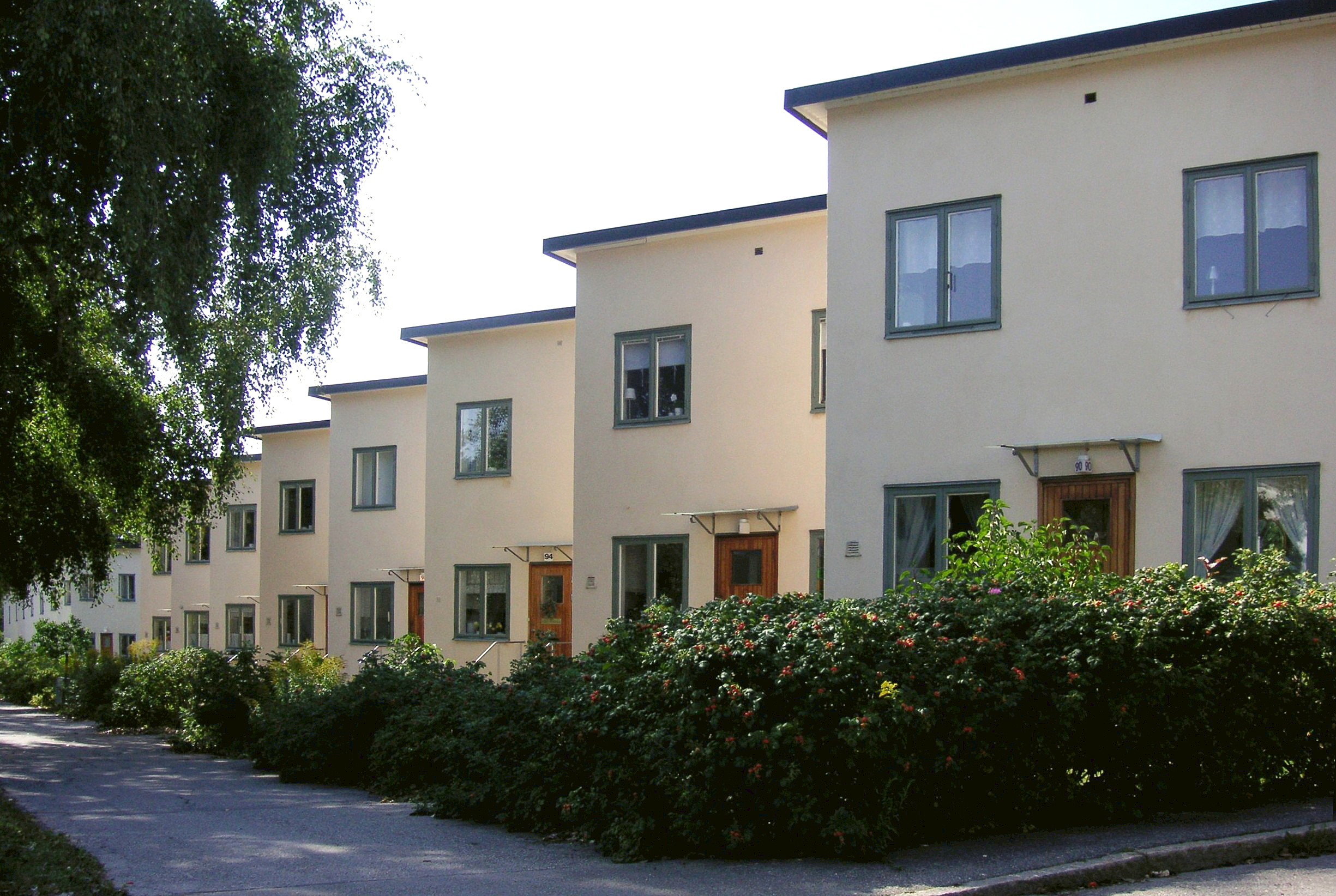
Ålstensgatan residences, in Bromma

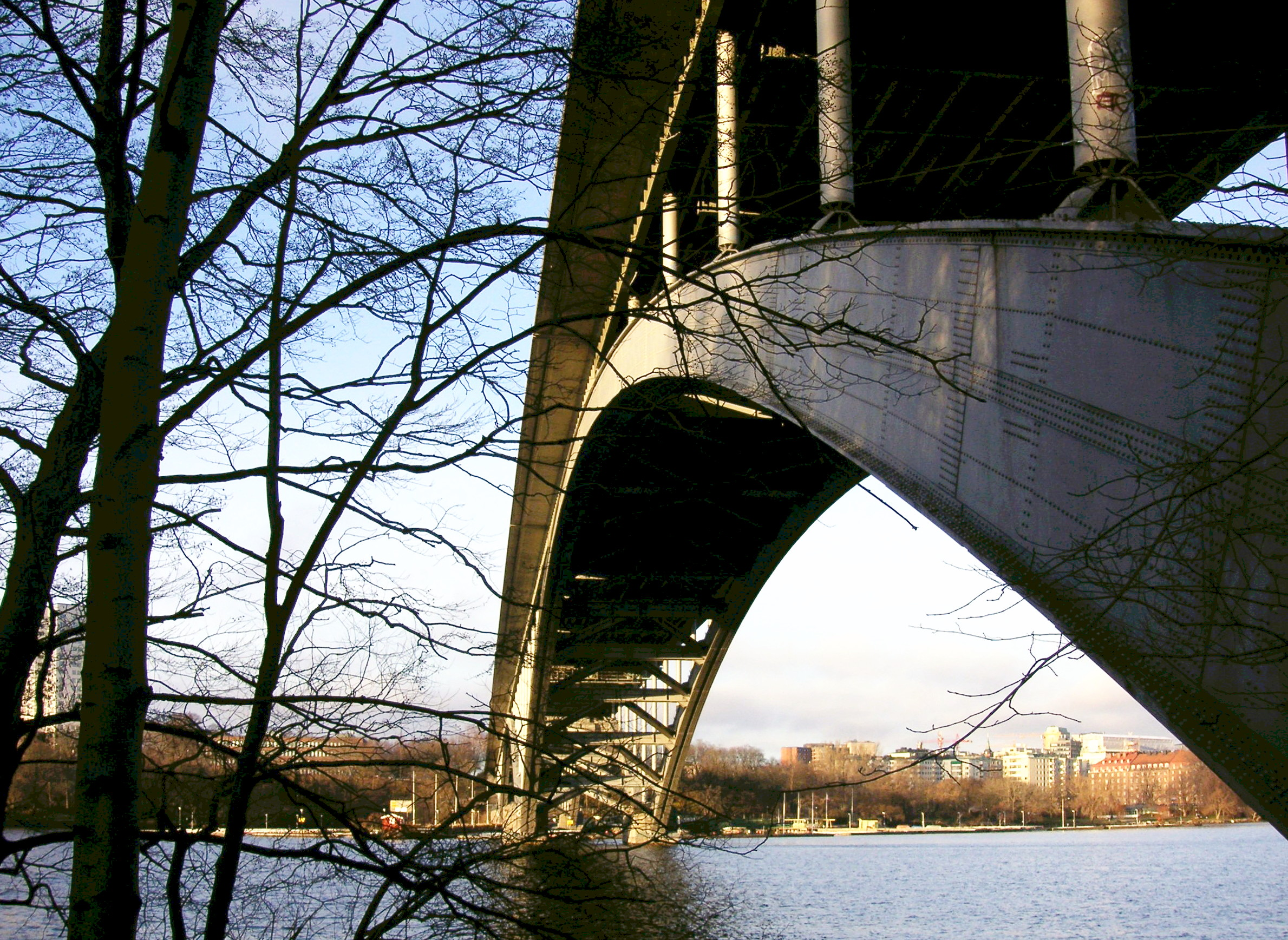
Västerbron

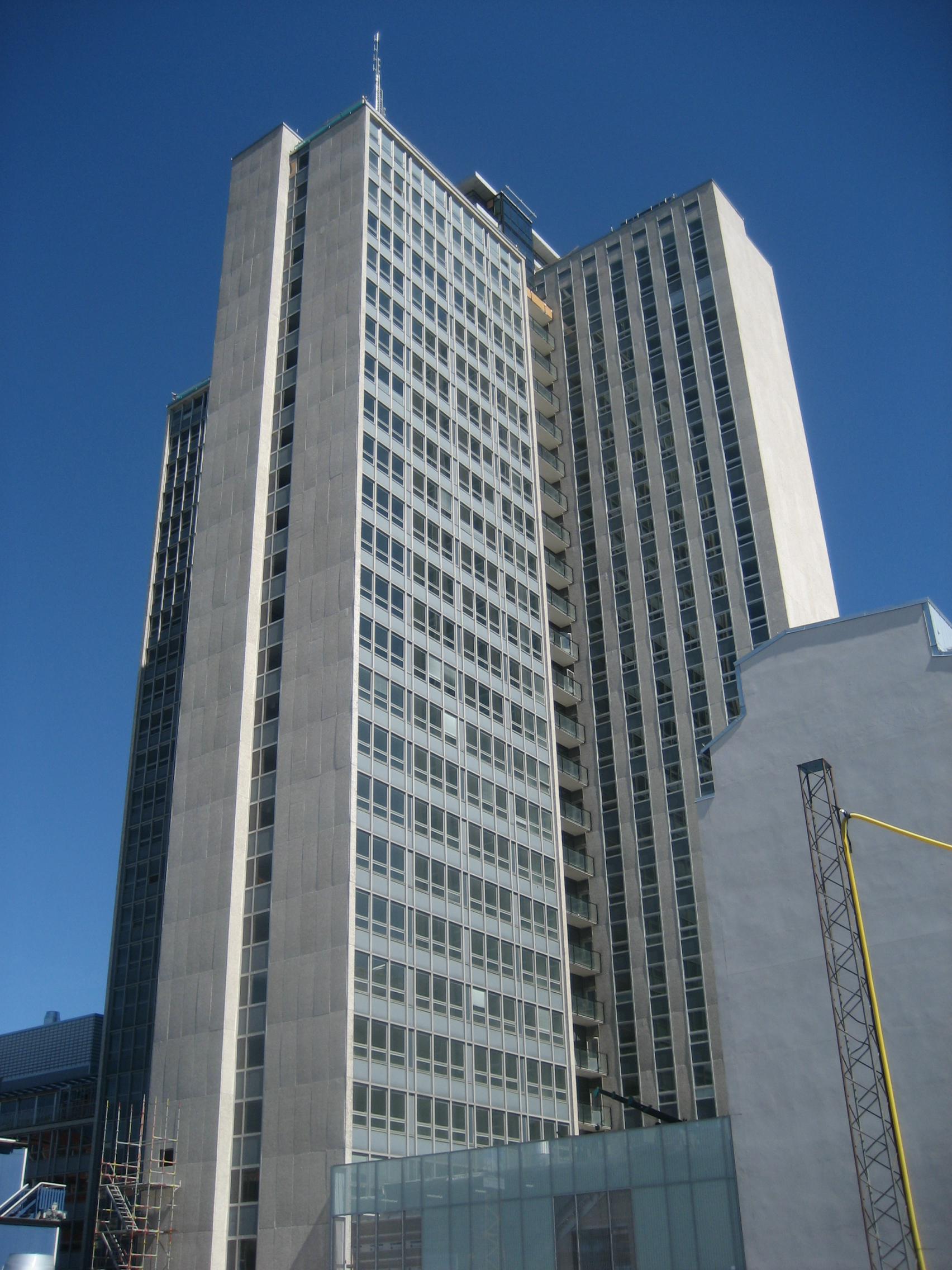
Skattehuset

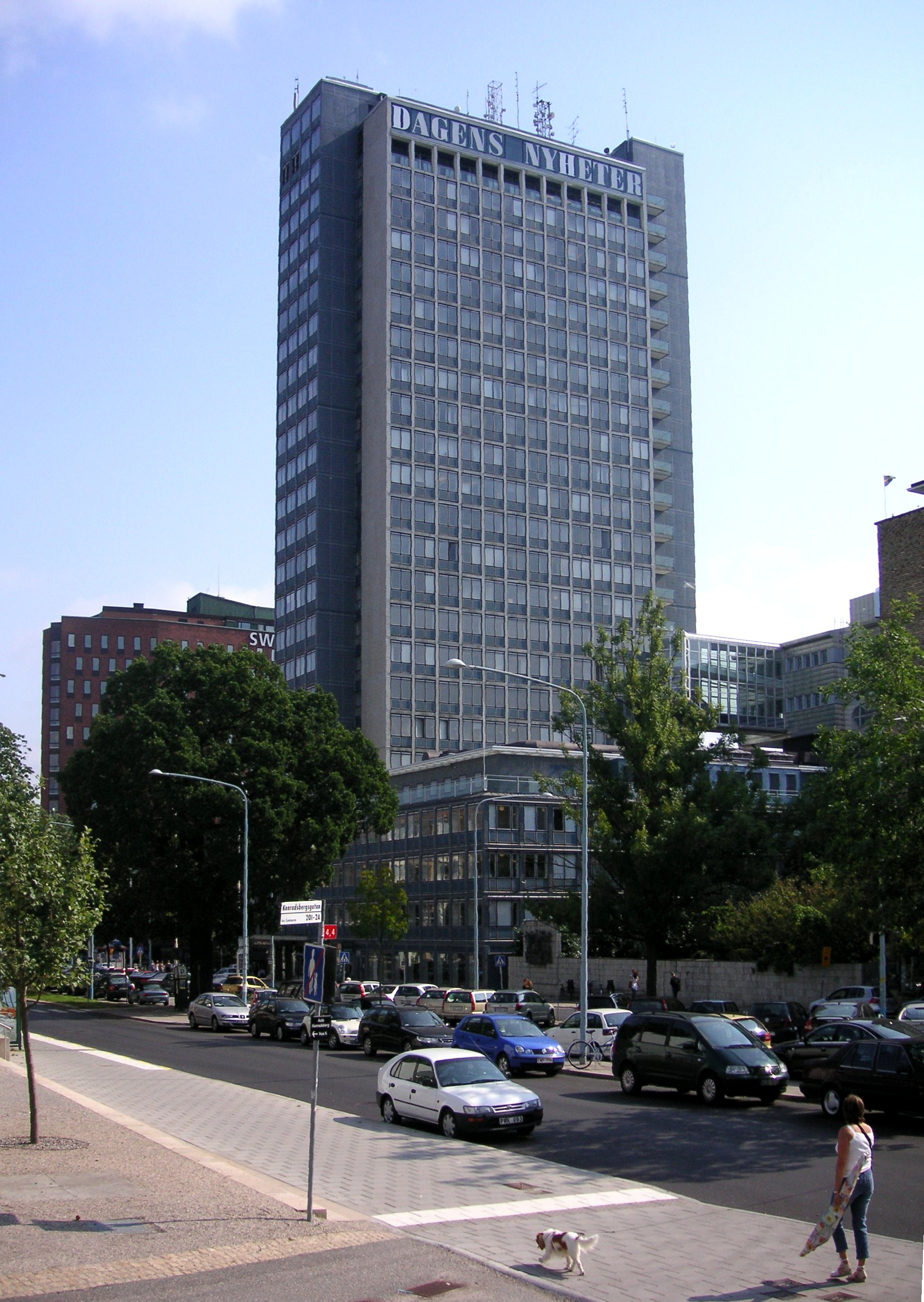
Dagens Nyheter Building, Stockholm
