= Kingsizegalan =

Annual Swedish music award

The Kingsizegalan is an annual music award hosted by the Swedish music magazine Kingsize Magazine. It mainly covers the hip hop music scene. Since 2014, the awards ceremony is broadcast live on TV4 Play. In 2015 the gala was hosted at the Annexet in Stockholm.
