= Annexet =

Venue in Stockholm, Sweden

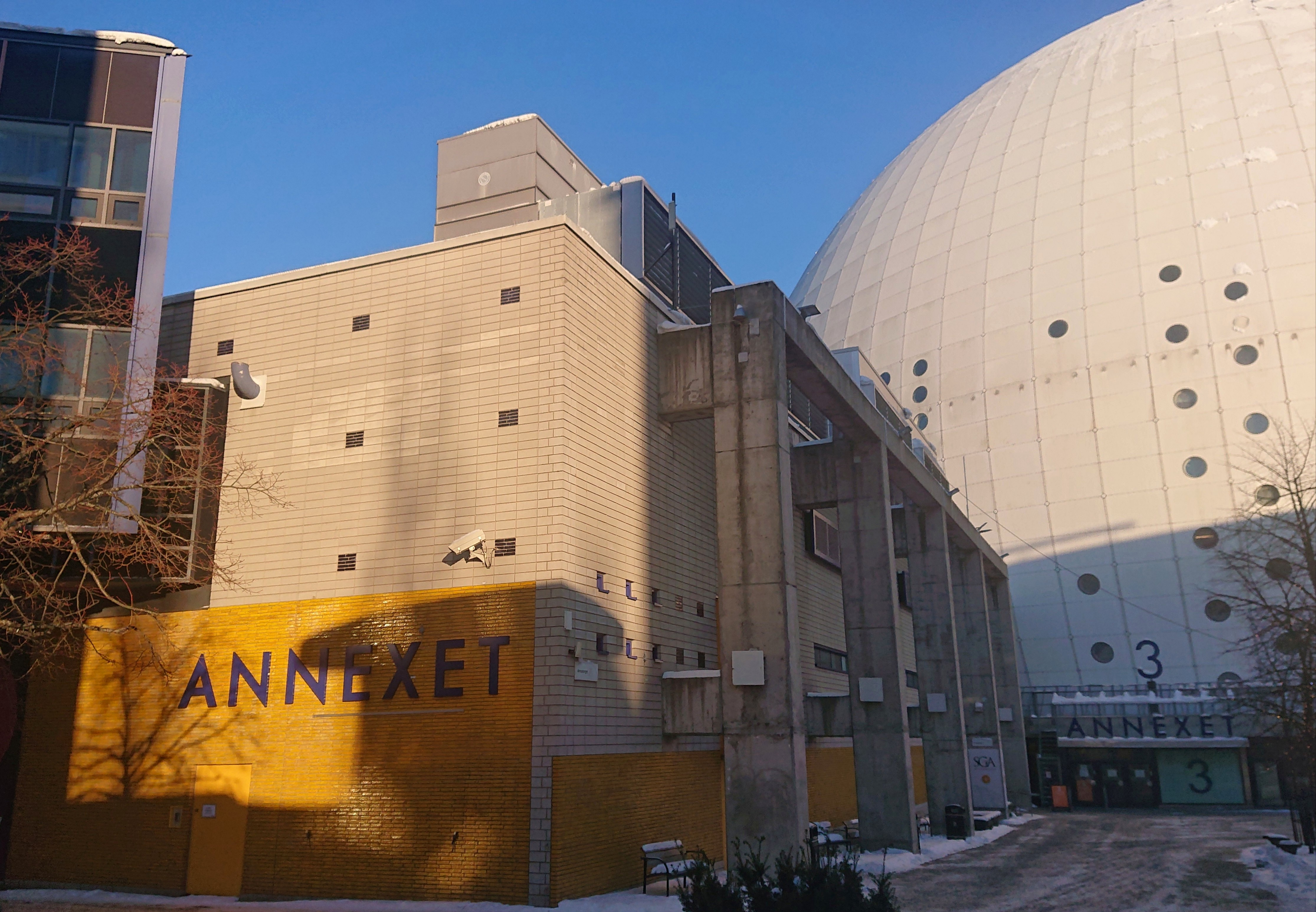
- The Annexet in February 2021
- Interactive map of Annexet
- Location: Johanneshov, Stockholm
- Coordinates: 59°17′38″N 18°4′53″E
- Owner: SGA Fastigheter / ASM Global
- Capacity: Concerts: 3,400 standing or 2,200 seated Corporate events: 2,000–3,400

Construction
- Opened: 19 February 1989
- Architect: Berg Arkitektkontor AB

The Annexet is one of the venues in Stockholm Globe City, located in Stockholm, Sweden. Used mainly for concerts and music festivals, but also the host of numerous cultural events, the venue opened in 1989 and has a capacity of 3,950 people. The venue has a long-running connection with the Eurovision Song Contest, having hosted related events in 2000, 2016 and 2021.

== Events ==
The Annexet was built as a training venue for ice hockey, and also hosts concerts, fairs and conferences. The firm Berg Arkitektkontor AB was responsible for the building's architecture. Artists that the venue has hosted in concert include Avril Lavigne, Good Charlotte, Lana Del Rey, Alice in Chains, Gavin DeGraw and Joakim Thåström.

Annexet was used to host the after-party at the Eurovision Song Contest 2000. When Sweden hosted the Eurovision Song Contest 2016, Annexet was chosen to be the location for the delegation area during the event. The Kingsizegalan hip hop festival was held at Annexet in 2015. The venue hosted the 2020 Musikhjälpen. Due to restrictions related to the COVID-19 pandemic, all shows of Melodifestivalen 2021, the competition to select Sweden's representative for the Eurovision Song Contest 2021, were held in the Annexet with no audience present, contrasting with the usual tour of arenas in various cities across Sweden.

In 2021, the Swedish Sports Awards were held in the Annexet instead of the usual venue, the Globe Arena, also due to COVID-19 restrictions. In January 2022 the venue hosted the awards for a second year. In May 2022 the Annexet hosted the Grammis, the national music awards for Sweden. It hosted again in 2023, 2024, and 2025.

== See also ==
- Ericsson Globe
- Stockholm Globe City
