= Lill-Jansskogen =

Park in Stockholm, Sweden

Coordinates: 59°21′05″N 18°04′45″E

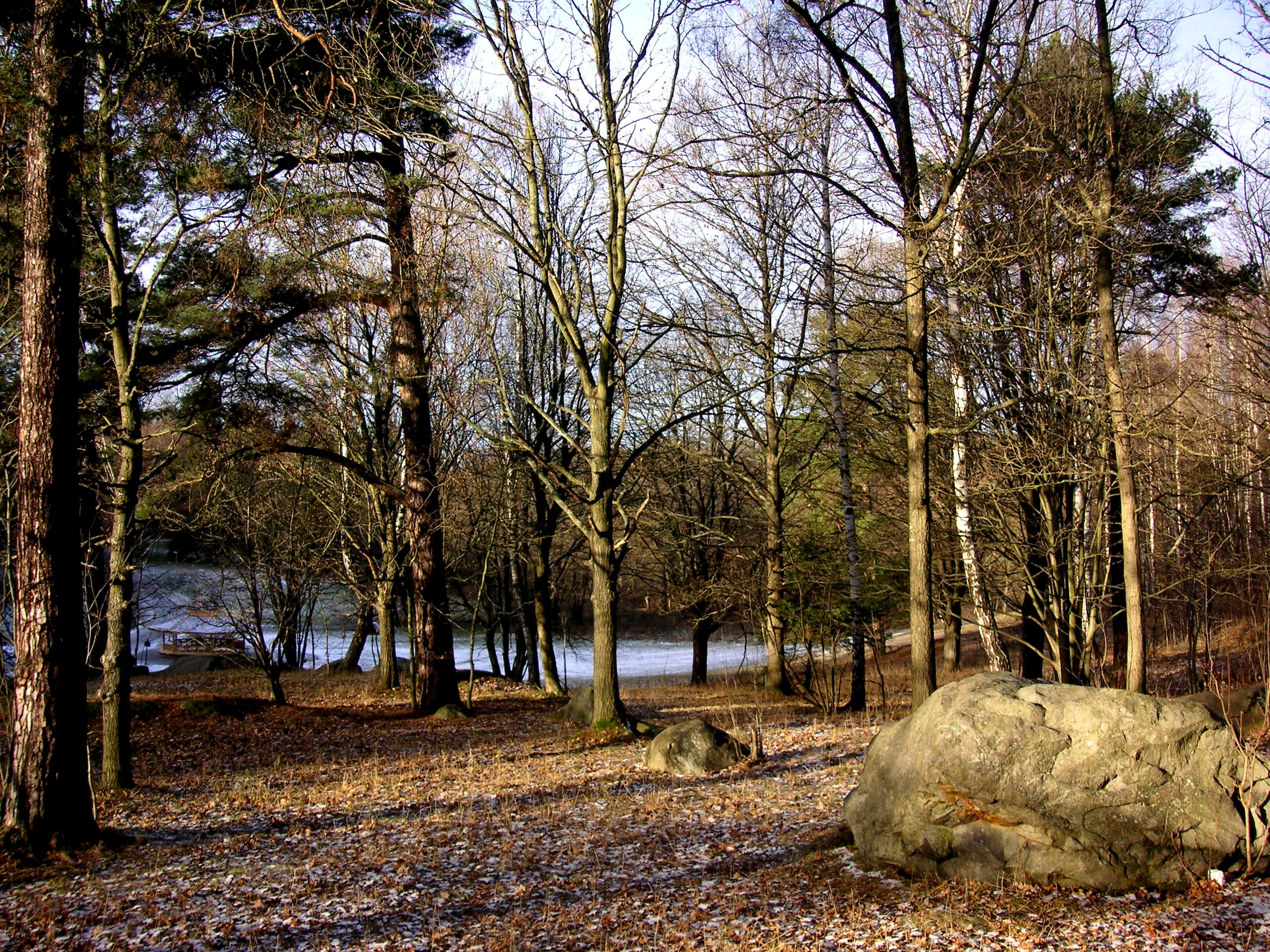
Lill-Jansskogen

Lill-Janskogen, (English: "Little Jan's Forest"), is a park in Stockholm, Sweden.

== Description ==
It is located on northern Djurgården and is a popular area for recreational activities. The Ugglevik spring was a traditional drinking water source in the Lill-Jansskogen forest. The name derives from the nearby bay, Uggleviken. Today only the well pavilion, dating from 1902, remains and the water is undrinkable.

In the middle of Lill-Jansskogen is Ugglevik reservoir (Uggleviksreservoaren). This water reservoir dates from 1935 and was designed by the functionalist architect Paul Hedqvist (1895-1977).

For the 1956 Summer Olympics, the park hosted part of the event portion of the equestrian events.

== Gallery ==
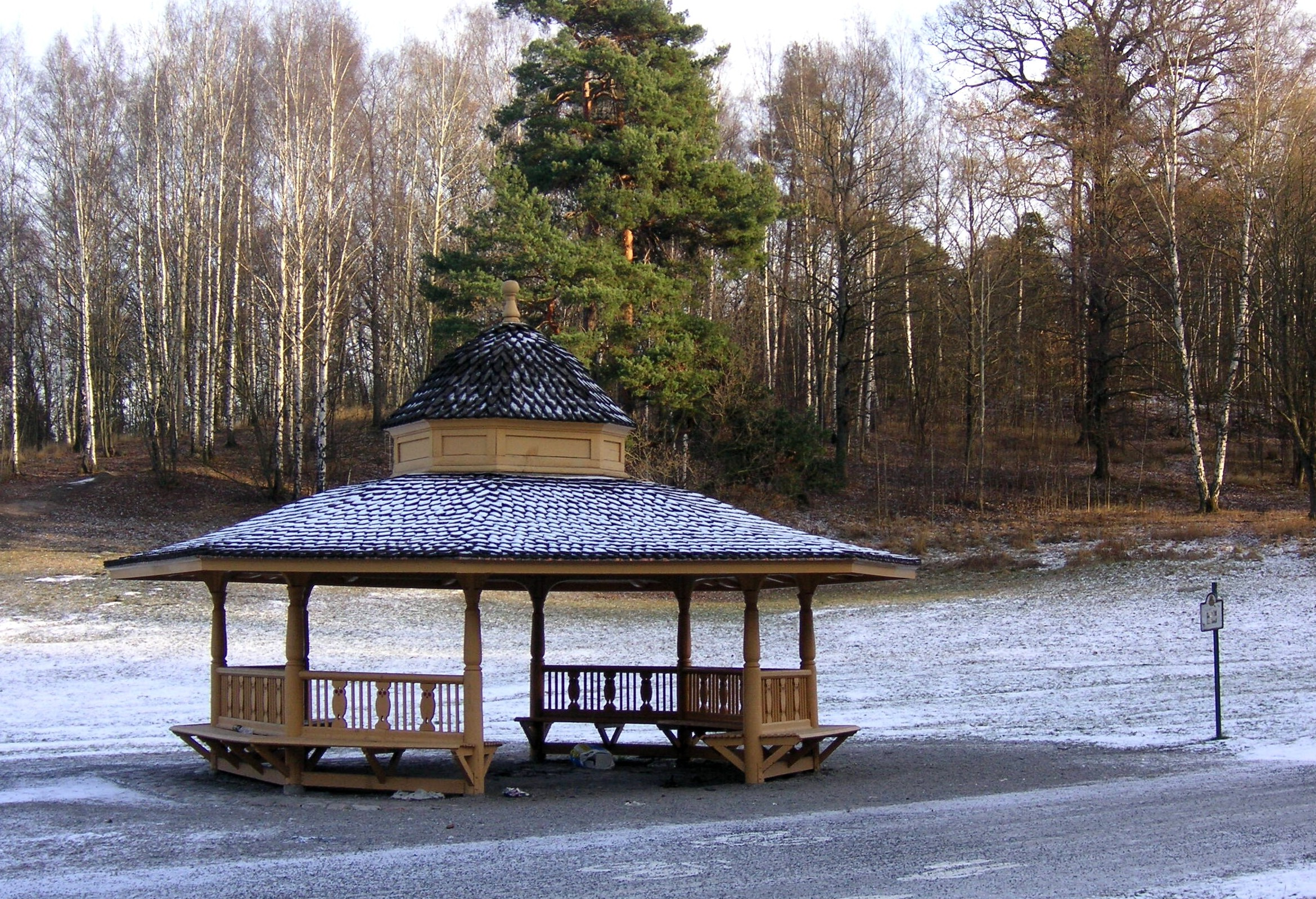
Ugglevik spring pavilion

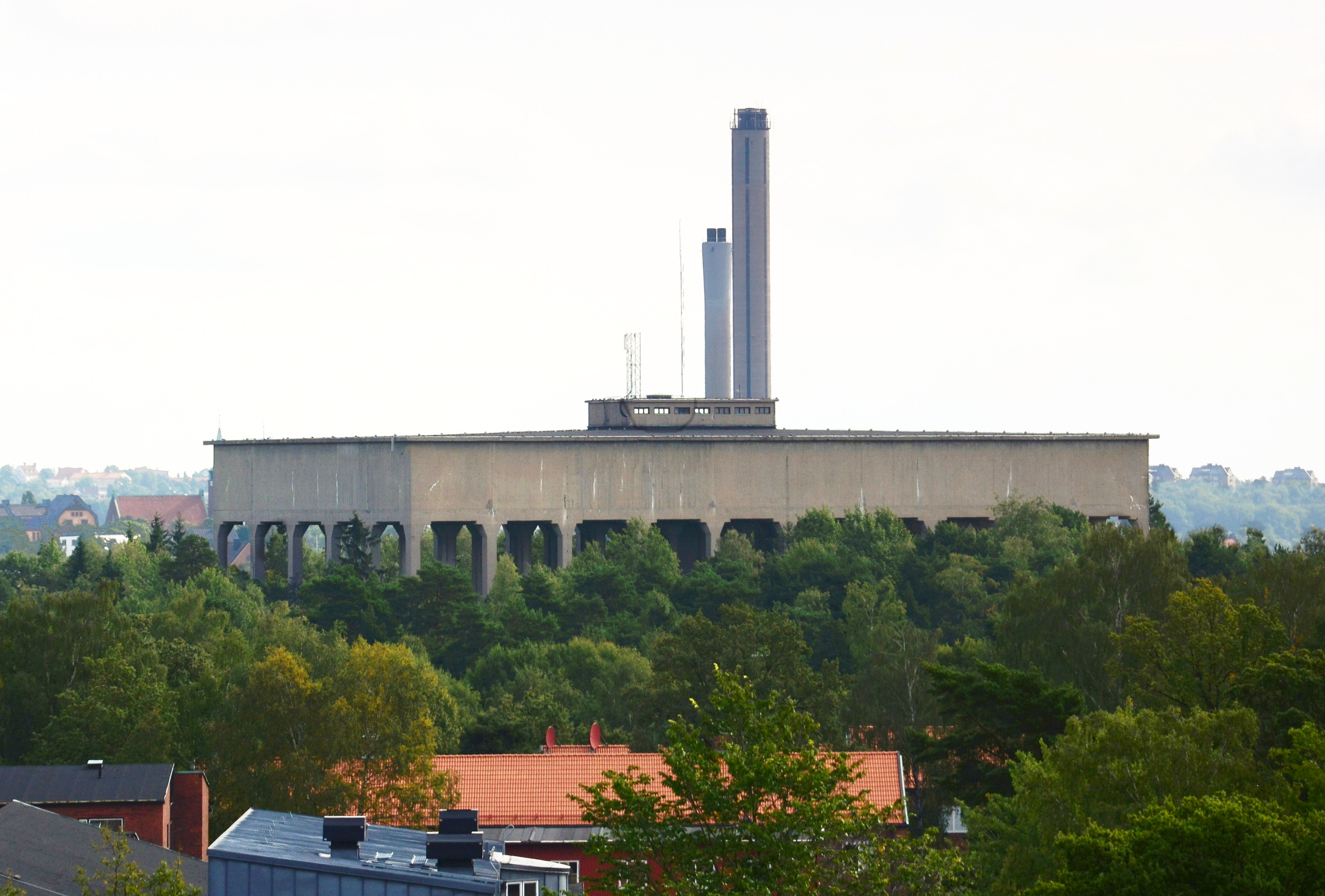
Ugglevik reservoir

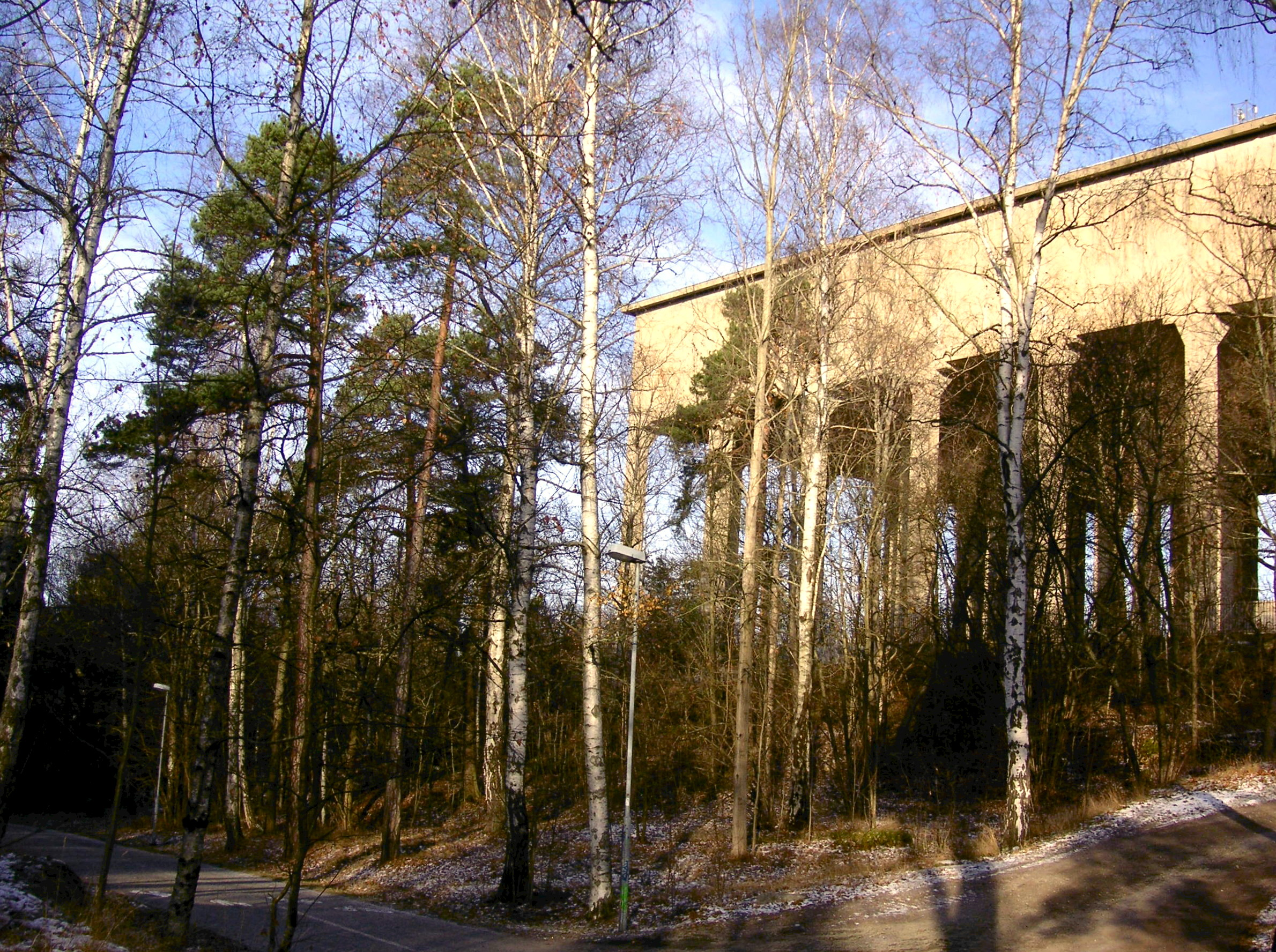
Ugglevik reservoir

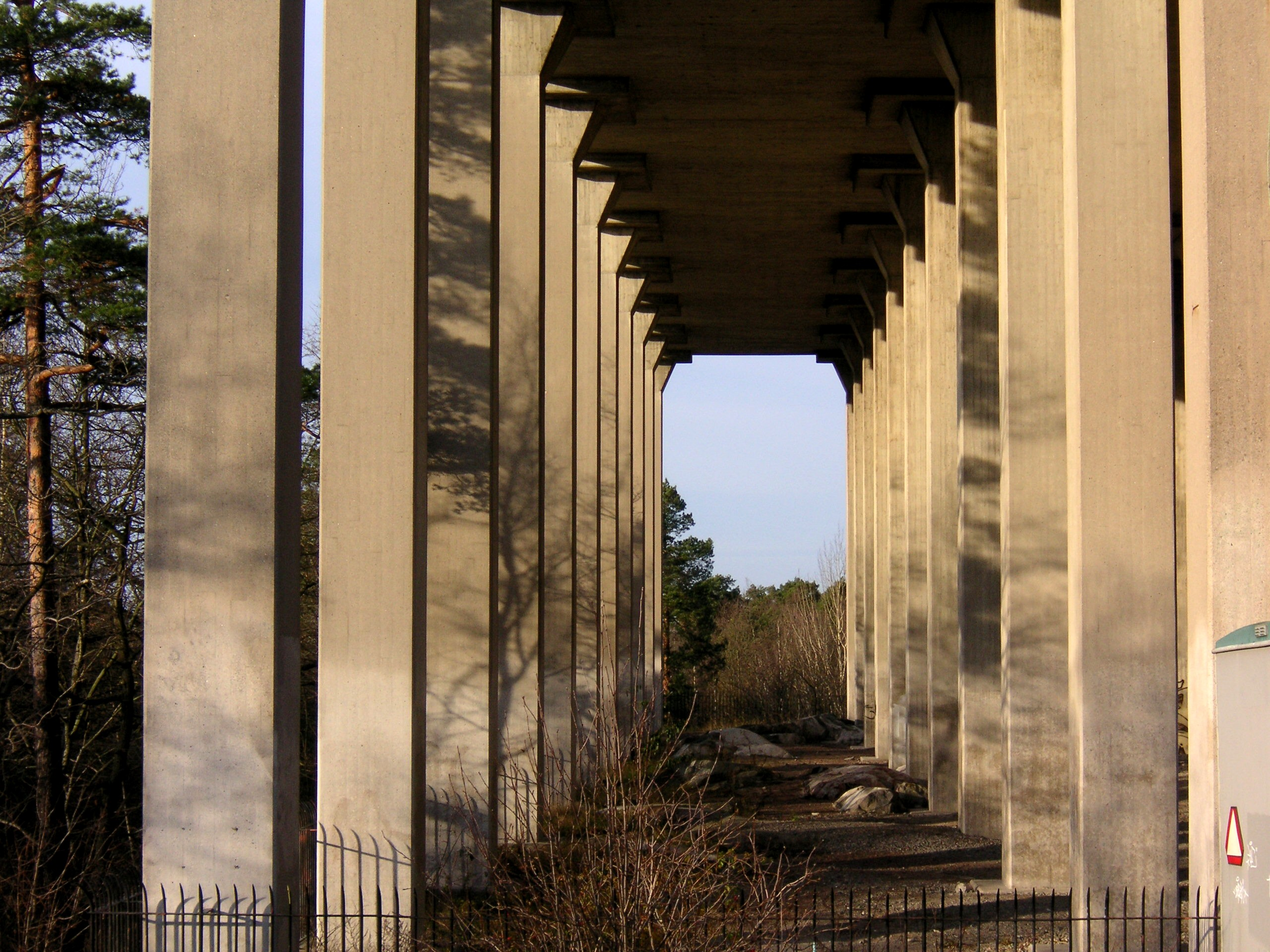
Ugglevik reservoir

== See also ==
- Geography of Stockholm
