= Stockholm Globe City =

Building complex in Stockholm, Sweden

Coordinates: 59°17′37″N 18°4′53″E

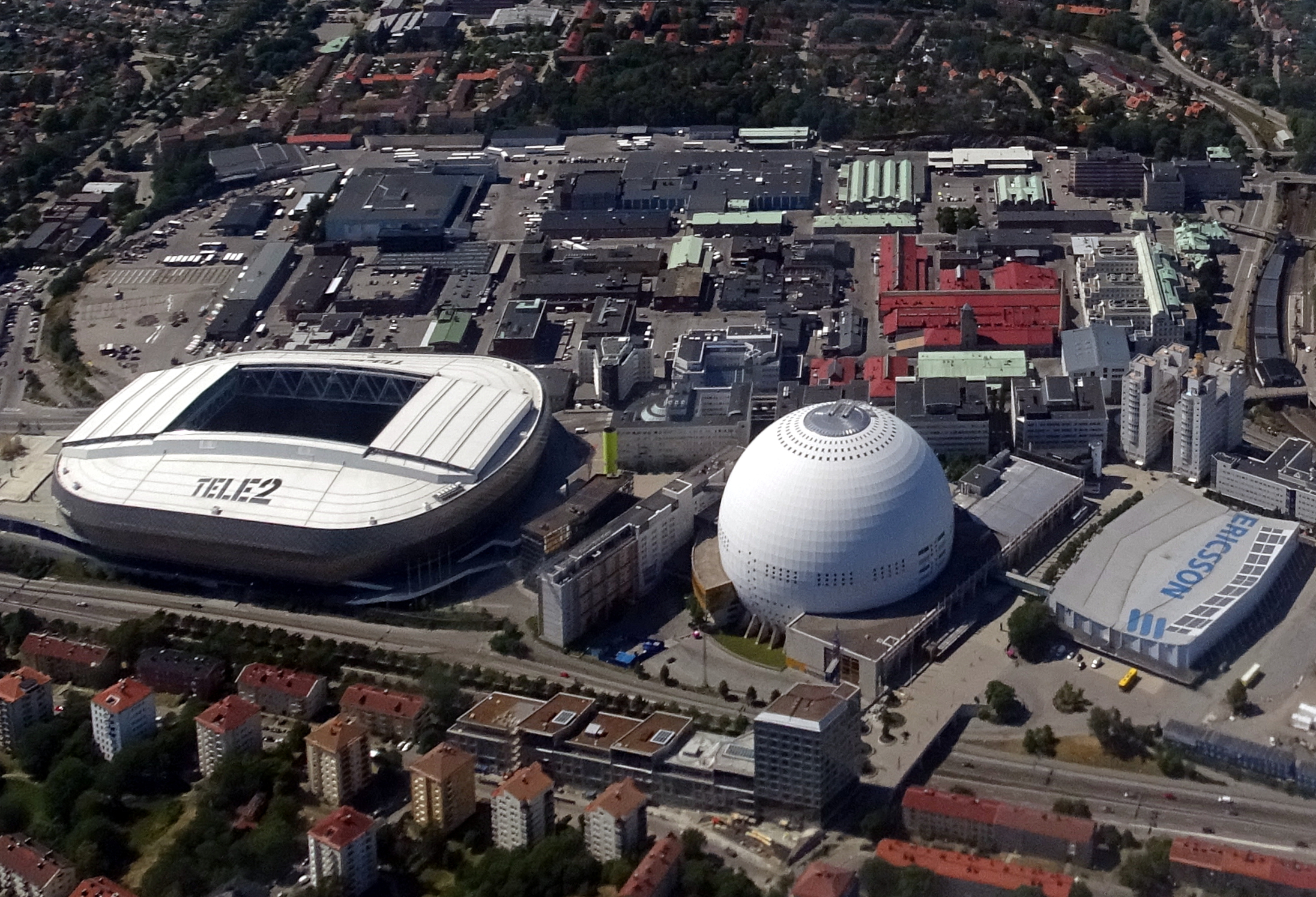
Stockholm Globe City, seen from above.

Stockholm Globe City or Stockholm Globe Arenas is an arena in Johanneshov, in Stockholm, Sweden. It contains a number of venues, office areas, and a shopping centre.

== Venues ==
Venue	Purpose	Capacity	Date built
Hovet	Sport events	9,000	1955
Annexet	Concerts	4,000	1985
Avicii Arena	Concerts and ice hockey	14,119	1989
3Arena	Sports and concerts	30,000	2012

Avicii Arena represents the Sun in the Sweden Solar System.
