= 3Arena (Stockholm) =

Multi-purpose stadium in Stockholm

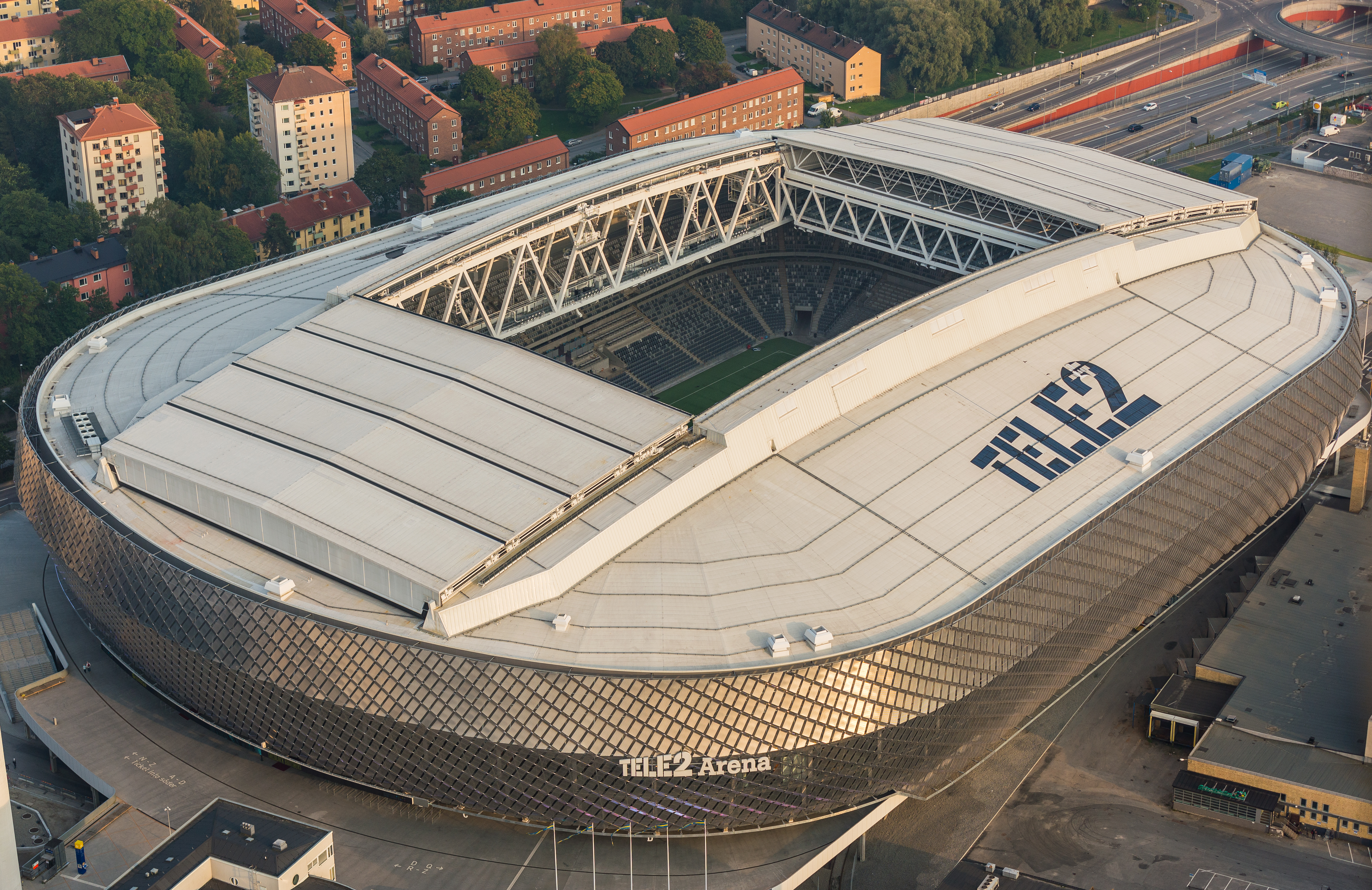
- UEFA Category 4 Stadium
- Interactive map of 3Arena
- Full name: 3Arena
- Former names: Tele2 Arena
- Location: Johanneshov, Stockholm, Sweden
- Coordinates: 59.2908°N 18.0853°E
- Owner: City of Stockholm via SGA Fastigheter
- Operator: AEG Live
- Capacity: 45,000 (concerts); 30,000 (sports); 30,363 (international football); 28,000 (when police is in charge of max capacity, football only)
- Type: multi-purpose Arena
- Surface: Artificial turf
- Record attendance: 39,338 (Madonna, 14 November 2015); 31,810 (HIF–Häcken, 4 November 2018)
- Public transit: Globen; Gullmarsplan

Construction
- Groundbreaking: 10 September 2010
- Built: 2010–2013
- Opened: 20 July 2013
- Cost: SEK 2.7 billion (estimated) €290 million
- Architects: White; Arup; ROSSETTI
- Main contractor: Peab

Tenants
- Djurgårdens IF and Hammarby IF (2013–)

Website
- https://3arena.se/en/

3Arena, formerly known as Stockholmsarenan and Tele2 Arena, is a retractable roof multi-purpose arena in Stockholm Globe City, Johanneshov, just south of Stockholm City Centre, Sweden. It is used mostly for concerts and football matches, hosting home matches of Allsvenskan teams Djurgårdens IF and Hammarby IF. The arena has a capacity of 30,000 to 35,000 spectators for football matches, depending on the number of people standing, and its facilities fulfill the requirements of FIFA and UEFA for hosting international games and tournaments. When configured for concerts, the arena has a capacity of 45,000 spectators.

In European competitions, the stadium is known as Stockholm Arena due to advertising rules.

== History ==
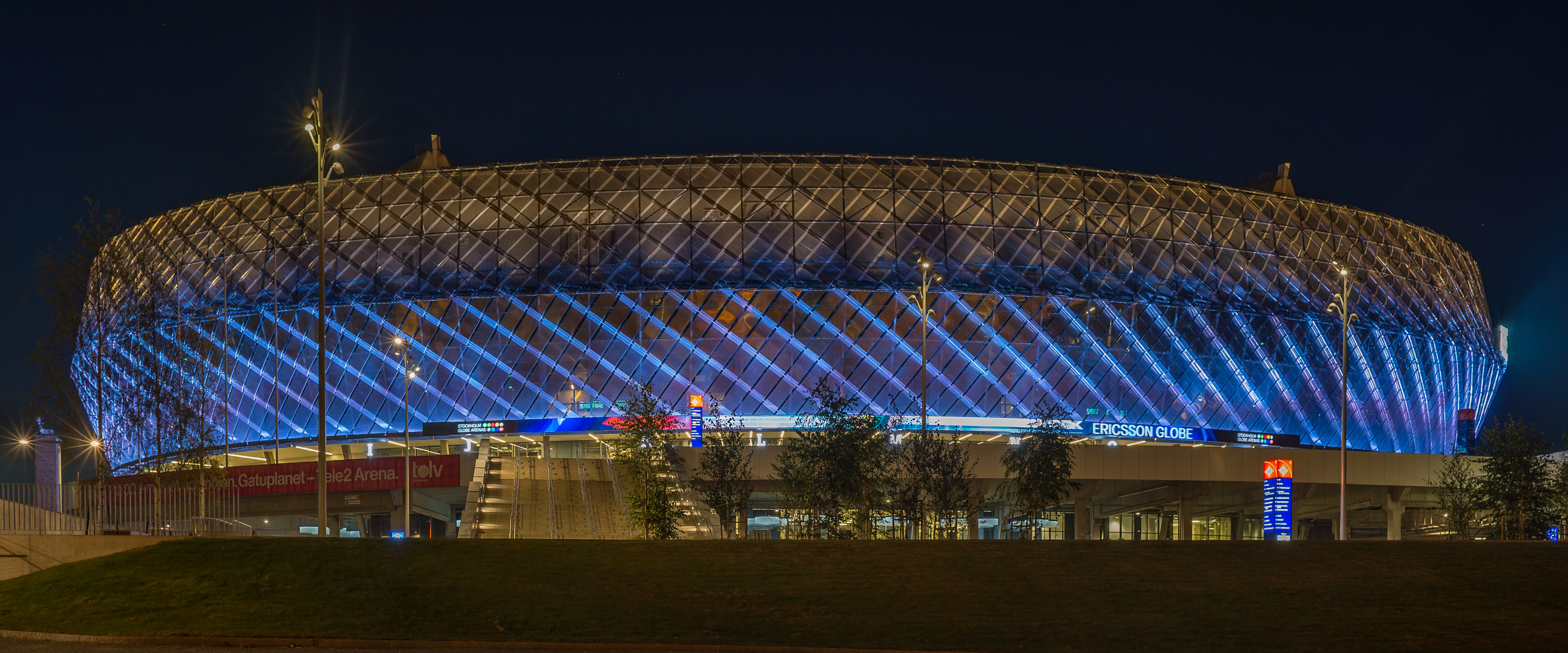
Stockholmsarenan in September 2014.

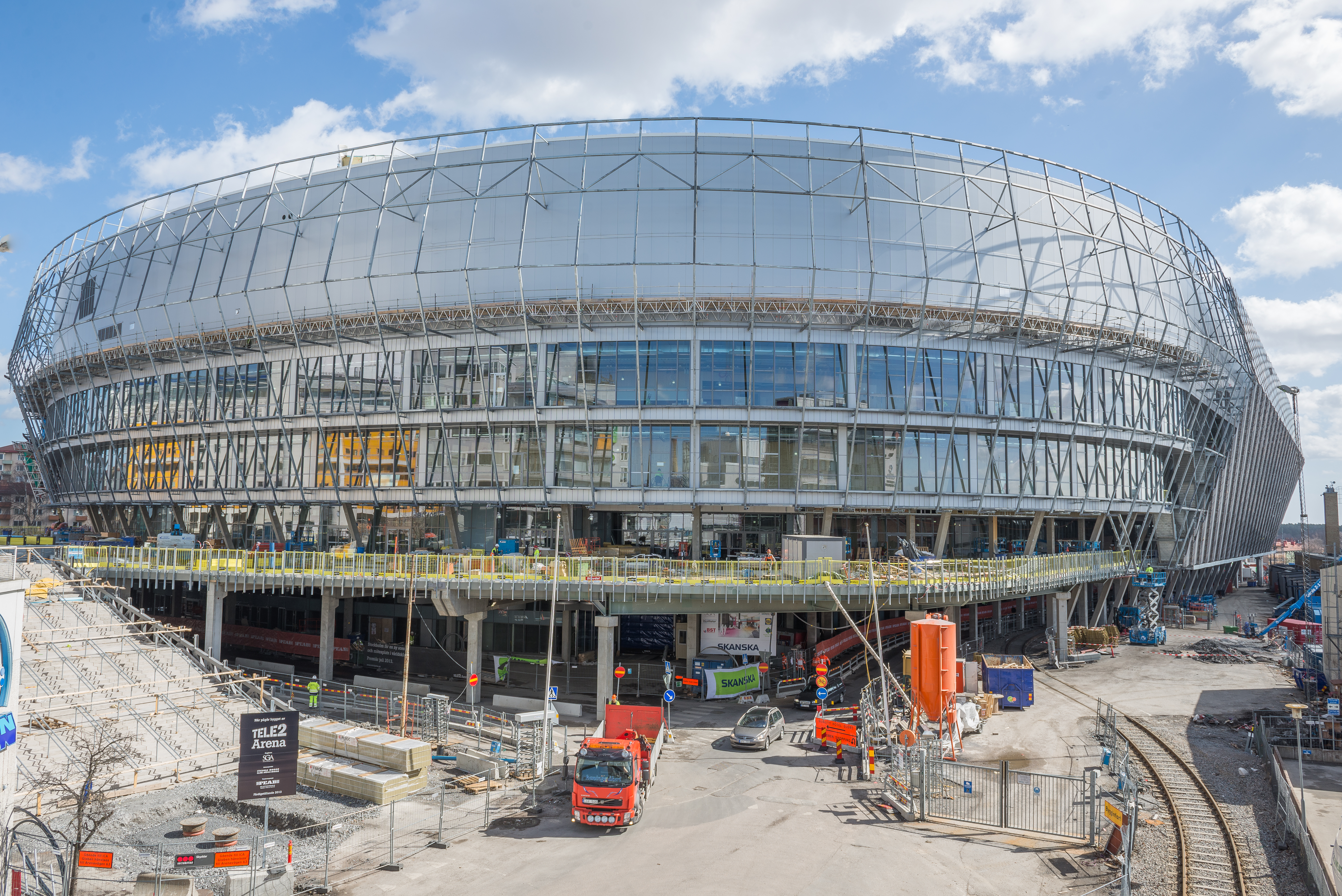
Stockholmsarenan under construction in April 2013.

With a maximum capacity of up to 40,000 and a retractable roof, the arena is able to host concerts, equestrian, motorsport, ice sports, banquettes, exhibitions, company events and shareholder meetings, in addition to football.

The cost was calculated to be 2.7 billion SEK including land appropriation and a new parking garage under the arena. The cost was balanced against income from sales of building rights and rental from the operator who runs the arena. Financing was mostly covered by sale of land, mainly the lot where Söderstadion was situated and associated building rights for commercial premises. The owner is the City of Stockholm via subsidiary SGA Fastigheter AB.

The arena was planned to host the opening game of the ice hockey World Championship 2013, but the construction was delayed and the arena was not finished until July 2013, two months after the tournament. Initially, it was intended that the stadium would stage the finals of the Swedish Super League, but after the delay, it was decided that the finals in 2013 and 2014 would be moved to Malmö Arena. It is decided that Stockholmsarenan will be the national stadium of Swedish speedway and American football.

It is also possible to have artificially-frozen ice on the ground. The bandy team of Hammarby IF has practiced on the ice when this possibility was tried for the first time, but the team will so far still use Zinkensdamms IP as their home ground for bandy. "Bandyns dag" ("Bandy Day") was supposed to be arranged at the arena on 14 December 2013 with a match against IFK Vänersborg as the climax but had to be cancelled due to problems with preparing the ice. Instead, the match against Sandvikens AIK on 10 January 2014 was played at Stockholmsarenan.

On 27 June 2013, just days before Hammarby's first football match at their new arena, an explosive device was found outside the stadium. Former players from rivals Djurgården were to play a friendly that evening in front of approximately 3,000 spectators, but the game was cancelled due to the threat. The culture commissioner for the City of Stockholm has stated that the city council "has authority over who gets to play there, and that power will be used" if the situation does not get under control.

The first official event at the stadium was a football match between Hammarby and Örgryte IS on 20 July 2013. The match, which ended in a 0–0 draw, brought in 29,175 spectators, setting a new record for highest attendance at a Superettan match. The following day, a crowd of 27,798 attended Djurgårdens IF's inaugural match at Stockholmsarenan, a 1–2 defeat by IFK Norrköping.

On 1 January 2025, the arena was renamed the 3Arena, as a result of telecommunations company 3 taking over as title sponsor from Tele2.

== Events ==
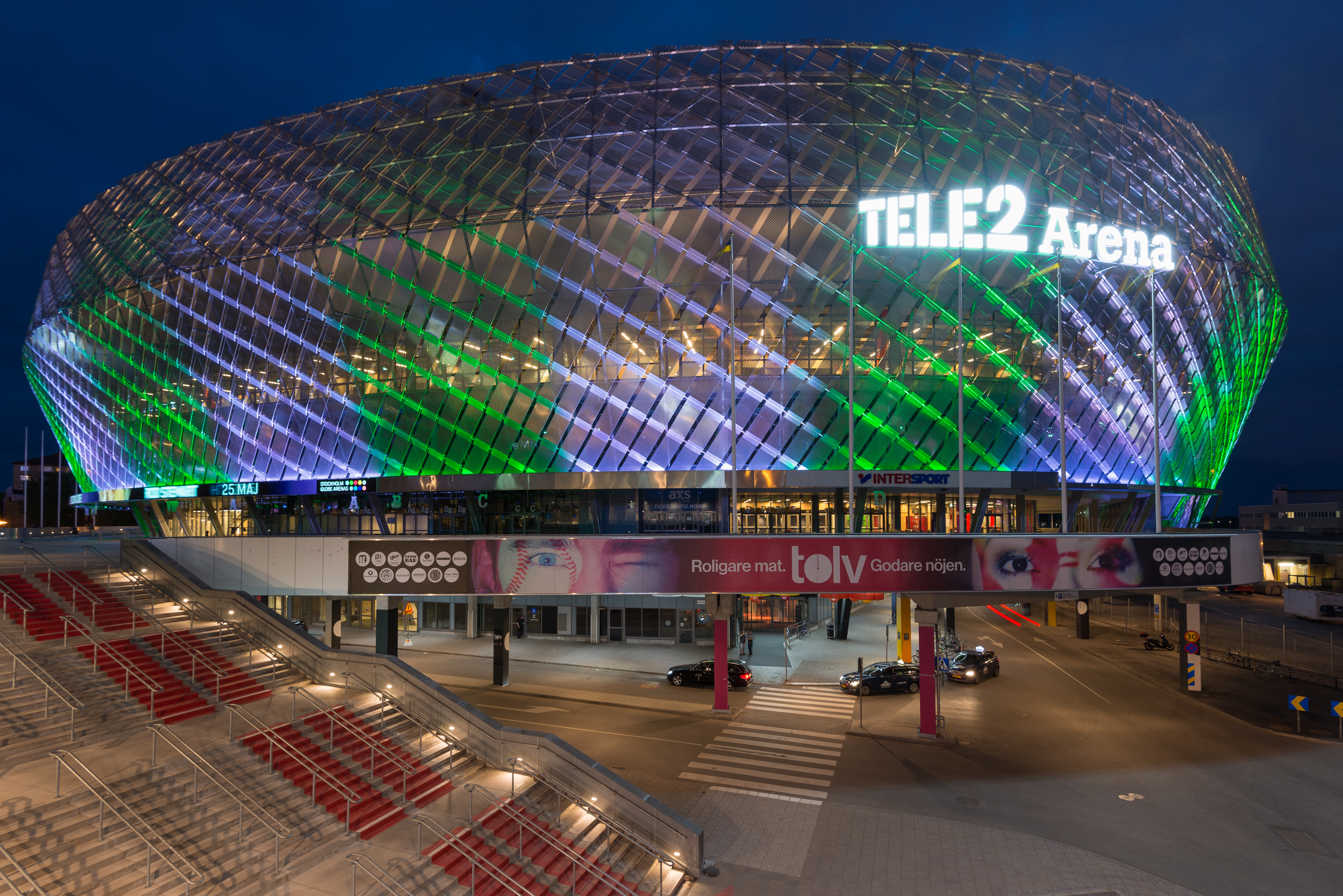
Stockholmsarenan lit up in green and white during a Hammarby match.

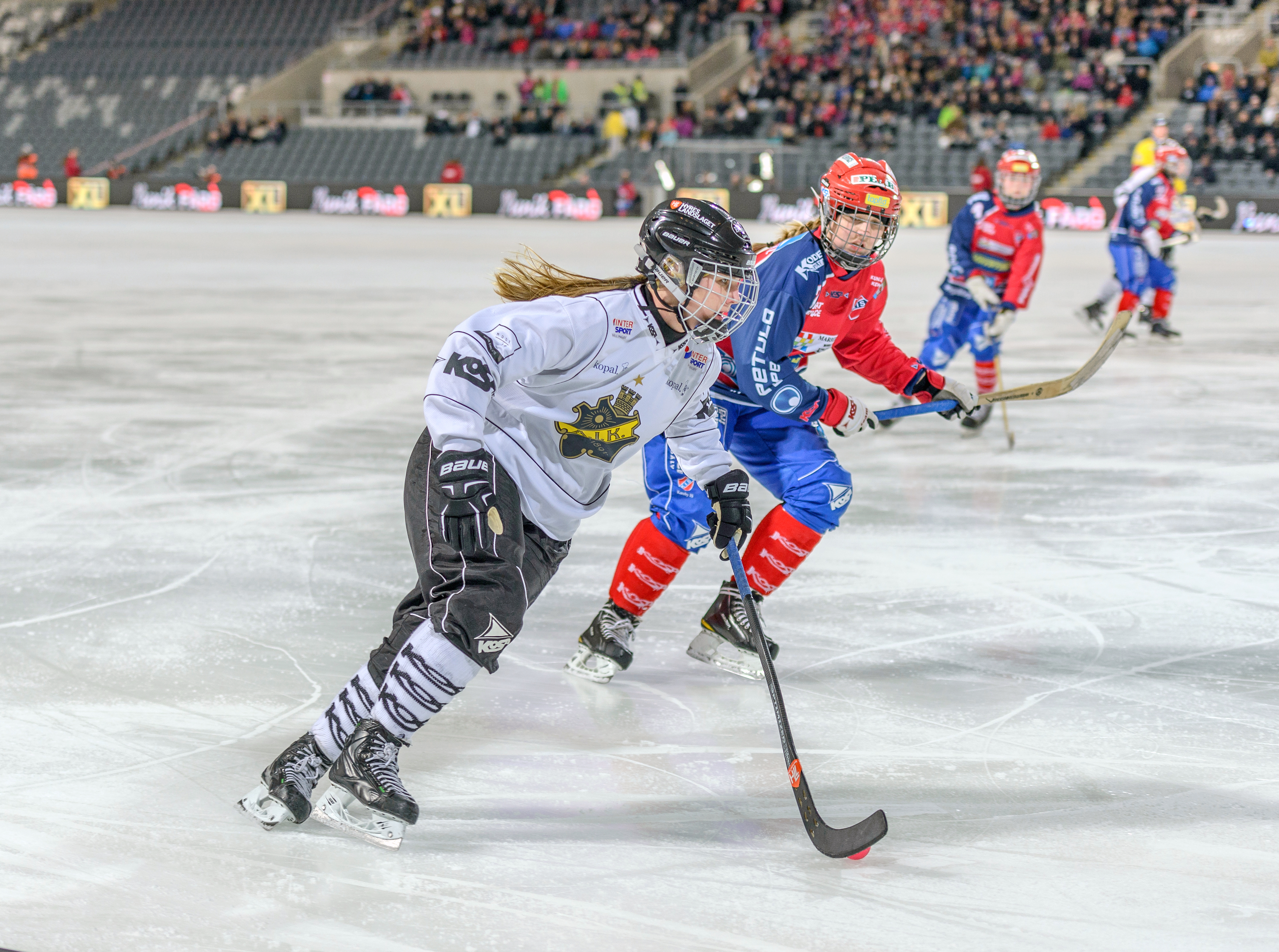
The national women's bandy final in 2015

Two football teams from Stockholm, Hammarby IF and Djurgårdens IF, have played their home games at Stockholmsarenan since July 2013. Another Stockholm club, IF Brommapojkarna, have occasionally played matches against the other Stockholm teams at Stockholmsarenan instead of at their usual home ground, Grimsta IP.

The official inauguration took place on 24 August 2013, featuring Swedish artists Robyn, Lars Winnerbäck and Kent, but the first concert at Stockholmsarenan had already taken place on 27 July 2013, with Swedish band Gyllene Tider performing.

On 28 February and 1 March 2014, Swedish superstar Avicii made two sold-out concerts with 35,000 and 40,000 spectators respectively.

The Rolling Stones played at Stockholmsarenan on 1 July 2014 as part of the European leg of their 14 On Fire tour. It was the band's 26th-ever appearance in Sweden.

Paul McCartney played at Stockholmsarenan on 9 July 2015 as part of the European leg of his Out There Tour.

Madonna visited the stadium with her Rebel Heart Tour on 14 November 2015, attracting over 39,000 people. The singer would return to the stadium with her Celebration Tour on 28 October 2023.

In 2015, the American football World Championship was to be hosted in Stockholm, with Stockholmsarenan as the only venue.

On 24 January 2015, the Arena hosted UFC on Fox: Gustafsson vs. Johnson, a mixed martial arts match between Swedish fighter Alexander Gustafsson and American Anthony Johnson. In 2015 and 2016, the Swedish Bandy Finals have been held at the arena. In addition, Hammarby IF have played single matches here.

Adele performed at the arena as a part of her Adele Live 2016 Tour on 29 April 2016.

Rihanna performed at the arena as a part of her Anti World Tour on 4 July 2016.

Justin Bieber performed at the arena as a part of his Purpose World Tour on 29 and 30 September 2016.

On 17 June 2017, for her Celine Dion Live 2017 tour, Celine Dion performed in front of a crowd of a less than average 21,699, selling out almost instantly. Her production opted to divide the stadium in half for her show, citing "Better experience for the audience and for logistical reasons".

Axwell, Sebastian Ingrosso and Steve Angello performed three reunion shows as the Swedish House Mafia at Stockholmsarenan from 2 to 4 May 2019, after they split up in March 2013 ending their One Last Tour at the Ultra Music Festival. Tickets for these shows sold out fast; more than 120,000 tickets were sold within 5 minutes.

It hosted several matches of the 2023 World Men's Handball Championship, which Sweden was co-hosting alongside Poland.

Laleh will be the first Swedish female artist to headline a concert at the arena, as part of her national summer tour dates in 2023.

== List of concerts ==
Date	Artist(s)	Tour	Attendance
27 July 2013	(Sweden) Gyllene Tider	2013 Summer Tour	23,082
24 August 2013	(Sweden) Kent, Lars Winnerbäck, Robyn	Inauguration concerts	39,714
26 November 2013	(Denmark) Volbeat	Outlaw Gentlemen & Shady Ladies Live	9,152
28 February 2014	(Sweden) Avicii	True Tour	69,725
1 March 2014	(Sweden) Avicii	True Tour	69,725
10 May 2014	(United States) Justin Timberlake	The 20/20 Experience World Tour	26,602
1 June 2014	(United States) Aerosmith	Global Warming Tour	
1 July 2014	(United Kingdom) The Rolling Stones	14 On Fire	37,009
9 July 2015	(United Kingdom) Paul McCartney	Out There	23,579
14 November 2015	(United States) Madonna	Rebel Heart Tour	39,338
29 April 2016	(United Kingdom) Adele	Adele Live 2016	31,069
4 July 2016	(Barbados) Rihanna	Anti World Tour	34,956
10 September 2016	(United States) Red Hot Chili Peppers	The Getaway World Tour	25,820
29 September 2016	(Canada) Justin Bieber	Purpose World Tour	79,380
30 September 2016	(Canada) Justin Bieber	Purpose World Tour	79,380
15 December 2016	(Sweden) Kent	Avskedsturnén	113,400
16 December 2016	(Sweden) Kent	Avskedsturnén	113,400
17 December 2016	(Sweden) Kent	Avskedsturnén	113,400
6 May 2017	(United States) Kiss	The KISSWORLD 2017 Tour	24 334
17 June 2017	(Canada) Celine Dion	Celine Dion Live 2017	21,699
29 July 2017	(United Kingdom) Robbie Williams	The Heavy Entertainment Show Tour	
1 June 2018	(United Kingdom) Iron Maiden	Legacy of the Beast World Tour	37,221
2 May 2019	(Sweden) Swedish House Mafia	Save The World Reunion Tour 2019	114,629
3 May 2019	(Sweden) Swedish House Mafia	Save The World Reunion Tour 2019	114,629
4 May 2019	(Sweden) Swedish House Mafia	Save The World Reunion Tour 2019	114,629
5 June 2019	(United States) Bon Jovi	This House Is Not for Sale Tour	35, 419
8 June 2019	(United States) Eagles	2019 World Tour	
3 August 2019	(United States) Pink	Beautiful Trauma Tour	33,943
29 June 2022	(United Kingdom) Harry Styles	Love On Tour	36,282
17 June 2023	(Canada) The Weeknd	After Hours til Dawn Tour	70,130
18 June 2023	(Canada) The Weeknd	After Hours til Dawn Tour	70,130
7 July 2023	(United Kingdom) Elton John	Farewell Yellow Brick Road	72,300
8 July 2023	(United Kingdom) Elton John	Farewell Yellow Brick Road	72,300
19 August 2023	(Sweden) Laleh	Sommarturné 2023	20,137
28 October 2023	(United States) Madonna	The Celebration Tour	
8 March 2024	(United Kingdom) The 1975	Still... At Their Very Best	
12 June 2024	(Trinidad and Tobago) Nicki Minaj	Pink Friday 2 World Tour	
2 September 2024	(United States) Justin Timberlake	The Forget Tomorrow World Tour	
21 March 2025	(Sweden) Kent	Reunion concerts	239,953
22 March 2025	(Sweden) Kent	Reunion concerts	239,953
23 March 2025	(Sweden) Kent	Reunion concerts	239,953
25 March 2025	(Sweden) Kent	Reunion concerts	239,953
26 March 2025	(Sweden) Kent	Reunion concerts	239,953
27 March 2025	(Sweden) Kent	Reunion concerts	239,953
9 August 2025	(United States) Kendrick Lamar, SZA	Grand National Tour	32,841
29 May 2026	(United States) Linkin Park	From Zero World Tour	

=== Highest attendances ===
Attendance	Performance	Event	Date	Ref.
40,000	Iron Maiden	Concert	1 June 2018	
40,000	Avicii	Concert	1 March 2014	
39,714	Kent, Lars Winnerbäck, Robyn, Zhala	Concert	26 August 2013	
39,338	Madonna	Concert	14 November 2015	
38,209	Swedish House Mafia	Concert	2 May 2019	
37,009	Rolling Stones	Concert	2 July 2014	
35,000	Avicii	Concert	28 February 2014	
31,756	Hammarby IF vs Östersunds FK	2016 Allsvenskan	4 April 2016	

== Interior and tifos ==
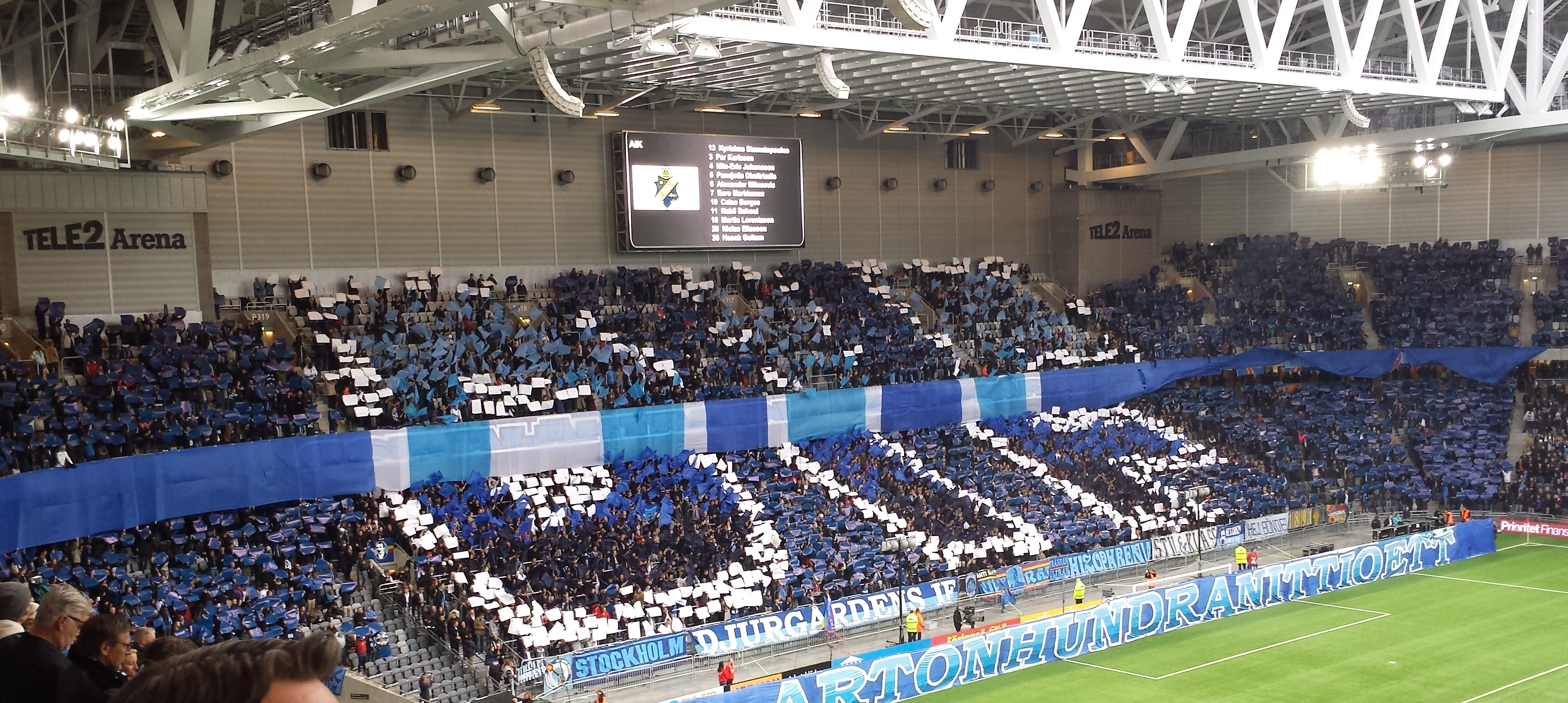
Djurgårdens IF supporters in a Stockholm-derby against AIK.
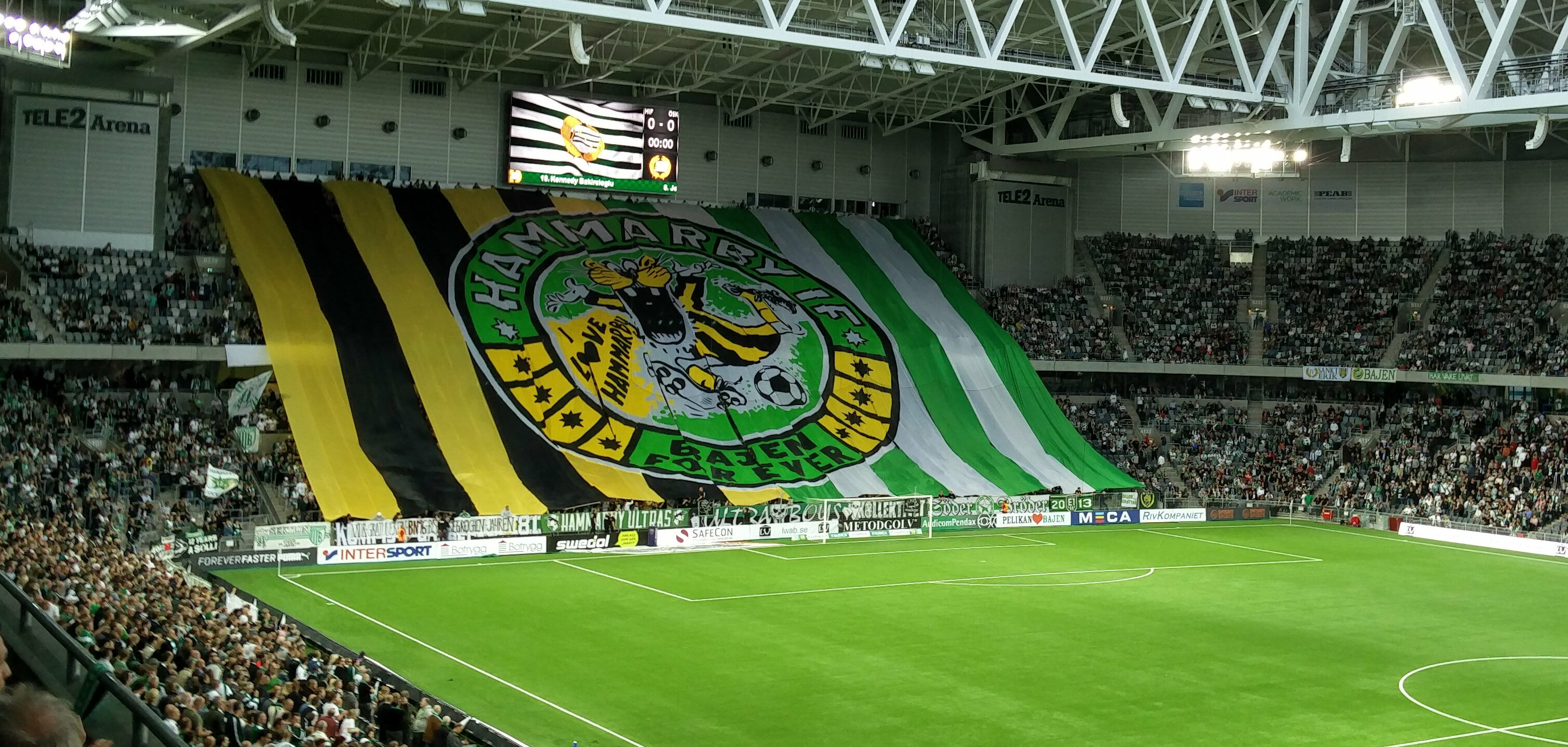
Hammarby IF tifo in an Allsvenskan game.

== Average attendances ==
Season	Djurgårdens IF			Hammarby IF			Ref
Season	Division	GP	Season Average	Division	GP	Season Average	Ref
2013	Allsvenskan	8	15,858	Superettan	8	14,145	
2014	Allsvenskan	15	13,145	Superettan	15	20,451	
2015	Allsvenskan	15	15,482	Allsvenskan	15	25,507	
2016	Allsvenskan	15	13,393	Allsvenskan	15	22,885	
2017	Allsvenskan	15	16,241	Allsvenskan	15	22,137	
2018	Allsvenskan	15	12,307	Allsvenskan	15	23,680	
2019	Allsvenskan	15	15,958	Allsvenskan	15	24,232	
2020	Season played behind closed doors due to COVID-19.			Season played behind closed doors due to COVID-19.			
2021	Allsvenskan	11*	9,198	Allsvenskan	11*	10,263	
2022	Allsvenskan	15	19,587	Allsvenskan	15	26,372	
2023	Allsvenskan	15	19,331	Allsvenskan	15	22,543	
2024	Allsvenskan	15	19,339	Allsvenskan	15	23,578	
2025	Allsvenskan	15	19,400	Allsvenskan	15	24,297	

- Four fixtures each played behind closed doors during 2021 season.

== See also ==
- Annexet
- Avicii Arena (The Globe)
- Strawberry Arena
- Stockholm Globe City
- List of football stadiums in Sweden
- Lists of stadiums

Preceded by Arena Zagreb; Zagreb	European Men's Handball Championship; Final Venue; 2020	Succeeded by New Budapest Arena; Budapest
Preceded by Cairo Stadium Indoor Hall; Cairo	World Men's Handball Championship; Final Venue; 2023	Succeeded by Telenor Arena; Oslo
