= Kingsize Magazine =

Swedish hip-hop magazine

- Editor-in-chief: Malkolm Landréus
- Former editors: Tobias Carlsson
- Categories: Music, culture
- Frequency: Bi-monthly
- Format: Magazine
- Circulation: 15,000
- Founder: Hallgeir Knutsen, Julian Alexander Kibsgård
- Founded: 2004
- First issue: 2004; 22 years ago
- Company: HKM Media Group
- Country: Sweden
- Based in: Stockholm
- Language: Swedish
- Website: www.kingsizemag.se
- ISSN: 1652-8190
- OCLC: 937176681

Kingsize
- Categories: Music, culture
- Frequency: Bi-monthly (former quarterly)
- Circulation: 5,000
- Founder: Hallgeir Knutsen, Julian Alexander Kibsgård
- Founded: 2001
- First issue: March 2001; 24 years ago
- Final issue: August 2009; 16 years ago
- Country: Norway
- Based in: Oslo
- Language: Norwegian
- Website: www.kingsize.no
- ISSN: 1502-7783
- OCLC: 286456462

Kingsize Magazine (sometimes written as KingSize) is a Scandinavian magazine focusing on hip-hop music and culture. It was founded in Norway in 2001 by Hallgeir Knutsen and Julian Alexander Kibsgård and was the first Norwegian-language hip-hop magazine. Kingsize expanded to Sweden in 2004, with separate Norwegian and Swedish issues published bi-monthly. The Norwegian edition originally had a circulation of 5,000 copies and was published quarterly, with a target audience of boys aged 15–25. The Norwegian Kingsize ceased publication in 2009 due to declining advertising revenue.

The Swedish edition of Kingsize has been issued since 2004 but ceased physical publications in 2012 to focus on their website and online magazine. The magazine returned in its physical edition in 2018 after being purchased by Nöjesguiden Media, the company behind Nöjesguiden. As of 2018, Kingsize Magazine is distributed free-of-charge mainly in Stockholm, Gothenburg and Malmö, and is funded by advertisers. In August 2025, Kingsize announced it had once again ceased physical publications, with the last magazine issued in May of that year. In the 2010s, the magazine hosted the Kingsizegalan, an annual music awards ceremony celebrating Swedish hip-hop. Kingsize Magazine is the largest hip-hop magazine in the Nordic region.
