= Johanneshov =

District in southern Stockholm, Sweden

- District of Enskede-Årsta-Vantör
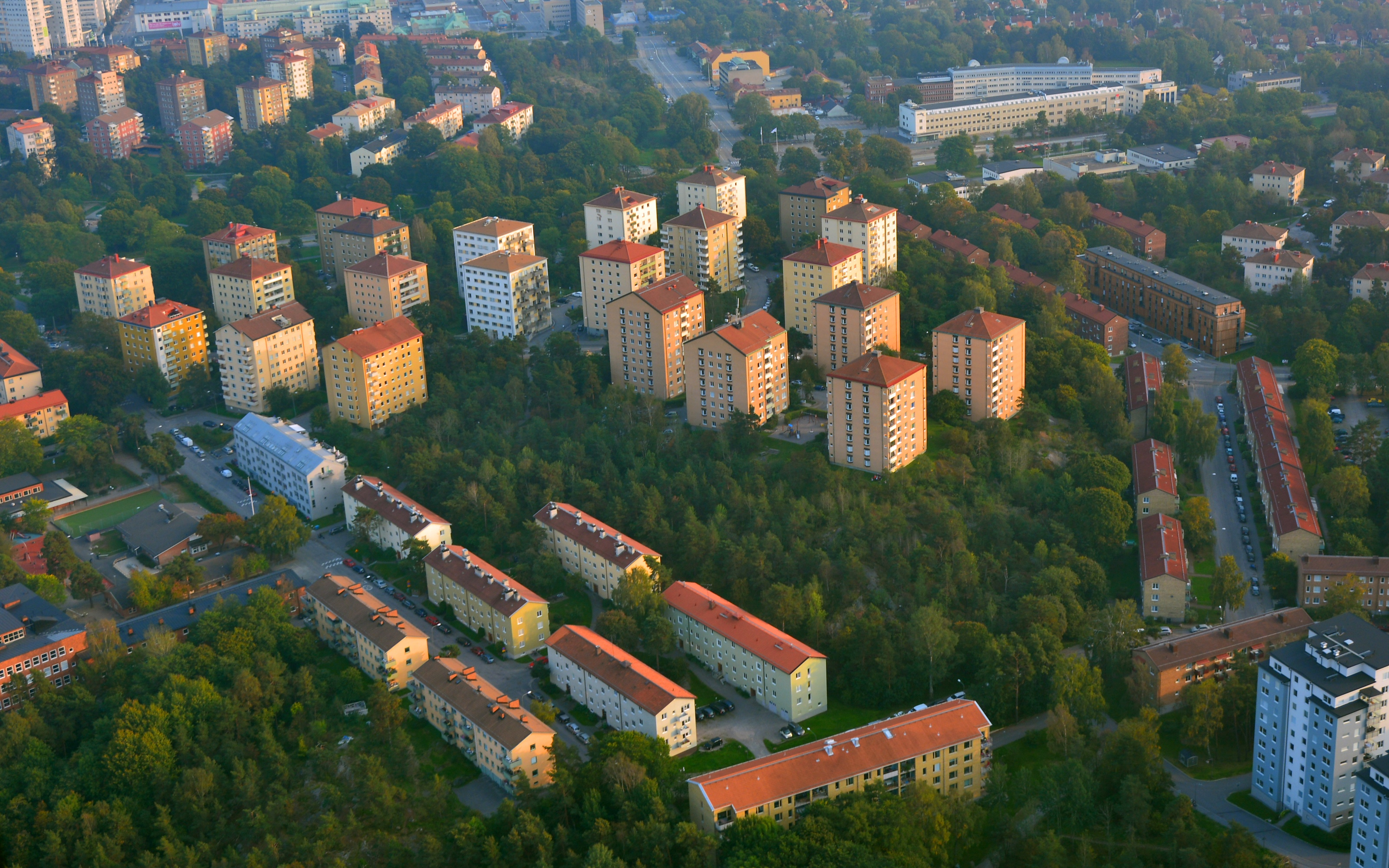

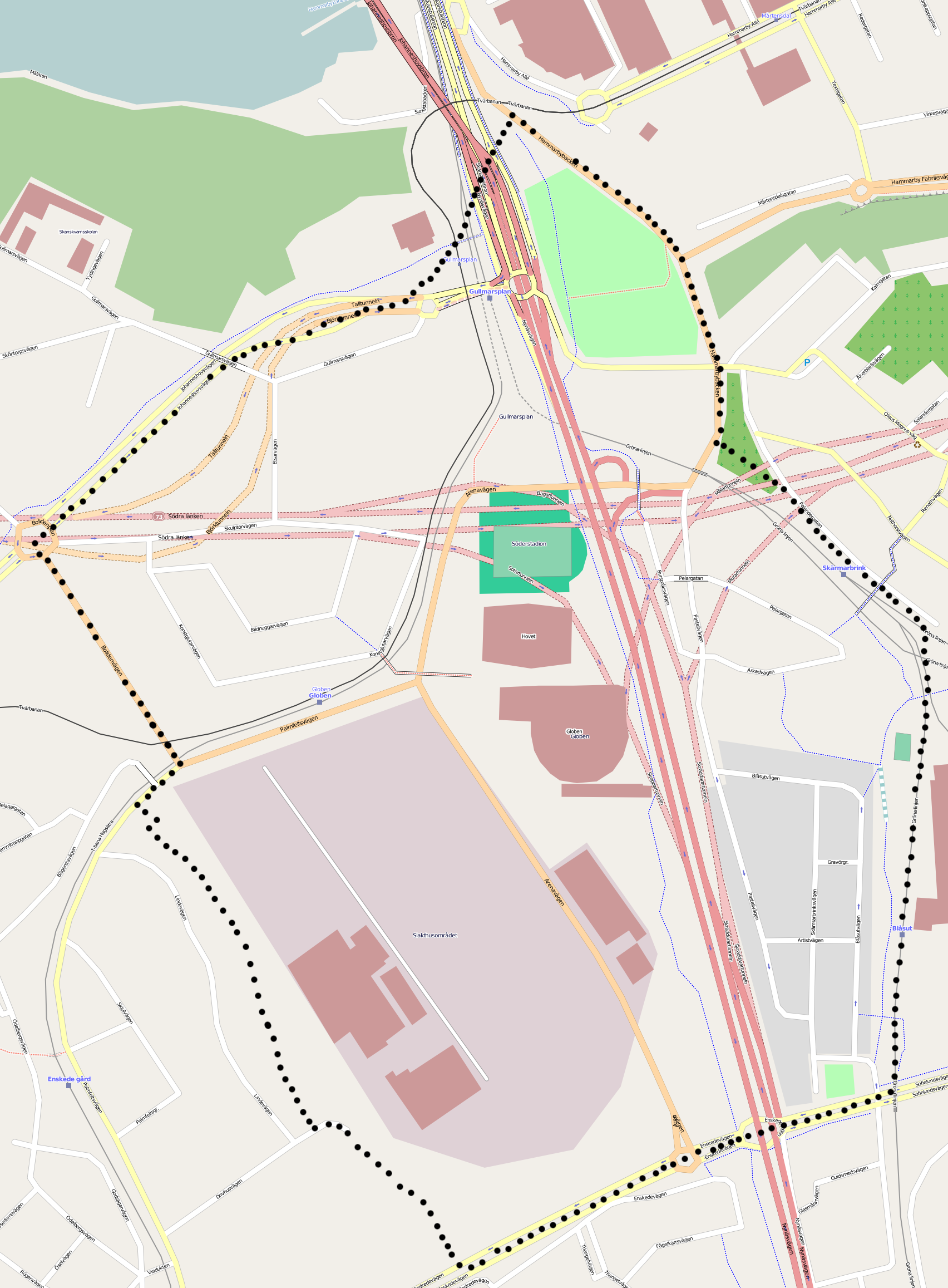
- Coordinates: 59°17′40″N 18°5′0″E
- Country: Sweden
- County: Stockholm County
- Municipality: Stockholm Municipality
- Borough: Enskede-Årsta-Vantör
- Established: 1932

Population (2023)
  - Total: 6,353
- Area code: 121

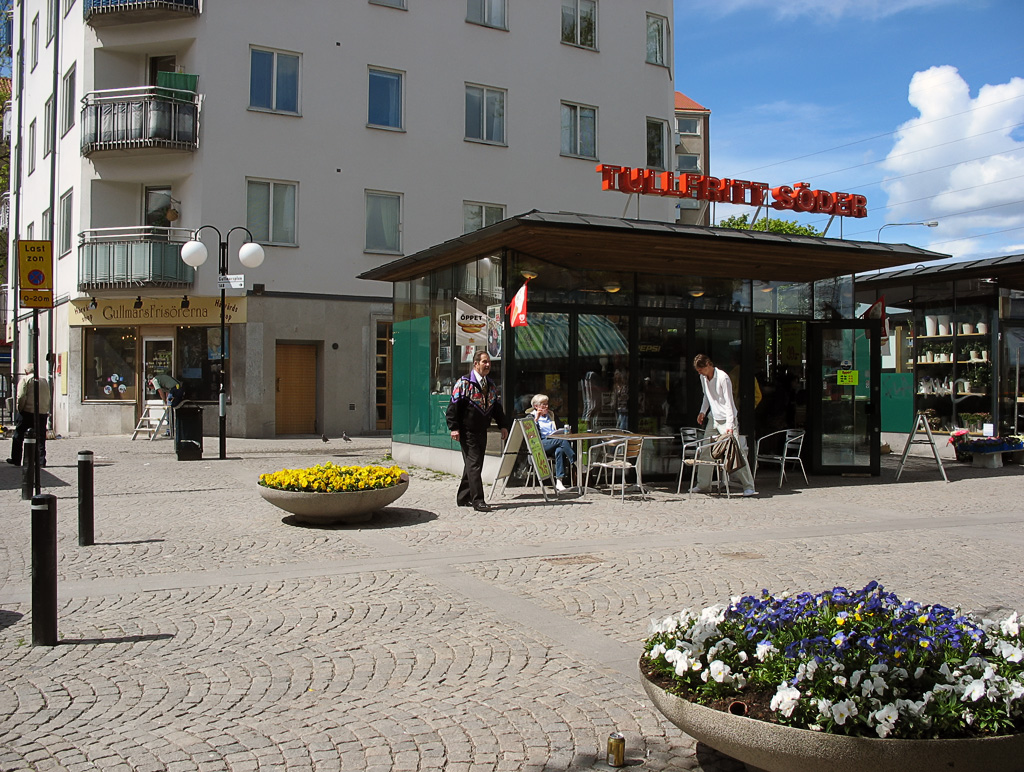
Gullmarsplan in Johanneshov

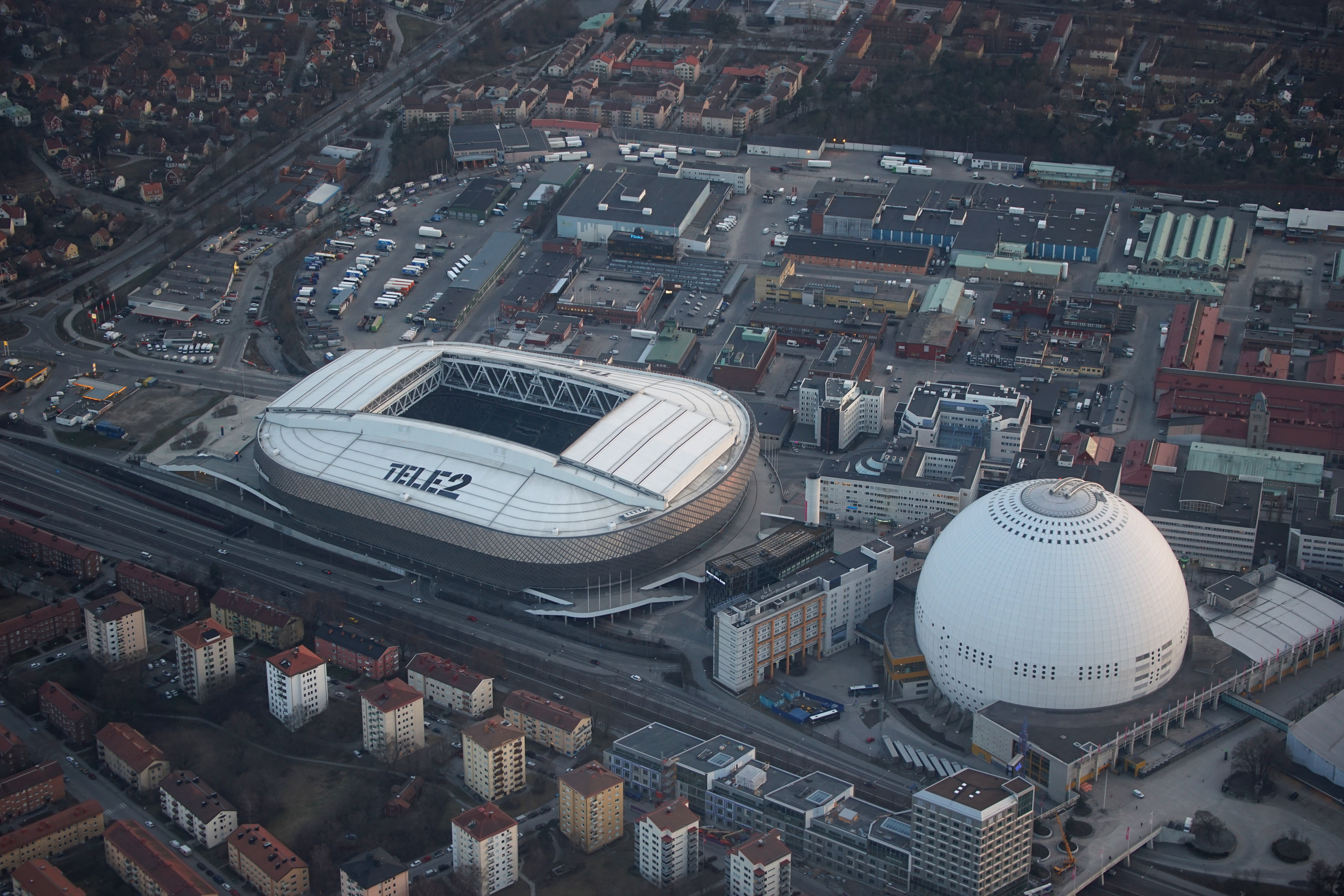
Aerial view, April 2018.

Johanneshov is a district in Stockholm located at the intersection of national road 73 and national road 75 in the borough of Enskede-Årsta-Vantör, southern Stockholm, Sweden.

The icehockey arena Hovet is located in Johanneshov, its current formal name taken from its former popular name, and short for "Johanneshovs isstadion".

Slakthusområdet, a former meat-packing district, is being developed into an urban city area with small businesses and apartments. The project also includes the adjacent areas of Gullmarsplan and Globen under the name Vision Söderstaden 2030.

Other major landmarks of the district are the Avicii Arena (formerly named Stockholm Globe Arena and Ericsson Globe) and the 3Arena. The football clubs Hammarby and Djurgården are based at the 3Arena in Johanneshov, a stadium built in 2013.

Johanneshov's biggest and only mall is the Globen mall, near the spherical building. It provides a 1-story H&M store, the only fast fashion store in the district.

Almost all of Stockholm's existing supermarket chains exist in the district. That includes Hemköp, ICA, Coop, etc. Importantly, as Lidl (a non-Swedish supermarket chain) exists everywhere in the country, it unfortunately doesn't exist in the specific district.
